= United States results in men's freestyle wrestling =

Wrestlers from the United States have taken part in most of the major men's freestyle wrestling competitions over the years, in particular the Olympic Games and World Wrestling Championships. Men's freestyle wrestling competition at the Olympics was first held in 1904. FILA (now known as United World Wrestling) began holding World Championships in men's freestyle in 1951.

During Olympic years there is only six weight classes contested, with the World Championships featuring ten weight classes since 2018. The World Championships contest the six Olympic, along with four non-Olympic weight classes. The United States did not send wrestlers to the championships in 1951, 1957, 1959, 1980, and 2002. No official team standings are kept for the Olympics. Some team finishes are approximate.

== Olympics and World Championships (Note: No official team standings are kept for the Olympics. Some team finishes are approximate.) ==
=== 1904 ===
Year	Team Finish	47.6 kg	52.2 kg	56.7 kg	61.2 kg	65.8 kg	71.7 kg	71.7+ kg
1904	1st	Curry, Robert (1st)	Mehnert, George (1st)	Niflot, Isidor (1st)	Bradshaw, Benjamin (1st)	Roehm, Otto (1st)	Ericksen, Charles (1st)	Hansen, Bernhoff (1st)
		Hein, John (2nd)	Bauer, Gustave (2nd)	Wester, August (2nd)	McLear, Theodore (2nd)	Tesing, Rudolph (2nd)	Beckmann, William (2nd)	Kugler, Frank (2nd)
		Thiefenthaler, Gustav (3rd)	Nelson, William (3rd)	Strebler, Louis (3rd)	Clapper, Charles (3rd)	Zirkel, Albert (3rd)	Jerry Winholtz (3rd)	Warmbold, Fred (3rd)
		Holgate, Claude (4th)	N/A	Four Other Competitors	Six Other Competitors	Seven Other Competitors	Seven Other Competitors	Two Other Competitors

=== 1908 ===
Year	Team Finish	54 kg	60.3 kg	66.6 kg	73 kg	73+ kg
1908	2nd	Mehnert, George (1st)	Dole, George (1st)	Krug, John (5th)	Craige, John (DNP)	Talbott, Lee (DNP)
		N/A	N/A	N/A	Narganes, Fred (DNP)	N/A

=== 1920 ===
Year	Team Finish	60 kg	67.5 kg	75 kg	82.5 kg	82.5+ kg
1920	2nd	Ackerly, Charles (1st)	Metropoulos, George (DNP)	Johnson, Charley (3rd)	Maurer, Walter (3rd)	Pendleton, Nat (2nd)
		Gerson, Samuel (2nd)	Shimmon, Joseph (DNP)	Frantz, Angus (4th)	Redman, John (4th)	Meyer, Fred (3rd)

=== 1924–1936 ===
Year	Team Finish	56 kg	61 kg	66 kg	72 kg	79 kg	87 kg	87+ kg
1924	1st	Hines, Bryan (3rd)	Reed, Robin (1st)	Vis, Russell (1st)	Lookabaugh, Guy (4th)	Smith, Herschel (DNP)	Spellman, John (1st)	Steel, Harry (1st)
		MacWilliam, Milton (DNP)	Newton, Chester (2nd)	Martter, Perry (DNP)	Johnson, William (5th)	Wright, Walter (DNP)	Strack, Charles (DNP)	Flanders, Roger (DNP)
1928	4th	Hewitt, Robert (5th)	Morrison, Allie (1st)	Berryman, Clarence (6th)	Appleton, Lloyd (2nd)	Hammonds, Ralph (4th)	Edwards, Heywood (4th)	George, Ed (4th)
1932	1st	Pearce, Robert (1st)	Nemir, Edgar (2nd)	Clodfelter, Melvin (4th)	van Bebber, Jack (1st)	Hess, Robert (4th)	Mehringer, Peter (1st)	Riley, Jack (2nd)
1936	2nd	Flood, Ross (2nd)	Millard, Francis (2nd)	Strong, Harley (5th)	Lewis, Frank (1st)	Voliva, Richard (2nd)	Clemons, Ray (5th)	Dunn, Roy (DNP)

=== 1948–1968 ===
Year	Team Finish	52 kg	57 kg	62 kg (−1961), 63 kg (1962–1968)	67 kg (−1961), 70 kg (1962–1968)	73 kg (−1961), 78 kg (1962–1968)	79 kg (−1961), 87 kg (1962–1968)	87 kg (−1961), 97 kg (1962–1968)	87+ kg (−1961), 97+ kg (1962–1968)
1948	2nd	Jernigan, William (7th)	Leeman, Gerald (2nd)	Moore, Hal (6th)	Koll, Bill (5th)	Merrill, Leland (3rd)	Brand, Glen (1st)	Wittenberg, Henry (1st)	Hutton, Richard (7th)
1949	N/A	Event Not Held							
1950	N/A	Event Not Held							
1951	DNC	Team Did not compete							
1952	4th	Peery, Robert (7th)	Borders, Bill (DNP)	Henson, Josiah (3rd)	Evans, Jay (2nd)	Smith, William (1st)	Hodge, Dan (DNP)	Wittenberg, Henry (2nd)	Kerslake, William (5th)
1953	N/A	Event Not Held							
1954	8th	Delgado, Richard (5th)	Rose, James (5th)	Rice, Alan (5th)	No Recorded Competitor	Holt, Jay (6th)	Hubel, Wenzel (4th)	Thomas, Dale (6th)	No Recorded Competitor
1955	N/A	Event Not Held							
1956	6th	Delgado, Richard (5th)	Allen, Lee (DNP)	Roderick, Myron (4th)	Evans, Jay (5th)	Fischer, Ernest (8th)	Hodge, Dan (2nd)	Blair, Peter (3rd)	Kerslake, William (7th)
1957	DNC	Team Did not compete							
1958	N/A	Event Not Held							
1959	DNC	Team Did not compete							
1960	2nd	Simons, Gray (5th)	McCann, Terry (1st)	Giani, Louis (DNP)	Wilson, Shelby (1st)	Blubaugh, Douglas (1st)	DeWitt, Ed (4th)	Brand, Daniel (5th)	Kerslake, William (8th)
1961	6th	Wilson, Richard (5th)	Molino, Carmen (5th)	Allen, Lee (6th)	Rodriguez, Michael (5th)	Perillo, Earl (6th)	Camilleri, Russ (6th)	Brand, Daniel (4th)	Lewis, Dale (DNP)
1962	6th	Wilson, Richard (DNP)	Auble, Dave (4th)	Finley, Ron (4th)	Ruth, Gregory (5th)	Ferguson, James (3rd)	Farrell, Bill (DNP)	Brand, Daniel (3rd)	Solowin, Merrell (DNP)
1963	6th	Fitch, Andrew (6th)	Auble, Dave (DNP)	Finley, Ron (4th)	Ruth, Gregory (3rd)	Lahr, Dean (4th)	Camilleri, Russ (6th)	Winer, Russell (DNP)	Solowin, Merrell (DNP)
1964	8th	Simons, Gray (7th)	Auble, Dave (4th)	Douglas, Bobby (4th)	Ruth, Gregory (5th)	Tribble, Charles (DNP)	Brand, Daniel (3rd)	Conine, Gerald (6th)	Kristoff, Larry (7th)
1965	8th	Sanders, Rick (DNP)	No Recorded Competitor	Douglas, Bobby (DNP)	Burke, James (DNP)	Camilleri, Russ (DNP)	Baughman, Wayne (5th)	Conine, Gerald (DNP)	Kristoff, Larry (3rd)
1966	3rd	Sanders, Rick (3rd)	Powell, Fred (5th)	Douglas, Bobby (2nd)	Holzer, Werner (4th)	Kauffman, Len (4th)	Lahr, Dean (5th)	Lewis, Jess (5th)	Kristoff, Larry (2nd)
1967	4th	Sanders, Rick (2nd)	Sofman, Richard (DNP)	Young, Michael (3rd)	Holzer, Werner (DNP)	Kelly, Patrick (DNP)	Baughman, Wayne (6th)	Houska, Harry (4th)	Kristoff, Larry (3rd)
1968	6th	Sanders, Rick (2nd)	Behm, Don (2nd)	Douglas, Bobby (DNP)	Wells, Wayne (4th)	Combs, Steve (7th)	Peckham, Thomas (4th)	Lewis, Jess (6th)	Kristoff, Larry (5th)

=== 1969–1996 ===
Year	Team Finish	48 kg	52 kg	57 kg	62 kg	68 kg	74 kg	82 kg	90 kg	100 kg	100+ kg (−1984), 130 kg (1985–1996)
1969	2nd	Kestel, Dale (5th)	Sanders, Rick (1st)	Behm, Don (2nd)	Young, Michael (5th)	Douglas, Bobby (4th)	Wells, Wayne (2nd)	Fozzard, Fred (1st)	Schenk, Henk (3rd)	Kristoff, Larry (2nd)	Rasley, Rocky (5th)
1970	2nd	Orta, Joe (DNP)	Morley, John (5th)	Behm, Don (5th)	Young, Michael (3rd)	Douglas, Bobby (3rd)	Wells, Wayne (1st)	Fozzard, Fred (5th)	Harlow, Bill (2nd)	Kristoff, Larry (2nd)	Wojciechowski, Greg (4th)
1971	6th	Gonzales, Sergio (6th)	Carr, Jimmy (DNP)	Behm, Don (2nd)	Davis, Gene (4th)	Gable, Dan (1st)	Gallego, Mike (DNP)	Peterson, John (DNP)	Hellickson, Russ (3rd)	Kristoff, Larry (DNP)	Deadrich, Buck (DNP)
1972	2nd	Gonzales, Sergio (7th)	Carr, Jimmy (DNP)	Sanders, Rick (2nd)	Davis, Gene (DNP)	Gable, Dan (1st)	Wells, Wayne (1st)	Peterson, John (2nd)	Peterson, Ben (1st)	Schenk, Henk (DNP)	Taylor, Chris (3rd)
1973	5th	Range, David (DNP)	Geller, Henry (DNP)	Behm, Don (4th)	Morgan, Larry (4th)	Keaser, Lloyd (1st)	Dziedzic, Stan (DNP)	Peterson, John (DNP)	Peterson, Ben (3rd)	Duschen, James (DNP)	McCready, Mike (DNP)
1974	15th	Rosado, William (DNP)	Breece, Gary (DNP)	Gitcho, Jan (DNP)	Humphrey, Jim (DNP)	Davis, Gene (6th)	Dziedzic, Stan (5th)	Hicks, Greg (DNP)	Paolano, Vincent (DNP)	Bowlsby, John (DNP)	McCready, Mike (6th)
1975	5th	Baltezore, Larry (DNP)	Haines, Jim (DNP)	Massery, Mark (4th)	Humphrey, Jim (4th)	Keaser, Lloyd (DNP)	Adams, Carl (5th)	Hicks, Greg (5th)	Hellickson, Russ (4th)	Peterson, Ben (4th)	McCready, Mike (5th)
1976	3rd	Rosado, William (DNP)	Haines, Jim (DNP)	Corso, Joe (DNP)	Davis, Gene (3rd)	Keaser, Lloyd (2nd)	Dziedzic, Stan (3rd)	Peterson, John (1st)	Peterson, Ben (2nd)	Hellickson, Russ (2nd)	Jackson, Jimmy (DNP)
1977	4th	No Recorded Competitor	Miller, Randal (DNP)	Reinwand, Jack (3rd)	Humphrey, Jim (2nd)	Yagla, Chuck (DNP)	Dziedzic, Stan (1st)	Chris Campbell (5th)	Soucie, Laurent (DNP)	McCready, Mike (DNP)	Bowlsby, John (6th)
1978	5th	Rosado, William (DNP)	Haines, Jim (4th)	Lewis, Randy (DNP)	Cysewski, Tim (DNP)	Humphrey, Jim (DNP)	Kemp, Lee (1st)	Peterson, John (3rd)	Peterson, Ben (5th)	Bielenberg, Larry (6th)	Wojciechowski, Greg (5th)
1979	2nd	Weaver, Bobby (2nd)	Haines, Jim (2nd)	Corso, Joe (3rd)	Metzger, Andre (3rd)	Yagla, Chuck (DNP)	Kemp, Lee (1st)	Peterson, John (2nd)	Soucie, Laurent (6th)	Hellickson, Russ (2nd)	Klemm, David (DNP)
1980	DNC	Weaver, Bobby (DNC)	Mills, Gene (DNC)	Azevedo, John (DNC)	Lewis, Randy (DNC)	Yagla, Chuck (DNC)	Kemp, Lee (DNC)	Chris Campbell (DNC)	Peterson, Ben (DNC)	Hellickson, Russ (DNC)	Wojciechowski, Greg (DNC)
1981	3rd	Rosado, William (3rd)	Gonzales, Joe (5th)	Corso, Joe (DNP)	Land, Mike (5th)	Rein, Andy (4th)	Kemp, Lee (3rd)	Chris Campbell (1st)	Lewis, Dan (DNP)	Gibson, Greg (2nd)	Smith, Harold (5th)
1982	2nd	Vanni, Tim (6th)	Gonzales, Joe (3rd)	Azevedo, John (4th)	Lewis, Randy (4th)	Metzger, Andre (4th)	Kemp, Lee (1st)	Schultz, Dave (3rd)	Hull, Mitch (9th)	Gibson, Greg (3rd)	Baumgartner, Bruce (7th)
1983	3rd	Weaver, Bobby (5th)	Gonzales, Joe (9th)	Davis, Barry (12th)	Smith, Lee Roy (2nd)	Carr, Nate (8th)	Schultz, Dave (1st)	Schultz, Mark (7th)	Banach, Ed (7th)	Gibson, Greg (2nd)	Baumgartner, Bruce (3rd)
1984	1st	Weaver, Bobby (1st)	Gonzales, Joe (DNP)	Davis, Barry (2nd)	Lewis, Randy (1st)	Rein, Andy (2nd)	Schultz, Dave (1st)	Schultz, Mark (1st)	Banach, Ed (1st)	Banach, Lou (1st)	Baumgartner, Bruce (1st)
1985	2nd	Vanni, Tim (10th)	Gonzales, Joe (4th)	Darkus, Kevin (2nd)	Mills, Gene (DNP)	Metzger, Andre (DNP)	Schultz, Dave (2nd)	Schultz, Mark (1st)	Scherr, Bill (1st)	Severn, Dan (6th)	Baumgartner, Bruce (3rd)
1986	2nd	Vanni, Tim (6th)	Erb, Mike (9th)	Davis, Barry (2nd)	McFarland, Joe (2nd)	Metzger, Andre (2nd)	Schultz, Dave (3rd)	Schultz, Mark (7th)	Scherr, Jim (3rd)	Scherr, Bill (2nd)	Baumgartner, Bruce (1st)
1987	2nd	Vanni, Tim (5th)	Robbins, Greg (12th)	Davis, Barry (2nd)	Smith, John (1st)	Metzger, Andre (3rd)	Schultz, Dave (2nd)	Schultz, Mark (1st)	Scherr, Jim (2nd)	Scherr, Bill (3rd)	Baumgartner, Bruce (3rd)
1988	2nd	Vanni, Tim (4th)	Chertow, Ken (DNP)	Davis, Barry (DNP)	Smith, John (1st)	Carr, Nate (3rd)	Monday, Kenny (1st)	Schultz, Mark (6th)	Scherr, Jim (5th)	Scherr, Bill (3rd)	Baumgartner, Bruce (2nd)
1989	2nd	Vanni, Tim (5th)	Jones, Zeke (7th)	Penrith, Brad (DNP)	Smith, John (1st)	Giura, John (7th)	Monday, Kenny (1st)	Douglas, Melvin (2nd)	Scherr, Jim (2nd)	Scherr, Bill (2nd)	Baumgartner, Bruce (2nd)
1990	2nd	Baze, Cory (6th)	Jones, Zeke (4th)	Melchiore, Joe (7th)	Smith, John (1st)	Carr, Nate (5th)	Koll, Rob (5th)	Alger, Royce (2nd)	Chris Campbell (2nd)	Trost, Kirk (3rd)	Baumgartner, Bruce (2nd)
1991	2nd	Vanni, Tim (11th)	Jones, Zeke (1st)	Penrith, Brad (2nd)	Smith, John (1st)	Saunders, Townsend (15th)	Monday, Kenny (2nd)	Jackson, Kevin (1st)	Chris Campbell (5th)	Coleman, Mark (2nd)	Baumgartner, Bruce (7th)
1992	2nd	Vanni, Tim (5th)	Jones, Zeke (2nd)	Cross, Kendall (6th)	Smith, John (1st)	Saunders, Townsend (7th)	Monday, Kenny (2nd)	Jackson, Kevin (1st)	Chris Campbell (3rd)	Coleman, Mark (7th)	Baumgartner, Bruce (1st)
1993	1st	Eiter, Rob (9th)	Jones, Zeke (4th)	Brands, Terry (1st)	Brands, Tom (1st)	Saunders, Townsend (4th)	Schultz, Dave (2nd)	Jackson, Kevin (4th)	Douglas, Melvin (1st)	Kerr, Mark (7th)	Baumgartner, Bruce (1st)
1994	10th	Vanni, Tim (9th)	Jones, Zeke (11th)	Brands, Terry (11th)	Brands, Tom (11th)	Saunders, Townsend (11th)	Schultz, Dave (7th)	Jackson, Kevin (11th)	Douglas, Melvin (3rd)	Kerr, Mark (11th)	Baumgartner, Bruce (2nd)
1995	1st	Eiter, Rob (7th)	Jones, Zeke (3rd)	Brands, Terry (1st)	Brands, Tom (9th)	Saunders, Townsend (8th)	Schultz, Dave (5th)	Jackson, Kevin (1st)	Douglas, Melvin (3rd)	Angle, Kurt (1st)	Baumgartner, Bruce (1st)
1996	1st	Eiter, Rob (8th)	Rosselli, Lou (11th)	Cross, Kendall (1st)	Brands, Tom (1st)	Saunders, Townsend (2nd)	Monday, Kenny (6th)	Gutches, Les (7th)	Douglas, Melvin (7th)	Angle, Kurt (1st)	Baumgartner, Bruce (3rd)

=== 1997–2001 ===
Year	Team Finish	54 kg	58 kg	63 kg	69 kg	76 kg	85 kg	97 kg	130 kg
1997	6th	Jones, Zeke (11th)	Purler, Tony (10th)	Kolat, Cary (2nd)	McIlravy, Lincoln (12th)	St. John, Dan (16th)	Gutches, Les (1st)	Douglas, Melvin (9th)	Erikson, Tom (4th)
1998	3rd	Henson, Sammie (1st)	Purler, Tony (11th)	Kolat, Cary (3rd)	McIlravy, Lincoln (3rd)	Marianetti, Steve (11th)	Gutches, Les (7th)	Douglas, Melvin (5th)	McCoy, Kerry (4th)
1999	2nd	Akin, Eric (16th)	Guerrero, Eric (7th)	Kolat, Cary (4th)	McIlravy, Lincoln (2nd)	Williams, Joe (4th)	Gutches, Les (3rd)	Black, Dominic (17th)	Neal, Stephen (1st)
2000	2nd	Henson, Sammie (2nd)	Brands, Terry (3rd)	Kolat, Cary (9th)	McIlravy, Lincoln (3rd)	Slay, Brandon (1st)	Burton, Charles (5th)	Douglas, Melvin (18th)	McCoy, Kerry (5th)
2001	5th	Abas, Stephen (16th)	Guerrero, Eric (13th)	Zadick, Bill (7th)	Bono, Chris (13th)	Williams, Joe (3rd)	Eggum, Brandon (2nd)	Black, Dominic (13th)	McCoy, Kerry (4th)

=== 2002–2013 ===
Year	Team Finish	55 kg	60 kg	66 kg	74 kg	84 kg	96 kg	120 kg
2002	DNC	Abas, Stephen (DNC)	Guerrero, Eric (DNC)	Bono, Chris (DNC)	Williams, Joe (DNC)	Sanderson, Cael (DNC)	Hartung, Tim (DNC)	McCoy, Kerry (DNC)
2003	2nd	Abas, Stephen (5th)	Guerrero, Eric (10th)	Kelly, Jamill (28th)	Williams, Joe (13th)	Sanderson, Cael (2nd)	Cormier, Daniel (5th)	McCoy, Kerry (2nd)
2004	2nd	Abas, Stephen (2nd)	Guerrero, Eric (16th)	Kelly, Jamill (2nd)	Williams, Joe (5th)	Sanderson, Cael (1st)	Cormier, Daniel (4th)	McCoy, Kerry (7th)
2005	8th	Henson, Sammie (14th)	Lightner, Michael (22nd)	Bono, Chris (22nd)	Williams, Joe (3rd)	Lawal, Mo (7th)	Cormier, Daniel (11th)	Thompson, Tolly (3rd)
2006	3rd	Henson, Sammie (3rd)	Zadick, Mike (2nd)	Zadick, Bill (1st)	Pritzlaff, Donny (3rd)	Hrovat, Andy (18th)	Cormier, Daniel (21st)	Thompson, Tolly (14th)
2007	4th	Cejudo, Henry (31st)	Zadick, Mike (27th)	Schwab, Doug (5th)	Heskett, Joe (5th)	Williams, Joe (5th)	Cormier, Daniel (3rd)	Rowlands, Tommy (5th)
2008	9th	Cejudo, Henry (1st)	Zadick, Mike (19th)	Schwab, Doug (14th)	Askren, Ben (7th)	Hrovat, Andy (12th)	Cormier, Daniel (19th)	Mocco, Steve (7th)
2009	7th	Felix, Danny (24th)	Bunch, Shawn (28th)	Paulson, Trent (24th)	Schlatter, Dustin (23rd)	Herbert, Jake (2nd)	Varner, Jake (9th)	Dlagnev, Tervel (3rd)
2010	22nd	Blanc, Obe (9th)	Zadick, Mike (25th)	Metcalf, Brent (20th)	Paulson, Travis (29th)	Herbert, Jake (25th)	Bergman, J.D. (10th)	Sigman, Les (9th)
2011	3rd	Simmons, Nick (5th)	Humphrey, Reece (9th)	Ware, Teyon (30th)	Burroughs, Jordan (1st)	Sanderson, Cael (5th)	Varner, Jake (3rd)	Dlagnev, Tervel (5th)
2012	2nd	Hazewinkel, Sam (17th)	Scott, Coleman (3rd)	Frayer, Jared (17th)	Burroughs, Jordan (1st)	Herbert, Jake (7th)	Varner, Jake (1st)	Dlagnev, Tervel (3rd)
2013	5th	Escobedo, Angel (5th)	Humphrey, Reece (8th)	Metcalf, Brent (27th)	Burroughs, Jordan (1st)	Gavin, Keith (14th)	Bergman, J.D. (25th)	Dlagnev, Tervel (5th)

=== 2014–2017 ===
Year	Team Finish	57 kg	61 kg	65 kg	70 kg	74 kg	86 kg	97 kg	125 kg
2014	9th	Ramos, Tony (16th)	Kennedy, Jimmy (10th)	Metcalf, Brent (12th)	Marable, Nick (8th)	Burroughs, Jordan (3rd)	Ruth, Edward (15th)	Varner, Jake (13th)	Dlagnev, Tervel (3rd)
2015	7th	Ramos, Tony (11th)	Humphrey, Reece (12th)	Metcalf, Brent (10th)	Green, James (3rd)	Burroughs, Jordan (1st)	Herbert, Jake (33rd)	Snyder, Kyle (1st)	Rey, Zach (23rd)
2016	3rd	Dennis, Daniel (19th)	Stieber, Logan^ (1st)	Molinaro, Frank (5th)	Green, James^ (7th)	Burroughs, Jordan (9th)	Cox, J'Den (3rd)	Snyder, Kyle (1st)	Dlagnev, Tervel (5th)
2017	1st	Gilman, Thomas (2nd)	Stieber, Logan (12th)	Retherford, Zain (11th)	Green, James (2nd)	Burroughs, Jordan (1st)	Cox, J'Den (3rd)	Snyder, Kyle (1st)	Gwiazdowski, Nick (3rd)

^: 61 kg and 70 kg were non-Olympic weights and were therefore wrestled at the 2016 World Wrestling Championships.

=== 2018–present ===
Year	Team Finish	57 kg	61 kg	65 kg	70 kg	74 kg	79 kg	86 kg	92 kg	97 kg	125 kg
2018	2nd	Gilman, Thomas (5th)	Colon, Joe (3rd)	Stieber, Logan (19th)	Green, James (13th)	Burroughs, Jordan (3rd)	Dake, Kyle (1st)	Taylor, David (1st)	Cox, J'Den (1st)	Snyder, Kyle (2nd)	Gwiazdowski, Nick (3rd)
2019	4th	Fix, Daton (12th)	Graff, Tyler (5th)	Retherford, Zain (26th)	Green, James (13th)	Burroughs, Jordan (3rd)	Dake, Kyle (1st)	Downey, Pat (9th)	Cox, J'Den (1st)	Snyder, Kyle (3rc)	Gwiazdowski, Nick (17th)
2020	2nd	Gilman, Thomas (3rd)	Non-Olympic Weight	Oliver, Jordan (DNQ)	Non-Olympic Weight	Dake, Kyle (3rd)	Non-Olympic Weight	Taylor, David (1st)	Non-Olympic Weight	Snyder, Kyle (2nd)	Steveson, Gable (1st)
2021	2nd	Gilman, Thomas (1st)	Fix, Daton (2nd)	Diakomihalis, Yianni (26th)	Green, James (13th)	Dake, Kyle (1st)	Burroughs, Jordan (1st)	Taylor, David (2nd)	Cox, J'Den (3rd)	Snyder, Kyle (2nd)	Gwiazdowski, Nick (5th)
2022	1st	Gilman, Thomas (2nd)	Gross, Seth (5th)	Diakomihalis, Yianni (2nd)	Retherford, Zain (2nd)	Dake, Kyle (1st)	Burroughs, Jordan (1st)	Taylor, David (1st)	Cox, J'Den (2nd)	Snyder, Kyle (1st)	Zillmer, Hayden (7th)
2023	1st	Richards, Zane (20th)	Arujau, Vito (1st)	Lee, Nick (7th)	Retherford, Zain (1st)	Dake, Kyle (2nd)	Marsteller, Chance (14th)	Taylor, David (1st)	Valencia, Zahid (3rd)	Snyder, Kyle (3rd)	Parris, Mason (3rd)
2024	3rd	Lee, Spencer (2nd)	Arujau, Vito^ (3rd)	Retherford, Zain (13th)	Green, James^ (11th)	Dake, Kyle (3rd)	Burroughs, Jordan^ (9th)	Brooks, Aaron (3rd)	Taylor, David^ (3rd)	Snyder, Kyle (5th)	Parris, Mason (10th)
2025	2nd	Lee, Spencer (20th)	Forrest, Jax (5th)	Woods, Real (3rd)	Duke, PJ (11th)	David Carr (5th)	Haines, Levi (2nd)	Valencia, Zahid (1st)	Trent Hidlay (1st)	Snyder, Kyle (1st)	Hendrickson, Wyatt (17th)
2026	1st	Lee, Spencer (1st)	Blaze, Marcus (3rd)	Bassett, Bo (1st)	Retherford, Zain (3rd)	Green, James (9th)	Haines, Levi (1st)	Dake, Kyle (1st)	Trent Hidlay (2nd)	Snyder, Kyle (1st)	Hendrickson, Wyatt (3rd)

^: 61 kg, 70 kg, 79 kg and 92 kg were non-Olympic weights and were therefore wrestled at the 2024 World Wrestling Championships.

== Team Titles and Results ==
The tables shows the team results and titles for World Championships, World Cups, and Olympic Games.

Event	Champion	Runner-up	Third	Top-5 Apps	Top-10 Apps
World Championships	6	15	6	36	47
Olympic Games	5	12	3	22	26
World Cups	15	14	8	-	-

== Multiple-time gold medalists ==
The table below shows American male wrestlers who have won at least two gold medals at the World Championships or Olympic Games in freestyle wrestling. Boldface denotes active wrestlers.

Rank	Wrestler	Weights	From	To	Gold	Silver	Bronze	Total
1	Jordan Burroughs	74 kg / 79 kg	2011	2022	7	-	3	10
2	**Kyle Snyder**	97 kg	2015	2026	6	3	2	11
2	John Smith	62 kg	1987	1992	6	-	-	6
4	Bruce Baumgartner	130 kg	1983	1996	5	4	4	13
4	**Kyle Dake**	74 kg / 79 kg	2018	2026	5	1	2	8
6	David Taylor	86 kg	2018	2023	4	1	-	5
7	Leroy Kemp	74 kg	1978	1982	3	-	1	4
7	Kevin Jackson	82 kg	1992	1995	3	-	-	3
7	Mark Schultz	82 kg	1984	1987	3	-	-	3
10	Dave Schultz	74 kg / 82 kg	1982	1993	2	3	2	7
10	J'den Cox	86 kg / 92 kg	2016	2022	2	1	3	6
10	Kenny Monday	74 kg	1988	1992	2	2	-	4
10	Wayne Wells	74 kg	1969	1972	2	1	-	3
10	Terry Brands	57 kg / 58 kg	1993	2000	2	-	1	3
10	Kurt Angle	100 kg	1995	1996	2	-	-	2
10	Tom Brands	62 kg	1993	1996	2	-	-	2
10	Dan Gable	68 kg	1971	1972	2	-	-	2
10	George Mehnert	52 kg / 54 kg	1904	1908	2	-	-	2

== See also ==
- USA Wrestling
- Wrestling in the United States
- United States results in Greco-Roman wrestling
- United States results in women's freestyle wrestling
- Soviet and Russian results in men's freestyle wrestling
- List of World and Olympic Champions in men's freestyle wrestling
- List of Cadet, Junior, and Espoir World Champions in men's freestyle wrestling
- Iranian results in men's freestyle wrestling
