= Bill Scherr =

American wrestler (born 1961)

Personal information
- Full name: William Harold Scherr
- Born: July 27, 1961 (age 65) Eureka, South Dakota, U.S.
- Height: 6 ft 0 in (183 cm)
- Weight: 220 lb (100 kg)

Sport
- Country: United States
- Sport: Wrestling
- Events: Freestyle and Folkstyle
- College team: Nebraska
- Club: Sunkist Kids Wrestling Club
- Team: USA
Medal record
Men's freestyle wrestling
Representing the United States
Olympic Games
Bronze medal – third place	1988 Seoul	100 kg
World Championships
Gold medal – first place	1985 Budapest	90 kg
Silver medal – second place	1986 Budapest	100 kg
Silver medal – second place	1989 Martigny	100 kg
Bronze medal – third place	1987 Clermont-Ferrand	100 kg
Pan American Games
Gold medal – first place	1987 Indianapolis	100 kg
Pan American Championships
Gold medal – first place	1987 Indianapolis	100 kg
Gold medal – first place	1989 Colorado Springs	100 kg
Collegiate Wrestling
Representing the Nebraska Cornhuskers
NCAA Division I Championships
Gold medal – first place	1984 East Rutherford	190 lb
Bronze medal – third place	1983 Oklahoma City	190 lb

William Harold Scherr (born July 27, 1961) is an American former wrestler who competed in the 1988 Summer Olympics, for the United States.

Born in Eureka, South Dakota, Scherr also competed in the World Championships as a freestyle wrestler (85', 86, 87', and 89'), earning a gold medal in 1985 at the FILA Wrestling World Championships in Budapest. In college, Scherr wrestled at the University of Nebraska–Lincoln and won the 190 pound NCAA championship in 1984. His twin brother Jim Scherr was also an Olympian.

In 1998, Scherr was inducted into the National Wrestling Hall of Fame as a Distinguished Member.

== Accomplishments ==
- Gold Medal – 1985 FILA World Championship 90 kg
- Silver Medal – 1986 FILA World Championship 100 kg
- Bronze Medal – 1987 FILA World Championship 100 kg
- Bronze Medal – 1988 Olympics Freestyle Wrestling 100 kg
- Silver Medal – 1989 FILA World Championship 100 kg
- 1998 – National Wrestling Hall of Fame Distinguished Member
