= Foxcatcher =

2014 film by Bennett Miller

- Theatrical release poster
- Directed by: Bennett Miller
- Written by: E. Max Frye; Dan Futterman
- Produced by: Anthony Bregman; Megan Ellison; Jon Kilik; Bennett Miller
- Starring: Steve Carell; Channing Tatum; Mark Ruffalo; Vanessa Redgrave
- Cinematography: Greig Fraser
- Edited by: Stuart Levy; Conor O'Neill; Jay Cassidy
- Music by: Rob Simonsen
- Production companies: Annapurna Pictures; Likely Story
- Distributed by: Sony Pictures Classics (North and Latin America, Eastern Europe, Scandinavia and South Africa); Annapurna International (International)
- Release dates: May 19, 2014 (Cannes Film Festival); November 14, 2014 (United States)
- Running time: 134 minutes
- Country: United States
- Language: English
- Budget: $24 million (Note: Foxcatcher filed for a $6.07 million tax credit with Pennsylvania, and Pennsylvania's film production incentive program awards a 25% tax credit. ($6.07 x 4 = 24.28))
- Box office: $19.2 million

Foxcatcher is a 2014 American biographical sports thriller film, produced and directed by Bennett Miller. Written by E. Max Frye and Dan Futterman, the film stars Steve Carell, Channing Tatum, and Mark Ruffalo. Its plot is loosely based on multimillionaire Du Pont family heir and wrestling enthusiast John du Pont's 1986 recruitment of Olympic gold medalist brothers Mark and Dave Schultz, to help coach American wrestlers, and du Pont's murder of Dave in 1996.

Foxcatcher premiered on May 19, 2014 at the Cannes Film Festival, where Miller won Best Director. Upon its theatrical release on November 14, 2014, it received critical acclaim for the three lead actors' performances, Miller's direction, and the visual style and tone. Foxcatcher was nominated for five awards at the 87th Academy Awards, including Best Actor for Carell, Best Supporting Actor for Ruffalo and Best Director for Miller. The film also received three Golden Globe nominations, including Best Motion Picture – Drama.

== Plot ==
In 1987 Olympic wrestling champion Mark Schultz speaks at an elementary school in place of his older brother Dave. Both won gold medals at the 1984 Summer Olympics, but Mark feels overshadowed by Dave. Mark is contacted by philanthropist and wrestling enthusiast John E. du Pont, an heir to the du Pont family fortune, who arranges to fly Mark to his estate in Pennsylvania where John has built a private wrestling training facility. John invites Mark to join his wrestling team, Foxcatcher, to be paid to train for the World Championship. Mark accepts the offer, with John urging him to enlist Dave as well. Dave declines, to avoid uprooting his wife and two children, so Mark moves to Pennsylvania alone.

Mark stays in a homey guest house and is greeted there by John. Through training with his new teammates and John's financial support, Mark excels with Foxcatcher, winning gold at the 1987 World Wrestling Championships. John praises him, and they develop a friendship. John introduces Mark to cocaine, which he starts to use regularly. He confides in Mark, whom he now calls a true friend, telling him how his mother Jean du Pont paid a boy to act as his friend. John organizes an over-50 masters wrestling tournament, which he wins after his opponent is paid to lose the final. Jean tells her son that wrestling is a "low sport" and that she does not like seeing him "being low". One day Mark and his teammates take the morning off from training to watch mixed martial arts on television. Angered by this (as well as Mark's bitter refusal to be in his brother's presence in Foxcatcher), John slaps Mark and berates him, saying that he will enlist Dave by any means necessary while also demanding that Mark work out his differences with his brother as soon as possible.

Dave decides to move with his family to Pennsylvania so he can join Foxcatcher. His self-esteem damaged by John, Mark decides to work and train alone, pushing away both John and Dave. As Foxcatcher prepares to enter the preliminaries for the 1988 Summer Olympics in Seoul, John's mother is escorted into his gym to watch him coach his team. He awkwardly demonstrates basic maneuvers for her and the other wrestlers. Jean leaves in disgust after seeing him give his back to his student.

At the 1988 Olympic Trials in Pensacola, Florida, Mark performs poorly, losing his first match against Rico Chiapparelli. Enraged, Mark destroys his room and goes on an eating binge, before Dave manages to break into his room, shocked to discover Mark's condition. They work feverishly so Mark can make his weight class. As Mark trains, John arrives and attempts to speak with him, but Dave turns him away. Mark competes well enough to win his match and make the Olympic team. Dave notices that John is absent, who left for Pennsylvania as his mother died.

After returning to the estate, Mark tells Dave that he needs to leave Foxcatcher to get away from John, having accepted a coaching role at Brigham Young University, and unsuccessfully asks Dave to leave with him. For a documentary funded by John about his exploits with Foxcatcher, Dave reluctantly praises him as coach and mentor. Mark loses his matches in Seoul on purpose, after which he leaves Foxcatcher. While Dave continues to live on John's estate and train with Foxcatcher, as a condition for his remaining, he gets John to continue to support Mark financially.

Later, John is sitting alone in his mansion's trophy room watching the documentary about Foxcatcher, which ends with Mark complimenting him at a ceremony depicted earlier. John calls his bodyguard and drives to Dave's home, where he finds him in the driveway working on his car radio. As Dave approaches John's car to greet him, John threatens him at gunpoint before shooting him three times and driving away. Dave's wife Nancy rushes out to him, and he dies in her arms. Setting a trap for John at his home, the police ambush and arrest him. The film ends with Mark competing in a cage fighting match with the crowd's cheers ringing in his head.

== Cast ==
- Steve Carell as John Eleuthère du Pont, American multimillionaire, philanthropist, and wrestling enthusiast
- Channing Tatum as Mark Schultz, an Olympic gold medal-winning wrestler
- Mark Ruffalo as Dave Schultz, an Olympic gold medal-winning wrestler, Mark's older brother
- Sienna Miller as Nancy Schultz, Dave's wife
- Vanessa Redgrave as Jean du Pont, John's mother
- Anthony Michael Hall as Jack
- David Zabriskie as Dan Bane
- Guy Boyd as Henry Beck
- Brett Rice as Fred Cole
- Bruce Baumgartner as USA wrestling rep #3
- Samara Lee as Danielle Schultz
- Jackson Frazer as Alexander Schultz
- Jane Mowder as Rosie
- Daniel Hilt as Robert Garcia
- Lee Perkins as Corporal Daly
- David "Doc" Bennett as Documentary Director
- Jazz Securo as MMA Announcer
- Brock Lesnar as Wrestler

== Production ==
=== Development ===
Bennett Miller began developing the project in 2010 after acquiring the rights to the story from Michael Coleman and Tom Heller. Megan Ellison financed the film through her Annapurna Pictures, also producing alongside Miller, Jon Kilik, and Anthony Bregman. Sony Pictures Classics became the distributor, taking over from Sony's Columbia Pictures, which had co-financed the film. Miller said "it's always been my hope and expectation that they (SPC) would distribute the film."

=== Filming ===
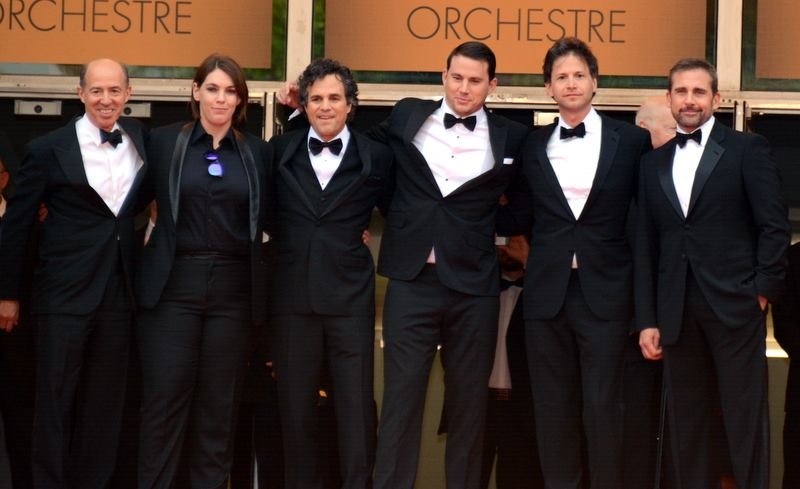
From left: Producers Jon Kilik and Megan Ellison, Mark Ruffalo, Channing Tatum, director Bennett Miller, and Steve Carell at the 2014 Cannes Film Festival

Shooting began in the Pittsburgh metropolitan area on October 15, 2012, in and near the suburbs of Sewickley, Pennsylvania, Sewickley Heights, and Edgeworth. With du Pont's mansion, Liseter Hall, having been demolished in January 2013, the filmmakers used Morven Park, a historic estate in Leesburg, Virginia, with a similar facade, for exterior filming. An 1899 mansion, Wilpen Hall, in the wealthy Pittsburgh suburb of Sewickley Heights, Pennsylvania, served as Foxcatcher's stand-in for the interior filming location for du Pont's Philadelphia-area estate.

Filming also took place in the Pittsburgh area communities of Rector (Ligonier Township), McKeesport, White Oak, Connoquenessing, and Wilkins The production sought permission to film in West Mifflin Middle School in West Mifflin, Pennsylvania. In December 2012, filming took place in Washington High School, Trinity High School, the Petersen Events Center in the Pittsburgh neighborhood of Oakland, and the California University of Pennsylvania Convocation Center. Filming was scheduled to last through January 2013.

The scene where the Foxcatcher team watches mixed martial arts on television in 1988 uses footage from Gary Goodridge's win over Paul Herrera at UFC 8, from February 1996. At UFC 9 that March, Mark Schultz made his MMA debut, defeating Goodridge. In the film, he is depicted facing a fictional opponent. Channing Tatum stated that the role was "the hardest acting challenge I've had to date."

=== Music ===
Foxcatcher features a musical score composed by Rob Simonsen, who recorded most of the music at AIR Studios in London. He said the film has a sensibility of sparseness as "the notes or colors that do show up have a greater impact". After he listened to Jacob Cohen's cello performance at a subway stop platform, Simonsen eventually brought him to record the cello solos.

Music supervisor Susan Jacobs selected samples from various composers to be used as placeholders for the temp music. Among these were recordings by film composer West Dylan Thordson, which Miller liked. After Thordson met Miller in New York City the following year, Thordson decided to move to New York to compose the test score. Eventually, however, he became involved as a co-composers. Mychael Danna, whom Miller had worked with in Capote (2005) and Moneyball (2011), was assigned to complete the finished score. However, Simonsen would receive the credit for the principal composer.

According to Thordson, there was a "similar intimacy to the melodic voices all three of us [composers] gravitate towards". While Danna and Simonsen evoked a sophisticated quality, Thordson incorporated a rough and handmade sound, reminiscent of "the world of a slightly out-of-tune farmhouse piano".

== Release ==
A release date for Foxcatcher was originally set for December 20, 2013. The date was postponed to allow for more time to complete the film, according to Sony Pictures Classics. The film debuted at the 2014 Cannes Film Festival in May 2014, in competition for the Palme d'Or, the festival's highest prize, where director Bennett Miller won the Award for Best Director.

The film made its way through the late-2014 festival circuit, appearing at the Telluride, Toronto, New York, Vancouver and London film festivals. Foxcatcher received a limited release on November 14, 2014.

The film opened across U.S. theaters through December 2014 and January 2015. The film was released on Blu-ray and DVD March 3, 2015.

== Reception ==
=== Box office ===
Foxcatcher was given a limited release in North America on November 14, 2014, grossing $270,877 from 6 theaters, an average of $45,146 per theater. The film had its wide release on January 16, 2015, opening in 759 theaters and grossing $980,000 finishing 20th at the box office. Overall, Foxcatcher grossed $12.1 million in North America and $7.1 million in other territories for a total gross of $19.2 million, against its $24 million budget.

=== Critical response ===
Foxcatcher received critical acclaim, with many praising the performances of Carell, Tatum, and Ruffalo. On Rotten Tomatoes, the film holds an approval rating of 88% based on 251 reviews, with an average rating of 7.9/10. The site's critical consensus states, "A chilling true crime drama, Foxcatcher offers Steve Carell, Mark Ruffalo and Channing Tatum a chance to shine—and all three rise to the challenge." On Metacritic, the film has a score of 81 out of 100, based on 49 critics, indicating "universal acclaim".

Justin Chang of Variety praised the film, writing: "Steve Carell, Mark Ruffalo and Channing Tatum give superb performances in Bennett Miller's powerfully disturbing true-crime saga." Eric Kohn of Indiewire also reacted positively, with most of his praise going towards Carell's and Tatum's performances.

Donald Clarke of The Irish Times praised Miller's direction, saying that "he [Miller] hits his stride with a stunning portrayal of psychopathy and moral decadence in the unlikely environment of Olympic wrestling." Todd McCarthy of The Hollywood Reporter praised Carell's performance, calling it "career changing."

Budd Wilkins of Slant Magazine, however, gave the film a negative review, writing that it "offers us next to nothing of utility or complexity about du Pont's pathology."

=== Reaction from Mark Schultz ===
Mark Schultz's reaction to the movie has been varied due to the intensely personal subject matter. He supported the film in general throughout its creation and served as a consultant. At one point he became angry and criticized Bennett Miller after critics pointed out "homosexual undertones" in the portrayal of the relationship between himself and du Pont. Schultz then demanded Miller address the issue "or I will." Schultz said that "Foxcatcher's scenes are mostly straight out of my book (except a few). But the relationships and personalities are complete fiction." Several weeks after these statements, Schultz recanted criticisms of the movie, saying "Foxcatcher is a miracle. I'm sorry I said I hated it. I love it," and apologized to Miller.

=== Top ten lists ===
Foxcatcher appeared on many critics' top ten lists of the best films of 2014.

- 1st – Peter Rainer, The Christian Science Monitor
- 1st – Katey Rich, The Village Voice
- 2nd – Owen Gleiberman, BBC
- 2nd – Stephen Holden, The New York Times
- 2nd – Kristopher Tapley, HitFix
- 2nd – Steve Persall, Tampa Bay Times
- 3rd – Liam Lacey, The Globe and Mail
- 3rd – Barbara Vancheri, Pittsburgh Post-Gazette
- 3rd – Peter Travers, Rolling Stone
- 4th – Jessica Kiang, Indiewire
- 4th – Mara Reinstein, Us Weekly
- 5th – Justin Chang and Scott Foundas, Variety
- 5th – Ann Hornaday, The Washington Post
- 5th – Betsy Sharkey, Los Angeles Times (tied with Whiplash)
- 6th – Todd McCarthy, The Hollywood Reporter
- 7th – Clayton Davis, Awards Circuit
- 8th – Richard Roeper, Chicago Sun-Times
- 8th – David Ansen, The Village Voice
- 9th – Rex Reed, The New York Observer
- 9th – Jocelyn Noveck, Associated Press
- Top 10 (unranked) – Steven Rea, Philadelphia Inquirer
- Top 10 (unranked) – Marshall Fine, Hollywood and Fine
- Top 10 (unranked) – Joe Morgenstern, The Wall Street Journal
- Best of 2014 (unranked) – Kenneth Turan, Los Angeles Times

=== Accolades ===
Ceremony	Award	Recipients	Result	Ref(s)
87th Academy Awards
87th Academy Awards	Best Director	Bennett Miller	Nominated	
87th Academy Awards	Best Actor	Steve Carell	Nominated	
87th Academy Awards	Best Supporting Actor	Mark Ruffalo	Nominated	
87th Academy Awards	Best Original Screenplay	E. Max Frye and Dan Futterman	Nominated	
87th Academy Awards	Best Makeup and Hairstyling	Bill Corso and Dennis Liddiard	Nominated	
4th AACTA International Awards	Best Actor	Steve Carell	Nominated	
4th AACTA International Awards	Best Supporting Actor	Mark Ruffalo	Nominated	
2014 Art Directors Guild Awards	Excellence in Production Design for a Contemporary Film	Jess Gonchor	Nominated	
2014 Cannes Film Festival	Palme d'Or	Bennett Miller	Nominated	
2014 Cannes Film Festival	Best Director	Bennett Miller	Won	
68th British Academy Film Awards	Best Actor in a Supporting Role	Mark Ruffalo	Nominated	
68th British Academy Film Awards	Best Actor in a Supporting Role	Steve Carell	Nominated	
Casting Society of America	Big Budget Drama	Jeanne McCarthy, Rori Bergman, Donna M. Belajac	Nominated	
Central Ohio Film Critics Association	Best Supporting Actor	Mark Ruffalo	Runner-Up	
Central Ohio Film Critics Association	Best Ensemble	Steve Carell, Mark Ruffalo, Channing Tatum, Vanessa Redgrave, Sienna Miller	Runner-Up	
International Cinephile Society Awards	Best Actor	Channing Tatum	Won	
18th Hollywood Film Awards	Hollywood Ensemble Award	Steve Carell, Mark Ruffalo, Channing Tatum, Vanessa Redgrave, Sienna Miller	Won	
24th Gotham Independent Film Awards	Gotham Jury Award	Steve Carell, Mark Ruffalo, Channing Tatum, Vanessa Redgrave, Sienna Miller	Won	
30th Independent Spirit Awards	Special Distinction Award	Bennett Miller, Anthony Bregman, Megan Ellison, Jon Kilik, E. Max Frye, Dan Futterman, Steve Carell, Mark Ruffalo, Channing Tatum	Won	
Make-Up Artists and Hair Stylists Guild Awards	Best Special Make-Up Effects in Feature Length Motion Picture	Bill Corso and Dennis Liddiard	Nominated	
MTV Movie Awards	Best Male Performance	Channing Tatum	Nominated	
MTV Movie Awards	Best Shirtless Performance	Channing Tatum	Nominated	
MTV Movie Awards	Best On-Screen Transformation	Steve Carell	Nominated	
Producers Guild of America Awards	Best Theatrical Motion Picture	Megan Ellison, Jon Kilik, Bennett Miller	Nominated	
San Francisco Film Critics Circle Award	Best Supporting Actor	Mark Ruffalo	Nominated	
San Diego Film Critics Society Award	Best Supporting Actor	Mark Ruffalo	Won	
30th Santa Barbara International Film Festival	Outstanding Performance of the Year Award	Steve Carell	Won	
19th Satellite Awards	Best Actor – Motion Picture	Steve Carell	Nominated	
19th Satellite Awards	Best Supporting Actor – Motion Picture	Mark Ruffalo	Nominated	
21st Screen Actors Guild Awards	Outstanding Performance by a Male Actor in a Leading Role	Steve Carell	Nominated	
21st Screen Actors Guild Awards	Outstanding Performance by a Male Actor in a Supporting Role	Mark Ruffalo	Nominated	
72nd Golden Globe Awards	Best Motion Picture – Drama		Nominated	
72nd Golden Globe Awards	Best Actor in a Motion Picture – Drama	Steve Carell	Nominated	
72nd Golden Globe Awards	Best Supporting Actor – Motion Picture	Mark Ruffalo	Nominated	
Writers Guild of America Awards	Best Original Screenplay	E. Max Frye and Dan Futterman	Nominated	
Awards Circuit Community Awards	Best Motion Picture		Nominated	
Awards Circuit Community Awards	Best Actor in a Supporting Role	Steve Carell	Nominated	
Awards Circuit Community Awards	Best Actor in a Supporting Role	Mark Ruffalo	Nominated	
Awards Circuit Community Awards	Best Makeup and Hairstyling	Bill Torso and Dennis Liddiard	Runner-Up	
