= Mark Schultz (wrestler) =

American wrestler (born 1960)

Personal information
- Full name: Mark Philip Schultz
- Born: October 26, 1960 (age 66) Palo Alto, California, U.S.
- Height: 5 ft 10 in (178 cm)
- Weight: 82 kg (181 lb)

Sport
- Country: United States
- Sport: Wrestling
- Events: Freestyle and Folkstyle
- College team: Oklahoma Sooners; UCLA Bruins
- Club: Sunkist Kids Wrestling Club
- Team: USA
Medal record
Men's freestyle wrestling
Representing the United States
Olympic Games
Gold medal – first place	1984 Los Angeles	82 kg
World Championships
Gold medal – first place	1985 Budapest	82 kg
Gold medal – first place	1987 Clermont-Ferrand	82 kg
Pan American Games
Gold medal – first place	1987 Indianapolis	82 kg
Collegiate Wrestling
Representing the Oklahoma Sooners
NCAA Division I Championships
Gold medal – first place	1981 Princeton	167 lb
Gold medal – first place	1982 Ames	177 lb
Gold medal – first place	1983 Oklahoma City	177 lb

Mark Philip Schultz (born October 26, 1960) is an Olympic Champion American freestyle wrestler. Schultz was a 3-time NCAA champion, Olympic champion and 2-time World champion. In 1995, Schultz was inducted into the National Wrestling Hall of Fame as a Distinguished Member. He is also in the San Jose Sports Hall of Fame, the California Wrestling Hall of Fame, and the San Mateo Peninsula Sports Hall of Fame.

He and his older brother, wrestler Dave Schultz, both won gold medals in wrestling in the same Olympics (1984). They are the only American brothers to win both World and Olympic gold, and have won more NCAA, U.S. Open, World, and Olympic titles than any other American brother combination in history.

He ended his career in the UFC IX under NHB (no-holds-barred) rules vs UFC VIII runner-up Gary "Big Daddy" Goodridge. His life story is in the book "Foxcatcher" a NY Times best seller & Amazon's "Editor's Pick".

== Early life ==
Mark Schultz was born in 1960 in Palo Alto, California to Dorothy Jean St. Germain (née Rich) and Philip Gary Schultz. He was their second son; first-born Dave Schultz was 17 months older. They had two half-siblings, Michael and Seana. Schultz is of half Belarusian-Jewish and half British/Irish/French/German descent. His paternal grandparents were Estelle (Bernstein), the daughter of a prominent paper company executive, and Maxwell I. Schultz, a business consultant. His maternal grandparents were Dorothy (Starks), a radiologist who graduated from Stanford Medical School, and Willis Rich, a Stanford ichthyology professor, inventor of the salmon ladder and discoverer of the "home stream theory" that salmon return to the rivers where they were born in order to spawn before they die. The boys attended local schools. Schultz got interested in gymnastics and started competing.

== Athletic career ==
=== High school career ===
Mark Schultz attended Palo Alto High School, where he was coached by Ed Hart. Mark competed first in gymnastics, winning the Northern California All-Around Gymnastics Championships in the 15-16 year old age group.

During his junior year in high school, he moved to Ashland, Oregon and switched to Tang Soo Do at Bob Barrow Karate. After he got in a fight with his brother Dave, he quit Tang Soo Do and tried out for the Ashland High School wrestling team at 130 lbs. After one semester at Ashland he got kicked off the varsity by the coach for not winning enough. Mark complained to the Principal over the coach's decision to drop him even though he made the team under the coach's system by winning 10 of 11 challenge matches in the first 10 weeks. The Principal forced the coach to restore Mark to varsity status but going to the Principal killed the relationship with the coach so he transferred back to Palo Alto High School, was declared ineligible ending his junior year with a 4–6 record. Over the summer of 1977 Mark grew several inches and gained 30 lbs. The Palo Alto High wrestling coach was also Mark's gymnastics coach, Ed Hart.

Mark started his senior year for Palo Alto High at 154 lbs and won every dual meet. Coach Hart scheduled three 16-team tournaments. Mark broke his big toe and couldn't compete in the 1st tournament at Cabrillo College. At the Alisal Tournament, Mark lost his first match and was eliminated. At the Monta Vista Invitational, Mark took 3rd. At the end his senior year, he won the Santa Clara Valley Athletic League (9 schools), the Region (20 schools), and the Central Coast Section (90 schools). At the Central Coast Section, Mark defeated defending Champion Joe Guillory from James Lick High, whose only loss that year was to Mark's teammate at 165 lbs, Jeff Newman. Mark was named Central Coast Section Outstanding Wrestler. At the 1978 California State Championships over 800 schools were represented. Mark defeated 3 undefeated wrestlers to win state and was named 1978 Palo Alto High School "Athlete of the Year". Mark's official high school record is 34–8.

Mark is still the only California High School State Wrestling Champion to never win a tournament prior to the state qualifiers. In contrast, Mark's brother Dave Schultz had the greatest high school senior year in U.S. history. The National Wrestling Hall of Fame gives out an award each year to the best wrestler from every state and one for the entire country called the "Dave Schultz High School Excellence Award." Many people attribute Mark's rapid improvement at the end of his senior year to training with his brother Dave, but Mark never trained with Dave until the summer after Mark's senior year. The Schultz brothers won more NCAA, World, and Olympic titles than any brother combination in U.S. history.

=== Collegiate career ===
Schultz was voted by his peers "College Wrestler of the decade" in the book "The Golden Era of Amateur Wrestling: 1980's" by Reginald Rowe. Schultz attended UCLA and went 18–8 at 150 & 158 lbs his freshman year. In the summer of 1979 Mark and Dave Schultz made the Junior World Team, met Oklahoma Assistant coach Jim Humphrey who convinced them to transfer to Oklahoma University. In August, 1979 Mark and Dave Schultz transferred to the University of Oklahoma & redshirted. During Mark and Dave's redshirt year Dave won every tournament he entered while Mark failed to place at every tournament. Mark was unranked among the top 20 wrestlers in the nation until November 1980 when Schultz defeated #1 ranked Mike DeAnna 8–1 in the finals of the Great Plains Tournament in Lincoln, Nebraska. Schultz went from being unranked one week to ranked 2nd the next week. In the following three years (1981–83) Mark won three NCAA titles. Schultz was the NCAA Champion his sophomore year at 167 lbs. He defeated his Great Plains opponent, Iowa Hawkeye senior Mike DeAnna 10–4 in the 1981 NCAA Finals in Princeton, NJ. Matt Reiss, 1980 NCAA Champion at 167 lbs took 8th at 167 in 1981. Schultz moved up to 177 lbs his junior year where he faced another Iowa Hawkeye in the NCAA finals, two-time NCAA Champion (1980, 1981) Ed Banach. Schultz had lost to Banach 4 times before 1982. Schultz said Banach was the best conditioned wrestler he ever faced and saw him run a mile in about 5 minutes. A month before the 1982 NCAA's Schultz defeated Banach 10–9 in the Oklahoma vs. Iowa dual meet at Lloyd Noble Arena. The 2 teams ended the dual in a 19–19 tie. In 1982 the 1980 NCAA Champion at 167 lbs, Matt Reiss, moved up weight so there were 4 NCAA titles represented at 177 lbs. Banach was exceptional defeating every opponent except one in the 1980, 1981, and 1982 NCAA's by fall or superior decision. Banach was on track to become the first 4-time NCAA champion in history; however, Schultz won 16–8 in "one of, if not the best, NCAA finals match of all time" and was named Outstanding Wrestler for the tournament. In 1983 Schultz set the University of Oklahoma record for most victories (27) in an undefeated season and was voted Oklahoma University Student-Athlete of the year. In the 1983 NCAA's in Oklahoma City, Schultz defeated Duane Goldman 4–2, the 3rd Iowa Hawkeye he faced in the NCAA finals.

=== Olympics and World championships ===
In 1984, Mark and Dave Schultz both won Olympic gold in wrestling events, as did the American twin Banach brothers. The following year, Mark won the World Championships and faced competitors from all the Eastern bloc countries who had boycotted the 1984 Olympics. In the World finals, Mark built a 10–2 lead after one minute and won 10–5. Mark Schultz is the only 1984 Olympic Champion to win the 1985 World Championships; his brother Dave was the only 1984 Olympic Champion to have won the 1983 World Championships. When Schultz won another World Championship in 1987, he became the first Olympic Champion to win two additional World titles; he tied Lee Kemp's U.S. record for World golds. In 1991, Mark Schultz, Lee Kemp, and John Smith were in the Guinness Book of World Records for "Most World or Olympic titles by a U.S. wrestler."

Before the 1988 Olympics, Mark was working as an Assistant Coach at Villanova University and competing for multi-millionaire John E. du Pont's wrestling club, Team Foxcatcher. In 1987, du Pont threatened Mark by saying "I'm going to ruin your career" in a locker room, in front of wrestler Dan Chaid. Mark quit wrestling after the 1988 Olympics.

At the Olympic Trials Mark made the 1988 Olympic Team in the most dominating performance of his life, defeating 2-time NCAA Wrestling Champion and NCAA Outstanding Wrestler Mike Sheets 13–1. During the Olympics, it occurred to Mark it would be immoral to give John du Pont the prestige and status of "producing" an Olympic champion, so Mark threw his match to his opponent from Turkey, losing 14–0 as an act of protest against duPont and USA Wrestling's lack of support. Mark never wrestled again.

=== Coaching and mixed martial arts ===
After eight years in retirement from wrestling competition, Schultz became the first Olympic gold medalist to enter the Ultimate Fighting Championship (UFC). With one day's notice Schultz replaced Dave Beneteau at UFC 9 in 1996, facing off against the UFC 8 runner-up, Canadian Gary Goodridge. He won the bout by doctor stoppage due to a cut. Schultz was paid $50,000 for his victory. In 2013, Schultz was ranked by bloodyelbow.com as the greatest wrestler in UFC history. At the time, he was a Head Coach of wrestling at Brigham Young University.

=== Coaching and competition ===
Schultz was the assistant wrestling coach at Brigham Young University from 1991 to 1994, then he was named Head Coach. In 1993, Schultz had his first Brazilian jiu-jitsu experience in a match with Rickson Gracie. At the time, only two non-Gracie family members were jiu-jitsu black belts. One was Pedro Sauer who coached Mark for 3 years prior to UFC 9 (where Mark defeated Gary Goodridge). Mark was awarded a black belt from Walt Bayless

== Personal life ==
Mark has five children.

On January 26, 1996, Mark's brother Dave, who worked as a coach for "Team Foxcatcher" founder multimillionaire John du Pont, was shot and killed by du Pont, who had been displaying increasingly odd behavior in the months before the murder. Four months after Dave's murder, Mark competed in and won an early mixed martial arts event at UFC 9. In 1991 Mark joined the Church of Jesus Christ of Latter-day Saints. In 2022 Schultz left the LDS Church after reading No Man Knows My History by Fawn Brodie which challenges many LDS truth claims. However, Schultz considers the "rank and file members of the church" as some of the most honest, intelligent, hard working, family oriented people he ever met and his experience as the BYU Head Wrestling Coach was a positive one.

== In media ==
- "Wrestling Demons, Mark Schultz's Ultimate Victory" (2023) was nominated for an Emmy Award in 2023 for "BEST SHORT DOCUMENTARY" produced by the Ultimate Fighting Championships, directed by Ben Chiliberti as an episode in the animated series "FIGHT LORE". UFC President Dana White was Executive Producer. It is now available to watch for free on YouTube Wrestling Demons, Mark Schultz's Ultimate Victory
- Foxcatcher (2014) is a feature film written by E. Maxe Frye and Dan Futterman, directed by Bennett Miller, and starring Steve Carell as du Pont, Channing Tatum as Mark, and Mark Ruffalo as Dave Schultz.
- Mark Schultz wrote a New York Times best-selling memoir, Foxcatcher: The True Story of My Brother's Murder, John du Pont's Madness, and the Quest for Olympic Gold (2014) published the same year as the film was released.
- In 2015, director Jesse Vile produced the ESPN 30 for 30 documentary The Prince of Pennsylvania starring Mark Schultz, Rob Calabrese, Dan Chaid, Taras Wochuk, Tony DeHaven, and du Pont's wife Gale Wenk. It tells the true story of Team Foxcatcher and the murder of Dave Schultz.
- In The Golden Era of Amateur Wrestling: 1980's by Reginald Rowe, Schultz was voted by his peers as the greatest collegiate wrestler of the 1980s. Ed Banach, Mark's opponent in the 1982 NCAA finals, was ranked 2nd greatest collegiate wrestler of the 1980s. Ed Banach is a 3-time NCAA Champion and an Olympic Champion. Banach is considered one of the most conditioned athletes of all time.

== Athletic titles ==
- 1976 Northern California All-Around Gymnastics Champion (15-16 year old age group).
- 1978 California High School State Wrestling Champion.
- 1980 Great Plains Champion at 167 lbs.
- 1981 Great Plains Champion at 177 lbs.
- 1981 Tbilisi silver medalist. Mark won only 3 silver medals (Tbilisi, Midlands, Big 8) and no bronze medals.
- 1981, 1982, 1983 NCAA Champion (defeated an Iowa Hawkeye in the finals 3 years in a row).
- 1981–1983 Nominated 3 times for "Oklahoma Headliner of the Year" Award.
- 1981 NCAA Champion defeating Mike DeAnna 10–4 in the finals. (Princeton, NJ)
- 1982 NCAA Champion defeating 2x NCAA Champion Ed Banach.
- 1982 Unanimously voted NCAA "Outstanding Wrestler".
- 1982 World Cup Champion. Defeated Vagit Kasibekov, (Russia) in the finals 7–2.
- 1982–1983 won the last 44 matches of his college career.
- 1983 Set the University of Oklahoma record for most victories in a single season without a loss.
- 1984–1988 Undefeated in the U.S. for 4 years.
- 1983–1988 Made 6 World and Olympic teams in a row.
- 1984 Olympic Champion.
- 1985 World Champion. Was the only 1984 Olympic Champion to win the 1985 World Championships.
- 1985 Mark and Dave Schultz become the only American brothers to win World and Olympic Titles.
- 1985 Wrestling Masters Magazine "International Wrestler of the Year"
- 1984, 1985, 1986, 1987 U.S. Open Freestyle Champion.
- 1983, 1985, 1987 National Sports Festival Champion.
- 1987 Pan American Games Champion.
- 1987 World Champion. 1st American to win the Olympics and 2 World titles.
- 1987 USA Wrestling Athlete of the Year.
- 1987 Sullivan Award Nominee.
- 1987 Olympian Magazine Sportsman of the Year.
- 1991 Mark Schultz, John Smith, Lee Kemp were listed in the Guinness Book of World Records for Most World titles by an American.
- 1995 Inducted into the National Wrestling Hall of Fame.
- 1996 Won the Ultimate Fighting Championships IX. Retired with a 1-0 No-holds-barred record.
- 2000 Inducted into the California Wrestling Hall of Fame.
- 2010 Inducted into the San Jose Sports Hall of Fame.
- 2013 Awarded the Lifetime Service Award by the California Chapter of the National Wrestling Hall of Fame.
- 2015 Inducted into the San Mateo Peninsula Sports Hall of Fame.
- 2015 Mark's autobiography "Foxcatcher" is turned into a 5-time Oscar nominated motion picture. Foxcatcher becomes a New York Times best-seller.
- 2016 In "The Golden Era of Amateur Wrestling: 1980's" by Reginald Rowe, Schultz was voted by his peers as the greatest collegiate wrestler of the 1980s.
- 2020 Mark's autobiography "Foxcatcher" becomes an Amazon "Editor's Pick."
- 2023 Mark's autobiography becomes an Emmy-nominated documentary called "Wrestling Demons, Mark Schultz's Ultimate Victory" directed by Ben Chiliberti.

== Mixed martial arts record ==
Res.	Record	Opponent	Method	Event	Date	Round	Time	Location	Notes
Win	1–0	Gary Goodridge	TKO (cut)	UFC 9	May 17, 1996	1	12:00	Detroit, Michigan, United States	Schultz was entered in as a late replacement for Dave Beneteau, who broke his hand training with Schultz.
