= William Rosado =

American wrestler (born 1955)

Personal information
- Full name: William John Rosado
- Nickname: "Billy"
- Nationality: United States
- Born: October 23, 1955 (age 70) Wiltshire, England
- Home town: Tucson, Arizona, U.S.

Sport
- Country: United States
- Sport: Wrestling
- Event: Freestyle
- College team: Arizona State
- Club: Sunkist Kids Wrestling Club
- Team: USA
Medal record
Men's freestyle wrestling
Representing the United States
World Championships
Bronze medal – third place	1981 Skopje	48 kg
World Super Championships
Gold medal – first place	1980 Nagoya	48 kg
Pan American Games
Gold medal – first place	1979 San Juan	48 kg

William John "Billy" Rosado (born October 23, 1955) is an American wrestler. He competed in the men's freestyle 48 kg at the 1976 Summer Olympics. He also was a bronze medalist at the 1981 World Wrestling Championships.
