= Ed Banach =

American wrestler (born 1960)

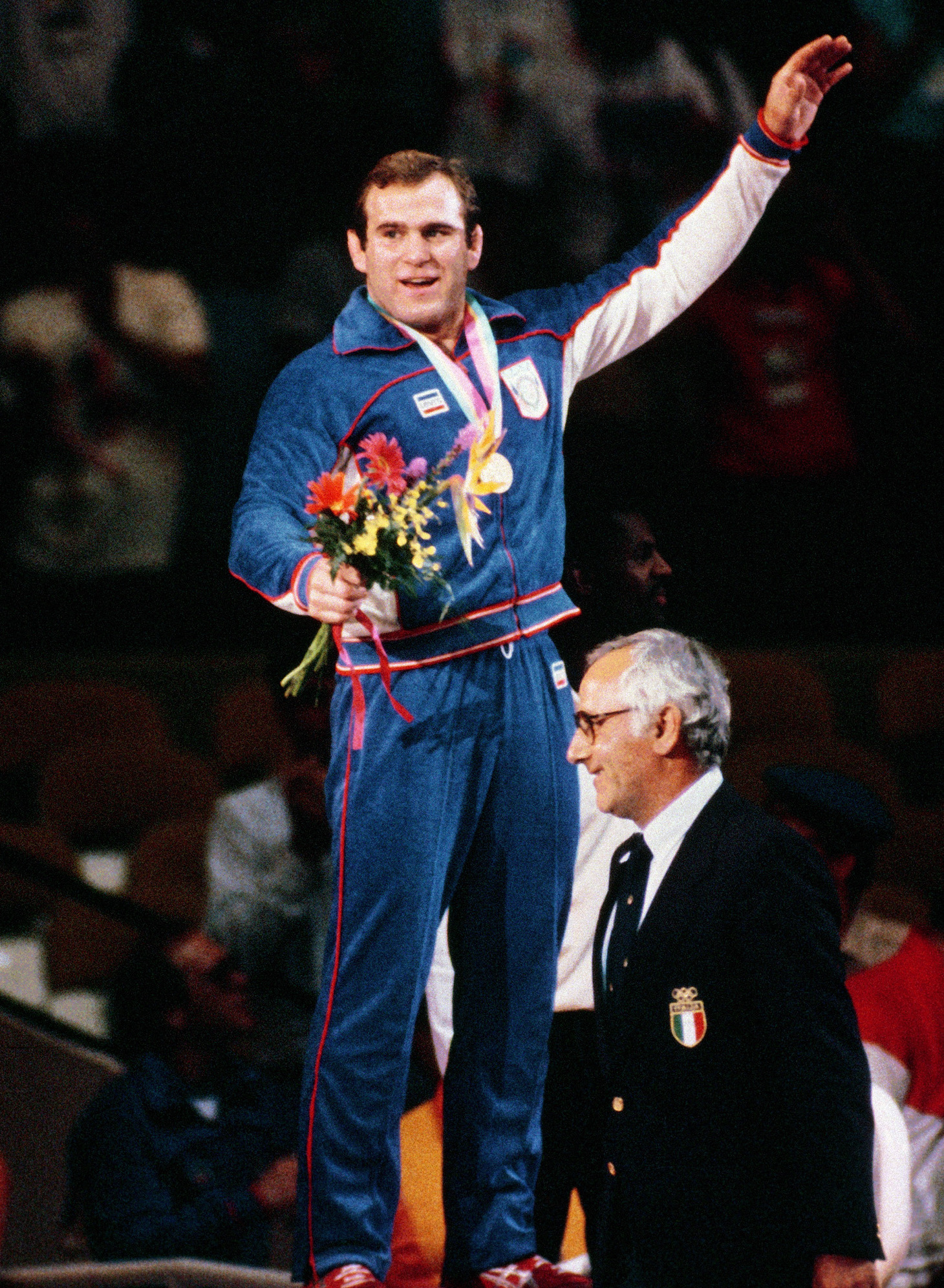
- Ed Banach in 1984

Personal information
- Full name: Edward Joseph Banach
- Born: February 6, 1960 (age 66) Sussex County, New Jersey, U.S.
- Home town: Port Jervis, New York, U.S.
- Height: 5 ft 10 in (178 cm)
- Weight: 198 lb (90 kg)

Sport
- Country: United States
- Sport: Wrestling
- Events: Freestyle; Folkstyle
- College team: Iowa
- Club: Hawkeye Wrestling Club
- Team: USA
- Coached by: Dan Gable
Medal record
Men's freestyle wrestling
Representing the United States
Olympic Games
| Gold medal – first place | 1984 Los Angeles | 90 kg |
Collegiate Wrestling
Representing the Iowa Hawkeyes
NCAA Division I Championships
| Gold medal – first place | 1980 Corvallis | 177 lb |
| Gold medal – first place | 1981 Princeton | 177 lb |
| Gold medal – first place | 1983 Oklahoma City | 190 lb |
| Silver medal – second place | 1982 Ames | 177 lb |
Big Ten Championships
| Gold medal – first place | 1980 East Lansing | 177 lb |
| Gold medal – first place | 1981 Madison | 177 lb |
| Gold medal – first place | 1982 Ann Arbor | 177 lb |
| Gold medal – first place | 1983 Iowa City | 190 lb |

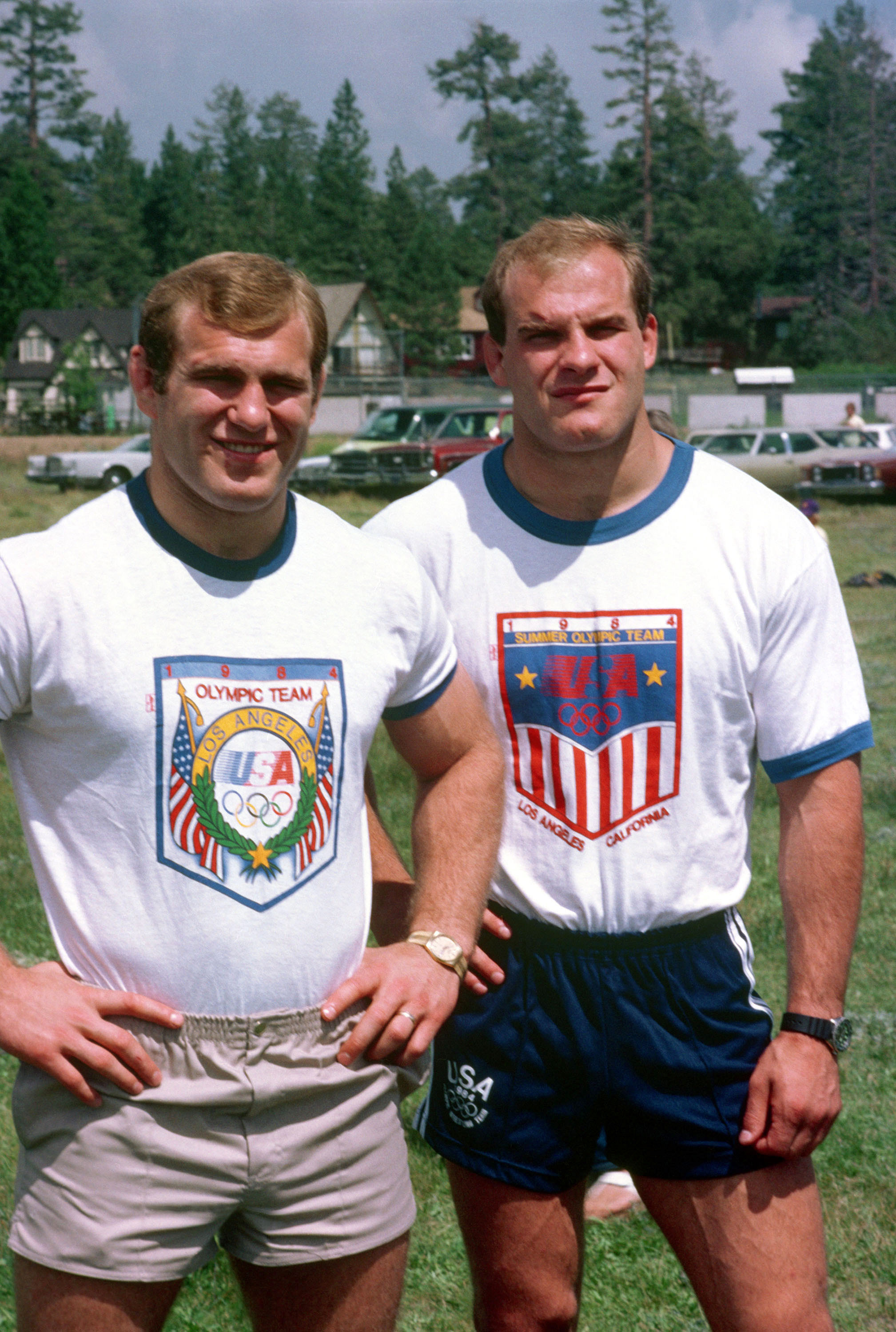
Ed Banach (left) with his twin brother Lou Banach, August 1984

Edward Joseph "Ed" Banach (born February 6, 1960) is an athlete who won a gold medal in wrestling in the 1984 Summer Olympics. He wrestled for the University of Iowa under coach Dan Gable from 1980 to 1983, where he was a four-time NCAA All-American, and a three-time NCAA national champion (1980, 1981, and 1983). He was named the 1983 Big Ten Athlete of the Year.

Banach and his twin brother Lou Banach were noted for both winning gold medals in wrestling in the 1984 Olympic Games, as did the Schultz brothers, Dave and Mark.

== Early life and education ==
Ed and Lou Banach are fraternal twin brothers born in Sussex County, New Jersey, sons of Wraclaw and Genevieve Banach, immigrants from Poland and Germany, respectively. They have an older brother Steve, born in 1958. Their family broke up when they were young, after their house was destroyed in a fire and their father left. Their mother suffered a nervous breakdown, and the children had to be put in care.

The twins and their brother Steve were all adopted by Alan and Stephanie Tooley of Montague Township, New Jersey. The family moved to Port Jervis, New York, where the three boys all became involved in football and wrestling in high school. The twins were established as the best wrestlers in Port Jervis history by the time they graduated in 1978. Ed Banach was "so quick, so strong, so tough they called him, 'The Horse.'"

The three brothers all attended college on wrestling scholarships; Steve at Clemson University and the twins both at the University of Iowa. Ed Banach wrestled at Iowa competitively from 1980 to 1983. He was a standout wrestler, with a career record of 141-9-1 and the school record for most pins in a career (73). Banach was a four-time NCAA All-American, and a three-time NCAA national champion in Division I (1980, 1981, and 1983). He was named the 1983 Big Ten Athlete of the Year.

== Olympic Gold ==
In 1984 the Banach twins competed in two different weight classes in wrestling at the 1984 Summer Olympics in Los Angeles, California. Ed Banach defeated Akira Ota of Japan 15–3 in the 198-pound freestyle gold-medal match. Both men won gold medals, as did the American Schultz brothers. Wrestling at lower weight classes than the Banachs, the Schultzes became the first American brothers to win gold medals in the same Olympics in wrestling. However, the Banach brothers have the distinction of being the first American twin brothers to win the gold medal in the same Olympics in wrestling.

Ed Banach defeated Ota while suffering from a concussion, the last of 15 that he had incurred on his way to the Olympics. He has suffered from post-concussion syndrome, long before it was identified as a sports risk to wrestlers, boxers, and football players.

== Career ==
Banach stayed involved in sports and served as assistant coach at Iowa State University until 1987. After suffering for 14 months with a migraine after getting hit in practice, he decided he had to retire. Although it was the end of his athletic career, Banach runs a spring wrestling clinic in Ames, Iowa, where he continues to live.

== Personal life ==
Banach married while he was at Iowa; his wife was a dental hygiene student. They have a son who started competing in wrestling in high school. Ed has enjoyed advising him, but cannot "get on the mat" with him to show him any moves.

== Honors ==
- In 1997 Banach was inducted into the University of Iowa Athletics Hall of Fame.
- In 2002, he was inducted into the National Wrestling Hall of Fame; his plaque reads, "a thoroughbred in all respects."
- Port Jervis, New York installed a blue-and-gold sign in town honoring Ed and Lou Banach as Olympic champions.
