= Tim Vanni =

American wrestler (born 1961)

Personal information
- Born: February 2, 1961 (age 65) Van Nuys, California, U.S.
- Height: 5 ft 1 in (155 cm)
- Weight: 48 kg (106 lb)

Sport
- Country: United States
- Sport: Wrestling
- Event: Freestyle
- College team: Cal State Bakersfield
- Club: Sunkist Kids Wrestling Club
- Team: USA
Medal record
Men's freestyle wrestling
Representing the United States
World Cup
Silver medal – second place	1990 Toledo	48 kg
Bronze medal – third place	1986 Toledo	48 kg
Pan American Games
Silver medal – second place	1987 Indianapolis	48 kg
Bronze medal – third place	1991 Havana	48 kg
Bronze medal – third place	1995 Mar del Plata	48 kg

Timothy ("Tim") Mark Vanni (born February 2, 1961) is a two-time USA Olympic freestyle wrestler. He finished fourth in the 1988 Games in Seoul and fifth in the 1992 Games in Barcelona. Vanni also competed at six World Championships, and is a five-time Senior U.S. national champion.

He is currently a physical education teacher and wrestling coach for Porterville High School in Porterville, California. He married Karen Cronin in 2002.
