= 1981 NCAA Division I Wrestling Championships =

American collegiate wrestling tournament

Coordinates: 40.34317°N 74.64867°W

Tournament information
- Sport: College wrestling
- Location: Princeton, New Jersey
- Dates: March 12, 1981–March 14, 1981
- Host: Princeton University
- Venue: Jadwin Gymnasium

Final positions
- Champions: Iowa (6th title)
- 1st runners-up: Oklahoma
- 2nd runners-up: Iowa State

Tournament statistics
- Attendance: 41,692
- MVP: Gene Mills (Syracuse)

The 1981 NCAA Division I Wrestling Championships were the 51st NCAA Division I Wrestling Championships to be held. Princeton University in Princeton, New Jersey hosted the tournament at Jadwin Gymnasium.

Iowa took home the team championship with 129.75 points and having two individual champions.

Gene Mills of Syracuse was named the Most Outstanding Wrestler and Jerry Kelly of Oklahoma State received the Gorriaran Award.

== Team results ==
Rank	School	Points
1	Iowa	129.75
2	Oklahoma	100.25
3	Iowa State	84.75
4	Oklahoma State	68.5
5	Lehigh	38
6	Penn State	31.75
7	Syracuse	30.5
8	Central Michigan	28.75
9	Auburn	25.75
10	Oregon State	25.25

== Individual finals ==
Weight class	Championship match (champion in boldface)
118 lbs	**Gene Mills**, Syracuse WBF John Hartupee, Central Michigan, 6:35
126 lbs	**Dan Cuestas**, Cal State-Bakersfield DEC Dave Cooke, North Carolina, 7–5
134 lbs	**Jim Gibbons**, Iowa State MAJOR Darryl Burley, Lehigh, 16–8
142 lbs	**Andre Metzger**, Oklahoma DEC Lenny Zalesky, Iowa, 10–6
150 lbs	**Nate Carr**, Iowa State DEC Scott Trizzino, Iowa, 10–5
158 lbs	**Ricky Stewart**, Oklahoma State WBF Dave Schultz, Oklahoma, 4:56
167 lbs	**Mark Schultz**, Oklahoma DEC Mike DeAnna, Iowa 10–4
177 lbs	**Ed Banach**, Iowa WBF Charlie Heller, Clarion, 4:15
190 lbs	**Tom Martucci**, College of New Jersey DEC Tony Mantella, Temple, 4–3
UNL	**Lou Banach**, Iowa WBF Bruce Baumgartner, Indiana State, 5:45
