= Gene Mills =

American wrestler (born 1958)

Personal information
- Born: September 28, 1958 (age 68)
- Home town: Pompton Lakes, New Jersey, U.S.

Sport
- Country: United States
- Sport: Wrestling
- Event: Freestyle
- College team: Syracuse University Club Wrestling
- Team: USA
Medal record
Men's freestyle wrestling
Representing the United States
World Super Championships
Gold medal – first place	1980 Japan	52 kg
World Cup (team)
Gold medal – first place	1980 Toledo	52 kg
World Cup (individual)
Gold medal – first place	1980 Toledo	52 kg
Gold medal – first place	1981 Toledo	52 kg
Pan American Games
Gold medal – first place	1979 San Juan	52 kg
Tbilisi International Tournament
Gold medal – first place	1980 Tbilisi	52 kg
Collegiate Wrestling
Representing the Syracuse University Club Wrestling
NCAA Division I Championships
Gold medal – first place	1979 Ames	118 lb
Gold medal – first place	1981 Princeton	118 lb

Gene Mills (born September 28, 1958) is an American freestyle wrestler and wrestling coach. Competing at 118 pounds, Mills was a two-time NCAA Division I national champion for Syracuse University and a member of the 1980 United States Olympic freestyle wrestling team. Known for his high rate of victories by fall, Mills set the NCAA Division I record for career pins with 107, earning him the nickname "Mean Gene the Pinning Machine." He is a Distinguished Member of the National Wrestling Hall of Fame.

== Early life and high school ==
Raised in Pompton Lakes, New Jersey, Mills wrestled for DePaul Catholic High School in Wayne, New Jersey. In his senior year in 1976, Mills won the NJSIAA state championship at 108 pounds, securing the first state wrestling title in DePaul Catholic's history.

== Collegiate career ==
Wrestling for Syracuse University, Mills became the program's first and only four-time NCAA Division I All-American. He won two NCAA Division I national championships at 118 pounds in 1979 and 1981, and was also voted the NCAA tournament's Outstanding Wrestler.

Mills concluded his collegiate career with an overall record of 144-5-1. He amassed 107 career pins, establishing an NCAA Division I record.

Mills earned a B.A. in psychology in 1981 and his master's in physical education from Syracuse University in 1998.

== Freestyle and international career ==
In international freestyle wrestling, Mills competed at 52 kg (114.5 lbs). In 1979, he won the gold medal at the Pan American Games in Puerto Rico. In 1980, he won the Tbilisi International Tournament in the Soviet Union. Mills pinned every opponent he faced in the tournament and was voted the Outstanding Wrestler of the event, a tournament that one American coach characterized as "probably five times as tough" as the Olympic Games.

Mills won the United States Olympic Trials and was named to the 1980 U.S. Olympic team. Due to the 1980 Summer Olympics boycott, he did not compete in Moscow. Prior to the boycott, Mills had already pinned the eventual gold, silver, and bronze medalists of the 1980 Olympic Games in other international competitions.

Beyond his Olympic qualification, Mills was a three-time FILA World Cup Champion. Later in 1980, Mills won a gold medal at the World Super Championship in Japan, where he was also voted the tournament's Outstanding Wrestler. He remained a competitive force on the international stage for several more years, later making the 1985 U.S World Team.

Across all levels of competition, Mills amassed an overall record of 1,356-46-1 with 886 victories by fall. He defeated top-tier opponents across three different weight categories:

- 52 kg: Defeated reigning Olympic and World champion Anatoly Beloglazov, as well as 1984 Olympic champion Bobby Weaver.
- 57 kg: Defeated three-time European champion and World Championships medalist Stefan Ivanov during a USA vs Bulgaria dual meet.
- 65 kg: Moved up significantly in weight to win the 1985 Midlands Tournament, where he defeated top-ranked U.S. wrestler Kevin Dresser and was voted the tournament's Outstanding Wrestler.

== Coaching career ==
Following his competitive collegiate career, Mills served as an assistant wrestling coach at Syracuse University for 16 seasons, concluding his tenure with a program record of 147-81-4. During this era, he also served as a head coach for the United States national freestyle wrestling team in international competition between 1985 and 1991, as well as the head coach of the Mohawk Valley Wrestling Club. In 1986, Mills became the camp director of the Syracuse University Big Orange Wrestling School. Following the university's decision to discontinue the intercollegiate wrestling program in 2001, Mills actively campaigned and fundraised in an attempt to revive the sport at Syracuse.

Mills later served as the head wrestling coach at Phoenix High School in New York. He also established the "Pin2Win" wrestling camps and ran regional training clinics.

== Awards and honors ==
- 1976: NJSIAA State Champion (108 lbs).
- 1979: NCAA Division I National Champion (118 lbs).
- 1979: Pan American Games Gold Medalist.
- 1980: Tbilisi International Tournament Winner and Outstanding Wrestler.
- 1980: World Superchampionship Winner and Outstanding Wrestler
- 1980: FILA World Cup Champion.
- 1980: Named AAU Outstanding Freestyle Wrestler.
- 1980: Named United States Olympic Committee (USOC) Athlete of the Year for wrestling.
- 1981: NCAA Division I National Champion (118 lbs) and Outstanding Wrestler.
- 1981: FILA World Cup Champion.
- 1982: FILA World Cup Runner-up.
- 1982: Won the AAU Freestyle National Tournament title.
- 1985: Member of the United States World Team.
- 1985: Midlands Tournament Champion (65 kg) and Outstanding Wrestler.
- 1991: Inducted into the Greater Syracuse Sports Hall of Fame.
- 1998: Inducted into the Eastern Intercollegiate Wrestling Association (EIWA) Hall of Fame.
- 2000: Inducted as a Distinguished Member into the National Wrestling Hall of Fame.
