= Dave Schultz (amateur wrestler) =

American wrestler (1959–1996)

Personal information
- Full name: David Lesley Schultz
- Born: June 6, 1959 Palo Alto, California, U.S.
- Died: January 26, 1996 (aged 36) Newtown Square, Pennsylvania, U.S.
- Height: 5 ft 10 in (178 cm)
- Weight: 74 kg (163 lb)

Sport
- Country: United States
- Sport: Wrestling
- Events: Freestyle and Folkstyle
- College team: Oklahoma; Oklahoma State
- Club: Sunkist Kids Wrestling Club
- Team: USA
Medal record
Men's freestyle wrestling
Representing the United States
Olympic Games
| Gold medal – first place | 1984 Los Angeles | 74 kg |
World Championships
| Gold medal – first place | 1983 Kyiv | 74 kg |
| Silver medal – second place | 1985 Budapest | 74 kg |
| Silver medal – second place | 1987 Clermont | 74 kg |
| Silver medal – second place | 1993 Toronto | 74 kg |
| Bronze medal – third place | 1982 Edmonton | 82 kg |
| Bronze medal – third place | 1986 Budapest | 74 kg |
Pan American Games
| Gold medal – first place | 1987 Indianapolis | 74 kg |
| Bronze medal – third place | 1995 Mar del Plata | 74 kg |
Goodwill Games
| Gold medal – first place | 1986 Moscow | 74 kg |
| Silver medal – second place | 1994 St. Petersburg | 74 kg |
Collegiate Wrestling
NCAA Division I Championships
Representing the Oklahoma Sooners
| Gold medal – first place | 1982 Ames | 167 lb |
| Silver medal – second place | 1981 Princeton | 158 lb |
Representing the Oklahoma State Cowboys
| Bronze medal – third place | 1978 College Park | 150 lb |

David Lesley Schultz (June 6, 1959 – January 26, 1996) was an American Olympic and World champion freestyle wrestler, and a seven-time World and Olympic medalist. He coached individuals and teams at the college level and also privately.

Dave and his brother, wrestler Mark Schultz, both won gold at the same Olympics (1984). The Schultzes were one of three sets of brothers (the others are Buvaisar and Adam Saitiev, and Anatoli and Sergei Beloglazov) to win both World and Olympic championships. The Schultz brothers have won more NCAA, World, and Olympic titles than any other American brother combination in history.

Schultz was employed as a coach by John du Pont, a multimillionaire philanthropist who sponsored the private Foxcatcher wrestling team at an amateur sports center known as Foxcatcher Farm that he set up on his estate in Pennsylvania. In January 1996, Schultz was murdered by du Pont, who was convicted of third-degree murder and sentenced to thirteen to thirty years in prison.

== Early life ==
David Lesley Schultz was born in Palo Alto, California, to Dorothy Jean St. Germain (née Rich) and Phillip Gary Schultz. He was the brother of Mark Schultz, and two half-siblings – Michael and Seana. Schultz was of half Hungarian-Jewish Belarusian-Jewish and half British/Irish/French/German descent. His paternal grandparents were Estelle (Bernstein), the daughter of a prominent paper company executive, and Maxwell L. Schultz, a business consultant. His maternal grandparents were Dorothy (Starks), a radiologist who graduated from Stanford Medical School #1 in her class, and Willis Rich, a Stanford ichthyology professor, inventor of the salmon ladder and discoverer of the "home stream theory" that salmon return to the rivers where they were born in order to spawn before they die. He said in a video that he was a Christian by faith.

As a young child, Dave was overweight (nicknamed "Pudge"), and was often bullied at school by classmates for his weight and appearance. He also had dyslexia, which many of his teachers mistook for mental disabilities.

Schultz began wrestling in the 7th grade at Ashland Junior High School in Ashland Oregon. Then he transferred to David Starr Jordan Middle School in Palo Alto and wrestled under coach Robert Hoskins. In 1977 as a senior at Palo Alto High School, he became state champion. That year he also won both his first national and international wrestling titles. As a high school senior he pinned 2-time NCAA champion and NCAA "Outstanding Wrestler" Chuck Yagla and World Cup Champion Joe Tice at the Great Plains Championships. His brother Mark started competing in sports in gymnastics, winning the Northern California All-Around Gymnastics Championships in his age group. In his junior year he switched to wrestling, and in his senior year won state.

== Wrestling career ==
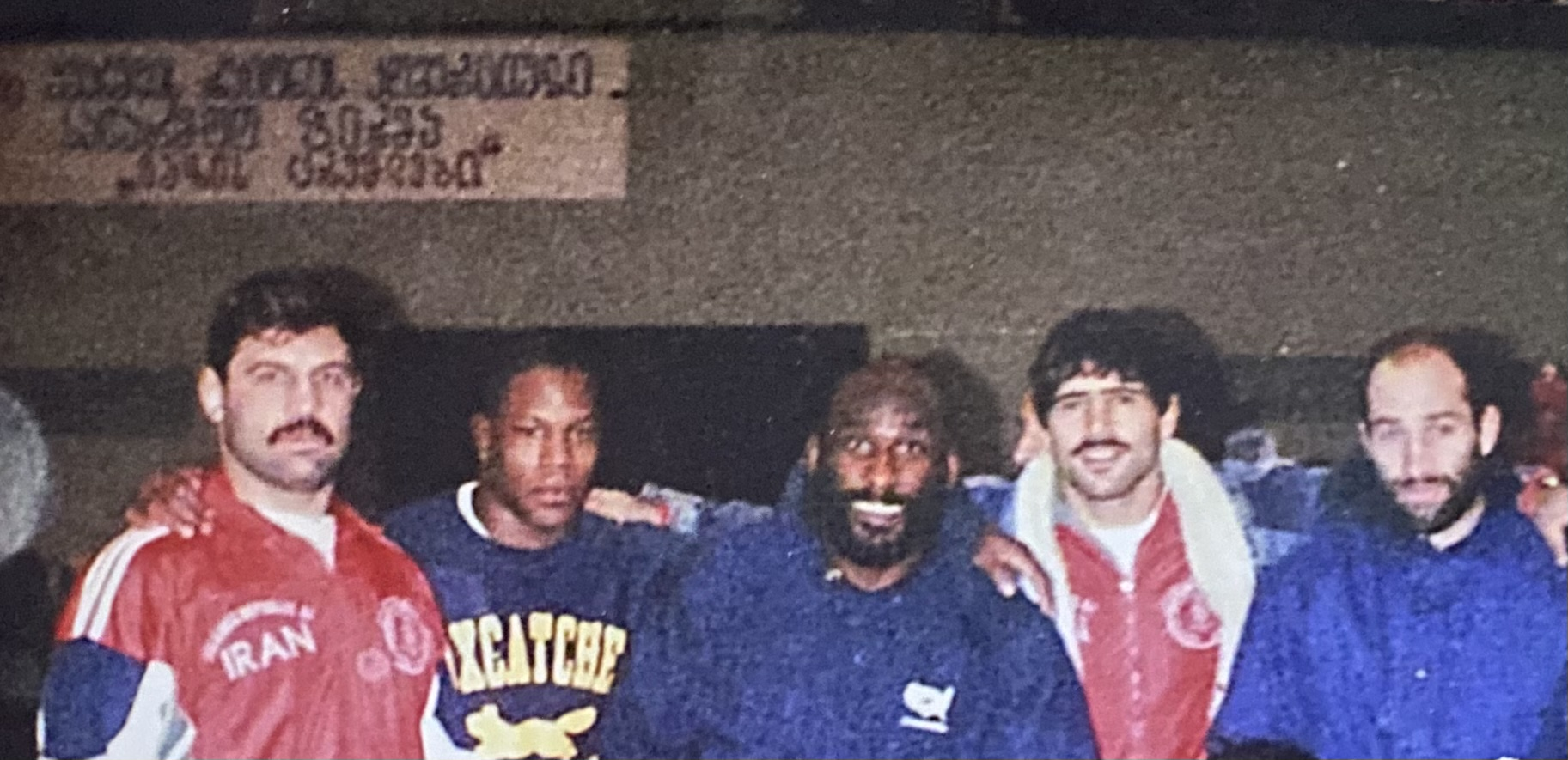
Dave Schultz (on far right) with (L-R) Mohammad Reza Tupchi, Chris Campbell, Kevin Jackson, and Abbas Jadidi.

=== High school career ===
Schultz's high school wrestling records included winning first place in the prestigious Great Plains freestyle tournament, which qualified him to compete on his first U.S. international team in the Tbilisi Tournament in then-Soviet Georgia. The Tbilisi Tournament is considered by many experts in the wrestling community to be the "toughest tournament in the world." Schultz earned a silver medal and was the highest-placing American at the tournament. Due to the timing of Tbilisi, Schultz was not able to compete in the high school tournaments that were required to qualify for the California State Championships, but his coach Ed Hart successfully petitioned the state coaches association to allow him to compete. Wrestling at 170 lbs, a weight class above his normal weight, Schultz pinned all his opponents in the state championships but the last, whom he defeated 12–1 in the final match. Later that year he won his first national title by winning the U.S. National Open Greco-Roman Championships and won the award for most falls in the least amount of time. Schultz's senior year is considered by most experts as the most successful senior year in U.S. high school wrestling history.

=== College ===
In college, Schultz was a three-time NCAA All-American, first at Oklahoma State University and then twice at the University of Oklahoma. In 1982, he was the 167-pound weight class NCAA Champion defeating Mike Sheets from Oklahoma State University in the finals by criteria tie-breaker in overtime. His career collegiate record was 91–8: 30–4 at Oklahoma State University and 61–4 at the University of Oklahoma.

=== World and Olympics career ===
Schultz won ten Senior National titles (eight in Freestyle and two in Greco-Roman) over a 19-year span, at three weight divisions: 149.9 lb, 163 lb and 180.5 lb. In international competition, Schultz won a 1983 World Championship and a 1984 Olympic gold medal, competing with the United States team. Schultz won the gold medal at the 74 kg weight class over Martin Knosp from West Germany. He won four World Cup and two Pan American Games titles, and is the only American ever to twice win the tournament in Tbilisi, Georgia. In all, he was a seven-time World and Olympic medalist. Together, Dave and his brother Mark Schultz, along with the Banach brothers, were the first American brothers to each win gold medals in the same Olympics. The Schultz brothers are the only American brothers to win both World and Olympic championships.

=== Coaching and post professional career ===
At various times, Schultz also served as an assistant coach at the University of Oklahoma, Stanford University, and the University of Wisconsin–Madison where he coached Dave Lee and Jim Jordan to NCAA titles. Among many other top U.S. wrestlers, Schultz trained 1996 Olympic Gold Medalist Kurt Angle, who later became a professional wrestler. In the 1990s, he worked as a coach for John du Pont's "Team Foxcatcher", which trained at a complex built on the du Pont family farm in Newtown Square, Pennsylvania. In 1996, Schultz was murdered there by John du Pont.

== Murder ==
Schultz trained at the Foxcatcher center while preparing for another Olympic bid, as well as coaching the wrestling team. On January 26, 1996, he was shot and killed by John du Pont, the owner of the center. Du Pont had exhibited bizarre and threatening behavior for an extended period preceding the murder.

Dave Schultz was 36 at the time of his death. His body was cremated. Schultz's surviving family included his wife Nancy, his son Alexander, his daughter Danielle, his siblings, and both parents. His wife, Nancy, later founded the Dave Schultz Wrestling Club, which supported 20 displaced athletes from Team Foxcatcher, providing them with training and coaching resources through the 1996 Olympics. In recognition of her contributions, she received the Lifetime Service to Wrestling award from the California Chapter of the National Wrestling Hall of Fame in 2013 and the Hall of Fame's Order of Merit award in 2018.

At the trial, neither the prosecution nor the defense suggested a motive for the crime. A jury rejected du Pont's plea of not guilty by reason of insanity; he was convicted as guilty but mentally ill. Du Pont was sentenced by Judge Patricia Jenkins to 13–30 years incarceration and died in prison on December 9, 2010. Schultz's father Philip told The New York Times that "the fact that he's officially gone is almost a moot point. I did forgive the man for what he did. I never forgave the act."

The story of the events leading to his death are portrayed in the 2014 film Foxcatcher, with Schultz portrayed by Mark Ruffalo.

== Legacy ==
After Schultz's murder, 20 former Foxcatcher athletes were left without training or coaching resources six months before the 1996 Olympic Games. Schultz's widow founded the Dave Schultz Wrestling Club in March 1996 to sponsor the stranded wrestlers through the Olympics. The Club succeeded beyond the initial goal. It continued to train athletes in both men's and women's freestyle and Greco-Roman wrestling until it closed in 2005. Among the wrestlers who competed under Dave Schultz WC sponsorship were Olympic gold medalists Kurt Angle (100 kg/220 lbs Men's Freestyle, 1996) and Brandon Slay (76 kg/167.5 lbs Men's Freestyle, 2000), Olympic bronze medalist Patricia Miranda (48 kg/105.5 lbs Women's Freestyle, 2004), and World Champion Stephen Neal (130 kg/286 lbs. Men's Freestyle, 1999).

- Since Schultz's death, USA Wrestling has hosted the annual Dave Schultz Memorial International wrestling meet at the United States Olympic Training Center in Colorado Springs, Colorado.
- In 1997, Schultz was posthumously inducted into the National Wrestling Hall of Fame as a Distinguished Member.
- The singlet Kurt Angle wore in his early World Wrestling Federation career was a tribute to Schultz.
- In 1996, the National Wrestling Hall of Fame established the Dave Schultz High School Excellence Award, which celebrates an outstanding high school male wrestler from each state, while also signifying regional and a national winner. The award is equally based on wrestling success, scholastic achievement, and community service.
- In 2016, United World Wrestling posthumously inducted Schultz into its Hall of Fame.

== Representation in other media ==
- The 2014 film Foxcatcher, directed by Bennett Miller, with Mark Ruffalo playing Schultz, Steve Carell as du Pont and Channing Tatum as Mark, is based on Mark Schultz's relationship with du Pont. For his portrayal of Dave, Ruffalo was nominated for the Academy Award for Best Supporting Actor.
- Dave's brother Mark Schultz wrote a non-fiction New York Times best seller, Foxcatcher: The True Story of My Brother's Murder, John du Pont's Madness, and the Quest for Olympic Gold (2014).
- The story of John du Pont, David Schultz, and Team Foxcatcher is documented in The Prince of Pennsylvania, a documentary film directed by Jesse Vile for ESPN's 30 for 30 series.
- The 2016 documentary film Team Foxcatcher was produced with cooperation from the Schultz family, and features archival footage and interviews with many of those present at the time of the events at Foxcatcher Farm.

== Athletic achievements ==
- 1982 NCAA Division I Champion, 167 lb class
- 1983 Senior Freestyle world champion, 163 lb
- 1984 Olympic gold medalist, 163.1 lb
- 1986 Goodwill Games gold medalist
- 1994 Goodwill Games silver medalist
- Seven-time USA Senior Freestyle champion (1984, 1986, 1987, 1988, 1993, 1994, 1995; all except 1988 (180.5 lb) at 163 lb)
- Five-time World Cup champion (1980, 1982, 1985, 1994, 1995)
- Two-time Pan American Games champion (1977 (Greco-Roman), 1987(Freestyle))
- Three-time AAU National Champion (1977 GR, 1981 FS, 1982 GR)
- Three-time NCAA Division I all-American (1978, 1981, 1982)
- Two-Time Tbilisi Champion (1984, 1991)
- Two-time Olympic Festival Champion (1985, 1987)
- Two-time Sunkist International Champion (1989, 1990)
- Three-time DeGlane Challenge Champion (1983, 1990, 1991)
- Three-time World silver medalist, 163 lb (1985, 1987, 1993)
- Two-time World Bronze medalist (1982, 1986)

== See also ==
- List of World and Olympic Champions in men's freestyle wrestling
- United States results in men's freestyle wrestling
- List of Jews in Sports
