= Nate Carr =

American wrestler (born 1960)

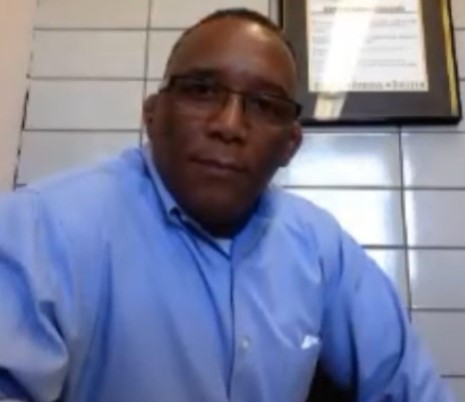
- Carr in 2015

Personal information
- Born: June 24, 1960 (age 66) Erie, Pennsylvania, U.S.
- Children: David Carr

Sport
- Country: United States
- Sport: Wrestling
- Events: Freestyle and Folkstyle
- College team: Iowa State
- Club: Sunkist Kids Wrestling Club
- Team: USA
- Coached by: Harold Nichols
Medal record
Men's freestyle wrestling
Representing the United States
Olympic Games
Bronze medal – third place	1988 Seoul	68 kg
Goodwill Games
Gold medal – first place	1990 Seattle	68 kg
World Cup
Gold medal – first place	1986 Toledo	68 kg
Pan American Championships
Gold medal – first place	1986 Colorado Springs	68 kg
Collegiate Wrestling
Representing the Iowa State Cyclones
NCAA Division I Championships
Gold medal – first place	1981 Princeton	150 lb
Gold medal – first place	1982 Ames	150 lb
Gold medal – first place	1983 Oklahoma City	150 lb

Nate Carr (born June 24, 1960) is an American former collegiate and international senior level freestyle wrestler. He grew up in a family of 16 children in Erie, Pennsylvania. Five of these, including Nate, would become All-American wrestlers (an NCAA record) and two, again including Nate, would compete in the Olympic Games. In 2003, Carr was inducted into the National Wrestling Hall of Fame as a Distinguished Member.

== High school ==
During his high school career at Erie Tech High School, Carr was coached by Tom Carr (no relation) and posted a record of 115-7, winning a Pennsylvania Class AAA state championship.

== College ==
Upon his graduation from Erie Tech, Carr received a wrestling scholarship to Iowa State University. There he had a career record of 117-20-1 in the 150 pound weight class. He earned three NCAA wrestling championships and two Big Eight Conference Titles.

== Senior level ==
After graduation from Iowa State, Carr continued his freestyle wrestling career at the international level. In 1983 Carr earned a spot on the US World Team. In 1986 he won both the World Cup and the Pan-American Championships.

He began training for the 1988 Olympic Games in Seoul while working as an assistant coach at West Virginia University. While staying in the Olympic Village, Carr did not participate in any of the recreational activities offered to the athletes because he felt it would interfere with his focus toward winning gold. At the 1988 Olympics, Carr lost in the semifinal match and wrestled back to earn the bronze medal. There have been accusations of a scoring error by a judge during his semifinal match, which may have adversely affected his placement.

He returned as a member of the US World Team in 1990 and also won his weight class at the Goodwill Games.

== Subsequent career and family ==
Carr continued his participation in the sport as an assistant coach at West Virginia University. After his retirement from WVU, he moved to Jones County, Georgia. There, his son, Nate Carr, Jr. was a nationally ranked high school wrestler and three-time state champion. Nate, Jr. originally committed to West Virginia University, but instead opted to attend Iowa Central Community College, where he won the NJCAA 157 lb. National Title. Nate Carr currently works as the head club coach for the Regional Training Center at Iowa State University, where his youngest son David was a member of the Iowa State Cyclones wrestling team. David became a two-time NCAA Champion for Iowa State, winning titles in 2021 as a Freshman and closing out his collegiate career with another title as a Senior in 2024.
