= Jim Scherr =

American wrestler (born 1961)

Personal information
- Full name: James Edwin Scherr
- Born: July 27, 1961 (age 64) Eureka, South Dakota, U.S.
- Height: 6 ft 0 in (183 cm)
- Weight: 209 lb (95 kg)

Sport
- Country: United States
- Sport: Wrestling
- Events: Freestyle and Folkstyle
- College team: Nebraska
- Club: Sunkist Kids Wrestling Club
- Team: USA
Medal record
Men's freestyle wrestling
Representing the United States
World Championships
Silver medal – second place	1987 Clermont-Ferrand	90 kg
Silver medal – second place	1989 Switzerland	90 kg
Bronze medal – third place	1986 Budapest	90 kg
Pan American Games
Bronze medal – third place	1987 Indianapolis	90 kg
Pan American Championships
Gold medal – first place	1989 Colorado Springs	90 kg
Bronze medal – third place	1987 Indianapolis	90 kg
Collegiate Wrestling
Representing the Nebraska Cornhuskers
NCAA Division I Championships
Gold medal – first place	1984 East Rutherford	177 lb

James Edwin Scherr (born July 27, 1961) is a former American wrestler and former U.S. Olympic Committee CEO. He placed in three world wrestling championships taking bronze at 90 kg at the 1986 World Wrestling Championships, followed by a silver medal at the 1987 World Championship. He then competed in the men's freestyle 90 kg at the 1988 Summer Olympics. He repeated as silver medalist at 90 kg at the 1989 World Championships. His twin brother Bill Scherr was also an Olympian.

In 2002, he was inducted in the National Wrestling Hall of Fame as a Distinguished Member.
