= Andre Metzger =

American wrestler (born 1960)

Personal information
- Born: 1960 (age 65–66) Texas, U.S.
- Home town: Cedar Springs, Michigan, U.S.
- Weight: 68 kg (150 lb)

Sport
- Country: United States
- Sport: Wrestling
- Event(s): Greco-Roman, Freestyle, and Folkstyle
- College team: Oklahoma
- Team: USA
Medal record
Men's freestyle wrestling
Representing the United States
World Championships
Silver medal – second place	1986 Budapest	68 kg
Bronze medal – third place	1979 San Diego	62 kg
Bronze medal – third place	1987 Clermont-Ferrand	68 kg
Pan American Games
Gold medal – first place	1979 San Juan	62 kg
Gold medal – first place	1987 Indianapolis	68 kg
World Cup
Silver medal – second place	1986 Toledo	68 kg
Silver medal – second place	1988 Toledo	68 kg
Bronze medal – third place	1980 Toledo	62 kg
Bronze medal – third place	1981 Toledo	62 kg
Collegiate Wrestling
Representing the Oklahoma Sooners
NCAA Division I Championships
Gold medal – first place	1981 Princeton	142 lb
Gold medal – first place	1982 Ames	142 lb
Silver medal – second place	1980 Corvallis	142 lb

Andre Metzger (born 1960) is an American former wrestler. He competed at 62 and 68 kilograms in freestyle wrestling, where he racked up numerous medals from the World Championships and the World Cup, as well as championships from the Pan American Games. In college, Metzger was a two-time NCAA Division I National champion and a four-time All-American at the University of Oklahoma.

== Career ==
Having started wrestling as a high school freshman, Metzger was a state champion out of Cedar Springs High School in Cedar Springs, Michigan and was successful in folkstyle, freestyle, and Greco-Roman styles. From 1979 to 1982, he became a two-time NCAA Division I National champion and a four-time All-American while at the University of Oklahoma, and in 1980, Metzger almost made the US Olympic Team before injuring his ankle and forfeiting his match to the eventual tournament winner, fellow NCAA champion Steve Barrett, where he was leading. During his senior level freestyle career, Metzger racked up numerous medals from the World Championships, the World Cup, and championships from the Pan American Games.

He made a return in 2012 as a Greco-Roman wrestler, falling one match short from placing at the US Olympic Team Trials despite being 52 years of age.

In 2017, Metzger was inducted into the National Wrestling Hall of Fame as a Distinguished Member.
