= Kenny Monday =

American wrestler (born 1961)

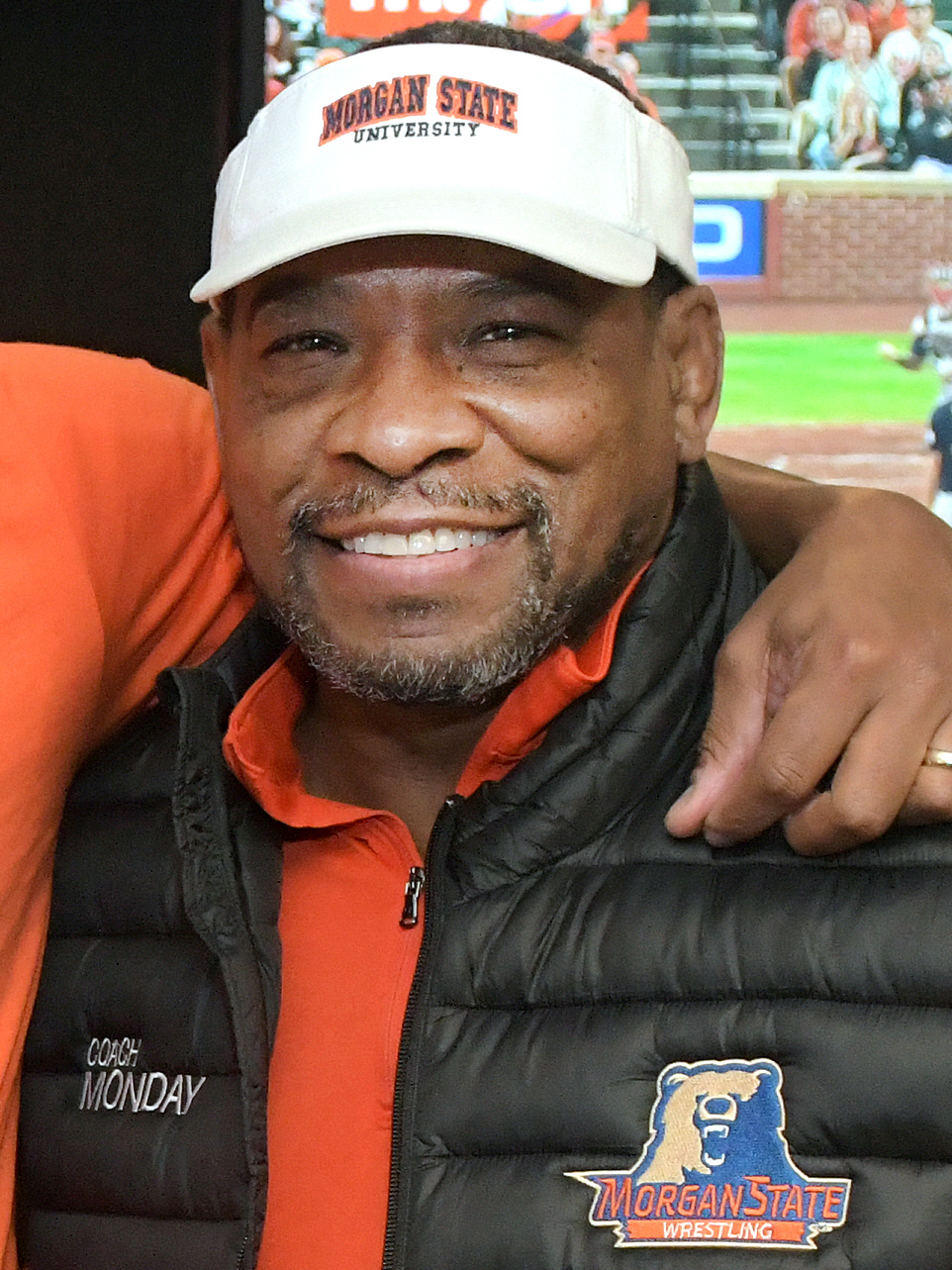
- Monday in 2023

Personal information
- Born: November 25, 1961 (age 64) Tulsa, Oklahoma, U.S.
- Height: 5 ft 10 in (178 cm)
- Weight: 74 kg (163 lb)

Sport
- Country: United States
- Sport: Wrestling
- Events: Freestyle and Folkstyle
- College team: Oklahoma State
- Club: Sunkist Kids Wrestling Club
- Team: USA
- Now coaching: Morgan State University
Medal record
Men's freestyle wrestling
Representing the United States
Olympic Games
Gold medal – first place	1988 Seoul	74 kg
Silver medal – second place	1992 Barcelona	74 kg
World Championships
Gold medal – first place	1989 Martigny	74 kg
Silver medal – second place	1991 Varna	74 kg
Pan American Games
Gold medal – first place	1991 Havana	74 kg
Collegiate Wrestling
Representing the Oklahoma State Cowboys
NCAA Division I Championships
Gold medal – first place	1984 East Rutherford	150 lb
Silver medal – second place	1983 Oklahoma City	150 lb
Silver medal – second place	1982 Ames	150 lb
Big 8 Championships
Gold medal – first place	1982 Lincoln	150 lb
Gold medal – first place	1983 Ames	150 lb
Silver medal – second place	1984 Stillwater	150 lb
Bronze medal – third place	1981 Stillwater	142 lb

Kenny Dale Monday (born November 25, 1961) is an American former folkstyle and freestyle wrestler who is the current head coach of Morgan State's wrestling team. As a wrestler, he was an Olympic gold medalist and three-time All-American from Oklahoma State University. Monday is a three-time Olympian.

He began wrestling at age six at a YMCA after-school program and grew up idolizing Olympic wrestler Wayne Wells. He attended Booker T. Washington High School in Tulsa, Oklahoma, where he won four state titles and the 1977 Junior National championship. He never lost a match from seventh grade through the end of high school and finished with a record of 140–0–1.

As an All-American at OSU, Monday won the NCAA title in 1984 at 150 pounds. His collegiate record of 121–12–2 contributed to the Cowboys winning two Big Eight titles. He won the 1989 World Championship and a series of USA Freestyle championships in 1985, 1988, 1991, and 1996. He won the Olympic Championship in 1988 in a 5–2 overtime win against the Soviet Union's Adlan Varaev. Monday was voted the outstanding wrestler of the Grand Masters of Olympic Wrestling in 1990, after beating Rahmat Sofiadi of Bulgaria.

Monday was a silver medalist in the 1992 Olympics and placed sixth in the 1996 Atlanta Summer Olympics. In 2001, Monday was inducted into the National Wrestling Hall of Fame as a Distinguished Member.

On March 28, 1997, Monday competed in a mixed martial arts bout defeating John Lewis by TKO in round two at Extreme Fighting 4, which was held in Des Moines, Iowa.

Monday has also worked as the wrestling coach with the Blackzilians, a mixed martial arts camp based in Boca Raton, Florida. He is married to Sabrina Goodwin Monday (National Sales Director for Mary Kay Cosmetics) and has three children. Both his sons would become NCAA Division I wrestlers. His oldest son Kennedy wrestled for the University of North Carolina, and his younger son Quincy currently wrestles for Princeton University. Monday currently resides in North Carolina.

On August 15, 2022, Monday was announced as the head wrestling coach of the resurrected Morgan State University program, that last competed in 1997. In 2026, the revived program's third year on the mat, Eugene Harney and Yannis Charles qualified for the NCAA Tournament. Harney won the EIWA title at 149 pounds while Charles qualified at 157 pounds despite a medical forfeit during the conference tournament. Of the twelve teams in the EIWA, Morgan State finished eighth. The team finished T51 at the 2026 NCAA tournament.

== Mixed martial arts record ==
Professional record breakdown
1 match	1 win	0 losses
By knockout	1	0

Res.	Record	Opponent	Method	Event	Date	Round	Time	Location	Notes
Win	1–0	John Lewis	TKO (punches)	Extreme fighting 4	March 28, 1997	2	4:23	Des Moines, Iowa, USA	

== Submission grappling record ==
Result	Opponent	Method	Event	Date	Round	Time	Notes
Loss	(United States) Matt Hume	Submission (toe hold)	The Contenders	October 11, 1997	1	0:45	

== See also ==
- List of Oklahoma State University Olympians
