= Werner Holzer =

American wrestler (1937–2018)

Personal information
- Born: September 23, 1937 Chicago, Illinois, U.S.
- Died: October 29, 2018 (aged 81) Fallbrook, California, U.S.

Sport
- Country: United States
- Sport: Wrestling
- Events: Greco-Roman, Freestyle and Folkstyle
- College team: Illinois
- Club: Mayor Daley Youth Foundation
- Team: USA
Medal record
Collegiate Wrestling
Representing the Illinois Fighting Illini
NCAA Championships
Bronze medal – third place	1957 Pittsburgh	147 lb

Werner Holzer (September 23, 1937 – October 29, 2018) was an American wrestler. He competed in the men's Greco-Roman 70 kg at the 1968 Summer Olympics. He also was a two-time U.S. freestyle World Team member and competed at the 1966 and 1967 World Championships. In college, Holzer wrestled at the University of Illinois Urbana-Champaign, where he was an NCAA wrestling All-American.

Holzer would later play a key role in establishing the U.S. Wrestling Federation, serving as the first President, and helped launch kids, junior and adult wrestling programs across the state of Illinois. In 1993, he was inducted into the National Wrestling Hall of Fame as a Distinguished Member.
