= Bobby Weaver =

American Olympic wrestler (born 1958)

Personal information
- Born: December 29, 1958 (age 67) Rochester, New York, U.S.
- Home town: Easton, Pennsylvania, U.S.

Sport
- Country: United States
- Sport: Wrestling
- Events: Freestyle and Folkstyle
- College team: Lehigh
- Team: USA
Medal record
Men's freestyle wrestling
Representing United States
Olympic Games
Gold medal – first place	1984 Los Angeles	48 kg
World Championships
Silver medal – second place	1979 San Diego	48 kg
Collegiate Wrestling
Representing the Lehigh Mountain Hawks
NCAA Division I Championships
Bronze medal – third place	1982 Ames	118 lb

Robert Brooks Weaver Sr. (born December 29, 1958) is an American former freestyle wrestler. He won a gold medal at 48 kg (105.5 pounds) at the 1984 Summer Olympics in Los Angeles. He also won a silver medal at the 1979 World Championships and was a member of the 1980 Olympic team that boycotted the Moscow Olympics.

== Early life and education ==
Weaver was born in Rochester, New York, on December 29, 1958. He began wrestling at the age of six, and attended Easton Area High School in Easton, Pennsylvania, where he won three PIAA state titles. He won in 1975 and 1976 at the 98-pound weight class and in 1977 at the 105-pound weight class. In 1977, Weaver participated in the Dapper Dan Classic, which features the Pennsylvania all-stars against a national team and won by a fall in 0:50. He graduated from Easton High School in 1977 and spent a post-graduate year at Blair Academy in Blairstown, New Jersey. While at Blair, he won the National Prep School Championship and the Outstanding Wrestler trophy.

=== College ===
Weaver matriculated at Lehigh University in Bethlehem, Pennsylvania, in the fall of 1978. Competing in college was a challenge for Weaver since the lightest NCAA weight class was 118 pounds, which was above his freestyle weight class of 105.5 pounds. He red shirted as a freshman at Lehigh and saw little action the following season. However, he was a starter for Lehigh the next three seasons at the 118 pound class and won conference titles in 1982 and 1983 and finished third in the 1982 NCAA Division I tournament. He finished his career at Lehigh with a record of 57-14-3 with 16 falls.

=== Freestyle ===
Weaver began competing in freestyle wrestling while still in high school. He caused a sensation at the 1976 Olympic trials when he pinned his first eight opponents. He eventually ended up as the alternate on the Olympic team. Then, just two years out of high school, Weaver finished second at the 1979 world championships in San Diego, California. Prior to winning the gold medal at the 1984 Summer Olympics in Los Angeles, Weaver won six national freestyle championships, two FILA World Cup gold medals, two World Cup silver medals, gold medals in tournaments in Germany, Poland and Cuba and a silver medal at the demand freestyle tournament in Tbilisi.

Weaver was a flamboyant winner, especially when he won by pin. He was known to jump up and down and do backward somersaults in the air, particularly when he pinned 1976 Olympian William Rosado for the 1980 team berth and when he pinned Takashi Irie in the 1984 Olympic finals. Following his gold medal win in 1984, he circled the arena several times with his young son, Bobby Jr., in his arms.

Weaver was inducted into the National Wrestling Hall of Fame in 2008 as a Distinguished Member. He missed the ceremonies because of a serious illness, but was able to attend the following year.

== Bibliography ==
- Diehl, Denny. 1997. Mat Power: Lehigh Wrestling Highlights. Roby Publishing. ISBN 978-0-9656588-0-5
- Moffat, James V. 2007. Wrestlers At The Trials. Exit Zero Publishing. ISBN 978-0-9799051-0-0
