= Dominic Black =

American wrestler (born 1969)

Personal information
- Born: October 22, 1969 (age 56) Lexington, Kentucky, U.S.

Sport
- Country: United States
- Sport: Wrestling
- Events: Freestyle and Folkstyle
- College team: West Virginia
- Club: U.S. Army WCAP
- Team: USA
Medal record
Men's freestyle wrestling
Representing the United States
World Military Championships
Gold medal – first place	2003 Istanbul	120 kg
Pan American Games
Gold medal – first place	1999 Winnipeg	97 kg
Pan American Championships
Silver medal – second place	1993 Guatemala City	90 kg
Silver medal – second place	2000 Cali	97 kg

Dominic Black (born October 22, 1969) is an American former freestyle and folkstyle wrestler.

== Early life ==
Black began wrestling as a sophomore at Henry Clay High School in Lexington, Kentucky. He barely posted a winning record during his first year and didn't qualify for the state tournament. Black's record improved significantly his junior year, as he finished third in the state. His senior year he won the state championship at his weight class and also won the 1987 Kentucky High School Athletic Association (KHSAA) Most Outstanding Wrestler award.

== College ==
Black wrestled collegiately at West Virginia University, where he finished his career as one of only five WVU wrestlers in team history at the time to have more than 100 career wins, with a 105–36–2 record. As a junior, he went 33–5, won an EWL title, and competed in his second straight NCAA tournament. In his senior season in 1991, he recorded 39 wins, another EWL title and earned NCAA All-American honors with a fourth-place finish at the national tournament.

== International ==
In 1992, Black took first place at University Freestyle Nationals. In 1995, he was the first WVU wrestler to represent the United States at an international event and earn gold, winning a gold medal at the World Cup of Freestyle.

In 1997, Black entered the United States Army and was a member of the Army's World Class Athlete Program, that allows him to wrestle and recruit for the Army. In 1999, Black won a gold medal at the Pan-American games at 97 kg and was the U.S. freestyle national champion, earning him a spot on the U.S. freestyle World Team and competing at the 1999 World Wrestling Championships. He would qualify for the 2000 U.S. Olympic Trials, were finished as runner-up at 97 kg. Black also represented the United States at the 2001 World Wrestling Championships.

In 2004, Black was inducted into the West Virginia University Athletics Hall of Fame.
