= 1983 NCAA Division I Wrestling Championships =

American collegiate wrestling tournament

Tournament information
- Sport: College wrestling
- Location: Oklahoma City, Oklahoma
- Dates: March 10, 1983–March 12, 1983
- Host(s): University of Oklahoma; Oklahoma State University
- Venue(s): Myriad Convention Center

Final positions
- Champions: Iowa (8th title)
- 1st runners-up: Oklahoma State
- 2nd runners-up: Iowa State

Tournament statistics
- Attendance: 63,263
- MVP: Mike Sheets (Oklahoma State)

The 1983 NCAA Division I Wrestling Championships were the 53rd NCAA Division I Wrestling Championships to be held. The University of Oklahoma and Oklahoma State University co-hosted the tournament. The tournament was held at the Myriad Convention Center in downtown Oklahoma City.

Iowa took home the team championship with 155 points and having four individual champions.

Mike Sheets of Oklahoma State was named the Most Outstanding Wrestler and Lou Banach of Iowa received the Gorriaran Award.

== Team results ==
Rank	School	Points
1	Iowa	155
2	Oklahoma State	102
3	Iowa State	94.25
4	Oklahoma	64.75
5	Lehigh	49
6	Nebraska	46
7	Penn State	33.75
8	Louisiana State	30.5
9	Cal Poly-SLO	28.5
10	Northern Iowa	26.5

== Individual finals ==
Weight class	Championship match (champion in boldface)
118 lbs	**Adam Cuestas**, Cal State-Bakersfield MAJOR Charlie Heard, Tennessee-Chattanooga, 14–4
126 lbs	**Barry Davis**, Iowa DEC Gary Bohay, Arizona State, 5–2
134 lbs	**Clar Anderson**, Oklahoma State DEC Clint Burke, Oklahoma, 5–3
142 lbs	**Darryl Burley**, Lehigh WDF Al Freeman, Nebraska
150 lbs	**Nate Carr**, Iowa State DEC Kenny Monday, Oklahoma State, 3–3, 5–2
158 lbs	**Jim Zalesky**, Iowa DEC Lou Montano, Cal Poly-SLO, 7–4
167 lbs	**Mike Sheets**, Oklahoma State MAJOR John Reich, Navy, 14–0
177 lbs	**Mark Schultz**, Oklahoma DEC Duane Goldman, Iowa, 4–2
190 lbs	**Ed Banach**, Iowa DEC Mike Mann, Iowa State, 4–3
UNL	**Lou Banach**, Iowa WBF Wayne Cole, Iowa State, 2:57
