= Bruce Baumgartner =

American freestyle wrestler (born 1960)

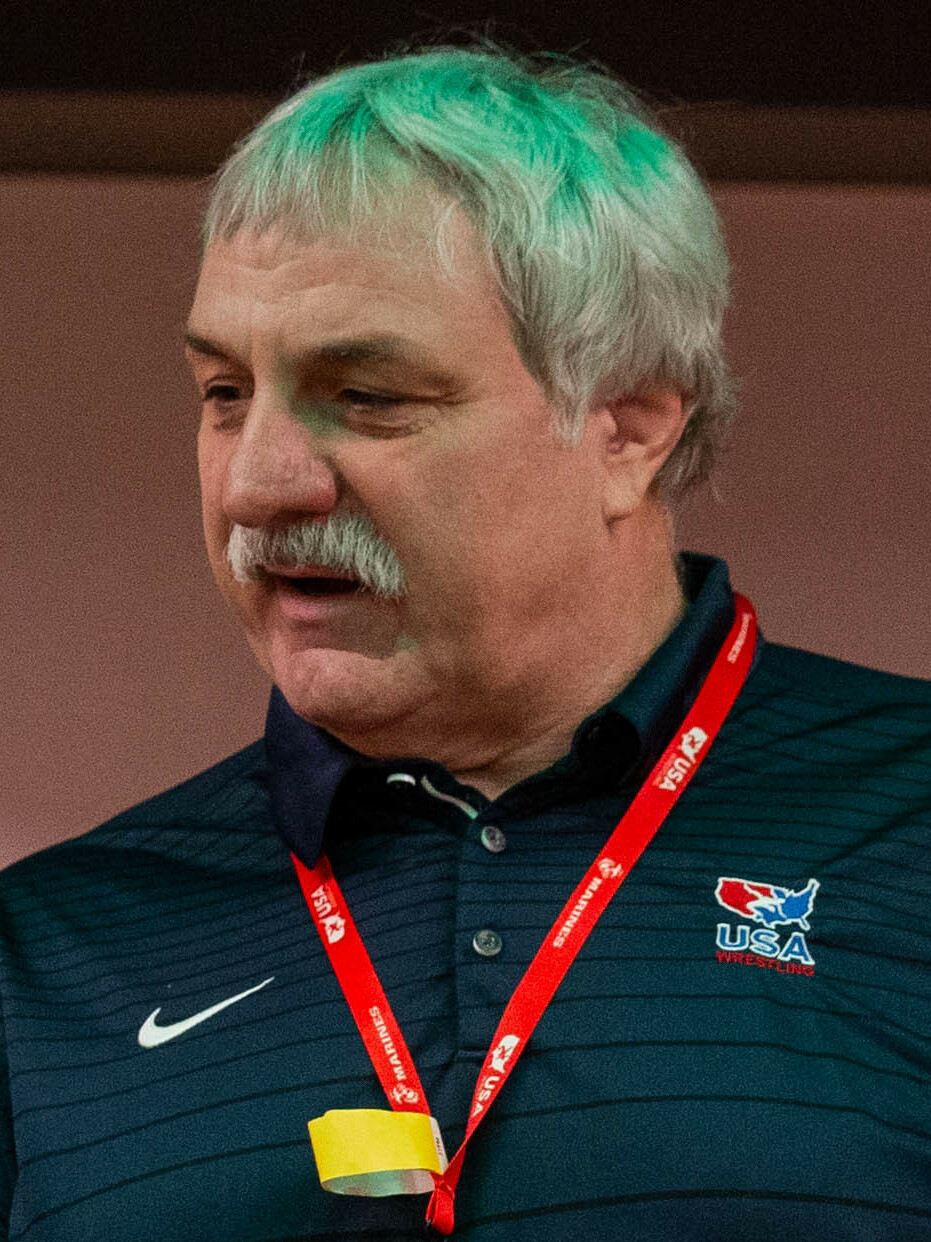
- Baumgartner in 2022

Personal information
- Full name: Bruce Robert Baumgartner
- Born: November 2, 1960 (age 65) Haledon, New Jersey, U.S.
- Height: 6 ft 2 in (188 cm)
- Weight: 130 kg (287 lb)

Sport
- Country: United States
- Sport: Wrestling
- Events: Freestyle and Folkstyle
- College team: Indiana State
- Club: New York Athletic Club
- Team: USA
Medal record
Men's freestyle wrestling
Representing the United States
Olympic Games
Gold medal – first place	1984 Los Angeles	+100 kg
Gold medal – first place	1992 Barcelona	130 kg
Silver medal – second place	1988 Seoul	130 kg
Bronze medal – third place	1996 Atlanta	130 kg
World Championships
Gold medal – first place	1986 Budapest	130 kg
Gold medal – first place	1993 Toronto	130 kg
Gold medal – first place	1995 Atlanta	130 kg
Silver medal – second place	1989 Martigny	130 kg
Silver medal – second place	1990 Tokyo	130 kg
Silver medal – second place	1994 Istanbul	130 kg
Bronze medal – third place	1983 Kiev	+100 kg
Bronze medal – third place	1985 Budapest	130 kg
Bronze medal – third place	1987 Clermont-Ferrand	130 kg
Goodwill Games
Gold medal – first place	1986 Moscow	+100 kg
Summer Universiade
Gold medal – first place	1981 Bucharest	+100 kg
Pan American Games
Gold medal – first place	1987 Indianapolis	130 kg
Gold medal – first place	1991 Havana	130 kg
Gold medal – first place	1995 Mar de Plata	130 kg
Silver medal – second place	1983 Caracas	130 kg
Pan American Championships
Gold medal – first place	1987 Indianapolis	130 kg
Gold medal – first place	1988 Mexico City	130 kg
Gold medal – first place	1989 Colorado Springs	130 kg
Collegiate Wrestling
Representing the Indiana State Sycamores
NCAA Division I Championships
Gold medal – first place	1982 Ames	Heavyweight
Silver medal – second place	1981 Princeton	Heavyweight
Silver medal – second place	1980 Corvallis	Heavyweight

Bruce Robert Baumgartner (born November 2, 1960) is an American former freestyle wrestler. He is the current assistant vice president for university advancement and former athletic director at the Edinboro University of Pennsylvania near Erie, Pennsylvania and current President of USA Wrestling.

Baumgartner is among the best American wrestlers of all time; his five World/Olympic titles place him behind only Jordan Burroughs, John Smith, and Adeline Gray. Between 1983 and 1996, Baumgartner won 13 World or Olympic medals, the most World and Olympic medals among American wrestlers. His 13 medals at the world level are tied for the most in men’s wrestling history, alongside Russian wrestler Aleksandr Karelin.

== Life and career ==
Baumgartner was born in Haledon, New Jersey. He is one of the most accomplished American wrestlers of all time, winning 4 Olympic medals (2-Gold, 1-Silver, 1-Bronze), 9 World Championship medals (3-Gold, 3-Silver, 3-Bronze) and 4 Pan-American medals (3-Gold, 1-Silver); he has also won 12 World Cup medals (7-Gold, 5-Silver), an NCAA title (and 2 Runner-Up finishes), 4 Olympic Festival titles, 2 AAU National titles and a Junior National title. Baumgartner holds the joint-record for most medals at the world-level in men's wrestling, with 13, which is tied with Russian wrestler Aleksandr Karelin and Cuban wrestler Mijaín López.

Baumgartner attended Manchester Regional High School in Haledon, New Jersey. During high school, Baumgartner excelled on the wrestling team, going 23–0, but was defeated in the New Jersey State Championship match. During the off-season he threw shot put and discus on the track team, setting several records in the shot put. Baumgartner is a four-time Olympian and owns four Olympic Medals: two gold, one silver and one bronze. He holds a Bachelor's degree in education from Indiana State University in Terre Haute, Indiana, where he competed collegiately for 4 years. He frequently worked out alongside Kurt Thomas, an Olympic Gymnast. During his collegiate career he finished runner-up at Nationals his sophomore and junior years, and was the 1982 NCAA Division I National Champion his senior year, completing an undefeated season of 44–0. His collegiate record was 134–12 with 73 falls. In 1995, he was presented the James E. Sullivan Award by the Amateur Athletic Union as the outstanding amateur athlete in the U.S. He was sponsored through the New York Athletic Club.

Baumgartner ranked as one of the top super-heavyweight freestyle wrestlers for more than a decade. He won his first World medal, a bronze, in 1983. The following year, he won an Olympic gold medal at the 1984 Olympics in Los Angeles. He confirmed his status with the Communist Bloc (Eastern European) wrestlers by winning his first World Championship in 1986, clinching his first of his three World titles.

In his second Olympic final at the 1988 Olympics in Seoul, he took silver, behind Georgian David Gobejishvili. Four years later, he won the rematch at the 1992 Olympics in Barcelona, en route to his second Olympic gold medal. After winning World titles in 1993 and 1995, Baumgartner was favored to win his third Olympic gold at the 1996 Olympics in Atlanta, but a loss to Russian Andrey Shumilin left him with a bronze medal.

== Championships ==
In addition to his three World Championships and two Olympic gold medals, Baumgartner amassed three golds at the Pan American Games, seventeen American titles and eight World Cup wins. He also won an NCAA National Championship, had two NCAA Runner-Up finishes, two AAU National Titles, and a Junior National title.

In 1998, Baumgartner was inducted into the Indiana State University Athletic Hall of Fame; in 2003, the Missouri Valley Conference named him an 'Institutional Great' and inducted him into the Missouri Valley Conference Hall of Fame.

In 2008, Baumgartner was inducted into the U.S. Olympic Hall of Fame. He was inducted into the National Wrestling Hall of Fame as a Distinguished Member in 2002, and the International Wrestling Federation Hall of Fame in 2003.

== See also ==
- List of multiple Summer Olympic medalists

Olympic Games
Preceded by Cammy Myler	Flagbearer for United States; Atlanta 1996	Succeeded by Eric Flaim
