= 1982 NCAA Division I Wrestling Championships =

American collegiate wrestling tournament

Tournament information
- Sport: College wrestling
- Location: Ames, Iowa
- Dates: March 11, 1982–March 13, 1982
- Host(s): Iowa State University
- Venue(s): Hilton Coliseum

Final positions
- Champions: Iowa (7th title)
- 1st runners-up: Iowa State
- 2nd runners-up: Oklahoma

Tournament statistics
- Attendance: 66,307
- MVP: Mark Schultz (Oklahoma)

The 1982 NCAA Division I Wrestling Championships were the 52nd NCAA Division I Wrestling Championships to be held. Iowa State University in Ames, Iowa hosted the tournament at Hilton Coliseum.

Iowa took home the team championship with 131.75 points and having three individual champions.

Mark Schultz of Oklahoma was named the Most Outstanding Wrestler and Gary Albright of Nebraska received the Gorriaran Award.

== Team results ==
Rank	School	Points
1	Iowa	131.75
2	Iowa State	111
3	Oklahoma	109
4	Oklahoma State	71.75
5	North Carolina	47
6	Nebraska	40.25
7	Indiana State	33
8	Lehigh	31.75
9	San Jose State	26.75
10	Northern Iowa	26

== Individual finals ==
Weight class	Championship match (champion in boldface)
118 lbs	**Barry Davis**, Iowa DEC Kevin Darkus, Iowa State, 7–5
126 lbs	**Dan Cuestas**, Cal State-Bakersfield DEC Scott Barrett, Boise State, 10–4
134 lbs	**C.D. Mock**, North Carolina DEC Don Reese, Bloomsburg, 9–2
142 lbs	**Andre Metzger**, Oklahoma DEC Lenny Zalesky, Iowa, 9–6
150 lbs	**Nate Carr**, Iowa State DEC Kenny Monday, Oklahoma State, 3–3, 2–0
158 lbs	**Jim Zalesky**, Iowa DEC Perry Shea, Cal State-Bakersfield, 10–3
167 lbs	**Dave Schultz**, Oklahoma CR5 Mike Sheets, Oklahoma State, 4–4, 1–1
177 lbs	**Mark Schultz**, Oklahoma MAJOR Ed Banach, Iowa, 16–8
190 lbs	**Pete Bush**, Iowa CR Mike Mann, Iowa State, 3–3, 2–2
UNL	**Bruce Baumgartner**, Indiana State DEC Steve Williams, Oklahoma, 4–2
