= Leroy Kemp =

American freestyle wrestler (born 1956)

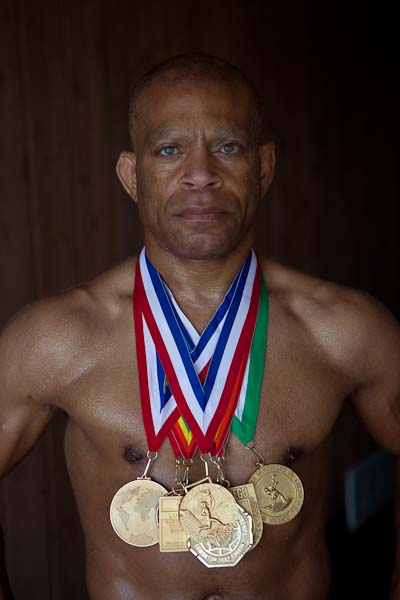
- Lee Kemp wearing his gold medals

Personal information
- Born: December 24, 1956 (age 69) Cleveland, Ohio, U.S.
- Home town: Chardon, Ohio, U.S.
- Height: 5 ft 7 in (170 cm)
- Weight: 74 kg (163 lb)

Sport
- Country: United States
- Sport: Wrestling
- Events: Freestyle and Folkstyle
- College team: Wisconsin
- Club: Wisconsin Wrestling Club
- Team: USA
Medal record
Men's freestyle wrestling
Representing the United States
World Championships
| Gold medal – first place | 1978 Mexico City | 74 kg |
| Gold medal – first place | 1979 San Diego | 74 kg |
| Gold medal – first place | 1982 Edmonton | 74 kg |
| Bronze medal – third place | 1981 Skopje | 74 kg |
Pan American Games
| Gold medal – first place | 1979 Puerto Rico | 74 kg |
| Gold medal – first place | 1983 Caracas | 74 kg |
Collegiate Wrestling
Representing the Wisconsin Badgers
NCAA Division I Championships
| Gold medal – first place | 1976 Tucson | 158 lb |
| Gold medal – first place | 1977 Norman | 158 lb |
| Gold medal – first place | 1978 College Park | 158 lb |
| Silver medal – second place | 1975 Princeton | 150 lb |

Leroy (Lee) P. Kemp, Jr. (born Darnell Freeman; December 24, 1956) is an American former freestyle and folkstyle wrestler. Kemp achieved success at the high school, collegiate, and international levels.

Kemp started wrestling in 9th grade at Chardon High School in Chardon, Ohio, and by the end of his high school career, had two undefeated seasons and won two Ohio state titles. His first state title included wins over the defending state champion and the previous years' state runner-up. Shortly after graduating from high school, Kemp was one of only four American Junior wrestlers who recorded a dual meet win against a tough Junior Soviet team on their Ohio stop of an eight city United States tour, which resulted in 80 total matches being contested. Lee also won the prestigious Junior National Freestyle Tournament in July of that same year defeating a future 3-time NCAA Champion in the finals.

While competing for the University of Wisconsin–Madison, Kemp was a four-time NCAA Division I National finalist, winning the championship three times and placing 2nd, on a split referee's decision, as a true freshman at 18 years old. Lee recorded losses to only three wrestlers in his collegiate career. His last college loss was in the NCAA finals as a freshman, posting 109 wins and no losses against collegiate competition during his last three years, which included the historic win over the legendary Dan Gable in November of Lee's sophomore year.

Kemp was America's first three-time World Champion, winning his first title in 1978 at age 21, establishing him as the youngest American world champion ever, a distinction he held for 30 years. Lee was a four-time World Cup Champion, 7-time United States Freestyle National Champion and was a heavy favorite for gold earning a berth on the 1980 United States Olympic Freestyle Wrestling Team, but was unable to compete because of the U.S. boycott of the Olympics.

Kemp was inducted into the National Wrestling Hall of Fame and Museum as a Distinguished Member in 1990. While at the Beijing Olympics in 2008, where he was one of the freestyle coaches for the U.S., he became just the fifth American to be inducted into the United World Wrestling (formerly known as FILA) Hall of Fame.

Kemp is the subject of a film documentary, entitled Wrestled Away: The Lee Kemp Story, on his life scheduled for theatrical release Summer 2019, and was the co-founder and President of LKNutrition (formerly FORZA Technologies), a nutritional supplement company. LKNutrition (formerly FORZA) was the official corporate sponsor of USA Wrestling and its national teams for four years (2008-2012)

== Early life ==
Kemp was born in Cleveland, Ohio, to a single mother, who eventually put him up for adoption. He was adopted by Leroy Percy Kemp and his wife Jessie. He was their only child, and after the adoption they legally changed his name from Darnell Freeman to Leroy P. Kemp, Jr. The Kemps lived in Cleveland until Leroy Jr. finished 6th grade, when they purchased a 25-acre (100,000 m^{2}) farm in Chardon, Ohio.

== Wrestling career ==
=== High school ===
As a freshman at Chardon high school, Kemp got involved in wrestling after being cut from the basketball team. He made the varsity as a sophomore for the 1972 season and finished with an 11-8-3 record. The next two seasons he was an Ohio State high school champion and finished undefeated in his junior and senior years. His first state title included wins over the defending state champion and the previous years' state runner-up. His career record in high school was 78-8-3. Prior to matriculating at the University of Wisconsin, Lee was one of only four American Junior wrestlers that recorded a dual meet win against a tough Junior Soviet team on their Ohio stop of an eight city United States tour (which resulted in 80 total matches being contested). Lee also won the Junior Freestyle Nationals in the summer of 1974.

=== College ===
Kemp started for Wisconsin as a true freshman and finished second at the Big Ten tournament at 150 pounds. He also reached the finals of the 1975 NCAA tournament and lost a split referees decision to Chuck Yagla of the University of Iowa. That was the last loss of Kemp's college career. Kemp's only losses in his collegiate career were to three wrestlers in his freshman year.

The following season, Kemp moved up a weight class to 158 pounds. Kemp won the NCAA title at 158 pounds the next three seasons and the only blemish on his record was a single tie finishing with 110 collegiate wins, which included the historic win over the legendary Dan Gable in November of Lee's sophomore year, while he was still 18 years old. March 10, 2010 Inside Wisconsin Sports Article,"The Day Lee Kemp Beat the Great Dan Gable", by Mike Beacom. He completed his college career with a record of 143-6-1 and 47 falls. He had a 96-match winning streak (no losses or ties) and a 110-match unbeaten streak.| National Wrestling Hall of Fame

=== Freestyle ===
Kemp, in his first major international tournament, won a gold medal at 74 kg (163 pounds) at the world freestyle championships in August 1978. At the age of 21 years and 8 months, he had become the youngest American at the time to capture a World or Olympic gold medal. He held that distinction for 30 years until Henry Cejudo won the Olympic gold medal at the 2008 Beijing Olympics.

He repeated as world champion in 1979 and 1982—becoming the first American to win three times—and added a bronze medal in 1981. He also won a gold medal at the 1979 and 1983 Pan American Games. He was the U.S. freestyle champion for six straight years from 1979 through 1983. The U.S. boycott of the Moscow Olympics prevented him from winning the ultimate prize—an Olympic gold medal. Kemp retired in 1984 after finishing second at the U.S. Olympic trials. His record in all international competition was 53–8.

Kemp was inducted into the National Wrestling Hall of Fame and Museum in 1990. At the 2008 Beijing Olympics, he was one of the freestyle coaches for the U.S., becoming just the fifth American to be inducted into the FILA International Wrestling Hall of Fame.

== Professional career ==
Kemp earned both a bachelor's and master's degree in marketing from the University of Wisconsin. He spent the first several years of his post athletic career working in the field of marketing for major corporations. In 1991, Kemp became President/Owner of Forest Lake Ford, a Ford dealership located in Forest Lake, MN near Minneapolis/St Paul. The dealership was named to the Top 100 list of minority-owned auto dealerships, by Black Enterprise, in 1995, 1996, 1997, and 2004. Kemp sold the dealership in 2005.

Kemp is the subject of a film documentary on his life released in 2019. He is also the co-founder and President of Forza Technologies, a nutritional supplement company. FORZA is the official corporate sponsor of USA Wrestling and its national teams.

Kemp remains active in wrestling on a broad scale, teaching and mentoring youth and high school level wrestlers at his wrestling academy. He has three children, two sons and a daughter. His youngest child, Adam Kemp, is also a successful wrestler.

== Other accomplishments ==
- 1975 Defeated Dan Gable 7–6 at the Northern Open
- 1978 US Wrestling Federation "Man of the Year"
- 1978 Sullivan Award Finalist
- 1979 Sullivan Award Finalist
- 1983 Inducted into the Wisconsin Wrestling Hall of Fame
- 1990 Inducted into the National Wrestling Hall of Fame as a Distinguished Member
- 1998 Named the "Wrestler of the Decade" for the 1970s by Amateur Wrestling News
- 2005 Named to the NCAA Wrestling 75th Anniversary Team
- 2008 Inducted to International Wrestling Hall of Fame
- 2009 Inducted to the Wisconsin Athletic Hall of Fame
