= Wrestling at the 1987 Pan American Games =

- Dates: August 7–23, 1987

This page shows the results of the Men's Wrestling Competition at the 1987 Pan American Games, held from August 7 to August 23, 1987, in Indianapolis, United States.

== Men's competition ==
=== Freestyle (– 48 kg) ===
RANK	NAME
Gold medal	Aldo Martínez Echevarria (CUB)
Silver medal	Tim Vanni (USA)
Bronze medal	Willian Delgado (COL)

=== Freestyle (– 52 kg) ===
RANK	NAME
Gold medal	Carlos Varela González (CUB)
Silver medal	Greg Robbins (USA)
Bronze medal	Chris Woodcroft (CAN)

=== Freestyle (– 57 kg) ===
RANK	NAME
Gold medal	Alejandro Puerto Díaz (CUB)
Silver medal	Robert Dawson (CAN)
Bronze medal	Jorge Olivera (MEX)

=== Freestyle (– 62 kg) ===
RANK	NAME
Gold medal	John Smith (USA)
Silver medal	Joe Domarchuk (CAN)
Bronze medal	Enrique Valdés (CUB)

=== Freestyle (– 68 kg) ===
RANK	NAME
Gold medal	Andre Metzger (USA)
Silver medal	Eugenio Montero (CUB)
Bronze medal	Pat Sullivan (CAN)

=== Freestyle (– 74 kg) ===
RANK	NAME
Gold medal	David Schultz (USA)
Silver medal	Raúl Cascaret (CUB)
Bronze medal	Gary Holmes (CAN)

=== Freestyle (– 82 kg) ===
RANK	NAME
Gold medal	Mark Schultz (USA)
Silver medal	Lou Kok (CAN)
Bronze medal	Orlando Hernández (CUB)

=== Freestyle (– 90 kg) ===
RANK	NAME
Gold medal	Doug Cox (CAN)
Silver medal	Roberto Leitão (BRA)
Bronze medal	James Scherr (USA)

== Medal table ==
Place	Nation	Gold medal	Silver medal	Bronze medal	Total
1	Cuba	10	6	3	19
2	United States	9	4	6	19
3	Canada	1	4	8	13
4	Mexico	0	2	1	3
5	Panama	0	2	0	2
6	Colombia	0	1	1	2
7	Brazil	0	1	0	1
7	Puerto Rico	0	0	1	1
Total		20	20	20	60
