= Sunkist Kids =

Wrestling club in United States

Sunkist Kids Wrestling Club
- Formation: 1976; 50 years ago
- Founder: Arthur Martori
- Type: Non-Profit
- Location: Tempe, Arizona, U.S.
- Website: www.sunkistkids.org

Sunkist Kids was an amateur wrestling club and nonprofit organization based in Tempe, Arizona. The club announced that it would be closing following the 2024 Summer Olympics.

== History ==
Sunkist Kids Wrestling Club was founded in 1976 by Arthur Martori, an Arizona farmer who started the collegiate wrestling program at Phoenix Community College, the Wrist Lock Club of the YMCA along with coach Tom Dubin, and the collegiate wrestling program at Arizona State University. Arthur went on to win multiple different championships and barely missed making the 1964 Olympic team. Following college, Matori joined his family's business and eventually became manager of the citrus operation.

Once he had the means to give back, the Sunkist Kids Wrestling Club was born. Martori helped in creating an International tournament, the Sunkist Kids International Open, providing housing and training, offering stipends and coaching opportunities. He also helped play a significant role in the development of women's wrestling.

Martori's vision helped give birth to Regional Training Centers (RTCs), award money, stipends, women's wrestling in the Olympics, world-class teams and youth programs. In 1999, Martori was inducted into the National Wrestling Hall of Fame as a Distinguished Member.

From 1976 to 2024, the Sunkist Kids Wrestling Club produced more Olympic, World, and U.S. national champions than any other elite wrestling club in the United States. During its time as a wrestling club, a member of the Sunkist Kids was on every USA Olympic or World Team.
