= Harold Nichols =

American wrestler and coach (1917–1997)

- Harold Nichols holding NCAA Championship trophy

Biographical details
- Born: March 22, 1917; Cresco, Iowa, U.S.
- Died: February 22, 1997 (aged 79); Ames, Iowa, U.S.
- Education: University of Michigan

Playing career

Wrestling
- 1936–1939: Michigan

Coaching career (HC unless noted)

Football
- 1948: Arkansas State (assistant)

Basketball
- 1948–1949: Arkansas State (assistant)

Track & Field
- 1948–149: Arkansas State

Swimming
- 1948–1949: Arkansas State

Wrestling
- 1949–1953: Arkansas State
- 1953–1985: Iowa State

Head coaching record
- Overall: 483–94–14 (Wrestling)

Accomplishments and honors

Championships
- 6x NCAA Wrestling Championships (1965, 1969, 1970, 1972, 1973, 1977); 7x Big Eight Championships (1958, 1970, 1976, 1977, 1979, 1980, 1982)

Awards
- National Wrestling Hall of Fame Distinguished Member (1978)

Medal record

Collegiate Wrestling

Representing the Michigan Wolverines

NCAA Championships
Gold medal – first place	1939 Lancaster	145 lb

Harold Nichols (March 22, 1917 – February 22, 1997) was an American collegiate wrestler and wrestling coach. As a coach, primarily at Iowa State, he won six NCAA Championships over 37 seasons. Nichols' wrestlers won 38 NCAA individual championships and seven medals at the Olympics.

== College wrestler ==
A native of Cresco, Iowa, Nichols attended the University of Michigan to wrestle under legendary wrestling coach, Cliff Keen. While at Michigan, Nichols won the 1939 NCAA wrestling championship in the 145-pound weight class. He interrupted his college studies to serve in the U.S. Army Air Corps in World War II as a pilot, reaching the rank of Lieutenant. After the war, he received a master's degree at the University of Illinois and a doctorate at Michigan.

== Wrestling coach ==
=== Arkansas State ===
After finishing his schooling, Nichols began his coaching career at Arkansas State in 1948. The school did not have a wrestling program yet so he served as an assistant in football and basketball and the head coach in track & field as well as swimming. In 1949 he was able to implement a wrestling program and amass a 37-18-3 record in five seasons.

=== Iowa State ===
When Hugo Otopalik unexpectedly died in 1953, Harold Nichols was the only person Iowa State interviewed to replace him. He would go on to helm the Iowa State wrestling program for 32 years. During his time at Iowa State, his teams went 483–94–14 in addition to not finishing outside the top four at the NCAA Tournament from 1957 to 1983. His teams won six NCAA Championships in 1965, 1969, 1970, 1972, 1973 and 1977 and seven Big Eight Championships 1958, 1970, 1976, 1977, 1979, 1980 and 1982. His wrestlers won 38 individual NCAA championships, 91 individual Big Eight Championships and seven Olympic medals.

He was considered to be "ahead of his time concerning race relations," and was a pioneer in bringing minorities into college wrestling, including African Americans, Hispanics and Cubans.

Nichols' pupil, Dan Gable, went on to coach wrestling at the University of Iowa for 21 years.

Nichols retired in 1985.

== Pottery collector ==
In addition to wrestling, Nichols had a passion for collecting pottery. In 1983, he appeared on Late Night with David Letterman with a seven-foot-tall vase from his collection, considered one of the world's largest.

== Honors ==
Nichols was inducted into the University of Michigan Athletic Hall of Honor in 1983. He was named national coach of the year three times and Wrestling Man of the Year by Amateur Wrestling News. He was also inducted into the National Wrestling Hall of Fame, the Iowa Wrestling Hall of Fame and the Helms Foundation Wrestling Hall of Fame.

== Family and death ==
Nichols died in February 1997 at age 79 in Ames, Iowa. He was survived by his wife, Ruth, and sons William and Harold.

== See also ==
- Iowa State Cyclones wrestling
