= Stanley Dziedzic =

American wrestler (born 1949)

Stan Dziedzic
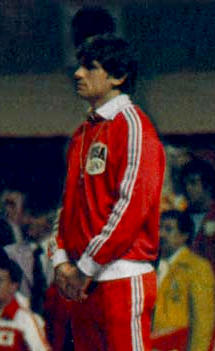
- Dziedzic at the 1976 Summer Olympics

Personal information
- Born: Stanley Joseph Dziedzic, Jr. November 5, 1949 (age 76) Allentown, Pennsylvania, U.S.
- Education: William Allen High School; Slippery Rock University of Pennsylvania
- Height: 178 cm (5 ft 10 in)
- Weight: 74 kg (163 lb)

Sport
- Sport: Freestyle wrestling
- Club: New York Athletic Club
Medal record
Event	1st	2nd	3rd
Olympic Games	0	0	1
World Championships	1	0	0
NCAA Division I Championships	1	1	1
NCAA Division II Championships	3	0	0
Total	5	1	2
Men's freestyle wrestling
Representing the United States
Olympic Games
Bronze medal – third place	1976 Montreal	74 kg
World Championships
Gold medal – first place	1977 Lausanne	74 kg
Collegiate Wrestling
Representing Slippery Rock
NCAA Division I Championships
Gold medal – first place	1971 Auburn	150 lb
Silver medal – second place	1972 College Park	158 lb
Bronze medal – third place	1970 Evanston	150 lb
NCAA Division II Championships
Gold medal – first place	1970 Ashland	150 lb
Gold medal – first place	1971 Fargo	150 lb
Gold medal – first place	1972 Oswego	158 lb

Stanley Joseph Dziedzic Jr. (born November 5, 1949) is an American former welterweight freestyle wrestler.

== High school ==
Dziedzic attended high school at William Allen High School in Allentown, Pennsylvania.

== Collegiate and amateur career ==
He was a 1972 graduate of Slippery Rock University of Pennsylvania, where his collegiate record of 118 victories and only two defeats served as Dziedzic's springboard to international achievements in the sport.

Dziedzic won three NCAA Division II Wrestling Championships while at Slippery Rock in 1970, 1971, and 1972, three Pennsylvania State Athletic Conference titles, and an NCAA Division I title as a junior in 1971. His only two losses in his collegiate record were to NCAA champions Mike Grant of Oklahoma in the 1970 NCAA semifinals and to Carl Adams of Iowa State in the 1972 NCAA finals.

He won an Olympic bronze medal in the 1976 Summer Olympics and a World championship in 1977.

== Coaching career ==
While serving as an assistant coach at Michigan State University from 1972 to 1978, Dziedzic reached the heights in freestyle wrestling in the 163-pound weight class, which at the time was rated as the toughest in the country and world. He won four national championships and two world cups, in 1975 and 1977, placing third in 1973. Dziedzic then reached the apex of his career by winning a bronze medal at the 1976 Summer Olympics and a gold medal at the 1977 World Wrestling Championships.

After retiring from competitions, Dziedzic served as a national freestyle coach for the Amateur Athletic Union from 1978 to 1984, and his tactical and technical expertise contributed significantly to the resurgence of the United States as an international force in the sport. He authored the United States Wrestling Syllabus in 1983, and was instrumental in founding the Olympic 200 project, a developmental program for high school wrestlers. He furthered the modernization of techniques and training methods of USA international teams, and served as vice president of the Coaches Commission of the International Wrestling Federation.

Dziedzic was manager of the 1984 Summer Olympics freestyle team and played an active role in Atlanta's successful bid to host the Centennial Olympics in 1996. He was elected wrestling's Man of the Year in 1980. In 1996, Dziedzic was honored as a Distinguished Member of the National Wrestling Hall of Fame. He later served as president and then vice president of USA Wrestling.
