= Carl Adams (wrestler) =

American sport wrestler (born 1950)

Biographical details
- Born: November 27, 1950 (age 75); Bay Shore, New York, U.S.
- Education: Iowa State

Playing career
- 1969–1972: Iowa State

Coaching career (HC unless noted)
- 1973–1979: Iowa State (asst.)
- 1979–1981: Rhode Island
- 1981–2014: Boston University

Administrative career (AD unless noted)
- 2014–Present: Boston University (Student Services)

Head coaching record
- Overall: 270–179–5 (Wrestling)

Accomplishments and honors

Awards
- National Wrestling Hall of Fame Distinguished Member (2019)

Medal record

Men's freestyle wrestling

Representing the United States

Pan American Games
Silver medal – second place	1975 Mexico City	74 kg

World Cup
Bronze medal – third place	1976 Toledo	74 kg

Collegiate Wrestling

Representing the Iowa State Cyclones

NCAA Division I Championships
Gold medal – first place	1971 Auburn	158 lb
Gold medal – first place	1972 College Park	158 lb

Carl Adams (born November 27, 1950) is an American retired wrestler, coach, and businessman.

== Early life ==
Adams grew up in Bay Shore, New York attending Brentwood Ross High School. His senior year he wrestled under legendary coach Joe Campo at 157 lbs and never lost a dual meet en route to winning the State Championship at his weight class.

== Wrestling career ==
Following his standout prep career, Adams continued his wrestling at Iowa State. As a freshman he wrestled at the 152 lbs weight class where he compiled a 9–2–1 dual mark and finished fifth at the NCAA Championship. That same season, the Cyclones took home the team title that year for the first time since 1965. Adams won his only Big Eight Conference championship in 1970, but was unable to place in the top eight at nationals as the Cyclones won back-to-back NCAA team titles. However, Adams was able to master his weight class in his final two seasons. In 1971, Adams was 9–2–1 in duals and won his first NCAA title by beating Oregon State's Mike Jones 18–5 in the championship match. Adams did not lose a dual match in his senior season (16–0–1) and capped off his second consecutive individual national title with a 7–4 decision against Stan Dziedzic from Slippery Rock. He was one of three Cyclone individual national titlists in 1972 (Ben Peterson, Chris Taylor), as the Cyclones were national champions for the third time in Adams' four seasons with the Cyclones. Adams concluded his collegiate career with a dual record of 45–4–4.

After ending his ISU career continued to excel on the mat at the international level. Adams won the AAU 163-pound national championship in 1973 and 1975 and placed fifth in the 1975 World Team Championship held in Minsk. He won a silver medal at the 1975 Pan American Games in Mexico City.

In 2019, Adams was inducted into the National Wrestling Hall of Fame as a Distinguished Member.

== Coaching ==
After spending time on the freestyle wrestling circuit, he began to coach. He started as an assistant in 1973 at his alma mater, Iowa State, and then his first head coaching job was at the University of Rhode Island; after that program was cut as a result of Title IX, he took over the Boston University program where was the head coach from 1981 until the program's end in 2014. After the wrestling program was dropped, Adams transitioned into an administrative role titled Coordinator of Student-Athlete Services which he still holds today.

Additionally, he runs the Carl Adams World Class Wrestling Camp, innovated several wrestling takedown machines, and has published books and videos about the sport.
