= David Zabriskie (wrestler) =

American wrestler (born 1986)

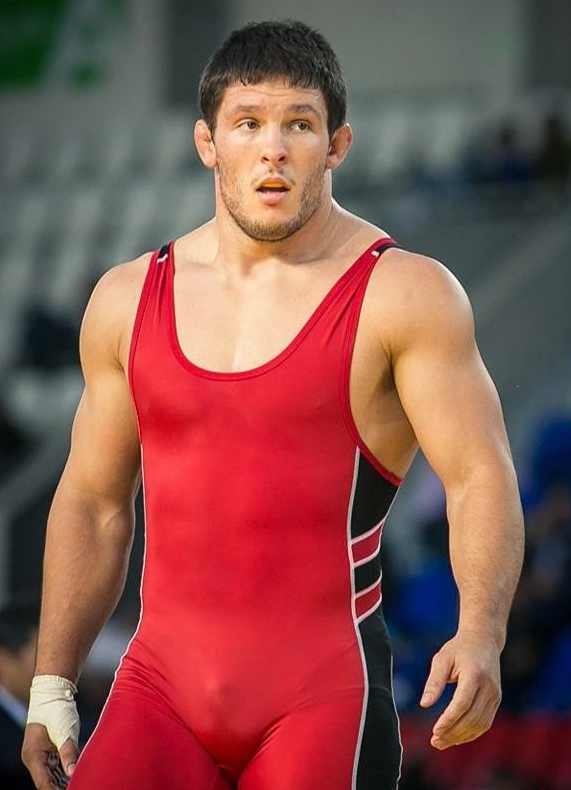
- Zabriski in 2013

Personal information
- Full name: David Zabriskie
- Born: December 19, 1986 (age 39)
- Home town: Branchville, New Jersey, U.S.
- Education: Iowa State University
- Height: 5’11"
- Weight: 210 lb (95 kg)

Sport
- Sport: Wrestling
- Weight class: 285lbs, 96kgs
- Events: Freestyle and scholastic wrestling
- College team: Iowa State Cyclones
- Club: Sunkist Kids, Lehigh Valley Wrestling Club
- Coached by: Bobby Douglas, Cael Sanderson, Kevin Jackson
- Retired: Team USA
- Now coaching: Elevation Fight Team
Medal record
Representing the United States
Men's freestyle wrestling
Pan American Championships
Bronze medal – third place	2013 Panama City	96 kg
Men's collegiate wrestling
Representing the Iowa State Cyclones
NCAA Division I Championships
Gold medal – first place	2010 Omaha	285 lb
Big 12 Championships
Gold medal – first place	2007 Columbia	285 lb
Gold medal – first place	2009 Lincoln	285 lb
Gold medal – first place	2010 Norman	285 lb
Silver medal – second place	2008 Stillwater	285 lb

David Zabriskie (born December 19, 1986) is a retired American amateur wrestler and current wrestling coach for Elevation Fight Team in Denver. Zabriskie wrestled for the Iowa State Cyclones and is a three-time Big 12 Conference champion, three-time All-American in NCAA Division I collegiate wrestling, and won the NCAA Division I Wrestling Championships in the 285lb weight class in 2010.

== Early life ==
Zabriskie began wrestling in 1996 while in the 4th grade, but did not continue after that season. He would return to the sport in 1999 to give wrestling a second try for the Branchville Bombers. It was then that Zabriskie started to find his love for the sport.

== Wrestling career ==
=== High school ===
2000-2005

Zabriskie wrestled for High Point Regional High School in Wantage Township, New Jersey under head coach John Gardner. As a freshman Zabriskie wrestled at 171lbs on Junior Varsity for the Wildcats, he would not break the varsity starting lineup until the following year. As a Sophomore Zabriskie moved up to 189lbs and compiled a 20–5 record, but failed to qualify for the Region and NJ State tournaments. During his junior year Zabriskie once again moved up a weight class to 215lbs. He compiled a record of 30-7 and placed 2nd in district 3, 2nd in region 1, and 6th at the NJSIAA State Wrestling Tournament. As a senior Zabriskie remained in the 215lbs division and went undefeated finishing 1st in District 3, 1st in Region 1, and finishing 1st in the state of New Jersey. He finished his high school career with a combined record of 89–13.

==== High school accolades ====
- High School Record 89-13
- New Jersey State Champion
- 2x State Placer

=== Collegiate ===
==== Redshirt ====
In 2005 Zabriskie used a Redshirt to postpone his NCAA eligibility.

==== Freshman ====
Zabriskie started for the Iowa State Cyclones as a freshman in the 285lb weight class. As a rookie Zabriskie would help clinch ISU's first conference wrestling title in 25 years with a 3-2 decision over the Oklahoma State Cowboys and Cowgirls Jared Rosholt in the finals of the 2007 Big 12 Conference tournament This qualified Zabriskie for the 2007 NCAA Division I Wrestling Championships at The Palace in Auburn Hills, Michigan He would go 3–2 at the tournament finishing one win short of becoming an All-American as a Freshman, but helping his team to a second-place finish as a team. Zabriskie finished his rookie season with a record of 27-8 and 13–2 in dual meets.

==== Sophomore ====
Zabriskie wrapped up his sophomore season with a 29–8 record and 16–3 in dual meets. He would again make it to the finals of the Big 12 Championships, but this time falling short of a second championship falling to Jared Rosholt in the finals. Iowa state would still win its second consecutive team title a qualify at all 10 of its varsity wrestlers for the NCAA tournament. At the 2008 NCAA tournament in St Louis, Missouri, Zabriskie would earn his first All-American honors placing 6th at the tournament, helping contribute to Iowa State's 7 all Americans that year. They finished 5th as a team.

==== Junior ====
Zabriskie concluded his junior Cyclone season with a 34–4 record and 16–1 in dual meets. He would go on to win his second Big 12 Conference title with a 3-1 decision over Missouri Tigers Mark Ellis and for the second time clinch Iowa States Big 12 Conference title making it three in a row for the Cyclones. Zabriskie would enter the 2009 NCAA wrestling tournament as the number one seeded wrestler in the 285lb division. He went on to win his first 3 matches before falling in the semi-finals to Konrad Dudziak of Duke 3–2. Zabriskie would go on to finish 5th at the 2009 NCAA tournament and as a team the Cyclones would finish in 3rd place with 5 All-Americans.

==== Senior ====
In Zabriskie's final year of competition for the Cyclones, he finished with a season record of 26-2 and 11–1 in dual meets. He would go on to win his 3rd Big 12 Conference Championship and for the fourth time qualify for the NCAA Wrestling Tournament in Omaha, Nebraska. Zabriskie would again enter the tournament as the number one seed. In his first-round match he wrestled Wisconsin's Eric Bugenhagen to a 6-2 decision. In the second-round he defeated Arizona states Erik Nye via decision 4–2. Moving on to the quarter finals he wrestled the returning 2009 NCAA Champion, Mark Ellis, winning 4–1. His win against Ellis secured Zabriskie his 3rd All-American finish and moved him into the semifinals again against Duke Blue Devils Konrad Dudziak the returning 2009's NCAA finalist. Zabriskie won the match this time by decision 6–5. In Zabriskie's first appearance in the NCAA finals he would face 2009's 3rd-place finisher, Jared Rosholt, this was the 10th time in their collegiate careers they would face off. Zabriskie won their final bout and the 2010 NCAA Title by decision 3–2.

==== Collegiate accolades ====
- Collegiate Record 116-22
- Dual Meets, 57-7
- 4x NCAA D1 Qualifier
- 3x All-American
- 3x Big 12 Conference Champion
- 4x Big 12 Conference Finalist
- NCAA Champion
- Iowa State's only 3x Heavyweight All-American
- AWN All-Rookie First Team

=== Freestyle wrestling career ===
==== Cyclone Wrestling Club ====
2010-2012

After graduating from Iowa State University in 2010, Zabriskie stayed in Ames, Iowa and competed for the Cyclone Wrestling Club and the Sunkist Kids. During this time, Zabriskie placed 4th at the US Senior Nationals, 2nd at the Olympic Trials Qualifier, and went 3–2 at the 2012 US Olympic Trials, finishing 6th.

==== Lehigh Valley Wrestling Club ====
2012-2016

After the 2012 Olympic Trials, Zabriskie moved his training to Lehigh University in Bethlehem, Pennsylvania to compete for the Lehigh Valley Athletic Club. Zabriskie would go on to All-American at U.S. Senior Nationals two more times, take a bronze at the Pan Am Championships, and take silver at the Alexander 2013 Medved Golden Grand Prix.

== Coaching ==
=== Collegiate ===
==== Colorado School of the Mines ====
2019–Present

Zabriskie was hired as an assistant wrestling coach for the 2019–2020 season wrestling for the Colorado Mines Orediggers in Golden, Colorado

=== MMA ===
==== Elevation Fight Team ====
2016–Present

Zabriskie started working with the team in the fall of 2016 and became the wrestling coach for Elevation Fight Team at the start 2017 taking over for former wrestling coach and head coach of the team Leister Bowling.

Notable Fighters

- Drew Dober
- Neil Magny
- Andrew Kapel
- Cory Sandhagen
- Alistair Overeem
- Bojan Veličković
- Shana Dobson

== Acting ==
=== Foxcatcher ===
In 2012, Zabriskie was cast for the role of Dan Bane in the 5x Academy Award nominated movie Foxcatcher. His character is based on real-life wrestler, friend, and teammate of Dave Schultz and Mark Schultz, Dan Chaid. During production Zabriskie additionally participated in the films wrestling choreography and training for the main cast helping teach Steve Carell, Channing Tatum, and Mark Ruffalo period correct wrestling technique.

== Football ==
=== Cleveland Browns ===
In 2010, after coming off of a heavyweight national championship, Zabriskie received an invitation from then head coach of the Cleveland Browns, Eric Mangini to attend their summer rookie camp Zabriskie tried out for the inside linebacker position but was not picked by the Browns after the camp. This was Zabriskie's 1st and only venture into football.

== Awards and honors ==
2016

- (4th) Dave Schultz Memorial International (97 kg)
- (silver) US Olympic Trials Qualifier (120 kg)
- Inducted into the HPRS Hall of Fame
- Inducted into the NJ Region 1 Wrestling Hall of Fame

2015

- Inducted into the Sussex County Sports Hall of Fame

2014

- (6th) US Freestyle Nationals (97 kg)

2013

- (silver) Alexander Medved Prizes (96 kg)
- (bronze) Pan American Championships (96 kg)
- (gold) Pan American Championships (Team)
- (7th) US Freestyle Nationals (96 kg)
- (5th) US Freestyle World Team Trials (96 kg)

2012

- (5th) Cerro Pelado International (96 kg)
- (6th) US Freestyle Olympic Trials (96 kg)
- (gold) Hargobind International (96 kg)

2011

- (5th) Cerro Pelado International (96 kg)
- (5th) Dave Schultz Memorial International (96 kg)
- (4th) US Freestyle Nationals (96 kg)
- (silver) US Olympic Trials Qualifier (120 kg)

2010

- (gold) NCAA Division I (285 lbs)
- (bronze) NCAA Division I (Team)
- (gold) Big 12 Conference (285 lbs)
- (silver) Big 12 Conference (Team)
- (silver) Midlands (Team)
- (silver) National Duals (Team)
- (8th) US Freestyle Nationals (120 kg)
- (silver) University World Team Trials (120 kg)
- (silver) Northern Plains Regional (120 kg)
- (4th) Sunkist Kids International (96 kg)

2009

- (gold) Big 12 Conference (285 lbs)
- (gold) Big 12 Conference (Team)
- (5th) NCAA Division I (285 lbs)
- (bronze) NCAA Division I (Team)
- (silver) Midlands (Team)
- (bronze) National Duals (Team)
- (4th) Sunkist Kids Open (120 kg)

2008

- (silver) Big 12 Conference (285 lbs)
- (gold) Big 12 Conference (Team)
- (6th) NCAA Division I (285 lbs)
- (5th) NCAA Division I (Team)
- (silver) Midlands (Team)

2007

- (gold) Big 12 Conference (285 lbs)
- (gold) Big 12 Conference (Team)
- (R12) NCAA Division I (285 lbs)
- (silver) NCAA Division I (Team)
- (silver) Midlands (Team)
- (bronze) National Duals (Team)
- Amateur Wrestling News All-Rookie First Team

2006

- (gold) Midlands (Team)

== See also ==
- List of NCAA Champions in men's wrestling
- List of professional MMA training camps
