= Hugo Otopalik =

American football player, wrestler, coach, and athletic director (1890–1953)

Biographical details
- Born: 1890; David City, Nebraska, U.S.
- Died: July 11, 1953 (aged 63); Ames, Iowa, U.S.

Playing career

Football
- 1915–1917: Nebraska

Wrestling
- 1916–1917: Nebraska
- Positions: Halfback (football); 175 lb (wrestling)

Coaching career (HC unless noted)

Wrestling
- 1920–1923: Iowa State (assistant)
- 1924–1953: Iowa State

Golf
- 1931–1946: Iowa State
- 1948–1953: Iowa State

Football
- 1919: Kearney State

Basketball
- 1919–1920: Kearney State

Administrative career (AD unless noted)
- 1918–1920: Kearney State
- 1923–1924: Iowa State

Head coaching record
- Overall: 159–66–5 (Wrestling)

Accomplishments and honors

Championships
- NCAA Championship Wrestling (1933); Big Six Wrestling (1929, 1933, 1937, 1941, 1947); Big Six Golf (1940, 1947); Big Seven Golf (1953)

Awards
- National Wrestling Hall of Fame Distinguished Member (1976)

Hugo Otopalik (1890 – July 11, 1953) was an American football player, wrestler, coach, and athletic director primarily at Iowa State University. He was the architect of the first NCAA Championships in both the sport of wrestling and golf.

== Early life ==
Otopalik, a native of David City, Nebraska, attended the University of Nebraska competing in football, wrestling, and track & field. On the gridiron Otopalik played halfback and his squads were three time MVIAA champions in 1915, 1916 and 1917. He was also a standout wrestler at Nebraska. He was an All-American and the 175 lb Western Conference champion in both 1916 and 1917.

Post-college, Otopalik fulfilled his military duty by serving in the Army during WWI. He served under General John Pershing and rose to the rank of First Sergeant before the end of the War in 1918.

== Wrestling ==
Otopalik was recruited to become the assistant wrestling coach at Iowa State under head coach Charles Mayser in 1920. In 1923 Mayser unexpectedly resigned and Hugo volunteered to take over on a temporary basis. He remained the head coach for 29 years until his death in 1953.

Otopalik took over an Iowa State program that was in its infancy and was able to establish the groundwork of a powerhouse. He led the Cyclones to their first ever NCAA team title in any sport, in 1933. Additionally he coached seven individual NCAA champions: Arthur Holding, Hugh Linn, Richard Cole, Robert Hess (twice), Merrill Frevert and George Martin. He also coached the team to five conference titles in 1929, 1933, 1937, 1941 and 1947.

At the international level, Otopalik coached the U.S. squad at the 1932 Los Angeles Olympics. Under his leadership, Robert Pearce, Jack van Bebber and Peter Mehringer brought home gold while Edgar Nemir and Jack Riley took silver.

Otopalik assisted in organizing the first NCAA Wrestling Championship. It was hosted by the Cyclones in Ames, Iowa.

Hugo served as the first secretary of the National Wrestling Coaches Association from 1932 to 1936, and served in leadership positions developing AAU wrestling in the United States.

== Golf ==
When the Big Six began sponsoring men's golf as an official sport, Iowa State needed a coach. Golf was not as elevated as football or basketball so the athletic administration didn't see a need to "hire a real coach". Otopalik was free because the golf season didn't overlap with the wrestling season, so he added head golf coach to his job description.

Otopalik helmed the golf program from 1931 to 1953, except the 1947 season, which Jack McGuire coached. His team's had Big Six Championships in 1940 and 1947 as well as a Big Seven Title in 1953. They also placed in the NCAA tournament in 1939, 1940, 1947, 1949, 1952, and 1953 with 4th, 8th, 34th, 12th, 22nd, and 19th-place finishes respectively.

In addition to his coaching duties at Iowa State, Otopalik was also instrumental in creating the first NCAA Golf Championship. As a result, he was the Tournament Director of the first NCAA Championship held at the Wakonda Club in Des Moines, IA.

== Honors ==
In 1976, he was inducted into the inaugural class of the National Wrestling Hall of Fame as a Distinguished Member.

In 2006, Otopalik was inducted into the Iowa State Cyclones Hall of Fame.
