= The Great Wojo =

American professional and amateur wrestler (1950–2025)

Personal information
- Born: Gregory M. Wojciechowski; November 13, 1950 Toledo, Ohio, U.S.
- Died: August 12, 2025 (aged 74) Toledo, Ohio, U.S.

Professional wrestling career
- Ring name(s): The Great Wojo; Greg Wojo; Greg Wojokowski; Greg Wojciechowski
- Billed height: 6 ft 0 in (183 cm)
- Billed weight: 246 lb (112 kg)
- Trained by: Dick the Bruiser
- Debut: 1981
- Retired: 1994

Medal record

Collegiate Wrestling

Representing the Toledo Rockets

NCAA Division I Championships
Gold medal – first place	1971 Auburn	Heavyweight
Silver medal – second place	1970 Evanston	Heavyweight
Silver medal – second place	1972 College Park	Heavyweight

Gregory M. Wojciechowski (November 13, 1950 – August 12, 2025) was an American amateur wrestler and professional wrestler, best known by his ring name The Great Wojo. He competed primarily for the Indianapolis-based World Wrestling Association during the 1980s, most notably being featured in the $10,000 Challenge, in which he issued an open challenge to face him in a shoot wrestling match with the winner receiving $10,000.

== Professional wrestling career ==
=== Early life and amateur background ===
Born to Richard and Elaine Wojciechowski in West Toledo, Ohio, Wojciechowski began weightlifting and strength training by the age of five. As a teenager, Wojciechowski became involved in amateur wrestling competing for Whitmer High School in Toledo, Ohio, where he won the Ohio State Heavyweight Championship in 1967 and 1968.

He went to college and wrestled for the University of Toledo, later winning the NCAA Division I and All-American heavyweight championship in 1971; he was the runner-up in 1970 and 1972 (losing in 1972 to the 415-pound Chris Taylor). A protégé of Joe Scalzo and Dick Torio, he also became 4-time AAU champion in the heavyweight division winning the championship in 1970, 1971, 1974, and 1975. Wojciechowski would attempt to make an Olympic team from 1968 through 1980. In 1968 Wojciechowski placed second in the Greco Roman trials, being an alternate, Wojciechowski would do the same for both Freestyle and Greco Roman in both 1972 and 1976. In 1980 Wojceichowski finally made an Olympic team by defeating Pete Lee and Jeff Blatnick in the Greco Roman Olympic Trials. Wojciechowski would also defeat Jimmy Jackson in the qualifying rounds in Freestyle as well as a young Bruce Baumgartner once in an Olympic Trial qualifier in Cincinnati, Ohio (18-0) and two more times in the finals of the Freestyle Olympic trials in Brockport, New York (6-3) (8-4). Wojciechowski won the trials in both Freestyle and Greco Roman that year, being the last U.S. wrestler to do so. Wojciechowski was unable to compete at the Moscow Olympics, due to the U.S.'s boycott of the games that year. He published Takedown for heavyweights as part of the Wrestling Coaching Series.

=== Professional background ===
During the U.S. Olympic boycott, he began training with Dick the Bruiser and soon started wrestling for the World Wrestling Association promotion. Wrestling under the name The Great Wojo, Wojciechowski won his first title, defeating Stormy Granzig for the WWA World Heavyweight Championship in July 1984. Although losing the title to his former trainer Dick the Bruiser in January 1985, he regained the title in September 1985, ending Dick the Bruiser's final reign as WWA Champion. After successfully defending the title for almost a year, Wojciechowski lost the title to future wrestling superstar Scott Rechsteiner during the summer of 1986. Regaining the title in May 1987, he retired as champion.

Wojciechowski also wrestled for the American Wrestling Association and the World Wrestling Federation from 1983 to 1984.

In 1991, he wrestled for Japan's W*ING. He would wrestle in the independents in Wisconsin until 1994 when he retired from wrestling.

=== The $10,000 Challenge ===
Regularly appearing on the promotion's television program Bruiser Bedlam, Wojciechowski often offered $10,000 to any person who could pin him in the ring in a "shoot style" wrestling match. Using both his amateur and professional wrestling skills, Wojciechowski was never defeated during these bouts.

=== Retirement and death ===
Continuing to occasionally wrestle in the Midwest, Canada and Japan after the close of the WWA in 1989, Wojciechowski retired from active competition and began coaching high school wrestling full-time in the Toledo area including Libbey High School and later Bowsher High School. In 1999, he suffered a dissected aorta while demonstrating a wrestling move to a heavyweight student. He underwent surgery for his ripped aorta but later recovered from the operation and continued to coach high school wrestling as well as being actively involved in establishing a wrestling program in Ohio middle schools. His son Chad was the head wrestling coach at Libbey High School.

Wojciechowski died from a heart attack on August 12, 2025, at the age of 74.

== Championships and accomplishments ==
=== Professional wrestling ===
- George Tragos/Lou Thesz Professional Wrestling Hall of Fame
  - Class of 2015
- Pro Wrestling Illustrated
  - PWI ranked him 308 of the top 500 singles wrestlers in the PWI 500 in 1991
- World Wrestling Association (Indianapolis)
  - WWA World Heavyweight Championship (Indianapolis version) (3 times)

=== Amateur wrestling ===
- Amateur Athletic Union (AAU)
  - AAU Heavyweight Championship (1971, 1972, 1974, 1975)
- National Collegiate Athletic Association (NCAA)
  - NCAA Division I Heavyweight Championship (1971)
- Ohio High School Athletic Association (OHSAA)
  - Ohio State High School Heavyweight Championship (1967, 1968)
- University of Toledo
  - University of Toledo Athletics Hall of Fame
- USA Wrestling
  - U.S. Olympic Wrestling team member (1980)
  - U.S. Olympic Wrestling team alternate member (1984, 1988)
- National Wrestling Hall of Fame
  - Distinguished Member (2025)
