= Jimmy Jackson (wrestler) =

American wrestler (1956–2008)

Personal information
- Full name: James Earl Jackson
- Born: July 28, 1956 Winsdor, Ontario, Canada
- Died: June 17, 2008 (aged 51) East Lansing, Michigan, U.S.
- Home town: Grand Rapids, Michigan, U.S.
- Height: 6 ft 6 in (198 cm)
- Weight: 350 lb (159 kg)
Medal record
Men's freestyle wrestling
Representing the United States
Pan American Games
| Gold medal – first place | 1979 San Juan | +100 kg |
Collegiate Wrestling
Representing the Oklahoma State Cowboys
NCAA Division I Championships
| Gold medal – first place | 1976 Tucson | Heavyweight |
| Gold medal – first place | 1977 Norman | Heavyweight |
| Gold medal – first place | 1978 College Park | Heavyweight |

James Earl Jackson (July 28, 1956 – June 17, 2008) was an American freestyle wrestler, who competed at the 1976 Summer Olympics. Born in Windsor, Ontario, Jackson grew up in Grand Rapids, Michigan where he was a graduate of Ottawa Hills High School. At the 1979 Pan American Games he finished first in the freestyle unlimited category. At Oklahoma State, he was a three-time All-American and NCAA champion at heavyweight. Jackson was briefly a professional wrestler in Mid-South Wrestling.

In 2023, Jackson was inducted into the National Wrestling Hall of Fame as a Distinguished Member.
