= Chris Taylor (wrestler) =

American professional and amateur wrestler (1950–1979)

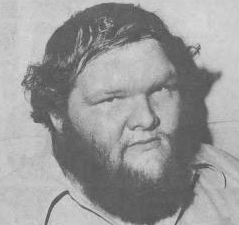
- Taylor, circa 1979

Personal information
- Born: June 13, 1950 Dowagiac, Michigan, U.S.
- Died: June 30, 1979 (aged 29) Story City, Iowa, U.S.
- Height: 6 ft 5 in (196 cm)
- Weight: 412 lb (187 kg)

Sport
- Country: United States
- Sport: Greco-Roman, Freestyle, and Folkstyle
- College team: Muskegon; Iowa State
- Team: USA
- Coached by: Harold Nichols
Medal record
Men's freestyle wrestling
Representing the United States
Olympic Games
Bronze medal – third place	1972 Munich	+100 kg
Collegiate Wrestling
Representing the Iowa State Cyclones
NCAA Division I Championships
Gold medal – first place	1972 College Park	Heavyweight
Gold medal – first place	1973 Seattle	Heavyweight

Christopher J. Taylor (June 13, 1950 – June 30, 1979) was an American super-heavyweight wrestler. He competed in freestyle and Greco-Roman events at the 1972 Summer Olympics and won a bronze medal in the freestyle. At 412 pounds (187 kg), he was the heaviest Olympian ever until the appearance of judoka Ricardo Blas Jr. in 2008 (weight limits have since been imposed).

== Amateur wrestling ==
The 6 ft 5 in (196 cm) Taylor wrestled for Dowagiac High School in Dowagiac, Michigan and then in college at Muskegon Community College and Iowa State University (winning the NCAA heavyweight championship in 1972 and 1973 by defeating Greg Wojciechowski and Jim Hagen, respectively). Taylor won the bronze medal at the 1972 Olympics in freestyle wrestling. He lost only to Aleksandr Medved. It appeared Medved was stalling, but the referee awarded a point to the Soviet, charging Taylor with a lack of action. Later admitting that he felt sorry for Medved because of Taylor's size, the referee was dismissed from the Olympic tournament and banned from international officiating. In the Greco-Roman competition, Taylor was unexpectedly suplexed and pinned by a much lighter Wilfried Dietrich, whom he defeated a week before in the freestyle contest.

== Professional wrestling career ==
Taylor wrestled professionally in the American Wrestling Association. His debut was in 1973 vs Rene Goulet. Taylor faced various wrestlers, among them future star Ric Flair. Taylor, trained by Verne Gagne and Billy Robinson, was being groomed to be a major star. Chronic health problems limited the amount of work he could do, and said problems forced him to retire from the ring in 1977. He is often seen in video highlights shown at the AWA training camp, most notably in the WWE DVD releases The Spectacular Legacy Of the AWA and The Definitive Ric Flair Collection. Also appears in a clip on The Nature Boy, an ESPN 30 for 30 documentary about Ric Flair's life. He defeated Flair.

Taylor's finishing move was a variation of the bearhug.

== Personal life ==
On September 9, 1973, Taylor married Lynn Hart. He died of cardiovascular complications at his home in Story City, Iowa, at the age of 29, two years after health problems caused him to retire from professional wrestling. He is buried in Riverside Cemetery in Dowagiac, Michigan. The couple had one daughter, Jenny Taylor.

== Championships and accomplishments ==
- National Wrestling Hall of Fame
  - Distinguished Member (Class of 2012)
- Iowa State Wrestling Hall Of Fame
  - Class of 2012
- George Tragos/Lou Thesz Professional Wrestling Hall of Fame
  - Class of 2013
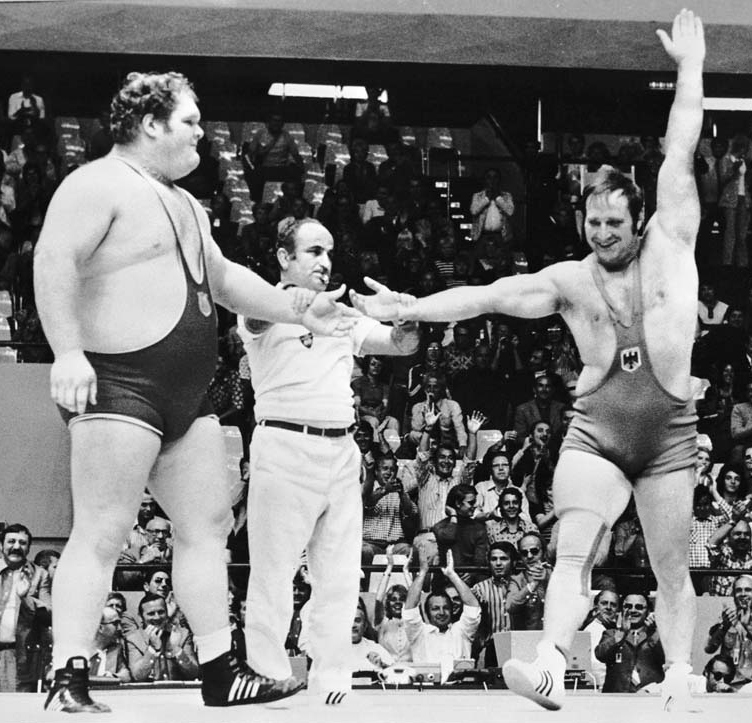
Taylor vs. Dietrich at the 1972 Olympics

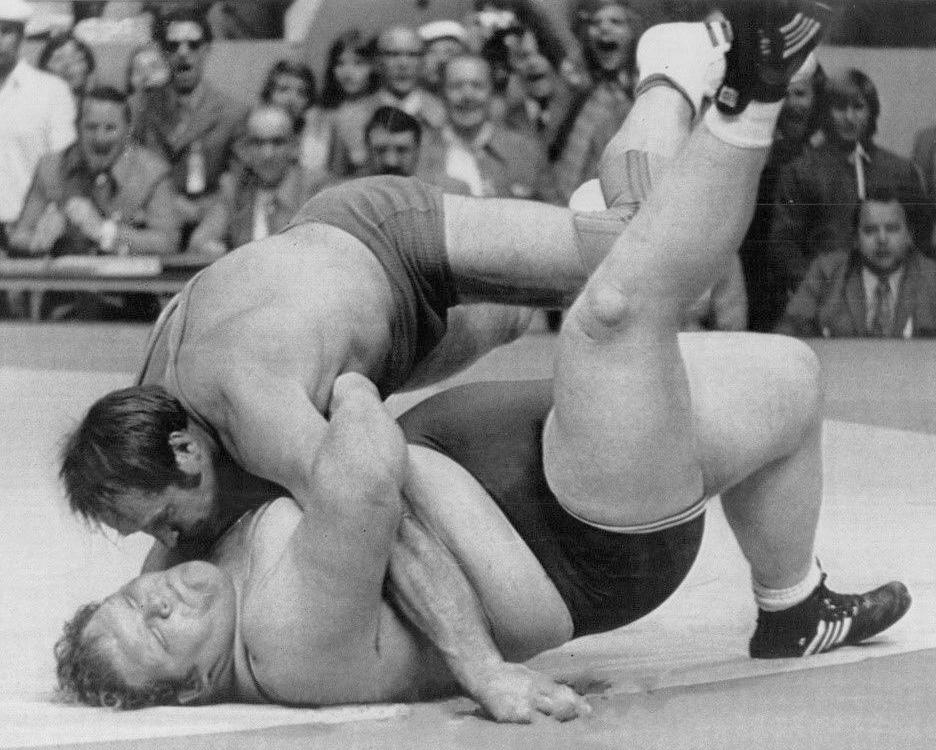
Taylor vs. Dietrich at the 1972 Olympics

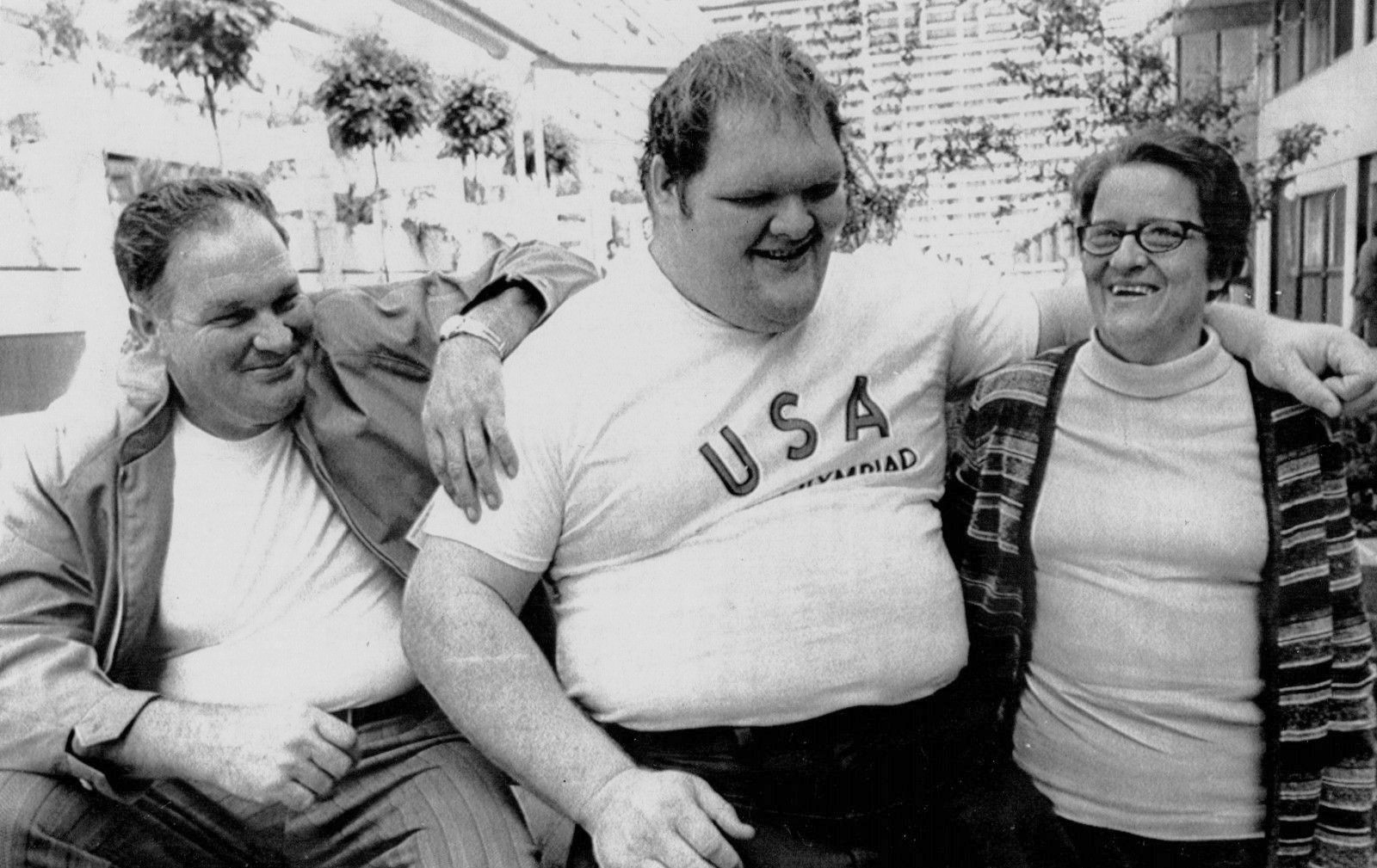
Taylor with family at the 1972 Olympics

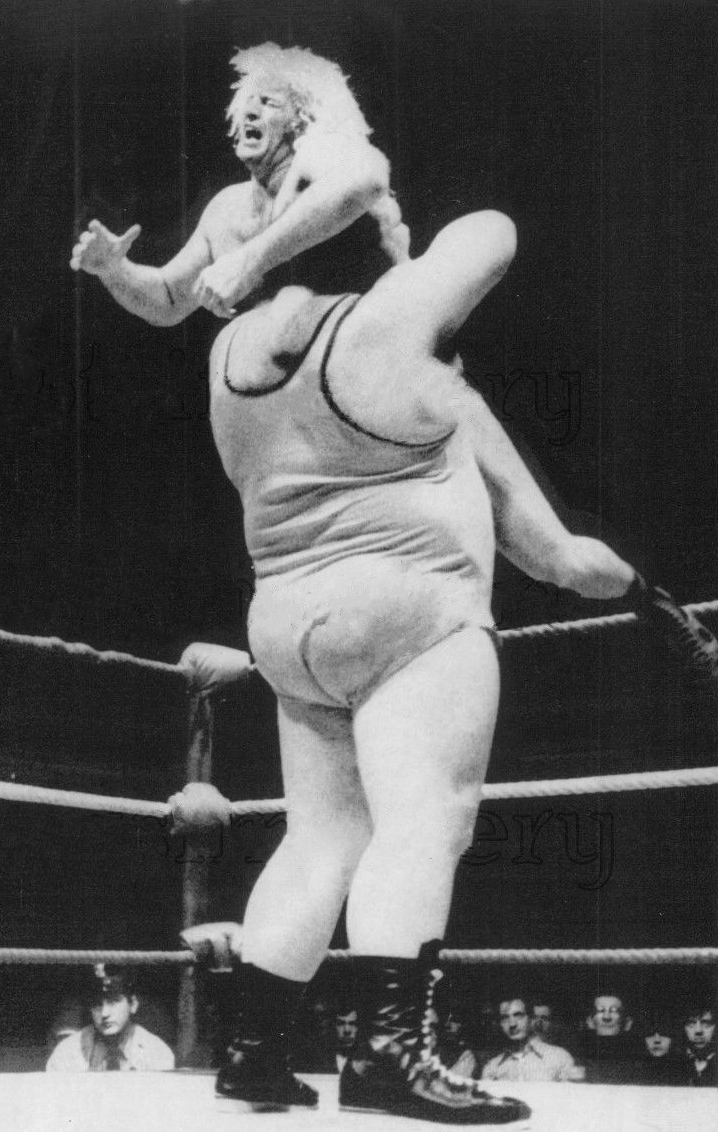
Taylor vs. Goulet in 1973
