= Robert Buzzard =

American wrestler

Personal information
- Full name: Robert Gregory Buzzard
- Born: December 9, 1942 (age 83) Waterloo, Iowa, U.S.

Sport
- Country: United States
- Sport: Wrestling
- Events: Greco-Roman and Folkstyle
- College team: Iowa State
- Team: USA
- Coached by: Harold Nichols

Robert Gregory "Bob" Buzzard (born December 9, 1942, in Waterloo, Iowa) is an American former wrestler who competed at the 1972 Summer Olympics in Greco-Roman wrestling.
