= Wade Schalles =

American wrestler (born 1951)

Personal information
- Born: September 10, 1951 (age 74) Hollidaysburg, Pennsylvania, U.S.
Medal record
Collegiate Wrestling
Representing the Clarion Golden Eagles
NCAA Division I Championships
Gold medal – first place	1972 College Park	150 lb
Gold medal – first place	1973 Seattle	158 lb
NCAA Division II Championships
Gold medal – first place	1972 Oswego	150 lb
Gold medal – first place	1973 Brookings	158 lb
Sport wrestling
Representing United States
Summer Universiade
Gold medal – first place	1977 Sofia	74 kg

Wade Schalles (born September 10, 1951) is an American former folkstyle and freestyle wrestler. In college, he represented Clarion University of Pennsylvania. He is also an accomplished black belt judoka and samboist, winning national championships in both disciplines. He created several unique wrestling techniques, including the Spladle, Lazy Man Cradle, and the Clemson Roll. In 1991, Schalles was inducted into the National Wrestling Hall of Fame as a Distinguished Member.

== Early life and education ==
Schalles graduated from Hollidaysburg High School in Hollidaysburg, Pennsylvania in 1969, and then went on to graduate from Clarion University of Pennsylvania with a secondary education degree in 1974.

== College wrestling ==
Schalles wrestled at Clarion from 1970–1974. He was an NCAA Division I champion and NCAA Division II champion in 1972 and 1973, winning the outstanding wrestler award in both divisions in 1972.

== Coaching career ==
He served as an assistant coach at Arizona State (1976), assistant coach at South Dakota State (1977), Head Coach at Clemson (1978–83), and Head Coach Old Dominion (1983–85).

In 2014, he became head coach of Scientific Wrestling.

== Schalles Award ==
The Schalles Award, presented annually by Cliff Keen Athletics and WIN magazine to the nation’s best college and high school pinners, is named after Schalles, who set the college pin record at Clarion (Pa.) State where he defeated 153 of 159 opponents and pinned 109.
