= 1971 NCAA University Division Wrestling Championships =

American collegiate wrestling tournament

Tournament information
- Sport: College wrestling
- Location: Auburn, Alabama
- Dates: March 25, 1971–March 27, 1971
- Host(s): Auburn University
- Venue(s): Memorial Coliseum

Final positions
- Champions: Oklahoma State (27th title)
- 1st runners-up: Iowa State
- 2nd runners-up: Michigan State

Tournament statistics
- Attendance: 25,000
- MVP: Darrell Keller (Oklahoma State)

The 1971 NCAA University Division Wrestling Championships were the 41st NCAA University Division Wrestling Championships to be held. Auburn University in Auburn, Alabama hosted the tournament at Memorial Coliseum.

Oklahoma State took home the team championship with 94 points and three individual champions.

== Team results ==
Rank	School	Points
1	Oklahoma State	94
2	Iowa State	66
3	Michigan State	44
T-4	Penn State	43
T-4	Oregon State	43
6	Oklahoma	39
7	Lehigh	32
8	Washington	30
9	Cal Poly-SLO	27
T-10	Portland State	26
T-10	Navy	26

== Individual finals ==
Weight class	Championship match (champion in boldface)
118 lbs	**Greg Johnson**, Michigan State DEC Tom Schuler, Navy, 6–5
126 lbs	**Yoshiro Fujita**, Oklahoma State MAJOR Ken Donaldson, Air Force, 13–2
134 lbs	**Roger Weigel**, Oregon State MAJOR Dwayne Keller, Oklahoma State, 15–7
142 lbs	**Darrell Keller**, Oklahoma State DEC Larry Owings, Washington, 16–12
150 lbs	**Stan Dziedzic**, Slippery Rock DEC Jay Arneson, Oklahoma State, 6–1
158 lbs	**Carl Adams**, Iowa State MAJOR Mike R. Jones, Oregon State, 18–5
167 lbs	**Andy Matter**, Penn State RD Steve Shields, Lehigh, 5–5, 0–0
177 lbs	**Geoff Baum**, Oklahoma State DEC Al Nacin, Iowa State, 10–3
190 lbs	**Ben Peterson**, Iowa State DEC Vince Paolano, Syracuse 11–6
UNL	**Greg Wojciechowski**, Toledo DEC Dave Joyner, Penn State, 5–3
