= Jessica Lewis =

Jessica Lewis may refer to:

- Jessica Cooper Lewis, Bermudian Paralympic athlete
- Jessica Lewis (composer), American composer
- Jessica Lewis, Assistant Secretary of State for Political-Military Affairs
- Jessica Lewis, American contestant of Survivor: Millennials vs. Gen X

== See also ==
- Jess Lewis, American amateur wrestler and American football player
