= Iowa State Cyclones wrestling =

Wrestling team of Iowa State University

Iowa State Cyclones men's wrestling
- Founded: 1916; 110 years ago
- University: Iowa State University
- Head coach: Brent Metcalf
- Conference: Big 12
- Location: Ames, IA
- Arena: Hilton Coliseum (capacity: 14,356)
- Nickname: Cyclones
- Colors: Cardinal and gold
- Fight song: ISU Fights

Team national championships
- 8

National championship years
- 1933, 1965, 1969, 1970, 1972, 1973, 1977, 1987

NCAA individual champions
- 71 (by 50 athletes)

All-Americans
- 310 (by 163 athletes)

Conference championships
- 214 (by 84 athletes)

Conference Tournament championships
- Big Eight: 1929, 1933, 1937, 1941, 1947, 1958, 1970, 1976, 1977, 1979, 1980, 1982, 1987, 1993 Big 12: 2007, 2008, 2009, 2024

The Iowa State Cyclones men's wrestling team represents Iowa State University (ISU) and competes in the Big 12 Conference of NCAA Division I. The Cyclones are 8-time national champions, 17-time national runner-ups, and have 45 team trophy finishes. The team is coached by Brent Metcalf. The Cyclones host their home meets at Hilton Coliseum on Iowa State's campus. Iowa State became the second collegiate wrestling program to reach 1,100 dual wins on January 23, 2022.

Iowa State will add women's wrestling as a varsity sport in the 2027–28 school year.

== Coaches ==
=== Charles Mayser (1916–1923) ===
Charles Mayser was the founding father of Iowa State wrestling. In addition to his wrestling coaching duties, “Uncle Charlie” performed coaching duties in baseball and football, as well as being the athletic director. Mayser joined the athletic staff in 1916, the initial season of Cyclone wrestling. He coached for eight years and was responsible for five undefeated teams during his tenure. Despite lack of equipment and facilities, Mayser's squads dominated the Midwestern wrestling scene. His teams suffered only two defeats in his last six years and his last two squads were named unofficial national champions by Amateur Wrestling News. Mayser left Iowa State in 1923 to head the Franklin & Marshall College athletic department.

During his eight years at Iowa State, Mayser went 35–4 during including one conference championship.

=== Hugo Otopalik (1924–1953) ===
Hugo Otopalik took over head coaching duties after serving as an assistant on Charles Mayser's staff for four years. In his 28 years as head coach, Otopalik's teams claimed seven conference championships and one NCAA title. He ended his illustrious career with a 159-66-5 mark and eight NCAA individual champions. Besides having a huge impact on Iowa State athletics, Otopalik also made his mark on the international scene. In 1932, Otopalik served as head coach of the U.S. Olympic squad, which captured the team title at the Los Angeles Games. He also headed the National AAU Wrestling Committee for five years.

During his 29 years at Iowa State, Otopalik went 159-65-6 including four conference championships and one NCAA championship.

=== Dr. Harold Nichols (1954–1985) ===
When you talk Iowa State wrestling history, Harold Nichols looms large. From 1965 to 1973, Nichols’ squads were the most dominant in wrestling, compiling five NCAA titles and three runner-up finishes. Nichols was named the successor to Hugo Otopalik in 1954 after serving as head coach at Arkansas State for five years. His ISU teams racked up six NCAA titles, seven Big Eight titles and produced 38 NCAA individual champions and 91 Big Eight titlists. His career record at Iowa State is an untouchable 456-75-11. Nichols was named coach of the year three times and was tabbed Wrestling Man of the Year by Amateur Wrestling News in 1966. He is a member of the Helms Foundation Wrestling Hall of Fame, Iowa Wrestling Hall of Fame, National Wrestling Hall of Fame and served as vice-chairman of the United States Olympic Wrestling Committee. Nichols retired from coaching in 1985.

During his 31 years at Iowa State, Dr. Nichols went 456-75-11 including seven conference championships and six NCAA championships.

=== Jim Gibbons (1985–1992) ===
In 1986, Jim Gibbons took over the reins of the Cyclone wrestling squad at age 26. Gibbons wrestled at ISU for Dr. Harold Nichols and earned All-America status three times, including the 1981 NCAA individual title at 134 pounds. Following his collegiate career, Gibbons served as an assistant coach at his alma mater for two years before taking over the head coaching duties. During his seven years as the Cyclone skipper, Gibbons’ squads claimed one Big Eight crown and captured the NCAA title in 1987. He also coached seven individual NCAA champions while compiling a 96-32-1 career coaching mark. After winning the NCAA Championships in 1987, Gibbons was named national coach of the year. He was named Big Eight Coach of the year in 1991. Gibbons retired from coaching after the 1992 season.

During his seven years at Iowa State, Gibbons went 96-32-1 including one conference championship and one NCAA championship.

=== Bobby Douglas (1992–2006) ===
A wrestling legend in his own right, Bobby Douglas was an NCAA runner-up at Oklahoma State and part of two Olympic teams as a competitor, finishing fourth at featherweight in the 1964 Tokyo Games. He was captain of the 1968 U.S. Olympic team in Mexico. Douglas coached the 1992 U.S. Olympic team whose 10 members placed among the top 10 in their respective weight classes, a U.S. Olympic first. He was a member of the U.S. Olympic coaching staff in 1976, 1980, 1984, and 1988. Douglas, a member of the National Wrestling Hall of Fame, was also on the 1996 and 2004 U.S. Olympic coaching staffs. Douglas began his collegiate coaching career at Cal-Santa Barbara before coaching three national champions and 58 All-Americans from 1975 to 1992 at Arizona State. His 1988 Sun Devil squad won the NCAA team title in Ames. He furthered his legacy at Iowa State, winning 198 dual matches. Douglas coached Cyclone wrestlers to 10 individual NCAA titles and 52 All-America performances. He is one of four collegiate coaches to win at least 400 duals matches.

During his 14 years at Iowa State, Douglas went 198-75-3.

=== Cael Sanderson (2006–2009) ===
Cael Sanderson, arguably the greatest collegiate wrestler of all time, took the reins of the Iowa State wrestling team at the start of the 2006–07 season. After posting an undefeated record of 159–0 as a collegiate wrestler for ISU, Sanderson won an Olympic gold medal at the 2004 Summer Games in Athens, Greece. The former four-time NCAA champion brought aboard the top recruiting class in 2005, ranked by both Intermat and Amateur Wrestling News.

Sanderson led the Cyclone grapplers to an NCAA runner-up finish in his first year at the helm and guided the Iowa State squad to three consecutive Big 12 Conference championships. ISU didn't finish outside of the top five at the NCAA Championships under Sanderson's direction. Sanderson's 2007–08 squad garnered seven All-Americans at the NCAA Championships in St. Louis, which was Iowa State's largest All-American count since seven earned honors in the 1992–93 season. In total, Cyclone wrestlers notched 15 All-America honors in his tenure. Cael Sanderson accepted the head coaching position at Penn State in April 2009.

During his three years at Iowa State, Sanderson went 44–10 including three conference championships.

=== Kevin Jackson (2009–2017) ===
Kevin Jackson was introduced as Iowa State's head wrestling coach on April 30, 2009. As a college wrestler, he attended LSU and earned All-America honors three times before the school dropped the sport. He transferred to ISU for his senior year and captained the Cyclones’ last NCAA championship team (1987), earning another All-America award with an NCAA runner-up finish and registering a 30-3-1 record. In 1992, Jackson won a gold medal at the Barcelona Olympic Games. Since 1992, Jackson has coached for team USA at three summer Olympics including being the head coach for the Beijing Olympics in 2008. Jackson's last season for the Cyclones was a struggle, with a 1-12 dual meet record and scoring only one team point in the NCAA tournament.

=== Kevin Dresser (2017–2026) ===
Dresser was announced as the new head coach on February 20, 2017.

=== Brent Metcalf (2026–present) ===
Metcalf was announced as head coach of the Iowa State men's wrestling program on April 16, 2026.

== Championships ==
=== Team championships ===
Titles	Type	Year
National Championships
8	NCAA Tournament Team Champions	1933, 1965, 1969, 1970, 1972, 1973, 1977, 1987
8 Total
Conference Championships
14	Big Eight Conference Team Champion	1929, 1933, 1937, 1941, 1947, 1958, 1970, 1976, 1977, 1979, 1980, 1982, 1987, 1993
4	Big 12 Conference Team Champion	2007, 2008, 2009, 2024
18 Total

=== Individual NCAA championships ===
Individual NCAA Champions
Year	Name	Weight Class
1928	Arthur Holding	138
1930	Hugh Linn	135
1931	Richard Cole	135
1932	Robert Hess	174
1933	Merrill Frevert	155
1933	George Martin	165
1933	Robert Hess	175
1948	Glen Brand	174
1958	Les Anderson	130
1958	Ron Gray	147
1959	Larry Hayes	137
1959	Ron Gray	147
1960	Les Anderson	137
1960	Larry Hayes	147
1961	Larry Hayes	147
1964	Gordon Hassman	157
1965	Veryl Long	147
1965	Tom Peckham	177
1966	Tom Peckham	177
1967	Vic Marcucci	160
1968	Dan Gable	130
1968	Dale Bahr	145
1968	Reg Wicks	160
1969	Dan Gable	137
1969	Jason Smith	167
1969	Chuck Jean	177
1970	Dave Martin	158
1970	Jason Smith	167
1970	Chuck Jean	177
1972	Carl Adams	158
1972	Ben Peterson	190
1972	Chris Taylor	HWT
1973	Rich Binek	177
1973	Chris Taylor	HWT
1975	Al Nacin	190
1977	Frank Santana	190
1978	Mike Land	126
1979	Kelly Ward	158

Individual NCAA Champions
Year	Name	Weight Class
1981	Jim Gibbons	134
1981	Nate Carr	150
1982	Nate Carr	150
1983	Nate Carr	150
1984	Kevin Darkus	126
1985	Joe Gibbons	142
1987	Billy Kelly	126
1987	Tim Krieger	150
1987	Stewart Carter	158
1987	Eric Voelker	190
1988	Mike van Arsdale	167
1989	Time Krieger	150
1989	Eric Voelker	190
1996	Chris Bono	150
1997	Barry Weldon	177
1999	Cael Sanderson	184
2000	Cael Sanderson	184
2001	Cael Sanderson	184
2002	Aaron Holker	141
2002	Joe Heskett	165
2002	Cael Sanderson	197
2004	Zach Roberson	133
2006	Nate Gallick	141
2007	Trent Paulson	157
2009	Jake Varner	197
2010	Jake Varner	197
2010	David Zabriskie	HWT
2011	Jon Reader	174
2015	Kyven Gadson	197
2021	David Carr	157
2024	David Carr	165

=== Individual Conference championships ===
Individual Conference Champions
Year	Name	Weight Class	Conference
1924	Henry Pillard	175	MVIAA
1924	A.E. Anderson	HWT	MVIAA
1925	Clell Kurtz	125	MVIAA
1925	Dwight Meyer	135	MVIAA
1925	Henry Pillard	HWT	MVIAA
1926	Harold Boyvey	125	MVIAA
1926	Ralph Prunty	155	MVIAA
1927	Arthur Holding	138	MVIAA
1928	Arthur Holding	138	MVIAA
1929	Arthur Holding	138	MVIAA
1930	Kynard McCormick	115	MVIAA
1930	Doris Williams	125	MVIAA
1933	Gilbert Golden	126	Big Six
1933	Gordon Rosenberg	135	Big Six
1933	Kenneth Ruggles	145	Big Six
1933	Merrill Frevert	155	Big Six
1933	George Martin	165	Big Six
1933	Robert Hess	175	Big Six
1934	Glenn Yarger	118	Big Six
1934	Gilbert Golden	126	Big Six
1934	Jim Ruggles	155	Big Six
1935	Keith Cranston	135	Big Six
1937	George Haynes	118	Big Six
1937	Al Stoecker	HWT	Big Six
1938	Kenneth Stewart	118	Big Six
1938	Frank Linn	145	Big Six
1939	Ray Stone	128	Big Six
1939	Royce Cox	155	Big Six
1939	Joe Loucks	165	Big Six
1939	Howard Buck	HWT	Big Six
1940	Sam Linn	165	Big Six
1940	Howard Buck	HWT	Big Six
1941	Ray Stone	128	Big Six
1941	Joe Loucks	155	Big Six
1941	Sam Linn	165	Big Six
1941	Dick Johnson	175	Big Six
1947	Charles Nelson	128	Big Six
1947	Pat Bush	155	Big Six
1947	Glen Brand	175	Big Six
1948	Glen Brand	175	Big Seven
1949	Dick Ditsworth	145	Big Seven
1949	Pat Bush	155	Big Seven
1949	Donald Thomas	165	Big Seven
1950	Bob Wilson	136	Big Seven
1952	Robert Wirds	177	Big Seven
1952	Melvin Waldon	HWT	Big Seven
1953	Robert Wirds	177	Big Seven
1954	Hugh Linn	123	Big Seven
1954	Sam Ruzic	137	Big Seven
1954	Ron Larson	167	Big Seven
1955	Kent Townley	123	Big Seven
1955	Robert Formanek	157	Big Seven
1956	Dean Corner	137	Big Seven
1956	Robert Formanek	157	Big Seven
1956	Frank Powell	167	Big Seven
1957	Ron Gray	147	Big Seven
1958	Les Anderson	130	Big Eight
1958	Ron Gray	147	Big Eight
1958	Frank Powell	177	Big Eight
1959	Ron Gray	147	Big Eight
1959	Ron Meleney	177	Big Eight
1960	Les Anderson	137	Big Eight
1960	Larry Hayes	147	Big Eight
1961	Don Webster	115	Big Eight
1961	Larry Hayes	147	Big Eight
1963	Lowell Stewart	115	Big Eight
1963	Veryl Long	147	Big Eight
1964	Roger Sebert	115	Big Eight
1964	Bob Buzzard	137	Big Eight
1964	Gordon Hassman	157	Big Eight
1964	Tom Peckham	167	Big Eight
1965	Roger Sebert	123	Big Eight
1965	Bob Buzzard	137	Big Eight
1965	Gordon Hassman	157	Big Eight
1966	Vic Marcucci	160	Big Eight
1966	Tom Peckham	177	Big Eight
1966	Steve Shippos	HWT	Big Eight
1967	Vic Marcucci	167	Big Eight
1968	Mike Schmauss	115	Big Eight
1968	Dan Gable	137	Big Eight
1968	Jim Duschen	191	Big Eight
1969	Dan Gable	137	Big Eight
1969	Jim Duschen	191	Big Eight
1970	Phil Parker	134	Big Eight
1970	Dan Gable	142	Big Eight
1970	Carl Adams	150	Big Eight
1970	Jason Smith	167	Big Eight
1970	Ben Peterson	190	Big Eight
1971	Dave Bock	150	Big Eight
1971	Ben Peterson	190	Big Eight
1972	Rich Binek	177	Big Eight
1972	Ben Peterson	190	Big Eight
1972	Chris Taylor	HWT	Big Eight
1973	Pete Galea	150	Big Eight
1973	Keith Abens	167	Big Eight
1973	Al Nacin	190	Big Eight
1973	Chris Taylor	HWT	Big Eight
1974	Pete Galea	142	Big Eight
1974	Bob Holland	150	Big Eight
1974	Al Nacin	190	Big Eight
1975	Pete Galea	150	Big Eight
1975	Bob Holland	158	Big Eight
1975	Willie Gadson	177	Big Eight
1975	Al Nacin	190	Big Eight
1976	Bob Antonacci	126	Big Eight
1976	Pete Galea	150	Big Eight
1976	Dave Powell	167	Big Eight
1976	Willie Gadson	177	Big Eight
1976	Frank Santana	190	Big Eight

Individual Conference Champions
Year	Name	Weight Class	Conference
1977	Johnnie Jones	118	Big Eight
1977	Mike Land	126	Big Eight
1977	Frank Santana	190	Big Eight
1978	Mike Land	126	Big Eight
1978	Randy Nielsen	142	Big Eight
1978	Joe Zuspann	150	Big Eight
1978	Kelly Ward	158	Big Eight
1979	Don Finnegan	118	Big Eight
1979	Mike Land	134	Big Eight
1979	Kelly Ward	158	Big Eight
1979	Dave Powell	167	Big Eight
1979	Tom Waldon	HWT	Big Eight
1980	Mike Picozzi	118	Big Eight
1980	Jim Gibbons	134	Big Eight
1980	Nate Carr	150	Big Eight
1980	Perry Hummel	167	Big Eight
1980	Dave Allen	177	Big Eight
1981	Nate Carr	150	Big Eight
1981	Perry Hummel	167	Big Eight
1981	Dave Allen	177	Big Eight
1981	John Forshee	190	Big Eight
1982	Kevin Darkus	118	Big Eight
1982	Joe Gibbons	126	Big Eight
1982	Jim Gibbons	134	Big Eight
1983	Kevin Darkus	126	Big Eight
1983	Mike Mann	190	Big Eight
1983	Wayne Cole	HWT	Big Eight
1984	Kevin Darkus	126	Big Eight
1985	John Thorn	126	Big Eight
1985	Joe Gibbons	142	Big Eight
1986	Billy Kelly	126	Big Eight
1986	Tim Krieger	150	Big Eight
1986	Bill Tate	158	Big Eight
1987	Billy Kelly	126	Big Eight
1987	Tim Krieger	150	Big Eight
1987	Stewart Carter	158	Big Eight
1987	Kevin Jackson	167	Big Eight
1987	Eric Voelker	190	Big Eight
1988	Steve Knight	126	Big Eight
1988	Tim Krieger	150	Big Eight
1988	Mike van Arsdale	167	Big Eight
1988	Eric Voelker	190	Big Eight
1989	Jeff Gibbons	142	Big Eight
1989	Tim Krieger	150	Big Eight
1989	Steve Hamilton	158	Big Eight
1989	Eric Voelker	190	Big Eight
1991	Matt Johnson	177	Big Eight
1991	Todd Kinney	HWT	Big Eight
1992	Eric Akin	118	Big Eight
1992	Torrae Jackson	150	Big Eight
1992	Steve Hamilton	167	Big Eight
1992	Matt Johnson	177	Big Eight
1992	Jamie Cutler	HWT	Big Eight
1993	Eric Akin	118	Big Eight
1993	Jodie Wilson	142	Big Eight
1993	Torrae Jackson	150	Big Eight
1993	Matt Johnson	177	Big Eight
1993	Todd Kinney	HWT	Big Eight
1994	Eric Akin	118	Big Eight
1995	Colothdian Tate	134	Big Eight
1996	Jason Nurre	118	Big Eight
1996	Dwight Hinson	126	Big Eight
1996	Derek Mountsier	142	Big Eight
1996	Chris Bono	150	Big Eight
1997	Dwight Hinson	126	Big 12
1997	Chris Bono	150	Big 12
1998	Dwight Hinson	126	Big 12
1999	Joe Heskett	165	Big 12
1999	Cael Sanderson	184	Big 12
1999	Zach Thompson	197	Big 12
2000	Cody Sanderson	133	Big 12
2000	Cael Sanderson	184	Big 12
2000	Trent Hynek	HWT	Big 12
2001	Joe Heskett	165	Big 12
2001	Cael Sanderson	184	Big 12
2002	Aaron Holker	141	Big 12
2002	Joe Heskett	165	Big 12
2002	Cael Sanderson	197	Big 12
2004	Nate Gallick	141	Big 12
2005	Nate Gallick	141	Big 12
2005	Kurt Backes	184	Big 12
2006	Nate Gallick	141	Big 12
2006	Trent Paulson	157	Big 12
2006	Kurt Backes	184	Big 12
2007	Trent Paulson	157	Big 12
2007	David Zabriskie	HWT	Big 12
2008	Nick Fanthorpe	133	Big 12
2008	Nick Gallick	141	Big 12
2008	Cyler Sanderson	157	Big 12
2008	Jake Varner	184	Big 12
2009	Nick Fanthorpe	133	Big 12
2009	David Zabriskie	HWT	Big 12
2010	Jake Varner	197	Big 12
2010	David Zabriskie	HWT	Big 12
2011	Jon Reader	174	Big 12
2012	Matt Gibson	HWT	Big 12
2013	Kyven Gadson	197	Big 12
2014	Lelund Weatherspoon	184	Big 12
2014	Kyven Gadson	197	Big 12
2015	Kyven Gadson	197	Big 12
2016	Lelund Weatherspoon	174	Big 12
2019	Chase Straw	157	Big 12
2020	Ian Parker	141	Big 12
2020	David Carr	157	Big 12
2021	David Carr	157	Big 12
2021	Gannon Gremmel	HWT	Big 12
2022	David Carr	157	Big 12
2023	Paniro Johnson	149	Big 12
2023	David Carr	165	Big 12
2024	Anthony Echemendia	141	Big 12
2024	Yonger Bastida	HWT	Big 12
2025	Paniro Johnson	149	Big 12

== Record ==
Record by Year
Year	Coach	Record	Conference	NCAA
1915–16	Charles Mayser	1-1		
1916–17	Charles Mayser	2-0		
1917–18	Charles Mayser	1-1		
1918–19	Charles Mayser	3-0		
1919–20	Charles Mayser	5-1		
1920–21	Charles Mayser	7-1		
1921–22	Charles Mayser	8-0		
1922–23	Charles Mayser	8-0		
1923–24	Hugo Otopalik	9-0	2nd	
1924–25	Hugo Otopalik	6-0	2nd	
1925–26	Hugo Otopalik	8-1	2nd	
1926–27	Hugo Otopalik	8-1	2nd	
1927–28	Hugo Otopalik	7-2	2nd	2nd
1928–29	Hugo Otopalik	7-1	1st	4th
1929–30	Hugo Otopalik	6-3	2nd	4th
1930–31	Hugo Otopalik	9-1	2nd	2nd
1931–32	Hugo Otopalik	6-1	2nd	3rd
1932–33	Hugo Otopalik	6-1	1st	1st
1933–34	Hugo Otopalik	8-2	2nd	DNP
1934–35	Hugo Otopalik	4-3	2nd	DNP
1935–36	Hugo Otopalik	4-2-2	2nd	DNP
1936–37	Hugo Otopalik	6-2-1	1st	10th
1937–38	Hugo Otopalik	8-0	2nd	11th
1938–39	Hugo Otopalik	3-3	2nd	DNP
1939–40	Hugo Otopalik	4-4	2nd	9th
1940–41	Hugo Otopalik	7-3	1st	13th
1941–42	Hugo Otopalik	3-3		DNP
1942–43	Hugo Otopalik	1–3		DNP
1943–44	No season due to World War II			
1944–45	No season due to World War II			
1945–46	No season due to World War II			
1946–47	Hugo Otopalik	4-3	1st	8th
1947–48	Hugo Otopalik	5-5-1	3rd	9th
1948–49	Hugo Otopalik	2-6-1	3rd	14th
1949–50	Hugo Otopalik	4–6	3rd	DNP
1950–51	Hugo Otopalik	5-5	3rd	DNP
1951–52	Hugo Otopalik	6-2	2nd	DNP
1952–53	Hugo Otopalik	9-1	2nd	19th
1953–54	Dr. Harold Nichols	8-0	2nd	DNP
1954–55	Dr. Harold Nichols	7-1	2nd	DNP
1955–56	Dr. Harold Nichols	8-3	2nd	21st
1956–57	Dr. Harold Nichols	9-3-1	2nd	3rd
1957–58	Dr. Harold Nichols	10-0-2	1st	2nd
1958–59	Dr. Harold Nichols	11-3	2nd	2nd
1959–60	Dr. Harold Nichols	12-3	3rd	2nd
1960–61	Dr. Harold Nichols	13-1-2	3rd	3rd
1961–62	Dr. Harold Nichols	12-1-1	3rd	30th
1962–63	Dr. Harold Nichols	13-1	3rd	2nd
1963–64	Dr. Harold Nichols	13-0-1	2nd	3rd
1964–65	Dr. Harold Nichols	14-1	2nd	1st
1965–66	Dr. Harold Nichols	13-2	3rd	2nd
1966–67	Dr. Harold Nichols	12-3-1	2nd	3rd
1967–68	Dr. Harold Nichols	12-3	3rd	2nd
1968–69	Dr. Harold Nichols	15-1	3rd	1st
1969–70	Dr. Harold Nichols	15-2	1st	1st

Record by Year
Year	Coach	Record	Conference	NCAA
1970–71	Dr. Harold Nichols	17-0	2nd	2nd
1971–72	Dr. Harold Nichols	16-1	2nd	1st
1972–73	Dr. Harold Nichols	18-1	2nd	1st
1973–74	Dr. Harold Nichols	13-5	3rd	4th
1974–75	Dr. Harold Nichols	16-2-2	3rd	4th
1975–76	Dr. Harold Nichols	19-2	1st	2nd
1976–77	Dr. Harold Nichols	18-2-1	1st	1st
1977–78	Dr. Harold Nichols	19-2	2nd	2nd
1978–79	Dr. Harold Nichols	18-3	1st	2nd
1979–80	Dr. Harold Nichols	18-4	1st	3rd
1980–81	Dr. Harold Nichols	19-2	2nd	3rd
1981–82	Dr. Harold Nichols	17-2	1st	2nd
1982–83	Dr. Harold Nichols	14-4	2nd	3rd
1983–84	Dr. Harold Nichols	13-7	2nd	7th
1984–85	Dr. Harold Nichols	20-7	3rd	3rd
1985–86	Jim Gibbons	19-1	2nd	4th
1986–87	Jim Gibbons	14-3	1st	1st
1987–88	Jim Gibbons	17-4	2nd	3rd
1988–89	Jim Gibbons	8-9-1	2nd	3rd
1989–90	Jim Gibbons	14-9	4th	9th
1990–91	Jim Gibbons	13-3	2nd	5th
1991–92	Jim Gibbons	13-3	2nd	4th
1992–93	Bobby Douglas	13-4	2nd	6th
1993–94	Bobby Douglas	7-7	4th	10th
1994–95	Bobby Douglas	17-4	4th	14th
1995–96	Bobby Douglas	12-6-1	4th	2nd
1996–97	Bobby Douglas	10-7-1	2nd	4th
1997–98	Bobby Douglas	12-8	4th	6th
1998–99	Bobby Douglas	20-5-1	3rd	4th
1999-00	Bobby Douglas	20-2	2nd	2nd
2000–01	Bobby Douglas	19-4	3rd	6th
2001–02	Bobby Douglas	17-5	3rd	2nd
2002–03	Bobby Douglas	8–10	5th	19th
2003–04	Bobby Douglas	16-4	3rd	6th
2004–05	Bobby Douglas	16-2	2nd	10th
2005–06	Bobby Douglas	11-7	4th	13th
2006–07	Cael Sanderson	13-3	1st	2nd
2007–08	Cael Sanderson	16-4	1st	5th
2008–09	Cael Sanderson	15-3	1st	3rd
2009–10	Kevin Jackson	13-2	2nd	3rd
2010–11	Kevin Jackson	9–10	5th	20th
2011–12	Kevin Jackson	4–14	4th	35th
2012–13	Kevin Jackson	11-5	2nd	11th
2013–14	Kevin Jackson	9-7	3rd	12th
2014–15	Kevin Jackson	11-2	2nd	14th
2015–16	Kevin Jackson	10-6	3rd	12th
2016-17	Kevin Jackson	1-12	6th	57th
2017-18	Kevin Dresser	8-10	7th	45th
2018-19	Kevin Dresser	10-4	2nd	16th
2019-20	Kevin Dresser	10-5	2nd	Canceled
2020-21	Kevin Dresser	9-3	3rd	13th
2021-22	Kevin Dresser	15-1	3rd	17th
2022-23	Kevin Dresser	16-3	3rd	11th
2023-24	Kevin Dresser	13-2	1st	4th

== Award winners ==
=== Hall of Fame ===
- National Wrestling Hall of Fame Distinguished Members

Hugo Otopalik (1976)
Charles Mayser (1977)
Glen Brand (1978)
Dr. Harold Nichols (1978)
Dan Gable (1980)
Ben Peterson (1986)
Bobby Douglas (1987)
Dick Barker (1991)
Nate Carr (2003)
Kevin Jackson (2003)
Les Anderson (2004)
Larry Hayes (2004)
Cael Sanderson (2011)
Chris Taylor (2012)
Jake Varner (2022)

- FILA Hall of Fame

Kevin Jackson (2005)

=== Individual ===
- Dan Hodge Trophy

Cael Sanderson (2000)
Cael Sanderson (2001)
Cael Sanderson (2002)

- NCAA Outstanding Wrestler Award

Ron Gray (1959)
Dan Gable (1969)
Tim Krieger (1989)
Cael Sanderson (1999)
Cael Sanderson (2000)
Cael Sanderson (2001)
Cael Sanderson (2002)

- NCAA Gorriaran Award

Tom Peckham (1966)
Dan Gable (1969)
Dan Gable (1970)
Chris Taylor (1973)
Johnnie Jones (1977)
Darryl Peterson (1985)
Eric Voelker (1988)
Matt Johnson (1991)

- Big Eight Male Athlete of the Year

Tim Krieger (1989)
Chris Taylor (1973)

- Big 12 Male Athlete of the Year

Cael Sanderson (2002)

- Big 12 Scholar Athlete of the Year

Kyven Gadson (2015)
David Carr (2024)

=== Coaching ===
- NWCA Coach of the Year

Dr. Harold Nichols (1958)
Dr. Harold Nichols (1965)
Dr. Harold Nichols (1972)
Jim Gibbons (1987)
Bobby Douglas (2000)
Cael Sanderson (2007)
Kevin Dresser (2019)

- Big Eight Coach of the Year

Jim Gibbons (1989)
Jim Gibbons (1991)

- Big 12 Coach of the Year

Bobby Douglas (1999)
Bobby Douglas (2000)
Cael Sanderson (2007)
Kevin Dresser (2019)
Kevin Dresser (2024)

== Olympians ==
Iowa State wrestlers in the Olympics
Year	Name	Country	Style	Weight Class	Place
1928 Amsterdam	Arthur Holding	United States	Greco-Roman	58 kg	ALT
1932 Los Angeles	Robert Hess	United States	Freestyle	79 kg	4th
1948 London	Glen Brand	United States	Freestyle	79 kg	Gold
1956 Melbourne	Kent Townley	United States	Greco-Roman	57 kg	8th
1968 Mexico City	Tom Peckham	United States	Freestyle	87 kg	4th
1972 Munich	Dan Gable	United States	Freestyle	68 kg	Gold
1972 Munich	Ben Peterson	United States	Freestyle	90 kg	Gold
1972 Munich	Chris Taylor	United States	Freestyle	+100 kg	Bronze
1972 Munich	Bob Buzzard	United States	Greco-Roman	68 kg	DNP
1972 Munich	Chris Taylor	United States	Greco-Roman	+100 kg	DNP
1976 Montreal	Ben Peterson	United States	Freestyle	90 kg	Silver
1976 Montreal	Mike Farina	United States	Greco-Roman	48 kg	8th
1980 Moscow	Ben Peterson	United States	Freestyle	90 kg	Boycott
1988 Seoul	Nate Carr	United States	Freestyle	68 kg	Bronze
1992 Barcelona	Kevin Jackson	United States	Freestyle	82 kg	Gold
2004 Athens	Cael Sanderson	United States	Freestyle	84 kg	Gold
2012 London	Jake Varner	United States	Freestyle	96 kg	Gold

== Notable Iowa State wrestlers ==
- Carl Adams – two-time NCAA Champion and three-time All-American
- Chris Bono – three-time US freestyle World team member, NCAA champion and three-time All-American
- Glen Brand – Olympic gold medalist at 1948 Summer Olympics, NCAA Champion, two-time NCAA finalist and three-time All-American
- Bob Buzzard – Olympian at 1972 Summer Olympics in Greco-Roman wrestling, two-time NCAA All-American
- David Carr – Junior World Champion in freestyle wrestling, two-time NCAA Champion and five-time All-American
- Nate Carr – Olympic bronze medalist at 1988 Summer Olympics in freestyle wrestling, three-time NCAA Champion
- Pat Downey – member of Team USA Freestyle World Team in 2019, NCAA All-American at ISU
- Dan Gable – Olympic gold medalist at 1972 Summer Olympics in freestyle wrestling, World Champion in 1971, two-time NCAA Champion and three-time finalist, led Iowa Hawkeyes to 15 NCAA Team Championships as head coach
- Kyven Gadson – NCAA Champion and three-time All-American
- Kevin Jackson – Olympic gold medalist at 1992 Summer Olympics in freestyle wrestling, two-time World Champion, NCAA finalist at ISU
- Travis Paulson – member of Team USA Freestyle World Team in 2010, three-time NCAA All-American
- Tom Peckham – Olympian in freestyle wrestling at 1968 Summer Olympics, two-time NCAA Champion and three-time All-American
- Ben Peterson – Olympic gold medalist at 1972 Summer Olympics in freestyle wrestling, silver medalist at 1976 Summer Olympics, two-time NCAA Champion
- Cael Sanderson – Olympic gold medalist at 2004 Summer Olympics in freestyle wrestling, World silver medalist in 2003, four-time undefeated NCAA Champion, only wrestler in NCAA Division I history to go undefeated with more than 100 wins (159–0)
- Chris Taylor – Olympic bronze medalist at 1972 Summer Olympics in freestyle wrestling, two-time NCAA Champion
- Mike van Arsdale – former MMA fighter, NCAA Champion and three-time All-American
- Jake Varner – Olympic gold medalist at 2012 Summer Olympics, World bronze medalist in 2011, two-time NCAA Champion and four-time finalist
- David Zabriskie – NCAA Champion and three-time All-American

== See also ==
- Iowa State Cyclones
- National Wrestling Hall of Fame and Museum
- Glen Brand Wrestling Hall of Fame of Iowa
