= Kevin Jackson =

American wrestler and coach (born 1964)

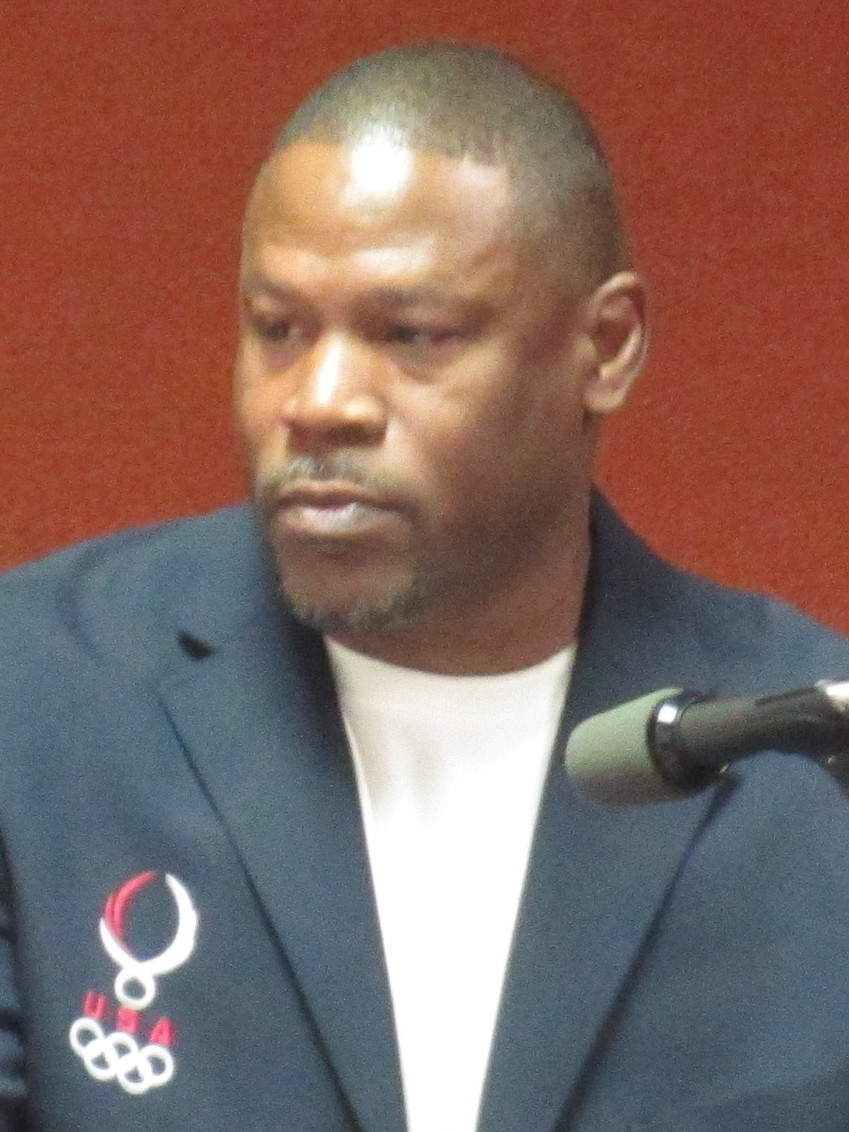
- Jackson in 2011
- Weight: 82 kg (181 lb)
- Born: November 25, 1964 (age 61); Highland Falls, New York, U.S.
- High school: Lansing Eastern (MI)
- State championships: 2 (Michigan)
- College: Iowa State University
- NCAA championships: 1 Team Championship
- Status: Head Development Coach at Olympic Training Center, Former Coach of Iowa State University
- Martial arts career
- Height: 5 ft 10 in (1.78 m)
- Weight: 199 lb (90 kg; 14.2 st)

Mixed martial arts record
- Total: 6
- Wins: 4
- By knockout: 1
- By submission: 3
- Losses: 2
- By submission: 2

Other information
- Mixed martial arts record from Sherdog
Medal record
Men's freestyle wrestling
Representing the United States
Olympic Games
Gold medal – first place	1992 Barcelona	82 kg
World Championships
Gold medal – first place	1991 Varna	82 kg
Gold medal – first place	1995 Atlanta	82 kg
Pan American Games
Gold medal – first place	1991 Havana	82 kg
Gold medal – first place	1995 Mar del Plata	82 kg
Collegiate Wrestling
NCAA Division I Championships
Representing the Iowa State Cyclones
Silver medal – second place	1987 College Park	167 lb
Representing the LSU Tigers
Bronze medal – third place	1983 Oklahoma City	158 lb
Bronze medal – third place	1984 East Rutherford	158 lb

Kevin Andre Jackson (born November 25, 1964) is an American retired freestyle and folkstyle wrestler and mixed martial artist. Following his competitive career, Jackson became a wrestling coach.

During his international career, Jackson became an Olympic Gold medalist in 1992, a two-time world champion (1991 and 1995), a three-time World Cup gold medalist (1993, 1995, and 1997; bronze in 1994), a two-time Pan American Games gold medalist (1991 and 1995), and a two-time Pan American champion (1990 and 1991). In folkstyle, Jackson was a four-time NCAA Division I All-American, thrice for the LSU Tigers and once for the Iowa State Cyclones, after Louisiana State University dropped its wrestling program. He also stepped into the UFC Octagon in four occasions, winning his first two bouts and losing the next two, all via submission. After spending the last four years as USA Wrestling's National Freestyle Developmental Coach, Jackson made the move to Ann Arbor, MI to serve as an Assistant Wrestling Coach for the University of Michigan.

== Biography ==
=== High school ===
The native of Lansing, Michigan, won two state high school championships for Eastern High School before becoming a Junior National Greco-Roman wrestling champion.

=== College ===
As a college wrestler, he attended LSU and earned All-America honors three times before the school dropped the sport. He transferred to Iowa State for his senior year and captained the Cyclones' last NCAA championship team (1987), earning another All-America award with an NCAA runner-up finish and registering a 30-3-1 record.

== Career ==
In 1992 he won an Olympic gold medal in wrestling and was invited to join "Team Foxcatcher", but was let go the next year when John du Pont started getting paranoid delusions and did not want anything black in his estate, from cars to horses to people. Soon after, Jackson won two Pan American Games titles and was a member of World Championship teams for the United States in both 1993 and 1995. He won three U.S. National Titles and placed second five times. Jackson also became the first American to win the prestigious Takhti Cup (1998) in Tehran, Iran. During his post-collegiate competitive career, Jackson also assisted with the Cyclone Wrestling Club (1989–92) and volunteered with the Arizona State (1997) program.

Jackson participated in mixed martial arts in 1997, when he joined the Ultimate Fighting Championship to become only the 2nd Olympic Gold medalist wrestler to step in the octagon, eventually winning the UFC 14 Light Heavyweight tournament. He fought Frank Shamrock for the inaugural UFC Light Heavyweight Championship at UFC Japan, but lost via armbar submission. He retired from MMA competition in 1998 after six fights.

Jackson's success earned him a number of major awards, including the 1995 John Smith Award as National Freestyle Wrestler of the Year, 1992 Amateur Wrestling News Man of the Year and 1991 USA Wrestling and USOC Wrestler of the Year. Jackson is a member of the FILA International Wrestling Hall of Fame, the National Wrestling Hall of Fame (as a Distinguished Member) and the Iowa State University Athletics Hall of Fame. In October 2019, Jackson was inducted into the LSU Hall of Fame and is the only wrestler to be inducted.

Jackson has worked extensively as a wrestling coach. He was the freestyle coach at the Olympic Training Center and head coach for the U.S. Army team at Fort Carson (1998–2001) and was head coach of the Sunkist youth development program, National Freestyle coach for USA Wrestling for eight years (2001–08) and the freestyle wrestling coach for two United States' teams at the Olympics. Jackson served as head coach of Iowa State Cyclones from 2010 to 2017 where he coached 4 NCAA champions, 14 All-Americans, and 9 Big-12 Champions. In June 2017 Kevin went back to the Olympic Training Center as a US National Team Freestyle development coach and launched the Elite Accelerated Program (EAP).

== Championships and awards ==
- Ultimate Fighting Championship
  - UFC 14 Middleweight tournament winner
  - UFC Encyclopedia Awards
    - Submission of the Night (One time) vs. Tony Fryklund
- Wrestling Observer Newsletter
  - Fight of the Year (1998) vs. Jerry Bohlander on March 13

== Mixed martial arts record ==
Professional record breakdown
6 matches	4 wins	2 losses
By knockout	1	0
By submission	3	2

Res.	Record	Opponent	Method	Event	Date	Round	Time	Location	Notes
Win	4–2	Sam Adkins	Submission (armbar)	Extreme Challenge 18	May 15, 1998	1	4:21	Davenport, Iowa, United States	
Loss	3–2	Jerry Bohlander	Technical Submission (armbar)	UFC 16	March 13, 1998	1	10:23	Kenner, Louisiana, United States	Fight of the Year (1998).
Loss	3–1	Frank Shamrock	Submission (armbar)	UFC Japan	December 21, 1997	1	0:16	Yokohama, Japan	For the inaugural UFC Light Heavyweight Championship.
Win	3–0	Tony Fryklund	Submission (rear-naked choke)	UFC 14	July 27, 1997	1	0:44	Birmingham, Alabama, United States	Won the UFC 14 Light Heavyweight Tournament.
Win	2–0	Todd Butler	TKO (submission to punches)	UFC 14	July 27, 1997	1	1:27	Birmingham, Alabama, United States	
Win	1–0	John Lober	Submission (arm-triangle choke)	Extreme Fighting 4	March 28, 1997	2	1:12	Des Moines, Iowa, United States	
