= 1939 NCAA wrestling championships =

American collegiate wrestling tournament

1939 NCAA Wrestling Championships
Tournament information
- Sport: College wrestling
- Location: Lancaster, Pennsylvania
- Dates: March 17, 1939–March 18, 1939
- Host(s): Franklin & Marshall College
- Venue(s): Mayser Physical Education Center

Final positions
- Champions: Oklahoma A&M (10th title)
- 1st runners-up: Lehigh
- 2nd runners-up: Illinois
- MVP: Dale Hanson (Minnesota)

The 1939 NCAA Wrestling Championships were the 12th NCAA Wrestling Championships to be held. Franklin & Marshall College in Lancaster, Pennsylvania hosted the tournament at the Mayser Physical Education Center.

Oklahoma A&M took home the team championship with 33 points and having three individual champions.

Dale Hanson of Minnesota was named the Outstanding Wrestler.

== Team results ==
Rank	School	Points
1	Oklahoma A&M	33
2	Lehigh	12
3	Illinois	11
T-4	Minnesota	9
T-4	Michigan	9
T-4	Indiana	9
T-4	Franklin & Marshall	9
8	Penn State	5
9	City College of New York	4
10	Appalachian State Teachers College	3

== Individual finals ==
Weight class	Championship match (champion in boldface)
121 lbs	**Joe McDaniel**, Oklahoma A&M DEC Frank Burgess, Franklin & Marshall
128 lbs	**Dale Hanson**, Minnesota DEC Woodrow Rorex, Oklahoma A&M
136 lbs	**Archie Deutschman**, Illinois DEC Joe Roman, Indiana
145 lbs	**Harold Nichols**, Michigan DEC OT Joe Scalzo, Penn State
155 lbs	**Stanley Henson**, Oklahoma A&M DEC William Combs, Michigan
165 lbs	**Henry Matthes**, Lehigh DEC Boyd Nelson, Oklahoma A&M
175 lbs	**Chris Traicoff**, Indiana DEC OT Henry Wittenberg, City College of New York
UNL	**Johnny Harrell**, Oklahoma A&M WBF John Sikich, Illinois
