= Chris Bono =

American wrestler and coach (born 1974)

Personal information
- Born: February 13, 1974 (age 52) Philadelphia, Pennsylvania, U.S.
- Home town: Jacksonville, Florida, U.S.

Sport
- Country: United States
- Sport: Wrestling
- Events: Freestyle and Folkstyle
- College team: Iowa State Cyclones
- Club: Sunkist Kids Wrestling Club
- Team: USA
Medal record
Men's freestyle wrestling
Representing the United States
Pan American Championships
Bronze medal – third place	1997 San Juan	69 kg
Bronze medal – third place	2003 Maracaibo	66 kg
Bronze medal – third place	2008 Colorado Springs	66 kg
Collegiate Wrestling
Representing the Iowa State Cyclones
NCAA Division I Championships
Gold medal – first place	1996 Minneapolis	150 lb
Silver medal – second place	1997 Cedar Falls	150 lb

Chris Bono
Current position
- Title: Head coach
- Team: Wisconsin
- Conference: Big Ten
- Record: 50–35 (.588)

Biographical details
- Education: Iowa State

Coaching career (HC unless noted)
- 1997–2005: Iowa State (assistant)
- 2005–2009: Chattanooga
- 2009: Iowa State (assistant)
- 2012–2018: South Dakota State
- 2018–present: Wisconsin

Accomplishments and honors

Awards
- Big 12 Coach of the Year (2017); 3x SoCon Coach of the Year (2007–2009)

Christopher Mark Bono (born February 13, 1974) is an American former freestyle and folkstyle wrestler. He was a three-time U.S. World team member in freestyle wrestling and an NCAA wrestling champion at Iowa State. Bono would later become a collegiate wrestling head coach, where he is the current head wrestling coach at Wisconsin.

== Early life ==
Bono was born in Philadelphia, Pennsylvania, where he started wrestling at the age of 5, following the footsteps of his older brother, Ernie. His family moved to Florida when he was in the 4th grade. In 7th grade, he made the varsity team at The Bolles School in Jacksonville, Florida. He was a three-time Florida high school wrestling state champion. Bono was also a Cadet national runner-up and Junior national All-American in freestyle wrestling.

== College career ==
In college, Bono was a three-time NCAA wrestling All-American and won the 1996 NCAA championship at 150-pounds at Iowa State.

== International career ==
On the senior level circuit, Bono would make three U.S. freestyle World Championship teams in 2001, 2002 and 2005 and was a four-time freestyle national champion.

== Coaching career ==
Bono became the 16th UW wrestling head coach when he was hired on March 24, 2018.

Prior to Wisconsin, Bono served as the head coach at South Dakota State and UT Chattanooga. Bono left South Dakota State with 64–41 overall record, a total of 24 NCAA qualifiers, five All-Americans and one national champion from 2012 to 2018.

At Chattanooga, he led the Mocs to three Southern Conference titles, coaching two All-Americans and 19 NCAA qualifiers from 2006 to 2009.

== Personal life ==
He has two daughters with his wife Niki.
