= Rico Chiapparelli =

American sport wrestler

Medal record

Men's freestyle wrestling

Representing the United States

World Cup
Gold medal – first place	1989 Toledo	82 kg

Collegiate Wrestling

Representing the Iowa Hawkeyes

NCAA Division I Championships
Gold medal – first place	1987 College Park	177 lb

Big Ten Championships
Gold medal – first place	1985 Evanston	177 lb
Gold medal – first place	1986 Minneapolis	177 lb
Gold medal – first place	1987 Madison	177 lb

Rico Chiapparelli is an American former wrestler and mixed martial arts trainer. Being from Baltimore, Maryland, Chiapparelli became known as the "Baltimore Butcher." He attended Mount Saint Joseph High School in Baltimore, where he was a Junior National Champion as a senior. Chiapparelli then attended the University of Iowa, where he was a standout wrestler. While at Iowa, he was an NCAA National Champion in 1987 at 177 lbs. After college, he competed in freestyle wrestling in the men's senior level, and went on to become the USAW National Champion in 1989 at 180.5 lbs.

He would make himself famous in MMA by founding the team Real American Wrestling. Currently, Chiapparelli is a mixed martial arts, submission wrestling, and wrestling instructor.

== Mixed martial arts career ==
Having trained Brazilian jiu-jitsu under Renzo Gracie, Chiapparelli got into MMA when he was asked by his friend and wrestling colleague Tom Erikson to corner him in his debut for the 1996's MARS tournament. Though his participation on the event cost him his relationship with Gracie, after learning of the business and the value of wrestling in the sport, Chiapparelli formed the team RAW or Real American Wrestling. It was soon joined by Erikson, Dan Henderson, Randy Couture, Frank Trigg and Vladimir Matyushenko, among others.

Chiapparelli had his first and only MMA match on September 13, 2003, beating Luiz Pantera in the Jungle Fight promotion in Brazil.

== Mixed martial arts record ==
Professional record breakdown
1 match	1 win	0 losses
By knockout	0	0
By submission	0	0
By decision	1	0
Draws	0	
No contests	0	

Res.	Record	Opponent	Method	Event	Date	Round	Time	Location	Notes
Win	1-0	Luiz Pantera	Decision (unanimous)	Jungle Fight 1	September 13, 2003	3	5:00	Manaus, Amazonas, Brazil	
