= 1987 NCAA Division I Wrestling Championships =

American collegiate wrestling tournament

Tournament information
- Sport: College wrestling
- Location: College Park, Maryland
- Dates: March 19, 1987–March 21, 1987
- Host: University of Maryland
- Venue: Cole Field House

Final positions
- Champions: Iowa State (8th title)
- 1st runners-up: Iowa
- 2nd runners-up: Penn State
- MVP: John Smith (Oklahoma State)

The 1987 NCAA Division I Wrestling Championships were the 57th NCAA Division I Wrestling Championships to be held. The University of Maryland in College Park, Maryland hosted the tournament at Cole Field House.

Iowa State took home the team championship with 133 points and four individual champions.

John Smith of Oklahoma State was named the Most Outstanding Wrestler and Lenny Bernstein of North Carolina received the Gorriaran Award.

== Team results ==
| Rank | School | Points |
|---|---|---|
| 1 | Iowa State | 133 |
| 2 | Iowa | 108 |
| 3 | Penn State | 97.75 |
| 4 | Oklahoma State | 85.25 |
| 5 | Bloomsburg | 47.25 |
| 6 | Clarion | 46 |
| 7 | North Carolina | 42.75 |
| 8 | Edinboro | 38.25 |
| 9 | Arizona State | 35.75 |
| 10 | Lehigh | 32.35 |

== Individual finals ==
| Weight class | Championship match (champion in boldface) |
|---|---|
| 118 lbs | **Ricky Bonomo**, Bloomsburg DEC Jim Martin, Penn State, 8–4 |
| 126 lbs | **Bill Kelly**, Iowa State WBF Brad Penrith, Iowa, 6:31 |
| 134 lbs | **John Smith**, Oklahoma State MAJOR Gil Sanchez, Nebraska, 18–4 |
| 142 lbs | **Peter Yozzo**, Lehigh WBF Pat Santoro, Pittsburgh, 3:52 |
| 150 lbs | **Tim Krieger**, Iowa State DEC Jim Heffernan, Iowa |
| 158 lbs | **Stewart Carter**, Iowa State DEC Ken Haselrig, Clarion, 6–3 |
| 167 lbs | **Royce Alger**, Iowa DEC Kevin Jackson, Iowa State, 10–4 |
| 177 lbs | **Rico Chiapparelli**, Iowa DEC Darryl Pope, Cal State-Bakersfield, 5–2 |
| 190 lbs | **Eric Voelker**, Iowa State DEC Dave Dean, Minnesota, 4–3 |
| 275 lbs | **Carlton Haselrig**, Pittsburgh-Johnstown DEC Dean Hall, Edinboro, 4–2 |
