= Charles Mayser =

American football, baseball, and wrestling coach

Biographical details
- Born: June 3, 1876; Buffalo, New York, U.S.
- Died: July 14, 1967 (aged 91); Akron, Pennsylvania, U.S.

Coaching career (HC unless noted)

Football
- 1913–1914: Franklin & Marshall
- 1915–1919: Iowa State
- 1924–1925: Franklin & Marshall
- 1944–1945: Franklin & Marshall

Baseball
- 1919–1920: Iowa State

Wrestling
- 1916–1923: Iowa State
- 1924–1946: Franklin & Marshall

Administrative career (AD unless noted)
- 1919–1923: Iowa State
- 1923–1946: Franklin & Marshall

Head coaching record
- Overall: 46–32–5 (football); 18–8–1 (baseball)

Charles William Mayser (June 3, 1876 – July 14, 1967) was an American college football, college baseball, and wrestling coach. He served three stints as the head football coach at Franklin & Marshall College (1913–1914, 1924–1925, 1944–1945) and was the head football coach at Iowa State University from 1915 to 1919, compiling a career college football head coaching record of 46–32–5. Mayser was the head wrestling coach at Iowa State from 1916 to 1923 and at Franklin & Marshall from 1924 to 1946. He was also the head baseball coach at Iowa State for two seasons, from 1919 to 1920, tallying a mark of 18–8–1.

== Coaching career ==
=== Franklin & Marshall ===
Mayser served three two-years stints as the head football coach at Franklin & Marshall College: 1913 to 1914, 1924 to 1925, and 1944 to 1945. His record in six seasons was 25–21–3. Mayser also coached wrestling at Franklin & Marshall from 1924 to 1946.

=== Iowa State ===
Mayser was the tenth head football coach at Iowa State University and he held that position for five seasons, from 1915 until 1919. His career coaching record at Iowa state was 21–11–2. Iowa State had wanted to hire Charles Brickley as head coach in late 1914.

== Honors and death ==
Mayser was inducted into the Helms Foundation Wrestling Hall of Fame in 1958. He died at a nursing home in Akron, Pennsylvania on July 14, 1967.

== Head coaching record ==
=== Football ===
Year	Team	Overall	Conference	Standing	Bowl/playoffs
Franklin & Marshall (Independent) (1913–1914)
1913	Franklin & Marshall	6–2			
1914	Franklin & Marshall	6–2–1			
Iowa State Cyclones (Missouri Valley Intercollegiate Athletic Association) (1915–1919)
1915	Iowa State	6–2	2–1	3rd	
1916	Iowa State	5–2–1	2–1–1	3rd	
1917	Iowa State	5–2	3–1	T–2nd	
1918	Iowa State	0–3	NA	NA	
1919	Iowa State	5–2–1	3–1–1	2nd	
Iowa State:		21–11–2	10–4–2		
Franklin & Marshall (Independent) (1924–1925)
1924	Franklin & Marshall	3–5–1			
1925	Franklin & Marshall	5–4			
Franklin & Marshall Diplomats (Independent) (1944–1945)
1944	Franklin & Marshall	1–8			
1945	Franklin & Marshall	4–0–1			
Franklin & Marshall:		25–21–3			
Total:		46–32–5			

== See also ==
- List of college football head coaches with non-consecutive tenure
