= 1972 NCAA University Division Wrestling Championships =

American collegiate wrestling tournament

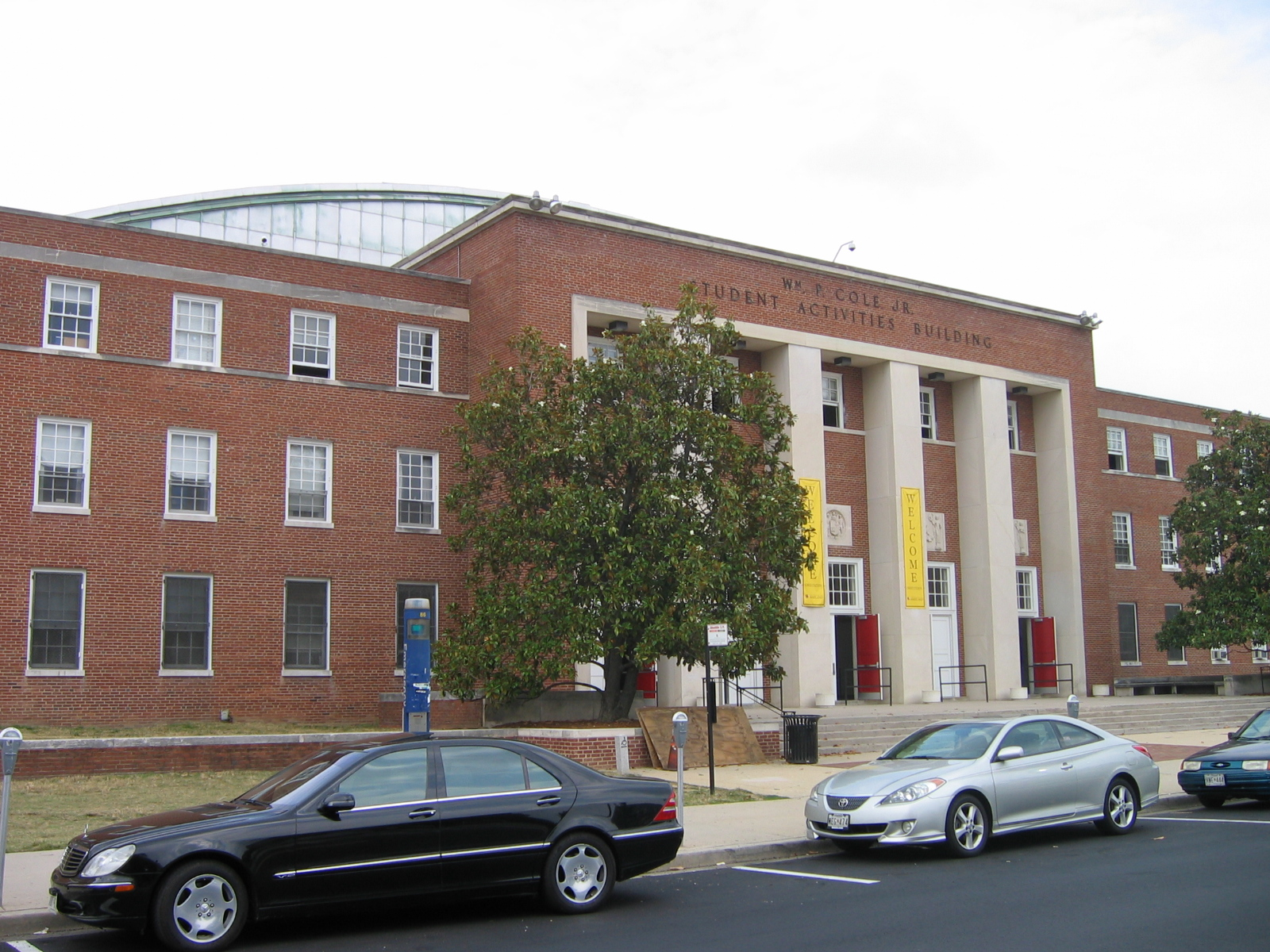
- Cole Field House at the University of Maryland, College Park.

Tournament information
- Sport: College wrestling
- Location: College Park, Maryland
- Dates: March 9, 1972–March 11, 1972
- Host(s): University of Maryland
- Venue(s): Cole Field House

Final positions
- Champions: Iowa State (5th title)
- 1st runners-up: Michigan State
- 2nd runners-up: Oklahoma State
- MVP: Wade Schalles (Clarion)

The 1972 NCAA University Division Wrestling Championships were the 42nd NCAA University Division Wrestling Championships to be held. The University of Maryland in College Park, Maryland hosted the tournament at Cole Field House.

Iowa State took home the team championship with 103 points and three individual champions.

Wade Schalles of Clarion was named the Most Outstanding Wrestler and John Panning of Minnesota received the Gorriaran Award.

== Team results ==
Rank	School	Points
1	Iowa State	103
2	Michigan State	72.5
3	Oklahoma State	57
4	Washington	54
5	Oklahoma	45.5
6	Oregon State	28
7	Penn State	26.5
T-9	Ohio	26
T-9	Navy	26

== Individual finals ==
Weight class	Championship Match (Champion in boldface)
118 lbs	**Greg Johnson**, Michigan State DEC Gary Breece, Oklahoma, 9-5
126 lbs	**Pat Milkovich**, Michigan State DEC Chris Quigley, Illinois State 4-2
134 lbs	**Gary Barton**, Clarion DEC Phil Parker, Iowa State, 9-6
142 lbs	**Tom Milkovich**, Michigan State DEC Larry Owings, Washington, 8-4
150 lbs	**Wade Schalles**, Clarion WBF Jarrett Hubbard, Michigan, 3:52
158 lbs	**Carl Adams**, Iowa State DEC Stan Dziedzic, Slippery Rock, 7-4
167 lbs	**Andy Matter**, Penn State DEC Keith Abens, Iowa State 6-2
177 lbs	**Bill Murdock**, Washington MAJOR John Panning, Minnesota, 10-1
190 lbs	**Ben Peterson**, Iowa State WDF Emil Deliere, Princeton, 1:53
UNL	**Chris Taylor**, Iowa State DEC Greg Wojciechowski, Toledo, 6-1
