= Bobby Douglas =

American wrestler and coach (1942–2026)

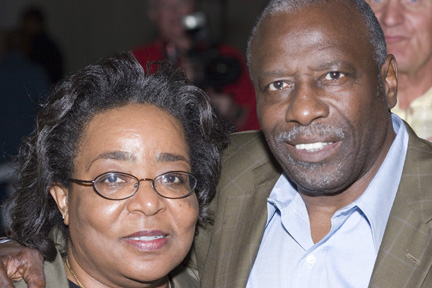
- Douglas and his wife Jackie in 2006

Personal information
- Born: Robert Edward Douglas; March 27, 1942 Bellaire, Ohio, U.S.
- Died: February 23, 2026 (aged 83) Ames, Iowa, U.S.
- Height: 5 ft 7 in (170 cm)
- Weight: 150 lb (68 kg)

Sport
- Country: United States
- Sport: Wrestling
- Events: Freestyle, Greco-Roman, and Folkstyle
- College team: Oklahoma State; West Liberty State
- Club: Michigan Wrestling Club
- Team: USA
- Coached by: Myron Roderick
Medal record
Men's freestyle wrestling
Representing the United States
World Championships
Silver medal – second place	1966 Toledo	63 kg
Bronze medal – third place	1970 Edmonton	68 kg
Men's collegiate wrestling
Representing West Liberty State
NAIA Championships
Gold medal – first place	1962 Winona	130 lb
NCAA Division I Championships
Silver medal – second place	1963 Kent	130 lb
Representing the Oklahoma State Cowboys
Big 8 Championships
Gold medal – first place	1965 Norman	147 lb

Robert Edward Douglas (March 27, 1942 – February 23, 2026) was an American freestyle wrestler and coach. He competed as a featherweight at the 1964 and 1968 Olympics and placed fourth in 1964. He won a silver and a bronze medal at the 1966 and 1970 world championships, respectively, and retired later in 1970. Douglas later coached several U.S Olympic teams, is one of only four collegiate coaches to win more than 400 dual meets, and won an NCAA team national title at Arizona State in 1988. His coaching accomplishments include 13 NCAA champions, 110 All-America performances, and 68 conference titles.

Douglas added to his legacy by coaching Cael Sanderson to a gold medal in the 185-pound weight class at the 2004 Olympics in Athens, Greece. Douglas was named the 2004 USA Wrestling Freestyle Coach of the Year. In January 2005, Douglas was honored with the Edward Clark Gallagher Award, presented annually to the Oklahoma State University wrestling alumnus who exemplifies the spirit and leadership eminent in the tradition of champions. He also received the 2005 Iowa State Alumni Association Impact Award.

In 1968, Douglas defeated Dan Gable 11–1 in a freestyle wrestling match during the Olympic Trials in Ames, Iowa while Gable's only defeat in folkstyle wrestling in high school and college came in the NCAA finals of his senior year at Iowa State in 1970 to Larry Owings. Douglas was inducted into the NAIA Hall of Fame in 1985, the National Wrestling Hall of Fame as a Distinguished Member in 1987, the Arizona Wrestling Hall of Fame in 1999, the Dan Brands Hall of Fame in 2002, and the Ovac Hall of Fame in 2004. In his career, he has coached many Olympians who placed in the top three in the world. He coached the Iowa State wrestling team for many years before stepping down in favor of Cael Sanderson in 2006.

== Early life ==
Robert Edward Douglas was born in Bellaire, Ohio, on March 27, 1942. His father was in prison when Bobby was born. After his mother was left an invalid in an automobile accident, and further disabled after being raped and stabbed in a home invasion, he was raised by his maternal grandparents in Blaine, Ohio.

== Competitive career ==
At Bridgeport High School he wrestled, played running back in football, and played baseball. Douglas rose to the top in wrestling by capturing the Ohio 112-pound weight class crown in 1959 as a sophomore. He also won the 127-pound title as a senior. Though Douglas is often credited with being the first black Ohio high school state titlist, the honor rightly belongs to a 145-pound senior from John Adams named Ludie Graddy, who beat Euclid's Bill Murphy, 4–3, in the state championship match in 1958.

Douglas began his college wrestling career at nearby West Liberty State College, located across the Ohio River in West Virginia. He wrestled there for two years and captured an NAIA championship and was second in the NCAA Championships. He then transferred to Oklahoma State, where he won the Big Eight Conference 147-pound crown. The Cowboys never lost a dual meet with Douglas in the lineup, and captured a pair of conference championships and the 1964 NCAA team title.

On the senior level, Douglas captured five national championships and a pair of U.S. Olympic Trials titles. He had a fourth-place featherweight finish at the 1964 Olympics in Tokyo and captained the U.S. Olympic freestyle team at the 1968 Olympics in Mexico City. He won a silver and a bronze medal at the 1966 and 1970 world championships, respectively, and placed fourth in 1969. He was named the USA's outstanding wrestler in 1970, the year he retired. He accumulated a career record of 303–17–7 (.953) from his high school days through his World Championship competition.

== Personal life and death ==
Douglas earned a bachelor's degree from Oklahoma State in 1967 and a master's degree from ASU in 1981, where he was admitted to the doctoral program. Douglas and his wife, Jackie, had one son, Bobby Douglas Jr., and resided in Ames, Iowa.

Bobby Douglas died in Ames, Iowa, on February 23, 2026, at the age of 83.

== Honors ==
In 1987, Douglas was inducted into the National Wrestling Hall of Fame, following his enshrinement into the NAIA Wrestling Hall of Fame in 1985. Douglas was also a member of the Ohio Hall of Fame, and in 1999 was inducted into the Arizona State Hall of Fame. He was a supporter of the Jason Foundation, a youth suicide awareness and prevention foundation.

Douglas was one of the great technicians in the sport. He has written several books on wrestling technique: Takedown I, Takedown II, Pinning and Olympic Technique, Take It To The Mat, Wrestling Skills and Drills, and The Last Takedown. He was one of a handful of gold certified U.S. coaches.
