= 1977 NCAA Division I Wrestling Championships =

American collegiate wrestling tournament

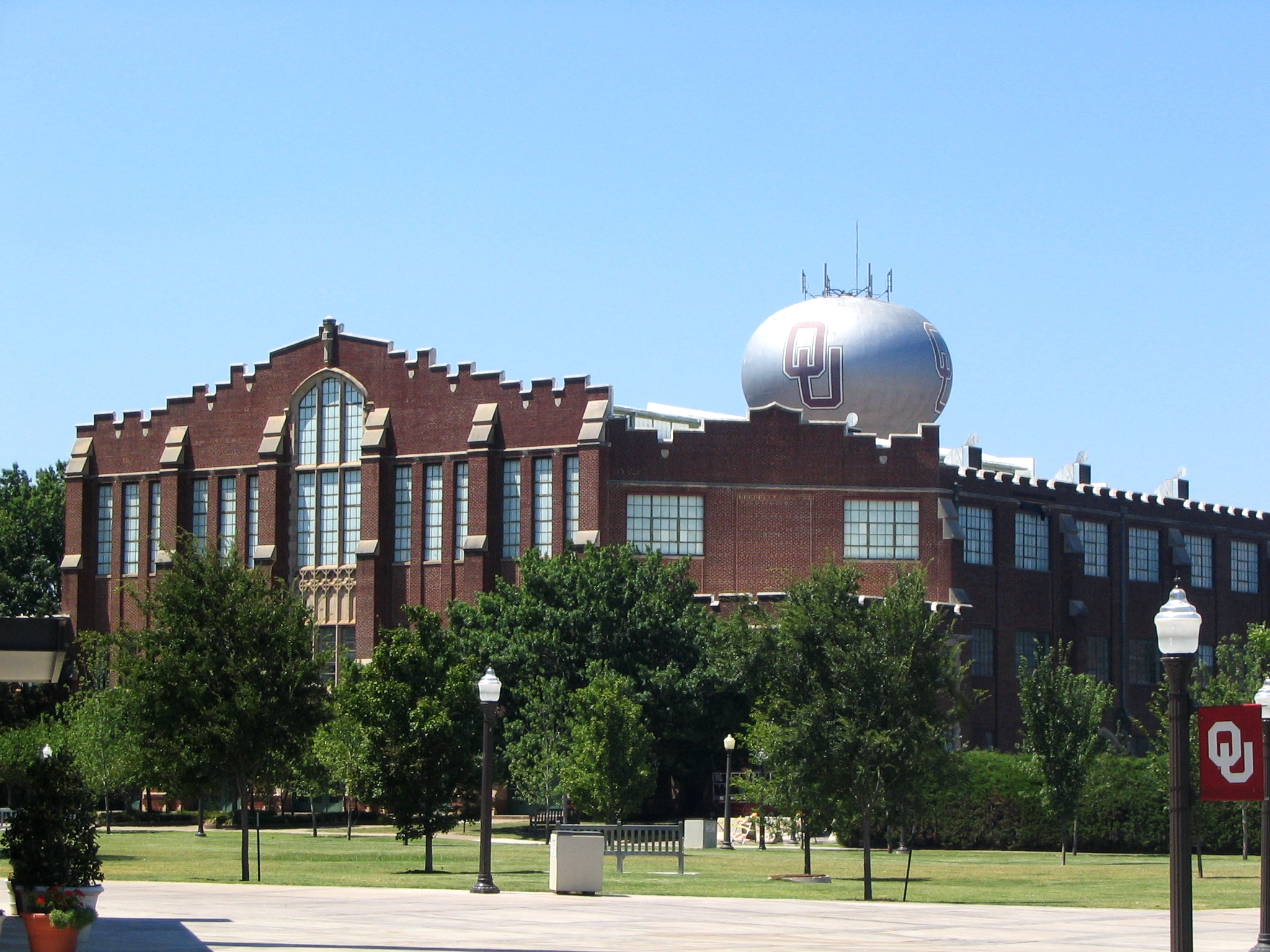
- McCasland Field House, where the tournament was hosted

Tournament information
- Sport: College wrestling
- Location: Norman, Oklahoma
- Dates: March 17, 1977–March 19, 1977
- Host(s): University of Oklahoma
- Venue(s): McCasland Field House

Final positions
- Champions: Iowa State (7th title)
- 1st runners-up: Oklahoma State
- 2nd runners-up: Iowa
- MVP: Nick Gallo (Hofstra)

The 1977 NCAA Division I Wrestling Championships were the 47th NCAA Division I Wrestling Championships to be held. The University of Oklahoma in Norman, Oklahoma hosted the tournament at McCasland Field House.

Iowa State took home the team championship with 95.5 points and one individual champion.

Nick Gallo of Hofstra was named the Most Outstanding Wrestler and Johnnie Jones of Iowa State received the Gorriaran Award.

== Team results ==
Rank	School	Points
1	Iowa State	95.5
2	Oklahoma State	88.75
3	Iowa	84
4	Minnesota	66
5	Oregon State	52.25
6	Wisconsin	50.75
7	Oklahoma	49
8	Lehigh	48.75
9	Michigan	45.5
10	Kentucky	41.5

== Individual finals ==
Weight class	Championship match (champion in boldface)
118 lbs	**Jim Haines**, Wisconsin DEC Mike McArthur, Minnesota, 8–7
126 lbs	**Nick Gallo**, Hofstra DEC Keith Mourlam, Iowa, 8–3
134 lbs	**Pat Neu**, Minnesota DEF Dennis Brighton, Michigan State, 4–2
142 lbs	**Steve Barrett**, Oklahoma State DEC Sam Komar, Indiana, 12–5
150 lbs	**Mark Churella**, Michigan DEC Joe Zuspann, Iowa State, 9–3
158 lbs	**Lee Kemp**, Wisconsin DEC Kelly Ward, Iowa State, 9–5
167 lbs	**Rod Kilgore**, Oklahoma DEC Mark Lieberman, Lehigh, 4–2
177 lbs	**Chris Campbell**, Iowa DEC Mark Johnson, Michigan, 12–6
190 lbs	**Frank Santana**, Iowa State DEC Evan Johnson, Minnesota, 12–7
UNL	**Jimmy Jackson**, Oklahoma State DEC Larry Bielenberg, Oregon State
