= 1969 NCAA University Division wrestling championships =

American collegiate wrestling tournament

1969 NCAA University Division Wrestling Championships
Tournament information
- Sport: College wrestling
- Location: Provo, Utah
- Dates: March 27, 1969–March 29, 1969
- Host(s): Brigham Young
- Venue(s): Smith Fieldhouse

Final positions
- Champions: Iowa State (3rd title)
- 1st runners-up: Oklahoma
- 2nd runners-up: Oregon State
- MVP: Dan Gable (Iowa State)

The 1969 NCAA University Division Wrestling Championships were the 39th NCAA University Division Wrestling Championships to be held. Brigham Young in Provo, Utah hosted the tournament at Smith Fieldhouse.

Iowa State took home the team championship with 104 points and three individual champions.

Dan Gable of Iowa State received the Gorriaran Award as well as being named the Most Outstanding Wrestler.

== Team results ==
Rank	School	Points
1	Iowa State	99
2	Oklahoma	69
3	Oregon State	58
4	Michigan State	57
5	Cal Poly-SLO	52
6	Oklahoma State	51
7	Iowa	38
8	UCLA	28
9	Michigan	27
10	Temple	22

== Individual finals ==
Weight class	Championship match (Champion in boldface)
115 lbs	**John Miller**, Oregon DEC Sergio Gonzales, UCLA, 3–3, 1–0
123 lbs	**Wayne Boyd**, Temple WBF Stan Keeley, Oklahoma, 7:20
130 lbs	**David McGuire**, Oklahoma WBF Len Groom, Northern Colorado, 4:32
137 lbs	**Dan Gable**, Iowa State WBF Marty Willigan, Hofstra, 4:17
145 lbs	**Mike Grant**, Oklahoma DEC Ray Murphy, Oklahoma State, 5–4
152 lbs	**Gobel Kline**, Maryland DEC Rich Mihal, Iowa, 4–1
160 lbs	**Cleo McGlory**, Oklahoma DEC Dave Martin, Iowa State, 5–3
167 lbs	**Jason Smith**, Iowa State DEC John Woods, Cal Poly-SLO, 5–4
177 lbs	**Chuck Jean**, Iowa State WBF Pete Cornell, Michigan, 7:25
191 lbs	**Tom Kline**, Cal Poly SLO DEC Robert Grimes, San Diego State, 8–4
UNL	**Jess Lewis**, Oregon State DEC Jeff Smith, Michigan State, 6–1
