= 1965 NCAA University Division wrestling championships =

American collegiate wrestling tournament

1965 NCAA University Division Wrestling Championships
Tournament information
- Sport: College wrestling
- Location: Laramie, Wyoming
- Dates: March 25, 1965–March 27, 1965
- Host(s): University of Wyoming
- Venue(s): War Memorial Fieldhouse

Final positions
- Champions: Iowa State (2nd title)
- 1st runners-up: Oklahoma State
- 2nd runners-up: Lehigh
- MVP: Yojiro Uetake (Oklahoma State)

The 1965 NCAA University Division Wrestling Championships were the 35th NCAA University Division Wrestling Championships to be held. The University of Wyoming in Laramie, Wyoming hosted the tournament at War Memorial Fieldhouse.

Iowa State took home the team championship with 87 points and two individual champions.

Yojiro Uetake of Oklahoma State was named the Most Outstanding Wrestler and Charles Tribble of Arizona State received the Gorriaran Award.

== Team results ==
Rank	School	Points
1	Iowa State	87
2	Oklahoma State	86
3	Lehigh	45
4	Oklahoma	44
5	Michigan	39
6	Arizona State	30
T-7	Syracuse	17
T-7	Oregon State	17
9	Maryland	16
T-10	Wisconsin	15
T-10	Navy	15
T-10	Army	15

== Individual finals ==
Weight class	Championship Match (Champion in boldface)
115 lbs	**Tadaaki Hatta**, Oklahoma State DEC Glenn McMinn, Arizona State, 9-6
123 lbs	**Mike Caruso**, Lehigh DEC Bob Fehrs, Michigan, 8-5
130 lbs	**Yojiro Uetake**, Oklahoma State DEC Joe Peritore, Lehigh, 6-1
137 lbs	**Bill Stuart**, Lehigh, DEC Wayne Hicks, Navy
147 lbs	**Veryl Long**, Iowa State DEC Joe Bavaro, Gettysburg
157 lbs	**Bob Kopnisky**, Maryland DEC Bill Lam, Oklahoma, 5-4
167 lbs	**Greg Ruth**, Oklahoma DEC Len Kauffman, Oregon State, 10-6
177 lbs	**Tom Peckham**, Iowa State DEC Bill Harlow, Oklahoma State, 5-3
191 lbs	**Jack Brisco**, Oklahoma State WBF Dan Pernat, Wisconsin, 6:32
UNL	**Jim Nance**, Syracuse DEC Russ Winer, Oklahoma State, 5-3
