= Jess Lewis =

American football player and wrestler (born 1947)

No. 37
- Position: Linebacker

Personal information
- Born: July 28, 1947 (age 79); Aumsville, Oregon, U.S.
- Listed height: 6 ft 1 in (1.85 m)
- Listed weight: 230 lb (104 kg)

Career information
- High school: Cascade Senior (Turner, Oregon)
- College: Oregon State
- NFL draft: 1970: 13th round, 326th overall pick

Career history
- Houston Oilers (1970)

Awards and highlights
- First-team All-American (1967); 2× First-team All-Pac-8 (1967, 1969); Oregon Sports Hall of Fame (1981)
- Stats at Pro Football Reference

Medal record

Collegiate Wrestling

Representing the Oregon State Beavers

NCAA Division I Championships
Gold medal – first place	1969 Provo	Heavyweight
Gold medal – first place	1970 Evanston	Heavyweight
Silver medal – second place	1968 State College	Heavyweight

Jess Lewis (born July 28, 1947) is an American former amateur wrestler and professional football player. He played as a linebacker in the National Football League (NFL) for the Houston Oilers in 1970. He graduated from Cascade High School in Turner, Oregon.

== College wrestling ==
Lewis was an accomplished wrestler for Oregon State, becoming a three-time conference champion (1968–1970), three-time All-American (1968–1970), and a two-time NCAA champion (1969, 1970) in the heavyweight division. He went on to compete in the 1968 World University Games and the 1968 Summer Olympics as a wrestler for the United States.

== College football ==
Lewis also played college football at Oregon State University where he earned All-American honors as a football player in 1967, and was a two-time All-Pac-8 Conference selection as a defensive tackle. He was selected as the team MVP in 1969.

== NFL football ==
Upon graduating from Oregon State, Lewis was selected in the 13th round of the 1970 NFL draft by the Houston Oilers. The Oilers moved him to linebacker upon drafting him.
