= 1933 NCAA Wrestling Championships =

American collegiate wrestling tournament

Tournament information
- Sport: College wrestling
- Location: Bethlehem, Pennsylvania
- Dates: March 24, 1933–March 25, 1933
- Host(s): Lehigh
- Venue(s): Taylor Gymnasium

Final positions
- Champions: Unofficial; Iowa Agricultural College (1st title); Oklahoma A&M (5th title)
- MVP: Alan Kelley (Oklahoma A&M)

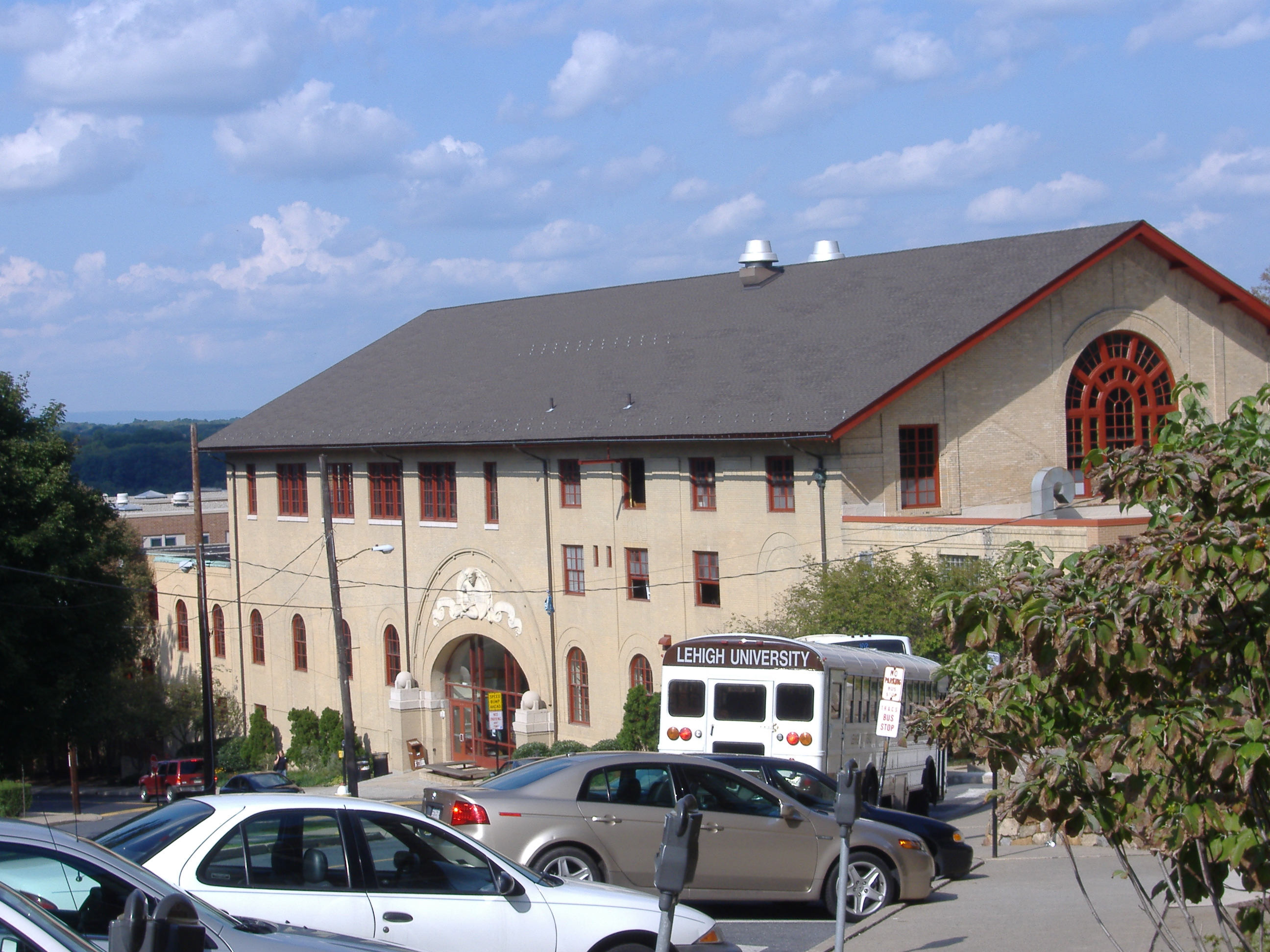
Taylor Gym at Lehigh University, where the championships took place

The 1933 NCAA Wrestling Championships were the 6th NCAA Wrestling Championships to be held. Lehigh in Bethlehem, Pennsylvania hosted the tournament at Taylor Gymnasium.

There were no official team ratings, however, with three champions each Iowa Agricultural College and Oklahoma A&M are cited as unofficial co-champions.

Alan Kelley of Oklahoma A&M was awarded the Outstanding Wrestler trophy. Pat Johnson of Harvard, who took third place, received an award for being runner-up in the OW voting.

== Individual finals ==
| Weight class | Championship match (champion in boldface) |
|---|---|
| 118 lbs | **Rex Peery**, Oklahoma A&M TA Joe Puerta, Illinois, 6:09 |
| 126 lbs | **Ross Flood**, Oklahoma A&M WBF Robert Emmons, Illinois, 3:40 |
| 135 lbs | **Patrick Devine**, Indiana WBF Roy Phillips, Franklin & Marshall 4:56 |
| 145 lbs | **Alan Kelley**, Oklahoma A&M WBF Foy Stout, Southwestern Oklahoma, 12:12 |
| 155 lbs | **Merrill Frevert**, Iowa Agricultural College TA Warren Landis, Virginia Military, 7:00 |
| 165 lbs | **George Martin**, Iowa Agricultural College WBF Pete Peck, Lehigh, 8:46 |
| 175 lbs | **Robert Hess**, Iowa Agricultural College WBF Richard Voliva, Indiana, 5:47 |
| UNL | **Ralph Teague**, Southwestern Oklahoma TA Robert Jones, Indiana, 7:28 |
