= 1973 NCAA University Division Wrestling Championships =

American collegiate wrestling tournament

1973 NCAA Division Wrestling Championships
Tournament information
- Sport: College wrestling
- Location: Seattle, Washington
- Dates: March 8, 1973–March 10, 1973
- Host(s): University of Washington
- Venue(s): Hec Edmundson Pavilion

Final positions
- Champions: Iowa State (6th title)
- 1st runners-up: Oregon State
- 2nd runners-up: Michigan
- MVP: Greg Strobel (Oregon State)

The 1973 NCAA University Division Wrestling Championships were the 43rd NCAA Division I Wrestling Championships to be held. The University of Washington in Seattle, Washington hosted the tournament at Hec Edmundson Pavilion.

Iowa State took home the team championship with 85 points and two individual champions.

Greg Strobel of Oregon State was named the Most Outstanding Wrestler and Chris Taylor of Iowa State received the Gorriaran Award.

== Team results ==
Rank	School	Points
1	Iowa State	85
2	Oregon State	72.5
3	Michigan	59.5
4	Brigham Young	43.5
5	Oklahoma State	42
6	Oklahoma	38
T-7	Iowa	34
T-7	Washington	34
9	Ohio	25.5
T-10	Penn State	24.5
T-10	Navy	24.5

== Individual finals ==
Weight class	Championship Match (Champion in boldface)
118 lbs	**Dan Sherman**, Iowa DEC Tom Phillips, Oregon State, 10-5
126 lbs	**Mark Massery**, Northwestern DEC Ron Glass, Iowa State 9-8
134 lbs	**Don Rohn**, Clarion DEC Bobby Stites, Oklahoma State 5-3
142 lbs	**Dan Muthler**, Navy DEC Reed Fehlberg, Brigham Young, 9-4
150 lbs	**Jarrett Hubbard**, Michigan DEC Rich Lawinger, Wisconsin, 8-4
158 lbs	**Wade Schalles**, Clarion DEC Mike R. Jones, Oregon State, 9-2
167 lbs	**Bill Simpson**, Clarion DEC Doug Wyn, Western Michigan, 7-3
177 lbs	**Rich Binek**, Iowa State DEC Gene Barber, The College of New Jersey, 8-3
190 lbs	**Greg Strobel**, Oregon State DEC Johnny Johnson, Northern Illinois, 11-7
UNL	**Chris Taylor**, Iowa State WBF Jim Hagen, Oregon State, 4:19
