= 1970 NCAA University Division Wrestling Championships =

American collegiate wrestling tournament

Tournament information
- Sport: College wrestling
- Location: Evanston, Illinois
- Dates: March 26, 1970–March 28, 1970
- Host(s): Northwestern University
- Venue(s): McGaw Memorial Hall

Final positions
- Champions: Iowa State (4th title)
- 1st runners-up: Michigan State
- 2nd runners-up: Oregon State
- MVP: Larry Owings (Washington)

The 1970 NCAA University Division Wrestling Championships were the 40th NCAA University Division Wrestling Championships to be held. Northwestern University in Evanston, Illinois hosted the tournament at McGaw Memorial Hall.

Iowa State took home the team championship with 99 points and three individual champions.

Larry Owings of Washington was named the Most Outstanding Wrestler and Dan Gable of Iowa State received the Gorriaran Award.

== Team results ==
| Rank | School | Points |
|---|---|---|
| 1 | Iowa State | 99 |
| 2 | Michigan State | 84 |
| 3 | Oregon State | 80 |
| 4 | Oklahoma State | 79 |
| 5 | Iowa | 45 |
| 6 | Oklahoma | 44 |
| 7 | Washington | 27 |
| 8 | Pittsburgh | 22 |
| 9 | Ohio | 21 |
| 10 | Michigan | 19 |

== Individual finals ==
| Weight class | Championship Match (Champion in boldface) |
|---|---|
| 118 lbs | **Greg Johnson**, Michigan State DEC Ray Stapp, Oklahoma State |
| 126 lbs | **Dwayne Keller**, Oklahoma State MAJOR Randy Payne, Pittsburgh, 8-0 |
| 134 lbs | **Darrell Keller**, Oklahoma State MAJOR Joe Carstensen, Iowa, 12-2 |
| 142 lbs | **Larry Owings**, Washington DEC Dan Gable, Iowa State, 13-11 |
| 150 lbs | **Mike Grant**, Oklahoma DEC Bob Ferraro, Indiana State, 6-1 |
| 158 lbs | **Dave Martin**, Iowa State DEC Bruce Trammel, Ohio, 5-4 |
| 167 lbs | **Jason Smith**, Iowa State DEC Phil Henning, Iowa, 8-7 |
| 177 lbs | **Chuck Jean**, Iowa State DEC Jim Crumley, Oregon State, 8-6 |
| 190 lbs | **Geoff Baum**, Oklahoma State MAJOR Bob Rust, Syracuse, 9-1 |
| UNL | **Jess Lewis**, Oregon State DEC Greg Wojciechowski, Toledo, 11-2 |
