= National Wrestling Hall of Fame and Museum =

Museum and hall of fame in Stillwater, Oklahoma

Coordinates: 36.12650°N 97.06334°W

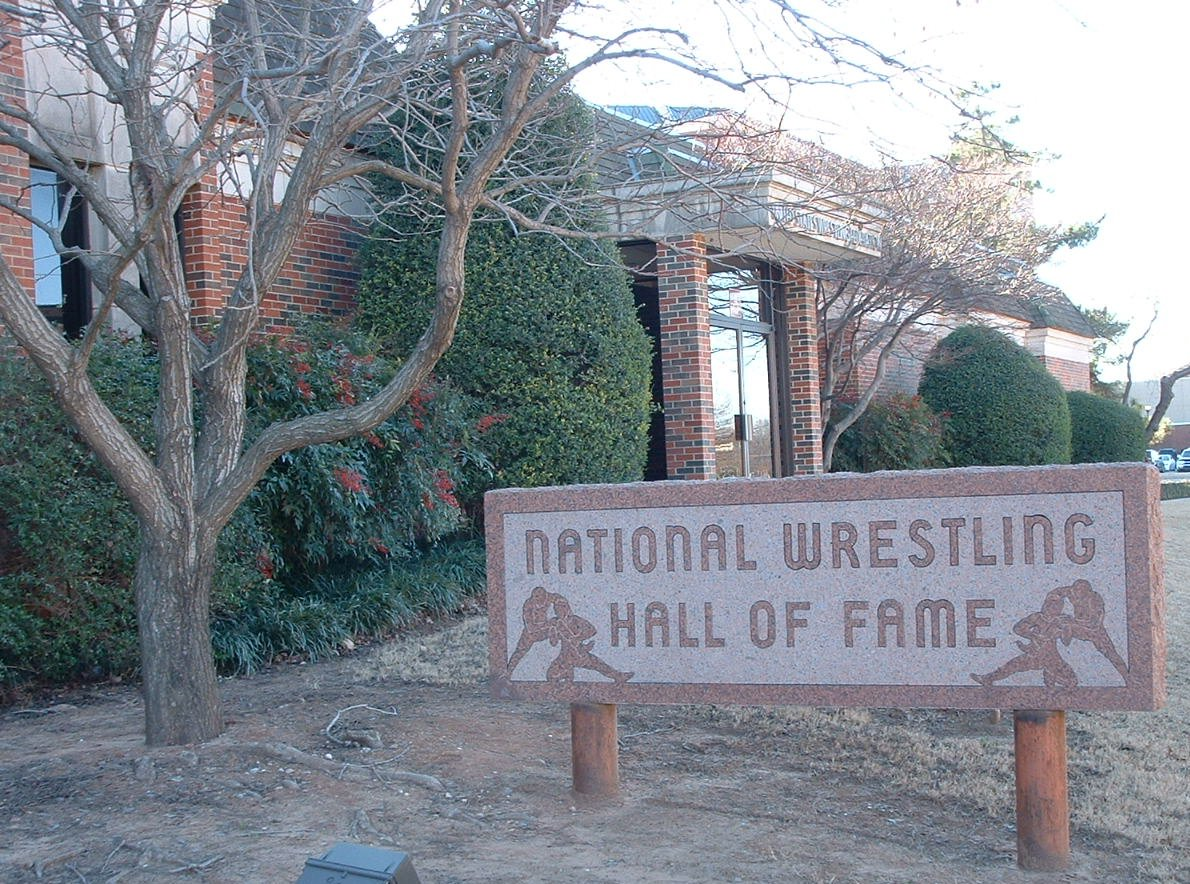
Entrance to the National Wrestling Hall of Fame and Museum, located on the campus of Oklahoma State University in Stillwater

The National Wrestling Hall of Fame and Museum is a museum and hall of fame for amateur wrestling, headquartered in Stillwater, Oklahoma. In 2010, it began operating the Dan Gable Museum in Waterloo, Iowa.

== History ==
The museum was awarded to Stillwater, Oklahoma in 1972 by a decision of the United States Wrestling Federation, which chose Stillwater over a competing bid from Waterloo, Iowa. The museum opened in 1976.

In 2010, the National Wrestling Hall of Fame absorbed the Dan Gable Museum in Waterloo, previously operated by the Dan Gable International Wrestling Institute and Museum. The Dan Gable Museum had opened in 1998 in Newton, Iowa, and would later move to Waterloo in 2006.

In May 2016, the NWHOF voted to revoke all honors given to Dennis Hastert after his conviction, the first time the Hall of Fame has ever revoked honors and punished a now-former inductee.

The museum operates by private donations and state funding. Six people from Oklahoma formed the Hall of Fame corporation: Myron Roderick, Dr. Melvin D. Jones, Ralph Ball, Robert L. McCormick, Bill Aufleger, and Veldo Brewer. Oklahoma State University, through its then-president, Dr. Robert B. Kamm, provided land – at no cost – with a 99-year renewable lease.

== Museums ==
=== National Wrestling Hall of Fame in Stillwater ===
The National Wrestling Hall of Fame in Stillwater, Oklahoma includes the John T. Vaughan Hall of Honors, the Paul K. Scott Museum of Wrestling History, the Cliff Keen Theater, and the William S. Hein Library. The museum covers around 15,000 square feet, featuring multiple interactive exhibits and digital kiosks, as well as the ability to watch NCAA Championship matches from the 1930s to the present day. The John T. Vaughan Hall of Honors is where the greatest names in wrestling are recognized, with Distinguished Members being honored and showcased through granite plaques. The Paul K. Scott Museum of History showcases a portion of the world's largest collection of wrestling artifacts and memorabilia, including most collegiate and Olympic uniforms.

=== Dan Gable Museum in Waterloo ===
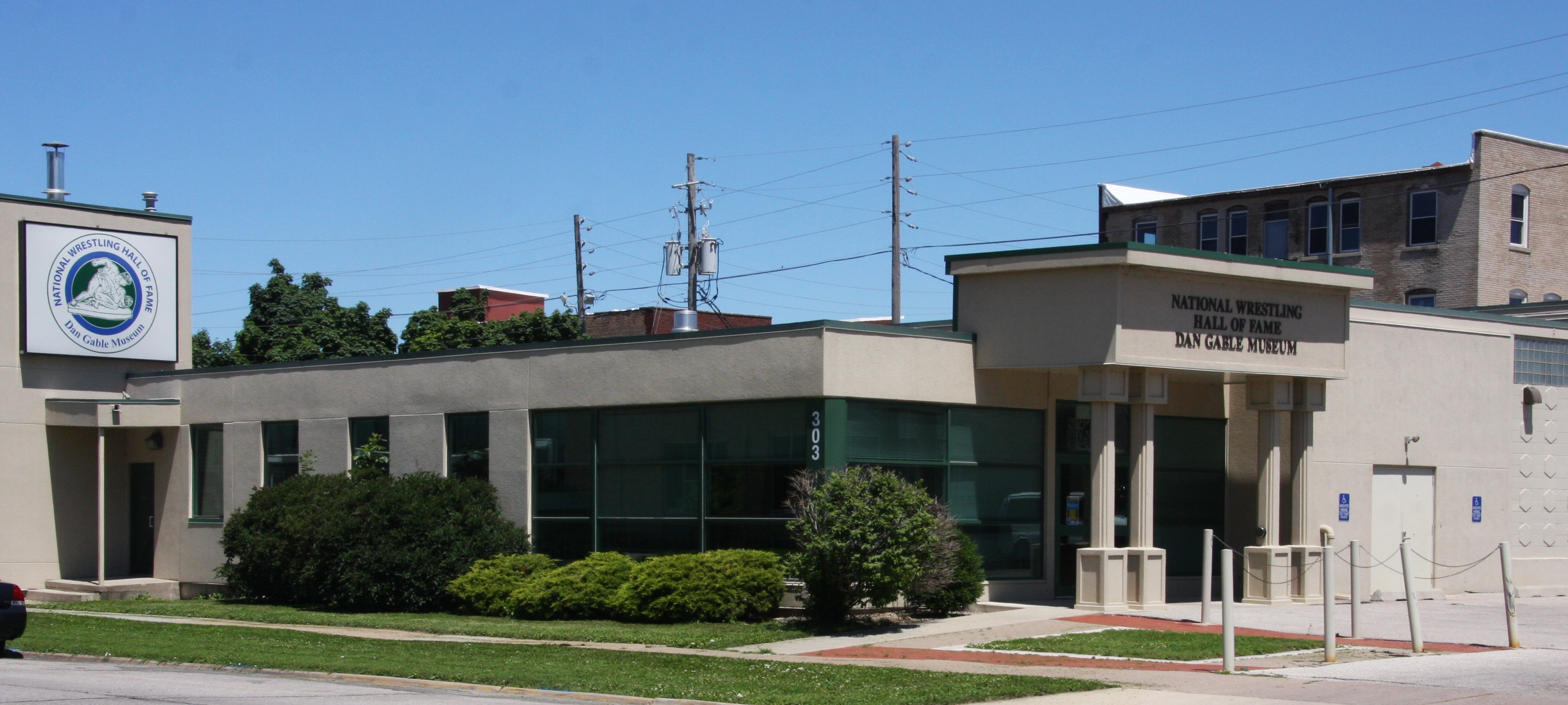
Dan Gable Museum located in Waterloo, Iowa

The National Wrestling Hall of Fame also operates the Dan Gable Museum in Waterloo, Iowa which includes the Glen Brand Wrestling Hall of Fame of Iowa, the George Tragos/Lou Thesz Professional Wrestling Hall of Fame, which honors professional wrestlers with a strong background in amateur wrestling, and the Alan and Gloria Rice Greco-Roman Hall of Champions. It also features the Dan Gable Teaching Center and its wrestling room, providing opportunities for area youth to train.

== State chapters ==
The Board of Governors of the National Wrestling Hall of Fame and Museum established the State Chapter program in 1993. The purpose is to pay tribute to the coaches, officials, and contributors who represent the best qualities of what the sport of wrestling has to offer and who share those characteristics with young people every day. The Hall of Fame and Museum currently has state chapters in 36 states.

== United World Wrestling Hall of Fame ==
The National Wrestling Hall of Fame in Stillwater also contains the UWW Hall of Fame, which honors some of the sport's greatest international wrestlers and coaches.

== See also ==
- Collegiate wrestling
- Freestyle wrestling
- Greco-Roman wrestling
- Scholastic wrestling
