= List of St. Edward High School (Lakewood, Ohio) alumni =

Notable alumni of St. Edward High School in Lakewood, Ohio include:

== Arts, entertainment, and academia ==
- Jerome Caja, 1976 – performance artist
- Dan Coughlin, 1956 – sports anchor/reporter for WJW Fox 8 in Cleveland
- Phil Donahue, 1953 – television talk show host
- Christopher R. Fee – professor, medievalist
- Johnny Gargano, 2005 – WWE wrestler
- Michael Kennedy, 1998 – screenwriter and producer
- Jerry McKenna, 1956 – sculptor
- Ryan Nemeth, 2003 – AEW wrestler
- Patrick K. O'Donnell, 1988 – author and military historian
- Michael Symon, 1987 – Iron Chef; co-host of The Chew

== Business ==
- Tom Coughlin, 1967 – former vice-chairman of Wal-Mart
- Jack Kahl, 1958 – owner of Manco

== Politics ==
- Francis Allegra, 1974 – United States Court of Federal Claims judge
- Ed Feighan, 1965 – former U.S. congressman
- Bryan Flannery, 1986 – former member of the Ohio House of Representatives
- Mark F. Giuliano – former deputy director of the Federal Bureau of Investigation
- Terrence O'Donnell, 1964 – Ohio Supreme Court justice

== Science and medicine ==
- George Bosl, 1965 – cancer researcher at the Memorial Sloan-Kettering Cancer Center

== Sports ==
- Domenic Abounader, 2013 – NCAA wrestling All-American at Michigan, silver medalist for Lebanon at 2018 Asian Games in freestyle wrestling
- Rodney Bailey, 1997 – former NFL defensive end
- Ryan Bertin, 2000 – two-time NCAA wrestling champion and four-time All-American at Michigan
- Alex Boone, 2005 – NFL offensive tackle
- Mark Carney, 1998 – football coach
- Roger Chandler, 1992 – NCAA wrestling runner-up and three-time All-American at Indiana, current head coach of Michigan State wrestling team
- Sam Clancy, Jr., 1998 – former NBA basketball player
- Tom Cousineau, 1975 – Ohio State and NFL linebacker, first pick in 1979 NFL draft, member of College Football Hall of Fame
- Andrew Dowell, 2015 – NFL player
- Montorie Foster, 2020 – college football wide receiver for the Michigan State Spartans
- Alan Fried, 1989 – NCAA wrestling champion and three-time finalist at Iowa, four-time Junior National freestyle champion, author
- Johnny Gargano, 2004 – WWE Superstar
- DeJuan Groce, 1998 – former NFL cornerback
- Todd Harkins, 1987 – former player for NHL's Calgary Flames and Hartford Whalers
- Jim Heffernan, 1982 – NCAA wrestling champion and four-time All-American at Iowa, current head coach of University of Illinois wrestling team
- Dean Heil, 2013 – two-time NCAA champion wrestler and three-time All-American at Oklahoma State
- Alphonso Hodge, 2000 – former CFL cornerback and wide receiver
- Chris Honeycutt, 2007 – NCAA wrestling runner-up and two-time All-American at Edinboro, professional MMA fighter for Bellator MMA
- Andy Hrovat, 1998 – three-time NCAA wrestling All-American at Michigan, Olympic freestyle wrestler at Beijing 2008
- James Hoye, 1989 – MLB Umpire
- Mark Jayne, 2000 – two-time NCAA wrestling All-American at Illinois
- Kyle Kalis, 2012 – Michigan and NFL football player
- Steve Logan, 1998 – professional basketball player and 2002 NCAA consensus 1st team All-American
- Gray Maynard, 1998 – three-time NCAA wrestling All-American at Michigan State, UFC fighter
- Darlington Nagbe, 2008 – professional soccer player, 2nd overall draft pick by Portland Timbers (MLS), MLS Cup Champion, United States men's national soccer team player
- Haruki Nakamura, 2004 – professional football player
- Lance Palmer, 2006 – NCAA wrestling runner-up and four-time All-American at Ohio State, professional Mixed Martial Artist, former World Series of Fighting featherweight champion
- Delvon Roe, 2008 – Michigan State forward
- Michael Rupp, 1998 – former Minnesota Wild center, Stanley Cup champion
- Matt Stainbrook, 2009 – Xavier basketball player
- Justin Staples, 2008 – NFL player
- Jawad Williams, 2001 – former Cleveland Cavaliers player
- Dolph Ziggler (real name Nic Nemeth), 1998 – WWE wrestler, NCAA wrestler at Kent State
