= Greg Urbas =

American wrestling coach

Greg Urbas is a former teacher and head wrestling coach at St. Edward High School in Lakewood, Ohio.

== Military career ==
From 1973–1977, Urbas was an officer in the United States Marine Corps.

== Teaching career ==
While at St. Edward High School, Urbas was a math teacher. He currently serves as a math tutor.

== Coaching career ==
Urbas was head coach at St. Edward for 29 years, from 1989 to 2018, where his teams won 24 state titles and 4 national titles. In 1998, Urbas was named national wrestling coach of the year by the National High School Coaches Association.

== Notable athletes coached ==
- Domenic Abounader, NCAA wrestling All-American at Michigan and silver medalist at 2018 Asian Games in freestyle wrestling
- Ryan Bertin, 2-time NCAA wrestling national champion and 4-time All-American at Michigan
- Roger Chandler, NCAA wrestling runner-up and 3-time All-American at Indiana, head coach for Michigan State University wrestling team
- Dean Heil, 2-time NCAA wrestling national champion and 3-time All-American at Oklahoma State
- Chris Honeycutt, NCAA wrestling national runner-up and 2-time All-American at Edinboro, professional mixed martial artist
- Andy Hrovat, 3-time NCAA wrestling All-American at Michigan and 2008 Olympian in freestyle wrestling
- Mark Jayne, 2-time NCAA wrestling All-American at Illinois
- Gray Maynard, 3-time NCAA wrestling All-American at Michigan State, former UFC title challenger
- Nic Nemeth, WWE Wrestler, collegiate wrestler at Kent State
- Lance Palmer, NCAA wrestling national runner-up and 4-time All-American at Ohio State, Professional Fighters League featherweight champion
