= 2015 NCAA Division I Wrestling Championships =

2015 NCAA Division I Wrestling Tournament
- Format: Double-elimination
- Finals site: St. Louis, Missouri; Scottrade Center
- Champions: Ohio State Buckeyes (1st title)
- Runner-up: Iowa Hawkeyes
- Semifinalists: Edinboro Fighting Scots; Missouri
- Winning coach: Tom Ryan (1st title)
- MVP: Logan Stieber (Ohio State)
- Attendance: 113,013
- Television: ESPN Networks

The 2015 NCAA Division I Wrestling Championships took place from March 19 to March 21 in St. Louis, Missouri at the Scottrade Center. The tournament was the 85th NCAA Division I Wrestling Championships. Ohio State Buckeyes won their first title. Ohio State's head coach Tom Ryan was named NCAA Coach of the Year for the second time.

To date, this is the last time that Penn State did not appear in the final championship game.

== Team results ==
- Note: Top 10 only
- (H): Team from hosting U.S. state
- Number of individual champions in parentheses

| Rank | Team | Points |
|---|---|---|
| 1 | Ohio State | 102 (2) |
| 2 | Iowa | 84 |
| 3 | Edinboro | 75 1/2 |
| 4 | Missouri (H) | 73 1/2 (1) |
| 5 | Cornell | 71 1/2 (1) |
| 6 | Penn State | 67 1/2 (1) |
| 7 | Oklahoma State | 65 |
| 8 | Minnesota | 59 1/2 |
| 9 | Nebraska | 59 |
| 9 | Virginia Tech | 56 |

== Individual results ==
- Note: Table does not include wrestlebacks
- (H): Individual from hosting U.S. State

| Weight | First | Second | Third |
|---|---|---|---|
| 125 lbs | Nathan Tomasello; Ohio State | Zeke Moisey; West Virginia | Alan Waters; Missouri |
| 133 lbs | Cody Brewer; Oklahoma Sooners | Cory Clark; Iowa | Aaron Schoop; Edinboro |
| 141 lbs | Logan Stieber; Ohio State | Mitchell Port; Edinboro | Devin Carter; Virginia Tech |
| 149 lbs | Drake Houdashelt; Missouri | David Habat; Edinboro | Jason Tsirtsis; Northwestern |
| 157 lbs | Isaiah Martinez; Illinois Fighting Illini | Brian Realbuto; Cornell | James Green; Nebraska |
| 165 lbs | Alex Dieringer; Oklahoma State | Taylor Walsh; Indiana | Bo Jordan; Ohio State |
| 174 lbs | Matt Brown; Penn State | Tyler Wilps; Pittsburgh | Robert Kokesh; Nebraska |
| 184 lbs | Gabe Dean; Cornell | Nathaniel Brown; Lehigh | Victor Avery; Edinboro |
| 197 lbs | Kyven Gadson; Iowa State | Kyle Snyder; Ohio State | Morgan McIntosh; Penn State |
| 285 lbs | Nick Gwiazdowski; NC State | Adam Coon; Michigan | Michael McMullan; Northwestern |
