= 2019 World Wrestling Championships – Men's freestyle 61 kg =

Men's freestyle 61 kg at the 2019 World Championships
- Venue: Barys Arena
- Dates: 21–22 September 2019
- Competitors: 25 from 25 nations

Medalists
gold medal	Beka Lomtadze	Georgia
silver medal	Magomedrasul Idrisov	Russia
bronze medal	Behnam Ehsanpour	Iran
bronze medal	Rahul Aware	India

The men's freestyle 61 kilograms is a competition featured at the 2019 World Wrestling Championships, and was held in Nur-Sultan, Kazakhstan on 21 and 22 September.

This freestyle wrestling competition consists of a single-elimination tournament, with a repechage used to determine the winner of two bronze medals. The two finalists face off for gold and silver medals. Each wrestler who loses to one of the two finalists moves into the repechage, culminating in a pair of bronze medal matches featuring the semifinal losers each facing the remaining repechage opponent from their half of the bracket.

== Results ==
Legend

- F — Won by fall

=== Final ===
Final
Magomedrasul Idrisov (RUS)	1
Beka Lomtadze (GEO)	6

=== Top half ===
Round of 32
Magomedrasul Idrisov (RUS)	6
Andrei Bekreneu (BLR)	1
Tümenbilegiin Tüvshintulga (MGL)	3
Kaiki Yamaguchi (JPN)	2
Abbos Rakhmonov (UZB)	14
Egor Dmitriev (PHI)	2

Round of 16
Yowlys Bonne (CUB)	0
Akhmednabi Gvarzatilov (AZE)	7
Behnam Ehsanpour (IRI)	6
Recep Topal (TUR)	3
Magomedrasul Idrisov (RUS)	4
Tümenbilegiin Tüvshintulga (MGL)	1
Abbos Rakhmonov (UZB)	8
Nikolay Okhlopkov (ROU)	1

Quarterfinals
Akhmednabi Gvarzatilov (AZE)	12
Behnam Ehsanpour (IRI)	13
Magomedrasul Idrisov (RUS)	11
Abbos Rakhmonov (UZB)	0

Semifinals
Behnam Ehsanpour (IRI)	2
Magomedrasul Idrisov (RUS)	2

=== Bottom half ===
Round of 32
Scott Schiller (CAN)	4
Mihai Eșanu (MDA)	6
Kim Jin-cheol (KOR)	0
Tyler Graff (USA)	10
Liu Minghu (CHN)	3
Petro Bileichuk (UKR)	2
Randy Vock (SUI)	2
Almaz Smanbekov (KGZ)	12
Isa Merkja (ALB)	0
Rassul Kaliyev (KAZ)	11
Kerim Hojakow (TKM)	5^{F}
Elmedin Sejfulau (MKD)	0

Round of 16
Beka Lomtadze (GEO)	10
Mihai Eșanu (MDA)	0
Tyler Graff (USA)	7
Liu Minghu (CHN)	0
Almaz Smanbekov (KGZ)	4
Rassul Kaliyev (KAZ)	8
Kerim Hojakow (TKM)	2
Rahul Aware (IND)	13

Quarterfinals
Beka Lomtadze (GEO)	3
Tyler Graff (USA)	1
Rassul Kaliyev (KAZ)	7
Rahul Aware (IND)	10

Semifinals
Beka Lomtadze (GEO)	10
Rahul Aware (IND)	6

=== Repechage ===
Repechage round 1
Andrei Bekreneu (BLR)	2
Tümenbilegiin Tüvshintulga (MGL)	1

Repechage round 2
Andrei Bekreneu (BLR)	2
Abbos Rakhmonov (UZB)	7
Mihai Eșanu (MDA)	2
Tyler Graff (USA)	13

Bronze medals
Abbos Rakhmonov (UZB)	0
Behnam Ehsanpour (IRI)	8
Tyler Graff (USA)	4
Rahul Aware (IND)	11
