= 2020 Individual Wrestling World Cup – Men's freestyle 61 kg =

The men's freestyle 61 kilograms is a competition featured at the 2020 Individual Wrestling World Cup, and was held in Belgrade, Serbia on 17 and 18 December 2020.

== Medalists ==
Gold	Abasgadzhi Magomedov; Russia
Silver	Akhmednabi Gvarzatilov; Azerbaijan
Bronze	Agustín Destribats; Argentina
Bronze	Georgi Vangelov; Bulgaria

== Results ==
Legend

- F — Won by fall
- WO — Won by walkover

1/16 finals
	Score	
Recep Topal (TUR)	2–4	Muhamad Ikromov (TJK)
Nino Leutert (SUI)	3–5	Nico Megerle (GER)
Ivan Guidea (ROU)	WO	~~Georgios Pilidis (GRE)~~
Abdelghani Benatallah (ALG)	6–14	Ayub Musaev (BEL)

1/8 finals
Abasgadzhi Magomedov (RUS)	12
Volodymyr Burukov (UKR)	2
Eduard Grigorev (POL)	7
Razmik Papikyan (ARM)	8
Agustín Destribats (ARG)	10^{F}
Ulukbek Zholdoshbekov (KGZ)	4
Richárd Vilhelm (HUN)	0
Rahul Aware (IND)	10
Leonid Colesnic (MDA)	0
Georgi Vangelov (BUL)	10
Akhmednabi Gvarzatilov (AZE)	9
Arman Eloyan (FRA)	5
Muhamad Ikromov (TJK)	6
Nico Megerle (GER)	3
Ivan Guidea (ROU)	6
Ayub Musaev (BEL)	2

Quarterfinals
Abasgadzhi Magomedov (RUS)	10
Razmik Papikyan (ARM)	0
Agustín Destribats (ARG)	6
Rahul Aware (IND)	6
Georgi Vangelov (BUL)	3
Akhmednabi Gvarzatilov (AZE)	4
Muhamad Ikromov (TJK)	4
Ivan Guidea (ROU)	2

Semifinals
Abasgadzhi Magomedov (RUS)	7
Agustín Destribats (ARG)	0
Akhmednabi Gvarzatilov (AZE)	8
Muhamad Ikromov (TJK)	1

Final
Abasgadzhi Magomedov (RUS)	5
Akhmednabi Gvarzatilov (AZE)	1

Repechage round 1
Volodymyr Burukov (UKR)	1
Razmik Papikyan (ARM)	5
Arman Eloyan (FRA)	8
Georgi Vangelov (BUL)	8

Bronze medals
Razmik Papikyan (ARM)	2
Agustín Destribats (ARG)	5
Georgi Vangelov (BUL)	9
Muhamad Ikromov (TJK)	8
