= 2023 Big Ten Wrestling Championships – 184 lbs =

184 pounds at the 2023 Big Ten Wrestling Championships
- Site: Crisler Center; Ann Arbor, Michigan
- Competitors: 14

Medalists
- 1st place, gold medalist(s): Aaron Brooks (Penn State)
- 2nd place, silver medalist(s): Kaleb Romero (Ohio State)
- 3rd place, bronze medalist(s): Matt Finesilver (Michigan)

The 184-pound competition at the 2023 Big Ten Wrestling Championships in Ann Arbor, Michigan, took place from March 4–5, 2023 at the Crisler Center.

The competition consisted of a triple-elimination tournament to determine the top ten wrestlers of the Big Ten's 184-pound weight class. The top nine wrestlers would qualify for the 2023 NCAA Division I Wrestling Championships.

== Preliminary seeds ==
The Big Ten announced the preliminary seeds on February 27, 2023.

Seed	Wrestler
1	Aaron Brooks (Penn State)
2	Kaleb Romero (Ohio State)
3	Isaiah Tal-Salazar (Minnesota)
4	Matt Finesilver (Michigan)
5	Abe Assad (Iowa)
6	Layne Malczewski (Michigan State)
7	Lenny Pinto (Nebraska)
8	Brian Soldano (Rutgers)
9	Dylan Connell (Illinois)
10	Tyler Dow (Wisconsin)
11	Evan Bates (Northwestern)
12	Ben Vanadia (Purdue)
13	Clayton Fielden (Indiana)
14	Kevin Makosy (Maryland)

== Results ==
Legend

- F — Won by fall
- MF — Won by medical forfeit

=== Championship bracket ===
First Round
1	Aaron Brooks (PSU)
BYE
9	Dylan Connell (ILL)	2
8	Brian Soldano (RUT)	4
5	Abe Assad (IOWA)	6
12	Ben Vanadia (PUR)	1
13	Clayton Fielden (IND)	0
4	Matt Finesilver (MICH)	12
3	Isaiah Tal-Salazar (MINN)	18
14	Kevin Makosy (MD)	0
11	Evan Bates (NU)	0
6	Layne Malczewski (MSU)	8^{F}
7	Lenny Pinto (NEB)	4^{F}
10	Tyler Dow (WIS)	1
BYE
2	Kaleb Romero (OSU)

Quarterfinals
1	Aaron Brooks (PSU)	18
8	Brian Soldano (RUT)	2
5	Abe Assad (IOWA)	0
4	Matt Finesilver (MICH)	3^{F}
3	Isaiah Tal-Salazar (MINN)	8
6	Layne Malczewski (MSU)	5
7	Lenny Pinto (NEB)	3
2	Kaleb Romero (OSU)	4

Semifinals
1	Aaron Brooks (PSU)	18
4	Matt Finesilver (MICH)	6
3	Isaiah Tal-Salazar (MINN)	2
2	Kaleb Romero (OSU)	3

1st-Place Match
1	Aaron Brooks (PSU)	12
2	Kaleb Romero (OSU)	2

=== Consolation bracket ===
Consolation Round 1
BYE
BYE

Consolation Round 2

Consolation Quarterfinals
7th-Place Match

Consolation Semifinals
5th-Place Match

3rd-Place Match

== Final standings ==
Note: Top-9 wrestlers qualify for the 2023 NCAA Division I Wrestling Championships.

Rank	Wrestler
1st place, gold medalist(s)	Aaron Brooks (Penn State)
2nd place, silver medalist(s)	Kaleb Romero (Ohio State)
3rd place, bronze medalist(s)	Matt Finesilver (Michigan)
4	Isaiah Tal-Salazar (Minnesota)
5	Lenny Pinto (Nebraska)
6	Brian Soldano (Rutgers)
7	Abe Assad (Iowa)
8	Layne Malczewski (Michigan State)
9	Dylan Connell (Illinois)
10	Evan Bates (Northwestern)
