= Wrestling in Canada =

Wrestling Canada Lutte
- Sport: Wrestling (Amateur)
- Abbreviation: WCL
- Founded: 1969
- Affiliation: United World Wrestling (UWW)
- Replaced: Canadian Amateur Wrestling Association

Official website
- wrestling.ca
- (Canada)

The sport of wrestling has been practiced in Canada for more than a century, with the first amateur wrestling championships being held at Toronto's Argonaut Rowing Club in 1901. The sport continued to grow during the 20th century and by 1969, the Canadian Amateur Wrestling Association was formed. Today the same organization is called Wrestling Canada Lutte, and is the national governing body for Olympic style wrestling in Canada. The organization's purpose is to encourage and develop the widest participation and highest proficiency in Olympic wrestling in Canada.

== Canada Summer Games ==
Wrestling is a sport officially included in the Canada Summer Games program. Initially the program considered wrestling a winter sport and was featured at the first Canada Games in 1967. In 2005, women's freestyle wrestling was added to the program.

Wrestling will be a part of the 2022 Canada Summer Games, a.k.a. 'Niagara Games', August 6–21, 2022, which will be hosted in the Niagara Region of Ontario, Canada. The wrestling events will take place at the new Canada Games Park.

The following Canadian wrestlers have competed in the Canada Summer Games:

- Chris Rinke | (1979)
- Sunny Dhinsa | (2009)
- Justina Di Stasio | (2009)
- Linda Morais | (2009)
- Michelle Fazzari | (2005)
- David Tremblay | (2005)
- Darthe Capellan | (2013)

== Notables in Canadian wrestling ==
=== Olympic medalists ===
- Aubert Côté – 1908 Summer Olympics bronze medalist at bantamweight in men's freestyle wrestling
- Carol Huynh – Two-time Olympic medalist, winning gold in 2008 and bronze in 2012 in women's freestyle wrestling. Four-time World medalist in 2000, 2001, 2005 and 2010.
- Daniel Igali – 2000 Olympic gold medalist and 1999 World Champion in men's freestyle wrestling
- Maurice Letchford – 1928 Summer Olympics bronze medalist at welterweight in men's freestyle wrestling
- Daniel MacDonald – 1932 Summer Olympics silver medalist at welterweight in men's freestyle wrestling
- Robert Molle – 1984 Olympic silver medalist at 100+ kg in men's freestyle wrestling
- Christopher Rinke – 1984 Olympic bronze medalist at 82 kg in men's freestyle wrestling
- Joe Schleimer – 1936 Summer Olympics bronze medalist and 1934 British Empire Games gold medalist at welterweight in men's freestyle wrestling
- Guivi Sissaouri – 2001 World Champion and Olympic silver medalist at 1996 Summer Olympics in men's freestyle wrestling, five total World and Olympic level medals
- Donald Stockton – 1928 Summer Olympics silver medalist at middleweight in men's freestyle wrestling
- Jeff Thue – 1992 Olympic silver medalist and 1991 World bronze medalist at 130 kg in men's freestyle wrestling
- Jim Trifunov – 1928 Summer Olympics bronze medalist and 1930 British Empire Games gold medalist at bantamweight in men's freestyle wrestling
- Tonya Verbeek – Three-time Olympic medalist, winning two silver and a bronze medal at the 2004, 2008 and 2012 Olympics in women's freestyle wrestling. Three-time World medalist in 2005, 2009 and 2011.
- Erica Wiebe – 2016 Olympic gold medalist at 75 kg in women's freestyle wrestling

== Gallery ==
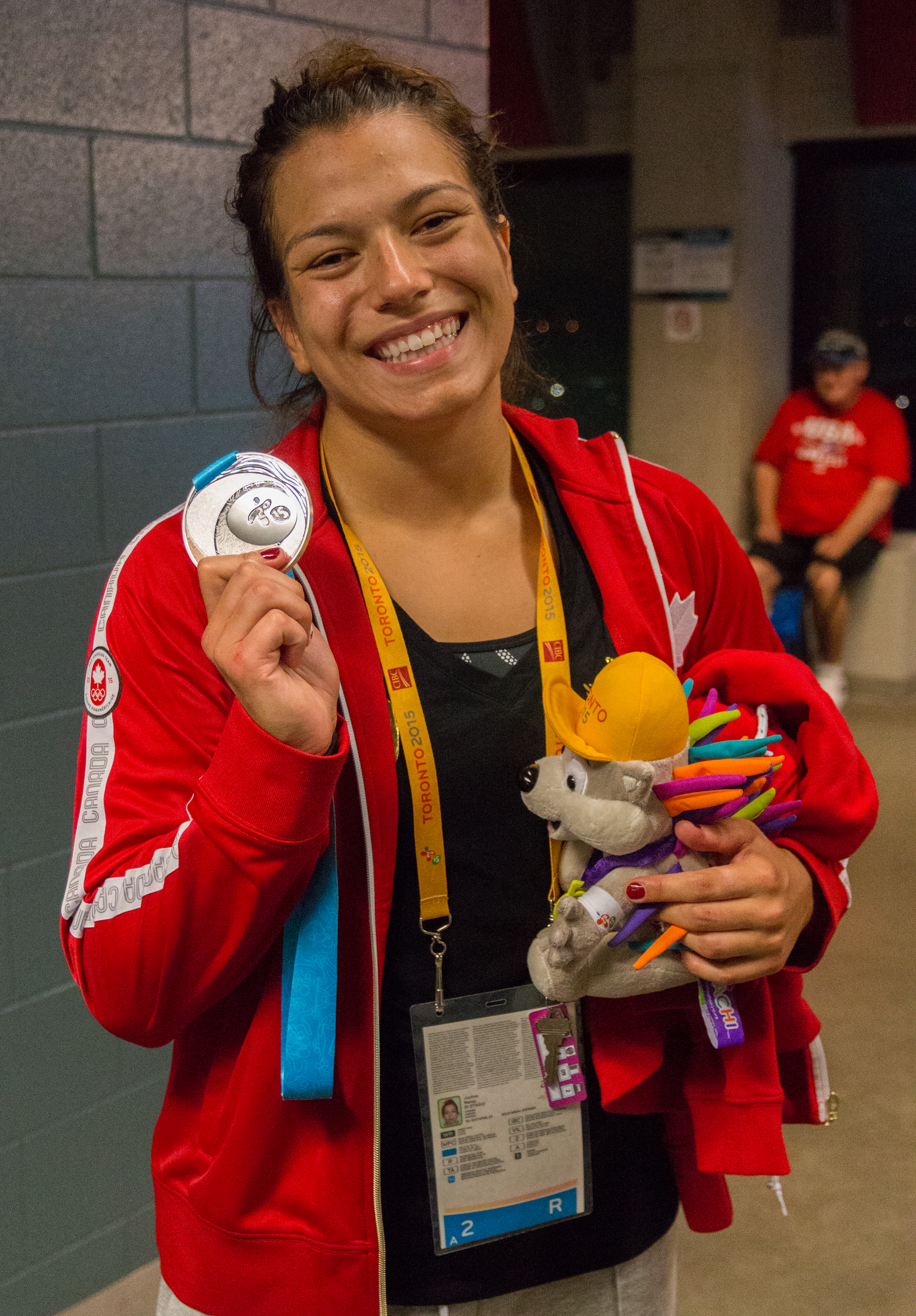
Justina Di Stasio

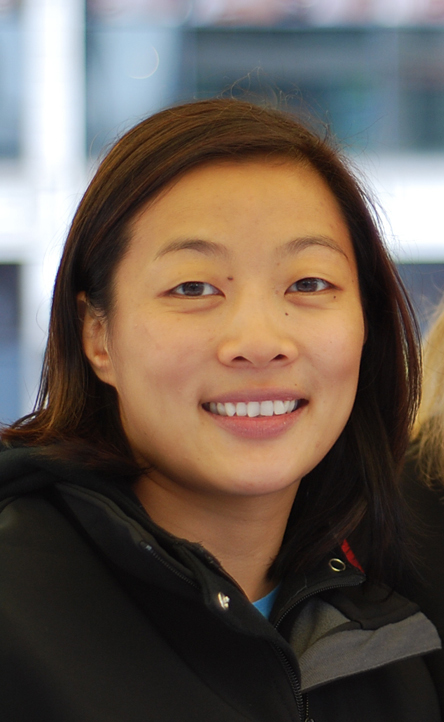
Carol Huynh⁣

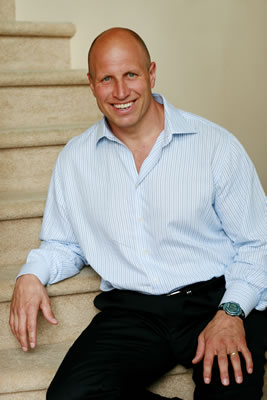
Robert Molle

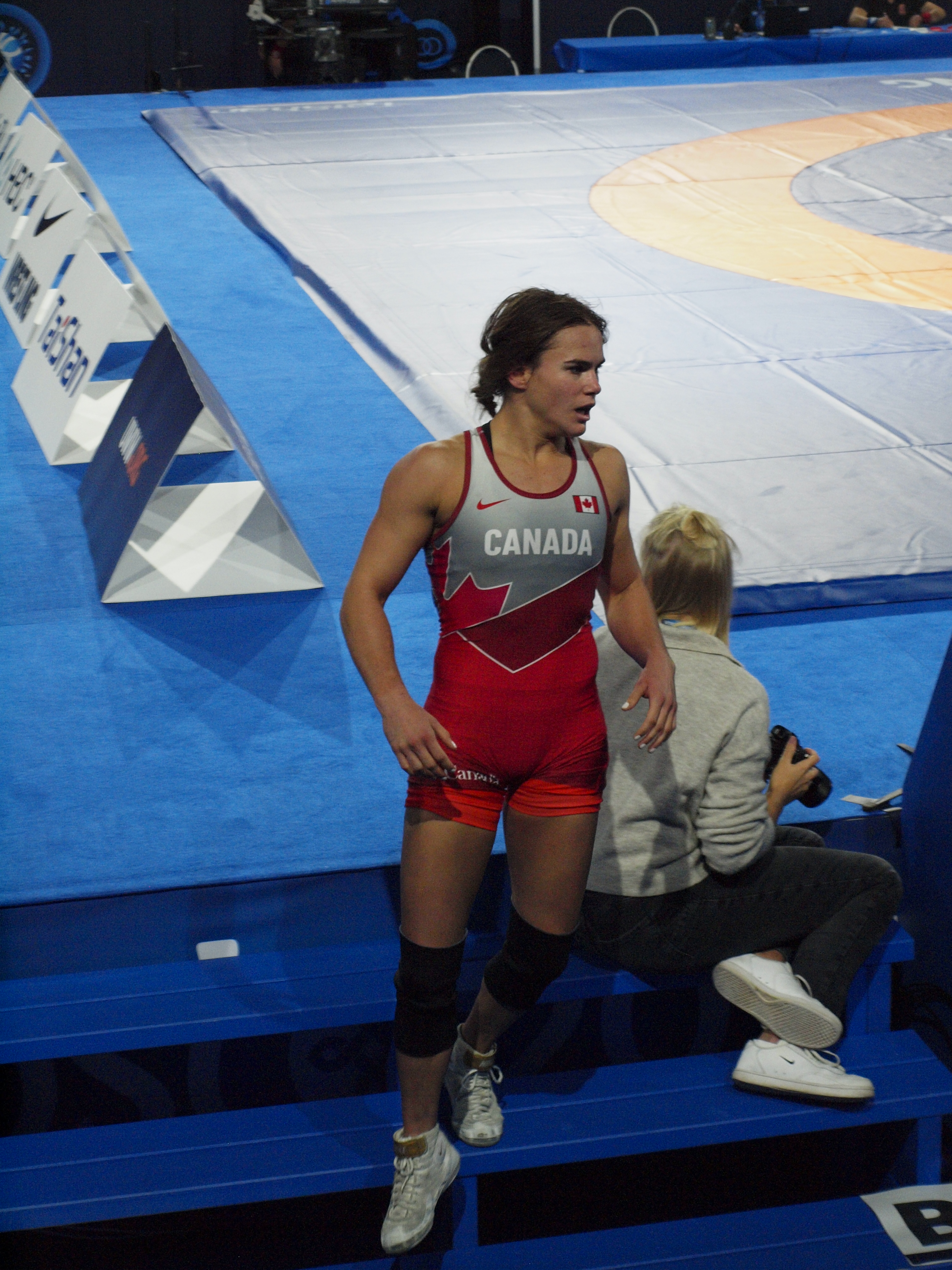
Linda Morais

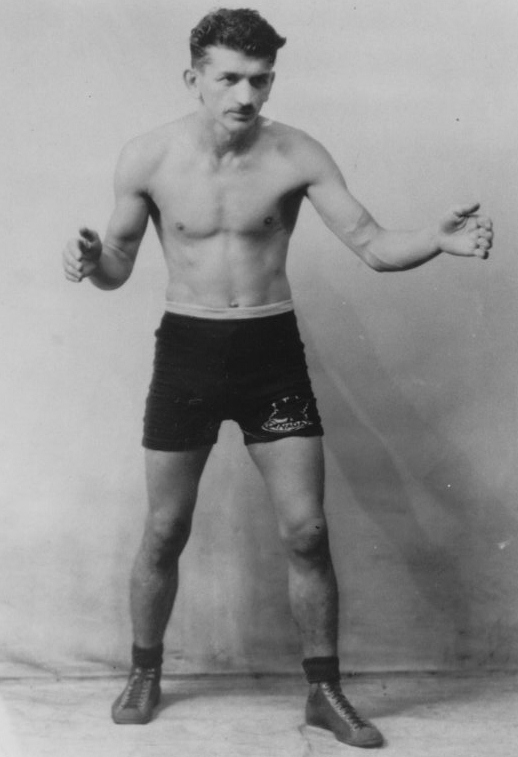
Jim Trifunov

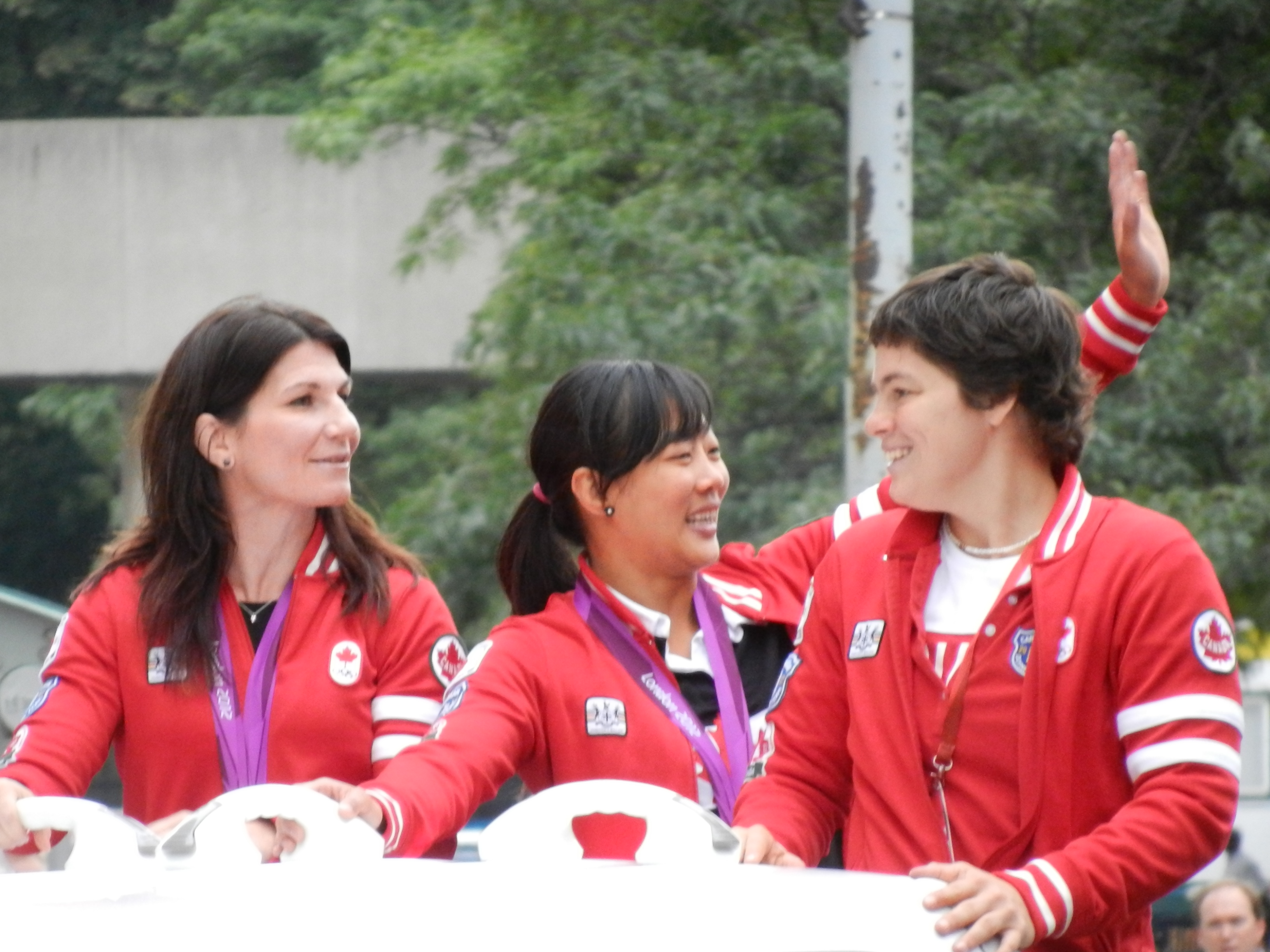
Tonya Verbeek
(Verbeek pictured far left)

== Popular culture ==
In 2012, a 45-minute TV movie/documentary was released by Vanwestfilm Productions about the development of women's wrestling in Canada called, Wrestling with Attitude. The film focused on two female Canadian wrestlers in particular – former Simon Fraser University wrestler Carol Huynh, who begins training with the Calgary Dinos at the University of Calgary, and Junior World wrestling champion Danielle Lappage, originally from Alberta and was then training at Simon Fraser University in her first year as a senior wrestler.
