= Rozan =

Rozan may refer to

- Rozan (surname)
- Rozan (comedy duo), a Japanese comedy duo
- Gmina Różan, administrative district in Poland
  - Różan, administrative center of Gmina Różan
  - Battle of Różan between Poland and Germany in 1939
  - Różan Land, a former administrative district in Poland
