= 2018 European Wrestling Championships – Men's freestyle 61 kg =

The men's freestyle 61 kg is a competition featured at the 2018 European Wrestling Championships, and was held in Kaspiysk, Russia on May 5 and May 6.

== Medalists ==
| Gold | Gadzhimurad Rashidov; Russia |
| Silver | Beka Lomtadze; Georgia |
| Bronze | Ivan Guidea; Romania |
| Bronze | Recep Topal; Turkey |

== Results ==
Legend

- F — Won by fall

=== Main Bracket ===
Round of 16
Nurgun Skryabin (BLR) | 13
Elmedin Sejfulau (MKD) | 2
Gadzhimurad Rashidov (RUS) | 10
Volodymyr Burukov (UKR) | 0
Recep Topal (TUR) | 13
Garik Barseghyan (ARM) | 2
József Molnár (HUN) | 5
Vladimir Dubov (BUL) | 8

Quarterfinals
Randy Vock (SUI) | 0
Mirjalal Hasanzada (AZE) | 10
Beka Lomtadze (GEO) | 11
Ivan Guidea (ROU) | 0
Nurgun Skryabin (BLR) | 1
Gadzhimurad Rashidov (RUS) | 10
Recep Topal (TUR) | 15
Vladimir Dubov (BUL) | 10

Semifinals
Mirjalal Hasanzada (AZE) | 0
Beka Lomtadze (GEO) | 12
Gadzhimurad Rashidov (RUS) | 4
Recep Topal (TUR) | 0

Final
Beka Lomtadze (GEO) | 1
Gadzhimurad Rashidov (RUS) | 4

=== Repechage ===
Repechage round 1
Volodymyr Burukov (UKR) | 1
Nurgun Skryabin (BLR) | 4^{F}

Bronze medal match
Ivan Guidea (ROU) | 5
Mirjalal Hasanzada (AZE) | 2
Nurgun Skryabin (BLR) | 6
Recep Topal (TUR) | 6
