= Jim Trifunov =

Canadian sport wrestler (1903–1993)

James Trifunov
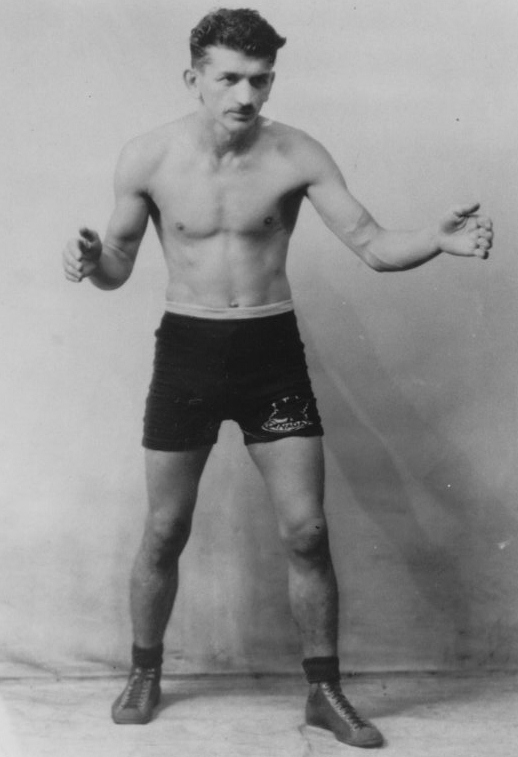
- James Trifunov in 1928

Personal information
- Born: July 18, 1903 Truax, Saskatchewan, Canada
- Died: June 27, 1993 (aged 89) Winnipeg, Manitoba, Canada
Medal record
Men's freestyle wrestling
Representing Canada
Olympic Games
Bronze medal – third place	1928 Amsterdam	Bantamweight
British Empire Games
Gold medal – first place	1930 Hamilton	Bantamweight

James Trifunov (July 18, 1903 – June 27, 1993) was a Canadian freestyle wrestler who competed in the 1924 Summer Olympics, the 1928 Summer Olympics and 1932 Summer Olympics. His parents Mr. and Mrs. Rade Trifunov came from Jarkovac, Austria-Hungary, now Serbia, to Canada in March 1902 and settled in Truax, Saskatchewan, where James was born the following year.

== Biography ==
Of Serbian descent, Jim Trifunov began his career as a newsboy in Regina, later he took up wrestling at his local YMCA in 1922. One year later, he had won his first of nine almost-consecutive Canadian bantamweight championships, missing only the 1931 championship due to an injury. His successes sent him to three editions of the Olympic Games, the most notable of which was in 1928, when he captured a bronze medal by overcoming Harold Sansum of Great Britain in the match for the bronze medal. He also won a gold medal in the bantamweight division at the inaugural 1930 British Empire Games by defeating Joseph Reid of England. He retired from active competition following the 1932 Olympic Games and resumed his career with Regina's Leader-Post.

In 1936 he was sent by the Sifton Publishing Company from Regina to Winnipeg, to work with the city's Winnipeg Free Press. He would remain in Winnipeg the rest of his life. While there he took up coaching and sports administration, eventually serving as president of the Manitoba Wrestling Association for a quarter of a century. He also held executive roles in the Canadian Amateur Wrestling Association and Manitoba Wrestling associations and was coach and manager of Canada's wrestling delegations to 1952, 1956, and 1960 Summer Olympics, as well as every edition of the British Empire Games between 1954 and 1970. Among his many honors, he was made a member of the Order of Canada in 1981 and has been inducted into the Canadian Olympic in 1953, Canada's Sports Hall of Fame in 1960, and the Saskatchewan Sports Hall of Fame in 1966. Also, he was inducted into the Manitoba Sports Hall of Fame in 1981.

His voluntary activities and initiatives have included school-crossing patrols, which have spread across the continent.

== Certificates and awards ==
- The Amateur Athletic Union of Canada certificate to Jim Trifunov for his work with the youth of Canada and his fellow sportsmen (Archives Canada).
- British Columbia 1958 Centennial award to Jim Trifunov for the Canadian Amateur Wrestling Championships (Archives Canada).
- An Award presented to Jim Trifunov by the Manitoba Sports Federation for a builder of sport (Archives Canada).
- Card that reads Canadian Amateur Wrestling Hall of Fame James "Jim" Trifunov Admitted March 16, 1975 (Archives Canada).
- Canadian Amateur Wrestling Association James Trifunov Air Canada Sports Award for Executive of the Year (Archives Canada).
