= 2019 European Wrestling Championships – Men's freestyle 61 kg =

The men's freestyle 61 kg is a competition featured at the 2019 European Wrestling Championships, and was held in Bucharest, Romania on April 9 and April 10.

== Medalists ==
Gold	Arsen Harutyunyan; Armenia
Silver	Beka Lomtadze; Georgia
Bronze	Randy Vock; Switzerland
Bronze	Recep Topal; Turkey

== Results ==
Legend

- F — Won by fall

=== Main Bracket ===
Round of 16
Isa Merkja (ALB)	2
Randy Vock (SUI)	3
Stanislav Novac (MDA)	10
Daniel Popov (ISR)	5
Arsen Harutyunyan (ARM)	14
Volodymyr Burukov (UKR)	8
Magomedrasul Idrisov (RUS)	9
Recep Topal (TUR)	11
Asgar Mammadaliyev (AZE)	0
Nikolai Okhlopkov (ROU)	6
Andrei Bekreneu (BLR)	1
Mikyay Naim (BUL)	12

Quarterfinals
Beka Lomtadze (GEO)	10
Elmedin Sejfulau (NMK)	0
Randy Vock (SUI)	6
Stanislav Novac (MDA)	2
Arsen Harutyunyan (ARM)	5^{F}
Recep Topal (TUR)	2
Nikolai Okhlopkov (ROU)	9
Mikyay Naim (BUL)	0

Semifinals
Beka Lomtadze (GEO)	10
Randy Vock (SUI)	0
Arsen Harutyunyan (ARM)	10
Nikolai Okhlopkov (ROU)	4

Final
Beka Lomtadze (GEO)	11
Arsen Harutyunyan (ARM)	17

=== Repechage ===
Repechage round 1
Volodymyr Burukov (UKR)	8
Recep Topal (TUR)	10

Bronze medal match
Elmedin Sejfulau (NMK)	5
Randy Vock (SUI)	6
Recep Topal (TUR)	8^{F}
Nikolai Okhlopkov (ROU)	1
