= Arthur Ford (wrestler) =

Australian wrestler

Personal information
- Nationality: Australian
- Born: 15 January 1903
- Died: 14 July 1986 (aged 83)

Sport
- Sport: Wrestling

Arthur E. Ford (15 January 1903 – 14 July 1986) was a wrestler who represent Australia at the 1928 Summer Olympics. Ford competed in the freestyle bantamweight contest at the 1928 Summer Olympics held in Amsterdam. Ford lost his first round bout against Swiss wrestler Amédée Piguet, so did not advance any further.
