= 1968 NCAA University Division wrestling championships =

American collegiate wrestling tournament

1968 NCAA University Division Wrestling Championships
Tournament information
- Sport: College wrestling
- Location: State College, Pennsylvania
- Dates: March 21, 1968–March 23, 1968
- Host: Penn State University
- Venue: Rec Hall

Final positions
- Champions: Oklahoma State (26th title)
- 1st runners-up: Iowa State
- 2nd runners-up: Oklahoma

Tournament statistics
- Attendance: 32,300
- MVP: Dwayne Keller (Oklahoma State)

The 1968 NCAA University Division Wrestling Championships were the 38th NCAA University Division Wrestling Championships to be held. Penn State University in State College, Pennsylvania hosted the tournament at Rec Hall.

Oklahoma State took home the team championship with 81 points and having one individual champion.

Dwayne Keller of Oklahoma State was named the Most Outstanding Wrestler and Jess Lewis of Oregon State received the Gorriaran Award.

== Team results ==
Rank	School	Points
1	Oklahoma State	81
2	Iowa State	78
3	Oklahoma	74
4	Michigan State	55
5	Navy	35
T-6	Portland State	28
T-6	Lock Haven	28
T-6	Cal Poly-SLO	28
9	Michigan	27
10	Northwestern	25

== Individual finals ==
Weight class	Championship match (champion in boldface)
115 lbs	**Ken Melchior**, Lock Haven DEC Sergio Gonzales, UCLA, 9–3
123 lbs	**Dwayne Keller**, Oklahoma State DEC Rick Sanders, Portland State, 4–2
130 lbs	**Dan Gable**, Iowa State DEC David McGuire, Oklahoma, 4–1
137 lbs	**Dale Anderson**, Michigan State DEC Masaru Yatabe, Portland State, 9–5
145 lbs	**Dale Bahr**, Iowa State WBF Mike Grant, Oklahoma, 2:29
152 lbs	**Wayne Wells**, Oklahoma MAJOR John Kent, Navy, 14–4
160 lbs	**Reg Wicks**, Iowa State DEC Cleo McGlory, Oklahoma, 7–5
167 lbs	**Mike Gallego**, Fresno State DEC Lamoin Merkley, Central Washington, 4–2
177 lbs	**Bob Justice**, Colorado DEC Larry Amundson, Minnesota State-Moorehead, 4–2
191 lbs	**Nick Carollo**, Adams State DEC Tom Kline, Cal Poly-SLO, 3–3, 3–1
UNL	**Dave Porter**, Michigan DEC Jess Lewis, Oregon State, 5–4
