= Dave Porter (sportsman) =

American wrestler and football player (1946–2012)

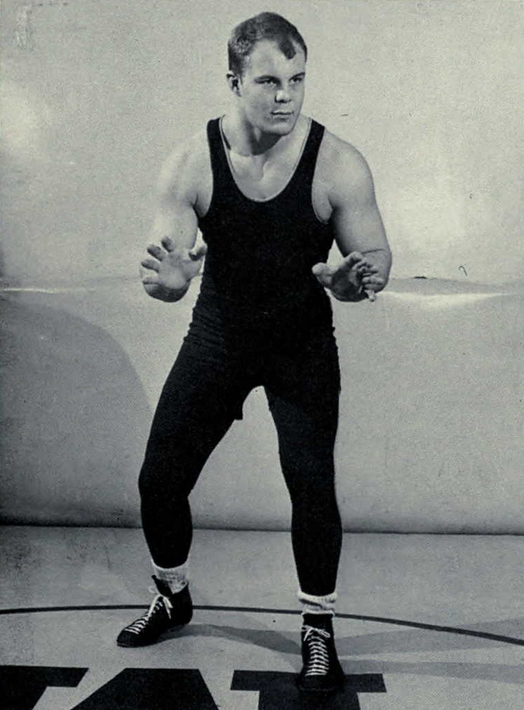
- Porter in 1967

Personal information
- Born: March 5, 1946 Lansing, Michigan, U.S.
- Died: August 25, 2012 (aged 66) Grand Ledge, Michigan, U.S.
- Occupation(s): Teacher, Coach
Medal record
Collegiate Wrestling
Representing the Michigan Wolverines
NCAA Division I Championships
Gold medal – first place	1966 Ames	Heavyweight
Gold medal – first place	1968 State College	Heavyweight
Bronze medal – third place	1967 Kent	Heavyweight

Dave Porter (March 5, 1946 – August 25, 2012), was a two-time NCAA collegiate wrestling champion and football player. He was inducted into the University of Michigan Athletic Hall of Honor in 1985.

== Student wrestler and football player ==
Porter attended Lansing Sexton High School in Lansing, Michigan. He then accepted a scholarship to attend the University of Michigan where he competed on the wrestling and football teams. As a collegiate wrestler, Porter was a three-time All-American and won NCAA championships as a heavyweight in 1966 and 1968 and compiled a three-year record of 51 wins and three losses, for a 94.4% winning percentage. In NCAA wrestling tournaments, Porter had a 13–1 record. Porter received the 1968 Michigan Senior Athlete Award and still holds several Michigan wrestling records, including 32 falls. He pinned opponents in less than 30 seconds on three occasions. He still holds the Big Ten Conference records for most consecutive falls with seven.

Porter also played as a defensive tackle during the 1966 and 1967 football seasons. He wore No. 70 and compiled 46 tackles, four pass breakups and two fumble recoveries. His best game for the football team was the 1967 game against Minnesota in which he made 11 tackles. In all, Porter won five letters at Michigan, three in wrestling and two in football.

== Later years ==
After playing in the North-South Shrine Game, Porter was drafted by the Cleveland Browns in the 1968 NFL/AFL draft. He opted to sign with the Browns rather than compete in the 1968 Summer Olympics wrestling competition. However, Porter tore a tendon and never played in an NFL game. Porter became a teacher and coach at Grand Ledge (Michigan) High School in 1970. Porter was inducted into the University of Michigan Athletic Hall of Honor in 1985.

== See also ==
- University of Michigan Athletic Hall of Honor
