= 2020 European Wrestling Championships – Men's freestyle 61 kg =

Wrestling competition

The men's freestyle 61 kg is a competition featured at the 2020 European Wrestling Championships, and was held in Rome, Italy on February 15 and February 16.

== Medalists ==
Gold	Aleksandr Bogomoev; Russia
Silver	Beka Lomtadze; Georgia
Bronze	Nikolai Okhlopkov; Romania
Bronze	Arsen Harutyunyan; Armenia

== Results ==
Legend

- F — Won by fall

1/8 finals
Beka Lomtadze (GEO)	10
Nikolai Okhlopkov (ROU)	0
Leonid Colesnic (MDA)	11
Uladzislau Koika (BLR)	0
Ivan Bileichuk (UKR)	8
Anvar Suviniitty (FIN)	1
Vladimir Egorov (MKD)	0
Arsen Harutyunyan (ARM)	6
Aleksandr Bogomoev (RUS)	10
Georgios Pilidis (GRE)	0
Vladimir Dubov (BUL)	7
Viktor Lyzen (GER)	1

Quarterfinals
Hamza Alaca (TUR)	5
Intigam Valizada (AZE)	9
Beka Lomtadze (GEO)	10
Leonid Colesnic (MDA)	0
Ivan Bileichuk (UKR)	0
Arsen Harutyunyan (ARM)	7
Aleksandr Bogomoev (RUS)	5
Vladimir Dubov (BUL)	4

Semifinals
Intigam Valizada (AZE)	1
Beka Lomtadze (GEO)	2
Arsen Harutyunyan (ARM)	6
Aleksandr Bogomoev (RUS)	7

Final
Beka Lomtadze (GEO)	2
Aleksandr Bogomoev (RUS)	3

Repechage round 1
Nikolai Okhlopkov (ROU)	6
Leonid Colesnic (MDA)	2
Georgios Pilidis (GRE)	8
Vladimir Dubov (BUL)	2

Bronze medal match
Nikolai Okhlopkov (ROU)	3
Intigam Valizada (AZE)	1
Georgios Pilidis (GRE)	0
Arsen Harutyunyan (ARM)	10

== Final standing ==
Rank	Athlete
1st place, gold medalist(s)	Aleksandr Bogomoev (RUS)
2nd place, silver medalist(s)	Beka Lomtadze (GEO)
3rd place, bronze medalist(s)	Nikolai Okhlopkov (ROU)
3rd place, bronze medalist(s)	Arsen Harutyunyan (ARM)
5	Intigam Valizada (AZE)
5	Georgios Pilidis (GRE)
7	Leonid Colesnic (MDA)
8	Vladimir Dubov (BUL)
9	Ivan Bileichuk (UKR)
10	Hamza Alaca (TUR)
11	Viktor Lyzen (GER)
12	Anvar Suviniitty (FIN)
13	Vladimir Egorov (MKD)
14	Uladzislau Koika (BLR)
