= Tom Ryan (wrestling) =

American wrestler and coach

Tom Ryan is an American former NCAA wrestler who is currently the head coach of the Ohio State Buckeyes wrestling team.

He is a member of the Hofstra University Athletics Hall of Fame.

== Coaching career ==
Ryan coached at Hofstra University from 1995 through 2006, winning 1 ECWA team title and 5 CAA titles in his time as head coach at Hofstra where he coached 65 NCAA qualifiers and produced 11 All-America honorees. During his tenure, he has coached 157 NCAA tournament qualifiers and 75 All-Americans. 6 Wrestlers have won NCAA championships under Ryan, for a total of 13 championships. He has been named Big Ten Coach of the Year 3 Times, in 2015, 2017 and 2018. And twice, he was named NCAA Coach of the Year – 2009 and 2015.

NCAA Champions under Tom Ryan

- J Jaggers (2x)
- Myles Martin
- Jesse Mendez (2x)
- Kyle Snyder (3×)
- Logan Stieber (4×)
- Nathan Tomasello

== Personal life ==
=== Family ===
Ryan and his wife Lyn have 2 sons—Jordan and Jake—and a daughter—Mackenzie. His son Jake wrestled for Ryan at Ohio State University where he was a 2-time letter winner and qualified for the NCAA Men's Tournament in 2016.

=== 2004 death of son ===
On February 16, 2004, Ryan's five year old son Teague, the second youngest of four children, suffered a heart attack and died.

=== 2024 traffic accident ===
On April 23, 2024, Ryan was driving a car in suburban Columbus, Ohio when it collided with the back of a semi-truck trailer parked on the shoulder. Ryan lost consciousness following the collision and suffered multiple fractures to his femur and patella in his left leg, as well as a torn bicep and rotator cuff. He spent 12 days at the Ohio State University Wexner Medical Center and four months in physical therapy recovering from his injuries.
