= 2016 World Wrestling Championships – Men's freestyle 61 kg =

Wrestling competition

Men's freestyle 61 kg at the 2016 World Championships
- Venue: SYMA Sports and Conference Centre
- Dates: 10 December 2016
- Competitors: 22 from 22 nations

Medalists
gold medal	Logan Stieber	United States
silver medal	Beka Lomtadze	Georgia
bronze medal	Akhmed Chakaev	Russia
bronze medal	Akhmednabi Gvarzatilov	Azerbaijan

The men's freestyle 61 kilograms is a competition featured at the 2016 World Wrestling Championships, and was held in Budapest, Hungary on 10 December.

== Results ==
Legend

- F — Won by fall

=== Final ===
Final
Logan Stieber (USA)	8
Beka Lomtadze (GEO)	4

=== Top half ===
Round of 32

Round of 16
Dimitar Ivanov (BUL)	7
Akhmed Chakaev (RUS)	17
Logan Stieber (USA)	10
Vasyl Shuptar (UKR)	0
Valodya Frangulyan (ARM)	0
Behnam Ehsanpour (IRI)	4^{F}
József Molnár (HUN)	2
Shingo Arimoto (JPN)	8

Quarterfinals
Akhmed Chakaev (RUS)	11
Logan Stieber (USA)	13
Behnam Ehsanpour (IRI)	11
Shingo Arimoto (JPN)	0

Semifinals
Logan Stieber (USA)	9
Behnam Ehsanpour (IRI)	8

=== Bottom half ===
Round of 32
Andrei Prepeliţă (MDA)	10
Recep Topal (TUR)	0
Adilet Mamataev (KGZ)	0
Beka Lomtadze (GEO)	5^{F}
Heorhi Kaliyeu (BLR)	1
Liu Minghu (CHN)	1
Tümenbilegiin Tüvshintulga (MGL)	2
Akhmednabi Gvarzatilov (AZE)	12
Temurjon Usmonohunov (UZB)	4^{F}
Krzysztof Bieńkowski (POL)	0
Daulet Niyazbekov (KAZ)	3
Bajrang Punia (IND)	12

Round of 16
Manuel Wolfer (GER)	4
Iurii Siemakin (FRA)	10
Andrei Prepeliţă (MDA)	2
Beka Lomtadze (GEO)	5
Heorhi Kaliyeu (BLR)	2
Akhmednabi Gvarzatilov (AZE)	4
Temurjon Usmonohunov (UZB)	4
Bajrang Punia (IND)	6

Quarterfinals
Iurii Siemakin (FRA)	2
Beka Lomtadze (GEO)	12
Akhmednabi Gvarzatilov (AZE)	10
Bajrang Punia (IND)	0

Semifinals
Beka Lomtadze (GEO)	12
Akhmednabi Gvarzatilov (AZE)	11

=== Repechage ===
Repechage round 1
Adilet Mamataev (KGZ)	0
Andrei Prepeliţă (MDA)	11

Repechage round 2
Vasyl Shuptar (UKR)	1
Akhmed Chakaev (RUS)	2
Andrei Prepeliţă (MDA)	1
Iurii Siemakin (FRA)	2

Bronze medals
Akhmed Chakaev (RUS)	7
Behnam Ehsanpour (IRI)	4
Iurii Siemakin (FRA)	1
Akhmednabi Gvarzatilov (AZE)	4
