= Behnam Ehsanpour =

Iranian wrestler (born 1992)

Personal information
- Native name: بهنام احسان‌پور
- Nationality: Iran
- Born: Behnam Ehsanpour; February 16, 1992 (age 34) Behshahr, Iran
- Height: 1.69 m (5 ft 7 in)

Sport
- Country: Iran
- Sport: Wrestling
- Weight class: 61 kg
- Event: Freestyle

Achievements and titles
- World finals: 5th (2016) (bronze) (2019)
- Regional finals: (gold) (2017) (gold) (2019)
Medal record
Men's freestyle wrestling
Representing Iran
World Championships
Bronze medal – third place	2019 Nur-Sultan	61 kg
World Cup
Gold medal – first place	2017 Kermanshah	61 kg
Gold medal – first place	2016 Los Angeles	61 kg
Gold medal – first place	2015 Los Angeles	61 kg
Asian Championships
Gold medal – first place	2017 New Delhi	61 kg
Gold medal – first place	2019 Xi'an	61 kg
Silver medal – second place	2015 Doha	61 kg
Silver medal – second place	2016 Bangkok	61 kg
Universiade
Silver medal – second place	2013 Kazan	60 kg
Ali Aliev Tournament
Bronze medal – third place	2014 Makhachkala	61 kg
World Junior Championships
Gold medal – first place	2012 Pattaya	60 kg
Asian Cadets Championships
Silver medal – second place	2008 Tashkent	54 kg
Bronze medal – third place	2007 Taichung	50 kg

Behnam Ehsanpour (Persian: بهنام احسان‌پور, born 16 February 1992 in Behshahr) is an Iranian wrestler. He won Bronze medal at the 2019 World Championships and silver at 2013 Summer Universiade.
