= Wrestling at the 2011 Pan American Games – Men's freestyle 55 kg =

Men's Freestyle 55 kg at the 2011 Pan American Games
- Venue: CODE II Gymnasium
- Dates: October 23
- Competitors: 7 from 7 nations

Medalists
| Gold medal | Juan Ramírez Beltré | Dominican Republic |
| Silver medal | Obe Blanc | United States |
| Bronze medal | Steven Takahashi | Canada |
| Bronze medal | Juan Valverde | Ecuador |

The men's freestyle 55 kg competition of the wrestling events at the 2011 Pan American Games in Guadalajara, Mexico, was held on October 23 at the CODE II Gymanasium. The defending champion was Henry Cejudo from the United States.

This freestyle wrestling competition consisted of a single-elimination tournament, with a repechage used to determine the winner of two bronze medals. The two finalists faced off for gold and silver medals. Each wrestler who lost to one of the two finalists moved into the repechage, culminating in a pair of bronze medal matches featuring the semifinal losers each facing the remaining repechage opponent from their half of the bracket.

Each bout consisted of up to three rounds, lasting two minutes apiece. The wrestler who scored more points in each round was the winner of that rounds; the bout finished when one wrestler had won two rounds (and thus the match).

== Schedule ==
All times are Central Standard Time (UTC-6).

| Date | Time | Round |
|---|---|---|
| October 23, 2011 | 10:08 | Quarterfinals |
| October 23, 2011 | 11:04 | Semifinals |
| October 23, 2011 | 18:00 | Bronze medal matches |
| October 23, 2011 | 18:08 | Final |

== Results ==
=== Main bracket ===
Quarterfinals
Steven Takahashi (CAN) | 1 | 4
Andre Quispe (CHI) | 1 | 1
Juan Ramírez Beltré (DOM) | 7 | 3
Luis Orantes (GUA) | 0 | 0
Juan Valverde (ECU) | 3 | 6
Fernando Paredes (VEN) | 2 | 0

Semifinals
Obe Blanc (USA) | 2 | 6
Steven Takahashi (CAN) | 0 | 0
Juan Ramírez Beltré (DOM) | 6
Juan Valverde (ECU) | 1

Finals
Obe Blanc (USA) | 0 | 1
Juan Ramírez Beltré (DOM) | 1 | 2

=== Repechage round ===
Two bronze medals were awarded.

| Repechage round 1 | Bronze Medal Bout |
| | Bye |
| Steven Takahashi (CAN) | Steven Takahashi (CAN) |
| Bye |

| Repechage round 1 | Bronze Medal Bout |
| | Juan Valverde (ECU) | 2 3 |
| Luis Orantes (GUA) | Luis Orantes (GUA) | 4 1 |
| Bye |
