= Beka Lomtadze =

Georgian freestyle wrestler

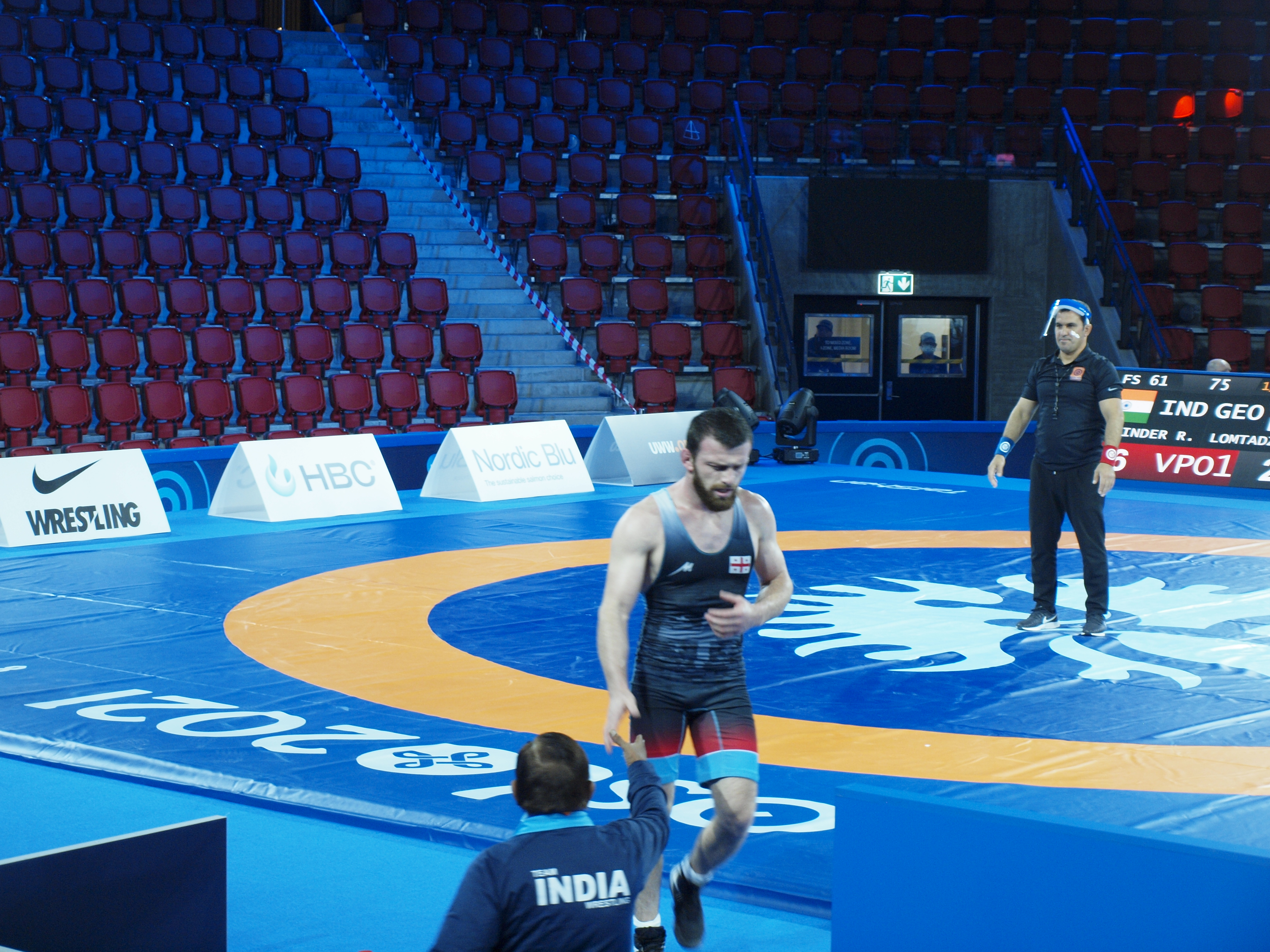

Personal information
- Nationality: Georgia
- Born: November 23, 1991 (age 34)
- Height: 165 cm (5.41 ft)
- Weight: 65 kg (143 lb)
- Website: Official Instagram Profile

Sport
- Country: (Georgia (country)) Georgia
- Sport: Wrestling
- Weight class: 61 kg
- Event: Freestyle Wrestling
Medal record
Men's freestyle wrestling
Representing Georgia
World Championships
Gold medal – first place	2019 Nur-Sultan	61 kg
Silver medal – second place	2016 Budapest	61 kg
European Games
Silver medal – second place	2015 Baku	61 kg
European Wrestling Championships
Silver medal – second place	2018 Kaspiysk	61 kg
Silver medal – second place	2019 Bucharest	61 kg
Silver medal – second place	2020 Rome	61 kg
Bronze medal – third place	2021 Warsaw	61 kg

Beka Lomtadze (born November 23, 1991) is a Georgian freestyle wrestler competing in the 61 kg division. Lomtadze began wrestling at the age of 13 in his home country of Georgia. He won gold medal in 2019 world championships in Nur-Sultan and silver 2016 world championships in Budapest.

He competed in the 65 kg event at the 2022 World Wrestling Championships held in Belgrade, Serbia.
