= Muhammad Bilal =

Pakistani wrestler (born 1995)

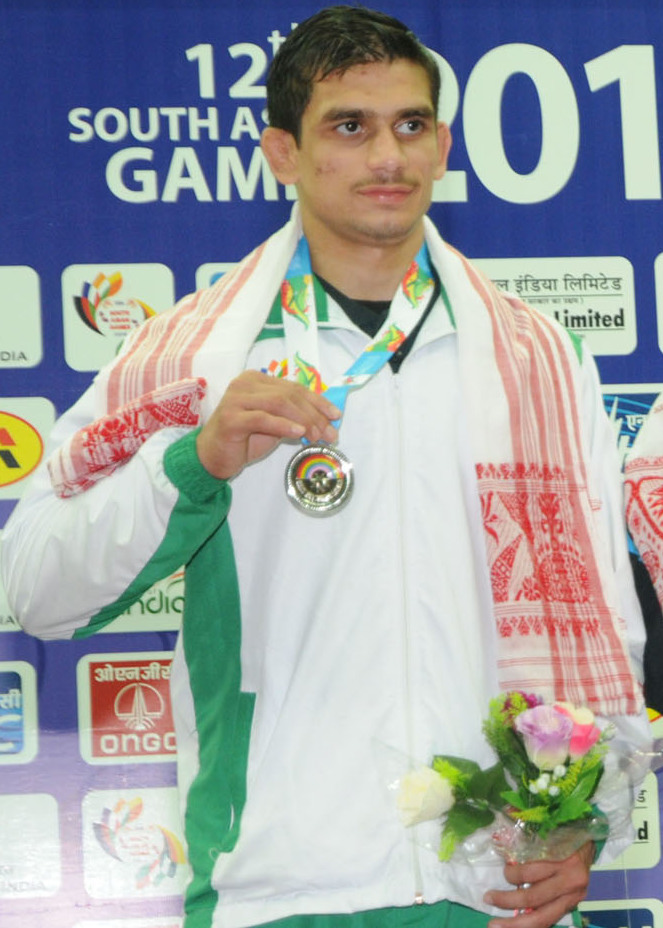
- Ravinder (India) won the gold medal, Mohammad Bilal (Pakistan) won the silver medal, Faisal (Afghanistan) and Jaimangal Yadav (Nepal) won bronze medal in 57kg Men’s wrestling, at 12th South Asian Games-2016, in Dispur, Guwahati on February 06, 2016.

Personal information
- Nationality: Pakistani
- Born: 24 September 1995 (age 30) Gujranwala, Punjab, Pakistan

Sport
- Country: Pakistan
- Sport: Freestyle wrestling
- Event: 57 kg
Medal record
Representing Pakistan
Men's Freestyle Wrestling
Commonwealth Games
Bronze medal – third place	2018 Gold Coast	57 kg

Muhammad Bilal (born 24 September 1995) is a Pakistani wrestler. He won bronze medal in 2018 Commonwealth Games. He won the match on a one-sided score of 6:1 in 57-kg freestyle wrestling competition. He is from Gujranwala.

He competed at the 2024 Asian Wrestling Olympic Qualification Tournament in Bishkek, Kyrgyzstan hoping to qualify for the 2024 Summer Olympics in Paris, France. He was eliminated in his first match and he did not qualify for the Olympics.

== Major results ==
Year	Tournament	Venue	Result	Event
2014	Asian Games	Incheon, South Korea	13th	Freestyle 57 kg
2015	Asian Championships	Doha, Qatar	11th	Freestyle 57 kg
2016	Asian Championships	Bangkok, Thailand	14th	Freestyle 57 kg
2016	Commonwealth Championships	Singapore, Singapore	2nd	Freestyle 57 kg
2016	Commonwealth Championships	Singapore, Singapore	3rd	Greco-Roman 60 kg
2017	Islamic Solidarity Games	Baku, Azerbaijan	7th	Freestyle 57 kg
2017	Commonwealth Championships	Johannesburg, South Africa	3rd	Freestyle 57 kg
2017	Commonwealth Championships	Johannesburg, South Africa	3rd	Greco-Roman 60 kg
2018	Commonwealth Games	Gold Coast, Australia	3rd	Freestyle 57 kg
