= Wrestling at the 1928 Summer Olympics – Men's freestyle bantamweight =

Men's bantamweight freestyle wrestling at the Games of the IX Olympiad
- Venue: Krachtsportgebouw
- Dates: July 30–August 1, 1928
- Competitors: 8 from 8 nations

Medalists
1st place, gold medalist(s)		Kaarlo Mäkinen	Finland
2nd place, silver medalist(s)		Edmond Spapen	Belgium
3rd place, bronze medalist(s)		James Trifunov	Canada

The men's freestyle bantamweight was a freestyle wrestling event held as part of the Wrestling at the 1928 Summer Olympics programme. It was the fourth appearance of the event. Bantamweight was the lightest category, including wrestlers weighing up to 56 kilograms. Kaarlo Mäkinen, the silver medalist at the previous Games, won the event.

== Results ==
Source: Official results; Wudarski

=== Gold medal round ===
Quarterfinals
Amédée Piguet (SUI)	W
Arthur Ford (AUS)	L
Robert Hewitt (USA)	W
Michel Rozan (FRA)	L
Kaarlo Mäkinen (FIN)	W
Harold Sansum (GBR)	L
Edmond Spapen (BEL)	W
James Trifunov (CAN)	L

Semifinals
Amédée Piguet (SUI)	L
Robert Hewitt (USA)	W
Kaarlo Mäkinen (FIN)	W
Edmond Spapen (BEL)	L

Final
Robert Hewitt (USA)	L
Kaarlo Mäkinen (FIN)	W

=== Silver medal round ===
Semifinals		Final
Harold Sansum (GBR)	W
Robert Hewitt (USA)	L	Harold Sansum (GBR)	L
		Edmond Spapen (BEL)	W

=== Bronze medal round ===
Semifinals	Final
	James Trifunov (CAN)	W
	Harold Sansum (GBR)	L
