= Rahul Aware =

Indian freestyle wrestler

Rahul Balasaheb Aware
Personal information
- Nationality: Indian
- Born: Patoda, Beed, Maharashtra

Sport
- Country: India
- Sport: Freestyle wrestling
- Event: 57 kg / 61 kg
Medal record
Representing India
Men's Freestyle Wrestling
World Championships
Bronze medal – third place	2019 Nur-Sultan	61 kg
Asian Championships
Bronze medal – third place	2011 Tashkent	55 kg
Bronze medal – third place	2019 Xi'an	61 kg
Bronze medal – third place	2020 New Delhi	61 kg
Commonwealth Games
Gold medal – first place	2018 Gold Coast	57 kg
Commonwealth Championship
Gold medal – first place	2011 Melbourne	57 kg
Yasar Dogu Tournament
Silver medal – second place	2025 Kocaeli	57 kg
Grand Prix
Bronze medal – third place	2025 Budapest	57 kg

Rahul Balasaheb Aware is an Indian male freestyle wrestler who competes in the men's freestyle 57 kg category. He won the gold medal in the 57 kg division at the 2018 Commonwealth Games. He was a student of the late Olympian Harishchandra Birajdar. At present, he is being trained by his guru and father in law Kaka Pawar. Currently he is employed in the Maharashtra Police as a deputy superintendent of police. He is fondly called "Nana" (Elderly brother) by his friends and family.

He was awarded the Arjuna Award in 2020 for his contribution to wrestling.

== Career ==
2008 Youth Commonwealth Pune India – Rahul Won the Gold Medal

2009 Junior Asian Wrestling Championship Won the Gold Medal

2009 Junior World Wrestling Championship Silver Medal

2011 Commonwealth Wrestling championship Gold medal

2011 Asian wrestling championship won Bronze medal

2017 Commonwealth wrestling championship Silver medal

2018 21st Commonwealth Games gold medal in the 57 kg freestyle

2019 world ranking series wrestling tournament won Bronze medal

2019 Yasar Dogu World ranking series won Gold medal

2019 Asian wrestling championship won Bronze medal

2019 World wrestling championship won Bronze medal

2020 Asian Wrestling Championship Bronze medal in the 61 kg freestyle

7 Time Gold medalist in National Championships

=== 2011 Asian Wrestling Championship ===
At the tournament in Tashkent, Uzbekistan, Rahul won the bronze medal in the men's freestyle 55 kg category.

In the first round, Rahul faced Rasul Kaliev of Kazakhstan and beat him 3:1. In the next round, he lost 1:3 to Yang Kyong-il of North Korea. In the repechage round, his first opponent was Nasibulla Kurbanov of Uzbekistan and Rahul beat him 3:1. He was able to contest for the bronze medal against Firas Al Ali Rifaee from Syria and won 5:0.

=== 2011 Commonwealth Wrestling Championships ===
At the tournament in Melbourne, Rahul won the gold medal in the men's freestyle 55 kg category, beating Gilbert Musonza of Canada and Craig McKenna of Scotland.

=== 2016 Olympics ===
Sports Minister Sarbananda Sonowal announced earlier in April 2015, that 45 athletes will be provided financial support under the 'Target Olympic Podium' programme devised by the Indian Government. The Minister said recent performance, consistency in performance, performance vis-a-vis international standards were among the criteria followed while selecting the athletes.

Rahul, along with fellow wrestlers Sushil Kumar (men's freestyle 74 kg), Yogeshwar Dutt (men's freestyle 66 kg), Amit Kumar (men's freestyle 57 kg) get Rs. 7.5 million each, while Bajrang (men's freestyle 66 kg), Babita Kumari (women's 53 kg) and Vinesh Phogat (women's 48 kg) will be awarded RS. 4.5 million each.

=== 2018 Commonwealth Games ===
Rahul won a gold medal in the 2018 Commonwealth Games at Gold Coast. In a gripping final bout against Canada's Steven Takahashi, Aware won 15-7 despite struggling with injury in the latter half. This was the first gold for Aware in CWG.

== Other titles ==
- Golden Grand Prix, 2010 – Bronze
- Dave Schultz Memorial Tournament, 2012, Silver
