= Wrestling at the 2018 Commonwealth Games – Men's freestyle 57 kg =

Wrestling – Men's freestyle 57 kg at the 2018 Commonwealth Games
- Venue: Carrara Sports and Leisure Centre
- Dates: 12 April 2018
- Competitors: 12 from 11 nations

Medalists
gold medal	Rahul Aware	India
silver medal	Steven Takahashi	Canada
bronze medal	Ebikewenimo Welson	Nigeria
bronze medal	Muhammad Bilal	Pakistan

The men's 57 kg freestyle wrestling competition at the 2018 Commonwealth Games in Gold Coast, Australia was held on 12 April at the Carrara Sports and Leisure Centre.

This freestyle wrestling competition consists of a single-elimination tournament, with a repechage used to determine the winner of two bronze medals. The two finalists face off for gold and silver medals. Each wrestler who loses to one of the two finalists moves into the repechage, culminating in a pair of bronze medal matches featuring the semifinal losers each facing the remaining repechage opponent from their half of the bracket.

== Results ==
- F — Won by fall

=== Main bracket ===
Round of 16
Charles Fernando (SRI)	12
Ross Connelly (SCO)	6
Muhammad Bilal (PAK)	12
Gary Giordimaina (MLT)	2
Lowe Bingham (NRU)	6
Thomas Cicchini (AUS)	9
Rahul Aware (IND)	11
George Ramm (ENG)	0

Quarterfinals
Steven Takahashi (CAN)	6
Jan Combrinck (RSA)	1
Ebikewenimo Welson (NGR)	10
Viorel Etko (SCO)	0
Charles Fernando (SRI)	2
Muhammad Bilal (PAK)	12
Thomas Cicchini (AUS)	0
Rahul Aware (IND)	10

Semifinals
Steven Takahashi (CAN)	6^{F}
Ebikewenimo Welson (NGR)	9
Muhammad Bilal (PAK)	8
Rahul Aware (IND)	12

Final
Steven Takahashi (CAN)	7
Rahul Aware (IND)	15

=== Repechage ===
Repechage first round
George Ramm (ENG)	11
Thomas Ciccini (AUS)	1

Bronze medal match
Jan Combrinck (RSA)	2
Ebikewenimo Welson (NGR)	5
George Ramm (ENG)	0
Muhammad Bilal (PAK)	6
