= Robert Hewitt =

American wrestler (1906–1978)

Personal information
- Born: July 27, 1906 Traverse City, Michigan, U.S.
- Died: January 18, 1978 (aged 71) Houghton Lake, Michigan, U.S.

Sport
- Country: United States
- Sport: Wrestling
- Events: Freestyle and Folkstyle
- College team: Michigan
- Team: USA
Medal record
Collegiate Wrestling
Representing the Michigan Wolverines
NCAA Championships
Silver medal – second place	1928 Ames	125 lb
Silver medal – second place	1929 Columbus	125 lb

Robert Hewitt (July 27, 1906 – January 18, 1978) was an American wrestler. He competed in the men's freestyle bantamweight at the 1928 Summer Olympics. Collegiately, Hewitt wrestled at the University of Michigan and was a two-time NCAA finalist.
