= Rick Bay =

American head coach and gridiron football player

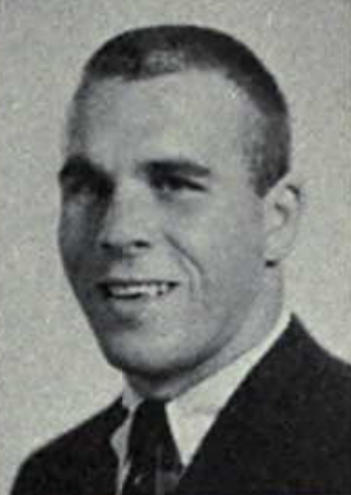
- Bay from 1965 Michiganensian

Biographical details
- Born: c. 1942

Playing career

Football
- 1961–1964: Michigan

Wrestling
- 1961–1965: Michigan
- Position: Quarterback (football)

Coaching career (HC unless noted)

Wrestling
- 1965–1969: Michigan (assistant)
- 1970–1974: Michigan

Administrative career (AD unless noted)
- 1976–1980: US Wrestling Federation (president)
- 1981–1984: Oregon
- 1984–1987: Ohio State
- 1988: New York Yankees (EVP/COO)
- 1988–1991: Minnesota
- 1992: Cleveland Indians (president/CEO)
- 1995–2003: San Diego State

Head coaching record
- Overall: 43–5–3

Accomplishments and honors

Championships
- 1 Big Ten (1973)

Richard M. Bay (born 1941 or 1942) is an American former football player, wrestler, college athletics administrator, Major League Baseball executive. He was a football player and wrestler at the University of Michigan from 1961 to 1965. He also served as Michigan's head wrestling coach from 1970 to 1974 and as the president of the United States Wrestling Federation from 1976 to 1980. He has also held positions as athletic directors at University of Oregon (1981–1984), Ohio State University (1984–1987), University of Minnesota (1988–1991) and San Diego State University (1995–2003). He was executive vice president and chief operating officer of the New York Yankees for several months in 1988 and president and chief executive officer of the Cleveland Indians in the early 1990s.

== Athlete ==
Bay grew up in Waukegan, Illinois, and attended the University of Michigan. He was a three-time Illinois state high school wrestling champion and all-state quarterback in football. In 2000, he was named by the Chicago Tribune to the Illinois high school All-Century team. Was a quarterback for the Michigan Wolverines football team from 1961 to 1964. He was also a member of the Michigan wrestling team under Cliff Keen. He won two Big Ten Conference wrestling championships. He won his first conference championship in 1963 in the 157-pound classification. Bay was also selected as a fifth-team All-American in 1963. He won his second Big Ten championship in 1965 in the 167-pound classification, pinning Rich Callaghan of Illinois in 1:37 in the championship match. He was also selected as the Big Ten Tournament Outstanding Wrestler in 1965. He was also selected as the Michigan wrestling team captain for the 1964–65 season.

Bay was inducted into the National Wrestling Hall of Fame, Michigan Chapter, in 2008, and the University of Michigan Athletic Hall of Honor in 2000.

== Coaching and administration ==
=== University of Michigan ===
After graduating from the University of Michigan in 1965, Bay remained in Ann Arbor as an assistant wrestling coach for four years. In 1970, he took over as Michigan's head wrestling coach following the retirement of Cliff Keen. He remained as Michigan's head wrestling coach for four years. In his last two season at head wrestling coach, his teams were undefeated in the regular season, won back-to-back Big Ten Conference championships, were ranked No. 1 in the country, and finished third and second in the NCAA Tournament. He resigned in 1974 after being named College Wrestling Coach of the Year.

==== Head coaching record ====
Record table
Season	Team	Overall	Conference	Standing	Postseason
Michigan Wolverines (Big Ten Conference) (1971–1974)
1970–71	Michigan	8–2–2	6–1–1	3rd	14th
1971–72	Michigan	9–3–1	7–1–1	3rd	15th
1972–73	Michigan	12–0	9–0	1st	3rd
1973–74	Michigan	14–0	9–0	2nd	2nd
Michigan:		43–5–3	31–2–2		
Total:		43–5–3			
National champion Postseason invitational champion Conference regular season champion Conference regular season and conference tournament champion Division regular season champion Division regular season and conference tournament champion Conference tournament champion

=== U.S. Wrestling Federation ===
After stepping down as Michigan's wrestling coach, Bay was employed by the University of Michigan Alumni Association, eventually serving as an associate executive director. From 1976 to 1980, Bay served as the president of the United States Wrestling Federation. In 1980, he was named USA Wrestling Man of the Year.

=== University of Oregon ===
In June 1981, Bay was hired as the athletic director at the University of Oregon. He continued in that position until 1984. Bay took the position amid an NCAA investigation of past rules violations, including fake school credits and the creation of a secret fund at a local travel agency. In December 1981, the NCAA imposed sanctions that included a two-year probation on the football program, no bowl games, and the loss of 12 football scholarships over two years. Bay said at the time that the sanctions would handicap the program, "but it won't cripple us. We will continue to be competitive in all areas, including those specifically penalized."

Bay's time at Oregon was also marked by disputes with track coach Bill Dellinger and with Nike founders Phil Knight and Bill Bowerman. Bay first drew fire when he terminated a practice whereby Nike supplied free equipment to members of the track team. Bay asserted that the practice violated NCAA rules, but Phil Knight angrily protested. In his memoirs, Bay wrote that he replied: "Mr. Knight, I agree that you have every right to send our guys free equipment. I can't stop you. But every time you do, I'll have to make that athlete ineligible and he'll have to send that stuff right back to Nike." Bay also refused to accept a proposed donation from Bowerman to build a new athletic building on grounds that Bowerman wanted to control the use of the building, and Bay refused to accept the condition. The building was not built until after Bay left Oregon.

=== Ohio State ===
In May 1984, Bay was hired as the athletic director at Ohio State University. He announced at the start of his tenure that he would take a strong stance on academics and stated that he expected his coaches and staff to work within the rules and that he expected the Buckeyes to be strong contenders in all 30 men's and women's sports. During Bay's four years as athletic director, the 1984 Ohio State Buckeyes football team won the Big Ten Conference championship in 1984 with a 9–3 record. The 1985 team also compiled a 9–3 record, defeated BYU in the Florida Citrus Bowl, and finished the season ranked No. 11 in the Coaches Poll. 1986 team was Big Ten co-champion, compiled a 10–3 record, defeated Texas A&M in the Cotton Bowl, and finished the season ranked No. 6 in the final Coaches Poll. After the 1987 Buckeyes compiled a 6–4–1 record, head football coach Earle Bruce was fired. Bay refused to carry out the order to fire Bruce who had an 81–26–1 (.755) record and had won or shared four Big Ten championships. Bay resigned in protest. Bay said at the time, "It's a shame. It's a dark day for Ohio State." He also commented more broadly on the skewed values dominating college football:

"We graduate our players and win about 75 percent of the time. I don't think you can find a better package than that. Major college athletics is out of perspective in general. We get far too much attention and credit when we do well; we get far too much criticism when we fall short. It's just not that important. It shouldn't be that important in the context of everything that happens around us. But it is -- that's human nature -- and we know that going in, and so we have to live with the consequences."

Bay was widely praised for his principled handling of the situation and for rejecting the win-at-all-costs approach to college athletics.

=== New York Yankees ===
In February 1988, he was hired as the executive vice president and chief operating officer of the New York Yankees. He was given responsibility for everyday administrative operation of the team. Bay resigned in early June 1988, after only four months with the Yankees. Lou Piniella had resigned one week earlier as the club's general manager. Bay complained that owner George Steinbrenner was trying to usurp his power, and he left the Yankees to join the StarBright Group Inc., a television production company. Years later, Bay reflected on his time with Steinbrenner: "He gave me a job when I didn't have one, but I knew Steinbrenner's track record. ... But there is a side to George Steinbrenner most people don't see. He's put a lot of well-known athletes down on their luck on his payroll ... and some of them had little to do. ... It was a fascinating time."

=== University of Minnesota ===
In December 1988, Bay was hired as the men's athletic director at the University of Minnesota. Bay replaced Paul Giel, who had been athletic director for 16 years. Giel was fired after an NCAA investigation found 40 rule violations in the school's athletic department and imposed sanctions on the university's athletic program. Bay remained Minnesota's men's athletic director for nearly three years. During his tenure, Bay secured approval of a program to invest $41 million in improvement of the university's sports facilities that included the construction of Mariucci Arena and renovation of Williams Arena. However, an NCAA investigation of misconduct preceding Bay's hiring continued during Bay's tenure. In December 1990, the NCAA issued findings alleging major violations by the university in improperly paying cash, extending loans and conferring other benefits on athletes. Bay noted that most of the alleged violations occurred before 1988 and related to the activities of the former acting director of the university's office of minority and special student affairs, who had been fired and convicted in 1989 of stealing approximately $200,000 from the university. In January 1991, Bay announced that the university had issued a 300-page response to the NCAA in which admitted 18 of the 21 violations, but argued that no penalty should be imposed.

=== Cleveland Indians ===
In September 1991, Bay was hired as president of the Cleveland Indians baseball team, and took over in January 1992. The year before Bay joined the club, the 1991 Indians finished in last place with a 57–105 (.352) record. During Bay's only season as CEO, the 1992 Indians improved by 19 wins over the prior year, finished in fourth place in the American League East, and compiled a 76-86 (.469) record. Based on the marked improvement in the tam's performance, the Indians were selected by Baseball America as Major League Baseball's "Organization of the Year" at the end of the 1992 season. Despite the club's improvement, Bay clashed with team owner Dick Jacobs over running the team, and Bay resigned in November 1992 after only 11 months with the club.

=== San Diego State ===
In January 1995, Bay was hired as the athletic director at San Diego State University. He remained in that position from 1995 to 2003. During his tenure, the university built a new basketball arena (Cox Arena), a new baseball stadium (Tony Gwynn Stadium), the Aztec Athletic Center, and a track and soccer field called the Sports Deck. In February 1999, he hired Steve Fisher as the university's head basketball coach. Through the 2012 season, Fisher had compiled a 258–157 record at SDSU and five appearances in the NCAA Tournament.

Bay's resigned under pressure from the university administration after a California State University auditor's report found that there was a pattern of mismanagement within the school's equipment room and lax oversight of the department. San Diego State president Stephen Weber said at the time that Bay would have been fired had he not resigned. Weber stated, "I don't think Rick has the same views about the legitimacy of the audit or the scope of its implications as I do." Bay said he could not sign off on an audit that he knew to be flawed. He had asked for evidence of some of the allegations, but none was provided. "The university said in the audit, 'We concur,' on every point even though I'm sitting there as their athletic director and I have pretty good reason to believe this is not true," Bay said. "The audit should at least be investigated before we concur. That is where the President Weber and I got into some head knocking."
