= Golden Grand Prix Ivan Yarygin 2019 – Men's freestyle 61 kg =

The men's freestyle 61 kg is a competition featured at the Golden Grand Prix Ivan Yarygin 2019, and was held in Krasnoyarsk, Russia on 24 January 2019.

== Medalists ==
Gold	(Dagestan) Magomedrasul Idrisov
Silver	(Yakutia) Nikolai Okhlopkov
Bronze	(Dagestan) Ramazan Ferzaliev
Bronze	(Yakutia) Eduard Grigoriev

== Results ==
Legend

- F — Won by fall
- WO — Won by walkover (forfeit)

=== Final ===
Final
(Dagestan) Magomedrasul Idrisov	7
(Yakutia) Nikolai Okhlopkov	0

=== Top half ===
Round of 8
Mekan Orazow (TKM)	4
Minghu Liu (CHN)	14
Munkh Altansuvd (MGL)	2
Chinzorig Tsermaa (MGL)	3
Myrat Hojanepasov (TKM)	0
(Yakutia) Nikolai Okhlopkov	10
(Yakutia) Eduard Grigoriev	10
Aleyner Guilarte (CUB)	0
Joseph Colon (USA)	10
Cory Clark (USA)	0

Round of 4
(Dagestan) Ramazan Ferzaliev	2
(Dagestan) Magomedrasul Idrisov	5
Otgonbaatar Gansukh (MGL)	5
Minghu Liu (CHN)	4
Chinzorig Tsermaa (MGL)	2
(Yakutia) Nikolai Okhlopkov	12
(Yakutia) Eduard Grigoriev	10
Joseph Colon (USA)	1

Semifinals
(Dagestan) Magomedrasul Idrisov	8
Otgonbaatar Gansukh (MGL)	2
(Yakutia) Nikolai Okhlopkov	12
(Yakutia) Eduard Grigoriev	5

Final
(Dagestan) Magomedrasul Idrisov	7
(Yakutia) Nikolai Okhlopkov	0

== Repechage ==
Repechage
Myrat Hojanepasov (TKM)	0
Chinzorig Tsermaa (MGL)	11

Bronze medals
(Dagestan) Ramazan Ferzaliev	10
Otgonbaatar Gansukh (MGL)	0
Chinzorig Tsermaa (MGL)	0
(Yakutia) Eduard Grigoriev	5
