= Rozan (surname) =

Rozan is a surname. Notable people with the surname include:

- Michel Rozan (1906–1974), French wrestler
- Micheline Rozan (1928–2018), French producer
- S. J. Rozan (born 1950), American architect and writer
- Varel Rozan (born 1992), Congolese footballer

== See also ==
- DeMar DeRozan (born 1989), American basketball player
