= Perry Martter =

American wrestler

Personal information
- Born: February 19, 1901 Coshocton, Ohio, U.S.
- Died: June 13, 1954 (aged 53) Los Angeles, California, U.S.

Sport
- Country: United States
- Sport: Wrestling
- Events: Freestyle and Folkstyle
- College team: Ohio State
- Team: USA

Perry Martter (February 19, 1901 – June 13, 1954) was an American wrestler. He competed in the freestyle lightweight event at the 1924 Summer Olympics. In 2015, he was inducted into the Ohio State Athletics Hall of Fame.
