= Magomedrasul Idrisov =

Russian freestyle wrestler

Personal information
- Native name: Магомедрасул Мусаевич Идрисов
- Nationality: Russia
- Born: Magomedrasul Musayevich Idrisov; 8 July 1996 (age 30) Khasavyurt District, Dagestan, Russia
- Height: 160 cm (5 ft 3 in)

Sport
- Country: Russia
- Sport: Amateur wrestling
- Weight class: 61 kg
- Event: Freestyle
Medal record
Men's freestyle wrestling
Representing Russia
World Championships
Silver medal – second place	2019 Nur-Sultan	61 kg
Russian National Championships
Gold medal – first place	2019 Sochi	61 kg
Gold medal – first place	2018 Odintsovo	61 kg
Golden Grand Prix Ivan Yarygin
Gold medal – first place	2019 Krasnoyarsk	61 kg
World U23 Championships
Gold medal – first place	2018 Bucharest	61 kg
European U23 Championships
Gold medal – first place	2018 Istanbul	61 kg

Magomedrasul Musayevich Idrisov (Russian: Магомедрасул Мусаевич Идрисов, born 8 July 1996) is a Russian freestyle wrestler. He won the silver medal in the men's freestyle 61 kg event at the 2019 World Wrestling Championships held in Nur-Sultan, Kazakhstan.

== Career ==
In 2018, he won the gold medal in the men's freestyle 61 kg event both at the 2018 World U23 Wrestling Championship and the 2018 European U23 Wrestling Championship. At the 2018 Russian National Freestyle Wrestling Championships held in Odintsovo, Moscow Oblast, Russia, he won the 61 kg event.

At the Golden Grand Prix Ivan Yarygin 2019 held in Krasnoyarsk, Russia, he won the gold medal in the men's freestyle 61 kg event.

== Major results ==
Year	Tournament	Location	Result	Event
2019	World Championships	Nur-Sultan, Kazakhstan	2nd	Freestyle 61 kg
