= Logan Stieber =

American wrestler (born 1991)

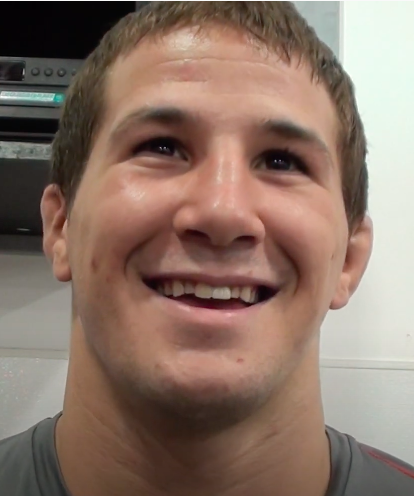
- Stieber in 2013

Personal information
- Born: January 24, 1991 (age 35) Monroeville, Ohio, U.S.
- Height: 5 ft 5 in (165 cm)
- Weight: 65 kg (143 lb)

Sport
- Country: United States
- Sport: Wrestling
- Events: Freestyle and Folkstyle
- College team: Ohio State
- Team: USA
- Coached by: Tom Ryan
Medal record
Men's freestyle wrestling
Representing the United States
World Championships
Gold medal – first place	2016 Budapest	61 kg
World Cup
Gold medal – first place	2018 Iowa City	Team
Silver medal – second place	2017 Kermanshah	Team
Pan American Championships
Gold medal – first place	2018 Lima	65 kg
Bronze medal – third place	2017 Salvador	61 kg
Junior World Championships
Silver medal – second place	2011 Bucharest	60 kg
Men's collegiate wrestling
Representing the Ohio State Buckeyes
NCAA Division I Championships
Gold medal – first place	2012 St. Louis	133 lb
Gold medal – first place	2013 Des Moines	133 lb
Gold medal – first place	2014 Oklahoma City	141 lb
Gold medal – first place	2015 St. Louis	141 lb
Big Ten Championships
Gold medal – first place	2012 West Lafayette	133 lb
Gold medal – first place	2013 Champaign	133 lb
Gold medal – first place	2014 Madison	141 lb
Gold medal – first place	2015 Columbus	141 lb

Logan Stieber (born January 24, 1991) is an American former freestyle and folkstyle wrestler, who competed internationally at 61 and 65 kilograms. In the Olympic year of 2016, he won the non-Olympic weight World Championship at 61 kg, and in 2018, he won a Pan American title.

In folkstyle, Stieber is one of the most accomplished collegiate wrestlers in the history of the NCAA, having won four NCAA Division I national championships, four Big Ten Conference championships, and the Dan Hodge Trophy for the Ohio State Buckeyes during his career.

In 2024, Stieber was inducted into the National Wrestling Hall of Fame as a Distinguished Member.

== Education and career ==
Stieber went to Monroeville High School, in Monroeville, Ohio, and won five Ohio High School Athletic Association (OHSAA) state wrestling championships (four individually, and a team title for Monroeville in 2010), losing only once his entire high school career, to David Taylor of St. Paris Graham. He was named the Junior Hodge Trophy winner for 2010. Stieber finished his Monroeville career with a record of 184-1, and his 179 straight wins is still an OHSAA record as of 2016.

Stieber later committed to Ohio State University, where he became one of the most decorated wrestlers in NCAA history.

Already a four-time Big Ten Champion, on March 21, 2015, Stieber became only the fourth wrestler in NCAA history to win four individual National Championships. He also led the Ohio State Buckeyes to their first team National Championship for wrestling in school history.

Stieber finished his NCAA career with a record of 119-3.

Following college, Stieber went on record as stating he would be training in hopes of joining Team USA for the 2016 Summer Olympics. Stieber would later represent Team USA on its 2017 World Team. Stieber retired in April 2019 and started coaching at the Ohio RTC.

== Championships, Honors and accomplishments ==
=== High school ===
- Four-time OHSAA Division III State Wrestling Champion
  - 2007, 2008, 2009, 2010: individual
  - 2010: team (as a member of the Monroeville Eagles)
- 2008: FILA Junior National Champion
- 2010: Junior Dan Hodge Trophy winner

=== College ===
- Four-time Big Ten Champion
  - 2012, 2013, 2014, 2015: individual
  - 2015: team (as a member of the Ohio State Buckeyes)
- Four-time NCAA Division I National Champion:
  - 2012, 2013, 2014, 2015: individual
  - 2015: team (as a member of the Ohio State Buckeyes)
- 2012: Big Ten Freshman of the Year (wrestling)
- 2015: Dan Hodge Trophy winner
- 2015: NCAA Most Dominant Wrestler
- 2015: National Wrestling Coaches Association (NWCA) Most Outstanding Wrestler

=== Senior level - Freestyle ===
- 2016: World Champion
- 2018: World Cup Champion
- 2018: Pan American Champion

=== Honors ===
Stieber was inducted as a Distinguished Member of the National Wrestling Hall of Fame in 2024

== See also ==
- List of Ohio State University people
