= Clement Spapen =

Belgian wrestler (born 1906)

Medal record

Men's freestyle wrestling

Representing Belgium

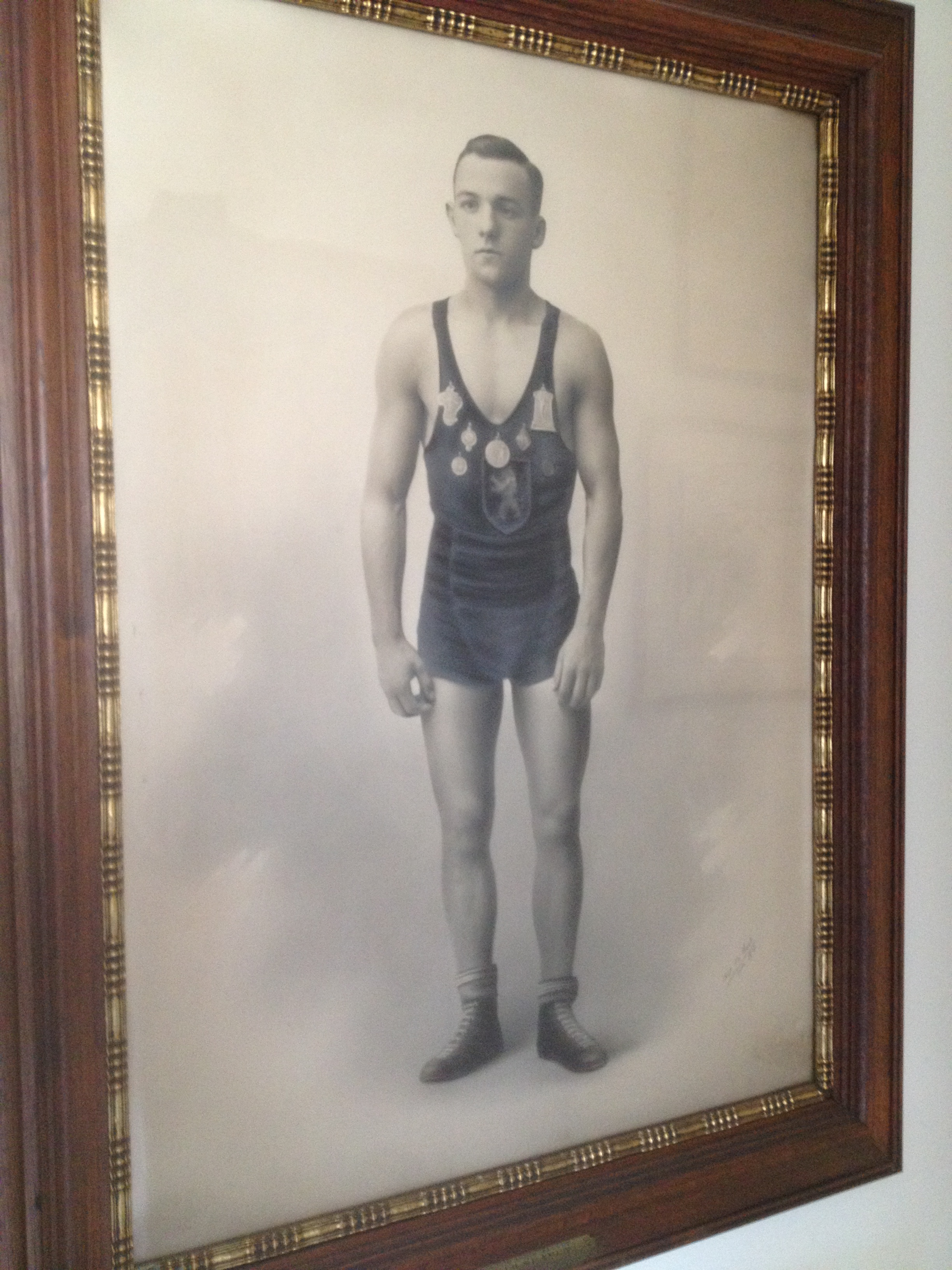
Olympic Games Clement Spapen
Silver medal – second place	1928 Amsterdam	Bantamweight

Clementius Herman Maria "Clement" Spapen (born 22 November 1906) was a Belgian wrestler. He was Olympic silver medalist in Freestyle wrestling in 1928. He was born in Antwerp.
