= Mark Johnson (wrestler) =

American wrestler and coach

Mark Johnson is a former Olympic wrestler and two time NCAA All-American. He was the head coach at Oregon State University (1990–1992) and the University of Illinois (1992–2009), compiling a career record of 223-48-5 (.817). He has the most wins in University of Illinois history and was twice selected as Big Ten Coach of the Year (2001 and 2005).

Johnson was born in Rock Island, Illinois. He graduated in 1973 from Alleman High School in Rock Island, where he placed second in the state in wrestling (167 lbs) and was an All-State football player. Johnson continued his wrestling career at the University of Michigan, where he was twice an NCAA finalist and Academic All-American.

He was a U.S. champion and qualified for the 1980 Olympic Greco-Roman team. Due to the Soviet Union's invasion of Afghanistan, the United States boycotted the 1980 Summer Olympics and Johnson wasn't able to compete. Along with the other Olympians, he received medals from the United States Olympic Committee and the United States Congress and met President Jimmy Carter.

He is the CEO of the Stephens Family YMCA in Champaign, Illinois, where he lives with his wife, Linda. He has two daughters, Tricia and Mackey.

== Additional sources ==
- "Alleman grad Johnson adjusts to life after coaching wrestling". Quad City Times. January 9, 2010.
