= Akhmednabi Gvarzatilov =

Azerbaijani freestyle wrestler

Personal information
- Native name: Ахмеднаби Гварзатилов
- Nationality: Azerbaijan; Russia
- Born: 23 February 1993 (age 33) Makhachkala, Dagestan, Russia
- Height: 169 cm (5 ft 7 in)

Sport
- Country: Azerbaijan
- Sport: Amateur wrestling
- Weight class: 61 kg
- Event: Freestyle
- Coached by: Ali Omarov

Achievements and titles
- World finals: (bronze) (2016)
- Regional finals: 5th(2021)
Medal record
Men's freestyle wrestling
Representing Azerbaijan
World Championships
Bronze medal – third place	2016 Budapest	61 kg
Individual World Cup
Silver medal – second place	2020 Belgrade	61 kg
World Cup
Silver medal – second place	2018 Iowa	61 kg
World Junior Championships
Gold medal – first place	2013 Sofie	60 kg
European Juniors Championships
Gold medal – first place	2012 Zagreb	60 kg
Silver medal – second place	2013 Skopje	60 kg

Akhmednabi Gvarzatilov is a Russian and Azerbaijani freestyle wrestler. He won one of the bronze medals in the men's freestyle 61 kg event at the 2016 World Wrestling Championships held in Budapest, Hungary.

In 2020, he won the silver medal in the men's 61 kg event at the Individual Wrestling World Cup held in Belgrade, Serbia.

== Achievements ==
Year	Tournament	Location	Result	Event
2016	World Championships	Budapest, Hungary	3rd	Freestyle 61 kg
