= Steven Takahashi =

Canadian freestyle wrestler

Personal information
- Full name: Steven Masao Takahashi
- Born: 8 April 1992 (age 34) London, Ontario, Canada
- Height: 166 cm (5 ft 5 in)
- Weight: 59 kg (130 lb)

Sport
- Country: Canada
- Sport: Amateur wrestling
- Event: Freestyle
Medal record
Men's freestyle wrestling
Representing Canada
Commonwealth Games
Silver medal – second place	2018 Gold Coast	57 kg
Francophone Games
Gold medal – first place	2017 Abidjan	57 kg
Silver medal – second place	2013 Nice	55 kg
Pan American Games
Bronze medal – third place	2011 Guadalajara	55 kg
Pan American Championships
Bronze medal – third place	2014 Mexico City	57 kg
Bronze medal – third place	2015 Santiago	57 kg

Steven Takahashi (born 8 April 1992) is a Canadian freestyle wrestler. He won the silver medal in the men's 57 kg event at the 2018 Commonwealth Games held in Gold Coast, Australia. He is the son of Olympic wrestler Ray Takahashi, nephew of Olympic judo competitor Phil Takahashi and coach Tina Takahashi, and grandson of influential judoka Masao Takahashi.

== Career ==
Takahashi won one of the bronze medals in the men's freestyle 55 kg event at the 2011 Pan American Games held in Guadalajara, Mexico.

In 2016, Takahashi won one of the bronze medals in the men's 57 kg event at the World University Wrestling Championships held in Çorum, Turkey. In 2017, he won the gold medal in the men's 57 kg event at the 2017 Francophone Games held in Abidjan, Ivory Coast.

== Achievements ==
Year	Tournament	Location	Result	Event
2011	Pan American Games	Guadalajara, Mexico	3rd	Freestyle 55 kg
2013	Francophone Games	Nice, France	2nd	Freestyle 55 kg
2014	Pan American Championships	Mexico City, Mexico	3rd	Freestyle 57 kg
2015	Pan American Championships	Santiago, Chile	3rd	Freestyle 57 kg
2017	Francophone Games	Abidjan, Ivory Coast	1st	Freestyle 57 kg
2018	Commonwealth Games	Gold Coast, Australia	2nd	Freestyle 57 kg
