= Andy Hrovat =

American freestyle wrestler

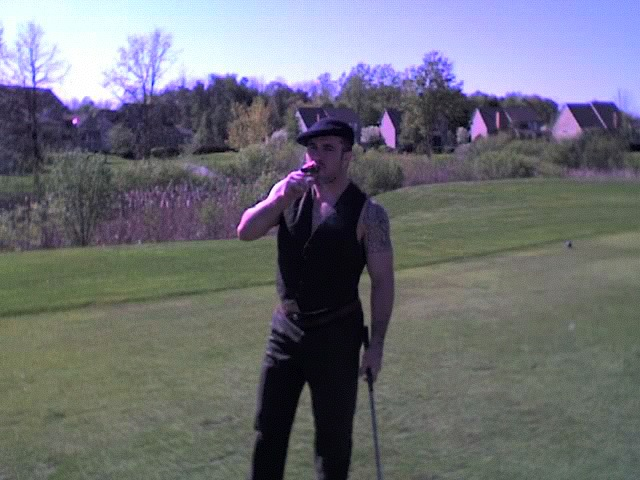
- Hrovat at a golf outing in 2007

Personal information
- Born: January 21, 1980 (age 46) Cleveland, Ohio, U.S.

Sport
- Country: United States
- Sport: Wrestling
- Events: Freestyle and Folkstyle
- College team: Michigan
- Team: USA
Medal record
Men's freestyle wrestling
Representing the United States
Pan American Games
Silver medal – second place	2007 Rio de Janeiro	84 kg

Andy Hrovat (born January 21, 1980) is an American former freestyle and folkstyle wrestler. In college, he was a 3-time NCAA wrestling All-American and later wrestled for the U.S. Team in freestyle wrestling at the 2008 Olympic Games.

== High school career ==
Hrovat wrestled scholastically at St. Edward High School in Lakewood, Ohio, where he was a two-time OHSAA state champion for coach Greg Urbas. He graduated from St. Edward in 1998.

== College career ==
Hrovat wrestled at the University of Michigan, with fellow St. Edward wrestling star Ryan Bertin. He finished with collegiate record of 132–39, among the best in Michigan history.

He achieved NCAA All-American honors three times:

- 2002: 7th Place
- 2001: 4th Place
- 2000: Tournament qualifier
- 1999: 8th Place

In addition, Big Ten honors include:

- 2002: 2nd Place
- 2001: 5th Place
- 2000: 3rd Place
- 1999: 7th Place

He graduated from Michigan with a degree in General Studies.

== Senior level career ==
=== 2006 season ===
At the 2006 FILA Wrestling World Championships, he finished in 18th place.

=== 2007 season ===
Hrovat earned a silver medal at the 2007 Pan American Games.

=== 2008 season ===
==== Qualification tournaments ====
He came in 2nd in the 2008 national tournament, losing to Mo Lawal. He avenged the loss to Mo Lawal to make the 2008 USA Olympic Team.

==== 2008 Olympics ====
Wrestling in the 84 kg weight class - freestyle, Hrovat drew a bye in the round of 16. He wrestled Cuba's Reineris Salas Perez in the round of 8, losing 3-0 1-3 2-2. The Cuban's loss to the Turkish wrestler Serhat Balcı in the quarterfinal round eliminated Hrovat from further competition in the repechage round.

=== 2009 season ===
Hrovat wrestled for New York Athletic Club. Following the 2009 World Team Trials, he was ranked second in the 96 kg/211.5 lbs weight class.

=== 2011 season ===
In June 2011, Andy announced his retirement from wrestling.

Andy then joined the Cliff Keen Wrestling Club as a coach.
