= Amédée Piguet =

Swiss wrestler (1904–1990)

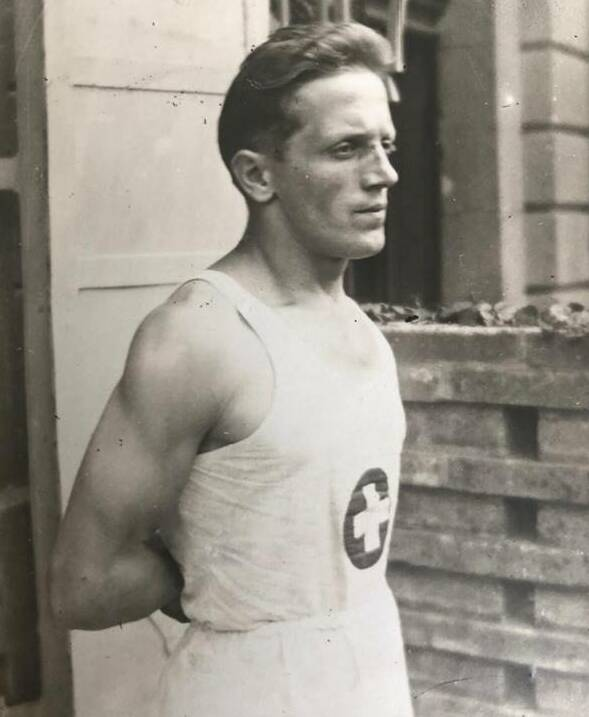
(Charles) Amédée Piguet

Charles Amédée Piguet (24 May 1904 – 31 December 1990) was a Swiss wrestler. He competed in the men's freestyle bantamweight at the 1928 Summer Olympics. He was born on 24 May 1904 in Langendorf and died on 31 December 1990 in Solothurn. A watchmaker by profession, he lived all his life in Lommiswil with his wife Lea Flury and had two children.
