= Michel Rozan =

French wrestler

Personal information
- Nationality: French

Sport
- Sport: Wrestling

Michel Rozan (16 June 1906 – 25 November 1974) was a French wrestler. He competed in the men's freestyle bantamweight at the 1928 Summer Olympics.
