= Ryan Bertin =

American wrestler (born 1981)

Personal information
- Born: November 13, 1981 (age 44) Broadview Heights, Ohio, U.S.

Sport
- Sport: Wrestling
- Event: Folkstyle
- College team: Michigan
Medal record
Men's collegiate wrestling
Representing the Michigan Wolverines
NCAA Division I Championships
Gold medal – first place	2003 Kansas City	157 lb
Gold medal – first place	2005 St. Louis	157 lb
Bronze medal – third place	2004 St. Louis	157 lb

Ryan Bertin (born November 13, 1981) is an American former folkstyle wrestler. He competed for the University of Michigan, and won NCAA Division I wrestling titles at 157 pounds in 2003 and 2005.

== Early life ==
He is the son of Laurie and Chris Bertin, who wrestled for the University of Cincinnati (1973–74). He attended St. Edward High School in Lakewood, Ohio, where he was a state and high school national champion. He finished with a career record of 140-18 and was coached by Greg Urbas. He also played soccer for two years (1997, 1998), earning varsity letters. Bertin graduated in 2000.

== Collegiate career ==
Bertin attended University of Michigan, with fellow St. Edward wrestling star Andy Hrovat. He was reshirted his freshman year. He competed at the 157 lbs. weight class and was a 4-time All-American. In 2002, he finished sixth. He was the NCAA National Champion in 2003. In 2004, he placed third. In 2005, he won his second NCAA National title. Upon winning his second NCAA championship, Bertin announced that he wrestled his last match. He never won a Big Ten championship title. However, he was the 2005 Big Ten Wrestler of the Year. He finished his collegiate career with a 142–21 record, which ranks fifth all-time for the Wolverines.

In the fall of 2006, Bertin became an assistant coach at Northwestern University, where his brother Kyle wrestled.
