= Roger Chandler =

American wrestler and coach

Personal information
- Home town: Sheffield Lake, Ohio, U.S.

Sport
- Sport: Wrestling
- Event: Folkstyle
- College team: Indiana Hoosiers
Medal record
Collegiate Wrestling
Representing the Indiana Hoosiers
NCAA Division I Championships
Silver medal – second place	1997 Cedar Falls	142 lb
Bronze medal – third place	1996 Minneapolis	142 lb

Roger Chandler is a former wrestler and current head coach of the Michigan State Spartans wrestling team.

== Wrestling career ==
=== High school career ===
Chandler was an OHSAA state champion in 1992 for St. Edward High School in Lakewood, Ohio, while wrestling for Greg Urbas. He was also runner-up at the NHSCA Senior Nationals.

=== College career ===
Chandler was a Big Ten Conference champion for the Indiana Hoosiers. He was also an NCAA runner-up and three-time All-American. He was inducted into the Indiana Hoosiers Athletics Hall of Fame in 2008.

== Coaching career ==
Chandler is currently the head wrestling coach at Michigan State. Prior to becoming head coach, he was an assistant at Michigan State.
