= Mark Jayne =

American wrestler

Mark Jayne is a former American wrestler. He established himself in wrestling at St. Edward High School in Lakewood, Ohio. Jayne was a three-time state champion in for St. Edward, while his team won the Division I state title all four years he was there. The team also won three national titles during his time there in 1998, 1999, and 2000. Many feel the 1998 and 2000 version of the St. Edward wrestling teams were the best ever in Ohio history. During Jayne's time in high school he became a three-time Ironman champion, the first-ever four-time Medina Invitational champion, and was an Iron-Beast his senior year winning both the Ironman and Beast of the East tournaments in his only year there. His senior year proved very dominant by falling his way through sectionals, districts, and state. By the time he completed his high school career, he held the record for most career victories at the prestigious St Edward High School. He followed this up by being named to the USA Dream Team as a senior in 2000 as well as the Cleveland Plain Dealer "Lee Kemp Wrestler of the Year." He also found success in Freestyle and Greco-Roman wrestling, earning seven All-American awards at the USA Nationals in Fargo, North Dakota. This includes a national title, a runner-up, and two thirds in the Junior division. His junior year he won the Ultimate Belt series for the high school division in Greco-Roman in both Ohio and the country.

Following high school, Jayne wrestled at the University of Illinois at Urbana-Champaign. During his time there he became a multiple All-American, Big Ten Champion, Las Vegas Invite champion, Midlands champion, and two-time NWCA All-Star Member. Jayne was also a two-time captain on the team during the team's regular season Big Ten championship as well as their historic Big Ten tournament championship in 2005, the team's first since 1952. He earned three Academic All-American awards and graduated from University of Illinois with Honors.

Jayne now spends his time as an educator, wrestling coach, and volunteer. As wrestling coach he is now head coach at Prairie Ridge after helping out at Batavia and Marmion Academy. He has also been the helping in the summers with wrestlers in freestyle and Greco-Roman, including coaching Team Illinois National Team in Fargo, ND. In the summer of 2006 Jayne headed to New Orleans to help with Habitat for Humanities following the devastating hurricanes Katrina and Rita.

Jayne served as head wrestling coach at Crystal Lake's Prairie Ridge High School for three years, 2010–2013. His state placers included Zach Synon, Eric English, and Travis Piotrowski. In 2012, Jayne started coaching at the newly established Team Poeta Training Center along with former Illini teammates Michael Poeta and Griff Powell. Currently Jayne is teaching health at Lakewood St. Edward and coaching the wrestling team. The wrestling team has won the state title in 2016, 2017 Dual, 2017, 2018 and 2019 during Jayne's career bringing their current total to 36.
