= Randy Vock =

Swiss freestyle wrestler

Personal information
- Full name: Randy Adrian Vock
- Born: 1 March 1994 (age 32)
- Height: 168 cm (5 ft 6 in)

Sport
- Country: Switzerland
- Sport: Amateur wrestling
- Weight class: 61 kg
- Event: Freestyle
Medal record
Men's freestyle wrestling
Representing Switzerland
European Championships
Bronze medal – third place	2019 Bucharest	61 kg

Randy Adrian Vock (born 1 March 1994) is a Swiss freestyle wrestler. He won one of the bronze medals in the 61 kg event at the 2019 European Wrestling Championships held in Bucharest, Romania.

In 2017, he competed at the 2017 European U23 Wrestling Championship where he lost his bronze medal match against Ali Rahimzade of Azerbaijan.

== Achievements ==
Year	Tournament	Location	Result	Event
2019	European Championships	Bucharest, Romania	3rd	Freestyle 61 kg
