= Domenic Abounader =

Lebanese-American wrestler

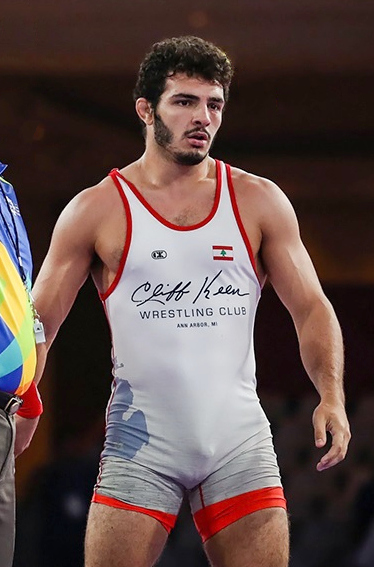
- Abounader at the 2018 Asian Games

Personal information
- Born: March 11, 1995 (age 31) Ohio, U.S.
- Home town: Gates Mills, Ohio, U.S.
- Height: 1.80 m (5 ft 11 in)
- Weight: 86 kg (190 lb)

Sport
- Country: Lebanon
- Sport: Wrestling
- Events: Freestyle and Folkstyle
- College team: Michigan
Medal record
Men's freestyle wrestling
Representing Lebanon
Asian Games
Silver medal – second place	2018 Jakarta	86 kg
Men's collegiate wrestling
Representing the Michigan Wolverines
Big Ten Championships
Gold medal – first place	2015 Columbus	184 lb
Bronze medal – third place	2014 Madison	184 lb
Bronze medal – third place	2016 Iowa City	184 lb
Bronze medal – third place	2018 East Lansing	184 lb

Domenic Michael Abounader (born March 11, 1995) is a Lebanese-American freestyle and folkstyle wrestler. Domestically, Abounader competed at St. Edward High School in Lakewood, Ohio, where he won three state titles, finishing his senior season undefeated and the number one ranked wrestler in the country at 182 lbs. Abounader attended The University of Michigan, where he was a Big Ten Champion and NCAA All-American.

Internationally, he competes for Lebanon, his father's home country. As a dual citizen, Domenic is eligible to compete for Lebanon, since he never wrestled for the United States at the international level. In his first international tournament, he won a silver medal at the 2018 Asian Games, the first medalist for Lebanon in wrestling. He lost to Iran's Hassan Yazdani in the final match of the men's freestyle 86 kg.

== Personal life ==
Abounader is the son of Sam and Michelle Abounader. He has three siblings.
