= Bert Sansum =

British wrestler (1893–1966)

- Born: 28 February 1893; Tottenham
- Died: 27 December 1966 (aged 73); London Borough of Merton

Herbert "Bert" Sansum (28 February 1893 – 27 December 1966) was a British wrestler. He competed at the 1924 and the 1928 Summer Olympics. Sansum was also a three-time British champion in bantamweight wrestling.
