= Recep Topal =

Turkish freestyle wrestler

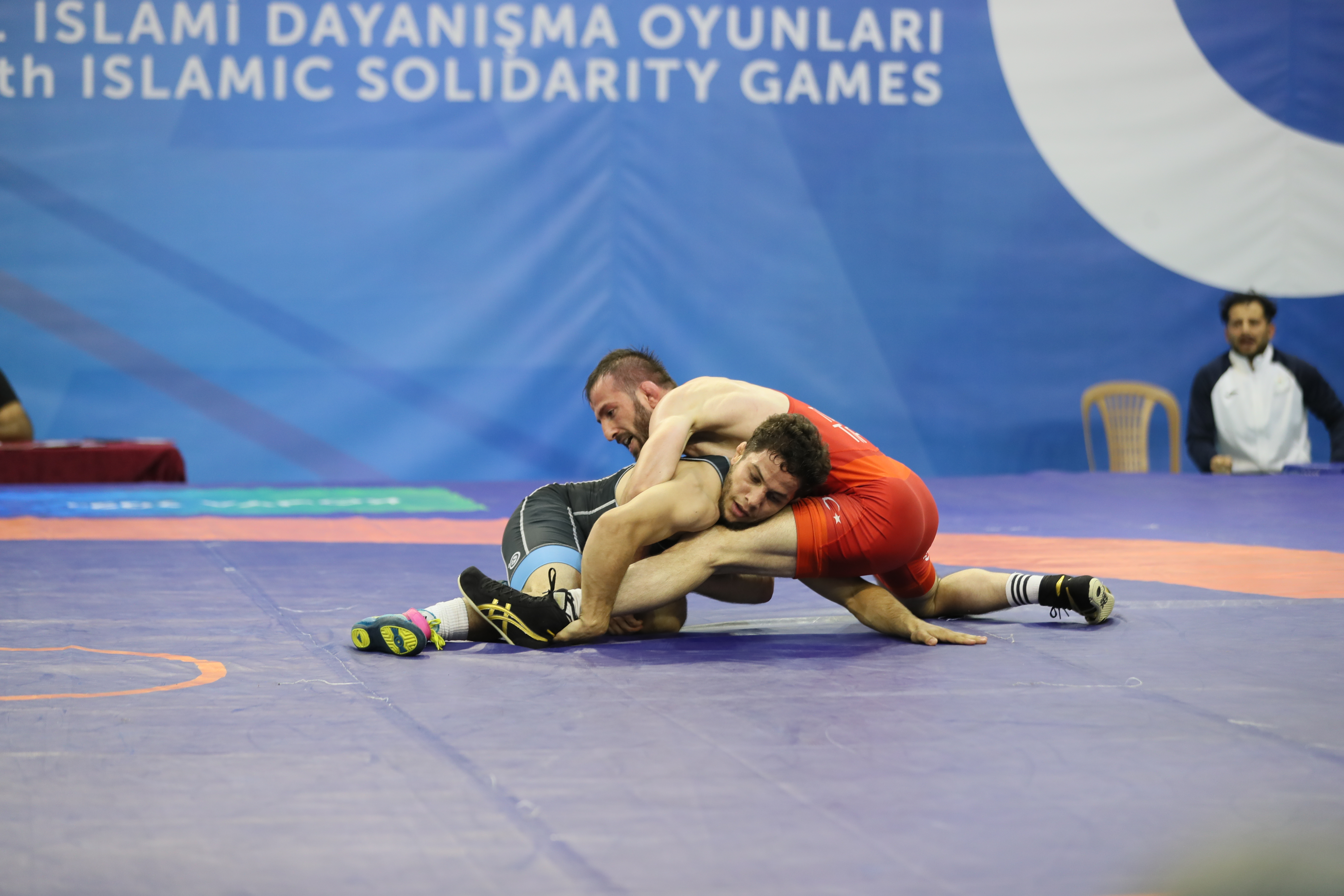

Personal information
- Nationality: Turkey
- Born: 29 January 1992 (age 34) Rize, Turkey
- Height: 1.69 m (5 ft 7 in)
- Weight: 61 kg (134 lb; 9.6 st)

Sport
- Country: Turkey
- Sport: Amateur wrestling
- Weight class: 61 kg
- Event: Freestyle
- Club: Ankara İlbank

Achievements and titles
- Regional finals: (bronze) (2018) (bronze) (2019)
Medal record
Men's freestyle wrestling
Representing Turkey
European Championships
Bronze medal – third place	2018 Kaspiysk	61 kg
Bronze medal – third place	2019 Bucharest	61 kg
Islamic Solidarity Games
Bronze medal – third place	2021 Konya	61 kg
Yasar Dogu Tournament
Gold medal – first place	2026 Antalya	61 kg
Bronze medal – third place	2016 Istanbul	61 kg
Bronze medal – third place	2020 Istanbul	61 kg
Bronze medal – third place	2025 Kocaeli	61 kg
Dan Kolov & Nikola Petrov Tournament
Gold medal – first place	2023 Sofia	61 kg
Bronze medal – third place	2018 Sofia	61 kg
Grand Prix
Gold medal – first place	2022 Rome	61 kg
Silver medal – second place	2020 Warsaw	61 kg
European U23 Championships
Bronze medal – third place	2015 Wlabrzych	61 kg
European Cadets Championships
Silver medal – second place	2009 Zrenjanin	50 kg

Recep Topal (born 29 january 1992) is a Turkish freestyle wrestler. He won one of the bronze medals in the 61 kg event at the 2019 European Wrestling Championships held in Bucharest, Romania. In 2018, he also won one of the bronze medals in this event.

== Career ==
In 2020, he competed in the men's 62 kg event at the Individual Wrestling World Cup held in Belgrade, Serbia.

In 2022, he lost his bronze medal match in his event at the Yasar Dogu Tournament held in Istanbul, Turkey. A few months later, he won the gold medal in his event at the Matteo Pellicone Ranking Series 2022 held in Rome, Italy. He won one of the bronze medals in the men's 61 kg event at the 2021 Islamic Solidarity Games held in Konya, Turkey.

== Achievements ==
Year	Tournament	Location	Result	Event
2018	European Championships	Kaspiysk, Russia	3rd	Freestyle 61 kg
2019	European Championships	Bucharest, Romania	3rd	Freestyle 61 kg
2022	Islamic Solidarity Games	Konya, Turkey	3rd	Freestyle 61 kg
