= Michigan Wolverines wrestling =

Sports team

- University: University of Michigan
- Head coach: Sean Bormet (6th season)
- Conference: Big Ten
- Location: Ann Arbor, MI
- Arena: Cliff Keen Arena (capacity: 1,800)
- Nickname: Wolverines
- Fight song: The Victors

NCAA individual champions
- 24

All-Americans
- 208

Conference Tournament championships
- Big Ten: 1929, 1938, 1944, 1953, 1955, 1956, 1960, 1963, 1964, 1965, 1973, 2022

The Michigan Wolverines wrestling team is an NCAA Division I Wrestling team competing as members of the Big Ten Conference. The team is coached by Sean Bormet, a two-time All-American at Michigan.

== Current coaching staff ==
As of December 27, 2022.

Name	Position coached	Consecutive season at Michigan in current position
Sean Bormet	Head coach	5th
Josh Churella	Assistant Coach	9th
Kevin Jackson	Assistant Coach	2nd
*David Bolyard	Volunteer Coach	5th

== Head coach history ==
Years	Name
1921–1922	Clifford Thorne
1922–1923	Peter Botchen
1923–1925	Dick Barker
1925–1970	Cliff Keen
1942–1944	Ray Courtright (Interim)
1944–1945	Wally Weber (Interim)
1970–1974	Rick Bay
1974–1978	Bill Johannesen
1979–1999	Dale Bahr
1999–2018	Joe McFarland
2018–present	Sean Bormet

== National champions ==
Year	NCAA Champion	Weight Class
1930	Otto Kelly	155 lbs
1932	Carl Dougovito	175 lbs
1939	Harold Nichols	145 lbs
1940	Donald Nichols	175 lbs
1946	William Courtright	155 lbs
1953	Norvard Nalen	130 lbs
1954	Norvard Nalen (2)	130 lbs
1963	Jack Barden	191 lbs
1966	David Porter	Heavyweight
1967	Jim Kamman	152 lbs
1968	David Porter (2)	Heavyweight
1973	Jarrett Hubbard	150 lbs
1974	Jarrett Hubbard (2)	150 lbs
1977	Mark Churella	150 lbs
1978	Mark Churella (2)	150 lbs
1979	Mark Churella (3)	167 lbs
1986	Kirk Trost	Heavyweight
2003	Ryan Bertin	157 lbs
2005	Ryan Bertin (2)	157 lbs
2009	Steve Luke	174 lbs
2011	Kellen Russell	141 lbs
2012	Kellen Russell (2)	141 lbs
2022	Nick Suriano	125 lbs
2023	Mason Parris	Heavyweight

== Awards and honors ==
=== Wrestlers ===
Dan Hodge Trophy

- Mason Parris (2023)

=== Coaches ===
NWCA Coach of the Year

- Sean Bormet (2022)

Big Ten Coach of the Year

- Sean Bormet (2022)

== Olympians ==
Michigan wrestlers in the Olympics
Year	Name	Country	Style	Weight Class	Place
1928 Amsterdam	Ed Don George	United States	Freestyle	+87 kg	4th
1928 Amsterdam	Robert Hewitt	United States	Freestyle	56 kg	5th
1980 Moscow	Mark Johnson	United States	Greco-Roman	90 kg	Boycott
1984 Los Angeles	Steve Fraser	United States	Greco-Roman	90 kg	Gold
2008 Beijing	Andy Hrovat	United States	Freestyle	84 kg	12th
2020 Tokyo	Myles Amine	San Marino	Freestyle	86 kg	Bronze
2020 Tokyo	Stevan Mićić	Serbia	Freestyle	57 kg	14th
2024 Paris	Myles Amine	San Marino	Freestyle	86 kg	5th
2024 Paris	Austin Gomez	Mexico	Freestyle	86 kg	12th
2024 Paris	Stevan Mićić	Serbia	Freestyle	57 kg	DNC
2024 Paris	Mason Parris	United States	Freestyle	125 kg	10th
2024 Paris	Adam Coon	United States	Greco-Roman	130 kg	12th

== Notable Michigan wrestlers ==
- Domenic Abounader – Asian Games silver medalist in freestyle wrestling, NCAA All-American and Big Ten Champion
- Myles Amine – Olympic bronze medalist in freestyle wrestling at 2020 Summer Olympics representing San Marino, five-time NCAA All-American and two-time Big Ten Champion
- Rick Bay – two-time Big Ten Champion, served as head wrestling coach for Michigan (1970–74), and was later a college athletic director and professional sports executive
- Ryan Bertin – two-time NCAA Champion and four-time All-American
- Mark Churella – three-time NCAA Champion
- Dennis Fitzgerald – two-time Big Ten Champion, gold medalist for USA at 1963 Pan American Games, was also a Michigan football player along with being a college and NFL coach
- Steve Fraser – Olympic gold medalist in Greco-Roman wrestling at 1984 Summer Olympics, first American gold medalist in Greco-Roman wrestling, two-time NCAA All-American
- Ed Don George – Olympian in freestyle wrestling at 1928 Summer Olympics, later was a professional wrestler
- John Greene – Big Ten runner-up as a wrestler, also played football at Michigan, going on to play seven seasons in the NFL as a wide receiver for the Detroit Lions
- Robert Hewitt – Olympian in freestyle wrestling at 1928 Summer Olympics, two-time NCAA finalist
- Andy Hrovat – Olympian in freestyle wrestling at 2008 Summer Olympics, three-time NCAA All-American
- Mark Johnson – qualified for the 1980 U.S. Olympic Team in Greco-Roman wrestling, two-time NCAA finalist
- Harold Nichols – NCAA Champion, won six NCAA team championships as head coach at Iowa State
- Stevan Mićić – Olympian at 2020 Summer Olympics in freestyle wrestling representing Serbia, World Champion at the 2023 World Championships, NCAA finalist, three-time All-American and Big Ten Champion
- Alec Pantaleo – 2022 U.S. Open National Champion in freestyle wrestling, three-time NCAA All-American and Big Ten Champion
- Mason Parris – 2023 NCAA Champion at Heavyweight and three-time All-American, 2023 Dan Hodge Award winner, Big Ten Champion, and Junior World Champion in freestyle
- Dave Porter – two-time NCAA Champion and three-time All-American, also played football at Michigan lettering twice as a defensive tackle
- Nick Suriano – NCAA Champion and Big Ten Champion at Michigan. Also won 133 lb title at Rutgers University and became their first ever NCAA Champion in school history.
- Joe Warren – 2006 World Champion in Greco-Roman wrestling, NCAA All-American
