= Ohio State Buckeyes wrestling =

NCAA Division I college wrestling team

- Founded: 1920
- University: Ohio State University
- Head coach: Tom Ryan
- Assistant coach: J. Jaggers
- Conference: Big Ten
- Location: Columbus, OH
- Arena: Covelli Center (capacity: 3,700)
- Nickname: Buckeyes
- Colors: Scarlet and gray
- Fight song: Buckeye Battle Cry

Team national championships
- 1

National championship years
- 2015

NCAA individual champions
- 25

All-Americans
- 117

Conference championships
- 57

Conference Tournament championships
- Big Ten: 1923, 1951, 2015, 2017, 2018

The Ohio State Buckeyes wrestling team represents the Ohio State University and competes in the Big Ten Conference of the NCAA Division I level. The Buckeyes host their home meets at the Covelli Center on Ohio State's campus.

The team is coached by two-time NCAA Division I All-American and two-time Big Ten Conference champion for the Iowa Hawkeyes Tom Ryan. In 2015, he led the team to their first NCAA team title, finishing as runner-ups in 2008, 2009, 2017, 2018 and 2019. Currently, the Buckeyes have had five consecutive top-three NCAA team finishes (seven overall) and eleven top-eight team finishes in the last twelve NCAA championships.

== Championships ==
=== Team championships ===
Year	Type	Coach
National Team Championships
2015	NCAA Division I Tournament Champions	Tom Ryan
1 Total
Conference Team Championships
1923	Big Ten Tournament Champions	Al Haft
1951	Big Ten Tournament Champions	Casey Fredericks
2015	Big Ten Tournament Champions	Tom Ryan
2017	Big Ten Tournament Champions	Tom Ryan
2018	Big Ten Tournament Champions	Tom Ryan
5 Total

=== Individual championships ===
Individual NCAA Champions
Year	Name	Weight Class
1940	George Downes	HWT
1946	George Bollas	HWT
1966	Dave Reinbolt	167
1986	Jude Skove	158
1988	Mark Coleman	190
1992	Kevin Randleman	177
1993	Kevin Randleman	177
1993	Rex Holman	190
1998	Mitch Clark	177
2002	Tommy Rowlands	HWT
2004	Tommy Rowlands	HWT
2008	J Jaggers	141
2008	Mike Pucillo	184
2009	J Jaggers	141
2012	Logan Stieber	133
2013	Logan Stieber	133
2014	Logan Stieber	141
2015	Logan Stieber	141
2015	Nathan Tomasello	125
2016	Myles Martin	174
2016	Kyle Snyder	HWT
2017	Kyle Snyder	HWT
2018	Kyle Snyder	HWT
2024	Jesse Mendez	141
2025	Jesse Mendez	141

Big Ten Champions
Year	Name	Weight Class
1921	Parry Martter	158
1922	Parry Martter	145
1924	Harry Steel	HWT
1926	Perry Snider	125
1926	Dan Whitacre	HWT
1927	Dan Whitacre	HWT
1935	Leonard Fauver	118
1940	Tony Montonaro	145
1945	George Bollas	HWT
1946	George Bollas	HWT
1948	Warren Jones	145
1949	Bryce Keough	155
1950	William Miller	HWT
1951	Bryce Keough	147
1951	William Miller	HWT
1960	Dave Camaione	123
1966	Dave Reinbolt	167
1968	Roger Young	130
1972	Jim Humphrey	134
1982	Dave Ruckman	167
1985	Don Moxley	HWT
1988	Mark Coleman	190
1991	Kevin Randleman	167
1992	Kevin Randleman	177
1992	Rex Holman	190
1993	Kevin Randleman	177
1993	Rex Holman	190
1994	Dunyasha Yetts	142
1997	Mitch Clark	177
1998	Mitch Clark	177

Big Ten Champions
Year	Name	Weight Class
2002	Tommy Rowlands	HWT
2004	Tommy Rowlands	HWT
2008	Mike Pucillo	184
2010	Lance Palmer	149
2012	Logan Stieber	133
2013	Hunter Stieber	141
2013	Logan Stieber	133
2014	Nick Heflin	197
2014	Logan Stieber	141
2015	Logan Stieber	141
2015	Nathan Tomasello	125
2016	Nathan Tomasello	125
2016	Kyle Snyder	HWT
2017	Bo Jordan	174
2017	Kollin Moore	197
2017	Kyle Snyder	HWT
2017	Nathan Tomasello	133
2018	Joey McKenna	141
2018	Nathan Tomasello	133
2018	Kollin Moore	197
2018	Kyle Snyder	HWT
2018	Nathan Tomasello	133
2019	Myles Martin	184
2019	Joey McKenna	141
2020	Luke Pletcher	141
2020	Kollin Moore	197
2021	Sammy Sasso	149
2023	Sammy Sasso	149
2024	Jesse Mendez	141

== Season records ==
National champions †	Conference champions *

Season	Coach	Overall	Big Ten	Standing	NCAA
Al Haft (Big Ten Conference) (1920–25)
1920–21	Al Haft	2–1	0–1	4th	
1921–22	Al Haft	3–3	0–3		
1922–23*	Al Haft	8–0	4–0	1st*	
1923–24	Al Haft	3–3	2–3		
1924–25	Al Haft	6–1	3–1		
Al Haft:		22–8	9–8		
Bernard Mooney (Big Ten Conference) (1925–42)
1925–26	Bernard Mooney	6–1	5–1	2nd	
1926–27	Bernard Mooney	4–2	3–2		
1927–28	Bernard Mooney	6–1	5–1	3rd	
1928–29	Bernard Mooney	3–5	1–4		8th
1929–30	Bernard Mooney	6–2	3–2		8th
1930–31	Bernard Mooney	3–2–1	2–2		
1931–32	Bernard Mooney	3–5	0–3		
1932–33	Bernard Mooney	2–3	1–2		
1933–34	Bernard Mooney	5–2	3–2	7th	
1934–35	Bernard Mooney	5–2	3–2	3rd	14th
1935–36	Bernard Mooney	4–2	3–2	6th	
1936–37	Bernard Mooney	5–3	2–3	6th	
1937–38	Bernard Mooney	7–2	3–2	7th	
1938–39	Bernard Mooney	3–4	1–3	6th	
1939–40	Bernard Mooney	3–3	1–1–3	3rd	4th
1940–41	Bernard Mooney	3–5	1–4	9th	17th
1941–42	Bernard Mooney	3–5	1–4	9th	
Bernard Mooney:		71–49–1	38–40–3		
Anthony Montonaro (Big Ten Conference) (1942–43)
1942–43	Anthony Montonaro	1–6	0–4	10th	
Anthony Montonaro:		1–6	0–4		
Lawrence Hicks (Big Ten Conference) (1943–44)
1943–44	Lawrence Hicks	5–2	4–1	9th	
Lawrence Hicks:		5–2	4–1		
Bernard Mooney (Big Ten Conference) (1944–47)
1944–45	Bernard Mooney	1–5	0–4	4th	
1945–46	Bernard Mooney	2–3	2–3	4th	6th
1946–47	Bernard Mooney	4–3	3–3–1	8th	
Bernard Mooney:		7–11	5–10–1		
Overall:		78–60–1	43–50–4		
Casey Fredericks (Big Ten Conference) (1947–76)
1947–48	Casey Fredericks	3–3–2	2–3–2	6th	
1948–49	Casey Fredericks	3–5	2–5	4th	
1949–50	Casey Fredericks	7–1–1	5–1–1	2nd	
1950–51*	Casey Fredericks	7–0–1	6–0–1	1st*	
1951–52	Casey Fredericks	4–4	4–3	10th	
1952–53	Casey Fredericks	0–6	0–5	8th	
1953–54	Casey Fredericks	2–6	0–6	10th	
1954–55	Casey Fredericks	3–6	2–5	7th	
1955–56	Casey Fredericks	3–5	2–5	7th	
1956–57	Casey Fredericks	1–5	0–4	10th	
1957–58	Casey Fredericks	3–2–1	1–2–1	8th	
1958–59	Casey Fredericks	0–6	0–5	9th	33rd
1959–60	Casey Fredericks	2–2–2	1–2–2	8th	37th
1960–61	Casey Fredericks	3–4	2–4	10th	28th
1961–62	Casey Fredericks	7–1–1	3–1–1	10th	
1962–63	Casey Fredericks	5–8	2–7	7th	27th
1963–64	Casey Fredericks	7–2	2–2	9th	
1964–65	Casey Fredericks	5–8–1	2–7–1	8th	35th
1965–66	Casey Fredericks	8–2–1	5–2–1	5th	11th
1966–67	Casey Fredericks	4–6	3–6	4th	28th
1967–68	Casey Fredericks	5–6	2–5	7th	52nd
1968–69	Casey Fredericks	6–7	3–4	9th	42nd
1969–70	Casey Fredericks	7–4–1	4–3–1	5th	
1970–71	Casey Fredericks	9–3–1	4–3–1	10th	
1971–72	Casey Fredericks	3–6	1–3	7th	24th
1972–73	Casey Fredericks	8–4	2–3	6th	32nd
1973–74	Casey Fredericks	3–11	1–7	10th	
1974–75	Casey Fredericks	7–5	3–2	8th	45th
1975–76	Casey Fredericks	11–5–1	2–4	8th	
Casey Fredericks:		136–133–13	66–109–12		
Chris Ford (Big Ten Conference) (1976–86)
1976–77	Chris Ford	5–7–1	2–4–1	8th	20th
1977–78	Chris Ford	7–11	3–4	9th	61st
1978–79	Chris Ford	9–10	4–5	8th	55th
1979–80	Chris Ford	9–11	3–4	5th	33rd
1980–81	Chris Ford	14–3	7–2	5th	47th
1981–82	Chris Ford	13–8–1	3–6	6th	29th
1982–83	Chris Ford	17–7	5–4	5th	13th
1983–84	Chris Ford	13–12–1	4–5	6th	44th
1984–85	Chris Ford	14–13	2–7	7th	46th
1985–86	Chris Ford	13–9	4–6	7th	16th
Chris Ford:		114–91–3	37–47–1		
'Russ Hellickson (Big Ten Conference) (1986–2006)
1986–87	Russ Hellickson	13–9	3–6	8th	62nd
1987–88	Russ Hellickson	16–6	6–3	3rd	9th
1988–89	Russ Hellickson	18–10–2	5–7	4th	43rd
1989–90	Russ Hellickson	20–5	5–3	5th	14th
1990–91	Russ Hellickson	17–4	6–2	3rd	4th
1991–92	Russ Hellickson	20–4	7–0	3rd	5th
1992–93	Russ Hellickson	17–6	6–2	3rd	5th
1993–94	Russ Hellickson	15–11–1	2–5–1	8th	24th
1994–95	Russ Hellickson	16–10	2–6	8th	24th
1995–96	Russ Hellickson	13–9–1	2–6–1	5th	14th
1996–97	Russ Hellickson	10–12	4–5	6th	13th
1997–98	Russ Hellickson	10–13–1	1–8	10th	23rd
1998–99	Russ Hellickson	10–10–1	1–6–1	11th	40th
1999–00	Russ Hellickson	9–9	2–6	7th	34th
2000–01	Russ Hellickson	15–6	5–3	5th	16th
2001–02	Russ Hellickson	20–4	5–3	4th	6th
2002–03	Russ Hellickson	12–6–1	4–4	8th	15th
2003–04	Russ Hellickson	8–11	4–4	8th	3rd
2004–05	Russ Hellickson	8–11	1–7	11th	50th
2005–06	Russ Hellickson	5–13	0–8	11th	45th
Russ Hellickson:		272–169–7	71–94–3		
Tom Ryan (Big Ten Conference) (2006–present)
2006–07	Tom Ryan	8–7	4–4	9th	10th
2007–08	Tom Ryan	19–4	6–2	5th	2nd
2008–09	Tom Ryan	16–2	7–1	6th	2nd
2009–10	Tom Ryan	18-2	7-1	4th	8th
2010–11	Tom Ryan	2–11	1–7	8th	29th
2011–12	Tom Ryan	13–4	5–3	5th	5th
2012–13	Tom Ryan	11–4	5–3	4th	6th
2013–14	Tom Ryan	13–5	4–4	4th	6th
2014–15*†	Tom Ryan	13–4	8–1	1st*	1st†
2015–16	Tom Ryan	11–3	7–2	3rd	3rd
2016–17*	Tom Ryan	11–3	7–2	1st*	2nd
2017–18*	Tom Ryan	14–1	8–1	1st*	2nd
2018–19	Tom Ryan	12–2	7–2	2nd	2nd
2019–20	Tom Ryan	10–4	6–3	3rd	Canceled
2020-21	Tom Ryan	5-4	5-4	9th	9th
2021-22	Tom Ryan	9-3	5-3	4th	13th
2022-23	Tom Ryan	13-3	6-2	4th	4th
2023-24	Tom Ryan	15-2	7-1	5th	8th
Tom Ryan:		213-68	98–53		
Total:		827–548–24	328–364–20		

== Olympians ==
Ohio State wrestlers in the Olympics
Year	Name	Country	Style	Weight Class	Place
1924 Paris	Perry Martter	United States	Freestyle	67.5 kg	9th
1924 Paris	Harry Steel	United States	Freestyle	+87 kg	Gold
1972 Munich	Wayne Holmes	United States	Greco-Roman	48 kg	DNP
1992 Barcelona	Mark Coleman	United States	Freestyle	100 kg	7th
2016 Rio de Janeiro	Kyle Snyder	United States	Freestyle	97 kg	Gold
2020 Tokyo	Kyle Snyder	United States	Freestyle	97 kg	Silver
2024 Paris	Kyle Snyder	United States	Freestyle	97 kg	5th

== Notable Ohio State wrestlers ==
- Mark Coleman – member of the UFC Hall of Fame, world silver medalist in freestyle wrestling, NCAA champion
- Wayne Holmes – Olympian in Greco-Roman wrestling at 1972 Summer Olympics
- Myles Martin – NCAA champion, two-time finalist, and four-time All-American
- Perry Martter – Olympian in freestyle wrestling at 1924 Summer Olympics
- Joseph McKenna – NCAA finalist and two-time All-American
- Kollin Moore – four-time NCAA All-American
- Lance Palmer – four-time NCAA All-American
- Tommy Rowlands – two-time NCAA champion, three-time finalist, and four-time All-American
- Sammy Sasso – two-time NCAA finalist and four-time All-American
- Kyle Snyder – Olympic gold medalist in freestyle wrestling at 2016 Summer Olympics and silver medalist in 2020, two-time world champion, three-time NCAA champion, and four-time NCAA finalist
- Harry Steel – Olympic gold medalist in freestyle wrestling at 1924 Summer Olympics
- Logan Stieber – 2016 World Champion in freestyle wrestling, four-time NCAA champion
- Nathan Tomasello – NCAA champion and four-time All-American
