= Big Ten Wrestling Championships =

- Sport: Wrestling
- Conference: Big Ten Conference
- Number of teams: 14
- Current stadium: Bryce Jordan Center
- Current location: University Park, Pennsylvania
- Last contest: 2026
- Current champion: Penn State (10th title)
- Most championships: Iowa (37 titles)
- TV partner: Big Ten Network

The Big Ten Wrestling Championships are collegiate wrestling competitions held annually by the Big Ten Conference after the regular season. In addition to determining the Big Ten champion in each weight class, it determines the wrestlers that compete in the NCAA Division I Wrestling Championships.

The Iowa Hawkeyes have won more Big Ten team championships than any other school with 37 titles, their most recent coming in 2021. Under head coach Pat Wright, Iowa won its first title in 1915 at the Western Intercollegiate Wrestling, Gymnastics, and Fencing Association Invitational, an open meet that determined Big Ten champions from 1913 until 1921. Under head coaches Gary Kurdelmeier and Dan Gable, Iowa set the record for the longest streak of consecutive titles with 25, winning from 1974 through 1998. During that time, Gable set the record for most titles by a coach with 21.

The Iowa Hawkeyes also have the most NCAA team championships by a Big Ten school with 24 titles. Under Gable, Iowa set a record by winning nine straight NCAA titles from 1978 through 1986. Gable also set the record for the most NCAA titles won by a head coach with 15.

The Big Ten Conference has won a record 41 NCAA team championships, including 17 straight titles since 2007.

== Championships ==
Big Ten results

=== Champions by year ===
Year	Host city	Host arena	Team championship				Most Outstanding Wrestler
Year	Host city	Host arena	Champions	Pts.	Runner-ups	Pts.	Most Outstanding Wrestler
1913	Madison, Wisconsin (Wisconsin)		Illinois^{(1)} Minnesota^{(1)}	11.0	Indiana; Iowa	6.0	
1914	Chicago, Illinois (Chicago)	Bartlett Gymnasium	Indiana^{(1)}	15.67	Wisconsin	10.33	
1915	Lincoln, Nebraska (Nebraska)	Nebraska Gymnasium	Indiana^{(2)} Iowa^{(1)}	14.0			
1916	Minneapolis, Minnesota (Minnesota)	University of Minnesota Armory	Iowa^{(2)}	14.5	Indiana	14.0	
1917	Iowa City, Iowa (Iowa)		Illinois^{(2)}	21.0	Indiana	14.0	
1918	No meet held						
1919	No meet held						
1920	Urbana, Illinois (Illinois)	Men's Gymnasium	Illinois^{(3)}	24.0	Nebraska	16.0	
1921	Bloomington, Indiana (Indiana)		Indiana^{(3)}	16.0	Iowa	15.0	
1922	Madison, Wisconsin (Wisconsin)		Illinois^{(4)}				
1923	Chicago, Illinois (Chicago)		Ohio State^{(1)}				
1924	Evanston, Illinois (Northwestern)		Illinois^{(5)} Indiana^{(4)}				
1925	Champaign, Illinois (Illinois)		Illinois^{(6)} Indiana^{(5)}				
1926	West Lafayette, Indiana (Purdue)	Memorial Gymnasium	Illinois^{(7)}		Ohio State		
1927	Chicago, Illinois (Chicago)		Illinois^{(8)}		Michigan		
1928	Bloomington, Indiana (Indiana)		Illinois^{(9)}		Michigan		
1929	West Lafayette, Indiana (Purdue)	Memorial Gymnasium	Michigan^{(1)}		Illinois		
1930	Champaign, Illinois (Illinois)	New Gymnasium	Illinois^{(10)}				
1931	Chicago, Illinois (Chicago)		Indiana^{(6)}				
1932	Bloomington, Indiana (Indiana)		Illinois^{(11)} Indiana^{(7)}				
1933	Champaign, Illinois (Illinois)	New Gymnasium	Indiana^{(8)}				
1934	Bloomington, Indiana (Indiana)		Indiana^{(9)}	34	Illinois	19	
1935	Chicago, Illinois (Chicago)		Illinois^{(12)}	37	Iowa	20	
1936	Iowa City, Iowa (Iowa)		Indiana^{(10)}	23	Iowa	22	
1937	Ann Arbor, Michigan (Michigan)		Illinois^{(13)}	24	Michigan	19	John Whitaker (Minnesota)
1938	Evanston, Illinois (Northwestern)		Michigan^{(2)}	28	Indiana	25	—
1939	Chicago, Illinois		Indiana^{(11)}	27	Illinois; Michigan	19	—
1940	West Lafayette, Indiana (Purdue)		Indiana^{(12)}	24.0	Michigan	23.0	—
1941	Columbus, Ohio		Minnesota^{(2)}	13.0	Iowa; Indiana	12.0	Ben Wilson (Indiana)
1942	Chicago, Illinois		Purdue^{(1)}	33.0	Illinois; Michigan	18.0	—
1943	Evanston, Illinois (Northwestern)		Indiana^{(13)}	27.0	Michigan	22.0	—
1944	Evanston, Illinois (Northwestern)		Michigan^{(3)}	19.0	Illinois	10.0	—
1945	Evanston, Illinois (Northwestern)		Purdue^{(2)}	18.0	Iowa	17.0	—
1946	Champaign, Illinois (Illinois)		Illinois^{(14)}	31.0	Indiana	25.0	—
1947	Evanston, Illinois (Northwestern)		Illinois^{(15)}	36.0	Purdue	22.0	—
1948	Champaign, Illinois (Illinois)		Purdue^{(3)}	24.0	Illinois; Iowa; Michigan	23.0	—
1949	Bloomington, Indiana (Indiana)		Purdue^{(4)}	19.0	Minnesota	18.0	Arnold Plaza (Purdue)
1950	Iowa City, Iowa (Iowa)		Purdue^{(5)}	33.0	Ohio State	16.0	Joe Patacsil (Purdue)
1951	Evanston, Illinois (Northwestern)		Ohio State^{(2)}	26.0	Michigan	20.0	Bill Miller (Ohio State)
1952	Ann Arbor, Michigan (Michigan)		Illinois^{(16)}	26.0	Michigan	20.0	Don Ryan (Wisconsin)
1953	Bloomington, Indiana (Indiana)		Michigan^{(4)}	27.0	Michigan State	22.0	Norvard Nalan (Michigan)
1954	East Lansing, Michigan (Michigan State)	Jenison Fieldhouse	Purdue^{(6)}	26.0	Michigan	22.0	—
1955	Minneapolis, Minnesota (Minnesota)	Williams Arena	Michigan^{(5)}	50.0	Iowa	46.0	—
1956	Evanston, Illinois (Northwestern)	McGaw Memorial Hall	Michigan^{(6)}	63.0	Iowa	59.0	—
1957	Columbus, Ohio (Ohio State)		Minnesota^{(3)}	55.0	Michigan	54.0	Mike Rodriguez (Michigan)
1958	Champaign, Illinois (Illinois)		Iowa^{(3)}	51.0	Illinois	48.0	Max Pearson (Michigan)
1959	Iowa City, Iowa (Iowa)		Minnesota^{(4)}	50.0	Iowa	46.0	Bill Wright (Minnesota)
1960	Ann Arbor, Michigan (Michigan)		Michigan^{(7)}	65.0	Iowa	50.0	David Camaione (Ohio State)
1961	East Lansing, Michigan (Michigan State)	Jenison Fieldhouse	Michigan State^{(1)}	69.0	Michigan	65.0	Bob Marshall (Purdue)
1962	Minneapolis, Minnesota (Minnesota)		Iowa^{(4)}	51.0	Michigan	46.0	Bob Marshall (Purdue)
1963	Evanston, Illinois (Northwestern)	McGaw Memorial Hall	Michigan^{(8)}	52.0	Iowa	42.0	—
1964	Madison, Wisconsin (Wisconsin)		Michigan^{(9)}	56.0	Iowa	41.0	Norm Parker (Iowa)
1965	Ann Arbor, Michigan (Michigan)		Michigan^{(10)}	88.0	Michigan State	38.0	Rick Bay (Michigan)
1966	Champaign, Illinois (Illinois)		Michigan State^{(2)}	71.0	Michigan	67.0	Bob Fehrs (Michigan)
1967	Columbus, Ohio (Ohio State)		Michigan State^{(3)}	92.0	Michigan	78.0	Dave Porter (Michigan)
1968	Iowa City, Iowa (Iowa)		Michigan State^{(4)}	74.0	Iowa; Michigan; Northwestern	50.0	Roger Young (Ohio State)
1969	East Lansing, Michigan (Michigan State)	Jenison Fieldhouse	Michigan State^{(5)}	92.0	Iowa	50.0	Jeff Smith (Michigan State)
1970	Ann Arbor, Michigan (Michigan)		Michigan State^{(6)}	96.0	Iowa	65.0	Jack Zindel (Michigan State)
1971	West Lafayette, Indiana (Purdue)	Lambert Fieldhouse	Michigan State^{(7)}	101.0	Iowa	67.0	Steve DeVries (Iowa)
1972	Bloomington, Indiana (Indiana)		Michigan State^{(8)}	95.5	Iowa	62.0	—
1973	Minneapolis, Minnesota (Minnesota)		Michigan^{(11)}	76.0	Iowa	69.0	Tom Milkovich (Michigan State)
1974	Evanston, Illinois (Northwestern)	McGaw Memorial Hall	Iowa^{(5)}	151.0	Michigan	123.0	Chris Campbell (Iowa)
1975	Columbus, Ohio (Ohio State)		Iowa^{(6)}	118.5	Wisconsin	85.5	Joe Corso (Purdue)
1976	Iowa City, Iowa (Iowa)		Iowa^{(7)}	97.25	Minnesota	57.5	Larry Zilverberg (Minnesota)
1977	Madison, Wisconsin (Wisconsin)		Iowa^{(8)}	107.75	Minnesota	65.5	Mike McArthur (Minnesota)
1978	Ann Arbor, Michigan (Michigan)		Iowa^{(9)}	117.25	Wisconsin	94.0	Lee Kemp (Wisconsin)
1979	Iowa City, Iowa (Iowa)		Iowa^{(10)}	106.25	Wisconsin	90.5	Mike DeAnna (Iowa)
1980	East Lansing, Michigan (Michigan State)	Jenison Fieldhouse	Iowa^{(11)}	99.75	Wisconsin	80.75	Ed Banach (Iowa); Dan Zilverberg (Minnesota)
1981	Madison, Wisconsin (Wisconsin)		Iowa^{(12)}	126.75	Minnesota	57.5	Ed Banach (Iowa)
1982	Ann Arbor, Michigan (Michigan)	Crisler Arena	Iowa^{(13)}	130.25	Minnesota	49.75	—
1983	Iowa City, Iowa (Iowa)		Iowa^{(14)}	200.0	Michigan State	81.5	Ed Banach (Iowa)
1984	East Lansing, Michigan (Michigan State)	Jenison Fieldhouse	Iowa^{(15)}	175.75	Michigan State	103.25	Jim Zalesky (Iowa)
1985	Evanston, Illinois (Northwestern)	Welsh–Ryan Arena	Iowa^{(16)}	195.5	Wisconsin	105.5	Barry Davis (Iowa)
1986	Minneapolis, Minnesota (Minnesota)	Williams Arena	Iowa^{(17)}	169.75	Wisconsin	95.0	Ed Giese (Minnesota); Brad Penrith (Iowa)
1987	Madison, Wisconsin (Wisconsin)		Iowa^{(18)}	153.0	Wisconsin	121.5	Royce Alger (Iowa)
1988	Ann Arbor, Michigan (Michigan)	Crisler Arena	Iowa^{(19)}	116.75	Michigan	105.25	Royce Alger (Iowa)
1989	West Lafayette, Indiana (Purdue)	Mackey Arena	Iowa^{(20)}	125.25	Minnesota	113.75	Tom Brands (Iowa)
1990	Evanston, Illinois (Northwestern)	Welsh–Ryan Arena	Iowa^{(21)}	138	Indiana	108.75	Dave Zuniga (Minnesota)
1991	Champaign, Illinois (Illinois)	Assembly Hall	Iowa^{(22)}	164	Michigan	92.5	Jon Llewellyn (Illinois); Matt Demaray (Wisconsin)
1992	Madison, Wisconsin (Wisconsin)	Wisconsin Field House	Iowa^{(23)}	185	Wisconsin	104	Terry Brands (Iowa)
1993	Columbus, Ohio (Ohio State)	St. John Arena	Iowa^{(24)}	128	Penn State	123.5	Troy Sunderland (Penn State)
1994	Iowa City, Iowa (Iowa)	Carver–Hawkeye Arena	Iowa^{(25)}	118	Minnesota	104.25	Cary Kolat (Penn State)
1995	Bloomington, Indiana (Indiana)	Assembly Hall	Iowa^{(26)}	185	Michigan State	109.5	Kerry McCoy (Penn State)
1996	East Lansing, Michigan (Michigan State)	Jenison Fieldhouse	Iowa^{(27)}	154.5	Penn State	92	David Morgan (Michigan State)
1997	Minneapolis, Minnesota (Minnesota)	Williams Arena	Iowa^{(28)}	140.5	Minnesota	116.5	Mark Ironside (Iowa)
1998	University Park, Pennsylvania (Penn State)	Bryce Jordan Center	Iowa^{(29)}	132.5	Penn State	120.5	Jeff McGinness (Iowa)
1999	Ann Arbor, Michigan (Michigan)	Crisler Arena	Minnesota^{(5)}	139.0	Iowa	121.0	Jamie Heidt (Iowa)
2000	West Lafayette, Indiana (Purdue)	Mackey Arena	Iowa^{(30)}	139.5	Minnesota	132.5	Jody Strittmatter (Iowa)
2001	Evanston, Illinois (Northwestern)	Welsh–Ryan Arena	Minnesota^{(6)}	154.0	Illinois	130.5	Jared Lawrence (Minnesota)
2002	Champaign, Illinois (Illinois)	Assembly Hall	Minnesota^{(7)}	174.0	Iowa	129.0	Luke Moffitt (Iowa)
2003	Madison, Wisconsin (Wisconsin)	UW Field House	Minnesota^{(8)}	126.5	Iowa	121.0	Chris Fleeger (Purdue)
2004	Columbus, Ohio (Ohio State)	St. John Arena	Iowa^{(31)}	129.5	Minnesota	124.5	Alex Tirapelle (Illinois); Jacob Volkmann (Minnesota)
2005	Iowa City, Iowa (Iowa)	Carver–Hawkeye Arena	Illinois^{(17)}	130.0	Minnesota	123.5	Mack Reiter (Minnesota)
2006	Bloomington, Indiana (Indiana)	Assembly Hall	Minnesota^{(9)}	138.0	Illinois	125.0	Tom Clum (Wisconsin)
2007	East Lansing, Michigan (Michigan State)	Breslin Student Events Center	Minnesota^{(10)}	156.0	Wisconsin	99.5	Jake Herbert (Northwestern)
2008	Minneapolis, Minnesota (Minnesota)	Williams Arena	Iowa^{(32)}	127.0	Minnesota	112.5	Brent Metcalf (Iowa)
2009	University Park, Pennsylvania (Penn State)	Bryce Jordan Center	Iowa^{(33)}	141.0	Illinois	113.5	Brent Metcalf (Iowa)
2010	Ann Arbor, Michigan (Michigan)	Crisler Arena	Iowa^{(34)}	156.5	Minnesota	119.5	Lance Palmer (Ohio State)
2011	Evanston, Illinois (Northwestern)	Welsh–Ryan Arena	Penn State^{(1)}	139.0	Iowa	138.0	Quentin Wright (Penn State)
2012	West Lafayette, Indiana (Purdue)	Mackey Arena	Penn State^{(2)}	149.0	Minnesota	134.0	Frank Molinaro (Penn State); Kellen Russell (Michigan)
2013	Champaign, Illinois (Illinois)	Assembly Hall	Penn State^{(3)}	151.0	Minnesota	139.0	Ed Ruth (Penn State)
2014	Madison, Wisconsin (Wisconsin)	Kohl Center	Penn State^{(4)}	140.5	Iowa	135.0	David Taylor (Penn State)
2015	Columbus, Ohio (Ohio State)	St. John Arena	Iowa^{(35)} Ohio State^{(3)}	120.0	Minnesota	108.0	Logan Stieber (Ohio State)
2016	Iowa City, Iowa (Iowa)	Carver–Hawkeye Arena	Penn State^{(5)}	150.5	Iowa	127.0	Isaiah Martinez (Illinois)
2017	Bloomington, Indiana (Indiana)	Simon Skjodt Assembly Hall	Ohio State^{(4)}	139.5	Penn State	130.0	Zain Retherford (Penn State)
2018	East Lansing, Michigan (Michigan State)	Breslin Student Events Center	Ohio State^{(5)}	164.5	Penn State	148.0	Isaiah Martinez (Illinois)
2019	Minneapolis, Minnesota (Minnesota)	Williams Arena	Penn State^{(6)}	157.0	Ohio State	122.5	Alex Marinelli (Iowa); Jason Nolf (Penn State)
2020	Piscataway, New Jersey (Rutgers)	Rutgers Athletic Center	Iowa^{(36)}	157.5	Nebraska	132.0	Sebastian Rivera (Northwestern)
2021	University Park, Pennsylvania (Penn State)	Bryce Jordan Center	Iowa^{(37)}	159.5	Penn State	124.0	Gable Steveson (Minnesota)
2022	Lincoln, Nebraska (Nebraska)	Pinnacle Bank Arena	Michigan^{(12)}	143.0	Penn State	141.5	Myles Amine (Michigan); Austin Gomez (Wisconsin)
2023	Ann Arbor, Michigan (Michigan)	Crisler Center	Penn State^{(7)}	147.0	Iowa	134.5	Spencer Lee (Iowa)
2024	College Park, Maryland (Maryland)	Xfinity Center	Penn State^{(8)}	170.5	Michigan	123.5	Aaron Brooks (Penn State)
2025	Evanston, Illinois (Northwestern)	Welsh–Ryan Arena	Penn State^{(9)}	181.5	Nebraska	137.0	Carter Starocci (Penn State)
2026	University Park, Pennsylvania (Penn State)	Bryce Jordan Center	Penn State^{(10)}	184.0	Ohio State	148.5	PJ Duke (Penn State)

=== Champions by school ===
School	#	Year(s) won
Iowa	37	1915, 1916, 1958, 1962, 1974, 1975, 1976, 1977, 1978, 1979, 1980, 1981, 1982, 1983, 1984, 1985, 1986, 1987, 1988, 1989, 1990, 1991, 1992, 1993, 1994, 1995, 1996, 1997, 1998, 2000, 2004, 2008, 2009, 2010, 2015, 2020, 2021
Illinois	17	1913, 1917, 1920, 1922, 1924, 1925, 1926, 1927, 1928, 1930, 1932, 1935, 1937, 1946, 1947, 1952, 2005
Indiana	13	1914, 1915, 1921, 1924, 1925, 1931, 1932, 1933, 1934, 1936, 1939, 1940, 1943
Michigan	12	1929, 1938, 1944, 1953, 1955, 1956, 1960, 1963, 1964, 1965, 1973, 2022
Minnesota	10	1913, 1941, 1957, 1959, 1999, 2001, 2002, 2003, 2006, 2007
Penn State	10	2011, 2012, 2013, 2014, 2016, 2019, 2023, 2024, 2025, 2026
Michigan State	8	1961, 1966, 1967, 1968, 1969, 1970, 1971, 1972
Purdue	6	1942, 1945, 1948, 1949, 1950, 1954
Ohio State	5	1923, 1951, 2015, 2017, 2018

== Individual champions ==
=== 1911–1913 ===
Year	125	140	165	HWT
1911	Henry Ralph Richter	Glen Ruby	Walter Bodenhafer	E. B. Elliott
1912	Henry Ralph Richter	E. J. Brosius	Glen Ruby	Edgar C. Davis
1913	??? Linn	G. W. Schroeder	James E. Mee	Edgar C. Davis

=== 1914–1920 ===
Year	125	135	145	158	175	HWT
1914	Ralph J. Williams	Arthur W. Knott	??? Hobbet	Floyd E. Demmon	J.R. Cummins	Edgar C. Davis
1915	Albert Gran	David H. Bowman	Benjamin H. Drollinger	Richard B. Rutherford	Ward B. Freeman	Irving J. Barron
1916	??? Parrott	Irving Madigan	??? McKormick	Richard B. Rutherford	Hugo Otopalik	??? Redmon
1917	??? Parrott	R. H. Jeschke	E. V. Kurtzrock	Lorin V. Cope	Hugo Otopalik	Earl Harbison
1918	No meet held					
1919	No meet held					
1920	O.K. Ziegler	Harry Troendly	John I. Moore	R.T. Smith	H.L. Hoffman	Herman Whitson

=== 1921–1924 ===
Year	115	125	135	145	158	175	HWT
1921	??? Sogard	??? Myers	Charles B. Sweeney	Perry Martter	Guy Lookabaugh	Edward Wesley Mumby	Charles Hoyt
1922	??? Sogard	Edward Vana	Harold H. Bowen	Perry Martter	E.G. McKibbon	Stanton A. Troutman	Walt Spencer
1923	Ted J. Pfeffer	Alton L. Loucks	Harold H. Bowen	Fred C. Shepard	Floyd Reed	Omar C. Held	Joseph Greer
1924	Ted J. Pfeffer	John Kellogg	Robert F. Holmes	Dale Skinner	Ralph Prunty	Ralph Wilson	Harry Steel

=== 1925 ===
Year	115	125	135	145	158	HWT
1925	Harold Boyvey	Clell Kurtz	Robert Michael	Gerald Woodhull	Ralph Prunty	George L. Fisher

=== 1926–... ===
Year	115	125	135	145	158	175	HWT
1926	Royal A. Weir	Perry Snider	Stephen Easter	Leslie Beers	Theron Donahoe	Kaare Krogh	Daniel Whitacre

=== 1987–1998 ===
Year	118	126	134	142	150	158	167	177	190	275
1987
1988
1989
1990
1991
1992
1993
1994	Matt Hanutke	Sanshiro Abe	Cary Kolat	Dunyasha Yetts	Lincoln McIlravy	Sean Bormet	Ray Brinzer	Brad Gibson	Keith Davidson	Kerry McCoy
1995	Mike Mena	Jeff McGinness	Mark Ironside	John Hughes	Lincoln McIlravy	Dan Wirnsberger	Chad Biggert	Ray Brinzer	Joel Sharratt	Kerry McCoy
1996	David Morgan	Sanshiro Abe	Mark Ironside	Bill Zadick	Russ Hughes	Joe Williams	Daryl Weber	Rohan Gardner	Brian Picklo	Tony Vaughn
1997	David Morgan	Eric Jetton	Mark Ironside	Roger Chandler	Lincoln McIlravy	Ernest Benion	Kevin Wilmot	Mitch Clark	Tim Hartung	Kerry McCoy
1998	David Morgan	Eric Jetton	Mark Ironside	Jeff McGinness	Bill Lacure	John Lange	Joe Williams	Mitch Clark	Tim Hartung	Airron Richardson

=== 1999–present ===
Year	125	133	141	149	157	165	174	184	197	285
1999	Jeremy Hunter	Pat McNamara	Doug Schwab	T.J. Williams	Jamie Heidt	Don Pritzlaff	Glenn Pritzlaff	Brandon Eggum	Tim Hartung	Brock Lesnar
2000	Jody Strittmatter	Eric Juergens	Doug Schwab	Adam Tirapelle	T.J. Williams	Don Pritzlaff	Mark Bybee	Brandon Eggum	Nick Muzashvili	Brock Lesnar
2001	Jody Strittmatter	Eric Juergens	Doug Schwab	Jared Lawrence	T.J. Williams	Don Pritzlaff	Otto Olson	Nate Patrick	Pat Quirk	Garrett Lowney
2002	Leroy Vega	Ryan Lewis	Luke Moffitt	Mike Zadick	Luke Becker	Matt Lackey	Otto Olson	Damion Hahn	Owen Elzen	Tommy Rowlands
2003	Chris Fleeger	Cliff Moore	Scott Moore	Jared Lawrence	Luke Becker	Matt Lackey	Ryan Lange	Jessman Smith	Damion Hahn	Steve Mocco
2004	Tom Clum	Mark Jayne	Cliff Moore	Ryan Churella	Alex Tirapelle	Jacob Volkmann	Ryan Lange	Eric Bradley	Damion Hahn	Tommy Rowlands
2005	Nick Simmons	Mack Reiter	Josh Churella	Eric Tannenbaum	Alex Tirapelle	Ryan Churella	Pete Friedl	Eric Bradley	Matt Delguyd	Cole Konrad
2006	Nick Simmons	Tom Clum	Andy Simmons	Dustin Schlatter	C.P. Schlatter	Ryan Churella	Jake Herbert	Roger Kish	Phil Davis	Cole Konrad
2007	Jayson Ness	Nick Simmons	Ryan Lang	Dustin Schlatter	C.P. Schlatter	Mark Perry	Steve Luke	Jake Herbert	Mike Tamillow	Cole Konrad
2008	Angel Escobedo	Frank Gomez	Kellen Russell	Brent Metcalf	Mike Poeta	Eric Tannenbaum	Steve Luke	Mike Pucillo	Phil Davis	Dustin Fox
2009	Angel Escobedo	Frank Gomez	Kellen Russell	Brent Metcalf	Mike Poeta	Andrew Howe	Steve Luke	Jake Herbert	Tyrel Todd	Dan Erekson
2010	Angel Escobedo	Jayson Ness	Mike Thorn	Lance Palmer	Cyler Sanderson	Andrew Howe	Jay Borschel	John Dergo	Trevor Brandvold	Daniel Erekson
2011	Matt McDonough	Andrew Long	Kellen Russell	Frank Molinaro	David Taylor	Andrew Howe	Ed Ruth	Quentin Wright	Trevor Brandvold	Blake Raising
2012	Matt McDonough	Logan Stieber	Kellen Russell	Frank Molinaro	Jason Welch	David Taylor	Ed Ruth	Kevin Steinhaus	Sonny Yohn	Tony Nelson
2013	Jesse Delgado	Logan Stieber	Hunter Stieber	Dylan Ness	Jason Welch	David Taylor	Matt Brown	Ed Ruth	Quentin Wright	Tony Nelson
2014	Jesse Delgado	Tony Ramos	Logan Stieber	Jason Tsirtsis	James Green	David Taylor	Robert Kokesh	Ed Ruth	Nick Heflin	Tony Nelson
2015	Nathan Tomasello	Chris Dardanes	Logan Stieber	Jason Tsirtsis	Isaiah Martinez	Isaac Jordan	Robert Kokesh	Domenic Abounader	Morgan McIntosh	Mike McMullan
2016	Nathan Tomasello	Cory Clark	Anthony Ashnault	Zain Retherford	Isaiah Martinez	Isaac Jordan	Bo Nickal	Sammy Brooks	Morgan McIntosh	Kyle Snyder
2017	Thomas Gilman	Nathan Tomasello	Anthony Ashnault	Zain Retherford	Jason Nolf	Isaiah Martinez	Bo Jordan	Sammy Brooks	Kollin Moore	Kyle Snyder
2018	Nathan Tomasello	Stevan Mićić	Joey McKenna	Zain Retherford	Alec Pantaleo	Isaiah Martinez	Mark Hall	Bo Nickal	Kollin Moore	Kyle Snyder
2019	Sebastian Rivera	Nick Suriano	Joey McKenna	Anthony Ashnault	Jason Nolf	Alex Marinelli	Mark Hall	Myles Martin	Bo Nickal	Anthony Cassar
2020	Spencer Lee	Sebastian Rivera	Luke Pletcher	Pat Lugo	Ryan Deakin	Alex Marinelli	Mark Hall	Aaron Brooks	Kollin Moore	Gable Steveson
2021	Spencer Lee	Roman Bravo-Young	Jaydin Eierman	Sammy Sasso	Ryan Deakin	Alex Marinelli	Michael Kemerer	Aaron Brooks	Myles Amine	Gable Steveson
2022	Nick Suriano	Roman Bravo-Young	Nick Lee	Austin Gomez	Ryan Deakin	Alex Marinelli	Carter Starocci	Myles Amine	Max Dean	Gable Steveson
2023	Spencer Lee	Roman Bravo-Young	Real Woods	Sammy Sasso	Levi Haines	Dean Hamiti	Carter Starocci	Aaron Brooks	Silas Allred	Mason Parris
2024	Braeden Davis	Dylan Shawver	Jesse Mendez	Ridge Lovett	Levi Haines	Mitchell Mesenbrink	Edmond Ruth	Isaiah Salazar	Aaron Brooks	Greg Kerkvliet
2025	Luke Lilledahl	Lucas Byrd	Brock Hardy	Ridge Lovett	Tyler Kasak	Mitchell Mesenbrink	Levi Haines	Carter Starocci	Jacob Cardenas	Gable Stevenson
2026	Luke Lilledahl	Ben Davino	Jesse Mendez	Shayne Van Ness	P.J. Duke	Mitchell Mesenbrink	Levi Haines	Rocco Welsh	Josh Barr	Taye Ghadiali
