= Matt McDonough =

American wrestler (born 1990)

Personal information
- Born: May 12, 1990 (age 36) Cedar Rapids, Iowa, U.S.
- Height: 5.7 ft 0 in (174 cm)

Sport
- Country: United States
- Sport: Wrestling
- Weight class: 125.5 lb (57 kg)
- Event(s): Freestyle and Folkstyle
- College team: Iowa
- Club: Hawkeye Wrestling Club
- Coached by: Tom Brands and Terry Brands
Medal record
Representing the United States
Men's freestyle wrestling
University World Championships
Bronze medal – third place	2014 Pécs	57 kg
Paris Grand Prix
Bronze medal – third place	2015 Paris	61 kg
Men's collegiate wrestling
Representing the Iowa Hawkeyes
NCAA Division I Championships
Gold medal – first place	2010 Omaha	125 lb
Gold medal – first place	2012 St.Louis	125 lb
Silver medal – second place	2011 Philadelphia	125 lb
Big Ten Championships
Gold medal – first place	2011 Evanston	125 lb
Gold medal – first place	2012 West Lafayette	125 lb
Silver medal – second place	2010 Ann Arbor	125 lb
Silver medal – second place	2013 Champaign	125 lb

Matt McDonough (born May 12, 1990) is a two-time NCAA wrestling champion who attended the University of Iowa.

== High school and personal life ==
McDonough attended Linn-Mar High School in Marion, Iowa. His career high school record was 151–15. McDonough was a three-time Iowa wrestling state champion and four-time state place winner for Linn-Mar under head coach Doug Streicher. As a freshman, McDonough was a teammate of Jay Borschel, a four-time Iowa state champion, undefeated NCAA champion (2009–2010) and subject of the non-fiction wrestling book Four Days to Glory. McDonough's father Mike wrestled for Iowa in the 1970s.

== College career ==
=== 2009–2010 ===
McDonough made a surprise drop to 125 pounds as a freshman after competing his first year (when he was redshirting) at 133. After winning the starting spot in the Iowa Hawkeye lineup, McDonough achieved 23 dual victories as a team, including a record of 11–0 on his home mat at Carver–Hawkeye Arena. He also won a title at Northwestern University's Midlands Wrestling Tournament. McDonough received his first loss and only loss on the year in the Big Ten conference finals where returning NCAA champion Angel Escobedo defeated him. McDonough ended his season by winning the NCAA title over fellow freshman Andrew Long, of Iowa State.

=== 2010–2011 ===
McDonough returned for his sophomore season at 125 pounds and went 27–2 on the year, with one of those losses coming from Brandon Precin of Northwestern in a dual. McDonough later avenged the loss at the Big Ten conference tournament where McDonough won his first conference title. At the NCAA championships, McDonough finished second after losing to Anthony Robles in the finals.

McDonough also repeated as Midlands champion.

=== 2011–2012 ===
McDonough returned to the top of the 125 pound weight class as a junior when he defeated Nico Megaludis in the NCAA finals 4–1, which also was his 100th career victory in college. McDonough won his second Big Ten conference title over Zach Sanders on Minnesota. He went 36-1 and for the third straight year won a Midlands title.

=== 2012–2013 ===
McDonough ended his career in a Hawkeye singlet with a 22–5 record, giving him a career record of 122–9. He made his fourth Big Ten conference finals, but was unable to win his third straight title. McDonough sustained a shoulder injury which prevented him from making the top eight, which cost him his fourth All-American honors.

== International career ==
=== 2014 ===
The injury McDonough sustained in his senior year of college prevented him from getting back on the mat initially, but when he did he debuted at 61 kilograms at the Dave Schultz tournament.

In April 2014 he entered the U.S. Open tournament in Las Vegas and finished 4th at 61 kilos.

In May McDonough entered the World Team Trials at 57 kilos where he made his first attempt at making Team USA's freestyle team since college. It was the first time McDonough had been a weight that low since college (57 kg = 125.5 pounds). McDonough took 3rd in the tournament with his lone loss coming to Brandon Precin. He earned another victory over Nico Megaludis to make the national team.

The finish at the Trials allowed McDonough to challenge the University Nationals champion for their spot on the University Nationals team for a chance to compete in Hungary. McDonough won 16-10 and 15-5 in a best of three series over Nahshon Garrett (Cornell) to claim the 57 University spot.

In Hungary McDonough earned a bronze medal for Team USA, losing only to eventual champion Fumitaka Morishita of Japan.

=== 2015 ===
As a member of the national team at 57 kg, McDonough traveled on a multi-week overseas trip, that included two tournaments. The first tournament that the USA wrestlers competed in was the Ivan Yarygin Memorial tournament in Russia. McDonough went 0-1 at the Yarygin tournament. The following week McDonough traveled with USA wrestlers to France for the Paris Grand Prix where he competed at 57 kg. McDonough picked up a 9–8 win in the qualifying round, and then lost his next match to be eliminated. McDonough then weighed in to compete at 61 kg in Paris which led to him earning a bronze medal.

In April, McDonough picked up a 6–2 victory over 2013 World Team member Angel Escobedo at the AGON Wrestling Championships, which moved him up the National rankings to #2 behind teammate Tony Ramos. He also served as a 61 kg alternate to the second place World Cup team in LA, but never saw any action.

=== 2018 ===
Assistant coach at the University of Wisconsin alongside fellow assistant coach Jonathan Reader and Head coach Christopher Bono.
