= Daniel Dennis =

American freestyle wrestler (born 1986)

Personal information
- Born: September 24, 1986 (age 39) Ingleside, Illinois, U.S.

Sport
- Country: United States
- Sport: Wrestling
- Events: Freestyle and Folkstyle
- College team: Iowa
- Club: Hawkeye Wrestling Club
- Team: USA
- Coached by: Tom Brands; Terry Brands
Medal record
Representing the United States
Men's freestyle wrestling
Grand Prix
Gold medal – first place	2015 Madrid	57 kg
Gold medal – first place	2016 Dortmund	57 kg
Men's collegiate wrestling
Representing the Iowa Hawkeyes
NCAA Division I Championships
Silver medal – second place	2010 Omaha	133 lb
Big Ten Championships
Silver medal – second place	2010 Ann Arbor	133 lb

Daniel Dennis (born September 24, 1986) is an American former freestyle and folkstyle wrestler, who competed for the United States at 57 KG in the 2016 Olympics.

== High school career ==
Dennis was a two-time Illinois state runner-up for Grant Community High School in Fox Lake, Illinois.

== College career ==
Dennis wrestled collegiately for the Iowa Hawkeyes, where he was a two-time All-American, including a national runner-up finish in 2010. In the 2010 NCAA finals match, Dennis gave up four points with under five seconds left to the University of Minnesota's Jayson Ness to lose the match. After his NCAA finals loss, Dennis checked out for a few years, living out of his truck and later a trailer, traveling around the Western United States while wrestling and coaching sporadically. He eventually became a coach at Windsor High School in California.

== Senior level career ==
Dennis would eventually make a return to wrestling, where he made two USA national teams (top 3 at the World Team Trials), at 61 kg in 2015 and 57 kg in 2016. He won the 2016 US Olympic Team Trials at 57 KG and competed at the 2016 Olympics in Rio. Dennis lost his first match 11-0 to Vladimir Dubov and was eliminated after Dubov didn't reach the finals. He has also won the University Nationals Freestyle championship, the Grand Prix of Spain, the Grand Prix of Germany, and was a two-time Northern Plains regional champion.
