= 2014 NCAA Division I Wrestling Championships =

2014 NCAA Division I Wrestling Tournament
- Format: Double-elimination
- Finals site: Oklahoma City, Oklahoma; Paycom Center
- Champions: Penn State (5th title)
- Runner-up: Minnesota
- Semifinalists: Oklahoma State; Iowa
- Winning coach: Cael Sanderson (4th title)
- MVP: David Taylor (2nd) (Penn State)
- Attendance: 93,334
- Television: ESPN Networks

The 2014 NCAA Division I Wrestling Championships took place from March 20 to March 22 in Oklahoma City at the Paycom Center. The tournament was the 84th NCAA Division I Wrestling Championships. The Penn State won their fourth consecutive title, and fifth overall.

== Team results ==
- Note: Top 10 only
- (H): Team from hosting U.S. state
- Number of individual champions in parentheses

Rank	Team	Points
1	Penn State	109 1/2 (2)
2	Minnesota	104
3	Oklahoma State (H)	96 1/2 (2)
4	Iowa	78 1/2 (1)
5	Edinboro	62
6	Ohio State	57 (1)
7	Cornell	53
8	Virginia Tech	49
9	Northern Iowa	46
9	Oklahoma (H)	45

== Individual results ==
- Note: Table does not include wrestlebacks
- (H): Individual from hosting U.S. State

Weight	First	Second	Third
125 lbs	Jesse Delgado; Illinois	Nahshon Garrett; Cornell	Nico Megaludis; Penn State
133 lbs	Tony Ramos; Iowa	Tyler Graff; Wisconsin	Joe Colon; Northern Iowa
141 lbs	Logan Stieber; Ohio State	Devin Carter; Virginia Tech	Mitchell Port; Edinboro
149 lbs	Jason Tsirtsis; Northwestern	Joshua Kindig; Oklahoma State	Eric Grajales; Michigan
157 lbs	Alex Dieringer; Oklahoma State	Dylan Ness; Minnesota	James Green; Nebraska
165 lbs	David Taylor; Penn State	Tyler Caldwell; Oklahoma State	Steve Monk; North Dakota State
174 lbs	Chris Perry; Oklahoma State	Andrew Howe; Oklahoma	Logan Storley; Minnesota
184 lbs	Ed Ruth; Penn State	Jimmy Sheptock; Maryland	Gabe Dean; Cornell
197 lbs	J'den Cox; Missouri	Nick Heflin; Ohio State	Scott Schiller; Minnesota
285 lbs	Nick Gwiazdowski; NC State	Anthony Nelson; Minnesota	Michael McMullan; Northwestern
