= Kevin Dresser =

American wrestler and coach (born 1962)

Current position
- Title: Head coach
- Team: Iowa State
- Conference: Big 12
- Record: 48–23
- Annual salary: $300,000

Biographical details
- Born: November 9, 1962 (age 63); Fort Dodge, Iowa, U.S.
- Education: Iowa

Playing career
- 1981–1986: Iowa

Coaching career (HC unless noted)
- 1986–1988: Iowa (asst.)
- 1988–1996: Grundy HS
- 1996–2006: Christiansburg HS
- 2006–2017: Virginia Tech
- 2017–present: Iowa State

Head coaching record
- Overall: 208–74

Accomplishments and honors

Championships
- 2012–13 ACC Tournament; 2013–14 ACC Tournament; 2014–15 ACC Dual Championship; 2015–16 ACC Dual Championship; 2016–17 ACC Dual Championship

Medal record

Collegiate Wrestling

Representing the Iowa Hawkeyes

NCAA Division I Championships
Gold medal – first place	1986 Iowa City	142 lb

Big Ten Championships
Gold medal – first place	1985 Evanston	142 lb
Gold medal – first place	1986 Minneapolis	142 lb

Kevin Dresser (November 9, 1962) is a collegiate wrestling coach, currently at Iowa State University and formerly at Virginia Tech (2006–2017). Dresser had also been a coach at Christiansburg HS, Grundy HS, and an assistant at the University of Iowa, after having wrestled for the Hawkeyes.

== Early life ==
Born in Fort Dodge and a native of Humboldt, Iowa, Dresser was a two-time high school wrestling state champion and four time place winner fifth (freshman) and sixth (sophomore) at Humboldt High School. Kevin had a high school record of 112-11-1, he holds his school's records for number of takedowns and pins. Kevin matriculated to the University of Iowa where he was an NCAA National Champion at 142 pounds in 1986. He was also a two-time NCAA All-American and two-time Big Ten Conference Champion. Kevin had an NCAA record of 34-2-1 with 16 falls. His coach at Iowa was wrestling legend Dan Gable. In 1986, he was given the Mike Howard Award as the most valuable wrestler for the Hawkeyes that season.

== Early coaching career ==
He coached under Dan Gable at Iowa for several years after graduation. He then accepted a position as head wrestling coach at Grundy High School in Grundy, Virginia. Dresser led the Virginia powerhouse to eight Virginia state titles in eight years.

Dresser then moved to Christiansburg, Virginia to take over the wrestling program at Christiansburg High School. He successfully built the team from scratch and led them to five consecutive Virginia team state championships. During his tenure, Christiansburg High School was ranked as high as fourth in the nation.

== Collegiate coaching career ==
=== Virginia Tech ===
Kevin Dresser took over as head coach for the Virginia Tech Hokies wrestling team in 2006, upon the departure of Tom Brands.

Dresser went 160-51 in 11 seasons. The team earned two ACC Tournament Championships (2012–13 and 2013–14) and three ACC Dual Championships (2014–15, 2015–16, and 2016–17), during his tenure.

Kevin was named the 2016 NWCA Coach of the Year.

=== Iowa State ===
Nearing the end of the 2016-17 season, Kevin Dresser accepted an offer to be the new head coach of wrestling at Iowa State University.Bringing with him his wife Penny, oldest daughter Emma, middle daughter Anna, and youngest son, Jack. Dresser coached the Cyclones to the 2024 Big XII team wrestling championship. He was also named the Big XII coach of the year in 2019 and 2024. He signed a 7-year, $2.25 million contract.
