= Big Ten Athlete of the Year =

American college athletic award

The Big Ten Athlete of the Year award is given annually to the top male and female collegiate athletes in the Big Ten Conference. It was first awarded in 1982, with winners being selected by a panel of conference media members from nominations submitted by each school.

== History ==
In 1982, the Big Ten Conference established their athlete of the year award, with the winners being selected by a panel of conference media members from nominations submitted by each school. The award for male winners is named after Ohio State track star Jesse Owens. The woman's award was previously known as the Suzy Favor Athlete of the Year before it was revealed in 2012 that Favor had worked as a prostitute for a Las Vegas escort service. The Big Ten removed her name from the women's award in July 2013 as a result.

== Winners ==
=== Male ===
Officially known as the Big Ten Jesse Owens Male Athlete of the Year award

Year	Athlete(s)	School	Sport(s)
1982	Jim Spivey	Indiana	Track and field, cross country
1983	Ed Banach	Iowa	Wrestling
1984	Sunder Nix	Indiana	Track and field
1985	Barry Davis	Iowa	Wrestling
1986	Chuck Long	Iowa	Football
1987	Steve Alford	Indiana	Basketball
1988	Jim Abbott	Michigan	Baseball
1989	Glen Rice	Michigan	Basketball
1990	Anthony Thompson	Indiana	Football
1991	Mike Barrowman	Michigan	Swimming and diving
1992	Desmond Howard	Michigan	Football
1993	John Roethlisberger	Minnesota	Gymnastics
1994	Glenn Robinson	Purdue	Basketball
1995	Tom Dolan	Michigan	Swimming and diving
1996	Eddie George	Ohio State	Football
1997	Blaine Wilson	Ohio State	Gymnastics
1998	Charles Woodson	Michigan	Football
1999	Luke Donald	Northwestern	Golf
2000	Ron Dayne	Wisconsin	Football
2001	Ryan Miller	Michigan State	Ice hockey
2002	Jordan Leopold	Minnesota	Ice hockey
2003	Amer Delić	Illinois	Tennis
2003	Matt Lackey	Illinois	Wrestling
2004	Damion Hahn	Minnesota	Wrestling
2005	Luis Vargas	Penn State	Gymnastics
2006	Peter Vanderkaay	Michigan	Swimming and diving
2007	Cole Konrad	Minnesota	Wrestling
2008	Brent Metcalf	Iowa	Wrestling
2009	Jake Herbert	Northwestern	Wrestling
2010	Evan Turner	Ohio State	Basketball
2011	David Boudia	Purdue	Swimming and diving
2012	Draymond Green	Michigan State	Basketball
2013	Derek Drouin	Indiana	Track and field
2014	David Taylor	Penn State	Wrestling
2015	Logan Stieber	Ohio State	Wrestling
2016	Denzel Valentine	Michigan State	Basketball
2017	Kyle Snyder	Ohio State	Wrestling
2018	Kyle Snyder	Ohio State	Wrestling
2019	Bo Nickal	Penn State	Wrestling
2020	Chase Young	Ohio State	Football
2021	Luka Garza	Iowa	Basketball
2022	Gable Steveson	Minnesota	Wrestling
2023	Zach Edey	Purdue	Basketball
2024	Zach Edey	Purdue	Basketball
2025	Carter Starocci	Penn State	Wrestling
2026	Fernando Mendoza	Indiana	Football

=== Female ===
Year	Athlete(s)	School	Sport(s)
1983	Judi Brown	Michigan State	Track and field
1984	Lisa Ishikawa	Northwestern	Softball
1985	Cathy Branta	Wisconsin	Track and field / Cross country
1986	Stephanie Herbst	Wisconsin	Track and field / Cross country
1987	Jennifer Averill	Northwestern	Field hockey / Lacrosse
1988	Suzy Favor	Wisconsin	Track and field / Cross country
1989	Suzy Favor	Wisconsin	Track and field / Cross country
1990	Suzy Favor	Wisconsin	Track and field / Cross country
1991	Julie Farrell-Ovenhouse	Michigan State	Swimming and diving
1991	Joy Holmes	Purdue	Basketball
1992	MaChelle Joseph	Purdue	Basketball
1993	Lara Hooiveld	Michigan	Swimming and diving
1994	Kristy Gleason	Iowa	Field hockey
1995	Laura Davis	Ohio State	Volleyball
1996	Olga Kalinovskaya	Penn State	Fencing
1997	Gretchen Hegener	Minnesota	Swimming and diving
1997	Kathy Butler	Wisconsin	Track and field
1998	Sara Griffin	Michigan	Softball
1999	Stephanie White-McCarty	Purdue	Basketball
2000	Lauren Cacciamani	Penn State	Volleyball
2001	Katie Douglas	Purdue	Basketball
2002	Christie Welsh	Penn State	Soccer
2003	Perdita Felicien	Illinois	Track and field
2004	Kelly Mazzante	Penn State	Basketball
2005	Jennie Ritter	Michigan	Softball
2006	Tiffany Weimer	Penn State	Soccer
2007	Jessica Davenport	Ohio State	Basketball
2008	Hannah Nielsen	Northwestern	Lacrosse
2009	María Hernández	Purdue	Golf
2010	Megan Hodge	Penn State	Volleyball
2011	Shannon Smith	Northwestern	Lacrosse
2012	Christina Manning	Ohio State	Track and field
2013	Amanda Kessel	Minnesota	Ice hockey
2014	Dani Bunch	Purdue	Track and field
2015	Taylor Cummings	Maryland	Lacrosse
2016	Rachel Banham	Minnesota	Basketball
2017	Lilly King	Indiana	Swimming and diving
2018	Lilly King	Indiana	Swimming and diving
2019	Megan Gustafson	Iowa	Basketball
2020	Dana Rettke	Wisconsin	Volleyball
2021	Sarah Bacon	Minnesota	Swimming and diving
2022	Dana Rettke	Wisconsin	Volleyball
2023	Caitlin Clark	Iowa	Basketball
2024	Caitlin Clark	Iowa	Basketball
2025	JuJu Watkins	USC	Basketball
2026	Lauren Betts	UCLA	Basketball
