= Carver–Hawkeye Arena =

University of Iowa sports arena

- Carver; The House that Lute Built
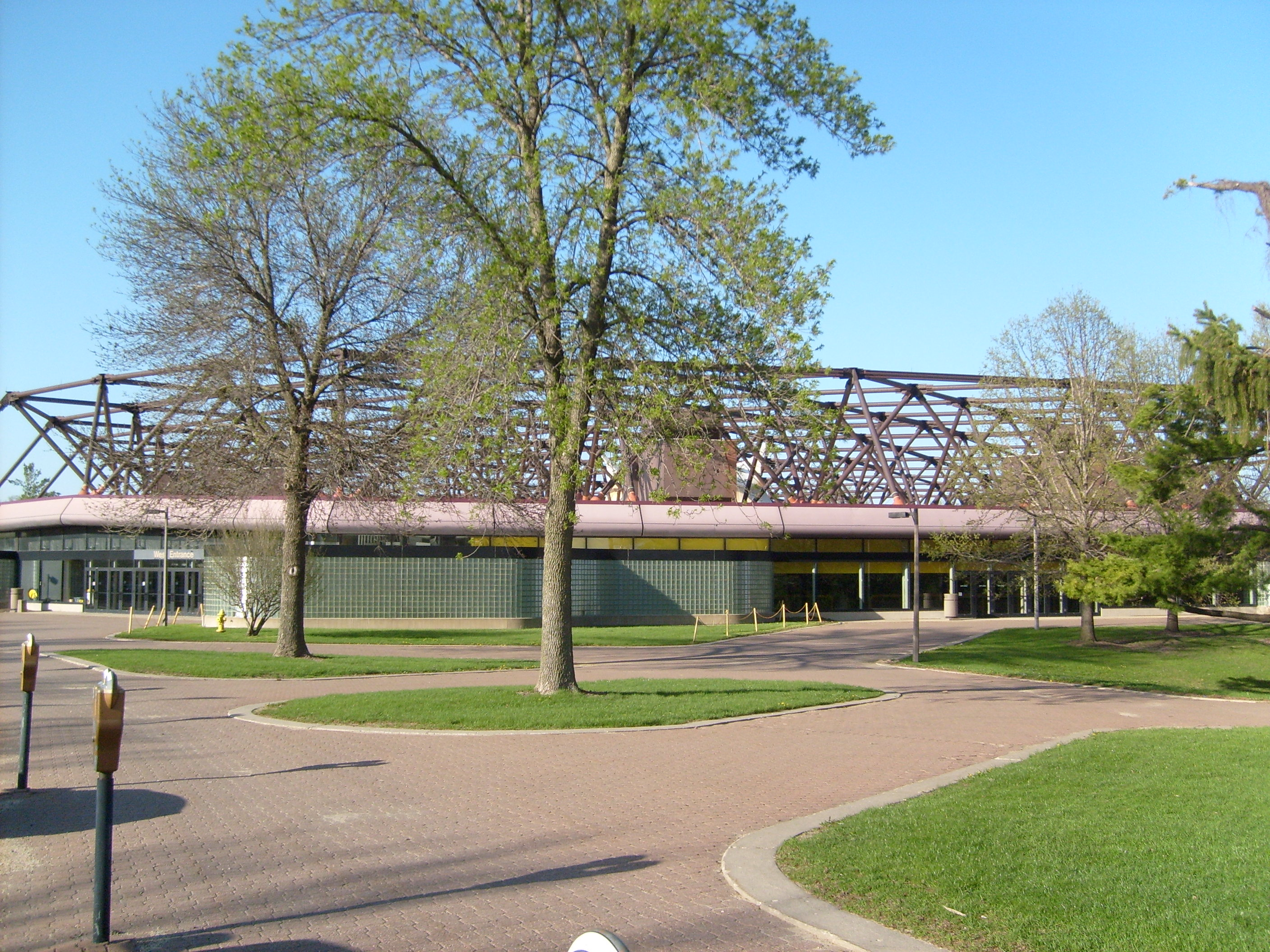
- Interactive map of Carver–Hawkeye Arena
- Former names: Hawkeye Sports Arena (planning)
- Address: 1 Elliott Dr; Iowa City, IA 52242
- Location: University of Iowa
- Coordinates: 41°39′49″N 91°33′16″W
- Capacity: 14,998 (2023–present); 15,056 (2018–2023); 15,400 (2011–18); 15,500 (1983–2011)
- Surface: Parquet

Construction
- Groundbreaking: July 15, 1980
- Opened: January 3, 1983
- Renovated: 2009–11
- Cost: $18.4 million ($71.9 million in 2025 dollars)
- Architects: Caudill Rowlett Scott; Durant Group
- Structural engineer: Geiger Berger Associates
- General contractor: CRS/Knutson

Tenants
- Iowa men's basketball Iowa women's basketball Iowa women's volleyball Iowa wrestling

The Carver–Hawkeye Arena is a multi-purpose indoor arena located in Iowa City, Iowa. Opened in 1983, it is the home court for the University of Iowa Hawkeyes men's and women's basketball teams, as well as the university's wrestling and gymnastics teams. It was named for the late industrialist Roy J. Carver of Muscatine, Iowa, a prominent statewide booster who donated $9.2 million to the University of Iowa before his death in 1981. Prior to the arena's opening, Iowa's athletic teams played at the Iowa Field House.

== History ==
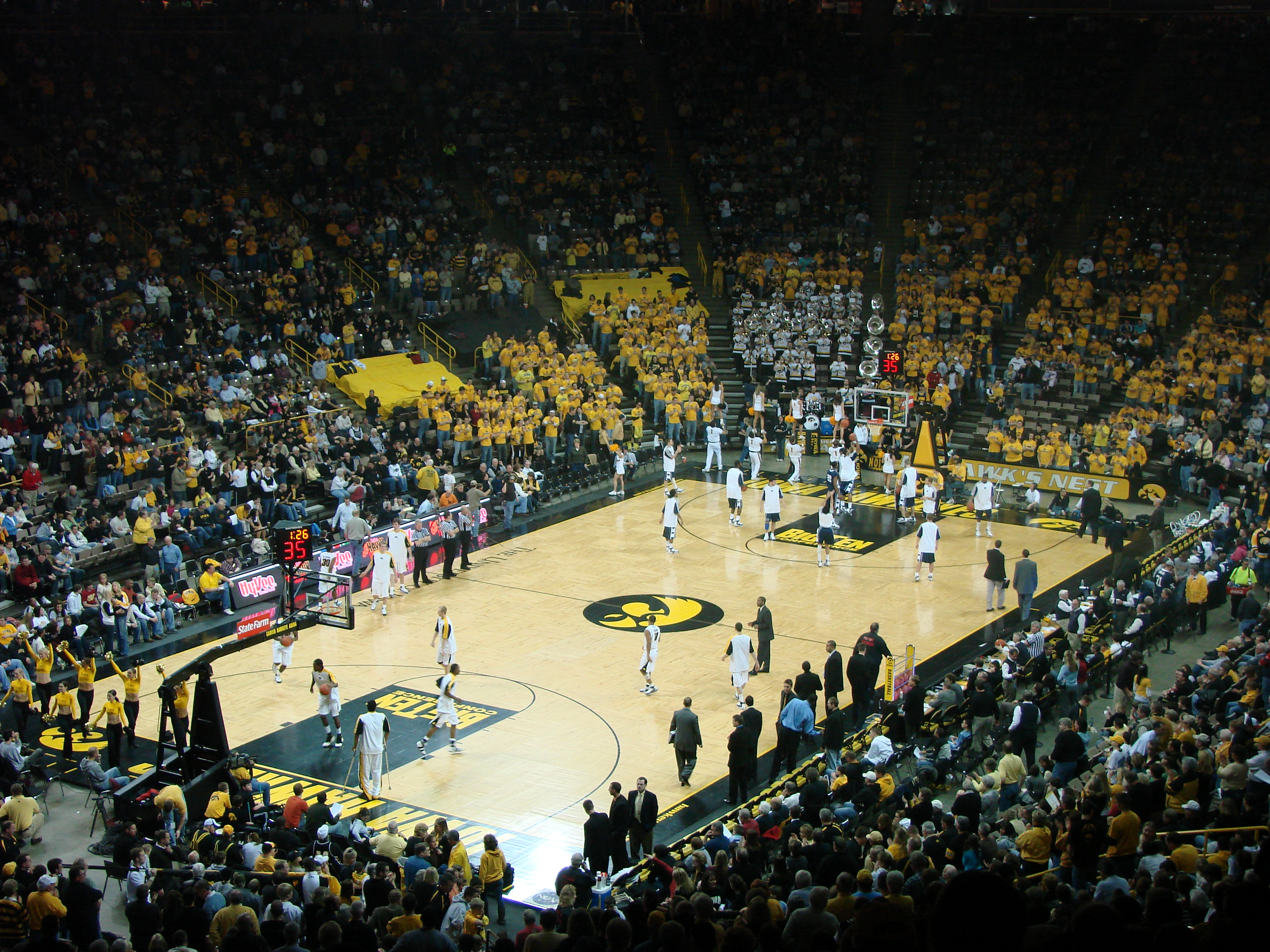
Arena during a 2008 game versus Penn State

Prior to playing in Carver–Hawkeye Arena, Iowa teams played in Close Hall (1902–1905) and then the first Iowa Armory (1905–1922). The first Armory was at the site of the current UI Communications Center building currently sits, across from the Library on the East Side of the Iowa River. Iowa teams moved to the second Iowa Armory (1922–1926), and then to the adjoining Iowa Field House (1926–1982), built directly beside the second Iowa Armory, which was incorporated into the new Field House facility.

In 1927, the Iowa Field House was opened during Paul Belding's tenure as athletic director. Considered as a "magnificent structure for its day," the Field House was home to Iowa's basketball and wrestling teams and included an indoor track and swimming pool.

The Field House, however, was known for its steel balconies and sub-par acoustics, along with columns that obstructed views. When demand was high for Hawkeye basketball, bleachers were placed behind the baskets, allowing some 15,000 to attend games. Season ticket sales increased during the highly successful tenures of head coaches Ralph Miller and Lute Olson, and support for a new arena gradually increased. Following approval from the Iowa Board of Regents, construction of Carver–Hawkeye Arena began.

Entirely funded by private contributions, the arena was expected to be open for the 1982–83 school year, but weather slowed construction to the point where the first event was held on January 3, 1983. Iowa's wrestling team defeated Oklahoma and two days later, the men's basketball team played their first game – a loss to Michigan State – in the new arena.

An NCAA attendance record for women's basketball was set on February 3, 1985. 22,157 were in attendance at Carver-Hawkeye arena as Iowa lost to rival Ohio State.

A logo commemorates the 25th anniversary of Carver-Hawkeye Arena.

Notable athletic events in the arena include the Big Ten and NCAA wrestling championships, the National Duals, the U.S. Olympic wrestling trials in 1984 and 2012, the UWW World Cup in 2018, and the NCAA Women's Division I Basketball Tournament.

The arena also serves as the site of commencement exercises for several of the university's colleges, and has hosted concerts by artists such as U2, Whitney Houston, Stevie Nicks, *NSYNC, Metallica, Guns N' Roses, Old Dominion, and Red Hot Chili Peppers, and speeches by Former Presidents Jimmy Carter and Bill Clinton as well as Desmond Tutu and Jane Goodall. Carver-Hawkeye also hosted many events in place of Hancher Auditorium and Cedar Rapids' U.S. Cellular Center while both venues underwent renovations after the Iowa flood of 2008.

On December 6, 2008, Iowa set the national collegiate wrestling dual meet attendance record as 15,955 fans packed the arena for the Iowa-Iowa State match. The previous record of 15,646 was set Feb. 1, 2002, when Minnesota hosted Iowa at the Target Center in Minneapolis. Barry Davis, Tom Brands, Brent Metcalf, Tony Ramos, and Spencer Lee are the only Hawkeye wrestlers to never lose a match during their college career in Carver–Hawkeye Arena.

In 2016, a new scoreboard was added to the arena. It measures at 14.5 feet (4.4 m) high by 26 feet (7.9 m) wide.

On April 7 and 8, 2018, the arena hosted the Wrestling World Cup.

A #22 marker is on the basketball court there at the spot where guard Caitlin Clark surpassed Kelsey Plum's NCAA women's career scoring record against Michigan on February 15, 2024 in a 106–89 win. The arena also hosted an exhibition game between the WNBA's Indiana Fever – including Clark after the franchise selected her first overall in the 2024 draft – and Brazil on May 4, 2025. The Fever won 108–44, with the game including Clark making a shot into the same basket beyond the marker in the third quarter.

== See also ==
- List of NCAA Division I basketball arenas
