= 1986 NCAA Division I Wrestling Championships =

American collegiate wrestling tournament

Tournament information
- Sport: College wrestling
- Location: Iowa City, Iowa
- Dates: March 13, 1986–March 15, 1986
- Host: University of Iowa
- Venue: Carver–Hawkeye Arena

Final positions
- Champions: Iowa (11th title)
- 1st runners-up: Oklahoma
- 2nd runners-up: Oklahoma State

Tournament statistics
- Attendance: 63,156
- MVP: Marty Kistler (Iowa)

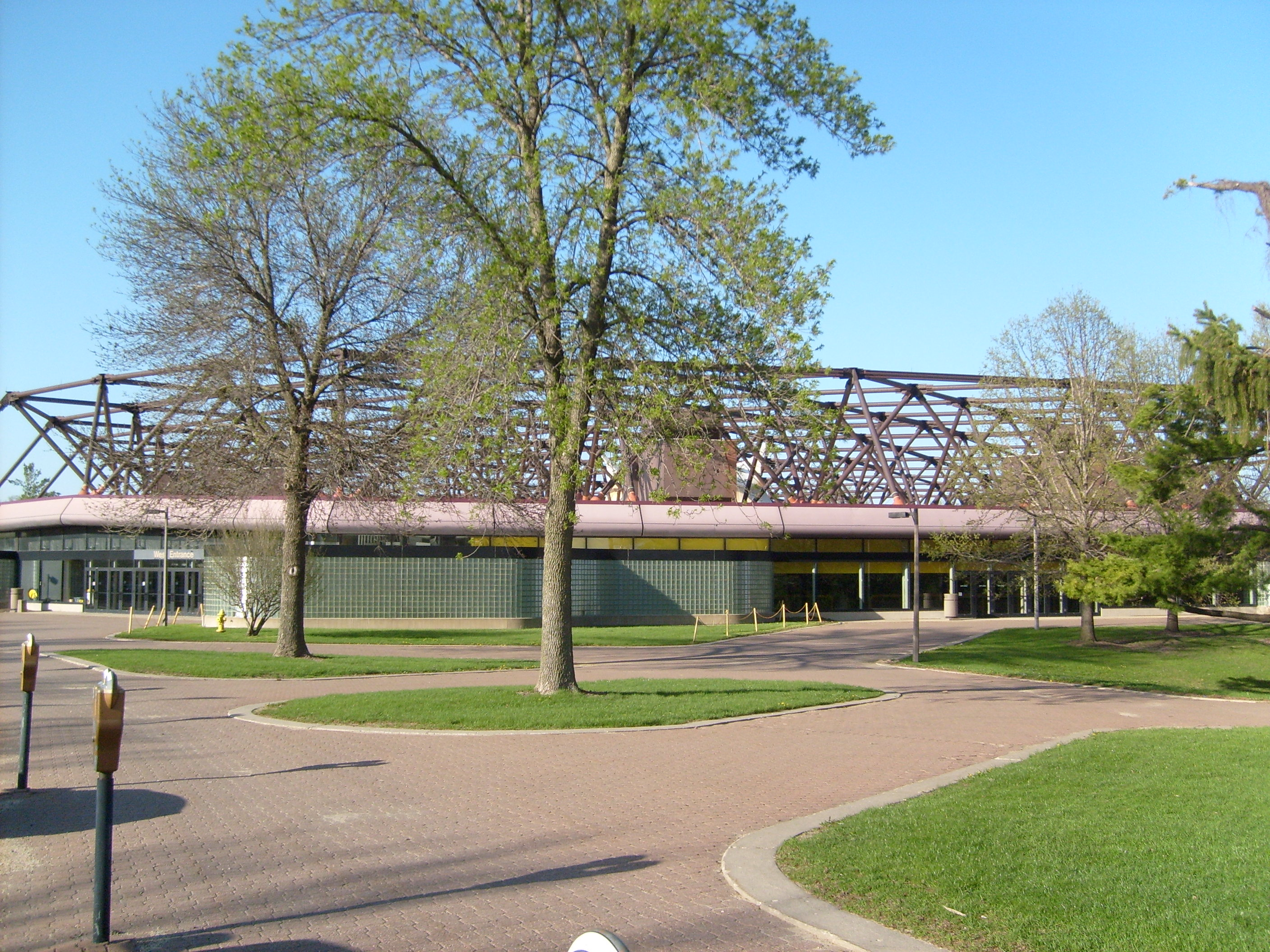
Carver-Hawkeye Arena, University of Iowa, Iowa City, Iowa

The 1986 NCAA Division I Wrestling Championships were the 56th NCAA Division I Wrestling Championships to be held. The University of Iowa in Iowa City, Iowa hosted the tournament at Carver–Hawkeye Arena.

Iowa took home the team championship with 158 points and having five individual champions.

Marty Kistler of Iowa was named the Most Outstanding Wrestler and Gary Albright of Nebraska received the Gorriaran Award.

== Team results ==
Rank	School	Points
1	Iowa	158
2	Oklahoma	84.75
3	Oklahoma State	77.25
4	Iowa State	71
5	Penn State	47.25
6	North Carolina	38.75
7	Bloomsburg	27.75
8	Arizona State	36.5
9	Lehigh	32.75
10	Michigan	32

== Individual finals ==
Weight class	Championship match (champion in boldface)
118 lbs	**Ricky Bonomo**, Bloomsburg DEC Al Palacio, North Carolina, 9–4
126 lbs	**Brad Penrith**, Iowa DEC Dennis Semmel, Army, 9–4
134 lbs	**Jim Jordan**, Wisconsin DEC Greg Randall, Iowa, 6–2
142 lbs	**Kevin Dresser**, Iowa DEC Peter Yozzo, Lehigh, 11–6
150 lbs	**Jim Heffernan**, Iowa DEC Adam Cohen, Arizona State, 10–3
158 lbs	**Jude Skove**, Ohio State DEC Greg Elinsky, Penn State, 5–2
167 lbs	**Marty Kistler**, Iowa MAJOR Mark van Tine, Oklahoma State, 15–3
177 lbs	**Melvin Douglas**, Oklahoma DEC Wayne Catan, Syracuse, 9–5
190 lbs	**Duane Goldman**, Iowa DEC Dan Chaid, Oklahoma, 5–4
UNL	**Kirk Trost**, Michigan DEC John Heropoulos, Iowa State, 6–3
