= 1999 Big Ten Wrestling Championships =

- Classification: Division I
- Teams: 11
- Site: Crisler Arena; Ann Arbor, Michigan
- Champions: Minnesota (5th title)
- Winning coach: J Robinson (1st title)
- MOW: Jamie Heidt (Iowa)

The 1999 Big Ten Wrestling Championships took place from March 6–7, 1999, in Ann Arbor, Michigan at Crisler Arena.

Minnesota under head coach J Robinson won their fifth Big Ten Conference championship, ending Iowa's streak of 25 consecutive championships.

== Team results ==
Rank	Team	Points
1st place, gold medalist(s)	Minnesota	139.0
2nd place, silver medalist(s)	Iowa	121.0
3rd place, bronze medalist(s)	Penn State	109.0
4	Illinois	82.5
5	Michigan (H)	76.5
6	Wisconsin	59.50
7	Northwestern	56.5
8	Michigan State	53.5
9	Indiana	48.0
10	Purdue	31.5
11	Ohio State	30.0

== Individual results ==
Weight class	First	Second	Third
125 lbs	#1 Jeremy Hunter; Penn State	#6 Pat Cassidy; Indiana	Leroy Vega; Minnesota
133 lbs	#1 Pat McNamara; Michigan State	#3 Joe Warren; Michigan (H)	Eric Juergens; Iowa
141 lbs	#1 Doug Schwab; Iowa	#2 Damion Logan; Michigan (H)	Carl Perry; Illinois
149 lbs	#1 T.J. Williams; Iowa	#2 Troy Marr; Minnesota	Adam Tirapelle; Illinois
157 lbs	#4 Jamie Heidt; Iowa	#2 Clint Musser; Penn State	Chad Kraft; Minnesota
165 lbs	#1 Don Pritzlaff; Wisconsin	#2 Josh Holiday; Minnesota	Bill Zeman; Illinois
174 lbs	#2 Glenn Pritzlaff; Penn State	#4 Mark Bybee; Northwestern	Otto Olson; Michigan (H)
184 lbs	#1 Brandon Eggum; Minnesota	#7 Ross Thatcher; Penn State	Viktor Sveda; Indiana
197 lbs	#1 Tim Hartung; Minnesota	#2 Lee Fullhart; Iowa	Nick Muzashvili; Michigan State
285 lbs	#1 Brock Lesnar; Minnesota	#3 Karl Roesler; Illinois	Mark Janus; Penn State
