= 1984 NCAA Division I Wrestling Championships =

American collegiate wrestling tournament

Coordinates: 40.34317°N 74.64866°W

Tournament information
- Sport: College wrestling
- Location: East Rutherford, New Jersey
- Dates: March 8, 1984–March 10, 1984
- Host: Princeton University
- Venue: Brendan Byrne Arena

Final positions
- Champions: Iowa (9th title)
- 1st runners-up: Oklahoma State
- 2nd runners-up: Penn State

Tournament statistics
- Attendance: 47,343
- MVP: Jim Zalesky (Iowa)

The 1984 NCAA Division I Wrestling Championships were the 54th NCAA Division I Wrestling Championships to be held. Princeton University hosted the tournament at Brendan Byrne Arena in East Rutherford, New Jersey.

Iowa took home the team championship with 123.75 points and having one individual champion.

Jim Zalesky of Iowa was named the Most Outstanding Wrestler and Tab Thacker of North Carolina State received the Gorriaran Award.

== Team results ==
Rank	School	Points
1	Iowa	123.75
2	Oklahoma State	98
3	Penn State	70.5
4	Nebraska	61
5	Oklahoma	51.5
6	Wisconsin	49.5
7	Iowa State	40.25
8	Louisiana State	38.75
9	Michigan State	29.25
10	Missouri	29

== Individual finals ==
Weight class	Championship match (champion in boldface)
118 lbs	**Carl DeStefanis**, Penn State DEC Bob Hallman, Northern Iowa, 6–4
126 lbs	**Kevin Darkus**, Iowa State DEC Joe McFarland, Michigan, 9–6
134 lbs	**Scott Lynch**, Penn State DEC Greg Randall, Iowa, 13–6
142 lbs	**Jesse Reyes**, Cal State-Bakersfield DEC John Orr, Princeton, 19–11
150 lbs	**Kenny Monday**, Oklahoma State DEC Marty Kistler, Iowa, 7–2
158 lbs	**Jim Zalesky**, Iowa DEC Mark Schmitz, Wisconsin, 7–2
167 lbs	**Mike Sheets**, Oklahoma State DEC Lindley Kistler, Iowa, 9–0
177 lbs	**Jim Scherr**, Nebraska DEC Duane Goldman, Iowa, 3–2
190 lbs	**Bill Scherr**, Nebraska DEC Jim Baumgardner, Oregon State, 13–4
UNL	**Tab Thacker**, North Carolina State DEC Gary Albright, Nebraska, 3–1
