= Tab Thacker =

American wrestler and actor (1962–2007)

Personal information
- Full name: Talmadge Layne Thacker
- Born: March 10, 1962 Winston-Salem, North Carolina, U.S.
- Died: December 28, 2007 (aged 45) Raleigh, North Carolina, U.S.
- Education: North Carolina State University
- Occupations: Actor, Wrestler
- Height: 6 ft 4 in (193 cm)
- Weight: 450 lb (204 kg)
Medal record
Collegiate Wrestling
Representing the NC State Wolfpack
NCAA Division I Championships
Gold medal – first place	1984 East Rutherford	Heavyweight
ACC Championships
Gold medal – first place	1981 Durham	Heavyweight
Gold medal – first place	1982 Chapel Hill	Heavyweight
Gold medal – first place	1983 College Park	Heavyweight
Gold medal – first place	1984 Clemson	Heavyweight

Talmadge Layne "Tab" Thacker (March 10, 1962 – December 28, 2007) was an American wrestler and actor.

== Early life ==
Thacker was on the football, basketball, track, and wrestling teams while at West Forsyth High School in Clemmons, North Carolina. At the North Carolina wrestling state championships, he placed fourth in 1979 and third in 1980. Thacker would then go on to win the 1980 Junior Greco-Roman wrestling national championship, before enrolling at NC State.

== College ==
As a wrestler at NC State, Thacker was a three-time NCAA Division I All-American and won a national title his senior year. His three All-American trips to the podium consisted of finishing eighth as a sophomore in 1982, sixth as a junior in 1983, and winning the national championship as a senior in 1984. He was also a four-time Atlantic Coast Conference (ACC) champion for the Wolfpack. Thacker finished his college career 92-11-1, ranking second in NC State history with an .889 winning percentage and 54 pins. He majored in criminal justice while at NC State.

== Professional career ==
He began his film career after Clint Eastwood noticed him in Time magazine and noted the 6-foot-4 and 450-pound (1.93 m, 204 kg) Thacker's size. Thacker went on to appear in several films including City Heat, Wildcats, two of the Police Academy films, and Identity Crisis.

After leaving Hollywood, Thacker returned to Raleigh, North Carolina, where he opened a remodeling business and operated several nightclubs. He later became a bail bondsman.

== Filmography ==
Year	Title	Role	Notes
1984	City Heat	Tuck	
1986	Wildcats	Phillip Finch	
1987	Police Academy 4: Citizens on Patrol	Thomas 'House' Conklin	
1988	Police Academy 5: Assignment Miami Beach	Thomas 'House' Conklin	
1989	Identity Crisis	I.Q.	(final film role)

== Death ==
A North Carolina native, Thacker died in Raleigh, North Carolina on December 27, 2007, at the age of 45 after years of failing health. He developed diabetes and had a foot amputated some years before he died. He is buried in Evergreen Cemetery in Winston-Salem, North Carolina.
