= Wildcats (film) =

1986 film by Michael Ritchie

- Theatrical release poster
- Directed by: Michael Ritchie
- Written by: Ezra Sacks
- Produced by: Anthea Sylbert
- Starring: Goldie Hawn; James Keach; Swoosie Kurtz
- Cinematography: Donald E. Thorin
- Edited by: Richard A. Harris
- Music by: James Newton Howard
- Production company: Hawn/Sylbert Movie Company
- Distributed by: Warner Bros.
- Release date: February 14, 1986
- Running time: 106 minutes
- Country: United States
- Language: English
- Box office: $26.2 million

Wildcats is a 1986 American sports comedy film directed by Michael Ritchie and starring Goldie Hawn, James Keach and Swoosie Kurtz. It is the film debut of Wesley Snipes and Woody Harrelson.

== Plot ==
Molly McGrath is the daughter of a famed football coach who is dying to head her own team. When her wish is finally granted, Molly leaves her job coaching girls' track at an affluent high school (Prescott High School) to take over a football team at an inner-city Chicago high school (Central High School)—the kind of place where guard dogs are needed to patrol the campus. At first the new coach's idealism and optimism are suffocated with racial and gender prejudice, but eventually her overriding spirit begins to whip her unruly team into shape. After noticing him at every practice and game, Molly hustles teenage criminal and former star football player Levander "Bird" Williams into rejoining the team which helps build rapport among the team. She also adds the massive and comedic Phillip Finch to the team. At the same time, she must also struggle to win a battle for the custody of her two young daughters Alice and Marian. The real test for Molly comes when her Central High team faces Prescott in the city championship.

== Cast ==
- Goldie Hawn as Molly McGrath
- James Keach as Frank Needham
- Swoosie Kurtz as Verna McGrath
- Robyn Lively as Alice Needham
- Brandy Gold as Marian Needham
- Nipsey Russell as Principal Ben Edwards
- Bruce McGill as Dan Darwell
- M. Emmet Walsh as Walt Coes
- Mykelti Williamson as Levander "Bird" Williams
- Tab Thacker as Phillip Finch
- Wesley Snipes as Trumaine
- Nick Corri as Cerulo
- Woody Harrelson as Krushinski
- Willie J. Walton as Marvel
- Rodney Hill as Peanut
- George Wyner as Principal Walker
- Bruce French as Mayhew
- Jan Hooks as Stephanie Needham
- LL Cool J as Rapper
- Ann Doran as Mrs. Chatham
- Gloria Stuart as Mrs. Connoly

== Production ==
=== Filming ===
The film used Lane Technical College Prep High School football stadium for some of their shots.

== Reception ==
=== Box office ===
The film debuted at No. 4.

=== Critical response ===
The film holds a score of 30% on Rotten Tomatoes based on 20 reviews.

Roger Ebert gave the film 1.5 stars out of 4 and wrote, "The filmmakers, the producers and Hawn herself bought the premise instead of looking for the plot. The problem with the movie is that they started with a character description instead of with a story. The fact that Hawn plays a boys' football coach is not in itself interesting. Her relationship with the team would have been interesting, if they'd developed one." Gene Siskel of the Chicago Tribune awarded 1 star out of 4 and called it a "pathetic sports comedy" that represented "another attempt to duplicate the success of Hawn's genuinely funny, monster hit, Private Benjamin." Janet Maslin of The New York Times wrote of Hawn that "[t]he film isn't truly a waste of her talents, but neither does it give her a chance to do much more than repeat some familiar tricks."

Variety wrote that Hawn had by now been "reduced to a type" of "the adorable but goofy independent woman," but she "is the least of the problems amid cardboard characters with cardboard conflicts ... Football footage is also surprisingly dull, filmed mostly at close range making it look more like bodies bouncing off each other than a sport." Patrick Goldstein of the Los Angeles Times called it "a good-natured but superficial comedy—sort of a Bad News Bears Goes to the Ghetto ... The movie is such a well-oiled dream machine that it would have been nice if the story, for all its corny charm, had veered off in a more adventuresome or unpredictable direction." Roger Piantadosi of The Washington Post called it "a slick, fitfully charming little comedy that does nothing to deter those of us bent on being fond of Goldie Hawn forever. However, she is pushing her luck."

In 2014, the movie was mentioned by Keli Goff in The Daily Beast in an article concerning white savior narratives in film.

== See also ==
- List of American football films
