= Doug Schwab =

American wrestler (born 1977)

Personal information
- Born: August 3, 1977 (age 49) Osage, Iowa, U.S.
- Height: 5 ft 5 in (165 cm)
- Weight: 66 kg (146 lb)

Sport
- Country: United States
- Sport: Wrestling
- Events: Freestyle and Folkstyle
- College team: Iowa
- Club: Hawkeye Wrestling Club; Gator Wrestling Club
- Team: USA
- Coached by: Jim Zalesky
Medal record
Representing the United States
Men's freestyle wrestling
Pan American Games
Bronze medal – third place	2007 Rio de Janeiro	66 kg
Pan American Championships
Gold medal – first place	2006 Rio de Janeiro	66 kg
Collegiate Wrestling
Representing the Iowa Hawkeyes
NCAA Division I Championships
Gold medal – first place	1999 State College	141 lb
Silver medal – second place	2001 Iowa City	141 lb
Bronze medal – third place	2000 St. Louis	141 lb
Big Ten Championships
Gold medal – first place	1999 Ann Arbor	141 lb
Gold medal – first place	2000 Iowa City	141 lb
Gold medal – first place	2001 Evanston	141 lb

Doug Schwab (born August 3, 1977) is an American former freestyle and folkstyle wrestler. He is the current head wrestling coach at the University of Northern Iowa. He participated in men's freestyle 66 kg at 2008 Summer Olympics.

He wrestled at the University of Iowa, where he was a three-time All-American and Big Ten Champion. He also won the 1999 NCAA championship at 141 pounds. He finished his collegiate career with 130 wins, which ranked 10th in school history as of 2012. As a high school wrestler at Osage High School, he was a three-time state finalist (missing the 1994 tournament due to injury). He won the 1996 2A state championship at 130 pounds.

Following his collegiate career, Schwab served as an assistant coach under Tom Brands at Virginia Tech during the 2005-2006 season. He returned to Iowa as a volunteer assistant coach in 2006-2007. He was promoted to full-time assistant for the Hawkeyes from 2007-2010. On August 1, 2010, Schwab was named the ninth head wrestling coach for the University of Northern Iowa.

In May 2014, Schwab inked a seven-year extension to remain the head wrestling coach of the Panthers. The extension came a few months after he led the wrestling squad to a perfect 13-0 dual season and crowned three All-Americans. Three All-Americans (Dylan Peters, Joe Colon, and Joey Lazor) was the most in program history since 2002.

In 2025, Schwab was named both NCAA Division I Men’s National Coach of the Year and Big 12 Coach of the Year following a 14-1 dual meet record and a ninth place team finish for UNI in the NCAA National Wrestling Championships, the highest finish for UNI in the D-I Championships since 1962. It marked UNI's most dual meet wins since 1990-91 and UNI crowned three Big 12 champions at the Big 12 Conference Championships, finishing second (UNI's best finish since joining the Big 12 for the 2017-18 season). Under Schwab, UNI qualified wrestlers at all ten weight classes for the 2025 NCAA National Wrestling Championships for the first time since 1986. Schwab previously won the Big 12 Coach of the Year honors in 2020.
