= 1985 NCAA Division I Wrestling Championships =

American collegiate wrestling tournament

Tournament information
- Sport: College wrestling
- Location: Oklahoma City, Oklahoma
- Dates: March 14, 1985–March 16, 1985
- Host(s): University of Oklahoma; Oklahoma State University
- Venue(s): Myriad Convention Center

Final positions
- Champions: Iowa (10th title)
- 1st runners-up: Oklahoma
- 2nd runners-up: Iowa State

Tournament statistics
- Attendance: 41,884
- MVP: Barry Davis (Iowa)

The 1985 NCAA Division I Wrestling Championships were the 55th NCAA Division I Wrestling Championships to be held. The University of Oklahoma and Oklahoma State University co-hosted the tournament in Oklahoma City at the Myriad Convention Center.

Iowa took home the team championship with 145.25 points and having two individual champions.

Barry Davis of Iowa was named the Most Outstanding Wrestler and Darryl Peterson of Iowa State received the Gorriaran Award.

== Team results ==
Rank	School	Points
1	Iowa	145.25
2	Oklahoma	98.5
3	Iowa State	70
4	Oklahoma State	56
5	Michigan	52
6	Arizona State	50.75
7	Penn State	46.75
8	Tennessee	32.5
9	Lehigh	31.5
10	Bloomsburg	31

== Individual finals ==
Weight class	Championship match (champion in boldface)
118 lbs	**Ricky Bonomo**, Bloomsburg MAJOR Matt Egeland, Iowa, 17–3
126 lbs	**Barry Davis**, Iowa DEC Joe McFarland, Michigan, 8–4
134 lbs	**Jim Jordan**, Wisconsin DEC John Smith, Oklahoma State, 7–4
142 lbs	**Joe Gibbons**, Iowa State DEC John Orr, Princeton, 4–3
150 lbs	**Eddie Urbano**, Arizona State DEC Jim Heffernan, Iowa, 4–1
158 lbs	**Marty Kistler**, Iowa DEC Greg Elinsky, Penn State, 4–3
167 lbs	**Chris Edmond**, Tennessee DEC Pete Capone, Hofstra, 14–10
177 lbs	**Melvin Douglas**, Oklahoma DEC Wayne Catan, Syracuse, 3–2
190 lbs	**Dan Chaid**, Oklahoma DEC Duane Goldman, Iowa, 5–3
UNL	**Bill Hyman**, Temple MAJOR Kirk Trost, Michigan, 12–2
