= Tony Ramos (wrestler) =

American freestyle wrestler (born 1991)

Personal information
- Full name: Anthony Tony Ramos
- Born: February 12, 1991 (age 35) Chicago, Illinois, U.S.
- Height: 5 ft 4 in (163 cm)
- Weight: 57 kg (126 lb)

Sport
- Country: United States
- Sport: Wrestling
- Events: Freestyle and Folkstyle
- College team: Iowa
- Club: Tar Heel Wrestling Club; Hawkeye Wrestling Club
- Team: USA
- Coached by: Coleman Scott, Tom Brands, Terry Brands
Medal record
Men's freestyle wrestling
Representing the United States
World Cup
Silver medal – second place	2015 Los Angeles	Team
Silver medal – second place	2017 Kermanshah	Team
Canada Cup
Gold medal – first place	2014 Guelph	57 kg
Grand Prix Paris
Gold medal – first place	2015 Paris	57 kg
Bronze medal – third place	2017 Paris	61 kg
Men's collegiate wrestling
Representing the Iowa Hawkeyes
NCAA Division I Championships
Gold medal – first place	2014 Oklahoma City	133 lb
Silver medal – second place	2013 Des Moines	133 lb
Bronze medal – third place	2012 St. Louis	133 lb
Big Ten Championships
Gold medal – first place	2014 Madison	133 lb
Silver medal – second place	2012 West Lafayette	133 lb
Silver medal – second place	2013 Champaign	133 lb
Bronze medal – third place	2011 Evanston	133 lb

Anthony Tony Ramos (born February 12, 1991) is an American former folkstyle and freestyle wrestler. He competed on the international circuit as a freestyle wrestler for the United States.

== Early life and education ==
Of Mexican descent, Ramos was born February 12, 1991, in Chicago, Illinois, to Alfonzo and Debra Ramos. Ramos started wrestling when he was 3 years old so he could wrestle on the same team as his brothers, Frankie and Vince, and they could all be on the same team for one year.

In 6th grade Ramos joined the Martinez Elite wrestling club which is where he met coach Izzy Martinez. Prior to 8th grade Ramos had been living in Johnsburg, Illinois, but his family moved back to Carol Stream, where he attended Glenbard North High School. Ramos was a three-time Illinois state champion at Glenbard North, winning his titles at 112 and 125 pounds. Ramos would set school records for most takedowns in a career and season, and best season record. He also placed 5th at Junior World Championships in freestyle wrestling.

After completing his storied high school career, Ramos committed to attend the University of Iowa under head coach Tom Brands. While at Iowa, Ramos competed at 133 pounds and was a three-time All-American.

On July 19, 2014, he married Megan (Eskew) Ramos, whom he met while at the University of Iowa. On April 25, 2015, the couple welcomed their son Anthony Joseph (AJ) Ramos Jr. into the world.

Ramos formerly trained as a member of the Hawkeye Wrestling Club in Iowa City. Ramos was also a member of the Titan Mercury Wrestling Club. In 2016, after defeating Coleman Scott at the US Olympic Team Trials, Ramos moved to Chapel Hill, North Carolina, to train with Scott and Olympic Champion Kenny Monday as a member of the Tar Heel Wrestling Club. He started a website named "Team Ramos", where Ramos provides updates on his life and career.

== College career ==
=== 2010–2011 ===
Ramos started his college career battling for the 133 spot in the Iowa lineup with senior Tyler Clark. Ramos went 6–0 at Carver-Hawkeye Arena, placed 6th at the Midlands championships and eventually won the starting spot. In his first trip to the NCAA tournament Ramos finished one win shy of All-American honors. Ramos also finished 3rd at the Big Ten conference tournament.

=== 2011–2012 ===
Coming back for his sophomore season Ramos saw much improvement as he finished 2nd at the Big Ten conference tournament, and earned his first All-American honors by placing 3rd at the NCAA championships. Ramos led the team in dual wins (17), dual winning percentage (.944), Big Ten duals (7), Big Ten dual winning percentage (.875), and technical falls (7). Big Ten Wrestler of the Week December 6, 2011, and January 10, 2012. He also posted a 9–0 record at Carver-Hawkeye Arena.

=== 2012–2013 ===
Ramos continued his upward trend as a junior again finishing 2nd at the Big Ten conference tournament and also 2nd the NCAA championships losing to four time NCAA champion Logan Stieber of Ohio State in the finals. Ramos led the team with 23 dual wins and was 8–0 in Big Ten conference duals. Earned Big Ten Wrestler of the Week for the third time in his career on February 5, 2013. Ramos finished the year 9–0 at Carver-Hawkeye Arena.

=== 2013–2014 ===
Ramos finished his senior year on top by winning both the Big Ten conference title and NCAA title at 133. He won both matches over Wisconsin's Tyler Graff. Ramos lost two matches on the year, the first to Joe Colon of the University of Northern Iowa at the Midlands championship finals, and to AJ Schopp of Edinboro. 10–0 at home, raising his career record to 34–0 all-time at Carver-Hawkeye Arena, the first wrestler to accomplish the feat since Brent Metcalf. Named Big Ten Wrestler of the Week on January 14, 2014. Ramos was also named University of Iowa male student-athlete of the year.

== International career ==
=== 2014 ===
Ramos originally planned to take a year off between college and International wrestling, but at his wife's suggestion he entered the World Team Trials in Madison, Wisconsin. After winning the challenge tournament over Nico Megaludis of Penn State, Ramos then wrestled Sam Hazewinkel in the finals.

Ramos won a best-of-three tournament 4–0 and 5–1 to claim the 57 kg spot for Team USA at the 2014 World Wrestling Championships in Tashkent, Uzbekistan.

Ramos won the Canada Cup on July 5, 2014.

In his first match at the 2014 World Championships, Ramos lost to Bekhbayar Erdenebat (Mongolia), 4–7.

In November Ramos picked up another win over Sam Hazewinkel in a match sponsored by the Global Wrestling Championship.

Ramos also competed in Iran in late November in the World Club Cups where he went 4-1 for Titan Mercury Wrestling Club.

=== 2015 ===
In his first tournament of the year, Ramos went 0–2 at the prestigious Golden Grand Prix Ivan Yarygin 2015. Ramos lost to eventual silver medalist Ismail Musukaev (tech. fall) and in second match Tony lost to Viktor Rassadin of Russia (4–8). The following weekend Ramos got back on track as he won gold in the 57 kg bracket at the Paris Grand Prix. Ramos also debuted in the World rankings at #19.

On April 3, 2015, Tony Ramos took on former Olympic Gold medalist Henry Cejudo at the AGON event: Iowa Against The World in Cedar Rapids, Iowa. There Ramos would rally from an 8–2 deficit to beat the former Olympic champion 12-8 and he won his second Global Wrestling Championship belt. Later that month Ramos competed in his first World Cup where he went 2–2. His two losses were to Yowlys Bonne of Cuba and former World champion Hassan Rahimi of Iran. USA took silver at the event. Ramos went on to win his first USA national title in Las Vegas on May 9, 2015, when he defeated Andrew Hochstrasser 7–3. The win earned him the right to automatically qualify for the 57 kg finals at the World Team Trials. Ramos had also moved to #13 in the World rankings.

=== 2016 ===
In 2016 Ramos was attempting to make his third straight World Team at 57 kg, but was defeated by former teammate Daniel Dennis in two straight matches at the US Olympic Team Trials in Iowa City, Iowa. It was the first ever loss for Ramos in Carver Hawkeye-Arena. Following his loss in the Olympic Trials Ramos decided to leave the Hawkeye Wrestling Club and become an assistant coach at the University of North Carolina and also became a member of the wrestling club affiliate, the Tar Heel Wrestling Club.

=== 2017 ===
After winning the U.S. Open at 57 kg in April Ramos earned a bye to the finals of the 2017 World Team Trials. It was there he met former Iowa teammate Thomas Gilman in the finals, where he lost in two straight matches.

He retired of the sport at the 2019 US World Team Trials Challenge tournament, after reaching the semifinals.

=== Post-retirement ===
Ramos will make his grappling debut on October 2, 2020, in a superfight against the experienced Nicky Ryan.
