= Jim Heffernan =

American wrestler and coach

Medal record

Collegiate Wrestling

Representing the Iowa Hawkeyes

NCAA Division I Championships
Gold medal – first place	1986 Iowa City	150 lb
Silver medal – second place	1985 Oklahoma City	150 lb
Silver medal – second place	1987 College Park	150 lb

Big Ten Championships
Gold medal – first place	1983 Iowa City	150 lb
Gold medal – first place	1985 Evanston	150 lb
Gold medal – first place	1986 Minneapolis	150 lb
Gold medal – first place	1987 Madison	150 lb

Jim Heffernan is a former NCAA wrestling champion and former wrestling coach at the University of Illinois.

== High school career ==
Heffernan was a two-time OHSAA state champion and three-time state placer at St. Edward High School in Lakewood, Ohio.

== College career ==
At the University of Iowa he was a national champion, a two-time national runner-up, and a four-time All-American. He won the NCAA national championship during his junior year.

== Coaching career ==
Heffernan spent 19 years as an assistant at the University of Illinois, 2 years at Oregon State University, and 2 years at Lehigh University. In 1995, 2001, and 2003 he was named national assistant coach of the year. In 2009, Heffernan became the head wrestling coach at the University of Illinois.

== Accolades ==
- 1987 University of Iowa Male Athlete of The Year
- 2006 National Wrestling Hall of Fame Glen Brand Inductee
- 2015 University of Iowa Hall of Fame
