= Melvin Douglas (wrestler) =

American freestyle wrestler (born 1963)

Personal information
- Full name: Melvin L. Douglas III
- Born: August 21, 1963 (age 62) Topeka, Kansas, U.S.

Sport
- Country: United States
- Sport: Wrestling
- Events: Freestyle and Folkstyle
- College team: Oklahoma
- Club: Sunkist Kids Wrestling Club
- Team: USA
Medal record
Men's freestyle wrestling
Representing the United States
World Championships
Gold medal – first place	1993 Toronto	90 kg
Silver medal – second place	1989 Martigny	82 kg
Bronze medal – third place	1994 Istanbul	90 kg
Bronze medal – third place	1995 Atlanta	90 kg
Pan American Games
Gold medal – first place	1995 Mar del Plata	90 kg
Collegiate Wrestling
Representing the Oklahoma Sooners
NCAA Division I Championships
Gold medal – first place	1985 Oklahoma City	177 lb
Gold medal – first place	1986 Iowa City	177 lb

Melvin L. Douglas III (born August 21, 1963) of Topeka, Kansas is an American wrestler who was the 1993 World Champion, and made six World championship teams for the United States, including appearances at two Olympic games, and was a two-time NCAA Division I Champion for the University of Oklahoma. In 2013, Douglas was inducted into the National Wrestling Hall of Fame as a Distinguished Member.

== High school ==
In 1979, 1980 and 1981, Douglas won the Kansas state championship at Highland Park High School in Topeka, Kansas. Douglas was also a USA Junior Freestyle national champion in 1981, after his senior season of high school.

== College ==
While at The University of Oklahoma, Douglas was a four-time All-American and won the NCAA championship in 1985 and 1986 at 177 pounds.

== International ==
Douglas represented the United States in the FILA World Championships six times, and won the 1993 world championship at 90 kg. Douglas won silver in 1989 and third in 1994 and '95. Douglas competed in the 1996 Olympic Games in Atlanta where he placed seventh (with a 3–2 record) at 90 kg. He also qualified for the 2000 Games in Sydney, Australia at 97 kg, finishing in 18th place.
