= Jason Welch =

American amateur wrestler (born 1989)

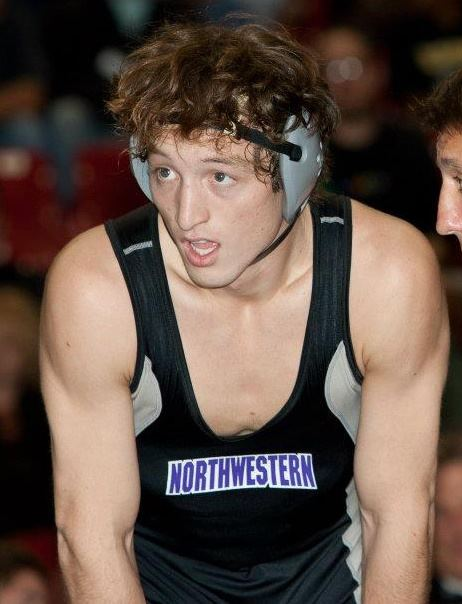
- Welch in 2012
- Weight: 157 lb (71 kg)
- Born: November 2, 1989 (age 36); Walnut Creek, California, U.S.
- High school: Las Lomas (CA)
- State championships: 3 (California)
- College: Northwestern University
- Status: Graduated

Medal record

Men's collegiate wrestling

Representing the Northwestern Wildcats

NCAA Division I Championships
Silver medal – second place	2013 Des Moines	157 lb

Big Ten Championships
Gold medal – first place	2013 Champaign	157 lb
Silver medal – second place	2009 State College	157 lb
Silver medal – second place	2012 Columbus	157 lb
Bronze medal – third place	2011 Evanston	157 lb

Jason Michael Welch (born November 2, 1989) is an American former wrestler and current coach. As a high school wrestler at Las Lomas High School in Walnut Creek, California, Welch was the 13th wrestler ever to win three California state championships. In 2008, Welch graduated and signed with Northwestern University in Evanston, Illinois. Welch was a four-time national qualifier and a three-time NCAA All-American.

== Wrestling career ==
=== High school ===
Welch attended Las Lomas High School from 2004 to 2008. While at Las Lomas, he lettered in varsity soccer, football, and wrestling. On his way to winning three state championships, Welch recorded 119 consecutive victories and ended his high school career with a 194-7 win-loss record. He was named the Junior Hodge Trophy winner for 2008. According to Intermatwrestle.com, Welch was the top ranked high school wrestler when he signed to Northwestern University.

=== College ===
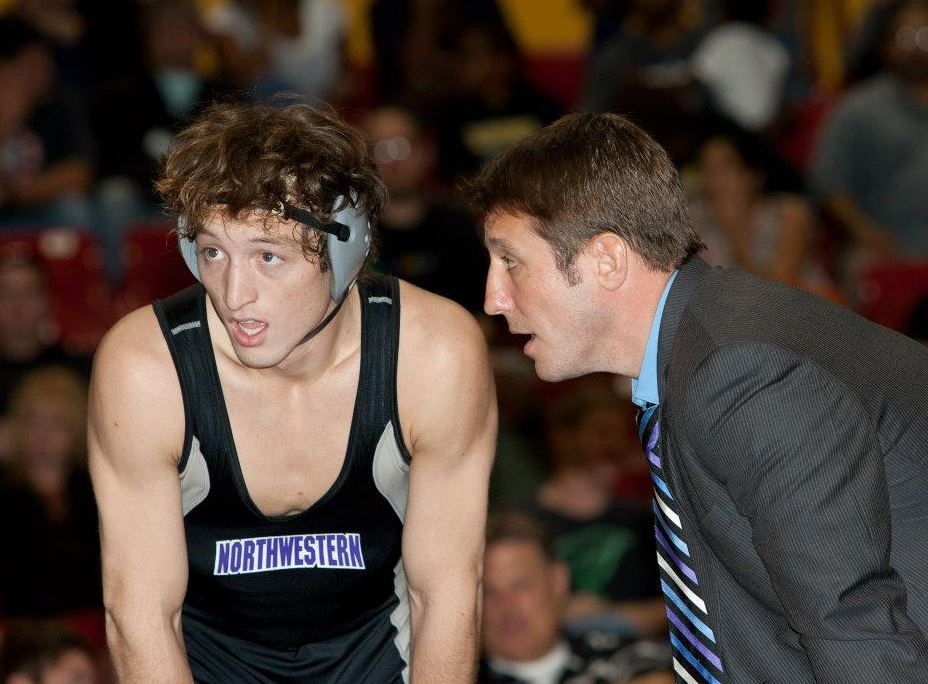
Welch and Northwestern University head coach Drew Pariano during match in 2012

Entering Northwestern in 2008, Welch started for the Northwestern Wildcats as a true freshman. As a true freshman, he qualified for the NCAA wrestling national tournament. As a redshirt sophomore, Welch qualified for the NCAA tournament again and placed 6th after losing to Bubba Jenkins of Arizona State in the semi-finals to earn All-American honors. In 2011, during Welch's redshirt junior season, he was invited to wrestle at the 46th NWCA All-Star Classic where he beat Ganbayar Sanjaa of American University. Welch placed 4th for All-American honors his redshirt junior year. Welch won the famed 49th Midlands tournament hosted by his home school Northwestern, and led Northwestern to its highest team place at the tournament with the Wildcats placing 2nd overall behind Iowa. In 2013, Welch won a Big Ten championship and placed 2nd at the NCAA championships, making him a 3-time NCAA All-American.

== Honors ==
In 2023, Welch was inducted into the California Wrestling Hall of Fame.

== Personal life ==
Welch was born in Walnut Creek, California to John and Barbara Welch. He graduated as an English Major at Northwestern University. Welch coached wrestling at Loyola Academy and now serves as head coach at San Francisco State University.
