= Jim Zalesky =

American wrestler and coach (born 1961)

Personal information
- Born: January 15, 1961 (age 65) Cedar Rapids, Iowa, U.S.

Sport
- Sport: Wrestling
- Events: Freestyle and Folkstlye
- College team: Iowa
- Coached by: Dan Gable
Medal record
Collegiate Wrestling
Representing the Iowa Hawkeyes
NCAA Division I Championships
Gold medal – first place	1982 Ames	158 lb
Gold medal – first place	1983 Oklahoma City	158 lb
Gold medal – first place	1984 East Rutherford	158 lb
Big Ten Championships
Gold medal – first place	1982 Ann Arbor	158 lb
Gold medal – first place	1983 Iowa City	158 lb
Gold medal – first place	1984 East Lansing	158 lb
Silver medal – second place	1981 Madison	158 lb

James (Jim) Zalesky (born January 15, 1961) is an American college wrestling coach and is currently an assistant coach at Cal Poly Humboldt. Previous, he was the head coach at the University of Jamestown. He was the former head wrestling coach for the Oregon State Beavers. Prior to joining the Beavers, he was the coach of the University of Iowa wrestling team from 1998 to 2006. At Iowa, he succeeded Dan Gable as head coach, under whom he was a three-time NCAA champion. As head coach for Iowa, he guided the Hawkeyes to three NCAA team championships in 1998, 1999, and 2000. In 2004, he was inducted into the National Wrestling Hall of Fame as a Distinguished Member.

== Career ==
=== Wrestling ===
Zalesky was a four-time All-American at Iowa from 1981 to 1984. He won the NCAA individual title in the 158 pound weight class in 1982, 1983, and 1984. He went undefeated his last two years, ending his college career with an 89 match winning streak. At the 1984 NCAA Championships, he was named the Most Outstanding Wrestler. Amateur Wrestling News named him "Wrestler of the Decade" for the 1980s. His competitive college career occurred during the streak of which the University of Iowa wrestling team won seven consecutive national titles.

He narrowly missed making the 1984 Olympic wrestling team, finishing second in the 163 pound weight class at the US Olympic trials.

Zalesky was inducted into the National Wrestling Hall of Fame as a Distinguished Member in 2004.

=== Coaching ===
Despite coaching the Hawkeyes to three NCAA team championships in nine years, with a runner-up finish in 2004 and a 4th place finish in 2006, Zalesky was fired as Iowa's head coach on March 30, 2006. Athletic Director Bob Bowlsby cited a decline in the program under Zalesky and the need for a change as the reasons.

Oregon State's prior head coach, Joe Wells, retired a few days later leaving the program on a high note ending with a 13–2–1 record for the 2005–06 season. Zalesky was announced as Oregon State's new head coach on April 14, 2006. Under Zalesky, the Beavers won seven Pac-12 team titles from 2006 to 2020. The Beavers were 147-75-2 in dual meets during Zalesky's tenure. On March 9, 2020, Zalesky was dismissed as head coach by Oregon State University.

On May 4, 2021 the University of Jamestown in North Dakota hired Zalesky as the new men's wrestling coach.

Zalesky overall coaching record is 274-109-2, with him having coached over 50 All-Americans.
