= Brent Metcalf =

American wrestler and coach (born 1986)

Personal information
- Born: July 20, 1986 (age 40) Flint, Michigan, U.S.

Sport
- Country: United States
- Sport: Wrestling
- Weight class: 143.3 lb (65 kg)
- Events: Freestyle and Folkstyle
- College team: Iowa
- Club: Hawkeye Wrestling Club
- Team: USA
- Coached by: Tom Brands and Terry Brands
Medal record
Men's freestyle wrestling
Representing the United States
Pan American Games
Gold medal – first place	2015 Toronto	65 kg
Pan American Championships
Bronze medal – third place	2009 Maracaibo	66 kg
Golden Grand Prix Ivan Yarygin
Silver medal – second place	2013 Krasnoyarsk	65 kg
Silver medal – second place	2015 Krasnoyarsk	65 kg
Bronze medal – third place	2011 Krasnoyarsk	66 kg
Golden Grand Prix Heydar Aliyev
Gold medal – first place	2014 Baku	65 kg
Bronze medal – third place	2010 Baku	66 kg
Paris Grand Prix
Bronze medal – third place	2015 Paris	65 kg
Men's collegiate wrestling
Representing the Iowa Hawkeyes
NCAA Division I Championships
Gold medal – first place	2008 St. Louis	149 lb
Gold medal – first place	2010 Omaha	149 lb
Silver medal – second place	2009 St. Louis	149 lb
Big Ten Championships
Gold medal – first place	2008 Minneapolis	149 lb
Gold medal – first place	2009 State College	149 lb
Silver medal – second place	2010 Ann Arbor	149 lb

Brent Metcalf (born July 14, 1986) is an American former freestyle and folkstyle wrestler. Metcalf was a four-time member of the US World Team in freestyle wrestling and two-time NCAA wrestling champion at the University of Iowa.

== Biography ==
As a prep wrestler, Metcalf went undefeated with a career record of 228–0, won four consecutive Michigan state titles, and earned six junior national titles. After originally committing to Virginia Tech, Metcalf would ultimately transfer to the University of Iowa following his redshirt year, to follow coach Tom Brands, who was switching head coaching positions from Virginia Tech to the University of Iowa also. Due to Virginia Tech's desire not to release him, Metcalf was forced to sit out the entire 2006–2007 season. In the fall of 2007, as sophomore, Metcalf finally began his collegiate wrestling career. During the course of his first competitive season, he captured the Big Ten and National Championships at 149 lbs.

Metcalf joined Cael Sanderson and David Taylor as the only sophomores to win the Dan Hodge Trophy as the best collegiate wrestler. He was also named the Jesse Owens Big Ten Male Athlete of the Year, beating out athletes in more high-profile sports like football and basketball. Metcalf was additionally named Outstanding Wrestler of the Big Ten and NCAA Tournaments, and honored as Big Ten Wrestler of the Year.

== Personal ==
Raised in Davison, Michigan, Brent Metcalf is the son of Tom and Lynn Metcalf. His mother was an All-State gymnast and State Champion in track and field. He was high school teammates with 3x All-American and 1x National Champion Paul Donahoe and 3x All-American and 1x National Champion Jon Reader, all coached under Roy Hall. His older brother, Chase Metcalf, was also a very successful wrestler, but lost his life in a car accident in his university years. Roy Hall's son Chase Langdon Hall was named after Brent Metcalf's brother Chase Metcalf. Metcalf married Iowa City native Kristin Metcalf (née Knipper). Metcalf graduated from the University of Iowa with a bachelor's degree in sociology.

== High school ==
Metcalf finished his prep career with a 228–0 career record, tallying 156 pins. A four-time state champion, Metcalf also led his team to four consecutive state team titles. As a senior, he was named Michigan's "Mr. Wrestler" in 2005, was selected as second-team ASICS All-American (behind rival Dustin Schlatter), Wrestling USA All-American and a Wrestling USA scholastic All-American.

A two-time FILA Junior national champion, Metcalf captured the Most Outstanding Wrestler award in 2004 and was named the Outstanding Wrestler at 2005 Junior freestyle nationals. He defeated Pennsylvania wrestler Matt Dragon in the finals. He also wrestled Dragon in the Dapper Dan, beating him in an 8–7 win. A six-time Junior national champion, he was also three-time Junior Greco-Roman and freestyle national champion, en route to earning double Most Outstanding Wrestler awards in 2005. He completed his senior season as a 2005 Dave Schultz High School Excellence regional award winner. Metcalf was also a Cadet Greco-Roman national champion and freestyle runner-up.

== College ==
=== 2005–2006 ===
After committing to coach Tom Brands at Virginia Tech, Metcalf used the 2005–2006 season as his redshirt year.

=== 2006–2007 ===
On April 9, 2006, past NCAA champion and former Iowa Hawkeye Tom Brands was named the head coach of the Iowa wrestling program. Shortly after Brands accepted Iowa's offer, the five Virginia Tech wrestlers requested to transfer to Iowa pursuant to the NCAA's "one-time transfer exception." Virginia Tech chose not to grant their release, and despite their issuing a lawsuit against Virginia Tech, the wrestlers were unable to successfully transfer without losing one year of eligibility.

During this season of lost eligibility, Metcalf competed in both folkstyle and freestyle competitions. He competed unattached in three open college tournaments, winning all three en route to compiling a 14–0 record at 149 pounds. He won Omaha's Kaufman-Brand Open, an event that included a number of top Division I teams.

=== 2007–2008 ===
Metcalf entered the 2008 NCAA Wrestling Championships as the top-seeded wrestler in the 149-pound weight class. He had only one loss on the year, getting pinned in a spladle in the first period by NC State wrestler Darrion Caldwell during their dual meet. He opened his tournament in dominant style with a first-period fall on Will Rowe of Oklahoma, his only pin of the tournament, and won the 2008 NCAA wrestling championship by defeating Bubba Jenkins, future 2011 NCAA champion from Arizona State, 14–8. He gave up the first two takedowns in the first period before coming back for the victory. He defeated future world champion and Olympic gold medalist Jordan Burroughs of Nebraska in the semifinals, 6–3. He also defeated returning All American Lance Palmer of Ohio State in the quarterfinals. For his efforts he was named the tournament's most outstanding wrestler. For his achievements, Metcalf was named the winner of the 2008 Dan Hodge Trophy, awarded annually to the nation's best college wrestler.

=== 2008–2009 ===
Metcalf entered the 2009 NCAA Wrestling Championships with an unblemished 37–0 record and again garnered the number-one seed for the 149-pound weight class. He lost in the finals to Darrion Caldwell of NC State 11–6. As time expired in the match, Caldwell went to do a celebratory backflip and Metcalf pushed him in mid-air causing Caldwell to land dangerously on his back. The NCAA Wrestling Committee reprimanded Metcalf, issuing a news release that it "strongly believes the championships should not be tarnished by such acts."

=== 2009–2010 ===
Metcalf went undefeated during the regular season at 149-pounds. Metcalf then lost to Lance Palmer from Ohio State in the Big 10 Championships when Metcalf, down by one considering riding time, failed to finish a deep single and was put to his back late in the third period after a wild scramble. Palmer, a fellow four-time high-school state champion, had met and lost to Metcalf in four prior matches. Metcalf would avenge the loss by defeating Palmer 3–2 to capture his second NCAA championship. Metcalf finished his collegiate career with a record of 108-3 (.973).

== International career ==
=== 2013–2014 ===
In 2013 on Golden Grand Prix "Ivan Yarygin" in Krasnoyarsk became runner-up. He lost in final wrestler from Russia Ilyas Bekbulatov (8-0,7-1).

In 2014 at the Wrestling World Cup in Los Angeles, Metcalf helped the USA secure 3rd place, while becoming the World Cup champion at 65 kg.

In 25–27 July on the "Golden Grand-Prix Heydar Aliyev" Metcalf became winner in 65 kg.

In 2014 World Wrestling Championships Metcalf lost in 1/16 finals to Mustafa Kaya of Turkey (7-4).

=== 2014–2015 ===
On December 21, Metcalf competed in the Flo Premier League (FPL), where he faced Franklin Gomez (Puerto Rico) in a freestyle-folkstyle hybrid match. Metcalf won his match 9–2 over Gomez in a matchup of two of the top 20 freestyle wrestlers in the world.

In January 2015, it was announced that Metcalf would face 18-year-old phenom Aaron Pico in an Agon Wrestling Championship match. Metcalf and Pico were billed as the main event and Metcalf won the match by a score of 4-1 scoring the match's only takedown.

On January 24, 2015, Metcalf faced Ilyas Bekbulatov of Russia in the 65 kg final at Golden Grand Prix Ivan Yarygin 2015 in Russia. Bekbulatov won 8–6, and Metcalf earned the silver medal for Team USA. Metcalf was the first American this decade to make the Yarygin finals twice. On the same overseas trip, Metcalf later took bronze at the Paris Grand Prix at 65 kg.

For the second straight year, Metcalf went 4-0 and won the World Cup at 65 kilograms, picking up two wins against World medalists along the way. He defeated Ganzorigiin Mandakhnaran of Mongolia 8-2 and Masoud Esmaeilpour 3–1. His four victories helped Team USA secure the Team Silver Medal.

== Coaching career ==
In April 2017, Brent Metcalf accepted a position as Volunteer Assistant Coach for Iowa State University's wrestling team. The following year in 2018, he became a full time assistant coach for the Cyclones. Prior to Iowa State, Metcalf had brief stints as Assistant Coach for Cedar Rapids Prairie High School wrestling from August through November 2016, and as the National Freestyle Developmental Coach for USA Wrestling from November 2016 until April 2017. Metcalf was named as the head coach for the Iowa State Cyclones (men's) wrestling team on April 16, 2026.
