= Barry Davis (wrestler) =

American freestyle wrestler (born 1961)

Personal information
- Full name: Barry Alan Davis
- Born: September 17, 1961 (age 64) Bloomfield, Iowa, U.S.
- Height: 5 ft 1 in (155 cm)
- Weight: 126 lb (57 kg)

Sport
- Country: United States
- Sport: Wrestling
- Events: Freestyle; Folkstyle
- College team: Iowa
- Club: Hawkeye Wrestling Club
- Team: USA
- Coached by: Dan Gable
Medal record
Men's freestyle wrestling
Representing the United States
Olympic Games
Silver medal – second place	1984 Los Angeles	57 kg
World Championships
Silver medal – second place	1987 Clermont-Ferrand	57 kg
Bronze medal – third place	1986 Budapest	57 kg
Pan American Games
Gold medal – first place	1983 Caracas	57 kg
Collegiate Wrestling
Representing the Iowa Hawkeyes
NCAA Division I Championships
Gold medal – first place	1982 Ames	118 lb
Gold medal – first place	1983 Oklahoma City	126 lb
Gold medal – first place	1985 Oklahoma City	126 lb
Big Ten Championships
Gold medal – first place	1981 Madison	118 lb
Gold medal – first place	1982 Ann Arbor	118 lb
Gold medal – first place	1983 Iowa City	126 lb
Gold medal – first place	1985 Evanston	126 lb

Barry Alan Davis (born September 17, 1961) is an Olympic silver medalist, a World bronze and silver medalist, and a Pan American Games gold medalist in freestyle wrestling. From 1994 until 2018, he served as head wrestling coach at the University of Wisconsin.

== Early life ==
Davis was born in Bloomfield, Iowa to Elmer and Carol Davis, and grew up in Cedar Rapids, Iowa. He credits the support and work ethic of his parents as contributing to his drive to succeed in athletics. Davis attended Cedar Rapids Prairie High School, where he was a three-time Iowa wrestling state champion and earned a career prep record of 102-6-1.

== College career ==
At the University of Iowa, Davis wrestled on coach Dan Gable's team. During his college career, Davis was a four time NCAA Division I All-American, and a three-time NCAA Division I National Champion . He was named NCAA Outstanding Wrestler in 1985, and was also named the Big Ten Athlete of the Year that same year. Barry Davis' career record at Iowa was 162-9-1. As of 2020, he continues to hold University of Iowa records for season victories (46 in 1982), and career victories (162).

== International competition ==
Davis was champion in freestyle wrestling (125.4 lb) at the 1983 Pan American Games, and a member of the 1983 U.S. World wrestling team. In 1984, he took a redshirt year from college athletics, to compete on the 1984 U.S. Olympic freestyle wrestling team, winning a silver medal at the Summer Olympics in Los Angeles. Davis competed in the World championships again in 1986 and 1987, earning a bronze medal and a silver, respectively. In 1988 he was once more a member of the U.S. Olympic freestyle wrestling team, but did not earn a medal.

== Coaching career ==
Barry Davis served as graduate assistant coach at the University of Iowa from 1986–1987, and was an assistant coach from 1988–1992. In 1992, he attempted a to make his third U.S. Olympic team, but did not achieve a place on the team. Davis had been head wrestling coach at the University of Wisconsin since 1994. On March 5, 2018, Davis announced that he would resign as head coach of the Wisconsin Badgers at the end of the 2017-18 season.

Davis married Nan Doak in 1986. Nan also attended University of Iowa where she was a six-time All-American in track and field and cross country prior to becoming a United States national champion in the marathon.

== Athletic achievements ==
- Three time Iowa state high school champion in wrestling
- 1982 NCAA Division I Champion, 118 lb class
- Two-time NCAA Division I Champion, 126 lb class (1983, 1985)
- 1983 Pan American Games champion, freestyle, 125.4 lb
- 1983 Member of U.S. World wrestling team
- Four-time NCAA Division I All-American
- 1984 Olympic silver medalist, 125.5 lb
- 1985 Big Ten Athlete of the Year
- 1985 NCAA Championships Outstanding Wrestler
- 1986 World championship bronze medalist, 125.4 lb
- 1987 World championship silver medalist, 125.4 lb
- 1988 Member of U.S. Olympic freestyle wrestling team

== Recognition ==
- Davis is a member of the National Iowa Varsity Club's Athletic Hall of Fame, inducted in 1998.
- In 2007, Davis was inducted into the National Wrestling Hall of Fame as a Distinguished Member.

== See also ==
- Iowa Hawkeyes wrestling

== Sources ==
- Pilcher, K. J. (December 28, 2007), "The Gazette's Top 40 – Our Greatest Athletes: Barry Davis", The Gazette
- Evans, Hilary; Gjerde, Arild; Heijmans, Jeroen; Mallon, Bill; et al. "Barry Davis". Olympics at Sports-Reference.com. Sports Reference LLC. Archived from the original on September 12, 2015.
