= Iowa Hawkeyes wrestling =

Wrestling team of the University of Iowa

Iowa Hawkeyes
- University: University of Iowa
- Head coach: Tom Brands (18th season)
- Conference: Big Ten
- Location: Iowa City, IA
- Arena: Carver–Hawkeye Arena (capacity: 15,500)
- Nickname: Hawkeyes
- Colors: Black and gold

Team national championships
- 24

National championship years
- 1975, 1976, 1978, 1979, 1980, 1981, 1982, 1983, 1984, 1985, 1986, 1991, 1992, 1993, 1995, 1996, 1997, 1998, 1999, 2000, 2008, 2009, 2010, 2021

NCAA individual champions
- 86

All-Americans
- 372

Conference Tournament championships
- Big Ten: 1915, 1916, 1958, 1962, 1974, 1975, 1976, 1977, 1978, 1979, 1980, 1981, 1982 ,1983, 1984, 1985, 1986, 1987, 1988, 1989, 1990, 1991, 1992, 1993, 1994, 1995, 1996, 1997, 1998, 2000, 2004, 2008, 2009, 2010, 2015, 2020, 2021

The University of Iowa men's wrestling program is one of the most successful NCAA Division I athletic programs. The Hawkeyes are 37 time Big Ten Conference champions and second in NCAA history with 24 National Championships.

== History ==
Wrestling at the University of Iowa began in 1911 when the first head coach, E.G. Schroeder, led the team in a dual against Nebraska. The Hawkeyes competed in the first Big Ten meet in 1926 under the direction of coach Mike Howard. Howard coached Iowa from 1921 until 1952. David McCuskey took over for Howard and coached the team until 1972 when Gary Kurdelmeier began a four season reign where his teams had an impressive 51-7-5 record. Kurdelmeier led the Hawkeyes to their first national championship in his third year as coach.

Former Iowa State University wrestler and assistant coach Dan Gable, became The University of Iowa head coach in 1976. He was the Hawkeyes head coach for 15 NCAA Championships and 21 consecutive Big Ten Championships. That included a streak of nine consecutive NCAA Team Championships, starting in 1978 and ending in 1986. It equaled the longest streak of national titles won by any school, in any sport, also held by the Yale golf team (1905–13) and the Southern Cal track team (1935–43). In 1994 the University of North Carolina Women's Soccer team became the most recent addition to this group by winning its ninth straight NCAA championship which was also its 12th of a possible 13 (92%) since 1982 when the NCAA replaced the AIAW in awarding National Champion titles in collegiate Women's Soccer. The Hawkeyes also set NCAA records for total points (158), victory margin (73.25) and number of national champions (5), and tied the record for most finalists (6) in 1986.

Gable was so confident that his team would win their tenth straight championships that he had the Roman Numeral "X" put on their warm-up jackets to signify the tenth championships they thought they would win. However, they would finish as the runner-up at the 1987 NCAA Championships behind the Iowa State Cyclones, Gable's alma mater.

Gable retired after the 1997 season in which the team broke its own NCAA record for total points with its winning total of 170, and recorded the second-largest victory margin (56.50 points) in NCAA tournament history. The Hawkeyes also crowned five NCAA Champions out of six finalists, both tying NCAA records. Gable finished his Iowa head coaching career with a record of 355-21-5 (.940), 21 consecutive Big Ten Titles, and 15 NCAA Championships.

During Gable's reign, Iowa had numerous remarkable seasons.

- Iowa had 9 All-American wrestlers in 1981, 1983, 1985, 1991, 1992, and 1995.
- Iowa had 9 Big Ten champions in 1983.
- Iowa had 5 national champions in 1986 and 1997.
- Iowa beat Oklahoma State by at least 25 points in five separate dual meets, including a meet on Feb. 9, 1991 at which the Cowboys didn’t win a single match. Only a tied match by All-American Randy Couture prevented the shutout. Iowa won the meet 35-2.

He was replaced by Jim Zalesky, who had wrestled for Gable in the early eighties and had been his top assistant at Iowa for several years. Zalesky picked up right where Gable left off by winning the 1998 Big Ten and National championships. The following season, the Hawkeyes saw their 25-year Big Ten championship streak snapped by the Minnesota Golden Gophers. Nevertheless, Iowa was able to recover and defend their national championship. In 2000, Zalesky's Hawkeyes returned to Big Ten championship form and also won their sixth consecutive national title and their third under Zalesky. However, the program would find itself struggling over the next six years, with Iowa winning only one Big Ten title in 2004 and no national championships. The Zalesky era came to an end after the 2005–06 campaign, a season which found the Hawkeyes slipping to fourth place in the final Big Ten tournament standings.

Iowa hired Tom Brands, another former Hawkeye wrestler who had also served as an assistant to Gable. Brands had been head coach at Virginia Tech prior to his return to Iowa City. In Iowa's first season under Brands, they would finish third in the Big Ten championships and eighth at the NCAA championships. The Hawkeyes rapidly returned to the national spotlight during the 2007–08 season, winning their first Big Ten championship in four years and their first NCAA championship in eight years and 21st national title overall. Brent Metcalf and Mark Perry finished as National Champions and finalist Joey Slaton was a runner-up. They repeated as 2009 NCAA champions, despite having no individual champions, with five All-Americans. Brent Metcalf was a finalist and finished second. Ryan Morningstar finished third. Phil Keddy and Dan Erekson finished fourth. Dan Dennis finished seventh. Iowa returned to the NCAA championships with a dominant performance in 2010, having already locked up the team title before the end of the second day of competition. They finished with 3 individual champions, 2 runners-up, and eight overall All-Americans. Matt McDonough won a National Championship as a freshman, while Brent Metcalf and Jay Borschel concluded their senior campaigns with National Championships. Dan Dennis finished second to Jayson Ness, of Minnesota, after losing the lead in the closing seconds of the match. Montell Marion, also, finished second, losing to freshman, and future four-time National Champ, Kyle Dake. Ryan Morningstar and Dan Erekson finished the season in seventh place, and Phil Keddy finished eighth.

Iowa's 2010 team was one of the most dominant in NCAA history. The team won all of its dual meets. Iowa shut out their opponents in eight of those duals, including Big Ten opponents Michigan, 36-0, Michigan State, 37-0, and Northwestern, 49-0. They also defeated Penn State, 29-6, Minnesota, 28-9, and Ohio State, 32-3. This success continued into 2011 until the Hawkeyes' 69-match winning streak ended with a 15-15 tie v. rival Oklahoma State in Stillwater. They continued this new "unbeaten streak" into 2012 finally ending in a 16-17 loss to Oklahoma State at home—ending a run of 84-0-1 going back to 2008. Unfortunately as of late, the Hawkeyes have been dominated by rival Penn State, having only won three duals in the last ten, even dropping the last three in a row to the Nittany Lions.

== Current roster 2025–2026 ==
Weight (Pounds)	Name	Year	Rank
125 lbs.	Dean Peterson	Sr.	7/7/7
133 lbs.	Drake Ayala	Sr.	8/9/9
141 lbs.	Nasir Bailey	Jr.	11/13/13
149 lbs.	Ryder Block	So.	15/14/17
157 lbs.	Jordan Williams	Jr.	NA/16/15
165 lbs.	Michael Caliendo	Sr.	3/3/3
174 lbs.	Patrick Kennedy	Sr.	3/3/3
184 lbs.	Angelo Ferrari	RS Fr.	NA/2/2
197 lbs.	Brody Sampson	RS Fr.	
285 lbs.	Ben Kueter	RS So.	10/9/8

== Home meets ==
Home meets are held in the 15,500 seat Carver–Hawkeye Arena in Iowa City. Several home matches each year are televised by Iowa Public Television or the Big Ten Network.

On Dec 6, 2008, Iowa set the national dual-meet attendance record for wrestling with a crowd of 15,955 against Iowa State University. It was a matchup of the #1 and #2 ranked schools in the country, which Iowa won 20–15.

On November 14, 2015, #4 Iowa reset the national collegiate wrestling dual-meet attendance record at Kinnick Stadium with over 42,000 fans in a victory over #1 Oklahoma State. Years of planning went into the event and it was named Grapple on the Gridiron. Tom Brands came up with the idea in 2008, and broke the previous record set by Big Ten Conference rival Penn State in 2013.

Iowa continually has the best attendance per season. Since 2002, when attendance began being compiled, Iowa has led average home attendance nationally 19 out of 20 seasons, the lone exception being 2006 (Oklahoma State).

The University of Iowa wrestling program sold out of season tickets for the first time in program history in 2021. Iowa led the nation in attendance for the 14th consecutive season in 2019-20, setting an NCAA average attendance record of 12,568 fans in seven home dates. Official attendance records were not kept in 2020-21. The 2019-20 season marked the 12th straight that Iowa averaged more than 8,000 fans. It also marked the first time in NCAA history that a program put more than 10,000 fans in the building for every home dual.

== Championships ==
=== NCAA team championships ===
Year	Coach	NCAA Meet Points	Duals Record (W-L-T)
1975	Gary Kurdelmeier	102	17-0-1
1976	Gary Kurdelmeier	123.5	14-1-0
1978	Dan Gable	94.5	15-1-0
1979	Dan Gable	122.5	19-0-0
1980	Dan Gable	110.75	17-1
1981	Dan Gable	129.75	21-1-0
1982	Dan Gable	131.75	16-0-1
1983	Dan Gable	155	17-1-0
1984	Dan Gable	123.75	16-1-0
1985	Dan Gable	145.25	18-0-0
1986	Dan Gable	158	16-1
1991	Dan Gable	157	25-0-1
1992	Dan Gable	149	16-0-0
1993	Dan Gable	123.75	14-1-1
1995	Dan Gable	134	14-0-0
1996	Dan Gable	122.5	17-0-0
1997	Dan Gable	170	15-1
1998	Jim Zalesky	115	13-3
1999	Jim Zalesky	100.5	13-4
2000	Jim Zalesky	116	18-0
2008	Tom Brands	117.5	21-1-0
2009	Tom Brands	96.5	24-0-0
2010	Tom Brands	134.5	23-0-0
2021	Tom Brands	129	7-0-0
24 NCAA Championships

=== Big Ten Team Championships ===
Iowa Big Ten Conference team titles: 1915, 1916, 1958, 1962, 1974, 1975, 1976, 1977, 1978, 1979, 1980, 1981, 1982,1983, 1984, 1985, 1986, 1987, 1988, 1989, 1990, 1991, 1992, 1993, 1994, 1995, 1996, 1997, 1998, 2000, 2004, 2008, 2009, 2010, 2015, 2020, 2021

=== Big Ten Regular Season Champions ===
The Hawkeyes have won or shared the Big Ten regular season championships 13 times since the conference started recognizing a dual meet champion in 1999. Iowa won the title outright in 2000, 2008, 2009, 2010, 2011, 2013, 2015 and 2020, and shared the title in 2003, 2014, 2016, 2019, and 2021.

=== NCAA individual champions ===
- Royce Alger 1987 1988
- Ed Banach 1980 1981 1983
- Lou Banach 1981 1983
- Leslie Beers 1928
- Jay Borschel 2010
- Terry Brands 1990 1992
- Tom Brands 1990 1991 1992†
- Peter Bush 1982
- Chris Campbell 1976 1977
- Rico Chiapparelli 1987
- Cory Clark 2017
- Jim Craig 1959
- Barry Davis 1982 1983 1985†
- Kevin Dresser 1986
- Lee Fullhart 1997
- Duane Goldman 1986
- Richard Govig 1954
- Jim Heffernan 1986
- Dan Holm 1975
- Mark Ironside 1997 1998
- Eric Juergens 2000 2001
- Bruce Kinseth 1979†
- Marty Kistler 1985 1986†
- Gary Kurdelmeier 1958
- Spencer Lee 2018 2019 2021
- Kenneth Leuer 1956
- Randy Lewis 1979 1980
- Terry McCann 1955 1956
- Matt McDonough 2010 2012
- Jeff McGinness 1995 1998
- Lincoln McIlravy 1993 1994 1997†
- Brent Metcalf 2008† 2010
- Steve Mocco 2003
- Cliff Moore 2004
- Brad Penrith 1986
- Mark Perry 2007 2008
- Tony Ramos (wrestler) 2014
- Mark Reiland 1991
- Simon Roberts 1957
- Joe Scarpello 1947 1950
- Doug Schwab 1999
- Joel Sharratt 1994
- Dan Sherman 1973
- Brad Smith 1976
- Terry Steiner 1993†
- Troy Steiner 1992
- Derek St. John 2013
- Sherwyn Thorson 1962
- Daryl Weber 1996
- Jessie Whitmer 1997
- Joe Williams 1996 1997 1998†
- T.J. Williams 1999 2001
- Chuck Yagla 1975 1976†
- Bill Zadick 1996
- Jim Zalesky 1982 1983 1984†

†Denotes tournament most outstanding wrestler

== Awards ==
Dan Hodge Trophy

- 1998 – Mark Ironside
- 2008 – Brent Metcalf
- 2020, 2021 – Spencer Lee

Iowa wrestling statistical leaders

SEASON WINS:

- 1. Barry Davis (1981-82): 46
- 2. Tom Brands (1990-91): 45
- 3. Mark Reiland (1990-91): 44
- T4. Barry Davis (1984-85), Terry Brands (1990-91): 43

CAREER WINS:

- 1. Barry Davis (1981-85):162
- 2. Tom Brands (1988-92):158
- 3. Troy Steiner (1990-93): 148
- 4. Ed Banach (1980-83): 141
- 5. Terry Brands (1988-92): 137

SEASON PINS:

- 1. Bruce Kinseth (1978-79): 23
- T2. John Bowlsby (1976-77) & Ed Banach (1982-83): 22
- 4. Brent Metcalf (2008-09): 20
- T5. Randy Lewis (1978-79; 1979-80), Ed Banach (1981-82), Royce Alger (1987-88) & Luke Moffitt (2001-02): 19

CAREER PINS:

- 1. Ed Banach (1980-83): 73
- 2. Randy Lewis (1978-81): 64
- 3. John Bowlsby (1975-79): 59
- T4. Rico Chiapparelli (1983-87), Royce Alger (1984-88), Jaydin Eierman (2017-19, 21,22): 49

== Former wrestlers who have served as collegiate wrestling head coaches ==
- Terry Brands 2002–2005, Tennessee-Chattanooga 2006-present, Iowa (Associate Head Coach)
- Tom Brands 2005–2006, Virginia Tech/ 2007–present, Iowa
- Barry Davis 1994–2018, Wisconsin
- Kevin Dresser 2006–2017, Virginia Tech/2017-present, Iowa State
- Tony Ersland 2014–present, Purdue
- Duane Goldman 1992–2018, Indiana
- Jim Heffernan 2009–present, Illinois
- Steve Martin 2003–2020, Old Dominion
- Keith Mourlam 1996-2004, Virginia Tech
- Tony Ramos 2019-present, North Carolina (Associate Head Coach)
- Greg Randall 2003–2017, Boise State
- Bob Riehm 1969–1994, Southern Oregon University
- Tom Ryan 1995–2006 Hofstra/ 2007–present, Ohio State
- Doug Schwab 2010–present, Northern Iowa
- Joel Sharratt 2006–2013, Air Force/ 2014–2020, Navy
- Troy Steiner 2016-2020, Fresno State
- Jim Zalesky 1997–2006, Iowa / 2006–2020, Oregon State

== Olympians ==
Iowa wrestlers in the Olympics
Year	Name	Country	Style	Weight Class	Place
1928 Amsterdam	Leslie Beers	United States	Freestyle	72 kg	ALT
1948 London	Joe Scarpello	United States	Freestyle	79 kg	ALT
1960 Rome	Terry McCann	United States	Freestyle	57 kg	Gold
1968 Mexico City	Steve Combs	United States	Freestyle	78 kg	DNP
1980 Moscow	Chris Campbell	United States	Freestyle	82 kg	Boycott
1980 Moscow	Randy Lewis	United States	Freestyle	62 kg	Boycott
1980 Moscow	Chuck Yagla	United States	Freestyle	68 kg	Boycott
1984 Los Angeles	Ed Banach	United States	Freestyle	90 kg	Gold
1984 Los Angeles	Lou Banach	United States	Freestyle	100 kg	Gold
1984 Los Angeles	Barry Davis	United States	Freestyle	57 kg	Silver
1984 Los Angeles	Randy Lewis	United States	Freestyle	62 kg	Gold
1988 Seoul	Barry Davis	United States	Freestyle	57 kg	DNP
1992 Barcelona	Chris Campbell	United States	Freestyle	90 kg	Bronze
1996 Atlanta	Tom Brands	United States	Freestyle	62 kg	Gold
2000 Sydney	Terry Brands	United States	Freestyle	58 kg	Bronze
2000 Sydney	Lincoln McIlravy	United States	Freestyle	69 kg	Bronze
2004 Athens	Joe Williams	United States	Men's Freestyle	74 kg	5th
2008 Beijing	Steve Mocco	United States	Men's Freestyle	120 kg	6th
2008 Beijing	Doug Schwab	United States	Men's Freestyle	66 kg	14th
2008 Beijing	Mike Zadick	United States	Men's Freestyle	60 kg	18th
2016 Rio de Janeiro	Daniel Dennis	United States	Men's Freestyle	57 kg	19th
2020 Tokyo	Thomas Gilman	United States	Men's Freestyle	57 kg	Bronze
2024 Paris	Kennedy Blades	United States	Women's Freestyle	76 kg	Silver
2024 Paris	Spencer Lee	United States	Men's Freestyle	57 kg	Silver

== Notable Iowa wrestlers ==
- Royce Alger – former MMA fighter, World silver medalist in freestyle wrestling, two-time NCAA Champion and three-time All-American
- Ed Banach – Olympic gold medalist at 1984 Summer Olympics in freestyle wrestling, three-time NCAA Champion and four-time All-American
- Lou Banach – Olympic gold medalist at 1984 Summer Olympics in freestyle wrestling, two-time NCAA Champion
- Terry Brands – Olympic bronze medalist at 2000 Summer Olympics in freestyle wrestling, two-time World Champion, two-time NCAA Champion and three-time All-American
- Tom Brands – Olympic gold medalist at 1996 Summer Olympics in freestyle wrestling, World Champion, three-time NCAA Champion and four-time All-American, has led Iowa to four national championships as a head coach
- Chris Campbell – Olympic bronze medalist at 1992 Summer Olympics, World gold and silver medals, two-time NCAA Champion and three-time All-American
- Rico Chiapparelli – former MMA fighter and trainer, NCAA Champion
- Barry Davis – Olympic silver medalist at 1984 Summer Olympics, two-time World medalist, three-time NCAA Champion and four-time All-American
- Daniel Dennis – Olympian at 2016 Summer Olympics in freestyle wrestling, NCAA finalist and two-time All-American
- Austin DeSanto – Four-time All-American, RAF Bantamweight Champion
- Kevin Dresser – NCAA Champion and two-time All-American, head wrestling coach at Virginia Tech (2006–2017), Iowa State (2017–present)
- Thomas Gilman – Olympic bronze medalist at 2020 Summer Olympics in freestyle wrestling, World Champion and two-time medalist, NCAA finalist and three-time All-American
- Andy Haman – professional superheavyweight bodybuilder
- Jim Heffernan – NCAA Champion and four-time All-American
- Jordan Johnson – former UFC fighter
- Spencer Lee – Olympic silver medalist at 2024 Summer Olympics in freestyle wrestling, two-time Junior World Champion and one-time Cadet World Champion, three-time NCAA Champion
- Randy Lewis – Olympic gold medalist at 1984 Summer Olympics in freestyle wrestling, two-time NCAA Champion and four-time All-American
- Izzy Martinez – coach, and chief operating officer of Real American Freestyle
- Terry McCann – Olympic gold medalist at 1960 Summer Olympics in freestyle wrestling, two-time NCAA Champion
- Matt McDonough – two-time NCAA Champion and three-time finalist
- Lincoln McIlravy – Olympic bronze medalist at 2000 Summer Olympics, two-time World medalist, three-time NCAA Champion and four-time finalist
- Brent Metcalf – former member of Team USA Freestyle World Team, two-time NCAA Champion and three-time finalist
- Bella Mir – NCAA Champion and mixed martial artist
- Steve Mocco – NCAA Champion and two-time finalist at Iowa
- Tony Ramos – former member of Team USA Freestyle World Team, NCAA Champion, two-time NCAA finalist and three-time All-American
- Doug Schwab – Olympian at 2008 Summer Olympics in freestyle wrestling, NCAA Champion and three-time All-American
- Terry Steiner – NCAA Champion and three-time All-American
- Joe Williams – Olympian at 2004 Summer Olympics in freestyle wrestling, two-time World bronze medalist, three-time NCAA Champion and four-time All-American
- Bill Zadick – 2006 World Champion in freestyle wrestling, NCAA Champion and two-time finalist
- Mike Zadick – Olympian at 2008 Summer Olympics, three-time NCAA All-American
- Jim Zalesky – three-time NCAA Champion and four-time All-American, led Iowa to three national championships as a head coach

== See also ==
- Iowa–Penn State wrestling rivalry
- National Wrestling Hall of Fame and Museum
- Glen Brand Wrestling Hall of Fame of Iowa
