= Tom Brands =

American wrestler (born 1968)

Personal information
- Born: April 9, 1968 (age 58) Omaha, Nebraska, U.S.
- Home town: Sheldon, Iowa, U.S.

Sport
- Country: United States
- Sport: Wrestling
- Events: Freestyle and Folkstyle
- College team: Iowa
- Club: Hawkeye Wrestling Club
- Team: USA
- Coached by: Dan Gable
Medal record
Men's freestyle wrestling
Representing the United States
Olympic Games
Gold medal – first place	1996 Atlanta	62 kg
World Championships
Gold medal – first place	1993 Toronto	62 kg
Pan American Games
Gold medal – first place	1995 Mar del Plata	62 kg
Collegiate Wrestling
Representing the Iowa Hawkeyes
NCAA Division I Championships
Gold medal – first place	1990 College Park	134 lb
Gold medal – first place	1991 Iowa City	134 lb
Gold medal – first place	1992 Oklahoma City	134 lb
Big Ten Championships
Gold medal – first place	1989 West Lafayette	126 lb
Gold medal – first place	1991 Champaign	134 lb
Gold medal – first place	1992 Madison	134 lb
Silver medal – second place	1990 Evanston	134 lb

Tom Brands (born April 9, 1968) is an American former folkstyle and freestyle wrestler. He is currently the head coach of the University of Iowa men's wrestling team. Brands won a gold medal at the 1996 Summer Olympics.

== Wrestling career ==
An intense competitor, Brands' wrestling career with the University of Iowa included a record of 158-7-2 and an undefeated season in 1991 where he was 45–0. He was a four-time All-American, three-time NCAA Champion, three-time Big Ten Conference champion, and Outstanding Wrestler at the 1992 NCAA tournament. His twin brother, Terry, was also an Olympic medalist and a standout at Iowa.

Internationally, Brands won a gold medal at the 1996 Atlanta Olympics in freestyle at 136.6 pounds; a gold medal at the 1993 World Freestyle Championships in Toronto; two World Cup gold medals (1994 and 1995); and the gold at the 1995 Pan American Games. He won four U.S. Nationals titles (1993–96) and made four straight U.S. World or Olympic teams (1993–96). He was named 1993 USA Wrestling Athlete of the Year, 1993 John Smith Outstanding Freestyle Wrestler, and 1993 Amateur Wrestling News Man of the Year.

In 2001, he was inducted into the National Wrestling Hall of Fame as a Distinguished Member.

== Coaching career ==
Brands served 12 seasons as assistant coach for the Hawkeyes, from 1993 to 2004. Brands was named National Wrestling Coaches Association Assistant Coach of the Year in 2000. He also served as head coach at Virginia Tech for two seasons. In the spring of 2006, Tom Brands returned to the University of Iowa as head coach. Brands led the Hawkeyes to national titles in 2008, 2009, 2010 and 2021. Under Brands, Iowa also captured conference titles in 2008, 2009, 2010, were the 2015 co-champions with Ohio State and were the 2021 co-champions with Penn State.

During Brands' tenure as head coach, 8 different wrestlers have won individual national titles, and Iowa has won over 200 dual meets.

NCAA Champions under Tom Brands

- Jay Borschel
- Matt McDonough (2×)
- Brent Metcalf (2×)
- Mark Perry (2×)
- Tony Ramos
- Derek St. John
- Cory Clark
- Spencer Lee (3×)
- Stephen Buchanan II

Head coaching results
Season	Dual Record	Conference record	Conference Finish	NCAA Finish
Virginia Tech
2004–05	16–4–0	5–0–0	2nd place, silver medalist(s)	T-42nd
2005–06	1–16–0	1–4–0	5th	29th
Va Tech Totals:	17–20–0	6–4–0		
Iowa
2006–07	14–5–0	5–3–0	3rd place, bronze medalist(s)	8th
2007–08	21–1–0	8–0–0	1st place, gold medalist(s)	1st place, gold medalist(s)
2008–09	24–0–0	8–0–0	1st place, gold medalist(s)	1st place, gold medalist(s)
2009–10	23–0–0	8–0–0	1st place, gold medalist(s)	1st place, gold medalist(s)
2010–11	15–0–1	8–0–0	2nd place, silver medalist(s)	3rd place, bronze medalist(s)
2011–12	14–4–0	6–2–0	3rd place, bronze medalist(s)	3rd place, bronze medalist(s)
2012–13	20–3–0	8–0–0	3rd place, bronze medalist(s)	4th
2013–14	15–2–0	7–1–0	2nd place, silver medalist(s)	4th
2014–15	17–1–0	9–0–0	1st place, gold medalist(s)	2nd place, silver medalist(s)
2015–16	16–1–0	9–0–0	2nd place, silver medalist(s)	5th
2016–17	13–2–0	8–1–0	3rd place, bronze medalist(s)	4th
2017–18	12–3–0	6–3–0	4th	3rd place, bronze medalist(s)
2018–19	14–1–0	9–0–0	3rd place, bronze medalist(s)	4th
2019–20	13–0–0	9–0–0	1st place, gold medalist(s)	—
2020–21	5–0–0	5–0–0	1st place, gold medalist(s)	1st place, gold medalist(s)
2021–22	14–1–0	7–1–0	3rd place, bronze medalist(s)	3rd place, bronze medalist(s)
2022–23	15–1–0	7–1–0	2nd place, silver medalist(s)	2nd place, silver medalist(s)
2023–24	12–2–0	6–2–0	4th	5th
2024–25	14–1–0	7–1–0	3rd place, bronze medalist(s)	4th
Iowa Totals:	291–28–1	140–15–0		
Career Totals:	308–48–1	146–19–0		

== Personal life ==
Brands and his twin brother Terry were both coached by Dan Gable. Brands has authored several instructional VHS/DVD products that teach and advocate his "in-your-face" style of wrestling.

He grew up in Sheldon, Iowa and holds a Bachelor of Science degree in physical education from the University of Iowa.

Brands is married and has three children, two daughters and a son.
