= Terry Brands =

American wrestler (born 1968)

Personal information
- Born: April 9, 1968 (age 58) Omaha, Nebraska, U.S.
- Home town: Sheldon, Iowa, U.S.

Sport
- Country: United States
- Sport: Wrestling
- Events: Freestyle and Folkstyle
- College team: Iowa
- Club: Hawkeye Wrestling Club
- Team: USA
- Coached by: Dan Gable
Medal record
Men's freestyle wrestling
Representing the United States
Olympic Games
Bronze medal – third place	2000 Sydney	58 kg
World Championships
Gold medal – first place	1993 Toronto	57 kg
Gold medal – first place	1995 Atlanta	57 kg
Pan American Games
Gold medal – first place	1995 Mar del Plata	57 kg
Collegiate Wrestling
Representing the Iowa Hawkeyes
NCAA Division I Championships
Gold medal – first place	1990 College Park	126 lb
Gold medal – first place	1992 Oklahoma City	126 lb
Silver medal – second place	1991 Iowa City	126 lb
Big Ten Championships
Gold medal – first place	1990 Evanston	126 lb
Gold medal – first place	1991 Champaign	126 lb
Gold medal – first place	1992 Madison	126 lb

Terry Brands (born April 9, 1968) is an American former folkstyle and freestyle wrestler. He won two World Championships and a bronze medal at the 2000 Summer Olympics. He currently serves as an associate head coach at the University of Iowa.

== Wrestling career ==
Brands grew up in Sheldon, Iowa. While wrestling at the University of Iowa, Brands won NCAA titles in 1990 and 1992, both at 126 pounds.

He was a two-time world champion in freestyle wrestling at 58 kg, winning titles in 1993 and 1995. Brands lost to Kendall Cross at the 1996 Olympic trials. Cross went on to win the gold medal in Atlanta. Brands reached the Olympics in 2000 and won a bronze medal.

In 2006, Brands was inducted into the National Wrestling Hall of Fame as a Distinguished Member.

== Coaching career ==
After serving as resident coach for the United States Olympic Training Center in Colorado Springs, Colorado, he currently is associate head coach for the University of Iowa Hawkeyes, serving under his twin brother Tom Brands. Tom, a fellow wrestler, won a gold medal in the 1996 Summer Olympics.

Terry Brands now serves as associate head coach at the University of Iowa. Since coaching at Iowa, he has set school records for the longest dual unbeaten streak (84), longest winning streak (69), and most dual shutouts (8). He also coaches the Hawkeye Wrestling Club and was named the 2014 Terry McCann Freestyle Coach of the Year.
