= Silas Allred =

American wrestler (born 2002)

Personal information
- Full name: Silas Allred
- Born: May 28, 2002 (age 24) Anderson, Indiana, U.S.
- Height: 6 ft 0 in (183 cm)
- Weight: 184 lb (83 kg)
- Spouse: Jhade Isabelle (m. 2021)
- Parents: Eric Allred (father); Dana Ellis (mother)

Sport
- Country: United States
- Sport: Wrestling
- Weight class: 184 lb (83 kg)
- Events: Folkstyle and Freestyle
- College team: Nebraska (2020–2026)
- Club: Sunkist Kids WC
- Coached by: Mark Manning (2020–2026)
Medal record
Men's freestyle wrestling
Representing the United States
US National Championships
Silver medal – second place	2022 Las Vegas	92 kg
Collegiate Wrestling
Representing the Nebraska Cornhuskers
Big Ten Championships
Gold medal – first place	2023 Ann Arbor	197 lb
Bronze medal – third place	2024 College Park	197 lb
- Updated on January 7, 2024

Silas Allred (born May 28, 2002) is an American folkstyle and freestyle wrestler who competes at 184 pounds for the Nebraska Cornhuskers. He is a two-time Indiana state champion and a Big Ten champion.

== Amateur wrestling career ==
=== High school ===
Allred attended Shenandoah High School in Middletown, Indiana. He finished his high school career with a 146–2 record, making three trips IHSAA State Finals, and becoming a back-to-back state champion in 2019 and 2020.

Allred won the ISWA State Finals triple crown in 2017, making the USA Wrestling Cadet National Championships. Allred would not place in freestyle but would place fourth in Greco-Roman, earning Fargo All-American status. In 2018, Allred won the ISWA Folkstyle State Finals and the USA Wrestling Folkstyle Cadet National Championships. During the 2019 FloNationals US Cadet Pan American Team Trials, Allred finished first in freestyle and second in Greco-Roman. During the 2019 UWW US World Team Trials, Allred finished third in Greco-Roman but broke his elbow in a freestyle match. His injury forced him to withdraw from the 2019 Cadet Pan American Championships.

=== College ===
On National Signing Day in November 2019, Allred committed to Mark Manning and the Nebraska Cornhuskers as the No. 1 ranked 195-pounder and No. 2 ranked overall wrestler in the state of Indiana.

==== 2020–2021 ====
Due to the COVID-19 pandemic, Allred's freshman season was postponed to 2021. Allred made his senior debut when he competed in the 2020 US Senior Nationals at 97 kilograms. Allred would drop both of his matches.

In January, Nebraska announced they would wrestle with nine total opponents in six meets. Allred would make his collegiate debut as an extra on January 8 against Minnesota, losing by decision to Dylan Anderson. A week later, Allred would wrestle as an extra again against Iowa, winning his first collegiate match after he beat Connor Corbin by major decision. Allred finished his true freshman season 1–1, but due to the COVID-19 eligibility rules he did not use up any of his eligibility and would be considered a freshman for the 2021–22 wrestling season.

==== 2021–2022 ====
Allred sat behind Eric Schultz, Cade Svoboda, and Anthony Gaona during the 2021–22 season while redshirting. During the 2021 Daktronic Open, Allred would win via pinfall over Yonger Bastida – who would become an All-American later that year – on his way to an individual championship. Allred would also wrestle in the 2022 Hastings Open, winning three of his four matches via fall to claim his second individual championship of the season. Allred finished with an undefeated 3–0 (6–0) record as a redshirt.

Allred began wrestling in junior-level events in 2022, finishing second in the US Open and US World Team Trials.

==== 2022–2023 ====
Allred was named the 197-pound starter for the 2022–23 season. He made his dual-meet debut on November 4, beating North Dakota State's Owen Pentz 4–2 in sudden victory. During Nebraska's 2022 in-season tournaments, Allred went a combined 5–0 in the Journeymen Collegiate Classic and Navy Classic to win two individual titles. On February 7, Allred was named Big Ten Wrestler of the Week after earning pins over Zac Braunagel and Hayden Copass. During the 2023 Big Ten Wrestling Championships, Allred advanced to the finals against Penn State's Max Dean, who won the 2022 national championship at 197 pounds. Allred would upset Dean to become the first Nebraska wrestler to win a Big Ten championship since 2015. Allred then received an automatic berth to the 2023 NCAA Division I Wrestling Championships, where he would reach the quarterfinals before being handed his first loss against Nino Bonaccorsi by way of a 5–3 decision. Allred's season would end in a 1–0 blood round loss to Jacob Warner, one win away from gaining All-American status. Allred finished his redshirt freshman season with a 28–7 record.

Allred returned to senior-level competitions in 2023, finishing fourth at the US Open. At the 2023 US U23 Nationals, Allred finished in sixth after having to medically forfeit his final two matches.

==== 2023–2024 ====
Allred beat freshman Dominic Thebeau in Nebraska's wrestle-offs to become the Cornhuskers starter. Nebraska began the 2023–24 season against North Dakota State, where Allred would pick up a 20–4 tech fall victory over Spencer Mooberry. During the 2023 Navy Classic, Allred went 4–1 to finish second in the tournament. On December 16, Nebraska took on South Dakota State. Allred was sent out to face Luke Rasmussen in the 285-pound matchup. During the first period, Allred would hit his head on Rasmussen's knee, sending him into concussion protocol, and forcing him to medically forfeit out of the match. Allred ended the dual season against Arizona State's Jacob Meissner, winning via tech fall, his seventh of the season. During the 2024 Big Ten Wrestling Championships, Allred made it to the semifinals before matching up against No. 1 ranked Aaron Brooks. Brooks defeated Allred by major decision, sending him to the consolation semifinal round to face Luke Geog. Against Geog, Allred scored a takedown in the second period, appearing to unintentionally injury Geog's leg in the process. Allred was given the win via injury default. Allred would then win the third-place match against Jaxon Smith, automatically qualifying him for the 2024 NCAA Division I Wrestling Championships. Allred would reach the quarterfinals again before losing his match against Trent Hidlay by major decision. He would then lose to Jacob Cardenas in the blood round to finish one win away from gaining All-American status for the second straight year. Allred finished his sophomore season with a 26–8 record.

==== 2024–2025 ====
Before the start of the 2024–25 season, Allred moved down to 184 pounds. In Nebraska's wrestle-offs, Allred pinned true freshman Marco Christiansen in the first period, earning a starting spot. In his 184-pound debut, Allred defeated Utah Valley's Caleb Uhlenhopp 11–7. During the 2024 Navy Classic, Allred had five straight bonus point wins to take home to individual championship. In the 2024 Kent State Open, Allred earned a tech fall in three-straight matches to win his second individual championship of the season. As Nebraska started the regular dual season, Allred lost three straight matches, including a loss to No. 1 ranked Carter Starocci. However, he would win his final five straight matches including four bonus point victories to be named No. 12 ranked wrestler for the 2025 Big Ten Wrestling Championships. Allred would go 2–3 during the tournament and finished sixth to qualify for the 2025 NCAA Division I Men's Wrestling Championships. Allred would win his first two matches via fall, but would be beaten by Dustin Plott in the Quarterfinals. In the Wrestlebacks, Allred would win his first match against Dylan Fishback, but would lose his chance at a medal when he lost to Jaxon Smith in the following round. Allred would be placed in the 7th place match against Indiana's Donnell Washington. In a match that went to the whistle, Allred won 4–2 and earned All-American status for the first time in his career. Allred finished his junior season with a 22–8 record.

==== 2025–2026 ====
Allred entered his senior season as the No. 6 ranked 184-pounder in the country. On October 24, 2025, Allred defeated redshirt freshman Marco Christiansen via fall in Nebraska's wrestle-offs, keeping his starting spot. During the 2025 Navy Classic, Allred won all four matches to win his third career Navy Classic individual championship.

== Freestyle record ==
Senior & U23 Freestyle Matches
Res.	Record	Opponent	Score	Date	Event	Location
2023 US U23 Nationals 6th at 92 kg
Loss		(United States) Martin Cosgrove	FF	June 2–4, 2023	2023 US U23 Nationals	(United States) Geneva, Ohio
Loss		(United States) Nicholas Willham	FF	June 2–4, 2023	2023 US U23 Nationals	(United States) Geneva, Ohio
Loss	7–5	(United States) Luke Surber	TF 4–14	June 2–4, 2023	2023 US U23 Nationals	(United States) Geneva, Ohio
Win	7–4	(United States) Evan Bockman	TF 12–2	June 2–4, 2023	2023 US U23 Nationals	(United States) Geneva, Ohio
Win	6–4	(United States) Kalob Runyon	TF 10–0	June 2–4, 2023	2023 US U23 Nationals	(United States) Geneva, Ohio
Win	5–4	(United States) Kael Wisler	TF 10–0	June 2–4, 2023	2023 US U23 Nationals	(United States) Geneva, Ohio
2023 US Open 4th at 97 kg
Loss	4–4	(United States) Timothy Dudley	6–10	April 26–30, 2023	2023 US Open National Championships	(United States) Las Vegas, Nevada
Win	4–3	(United States) Samuel Mitchell	10–7	April 26–30, 2023	2023 US Open National Championships	(United States) Las Vegas, Nevada
Win	3–3	(United States) Malik McDonald	TF 13–2	April 26–30, 2023	2023 US Open National Championships	(United States) Las Vegas, Nevada
Win	2–3	(United States) Kash Anderson	TF 14–4	April 26–30, 2023	2023 US Open National Championships	(United States) Las Vegas, Nevada
Loss	1–3	(United States) Isaac Trumble	TF 0–10	April 26–30, 2023	2023 US Open National Championships	(United States) Las Vegas, Nevada
Win	1–2	(United States) Morgan Smith	8–2	April 26–30, 2023	2023 US Open National Championships	(United States) Las Vegas, Nevada
2020 US Nationals DNP at 97 kg
Loss	0–2	(United States) Nick Reenan	14–20	October 9–11, 2020	2020 US Senior Nationals	(United States) Coralville, Iowa
Loss	0–1	(United States) Scottie Boykin	TF 3–14	October 9–11, 2020	2020 US Senior Nationals	(United States) Coralville, Iowa

== NCAA record ==
NCAA Division I Record
Res.	Record	Opponent	Score	Date	Event
2026 NCAA Championships TBD at 184 lbs
				March 19–21, 2026	2026 NCAA Division I National Championships
2026 Big Ten Championships TBD at 184 lbs
				March 7–8, 2026	2026 Big Ten Conference Championships
				February 21, 2026	Nebraska - Utah Valley Dual
				February 15, 2026	Nebraska - Indiana Dual
				February 13, 2026	Nebraska - Illinois Dual
				February 8, 2026	Northwestern - Nebraska Dual
				January 30, 2026	Nebraska - Penn State Dual
				January 25, 2026	Ohio State - Nebraska Dual
				January 23, 2026	Iowa - Nebraska Dual
				January 16, 2026	Nebraska - Minnesota Dual
				January 9, 2026	Purdue - Nebraska Dual
				January 3, 2026	Northern Iowa - Nebraska Dual
				December 21, 2025	Oklahoma State - Nebraska Dual
				December 19, 2025	North Carolina - Nebraska Dual
				December 5, 2025	Nebraska - Missouri Dual
				December 5, 2025	Nebraska - Brown Dual
		Brock Mantanona		November 15, 2025	Nebraska - Michigan Dual
Win	83–24	Rylan Rogers	4–2	November 15, 2025	Nebraska - Lehigh Dual
Win	82–24	David Barrett	Fall	November 7, 2025	Army - Nebraska Dual
2025 Navy Classic (gold) at 184 lbs
Win	81–24	Malachi Duvall	SV–1 9–6	November 2, 2025	2025 Navy Classic
Win	80–24	Will Ebert	TF 18–2	November 2, 2025	2025 Navy Classic
Win	79–24	Lucas Daly	MD 15–2	November 2, 2025	2025 Navy Classic
Win	78–24	Bryce Phillips	INJ	November 2, 2025	2025 Navy Classic
Start of 2025–2026 Season (senior year)
End of 2024–2025 Season (junior year)
2025 NCAA Championships 7th at 184 lbs
Win	77–24	Donnell Washington	4–2	March 20–22, 2025	2025 NCAA Division I National Championships
Loss	76–24	Jaxon Smith	1–8	March 20–22, 2025	2025 NCAA Division I National Championships
Win	76–23	Dylan Fishback	4–0	March 20–22, 2025	2025 NCAA Division I National Championships
Loss	75–23	Dustin Plott	5–12	March 20–22, 2025	2025 NCAA Division I National Championships
Win	75–22	Bennett Berge	Fall	March 20–22, 2025	2025 NCAA Division I National Championships
Win	74–22	Malachi DuVall	Fall	March 20–22, 2025	2025 NCAA Division I National Championships
2025 Big Ten Championships 6th at 184 lbs
Loss	73–22	Gabe Arnold	3–4	March 8–9, 2025	2025 Big Ten Conference Championships
Loss	73–21	Jaxon Smith	2–4	March 8–9, 2025	2025 Big Ten Conference Championships
Win	73–20	Shane Cartagena-Walsh	MFOR	March 8–9, 2025	2025 Big Ten Conference Championships
Loss	72–20	Edmond Ruth	3–4	March 8–9, 2025	2025 Big Ten Conference Championships
Win	72–19	Orlando Cruz	Fall	March 8–9, 2025	2025 Big Ten Conference Championships
Win	71–19	Donnell Washington	MD 17–6	February 16, 2025	Indiana - Nebraska Dual
Win	70–19	Gabe Arnold	SV–1 4–1	February 7, 2025	Nebraska - Iowa Dual
Win	69–19	Dylan Russo	MD 14–3	January 31, 2025	Wisconsin - Nebraska Dual
Win	68–19	Lucas Daly	TF 21–5	January 26, 2025	Nebraska - Michigan State Dual
Win	67–19	Jaden Bullock	TF 21–6	January 24, 2025	Nebraska - Michigan Dual
Loss	66–19	Carter Starocci	MD 2–11	January 17, 2025	Penn State - Nebraska Dual
Loss	66–18	Max McEnelly	MD 6–16	January 11, 2025	Minnesota - Nebraska Dual
Loss	66–17	Parker Keckeisen	Fall	January 5, 2025	Nebraska - Northern Iowa Dual
2024 Kent State Open (gold) at 184 lbs
Win	66–16	Wyatt Ferguson	TF 21–6	December 20, 2024	2024 Kent State Holiday Classic Open
Win	65–16	Trent Thomas	TF 19–4	December 20, 2024	2024 Kent State Holiday Classic Open
Win	64–16	Cody Brenner	TF 19–4	December 20, 2024	2024 Kent State Holiday Classic Open
2024 Navy Classic (gold) at 184 lbs
Win	63–16	Daniel Williams	MD 8–0	November 23, 2024	2024 Navy Classic
Win	62–16	TJ McDonnell	Fall	November 23, 2024	2024 Navy Classic
Win	61–16	Jeremy Olszko	MD 13–2	November 23, 2024	2024 Navy Classic
Win	60–16	Roy Price	TF 17–1	November 23, 2024	2024 Navy Classic
Win	59–16	Mikey Bartush	Fall	November 23, 2024	2024 Navy Classic
Win	58–16	Gavin Kane	8–6	November 15, 2024	Nebraska - North Carolina Dual
Win	57–16	Conor Maslanek	TF 19–4	November 15, 2024	Nebraska - Campbell Dual
Win	56–16	Caleb Uhlenhopp	11–7	November 8, 2024	Utah Valley - Nebraska Dual
Start of 2024–2025 Season (junior year)
End of 2023–2024 Season (sophomore year)
2024 NCAA Championships DNP at 197 lbs
Loss	55–16	Jacob Cardenas	2–5	March 21–23, 2024	2024 NCAA Division I National Championships
Loss	55–15	Trent Hidlay	MD 3–11	March 21–23, 2024	2024 NCAA Division I National Championships
Win	55–14	Andy Smith	4–2	March 21–23, 2024	2024 NCAA Division I National Championships
Win	54–14	Luke Geog	10–3	March 21–23, 2024	2024 NCAA Division I National Championships
2024 Big Ten Championships (bronze) at 197 lbs
Win	53–14	Jaxon Smith	10–3	March 9–10, 2024	2024 Big Ten Conference Championships
Win	52–14	Luke Geog	INJ	March 9–10, 2024	2024 Big Ten Conference Championships
Loss	51–14	Aaron Brooks	MD 2–14	March 9–10, 2024	2024 Big Ten Conference Championships
Win	51–13	Garrett Joles	5–4	March 9–10, 2024	2024 Big Ten Conference Championships
Win	50–13	Bobby Striggow	TF 19–4	March 9–10, 2024	2024 Big Ten Conference Championships
Win	49–13	Jacob Meissner	TF 21–6	February 25, 2024	Nebraska - Arizona State Dual
Loss	48–13	Aaron Brooks	MD 4–17	February 18, 2024	Nebraska - Penn State Dual
Win	48–12	Bobby Striggow	MD 14–2	February 9, 2024	Michigan - Nebraska Dual
Win	47–12	Chase Waggoner	Fall	February 4, 2024	Illinois - Nebraska Dual
Win	46–12	Joshua Otto	TF 19–4	January 28, 2024	Nebraska - Wisconsin Dual
Win	45–12	Evan Bates	TF 19–4	January 26, 2024	Nebraska - Northwestern Dual
Win	44–12	Ben Vanadia	TF 19–4	January 21, 2024	Purdue - Nebraska Dual
Win	43–12	Garrett Joles	SV–1 4–1	January 19, 2024	Nebraska - Minnesota Dual
Loss	42–12	Zach Glazier	MD 2–11	January 12, 2024	Iowa - Nebraska Dual
Win	42–11	Wyatt Voelker	Fall	January 6, 2024	Northern Iowa - Nebraska Dual
Win	41–11	Joey Novak	Fall	January 6, 2024	Wyoming - Nebraska Dual
Loss		Luke Rasmussen	MFOR	December 16, 2023	South Dakota State - Nebraska Dual
2023 Cliff Keen Invitational 5th at 197 lbs
Win	40–11	Sonny Sasso	8–5	December 1, 2023	2023 Cliff Keen Las Vegas Invitational
Loss	39–11	Tanner Sloan	MD 1–12	December 1, 2023	2023 Cliff Keen Las Vegas Invitational
Win	39–10	Joey Novak	Fall	December 1, 2023	2023 Cliff Keen Las Vegas Invitational
Win	38–10	Wyatt Voelker	TF 19–3	December 1, 2023	2023 Cliff Keen Las Vegas Invitational
Loss	37–10	Jacob Cardenas	TF 1–17	December 1, 2023	2023 Cliff Keen Las Vegas Invitational
Win	37–9	Evan Bates	MD 11–2	December 1, 2023	2023 Cliff Keen Las Vegas Invitational
Win	36–9	Jake Trovato	Fall	December 1, 2023	2023 Cliff Keen Las Vegas Invitational
2023 Navy Classic (silver) at 197 lbs
Loss	35–9	Luke Stout	SV–1 1–4	November 18, 2023	2023 Navy Classic
Win	35–8	Aidan Connor	10–5	November 18, 2023	2023 Navy Classic
Win	34–8	Logan Deacetis	TF 18–1	November 18, 2023	2023 Navy Classic
Win	33–8	Garrett Henigin	Fall	November 18, 2023	2023 Navy Classic
Win	32–8	Patrick Brophy	MD 17–4	November 18, 2023	2023 Navy Classic
Win	31–8	Levi Hopkins	11–6	November 10, 2023	Campbell - Nebraska Dual
Win	30–8	Spencer Mooberry	TF 20–4	November 4, 2023	Nebraska - North Dakota State Dual
Start of 2023–2024 Season (sophomore year)
End of 2022–2023 Season (freshman year)
2023 NCAA Championships DNP at 197 lbs
Loss	29–8	Jacob Warner	0–1	March 16–18, 2023	2023 NCAA Division I National Championships
Loss	29–7	Nino Bonaccorsi	3–5	March 16–18, 2023	2023 NCAA Division I National Championships
Win	29–6	Max Dean	7–2	March 16–18, 2023	2023 NCAA Division I National Championships
Win	28–6	Michael Battista	13–7	March 16–18, 2023	2023 NCAA Division I National Championships
2023 Big Ten Championships (gold) at 197 lbs
Win	27–6	Max Dean	6–3	March 4–5, 2023	2023 Big Ten Conference Championships
Win	26–6	Gavin Hoffman	6–2	March 4–5, 2023	2023 Big Ten Conference Championships
Win	25–6	Zac Braunagel	4–3	March 4–5, 2023	2023 Big Ten Conference Championships
Win	24–6	Josh Nummer	TF 27–10	February 19, 2023	Arizona State - Nebraska Dual
Win	23–6	Billy Janzer	6–0	February 12, 2023	Rutgers - Nebraska Dual
Win	22–6	Luke Geog	MD 10–2	February 10, 2023	Nebraska - Ohio State Dual
Win	21–6	Hayden Filipovich	Fall	February 4, 2023	Nebraska - Purdue Dual
Win	20–6	Zac Braunagel	Fall	February 3, 2023	Nebraska - Illinois Dual
Win	19–6	Braxton Amos	7–2	January 29, 2023	Wisconsin - Nebraska Dual
Loss	18–6	Jacob Warner	2–3	January 20, 2023	Nebraska - Iowa Dual
Win	18–5	Andrew Davison	MD 10–2	January 15, 2023	Northwestern - Nebraska Dual
Win	17–5	Michial Foy	6–4	January 13, 2023	Minnesota - Nebraska Dual
Win	16–5	Samuel Mora	Fall	January 7, 2023	Nebraska - Gardner-Webb Dual
Win	15–5	Levi Hopkins	8–3	January 7, 2023	Nebraska - Campbell Dual
Loss	14–5	Tanner Sloan	MD 0–12	December 18, 2022	Nebraska - San Dakota State Dual
2022 Cliff Keen Invitational 5th at 197 lbs
Loss	14–4	Isaac Trumble	1–6	December 2, 2022	2022 Cliff Keen Las Vegas Invitational
Win	14–3	Gavin Hoffman	5–2	December 2, 2022	2022 Cliff Keen Las Vegas Invitational
Loss	13–3	Tanner Sloan	5–12	December 2, 2022	2022 Cliff Keen Las Vegas Invitational
Win		Andy Smith	MFOR	December 2, 2022	2022 Cliff Keen Las Vegas Invitational
Win	13–2	Carson Brewer	Fall	December 2, 2022	2022 Cliff Keen Las Vegas Invitational
Win	12–2	Nolan Springer	Fall	December 2, 2022	2022 Cliff Keen Las Vegas Invitational
2022 Navy Classic (gold) at 197 lbs
Win	11–2	Jacob Lucas	MD 14–4	November 19, 2022	2022 Navy Classic
Win	10–2	Jacob Koser	9–4	November 19, 2022	2022 Navy Classic
Win	9–2	Jacob Lee	Fall	November 19, 2022	2022 Navy Classic
Win	8–2	Mark Chaid	Fall	November 19, 2022	2022 Navy Classic
2022 Journeymen Classic (gold) at 197 lbs
Win		Trey Rogers	MFOR	November 13, 2022	2022 Journeymen Collegiate Classic
Win	7–2	Danny Lawrence	MD 12–2	November 13, 2022	2022 Journeymen Collegiate Classic
Win		Jonathon Fagen	MFOR	November 13, 2022	2022 Journeymen Collegiate Classic
Loss	6–2	Isaac Trumble	2–9	November 12, 2022	Nebraska - North Carolina State Dual
Win	6–1	Kyle Swartz	MD 16–5	November 12, 2022	Nebraska - Army Dual
Win	5–1	Owen Pentz	SV–1 4–2	November 4, 2022	North Dakota State - Nebraska Dual
Start of 2022–2023 Season (freshman year)
End of 2021–2022 Season (redshirt year)
2022 Hastings Open (gold) at 197 lbs
Win		Daniel Bishop	MFOR	January 8, 2022	2022 Hastings Open
Win		Garavous Kouekabakilaho	Fall	January 8, 2022	2022 Hastings Open
Win		Mitchell Peabody	Fall	January 8, 2022	2022 Hastings Open
Win		Jose Sanchez	Fall	January 8, 2022	2022 Hastings Open
2021 Daktronics Open (gold) at 197 lbs
Win	4–1	Nic Casperson	Fall	November 21, 2021	2021 Warren Williamson/Daktronics Open
Win	3–1	Yonger Bastida	Fall	November 21, 2021	2021 Warren Williamson/Daktronics Open
Win	2–1	Adam Ahrendson	TF 19–4	November 21, 2021	2021 Warren Williamson/Daktronics Open
Start of 2021–2022 Season (redshirt year)
End of 2020–2021 Season (covid redshirt year)
Win	1–1	Connor Corbin	MD 12–2	January 15, 2021	Iowa - Nebraska Extra
Loss	0–1	Dylan Anderson	4–8	January 8, 2021	Nebraska - Minnesota Extra
Start of 2020–2021 Season (covid redshirt year)

=== Stats ===
Season	Year	School	Rank	Weigh Class	Record	Win	Bonus
2026	Senior	University of Nebraska–Lincoln	#3	184	5–0	100.00%	80.00%
2025	Junior	University of Nebraska–Lincoln	#8 (7th)	184	22–8	73.33%	56.67%
2024	Sophomore	University of Nebraska–Lincoln	#10 (DNP)	197	26–8	76.47%	52.94%
2023	Freshman	University of Nebraska–Lincoln	#6 (DNP)	197	25–7	78.13%	40.63%
2022	Redshirt	University of Nebraska–Lincoln	#53	197	3–0	100.00%	100.00%
2021	Redshirt	University of Nebraska–Lincoln	#80	197	1–1	50.00%	50.00%
Career					82–24	77.36%	52.83%

== Personal life ==
Silas Allred was born to Eric Allred and Dana Ellis. Silas grew up with eight siblings – five sisters and three brothers. After his freshman year at Nebraska, Silas married his longtime girlfriend, Jhade.
