= 2023 Big Ten Wrestling Championships – 165 lbs =

165 pounds at the 2023 Big Ten Wrestling Championships
- Site: Crisler Center; Ann Arbor, Michigan
- Competitors: 14

Medalists
- 1st place, gold medalist(s): Dean Hamiti (Wisconsin)
- 2nd place, silver medalist(s): Patrick Kennedy (Iowa)
- 3rd place, bronze medalist(s): Carson Kharchla (Ohio State)

The 165-pound competition at the 2023 Big Ten Wrestling Championships in Ann Arbor, Michigan, took place from March 4–5, 2023 at the Crisler Center.

The competition consisted of a triple-elimination tournament to determine the top ten wrestlers of the Big Ten's 165-pound weight class. The top eight wrestlers would qualify for the 2023 NCAA Division I Wrestling Championships.

== Preliminary seeds ==
The Big Ten announced the preliminary seeds on February 27, 2023.

Seed	Wrestler
1	Dean Hamiti (Wisconsin)
2	Cameron Amine (Michigan)
3	Patrick Kennedy (Iowa)
4	Alex Facundo (Penn State)
5	Carson Kharchia (Ohio State)
6	Maxx Mayfield (Northwestern)
7	Caleb Fish (Michigan State)
8	Dan Braunagel (Illinois)
9	Andrew Sparks (Minnesota)
10	Bubba Wilson (Nebraska)
11	Nick South (Indiana)
12	Robert Kanniard (Rutgers)
13	Stoney Buell (Purdue)
14	John Best (Maryland)

== Results ==
Legend

- F — Won by fall
- MF — Won by medical forfeit

=== Championship bracket ===
First Round
1	Dean Hamiti (WIS)
BYE
9	Andrew Sparks (MINN)	2
8	Dan Braunagel (ILL)	0
5	Carson Kharchia (OSU)	20
12	Robert Kanniard (RUT)	5
13	Stoney Buell (PUR)	2
4	Alex Facundo (PSU)	7
3	Patrick Kennedy (IOWA)	22
14	John Best (MD)	8
11	Nick South (IND)	4
6	Maxx Mayfield (NU)	6
7	Caleb Fish (MSU)	6^{F}
10	Bubba Wilson (NEB)	4
BYE
2	Cameron Amine (MICH)

Quarterfinals
1	Dean Hamiti (WIS)	8
9	Andrew Sparks (MINN)	0
5	Carson Kharchia (OSU)	3
4	Alex Facundo (PSU)	1
3	Patrick Kennedy (IOWA)	11
6	Maxx Mayfield (NU)	3
7	Caleb Fish (MSU)	2
2	Cameron Amine (MICH)	4

Semifinals
1	Dean Hamiti (WIS)	14
5	Carson Kharchia (OSU)	2
3	Patrick Kennedy (IOWA)	3
2	Cameron Amine (MICH)	2

1st-Place Match
1	Dean Hamiti (WIS)	9
3	Patrick Kennedy (IOWA)	6

=== Consolation bracket ===
Consolation Round 1
BYE
BYE

Consolation Round 2

Consolation Quarterfinals
7th-Place Match

Consolation Semifinals
5th-Place Match

3rd-Place Match

== Final standings ==
Note: Top-8 wrestlers qualify for the 2023 NCAA Division I Wrestling Championships.

Rank	Wrestler
1st place, gold medalist(s)	Dean Hamiti (Wisconsin)
2nd place, silver medalist(s)	Patrick Kennedy (Iowa)
3rd place, bronze medalist(s)	Carson Kharchia (Ohio State)
4	Cameron Amine (Michigan)
5	Maxx Mayfield (Northwestern)
6	Bubba Wilson (Nebraska)
7	Alex Facundo (Penn State)
8	Dan Braunagel (Illinois)
9	Andrew Sparks (Minnesota)
10	Caleb Fish (Michigan State)
