= 2023 Big Ten Wrestling Championships – 125 lbs =

125 pounds at the 2023 Big Ten Wrestling Championships
- Site: Crisler Center; Ann Arbor, Michigan
- Competitors: 14

Medalists
- 1st place, gold medalist(s): Spencer Lee (Iowa)
- 2nd place, silver medalist(s): Liam Cronin (Nebraska)
- 3rd place, bronze medalist(s): Matt Ramos (Purdue)

The 125-pound competition at the 2023 Big Ten Wrestling Championships in Ann Arbor, Michigan, took place from March 4–5, 2023 at the Crisler Center.

The competition consisted of a triple-elimination tournament to determine the top ten wrestlers of the Big Ten's 125-pound weight class. The top nine wrestlers would qualify for the 2023 NCAA Division I Wrestling Championships.

Spencer Lee of Iowa would win the tournament with two technical falls and an 8–2 decision win in the finals over Liam Cronin of Nebraska.

== Preliminary seeds ==
The Big Ten announced the preliminary seeds on February 27, 2023.

Seed	Wrestler
1	Spencer Lee (Iowa)
2	Liam Cronin (Nebraska)
3	Matt Ramos (Purdue)
4	Eric Barnett (Wisconsin)
5	Patrick McKee (Minnesota)
6	Michael DeAugustino (Northwestern)
7	Braxton Brown (Maryland)
8	Dean Peterson (Rutgers)
9	Jack Medley (Michigan)
10	Gary Steen (Penn State)
11	Tristan Lujan (Michigan State)
12	Jacob Moran (Indiana)
13	Maximo Renteria (Illinois)
14	Andre Gonzales (Ohio State)

== Results ==
Legend

- F — Won by fall
- MF — Won by medical forfeit

=== Championship bracket ===
First Round
1	Spencer Lee (IOWA)
BYE
9	Jack Medley (MICH)	9
8	Dean Peterson (RUT)	0
5	Patrick McKee (MINN)	16
12	Jacob Moran (IND)	6
13	Maximo Renteria (ILL)	0
4	Eric Barnett (WIS)	7^{F}
3	Matt Ramos (PUR)	18
14	Andre Gonzales (OSU)	1
11	Tristan Lujan (MSU)	1
6	Michael DeAugustino (NU)	5
7	Braxton Brown (MD)	14
10	Gary Steen (PSU)	0
BYE
2	Liam Cronin (NEB)

Quarterfinals
1	Spencer Lee (IOWA)	17
9	Jack Medley (MICH)	0
5	Patrick McKee (MINN)	6^{F}
4	Eric Barnett (WIS)	6
3	Matt Ramos (PUR)	1
6	Michael DeAugustino (NU)	9
7	Braxton Brown (MD)	7
2	Liam Cronin (NEB)	11

Semifinals
1	Spencer Lee (IOWA)	20
5	Patrick McKee (MINN)	2
6	Michael DeAugustino (NU)	1
2	Liam Cronin (NEB)	2

1st-Place Match
1	Spencer Lee (IOWA)	8
2	Liam Cronin (NEB)	2

=== Consolation bracket ===
Consolation Round 1
BYE
8	Dean Peterson (RUT)
12	Jacob Moran (IND)	18
13	Maximo Renteria (ILL)	7
14	Andre Gonzales (OSU)	1
11	Tristan Lujan (MSU)	4
10	Gary Steen (PSU)
BYE

Consolation Round 2
8	Dean Peterson (RUT)	8
7	Braxton Brown (MD)	3
12	Jacob Moran (IND)	6
3	Matt Ramos (PUR)	15
11	Tristan Lujan (MSU)	1
4	Eric Barnett (WIS)	4
10	Gary Steen (PSU)	2
9	Jack Medley (MICH)	7

Consolation Quarterfinals
8	Dean Peterson (RUT)	3
3	Matt Ramos (PUR)	6^{F}
4	Eric Barnett (WIS)	6
9	Jack Medley (MICH)	1
7th-Place Match
8	Dean Peterson (RUT)	7
9	Jack Medley (MICH)	1

Consolation Semifinals
3	Matt Ramos (PUR)	2
5	Patrick McKee (MINN)	1
4	Eric Barnett (WIS)	2
6	Michael DeAugustino (NU)	3
5th-Place Match
5	Patrick McKee (MINN)	3
4	Eric Barnett (WIS)	7

3rd-Place Match
3	Matt Ramos (PUR)	MF
6	Michael DeAugustino (NU)

=== 9th-place bracket ===
9th-Place Quarterfinals
10	Gary Steen (PSU)
BYE
11	Tristan Lujan (MSU)	8
14	Andre Gonzales (OSU)	0
13	Maximo Renteria (ILL)	4
12	Jacob Moran (IND)	10
BYE
7	Braxton Brown (MD)

9th-Place Semifinals
10	Gary Steen (PSU)	5
11	Tristan Lujan (MSU)	6
12	Jacob Moran (IND)	0
7	Braxton Brown (MD)	2^{F}

9th-Place Match
11	Tristan Lujan (MSU)	4
7	Braxton Brown (MD)	7

== Final standings ==
Note: Top-9 wrestlers qualify for the 2023 NCAA Division I Wrestling Championships.

Rank	Wrestler
1st place, gold medalist(s)	Spencer Lee (Iowa)
2nd place, silver medalist(s)	Liam Cronin (Nebraska)
3rd place, bronze medalist(s)	Matt Ramos (Purdue)
4	Michael DeAugustino (Northwestern)
5	Eric Barnett (Wisconsin)
6	Patrick McKee (Minnesota)
7	Dean Peterson (Rutgers)
8	Jack Medley (Michigan)
9	Braxton Brown (Maryland)
10	Tristan Lujan (Michigan State)
