= 2024 Big Ten Wrestling Championships – 197 lbs =

197 pounds at the 2024 Big Ten Wrestling Championships
- Site: Xfinity Center; College Park, Maryland
- Competitors: 14

Medalists
- 1st place, gold medalist(s): Aaron Brooks (Penn State)
- 2nd place, silver medalist(s): Zach Glazier (Iowa)
- 3rd place, bronze medalist(s): Silas Allred (Nebraska)

The 197-pound competition at the 2024 Big Ten Wrestling Championships in College Park, Maryland, took place from March 9–10, 2024 at the Xfinity Center.

The competition consisted of a double-elimination tournament to determine the top eight wrestlers of the Big Ten's 197-pound weight class. The top seven wrestlers would qualify for the 2024 NCAA Division I Wrestling Championships.

== Preliminary seeds ==
The Big Ten announced the preliminary seeds on March 4, 2024.

Seed	Wrestler	Team	Year	Record
1	Aaron Brooks	Penn State	Sr.	14–0
2	Jaxon Smith	Maryland	(redshirt) Jr.	15–3
3	Zach Glazier	Iowa	(redshirt) Jr.	21–1
4	Silas Allred	Nebraska	(redshirt) So.	20–6
5	Garrett Joles	Minnesota	(redshirt) Sr.	16–6
6	Luke Geog	Ohio State	(redshirt) Fr.	12–6
7	John Poznanski	Rutgers	(redshirt) So.	12–2
8	Evan Bates	Northwestern	(redshirt) So.	10–10
9	Ben Vanadia	Purdue	(redshirt) So.	11–15
10	Gabe Sollars	Indiana	So.	20–12
11	Kael Wisler	Michigan State	(redshirt) Fr.	22–12
12	Isiah Pettigrew	Illinois	(redshirt) Jr.	6–9
13	Bobby Striggow	Michigan	(redshirt) Sr.	6–9
14	Josh Otto	Wisconsin	(redshirt) Jr.	1–12

== Results ==
Legend

- D – Won by default
- F — Won by fall
- MF — Won by medical forfeit

First Round	Quarterfinals	Semifinals	1st-Place Match
1	Aaron Brooks (PSU)
Bye
1	Aaron Brooks (PSU)	19
8	Evan Bates (NU)	3
9	Ben Vanadia (PUR)	0
8	Evan Bates (NU)	3^{F}
1	Aaron Brooks (PSU)	14
4	Silas Allred (NEB)	2
5	Garrett Joles (MINN)	11
12	Isiah Pettigrew (ILL)	0
5	Garrett Joles (MINN)	4
4	Silas Allred (NEB)	5
13	Bobby Stiggow (MICH)	4
4	Silas Allred (NEB)	19
1	Aaron Brooks (PSU)	19
3	Zach Glazier (IOWA)	3
3	Zach Glazier (IOWA)	14
14	Josh Otto (WIS)	3
3	Zach Glazier (IOWA)	8
6	Luke Geog (OSU)	2
11	Kael Wisler (MSU)	4
6	Luke Geog (OSU)	13
3	Zach Glazier (IOWA)	4
2	Jaxon Smith (MD)	1
7	John Poznanski (RUT)	6
10	Gabe Sollars (IND)	2
7	John Poznanski (RUT)	5
2	Jaxon Smith (MD)	8
Bye
2	Jaxon Smith (MD)
Consolation Round 1	Consolation Round 2	Consolation Quarterfinals	Consolation Semifinals	3rd-Place Match
7	John Poznanski (RUT)	5
4	Silas Allred (NEB)	4^{D}
Bye	9	Ben Vanadia (PUR)	1
7	John Poznanski (RUT)	2	6	Luke Geog (OSU)	0
9	Ben Vanadia (PUR)
6	Luke Geog (OSU)	4
6	Luke Geog (OSU)	18
4	Silas Allred (NEB)	10
12	Isiah Pettigrew (ILL)	11	12	Isiah Pettigrew (ILL)	2
2	Jaxon Smith (MD)	3
13	Bobby Stiggow (MICH)	4
5	Garrett Joles (MINN)	5^{F}
2	Jaxon Smith (MD)	11
14	Josh Otto (WIS)	5	11	Kael Wisler (MSU)	0
5	Garrett Joles (MINN)	8	5	Garrett Joles (MINN)	2
11	Kael Wisler (MSU)	19
8	Evan Bates (NU)	0
8	Evan Bates (NU)	8
10	Gabe Sollars (IND)	10	Gabe Sollars (IND)	3
Bye
7th-Place Match	5th-Place Match
7	John Poznanski (RUT)	15	6	Luke Geog (OSU)
8	Evan Bates (NU)	0	5	Garrett Joles (MINN)	MF

== Final standings ==
Note: Top-7 wrestlers qualify for the 2024 NCAA Division I Wrestling Championships.

Finish	Wrestler	Team	NCAA result
1st place, gold medalist(s)	Aaron Brooks	Penn State	5–0, Champion
2nd place, silver medalist(s)	Zach Glazier	Iowa	1–2, Consolation Round 2
3rd place, bronze medalist(s)	Silas Allred	Nebraska	2–2, Round of 12
4	Jaxon Smith	Maryland	1–2, Consolation Round 2
5	Garrett Joles	Minnesota	1–2, Consolation Round 2
6	Luke Geog	Ohio State	0–2, Consolation Round 1
7	John Poznanski	Rutgers	3–2, Round of 12
8	Evan Bates (Note: Bates was given an at-large selection for the NCAA championships.)	Northwestern	1–2, Consolation Round 2
