= 2023 Big Ten Wrestling Championships – 197 lbs =

197 pounds at the 2023 Big Ten Wrestling Championships
- Site: Crisler Center; Ann Arbor, Michigan
- Competitors: 14

Medalists
- 1st place, gold medalist(s): Silas Allred (Nebraska)
- 2nd place, silver medalist(s): Max Dean (Penn State)
- 3rd place, bronze medalist(s): Jaxon Smith (Maryland)

The 197-pound competition at the 2023 Big Ten Wrestling Championships in Ann Arbor, Michigan, took place from March 4–5, 2023 at the Crisler Center.

The competition consisted of a triple-elimination tournament to determine the top ten wrestlers of the Big Ten's 197-pound weight class. The top nine wrestlers would qualify for the 2023 NCAA Division I Wrestling Championships.

== Preliminary seeds ==
The Big Ten announced the preliminary seeds on February 27, 2023.

Seed	Wrestler
1	Max Dean (Penn State)
2	Silas Allred (Nebraska)
3	Zac Braunagel (Illinois)
4	Cameron Caffey (Michigan State)
5	Jacob Warner (Iowa)
6	Jaxon Smith (Maryland)
7	Gavin Hoffman (Ohio State)
8	Braxton Amos (Wisconsin)
9	Michial Foy (Minnesota)
10	Nick Willham (Indiana)
11	Billy Janzer (Rutgers)
12	Andrew Davison (Northwestern)
13	Brendin Yatooma (Michigan)
14	Hayden Filipovich (Purdue)

== Results ==
Legend

- F — Won by fall
- MF — Won by medical forfeit

=== Championship bracket ===
First Round
1	Max Dean (PSU)
BYE
9	Michial Foy (MINN)	4
8	Braxton Amos (WIS)	2
5	Jacob Warner (IOWA)	6
12	Andrew Davison (NU)	2
13	Brendin Yatooma (MICH)	1
4	Cameron Caffey (MSU)	4
3	Zac Braunagel (ILL)	11
14	Hayden Filipovich (PUR)	3
11	Billy Janzer (RUT)	3
6	Jaxon Smith (MD)	8
7	Gavin Hoffman (OSU)	6
10	Nick Willham (IND)	3
BYE
2	Silas Allred (NEB)

Quarterfinals
1	Max Dean (PSU)	2
9	Michial Foy (MINN)	0
5	Jacob Warner (IOWA)	3
4	Cameron Caffey (MSU)	2
3	Zac Braunagel (ILL)	6
6	Jaxon Smith (MD)	4
7	Gavin Hoffman (OSU)	2
2	Silas Allred (NEB)	6

Semifinals
1	Max Dean (PSU)	3
5	Jacob Warner (IOWA)	1
3	Zac Braunagel (ILL)	3
2	Silas Allred (NEB)	4

1st-Place Match
1	Max Dean (PSU)	3
2	Silas Allred (NEB)	6

=== Consolation bracket ===
Consolation Round 1
BYE
BYE

Consolation Round 2

Consolation Quarterfinals
7th-Place Match

Consolation Semifinals
5th-Place Match

3rd-Place Match

== Final standings ==
Note: Top-9 wrestlers qualify for the 2023 NCAA Division I Wrestling Championships.

Rank	Wrestler
1st place, gold medalist(s)	Silas Allred (Nebraska)
2nd place, silver medalist(s)	Max Dean (Penn State)
3rd place, bronze medalist(s)	Jaxon Smith (Maryland)
4	Zac Braunagel (Illinois)
5	Jacob Warner (Iowa)
6	Cameron Caffey (Michigan State)
7	Braxton Amos (Wisconsin)
8	Michial Foy (Minnesota)
9	Andrew Davison (Northwestern)
10	Nick Willham (Indiana)
