= Antrell Taylor =

American wrestler (born 2004)

Personal information
- Born: March 5, 2004 (age 22) Omaha, Nebraska, U.S.

Sport
- Country: United States
- Sport: Wrestling
- Weight class: 157 lb (71 kg)
- Events: Folkstyle and freestyle
- College team: Nebraska
- Coached by: Mark Manning
Medal record
Men's freestyle wrestling
Representing the United States
U20 Pan American Championships
Gold medal – first place	2023 Santiago	70 kg
Men's collegiate wrestling
Representing the Nebraska Cornhuskers
NCAA Division I Championships
Gold medal – first place	2025 Philadelphia	157 lb
Silver medal – second place	2026 Cleveland	157 lb
- Updated on March 25, 2025

Antrell "Trelly" Taylor (born March 5, 2004) is an American folkstyle and freestyle wrestler who competes at 157 pounds for the Nebraska Cornhuskers.

== Amateur wrestling career ==
=== High school ===
Taylor attended Millard South High School in Omaha, Nebraska. He finished his high school career with a 177–8 record, becoming a three-time NSAA Class A state champion in the process.

=== College ===
On National Signing Day in November 2020, Taylor committed to Mark Manning and the Nebraska Cornhuskers as the No. 6 ranked 160-pounder and the No. 18 overall ranked recruit in the 2022 class.

==== 2022–2023 ====
Taylor began his career redshirting behind Peyton Robb and Nic Stoltenberg at 157 pounds. On November 13, 2022, he made his collegiate debut at the 2022 Journeymen Collegiate Classic, finishing the tournament in fifth place. At the 2022 Navy Classic, Taylor claimed a fourth-place finish. He won the 2022 Doane Open in December and the 2023 Worthington Open in January before making his dual meet debut against Purdue on February 4, 2023. He lost to Kendall Coleman by a 3–6 decision. Taylor finished his redshirt season with a 4–5 (8–5) record. He and Jacob Van Dee shared the honor of the Nebraska Wrestling Redshirt of the Year after the season.

==== 2023–2024 ====
Taylor beat Bubba Wilson, a two-time NCAA qualifier, in Nebraska's wrestle-offs to become the 165-pound starter after gaining weight in the offseason. Taylor started the season with a seven-match win streak and an individual championship at the 2023 Navy Classic before losing to Giano Petrucelli during the 2023 Cliff Keen Invitational. On January 19, 2024, he won his first Big Ten dual match against Blaine Brenner of Minnesota. On February 9, Taylor upset Cameron Amine of Michigan in the first tiebreaker period.

==== 2024–2025 ====
Before the 2024–25 season, Taylor moved back down to 157 pounds. He began the season with individual championships at the 2024 Navy Classic and 2024 Cliff Keen Invitational. On January 26, 2025, he was rested in Nebraska's dual meet against Michigan State due to a lower-body injury.

== NCAA record ==
NCAA Division I record
Res.	Record	Opponent	Score	Date	Event
End of 2025–2026 season (junior year)
End of 2024–2025 season (sophomore year)
2025 NCAA Championships (gold) at 157 lbs
Win	53–19	Joey Blaze	4–2	March 20–22, 2025	2025 NCAA Division I National Championships
Win	52–19	Meyer Shapiro	7–2	March 20–22, 2025	2025 NCAA Division I National Championships
Win	51–19	Matty Bianchi	4–3	March 20–22, 2025	2025 NCAA Division I National Championships
Win	50–19	Jude Swisher	Fall	March 20–22, 2025	2025 NCAA Division I National Championships
Win	49–19	James Conway	TF 20–4	March 20–22, 2025	2025 NCAA Division I National Championships
2025 Big Ten Championships 4th at 157 lbs
Loss	48–19	Joey Blaze	TB–1 2–3	March 8–9, 2025	2025 Big Ten Conference Championships
Win	48–18	Ethen Miller	Fall	March 8–9, 2025	2025 Big Ten Conference Championships
Loss	47–18	Tyler Kasak	Fall	March 8–9, 2025	2025 Big Ten Conference Championships
Win	47–17	Joey Blaze	4–3	March 8–9, 2025	2025 Big Ten Conference Championships
Win	46–17	Braden Stauffenberg	TF 17–2	March 8–9, 2025	2025 Big Ten Conference Championships
Win	45–17	Joey Blaze	4–1	February 23, 2025	Nebraska - Purdue Dual
Win	44–17	Ryan Garvick	TF 27–11	February 16, 2025	Indiana - Nebraska Dual
Win	43–17	Miguel Estrada	4–2	February 7, 2025	Nebraska - Iowa Dual
Win	42–17	Luke Mechler	10–4	January 31, 2025	Wisconsin - Nebraska Dual
Win	41–17	Chase Saldate	Fall	January 24, 2025	Nebraska - Michigan Dual
Loss	40–17	Tyler Kasak	3–9	January 17, 2025	Penn State - Nebraska Dual
Win	40–16	Tommy Askey	SV–1 4–1	January 11, 2025	Minnesota - Nebraska Dual
Loss	39–16	Ryder Downey	SV–1 2–5	January 5, 2025	Nebraska - Northern Iowa Dual
Win		Cael Robb	TF 21–6	December 20, 2024	Nebraska-Kearney - Nebraska Dual
2024 Cliff Keen Invitational (gold) at 157 lbs
Win	39–15	Ryder Downey	4–3	December 6–7, 2024	2024 Cliff Keen Las Vagas Invitational
Win	38–15	Paddy Gallagher	SV–1 4–1	December 6–7, 2024	2024 Cliff Keen Las Vagas Invitational
Win	37–15	Chase Saldate	15–11	December 6–7, 2024	2024 Cliff Keen Las Vagas Invitational
Win	36–15	Colton Washleski	Fall	December 6–7, 2024	2024 Cliff Keen Las Vagas Invitational
Win	35–15	Michael Kilic	MD 14–4	December 6–7, 2024	2024 Cliff Keen Las Vagas Invitational
2024 Navy Classic (gold) at 157 lbs
Win	34–15	Ethan Stiles	SV–1 10–5	November 23, 2024	2024 Navy Classic
Win	33–15	Cade Wirnsberger	TF 20–5	November 23, 2024	2024 Navy Classic
Win	32–15	Tyler Badgett	TF 19–3	November 23, 2024	2024 Navy Classic
Win	31–15	Doug Terry	Fall	November 23, 2024	2024 Navy Classic
Win	30–15	Sonny Santiago	4–2	November 15, 2024	Nebraska - North Carolina Dual
Win	29–15	Seth Larson	Fall	November 15, 2024	Nebraska - Campbell Dual
Win	28–15	Ryker Fullmer	TF 20–4	November 8, 2024	Utah Valley - Nebraska Dual
Start of 2024–2025 season (sophomore year)
End of 2023–2024 season (freshman year)
2024 NCAA Championships 8th at 165 lbs
Loss	27–15	Peyton Hall	1–2	March 21–23, 2024	2024 NCAA Division I National Championships
Loss	27–14	Izzak Olejnik	0–2	March 21–23, 2024	2024 NCAA Division I National Championships
Win	27–13	Giano Petrucelli	11–6	March 21–23, 2024	2024 NCAA Division I National Championships
Loss	26–13	Keegan O'Toole	Fall	March 21–23, 2024	2024 NCAA Division I National Championships
Win	26–12	Peyton Hall	11–9	March 21–23, 2024	2024 NCAA Division I National Championships
Win	25–12	Holden Heller	MD 11–0	March 21–23, 2024	2024 NCAA Division I National Championships
2024 Big Ten Championships 5th at 165 lbs
Win	24–12	Chris Moore	4–1	March 9–10, 2024	2024 Big Ten Conference Championships
Loss	23–12	Cameron Amine	TB–1 2–3	March 9–10, 2024	2024 Big Ten Conference Championships
Loss	23–11	Dean Hamiti	Fall	March 9–10, 2024	2024 Big Ten Conference Championships
Win	23–10	Caleb Fish	SV–1 8–5	March 9–10, 2024	2024 Big Ten Conference Championships
Win	22–10	Maxx Mayfield	7–2	March 9–10, 2024	2024 Big Ten Conference Championships
Win	21–10	Chance McLane	11–5	February 25, 2024	Nebraska - Arizona State Dual
Loss	20–10	Mitchell Mesenbrink	5–9	February 18, 2024	Nebraska - Penn State Dual
Win	20–9	Cameron Amine	TB–1 3–2	February 9, 2024	Michigan - Nebraska Dual
Win	19–9	Chris Moore	SV–1 4–1	February 4, 2024	Illinois - Nebraska Dual
Loss	18–9	Dean Hamiti	2–7	January 28, 2024	Nebraska - Wisconsin Dual
Win	18–8	Maxx Mayfield	SV–1 4–1	January 26, 2024	Nebraska - Northwestern Dual
Win	17–8	Stoney Buell	MD 14–6	January 21, 2024	Purdue - Nebraska Dual
Win	16–8	Blaine Brenner	8–2	January 19, 2024	Nebraska - Minnesota Dual
Loss	15–8	Michael Caliendo	3–8	January 12, 2024	Iowa - Nebraska Dual
Win	15–7	Robert Weston	6–3	January 6, 2024	Northern Iowa - Nebraska Dual
Win	14–7	Brett McIntosh	TF 22–5	January 6, 2024	Wyoming - Nebraska Dual
Win	13–7	Tanner Cook	7–1	December 16, 2023	South Dakota State - Nebraska Dual
2023 Cliff Keen Invitational DNP at 165 lbs
Loss	12–7	Stoney Buell	MD 1–12	December 1–2, 2023	2023 Cliff Keen Las Vegas Invitational
Win	12–6	Evan Yant	MD 11–3	December 1–2, 2023	2023 Cliff Keen Las Vegas Invitational
Loss	11–6	Giano Petrucelli	9–12	December 1–2, 2023	2023 Cliff Keen Las Vegas Invitational
Win	11–5	Connor Gaynor	8–5	December 1–2, 2023	2023 Cliff Keen Las Vegas Invitational
2023 Navy Classic (gold) at 165 lbs
Win	10–5	Giano Petrucelli	10–3	November 18, 2023	2023 Navy Classic
Win	9–5	Garrett Thompson	10–3	November 18, 2023	2023 Navy Classic
Win	8–5	Aaron Ferguson	MD 11–1	November 18, 2023	2023 Navy Classic
Win	7–5	Daniel Patten	TF 17–2	November 18, 2023	2023 Navy Classic
Win	6–5	Domonic Baker	MD 22–10	November 10, 2023	Campbell - Nebraska Dual
Win	5–5	Brendan Howes	Fall	November 4, 2023	Nebraska - North Dakota State Dual
Start of 2023–2024 season (freshman year)
End of 2022–2023 season (redshirt year)
Loss	4–5	Kendall Coleman	3–6	February 4, 2023	Nebraska - Purdue Dual
2023 Worthington Open (gold) at 157 lbs
Win	4–4	Blaine Brenner	10–6	January 21, 2023	2023 Worthington Open
Win		Payton Handevidt	6–2	January 21, 2023	2023 Worthington Open
Win		Abraham Dirkx	MD 17–7	January 21, 2023	2023 Worthington Open
Win		Jett Thoreson	MD 14–6	January 21, 2023	2023 Worthington Open
2022 Doane Open (gold) at 157 lbs
Win		Peyten Kellar	MFOR	December 3, 2022	2022 Doane Conner/Oppenheim Open
Win		Tyson Johnson	TF 21–5	December 3, 2022	2022 Doane Conner/Oppenheim Open
Win		Jovon Mitchell	MFOR	December 3, 2022	2022 Doane Conner/Oppenheim Open
2022 Navy Classic 4th at 157 lbs
Loss	3–4	Peyten Kellar	Fall	November 19, 2022	2022 Navy Classic
Loss	3–3	Chase Saldate	Fall	November 19, 2022	2022 Navy Classic
Win	3–2	Nick Delp	6–5	November 19, 2022	2022 Navy Classic
Win	2–2	Andrew Cerniglia	10–7	November 19, 2022	2022 Navy Classic
2022 Journeymen Classic 5th at 157 lbs
Win	1–2	Cael Berg	5–3	November 13, 2022	2022 Journeymen Collegiate Classic
Loss	0–2	Anthony Artalona	Fall	November 13, 2022	2022 Journeymen Collegiate Classic
Loss	0–1	Alejandro Herrera-Rondon	0–6	November 13, 2022	2022 Journeymen Collegiate Classic
Start of 2022–2023 season (redshirt year)

=== Stats ===
Season	Year	School	Rank	Weight class	Record	Win	Bonus
2026	Junior	University of Nebraska–Lincoln	--	157	0–0	0.0%	0.0%
2025	Sophomore	University of Nebraska–Lincoln	#7 (1st)	157	26–4	86.67%	45.16%
2024	Freshman	University of Nebraska–Lincoln	#10 (8th)	165	23–10	69.70%	24.24%
2023	Redshirt	University of Nebraska–Lincoln	#19	157	4–5	44.44%	23.08%
Career					53–19	73.61%	32.82%

== Freestyle record ==
Senior freestyle matches
Res.	Record	Opponent	Score	Date	Event	Location
2025 US World Team Trials DNP at 70 kg
Loss	1-2	(United States) Brayton Lee	2-5	May 16–17, 2025	2025 US World Team Trials Challenge	(United States) Louisville, Kentucky
Loss	1-1	(United States) P.J. Duke	6-9	May 16–17, 2025	2025 US World Team Trials Challenge	(United States) Louisville, Kentucky
Win	1-0	(United States) Jackson Arrington	TF 10-0	May 16–17, 2025	2025 US World Team Trials Challenge	(United States) Louisville, Kentucky
