= Aaron Brooks (wrestler) =

American freestyle wrestler (born 2000)

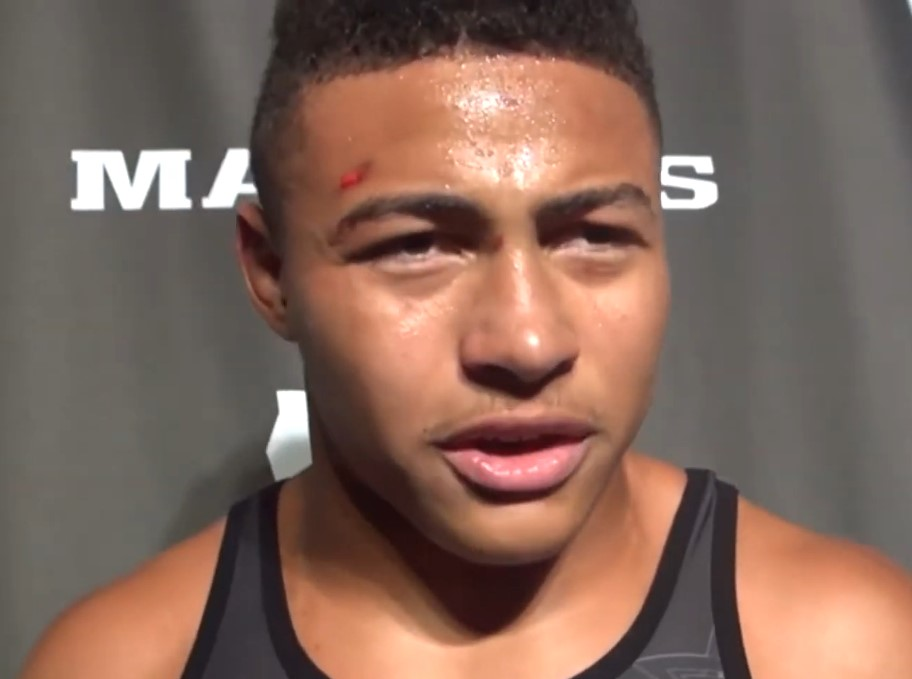
- Brooks in 2017

Personal information
- Full name: Aaron Marquel Brooks
- Born: June 15, 2000 (age 26) Hagerstown, Maryland, U.S.

Sport
- Country: United States
- Sport: Wrestling
- Weight class: 86 kg (190 lb)
- Events: Freestyle and Folkstyle
- College team: Penn State
- Club: Nittany Lion Wrestling Club; Titan Mercury Wrestling Club
- Coached by: Cael Sanderson
Medal record
Men's freestyle wrestling
Representing United States
Olympic Games
Bronze medal – third place	2024 Paris	86 kg
U23 World Championships
Gold medal – first place	2023 Tirana	86 kg
US National Championships
Gold medal – first place	2023 Las Vegas	86 kg
Junior World Championships
Silver medal – second place	2018 Trnava	79 kg
Cadet World Championships
Gold medal – first place	2017 Athens	76 kg
Men's collegiate wrestling
Representing the Penn State Nittany Lions
NCAA Division I Championships
Gold medal – first place	2021 St. Louis	184 lb
Gold medal – first place	2022 Detroit	184 lb
Gold medal – first place	2023 Tulsa	184 lb
Gold medal – first place	2024 Kansas City	197 lb
Big Ten Championships
Gold medal – first place	2020 Piscataway	184 lb
Gold medal – first place	2021 State College	184 lb
Gold medal – first place	2023 Ann Arbor	184 lb
Gold medal – first place	2024 College Park	197 lb
Silver medal – second place	2022 Lincoln	184 lb

Aaron Marquel Brooks OLY (born June 15, 2000) is an American freestyle and folkstyle wrestler who competes at 86 kilograms. He earned a bronze medal while representing the United States at the 2024 Summer Olympics, and is also a U23 World champion and US National champion.

In collegiate wrestling, Brooks was the seventh four-time NCAA Division I national champion in history, and was also a four-time Big Ten Conference champion out of the Pennsylvania State University.

Brooks is currently serving a two-year ban set to expire in June 2027 for an anti-doping rule violation.

== Career ==
=== High school ===
Brooks was born in Hagerstown, Maryland, and attended North Hagerstown High School. During his high school years, Brooks was a four-time NHSCA National champion and a four-time MPSSAA state champion, with a 163–2 record in the state of Maryland. In freestyle, Brooks became a U17 World champion before his senior year. The top-recruit at 182 pounds, Brooks committed to wrestle for the Penn State Nittany Lions in early 2018.

After his senior year, Brooks decided to spend a grayshirt year at the US Olympic Training Center.

In August 2018, Brooks earned a silver medal from the U20 World Championships. In January 2019, he claimed the Dave Schultz Memorial International title, making his senior level debut. In August 2019, after making the US World Team, Brooks was eliminated in the first-round at the U20 World Championships by eventual World medalist Abubakr Abakarov.

=== The Pennsylvania State University ===
==== 2019–2020 ====
Brooks wore a redshirt for his first appearance, the Mat Town Open, which he won. However, his redshirt was then burned for him to rack up a 9–1 dual meet record during regular season.

In December, Brooks briefly switched to freestyle to compete at the US National Championships, placing sixth though failing to qualify for the US Olympic Team Trials.

Back to folkstyle, Brooks won his first Big Ten Conference title, avenging his lone season loss to Taylor Venz from Nebraska in the semifinals. The third seed for the NCAA tournament, Brooks was unable to compete as the event was cancelled due to the COVID-19 pandemic. After the season, he was named the Big Ten Freshman of the Year.

==== 2020–2021 ====
After a 6–0 dual meet stint during his sophomore campaign, Brooks became a two-time Big Ten Conference champion in the post-season. At the NCAA tournament, Brooks became an NCAA Division I National champion after wins over fourth-seeded Parker Keckeisen and second-seeded Trent Hidlay in the semifinals and finals, respectively. This result qualified Brooks for the US Olympic Team Trials, which took place a month after, in April.

At the US Olympic Trials, Brooks defeated two-time All-Americans Nate Jackson and Sammy Brooks, but fell to two-time NCAA champion Zahid Valencia and US National champion Pat Downey.

==== 2021–2022 ====
Entering his junior year, Brooks amassed an undefeated 14–0 dual meet record during regular season. After making his third-straight Big Ten Conference final, Brooks suffered an upset loss to Olympic bronze medalist Myles Amine, whom he had defeated during regular season. At the NCAA tournament, Brooks cruised to the finals after defeating his 2021 NCAA finals foe Trent Hidlay in the semifinals, and was then able to pull off the rubber-match win over Amine in the finals to defend his title and become a two-time NCAA national champion.

==== 2022–2023 ====
Entering his senior year, Brooks compiled a 9–1 dual meet record during regular season, suffering a lone setback to Iowa State's Marcus Coleman. At the Big Ten tournament, Brooks made his fourth finale and claimed his third title with three wins, all of them including bonus points. Brooks, the third seed, was able to claim his third NCAA National championship, with yet another semifinal win over second-seeded Trent Hidlay and top-seeded Parker Keckeisen in the finals.

Fresh as a three-time NCAA champion, Brooks switched to freestyle to compete at the US Open National Championships in April. After cruising to the semifinals, he defeated US National champion and two-time U20 World champion Mark Hall on points to make the finals, where he avenged losses from 2019 and 2021 to US National champion and two-time NCAA champion Zahid Valencia to claim the championship and earn a berth for Final X.

In June, Brooks competed against teammate and three-time Olympic and World champion David Taylor for the US World Team spot at Final X Newark, where he lost two matches to none in a best-of-three format to claim runner-up honors. As a result, Brooks earned the right to represent the United States at the U23 World Championships in October.

In October, Brooks became the U23 World champion at 86 kilograms, facing competition such as defending U23 World champion Tatsuya Shirai from Japan, U20 European champion Arslan Bagaev from Russia, returning U23 World medalist Ivan Ichizli from Moldova and U20 World medalist İsmail Küçüksolak from Turkey.

==== 2023–2024 ====
Brooks then opted to return to Penn State for a fifth and final season, as the NCAA offered an extra year of eligibility to any student athlete rostered during the COVID-19 shortened 2020–2021 season and was again a National Champion at 197 lbs. Now up at 197 pounds, Brooks added a Journeymen Classic title to his resume and racked up an 11–0 dual meet record during regular season.

In the postseason, Brooks repeated his 2023 Big Ten title run, handling his three opponents bonus-points losses to claim the championship. Following the tournament, he was named the Big Ten Wrestler of the Year. Brooks then swept through the NCAA Tournament field, posting two technical falls and two falls before defeating Trent Hidlay 6–1 in the NCAA Final. With his victory, Brooks became just the seventh wrestler to win four NCAA titles and was named the tournament's Most Outstanding Wrestler. On April 1, 2024, Brooks was awarded the Hodge Trophy as the nation's top collegiate wrestler.

=== Post-collegiate career ===
==== 2024 ====
In April, Brooks competed at the US Olympic Team Trials, where after defeating multiple-time NCAA champions Alex Dieringer and Zahid Valencia, as well as Connor Mirasola, he advanced to the best-of-three finals, where he would rematch teammate and Olympic and two-time World champion David Taylor. He knocked off Taylor two times in a row to upset him and earn the right to represent the United States at the 2024 Summer Olympics in August, as a US Olympic Team Member.

In August, Brooks made his Olympic debut at the 2024 Summer Olympics in Paris. On the first day, Brooks defeated two-time World medalist Azamat Dauletbekov from Kazakhstan and U20 World champion Hayato Ishiguro from Japan to make the semifinals, where he fell to eventual gold medalist Magomed Ramazanov from Bulgaria, after losing his lead in the closing seconds of the bout. The next day, Brooks contested the bronze-medal match, defeating Javrail Shapiev from Uzbekistan to earn bronze.

In February 2026, Brooks was issued with a two-year ban backdated to June 2025 for an anti-doping rule violation after testing positive for unintentional use of DHEA. DHEA is an over-the-counter supplement but is banned by USADA. Brooks purchased it and began taking it five days after being released from hospital with double pneumonia, discovering roughly two weeks later that it was a prohibited substance.

== Freestyle record ==
Senior Freestyle Matches
Res.	Record	Opponent	Score	Date	Event	Location
2024 Summer Olympics (bronze) at 86 kg
Win	25–8	(Uzbekistan) Javrail Shapiev	5–0	August 9, 2024	2024 Summer Olympics	Paris, France
Loss	24–8	(Bulgaria) Magomed Ramazanov	3–4	August 8, 2024	2024 Summer Olympics	Paris, France
Win	24–7	(Japan) Hayato Ishiguro	TF 11–1	August 8, 2024	2024 Summer Olympics	Paris, France
Win	23–7	(Kazakhstan) Azamat Dauletbekov	4–3	August 8, 2024	2024 Summer Olympics	Paris, France
2024 US Olympic Team Trials (gold) at 86 kg
Win	22–7	(United States) David Taylor	3–1	April 20, 2024	2024 US Olympic Team Trials	(United States) State College, Pennsylvania
Win	21–7	(United States) David Taylor	4–1	April 20, 2024	2024 US Olympic Team Trials	(United States) State College, Pennsylvania
Win	20–7	(United States) Zahid Valencia	7–6	April 19, 2024	2024 US Olympic Team Trials	(United States) State College, Pennsylvania
Win	19–7	(United States) Alex Dieringer	8–4	April 19, 2024	2024 US Olympic Team Trials	(United States) State College, Pennsylvania
Win	18–7	(United States) Connor Mirasola	11–5	April 19, 2024	2024 US Olympic Team Trials	(United States) State College, Pennsylvania
2023 U23 World Championships (gold) at 86 kg
Win	17–7	(Japan) Tatsuya Shirai	TF 10–0	October 23–24, 2023	2023 U23 World Championships	Tirana, Albania
Win	16–7	(Russia) Arslan Bagaev	5–4	October 23–24, 2023	2023 U23 World Championships	Tirana, Albania
Win	15–7	(Moldova) Ivan Ichizli	7–0	October 23–24, 2023	2023 U23 World Championships	Tirana, Albania
Win	14–7	(Canada) Owen Martin	TF 10–0	October 23–24, 2023	2023 U23 World Championships	Tirana, Albania
Win	13–7	(Turkey) İsmail Küçüksolak	6–1	October 23–24, 2023	2023 U23 World Championships	Tirana, Albania
2023 US World Team Trials (silver) at 86 kg
Loss	12–7	(United States) David Taylor	4–5	June 10, 2023	2023 Final X Newark	(United States) Newark, New Jersey
Loss	12–6	(United States) David Taylor	0–6	June 10, 2023	2023 Final X Newark	(United States) Newark, New Jersey
2023 US Open (gold) at 86 kg
Win	12–5	(United States) Zahid Valencia	10–6	April 26–30, 2023	2023 US Open National Championships	(United States) Las Vegas, Nevada
Win	11–5	(United States) Mark Hall	6–1	April 26–30, 2023	2023 US Open National Championships	(United States) Las Vegas, Nevada
Win	10–5	(United States) Owen Webster	TF 11–0	April 26–30, 2023	2023 US Open National Championships	(United States) Las Vegas, Nevada
Win	9–5	(United States) Hudson Stewart	VCA (9–0)	April 26–30, 2023	2023 US Open National Championships	(United States) Las Vegas, Nevada
Win	8–5	(United States) Dylan Fishback	TF 10–0	April 26–30, 2023	2023 US Open National Championships	(United States) Las Vegas, Nevada
2020 US Olympic Team Trials DNP at 86 kg
Loss	7–5	(United States) Pat Downey	TF 0–11	April 2–3, 2021	2020 US Olympic Team Trials	(United States) Fort Worth, Texas
Win	7–4	(United States) Sammy Brooks	6–3	April 2–3, 2021	2020 US Olympic Team Trials	(United States) Fort Worth, Texas
Loss	6–4	(United States) Zahid Valencia	3–6	April 2–3, 2021	2020 US Olympic Team Trials	(United States) Fort Worth, Texas
Win	6–3	(United States) Nate Jackson	3–0	April 2–3, 2021	2020 US Olympic Team Trials	(United States) Fort Worth, Texas
2019 US Nationals 6th at 86 kg
Loss	5–3	(United States) Sammy Brooks	TF 0–10	December 20–22, 2019	2019 US National Championships	(United States) Fort Worth, Texas
Loss	5–2	(United States) Brett Pfarr	5–5	December 20–22, 2019	2019 US National Championships	(United States) Fort Worth, Texas
Loss	5–1	(United States) Zahid Valencia	0–6	December 20–22, 2019	2019 US National Championships	(United States) Fort Worth, Texas
Win	5–0	(United States) Sammy Brooks	15–9	December 20–22, 2019	2019 US National Championships	(United States) Fort Worth, Texas
Win	4–0	(United States) Max Dean	10–7	December 20–22, 2019	2019 US National Championships	(United States) Fort Worth, Texas
Win	3–0	(United States) Matthew Alejandro	TF 10–0	December 20–22, 2019	2019 US National Championships	(United States) Fort Worth, Texas
2019 Dave Schultz Memorial International (gold) at 79 kg
Win	2–0	(United States) Nate Jackson	TF 13–0	January 24–26, 2019	2019 Dave Schultz Memorial International	(United States) Colorado Springs, Colorado
Win	1–0	(United States) Stacey Davis	Fall	January 24–26, 2019	2019 Dave Schultz Memorial International	(United States) Colorado Springs, Colorado

== NCAA record ==
NCAA Division I Record
Res.	Record	Opponent	Score	Date	Event
End of 2023-24 Season (5th Year Senior)
2024 NCAA Championships (gold) at 197 lbs
Win	89–3	Trent Hidlay	6–1	March 21–23, 2024	2024 NCAA Division 1 National Championships
Win	88-3	Rocky Elam	TF 17–2	March 21–23, 2024	2024 NCAA Division 1 National Championships
Win	87–3	Stephen Buchanan	Fall	March 21–23, 2024	2024 NCAA Division 1 National Championships
Win	86–3	Joseph Novak	Fall	March 21–23, 2024	2024 NCAA Division 1 National Championships
Win	85–3	Evan Bates	TF 19–4	March 21–23, 2024	2024 NCAA Division 1 National Championships
2024 Big Ten Conference (gold) at 197 lbs
Win	84–3	Zach Glazier	TF 19–3	March 9–10, 2024	2024 Big Ten Conference Championships
Win	83-3	Silas Allred	14–2	March 9–10, 2024	2024 Big Ten Conference Championships
Win	82–3	Evan Bates	TF 19–3	March 9–10, 2024	2024 Big Ten Conference Championships
Win	81–3	Jack Kilner	TF 19–4	February 25, 2024	Penn State - Edinboro Dual
Win	80–3	Silas Allred	17–4	February 18, 2024	Penn State- Nebraska Dual
Win	79–3	Michael Toranzo	Fall	February 12, 2024	Penn State - Rutgers Dual
Win	78–3	Zach Glazier	5–1	February 9, 2024	Penn State - Iowa Dual
Win	77–3	Luke Geog	TF 22–6	February 2, 2024	Penn State - Ohio State Dual
Win	76–3	Jaxon Smith	13–4	January 28, 2024	Penn State - Maryland Dual
Win	75–3	Kael Wisler	TF 21–6	January 21, 2024	Penn State - Michigan State Dual
Win	74–3	Bobby Striggow	TF 20–5	January 19, 2024	Penn State - Michigan Dual
Win	73–3	Gabe Sollars	TF 19–4	January 14, 2024	Penn State - Indiana Dual
Win	72–3	Justin Rademacher	TF 19–4	January 5, 2024	Penn State - Oregon State Dual
Win	71–3	Nikolas Miller	Fall	December 10, 2023	Penn State - Hofstra Dual
Win	70–3	Martin Cosgrove	Fall	November 12, 2023	Journeyman Collegiate Classic
Win	69-3	John Crawford	TF 19–3	November 12, 2023	Journeyman Collegiate Classic
Win	68–3	Jacob Meissner	Fall	November 12, 2023	Journeyman Collegiate Classic
Start of 2023-2024 Season (5th Year Senior)
End of 2022-2023 Season (Senior year)
2023 NCAA Championships (gold) at 184 lbs
Win	67–3	Parker Keckeisen	7–2	March 16–18, 2023	2023 NCAA Division I National Championships
Win	66-3	Trent Hidlay	6-3	March 16–18, 2023	2023 NCAA Division I National Championships
Win	65-3	Kaleb Romero	4-1	March 16–18, 2023	2023 NCAA Division I National Championships
Win	64-3	Will Feldkamp	Fall	March 16–18, 2023	2023 NCAA Division I National Championships
Win	63-3	Matt Waddell	13-4	March 16–18, 2023	2023 NCAA Division I National Championships
2023 Big Ten Conference (gold) at 184 lbs
Win	62-3	Kaleb Romero	12–2	March 4–5, 2023	2023 Big Ten Conference Championships
Win	61-3	Matt Finesilver	18–6	March 4–5, 2023	2023 Big Ten Conference Championships
Win	60–3	Brian Soldano	TF 18–2	March 4–5, 2023	2023 Big Ten Conference Championships
Win	59–3	Brian Soldano	TF 18-3	February 10, 2023	Penn State - Rutgers Dual
Win	58–3	Kalem Romero	3-2	February 3, 2023	Penn State - Ohio State Dual
Win	57–3	Drake Rhodes	TF 22-7	January 27, 2023	Penn State - Iowa Dual
Win	56–3	Matt Finesilver	14-4	January 20, 2023	Penn State - Michigan Dual
Win	55–3	Tyler Dow	TF 16-0	January 6, 2023	Penn State - Wisconsin Dual
Loss	54–3	Marcus Coleman	7-9	December 20, 2022	Penn State - Iowa State Dual
Win	54–2	Gavin Kane	Fall	December 19, 2022	Penn State - North Carolina Dual
Win	53–2	Ben Cushman	Fall	December 19, 2022	Penn State - Central Michigan Dual
Win	52–2	Tate Samuelson	8-2	December 4, 2022	Penn State - Lehigh Dual
Win	51–2	Colin Fegley	TF 24-9	November 11, 2022	Penn State - Lock Haven Dual
Start of 2022-2023 Season (Senior year)
End of 2021-2022 Season (Junior year)
2022 NCAA Championships (gold) at 184 lbs
Win	50–2	Myles Amine	5-3	March 18–20, 2022	2022 NCAA Division I National Championships
Win	49–2	Trent Hidlay	6–4(sv)	March 18–20, 2022	2022 NCAA Division I National Championships
Win	48–2	Kaleb Romero	13-2	March 18–20, 2022	2022 NCAA Division I National Championships
Win	47–2	Hunter Bolen	9-1	March 18–20, 2022	2022 NCAA Division I National Championships
Win	46–2	A.J. Burkhart	21-7	March 18–20, 2022	2022 NCAA Division I National Championships
2022 Big Ten Conference (silver) at 184 lbs
Loss	45–2	Myles Amine	4-6 (sv)	March 5–6, 2022	2022 Big Ten Conference Championships
Win	45–1	Taylor Venz	7-2	March 5–6, 2022	2022 Big Ten Conference Championships
Win	44–1	Kyle Cochran	Fall	March 5–6, 2022	2022 Big Ten Conference Championships
Win	43–1	Taylor Venz	23-8	January 16, 2022	Penn State - Nebraska Dual
Win	42–1	Rocky Jordan	Fall	February 4, 2022	Penn State - Ohio State Dual
Win	41–1	Abe Assad	8-3	January 28, 2022	Penn State - Iowa Dual
Win	40–1	Layne Malczewski	4-0	January 23, 2022	Penn State - Michigan State Dual
Win	39–1	Myles Amine	3-1	January 21, 2022	Penn State - Michigan Dual
Win	38–1	John Poznanski	10-2	January 16, 2022	Penn State - Rutgers Dual
Win	37–1	D.J. Washington	13-4	January 9, 2022	Penn State - Indiana Dual
Win	36–1	Kyle Cochran	19-7	January 7, 2022	Penn State - Maryland Dual
Win	35–1	Josh Nummer	Fall	December 21, 2021	Penn State - Arizona State Dual
Win	34–1	Jonathan Loew	15-3	December 20, 2021	Penn State - Cornell Dual
Win	33–1	Parker Keckeisen	3-2	December 20, 2021	Penn State - Northern Iowa Dual
Win	32–1	Brad Laughlin	21-7	November 18, 2021	Penn State - Army Dual
Win	31–1	Jackson McKinney	Fall	November 13, 2021	Penn State - Oregon State Dual
Win	30–1	Joe Accousti	23-8	November 13, 2021	Penn State - Sacred Heart Dual
Start of 2021-2022 Season (Junior year)
End of 2020-2021 Season (Sophomore year)
2021 NCAA Championships (gold) at 184 lbs
Win	29–1	Trent Hidlay	3–2	March 18–20, 2021	2021 NCAA Division I National Championships
Win	28–1	Parker Keckeisen	6–4	March 18–20, 2021	2021 NCAA Division I National Championships
Win	27–1	Taylor Venz	9–4	March 18–20, 2021	2021 NCAA Division I National Championships
Win	26–1	Owen Webster	5–0	March 18–20, 2021	2021 NCAA Division I National Championships
Win	25–1	Jha'quan Anderson	TF 17–1	March 18–20, 2021	2021 NCAA Division I National Championships
2021 Big Ten Conference (gold) at 184 lbs
Win	24–1	Taylor Venz	10–5	March 6–7, 2021	2021 Big Ten Conference Championships
Win	23–1	John Poznanski	MD 10–2	March 6–7, 2021	2021 Big Ten Conference Championships
Win	22–1	Nelson Brands	14–8	March 6–7, 2021	2021 Big Ten Conference Championships
Win	21–1	Kyle Cochran	MD 18–5	February 21, 2021	Maryland - Penn State Dual
Win	20–1	Rocky Jordan	MD 13–4	February 19, 2021	Penn State - Ohio State Dual
Win	19–1	Jaden Bullock	10–5	February 14, 2021	Penn State - Michigan Dual
Win	18–1	Chris Weiler	MD 12–3	February 2, 2021	Penn State - Northwestern Dual
Win	17–1	Jack Jessen	TF 21–6	January 30, 2021	Penn State - Northwestern Dual
Win	16–1	Drayton Harris	MD 18–5	January 30, 2021	American - Penn State Dual
Start of 2020-2021 Season (Sophomore year)
End of 2019-2020 Season (Freshman year)
2020 NCAA's Cancelled (COVID-19)
2020 Big Ten Conference (gold) at 184 lbs
Win	15–1	Cameron Caffey	3–2	March 7–8, 2020	2020 Big Ten Conference Championships
Win	14–1	Taylor Venz	Fall	March 7–8, 2020	2020 Big Ten Conference Championships
Win	13–1	Owen Webster	MD 15–4	March 7–8, 2020	2020 Big Ten Conference Championships
Win	12–1	Tanner Harvey	8–5	February 23, 2020	American - Penn State Dual
Win	11–1	Rocky Jordan	MD 15–4	February 15, 2020	Ohio State - Penn State Dual
Win	10–1	Owen Webster	MD 13–3	February 9, 2020	Penn State - Minnesota Dual
Win	9–1	Johnny Sebastian	3–2	February 7, 2020	Penn State - Wisconsin Dual
Win	8–1	Abe Assad	7–3	January 31, 2020	Penn State - Iowa Dual
Loss	7–1	Taylor Venz	5–9	January 24, 2020	Penn State - Nebraska Dual
Win	7–0	Billy Janzer	Fall	January 19, 2020	Rutgers - Penn State Dual
Win	6–0	Zach Braunagel	9–4	January 10, 2020	Illinois - Penn State Dual
Win	5–0	Jesse Quatse	TF 19–4	December 8, 2019	Pennsylvania - Penn State Dual
Win	4–0	Chris Weiller	10–5	December 6, 2019	Penn State - Lehigh Dual
2019 Mat-Town Open I (gold) at 184 lbs
Win	3–0	Kyle Myers	Fall	December 1, 2019	2019 Mat-Town Open I
Win	2–0	Jared McGill	11–5	December 1, 2019	2019 Mat-Town Open I
Win	1–0	Kyle Inlander	7–4	December 1, 2019	2019 Mat-Town Open I
Start of 2019-2020 Season (Freshman year)

=== Stats ===
Season	Year	School	Rank	Weigh Class	Record	Win	Bonus
2024	5th Year Senior	Pennsylvania State University	#1	197	22-0	100.00%	90.91%
2023	Senior	Pennsylvania State University	#3	184	17-1	94.4%	66.66%
2022	Junior	Pennsylvania State University	#1	184	21-1	95.45%	63.64%
2021	Sophomore	Pennsylvania State University	#1	184	14–0	100.00%	50.00%
2020	Freshman	Pennsylvania State University	#3 (Cancelled COVID-19)	184	15–1	93.75%	43.75%
Career					89-3	96.74%	65.22%

== Personal life ==
Brooks is Christian.
