= 2025 NCAA Division I Men's Wrestling Championships =

American collegiate wrestling tournament

- Season: 2024–25
- Teams: 66
- Format: Double-elimination
- Finals site: Wells Fargo Center; Philadelphia, Pennsylvania
- Champions: Penn State (13th title)
- Runner-up: Nebraska
- Winning coach: Cael Sanderson (12th title)
- MOW: Carter Starocci (Penn State)
- Attendance: 18,085 (session I); 18,088 (session II); 18,091 (session III); 18,099 (session IV); 18,806 (session V); 18,826 (session VI)
- Television: ESPN; ESPN2; ESPNU; ESPN+

The 2025 NCAA Division I Men's Wrestling Championships was the 94th annual NCAA Division I Men's Wrestling Championship that took place from March 20–22, 2025 in Philadelphia at the Wells Fargo Center (since renamed Xfinity Mobile Arena).

Penn State won their 13th national team title and their 12th under head coach Cael Sanderson after becoming the second team in NCAA Division I history to have 10 All-Americans in a single tournament. The Nittany Lions also broke their 2024 tournament record for most points scored in a single tournament with 177.0 points.

Penn State, Nebraska, and Oklahoma State all had two wrestlers win individual championships with Penn State's Mitchell Mesenbrink and Carter Starocci, Nebraska's Ridge Lovett and Antrell Taylor, and Oklahoma State's Dean Hamiti Jr. and Wyatt Hendrickson all winning titles. Starocci became the first five-time NCAA Division I champion. Nebraska finished in a program-best second place, getting their first champion since 2011 and having two national champions for the first time since 1984. Oklahoma State had their first champion since 2021 and it was first time the team had multiple champions since 2016.

== Qualification ==
=== Pre-allocations ===
The NCAA announced qualifying tournament pre-allocations on February 27, 2025.

Conference	125	133	141	149	157	165	174	184	197	285	Total
ACC	4	3	4	4	3	5	4	3	3	5	38
Big 12	7	6	7	6	7	7	6	7	4	4	61
Big Ten	9	10	7	8	8	9	8	8	10	10	87
EIWA	2	1	3	1	1	2	4	1	4	3	22
Ivy League	3	2	4	3	3	2	2	4	2	1	26
MAC	1	3	1	3	3	2	3	3	1	3	23
Pac-12	2	2	1	3	1	1	1	1	3	2	17
Southern	1	2	2	1	1	1	1	1	2	1	13
Pre-allocations	29	29	29	29	27	29	29	28	29	29	287

=== At-large selections ===
The NCAA announced at-large selections on March 11, 2025.

Conference	125	133	141	149	157	165	174	184	197	285	Total
ACC	1	1	1	2	2	0	1	0	0	1	9
Big 12	1	1	1	1	1	1	0	2	1	2	11
Big Ten	1	1	1	1	1	1	1	1	0	1	9
EIWA	0	1	0	1	0	1	1	1	1	0	6
Ivy League	0	0	0	0	2	0	1	0	0	0	3
MAC	0	0	0	0	0	0	0	1	1	0	2
Pac-12	1	0	0	0	1	0	0	0	0	0	2
Southern	0	0	1	1	0	1	0	0	1	0	4
At-large bids	4	4	4	6	7	4	4	5	4	4	46

== Participating teams ==
A total of 66 teams qualified wrestlers. Bellarmine had two NCAA qualifiers in its first season of Division I eligibility. Morgan State sent an alternate who did not compete in the tournament. Cleveland State announced that they would discontinue the wrestling program following the tournament.

- Appalachian State (3)
- Arizona State (3)
- Army (7)
- Bellarmine (2)
- Binghamton (2)
- Brown (1)
- Bucknell (5)
- California Baptist (1)
- Cal Poly (5)
- Cal State Bakersfield (3)
- Campbell (3)
- Central Michigan (6)
- Chattanooga (3)
- Cleveland State (1)
- Columbia (5)
- Cornell (10)
- Drexel (3)
- Duke (1)
- Edinboro (2)
- Gardner–Webb (2)
- George Mason (3)
- Harvard (2)
- Hofstra (2)
- Illinois (8)
- Indiana (6)
- Iowa (9)
- Iowa State (8)
- Lehigh (6)
- Little Rock (5)
- Lock Haven (7)
- Maryland (6)
- Michigan (7)
- Michigan State (3)
- Minnesota (9)
- Missouri (6)
- Morgan State (1)
- Navy (3)
- NC State (8)
- Nebraska (9)
- North Carolina (8)
- North Dakota State (4)
- Northern Colorado (4)
- Northern Illinois (3)
- Northern Iowa (10)
- Northwestern (4)
- Ohio (2)
- Ohio State (10)
- Oklahoma (5)
- Oklahoma State (9)
- Oregon State (6)
- Penn (7)
- Penn State (10)
- Pittsburgh (9)
- Princeton (5)
- Purdue (5)
- Rider (5)
- Rutgers (8)
- South Dakota State (9)
- Stanford (8)
- The Citadel (4)
- Utah Valley (1)
- Virginia (4)
- Virginia Tech (9)
- West Virginia (5)
- Wisconsin (3)
- Wyoming (6)

== Competition schedule ==
The NCAA announced the competition schedule on March 19, 2025.

Date	Time (ET)	Session	Events	TV
March 20	12:00 a.m.	Session I	Pigtails and First Round	ESPNU
March 20	7:00 p.m.	Session II	Pigtail Wrestle-Backs, First Round Wrestle-Backs, Second Round, and Consolation Round	ESPN
March 21	12:00 p.m.	Session III	Quarterfinals, Second Round Wrestle-Backs, and Third Round Wrestle-Backs	ESPNU
March 21	8:00 p.m.	Session IV	Semifinals, Blood Round, and Fifth Round Wrestle-Backs	ESPN2
March 22	11:00 a.m.	Session V	Semifinal Wrestle-Backs, Third-Place Matches, Fifth-Place Matches, and Seventh-Place Matches	ESPNU
March 22	7:00 p.m.	Session VI	First-Place Matches	ESPN

== Team results ==
Rank	Team	Points
1st place, gold medalist(s)	Penn State	177.0
2nd place, silver medalist(s)	Nebraska	117.0
3rd place, bronze medalist(s)	Oklahoma State	102.5
4	Iowa	81.0
5	Ohio State	51.5
5	Minnesota	51.5
7	Cornell	50.0
8	NC State	46.5
9	Northern Iowa	45.5
10	Illinois	44.5

== Individual results ==
Weight	First	Second	Third	Fourth	Fifth	Sixth	Seventh	Eighth
125 lbs	Vincent Robinson; NC State	Troy Spratley; Oklahoma State	Luke Lilledahl; Penn State	Matt Ramos; Purdue	Eddie Ventresca; Virginia Tech	Sheldon Seymour; Lehigh	Caleb Smith; Nebraska	Stevo Poulin; Northern Colorado
133 lbs	Lucas Byrd; Illinois	Drake Ayala; Iowa	Zeth Romney; Cal Poly	Zan Fugitt; Wisconsin	Braeden Davis; Penn State	Connor McGonagle; Virginia Tech	Jacob Van Dee; Nebraska	Tyler Knox; Stanford
141 lbs	Jesse Mendez; Ohio State	Brock Hardy; Nebraska	Beau Bartlett; Penn State	C.J. Composto; Penn	Cael Happel; Northern Iowa	Josh Koderhandt; Navy	Jacob Frost; Iowa State	Vance VomBaur; Minnesota
149 lbs	Ridge Lovett; Nebraska	Caleb Henson; Virginia Tech	Shayne Van Ness; Penn State	Dylan D'Emilio; Ohio State	Lachlan McNeil; North Carolina	Ethan Stiles; Oregon State	Sammy Alvarez; Rider	Gavin Drexler; North Dakota State
157 lbs	Antrell Taylor; Nebraska	Joey Blaze; Purdue	Tyler Kasak; Penn State	Trevor Chumbley; Northwestern	Meyer Shapiro; Cornell	Vinny Zerban; Northern Colorado	Matty Bianchi; Little Rock	Caleb Fish; Oklahoma State
165 lbs	Mitchell Mesenbrink; Penn State	Mike Caliendo; Iowa	Peyton Hall; West Virginia	Christopher Minto; Nebraska	Terrell Barraclough; Utah Valley	Hunter Garvin; Stanford	Cam Steed; Missouri	Cameron Amine; Oklahoma State
174 lbs	Dean Hamiti Jr. Oklahoma State	Keegan O'Toole; Missouri	Levi Haines; Penn State	Patrick Kennedy; Iowa	Simon Ruiz; Cornell	Cade DeVos; South Dakota State	Matthew Singleton; NC State	Danny Wask; Navy
184 lbs	Carter Starocci; Penn State	Parker Keckeisen; Northern Iowa	Max McEnelly; Minnesota	Dustin Plott; Oklahoma State	Chris Foca; Cornell	Jaxon Smith; Maryland	Silas Allred; Nebraska	Donnell Washington; Indiana
197 lbs	Stephen Buchanan; Iowa	Josh Barr; Penn State	A.J. Ferrari; Cal State Bakersfield	Jacob Cardenas; Michigan	Joseph Novak; Wyoming	Stephen Little; Little Rock	Mac Stout; Pittsburgh	Camden McDanel; Nebraska
285 lbs	Wyatt Hendrickson; Oklahoma State	Gable Steveson; Minnesota	Cohlton Schultz; Arizona State	Isaac Trumble; NC State	Owen Trephan; Lehigh	Greg Kerkvliet; Penn State	Joshua Heindselman; Michigan	Ben Kueter; Iowa

=== Finals matches ===
Weight	Champion		Result	Runner-up	
125 lbs	#4 Vince Robinson	NC State	Dec 2–1	#7 Troy Spratley	Oklahoma State
133 lbs	#1 Lucas Byrd	Illinois	TB–2 3–2	#2 Drake Ayala	Iowa
141 lbs	#3 Jesse Mendez	Ohio State	Dec 12–9	#1 Brock Hardy	Nebraska
149 lbs	#2 Ridge Lovett	Nebraska	Dec 1–0	#1 Caleb Henson	Virginia Tech
157 lbs	#3 Antrell Taylor	Nebraska	Dec 4–2	#8 Joey Blaze	Purdue
165 lbs	#1 Mitchell Mesenbrink	Penn State	Dec 8–2	#2 Michael Caliendo	Iowa
174 lbs	#3 Dean Hamiti Jr.	Oklahoma State	SV–1 4–1	#1 Keegan O'Toole	Missouri
184 lbs	#1 Carter Starocci	Penn State	Dec 4–3	#2 Parker Keckeisen	Northern Iowa
197 lbs	#2 Stephen Buchanan	Iowa	Dec 5–2	#4 Josh Barr	Penn State
285 lbs	#2 Wyatt Hendrickson	Oklahoma State	Dec 5–4	#1 Gable Steveson	Minnesota

== Medal table ==
Rank	Team	First	Second	Third	Total
1	Penn State	2	1	5	8
2	Nebraska	2	1	0	3
2	Oklahoma State	2	1	0	3
4	Iowa	1	2	0	3
5	Illinois	1	0	0	1
5	NC State	1	0	0	1
5	Ohio State	1	0	0	1
8	Minnesota	0	1	1	2
9	Purdue	0	1	0	1
9	Missouri	0	1	0	1
9	Northern Iowa	0	1	0	1
9	Virginia Tech	0	1	0	1
13	Arizona State	0	0	1	1
13	Cal Poly	0	0	1	1
13	Cal State Bakersfield	0	0	1	1
13	West Virginia	0	0	1	1
Totals (16 entries)		10	10	10	30

== Awards ==
Award	Recipient	Team	Ref.
NCAA Tournament Most Outstanding Wrestler	Carter Starocci	Penn State	
NCAA Tournament Coach of the Year	Mark Manning	Nebraska	
