= 2022 NCAA Division I Wrestling Championships =

American collegiate wrestling tournament

- Teams: 62
- Format: Knockout
- Finals site: Detroit, Michigan; Little Caesars Arena
- Champions: Penn State (10th title)
- Runner-up: Michigan
- Semifinalists: Iowa; Arizona State
- Winning coach: Cael Sanderson (9th title)
- Television: ESPN Networks

The 2022 NCAA Division I Wrestling Championships took place from March 17–19, 2022, in Detroit, Michigan at the Little Caesars Arena. The tournament is the 91st NCAA Division I Wrestling Championship.

== Team results ==
- Note: Top 10 only
- (H): Team from hosting U.S. state

Rank	Team	Points
1	Penn State	131 1/2
2	Michigan (H)	95
3	Iowa	74
4	Arizona State	66 1/2
5	Nebraska	59 1/2
6	Northwestern	57 1/2
7	Cornell	54 1/2
8	Virginia Tech	52 1/2
9	Missouri	49 1/2
10	NC State	49

== Individual results ==
- (H): Individual from hosting U.S. State

Weight	First	Second	Third	Fourth	Fifth	Sixth	Seventh	Eighth
125 lbs	#1 Nick Suriano; Michigan (H)	#3 Pat Glory; Princeton	#2 Vito Arujau; Cornell	#10 Michael DeAugustino; Northwestern	#8 Patrick McKee; Minnesota	#4 Brandon Courtney; Arizona State	#6 Eric Barnett; Wisconsin	#11 Brandon Kaylor; Oregon State
133 lbs	#1 Roman Bravo-Young; Penn State	#2 Daton Fix; Oklahoma State	#5 Austin DeSanto; Iowa	#3 Michael McGee; Arizona State	#7 Lucas Byrd; Illinois	#4 Korbin Myers; Virginia Tech	#10 Chris Cannon; Northwestern	#11 Devan Turner; Oregon State
141 lbs	#1 Nick Lee; Penn State	#15 Kizhan Clarke; North Carolina	#3 Sebastian Rivera; Rutgers	#8 Grant Willits; Oregon State	#6 Cole Matthews; Pittsburgh	#4 Real Woods; Stanford	#10 Jake Bergeland; Minnesota	#12 CJ Composto; Pennsylvania
149 lbs	#1 Yianni Diakomihalis; Cornell	#10 Ridge Lovett; Nebraska	#11 Bryce Andonian; Virginia Tech	#3 Austin Gomez; Wisconsin	#4 Sammy Sasso; Ohio State	#6 Jonathan Milner; Appalachian State	#2 Tariq Wilson; NC State	#5 Kyle Parco; Arizona State
157 lbs	#2 Ryan Deakin; Northwestern	#5 Quincy Monday; Princeton	#1 David Carr; Iowa State	#10 Peyton Robb; Nebraska	#8 Will Lewan; Michigan (H)	#3 Jacori Teemer; Arizona State	#17 Hunter Willits; Oregon State	#11 Austin O'Connor; North Carolina
165 lbs	#2 Keegan O'Toole; Missouri	#5 Shane Griffith; Stanford	#1 Evan Wick; Cal Poly	#6 Cameron Amine; Michigan (H)	#3 Alex Marinelli; Iowa	#4 Dean Hamiti; Wisconsin	#7 Carson Kharchla; Ohio State	#9 Peyton Hall; West Virginia
174 lbs	#1 Carter Starocci; Penn State	#2 Mekhi Lewis; Virginia Tech	#4 Hayden Hidlay; NC State	#5 Michael Kemerer; Iowa	#3 Logan Massa; Michigan (H)	#6 Dustin Plott; Oklahoma State	#9 Mikey Labriola; Nebraska	#10 Clay Lautt; North Carolina
184 lbs	#2 Aaron Brooks; Penn State	#1 Myles Amine; Michigan (H)	#4 Parker Keckeisen; Northern Iowa	#5 Bernie Truax; Cal Poly	#3 Trent Hidlay; NC State	#7 Kaleb Romero; Ohio State	#8 Marcus Coleman; Iowa State	#11 Jonathan Loew; Cornell
197 lbs	#1 Max Dean; Penn State	#6 Jacob Warner; Iowa	#2 Stephen Buchanan; Wyoming	#7 Rocky Elam; Missouri	#10 Yonger Bastida; Iowa State	#21 Gavin Hoffman; Ohio State	#3 Eric Schultz; Nebraska	#14 Greg Bulsak; Rutgers
285 lbs	#1 Gable Steveson; Minnesota	#2 Cohlton Schultz; Arizona State	#6 Jordan Wood; Lehigh	#4 Greg Kerkvliet; Penn State	#7 Mason Parris; Michigan (H)	#9 Lucas Davison; Northwestern	#3 Tony Cassioppi; Iowa	#12 Christian Lance; Nebraska
