= 2024 Big Ten Wrestling Championships =

American collegiate tournament

- Classification: Division I
- Teams: 14
- Site: Xfinity Center; College Park, Maryland
- Champions: Penn State (8th title)
- Winning coach: Cael Sanderson (8th title)
- MOW: Aaron Brooks (Penn State)
- Television: Big Ten Network

The 2024 Big Ten Wrestling Championships took place from March 9–10, 2024, in College Park, Maryland at the Xfinity Center.

Penn State under head coach Cael Sanderson won their eighth Big Ten Conference championship with individual titles from Braeden Davis (125 lbs), Levi Haines (157 lbs), Mitchell Mesenbrink (165 lbs), Aaron Brooks (197 lbs), and Greg Kerkvliet (285 lbs).

== Team results ==
Rank	Team	Points
1st place, gold medalist(s)	Penn State	170.5
2nd place, silver medalist(s)	Michigan	123.5
3rd place, bronze medalist(s)	Nebraska	118.0
4	Iowa	110.5
5	Ohio State	89.0
6	Rutgers	87.5
7	Minnesota	74.0
8	Wisconsin	46.5
9	Purdue	41.5
10	Maryland (H)	39.0
11	Illinois	34.0
12	Indiana	33.0
13	Michigan State	23.5
14	Northwestern	14.5

== Individual results ==
Weight class	First	Second	Third
125 lbs	#6 Braeden Davis; Penn State	#4 Patrick McKee; Nebraska	#2 Drake Ayala; Iowa
133 lbs	#2 Dylan Shawver; Rutgers	#1 Dylan Ragusin; Michigan	#3 Aaron Nagao; Penn State
141 lbs	#2 Jesse Mendez; Ohio State	#1 Beau Bartlett; Penn State	#3 Real Woods; Iowa
149 lbs	#1 Ridge Lovett; Nebraska	#2 Austin Gomez; Michigan	#4 Tyler Kasak; Penn State
157 lbs	#1 Levi Haines; Penn State	#7 Will Lewan; Michigan	#5 Peyton Robb; Nebraska
165 lbs	#2 Mitchell Mesenbrink; Penn State	#1 Dean Hamiti; Wisconsin	#3 Mike Caliendo; Iowa
174 lbs	#4 Edmond Ruth; Illinois	#2 Shane Griffith; Michigan	#5 Rocco Welsh; Ohio State
184 lbs	#1 Isaiah Salazar; Minnesota	#3 Bernie Truax; Penn State	#2 Lenny Pinto; Nebraska
197 lbs	#1 Aaron Brooks; Penn State	#3 Zach Glazier; Iowa	#4 Silas Allred; Nebraska
285 lbs	#1 Greg Kerkvliet; Penn State	#2 Nick Feldman; Ohio State	#3 Lucas Davison; Michigan
