= 2025 Big Ten Wrestling Championships =

Tournament in Illinois, USA

- Classification: Division I
- Teams: 14
- Site: Welsh–Ryan Arena; Evanston, Illinois
- Television: Big Ten Network

The 2025 Big Ten Wrestling Championships took place March 8–9, 2025, in Evanston, Illinois at Welsh–Ryan Arena.

== Team results ==
Rank	Team	Points
1st place, gold medalist(s)	Penn State	181.5
2nd place, silver medalist(s)	Nebraska	137
3rd place, bronze medalist(s)	Iowa	112
4	Minnesota	108.5
5	Illinois	105.5
6	Ohio State	95.5
7	Michigan	71
8	Maryland	54
9	Rutgers	46
10	Purdue	44.5
11	Indiana	33
12	Northwestern	21.5
13	Wisconsin	19
14	Michigan State	11.5

== Individual results ==
Weight class	First	Second	Third
125 lbs	#4 Luke Lilledahl; Penn State	#2 Caleb Smith; Nebraska	
133 lbs	#2 Lucas Byrd; Illinois	#1 Drake Ayala; Iowa	
141 lbs	#3 Brock Hardy; Nebraska	#4 Vance Vombaur; Minnesota	
149 lbs	#3 Ridge Lovett; Nebraska	#5 Kannon Webster; Illinois	
157 lbs	#2 Tyler Kasak; Penn State	#8 Brandon Cannon; Ohio State	
165 lbs	#1 Mitchell Mesenbrink; Penn State	#2 Mike Caliendo; Iowa	
174 lbs	#1 Levi Haines; Penn State	#3 Lenny Pinto; Nebraska	
184 lbs	#1 Carter Starocci; Penn State	#2 Max McEnelly; Minnesota	
197 lbs	#3 Jacob Cardenas; Michigan	#1 Stephen Buchanan; Iowa	
285 lbs	#1 Gable Steveson; Minnesota	#2 Greg Kerkvliet; Penn State	
