= 2024 NCAA Division I Wrestling Championships =

American collegiate wrestling tournament

- Teams: 68
- Format: Knockout
- Finals site: Kansas City, Missouri; T-Mobile Center
- Champions: Penn State (12th title)
- Runner-up: Cornell
- Winning coach: Cael Sanderson (11th title)
- Television: ESPN Networks

The 2024 NCAA Division I Wrestling Championships took place from March 21–23, 2024, in Kansas City, Missouri at the T-Mobile Center. The tournament is the 93rd NCAA Division I Wrestling Championship.

Penn State earned the record for overall team score, beating the record set by the 1997 Iowa team on the strength of Aaron Brooks and Carter Starocci winning their fourth NCAA titles. It was their 11th in 13 years. California Baptist and Long Island made their Division I debuts while Little Rock had their first two All-Americans in program history. Little Rock's historic season also earned Neil Erisman the honor of NCAA Tournament Coach of the Year.

== Team results ==
- Note: Top 10 only

Rank	Team	Points
1	Penn State	172.5
2	Cornell	72.5
3	Michigan	71
4	Iowa State	68.5
5	Iowa	67
6	Arizona State	64.5
7	Virginia Tech	64
8	Ohio State	62
9	Nebraska	60.5
10	Oklahoma State	56

== Individual results ==
- (H): Individual from hosting U.S. State

Weight	First	Second	Third	Fourth	Fifth	Sixth	Seventh	Eighth
125 lbs	#8 Richard Figueroa; Arizona State	#3 Drake Ayala; Iowa	#12 Anthony Noto; Lock Haven	#10 Eric Barnett; Wisconsin	#2 Luke Stanich; Lehigh	#15 Caleb Smith; Nebraska	#5 Jore Volk; Wyoming	#23 Tanner Jordan; South Dakota State
133 lbs	#6 Vito Arujau; Cornell	#1 Daton Fix; Oklahoma State	#2 Ryan Crookham; Lehigh	#7 Nasir Bailey; Little Rock	#5 Dylan Ragusin; Michigan	#8 Evan Frost; Iowa State	#4 Dylan Shawver; Rutgers	#3 Kai Orine; NC State
141 lbs	#1 Jesse Mendez; Ohio State	#2 Beau Bartlett; Penn State	#9 Brock Hardy; Nebraska	#3 Real Woods; Iowa	#5 Anthony Echemendia; Iowa State	#6 Lachlan McNeil; North Carolina	#4 Ryan Jack; NC State	#26 Vance Vombaur; Minnesota
149 lbs	#4 Caleb Henson; Virginia Tech	#6 Austin Gomez; Michigan	#7 Tyler Kasak; Penn State	#5 Ty Watters; West Virginia	#2 Kyle Parco; Arizona State	#1 Ridge Lovett; Nebraska	#8 Casey Swiderski; Iowa State	#11 Quinn Kinner; Rider
157 lbs	#1 Levi Haines; Penn State	#2 Jacori Teemer; Arizona State	#3 Meyer Shapiro; Cornell	#6 Daniel Cardenas; Stanford	#7 Peyten Kellar; Ohio	#12 Bryce Andonian; Virginia Tech	#8 Peyton Robb; Nebraska	#10 Jared Franek; Iowa
165 lbs	#4 David Carr; Iowa State	#2 Mitchell Mesenbrink; Penn State	#1 Keegan O'Toole; Missouri (H)	#6 Michael Caliendo; Iowa	#7 Izzak Olejnik; Oklahoma State	#20 Hunter Garvin; Stanford	#9 Peyton Hall; West Virginia	#8 Antrell Taylor; Nebraska
174 lbs	#9 Carter Starocci; Penn State	#6 Rocco Welsh; Ohio State	#4 Shane Griffith; Michigan	#1 Mekhi Lewis; Virginia Tech	#2 Cade DeVos; South Dakota State	#7 Lennox Wolak; Columbia	#3 Edmond Ruth; Illinois	#18 Benjamin Pasiuk; Army Black Knights
184 lbs	#1 Parker Keckeisen; Northern Iowa	#3 Dustin Plott; Oklahoma State	#4 Trey Munoz; Oregon State	#9 Bennett Berge; South Dakota State	#6 Bernie Truax; Penn State	#2 Isaiah Salazar; Minnesota	#7 Thomas Stewart Jr. Virginia Tech	#25 David Key; Navy
197 lbs	#1 Aaron Brooks; Penn State	#2 Trent Hidlay; NC State	#8 Stephen Buchanan; Oklahoma	#5 Jacob Cardenas; Cornell	#3 Tanner Sloan; South Dakota State	#12 Rocky Elam; Missouri (H)	#9 Stephen Little; Little Rock	#4 Michael Beard; Lehigh
285 lbs	#1 Greg Kerkvliet; Penn State	#10 Lucas Davison; Michigan	#3 Wyatt Hendrickson; Air Force	#6 Zach Elam; Missouri (H)	#9 Nick Feldman; Ohio State	#4 Cohlton Schultz; Arizona State	#13 Yaraslau Slavikouski; Rutgers	#7 Taye Ghadiali; Campbell
