= 2023 Big Ten Wrestling Championships =

- Classification: Division I
- Teams: 14
- Site: Crisler Center; Ann Arbor, Michigan
- Champions: Penn State (7th title)
- Winning coach: Cael Sanderson (7th title)
- MOW: Spencer Lee (Iowa)
- Television: Big Ten Network

The 2023 Big Ten Wrestling Championships took place from March 4–5, 2023, in Ann Arbor, Michigan at the Crisler Center.

Penn State under head coach Cael Sanderson won their seventh Big Ten Championship title with individual titles from Roman Bravo-Young (133 lbs), Levi Haines (157 lbs), Carter Starocci (174 lbs), and Aaron Brooks (184 lbs).

== Team results ==
Rank	Team	Points
1st place, gold medalist(s)	Penn State	147.0
2nd place, silver medalist(s)	Iowa	134.5
3rd place, bronze medalist(s)	Nebraska	104.5
4	Ohio State	99.0
5	Michigan (H)	84.5
6	Minnesota	79.0
7	Northwestern	78.5
8	Wisconsin	55.5
9	Purdue	47.0
10	Illinois	46.5
11	Rutgers	32.0
12	Indiana	30.0
13	Michigan State	28.0
14	Maryland	28.0

== Individual results ==
Weight class	First	Second	Third
125 lbs	#1 Spencer Lee; Iowa	#2 Liam Cronin; Nebraska	#3 Matt Ramos; Purdue
133 lbs	#1 Roman Bravo-Young; Penn State	#6 Aaron Nagao; Minnesota	#3 Lucas Byrd; Illinois
141 lbs	#1 Real Woods; Iowa	#3 Brock Hardy; Nebraska	#2 Beau Bartlett; Penn State
149 lbs	#1 Sammy Sasso; Ohio State	#6 Michael Blockhus; Minnesota	#4 Max Murin; Iowa
157 lbs	#2 Levi Haines; Penn State	#1 Peyton Robb; Nebraska	#6 Will Lewan; Michigan (H)
165 lbs	#1 Dean Hamiti; Wisconsin	#3 Patrick Kennedy; Iowa	#5 Carson Kharchla; Ohio State
174 lbs	#1 Carter Starocci; Penn State	#2 Mikey Labriola; Nebraska	#3 Ethan Smith; Ohio State
184 lbs	#1 Aaron Brooks; Penn State	#2 Kaleb Romero; Ohio State	#4 Matt Finesilver; Michigan (H)
197 lbs	#2 Silas Allred; Nebraska	#1 Max Dean; Penn State	#6 Jaxon Smith; Maryland
285 lbs	#1 Mason Parris; Michigan (H)	#2 Greg Kerkvliet; Penn State	#3 Tony Cassioppi; Iowa
