= Nebraska Cornhuskers wrestling =

University of Nebraska–Lincoln wrestling team

- Founded: 1911; 115 years ago
- University: University of Nebraska–Lincoln
- Athletic director: Troy Dannen
- Head coach: Mark Manning (26th season)
- Conference: Big Ten
- Location: Lincoln, Nebraska
- Arena: Bob Devaney Sports Center (capacity: 8,309)
- Nickname: Cornhuskers
- Colors: Scarlet and cream

NCAA individual champions
- 13

All-Americans
- 144

Conference Tournament championships
- 1911, 1915, 1924, 1949, 1993, 1995, 2009

The Nebraska Cornhuskers wrestling team competes as part of NCAA Division I, representing the University of Nebraska–Lincoln in the Big Ten Conference. Nebraska primarily hosted meets at the NU Coliseum from 1926 until moving to the larger Bob Devaney Sports Center in 2013.

Since its inception in 1911, the program has won seven conference tournament titles and produced eleven individual NCAA champions with 136 All-America selections. Rulon Gardner and Jordan Burroughs became Olympic gold medalists after their collegiate careers; Burroughs is the most decorated American wrestler of all-time and is considered one of the greatest freestyle wrestlers ever.

The team has been coached by Mark Manning since 2000.

== Conference affiliations ==
- Independent (1911–1915)
- Western Intercollegiate Gymnastics and Fencing Association (1911 and 1915, postseason invitational only) (Note: In 1911 and 1915, Nebraska participated in the Western Intercollegiate Wrestling, Gymnastics, and Fencing Association Invitational, an open tournament that determined a Big Ten wrestling champion until 1921.)
- Missouri Valley Intercollegiate Athletic Association / Big Eight (1916–1996) (Note: In 1928, the ten member schools of the Missouri Valley Intercollegiate Athletic Association agreed to a splintering of the conference – Iowa State, Kansas, Kansas State, Missouri, Nebraska, and Oklahoma retained the MVIAA name and Drake, Grinnell, Oklahoma A&M (now Oklahoma State), and Washington University formed the Missouri Valley Conference. The MVIAA became commonly known as the Big Six, and later the Big Seven and Big Eight. Its name was officially changed to the Big Eight in 1964.)
- Big 12 (1996–2011)
- Big Ten (2011–present)

== Coaches ==
=== Coaching history ===
No.	Coach	Tenure	Overall	Conference
1	Raymond G. Clapp	1911–1927	17–17–1 (.500)	8–7 (.533)
2	John Kellogg	1928–1931	13–15–1 (.466)	9–10–1 (.475)
3	R. G. Lehman	1932	2–3 (.400)	
4	Harold Ecklund; C. E. Thomas	1933	0–2 (.000)	
5	Jerry Adam	1934–1947	16–72–4 (.196)	5–26–2 (.182)
6	B. R. Patterson	1948–1950	13–18–1 (.422)	8–5–1 (.607)
7	Al Partin	1951–1954	15–24–4 (.395)	4–12 (.250)
8	Don Strasheim	1955–1957	3–25–0 (.107)	0–9 (.000)
9	Bill Smith	1958–1960	2–31–1 (.074)	0–11 (.000)
10	Mickey Sparano	1960–1961	5–3–1 (.611)	1–2 (.333)
11	Robert Mancuso	1961–1964	15–23–1 (.397)	4–8 (.333)
12	Orval Borgialli	1964–1978	72–106–6 (.408)	15–43–3 (.270)
13	Bob Fehrs	1978–1985	95–51–2 (.649)	6–24 (.200)
14	Tim Neumann	1985–2000	199–77–6 (.716)	31–35–3 (.471)
15	Mark Manning	2000–present	318–116–3 (.731)	104–66 (.612)

=== Coaching staff ===
Name	Position	First year	Alma mater
Mark Manning	Head coach	2000	Omaha
Bryan Snyder	Associate head coach	2011	Nebraska
Tervel Dlagnev	Assistant coach	2021	Nebraska at Kearney
Robert Kokesh	Assistant coach	2026	Nebraska

== Venues ==
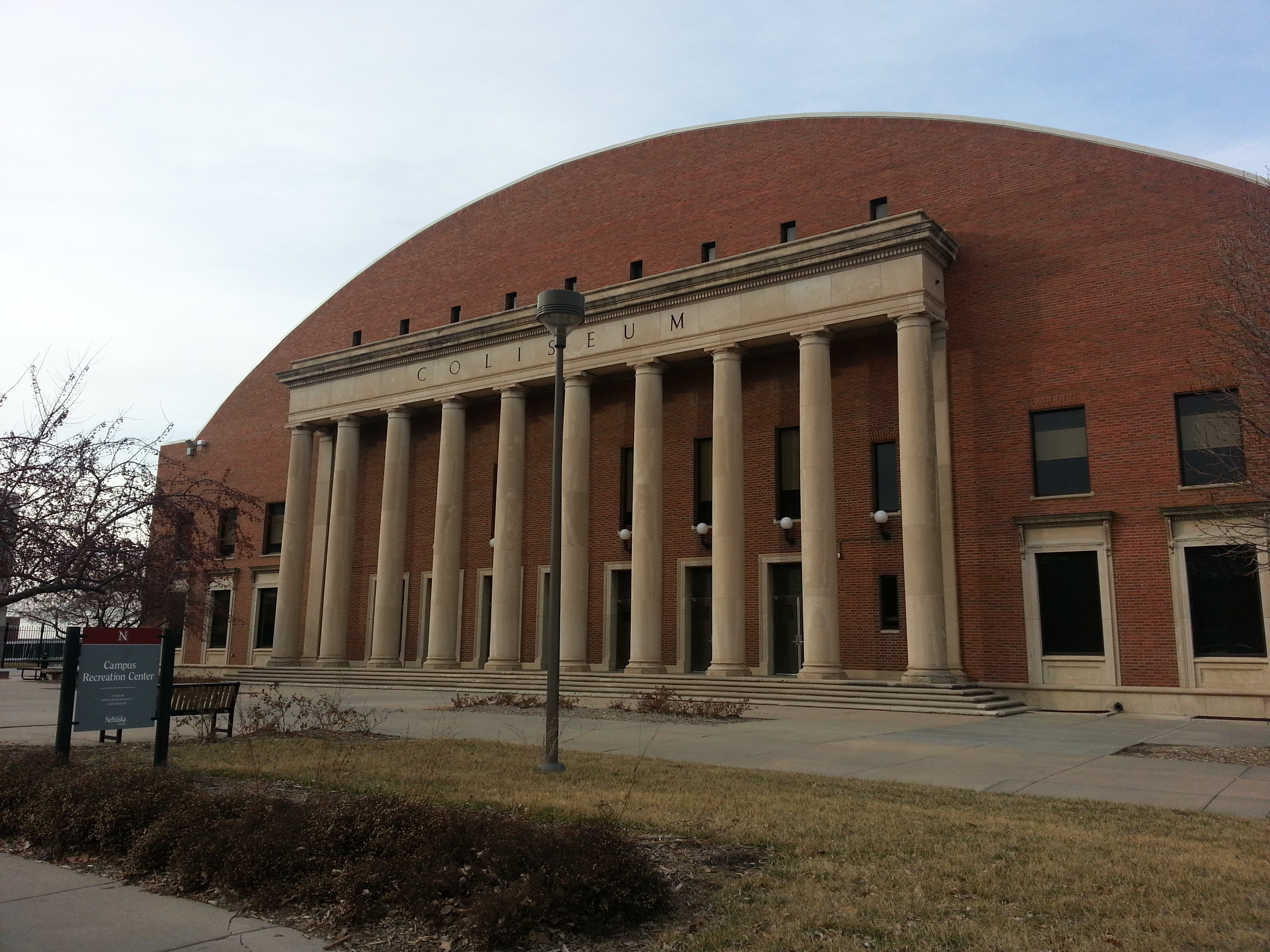
Nebraska hosted wrestling meets at the NU Coliseum from 1926 until 2013

The University of Nebraska broke ground on the NU Coliseum in 1924, adjacent to the recently completed Memorial Stadium. Initially intended to be a part of the stadium complex, the Coliseum was funded as a standalone project using gate receipts from 1923 football games. It was designed by architects Ellery L. Davis and Walter Wilson, both university alumni who had worked on several buildings around NU's campus, including Memorial Stadium. Upon its completion in 1926, the Coliseum hosted most of the university's indoor athletic events.

Nebraska's basketball programs moved to the NU Sports Complex (later the Bob Denavey Sports Center) in 1976. Volleyball and wrestling remained at the Coliseum, though the Devaney Center was often used for larger wrestling events. The West Haymarket Arena (known as Pinnacle Bank Arena for sponsorship purposes) was built in 2013 to host basketball, and Nebraska permanently moved its wrestling program a renovated Devaney Center. The Devaney Center's listed capacity is 8,309, though Nebraska has never sold out the venue for a wrestling meet. A program-record crowd of 6,736 watched top-ranked Penn State defeat No. 7 Nebraska on January 17, 2025.

The program practices and trains at the Hendricks Training Complex, a workout facility attached to the Devaney Center.

== Championships and awards ==
=== Team conference championships ===
- WIGFA: 1911, 1915
- MVIAA / Big Eight: 1924, 1949, 1993, 1995
- Big 12: 2009

=== Individual awards ===
- Dan Hodge Trophy: Jordan Burroughs (2011)
- Gorriaran Award: Gary Albright (1982, 1986), Jason Kelber (1989), Tolly Thompson (1997), Jason Powell (2003)

=== NCAA champions ===
Year	Wrestler	Weight
1963	Mike Nissen	123 lbs
1984	Jim Scherr	177 lbs
1984	Bill Scherr	190 lbs
1991	Jason Kelber	126 lbs
1993	Tony Purler	126 lbs
1995	Tolly Thompson	HWT
2000	Brad Vering	197 lbs
2004	Jason Powell	125 lbs
2007	Paul Donahoe	125 lbs
2009	Jordan Burroughs	157 lbs
2011	Jordan Burroughs	165 lbs
2025	Ridge Lovett	149 lbs
2025	Antrell Taylor	157 lbs

=== Conference champions ===
- John Kellogg – 1924 (125 lb)
- Adolph Simac – 1929 (155 lb)
- Mike DiBiase – 1947 (HWT), 1948 (HWT), 1949 (HWT)
- Bob Yambor – 1948 (121 lb), 1949 (121 lb)
- Michael Sparano – 1949 (136 lb)
- Herb Reese – 1949 (175 lb), 1950 (175 lb), 1951 (HWT)
- Harold Gilliland – 1950 (126 lb)
- Ed Husman – 1953 (HWT)
- Max Kitzelman – 1954 (HWT)
- Charles Bryant – 1955 (167 lb)
- Harold Thompson – 1962 (147 lb)
- James Raschke – 1962 (HWT)
- Johnnie Selmon – 1981 (134 lb), 1982 (142 lb)
- Bill Scherr – 1982 (190 lb), 1984 (190 lb)
- Jim Scherr – 1984 (177 lb)
- Gary Albright – 1984 (HWT)
- Cody Olson – 1987 (177 lb)
- Sonny Manley – 1989 (HWT)
- John Buxton – 1990 (118 lb)
- Joe Malecek – 1990 (HWT)
- Jason Kelber – 1991 (126 lb)
- Chris Nelson – 1992 (190 lb)
- Tony Purler – 1993 (126 lb)
- Frank Velazquez – 1993 (134 lb), 1994 (134 lb)
- Matt Lindland – 1993 (158 lb)
- Steve Baer – 1995 (126 lb)
- Temoer Terry – 1995 (150 lb)
- Jason Kraft – 1995 (158 lb), 1996 (158 lb)
- Tolly Thompson – 1995 (HWT), 1996 (HWT), 1997 (HWT)
- Brad Vering – 1998 (177 lb)
- Ryan Tobin – 1998 (190 lb)
- Bryan Snyder – 1999 (157 lb), 2000 (157 lb), 2001 (157 lb), 2002 (157 lb)
- Jason Powell – 2001 (125 lb)
- B. J. Padden – 2005 (197 lb), 2006 (197 lb)
- Brandon Browne – 2008 (174 lb), 2009 (174 lb)
- Jordan Burroughs – 2008 (149 lb), 2009 (157 lb), 2011 (165 lb)
- Paul Donahoe – 2008 (125 lb)
- Vince Jones – 2009 (184 lb)
- Craig Brester – 2009 (197 lb)
- Stephen Dwyer – 2010 (174 lb)
- David Klingsheim – 2011 (125 lb)
- James Green – 2014 (157 lb)
- Robert Kokesh – 2014 (174 lb)
- Silas Allred – 2023 (197 lb)
- Ridge Lovett – 2024 (149 lb), 2025 (149 lb)
- Brock Hardy – 2025 (141 lb)

=== All-Americans ===
- Newt Copple – 1942 (145 lb)
- Herb Reese – 1949 (175 lb)
- Max Kitzelman – 1954 (HWT)
- Daniel Brand – 1958 (HWT)
- Mike Nissen – 1962 (123 lb), 1963 (123 lb)
- Harold Thompson – 1962 (147 lb)
- Joe George – 1971 (167 lb)
- Al Freeman – 1981 (142 lb), 1983 (142 lb)
- Gary Albright – 1982 (HWT), 1984 (HWT), 1986 (HWT)
- Jim Scherr – 1982 (177 lb), 1984 (177 lb)
- Bill Scherr – 1982 (190 lb), 1983 (190 lb), 1984 (190 lb)
- Johnnie Selmon – 1982 (142 lb)
- Ray Oliver – 1983 (167 lb)
- Gil Sanchez – 1987 (134 lb)
- Scott Chenoweth – 1989 (167 lb), 1990 (167 lb), 1991 (177 lb)
- Jason Kelber – 1989 (126 lb), 1990 (126 lb), 1991 (126 lb)
- Paul Herrera – 1990 (142 lb)
- Joe Malecek – 1990 (HWT)
- Chris Nelson – 1990 (190 lb), 1992 (190 lb)
- Corey Olson – 1990 (177 lb), 1992 (177 lb), 1993 (177 lb)
- John Buxton – 1993 (118 lb)
- Mike Eierman – 1993 (142 lb)
- Rulon Gardner – 1993 (HWT)
- Tony Purler – 1993 (126 lb)
- Frank Velazquez – 1993 (134 lb)
- Scott Gonyo – 1994 (118 lb)
- Steve Baer – 1995 (126 lb)
- Brad Canoyer – 1995 (118 lb)
- Temoer Terry – 1995 (150 lb), 1996 (158 lb), 1998 (158 lb)
- Tolly Thompson – 1995 (HWT), 1996 (HWT), 1997 (HWT)
- Ryan Tobin – 1995 (190 lb), 1996 (190 lb), 1998 (190 lb)
- Chad Nelson – 1996 (167 lb)
- Jose DeAnda – 1999 (141 lb)
- Bryan Snyder – 1999 (157 lb), 2000 (157 lb), 2001 (157 lb), 2002 (157 lb)
- Brad Vering – 1999 (184 lb), 2000 (197 lb), 2001 (197 lb)
- Todd Beckerman – 2000 (133 lb), 2001 (133 lb)
- Paul Gomez – 2000 (125 lb)
- Ati Conner – 2001 (174 lb)
- Jason Powell – 2002 (118 lb), 2003 (125 lb), 2004 (125 lb)
- Justin Ruiz – 2002 (197 lb), 2003 (197 lb)
- Jacob Klein – 2004 (165 lb), 2006 (174 lb)
- Matt Murray – 2004 (141 lb)
- Travis Shufelt – 2004 (149 lb)
- B. J. Padden – 2005 (197 lb), 2006 (197 lb)
- Travis Pascoe – 2005 (184 lb)
- Paul Donahoe – 2007 (125 lb), 2008 (125 lb)
- Craig Brester – 2008 (197 lb), 2009 (197 lb), 2010 (197 lb)
- Brandon Browne – 2008 (174 lb), 2009 (174 lb)
- Jordan Burroughs – 2008 (149 lb), 2009 (157 lb), 2011 (165 lb)
- Stephen Dwyer – 2008 (165 lb), 2010 (174 lb)
- Vince Jones – 2009 (184 lb)
- James Green – 2012 (157 lb), 2013 (157 lb), 2014 (157 lb), 2015 (157 lb)
- Josh Ihnen – 2012 (184 lb)
- Robert Kokesh – 2013 (174 lb), 2014 (174 lb), 2015 (174 lb)
- T. J. Dudley – 2015 (184 lb), 2016 (184 lb), 2017 (184 lb)
- Eric Montoya – 2016 (133 lb), 2017 (133 lb)
- Austin Wilson – 2016 (165 lb)
- Tyler Berger – 2017 (157 lb), 2018 (157 lb), 2019 (157 lb)
- Aaron Studebaker – 2017 (197 lb)
- Chad Red Jr. – 2018 (141 lb), 2019 (141 lb), 2020 (Note: All-America selections are typically based on performance in the NCAA championship. When the 2020 championship was canceled due to the COVID-19 pandemic, the NWCA selected an All-America team based on performance throughout the conference season prior to the cancelation.) (141 lb), 2021 (141 lb)
- Taylor Venz – 2018 (184 lb), 2020 (184 lb)
- Mikey Labriola – 2019 (174 lb), 2020 (174 lb), 2021 (174 lb), 2022 (174 lb), 2023 (174 lb)
- Isaiah White – 2019 (165 lb), 2020 (165 lb)
- Ridge Lovett – 2020 (133 lb), 2022 (149 lb), 2024 (149 lb), 2025 (149 lb)
- Collin Purinton – 2020 (149)
- Peyton Robb – 2020 (157 lb), 2022 (157 lb), 2023 (157 lb), 2024 (157 lb)
- Eric Schultz – 2020 (197 lb), 2022 (197 lb)
- Christian Lance – 2022 (HWT)
- Liam Cronin – 2023 (125 lb)
- Brock Hardy – 2023 (141 lb), 2024 (141 lb), 2025 (141 lb)
- Caleb Smith – 2024 (125 lb), 2025 (125 lb)
- Antrell Taylor – 2024 (165 lb), 2025 (157 lb)
- Silas Allred – 2025 (184 lb)
- Camden McDaniel – 2025 (197 lb)
- Christopher Minto – 2025 (165 lb)
- Jacob Van Dee – 2025 (133 lb)

== Seasons ==
Conference tournament champion

Year	Coach	Record	Conference	Conference championship	Postseason (Note: The first NCAA Division I Championship was held in 1928.)	Final rank (Note: The National Collegiate Wrestling Association began weekly polling of collegiate wrestling coaches in 1981.)
Independent (1910–1915)
1911	Raymond G. Clapp	0–0		1st		
1912	Did not compete (Note: Nebraska's wrestling program competed sporadically in its early years, often playing only a single meet per season and sometimes none at all.)					
1913	Did not compete					
1914	Did not compete					
1915	Raymond G. Clapp	1–0	0–0	1st		
MVIAA / Big Eight Conference (1916–1996)
1916	Raymond G. Clapp	0–1–1		Not available		
1917	Did not compete					
1918	Did not compete					
1919	Raymond G. Clapp	0–1		Not available		
1920	Did not compete					
1921	Did not compete					
1922	Raymond G. Clapp	2–1	0–0	Not available		
1923	Raymond G. Clapp	4–1	1–1	Not available		
1924	Raymond G. Clapp	2–3	1–1	1st		
1925	Raymond G. Clapp	1–4	0–2	5th		
1926	Raymond G. Clapp	4–2	3–1	3rd		
1927	Raymond G. Clapp	3–4	3–2	4th		
1928	John Kellogg	3–4	2–3	5th	NCAA 5th	
1929	John Kellogg	3–3–1	2–2–1	3rd		
1930	John Kellogg	5–3	3–2	3rd		
1931	John Kellogg	2–5	2–3	4th		
1932	R. G. Lehman	2–3		4th		
1933	Harold Ecklund; C. E. Thomas	0–2		5th		
1934	Jerry Adam	1–4–1	1–3–1	T–5th		
1935	Jerry Adam	1–7	0–5	5th		
1936	Jerry Adam	2–6	2–2	6th		
1937	Jerry Adam	4–4–1	1–1–1	5th		
1938	Jerry Adam	1–7–1	0–3	4th		
1939	Jerry Adam	3–6–1	1–1	4th		
1940	Jerry Adam	1–7	0–2	4th		
1941	Jerry Adam	0–9	0–2	4th		
1942	Jerry Adam	0–8	0–2	Canceled (Note: Canceled due to World War II.)	NCAA T–12th	
1943	Did not compete (Note: Nebraska did not field a team from 1943 to 1945 due to World War II)					
1944	Did not compete					
1945	Did not compete					
1946	Jerry Adam	0–8	0–2	Canceled	NCAA T–9th	
1947	Jerry Adam	3–7	0–3	3rd		
1948	B. R. Patterson	2–8	2–3	2nd		
1949	B. R. Patterson	6–4–1	3–0–1	1st	NCAA T–7th	
1950	B. R. Patterson	5–6	3–2	2nd		
1951	Al Partin	4–6–1	2–3	T–4th		
1952	Al Partin	0–9–1	0–5	4th		
1953	Al Partin	9–1	2–1	T–4th		
1953–54	Al Partin	2–8	0–3	5th	NCAA T–14th	
1955	Don Strasheim	0–12	0–3	5th		
1956	Don Strasheim	2–6	0–3	5th		
1957	Don Strasheim	1–7	0–3	5th		
1958	Bill Smith	1–9	0–3	6th	NCAA T–17th	
1958–59	Bill Smith	1–9–1	0–5	6th	NCAA T–39th	
1959–60	Bill Smith	0–13	0–3	6th		
1960–61	Mickey Sparano	5–3–1	1–2	6th	NCAA T–21st	
1961–62	Robert Mancuso	9–2–1	4–1	4th	NCAA 9th	
1962–63	Robert Mancuso	2–14	0–4	6th	NCAA University Division 13th	
1963–64	Robert Mancuso	4–7	0–3	7th		
1964–65	Orval Borgialli	5–11–1	3–4–1	6th		
1965–66	Orval Borgialli	2–13	1–5	5th		
1966–67	Orval Borgialli	3–10	0–5	6th		
1967–68	Orval Borgialli	4–12–1	1–4	7th		
1968–69	Orval Borgialli	4–9	0–3	7th		
1970	Orval Borgialli	6–5–2	1–1–2	5th		
1970–71	Orval Borgialli	8–5	2–2	4th		
1971–72	Orval Borgialli	9–5–1	2–2	4th		
1972–73	Orval Borgialli	4–10	0–4	4th	NCAA University Division 21st	
1973–74	Orval Borgialli	7–6	1–4	6th		
1974–75	Orval Borgialli	8–3	3–2	4th	NCAA Division I T–45th	
1975–76	Orval Borgialli	6–6	2–2	5th		
1976–77	Orval Borgialli	2–6	0–2	6th		
1977–78	Orval Borgialli	4–6–1	0–3	6th	NCAA Division I T–55th	
1978–79	Bob Fehrs	9–10	1–4	6th		
1979–80	Bob Fehrs	16–9–2	1–4	6th	NCAA Division I 39th	
1980–81	Bob Fehrs	16–4	0–4	4th	NCAA Division I 32nd	
1981–82	Bob Fehrs	14–5	1–3	4th	NCAA Division I 6th	16
1982–83	Bob Fehrs	17–4	1–3	3rd	NCAA Division I 6th	6
1983–84	Bob Fehrs	15–5	1–3	4th	NCAA Division I 4th	14
1984–85	Bob Fehrs	8–14	1–3	4th	NCAA Division I 41st	
1985–86	Tim Neumann	16–5	1–3	4th	NCAA Division I 12th	13
1986–87	Tim Neumann	12–6	2–2	4th	NCAA Division I 14th	
1987–88	Tim Neumann	8–9–1	0–3–1	4th	NCAA Division I 39th	
1988–89	Tim Neumann	12–6–2	1–3–1	4th	NCAA Division I 17th	9
1989–90	Tim Neumann	21–2–1	4–1	2nd	NCAA Division I 5th	4
1990–91	Tim Neumann	11–6	2–3	3rd	NCAA Division I 10th	9
1991–92	Tim Neumann	13–4	1–3	3rd	NCAA Division I 11th	8
1992–93	Tim Neumann	10–2	3–1	1st	NCAA Division I 3rd	2
1993–94	Tim Neumann	12–6	3–3	3rd	NCAA Division I 29th	7
1994–95	Tim Neumann	17–3	3–3	1st	NCAA Division I 6th	3
1995–96	Tim Neumann	15–3–1	2–2–1	2nd	NCAA Division I 5th	3
Big 12 Conference (1996–2011)
1996–97	Tim Neumann	15–6	3–2	4th	NCAA Division I 12th	10
1997–98	Tim Neumann	10–6	2–3	3rd	NCAA Division I 21st	10
1998–99	Tim Neumann	17–6	3–1	4th	NCAA Division I 15th	4
1999–00	Tim Neumann	10–7–1	1–3	4th	NCAA Division I 8th	11
2000–01	Mark Manning	11–6	1–3	4th	NCAA Division I 8th	9
2001–02	Mark Manning	8–9	0–4	4th	NCAA Division I 8th	9
2002–03	Mark Manning	16–7	1–3	4th	NCAA Division I 13th	17
2003–04	Mark Manning	19–3	2–2	2nd	NCAA Division I 5th	2
2004–05	Mark Manning	19–2–1	3–1	3rd	NCAA Division I 19th	3
2005–06	Mark Manning	12–5	2–2	3rd	NCAA Division I 16th	5
2006–07	Mark Manning	10–7–1	1–3	4th	NCAA Division I 16th	18
2007–08	Mark Manning	14–3	3–1	2nd	NCAA Division I 4th	4
2008–09	Mark Manning	17–3–1	3–1	1st	NCAA Division I 4th	4
2009–10	Mark Manning	9–11	0–4	5th	NCAA Division I T–12th	
2010–11	Mark Manning	14–5	2–2	4th	NCAA Division I 12th	13
Big Ten Conference (2011–present)
2011–12	Mark Manning	15–4	5–3	8th	NCAA Division I T–21st	8
2012–13	Mark Manning	11–6	4–4	7th	NCAA Division I 13th	12
2013–14	Mark Manning	12–2	6–2	5th	NCAA Division I 11th	8
2014–15	Mark Manning	14–1	8–1	7th	NCAA Division I 9th	11
2015–16	Mark Manning	11–6	5–4	4th	NCAA Division I 8th	12
2016–17	Mark Manning	12–4	6–3	4th	NCAA Division I 9th	5
2017–18	Mark Manning	10–4	7–2	5th	NCAA Division I 9th	13
2018–19	Mark Manning	12–5	5–4	5th	NCAA Division I 10th	8
2019–20	Mark Manning	11–3	6–3	2nd	Canceled (Note: Canceled due to the COVID-19 pandemic.)	4
2021	Mark Manning	7–1		3rd	NCAA Division I 12th	3
2021–22	Mark Manning	6–5	3–5	7th	NCAA Division I 5th	11
2022–23	Mark Manning	12–3	7–1	3rd	NCAA Division I 8th	4
2023–24	Mark Manning	12–2	6–2	3rd	NCAA Division I 9th	3
2024–25	Mark Manning	11–3	6–2	T–3rd	NCAA Division I runner-up	5
2025–26	Mark Manning	13–6	5–3	T–3rd	NCAA Division I 3rd	5

== International competition ==
=== Olympics ===
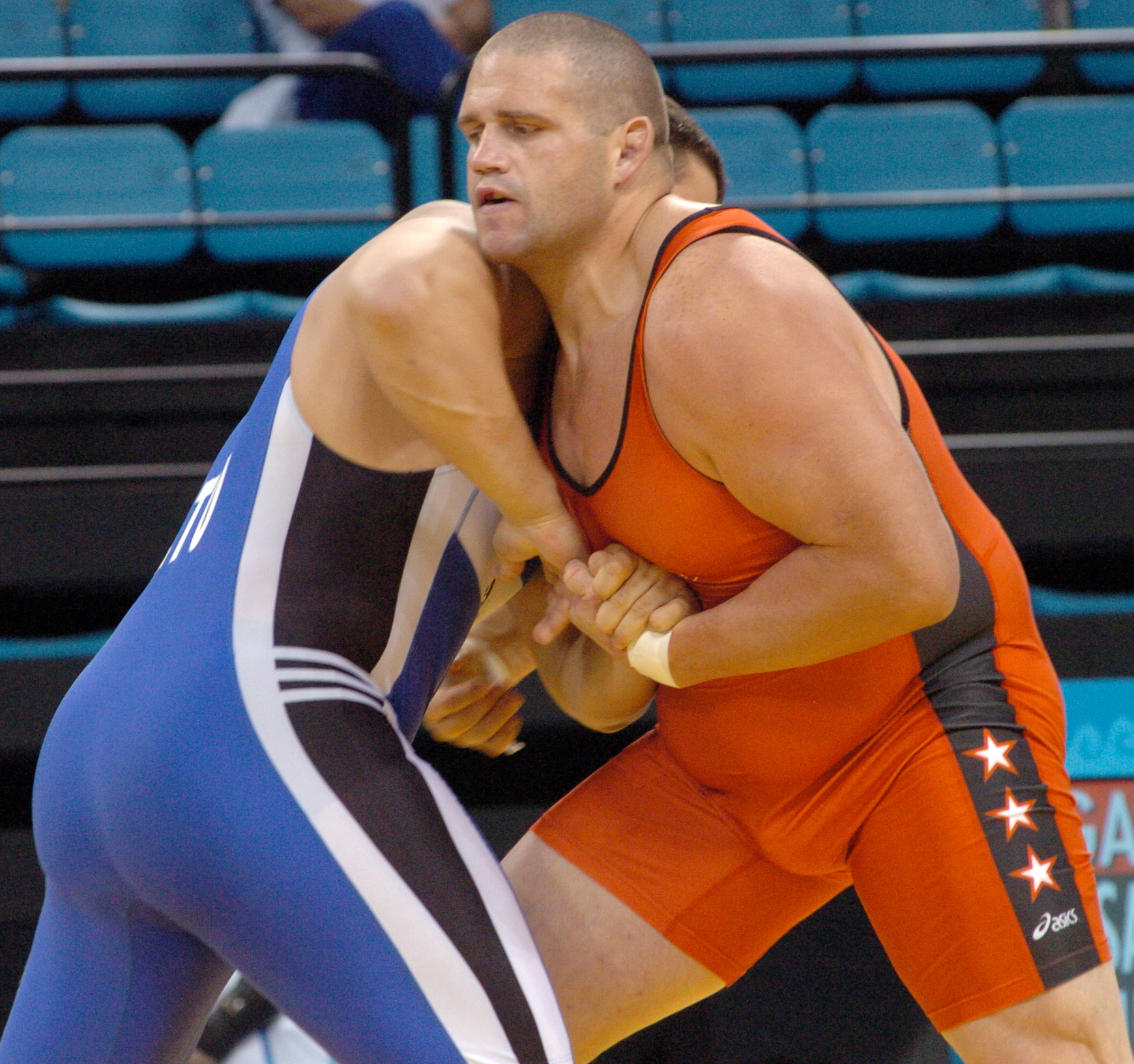
Rulon Gardner upset Aleksandr Karelin in the 2000 Summer Olympics to win Nebraska's first Olympic wrestling gold medal

Nine Nebraska wrestlers have combined to compete in thirteen Summer Olympiads, each representing the United States. The earliest of these was Adrian Brian, a featherweight freestyle wrestler who competed in the Greco-Roman division in Antwerp in 1920. Nebraska does not include Brian in its published records, but an Omaha World-Herald report prior to the 2016 Summer Olympics concluded Brian competed in at least one match in Antwerp.

Twin brothers Bill and Jim Scherr, both former NCAA champions, competed in the freestyle division in Seoul in 1988. Rulon Gardner won NU's first Olympic wrestling gold medal in Sydney in 2000, upsetting three-time defending gold medalist Aleksandr Karelin. It was one of just two losses Karelin suffered in his 889-match senior career, and is considered one of the biggest upsets in sports history. Jordan Burroughs won gold in London in 2012 but was upset while attempting to repeat as champion in Rio de Janeiro four years later and failed to medal.

Olympiad	City	Wrestler	Country	Event	Place
1920 (VII)	(Belgium) Antwerp	Adrian Brian	United States	Greco-Roman FWT	Did not place
1960 (XVII)	(Italy) Rome	Daniel Brand	United States	Freestyle LHWT	5th
1964 (XVIII)	(Japan) Tokyo	Daniel Brand	United States	Freestyle MWT	(bronze) Bronze
1964 (XVIII)	(Japan) Tokyo	Bob Pickens (Note: Pickens, the first African-American to represent the United States in Olympic wrestling, played football at Nebraska but did not wrestle at the school.)	United States	Greco-Roman HWT	6th
1988 (XXIV)	(South Korea) Seoul	Bill Scherr	United States	Freestyle 100 kg	(bronze) Bronze
1988 (XXIV)	(South Korea) Seoul	Jim Scherr	United States	Freestyle 90 kg	5th
2000 (XXVII)	(Australia) Sydney	Rulon Gardner	United States	Greco-Roman 130 kg	(gold) Gold
2000 (XXVII)	(Australia) Sydney	Matt Lindland	United States	Greco-Roman 76 kg	(silver) Silver
2004 (XXVIII)	(Greece) Athens	Rulon Gardner	United States	Greco-Roman 120 kg	(bronze) Bronze
2004 (XXVIII)	(Greece) Athens	Brad Vering	United States	Greco-Roman 84 kg	11th
2008 (XXIX)	(China) Beijing	Brad Vering	United States	Greco-Roman 84 kg	12th
2012 (XXX)	(United Kingdom) London	Jordan Burroughs	United States	Freestyle 74 kg	(gold) Gold
2016 (XXXI)	(Brazil) Rio de Janeiro	Jordan Burroughs	United States	Freestyle 74 kg	9th

=== World Championships ===
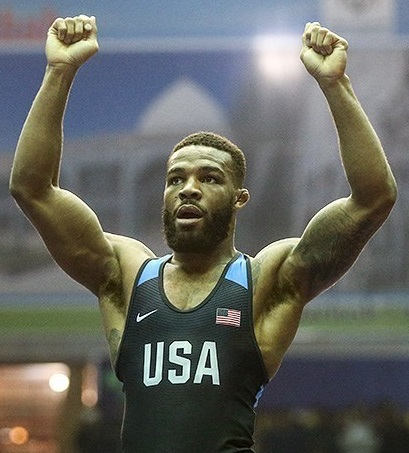
Jordan Burroughs won six gold medals at the World Wrestling Championships and is the most decorated American wrestler of all-time

Twelve Nebraska wrestlers have combined to compete in forty-seven events at the World Wrestling Championships, winning twenty-five medals. Burroughs's six gold medals are more than any other American in the competition's history.

Nebraska's World Wrestling Championship medalists
Wrestler	Championship	Event	Medal
(United States) Daniel Brand	1962 Toledo	Freestyle LHWT	(bronze) Bronze
(United States) James Raschke	1963 Sofia	Greco-Roman HWT	(bronze) Bronze
(United States) Bill Scherr	1985 Budapest	Freestyle 90 kg	(gold) Gold
(United States) Bill Scherr	1986 Budapest	Freestyle 100 kg	(silver) Silver
(United States) Bill Scherr	1987 Clermont-Ferrand	Freestyle 100 kg	(bronze) Bronze
(United States) Bill Scherr	1989 Martigny	Freestyle 100 kg	(silver) Silver
(United States) Jim Scherr	1986 Budapest	Freestyle 90 kg	(bronze) Bronze
(United States) Jim Scherr	1987 Clermont-Ferrand	Freestyle 90 kg	(silver) Silver
(United States) Jim Scherr	1989 Martigny	Freestyle 90 kg	(silver) Silver
(United States) Rulon Gardner	2001 Sofia	Greco-Roman 130 kg	(gold) Gold
(United States) Matt Lindland	2001 Sofia	Greco-Roman 85 kg	(silver) Silver
(United States) Justin Ruiz	2005 Budapest	Greco-Roman 96 kg	(bronze) Bronze
(United States) Tolly Thompson	2005 Budapest	Freestyle 120 kg	(bronze) Bronze
(United States) Brad Vering	2007 Baku	Greco-Roman 84 kg	(silver) Silver
(United States) Jordan Burroughs	2011 Istanbul	Freestyle 74 kg	(gold) Gold
(United States) Jordan Burroughs	2013 Budapest	Freestyle 74 kg	(gold) Gold
(United States) Jordan Burroughs	2014 Tashkent	Freestyle 74 kg	(bronze) Bronze
(United States) Jordan Burroughs	2015 Las Vegas	Freestyle 74 kg	(gold) Gold
(United States) Jordan Burroughs	2017 Paris	Freestyle 74 kg	(gold) Gold
(United States) Jordan Burroughs	2018 Budapest	Freestyle 74 kg	(bronze) Bronze
(United States) Jordan Burroughs	2019 Astana	Freestyle 74 kg	(bronze) Bronze
(United States) Jordan Burroughs	2021 Oslo	Freestyle 79 kg	(gold) Gold
(United States) Jordan Burroughs	2022 Belgrade	Freestyle 79 kg	(gold) Gold
(United States) James Green	2015 Las Vegas	Freestyle 70 kg	(bronze) Bronze
(United States) James Green	2017 Paris	Freestyle 70 kg	(silver) Silver

== Professional wrestling ==
Mike DiBiase won three heavyweight conference championships during his collegiate career. Following a brief amateur boxing career, "Iron Mike" entered professional wrestling. He participated in the American Wrestling Association until his death in 1969. He was the adoptive father of famed WWE performer Ted DiBiase, known as "the Million Dollar Man."

James Raschke wrestled and played left tackle during his time at Nebraska. He gave himself the title "Baron" upon entering professional wrestling and became famous for his violent takedown nicknamed "the claw."

Gary Albright medaled in the Big Eight Championship in 1984 and 1986, and began his professional wrestling career with Stampede Wrestling in 1988 using the stage name "Vokhan Singh." He became popular after signing with All Japan Pro Wrestling, winning two AJPW World Tag Team Championships. He returned to the United States in 1996, dying of a heart attack during a performance in 2000 at age thirty-six.
