= 2023 NCAA Division I Wrestling Championships =

American collegiate wrestling tournament

- Teams: 62
- Format: Knockout
- Finals site: Tulsa, Oklahoma; BOK Center
- Champions: Penn State (11th title)
- Runner-up: Iowa
- Winning coach: Cael Sanderson (10th title)
- Television: ESPN Networks

The 2023 NCAA Division I Wrestling Championships took place from March 16–18, 2023, in Tulsa, Oklahoma at the BOK Center. The tournament is the 92nd NCAA Division I Wrestling Championship.

== Team results ==
- Note: Top 10 only (according to FloWrestling)
- (H): Team from hosting U.S. state

Rank	Team	Points
1	Penn State	137.5
2	Iowa	82.5
3	Cornell	76.5
4	Ohio State	70.5
5	Missouri	64.5
6	Michigan	58.5
7	Arizona State	55
8	Nebraska	54
9	Virginia Tech	49
10	North Carolina State	49

- Note: Top 10 only (according to FloWrestling)
- (H): Team from hosting U.S. state

== Individual results ==
Weight	Champion	School	Score	Runner-up	School
125	Pat Glory	Princeton	4-1	Matt Ramos	Purdue
133	Vito Arujau	Cornell	10-4	Roman Bravo-Young	Penn State
141	Andrew Alirez	Northern Colorado	6-4	Real Woods	Iowa
149	Yianni Diakomihalis	Cornell	4-2	Sammy Sasso	Ohio State
157	Austin O'Connor	North Carolina	6-2	Levi Haines	Penn State
165	Keegan O'Toole	Missouri	8-2	David Carr	Iowa State
174	Carter Starocci	Penn State	FALL	Mikey Labriola	Nebraska
184	Aaron Brooks	Penn State	7-2	Parker Keckeisen	Northern Iowa
197	Nino Bonaccorsi	Pitt	5-3	Tanner Sloan	SD State
285	Mason Parris	Michigan	5-1	Greg Kerkvliet	Penn State

4x Champion: Yianni Diakomihalis
3x Champions: Carter Starocci, Aaron Brooks
2x Champions: Austin O'Connor, Keegan O'Toole
All information from NCAA.com.

Complete bracket at NCAA.com
