= Wrestling at the 1960 Summer Olympics – Men's Greco-Roman bantamweight =

Wrestling at the Olympics

Men's Greco-Roman bantamweight at the Games of the XVII Olympiad
- Venue: Basilica of Maxentius
- Dates: 26–31 August 1960
- Competitors: 28 from 28 nations

Medalists
1st place, gold medalist(s)		Oleg Karavaev	Soviet Union
2nd place, silver medalist(s)		Ion Cernea	Romania
3rd place, bronze medalist(s)		Dinko Petrov	Bulgaria

The men's Greco-Roman bantamweight competition at the 1960 Summer Olympics in Rome took place from 26 to 31 August at the Basilica of Maxentius. Nations were limited to one competitor. Bantamweight was the second-lightest category, including wrestlers weighing 52 to 57 kilograms (114.6 to 125.7 lb).

== Competition format ==
This Greco-Roman wrestling competition continued to use the "bad points" elimination system introduced at the 1928 Summer Olympics for Greco-Roman and at the 1932 Summer Olympics for freestyle wrestling, though adjusted the point values slightly. Wins by fall continued to be worth 0 points and wins by decision continued to be worth 1 point. Losses by fall, however, were now worth 4 points (up from 3). Losses by decision were worth 3 points (consistent with most prior years, though in some losses by split decision had been worth only 2 points). Ties were now allowed, worth 2 points for each wrestler. The elimination threshold was also increased from 5 points to 6 points. The medal round concept, used in 1952 and 1956 requiring a round-robin amongst the medalists even if one or more finished a round with enough points for elimination, was used only if exactly three wrestlers remained after a round—if two competitors remained, they faced off head-to-head; if only one, he was the gold medalist.

== Results ==
=== Round 1 ===
Cañete withdrew after his bout. Schlechter was injured and could not continue.

Bouts

Winner	Nation	Victory Type	Loser	Nation
Ion Cernea	Romania	Fall	Michel Ben Akoun	Morocco
Imre Hódos	Hungary	Fall	Loek Alflen	Netherlands
Richard Debrunner	Switzerland	Tie	Reino Tuominen	Finland
Masamitsu Ichiguchi	Japan	Fall	Larry Lauchle	United States
Gilberto Gramellini	Italy	Decision	Bernard Knitter	Poland
Yaşar Yılmaz	Turkey	Decision	Kamal El-Sayed Ali	United Arab Republic
Gilbert Dubier	France	Decision	Ewald Tauer	United Team of Germany
Oleg Karavaev	Soviet Union	Fall	John Tveiten	Norway
Stipan Dora	Yugoslavia	Decision	Aimé Verhoeven	Belgium
Jiří Švec	Czechoslovakia	Decision	Ali Bani Hashemi	Iran
Franz Brunner	Austria	Decision	Mikhail Theodoropoulos	Greece
Edvin Vesterby	Sweden	Decision	Orlando Gonçalves	Portugal
Dinko Petrov	Bulgaria	Fall	François Schlechter	Luxembourg
Michel Nakouzi	Lebanon	Decision	Santiago Cañete	Spain

Points

Rank	Wrestler	Nation	Start	Earned	Total
1	Ion Cernea	Romania	0	0	0
1	Imre Hódos	Hungary	0	0	0
1	Masamitsu Ichiguchi	Japan	0	0	0
1	Oleg Karavaev	Soviet Union	0	0	0
1	Dinko Petrov	Bulgaria	0	0	0
6	Franz Brunner	Austria	0	1	1
6	Stipan Dora	Yugoslavia	0	1	1
6	Gilbert Dubier	France	0	1	1
6	Gilberto Gramellini	Italy	0	1	1
6	Michel Nakouzi	Lebanon	0	1	1
6	Jiří Švec	Czechoslovakia	0	1	1
6	Edvin Vesterby	Sweden	0	1	1
6	Yaşar Yılmaz	Turkey	0	1	1
14	Richard Debrunner	Switzerland	0	2	2
14	Reino Tuominen	Finland	0	2	2
16	Kamal El-Sayed Ali	United Arab Republic	0	3	3
16	Ali Bani Hashemi	Iran	0	3	3
16	Orlando Gonçalves	Portugal	0	3	3
16	Bernard Knitter	Poland	0	3	3
16	Ewald Tauer	United Team of Germany	0	3	3
16	Mikhail Theodoropoulos	Greece	0	3	3
16	Aimé Verhoeven	Belgium	0	3	3
23	Loek Alflen	Netherlands	0	4	4
23	Michel Ben Akoun	Morocco	0	4	4
23	Larry Lauchle	United States	0	4	4
23	John Tveiten	Norway	0	4	4
27	Santiago Cañete	Spain	0	3	3*
28	François Schlechter	Luxembourg	0	4	4*

=== Round 2 ===
Bouts

Winner	Nation	Victory Type	Loser	Nation
Ion Cernea	Romania	Tie	Imre Hódos	Hungary
Loek Alflen	Netherlands	Fall	Michel Ben Akoun	Morocco
Gilberto Gramellini	Italy	Fall	Richard Debrunner	Switzerland
Bernard Knitter	Poland	Fall	Reino Tuominen	Finland
Masamitsu Ichiguchi	Japan	Decision	Kamal El-Sayed Ali	United Arab Republic
Yaşar Yılmaz	Turkey	Fall	Larry Lauchle	United States
Michel Nakouzi	Lebanon	Decision	Gilbert Dubier	France
Ewald Tauer	United Team of Germany	Decision	John Tveiten	Norway
Oleg Karavaev	Soviet Union	Fall	Aimé Verhoeven	Belgium
Stipan Dora	Yugoslavia	Decision	Ali Bani Hashemi	Iran
Jiří Švec	Czechoslovakia	Decision	Mikhail Theodoropoulos	Greece
Edvin Vesterby	Sweden	Decision	Franz Brunner	Austria
Dinko Petrov	Bulgaria	Decision	Orlando Gonçalves	Portugal

Points

Rank	Wrestler	Nation	Start	Earned	Total
1	Oleg Karavaev	Soviet Union	0	0	0
2	Gilberto Gramellini	Italy	1	0	1
2	Masamitsu Ichiguchi	Japan	0	1	1
2	Dinko Petrov	Bulgaria	0	1	1
2	Yaşar Yılmaz	Turkey	1	0	1
6	Ion Cernea	Romania	0	2	2
6	Stipan Dora	Yugoslavia	1	1	2
6	Imre Hódos	Hungary	0	2	2
6	Michel Nakouzi	Lebanon	1	1	2
6	Jiří Švec	Czechoslovakia	1	1	2
6	Edvin Vesterby	Sweden	1	1	2
12	Bernard Knitter	Poland	3	0	3
13	Loek Alflen	Netherlands	4	0	4
13	Franz Brunner	Austria	1	3	4
13	Gilbert Dubier	France	1	3	4
13	Ewald Tauer	United Team of Germany	3	1	4
17	Kamal El-Sayed Ali	United Arab Republic	3	3	6
17	Ali Bani Hashemi	Iran	3	3	6
17	Richard Debrunner	Switzerland	2	4	6
17	Orlando Gonçalves	Portugal	3	3	6
17	Mikhail Theodoropoulos	Greece	3	3	6
17	Reino Tuominen	Finland	2	4	6
23	John Tveiten	Norway	4	3	7
23	Aimé Verhoeven	Belgium	3	4	7
25	Michel Ben Akoun	Morocco	4	4	8
25	Larry Lauchle	United States	4	4	8

=== Round 3 ===
Bouts

Winner	Nation	Victory Type	Loser	Nation
Ion Cernea	Romania	Decision	Loek Alflen	Netherlands
Imre Hódos	Hungary	Tie	Gilberto Gramellini	Italy
Bernard Knitter	Poland	Tie	Masamitsu Ichiguchi	Japan
Yaşar Yılmaz	Turkey	Decision	Gilbert Dubier	France
Michel Nakouzi	Lebanon	Decision	Ewald Tauer	United Team of Germany
Oleg Karavaev	Soviet Union	Decision	Stipan Dora	Yugoslavia
Jiří Švec	Czechoslovakia	Decision	Franz Brunner	Austria
Dinko Petrov	Bulgaria	Decision	Edvin Vesterby	Sweden

Points

Rank	Wrestler	Nation	Start	Earned	Total
1	Oleg Karavaev	Soviet Union	0	1	1
2	Dinko Petrov	Bulgaria	1	1	2
2	Yaşar Yılmaz	Turkey	1	1	2
4	Ion Cernea	Romania	2	1	3
4	Gilberto Gramellini	Italy	1	2	3
4	Masamitsu Ichiguchi	Japan	1	2	3
4	Michel Nakouzi	Lebanon	2	1	3
4	Jiří Švec	Czechoslovakia	2	1	3
9	Imre Hódos	Hungary	2	2	4
10	Stipan Dora	Yugoslavia	2	3	5
10	Bernard Knitter	Poland	3	2	5
10	Edvin Vesterby	Sweden	2	3	5
13	Loek Alflen	Netherlands	4	3	7
13	Franz Brunner	Austria	4	3	7
13	Gilbert Dubier	France	4	3	7
13	Ewald Tauer	United Team of Germany	4	3	7

=== Round 4 ===
The Official Report shows Vesterby (correctly) at 5 points after round 3, following 2 wins by decision and a loss by decision. After round 4, however, Vesterby is shown at 4 points even though his win by fall should have kept him at 5. There is no explanation for a wrestler receiving a reduction in bad points.

Bouts

Winner	Nation	Victory Type	Loser	Nation
Ion Cernea	Romania	Decision	Gilberto Gramellini	Italy
Bernard Knitter	Poland	Fall	Imre Hódos	Hungary
Masamitsu Ichiguchi	Japan	Decision	Yaşar Yılmaz	Turkey
Oleg Karavaev	Soviet Union	Decision	Michel Nakouzi	Lebanon
Edvin Vesterby	Sweden	Fall	Stipan Dora	Yugoslavia
Jiří Švec	Czechoslovakia	Tie	Dinko Petrov	Bulgaria

Points

Rank	Wrestler	Nation	Start	Earned	Total
1	Oleg Karavaev	Soviet Union	1	1	2
2	Ion Cernea	Romania	3	1	4
2	Masamitsu Ichiguchi	Japan	3	1	4
2	Dinko Petrov	Bulgaria	2	2	4
5	Bernard Knitter	Poland	5	0	5
5	Jiří Švec	Czechoslovakia	3	2	5
5	Edvin Vesterby	Sweden	5	0	4*
5	Yaşar Yılmaz	Turkey	2	3	5
9	Gilberto Gramellini	Italy	3	3	6
9	Michel Nakouzi	Lebanon	3	3	6
11	Imre Hódos	Hungary	4	4	8
12	Stipan Dora	Yugoslavia	5	4	9

=== Round 5 ===
Vesterby's inexplicably reduced point total put him in a tie with Petrov for the bronze medal at 6 points. This tie was broken on head-to-head results; Petrov had defeated Vesterby in round 3. Vesterby would have finished in 4th place even were it not for the point reduction. Švec and Yılmaz were the ones ultimately affected by it, as they would have finished tied with Vesterby for 4th rather than tied only with each other for 5th.

Bouts

Winner	Nation	Victory Type	Loser	Nation
Ion Cernea	Romania	Decision	Bernard Knitter	Poland
Oleg Karavaev	Soviet Union	Fall	Masamitsu Ichiguchi	Japan
Yaşar Yılmaz	Turkey	Tie	Dinko Petrov	Bulgaria
Jiří Švec	Czechoslovakia	Tie	Edvin Vesterby	Sweden

Points

Rank	Wrestler	Nation	Start	Earned	Total
1	Oleg Karavaev	Soviet Union	2	0	2
2	Ion Cernea	Romania	4	1	5
3rd place, bronze medalist(s)	Dinko Petrov	Bulgaria	4	2	6
4	Edvin Vesterby	Sweden	4*	2	6*
5	Jiří Švec	Czechoslovakia	5	2	7
5	Yaşar Yılmaz	Turkey	5	2	7
7	Masamitsu Ichiguchi	Japan	4	4	8
7	Bernard Knitter	Poland	5	3	8

=== Round 6 ===
Bouts

Winner	Nation	Victory Type	Loser	Nation
Oleg Karavaev	Soviet Union	Decision	Ion Cernea	Romania

Points

Rank	Wrestler	Nation	Start	Earned	Total
1st place, gold medalist(s)	Oleg Karavaev	Soviet Union	2	1	3
2nd place, silver medalist(s)	Ion Cernea	Romania	4	3	7
