= Wrestling at the 1964 Summer Olympics – Men's Greco-Roman bantamweight =

Wrestling at the Olympics

Men's Greco-Roman bantamweight at the Games of the XVIII Olympiad
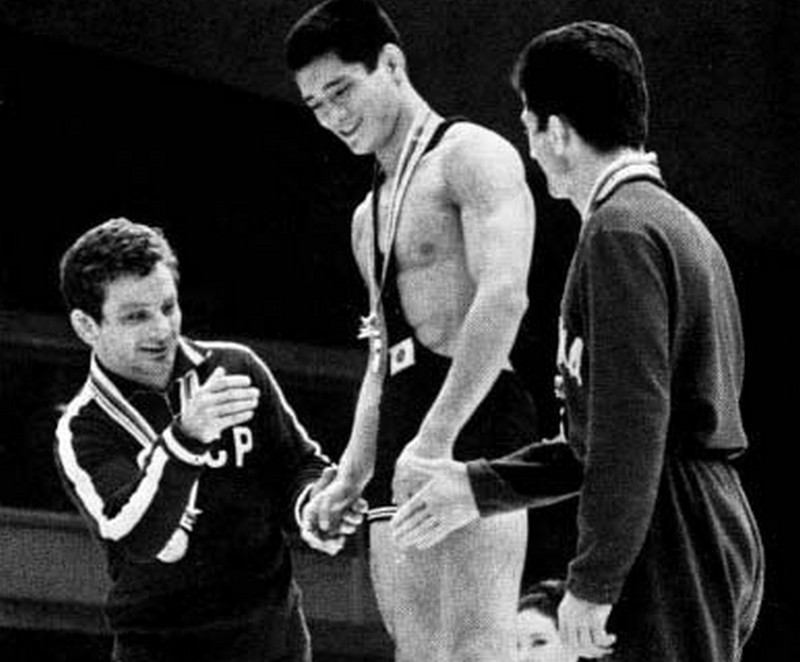
- Venue: Komazawa Gymnasium
- Dates: 16–19 October 1964
- Competitors: 18 from 18 nations

Medalists
1st place, gold medalist(s)		Masamitsu Ichiguchi	Japan
2nd place, silver medalist(s)		Vladlen Trostianskiy	Soviet Union
3rd place, bronze medalist(s)		Ion Cernea	Romania

The men's Greco-Roman bantamweight competition at the 1964 Summer Olympics in Tokyo took place from 16 to 19 October at the Komazawa Gymnasium. Nations were limited to one competitor. Bantamweight was the second-lightest category, including wrestlers weighing 52 to 57 kilograms (114.6 to 125.7 lb).

== Competition format ==
This Greco-Roman wrestling competition continued to use the "bad points" elimination system introduced at the 1928 Summer Olympics for Greco-Roman and at the 1932 Summer Olympics for freestyle wrestling, as adjusted at the 1960 Summer Olympics. Each bout awarded 4 points. If the victory was by fall, the winner received 0 and the loser 4. If the victory was by decision, the winner received 1 and the loser 3. If the bout was tied, each wrestler received 2 points. A wrestler who accumulated 6 or more points was eliminated. Rounds continued until there were 3 or fewer uneliminated wrestlers. If only 1 wrestler remained, he received the gold medal. If 2 wrestlers remained, point totals were ignored and they faced each other for gold and silver (if they had already wrestled each other, that result was used). If 3 wrestlers remained, point totals were ignored and a round-robin was held among those 3 to determine medals (with previous head-to-head results, if any, counting for this round-robin).

== Results ==
=== Round 1 ===
Tumasis withdrew after his bout.

Bouts

Winner	Nation	Victory Type	Loser	Nation
Fritz Stange	United Team of Germany	Decision	Andy Fitch	United States
Masamitsu Ichiguchi	Japan	Fall	Nour Ullah Noor	Afghanistan
Michele Toma	Italy	Decision	Tortillano Tumasis	Philippines
János Varga	Hungary	Tie	Ion Cernea	Romania
Bernard Knitter	Poland	Decision	Siavash Shafizadeh	Iran
Jiří Švec	Czechoslovakia	Fall	Jang I-hyeon	South Korea
Bishambar Singh	India	Decision	Moises López	Mexico
Vladlen Trostianskiy	Soviet Union	Decision	Ünver Beşergil	Turkey
Tsvyatko Pashkulev	Bulgaria	Decision	Kamal El-Sayed Ali	Egypt

Points

Rank	Wrestler	Nation	R1
1	Masamitsu Ichiguchi	Japan	0
1	Jiří Švec	Czechoslovakia	0
3	Bernard Knitter	Poland	1
3	Tsvyatko Pashkulev	Bulgaria	1
3	Bishambar Singh	India	1
3	Fritz Stange	United Team of Germany	1
3	Michele Toma	Italy	1
3	Vladlen Trostianskiy	Soviet Union	1
9	Ion Cernea	Romania	2
9	János Varga	Hungary	2
11	Kamal El-Sayed Ali	Egypt	3
11	Ünver Beşergil	Turkey	3
11	Andy Fitch	United States	3
11	Moisés López	Mexico	3
11	Siavash Shafizadeh	Iran	3
16	Jang I-hyeon	South Korea	4
16	Nour Ullah Noor	Afghanistan	4
18	Tortillano Tumasis	Philippines	3*

=== Round 2 ===
Four wrestlers were eliminated, leaving 13 in competition. Švec was the only one to have 0 points.

Bouts

Winner	Nation	Victory Type	Loser	Nation
Andy Fitch	United States	Decision	Nour Ullah Noor	Afghanistan
Masamitsu Ichiguchi	Japan	Decision	Fritz Stange	United Team of Germany
János Varga	Hungary	Decision	Michele Toma	Italy
Ion Cernea	Romania	Decision	Bernard Knitter	Poland
Jiří Švec	Czechoslovakia	Fall	Siavash Shafizadeh	Iran
Ünver Beşergil	Turkey	Fall	Jang I-hyeon	South Korea
Vladlen Trostianskiy	Soviet Union	Decision	Bishambar Singh	India
Kamal El-Sayed Ali	Egypt	Decision	Moises López	Mexico
Tsvyatko Pashkulev	Bulgaria	Bye	N/A	N/A

Points

Rank	Wrestler	Nation	R1	R2	Total
1	Jiří Švec	Czechoslovakia	0	0	0
2	Masamitsu Ichiguchi	Japan	0	1	1
2	Tsvyatko Pashkulev	Bulgaria	1	0	1
4	Vladlen Trostianskiy	Soviet Union	1	1	2
5	Ünver Beşergil	Turkey	3	0	3
5	Ion Cernea	Romania	2	1	3
5	János Varga	Hungary	2	1	3
8	Kamal El-Sayed Ali	Egypt	3	1	4
8	Andy Fitch	United States	3	1	4
8	Bernard Knitter	Poland	1	3	4
8	Bishambar Singh	India	1	3	4
8	Fritz Stange	United Team of Germany	1	3	4
8	Michele Toma	Italy	1	3	4
14	Moisés López	Mexico	3	3	6
15	Nour Ullah Noor	Afghanistan	4	3	7
15	Siavash Shafizadeh	Iran	3	4	7
17	Jang I-hyeon	South Korea	4	4	8

=== Round 3 ===
Five wrestlers were eliminated, leaving 8 in contention. Švec's first loss allowed Ichiguchi to take the lead at 2 points.

Bouts

Winner	Nation	Victory Type	Loser	Nation
Fritz Stange	United Team of Germany	Fall	Michele Toma	Italy
Masamitsu Ichiguchi	Japan	Decision	János Varga	Hungary
Ion Cernea	Romania	Decision	Jiří Švec	Czechoslovakia
Vladlen Trostianskiy	Soviet Union	Decision	Bernard Knitter	Poland
Tsvyatko Pashkulev	Bulgaria	Tie	Andy Fitch	United States
Ünver Beşergil	Turkey	Decision	Bishambar Singh	India
Kamal El-Sayed Ali	Egypt	Bye	N/A	N/A

Points

Rank	Wrestler	Nation	R1	R2	R3	Total
1	Masamitsu Ichiguchi	Japan	0	1	1	2
2	Tsvyatko Pashkulev	Bulgaria	1	0	2	3
2	Jiří Švec	Czechoslovakia	0	0	3	3
2	Vladlen Trostianskiy	Soviet Union	1	1	1	3
5	Kamal El-Sayed Ali	Egypt	3	1	0	4
5	Ünver Beşergil	Turkey	3	0	1	4
5	Ion Cernea	Romania	2	1	1	4
5	Fritz Stange	United Team of Germany	1	3	0	4
9	Andy Fitch	United States	3	1	2	6
9	János Varga	Hungary	2	1	3	6
11	Bernard Knitter	Poland	1	3	3	7
11	Bishambar Singh	India	1	3	3	7
13	Michele Toma	Italy	1	3	4	8

=== Round 4 ===
The tie between Ali and Stange eliminated both men; the tie between Švec and Trostianskiy eliminated neither. Beşergil and Pashkulev were also eliminated; Beşergil finished 8th while the other three men eliminated in this round tied for 5th place.

Bouts

Winner	Nation	Victory Type	Loser	Nation
Kamal El-Sayed Ali	Egypt	Tie	Fritz Stange	United Team of Germany
Masamitsu Ichiguchi	Japan	Decision	Tsvyatko Pashkulev	Bulgaria
Ion Cernea	Romania	Decision	Ünver Beşergil	Turkey
Jiří Švec	Czechoslovakia	Tie	Vladlen Trostianskiy	Soviet Union

Points

Rank	Wrestler	Nation	R1	R2	R3	R4	Total
1	Masamitsu Ichiguchi	Japan	0	1	1	1	3
2	Ion Cernea	Romania	2	1	1	1	5
2	Jiří Švec	Czechoslovakia	0	0	3	2	5
2	Vladlen Trostianskiy	Soviet Union	1	1	1	2	5
5	Kamal El-Sayed Ali	Egypt	3	1	0	2	6
5	Tsvyatko Pashkulev	Bulgaria	1	0	2	3	6
5	Fritz Stange	United Team of Germany	1	3	0	2	6
8	Ünver Beşergil	Turkey	3	0	1	3	7

=== Round 5 ===
Three out of the four wrestlers were eliminated in this round, including the undefeated Trostianskiy (four wins by decision, one tie) who took silver. Ichiguchi, as the only man left, won the gold medal. The bronze medal tie was decided by the third-round head-to-head matchup between Cernea and Švec, which Švec had won.

Bouts

Winner	Nation	Victory Type	Loser	Nation
Masamitsu Ichiguchi	Japan	Decision	Jiří Švec	Czechoslovakia
Vladlen Trostianskiy	Soviet Union	Decision	Ion Cernea	Romania

Points

Rank	Wrestler	Nation	R1	R2	R3	R4	R5	Total
1st place, gold medalist(s)	Masamitsu Ichiguchi	Japan	0	1	1	1	1	4
2nd place, silver medalist(s)	Vladlen Trostianskiy	Soviet Union	1	1	1	2	1	6
3rd place, bronze medalist(s)	Ion Cernea	Romania	2	1	1	1	3	8
4	Jiří Švec	Czechoslovakia	0	0	3	2	3	8
