= 2014–15 Eredivisie =

59th season of the Eredivisie

Eredivisie
- Season: 2014–15
- Dates: 8 August 2014 – 17 May 2015
- Champions: PSV (22nd title)
- Relegated: NAC Breda; Go Ahead Eagles; FC Dordrecht
- Champions League: PSV; Ajax
- Europa League: AZ; Groningen; Go Ahead Eagles; Vitesse
- Matches: 306
- Goals: 942 (3.08 per match)
- Top goalscorer: Memphis Depay (22 goals)
- Biggest home win: PSV 6–1 NAC Breda (16 August 2014); Vitesse Arnhem 6–1; ADO Den Haag (3 October 2014); Heracles 6–1; NAC Breda (4 October 2014); Ajax 5–0 Willem II (6 December 2014); PSV 5–0 Go Ahead Eagles (20 December 2014); Utrecht 6–1 Dordrecht (15 February 2015)
- Biggest away win: Excelsior 0–5 PEC Zwolle (30 November 2014); Twente 0–5 PSV (4 April 2015)
- Highest scoring: NAC Breda 4–5 Groningen (17 May 2015)
- Longest winning run: 10 games PSV
- Longest unbeaten run: 17 games PSV
- Longest winless run: 17 games Dordrecht
- Longest losing run: 9 games Dordrecht
- Highest attendance: 52,472; Ajax 0–0 Feyenoord (25 January 2015)
- Lowest attendance: 3,149; Excelsior 3–1 Heracles (30 August 2014)
- Total attendance: 5,727,077
- Average attendance: 18,715

The 2014–15 Eredivisie season was the 59th season of the Eredivisie since its establishment in 1955. On 18 April 2015, PSV were confirmed as champions of the season, thus ending the four-year reign of Ajax.

== Teams ==
A total of 18 teams took part in the league: The best fifteen teams from the 2013–14 season, two promotion/relegation playoff winners and the 2013–14 Eerste Divisie champions.

There are three teams that played in the 2013–14 Eerste Divisie that were promoted to the Eredivisie for the 2014–15 season. Willem II returned to the Eredivisie after just one season by winning its first Eerste Divisie title in 49 years. Meanwhile, FC Dordrecht and Excelsior navigated to the promotion/relegation playoffs to reach the Eredivisie, with both clubs having received byes after finishing second and third in the Eerste Divisie. FC Dordrecht swept both legs against VVV-Venlo 5–2 on aggregate in the second round before facing another Eerste Divisie club for a spot in the Eredivisie (after Sparta Rotterdam sent NEC Nijmegen into relegation). FC Dordrecht won 5–3 on aggregate to return to the Eredivisie for the first time in 19 years.

Excelsior returned after two seasons in the Eerste Divisie by first overcoming FC Den Bosch 5–2 on aggregate before relegating RKC Waalwijk from the league by winning 4–2 on aggregate.

Location of teams in Eredivisie 2014–15
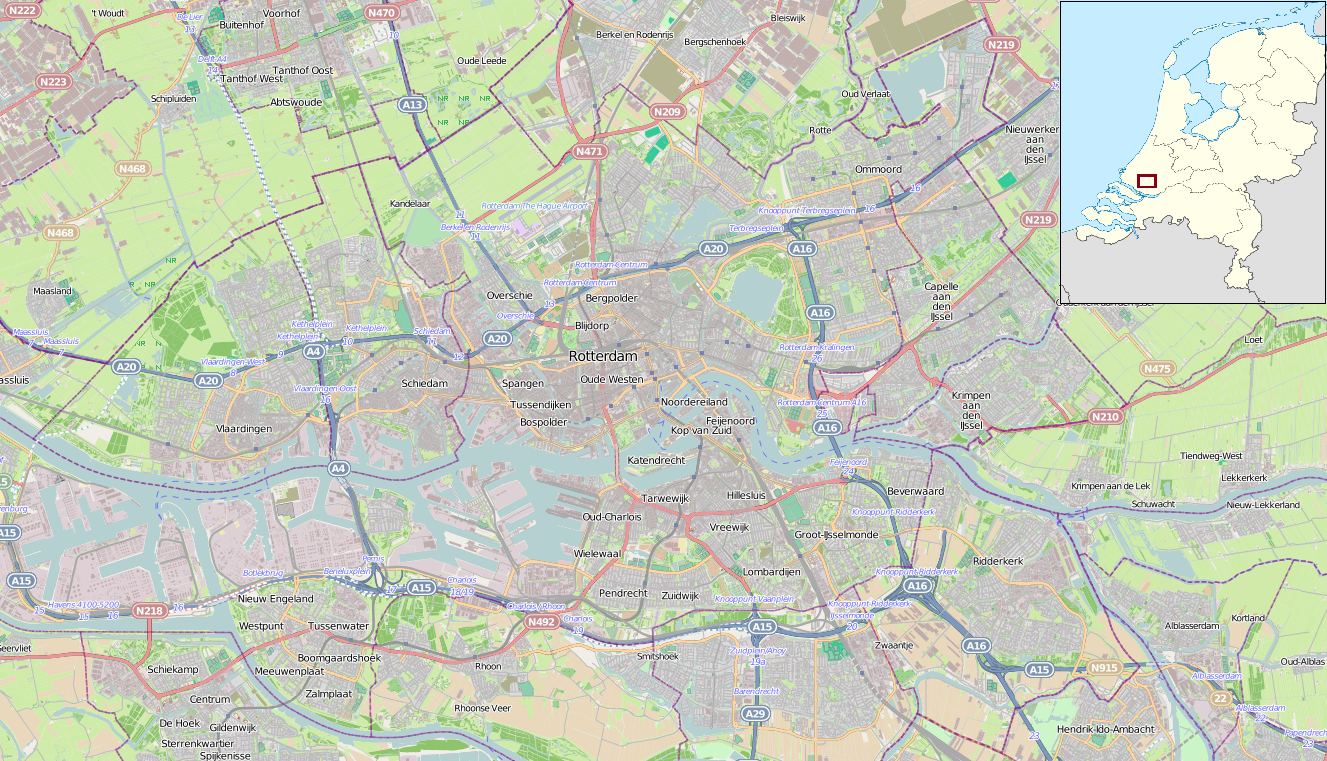
Rotterdam Eredivisie football clubs

Club	Location	Venue	Capacity
ADO Den Haag	The Hague	Kyocera Stadion	15,000
Ajax	Amsterdam	Amsterdam ArenA	53,052
AZ	Alkmaar	AFAS Stadion	17,023
Cambuur	Leeuwarden	Cambuur Stadion	10,250
Dordrecht	Dordrecht	GN Bouw Stadion	4,088
Excelsior	Rotterdam	Stadion Woudestein	3,531
Feyenoord	Rotterdam	De Kuip	51,177
Go Ahead Eagles	Deventer	Adelaarshorst	8,000
Groningen	Groningen	Euroborg	22,550
Heerenveen	Heerenveen	Abe Lenstra Stadion	26,100
Heracles Almelo	Almelo	Polman Stadion	8,500
NAC Breda	Breda	Rat Verlegh Stadion	19,000
PEC Zwolle	Zwolle	IJsseldelta Stadion	12,500
PSV	Eindhoven	Philips Stadion	36,000
Twente	Enschede	De Grolsch Veste	30,205
Utrecht	Utrecht	Stadion Galgenwaard	23,750
Vitesse Arnhem	Arnhem	GelreDome	25,000
Willem II	Tilburg	Koning Willem II Stadion	14,637

=== Personnel and kits ===
Note: Flags indicate national team as has been defined under FIFA eligibility rules. Players and managers may hold more than one non-FIFA nationality.

Team	Manager	Kit manufacturer	Shirt sponsor
ADO Den Haag	(Netherlands) Henk Fräser	Erreà	Basic-Fit Fitness
Ajax	(Netherlands) Frank de Boer	adidas	Ziggo
AZ	(Netherlands) John van den Brom	Macron	AFAS software
Cambuur	(Netherlands) Henk de Jong	Quick	Bouwgroep Dijkstra Draisma
Dordrecht	(Netherlands) Jan Everse	Macron	Riwal
Excelsior	(Netherlands) Marinus Dijkhuizen	Masita	DSW Zorgverzekeraar
Feyenoord	(Netherlands) Fred Rutten	adidas	Opel
Go Ahead Eagles	(Netherlands) Dennis Demmers	hummel	Drukwerkdeal.nl
Groningen	(Netherlands) Erwin van de Looi	Masita	Essent
Heerenveen	(Netherlands) Dwight Lodeweges	Jako	Univé
Heracles Almelo	(Netherlands) John Stegeman	Erima	TenCate
NAC Breda	(Netherlands) Robert Maaskant	Umbro	Into Telecom
PEC Zwolle	(Netherlands) Ron Jans	Patrick	Compello
PSV	(Netherlands) Phillip Cocu	Nike	Philips
Twente	(Netherlands) Alfred Schreuder	Nike	XXImo
Utrecht	(Netherlands) Rob Alflen	hummel	HealthCity
Vitesse	(Netherlands) Peter Bosz	Macron	Truphone
Willem II	(Netherlands) Jurgen Streppel	Robey	Tricorp

=== Managerial changes ===
Team	Outgoing manager	Manner of departure	Date of vacancy	Position in table	Replaced by	Date of appointment
Heerenveen	(Netherlands) Marco van Basten	End of contract	1 July 2014	Pre-season	(Netherlands) Dwight Lodeweges	1 July 2014
AZ	(Netherlands) Dick Advocaat	End of contract	1 July 2014	Pre-season	(Netherlands) Marco van Basten	1 July 2014
Feyenoord	(Netherlands) Ronald Koeman	End of contract	1 July 2014	Pre-season	(Netherlands) Fred Rutten	1 July 2014
Utrecht	(Netherlands) Jan Wouters	Mutual consent	1 July 2014	Pre-season	(Netherlands) Rob Alflen	1 July 2014
Dordrecht	(Netherlands) Harry van den Ham	End of contract	1 July 2014	Pre-season	(Netherlands) Ernie Brandts	1 July 2014
Heracles Almelo	(Netherlands) Jan de Jonge	Sacked	31 August 2014	18th	(Netherlands) John Stegeman	17 September 2014
AZ	(Netherlands) Marco van Basten	Mutual consent	16 September 2014	12th	(Netherlands) John van den Brom	29 September 2014
NAC Breda	(Serbia) Nebojša Gudelj	Sacked	13 October 2014	15th	(Netherlands) Eric Hellemons (interim)	14 October 2014
NAC Breda	(Netherlands) Eric Hellemons	Sacked	2 January 2015	17th	(Netherlands) Robert Maaskant	3 January 2015
Dordrecht	(Netherlands) Ernie Brandts	Sacked	19 February 2015	18th	(Netherlands) Jan Everse (interim)	10 March 2015
Go Ahead Eagles	(Netherlands) Foeke Booy	Sacked	22 March 2015	17th	(Netherlands) Dennis Demmers (interim)	22 March 2015
Feyenoord	(Netherlands) Fred Rutten	Sacked	17 May 2015	4th	(Netherlands) Giovanni van Bronckhorst	17 May 2015

== Standings ==
Pos	Team	Pld	W	D	L	GF	GA	GD	Pts	Qualification or relegation
1	PSV (C)	34	29	1	4	92	31	+61	88	Qualification for the Champions League group stage
2	Ajax	34	21	8	5	69	29	+40	71	Qualification for the Champions League third qualifying round
3	AZ	34	19	5	10	63	56	+7	62	Qualification for the Europa League third qualifying round
4	Feyenoord	34	17	8	9	56	39	+17	59	Qualification for the European competition play-offs
5	Vitesse (O)	34	16	10	8	66	43	+23	58	Qualification for the European competition play-offs
6	PEC Zwolle	34	16	5	13	59	43	+16	53	Qualification for the European competition play-offs
7	Heerenveen	34	13	11	10	53	46	+7	50	Qualification for the European competition play-offs
8	Groningen	34	11	13	10	49	53	−4	46	Qualification for the Europa League group stage (Note: Groningen qualified for the Europa League group stage by winning the 2014–15 KNVB Cup.)
9	Willem II	34	13	7	14	46	50	−4	46	
10	Twente (Note: FC Twente were deducted three points twice since they did not meet the financial standards set by the KNVB.)	34	13	10	11	56	51	+5	43	
11	Utrecht	34	11	8	15	60	62	−2	41	
12	Cambuur	34	11	8	15	46	56	−10	41	
13	ADO Den Haag	34	9	10	15	44	53	−9	37	
14	Heracles	34	11	4	19	47	64	−17	37	
15	Excelsior	34	6	14	14	47	63	−16	32	
16	NAC Breda (R)	34	6	10	18	36	68	−32	28	Qualification for the Relegation play-offs (Note: Ten teams, two from the Eredivisie and eight from the Eerste Divisie, played for two spots in the 2015–16 Eredivisie, the remaining eight teams play in the 2015–16 Eerste Divisie.)
17	Go Ahead Eagles (R)	34	7	6	21	29	59	−30	27	Qualification for the Europa League first qualifying round and for the relegation play-offs (Note: Go Ahead Eagles was awarded a spot in the 2015–16 UEFA Europa League first qualifying round because of its Fair Play ranking. They were also relegated to the 2015–16 Eerste Divisie after losing in the second round of the relegation play-offs.)
18	Dordrecht (R)	34	4	8	22	24	76	−52	20	Relegation to Eerste Divisie

Source: NUsport
Rules for classification: 1) points; 2) goal difference; 3) number of goals scored
(C) Champions; (O) Play-off winners; (R) Relegated

== Results ==
Home \ Away	ADO	AJX	AZ	CAM	DOR	EXC	FEY	GAE	GRO	HEE	HER	NAC	PEC	PSV	TWE	UTR	VIT	WII
ADO Den Haag		1–1	2–3	2–2	2–0	2–2	0–1	1–1	3–0	0–1	1–3	3–2	3–2	2–3	2–0	2–0	1–0	3–2
Ajax	1–0		0–1	3–0	4–0	1–0	0–0	3–1	2–0	4–1	2–1	0–0	0–0	1–3	4–2	3–1	4–1	5–0
AZ	3–1	1–3		2–1	2–0	3–3	1–4	2–0	2–2	0–1	3–1	3–2	1–0	2–4	2–2	0–3	1–0	2–0
Cambuur	3–2	2–4	0–2		4–1	1–1	0–1	1–0	3–0	2–1	1–0	0–1	2–1	1–2	1–1	3–1	0–2	1–2
Dordrecht	0–0	2–1	1–3	0–0		1–0	1–2	2–1	1–1	0–0	2–3	0–1	1–2	1–3	0–4	1–3	2–6	0–4
Excelsior	2–3	0–2	1–4	1–1	1–1		2–5	3–2	1–1	3–0	3–1	0–0	0–5	2–3	2–1	2–2	1–3	2–3
Feyenoord	2–1	0–1	2–2	2–1	2–0	3–2		0–1	4–0	1–1	2–1	3–0	2–0	2–1	3–1	1–2	1–4	1–2
Go Ahead Eagles	1–0	1–2	0–2	1–2	0–0	0–0	0–4		2–3	1–1	1–3	2–0	3–2	0–3	1–3	0–2	0–2	1–0
Groningen	1–1	2–0	2–4	3–2	2–0	1–1	1–1	2–0		1–1	3–1	1–0	0–1	1–1	2–2	2–2	1–1	1–0
Heerenveen	0–0	1–4	5–2	2–2	1–2	2–0	3–1	2–2	3–1		0–1	0–0	4–0	1–0	1–3	3–1	4–1	1–1
Heracles	3–1	0–2	0–3	0–1	1–1	0–3	2–0	1–0	2–2	1–4		6–1	2–0	1–2	1–4	1–1	1–1	1–3
NAC Breda	1–1	2–5	0–1	2–1	2–2	1–1	0–1	1–0	4–5	0–2	1–3		3–1	0–2	1–1	1–5	0–1	0–0
PEC Zwolle	3–1	1–1	1–1	6–1	4–0	1–1	3–0	0–1	2–0	2–2	4–2	4–1		3–1	1–2	2–0	2–1	1–0
PSV	1–0	1–3	3–0	4–0	3–0	3–0	4–3	5–0	2–1	4–1	2–0	6–1	3–1		2–0	3–1	2–0	2–1
Twente	2–2	1–1	0–2	2–1	3–0	1–3	0–0	2–1	1–2	2–0	2–0	1–1	2–0	0–5		3–1	1–2	3–2
Utrecht	0–0	1–1	6–2	1–3	6–1	2–2	0–0	2–3	1–0	1–2	2–4	3–4	0–2	1–5	1–0		3–1	2–1
Vitesse Arnhem	6–1	1–0	3–1	2–2	3–0	3–1	0–0	2–2	1–1	1–1	3–0	2–2	2–1	0–1	2–2	3–3		2–0
Willem II	1–0	1–1	3–0	1–1	2–1	1–1	2–2	1–0	1–4	2–1	3–0	2–1	0–1	1–3	2–2	1–0	1–4	

Source: NUsport
Legend: Blue = home team win; Yellow = draw; Red = away team win.

== Season statistics ==
=== Top scorers ===
Rank	Player	Club	Goals
1	(Netherlands) Memphis Depay	PSV	22
2	(Netherlands) Luuk de Jong	PSV	20
3	(Netherlands) Michael de Leeuw	Groningen	17
3	(Netherlands) Michiel Kramer	ADO Den Haag	17
5	(Suriname) Tjaronn Chery	Groningen	15
5	(Germany) Mark Uth	SC Heerenveen	15
7	(Morocco) Adnane Tighadouini	NAC Breda	14
7	(Netherlands) Georginio Wijnaldum	PSV	14
9	(Nigeria) Bartholomew Ogbeche	Cambuur	13
9	(Burkina Faso) Bertrand Traoré	Vitesse	13
9	(Netherlands) Tom van Weert	Excelsior	13
9	(Netherlands) Hakim Ziyech	Heerenveen / Twente	13

=== Assists ===
Rank	Player	Club	Assists
1	(Netherlands) Hakim Ziyech	Heerenveen / Twente	16
2	(Netherlands) Jetro Willems	PSV	12
3	(Netherlands) Luciano Narsingh	PSV	10
3	(Germany) Mark Uth	Heerenveen	10
4	(Netherlands) Luuk de Jong	PSV	9
4	(Netherlands) Davy Klaassen	Ajax	9
6	(Suriname) Roland Alberg	ADO Den Haag	8
6	(Netherlands) Anwar El Ghazi	Ajax	8
6	(Netherlands) Bryan Linssen	Heracles Almelo	8
6	(Netherlands) Furdjel Narsingh	Cambuur	8
6	(Denmark) Lasse Schöne	Ajax	8
6	(Netherlands) Marko Vejinović	Vitesse Arnhem	8

== Play-offs ==
=== European competition ===
Four teams played for a spot in the 2015–16 UEFA Europa League third qualifying round.

Semi-finals
Heerenveen (e)	1	2	3
Feyenoord	0	2	2
PEC Zwolle	1	1	2
Vitesse Arnhem	2	1	3

Final
Heerenveen	2	2	4
Vitesse Arnhem*	2	5	7

Key: * = Play-off winners, (a) = Wins because of away goals rule, (e) = Wins after extra time in second leg, (p) = Wins after penalty shoot-out.

=== Promotion/relegation play-offs ===
Ten teams, two from the Eredivisie and eight from the Eerste Divisie, played for two spots in the 2015–16 Eredivisie, the remaining eight teams play in the 2015–16 Eerste Divisie.

First round
Almere City	1	1	2
De Graafschap (e)	1	2	3
Oss	1	0	1
VVV-Venlo	2	0	2

Second round
De Graafschap	1	1	2
Go Ahead Eagles	0	0	0
Volendam	2	1	3
Eindhoven	1	1	2
VVV-Venlo	0	0	0
NAC Breda	1	3	4
Emmen	0	2	2
Roda JC Kerkrade	1	2	3

Third round
De Graafschap*	0	1	1
Volendam	0	0	0
NAC Breda	1	1	2
Roda JC Kerkrade* (a, e)	0	2	2

Key: * = Play-off winners, (a) = Wins because of away goals rule, (e) = Wins after extra time in second leg, (p) = Wins after penalty shoot-out.

== Awards ==
=== Annual awards ===
Annual awards
Award	Winner	Club
Dutch Footballer of the Year	(Netherlands) Georginio Wijnaldum	PSV Eindhoven
Johan Cruyff Trophy	(Netherlands) Memphis Depay	PSV Eindhoven
Eredivisie top scorer	(Netherlands) Memphis Depay	PSV Eindhoven
Rinus Michels Award	(Netherlands) Phillip Cocu	PSV Eindhoven

Team of the Season
Goalkeeper	(Netherlands) Warner Hahn (PEC Zwolle)			
Defenders	(Netherlands) Kevin Diks (Vitesse)	(Brazil) Eric Botteghin (FC Groningen)	(Netherlands) Sven van Beek (Feyenoord)	(Netherlands) Jetro Willems (PSV Eindhoven)
Midfielders	(Mexico) Andrés Guardado (PSV Eindhoven)	(Netherlands) Georginio Wijnaldum (PSV Eindhoven)	(Suriname) Tjaronn Chery (FC Groningen)	(Netherlands) Steven Berghuis (AZ Alkmaar)
Forwards	(Netherlands) Michiel Kramer (ADO Den Haag)	(Netherlands) Memphis Depay (PSV Eindhoven)		

== Attendances ==
No.	Club	Average	Change	Highest
1	AFC Ajax	50,058	-1,7%	52,472
2	Feyenoord	45,331	-0,9%	47,500
3	PSV	32,529	-1,5%	35,000
4	FC Twente	28,494	-3,6%	30,000
5	sc Heerenveen	24,196	6,2%	27,224
6	FC Groningen	20,193	2,1%	21,821
7	NAC Breda	18,035	0,7%	19,000
8	SBV Vitesse	17,149	-9,7%	23,381
9	FC Utrecht	16,708	-1,4%	20,046
10	AZ	15,512	-0,4%	17,081
11	PEC Zwolle	12,213	1,4%	12,500
12	Willem II	12,195	32,4%	14,500
13	ADO Den Haag	11,986	10,4%	14,937
14	SC Cambuur	9,710	-0,2%	10,000
15	Heracles Almelo	8,290	-0,6%	8,500
16	Go Ahead Eagles	7,880	3,3%	8,011
17	FC Dordrecht	3,872	33,0%	4,235
18	SBV Excelsior	3,516	47,0%	3,600
