= Lock Haven Bald Eagles =

- University: Lock Haven University
- Conference: Pennsylvania State; Mid-American (wrestling only); Atlantic 10 (field hockey only)
- NCAA: Division II, Division I
- Athletic director: Albert Jones
- Location: Lock Haven, Pennsylvania
- Varsity teams: 21
- Football stadium: Hubert Jack Stadium
- Basketball arena: Thomas Fieldhouse
- Baseball stadium: Watkins Field
- Softball stadium: Lawrence Field
- Lacrosse stadium: Charlotte E. Smith Field
- Wrestling arena: Thomas Fieldhouse
- Nickname: Bald Eagles
- Colors: Crimson and white
- Website: www.golhu.com
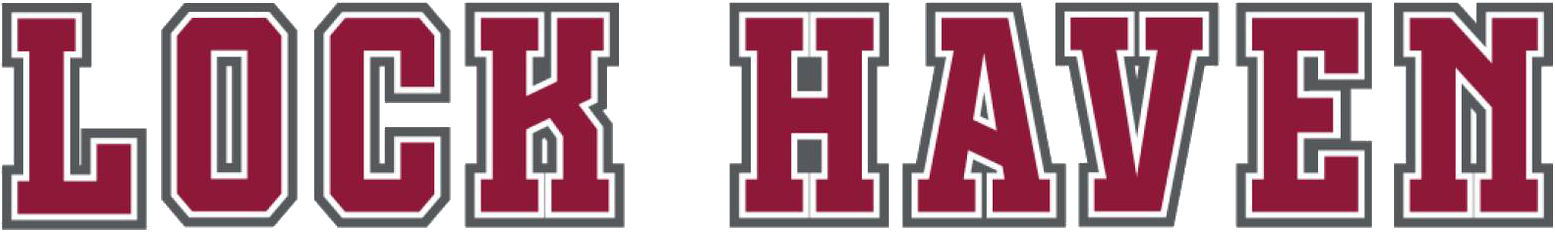

The Lock Haven Bald Eagles are the intercollegiate sports teams of Lock Haven University of Pennsylvania, located in Lock Haven, Pennsylvania. LHU participates in NCAA Division II as a member of the Pennsylvania State Athletic Conference (PSAC) for most sports. Field hockey and wrestling participate in NCAA Division I as members of the Atlantic 10 Conference and Mid-American Conference (MAC) respectively.

On Saturday, September 29, 2012, Lock Haven lost to the Shippensburg Raiders by a score of 49-6. With the loss Lock Haven took sole possession of the all-time NCAA Division II Football consecutive losing streak record at 47 games, with their last win occurring on November 3, 2007. The previous record of 46 was held by the Minnesota-Morris Cougars (who have since reclassified to Division III); that streak ran from November 14, 1998 - September 20, 2003. On November 10, 2012, the Lock Haven Bald Eagles defeated the Cheyney Wolves by a score of 15–7, ending their record losing streak at 52 games.

== Sports ==
Men's sports	Women's sports
Baseball	Basketball
Basketball	Cross country
Cross country	Field hockey
Football	Golf
Soccer	Lacrosse
Track and field (Note: indoor and outdoor.)	Soccer
Wrestling	Softball
	Swimming
	Tennis
	Track and field
	Wrestling

== Championships ==
=== Team National Championships ===
Sport	Title years
Field Hockey	1981, 1982, 1989, 1992, 1994, 1995, 2000
Lacrosse	1979
Softball	2006, 2009
Soccer (M)	1977 (Division III), 1978 (Division III), 1980
Wrestling (M)	1961 (NAIA), 1963 (NAIA), 1966 (NAIA), 1967 (NAIA)

=== Individual National Championships ===
Sport	Athlete	Title years
Wrestling (M)	Gus DeAugustino	1953
Wrestling (M)	Gray Simons	1960, 1961, 1962
Wrestling (M)	Fred Powell	1964
Wrestling (M)	Bill Blacksmith	1966
Wrestling (M)	Ken Melchior	1968
Wrestling (M)	Cary Kolat	1996, 1997
