= Wrestling at the 1959 Mediterranean Games =

Wrestling competition

- Dates: October 1959

The wrestling tournament at the 1959 Mediterranean Games was held in Beirut, Lebanon.

== Medal table ==
* Host nation (Lebanon)

Rank	Nation	Gold	Silver	Bronze	Total
1	Turkey	12	2	1	15
2	United Arab Republic	2	6	5	13
3	Lebanon	1	2	4	7
4	Yugoslavia	1	1	0	2
5	France	0	5	3	8
6	Greece	0	0	2	2
7	Spain	0	0	1	1
Totals (7 entries)		16	16	16	48

== Medalists ==
=== Men's freestyle ===
Event	Gold	Silver	Bronze
52 kg	Mehmet Kartal; Turkey	André Zoéte; France	Hussein Khamis Abbas; United Arab Republic
57 kg	Bayram Uysal; Turkey	Hani Ibrahim Mounteche; Lebanon	Ibrahim Ahmed Abdelatif; United Arab Republic
62 kg	Mehmet Kocur; Turkey	Georges Ballery; France	Mohamed Ahmed El Dib; United Arab Republic
67 kg	Hilmi Gezici; Turkey	Roger Bielle; France	Ioannis Manganas; Greece
73 kg	Mahmut Atalay; Turkey	Hassan El Sayed; United Arab Republic	René Schiermeyer; France
79 kg	Ziya Doğan; Turkey	Mohamed Raafat Wahdan; United Arab Republic	André Saade; Lebanon
87 kg	Bekir Büke; Turkey	Mohamed Gamal El Eidaross; United Arab Republic	Maurice Jacquel; France
+7 kg	Hamit Kaplan; Turkey	Mohamed Mahmoud El Sharkawi; United Arab Republic	Abbas Moussoulman; Lebanon

=== Men's Greco-Roman ===
Event	Gold	Silver	Bronze
52 kg	Dursun Ali Eğribaş; Turkey	Borivoj Vukov; Yugoslavia	Mohamed Eid; United Arab Republic
57 kg	Kamel El-Sayed; United Arab Republic	Michel Nakouzi; Lebanon	Mikhail Theodoropoulos; Greece
62 kg	Elie Naasan; Lebanon	Moustafa Hamid Mansour; United Arab Republic	Niyazi Tanelli; Turkey
67 kg	Rıza Doğan; Turkey	Roger Bielle; France	Kamal Bilaba'; United Arab Republic
73 kg	Stevan Horvat; Yugoslavia	Mithat Bayrak; Turkey	René Schiermeyer; France
79 kg	Ziya Doğan; Turkey	Mohamed Raafat Wahdan; United Arab Republic	Yacoub Romanos; Lebanon
87 kg	Tevfik Kış; Turkey	Maurice Jacquel; France	Jean Saade; Lebanon
+87 kg	Ibrahim El Husseyni; United Arab Republic	Süleyman Baştimur; Turkey	Diego Ariel; Spain
