= Alflen (surname) =

Alflen is a surname. Notable people with the surname include:

- Loek Alflen (1933–2015), Dutch sport wrestler
- Rob Alflen (born 1968), Dutch footballer and manager
- Ted Alflen (born 1946), American football player

== See also ==
- Allen (surname)
