= Debrunner =

Debrunner is a surname. Notable people with the surname include:

- Catherine Debrunner (born 1995), Swiss athlete
- Hans Werner Debrunner (1923–1998), Swiss German historian and theologian
- Irène Debrunner (born 1952), Swiss swimmer
- Richard Debrunner (born 1937), Swiss wrestler

== See also ==
- Debrunner Koenig Holding, a Swiss wholesale distributor
