= Knitter =

Knitter may refer to

- Bernard Knitter (born 1938), Polish Olympic wrestler
- Paul F. Knitter, American theologian
- The Knitters, American country and folk band
- Someone who knits

== See also ==
- Yevgeni Kniter (born 1982), Israeli ice hockey player
