= Ali Hashemi =

Ali Hashemi may refer to:

- Ali Hashemi (commander) (1961–1988), Iranian military commander
- Ali Hashemi (commander) (?- 8 March 2026), Iranian military commander killed during the 2026 Iran war
- Ali Hashemi (weightlifter) (born 1991), Iranian Olympic weightlifter
- Ali Banihashemi (born 1934), Iranian Olympic wrestler
