= Gray Simons =

American wrestler (born 1939)

Personal information
- Full name: Elliott Gray Simons
- Born: August 13, 1939 (age 86) Norfolk, Virginia, U.S.

Sport
- Country: United States
- Sport: Wrestling
- Events: Freestyle and Folkstyle
- College team: Lock Haven
- Club: U.S. Army
- Team: USA
Medal record
Collegiate Wrestling
Representing the Lock Haven Bald Eagles
NCAA Championships
Gold medal – first place	1960 College Park	115 lb
Gold medal – first place	1961 Corvallis	115 lb
Gold medal – first place	1962 Stillwater	115 lb
NAIA Championships
Gold medal – first place	1959 DeKalb	115 lb
Gold medal – first place	1960 Lock Haven	115 lb
Gold medal – first place	1961 Golden	115 lb
Gold medal – first place	1962 Winona	115 lb

Elliott Gray Simons (born August 13, 1939) is a former American wrestler. He competed in the 1960 Summer Olympics and the 1964 Summer Olympics in freestyle wrestling. Simons later served as head coach at Lock Haven, Indiana State, Tennessee, and Old Dominion.

As a collegiate wrestler, Simons was a four-time NAIA national champion and three-time NCAA national champion. Simons was named Most Outstanding Wrestler of the NCAA tournament twice and the NAIA touranament four times, earning this honor in six of seven national meets he competed in. His feat of winning seven collegiate wrestling national championships remains unmatched.

In 1978, he was inducted into the National Wrestling Hall of Fame as a Distinguished Member.
