= Vladlen Trostyansky =

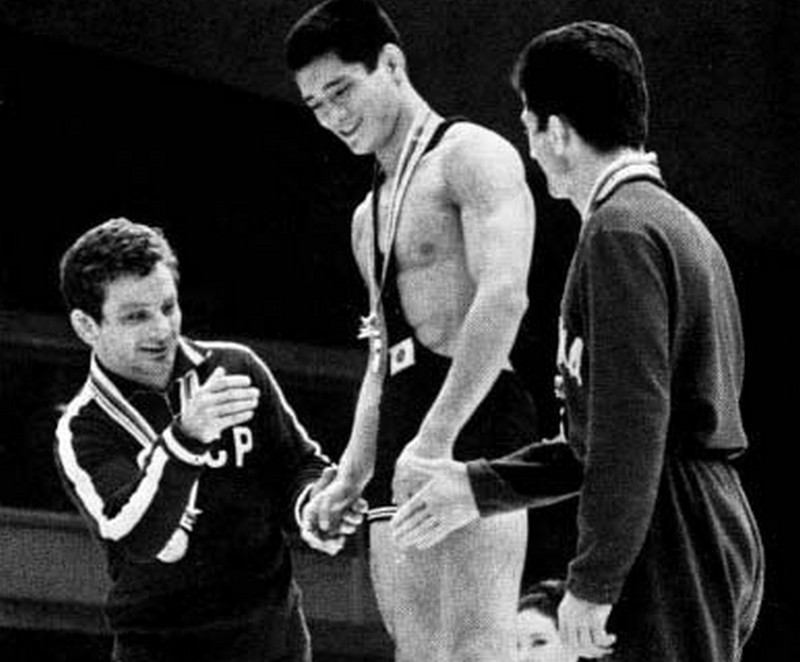
- Trostyansky (left) at the 1964 Olympics

Personal information
- Born: 26 January 1935 Kyiv, Ukrainian SSR, Soviet Union
- Died: 28 July 2014 (aged 79) Kyiv, Ukraine
- Height: 156 cm (5 ft 1 in)

Sport
- Sport: Greco-Roman wrestling
- Club: Soviet Army Kiev
Medal record
Representing the Soviet Union
Olympic Games
Silver medal – second place	1964 Tokyo	57 kg

Vladlen Kostyantinovich Trostyansky (Ukrainian: Владлен Костянтинович Тростянський, 26 January 1935 – 28 July 2014) was a bantamweight Greco-Roman wrestler from Ukraine. He competed at the 1964 Olympics and 1966 World Championships and won a silver medal in 1964.

Trostyansky took up wrestling in 1951 and soon became one of the best Soviet wrestlers in his division. Internationally he was a substitute to Oleg Karavayev, and started competing only after Karavayev's retirement in 1964. Domestically he won two Soviet titles, in 1961 and 1966, both times in Karavayev's absence, placing second in 1962–65 and 1968. After retiring from competitions Trostyansky worked as a wrestling coach in Ukraine and headed the Wrestling Federation of Kyiv Oblast.
