= Tveiten =

Tveiten is a surname. Notable people with the surname include:

- Ivar Petterson Tveiten (1850–1934), Norwegian teacher and politician
- John Tveiten (1933–1994), Norwegian wrestler
- Margit Tveiten (born 1961), Norwegian diplomat
- Merethe Tveiten (born 1995), Norwegian para table tennis player
- Ragnar Tveiten (born 1938), Norwegian biathlete
- Rita Tveiten (born 1954), Norwegian politician

== See also ==
- Horten
