= Gramellini =

Gramellini is an Italian surname. Notable people with the surname include:

- Gilberto Gramellini (1930–2013), Italian wrestler
- Massimo Gramellini (born 1960), Italian writer and journalist
