= Franz Brunner =

Franz Brunner may refer to:

- Franz Brunner (handballer) (1913–1991), Austrian handballer
- Franz Brunner (wrestler) (1931–2014), Austrian wrestler
