= Ünver Beşergil =

Turkish wrestler

Personal information
- Nationality: Turkish
- Born: 25 March 1938 (age 88)

Sport
- Sport: Wrestling

Ünver Beşergil (born 25 March 1938) is a Turkish wrestler. He competed in the men's Greco-Roman bantamweight at the 1964 Summer Olympics.
