= Siavash Shafizadeh =

Iranian wrestler

Personal information
- Nationality: Iranian
- Born: 30 March 1944 (age 82)

Sport
- Sport: Wrestling

Siavash Shafizadeh (Persian: سیاوش شفیع‌زاده; born 30 March 1944) is an Iranian wrestler. He competed in the men's Greco-Roman bantamweight at the 1964 Summer Olympics.
