= 1958 World Wrestling Championships =

- Host city: Budapest, Hungary
- Dates: 24–27 July 1958

Champions
- Greco-Roman: Soviet Union

The 1958 World Greco-Roman Wrestling Championship was held in Budapest, Hungary from 24 to 27 July 1958.

== Medal table ==
Rank	Nation	Gold	Silver	Bronze	Total
1	Soviet Union	5	2	1	8
2	Turkey	2	2	1	5
3	Hungary	1	2	1	4
4	Bulgaria	0	1	0	1
4	West Germany	0	1	0	1
6	East Germany	0	0	2	2
7	Romania	0	0	1	1
7	Sweden	0	0	1	1
7	Yugoslavia	0	0	1	1
Totals (9 entries)		8	8	8	24

== Team ranking ==
Rank	Men's Greco-Roman	
Rank	Team	Points
1	Soviet Union	44
2	Turkey	26
3	Hungary	23

== Medal summary ==
Event	Gold	Silver	Bronze
Flyweight; 52 kg	Boris Gurevich; Soviet Union	Sándor Kerekes; Hungary	Borivoj Vukov; Yugoslavia
Bantamweight; 57 kg	Oleg Karavaev; Soviet Union	Yaşar Yılmaz; Turkey	Lothar Fischer; East Germany
Featherweight; 62 kg	Imre Polyák; Hungary	Müzahir Sille; Turkey	Vladimir Stashkevich; Soviet Union
Lightweight; 67 kg	Rıza Doğan; Turkey	Viktor Vasin; Soviet Union	Gyula Tóth; Hungary
Welterweight; 73 kg	Kazım Ayvaz; Turkey	Grigory Gamarnik; Soviet Union	Valeriu Bularca; Romania
Middleweight; 79 kg	Givi Kartozia; Soviet Union	Horst Heß; West Germany	Lothar Metz; East Germany
Light heavyweight 87 kg	Rostom Abashidze; Soviet Union	György Gurics; Hungary	Rune Jansson; Sweden
Heavyweight +87 kg	Ivan Bohdan; Soviet Union	Lyutvi Ahmedov; Bulgaria	Hamit Kaplan; Turkey
