= Dick Wilson (wrestler) =

American wrestler

Personal information
- Born: November 19, 1933 Washington, Pennsylvania, U.S.
- Died: December 31, 2008 (aged 75) Franklin, Tennessee, U.S.

Sport
- Country: United States
- Sport: Wrestling
- Events: Greco-Roman, Freestyle, and Folkstyle
- College team: Toledo
- Club: U.S. Army
- Team: USA
Medal record
Men's freestyle wrestling
Representing the United States
Pan American Games
Gold medal – first place	1959 Chicago	52 kg
Collegiate Wrestling
Representing the Toledo Rockets
NCAA Championships
Silver medal – second place	1959 Iowa City	115 lb
Silver medal – second place	1960 College Park	115 lb
Silver medal – second place	1961 Corvallis	115 lb

Dick Wilson (November 19, 1933 – December 31, 2008) was an American wrestler. He competed at the 1956 Summer Olympics, the 1960 Summer Olympics and the 1964 Summer Olympics in Greco-Roman wrestling. He competed collegiately at the University of Toledo, where he was a three-time NCAA runner-up and three-time All-American. He was a Pan American Games champion in freestyle wrestling in 1959. At the 1961 World Wrestling Championships, he competed in both freestyle and Greco-Roman, finishing fifth in both disciplines while serving as team captain. In total he was a six-time AAU National Champion in Greco-Roman and freestyle wrestling styles.

In 2016, Wilson was inducted into the National Wrestling Hall of Fame as a Distinguished Member.
