= Tsvyatko Pashkulev =

Bulgarian wrestler (1945–2019)

Personal information
- Nationality: Bulgarian
- Born: 4 February 1945
- Died: 1 November 2019 (aged 74)

Sport
- Sport: Wrestling

Tsvyatko Pashkulev (4 February 1945 – 1 November 2019) was a Bulgarian wrestler. He competed in the men's Greco-Roman bantamweight at the 1964 Summer Olympics.
