= Larry Lauchle =

American wrestler (born 1939)

Personal information
- Born: September 17, 1939 (age 87) Muncy, Pennsylvania, U.S.

Sport
- Country: United States
- Sport: Wrestling
- Events: Greco-Roman and Folkstyle
- College team: Pittsburgh
- Team: USA
Medal record
Collegiate Wrestling
Representing the Pittsburgh Panthers
NCAA Championships
Gold medal – first place	1961 Corvallis	130 lb
Silver medal – second place	1959 Iowa City	123 lb
Silver medal – second place	1960 College Park	130 lb

Larry Lauchle (born September 17, 1939) is an American wrestler. He competed in the men's Greco-Roman bantamweight at the 1960 Summer Olympics. He wrestled collegiately for the Pittsburgh Panthers, where he was an NCAA champion and three-time finalist.
