= Michel Ben Akoun =

Moroccan wrestler

Personal information
- Nationality: Moroccan
- Born: 15 February 1936 (age 90) Casablanca, Morocco

Sport
- Sport: Wrestling

Michel Ben Akoun (born 15 February 1936) is a Moroccan wrestler. He competed in the men's Greco-Roman bantamweight at the 1960 Summer Olympics.
