= Aimé Verhoeven =

Belgian wrestler (1935–2021)

Personal information
- Nationality: Belgian
- Born: 18 December 1935 Antwerp, Belgium
- Died: 19 May 2021 (aged 85)

Sport
- Sport: Wrestling

Aimé Verhoeven (18 December 1935 – 19 May 2021) was a Belgian wrestler. He competed in the men's Greco-Roman bantamweight at the 1960 Summer Olympics.
