= Ion Cernea =

Romanian wrestler (1933–2025)

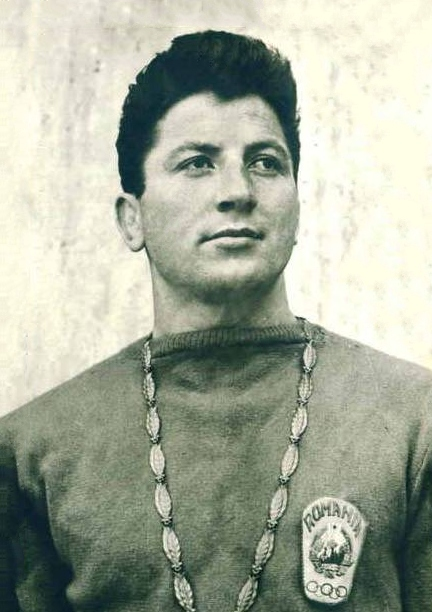
- Cernea at the 1960 Olympics

Personal information
- Born: 21 October 1933 Râu Alb, Argeș County, Romania
- Died: 30 June 2025 (aged 91) Bucharest, Romania
- Resting place: Bellu Cemetery
- Height: 161 cm (5 ft 3 1/2 in)

Sport
- Sport: Greco-Roman wrestling
- Club: Dinamo Bucuresti
Medal record
Representing Romania
Olympic Games
Silver medal – second place	1960 Rome	57 kg
Bronze medal – third place	1964 Tokyo	57 kg
World Championships
Gold medal – first place	1965 Manchester	57 kg
Silver medal – second place	1961 Yokohama	57 kg

Ion Cernea (21 October 1933 – 30 June 2025) was a Romanian bantamweight Greco-Roman wrestler. Between 1960 and 1965 he earned two Olympic (a Silver in 1960 in Rome and a Bronze in 1964 in Tokyo) and two world championship medals, winning the world title in 1965. He retired the same year to become a wrestling coach and international referee, and was present in this capacity at all major international wrestling competitions between 1972 and 1988.

Cernea was married to the singer Irina Loghin; they had a son and a daughter. He died on 30 June 2025, at the age of 91.
