= R. Wayne Baughman =

American wrestler (1941–2022)

Biographical details
- Born: January 4, 1941; Oklahoma City, Oklahoma, U.S.
- Died: February 16, 2022 (aged 81); Colorado Springs, Colorado, U.S.

Playing career
- 1961–1963: Oklahoma

Coaching career (HC unless noted)
- 1976–1984: Air Force
- 1989–2006: Air Force

Head coaching record
- Overall: 183–134–4 (.576)

Accomplishments and honors

Championships
- 1 WAC (1991)

Sports career
Medal record
Collegiate Wrestling
Representing the Oklahoma Sooners
NCAA Championships
Gold medal – first place	1962 Stillwater	191 lb
Silver medal – second place	1961 Corvallis	177 lb
Silver medal – second place	1963 Kent	191 lb

Wayne Baughman (January 4, 1941 – February 16, 2022) was an American wrestler, coach and ultra-endurance athlete. He competed in the 1964 Summer Olympics, the 1968 Summer Olympics, and the 1972 Summer Olympics.

== Biography ==
He was born and raised in Oklahoma City, Oklahoma. He attended John Marshall Jr-Sr High School (1953–59) and the University of Oklahoma (1959–1963). He earned letters in football and wrestling in high school. Baughman served as the United States Air Force Academy’s Head Wrestling Coach from 1976 to 1984 and 1989 to 2006. From 1963 through 1972, he made three Olympic teams, eight World teams (including a freestyle/Greco-Roman double in 1965), and won 16 national titles (he never placed lower than third at a national event). He is also the only person who has won national championships in the four recognized wrestling styles (collegiate, freestyle, Greco-Roman, and Sambo), and one of only two wrestlers to have placed in the Olympics and/or World Championships in the three international styles (FS, GR, & Sombo).

Baughman elected to go with coaches Port Robertson and Tommy Evans at OU. The four years he was at OU, the team won the NCAA Team Championship twice and took second behind OSU the other two years. As an individual, Baughman won the NCAA Championship once and finished second twice. He also won the Big 8 Championship twice, was second once and received both the Most Falls Trophy and Outstanding Wrestler Award his senior season (1963).

Baughman was on three Olympic teams (1964, 1968, and 1972) and eight World Championship teams. He was head coach of the 1976 U.S. Olympic Freestyle Wrestling Team. He also coached five world Championship teams including both FS and GR. His record in 25 National Championships is 16 first-place finishes, 7 seconds, and 2 third-place finishes.

Baughman's first Air Force assignment was to Tinker AFB, Oklahoma. He then spent five years as an instructor and coach at the United States Air Force Academy Preparatory School, five years as Chief of Air Force Programs (Athletic Director of the entire Air Force) at HQ USAF, then nine years as an instructor and head wrestling coach at the United States Air Force Academy. After retiring from USAF active duty, he served as Director of Operations and Assistant General Manager for the 1986 World Cycling Championships, wrote the book Wrestling On and Off the Mat (ISBN 978-0961844608) and did speaking engagements and Clinics. Baughman returned to the head wrestling coach position as a civilian. He served as an Athletes Representative on many wrestling committees.

Kyle Klingman, associate director at the International Wrestling Institute and Museum, documented the impact of Baughman's career by stating:

Despite all of his accomplishments in wrestling, it's the praise of his peers that speaks loudest for Baughman. John Peterson, a gold medalist at the 1976 Olympics, calls Baughman a man of great integrity. Peterson speaks with reverence about the time Baughman stood up to the AAU when the 'committee' questioned how well John and his brother Ben would do at the Olympics in 1972. (Ben and John eventually won a gold and silver medal respectively). Five-time world medalist Larry Kristoff calls him one of the classiest guys he's ever met and wrestling icon Dan Gable calls Baughman 'one tough dude'.

Baughman is one of 33 native Oklahomans who have been inducted as Distinguished Members of the National Wrestling Hall of Fame and Museum.

Mike Chapman, Executive Director of the Dan Gable International Wrestling Institute and Museum, wrote a book called Wrestling Tough (ISBN 978-0736056373). He described Baughman saying he:

Was known as a wrestler who would go all out in every match. He was always in superb condition, and his mental approach to the sport was second to none. A gentleman and Air Force officer off the mat, he ran marathons without extra training just to test himself and his mental toughness. He was a fierce combatant on the mat. He asked for no quarter in any match, and he offered none. 'I always wrestle to hurt my opponent but never to injure him,' he explained. 'There is a definite difference in hurt and injure. If my opponent is distracted by pain, he is not thinking clearly about what else I am doing to him or what he is going to do to me. I will not jeopardize a joint if a person can’t turn to relieve the pressure but if they can turn to neutralize the pressure or pain then it becomes their choice.'

— (Chapman, 139)

After completing his competitive wrestling career, Baughman became involved in ultra-endurance events. He has completed the Pikes Peak Marathon five times, the Ironman Triathlon in Hawaii, the Leadville 100 Mile Trail run twice, The "Bad Water 146" mile run, the Grand Canyon Rim to Rim and Back Again, the Hardscrabble Pass 100 mile Bicycle. Baughman is included in another Mike Chapman book, The Toughest Men in Sports (ISBN 978-0967608013), and was the model for the man at the base of the Air Force Monument in downtown Oklahoma City.

Baughman died in Colorado Springs, Colorado, on February 16, 2022, at the age of 81.
