= François Schlechter =

Luxembourgish wrestler (1933–2015)

Personal information
- Nationality: Luxembourgish
- Born: 9 May 1933 Luxembourg, Luxembourg
- Died: 20 March 2015 (aged 81)

Sport
- Sport: Wrestling

François Schlechter (9 May 1933 – 20 March 2015) was a Luxembourgish wrestler. He competed in the men's Greco-Roman bantamweight at the 1960 Summer Olympics. Schlechter died on 20 March 2015, at the age of 81.
