= 1960 NCAA wrestling championships =

American collegiate wrestling tournament

1960 NCAA Wrestling Championships
Tournament information
- Sport: College wrestling
- Location: College Park, Maryland
- Dates: 3/24/1960–3/26/1960
- Host: University of Maryland

Final positions
- Champions: Oklahoma
- 2nd place: Iowa State
- 3rd place: Wyoming
- MVP: David Auble (Cornell University)

The 1960 NCAA Wrestling Championships were the 30th NCAA wrestling championships to be held. The University of Maryland hosted the tournament in College Park, Maryland.

Oklahoma took home the team championship with 59 points and having three individual champions.

David Auble of Cornell University was named the Most Outstanding Wrestler.

== Team results ==
Rank	School	Points
1	Oklahoma	59
2	Iowa State	40
3	Wyoming	36
4	Iowa	32
5	Oklahoma State	29
6	Lock Haven	25
7	Penn State	23
8	Pittsburgh	21
9	Northwestern	20
T-10	Northern Illinois	17
T-10	Cornell	17

== Individual finals ==
Weight class	Championship match (champion in boldface)
115 lbs	**Gray Simons**, Lock Haven RD Dick Wilson, Toledo, 3-3, 2-2
123 lbs	**David Auble**, Cornell University DEC Masaaki Hatta, Oklahoma State, 9-5
130 lbs	**Stan Abel**, Oklahoma DEC Larry Lauchle, Pittsburgh, 5-2
137 lbs	**Les Anderson**, Iowa State DEC Lester Austin, Syracuse, 6-3
147 lbs	**Larry Hayes**, Iowa State DEC Jerry Frude, Wyoming, 4-1
157 lbs	**Art Kraft**, Northwestern DEC Thad Turner, Lehigh, 5-3
167 lbs	**Dick Ballinger**, Wyoming DEC Ronnie Clinton, Oklahoma State 6-4
177 lbs	**Roy Conrad**, Northern Illinois DEC David Campbell, Oklahoma, 14-13
191 lbs	**George Goodner**, Oklahoma DEC Jack Stanbro, Ithaca, 4-3
UNL	**Dale Lewis**, Oklahoma DEC Sherwyn Thorson, Iowa, 3-1

== See also ==
- NAIA Men's Wrestling Championship
