= Stipan Dora =

Serbian wrestler

Personal information
- Nationality: Yugoslavia, Serbia
- Born: 8 April 1935 Sombor, Kingdom of Yugoslavia
- Died: 2012 (aged 76–77) Subotica, Serbia

Sport
- Sport: Wrestling

Stipan Dora (Serbian Cyrillic: Стипан Дора; 8 April 1935 – 2012) was a wrestler of Bunjevac descent from Vojvodina, Serbia. He competed in the men's Greco-Roman bantamweight at the 1960 Summer Olympics.
