= Jang I-hyeon =

South Korean wrestler

Personal information
- Nationality: South Korean
- Born: 4 September 1943 (age 82)

Sport
- Sport: Wrestling

Jang I-hyeon (born 4 September 1943) is a South Korean wrestler. He competed in the men's Greco-Roman bantamweight at the 1964 Summer Olympics.
