= 1963 NCAA Wrestling Championships =

American collegiate wrestling tournament

1963 NCAA University Division Wrestling Championships
Tournament information
- Sport: College wrestling
- Location: Kent, Ohio
- Dates: 3/21/1963–3/23/1963
- Host(s): Kent State

Final positions
- Champions: Oklahoma
- 2nd place: Iowa State
- 3rd place: Michigan
- MVP: Mickey Martin (Oklahoma)

The 1963 NCAA Wrestling Championships were the 33rd NCAA wrestling championships to be held. Kent State hosted the tournament in Kent, Ohio.

Oklahoma took home the team championship with 48 points and having one individual champion.

Mickey Martin of Oklahoma University was named the Most Outstanding Wrestler.

== Team results ==
Rank	School	Points
1	Oklahoma	48
2	Iowa State	45
3	Michigan	36
T-4	Syracuse	32
T-4	Pittsburgh	32
T-4	Oklahoma State	32
7	Iowa	25
8	Lehigh	24
9	Colorado State	23
10	Minnesota	18

== Individual finals ==
Weight class	Championship match (champion in boldface)
115 lbs	**Arthur Maughan**, Minnesota State-Moorhead FALL Gil Sanchez, Colorado State, 8:11
123 lbs	**Mike Nissen**, Nebraska FALL Mike Johnson, Pittsburgh, 10:55 OT
130 lbs	**Mickey Martin**, Oklahoma DEC Bobby Douglas, West Liberty State, 12-8
137 lbs	**Bill Dotson**, Northern Iowa DEC Tom Huff, Iowa, 5-5, 3-2
147 lbs	**Mike Natvig**, Army DEC Lonnie Rubis, Minnesota, 7-2
157 lbs	**Kirk Pendleton**, Northern Colorado DEC Phil Kinyon, Oklahoma State, 5-2
167 lbs	**Jim Harrison**, Pittsburgh DEC Steve Combs, Iowa 3-2
177 lbs	**Dean Lahr**, Colorado DEC Harry Houska, Ohio University, 5-2
191 lbs	**Jack Barden**, Michigan DEC Wayne Baughman, Oklahoma, 4-2
UNL	**Jim Nance**, Syracuse DEC Larry Kristoff, Southern Illinois - Carbondale, 2-1
