= Santiago Cañete =

Spanish wrestler

Personal information
- Nationality: Spanish
- Born: 18 December 1935 (age 90) Hellín, Spain

Sport
- Sport: Wrestling

Santiago Cañete (born 18 December 1935) is a Spanish wrestler. He competed in the men's Greco-Roman bantamweight at the 1960 Summer Olympics.
