= 1959 NCAA Wrestling Championships =

American collegiate wrestling tournament

Tournament information
- Sport: College wrestling
- Location: Iowa City, Iowa
- Dates: March 26th, 1959–March 28th, 1959
- Host(s): University of Iowa

Final positions
- Champions: Oklahoma State (21st title)
- 2nd place: Iowa State
- 3rd place: Oklahoma
- MVP: Ron Gray (Iowa State)

The 1959 NCAA Wrestling Championships were the 29th NCAA wrestling championships to be held. The University of Iowa hosted the tournament in Iowa City, Iowa. Oklahoma State won the team championship with 73 points and had two individual champions.

Iowa State's Ron Gray was named the Most Outstanding Wrestler.

== Team results ==
Team results
Rank	School	Points
1	Oklahoma State	73
2	Iowa State	51
3	Oklahoma	41
4	Iowa	33
5	Pittsburgh	30
6	Wyoming	25
7	Minnesota State	21
8	Lehigh	20
T-9	Minnesota	17
T-9	Michigan State	17

== Individual finals ==
Individual finals
Weight class	Championship match (champion in boldface)
115 lbs	**Andy Fitch**, Yale RD Dick Wilson, Toledo, 3-3, 5-4
123 lbs	**David Auble**, Cornell University DEC Larry Lauchle, Pittsburgh, 10-4
130 lbs	**Stan Abel**, Oklahoma DEC Les Anderson, Iowa State, 3-2
137 lbs	**Larry Hayes**, Iowa State DEC Shelby Wilson, Oklahoma State, 10-3
147 lbs	**Ron Gray**, Iowa State DEC Jerry Frude, Wyoming, 9-3
157 lbs	**Dick Beattie**, Oklahoma State DEC Sid Terry, Oklahoma, 8-5
167 lbs	**Ed Hamer**, Lehigh DEC Tom Alberts, Pittsburgh 4-0
177 lbs	**Jim Craig**, Iowa DEC Al Blanshan, Minnesota State, 6-5
191 lbs	**Art Baker**, Syracuse DEC Tim Woodin, Michigan State, 9-5
UNL	**Ted Ellis**, Oklahoma State RD Bob Marella, Ithaca, 1-1, 2-0
