= Gilbert Dubier =

French wrestler (1931–2019)

Personal information
- Nationality: French
- Born: 14 September 1931 Nantes, France
- Died: 10 April 2019 (aged 87)

Sport
- Sport: Wrestling

Gilbert Dubier (14 September 1931 – 10 April 2019) was a French wrestler. He competed in the men's Greco-Roman bantamweight at the 1960 Summer Olympics.
