= Michele Toma =

Italian wrestler

Personal information
- Born: 9 August 1938 (age 88) Rome, Italy

Sport
- Sport: Wrestling

Michele Toma (born 9 August 1938) is an Italian wrestler. He competed in the men's Greco-Roman bantamweight at the 1964 Summer Olympics.

Toma is a former athlete of the Gruppo Sportivo Fiamme Oro.
