= Reino Tuominen =

Finnish wrestler

Personal information
- Nationality: Finnish
- Born: 30 March 1935 Kotka, Finland
- Died: 27 December 1974 (aged 39) Kotka, Finland

Sport
- Sport: Wrestling

Reino Tuominen (30 March 1935 – 27 December 1974) was a Finnish wrestler. He competed in the men's Greco-Roman bantamweight at the 1960 Summer Olympics.
