= Andy Fitch =

American wrestler (born 1936)

Personal information
- Born: August 28, 1936 (age 89) New York, New York, U.S.

Sport
- Country: United States
- Sport: Wrestling
- Events: Greco-Roman, Freestyle and Folkstyle
- College team: Yale
- Club: New York Athletic Club
- Team: USA
Medal record
Men's freestyle wrestling
Representing United States
Pan American Games
Gold medal – first place	1963 São Paulo	52 kg
Collegiate Wrestling
Representing the Yale Bulldogs
NCAA Championships
Gold medal – first place	1959 Iowa City	115 lb

Andy Fitch (born August 28, 1936) is an American former wrestler. Fitch won an NCAA championship for Yale University in 1959, a gold medal at the 1963 Pan American Games in freestyle wrestling, and competed in the men's Greco-Roman bantamweight at the 1964 Summer Olympics.
