= Jim Nance =

American football player (1942–1992)

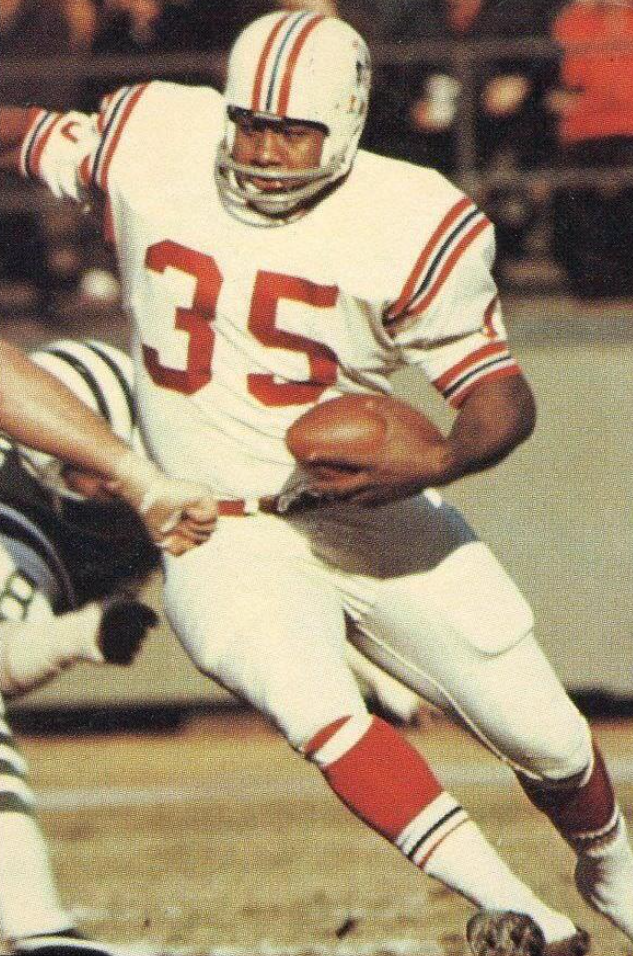
- Nance c.1968

No. 35
- Position: Fullback

Personal information
- Born: December 30, 1942; Indiana, Pennsylvania, U.S.
- Died: June 17, 1992 (aged 49); Quincy, Massachusetts, U.S.
- Listed height: 6 ft 1 in (1.85 m)
- Listed weight: 235 lb (107 kg)

Career information
- College: Syracuse
- NFL draft: 1965: 4th round, 45th overall pick
- AFL draft: 1965: 19th round, 6th overall pick

Career history
- Boston/New England Patriots (1965–1971); New York Jets (1973); Houston Texans/Shreveport Steamer (1974–1975)

Awards and highlights
- AFL MVP (1966); 3× All-AFL (1966, 1967, 1969); 2× AFL All-Star (1966, 1967); 2× AFL rushing champion (1966, 1967); AFL rushing touchdowns leader (1966); Boston Patriots All-1960s Team; New England Patriots 35th Anniversary Team; New England Patriots 50th Anniversary Team; New England Patriots Hall of Fame; Most rushing yards, AFL season: 1,458 (1966); First-team All-East (1964)

Career NFL statistics
- Rushing yards: 5,401
- Rushing average: 4
- Rushing touchdowns: 45
- Stats at Pro Football Reference

Medal record

Collegiate Wrestling

Representing the Syracuse Orange

NCAA Division I Championships
Gold medal – first place	1963 Kent	Heavyweight
Gold medal – first place	1965 Laramie	Heavyweight

James Solomon "Big Jim" Nance (December 30, 1942 – June 17, 1992) was an American professional football player who was a fullback with the Boston Patriots during their days in the American Football League (AFL). He was inducted into the Patriots Hall of Fame in 2009. He played college football for the Syracuse Orangemen.

== Early life ==
Nance was the son of a Pennsylvania coal miner, who had nine other children. Nance attended Indiana High School in Indiana, Pennsylvania, where he was a two-time Pennsylvania heavyweight wrestling champion in 1960 and 1961. It is said that the Pennsylvania Interscholastic Athletic Association (PIAA) added the heavyweight class to accommodate Nance, who was too large for their highest weight class in 1959, which was 185 pounds.

== College career ==
Starting for three years at Syracuse University, Nance tied the school record for career touchdowns and led the Orangemen football team in rushing in 1964, scoring in ten straight games. Nance also was a collegiate wrestler at Syracuse, winning the NCAA wrestling national championship at heavyweight in 1963 and 1965. He went 43-1 as a wrestler. He was inducted into the National Wrestling Hall of Fame in 2007.

== Professional career ==
Nance was a 19th round selection of the Boston Patriots in the 1965 AFL draft as well as a fourth round selection of the Chicago Bears in the 1965 NFL draft. Apparently, Patriots owner Billy Sullivan lobbied pretty hard for Nance to his friend and Syracuse coach Ben Schwartzwalder. Nance signed with the Patriots. His rookie season was generally unimpressive, with one outlet calling him a poor pass blocker. However, he would go on to lead the AFL in rushing the next two seasons, which saw him slim down from 245 to 235. He went on to become the only AFL player ever to rush for more than 1,400 yards in a season. He is still the only Patriot to win a rushing title. At 6-1 and 260 pounds, Nance was a powerful fullback who carried 299 times in 1966, for 11 touchdowns and 1,458 yards. That season, he rushed for 208 yards and two touchdowns in a 24–21 victory over the Oakland Raiders. Nance was an American Football League All-Star that year and then became the unanimous selection for the league's Most Valuable Player award (the AP vote saw him win 20 of the 27 votes). He was the last Patriot to be named an MVP for over three decades.

He was an All-Star again in 1967 when he became the only AFL player to have consecutive seasons with over 1,000 yards, this time 1,216. Ankle troubles in 1968 (which started in preseason) ended up being the first of various maladies that plagued his later years of his career. He retired as the Patriots' all-time leader in rushing touchdowns with 45, a record he still holds. Nance was ordered to do active duty for the Massachusetts National Guard. Nance did three weeks of summer training with the Massachusetts National Guard at Fr. Devens in 1968; he recruited for the Guard in select districts. In the summer of that year, he launched a scholarship fund drive for African Americans aspiring to be lawyers.

In the 1972 offseason, Nance asked to be traded. Refusing to join the Philadelphia Eagles, he was instead released in July and did not play for any team that year; at the time he temporarily stopped playing, he was the 11th leading rusher of all-time. He joined the New York Jets the following year.

In 1974, Nance played with the Houston Texans/Shreveport Steamer of the World Football League, rushing for 1,240 yards. In 1975, he ran for 767 yards before the WFL folded. He is the all-time leading rusher in the WFL with 490 carries for 2,007 yards and a 4.1 average. He rushed for 15 touchdowns in his WFL career. In the run to Super Bowl XX in the 1986 playoffs, Nance was noted as an ardent fan of the Patriots.

== NFL career statistics ==
Legend
	AFL MVP
	Led the league
**Bold**	Career high

Year	Team	Games		Rushing						Receiving					Fumbles	
Year	Team	GP	GS	Att	Yds	Avg	Y/G	Lng	TD	Rec	Yds	Avg	Lng	TD	Fum	FR
1965	BOS	**14**	7	111	321	2.9	22.9	20	5	12	83	6.9	22	0	2	0
1966	BOS	**14**	**14**	**299**	**1,458**	**4.9**	**104.1**	**65**	**11**	8	103	**12.9**	**45**	0	7	0
1967	BOS	**14**	**14**	269	1,216	4.5	86.9	53	7	22	**196**	8.9	36	**1**	**10**	**1**
1968	BOS	12	12	177	593	3.4	49.4	30	4	14	51	3.6	13	0	2	0
1969	BOS	**14**	**14**	193	750	3.9	53.6	43	6	**29**	168	5.8	27	0	1	0
1970	BOS	13	13	145	522	3.6	40.2	21	7	26	148	5.7	16	0	6	0
1971	NE	13	13	129	463	3.6	35.6	50	5	18	95	5.3	12	0	2	**1**
1973	NYJ	7	1	18	78	4.3	11.1	18	0	4	26	6.5	9	0	0	0
Career		101	88	1,341	5,401	4.0	53.5	65	45	133	870	6.5	45	1	30	2

== Personal life ==
Nance was married twice and had a child with each wife. In 1983, Nance suffered a heart attack, and suffered a stroke while being treated in hospital. His left arm was paralyzed, and it was feared he might not walk again, but after he reduced his weight from 300 to 275 lbs by 1984 he was able to walk again. In 1991 his oldest daughter Nicole suffered an auto accident that left her partially paralyzed, and died soon after Nance returned home from staying by her bedside. Nance died on June 17, 1992, of acute cardiac arrhythmia in Quincy, Massachusetts. Funeral services were held in Indiana, Pennsylvania and he was buried at Oakland Cemetery.
