= Dinko Petrov =

Bulgarian wrestler (born 1935)

Medal record

Men's Greco-Roman wrestling

Representing Bulgaria

Olympic Games
Bronze medal – third place	1960 Rome	Bantamweight

World Championships
Bronze medal – third place	1963 Helsingborg	Bantamweight

World Cup
Silver medal – second place	1956 Istanbul	Bantamweight

Dinko Petrov (Bulgarian: Динко Петров; born 10 March 1935) is a Bulgarian former wrestler who competed in the 1956 Summer Olympics, in the 1960 Summer Olympics, and in the 1964 Summer Olympics.
