= Ewald Tauer =

German wrestler (1941–2017)

Personal information
- Nationality: German
- Born: 8 June 1941 Munich, Germany
- Died: November 2017 (aged 76) Munich

Sport
- Sport: Wrestling

Ewald Tauer (8 June 1941 – November 2017) was a German wrestler. He competed in the men's Greco-Roman bantamweight at the 1960 Summer Olympics.
