= Dale Lewis (wrestler) =

American wrestler (1933–1997)

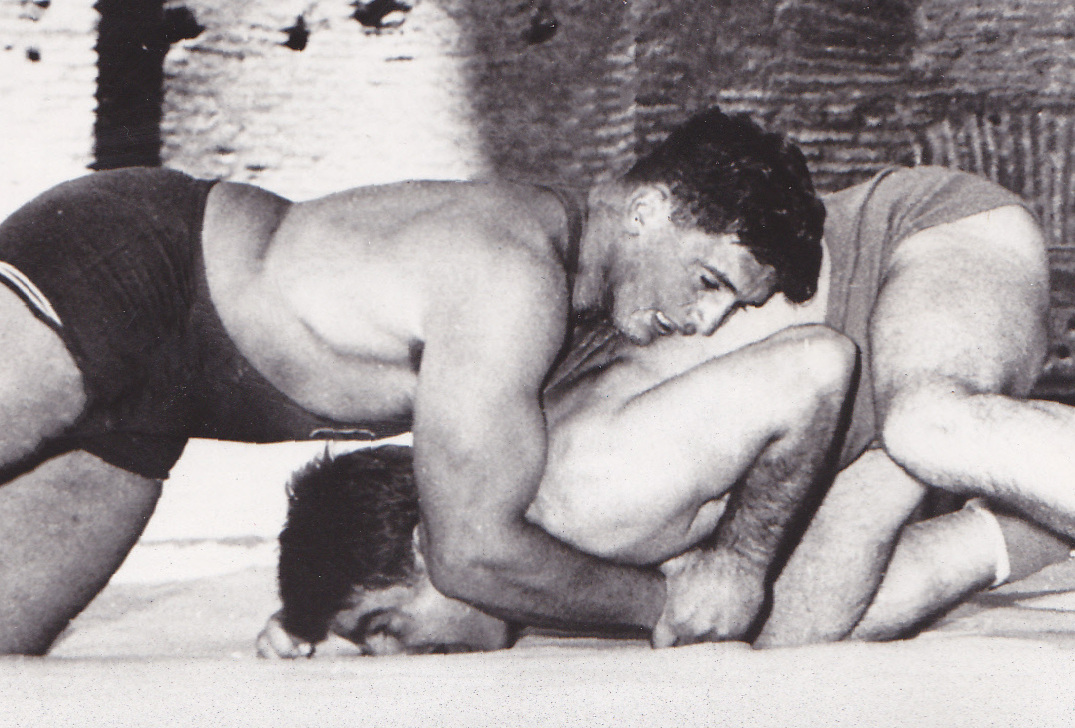
- Lewis (top) at the 1960 Olympics

Personal information
- Nickname: The Professor
- Born: August 29, 1933 Little Black, Wisconsin, U.S.
- Died: August 30, 1997 (aged 64) Oklahoma City, Oklahoma, U.S.
- Height: 6 ft 1 in (185 cm)
- Weight: 249 lb (113 kg)

Sport
- Country: United States
- Sport: Wrestling; Professional Wrestling
- Events: Greco-Roman; Folkstyle
- College team: Oklahoma
- Team: USA
Medal record
Representing the United States
Men's Greco-Roman wrestling
Pan American Games
Gold medal – first place	1959 Chicago	+97 kg
Collegiate Wrestling
Representing the Oklahoma Sooners
NCAA Championships
Gold medal – first place	1960 College Park	Heavyweight
Gold medal – first place	1961 Corvallis	Heavyweight

Dale Folsom Lewis (August 29, 1933 – August 30, 1997) was an American wrestler who competed in the Greco-Roman heavyweight division at the 1956 and 1960 Summer Olympics and later a professional wrestler. He won the 1959 Pan-American Games in Greco-Roman wrestling. Lewis was also a two-time NCAA wrestling champion at Oklahoma.

After graduating from college he became a professional wrestler from 1961 until 1980.

== Championships and accomplishments ==
- American Wrestling Association
  - AWA Nebraska Heavyweight Championship (1 time)
  - AWA Midwest Heavyweight Championship (1 time)
  - AWA Midwest Tag Team Championship (3 times) - with Stan Pulaski (2) and Francis St. Claire (1)
- George Tragos/Lou Thesz Professional Wrestling Hall of Fame
  - Class of 2007
- Georgia Championship Wrestling
  - NWA Georgia Heavyweight Championship (1 time)
- St. Louis Wrestling Club
  - NWA United National Championship (1 time)
- Championship Wrestling From Florida
  - NWA Brass Knuckles Championship (Florida version) 2 times
  - NWA Florida Heavyweight Championship (1 time)
- World Championship Wrestling (Australia)
  - NWA Austra-Asian Tag Team Championship (9 times) - with Bob Griffin (1 time)
