= Mikhail Theodoropoulos =

Greek wrestler

Personal information
- Nationality: Greek
- Born: 1933 (age 92–93) Stamata, Greece

Sport
- Sport: Wrestling

Mikhail Theodoropoulos (born 1933) is a Greek wrestler. He competed in the men's Greco-Roman bantamweight at the 1960 Summer Olympics.
