= Orlando Gonçalves =

Portuguese wrestler (born 1938)

Personal information
- Nationality: Portuguese
- Born: 13 April 1938 (age 88) Marinha Grande, Portugal

Sport
- Sport: Wrestling

Orlando Gonçalves (born 13 April 1938) is a Portuguese wrestler. He competed at the 1960 Summer Olympics and the 1972 Summer Olympics.
