= Debrunner Koenig Holding =

Swiss steel concrete reinforcement manufacturer

Debrunner Koenig AG
- Type: Aktiengesellschaft
- Industry: wholesale
- Founded: 1755 / 1988
- Headquarters: St. Gallen, Switzerland
- Key people: Thomas Liner, CEO
- Revenue: CHF 981 million
- Number of employees: 1,429 (2020)

Debrunner Koenig AG is the largest Swiss producer of steel reinforcements for reinforced concrete. The company also sells steel and metals, metal services, and technical products. As of 2026, the group has about 1350 employees at 40 locations across Switzerland. Debrunner Koenig has been headquartered in the Raiffeisen building on the Roter Platz in St. Gallen since 2025.

The company was formed in 1988 through the merger of the traditional St. Gallen-based Debrunner Group, whose roots go back to 1755, with the Koenig Group. Since 1997 it has belonged to the German company Klöckner & Co.

== Field of activity ==
The group consists of four product divisions: Reinforcements, Steel & Metals, Metal Service and Technical Products, which include the Debrunner Acifer, Debrunner Acifer Bewehrungen, Metall Service Menziken and Bewetec companies.

The Reinforcements product division supplies different types of reinforcing steels as well as complete products used for reinforcement. The Steel & Metals product division produces steel products such as girders, profiles and sheets and offers various processing services. The Metal Service division manufactures covering steel, aluminium and other metals. Technical Products division produces components for construction and other industries such as tools, machinery, and occupational safety division.

== History ==
The Debrunner Koenig Group traces its roots back to 1755, when the “Hochreutiner'sche Eisenhandlung” (hardware store) opened in St. Gallen. The Hochreutiner family ran the business for four generations.

In 1862, with no further direct successor forthcoming, Theodor Scherrer took the helm. He was followed in 1885 by Jean Debrunner, under whose leadership the company expanded and was renamed Debrunner & Cie in 1911. The First World War and post-war deprivations then brought an abrupt end to the thriving economy spawned by industrialisation.

In 1930, the former limited partnership became a joint-stock company. The company was passed on to the next generation, with Henri Debrunner and Max Scherrer both following in their fathers’ footsteps. The steel and metal trade recovered very slowly after the years of crisis, only to experience another setback with the outbreak of the Second World War.

With the strong economic recovery during the post-war years, Debrunner proceeded to grow over the course of four decades to become a corporate group doing business nationwide. The Debrunner Group then merged with the Koenig Group in 1988. The former Debrunner AG continued to be run as an operational subsidiary. This subsidiary acquired the Acifer Group in 1996, resulting in the founding of Debrunner Acifer AG and further regional companies.

In late 2005, Debrunner Koenig Holding acquired the Metall Service business unit from Alu Menziken Holding. The company was incorporated into the Debrunner Koenig Group as an independent metals division and today does business under the name Metall Service Menziken AG.

In 2008, the subsidiary Koenig Verbindungstechnik AG, specialising in connection, fastening and sealing technology, was spun off from Debrunner Koenig Holding in a management buy-out and sold to the Swiss private equity company Capvis.

The company Koenig Feinstahl AG discontinued its activities for the metalworking industry such as value-added cutting, warehousing and distribution services at the end of 2015.
