= Dennis Demmers =

Dutch footballer and coach

Personal information
- Date of birth: 21 March 1975 (age 51)
- Place of birth: Deventer, Netherlands

Team information
- Current team: Netherlands (analyst)

Managerial career
- Years: Team
- 1998–2002: Lemele
- 2002–2007: SVZW
- 2007–2008: Berkum
- 2008–2012: Excelsior '31
- 2009–2010: Colmschate '33
- 2012–2015: Go Ahead Eagles (assistant)
- 2015–2016: Go Ahead Eagles
- 2016: Al Taawoun (assistant)
- 2017–2018: Jong Twente

Dennis Demmers (21 March 1975) is a Dutch football coach and former footballer. He is best known as a coach in amateur football. In 2010, when coaching both Excelsior '31 (Saturday) and Colmschate '33 (Sunday) he received the Rinus Michels Award.

In professional soccer, he was an assistant manager, scout and manager (2015–2016) of Go Ahead Eagles. He went on to become assistant coach and video analyst of Al-Taawoun FC in Saudi Arabia. Head coach Darije Kalezić was fired after five games, as was Demmers.

Demmers was added to the Netherlands national team staff to analyse players and teams for the upcoming UEFA Euro 2020, alongside fellow coaches Cees Lok and Gert Aandewiel.
