= Ali Banihashemi =

Iranian wrestler

Personal information
- Nationality: Iranian
- Born: April 5, 1934 Tehran, Iran
- Died: September 4, 1964 (aged 30)

Sport
- Sport: Wrestling

Ali Banihashemi (Persian: علی بنی‌هاشمی, 5 April 1934 - 4 September 1964) was an Iranian wrestler. He competed in the men's Greco-Roman bantamweight at the 1960 Summer Olympics.
