= Jan Everse =

Jan Everse may refer to:

- Jan Everse (footballer, born 1954), Dutch footballer and manager
- Jan Everse Sr (1922–1974), Dutch footballer
