= Richard Debrunner =

Swiss wrestler

Personal information
- Nationality: Swiss
- Born: 3 November 1937 (age 89) Thurgau, Switzerland

Sport
- Sport: Wrestling

Richard Debrunner (born 3 November 1937) is a Swiss former wrestler. He competed in the men's Greco-Roman bantamweight at the 1960 Summer Olympics.
