= Yaşar Yılmaz =

Turkish wrestler (born 1930)

Personal information
- Born: 4 March 1930 (age 96) Rize, Turkey

Sport
- Country: Turkey
- Sport: Olympic wrestling
- Event: Men's Greco-Roman Wrestling
Medal record
Representing Turkey
World Championships
Silver medal – second place	1962 Yokohama	Featherweight
Silver medal – second place	1958 Budapest	Bantamweight
Silver medal – second place	1955 Karlsruhe	Bantamweight
World Cup
Gold medal – first place	1956 Istanbul	Bantamweight

Yaşar Yılmaz (born 4 March 1930) is a Turkish former Olympian sports wrestler in the Bantamweight and Featherweight division of Men's Greco-Roman style. He won three times the silver medal at the FILA Wrestling World Championships in 1955, 1958 and 1962. He competed at the 1956 Summer Olympics, and the 1960 Summer Olympics in Rome and placed fifth.
