= Michel Nakouzi =

Lebanese wrestler (1932–2022)

Personal information
- Nationality: Lebanese
- Born: 5 May 1932 Beirut, Lebanon
- Died: March 2022 (aged 89)

Sport
- Sport: Wrestling

Michel Nakouzi (5 May 1932 – March 2022) was a Lebanese wrestler. He competed in the men's Greco-Roman bantamweight at the 1960 Summer Olympics. Nakouzi died in March 2022, at the age of 89.
