= 1961 NCAA wrestling championships =

American collegiate wrestling tournament

1961 NCAA Wrestling Championships
Tournament information
- Sport: College wrestling
- Location: Corvallis, Oregon
- Dates: March 23rd, 1961–March 25th, 1961
- Host(s): Oregon State University

Final positions
- Champions: Oklahoma State (22nd title)
- 2nd place: Oklahoma
- 3rd place: Iowa State
- MVP: Gray Simons (Lock Haven University)

The 1961 NCAA Wrestling Championships were the 31st NCAA wrestling championships to be held. Oregon State University hosted the tournament in Corvallis, Oregon.

Oklahoma State took home the team championship with 82 points and having two individual champions.

Gray Simons of Lock Haven University was named the Most Outstanding Wrestler.

== Team results ==
Rank	School	Points
1	Oklahoma State	82
2	Oklahoma	63
3	Iowa State	29
4	Oregon State	28
5	Pittsburgh	26
6	Lehigh	24
T-7	Penn State	20
T-7	Michigan State	20
9	Northern Iowa	19
10	Michigan	18

== Individual finals ==
Weight class	Championship match (champion in boldface)
115 lbs	**Gray Simons**, Lock Haven DEC Dick Wilson, Toledo, 7-3
123 lbs	**DuWayne Mille**, Oklahoma DEC Masaaki Hatta, Oklahoma State, 6-5
130 lbs	**Larry Lauchle**, Pittsburgh DEC Dave Jensen, Northern Iowa, 7-0
137 lbs	**Norm Young**, Michigan State DEC Ron Finley, Oregon State, 5-2
147 lbs	**Larry Hayes**, Iowa State DEC Ron Pifer, Penn State, 4-0
157 lbs	**Phil Kinyon**, Oklahoma State DEC Kirk Pendleton, Lehigh, 3-0
167 lbs	**Don Conway**, Oregon State DEC Bruce Campbell, Oklahoma State 7-4
177 lbs	**Bob Johnson**, Oklahoma State DEC Wayne Baughman, Oklahoma, 9-5
191 lbs	**Lenard Lordino**, Northern Colorado DEC Nick Kohls, Colorado State, 4-0
UNL	**Dale Lewis**, Oklahoma DEC Ted Ellis, Oklahoma State, 3-2
