= 1962 NCAA wrestling championships =

American collegiate wrestling tournament

1962 NCAA Wrestling Championships
Tournament information
- Sport: College wrestling
- Location: Stillwater, Oklahoma
- Dates: March 22nd, 1962–March 24th, 1962
- Host(s): Oklahoma State University

Final positions
- Champions: Oklahoma State (23rd title)
- 2nd place: Oklahoma
- 3rd place: Iowa
- MVP: Gray Simons (Lock Haven University)

The 1962 NCAA Wrestling Championships were the 32nd NCAA wrestling championships to be held. Oklahoma State hosted the tournament in Stillwater, Oklahoma.

Oklahoma State took home the team championship with 82 points and having three individual champions.

Gray Simons of Lock Haven University was named the Most Outstanding Wrestler.

== Team results ==
Rank	School	Points
1	Oklahoma State	82
2	Oklahoma	45
3	Iowa	34
4	Lehigh	27
5	Northern Iowa	23
T-6	Southern Illinois - Carbondale	19
T-6	Pittsburgh	19
T-6	Wisconsin	19
T-9	Nebraska	18
T-9	Michigan State	18

== Individual finals ==
Weight class	Championship match (champion in boldface)
115 lbs	**Gray Simons**, Lock Haven DEC Mark McCracken, Oklahoma State, 7-2
123 lbs	**Masaaki Hatta**, Oklahoma State DEC Frank Freeman, Northern Iowa, 7-4
130 lbs	**Mickey Martin**, Oklahoma DEC Al DeLeon, Minnesota State, 5-2
137 lbs	**Bill Carter**, Oklahoma DEC Bill Dotson, Northern Iowa, 6-4
147 lbs	**Mike Natvig**, Army DEC Kirk Pendleton, Lehigh, 5-4
157 lbs	**Jack Flasche**, Northern Colorado DEC Phil Kinyon, Oklahoma State, 5-2
167 lbs	**Ronnie Clinton**, Oklahoma State DEC Terry Isaacson, Air Force 3-2
177 lbs	**Bob Johnson**, Oklahoma State DEC Dean Lahr, Colorado, 3-2
191 lbs	**Wayne Baughman**, Oklahoma DEC Joe James, Oklahoma State, 2-1
UNL	**Sherwyn Thorson**, Iowa FALL Roger Pillath, Wisconsin, 3:21
