= Oleg Karavaev =

Soviet wrestler (1936–1978)

Personal information
- Full name: Oleg Nikolayevich Karavaev
- Born: 20 May 1936 Minsk, Byelorussian SSR, Soviet Union
- Died: 23 August 1978 (aged 42) Minsk, Byelorussian SSR, Soviet Union
- Height: 161 cm (5 ft 3 in)
- Weight: 57 kg (126 lb)

Sport
- Sport: Greco-Roman wrestling
- Club: Burevestnik Minsk
Medal record
Representing the Soviet Union
Olympic Games
Gold medal – first place	1960 Rome	57 kg
World Championships
Gold medal – first place	1958 Budapest	57 kg
Gold medal – first place	1961 Yokohama	57 kg

Oleg Nikolayevich Karavaev (Russian: Олег Николаевич Караваев, 20 May 1936 – 23 August 1978) was a Soviet bantamweight Greco-Roman wrestler. He won the world title in 1958 and 1961 and an Olympic gold medal in 1960.

He was Jewish. Karavaev took up wrestling aged 16 and quickly became one of the most technically gifted Soviet wrestlers. Between 1956 and 1962 he rarely lost a bout, and won the Soviet title every year except for 1961. In 1964 he failed to qualify for the Tokyo Olympics, and retired to become a wrestling coach, heading the Belorussian team through the late 1960s. From 1971 until his death he worked at his native sports society Burevestnik. The illness in 1978 led to his death at the age 42. Since 1992, an annual wrestling tournament has been held in his honor in his native Minsk.

== See also ==
- List of select Jewish wrestlers
