= Fritz Stange =

German wrestler (1936–2013)

Personal information
- Nationality: German
- Born: 20 September 1936; Ludwigsburg, Germany
- Died: 4 August 2013 (aged 76); Stuttgart, Germany

Sport
- Sport: Wrestling

Fritz Stange (20 September 1936 – 4 August 2013) was a German wrestler. He competed at the 1960 Summer Olympics, the 1964 Summer Olympics and the 1968 Summer Olympics.
