= Masamitsu Ichiguchi =

Japanese Greco-Roman wrestler

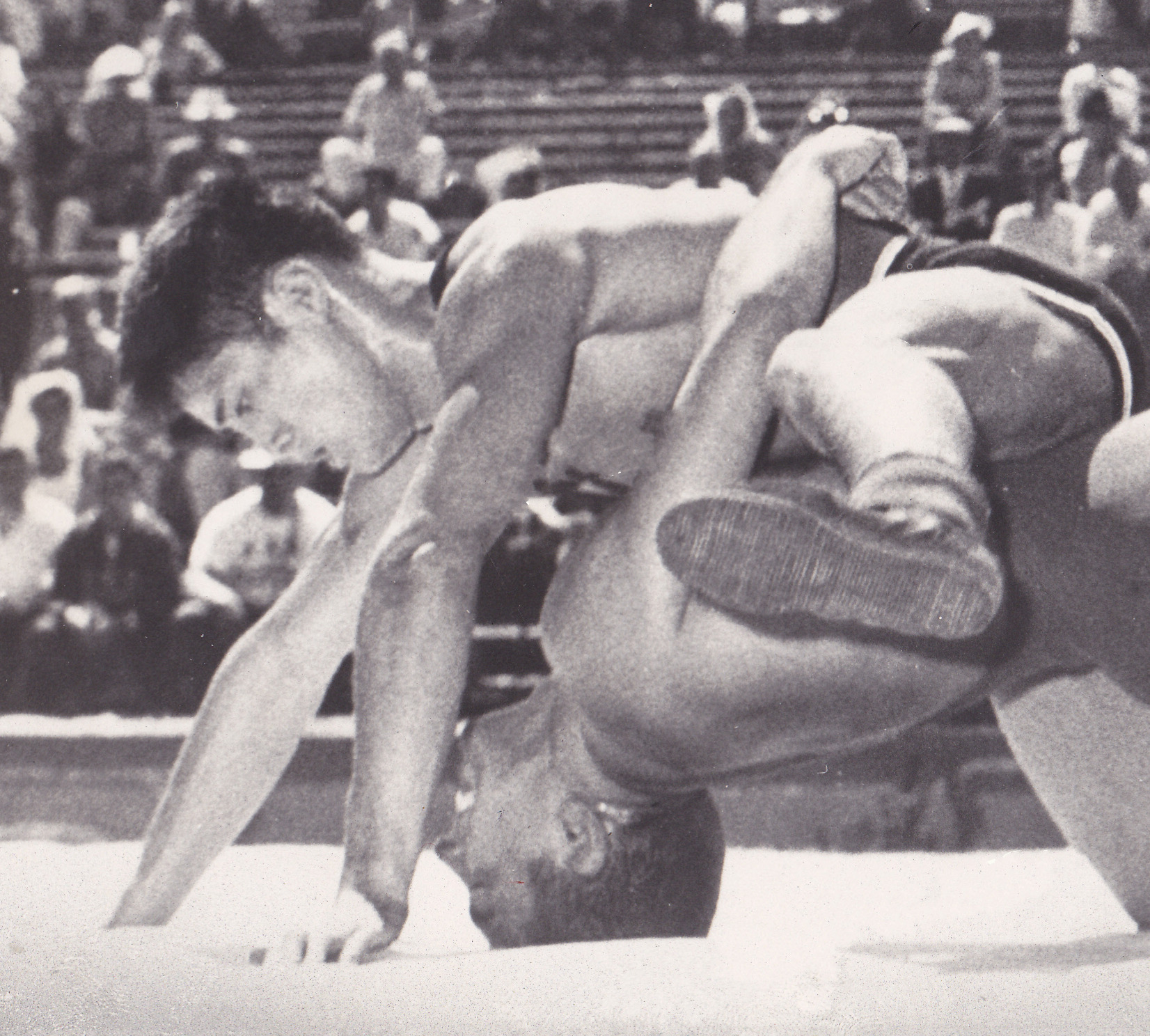
- Masamitsu Ichiguchi (top) at the 1960 Olympics

Personal information
- Born: January 12, 1940 (age 86) Osaka, Japan
- Height: 1.61 m (5 ft 3 in)

Sport
- Sport: Greco-Roman wrestling
Medal record
Men's Greco-Roman wrestling
Representing Japan
Olympic Games
Gold medal – first place	1964 Tokyo	57 kg
World Championships
Gold medal – first place	1962 Toledo	57 kg
Asian Games
Gold medal – first place	1962 Jakarta	57 kg

Masamitsu Ichiguchi (市口 政光, Ichiguchi Masamitsu; born January 12, 1940) is a Japanese retired wrestler. He competed in the Greco-Roman bantamweight event at the 1960 and 1964 Olympics and finished in seventh and first place, respectively. Earlier in 1962 he won the world championships and Asian Games in the same event.
