= John Tveiten =

Norwegian wrestler

Personal information
- Nationality: Norwegian
- Born: 15 November 1933 Notodden, Norway
- Died: 23 November 1994 (aged 61) Notodden, Norway

Sport
- Sport: Wrestling

John Tveiten (15 November 1933 – 23 November 1994) was a Norwegian wrestler. He competed in the men's Greco-Roman bantamweight at the 1960 Summer Olympics.
