= Jiří Švec =

Czech wrestler

Personal information
- Nationality: Czech
- Born: 20 November 1935 Netolice, Czechoslovakia
- Died: 30 June 2014 (aged 78)

Sport
- Sport: Wrestling
Medal record
Representing Czechoslovakia
World Championships
Silver medal – second place	1963 Helsingborg	57 kg
Bronze medal – third place	1961 Yokohama	57 kg
European Championships
Silver medal – second place	1968 Västerås	63 kg
Bronze medal – third place	1967 Istanbul	63 kg

Jiří Švec (20 November 1935 – 30 June 2014) was a Czech wrestler. He competed at the 1960 Summer Olympics, the 1964 Summer Olympics and the 1968 Summer Olympics.
