= Franz Brunner (wrestler) =

Austrian wrestler

Personal information
- Nationality: Austrian
- Born: 10 July 1931 Vienna, Austria
- Died: 14 December 2014 (aged 83)

Sport
- Sport: Wrestling

Franz Brunner (10 July 1931 – 14 December 2014) was an Austrian Greco-Roman wrestler. He competed at the 1952 Summer Olympics, the 1956 Summer Olympics and the 1960 Summer Olympics. At the 1955 World Championship, he finished in 4th place.

Competing as a flyweight at his first Olympics, he was a bantamweight at both the 1956 and 1960 Olympics. Brunner was a policeman by profession.
