= Gilberto Gramellini =

Italian wrestler

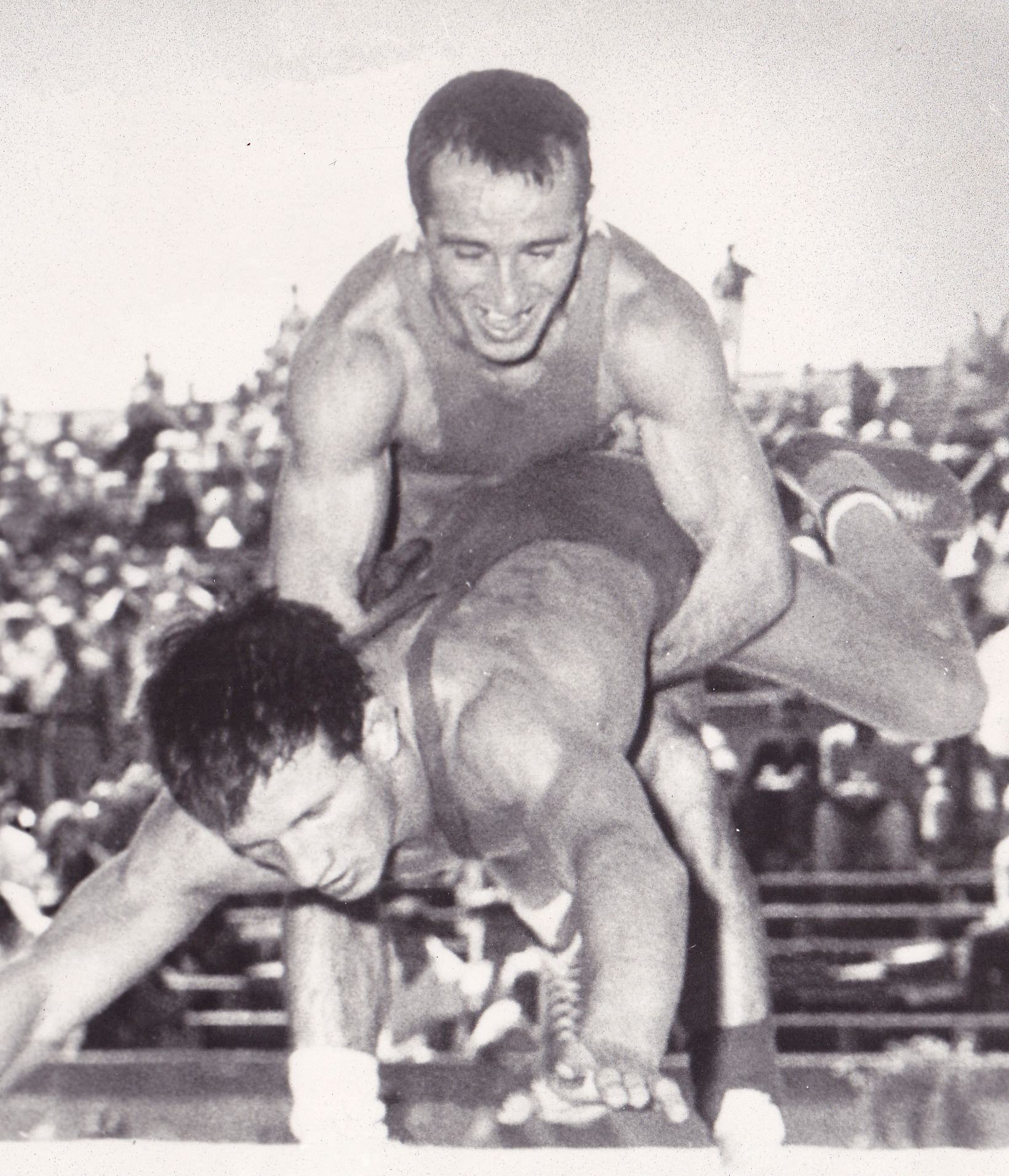
- Gilberto Gramellini (top) vs Bernard Knitter at the 1960 Olympics

Personal information
- Born: 17 November 1930 Forlì, Italy
- Died: 18 December 2013 (aged 83)
- Height: 1.62 m (5 ft 4 in)

Sport
- Sport: Greco-Roman wrestling

Gilberto Gramellini (17 November 1930 – 18 December 2013) was an Italian wrestler. Gramellini competed in the Greco-Roman wrestling bantamweight division at the 1960 Summer Olympics and finished in ninth place.
