= Loek Alflen =

Dutch wrestler (1933–2015)

Loek Alflen (29 August 1933 – 17 August 2015) was a Dutch wrestler. He was Dutch national champion in the flyweight category between 1951 and 1970, and competed at the 1960 Olympics.

Alflen was born in Utrecht, he was raised in a family with a total of thirteen children. As a six-year-old he became a member of the wrestling club De Halter, eventually all his seven brothers also joined. Five of the brothers eventually became national champions. Between 1951 and 1970 Alflen was the Dutch national champion in the flyweight category. He was 1.56 meters tall. He missed the 1956 Summer Olympics due to a Dutch boycott, which was in place due to the Soviet Union's role in the Hungarian Revolution of 1956. He finished in thirteenth position in his division during the wrestling at the 1960 Summer Olympics.

Loek Alfen died after a prolonged illness on 17 August 2015, aged 81. Rob Alflen is his son.
