= NAIA men's wrestling championship =

Annual college wrestling tournament

- Sport: Wrestling
- Founded: 1958
- Country: United States and Canada
- Most recent champion: Grand View (14)
- Website: NAIA.com

The NAIA wrestling championship is the annual tournament to determine the national champions of NAIA men's collegiate wrestling in the United States and Canada. It has been held annually since 1958. The tournament consists of both a team national title and individual titles at various weight classes.

The most successful program is the Grand View Vikings, with fourteen team NAIA national titles.

The current champion is Grand View, who won their fourteenth team national title in 2026.

== Champions ==
| Year | Host city | Team championship | | | |
| Year | Host city | Winner | Points | Runner-up | Points |
|---|---|---|---|---|---|
| 1958 | Mankato, Minnesota | Mankato State ^{(1)} | 97 | Iowa State Teachers | 69 |
| 1959 | DeKalb, Illinois | Mankato State ^{(2)} | 64 | Southern Illinois | 52 |
| 1960 | Lock Haven, Pennsylvania | Bloomsburg State ^{(1)} | 79 | Southern Illinois | 73 |
| 1961 | Golden, Colorado | Lock Haven State ^{(1)} | 50 | Colorado Mines | 35 |
| 1962 | Winona, Minnesota | Bloomsburg State ^{(2)} | 56 | Lock Haven State | 47 |
| 1963 | Bloomsburg, Pennsylvania | Lock Haven State ^{(2)} | 61 | Bloomsburg State | 60 |
| 1964 | Spearfish, South Dakota | Moorhead State ^{(1)} | 65 | Lock Haven State | 62 |
| 1965 | Terre Haute, Indiana | Bloomsburg State ^{(3)} | 60 | Lock Haven State | 50 |
| 1966 | St. Cloud, Minnesota | Lock Haven State ^{(3)} | 107 | Moorhead State | 64 |
| 1967 | Lock Haven, Pennsylvania | Lock Haven State ^{(4)} | 80 | Adams State | 69 |
| 1968 | Alamosa, Colorado | Adams State ^{(1)} | 106 | Nebraska–Omaha | 77 |
| 1969 | Omaha, Nebraska | Adams State ^{(2)} | 98 | Nebraska–Omaha | 84 |
| 1970 | Superior, Wisconsin | Nebraska–Omaha ^{(1)} | 86 | Adams State | 58 |
| 1971 | Boone, North Carolina | Central Washington State ^{(1)} | 56 | Bloomsburg State | 49 |
| 1972 | Klamath Falls, Oregon | Adams State ^{(3)} | 64 | Nebraska–Omaha | 53.5 |
| 1973 | Sioux City, Iowa | Adams State ^{(4)} | 62.5 | Central State (OK) | 48.5 |
| 1974 | River Falls, Wisconsin | Central Washington State ^{(2)} | 102 | Central State (OK) | 80.5 |
| 1975 | Sioux City, Iowa | Adams State ^{(5)} | 61 | Augsburg | 55 |
| 1976 | Edinboro, Pennsylvania | Adams State ^{(6)} | 83.5 | Eastern Washington State | 70.25 |
| 1977 | Cheney, Washington | Eastern Washington ^{(1)} | 90.75 | Grand Valley State | 89 |
| 1978 | Whitewater, Wisconsin | Southern Oregon State ^{(1)} | 81.5 | Grand Valley State | 78.75 |
| 1979 | Wheeling, West Virginia | Central State (OK) ^{(1)} | 102.5 | Adams State | 69 |
| 1980 | Hays, Kansas | Adams State ^{(7)} | 86 | Huron | 76.5 |
| 1981 | Edmond, Oklahoma | Central State (OK) ^{(2)} | 155.25 | Adams State | 69.5 |
| 1982 | Forest Grove, Oregon | Central State (OK) ^{(3)} | 105.5 | Adams State | 88.75 |
| 1983 | Minot, North Dakota | Southern Oregon State ^{(2)} | 98.5 | Simon Fraser | 89.75 |
| 1984 | Edmond, Oklahoma | Central State (OK) ^{(4)} | 122.25 | Jamestown | 89.25 |
| 1985 | Jamestown, North Dakota | Central State (OK) ^{(5)} | 124.25 | Southern Colorado | 80.5 |
| 1986 | Minot, North Dakota | Central State (OK) ^{(6)} | 98.5 | Southern Oregon | 91.25 |
| 1987 | West Liberty, West Virginia | Central State (OK) ^{(7)} | 92.5 | Alaska Pacific | 71.5 |
| 1988 | Tacoma, Washington | Simon Fraser ^{(1)} | 140.5 | Central State (OK) | 89 |
| 1989 | Jamestown, North Dakota | Central State (OK) ^{(8)} | 105 | Simon Fraser | 92 |
| 1990 | Hays, Kansas | Adams State ^{(8)} | 94 | Northern Montana | 83.5 |
| 1991 | Butte, Montana | Northern Montana ^{(1)} | 100.75 | Southern Colorado | 88 |
| 1992 | Hays, Kansas | Northern Montana ^{(2)} | 109 | Adams State | 102.75 |
| 1993 | Butte, Montana | Simon Fraser ^{(1)} | 123.25 | Northern Montana | 95.25 |
| 1994 | Butte, Montana | Southern Oregon ^{(3)} Western Montana ^{(1)} | 94.5 | Mary | 92.25 |
| 1995 | Jamestown, North Dakota | Findlay ^{(1)} | 147 | West Liberty State | 100 |
| 1996 | Jamestown, North Dakota | Missouri Valley ^{(1)} | 124 | Mary | 107.5 |
| 1997 | Jamestown, North Dakota | Missouri Valley ^{(1)} | 162.5 | Mary | 133.5 |
| 1998 | Primm, Nevada | Montana State–Northern ^{(3)} | 162.5 | Missouri Valley | 114.5 |
| 1999 | St. Charles, Missouri | Montana State–Northern ^{(4)} | 151.5 | Findlay (OH) | 147 |
| 2000 | St. Charles, Missouri | Montana State–Northern ^{(5)} | 137.5 | Missouri Valley | 118.5 |
| 2001 | St. Charles, Missouri | Southern Oregon ^{(4)} | 158 | Missouri Valley | 151.5 |
| 2002 | Great Falls, Montana | Lindenwood ^{(1)} | 180 | Montana State–Northern | 167 |
| 2003 | Great Falls, Montana | Missouri Valley ^{(3)} | 139.5 | Lindenwood | 134.5 |
| 2004 | Great Falls, Montana | Montana State–Northern ^{(6)} | 169.5 | Menlo (CA) | 133.5 |
| 2005 | Sioux City, Iowa | Lindenwood ^{(2)} | 178.5 | Missouri Valley | 128.5 |
| 2006 | Sioux City, Iowa | Dana ^{(1)} | 193 | Lindenwood | 164 |
| 2007 | Sioux City, Iowa | Lindenwood ^{(3)} | 177 | Embry–Riddle (AZ) | 110 |
| 2008 | Sioux City, Iowa | Lindenwood ^{(4)} | 130 | McKendree | 109.5 |
| 2009 | Oklahoma City, Oklahoma | Lindenwood ^{(5)} | 167 | Southern Oregon | 125.5 |
| 2010 | Oklahoma City, Oklahoma | Notre Dame (OH) ^{(1)} | 179.5 | Southern Oregon | 120 |
| 2011 | Cedar Rapids, Iowa | Notre Dame (OH) ^{(2)} | 170 | Lindenwood | 141 |
| 2012 | Des Moines, Iowa | Grand View ^{(1)} | 172 | Southern Oregon | 141 |
| 2013 | Des Moines, Iowa | Grand View ^{(2)} | 159 | Southern Oregon | 153 |
| 2014 | Topeka, Kansas | Grand View ^{(3)} | 193 | Great Falls | 84.5 |
| 2015 | Topeka, Kansas | Grand View ^{(4)} | 147.5 | Southern Oregon | 109.0 |
| 2016 | Topeka, Kansas | Grand View ^{(5)} | 210 | Montana State-Northern | 104 |
| 2017 | Topeka, Kansas | Grand View ^{(6)} | 234.5 | Lindsey Wilson (KY) | 74.5 |
| 2018 | Des Moines, IA | Grand View ^{(7)} | 171.5 | Cumberlands (KY) | 107 |
| 2019 | Des Moines, IA | Grand View ^{(8)} | 219.0 | Lindsey Wilson (KY) | 85.0 |
| 2020 | Wichita, KS | Grand View ^{(9)} | 157 | Menlo (CA) | 84.5 |
| 2021 | Wichita, KS | Life (GA) ^{(1)} | 158 | Grand View | 153 |
| 2022 | Wichita, KS | Grand View ^{(10)} | 206.5 | Life (GA) | 149 |
| 2023 | Wichita, KS | Grand View ^{(11)} | 206 | Life (GA) | 157.5 |
| 2024 | Wichita, KS | Grand View ^{(12)} | 209.5 | Life (GA) | 154 |
| 2025 | Wichita, KS | Grand View ^{(13)} | 209 | Life (GA) | 149 |
| 2026 | Wichita, KS | Grand View ^{(14)} | 192.5 | Life (GA) | 166 |

== Team titles ==
- List updated through the 2026 championships

| Team | # | Winning years |
|---|---|---|
| Grand View | 14 | 2012, 2013, 2014, 2015, 2016, 2017, 2018, 2019, 2020, 2022, 2023, 2024, 2025, 2026 |
| Adams State | 8 | 1968, 1969, 1972, 1973, 1975, 1976, 1980, 1990 |
| Central Oklahoma | 8 | 1979, 1981, 1982, 1984, 1985, 1986, 1987, 1989^{A} |
| Montana State–Northern | 6 | 1991, 1992, 1998, 1999, 2000, 2004^{B} |
| Lindenwood | 5 | 2002, 2005, 2007, 2008, 2009 |
| Lock Haven | 4 | 1961, 1963, 1966, 1967^{C} |
| Southern Oregon | 4 | 1978, 1983, 1994, 2001 |
| Bloomsburg | 3 | 1960, 1962, 1965^{D} |
| Missouri Valley | 3 | 1996, 1997, 2003 |
| Central Washington | 2 | 1971, 1974^{E} |
| Minnesota State | 2 | 1958, 1959^{F} |
| Notre Dame (OH) | 2 | 2010, 2011 |
| Simon Fraser | 2 | 1988, 1993 |
| Dana | 1 | 2006 |
| Eastern Washington | 1 | 1977 |
| Findlay | 1 | 1995 |
| Life | 1 | 2021 |
| Minnesota State Moorhead | 1 | 1964^{G} |
| Nebraska–Omaha | 1 | 1970^{H} |
| Western Montana | 1 | 1994^{I} |

- ^{A} = Central State (OK) is now Central Oklahoma
- ^{B} = Northern Montana is now Montana State–Northern
- ^{C} = Lock Haven State is now Lock Haven
- ^{D} = Bloomsburg State is now Bloomsburg
- ^{E} = Central Washington State (OK) is now Central Washington
- ^{F} = Mankato State is now Minnesota State
- ^{G} = Moorhead State is now Minnesota State Moorhead
- ^{H} = Nebraska–Omaha now brands as Omaha
- ^{I} = Western Montana is now Montana Western

== See also ==
- NAIA women's wrestling championship
- NCAA wrestling championships (Division I, Division II, Division III)
