= Rob Alflen =

Dutch football manager and former player

Personal information
- Date of birth: 7 May 1968 (age 58)
- Place of birth: Utrecht, Netherlands
- Height: 1.80 m (5 ft 11 in)
- Position: Midfielder

Senior career*
Years	Team	Apps	(Gls)
1985–1991	Utrecht	142	(16)
1991–1995	Ajax	26	(5)
1995–1996	Vitesse	7	(0)
1996–1997	Sparta Rotterdam	25	(1)
1997–1999	Heracles	52	(10)
1999–2000	Cambuur	26	(0)
Total		278	(32)

International career
1988–1989	Netherlands U21	6	(0)

Managerial career
- 2006–2008: FC De Bilt
- 2007–2008: Haarlem (assistant)
- 2008–2010: FC Breukelen
- 2009–2011: Jong Utrecht
- 2014–2015: Utrecht
- 2018–2019: Helmond Sport
- 2020–2022: Fortuna Sittard (assistant)
- 2022–: Cambuur (assistant)
- * Club domestic league appearances and goals

Rob Alflen (born 7 May 1968) is a Dutch football manager and former player who is the assistant manager of Eredivisie club SC Cambuur.

== Playing career ==
Alflen was born in Utrecht. He played for FC Utrecht, Ajax Amsterdam, Vitesse Arnhem, Sparta Rotterdam, and Cambuur Leeuwarden in the Eredivisie.

== Managerial career ==
Since 2004, Alflen has been co-presenter of the TV program Namen & Rugnummer on RTV Utrecht. Alflen started his coaching career as a youth coach of FC De Bilt, and later became manager of the first team for the 2006–07 season. In the following season, he became assistant manager of HFC Haarlem but still remained as manager of De Bilt. From 2008 until 2010, he was manager of FC Breukelen. In February 2009, he also took a job at Jong FC Utrecht as manager of the team alongside his manager job at Breukelen.

When Erwin Koeman quit as head coach of FC Utrecht in October 2011, Alflen was assigned as assistant coach of Jan Wouters for the first team of FC Utrecht. He became head coach after Wouters left the club in June 2014. On 25 March 2015 FC Utrecht said that coach Alflen and his advisor Co Adriaanse would step down from their roles with the Dutch club at the end of the season. On 11 January 2016 he became an assistant at Heracles after Hendrie Krüzen left the club. On 16 April 2018, it was announced that Alflen would take over as the head coach of Helmond Sport on a two-year contract starting next season. On 8 May 2019, Helmond announced, that they had sacked Alflen after a disappointing season, the worst season in the club's history with only four victories in 38 games.

== Personal life ==
Alflen's father was the Dutch wrestling champion Loek Alflen.

== Career statistics ==
Appearances and goals by club, season and competition
Club	Season	League		
Club	Season	Division	Apps	Goals
Utrecht	1985–86	Eredivisie	7	0
Utrecht	1986–87	Eredivisie	18	3
Utrecht	1987–88	Eredivisie	28	2
Utrecht	1988–89	Eredivisie	31	4
Utrecht	1989–90	Eredivisie	25	0
Utrecht	1990–91	Eredivisie	33	7
Utrecht	Total		142	16
Ajax	1991–92	Eredivisie	8	3
Ajax	1992–93	Eredivisie	14	1
Ajax	1993–94	Eredivisie	4	1
Ajax	1994–95	Eredivisie	0	0
Ajax	Total		26	5
Vitesse	1995–96	Eredivisie	7	0
Sparta Rotterdam	1996–97	Eredivisie	25	1
SC Heracles / Heracles Almelo (Note: Name changed in 1998)	1997–98	Eerste Divisie	25	2
SC Heracles / Heracles Almelo	1998–99	Eerste Divisie	27	8
SC Heracles / Heracles Almelo	Total		52	10
Cambuur Leeuwarden	1999–2000	Eredivisie	26	0
Career total			278	32
