= Bernard Knitter =

Polish wrestler (born 1938)

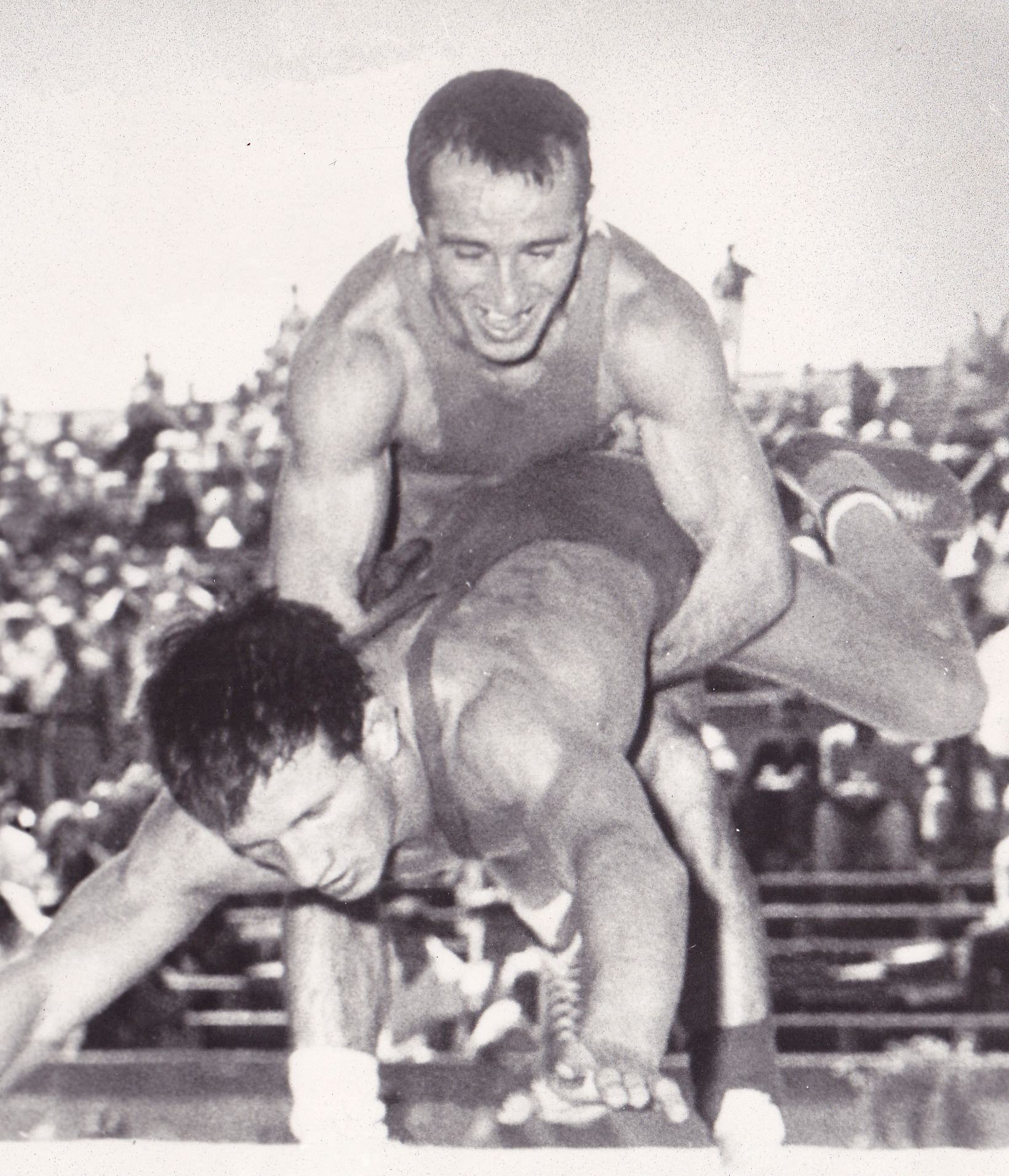
- Gilberto Gramellini (top) vs. Bernard Knitter at the 1960 Olympics

Personal information
- Born: 28 February 1938 (age 88) Osiek, Starogard County, Poland
- Height: 1.64 m (5 ft 5 in)

Sport
- Sport: Greco-Roman wrestling
- Club: Spójnia Gdańsk; Siła Mysłowice; Górnik Wesola; Zagłębie Wałbrzych
Medal record
Representing Poland
World Wrestling Championships
Bronze medal – third place	1965 Tampere, Finland	-57 kg

Bernard Knitter (born 28 February 1938) is a retired Polish wrestler. He competed in the Greco-Roman bantamweight division at the 1960 and 1964 Olympics, and won a bronze medal at the 1965 World Championships.

Knitter holds a degree in mechanical engineer from the Cracow University of Technology. In retirement he worked as a wrestling coach in Poland and later moved to Sweden. He is married and has a son.
