= Kamal El-Sayed Ali =

Egyptian wrestler

Personal information
- Nationality: Egyptian
- Born: 13 May 1935 (age 91) Cairo, Egypt

Sport
- Sport: Wrestling

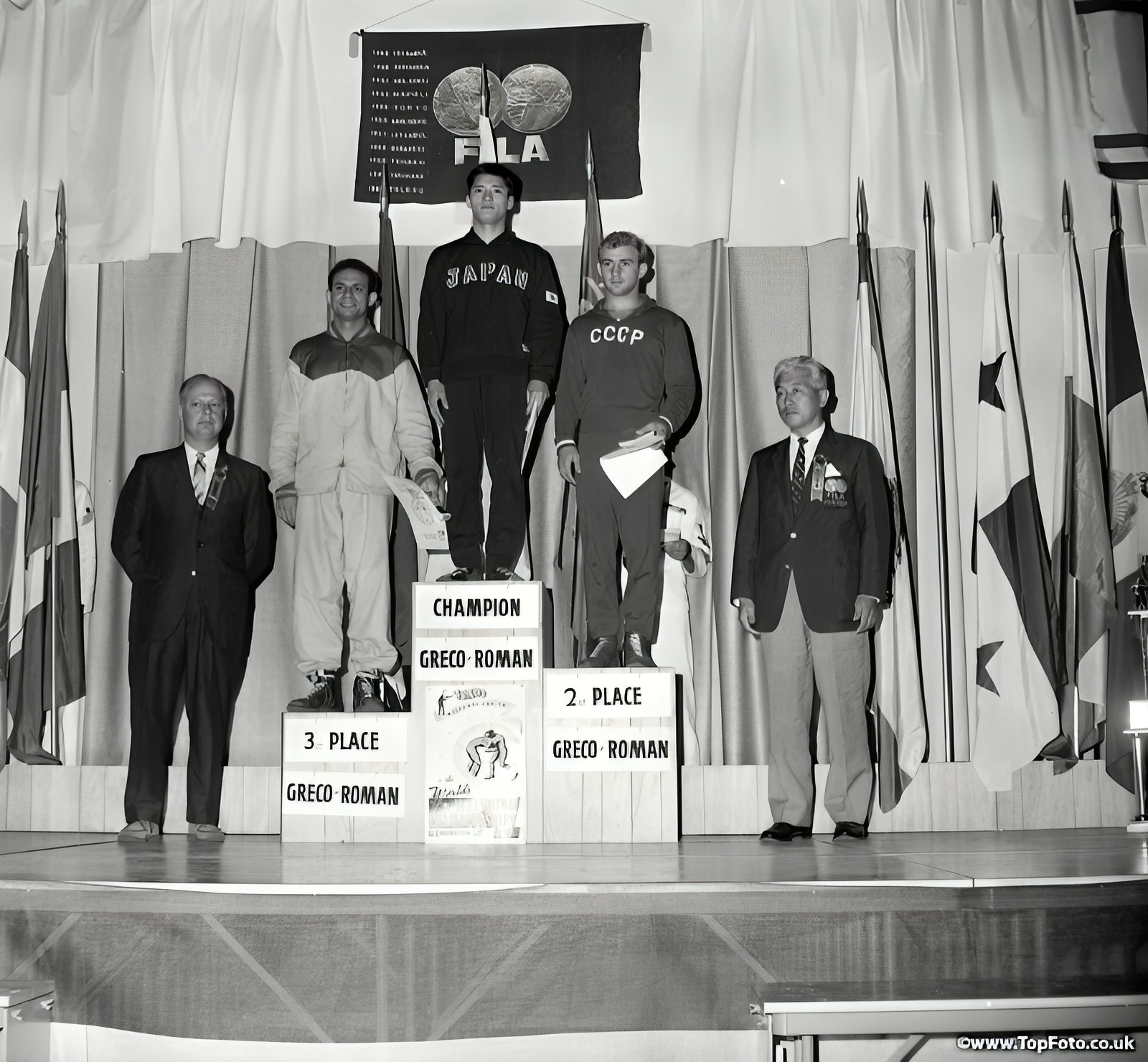
Ali on the podium at the 1962 World Wrestling Championship in Toledo, Ohio.

Kamal El-Sayed Ali (Arabic: كمال السيد علي; born 13 May 1935) is an Egyptian wrestler. He competed at the 1960 Summer Olympics and the 1964 Summer Olympics.
