= List of Penn State Nittany Lions wrestling records and statistics =

The Penn State Nittany Lions wrestling program is an intercollegiate varsity sport at Pennsylvania State University. The wrestling team is a competing member of the Big Ten Conference and the National Collegiate Athletic Association. The list encompasses the major honors won by Penn State, records set by the team, their coaches and their wrestlers.

== Year-by-year ==
Season	Record	Conf. (Points)	Conf. Champs	NCAA (Points)	AAs	NCAA Champs
2025-2026	15-0-0	1st (184.0)	7	1st (181.5)	8	4
2024-2025	15-0-0	1st (181.5)	5	1st (177)	10	2
2023-2024	12-0-0	1st (170.5)	6	1st (172.5)	8	4
2022-2023	16-0-0	1st (147.0)	4	1st (137.5)	8	2
2021-2022	17-0-0	2nd (141.5)	4	1st (131.5)	6	5
2020-2021	6-0-0	2nd (124.0)	2	2nd (113.5)	6	4
2019-2020	12-2-0	4th (107.0)	2	Canceled ()	0	0
2018-2019	14-0-0	1st (157.5)	4	1st (137.5)	7	3
2017-2018	14-0-0	2nd (148.0)	3	1st (141.5)	8	4
2016-2017	14-0-0	2nd (130.0)	2	1st (146.5)	6	5
2015-2016	16-0-0	1st (150.5)	3	1st (123.0)	6	2
2014-2015	11-4-0	5th (96.5)	1	6th (67.5)	5	1
2013-2014	15-1-0	1st (140.5)	2	1st (109.5)	7	2
2012-2013	13-1-0	1st (151.0)	4	1st (123.5)	5	2
2011-2012	13-1-0	1st (149.0)	3	1st (143.0)	6	3
2010-2011	17-1-1	1st (139.0)	5	1st (107.5)	5	1
2009-2010	13-6-1	5th (91.0)	1	9th (49.0)	3	0
2008-2009	8-12-2	7th (79.5)	0	17th (31.0)	2	0
2007-2008	14-5-0	7th (84.5)	1	3rd (75.0)	4	1
2006-2007	14-5-0	4th (90.0)	0	11th (54.0)	3	0
2005-2006	13-4-0	4th (91.0)	1	9th (53.5)	3	0
2004-2005	10-10-0	7th (72.5)	1	23rd (26.0)	2	0
2003-2004	14-5-0	5th (90.0)	1	12th (46.5)	2	0
2002-2003	11-8-0	3rd (111.5)	1	6th (62.0)	4	0
2001-2002	6-12-0	6th (66.5)	0	35th (13.0)	1	0
2000-2001	7-13-0	10th (35.0)	0	25th (15.5)	0	0
1999-2000	6-11-0	8th (47.5)	0	16th (32.0)	2	1
1998-1999	12-5-0	3rd (109.0)	2	4th (78.5)	4	1
1997-1998	18-3-0	2nd (120.5)	1	4th (70.5)	5	0
1996-1997	16-4-0	4th (89.5)	1	10th (40.0)	1	1
1995-1996	11-8-1	2nd (92.0)	2	4th (65.0)	3	1
1994-1995	5-12-0	6th (65.5)	2	5th (60.5)	3	1
1993-1994	15-6-0	3rd (85.8)	3	3rd (57.0)	4	1
1992-1993	22-0-1	2nd (123.5)	3	2nd (87.5)	5	0
1991-1992	18-4-1	1st (165.5)	7	3rd (89.3)	7	1
1990-1991	17-6-1	1st (0.0)	3	3rd (67.5)	6	1
1989-1990	15-8-0	1st (145.5)	3	6th (57.5)	4	0
1988-1989	20-2-1	1st (115.8)	4	10th (39.8)	4	0
1987-1988	14-5-2	1st (117.8)	3	5th (71.5)	4	1
1986-1987	18-1-1	1st (148.3)	5	3rd (97.8)	8	0
1985-1986	14-2-1	1st (95.0)	5	5th (47.3)	2	0
1984-1985	10-6-0	1st (0.0)	3	7th (46.8)	3	0
1983-1984	16-2-0	1st (95.3)	3	3rd (70.5)	7	2
1982-1983	13-2-1	1st (91.0)	4	7th (33.8)	3	0
1981-1982	12-3-0	1st (98.3)	4	14th (20.3)	2	0
1980-1981	11-6-1	3rd (56.8)	3	6th (31.8)	3	0
1979-1980	8-6-0	4th (0.0)	0	52nd (2.8)	0	0
1978-1979	2-11-0	6th (0.0)	0	DNP (0.0)	0	0
1977-1978	13-2-0	1st (0.0)	3	15th (19.3)	2	0
1976-1977	10-1-0	1st (0.0)	4	18th (18.0)	1	0
1975-1976	10-2-0	1st (0.0)	5	10th (23.3)	1	0
1974-1975	7-4-1	NA (0.0)	0	10th (33.0)	2	1
1973-1974	10-0-1	2nd (113.5)	3	7th (43.0)	3	0
1972-1973	11-1-0	1st (117.5)	4	10th (24.5)	2	0
1971-1972	12-0-0	2nd (88.5)	2	8th (26.5)	1	1
1970-1971	10-0-1	1st (89.0)	4	4th (43.0)	3	1
1969-1970	11-0-0	2nd (89.0)	4	19th (12.0)	0	0
1968-1969	6-2-2	3rd (48.0)	1	20th (13.0)	1	0
1967-1968	7-3-0	2nd (72.0)	4	12th (23.0)	2	0
1966-1967	8-0-1	3rd (71.0)	2	22nd (12.0)	0	0
1965-1966	7-2-0	3rd (60.0)	1	23rd (6.0)	0	0
1964-1965	6-4-1	4th (50.0)	1	13th (12.0)	2	0
1963-1964	6-3-1	4th (46.0)	2	8th (19.0)	2	0
1962-1963	5-4-0	5th (28.0)	0	18th (12.0)	1	0
1961-1962	6-3-1	4th (48.0)	0	16th (11.0)	1	0
1960-1961	6-4-0	3rd (54.0)	3	7th (20.0)	2	0
1959-1960	9-0-1	1st (66.0)	1	7th (23.0)	2	0
1958-1959	5-3-0	2nd (51.0)	0	25th (4.0)	0	0
1957-1958	2-4-2	4th (35.0)	1	14th (8.0)	1	0
1956-1957	6-2-1	1st (74.0)	3	5th (33.0)	2	1
1955-1956	7-1-0	2nd (73.0)	3	5th (27.0)	3	0
1954-1955	5-2-0	2nd (50.0)	1	2nd (31.0)	3	2
1953-1954	6-2-0	2nd (25.0)	2	3rd (13.0)	3	0
1952-1953	9-0-0	1st (31.0)	2	1st (21.0)	5	1
1951-1952	9-0-0	1st (33.0)	3	5th (8.0)	2	1
1950-1951	8-0-0	1st (28.0)	2	3rd (15.0)	4	0
1949-1950	7-1-0	3rd (28.0)	2	9th (5.0)	2	0
1948-1949	5-2-0	4th (15.0)	1	12th (2.0)	1	0
1947-1948	2-3-2	7th (5.0)	0	16th (2.0)	0	0
1946-1947	3-4-0	6th (7.0)	1	DNP (0.0)	0	0
1945-1946	2-3-0	4th (14.0)	2	9th (2.0)	1	0
1944-1945	3-2-0	5th (11.0)	1	DNP (0.0)	0	0
1943-1944	3-2-0	6th (6.0)	0	DNP (0.0)	0	0
1942-1943	4-2-1	3rd (15.0)	1	DNP (0.0)	0	0
1941-1942	7-1-0	1st (30.0)	3	3rd (10.0)	3	0
1940-1941	7-1-0	5th (16.0)	1	13th (3.0)	1	0
1939-1940	5-2-1	4th (10.0)	1	DNP (0.0)	0	0
1938-1939	5-2-1	2nd (22.0)	1	8th (5.0)	2	0
1937-1938	4-2-1	4th (11.0)	0	DNP (0.0)	0	0
1936-1937	6-1-0	1st (35.0)	5	DNW (0.0)	0	0
1935-1936	6-1-0	1st (31.0)	3	DNW (0.0)	0	0
1934-1935	6-0-0	2nd (17.0)	2	5th (8.0)	1	1
1933-1934	4-1-1	2nd (20.0)	2	DNW (0.0)	0	0
1932-1933	5-0-0	3rd (18.0)	2	DNW (0.0)	0	0
1931-1932	4-1-1	5th (9.0)	0	DNW (0.0)	0	0
1930-1931	5-1-0	7th (5.0)	0	DNW (0.0)	0	0
1929-1930	5-1-0	5th (12.0)	2	DNP (0.0)	0	0
1928-1929	6-0-0	2nd (20.0)	1	DNP (0.0)	0	0
1927-1928	5-2-0	3rd (13.0)	1	DNW (0.0)	0	0
1926-1927	5-2-0	7th (3.0)	0	DNW (0.0)	0	0
1925-1926	6-1-0	3rd (14.0)	0	DNW (0.0)	0	0
1924-1925	7-0-0	1st (24.0)	4	DNW (0.0)	0	0
1923-1924	5-0-1	1st (22.0)	3	DNW (0.0)	0	0
1922-1923	4-3-0	2nd (16.0)	1	DNW (0.0)	0	0
1921-1922	5-1-0	2nd (12.0)	2	DNW (0.0)	0	0
1920-1921	6-1-0	1st (24.0)	3	DNW (0.0)	0	0
1919-1920	5-1-0	1st (23.0)	3	DNW (0.0)	0	0
1918-1919	2-2-0	1st (23.0)	2	DNW (0.0)	0	0
1917-1918	4-0-0	1st (34.0)	6	DNW (0.0)	0	0
1916-1917	6-0-0	NA (0.0)	0	DNW (0.0)	0	0
1915-1916	5-1-0	NA (0.0)	0	DNW (0.0)	0	0
1914-1915	4-1-0	NA (0.0)	0	DNW (0.0)	0	0
1913-1914	5-0-0	NA (0.0)	0	DNW (0.0)	0	0
1912-1913	5-0-0	NA (0.0)	0	DNW (0.0)	0	0
1911-1912	4-1-0	NA (0.0)	0	DNW (0.0)	0	0
1910-1911	4-0-0	NA (0.0)	0	DNW (0.0)	0	0
1909-1910	1-1-0	NA (0.0)	0	DNW (0.0)	0	0
1908-1909	0-1-0	NA (0.0)	0	DNW (0.0)	0	0
Total	1005-303-37				267	65

Last updated: April 4, 2023
Source: Penn State Athletics

== Honors ==
Team Awards
Competitions	Titles	Seasons
Pre-NCAA National Championships	1	1921
NCAA National Championships	14	1953, 2011, 2012, 2013, 2014, 2016, 2017, 2018, 2019, 2022, 2023, 2024, 2025, 2026
Big Ten Tournament	10	2011, 2012, 2013, 2016, 2017, 2019, 2023, 2024, 2025, 2026
Big Ten Regular Season	12	2011-12, 2013-14, 2015-16, 2016-17, 2017-18, 2018-19, 2020-21, 2021-22, 2022-23, 2023-24, 2024-25, 2025-26
Individual Awards
Honor	Wins	Recipient & Season
Dan Hodge Trophy	8	Kerry McCoy (1997), David Taylor (2012, 2014) Zain Retherford (2017, 2018), Bo Nickal (2019), Aaron Brooks (2024), Mitchell Mesenbrink (2026)
NCAA National Champions	65	Howard Johnston (1935), Joe Lemyre (1952), Hud Samson (1953), Larry Fornicola (1955), Bill Oberly (1955), Jon Johnston (1957), Andy Matter (1971, 1972), John Fritz (1975), Carl Destefanis (1984), Scott Lynch (1984), Jim Martin (1988), Jeff Prescott (1991, 1992), Kerry McCoy (1994, 1997), John Hughes (1995), Sanshiro Abe (1996), Glen Pritzlaff (1999), Jeremy Hunter (2000), Phil Davis (2008), Frank Molinaro (2012), David Taylor (2012, 2014), Ed Ruth (2012, 2013, 2014), Quentin Wright (2011, 2013), Matt Brown (2015), Nico Megaludis (2016), Zain Retherford (2016, 2017, 2018), Jason Nolf (2017, 2018, 2019), Vincenzo Joseph (2017, 2018), Mark Hall (2017), Bo Nickal (2017, 2018, 2019), Anthony Cassar (2019), Roman Bravo-Young (2021, 2022), Max Dean (2022), Nick Lee (2021, 2022), Carter Starocci (2021, 2022, 2023, 2024, 2025), Aaron Brooks (2021, 2022, 2023, 2024), Levi Haines (2024), Greg Kerkvliet (2024), Mitchell Mesenbrink (2025), Luke Lilledahl (2026), Mitchell Mesenbrink (2026), Levi Haines (2026), Josh Barr (2026)

Last updated: March 31, 2023
Source: Penn State Athletics

== National championships ==
=== NCAA team championships ===
In 1921, Penn State defeated Indiana, 32–14, and Iowa Agricultural College, 28–18, in post-season dual meets among conference champions.

In addition, Penn State has won fourteen NCAA Division I Wrestling Championships as a team.

Year	Coach	NCAA Meet Points	Duals Record (W-L-T)
1921	William E. Lewis	Pre-NCAA National Championship	6-1
1953	Charlie Speidel	21	9-0
2011	Cael Sanderson	107.5	17-1-1
2012	Cael Sanderson	143.0	13-1
2013	Cael Sanderson	123.5	13-1
2014	Cael Sanderson	109.5	15-1
2016	Cael Sanderson	123.0	16-0
2017	Cael Sanderson	146.5	14-0
2018	Cael Sanderson	141.5	14-0
2019	Cael Sanderson	137.5	14-0
2022	Cael Sanderson	131.5	17-0
2023	Cael Sanderson	137.5	16-0
2024	Cael Sanderson	172.5	12-0
2025	Cael Sanderson	177.0	15-0
2026	Cael Sanderson	181.5	15-0

=== Individual Championships ===
The program's record for most NCAA Champions in one season was set in 2017 and repeated in 2022, with 5 NCAA Champions crowned. In 2017, Zain Retherford (149 lbs), Jason Nolf (157 lbs), Vincenzo Joseph (165 lbs), Mark Hall (174 lbs), and Bo Nickal (184 lbs) and in 2022, Roman Bravo-Young (133 lbs), Nick Lee (141 lbs), Carter Starocci (174 lbs), Aaron Brooks (184 lbs), and Max Dean (197 lbs).

Year	NCAA Champion	Weight Class
1935	Howard Johnston	165 lbs
1952	Joe Lemyre	167 lbs
1953	Hud Samson	191 lbs
1955	Larry Fornicola	137 lbs
1955	Bill Oberly	Heavyweight
1957	Jon Johnston	130 lbs
1971	Andy Matter	167 lbs
1972	Andy Matter	167 lbs
1975	John Fritz	126 lbs
1984	Carl Destefanis	118 lbs
1984	Scott Lynch	134 lbs
1988	Jim Martin	126 lbs
1991	Jeff Prescott	118 lbs
1992	Jeff Prescott	118 lbs
1994	Kerry McCoy	275 lbs
1995	John Hughes	142 lbs
1996	Sanshiro Abe	126 lbs
1997	Kerry McCoy	275 lbs
1999	Glen Pritzlaff	174 lbs
2000	Jeremy Hunter	125 lbs
2008	Phil Davis	197 lbs
2011	Quentin Wright	184 lbs
2012	Frank Molinaro	149 lbs
2012	David Taylor	165 lbs
2012	Ed Ruth	174 lbs
2013	Ed Ruth	184 lbs
2013	Quentin Wright	197 lbs
2014	David Taylor	165 lbs
2014	Ed Ruth	184 lbs
2015	Matt Brown	174 lbs
2016	Nico Megaludis	125 lbs
2016	Zain Retherford	149 lbs
2017	Zain Retherford	149 lbs
2017	Jason Nolf	157 lbs
2017	Vincenzo Joseph	165 lbs
2017	Mark Hall	174 lbs
2017	Bo Nickal	184 lbs
2018	Zain Retherford	149 lbs
2018	Jason Nolf	157 lbs
2018	Vincenzo Joseph	165 lbs
2018	Bo Nickal	184 lbs
2019	Jason Nolf	157 lbs
2019	Bo Nickal	197 lbs
2019	Anthony Cassar	285 lbs
2021	Roman Bravo-Young	133 lbs
2021	Nick Lee	141 lbs
2021	Carter Starocci	174 lbs
2021	Aaron Brooks	184 lbs
2022	Roman Bravo-Young	133 lbs
2022	Nick Lee	141 lbs
2022	Carter Starocci	174 lbs
2022	Aaron Brooks	184 lbs
2022	Max Dean	197 lbs
2023	Carter Starocci	174 lbs
2023	Aaron Brooks	184 lbs
2024	Levi Haines	157 lbs
2024	Carter Starocci	174 lbs
2024	Aaron Brooks	184 lbs
2024	Greg Kerkvliet	285 lbs
2025	Mitchell Mesenbrink	165 lbs
2025	Carter Starocci	184 lbs
2026	Luke Lilledahl	125 lbs
2026	Mitchell Mesenbrink	165 lbs
2026	Levi Haines	174 lbs
2026	Josh Barr	197 lbs

The following table counts the achievements of Nittany Lion wrestlers by name as opposed to year.

Wrestler	NCAA Championships	NCAA Runners-up	Hodge Trophy
Aaron Brooks	4	0	2024
Carter Starocci	5	0	
Bo Nickal	3	1	2019
Jason Nolf	3	1	
Zain Retherford	3	0	2017 & 2018
Ed Ruth	3	0	
David Taylor	2	2	2012 & 2014
Mitchell Mesenbrink	2	1	2026
Levi Haines	2	1	
Quentin Wright	2	1	
Vincenzo Joseph	2	1	
Andy Matter	2	0	
Jeff Prescott	2	0	
Kerry McCoy	2	0	1997
Nick Lee	2	0	
Roman Bravo-Young	2	1	
Mark Hall	1	2	
Nico Megaludis	1	2	
Frank Molinaro	1	1	
Jeremy Hunter	1	1	
Jim Martin	1	1	
John Hughes	1	1	
Matt Brown	1	1	
Phil Davis	1	1	
Sanshiro Abe	1	1	
Greg Kerkvilet	1	1	
Josh Barr	1	0	
Luke Lilledahl	1	0	
Anthony Cassar	1	0	
Bill Oberly	1	0	
Carl Destefanis	1	0	
Glen Pritzlaff	1	0	
Howard Johnston	1	0	
Hud Samson	1	0	
Joe Lemyre	1	0	
John Fritz	1	0	
Jon Johnston	1	0	
Larry Fornicola	1	0	
Scott Lynch	1	0	
Max Dean	1	0	
Troy Sunderland	0	2	
Aaron Anspach	0	1	
Bubba Jenkins	0	1	
Cary Kolat	0	1	
Clint Musser	0	1	
Dan Mayo	0	1	
Dan Vallimont	0	1	
Greg Elinsky	0	1	
Greg Haladay	0	1	
Josh Moore	0	1	
Morgan McIntosh	0	1	
Pat Cummins	0	1	
TOTALS	65	32	8

=== Head coach history ===
Years	Name
1927–1942, 1947–1964	Charlie Spiedel
1965–1978	Bill Koll
1979–1992	Rich Lorenzo
1993–1998	John Fritz
1999–2009	Troy Sunderland
2010–present	Cael Sanderson

== Olympics and post-graduate careers ==
Penn State wrestlers have gone on to have success beyond their NCAA achievements. Wrestlers have had career success in the Olympics and in professional Mixed Martial Arts (MMA).

Wrestler	Competition	Notable achievements
Katsutoshi Naito	Olympics (1924) for Japan	Bronze Medal (1924)
Ken Chertow	Olympics (1988) for USA	
Sanshiro Abe	Olympics (1996) for Japan	9th place (1996)
Kerry McCoy	Olympics (2000) for USA Olympics (2004) for USA World Championships (2003) for USA	5th place (2000) 7th place (2004) Silver Medal (2003)
Phil Davis	Bellator (2008-)	Light Heavyweight World Champion (2016)
Patrick Cummins	UFC (2010-2019)	
Frank Molinaro	Olympics (2016) for USA	5th place (2016)
Zain Retherford	World Championships (2017, 2019) for USA	
David Taylor	World Championships (2018) for USA Olympics (2020) for USA World Championships (2021) for USA	Gold Medal (2018), UWW Wrestler of the Year (2018) Gold (2020) Silver Medal (2021)
Bo Nickal	U23 World Championships (2019) for USA	Gold Medal (2019)
