= Greg Kerkvliet =

American wrestler

Personal information
- Full name: Daniel Gregory Clifton Kerkvliet Jr.
- Born: February 2001 (age 25) Inver Grove Heights, Minnesota, U.S.

Sport
- Country: United States
- Sport: Wrestling
- Weight class: 125 kg (276 lb)
- Events: Freestyle and Folkstyle
- College team: Nittany Lions
- Club: Lehigh Valley Wrestling RTC; Nittany Lion Wrestling Club (formerly)
- Coached by: Cael Sanderson
Medal record
Men's freestyle wrestling
Representing United States
Yasar Dogu Tournament
Silver medal – second place	2026 Antalya	125 kg
Cadet World Championships
Gold medal – first place	2017 Athens	100 kg
Silver medal – second place	2018 Zagreb	110 kg
Men's collegiate wrestling
Representing the Penn State Nittany Lions
NCAA Division I Championships
Gold medal – first place	2024 Kansas City	285 lb
Silver medal – second place	2023 Tulsa	285 lb
Big Ten Championships
Gold medal – first place	2024 College Park	285 lb
Silver medal – second place	2023 Ann Arbor	285 lb
Bronze medal – third place	2022 Lincoln	285 lb

Daniel Gregory Clifton Kerkvliet Jr. is an American freestyle and folkstyle wrestler who competes internationally at 125 kilograms and collegiately at 285 pounds. In folkstyle, Kerkvliet wrestles for the Penn State Nittany Lions and was the 2024 NCAA champion at 285 pounds. In freestyle, Kerkvliet is a Cadet World Champion at 100 kg.

== Wrestling career ==
=== High School ===
Kerkvliet grew up in Inver Grove Heights, Minnesota and wrestled for Simley High School. In high school, he was a four-time Minnesota state champion and finished with a 218-36 record. Kerkvliet began wrestling in his youth, after his older sister brought home a flyer from her elementary school.

In September 2017, Kerkvliet won the 2017 Cadet World Championships at 100 kg with a victory over Russia's Ismail-Bek Nirov.

In his junior year of high school, Kerkvliet finished 51-1, with his only loss being a 3-2 decision to future Olympic gold medalist Gable Steveson. Kerkvliet initially intended to spend his senior season at the Olympic Training Center in Colorado Springs, Colorado, but changed his mind to return to Simley High for his senior season. In July 2018, Kerkvliet fell to Amir Zare of Iran to take home silver at the 2018 Cadet World Championships.

In September 2018, Kerkvliet suffered an ACL tear, forcing him to withdraw from the Junior World Championships and delaying his senior season. Despite the late start, Kerkvliet went undefeated in the high school season, winning a state title and being named Mr. Minnesota High School Wrestler of the Year. He was named the Junior Schalles Award winner by WIN Magazine as the nation's top high school pinner after recording a fall in 21 out of 22 contested matches.

Kerkvliet was considered the number one recruit in the Class of 2019 by FloWrestling. He committed to Minnesota in October 2016, but decommitted and pledged to Oklahoma State in November 2017. In July 2018, Kerkvliet, reopened his commitment once again, ultimately choosing Ohio State.

=== Ohio State ===
==== 2019–2020 ====
Kerkvliet enrolled at Ohio State ahead of the 2019-2020 season. Prior to the season, he said that he did not intend to redshirt his freshman year. In October 2019, Kerkvliet wrestled for the U23 United States World Team in Budapest, placing fifth. On November 1, 2019, Kerkvliet entered the transfer portal, without ever wrestling a match for Ohio State.

=== Penn State ===
Kerkvliet committed to Penn State on December 5, 2019, joining a Nittany Lion Wrestling Club heavyweight room that already included Olympic gold medalist Kyle Snyder and reigning NCAA champion Anthony Cassar. Kerkvliet took a redshirt season in 2019-2020, compiling an 8-0 record in two open tournaments.

==== 2020–2021 ====
Kerkvliet entered the COVID-19 shortened 2020-2021 season with an injury that was expected to hold him out for the season. On February 22, 2021, he made a surprise debut in the final dual meet of the season versus Maryland, pinning his opponent in the first period. Kerkvliet would go on to finish fourth in the 2021 Big Ten Tournament, with losses to Michigan's Mason Parris and Iowa's Anthony Cassioppi. He placed seventh and earned All-American status at the NCAA Tournament.

==== 2021–2022 ====
Now fully healthy, Kerkvliet was the Nittany Lions starting heavyweight in 2021-2022. He finished the regular season 14-1, with a victory over Parris and a loss to Cassioppi at Carver-Hawkeye Arena. Kerkvliet was named the three seed at the Big Ten Tournament, and defeated Parris in the third-place match following another loss to Cassioppi in the semifinals. At the NCAA Tournament, Kerkvliet claimed his second All-American finish with a fourth place showing. He was defeated by fellow Minnesotan Gable Steveson in the semifinal before clinching a top-four finish with his third victory over Parris in the consolation semifinals.

==== 2022–2023 ====
Kerkvliet returned to an open heavyweight field in 2022-2023 following the retirement of Gable Steveson. He finished the dual meet season 13-1, with a home victory over Anthony Cassioppi and a home loss to Mason Parris. At the Big Ten Tournament, Kerkvliet, a two seed, won a match versus Ohio State's Tate Orndorff and a rematch with Cassioppi before falling to Parris for the second time in 2023 to finish as the Big Ten runner-up. After defeating two seed Wyatt Hendrickson of Air Force in the semifinals of the NCAA Tournament, Kerkvliet lost to Parris for a third time in 2023, resulting in a second place medal and third All-American finish.

==== 2023–2024 ====
Kerkvliet entered the 2023-2024 season as FloWrestling's top ranked NCAA heavyweight wrestler. On November 21, 2023, he defeated number two ranked Hendrickson by technical fall at the NWCA All-Star Classic. He went 12-0 in regular season matches and clinched his first Big Ten title with a 9-3 victory over Nick Feldman of Ohio State at the Big Ten Tournament. At the NCAA Tournament, Kerkvliet survived a tight 1-0 rematch with Feldman in the quarterfinals, defeated Cohlton Schultz of Arizona State in the semifinals, and defeated Michigan's Lucas Davison by major decision in the final to earn his first NCAA title.

== Freestyle record ==
Senior Freestyle Matches
Res.	Record	Opponent	Score	Date	Event	Location
2026 US Open 4th at 125 kg
Loss		(United States) Anthony Cassioppi	FF	April 24–25, 2026	2026 US Open National Championships	(United States) Las Vegas, Nevada
Loss	14–6	(United States) Wyatt Hendrickson	TF 1–11	April 24–25, 2026	2026 US Open National Championships	(United States) Las Vegas, Nevada
Win	14–5	(United States) Jordan Wood	7–0	April 24–25, 2026	2026 US Open National Championships	(United States) Las Vegas, Nevada
Win	13–5	(United States) Ryan Pearl	TF 10–0	April 24–25, 2026	2026 US Open National Championships	(United States) Las Vegas, Nevada
2026 Yaşar Doğu Tournament (silver) at 125 kg
Loss		(United States) Jordan Wood	FF	January 10, 2026	2026 Yaşar Doğu Tournament	Antalya, Turkey
Loss	12-5	(Turkey) Hakan Büyükçıngıl	TF 12-0	January 10, 2026	2026 Yaşar Doğu Tournament	Antalya, Turkey
Win	11-5	(Turkey) İbrahim Çiftçi	TF 10-0	January 10, 2026	2026 Yaşar Doğu Tournament	Antalya, Turkey
Win	10-5	(Turkey) I. Yagan	Fall	January 10, 2026	2026 Yaşar Doğu Tournament	Antalya, Turkey
2024 US Olympic Team Trials 4th at 125 kg
Loss	9-5	(United States) Dom Bradley	2-2	April 19, 2024	2024 US Olympic Team Trials	(United States) State College, Pennsylvania
Win	9-4	(United States) Wyatt Hendrickson	TF 11-0	April 19, 2024	2024 US Olympic Team Trials	(United States) State College, Pennsylvania
Loss	8-4	(United States) Nick Gwiazdowski	1-5	April 19, 2024	2024 US Olympic Team Trials	(United States) State College, Pennsylvania
Win	8-3	(United States) Christian Lance	TF 10-0	April 19, 2024	2024 US Olympic Team Trials	(United States) State College, Pennsylvania
2020 US Olympic Team Trials DNP at 125 kg
Loss	7-3	(United States) Anthony Nelson	1-3	April 2, 2021	2020 US Olympic Team Trials	(United States) Fort Worth, Texas
Loss	7-2	(United States) Gable Steveson	TF 0-11	April 2, 2021	2020 US Olympic Team Trials	(United States) Fort Worth, Texas
Win	7-1	(United States) Mason Parris	4-4	April 2, 2021	2020 US Olympic Team Trials	(United States) Fort Worth, Texas
Win	6-1	(United States) Demetrius Thomas	TF 10-0	October 20, 2020	2020 NLWC II – 125 kg	(United States) State College, Pennsylvania
Win	5-1	(Egypt) Youssif Hemida	TF 10-0	September 19, 2020	2020 NLWC I – 125 kg	(United States) State College, Pennsylvania
2019 US Senior Nationals (bronze) at 125 kg
Win	4-1	(United States) Nick Nevills	3-0	December 20, 2019	2019 US Senior Nationals	(United States) Fort Worth, Texas
Win	3-1	(United States) Garrett Ryan	TF 10-0	December 20, 2019	2019 US Senior Nationals	(United States) Fort Worth, Texas
Loss	2-1	(United States) Anthony Nelson	2-3	December 20, 2019	2019 US Senior Nationals	(United States) Fort Worth, Texas
Win	2-0	(United States) Nick Nevills	Fall	December 20, 2019	2019 US Senior Nationals	(United States) Fort Worth, Texas
Win	1-0	(United States) Mauro Correnti	TF 10-0	December 20, 2019	2019 US Senior Nationals	(United States) Fort Worth, Texas

== Submission grappling career ==
Kerkvliet was invited to compete in the over 80 kg division of the Craig Jones Invitational on August 17–18, 2024. He lost to Fellipe Andrew by decision in the opening round.

== Personal life ==
Kerkvliet has expressed interest in other combat sports, and has spent offseasons training in MMA, boxing, and Brazilian jiu-jitsu. Upon leaving Penn State, Kerkvliet hopes to become a professional MMA fighter. On January 26, 2023, Kerkvliet was announced as a member of WWE's Next in Line NIL program. His father, Greg, also wrestled at Simley High School. Kerkvliet is a Christian.
