= Wrestling at the 2023 Pan American Games – Men's freestyle 125 kg =

Men's Freestyle 125 kg at the 2023 Pan American Games
- Venue: Olympic Training Center in Ñuñoa
- Dates: November 2
- Competitors: 8 from 8 nations

Medalists
Gold medal	Mason Parris	United States
Silver medal	José Daniel Díaz	Venezuela
Bronze medal	Aaron Johnson	Jamaica
Bronze medal	Catriel Muriel	Argentina

The Men's Freestyle 125 kg competition of the Wrestling events at the 2023 Pan American Games in Ñuñoa was held on November 2.

== Qualification ==
The winner of each weight category at the 2021 Junior Pan American Games in Cali, Colombia qualified directly, along with the top four at the 2022 Pan American Wrestling Championships and 2023 Pan American Wrestling Championships. The host country (Chile) is guaranteed a spot in each event, but its athletes must compete in both the 2022 and 2023 Pan American Championship. If Chile does not qualify at any of the first two events, it will take the fourth spot available at the 2023 Pan American Championships. A further six wildcards (four men and two women) will be awarded to nations without any qualified athlete but took part in the qualification tournaments.

== Schedule ==
All times are local (UTC−3)

Date	Time	Event
Wednesday, 1 November 2023	10:00	Round of 16
Wednesday, 1 November 2023	10:00	Quarterfinals
Wednesday, 1 November 2023	11:00	Semifinals
Wednesday, 1 November 2023	17:00	Finals

== Results ==
Legend

- F — Won by fall

=== Final ===
Quarterfinals		Semifinals		Finals
Mason Parris (USA)	12
Elison Adames (DOM)	0	Mason Parris (USA)	10
~~Diego Almendras (CHI)~~		Aaron Johnson (JAM)	0
Aaron Johnson (JAM)	WO			Mason Parris (USA)	2
Ibrain Torres (CUB)	1			José Daniel Díaz (VEN)	0
Catriel Muriel (ARG)	4^{F}	Catriel Muriel (ARG)	0
José Daniel Díaz (VEN)	3	José Daniel Díaz (VEN)	3
Jonovan Smith (PUR)	0

=== Repechage ===
Bronze medal match
Elison Adames (DOM)	1
Aaron Johnson (JAM)	5
Jonovan Smith (PUR)	6
Catriel Muriel (ARG)	7

== Final standing ==
Rank	Athlete
1st place, gold medalist(s)	Mason Parris (USA)
2nd place, silver medalist(s)	José Daniel Díaz (VEN)
3rd place, bronze medalist(s)	Aaron Johnson (JAM)
3rd place, bronze medalist(s)	Catriel Muriel (ARG)
5	Elison Adames (DOM)
5	Jonovan Smith (PUR)
7	Ibrain Torres (CUB)
—	Diego Almendras (CHI)
