= 2023 World Wrestling Championships – Men's freestyle 125 kg =

World Wrestling competitions

Men's freestyle 125 kg at the 2023 World Championships
- Venue: Štark Arena
- Dates: 16–17 September 2023
- Competitors: 33 from 30 nations

Medalists
gold medal	Amir Hossein Zare	Iran
silver medal	Geno Petriashvili	Georgia
bronze medal	Taha Akgül	Turkey
bronze medal	Mason Parris	United States

The men's freestyle 125 kilograms is a competition featured at the 2023 World Wrestling Championships, and was held in Belgrade, Serbia on 16 and 17 September 2023.

This freestyle wrestling competition consists of a single-elimination tournament, with a repechage used to determine the winner of two bronze medals. The two finalists face off for gold and silver medals. Each wrestler who loses to one of the two finalists moves into the repechage, culminating in a pair of bronze medal matches featuring the semifinal losers each facing the remaining repechage opponent from their half of the bracket.

== Results ==
Legend

- F — Won by fall
- WO — Won by walkover

=== Finals ===
Semifinals		Final
Taha Akgül (TUR)	0
Amir Hossein Zare (IRI)	4	Amir Hossein Zare (IRI)	11
Mason Parris (USA)	6	Geno Petriashvili (GEO)	0
Geno Petriashvili (GEO)	8

=== Top half ===
==== Section 1 ====
Round of 64
Paris Karepi (ALB)	1
Aiaal Lazarev (KGZ)	11

Round of 32
Taha Akgül (TUR)	11
Eduardo García (MEX)	0
Islam Adizov (BUL)	0
Giorgi Meshvildishvili (AZE)	10
Aiaal Lazarev (KGZ)	6
Johannes Ludescher (AUT)	1
Kim Dong-hwan (KOR)	3
Oleksandr Khotsianivskyi (UKR)	10^{F}

Round of 16
Taha Akgül (TUR)	2
Giorgi Meshvildishvili (AZE)	0
Aiaal Lazarev (KGZ)	3
Oleksandr Khotsianivskyi (UKR)	8

Quarterfinals
Taha Akgül (TUR)	3
Oleksandr Khotsianivskyi (UKR)	0

==== Section 2 ====
Round of 64

Round of 32
Amir Hossein Zare (IRI)	7
Dzianis Khramiankou (AIN)	2
Jonovan Smith (PUR)	4
Aaron Johnson (JAM)	1
~~José Daniel Díaz (VEN)~~
Sardorbek Kholmatov (UZB)	WO
Zyýamuhammet Saparow (TKM)	0
Dániel Ligeti (HUN)	5

Round of 16
Amir Hossein Zare (IRI)	10
Jonovan Smith (PUR)	0
Sardorbek Kholmatov (UZB)	0
Dániel Ligeti (HUN)	11

Quarterfinals
Amir Hossein Zare (IRI)	11
Dániel Ligeti (HUN)	4

=== Bottom half ===
==== Section 3 ====
Round of 64

Round of 32
Mönkhtöriin Lkhagvagerel (MGL)	1
Deng Zhiwei (CHN)	2
José Cuba (ESP)	0
Diaaeldin Kamal (EGY)	8
Abraham Conyedo (ITA)	8
Gennadij Cudinovic (GER)	1
Mason Parris (USA)	11
Yusup Batirmurzaev (KAZ)	0

Round of 16
Deng Zhiwei (CHN)	2
Diaaeldin Kamal (EGY)	1
Abraham Conyedo (ITA)	0
Mason Parris (USA)	3

Quarterfinals
Deng Zhiwei (CHN)	4
Mason Parris (USA)	8

==== Section 4 ====
Round of 64

Round of 32
Robert Baran (POL)	11^{F}
Joel Tukai (KEN)	0
Sumit Malik (UWW)	3
Taiki Yamamoto (JPN)	1
Abdulla Kurbanov (AIN)	11
Catriel Muriel (ARG)	0
Sou Bali (CAM)	3
Geno Petriashvili (GEO)	9

Round of 16
Robert Baran (POL)	3
Sumit Malik (UWW)	0
Abdulla Kurbanov (AIN)	5
Geno Petriashvili (GEO)	6

Quarterfinals
Robert Baran (POL)	1
Geno Petriashvili (GEO)	3

=== Repechage ===
Repechage round 2
Dzianis Khramiankou (AIN)	10
Jonovan Smith (PUR)	0
Sou Bali (CAM)	1
Abdulla Kurbanov (AIN)	11

Repechage round 3
Dzianis Khramiankou (AIN)	3
Dániel Ligeti (HUN)	7
Abdulla Kurbanov (AIN)	6
Robert Baran (POL)	1

Bronze medals
Dániel Ligeti (HUN)	0
Taha Akgül (TUR)	5
Abdulla Kurbanov (AIN)	2
Mason Parris (USA)	12

Olympic wrestle-off
Dániel Ligeti (HUN)	3
Abdulla Kurbanov (AIN)	8

== Final standing ==
Rank	Athlete
1st place, gold medalist(s)	Amir Hossein Zare (IRI)
2nd place, silver medalist(s)	Geno Petriashvili (GEO)
3rd place, bronze medalist(s)	Taha Akgül (TUR)
3rd place, bronze medalist(s)	Mason Parris (USA)
5	Abdulla Kurbanov (AIN)
5	Dániel Ligeti (HUN)
7	Robert Baran (POL)
8	Oleksandr Khotsianivskyi (UKR)
9	Aiaal Lazarev (KGZ)
10	Deng Zhiwei (CHN)
11	Dzianis Khramiankou (AIN)
12	Sardorbek Kholmatov (UZB)
13	Giorgi Meshvildishvili (AZE)
14	Diaaeldin Kamal (EGY)
15	Abraham Conyedo (ITA)
16	Jonovan Smith (PUR)
17	Sumit Malik (UWW)
18	Sou Bali (CAM)
19	Mönkhtöriin Lkhagvagerel (MGL)
20	Taiki Yamamoto (JPN)
21	Aaron Johnson (JAM)
22	Johannes Ludescher (AUT)
23	Gennadij Cudinovic (GER)
24	Paris Karepi (ALB)
25	Kim Dong-hwan (KOR)
26	Zyýamuhammet Saparow (TKM)
27	José Cuba (ESP)
28	Islam Adizov (BUL)
29	Yusup Batirmurzaev (KAZ)
30	Eduardo García (MEX)
31	Joel Tukai (KEN)
32	Catriel Muriel (ARG)
—	José Daniel Díaz (VEN)

Qualified for the 2024 Summer Olympics
