= Utah Valley Wolverines wrestling =

Collegiate athletic team

- University: Utah Valley University
- Head coach: Adam Hall (2nd season)
- Conference: Big 12
- Location: Orem, UT
- Arena: UCCU Center (capacity: 8,500)
- Nickname: Wolverines
- Colors: Green and white

The Utah Valley wrestling team represents Utah Valley University in Orem, Utah. The team is coached by 1st year head coach Adam Hall. The team competes in the Big 12 Conference, as the school's primary conference (the Big West Conference) does not sponsor wrestling.

== History ==
Utah Valley University's wrestling team remained a member of the Western Wrestling Conference (WWC) through the 2014–15 school year. The WWC then disbanded when all of its members accepted an offer of single-sport membership in the Big 12 Conference. UVU was led by Coach Greg Williams for 18 seasons before his retirement in 2024. UVU announced the hire of New Head Coach Adam Hall, who was previously the Associate Head Coach at NC State. Hall competed for Boise State University, where he was an All-American.

== All-Americans ==
Utah Valley has had 6 All-Americans in the history of the program.

| Year | Player | Weight (lb.) | Place |
|---|---|---|---|
| 2011 | Ben Kjar | 125 | 4th |
| 2016 | Jade Rauser | 133 | 8th |
| 2020 | Tate Orndorff | 285 | |
| 2021 | Taylor LaMont | 125 | 5th |
| 2021 | Demetrius Romero | 174 | 6th |
| 2025 | Terrell Barraclough | 165 | 5th |

== Seasons ==
| Season | Coach | Overall | | Conference | | Conference Finish | NCAA Finish |
| Season | Coach | W | L | W | L | Conference Finish | NCAA Finish |
|---|---|---|---|---|---|---|---|
Big 12 Conference (2015–present)
| 2015–16 | Greg Williams | 4 | 10 | 0 | 4 | 10th | 58th |
| 2016–17 | Greg Williams | 5 | 6 | 2 | 3 | 9th | 60th |
| 2017–18 | Greg Williams | 8 | 6 | 4 | 4 | 5th | 43rd |
| 2018–19 | Greg Williams | 10 | 14 | 1 | 8 | 11th | 38th |
| 2019–20 | Greg Williams | 3 | 11 | 2 | 7 | 11th | Canceled |
| 2020–21 | Greg Williams | 2 | 4 | 0 | 3 | 10th | 21st |
| 2021–22 | Greg Williams | 5 | 6 | 0 | 5 | 12th | 47th |
| 2022–23 | Greg Williams | 2 | 7 | 1 | 7 | 13th | 53rd |
| 2023–24 | Greg Williams | 2 | 7 | 1 | 7 | 13th | 63rd |
| 2024–25 | Adam Hall | 7 | 9 | 3 | 6 | 13th | 46th |
| 2025–26 | Adam Hall | 5 | 8 | 3 | 4 | 13th | 51st |
| Total | | 53 | 89 | 17 | 58 | | |
