= Mason Parris =

American wrestler (born 1999)

Personal information
- Full name: Mason Mark Parris
- Born: October 1, 1999 (age 27) Lawrenceburg, Indiana, U.S.
- Height: 6 ft 2 in (188 cm)
- Weight: 125 kg (276 lb)

Sport
- Country: United States
- Sport: Wrestling
- Events: Freestyle and Folkstyle
- College team: Michigan
- Club: Cliff Keen Wrestling Club; Titan Mercury Wrestling Club
- Coached by: Sean Bormet
Medal record
Men's freestyle wrestling
Representing the United States
World Championships
Bronze medal – third place	2023 Belgrade	125 kg
Pan American Championships
Gold medal – first place	2024 Acapulco	125 kg
Pan American Games
Gold medal – first place	2023 Santiago	125 kg
Grand Prix
Gold medal – first place	2023 Budapest	125 kg
Gold medal – first place	2024 Budapest	125 kg
Gold medal – first place	2025 Varna	125 kg
Gold medal – first place	2025 New York	125 kg
Gold medal – first place	2026 Nice	125 kg
Silver medal – second place	2025 Zagreb	125 kg
Silver medal – second place	2026 Tirana	125 kg
Bronze medal – third place	2024 Zagreb	125 kg
U20 World Championships
Gold medal – first place	2019 Tallinn	125 kg
Men's collegiate wrestling
Representing the Michigan Wolverines
NCAA Division I Championships
Gold medal – first place	2023 Tulsa	285 lb
Silver medal – second place	2021 St. Louis	285 lb
Big Ten Championships
Gold medal – first place	2023 Ann Arbor	285 lb
Silver medal – second place	2020 Piscataway	285 lb
Silver medal – second place	2021 State College	285 lb

Mason Mark Parris (/ˈpærɪs/ PARR-iss; born October 1, 1999) is an American freestyle and folkstyle wrestler who competes at 125 kilograms. Parris is a 2019 U20 World champion, and a 2023 Pan American Games gold medalist. He represented the United States at the 2024 Summer Olympics.

In folkstyle, he was the 2023 NCAA Division I national champion and Big Ten Conference champion at 285 pounds for the Michigan Wolverines, and the Dan Hodge Trophy winner.

He currently competes in the Heavyweight division of Real American Freestyle (RAF), and defeated Alexander Romanov in the main event of RAF 02.

== High school career ==
Parris attended Lawrenceburg High School in Lawrenceburg, Indiana, where he was a three-sport athlete, participating in wrestling, football, and track and field. In wrestling, he won three Indiana state titles at 220 pounds in 2016, 2017, and 2018. He set an Indiana state record with 11 career pins at the state tournament. He finished his career with an overall record of 206–1, including a 152–0 recorded over his final three seasons. He also won the Junior Schalles Award for best high school pinner in 2018.

In football, he was a three-time First Team All-State as a linebacker, and a three-time TriState Football Indiana Defensive Player of the Year. He finished his career with 612 total tackles (302 solo), 17.0 sacks, 61.5 tackles for losses, 10 forced fumbles, five interceptions, and 16 fumble recoveries.

== College career ==
As a freshman at Michigan, Parris compiled a 32–9 record. He led the Wolverines with 32 wins and 13 falls. As a sophomore, he compiled a 28–1 record. He led the team with 28 wins and 11 falls. At the Big Ten tournament, he finished as runner-up to Gable Steveson, losing 8–6. He was then scheduled to compete at the NCAA championships as the second-seed, however, the event was cancelled due to the COVID-19 pandemic. After the season ended, he was named a first team NCAA Division I All-American due to his performance through the season.

As a junior he compiled a 12–2 record, after he missed half of the season due to a herniated disc in his neck that he suffered at the U.S. World Team Trials semi-finals in September 2021. At the Big Ten tournament, he finished as runner-up to Steveson. During the 2021 NCAA Division I Wrestling Championships, he faced Steveson in a rematch of the Big Ten championships, and finished as runner-up, losing in the final 8–4. Parris only lost three matches over the last two seasons, all to Steveson. After the season ended, he was again named an All-American. In December 2021, he signed a NIL (Next In Line) deal with the WWE.

As a senior he compiled a 19–6 record. He finished in fourth place at the Big Ten Championships and in fifth place at the 2022 NCAA Division I Wrestling Championships. After the season ended, he was again named an All-American.

As a fifth-year senior he compiled an undefeated 33–0 record, with 21 bonus wins, 11 pins, three technical falls and seven major decisions. He Earned 17 wins over nationally ranked opponents and posted a combined 10–0 record over the 2023 NCAA heavyweights All-Americans. At the 2023 Big Ten Wrestling Championships, he won the heavyweight championship, defeating Greg Kerkvliet 5–3 in overtime of the final. He became the first Michigan wrestler to win a Big Ten heavyweight championship since Airron Richardson in 1998. At the 2023 NCAA Division I Wrestling Championships he posted a perfect 5–0 record at the NCAA Championships as the top-seed, and outscored his opponents 49–6. During the final he again defeated Kerkvliet, 5–1, to win the NCAA heavyweight championship. He became the first Michigan heavyweight champion since Kirk Trost in 1986. Following an outstanding season he was named an All-American and awarded the Dan Hodge Trophy, as the best collegiate wrestler. He was also named the University of Michigan's Athlete of the Year.

== Real American Freestyle ==
Parris competes in the Heavyweight division of Real American Freestyle (RAF). He was originally scheduled to face Kyle Snyder in the main event of RAF 02, however, Snyder had to withdraw due to an injury. On October 25, 2025, he defeated Snyder's replacement, Alexander Romanov by a 10–0 technical fall.

He faced Wyatt Hendrickson for the RAF Heavyweight Championship in the main event at RAF 04 on December 20, 2025, and lost by technical fall 2–13.

== International career ==
During the 2019 World Junior Wrestling Championships, he posted a perfect 4–0 record and defeated his opponents 36–3. During the gold medal match, he pinned future Olympic medalist Amir Hossein Zare in the first-period.

He represented the United States at the 2023 World Wrestling Championships where he won a bronze medal in the men's freestyle 125 kg. He then represented the United States at the 2023 Pan American Games and won a gold medal in the men's 125 kg, defeating two-time Olympian and three-time Pan American Games medalist José Daniel Díaz.

He represented the United States at the 2024 Pan American Wrestling Championships where he won a gold medal in the men's freestyle 125 kg event. He started the tournament with a 10–0 victory over Richard DesChatelets. His semifinal and finals opponents defaulted due to injury, as a result his lone victory was enough for the gold.

By winning the bronze medal at the world championships, Parris earned an automatic berth into the best-of-three 125 kg championship series at the 2024 Olympic trials. During the Olympic trials he won both matches against Hayden Zillmer with 7–0 decisions to qualify for the 2024 Summer Olympics. During the Olympics, he lost to Mönkhtöriin Lkhagvagerel in the round of 16.

== Freestyle record ==
Senior Freestyle Matches
Res.	Record	Opponent	Score	Date	Event	Location
2026 US World Team Trials TBD at 125 kg
		(United States) Wyatt Hendrickson		June 19, 2026	2026 Final X	(United States) Newark, New Jersey
		(United States) Wyatt Hendrickson		June 19, 2026	2026 Final X	(United States) Newark, New Jersey
Win	64–14	(United States) Isaac Trumble	14–12	May 14–15, 2026	2026 US World Team Trials Challenge	(United States) Louisville, Kentucky
Win	63–14	(United States) Greg Kerkvliet	6–3	May 14–15, 2026	2026 US World Team Trials Challenge	(United States) Louisville, Kentucky
Win	62–14	(United States) Anthony Cassioppi	Fall	May 14–15, 2026	2026 US World Team Trials Challenge	(United States) Louisville, Kentucky
2026 US Open (bronze) at 125 kg
Loss		(United States) Jim Mullen	FF	April 25, 2026	2025 US Open	(United States) Las Vegas, Nevada
Loss	61–14	(United States) Coby Merrill	1–8	April 25, 2026	2025 US Open	(United States) Las Vegas, Nevada
Win	61–13	(United States) Jacob Bullock	TF 10–0	April 25, 2026	2025 US Open	(United States) Las Vegas, Nevada
Win	60–13	(United States) Dino Saracco	TF 10–0	April 25, 2026	2025 US Open	(United States) Las Vegas, Nevada
2026 Muhamet Malo Ranking Series (silver) at 125 kg
Loss	59–13	(Russia) Abdulla Kurbanov	5–8	February 25, 2026	2026 Muhamet Malo Tournament	Tirana, Albania
Win	59–12	(United States) Wyatt Hendrickson	TF 14–3	February 25, 2026	2026 Muhamet Malo Tournament	Tirana, Albania
Win	58–12	(Turkey) Hakan Büyükçıngıl	5–2	February 25, 2026	2026 Muhamet Malo Tournament	Tirana, Albania
Win	57–12	(Romania) Omar Sarem	TF 15–5	February 25, 2026	2026 Muhamet Malo Tournament	Tirana, Albania
2026 Henri Deglane Grand Prix (gold) at 125 kg
Win	56–12	(United States) Coby Merrill	4–0	January 10, 2026	2026 Henri Deglane Grand Prix	Nice, France
Win	55–12	(Germany) Emil Thiele	TF 11–0	January 10, 2026	2026 Henri Deglane Grand Prix	Nice, France
Win	54–12	(Puerto Rico) Jonovan Smith	TF 10–0	January 10, 2026	2026 Henri Deglane Grand Prix	Nice, France
Win	53–12	(United States) Coby Merrill	7–2	January 10, 2026	2026 Henri Deglane Grand Prix	Nice, France
Loss	52–12	(United States) Wyatt Hendrickson	TF 2–13	December 20, 2025	RAF 04	(United States) Fishers, Indiana
2025 Bill Farrell Memorial (gold) at 125 kg
Win	52–11	(United States) Coby Merrill	10–1	November 9, 2025	2025 Bill Farrell Memorial	(United States) New York City, New York
Win	51–11	(Canada) Richard Deschante	TF 10–0	November 9, 2025	2025 Bill Farrell Memorial	(United States) New York City, New York
Win	50–11	(Dominican Republic) Elison Garcia	TF 10–0	November 9, 2025	2025 Bill Farrell Memorial	(United States) New York City, New York
Win	49–11	(Moldova) Alexander Romanov	TF 10–0	October 25, 2025	RAF 02	(United States) State College, Pennsylvania
2025 Grand Prix Zagreb Open (silver) at 125 kg
Loss	48–11	(Iran) Amir Reza Masoumi	TF 0–11	February 6, 2025	2025 Grand Prix Zagreb Open	Zagreb, Croatia
Win	48–10	(United States) Hayden Zillmer	4–2	February 6, 2025	2025 Grand Prix Zagreb Open	Zagreb, Croatia
Win	47–10	(United States) Trent Hillger	TF 13–2	February 6, 2025	2025 Grand Prix Zagreb Open	Zagreb, Croatia
2025 Dan Kolov & Nikola Petrov (gold) at 125 kg
Win	46–10	(Bulgaria) Georgi Ivanov	TF 13–2	January 23–26, 2025	2025 Dan Kolov & Nikola Petrov Tournament	Sofia, Bulgaria
Win	45–10	(Ukraine) Yurii Idzinskyi	TF 10–0	January 23–26, 2025	2025 Dan Kolov & Nikola Petrov Tournament	Sofia, Bulgaria
Win	44–10	(Bulgaria) Dian Manev	TF 10–0	January 23–26, 2025	2025 Dan Kolov & Nikola Petrov Tournament	Sofia, Bulgaria
2024 Summer Olympics 10th at 125 kg
Loss	43–10	(Mongolia) Mönkhtöriin Lkhagvagerel	5–10	August 9, 2024	2024 Summer Olympics	Paris, France
2024 Polyák Imre & Varga János Ranking Series (gold) at 125 kg
Win	43–9	(Kazakhstan) Yusup Batirmurzaev	Fall	June 6, 2024	2024 Polyák Imre & Varga János Memorial Tournament	Budapest, Hungary
Win	42–9	(Puerto Rico) Jonovan Smith	TF 10–0	June 6, 2024	2024 Polyák Imre & Varga János Memorial Tournament	Budapest, Hungary
Win	41–9	(Georgia (country)) Givi Matcharashvili	9–2	June 6, 2024	2024 Polyák Imre & Varga János Memorial Tournament	Budapest, Hungary
2024 US Olympic Team Trials (gold) at 125 kg
Win	40–9	(United States) Hayden Zillmer	7–0	April 20, 2024	2024 US Olympic Team Trials	(United States) State College, Pennsylvania
Win	39–9	(United States) Hayden Zillmer	7–0	April 20, 2024	2024 US Olympic Team Trials	(United States) State College, Pennsylvania
2024 Pan American Championships (gold) at 125 kg
Win	38–9	(Puerto Rico) Jonovan Smith	FF	February 24, 2024	2024 Pan American Continental Championships	Acapulco, Mexico
Win	37–9	(Venezuela) José Daniel Díaz	FF	February 24, 2024	2024 Pan American Continental Championships	Acapulco, Mexico
Win	36–9	(Canada) Richard DesChatelets	TF 10–0	February 24, 2024	2024 Pan American Continental Championships	Acapulco, Mexico
2024 Grand Prix Zagreb Open (bronze) at 125 kg
Win	35–9	(Azerbaijan) Giorgi Meshvildishvili	5–2	January 11, 2024	2024 Grand Prix Zagreb Open	Zagreb, Croatia
Loss	34–9	(Iran) Amir Reza Masoumi	6–11	January 11, 2024	2024 Grand Prix Zagreb Open	Zagreb, Croatia
Win	34–8	(Canada) Amar Dhesi	TF 11–0	January 11, 2024	2024 Grand Prix Zagreb Open	Zagreb, Croatia
Win	33–8	(Azerbaijan) Vakhit Galayev	TF 15–4	January 11, 2024	2024 Grand Prix Zagreb Open	Zagreb, Croatia
2023 Pan American Games (gold) at 125 kg
Win	32–8	(Venezuela) José Daniel Díaz	2–0	November 2, 2023	2023 Pan American Games	Santiago, Chile
Win	31–8	(Jamaica) Aaron Johnson	TF 10–0	November 2, 2023	2023 Pan American Games	Santiago, Chile
Win	30–8	(Dominican Republic) Elison Adames	TF 12–0	November 2, 2023	2023 Pan American Games	Santiago, Chile
2023 World Championships (bronze) at 125 kg
Win	29–8	(Russia) Abdulla Kurbanov	TF 12–2	September 16–17, 2023	2023 World Championships	Belgrade, Serbia
Loss	28–8	(Georgia (country)) Geno Petriashvili	6–8	September 16–17, 2023	2023 World Championships	Belgrade, Serbia
Win	28–7	(China) Deng Zhiwei	8–4	September 16–17, 2023	2023 World Championships	Belgrade, Serbia
Win	27–7	(Italy) Abraham Conyedo	3–0	September 16–17, 2023	2023 World Championships	Belgrade, Serbia
Win	26–7	(Kazakhstan) Yusup Batirmurzaev	TF 11–0	September 16–17, 2023	2023 World Championships	Belgrade, Serbia
2023 Polyák Imre & Varga János Memorial (gold) at 125 kg
Win	25–7	(Hungary) Dániel Ligeti	INJ	July 13–16, 2023	2023 Polyák Imre & Varga János Memorial	Budapest, Hungary
Win	24–7	(China) Deng Zhiwei	5–0	July 13–16, 2023	2023 Polyák Imre & Varga János Memorial	Budapest, Hungary
Win	23–7	(Egypt) Youssif Hemida	TF 11–1	July 13–16, 2023	2023 Polyák Imre & Varga János Memorial	Budapest, Hungary
Win	22–7	(Italy) Abraham Conyedo	TF 10–0	July 13–16, 2023	2023 Polyák Imre & Varga János Memorial	Budapest, Hungary
2023 US World Team Trials (silver) at 125 kg
Loss	21–7	(United States) Gable Steveson	0–5	June 9–10, 2023	2023 Final X	(United States) Newark, New Jersey
Loss	21–6	(United States) Gable Steveson	2–6	June 9–10, 2023	2023 Final X	(United States) Newark, New Jersey
Win	21–5	(United States) Nick Gwiazdowski	6–2	May 20–21, 2023	2023 US World Team Trials	(United States) Colorado Springs, Colorado
Win	20–5	(United States) Wyatt Hendrickson	12–11	May 20–21, 2023	2023 US World Team Trials	(United States) Colorado Springs, Colorado
Win	19–5	(United States) Tony Cassioppi	TF 10–0	May 20–21, 2023	2023 US World Team Trials	(United States) Colorado Springs, Colorado
2023 US Open (bronze) at 125 kg
Win	18–5	(United States) Wyatt Hendrickson	TF 20–7	April 27, 2023	2023 US Open National Championships	(United States) Las Vegas, Nevada
Win	17–5	(United States) Demetrius Thomas	Fall	April 27, 2023	2023 US Open National Championships	(United States) Las Vegas, Nevada
Loss	16–5	(United States) Gable Steveson	TF 1–12	April 27, 2023	2023 US Open National Championships	(United States) Las Vegas, Nevada
Win	16–4	(United States) Ty Walz	4–0	April 27, 2023	2023 US Open National Championships	(United States) Las Vegas, Nevada
Win	15–4	(United States) Gary Traub	TF 10–0	April 27, 2023	2023 US Open National Championships	(United States) Las Vegas, Nevada
Win	14–4	(United States) Gabe Jacobs	TF 10–0	April 27, 2023	2023 US Open National Championships	(United States) Las Vegas, Nevada
2021 US World Team Trials (silver) at 125 kg
Loss	13–4	(United States) Nick Gwiazdowski	3–10	September 11–12, 2021	2021 US World Team Trials	(United States) Lincoln, Nebraska
Loss	13–3	(United States) Nick Gwiazdowski	0–6	September 11–12, 2021	2021 US World Team Trials	(United States) Lincoln, Nebraska
Win	13–2	(United States) Dom Bradley	8–4	September 11–12, 2021	2021 US World Team Trials	(United States) Lincoln, Nebraska
Win	12–2	(United States) Austin Schafer	Fall	September 11–12, 2021	2021 US World Team Trials	(United States) Lincoln, Nebraska
2020 US Olympic Team Trials (bronze) at 125 kg
Win	11–2	(United States) Tony Nelson	6–3	April 2–3, 2021	2020 US Olympic Team Trials	(United States) Fort Worth, Texas
Win	10–2	(United States) Dom Bradley	7–4	April 2–3, 2021	2020 US Olympic Team Trials	(United States) Fort Worth, Texas
Win	9–2	(United States) Tanner Hall	TF 10–0	April 2–3, 2021	2020 US Olympic Team Trials	(United States) Fort Worth, Texas
Loss	8–2	(United States) Greg Kerkvliet	4–4	April 2–3, 2021	2020 US Olympic Team Trials	(United States) Fort Worth, Texas
FloWrestling RTC Cup (gold) at 125 kg
Win	8–1	(United States) Jordan Wood	TF 12–1	December 4–5, 2020	FloWrestling RTC Cup	(United States) Austin, Texas
Win	7–1	(United States) Nick Gwiazdowski	10–7	December 4–5, 2020	FloWrestling RTC Cup	(United States) Austin, Texas
Loss	6–1	(United States) Nick Gwiazdowski	TF 8–18	December 4–5, 2020	FloWrestling RTC Cup	(United States) Austin, Texas
Win	6–0	(United States) Tony Nelson	8–2	December 4–5, 2020	FloWrestling RTC Cup	(United States) Austin, Texas
2020 US Nationals (gold) at 125 kg
Win	5–0	(United States) Tanner Hall	8–2	October 9–11, 2020	2020 US National Championships	(United States) Coralville, Iowa
Win	4–0	(United States) Trent Hillger	Fall	October 9–11, 2020	2020 US National Championships	(United States) Coralville, Iowa
Win	3–0	(United States) Jordan Wood	9–6	October 9–11, 2020	2020 US National Championships	(United States) Coralville, Iowa
Win	2–0	(United States) Chris Lance	9–4	October 9–11, 2020	2020 US National Championships	(United States) Coralville, Iowa
Win	1–0	(United States) Josh Heindselman	TF 10–0	October 9–11, 2020	2020 US National Championships	(United States) Coralville, Iowa
