= Parker Keckeisen =

American wrestler (born 1999)

Personal information
- Full name: Parker Keckeisen
- Born: May 30, 2001 (age 25) Glendale, Wisconsin, U.S.
- Weight: 86 kg (190 lb)

Sport
- Country: United States
- Sport: Wrestling
- Events: Freestyle and Folkstyle
- College team: Northern Iowa
- Club: Panther Wrestling Club RTC
- Coached by: Doug Schwab; Ben Askren
Medal record
Men's freestyle wrestling
Representing the United States
Grand Prix
Gold medal – first place	2026 Zagreb	86 kg
Silver medal – second place	2025 New York City	86 kg
Men's collegiate wrestling
Representing the Northern Iowa Panthers
NCAA Division I Championships
Gold medal – first place	2024 Kansas City	184 lb
Silver medal – second place	2023 Tulsa	184 lb
Silver medal – second place	2025 Philadelphia	184 lb
Bronze medal – third place	2021 St. Louis	184 lb
Bronze medal – third place	2022 Detroit	184 lb
Big 12 Championships
Gold medal – first place	2021 Tulsa	184 lb
Gold medal – first place	2022 Tulsa	184 lb
Gold medal – first place	2023 Tulsa	184 lb
Gold medal – first place	2024 Tulsa	184 lb
Gold medal – first place	2025 Tulsa	184 lb

Parker Keckeisen (born May 30, 2001) is an American freestyle and former folkstyle wrestler who competes at 86 kilograms. The 2024 184 lb NCAA champion, Keckeisen was also a five-time All-American, five-time Big 12 champion and three-time NCAA finalist.

== Folkstyle career ==
=== Northern Iowa ===
==== 2020-2021 ====
Keckeisen, making his debut, at the NCAA tournament became the highest placing freshman since 1952 placing third at 184 lbs. Keckeisen, the four seed, defeated Iowa State's Sam Colbray by decision and a major decision over David Key of Navy. Keckeisen defeated Hunter Bolen of Virginia Tech in second sudden victory after each scored a point in the first tiebreakers. He was edged out by top-seeded Aaron Brooks of Penn State, 6–4 in the semi-finals. In the medal rounds, Keckeisen defeated Brit Wilson of Northern Illinois by decision and John Poznanski of Rutgers by decision to secure bronze.

==== 2021-2022 ====
Keckeisen started his second NCAA tournament off 2-0 defeating Wisconsin's Chris Weiler by major decision 13-4 and Maryland's Kyle Cochran 9–3. Keckeisen fell to the back side with a 6–5 loss to Cal Poly's Bernie Truax. In the blood round Keckeisen defeated Nebraska's Taylor Venz 7–5 to secure his second all-American finish. To finish the tournament Keckeisen took out returned Senior Nationals runner up NC State's Trent Hidlay 7–5 in tiebreaker and took revenge on Bernie Truax 6–4 to finish 3rd.

==== 2022-2023 ====
After back to back third-place finishes Keckeisen entered the 2023 NCAA tournament the number one seed at 184 lb after winning his third straight Big 12 Conference tournament title. Keckeisen started the tournament with a 12-3 major decision over West Virginia's Anthony Carman. Keckeisen then rattled off three straight decision wins over Leigh's Tate Samuelson 4–2, Minnesota's Isaiah Salazar 3-2 and Oregon State's Trey Munoz 4–1. In the finals Keckeisen fell to rival Aaron Brooks of Penn State 7-2 finishing as the national runner up. Keckeisen finished the season with a 26–2 record, recording the eighth best single-season win percentage in UNI history (.928).

==== 2023-2024 ====
Keckeisen entered the 2024 national tournament undefeated once again the number one seed after becoming Northern Iowa's first four time Big 12 Tournament champion, defeating Oklahoma State's Dustin Plott 14–5 in the tournament final. Keckeisen kicked off the national tournament with a major decision over Long Island's Anthony D'Alesio 10–0. Keckeisen then recorded back-to-back technical falls over Iowa State's Will Feldkamp 19-4 and Navy's David Key 22–6. In the semi-final Keckeisen defeated familiar foe Trey Munoz of Oregon State by major decision 10–2. In a rematch of the Big 12 Conference finals, Keckeisen took down Oklahoma State's Dustin Plott 14–5 to win his first national title. Keckeisen was UNI's 23rd NCAA Division I national championship (45th overall between Division I and Division II) and first since Drew Foster's 2019 national title. He was also the program's first undefeated national champion since Bill Dotson in 1963. Keckeisen was awarded Big 2024 12 wrestler of the year.

==== 2024-2025 ====
After a record fifth Big 12 conference title, Keckeisen entered the 2025 NCAA tournament undefeated and as the second seed at 184 lb. Keckeisen started his fifth national tournament with a technical fall over Missouri's Colton Hawks 19–4. The next two rounds Keckeisen picked up major decisions over Dylan Fishback of North Carolina State 14-3 and Illinois's Edmond Ruth 13–5. In the semi-finals Keckeisen defeated Minnesota's Max McEnelly in an overtime thriller 4–1 to advance to his third straight 184 lb finals. In a matchup of returning NCAA champions, Keckeisen fell to Penn State's Carter Starocci 4–3. Keckeisen finished his collegiate career a five-time All-American and a five-time Big 12 champion. He holds the UNI record for highest winning percentage all-time (.956) and is third all-time in wins (133–6).

== Freestyle career ==
Keckeisen competed early in his career at the 2019 Olympic Trials qualifier and the 2020 Senior National Championships. Keckeisen finished 2-2 and 1-2 respectively before taking a break from freestyle during his collegiate career. In his first senior level competition since 2020, Keckeisen finished fourth at the 2025 US Open at 84 kg. Keckeisen, the four-seed in the bracket, cruised through his first three matches of the competition, defeating Jason Bynarowicz (Colorado Mesa WC), Daniel Williams (Navy WC) and Rocco Welsh (KD Training Center). Following a semifinal loss to top-seeded Kyle Dake (NLWC), Keckeisen rebounded with a 5-2 decision over former Iowa State wrestler Marcus Coleman (Cyclone RTC). In the third place match Keckeisen dropped to Chance Marsteller (New Jersey RTC) to take fourth place.

== Folkstyle Record ==
Season	Year	School	NCAA	Weight Class	Record	Win
2025–2026	Senior (+)	Northern Iowa University	2nd	184	27-1	96.43%
2024–2025	Senior	Northern Iowa University	1st	184	28-0	100%
2023–2024	Junior	Northern Iowa University	2nd	184	26-2	92.86%
2022–2023	Sophomore	Northern Iowa University	3rd	184	29-2	93.55%
2021–2022	RS Freshman	Northern Iowa University	3rd	184	17-1	94.44%
2020–2021	Redshirt	Northern Iowa University	DNC	184	2-1	66.67%
Career					129-7	94.85%

== Freestyle record ==
Senior Freestyle Matches
Res.	Record	Opponent	Score	Date	Event	Location
Win	20–11	(Greece) Georgios Kougioumtsidis	8–5	May 30, 2026	RAF 09	(United States) Arlington, Texas
2026 US Open (silver) at 86 kg
Loss	19–11	(United States) Kyle Dake	2–8	April 24–25, 2026	2026 US Open National Championships	(United States) Las Vegas, Nevada
Win	19–10	(United States) Rocco Welsh	11–4	April 24–25, 2026	2026 US Open National Championships	(United States) Las Vegas, Nevada
Win	18–10	(United States) Colton Hawks	TF 11–0	April 24–25, 2026	2026 US Open National Championships	(United States) Las Vegas, Nevada
Win	17–10	(United States) Aidan Brenot	TF 13–2	April 24–25, 2026	2026 US Open National Championships	(United States) Las Vegas, Nevada
Loss	16–10	(United States) Kyle Dake	1–7	March 28, 2026	RAF 07	(United States) Tampa, Florida
2026 Grand Prix Zagreb Open (gold) at 86 kg
Win	16–9	(Georgia (country)) Vladimeri Gamkrelidze	4–3	February 4, 2026	2026 Grand Prix Zagreb Open	Zagreb, Croatia
Win	15–9	(Iran) Ali Savadkouhi	9–5	February 4, 2026	2026 Grand Prix Zagreb Open	Zagreb, Croatia
Win	14–9	(Sierra Leone) Gabriel McDuffie	Fall	February 4, 2026	2026 Grand Prix Zagreb Open	Zagreb, Croatia
Win	13–9	(India) Mukul Dahiya	TF 11–0	February 4, 2026	2026 Grand Prix Zagreb Open	Zagreb, Croatia
Win	12–9	(United States) Zahid Valencia	10–2	December 20, 2025	RAF 04	(United States) Fishers, Indiana
2025 Bill Farrell Memorial (silver) at 86 kg
Loss	11–9	(United States) Marcus Coleman	Fall	November 9, 2025	2025 Bill Farrell Memorial International	(United States) New York City, New York
Win	11–8	(Puerto Rico) Shane Jones	TF 11–0	November 9, 2025	2025 Bill Farrell Memorial International	(United States) New York City, New York
Win	10–8	(Canada) Aiden Stevenson	TF 10–0	November 9, 2025	2025 Bill Farrell Memorial International	(United States) New York City, New York
2025 US World Team Trials 4th at 86 kg
Loss	9–8	(United States) Carter Starocci	3–4	June 14, 2025	2025 Final X	(United States) Newark, New Jersey
Win	9–7	(United States) Marcus Coleman	6–2	May 16–17, 2025	2025 US World Team Trials Challenge	(United States) Louisville, Kentucky
Loss	8–7	(United States) Kyle Dake	TF 1–11	May 16–17, 2025	2025 US World Team Trials Challenge	(United States) Louisville, Kentucky
Win	8–6	(United States) Marcus Coleman	5–2	May 16–17, 2025	2025 US World Team Trials Challenge	(United States) Louisville, Kentucky
2025 US Open 4th at 86 kg
Loss	7–6	(United States) Chance Marsteller	2–4	April 25–26, 2025	2025 US Open National Championships	(United States) Las Vegas, Nevada
Win	7–5	(United States) Marcus Coleman	5–2	April 25–26, 2025	2025 US Open National Championships	(United States) Las Vegas, Nevada
Loss	6–5	(United States) Kyle Dake	1–8	April 25–26, 2025	2025 US Open National Championships	(United States) Las Vegas, Nevada
Win	6–4	(United States) Rocco Welsh	4–1	April 25–26, 2025	2025 US Open National Championships	(United States) Las Vegas, Nevada
Win	5–4	(United States) Daniel Williams	TF 11–0	April 25–26, 2025	2025 US Open National Championships	(United States) Las Vegas, Nevada
Win	4–4	(United States) Jason Bynarowicz	Fall	April 25–26, 2025	2025 US Open National Championships	(United States) Las Vegas, Nevada
2020 US Senior Nationals DNP at 86 kg
Loss	3–4	(United States) Mikey Labriola	2–13	October 9, 2020	2020 US Senior National Championships	(United States) Coralville, Iowa
Loss	3–3	(United States) Nate Jackson	TF 0–10	October 9, 2020	2020 US Senior National Championships	(United States) Coralville, Iowa
Win	3–2	(United States) CJ Brucki	12–7	October 9, 2020	2020 US Senior National Championships	(United States) Coralville, Iowa
2019 US Olympic Trials Qualifier DNP at 86 kg
Loss	2–2	(United States) Leonardo Tarantino	7–13	December 20, 2019	2019 US Olympic Team Trials Qualifier	(United States) Fort Worth, Texas
Win	2–1	(United States) Kadeem Samuels	7–0	December 20, 2019	2019 US Olympic Team Trials Qualifier	(United States) Fort Worth, Texas
Win	1–1	(United States) Stacey Davis	7–3	December 20, 2019	2019 US Olympic Team Trials Qualifier	(United States) Fort Worth, Texas
Loss	0–1	(United States) CJ Brucki	TF 2–12	December 20, 2019	2019 US Olympic Team Trials Qualifier	(United States) Fort Worth, Texas
