= Gable Steveson =

American wrestler (born 2000)

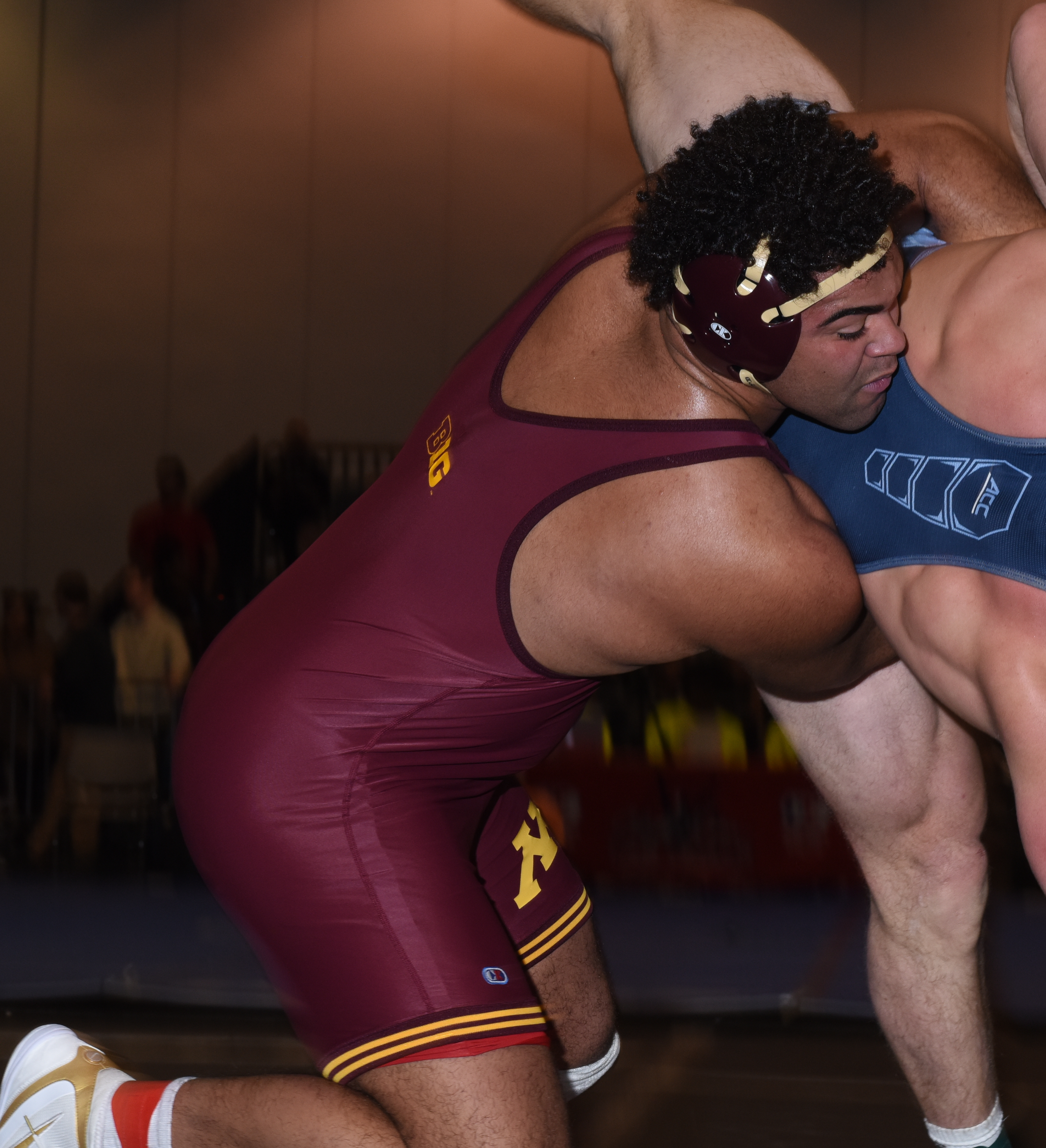
- Steveson (left) wrestling against Cory Daniel of North Carolina in December 2018

Personal information
- Born: May 31, 2000 (age 26) Portage, Indiana, U.S.
- Home town: Apple Valley, Minnesota, U.S.
- Education: University of Minnesota
- Height: 6 ft 1 in (185 cm)
- Weight: 241 lb (109 kg)
- Professional wrestling career
- Billed height: 6 ft 1 in (185 cm)
- Billed weight: 265 lb (120 kg)
- Billed from: Portage, Indiana, U.S.
- Trained by: WWE Performance Center; Ken Anderson
- Debut: July 30, 2023

Sport
- Country: United States
- Sport: Wrestling
- Events: Freestyle and Folkstyle
- College team: Gopher WC
- Club: Minnesota Storm
- Coached by: Brandon Eggum; Dustin Schlatter
- Football career

Profile
- Position: Defensive tackle

Personal information
- Listed height: 6 ft 1 in (1.85 m)
- Listed weight: 265 lb (120 kg)

Career information
- High school: Apple Valley (Minnesota)
- College: Minnesota
- NFL draft: 2024: undrafted

Career history
- Buffalo Bills (2024)*
- * Offseason or practice squad member only
- Martial arts career
- Height: 6 ft 1 in (185 cm)
- Weight: 241 lb (109 kg; 17 st 3 lb)
- Division: Heavyweight
- Reach: 74 in (188 cm)
- Style: Wrestling
- Stance: Orthodox
- Fighting out of: Minneapolis, Minnesota, US
- Team: Jackson Wink MMA Academy
- Trainer: Jon Jones; MMA: Greg Jackson; Boxing: Brandon Gibson; Jiu-jitsu: Gordon Ryan
- Wrestling: NCAA Division I Wrestling

Mixed martial arts record
- Total: 5
- Wins: 4
- By knockout: 4
- Losses: 1
- By knockout: 1

Other information
- Mixed martial arts record from Sherdog

Medal record

Men's freestyle wrestling

Representing the United States

Olympic Games
Gold medal – first place	2020 Tokyo	125 kg

Pan American Championships
Gold medal – first place	2021 Guatemala City	125 kg

Grand Prix
Gold medal – first place	2019 New York	125 kg
Silver medal – second place	2019 Minsk	125 kg

U20 World Championships
Gold medal – first place	2017 Tampere	120 kg

U17 World Championships
Gold medal – first place	2015 Sarajevo	100 kg
Gold medal – first place	2016 Tbilisi	100 kg

Men's collegiate wrestling

Representing the Minnesota Golden Gophers

NCAA Division I Championships
Gold medal – first place	2021 St. Louis	285 lb
Gold medal – first place	2022 Detroit	285 lb
Silver medal – second place	2025 Philadelphia	285 lb
Bronze medal – third place	2019 Pittsburgh	285 lb

Big Ten Championships
Gold medal – first place	2020 Piscataway	285 lb
Gold medal – first place	2021 State College	285 lb
Gold medal – first place	2022 Lincoln	285 lb
Gold medal – first place	2025 Evanston	285 lb
Silver medal – second place	2019 Minneapolis	285 lb

Gable Dan Steveson (born May 31, 2000) is an American freestyle wrestler, professional mixed martial artist, former professional wrestler and football defensive tackle. He is currently signed to the Heavyweight divisions of both Real American Freestyle and Ultimate Fighting Championship.

In freestyle wrestling, Steveson was a 2020 Summer Olympic gold medalist, and was also a three-time age-group world champion. In folkstyle wrestling, Steveson was a two-time Dan Hodge Trophy winner, a two-time NCAA Division I national champion, a four-time Big Ten Conference champion, and five-time All-American out of the University of Minnesota.

Steveson made his professional mixed martial arts (MMA) debut at LFA 217 on September 12, 2025.

He was previously signed to WWE from 2021 to 2024, but was released after a poorly-received televised match. Steveson was signed to the Buffalo Bills in 2024, but was released before the start of the 2024 NFL season.

== Early life ==
Steveson was born in Portage, Indiana to a White father and a Black American mother, where he started wrestling as soon as he could walk, following his two older brothers’ footsteps. His name Gable Dan was given by his mother after legendary wrestler Dan Gable. He has an older brother, Bobby, who performed in WWE as Damon Kemp until his contract expired in July 2024.

After winning multiple youth-level national tournaments, the Steveson family moved to Apple Valley, Minnesota when Gable was in the seventh grade, so he and his brother Bobby could compete for powerhouse Apple Valley High School. At 13 years old, Steveson entered the 2014 MSHSL state finals with a 39–2 record, but ultimately claimed second place, losing the last match of his middle school career in eighth grade.

After that season, Steveson racked up four state titles and a 171 match win-streak, with his last two state tournament championship matches lasting a combined 28 seconds. He holds the highest winning percentage in Minnesota high school wrestling history, at 98.59% (210–3). For his 2017 performance, he received the Junior Schalles Award for best high school pinner. The next year, he was named the Junior Hodge Trophy winner.

In freestyle, Steveson claimed multiple age-group World Championships, winning gold at the 2015 Cadet World Championships, 2016 Cadet World Championships, and the 2017 Junior World Championships. The top-recruit in the country, he chose to remain local and attend the University of Minnesota.

== Collegiate and freestyle wrestling career ==
=== 2018–2019 ===
Steveson, a high school senior, placed fourth at the 2018 US Open Nationals and the US World Team Trials in April and May respectively, beating the likes of NCAA Division I All-American Tanner Hall and fellow Junior World Champion Dom Bradley in the freestyle tournaments. Steveson started his collegiate wrestling freshman season using a redshirt, winning titles at the Daktronics and Bison Open tournaments. Since his redshirt was pulled in November, he compiled an undefeated 14–0 record in dual meets and a Cliff Keen Invitational title during regular season, with multiple wins over high ranked opponents, most notably second-ranked Derek White in his collegiate debut. Entering the B1G championships as the top-seed, he opened up with a technical fall and two decisions to make it to the finals, where he faced second-seeded Anthony Cassar from Penn State. He lost to Cassar by one point, marking his first defeat in folkstyle since eighth grade. At the 2019 NCAA Division I National Championships, he made it to the semifinals, where he was once again defeated by Cassar by the same 4–3 score. He then won two more matches to claim third place and All-American status.

A recently crowned All-American, Steveson returned to freestyle in May 2019 and became a Final X contestant when he ran through the US World Team Trials Challenge, dismantling 2018 Greco-Roman World finalist Adam Coon, two-time NCAA National champion Tony Nelson, two-time All-American Dom Bradley, and two-time All-American Nick Nevills. However, he lost to two-time World Medalist Nick Gwiazdowski twice by criteria and was unable to make the US World Team.

On June 15, 2019, Steveson and a Minnesota teammate were arrested on suspicion of sexual assault and were subsequently suspended from all team activities.

Steveson then made his international senior debut at the Alexander Medved Prizes in August 2019, where he placed second to Khasanboy Rakhimov. In his last freestyle competition of the year, Steveson added a gold medal to his credit from the Bill Farrell Memorial International in November 2019, after outscoring four opponents 32 points to 4, qualifying for the 2020 US Olympic Team Trials.

=== 2019–2020 ===
==== Return ====
After his suspension was pulled and wrestling back to folkstyle, Steveson compiled 12 wins and no losses in duals during regular season, becoming the top-ranked 285-pounder in the United States. Despite being number one in the rankings, Steveson entered the B1G championships as the second seed. At the tournament, he opened up with a fall over the tenth seed, and a decision over the third seed to make it to the finale, where he defeated the top-seeded Mason Parris from Michigan to claim the conference title. Steveson was then scheduled to compete at the NCAA championships as the top-seed, but the event was cancelled due to the COVID-19 pandemic. After the season ended, he was named a first team NCAA Division I All-American due to his performance through the season.

Steveson was slated to compete at the 2020 US Olympic Team Trials in early April 2020. However, the event was postponed for 2021 along with the Summer Olympics due to the COVID-19 pandemic, leaving all the qualifiers unable to compete.

After ten months out of freestyle competition, Steveson wrestled Trent Hillger at the annual Beat The Streets event on September 17, 2020, showing massive skill improvements and winning by technical fall in the first period.

In October 2020, the NCAA granted an extra year of eligibility to winter athletes due to the last season being cut short, this led to Steveson getting an extra year of eligibility.

Steveson represented the Gopher WC at 125 kilograms in the FloWrestling: RTC Cup from December 4 to 5, 2020, alongside graduated Gopher Tony Nelson. After siting out in the dual against the Cliff Keen WC, Steveson faced the heavily accomplished Nick Gwiazdowski from the Wolfpack RTC in an anticipated rematch. He edged the two-time Pan American champion with a score of 4 to 1 points. He then tech'd Jordan Wood to defeat him for the sixth time in freestyle competition and place sixth as a team.

=== 2020–2021 ===
Competing as a junior during the regular season, he compiled an impressive 9–0 record with a 100 percent bonus rate. During the postseason, he continued his dominance, making his third consecutive Big Ten Championship final and winning his second title, dominating the second-ranked wrestler in the country and '19 Junior World Champion Mason Parris en route to a major decision. At the NCAAs, Steveson compiled two bonus points victories en route to the quarterfinals, where he faced '17 Cadet World Champion from Penn State Greg Kerkvliet, whom he was able to shut down but fell short of bonus points. Later, he major'd the fourth seed from Iowa Tony Cassioppi for the second time in the season and advanced to the finals, where he once again shut down Mason Parris to claim the NCAA National Championship. After the season, the dominant Steveson was awarded the prestigious Dan Hodge Trophy as the best college wrestler of the season, along with Spencer Lee from Iowa.

The newly crowned NCAA champion and Dan Hodge Trophy winner, Steveson went back to freestyle and competed at the rescheduled US Olympic Team Trials from April 2 to 3 as the second seed, in an attempt to represent the United States at the 2020 Summer Olympics. Steveson made his way to the best-of-three with dominant technical falls over two-time US Junior World Team Member Tanner Hall and Cadet World Champion Greg Kerkvliet, before facing 2019 Pan American Games Gold medalist and top-seed Nick Gwiazdowski. In the first match, he racked up another technical fall over the two-time World Championship medalist and NCAA champion and in the second match he once again shut him down, this time by points, winning the championship bouts. This result qualified Steveson to represent the United States at the 2020 Summer Olympic Games. He also warmed up at the Pan American Continental Championships on May 30, dominating all five of his opponents and helping the team sweep all ten freestyle medals.

On August 5, Steveson competed at the first date of the men's freestyle 125 kg event, where he outscored his three high-level opponents with a combined perfect score of 23–0 to secure himself a medal and advance to the finals, demolishing '15 Asian Champion Aiaal Lazarev from Kyrgyzstan, defending Olympic champion and multiple-time World Champion Taha Akgül from Turkey and '19 U23 World medalist Mönkhtöriin Lkhagvagerel from Mongolia. After stunning the field on his way to the finale, he faced three-time and reigning World Champion Geno Petriashvili from Georgia. Onto the second period, Steveson was up 4–0 with two takedowns, though the Georgian scored two points of his own to Steveson's one to make it 5–2, before truly turning the tables and scoring a takedown and two gut-wrenches for six points (5–8) with a minute and a half left. With ten seconds left, Steveson scored a takedown to make it 7–8, and still trailing behind by a point, he rallied and got another takedown with half a second left to top the World Champion with a 9–8 score. After a failed challenge by Petriashvili's corner, Steveson earned the 2020 Summer Olympic Games gold medal with a hard-fought 10–8 score over the Georgian. With this new championship, Steveson became the first American super-heavyweight to win freestyle Olympic gold since Bruce Baumgartner in 1992. With his win, Gable Steveson became the youngest freestyle wrestler to win Olympic gold at super heavyweight (125 kg) at the age of 21 years, two months and six days.

As an Olympic medalist, Steveson earned the right to automatically represent the United States at the 2021 World Championships without having to compete domestically to make the US World Team. On August 15, 2021, Steveson notified USA Wrestling that he would reject the bid in order to pursue other ventures.

=== 2021–2023 ===
In September 2021, it was announced that despite Steveson signing with WWE, he would return to college wrestling under an NIL deal. Steveson ran through regular season and swept the B1G Championship not short of bonus points, earning his third and last conference title with a 13–0 record. He was named the Big Ten Athlete of the Year for 2022.

At the 2022 NCAA Division I National Championships, Steveson started off with two technical falls, before defeating Northwestern's Lucas Davison and Penn State's Greg Kerkvliet by decision to cruise to the finals. In the finale, he defeated previously unbeaten in the season Cohlton Schultz from Arizona State University, six points to two. After the win, Steveson gave his last signature backflip in a Minnesota singlet and, in an emotional moment, left his shoes on the center of the mat as a sign of respect for the sport and signaling retirement from amateur wrestling, followed by a standing ovation by the crowd. After the tournament, Steveson was named the most outstanding wrestler.

Steveson went out as one of the greatest and most dominant collegiate wrestlers in the history of the sport, as a Dan Hodge Trophy winner, two-time NCAA Division I National champion and three-time Big Ten Conference champion. He is the first and only heavyweight wrestler to win the Dan Hodge Trophy multiple times. He was also awarded the Big Ten Medal of Honor, which recognizes one male and one female student from the graduating class of each Big Ten member school for demonstrating joint athletic and academic excellence throughout their college career.

Steveson returned to freestyle competition at the 2023 US Open Wrestling Championships, since last wrestling at the Tokyo Olympics. He won the tournament, dominating the competition, going 44–1 against his opponents. He was also named the outstanding wrestler of the tournament. He won the 2023 Final X, earning the right to represent the United States at the 2023 World Wrestling Championships. He later decided not to compete in the competition.

=== 2024–2025 ===
Steveson returned to wrestling for University of Minnesota in 2024. On March 9, 2025, he became the first four-time Big Ten heavyweight champion, winning his fourth title with a win over the unbeaten Greg Kerkvliet of Penn State, who was also defending champion. Steveson was named the most outstanding wrestler of the tournament. He later became the first five-time All-American in University of Minnesota history, despite losing to Oklahoma State heavyweight Wyatt Hendrickson in the national championship match. Steveson finished his career at the university with the highest winning percentage in the history of the school's wrestling program at 97.2% (103–3).

=== 2026–present ===
Steveson signed a multi-match contract with Real American Freestyle (RAF) on March 25, 2026. He defeated Alexander Romanov by technical fall in the main event of RAF 09 on May 30, 2026.

== Professional wrestling career ==
In late 2020, Steveson said pursuing a career in WWE as a professional wrestler in order to become a superstar is "a dream I've had since I was a kid". Prior to the Tokyo Olympics in 2021, Steveson signed a Name, Image and Likeness (NIL) marketing deal with MMA manager Dave Martin. After winning the Olympic gold medal, Steveson teased the public on whether he would continue wrestling or pursue a career in mixed martial arts or professional wrestling next.

Steveson then made a brief appearance at WWE's SummerSlam event on August 21, 2021, and then on September 4, it was announced that Steveson had reportedly signed a contract with WWE. Five days later, WWE confirmed they had signed Steveson to an NIL (Next In Line) deal. Steveson was only the second Olympic gold medalist to be signed by the company after Kurt Angle.

As part of the 2021 WWE Draft, a storyline process in which the company assigns the wrestlers to exclusively appear on a certain show, Steveson was drafted to the Raw brand, which became effective October 22, 2021. He made his first appearance in April 2022 at WrestleMania 38 Night 1, being introduced by Stephanie McMahon and, during the second night of the event, he confronted and performed a suplex on Chad Gable. He later appeared on the December 9, 2022, episode of SmackDown for Kurt Angle's birthday celebration. On the June 20, 2023, NXT special, Gold Rush, Steveson appeared in a backstage segment alongside Eddy Thorpe, giving him advice on how to beat Damon Kemp (Steveson's real life older brother). Following this, Steveson was quietly moved to the NXT brand full-time, where he had his first match at NXT The Great American Bash against Baron Corbin. The match ended in a no contest after Corbin and Steveson threw each other over the announcers' desk. The match and its finish received heavy criticism from fans, who booed Steveson while cheering for Corbin, the heel. In September, Dave Meltzer of the Wrestling Observer Newsletter reported that Steveson was removed from the NXT roster, leaving his future with the company in question. The following month, Senior Vice President of Talent Development Creative Shawn Michaels mentioned that there had been a scheduling issue and Steveson would be back when it worked for both parties.

Steveson made his return on January 5, 2024, defeating Cedric Alexander in a dark match at SmackDown: New Year's Revolution. However, on May 3, Steveson was among several NXT wrestlers and WWE Performance Center trainees who were released from their contract.

== Professional football career ==
On May 31, 2024, it was reported by ESPN's Adam Schefter that Steveson had signed a three-year deal with the Buffalo Bills of the National Football League and would play defensive line despite never playing football before. His first time putting on a pair of cleats was during his workout for the Bills. On August 27, Steveson was released by the Bills.

== Mixed martial arts career ==
=== Early career ===
Steveson made his MMA debut against Braden Peterson at LFA 217 on September 12, 2025. He won the fight via technical knockout in round one.

Steveson faced Kevin Hein on November 24, 2025, at Anthony Pettis' promotion "APFC 21". He won the fight via knockout in round one.

Steveson faced Hugo Lezama on February 19, 2026, at the MFL 3 event of the promotion Mexico Fight League. He beat Lezama via technical knockout in round one.

=== Dirty Boxing ===
Steveson faced Billy Swanson on October 30, 2025, at Mike Perry's promotion "DBX-4". He beat Swanson by knockout in round one.

=== Ultimate Fighting Championship ===
During the main card of UFC 327 on April 11, 2026, it was announced that Steveson had signed to the UFC. On May 16, 2026, it was announced that he would make his debut against Elisha Ellison on July 11, 2026, at UFC 329. Steveson won the fight via knockout in the first round.

Steveson faced Sean Sharaf on September 19, 2026, at UFC 331. Steveson lost the fight via knockout twelve seconds into the first round, suffering his first loss in his mixed martial arts career.

Steveson is scheduled to face Terrance Chatman on January 30, 2027, at UFC 336.

== Submission grappling career ==
Steveson was set to make his submission grappling debut against Craig Jones in a superfight at the Craig Jones Invitational 2 on August 31, 2025. On August 25, 2025, Gable pulled out of CJI2 due to turf toe. Steveson later claimed he withdrew from the event after Jones asked him to throw their superfight, which Jones denied.

== Allegations of sexual assault ==
On June 15, 2019, Steveson and a Minnesota teammate were arrested on suspicion of sexual assault and were subsequently suspended from all team activities. In December, it was determined that they would not face criminal charges due to a lack of adequate evidence. When explaining the decision not to pursue charges, the county attorney also pointed to a lack of a law in Minnesota that, unlike in Wisconsin, would broaden discretion in charging sexual assaults against intoxicated victims. He did not say if a law like in Wisconsin would have actually led to charges in this case.

== Mixed martial arts record ==
Professional record breakdown
5 matches	4 wins	1 loss
By knockout	4	1

Res.	Record	Opponent	Method	Event	Date	Round	Time	Location	Notes
Loss	4–1	Sean Sharaf	KO (punch)	UFC 331	September 19, 2026	1	0:12	Los Angeles, California, United States	
Win	4–0	Elisha Ellison	KO (knees and punches)	UFC 329	July 11, 2026	1	2:31	Las Vegas, Nevada, United States	
Win	3–0	Hugo Lezama	TKO (punches)	Mexico Fight League 3	February 19, 2026	1	3:50	Monterrey, Mexico	
Win	2–0	Kevin Hein	KO (punch)	Anthony Pettis FC 21	November 23, 2025	1	0:24	Albuquerque, New Mexico, United States	
Win	1–0	Braden Peterson	TKO (punches)	LFA 217	September 12, 2025	1	1:38	Prior Lake, Minnesota, United States	Heavyweight debut. Performance of the Night.

== Dirty boxing record ==
Professional record breakdown
1 match	1 win	0 losses
By knockout	1	0

Res.	Record	Opponent	Method	Event	Date	Round	Time	Location	Notes
Win	1–0	Billy Swanson	KO (punches)	Dirty Boxing Championship 4	October 30, 2025	1	0:15	Nashville, Tennessee, United States	Dirty Boxing debut.

== Freestyle record ==
Senior Freestyle Matches
Res.	Record	Opponent	Score	Date	Event	Location
Real American Freestyle at 285 lbs.
Win	42–6	(United States) Anthony Cassioppi	6–0	August 22, 2026	RAF 12	(United States) Columbus, Ohio
Win	41–6	(Moldova) Alexander Romanov	TF 10–0	May 30, 2026	RAF 09	(United States) Arlington, Texas
2023 US World Team Trials (gold) at 125 kg
Win	40–6	(United States) Mason Parris	5–0	June 10, 2023	2023 Final X Newark	(United States) Newark, New Jersey
Win	39–6	(United States) Mason Parris	6–2	June 10, 2023	2023 Final X Newark	(United States) Newark, New Jersey
2023 US Open (gold) at 125 kg
Win	38–6	(United States) Nick Gwiazdowski	TF 10–0	April 27, 2023	2023 US Open National Championships	(United States) New York City, New York
Win	37–6	(United States) Mason Parris	TF 11–1	April 27, 2023	2023 US Open National Championships	(United States) New York City, New York
Win	36–6	(United States) Wyatt Hendrickson	TF 12–0	April 27, 2023	2023 US Open National Championships	(United States) New York City, New York
Win	35–6	(United States) Malcolm Allen	TF 10–0	April 27, 2023	2023 US Open National Championships	(United States) New York City, New York
2020 Summer Olympics (gold) at 125 kg
Win	34–6	(Georgia (country)) Geno Petriashvili	10–8	August 5–6, 2021	2020 Summer Olympics	Tokyo, Japan
Win	33–6	(Mongolia) Mönkhtöriin Lkhagvagerel	5–0	August 5–6, 2021	2020 Summer Olympics	Tokyo, Japan
Win	32–6	(Turkey) Taha Akgül	8–0	August 5–6, 2021	2020 Summer Olympics	Tokyo, Japan
Win	31–6	(Kyrgyzstan) Aiaal Lazarev	TF 10–0	August 5–6, 2021	2020 Summer Olympics	Tokyo, Japan
2021 Pan American Championships (gold) at 125 kg
Win	30–6	(Canada) Aly Barghout	TF 10–0	May 30, 2021	2021 Pan American Continental Championships	Guatemala City, Guatemala
Win	29–6	(Mexico) Eduardo Garcia	TF 10–0	May 30, 2021	2021 Pan American Continental Championships	Guatemala City, Guatemala
Win	28–6	(Canada) Aly Barghout	TF 10–0	May 30, 2021	2021 Pan American Continental Championships	Guatemala City, Guatemala
Win	27–6	(Colombia) Santiago Restrepo	TF 10–0	May 30, 2021	2021 Pan American Continental Championships	Guatemala City, Guatemala
Win	26–6	(Guatemala) Christian Chajón	TF 10–0	May 30, 2021	2021 Pan American Continental Championships	Guatemala City, Guatemala
2020 US Olympic Team Trials (gold) at 125 kg
Win	25–6	(United States) Nick Gwiazdowski	10–4	April 2–3, 2021	2020 US Olympic Team Trials	(United States) Fort Worth, Texas
Win	24–6	(United States) Nick Gwiazdowski	TF 10–0	April 2–3, 2021	2020 US Olympic Team Trials	(United States) Fort Worth, Texas
Win	23–6	(United States) Greg Kerkvliet	TF 11–0	April 2–3, 2021	2020 US Olympic Team Trials	(United States) Fort Worth, Texas
Win	22–6	(United States) Tanner Hall	TF 11–0	April 2–3, 2021	2020 US Olympic Team Trials	(United States) Fort Worth, Texas
FloWrestling RTC Cup 6th at 125 kg
Win	21–6	(United States) Jordan Wood	TF 10–0	December 4–5, 2020	FloWrestling RTC Cup	(United States) Austin, Texas
Win	20–6	(United States) Nick Gwiazdowski	4–1	December 4–5, 2020	FloWrestling RTC Cup	(United States) Austin, Texas
Win	19–6	(United States) Trent Hillger	TF 11–0	September 17, 2020	2020 Beat The Streets	(United States) New York City, New York
2019 Bill Farrell Memorial (gold) at 125 kg
Win	18–6	(United States) Dom Bradley	4–1	November 15–16, 2019	2019 Bill Farrell Memorial International	(United States) New York City, New York
Win	17–6	(United States) Youssif Hemida	7–3	November 15–16, 2019	2019 Bill Farrell Memorial International	(United States) New York City, New York
Win	16–6	(United States) AJ Nevills	TF 10–0	November 15–16, 2019	2019 Bill Farrell Memorial International	(United States) New York City, New York
Win	15–6	(United States) Jeremy Benton	TF 11–0	November 15–16, 2019	2019 Bill Farrell Memorial International	(United States) New York City, New York
2019 Medved International (silver) at 125 kg
Loss	14–6	(Uzbekistan) Khasanboy Rakhimov	TF 0–12	August 9–11, 2019	2019 Alexander Medved Prizes Ranking Series	Minsk, Belarus
Win	14–5	(United States) Jordan Wood	TF 10–0	August 9–11, 2019	2019 Alexander Medved Prizes Ranking Series	Minsk, Belarus
Win	13–5	(Belarus) Aleksander Kosenkov	TF 10–0	August 9–11, 2019	2019 Alexander Medved Prizes Ranking Series	Minsk, Belarus
2019 US World Team Trials (silver) at 125 kg
Loss	12–5	(United States) Nick Gwiazdowski	3–3	June 7–8, 2019	2019 Final X: Rutgers	(United States) New Brunswick, New Jersey
Loss	12–4	(United States) Nick Gwiazdowski	4–4	June 7–8, 2019	2019 Final X: Rutgers	(United States) New Brunswick, New Jersey
Win	12–3	(United States) Adam Coon	8–1	May 17–19, 2019	2019 US World Team Trials Challenge Tournament	(United States) Raleigh, North Carolina
Win	11–3	(United States) Adam Coon	TF 13–3	May 17–19, 2019	2019 US World Team Trials Challenge Tournament	(United States) Raleigh, North Carolina
Win	10–3	(United States) Tony Nelson	5–1	May 17–19, 2019	2019 US World Team Trials Challenge Tournament	(United States) Raleigh, North Carolina
Win	9–3	(United States) Dom Bradley	7–3	May 17–19, 2019	2019 US World Team Trials Challenge Tournament	(United States) Raleigh, North Carolina
Win	8–3	(United States) Nick Nevills	TF 10–0	May 17–19, 2019	2019 US World Team Trials Challenge Tournament	(United States) Raleigh, North Carolina
2018 US World Team Trials 4th at 125 kg
Loss	7–3	(United States) Tony Nelson	4–4	May 18–20, 2018	2018 US World Team Trials Challenge	(United States) Rochester, Minnesota
Win	7–2	(United States) Dom Bradley	5–4	May 18–20, 2018	2018 US World Team Trials Challenge	(United States) Rochester, Minnesota
Win	6–2	(United States) Tanner Hall	TF 15–2	May 18–20, 2018	2018 US World Team Trials Challenge	(United States) Rochester, Minnesota
2018 US Open 4th at 125 kg
Loss	5–2	(United States) Dom Bradley	2–2	April 24–28, 2018	2018 US Open Championships	(United States) Las Vegas, Nevada
Win	5–1	(United States) Tanner Hall	TF 11–0	April 24–28, 2018	2018 US Open Championships	(United States) Las Vegas, Nevada
Win	4–1	(United States) Mike Kosoy	9–0	April 24–28, 2018	2018 US Open Championships	(United States) Las Vegas, Nevada
Win	3–1	(United States) Zachery Roseberry	TF 11–0	April 24–28, 2018	2018 US Open Championships	(United States) Las Vegas, Nevada
Loss	2–1	(United States) Adam Coon	TF 0–11	April 24–28, 2018	2018 US Open Championships	(United States) Las Vegas, Nevada
Win	2–0	(United States) Shawn Streck	TF 14–0	April 24–28, 2018	2018 US Open Championships	(United States) Las Vegas, Nevada
Win	1–0	(United States) Dominic Balmer	TF 10–0	April 24–28, 2018	2018 US Open Championships	(United States) Las Vegas, Nevada

== NCAA record ==
NCAA Division I Matches
Res.	Record	Opponent	Score	Date	Event
Start of 2021–2022 Season (senior year)
End of 2020–2021 Season (junior year)
2021 NCAA Championships (gold) at 285 lbs
Win	67–2	Mason Parris	8–4	March 18–20, 2021	2021 NCAA Division I National Championships
Win	66–2	Tony Cassioppi	MD 16–6	March 18–20, 2021	2021 NCAA Division I National Championships
Win	65–2	Greg Kerkvliet	9–4	March 18–20, 2021	2021 NCAA Division I National Championships
Win	64–2	Wyatt Hendrickson	TF 17–2	March 18–20, 2021	2021 NCAA Division I National Championships
Win	63–2	Taye Ghadiali	Fall	March 18–20, 2021	2021 NCAA Division I National Championships
2021 Big Ten Conference (gold) at 285 lbs
Win	62–2	Mason Parris	MD 12–4	March 6–7, 2021	2021 Big Ten Conference Championships
Win	61–2	Christian Lance	INJ	March 6–7, 2021	2021 Big Ten Conference Championships
Win	60–2	Tate Orndorff	TF 19–4	March 6–7, 2021	2021 Big Ten Conference Championships
Win	59–2	Jack Heyob	TF 16–1	February 21, 2021	Northwestern - Minnesota Dual
Win	58–2	Peter Christensen	Fall	February 12, 2021	Minnesota - Wisconsin Dual
Win	57–2	Luke Luffman	Fall	February 5, 2021	Illinois - Minnesota Dual
Win	56–2	Boone McDermott	TF 17–2	January 31, 2021	Minnesota - Rutgers Dual
Win	55–2	Jamarcus Grant	TF 24–8	January 31, 2021	Minnesota - Purdue Dual
Win	54–2	Tony Cassioppi	MD 14–6	January 22, 2021	Iowa - Minnesota Dual
Win	53–2	Brad Wilton	TF 23–8	January 16, 2021	Minnesota - Michigan State Dual
Win	52–2	Connor Bowes	Fall	January 16, 2021	Maryland - Minnesota Dual
Win	51–2	Christian Lance	TF 23–8	January 8, 2021	Minnesota - Nebraska Dual
Start of 2020–2021 Season (junior year)
End of 2019–2020 Season (sophomore year)
2020 Big Ten Championships (gold) at 285 lbs
Win	50–2	Mason Parris	8–6	March 7–8, 2020	2020 Big Ten Conference Championships
Win	49–2	Tony Cassioppi	9–4	March 7–8, 2020	2020 Big Ten Conference Championships
Win	48–2	Alex Esposito	Fall	March 7–8, 2020	2020 Big Ten Conference Championships
Win	47–2	Christian Lance	MD 19–7	February 21, 2020	Nebraska - Minnesota Dual
Win	46–2	Tony Cassioppi	7–5	February 15, 2020	Minnesota - Iowa Dual
Win	45–2	Seth Nevills	MD 13–5	February 9, 2020	Penn State - Minnesota Dual
Win	44–2	Brandon Streck	Fall	February 2, 2020	Minnesota - Indiana Dual
Win	43–2	Thomas Penola	TF 25–10	January 31, 2020	Minnesota - Purdue Dual
Win	42–2	Gary Traub	MD 13–2	January 26, 2020	Ohio State - Minnesota Dual
Win	41–2	Trent Hillger	10–5	January 10, 2020	Wisconsin - Minnesota Dual
Win	40–2	Brendan Furman	MD 12–3	December 30, 2019	Minnesota - Cornell Dual
Win	39–2	Jonah Niesenbaum	Fall	December 30, 2019	Duke - Minnesota Dual
Win	38–2	Will Hilliard	Fall	December 29, 2019	Old Dominion - Minnesota Dual
Win	37–2	Jordan Wood	MD 8–0	December 29, 2019	Lehigh - Minnesota Dual
Win	36–2	Blake Wolters	MD 21–8	December 20, 2019	Minnesota - South Dakota State Dual
Start of 2019–2020 Season (sophomore year)
End of 2018–2019 Season (freshman year)
2019 NCAA Championships (bronze) at 285 lbs
Win	35–2	Jordan Wood	4–0	March 21–23, 2019	2019 NCAA Division I National Championships
Win	34–2	Youssif Hemida	6–2	March 21–23, 2019	2019 NCAA Division I National Championships
Loss	33–2	Anthony Cassar	3–4	March 21–23, 2019	2019 NCAA Division I National Championships
Win	33–1	Amar Dhesi	MD 11–1	March 21–23, 2019	2019 NCAA Division I National Championships
Win	32–1	Brian Andrews	MD 21–8	March 21–23, 2019	2019 NCAA Division I National Championships
Win	31–1	Zack Parker	TF 18–3	March 21–23, 2019	2019 NCAA Division I National Championships
2019 Big Ten Championships (silver) at 285 lbs
Loss	30–1	Anthony Cassar	3–4	March 9–10, 2019	2019 Big Ten Conference Championships
Win	30–0	Trent Hillger	10–4	March 9–10, 2019	2019 Big Ten Conference Championships
Win	29–0	Sam Stoll	5–3	March 9–10, 2019	2019 Big Ten Conference Championships
Win	28–0	Christian Colucci	TF 21–6	March 9–10, 2019	2019 Big Ten Conference Championships
Win	27–0	Fletcher Miller	TF 20–5	February 17, 2019	Indiana - Minnesota Dual
Win	26–0	Youssif Hemida	7–4	February 10, 2019	Maryland - Minnesota Dual
Win	25–0	David Jensen	MD 13–5	February 8, 2019	Minnesota - Nebraska Dual
Win	24–0	Jacob Aven	MD 16–6	February 3, 2019	Purdue - Minnesota Dual
Win	23–0	Trent Hillger	MD 11–2	January 25, 2019	Minnesota - Wisconsin Dual
Win	22–0	Conan Jennings	9–5	January 20, 2019	Minnesota - Northwestern Dual
Win	21–0	Deuce Rachal	Fall	January 18, 2019	Minnesota - Illinois Dual
Win	20–0	Connor Corbin	MD 12–3	January 13, 2019	Iowa - Minnesota Dual
Win	19–0	Christian Colucci	TF 17–2	January 6, 2019	Rutgers - Minnesota Dual
Win	18–0	FF	FF	December 30, 2018	Utah Valley - Minnesota Dual
Win	17–0	Spencer Berthold	Fall	December 30, 2018	Kent State - Minnesota Dual
Win	16–0	Cory Gillilland-Daniel	Fall	December 29, 2018	Minnesota - North Carolina Dual
Win	15–0	Jordan Wood	9–4	December 29, 2018	Lehigh - Minnesota Dual
Win	14–0	FF	FF	December 8, 2018	Minnesota - Fresno State Dual
2018 Cliff Keen Invitational (gold) at 285 lbs
Win	13–0	Tate Orndorff	MD 12–4	November 30 - December 1, 2018	2018 Cliff Keen Invitational
Win	12–0	Cory Daniel	9–3	November 30 - December 1, 2018	2018 Cliff Keen Invitational
Win	11–0	AJ Nevills	MD 15–6	November 30 - December 1, 2018	2018 Cliff Keen Invitational
Win	10–0	John Borst	TF 18–3	November 30 - December 1, 2018	2018 Cliff Keen Invitational
Win	9–0	Luke Ready	Fall	November 30 - December 1, 2018	2018 Cliff Keen Invitational
Win	8–0	Blake Wolters	TF 18–3	November 25, 2018	South Dakota State - Minnesota Dual
Win	7–0	Derek White	8–2	November 18, 2018	Oklahoma State - Minnesota Dual
2018 Bison Open (gold) at 285 lbs
Win	6–0	Tanner Hall	SV–1 3–1	November 10, 2018	2018 Bison Open
Win	5–0	Daniel Stibral	11–6	November 10, 2018	2018 Bison Open
Win	4–0	Samuel Erckenbrack	TF 20–5	November 10, 2018	2018 Bison Open
2018 Daktronics Open (gold) at 285 lbs
Win	3–0	Rylee Streifel	8–4	November 4, 2018	2018 Daktronics Open
Win	2–0	Christian Lance	12–6	November 4, 2018	2018 Daktronics Open
Win	1–0	Austin Emmerson	MD 15–6	November 4, 2018	2018 Daktronics Open
Start of 2018-2019 Season (freshman year)

=== Stats ===
Season	Year	School	Rank	Record	Weight Class	Bonus Wins
2022	Senior	University of Minnesota	#1 (1st)	17–0	100.00%	82.4%
2021	Junior	University of Minnesota	#1 (1st)	17–0	100.00%	87.5%
2020	Sophomore	University of Minnesota	#1	15–0	100.00%	73.33%
2019	Freshman	University of Minnesota	#3 (3rd)	35–2	94.59%	55.26%
Career				85-2	96.88%	72.03%

== See also ==
- Comparison of professional wrestling and mixed martial arts
- List of gridiron football players who became professional wrestlers
- List of male mixed martial artists
- List of multi-sport athletes
