= Anthony Cassar =

American wrestler and mixed martial artist (born 1996)

Personal information
- Born: March 9, 1996 (age 30) Rocky Hill, New Jersey, U.S.
- Weight: 237 lb (108 kg)
- Martial arts career
- Division: Heavyweight
- Style: Wrestling
- Team: American Top Team (2020–present)
- Wrestling: NCAA Division I Wrestling

Mixed martial arts record
- Total: 2
- Wins: 2
- By submission: 1
- By decision: 1
- Losses: 0

Other information
- Mixed martial arts record from Sherdog

Sport
- Country: United States
- Sport: Wrestling
- Event: Folkstyle
- College team: Penn State
- Club: Nittany Lion Wrestling Club
- Coached by: Cael Sanderson
Medal record
Men's collegiate wrestling
Representing the Penn State Nittany Lions
NCAA Division I Championships
Gold medal – first place	2019 Pittsburgh	285 lb
Big Ten Championships
Gold medal – first place	2019 Minneapolis	285 lb

Anthony Cassar (born March 9, 1996) is an American freestyle wrestler and graduated folkstyle wrestler. He was an NCAA Division I champion and a Big Ten Conference champion at Penn State University, and a NJSIAA title holder as a high schooler.

== Folkstyle career ==
=== High school ===
Raised in Rocky Hill, New Jersey, Cassar started wrestling at around age 7 or 8. He attended Montgomery High School in New Jersey. During his freshman, sophomore and junior years, he never qualified for states and compiled a record of 73–30.

In his senior year, he finally qualified for state and became the fourth person in the history of New Jersey to win the state tournament after never qualifying before. He compiled an undefeated record of 43–0 in his final season and an 116–30 record overall.

=== College ===
After his performance as a high school senior, he committed to Penn State University. He redshirted 2014-15 and compiled a record of 15-8 while wrestling unattached. He originally missed his freshman and sophomore seasons due to an injury but was granted one more year of eligibility by the NCAA, so he only lost his freshman year but would compete as a sophomore in 2017–18. As a sophomore, he compiled a record of 16-2 during the regular season, with a Keystone Classic title and a third-place finish at the Southern Scuffle after being defeated by his teammate Shakur Rasheed. Despite his success, he was left on the bench for the postseason, with Rasheed as the starter.

His next season, he moved up to heavyweight (285 pounds) and saw immediate success, posting a record of 21-1 during regular season with lone loss to Derek White at the Southern Scuffle's finals. In the postseason, he made his way to the first-place finish at the Big Ten Championships with wins over the #6 and #7-ranked wrestlers and top-ranked Gable Steveson at the finale. At the 2019 NCAA championships, he got the victory over multiple ranked wrestlers including Steveson in the semifinals to make his way to the finale. In the finals, he avenged his regular season's loss on a dominant major decision win over Derek White to claim the championship on his first trip to the NCAA championships. In his final season, he had posted a record of three wins and no losses but was affected by a shoulder injury while competing at a freestyle event and subsequently announced his career as a collegiate wrestler was over.

Cassar graduated with a record of 49 wins and three losses during his time as a Nittany Lion.

== Freestyle career ==
As a junior-level freestyle wrestler, Cassar was the 2015 World Team Member at 96 kilograms and represented the USA at that year's World Championships, where he placed eighth.

=== 2019 ===
Cassar made his senior level debut on December 22 at the US nationals, in an attempt to earn a shot at the Olympic Trials. He dominantly won his first two bouts to reach the semifinals, where he was forced to abandon the match due to a shoulder injury and forfeited his next contests too. This injury also ended his senior season at Penn State.

=== 2020 ===
Cassar was scheduled to compete at the Last Chance Olympic Trials qualifier on March 27 at Millersville, Pennsylvania. However, the event was postponed along with the Olympic Games and Trials due to the COVID-19 pandemic.

== Mixed martial arts career ==
On May 30, 2020, it was announced that Cassar had signed an MMA management deal with First Round Management and is expected to make the transition after the 20' (21') Summer Olympics. He has been training at American Top Team in the meantime, training with UFC's welterweight contender Jorge Masvidal and Nittany Lion teammate and three-time NCAA champion Bo Nickal, who is also expected to transition to mixed martial arts and train full-time at ATT after the Olympics. Anthony was set to make his pro MMA debut on November 19, 2022, against Idrees Wasi. Cassar would go on to win the bout via first round arm triangle choke. Anthony was next scheduled to fight John Gianatasio on October 22. 2023, he won the bout via unanimous decision (30–27, 30–27, 30–27).

== Mixed martial arts record ==
Professional record breakdown
2 matches	2 wins	0 losses
By submission	1	0
By decision	1	0

Res.	Record	Opponent	Method	Event	Date	Round	Time	Location	Notes
Win	2–0	John Gianatasio II	Decision (unanimous)	Fury FC - Challenger Series 8	October 22, 2023	3	5:00	Houston, Texas, United States	
Win	1–0	Idrees Wasi	Submission (arm-triangle choke)	iKON FC 6	December 2, 2022	1	3:11	Kissimmee, Florida, United States	

== Freestyle record ==
Senior Freestyle Matches
Res.	Record	Opponent	Score	Date	Event	Location
2019 US Nationals 6th at 125 kg
Win	2-0	(United States) Ceron Francisco	10-2	December 22, 2019	2019 Senior Nationals - US Olympic Trials Qualifier	(United States) Fort Worth, Texas
Win	1-0	(United States) Jeremy Benton	TF 10–0	December 22, 2019	2019 Senior Nationals - US Olympic Trials Qualifier	(United States) Fort Worth, Texas

== NCAA record ==
NCAA Division I Record
Res.	Record	Opponent	Score	Date	Event
End of 2019-2020 Season (senior year)
Win	49-3	Jordan Wood	9-4	December 6, 2019	Penn State - Lehigh Dual
Win	48-3	Tanner Hall	9-5	November 22, 2019	Penn State - Arizona State Dual
Win	47-3	John Birchmeier	Fall	November 10, 2019	Navy - Penn State Dual
Start of 2019-2020 Season (senior year)
End of 2018-2019 Season (junior year)
2019 NCAA championships (gold) at 285 lbs
Win	46-3	Derek White	MD 10–1	March 21, 2019	2019 NCAA Division I Wrestling Championships
Win	45-3	Gable Steveson	4-3	March 21, 2019	2019 NCAA Division I Wrestling Championships
Win	44-3	Trent Hillger	4-0	March 21, 2019	2019 NCAA Division I Wrestling Championships
Win	43-3	Tate Orndorff	MD 10–2	March 21, 2019	2019 NCAA Division I Wrestling Championships
Win	42-3	Antonio Pelusi	Fall	March 21, 2019	2019 NCAA Division I Wrestling Championships
2019 Big Ten Conference (gold) at 285 lbs
Win	41-3	Gable Steveson	4-3	Mar 9, 2019	2019 Big Ten Championships
Win	40-3	Conan Jennings	MD 10–2	Mar 9, 2019	2019 Big Ten Championships
Win	39-3	David Jensen	8-4	Mar 9, 2019	2019 Big Ten Championships
Win	38-3	Jacob Aven	MD 12–4	Mar 9, 2019	2019 Big Ten Championships
Win	37-3	Sam Schuyler	MD 16–5	February 24, 2019	Buffalo - Penn State Dual
Win	36-3	Deuce Rachal	Fall	February 17, 2019	Penn State - Illinois Dual
Win	35-3	Chase Beard	TF 21–6	February 15, 2019	Michigan State - Penn State Dual
Win	34-3	Chase Singletary	MD 18–8	February 8, 2019	Penn State - Ohio State Dual
Win	33-3	Mason Parris	MD 19–8	February 1, 2019	Michigan - Penn State Dual
Win	32-3	Fletcher Miller	11-5	January 27, 2019	Penn State - Indiana Dual
Win	31-3	Jacob Aven	MD 14–4	January 25, 2019	Penn State - Purdue Dual
Win	30-3	David Jensen	10-4	January 20, 2019	Nebraska - Penn State Dual
Win	29-3	Trent Hillger	11-5	January 13, 2019	Wisconsin - Penn State Dual
Win	28-3	Conan Jennings	MD 12–2	January 11, 2019	Penn State - Northwestern Dual
2019 Southern Scuffle (silver) at 285 lbs
Loss	27-3	Derek White	2-3	January 1, 2019	2019 Southern Scuffle
Win	27-2	Matt Voss	MD 14–6	January 1, 2019	2019 Southern Scuffle
Win	26-2	Gannon Gremmel	MD 16–5	January 1, 2019	2019 Southern Scuffle
Win	25-2	Ryan Cloud	MD 16–4	January 1, 2019	2019 Southern Scuffle
Win	24-2	Jordan Earnest	MD 18–4	January 1, 2019	2019 Southern Scuffle
Win	23-2	Brady Gilliland-Daniel	Fall	December 14, 2018	Arizona State - Penn State Dual
Win	22-2	Jordan Wood	MD 12–3	December 2, 2018	Lehigh - Penn State Dual
Win	21-2	Brandon Stokes	Fall	November 30, 2018	Penn State - Bucknell Dual
2018 Keystone Classic (gold) at 285 lbs
Win	20-2	Joseph Goodhart	MD 11–3	November 18, 2018	2018 Keystone Classic
Win	19-2	Nick Nevills	7-2	November 18, 2018	2018 Keystone Classic
Win	18-2	Ben Goldin	Fall	November 18, 2018	2018 Keystone Classic
Win	17-2	Billy Bolia	TF 17–2	November 11, 2018	Kent State - Penn State Dual
Start of 2018-2019 Season (junior year)
End of 2017-2018 Season (sophomore year)
Win	16-2	Kollin Moore	6-3	February 3, 2018	Ohio State - Penn State Dual
Win	15-2	Anthony Messner	MD 16–5	January 28, 2018	Penn State - Rutgers Dual
Win	14-2	David-Brian Whisler	MD 14–5	January 21, 2018	Penn State - Maryland Dual
Win	13-2	Nick May	MD 16–2	January 14, 2018	Penn State - Michigan State Dual
2018 Southern Scuffle (bronze) at 197 lbs
Win	12-2	Stephen Loiseau	4-1	January 1, 2018	2018 Southern Scuffle
Win	11-2	Scottie Boykin	9-7	January 1, 2018	2018 Southern Scuffle
Loss	10-2	Shakur Rasheed	4-6	January 1, 2018	2018 Southern Scuffle
Win	10-1	Stephen Loiseau	4-1	January 1, 2018	2018 Southern Scuffle
Win	9-1	Tristan Sponseller	13-10	January 1, 2018	2018 Southern Scuffle
Win	8-1	Spencer Irick	MD 16–5	December 17, 2017	Indiana - Penn State Dual
Win	7-1	Jake Jakobsen	8-3	December 3, 2017	Penn State - Lehigh Dual
2017 Keystone Classic (gold) at 197 lbs
Win	6-1	Frank Mattiace	7-4	November 18, 2017	2017 Keystone Classic
Win	5-1	Matt McCutcheon	5-6	November 18, 2017	2017 Keystone Classic
Win	4-1	Alec Schenk	12-5	November 18, 2017	2017 Keystone Classic
Win	3-1	Robert Ng	MD 12–4	November 18, 2017	2017 Keystone Classic
Win	2-1	Mark Tracy	10-4	November 17, 2017	Penn State - Binghamton Dual
Loss	1-1	Garrett Hoffman	8-11	November 12, 2017	Bucknell - Penn State Dual
Win	1-0	Rocco Caywood	10-3	November 9, 2017	Army - Penn State Dual
Start of 2017-2018 Season (sophomore year)

=== Stats ===
Season	Year	School	Rank	Weigh Class	Record	Win	Bonus
2020	Senior	Penn State University	#2 (DNQ)	285	3-0	100.00%	33.33%
2019	Junior	Penn State University	#2 (1st)	285	30-1	96.77%	70.97%
2018	Sophomore	Penn State University	#7 (DNQ)	197	16-2	88.89%	27.78%
Career					49-3	94.23%	53.85%

== Collegiate awards & records ==
- Junior
  - (gold) NCAA Division I (285 lbs)
  - (gold) Big Ten Conference (285 lbs)
  - Team's first NCAA heavyweight champion in the century
