= 2021 NCAA Division I Wrestling Championships =

American collegiate wrestling tournament

- Teams: 63
- Format: Knockout
- Finals site: St. Louis; Enterprise Center
- Champions: Iowa Hawkeyes (24th title)
- Runner-up: Penn State Nittany Lions
- Semifinalists: Oklahoma State Cowboys; Arizona State Sun Devils
- Winning coach: Tom Brands (4th title)
- Attendance: 25% capacity
- Television: ESPN Networks

The 2021 NCAA Division I Wrestling Championships took place from March 18–20, 2021, in St. Louis, Missouri at the Enterprise Center. The tournament was the 90th NCAA Division I Wrestling Championship, following the cancellation of the 2020 edition, and featured 63 teams across that level.

Due to the COVID-19 pandemic in the United States, the event was forced to occur with modifications. Fans were permitted at Enterprise Center, however the number of tickets issued was limited to 25% of its listed capacity and social distancing/masking requirements were enforced. The Ivy League as a whole did not compete in any sport for the 2020-21 season due to COVID concerns, leaving out notable teams like Cornell and Princeton as well as notable wrestlers such as two-time NCAA champion Yianni Diakomihalis and returning All-American Vito Arujau.

In the tournament, Iowa clinched its first NCAA title since 2010 and finished with one individual national champion, while defending team champions Penn State became the runner-up of the tournament with four individual national champions. Little Rock made its NCAA tournament debut with one national qualifier, while it was also the last year for Stanford and Fresno State. Shane Griffith became the second ever NCAA champion from Stanford, and as a response to the cut of the school's wrestling team (which was eventually reversed following the tournament), he wore a black singlet with no logo during the finals match, took the podium wearing a "Keep Stanford Wrestling" t-shirt, and was named the Outstanding Wrestler afterwards. North Carolina also saw its first National champion since 1995, with Austin O'Connor at 149 pounds.

== Team results ==
- Note: Top 10 only
- (H): Team from hosting U.S. state

Rank	Team	Points
1	Iowa	129
2	Penn State	113 1/2
3	Oklahoma State	99 1/2
4	Arizona State	74
5	Michigan	69
6	NC State	68
7	Minnesota	64
8	Missouri (H)	64
9	Ohio State	46 1/2
10	Northwestern	45

== Individual results ==
- Note: Table does not include wrestlebacks
- (H): Individual from hosting U.S. State

Weight	First	Second	Third
125 lbs	#1 Spencer Lee; Iowa	#3 Brandon Courtney; Arizona State	#15 Patrick McKee; Minnesota
133 lbs	#2 Roman Bravo-Young; Penn State	#1 Daton Fix; Oklahoma State	#4 Austin DeSanto; Iowa
141 lbs	#2 Nick Lee; Penn State	#1 Jaydin Eierman; Iowa	#4 Tariq Wilson; NC State
149 lbs	#2 Austin O'Connor; North Carolina	#1 Sammy Sasso; Ohio State	#25 Yahya Thomas; Northwestern
157 lbs	#2 David Carr; Iowa State	#4 Jesse Dellavecchia; Rider	#1 Ryan Deakin; Northwestern
165 lbs	#8 Shane Griffith; Stanford	#3 Jake Wentzel; Pittsburgh	#6 Keegan O'Toole; Missouri (H)
174 lbs	#3 Carter Starocci; Penn State	#1 Michael Kemerer; Iowa	#4 Mikey Labriola; Nebraska
184 lbs	#1 Aaron Brooks; Penn State	#2 Trent Hidlay; NC State	#4 Parker Keckeisen; Northern Iowa
197 lbs	#4 A.J. Ferrari; Oklahoma State	#6 Nino Bonaccorsi; Pittsburgh	#1 Myles Amine; Michigan
285 lbs	#1 Gable Steveson; Minnesota	#2 Mason Parris; Michigan	#5 Tony Cassioppi; Iowa
