= 2023 Big Ten Wrestling Championships – 285 lbs =

285 pounds at the 2023 Big Ten Wrestling Championships
- Site: Crisler Center; Ann Arbor, Michigan
- Competitors: 14

Medalists
- 1st place, gold medalist(s): Mason Parris (Michigan)
- 2nd place, silver medalist(s): Greg Kerkvliet (Penn State)
- 3rd place, bronze medalist(s): Tony Cassioppi (Iowa)

The 285-pound competition at the 2023 Big Ten Wrestling Championships in Ann Arbor, Michigan, took place from March 4–5, 2023 at the Crisler Center.

The competition consisted of a triple-elimination tournament to determine the top ten wrestlers of the Big Ten's 285-pound weight class. The top nine wrestlers qualified for the 2023 NCAA Division I Wrestling Championships.

Mason Parris of Michigan won the tournament with a takedown in overtime for a 5–3 decision win in the finals over Greg Kerkvliet of Penn State.

== Preliminary seeds ==
The Big Ten announced the preliminary seeds on February 27, 2023.

Seed	Wrestler
1	Mason Parris (Michigan)
2	Greg Kerkvliet (Penn State)
3	Tony Cassioppi (Iowa)
4	Lucas Davison (Northwestern)
5	Trent Hillger (Wisconsin)
6	Boone McDermott (Rutgers)
7	Tate Orndoff (Ohio State)
8	Jacob Bullock (Indiana)
9	Jaron Smith (Maryland)
10	Hayden Copass (Purdue)
11	Garrett Joles (Minnesota)
12	Ryan Vasbinder (Michigan State)
13	Matt Wroblewski (Illinois)
14	Austin Emerson (Nebraska)

== Results ==
Legend

- F — Won by fall
- MF — Won by medical forfeit

=== Championship bracket ===
First Round
1	Mason Parris (MICH)
BYE
9	Jaron Smith (MD)	1
8	Jacob Bullock (IND)	4
5	Trent Hillger (WIS)	2^{F}
12	Ryan Vasbinder (MSU)	0
13	Matt Wroblewski (ILL)	0
4	Lucas Davison (NU)	3
3	Tony Cassioppi (IOWA)	10
14	Austin Emerson (NEB)	0
11	Garrett Joles (MINN)	4
6	Boone Mcdermott (RUT)	6
7	Tate Orndorff (OSU)	2
10	Hayden Copass (PUR)	0
BYE
2	Greg Kerkvliet (PSU)

Quarterfinals
1	Mason Parris (MICH)	12
8	Jacob Bullock (IND)	2
5	Trent Hillger (WIS)	3
4	Lucas Davison (NU)	1
3	Tony Cassioppi (IOWA)	4^{F}
6	Boone Mcdermott (RUT)	1
7	Tate Orndorff (OSU)	1
2	Greg Kerkvliet (PSU)	9

Semifinals
1	Mason Parris (MICH)	9
5	Trent Hillger (WIS)	3
3	Tony Cassioppi (IOWA)	0
2	Greg Kerkvliet (PSU)	5

1st-Place Match
1	Mason Parris (MICH)	5
2	Greg Kerkvliet (PSU)	3

=== Consolation bracket ===
Consolation Round 1
BYE
BYE

Consolation Round 2

Consolation Quarterfinals
7th-Place Match

Consolation Semifinals
5th-Place Match

3rd-Place Match

=== 9th-place bracket ===
9th-Place Quarterfinals
BYE
BYE

9th-Place Semifinals

9th-Place Match
