= Jonovan Smith =

Puerto Rican freestyle wrestler

Personal information
- Full name: Jonovan Darius Smith
- Nationality: Puerto Rican
- Born: February 19, 2001 (age 25) New Jersey, United States
- Height: 180 cm (5 ft 11 in)

Sport
- Sport: Wrestling
Medal record
Men's freestyle wrestling
Representing Puerto Rico
Pan American Championships
Silver medal – second place	2024 Acapulco	125 kg
Central American and Caribbean Games
Silver medal – second place	2023 San Salvador	125 kg
Silver medal – second place	2026 Santo Domingo	125 kg
Grand Prix
Gold medal – first place	2024 Sassari	125 kg
Bronze medal – third place	2024 Nice	125 kg
Bronze medal – third place	2024 Madrid	125 kg
Bronze medal – third place	2025 Madrid	125 kg
Bronze medal – third place	2026 Madrid	125 kg
Pan American U23 Championships
Bronze medal – third place	2024 Rionegro	125 kg
Men's beach wrestling
Central American and Caribbean Beach Games
Silver medal – second place	2022 Santa Marta	+90 kg
Beach Wrestling World Series
Silver medal – second place	2024 Acapulco	+90 kg

Jonovan Darius Smith (born February 19, 2001) is a Puerto Rican freestyle wrestler who competes in the 125 kg category.

== Folkstyle Career ==
He also competed for Cerritos College a junior college in California where he was a CCCAA champion and All-American. In 2026, Smith finished his NCAA folkstyle career at Maryville University in Missouri.

== Freestyle Career ==
In 2019, Smith was a Fargo Junior/u19 national champion at 215 lbs. representing Team California

He represented Puerto Rico at the 2024 Summer Olympics in Paris, finishing 14th in the men's freestyle 125 kg event.

Smith placed 16th at the 2023 World Wrestling Championships.
