= Wrestling at the 1952 Summer Olympics – Men's freestyle bantamweight =

Wrestling at the Olympics

Men's freestyle bantamweight at the Games of the XV Olympiad
- Venue: Messuhalli
- Dates: 20–23 July 1952
- Competitors: 20 from 20 nations

Medalists
1st place, gold medalist(s)		Shohachi Ishii	Japan
2nd place, silver medalist(s)		Rashid Mammadbeyov	Soviet Union
3rd place, bronze medalist(s)		K. D. Jadhav	India

The men's freestyle bantamweight competition at the 1952 Summer Olympics in Helsinki took place from 20 July to 23 July at Messuhalli. Nations were limited to one competitor. Bantamweight was the second-lightest category, including wrestlers weighing 52 to 57 kilograms (114.6 to 125.7 lb).

== Competition format ==
This freestyle wrestling competition continued to use the "bad points" elimination system introduced at the 1928 Summer Olympics for Greco-Roman and at the 1932 Summer Olympics for freestyle wrestling, removing the slight modification introduced in 1936 and used until 1948 (which had a reduced penalty for a loss by 2–1 decision). Each round featured all wrestlers pairing off and wrestling one bout (with one wrestler having a bye if there were an odd number). The loser received 3 points. The winner received 1 point if the win was by decision and 0 points if the win was by fall. At the end of each round, any wrestler with at least 5 points was eliminated. This elimination continued until the medal rounds, which began when 3 wrestlers remained. These 3 wrestlers each faced each other in a round-robin medal round (with earlier results counting, if any had wrestled another before); record within the medal round determined medals, with bad points breaking ties.

== Results ==
=== Round 1 ===
Kouyos and Trimpont withdrew after their bouts.

Bouts

Winner	Nation	Victory Type	Loser	Nation
Rashid Mammadbeyov	Soviet Union	Fall	Mohamed Mehdi Yaghoubi	Iran
Bill Borders	United States	Decision, 3–0	Paul Hänni	Switzerland
Sayed Hafez Shehata	Egypt	Fall	Oswaldo Johnston	Guatemala
Eigil Johansen	Denmark	Decision, 2–1	Joseph Trimpont	Belgium
Cemil Sarıbacak	Turkey	Fall	Lajos Bencze	Hungary
Shohachi Ishii	Japan	Decision, 3–0	Tauno Jaskari	Finland
Ken Irvine	Great Britain	Decision, 3–0	Omar Blebel	Argentina
Edvin Vesterby	Sweden	Decision, 2–1	Charles Kouyos	France
Ferdinand Schmitz	Germany	Fall	Leonardo Basurto	Mexico
Khashaba Dadasaheb Jadhav	India	Fall	Adrien Poliquin	Canada

Points

Rank	Wrestler	Nation	Start	Earned	Total
1	Khashaba Dadasaheb Jadhav	India	0	0	0
1	Rashid Mammadbeyov	Soviet Union	0	0	0
1	Cemil Sarıbacak	Turkey	0	0	0
1	Ferdinand Schmitz	Germany	0	0	0
1	Sayed Hafez Shehata	Egypt	0	0	0
6	Bill Borders	United States	0	1	1
6	Ken Irvine	Great Britain	0	1	1
6	Shohachi Ishii	Japan	0	1	1
6	Eigil Johansen	Denmark	0	1	1
6	Edvin Vesterby	Sweden	0	1	1
11	Leonardo Basurto	Mexico	0	3	3
11	Lajos Bencze	Hungary	0	3	3
11	Omar Blebel	Argentina	0	3	3
11	Paul Hänni	Switzerland	0	3	3
11	Tauno Jaskari	Finland	0	3	3
11	Oswaldo Johnston	Guatemala	0	3	3
11	Adrien Poliquin	Canada	0	3	3
11	Mohamed Mehdi Yaghoubi	Iran	0	3	3
19	Charles Kouyos	France	0	3	3*
19	Joseph Trimpont	Belgium	0	3	3*

=== Round 2 ===
Bouts

Winner	Nation	Victory Type	Loser	Nation
Rashid Mammadbeyov	Soviet Union	Walkover	Paul Hänni	Switzerland
Mohamed Mehdi Yaghoubi	Iran	Decision, 3–0	Bill Borders	United States
Eigil Johansen	Denmark	Decision, 3–0	Sayed Hafez Shehata	Egypt
Lajos Bencze	Hungary	Fall	Oswaldo Johnston	Guatemala
Cemil Sarıbacak	Turkey	Decision, 2–1	Tauno Jaskari	Finland
Shohachi Ishii	Japan	Fall	Ken Irvine	Great Britain
Edvin Vesterby	Sweden	Fall	Omar Blebel	Argentina
Khashaba Dadasaheb Jadhav	India	Fall	Leonardo Basurto	Mexico
Ferdinand Schmitz	Germany	Fall	Adrien Poliquin	Canada

Points

Rank	Wrestler	Nation	Start	Earned	Total
1	Khashaba Dadasaheb Jadhav	India	0	0	0
1	Rashid Mammadbeyov	Soviet Union	0	0	0
1	Ferdinand Schmitz	Germany	0	0	0
4	Shohachi Ishii	Japan	1	0	1
4	Cemil Sarıbacak	Turkey	0	1	1
4	Edvin Vesterby	Sweden	1	0	1
7	Eigil Johansen	Denmark	1	1	2
8	Lajos Bencze	Hungary	3	0	3
8	Sayed Hafez Shehata	Egypt	0	3	3
10	Bill Borders	United States	1	3	4
10	Ken Irvine	Great Britain	1	3	4
10	Mohamed Mehdi Yaghoubi	Iran	3	1	4
13	Leonardo Basurto	Mexico	3	3	6
13	Omar Blebel	Argentina	3	3	6
13	Paul Hänni	Switzerland	3	3	6
13	Tauno Jaskari	Finland	3	3	6
13	Oswaldo Johnston	Guatemala	3	3	6
13	Adrien Poliquin	Canada	3	3	6

=== Round 3 ===
Bouts

Winner	Nation	Victory Type	Loser	Nation
Rashid Mammadbeyov	Soviet Union	Fall	Bill Borders	United States
Mohamed Mehdi Yaghoubi	Iran	Decision, 3–0	Sayed Hafez Shehata	Egypt
Lajos Bencze	Hungary	Decision, 3–0	Eigil Johansen	Denmark
Shohachi Ishii	Japan	Decision, 3–0	Cemil Sarıbacak	Turkey
Edvin Vesterby	Sweden	Fall	Ken Irvine	Great Britain
Khashaba Dadasaheb Jadhav	India	Decision, 3–0	Ferdinand Schmitz	Germany

Points

Rank	Wrestler	Nation	Start	Earned	Total
1	Rashid Mammadbeyov	Soviet Union	0	0	0
2	Khashaba Dadasaheb Jadhav	India	0	1	1
2	Edvin Vesterby	Sweden	1	0	1
4	Shohachi Ishii	Japan	1	1	2
5	Ferdinand Schmitz	Germany	0	3	3
6	Lajos Bencze	Hungary	3	1	4
6	Cemil Sarıbacak	Turkey	1	3	4
8	Eigil Johansen	Denmark	2	3	5
8	Mohamed Mehdi Yaghoubi	Iran	4	1	5
10	Sayed Hafez Shehata	Egypt	3	3	6
11	Bill Borders	United States	4	3	7
11	Ken Irvine	Great Britain	4	3	7

=== Round 4 ===
Bouts

Winner	Nation	Victory Type	Loser	Nation
Lajos Bencze	Hungary	Decision, 2–1	Rashid Mammadbeyov	Soviet Union
Cemil Sarıbacak	Turkey	Decision, 3–0	Edvin Vesterby	Sweden
Shohachi Ishii	Japan	Decision, 2–1	Ferdinand Schmitz	Germany
Khashaba Dadasaheb Jadhav	India	Bye	N/A	N/A

Points

Rank	Wrestler	Nation	Start	Earned	Total
1	Khashaba Dadasaheb Jadhav	India	1	0	1
2	Shohachi Ishii	Japan	2	1	3
2	Rashid Mammadbeyov	Soviet Union	0	3	3
4	Edvin Vesterby	Sweden	1	3	4
5	Lajos Bencze	Hungary	4	1	5
5	Cemil Sarıbacak	Turkey	4	1	5
7	Ferdinand Schmitz	Germany	3	3	6

=== Round 5 ===
Bouts

Winner	Nation	Victory Type	Loser	Nation
Rashid Mammadbeyov	Soviet Union	Decision, 3–0	Khashaba Dadasaheb Jadhav	India
Shohachi Ishii	Japan	Decision, 3–0	Edvin Vesterby	Sweden

Points

Rank	Wrestler	Nation	Start	Earned	Total
1	Shohachi Ishii	Japan	3	1	4
1	Khashaba Dadasaheb Jadhav	India	1	3	4
1	Rashid Mammadbeyov	Soviet Union	3	1	4
4	Edvin Vesterby	Sweden	4	3	7

=== Medal rounds ===
Mammadbeyov's victory over Jadhav in round 5 counted for the medal rounds.

Bouts

Winner	Nation	Victory Type	Loser	Nation
Shohachi Ishii	Japan	Decision, 3–0	Khashaba Dadasaheb Jadhav	India
Shohachi Ishii	Japan	Decision, 3–0	Rashid Mammadbeyov	Soviet Union

Points

Rank	Wrestler	Nation	Wins	Losses	Start	Earned	Total
1st place, gold medalist(s)	Shohachi Ishii	Japan	2	0	4	2	6
2nd place, silver medalist(s)	Rashid Mammadbeyov	Soviet Union	1	1	4	3	7
3rd place, bronze medalist(s)	Khashaba Dadasaheb Jadhav	India	0	2	4	3	7
