= Northern Iowa Panthers =

University of Northern Iowa athletic teams

- University: University of Northern Iowa
- NCAA: Division I (FCS)
- Conference: Missouri Valley (primary); Missouri Valley Football Conference; Big 12 (wrestling)
- Athletic director: Megan Franklin
- Location: Cedar Falls, Iowa
- Varsity teams: 15
- Football stadium: UNI-Dome
- Basketball arena: McLeod Center
- Nickname: Panthers
- Colors: Purple and old gold
- Mascot: TC/TK Panther
- Fight song: "UNI Fight"
- Website: unipanthers.com

The Northern Iowa Panthers are the athletic teams of the University of Northern Iowa. The university is a member of the Missouri Valley Conference and competes in NCAA Division I (Division I FCS in football).

== History ==
The school's mascot is the Panther. They participate in the Missouri Valley Conference for all sports except football and wrestling, in which they are a member of the Missouri Valley Football Conference (formerly the Gateway Football Conference) and the Big Twelve Conference. Northern Iowa previously competed in the Iowa Intercollegiate Athletic Conference (now known as the American Rivers Conference), North Central Conference, and the Mid-Continent Conference (now known as the Summit League).

Northern Iowa joined Division I in 1980.

=== History of UNI nickname ===
On September 8, 1931, the following appeal appeared in the student newspaper, the College Eye, under the headline "Contest Started for School Name":

"Who wants to be called Tutors, Pedagogues, and Teachers all the time? Every leading school in the country has some name by which they are known in the realm of sport. Iowa is known as the Hawkeyes, Minnesota as Gophers, Chicago as Maroons, and so forth. Why not give Iowa State Teachers College a name which signifies something characteristic about the school besides the fact that it is a teachers college?"

The article goes on to note that entries would be judged by a member of the Department of Physical Education, other faculty, and students.

When the contest was announced, the Iowa State Teachers College had already been participating in intercollegiate athletics on a regular and organized basis for over thirty-five years. Teachers College teams had participated in contests with other Iowa colleges, and occasionally with teams from outside the state, in baseball, football, basketball, and track and field. Until the end of World War I, students certainly did get excited about these contests, but they probably took just as much pleasure in the success of the school's debate and oratorical teams. The school's sole mission, the preparation of teachers, tended to attract many more women than men to the Teachers College. And, consequently, the school did not have an abundance of material from which to draw its athletes in the days when only men participated in intercollegiate athletics. Following the war, however, the college made a distinct effort to attract men to the teaching profession. An important part of this effort was the addition of physical education courses to the curriculum that would help to prepare men for teaching positions that included athletics coaching responsibilities. Improved athletics facilities, including the construction of the West Gymnasium, showed that the school was taking a more serious attitude toward intercollegiate athletics.

On September 18, 1931, the College Eye announced that Paul Bender, acting head of the Department of Physical Education for Men; George Holmes, professor of journalism; Robert Burley, president of the Student Council; and the sports editor of the College Eye would judge entries. The winner would receive a leather briefcase from the Berg Drug Company. Second place would be a dresser alarm clock from Chase Jewelry Store. Third place would be a season football pass.

The winning name "Purple Panthers" was submitted by Burl Berry, a center on the football team.

== Sports sponsored ==
Men's sports	Women's sports
Basketball	Basketball
Cross country	Cross country
Football	Golf
Golf	Soccer
Track and field^{1}	Softball
Wrestling	Swimming and diving
	Tennis
	Track and field^{1}
	Volleyball
^{1} – Track and field includes both indoor and outdoor

=== Baseball ===
UNI's men's baseball program was discontinued after the 2008–2009 season.

In 1961, the Panthers led by future Baltimore RP Eddie Watt qualified for the NCAA Division 1 Baseball Tournament losing in the District 5 Final to eventual CWS Runner-Up Oklahoma State in Stillwater. The Panthers also qualified for the NCAA Tournament in 1958 and 2001.

Other MLB players who attended UNI include Duane Josephson, the first Panther named All-American and who led the nation in HR's.

=== Men's basketball ===
==== NCAA Tournament history ====
Season	Seed	Eliminated Round	Teams Defeated	Lost to
1962 (College Division)	N/A	2nd Round	Hamline	Nebraska Wesleyan
1964 (College Division)	N/A	4th Place	Washington (MO); Mankato State; Southeast Missouri	Evansville; North Carolina A&T
1979 (Division II)	N/A	2nd Round	Nebraska-Omaha	Wisconsin–Green Bay
1990	(14)	2nd Round	(3) Missouri	(6) Minnesota
2004	(14)	1st Round	—	(3) Georgia Tech
2005	(11)	1st Round	—	(6) Wisconsin
2006	(10)	1st Round	—	(7) Georgetown
2009	(12)	1st Round	—	(5) Purdue
2010	(9)	3rd Round(Sweet 16)	(8) UNLV (1) Kansas	(5) Michigan State
2015	(5)	3rd Round	(12) Wyoming	(4) Louisville
2016	(11)	3rd Round	(6) Texas	(3) Texas A&M
2026	(12)	2nd Round	—	(5) St. John's

==== Other tournaments ====
- NAIA National Tournament appearances: 1946, 1948, 1949, and 1953 (2–4 combined tournament record)
- Competed in the 2007 World University Games as Team USA (finished ninth)

=== Women's basketball ===
Jacqui Kalin helped lead the women's basketball team to consecutive NCAA Tournament berths, as the team won back-to-back MVC Tournament titles. In her freshman year in 2007–08, she led the MVC with an .899 free throw percentage (a school record), and was named MVC Freshman of the Year. In 2010–11 she was named the Jackie Stiles MVC Player of the Year. In 2012–13 she led the league in scoring (19.5 ppg; a school record), had the fourth-highest season free throw percentage in NCAA Division 1 history-and the highest of any senior (95.5%), and was again named the Jackie Stiles MVC Player of the Year. For her career Kalin was first all-time at UNI in scoring (2,081), 3-point field goals made (265), free throws made (484), and free throw percentage (.920; the NCAA Division 1 career record.

Coach	Record	When coached	No. of years
Tanya Warren	267–194	2007–present	Current
Tony DiCecco	183–161	1995–2007	12 years
Wanda Green	78–59	1968–1978	10 years
J.D. Anderson	59–55	1980–1984	4 years
Kim Mayden	36–96	1984–1989	5 years
Terri Lasswel	35–125	1989–1995	6 years
Sandra Williamson	7–40	1978–1980	2 years

==== NCAA Tournament history ====
Season	Seed	Eliminated round	Teams defeated	Lost to
2010	(16)	1st Round	—	(1) Nebraska
2011	(13)	1st Round	—	(4) Michigan State
2017	(10)	1st Round	—	(7) DePaul

==== WNIT history ====
Season	Seed	Eliminated round	Teams defeated	Lost to
2001	N/A	1st Round		DePaul
2003	N/A	1st Round		Baylor
2006	N/A	1st Round		Kansas State
2013	N/A	2nd Round	Marquette	Ball State
2015	N/A	1st Round		Missouri
2016	N/A	3rd Round	Nebraska Drake	South Dakota

=== Football ===
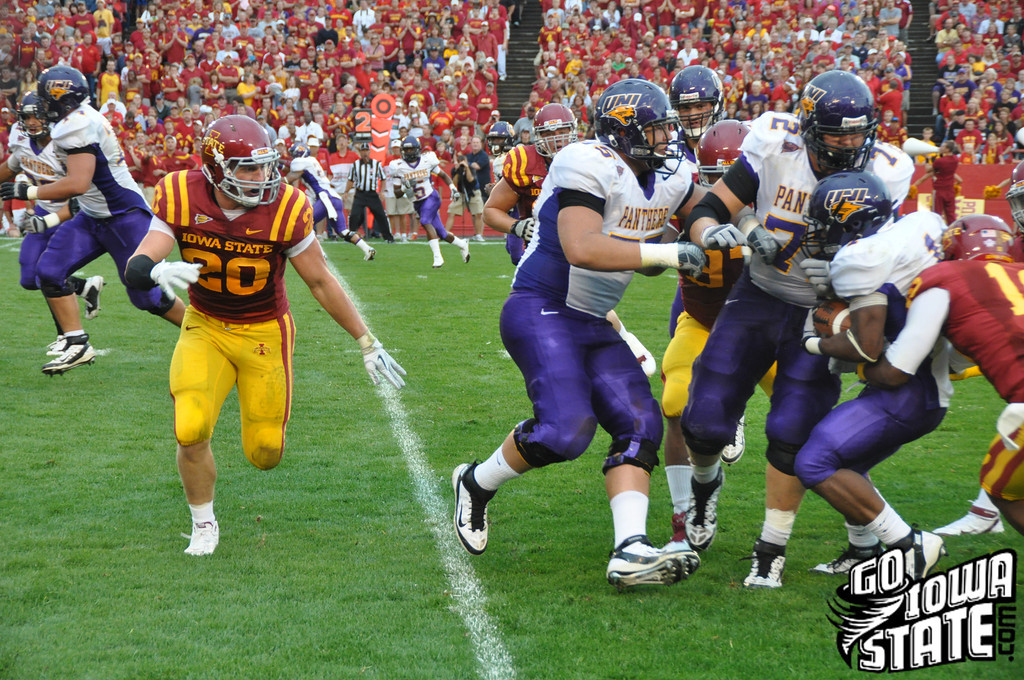
The Panthers v Iowa State in 2011

The program began in 1895 and has fielded a team every year since with the exceptions of 1906–1907 and 1943–1944. The Panthers play their home games at the UNI-Dome on the campus of the University of Northern Iowa, in Cedar Falls, Iowa. Northern Iowa has won thirty-three conference titles, the most out of the four Iowa Division I institutions.

=== Softball ===
In the 1977 AIAW Women's College World Series, the Panther softball team defeated Arizona, 7–0, in the deciding final game, led by pitcher Pat Stockman to earn the university's first team national championship. The softball team has appeared in four Women's College World Series, in 1973, 1975, 1976 and 1977. In 1982, then competing at the Division II level, the softball team won a second AIAW national title.

=== Conference memberships ===
- Independent (1895–1922)
- Iowa Intercollegiate Athletic Conference (1923–1934)
- North Central Intercollegiate Athletic Conference (1935–1977)
- Mid-Continent Conference (1978–1984)
- Gateway Football Conference/Missouri Valley Football Conference (1985–present)

=== Wrestling ===
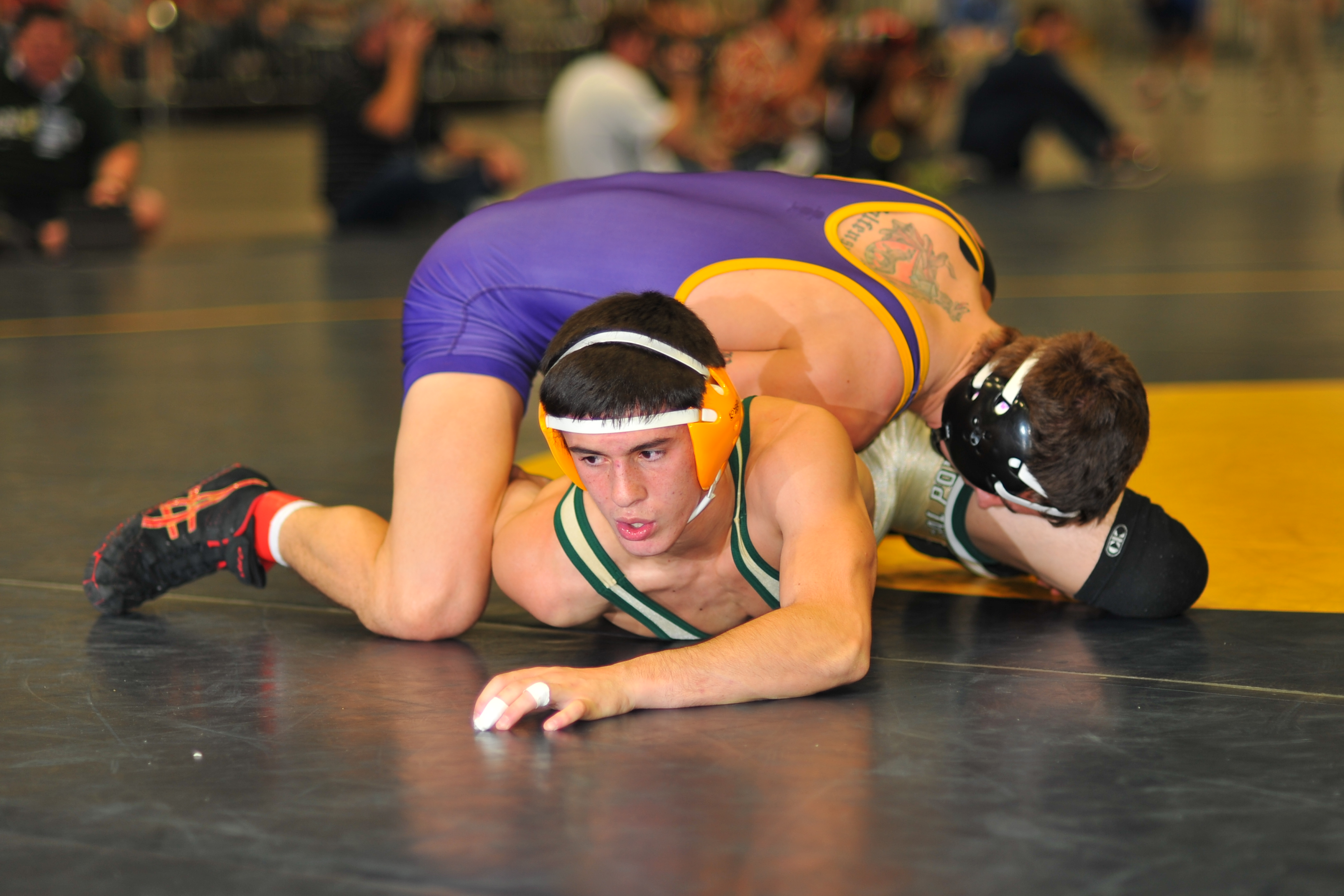
UNI wrestling match in 2012

The University of Northern Iowa Wrestling team, founded in 1923, won the NCAA (Single division) national championship in 1950 and the NCAA Division II national championships in 1975 and 1978. They competed in the Western Wrestling Conference until 2012, when UNI became an associate member of the Mid-American Conference since the MVC is a non-wrestling conference. The Panthers continued to compete in the MAC through the 2016–17 season, after which they moved to the Big 12.

Doug Schwab is the current head coach for the Northern Iowa Wrestling Team. Mission Statement - To communicate with UNI wrestling fans to support, encourage, promote a successful UNI wrestling tradition.

In the 2013–2014 season, head coach Doug Schwab led the Panthers to a perfect 13–0 season in dual meets, the only division one wrestling team to go undefeated.

Northern Iowa Panther Wrestling Accomplishments:

- NCAA (Single division) Team Champions in 1950
- NCAA Division II Team Champions in 1975
- NCAA Division II Team Champions in 1978
- NCAA (Single division) Team Runner-Up in 1946, 1947, 1949 and 1952
- NCAA Division II Team Runner-Up in 1970, 1972, 1974 and 1980
- NCAA (Single division) Team Third Place in 1937
- NCAA Division II Team Third Place in 1963, 1967, 1969, 1976, 1977 and 1979.

Notable wrestlers:

- Olympic Gold Medalist (1952) William Smith wrestled for Iowa State Teachers College (1949 and 1950 NCAA champion)
- Olympic Silver Medalist (1948) Gerald Leeman wrestled for Iowa State Teachers College (1946 NCAA champion)
- Pan American Games Gold Medalist (1975) Mike McCready
- Pan American Games Gold Medalist (1993) Justin Greenlee
- Pan American Games Silver Medalist (1990) Mark Pustelnik
- Three-time NCAA Champion (1946-47-48) Bill Koll and member of the 1948 U.S. Olympic team, finishing 5th
- Three-time NCAA Champion (1947, 1949–50) Bill Nelson and member of the 1948 U.S. Olympic team
- Three-time NCAA Champion (1949-50-51) Keith Young
- Three-time NCAA Division II Champion (1976-77-78) Gary Bentrim
- Three-time NCAA Division II Champion (1978-79-80) and six-time All-American Kirk Meyers
- National Champion, 5-time all American, 5 time Big 12 champion and a three time NCAA finalist Parker Keckeisen
