= Wrestling at the 1948 Summer Olympics – Men's freestyle bantamweight =

Wrestling at the Olympics

Men's freestyle bantamweight at the Games of the XIV Olympiad
- Venue: Empress Hall, Earls Court Exhibition Centre
- Dates: 29–31 July 1948
- Competitors: 15 from 15 nations

Medalists
1st place, gold medalist(s)		Nasuh Akar	Turkey
2nd place, silver medalist(s)		Gerald Leeman	United States
3rd place, bronze medalist(s)		Charles Kouyos	France

The men's freestyle bantamweight competition at the 1948 Summer Olympics in London took place from 29 July to 31 July at the Empress Hall, Earls Court Exhibition Centre. Nations were limited to one competitor. Bantamweight was the second-lightest category, including wrestlers weighing 52 to 57 kilograms (114.6 to 125.7 lb).

This freestyle wrestling competition continued to use the "bad points" elimination system introduced at the 1928 Summer Olympics for Greco-Roman and at the 1932 Summer Olympics for freestyle wrestling, with the slight modification introduced in 1936. Each round featured all wrestlers pairing off and wrestling one bout (with one wrestler having a bye if there were an odd number). The loser received 3 points if the loss was by fall or unanimous decision and 2 points if the decision was 2-1 (this was the modification from prior years, where all losses were 3 points). The winner received 1 point if the win was by decision and 0 points if the win was by fall. At the end of each round, any wrestler with at least 5 points was eliminated.

== Results ==
=== Round 1 ===
Bouts

Winner	Nation	Victory Type	Loser	Nation
Lajos Bencze	Hungary	Decision, 2–1	Erkki Johansson	Finland
Erik Persson	Sweden	Decision, 3–0	Walter Wenger	Switzerland
Charles Kouyos	France	Decision, 3–0	Sayed Hafez Shehata	Egypt
Joseph Trimpont	Belgium	Fall	Fabio Santamaria	Cuba
Nasuh Akar	Turkey	Fall	Norman May	Canada
Ray Cazaux	Great Britain	Decision, 3–0	Francisco Vicera	Philippines
Gerald Leeman	United States	Fall	Nirmal Bhose	India
Han Sang-ryong	South Korea	Bye	N/A	N/A

Points

Rank	Wrestler	Nation	Start	Earned	Total
1	Nasuh Akar	Turkey	0	0	0
1	Han Sang-ryong	South Korea	0	0	0
1	Gerald Leeman	United States	0	0	0
1	Joseph Trimpont	Belgium	0	0	0
5	Lajos Bencze	Hungary	0	1	1
5	Ray Cazaux	Great Britain	0	1	1
5	Charles Kouyos	France	0	1	1
5	Erik Persson	Sweden	0	1	1
9	Erkki Johansson	Finland	0	2	2
10	Nirmal Bhose	India	0	3	3
10	Sayed Hafez Shehata	Egypt	0	3	3
10	Norman May	Canada	0	3	3
10	Fabio Santamaria	Cuba	0	3	3
10	Francisco Vicera	Philippines	0	3	3
10	Walter Wenger	Switzerland	0	3	3

=== Round 2 ===
Bouts

Winner	Nation	Victory Type	Loser	Nation
Erik Persson	Sweden	Decision, 3–0	Han Sang-ryong	South Korea
Nasuh Akar	Turkey	Decision, 3–0	Walter Wenger	Switzerland
Lajos Bencze	Hungary	Decision, 3–0	Norman May	Canada
Erkki Johansson	Finland	Decision, 2–1	Nirmal Bhose	India
Gerald Leeman	United States	Fall	Ray Cazaux	Great Britain
Charles Kouyos	France	Fall	Francisco Vicera	Philippines
Sayed Hafez Shehata	Egypt	Fall	Fabio Santamaria	Cuba
Joseph Trimpont	Belgium	Bye	N/A	N/A

Points

Rank	Wrestler	Nation	Start	Earned	Total
1	Gerald Leeman	United States	0	0	0
1	Joseph Trimpont	Belgium	0	0	0
3	Nasuh Akar	Turkey	0	1	1
3	Charles Kouyos	France	1	0	1
5	Lajos Bencze	Hungary	1	1	2
6	Erik Persson	Sweden	1	1	2
7	Sayed Hafez Shehata	Egypt	3	0	3
7	Han Sang-ryong	South Korea	0	3	3
7	Erkki Johansson	Finland	2	1	3
10	Ray Cazaux	Great Britain	1	3	4
11	Nirmal Bhose	India	3	2	5
12	Norman May	Canada	3	3	6
12	Fabio Santamaria	Cuba	3	3	6
12	Francisco Vicera	Philippines	3	3	6
12	Walter Wenger	Switzerland	3	3	6

=== Round 3 ===
Hafez Shehata is officially listed as part of the tie for 5th place despite having 6 points to the other 5th place finishers' 5 points.

Bouts

Winner	Nation	Victory Type	Loser	Nation
Joseph Trimpont	Belgium	Decision, 3–0	Han Sang-ryong	South Korea
Nasuh Akar	Turkey	Decision, 3–0	Erik Persson	Sweden
Gerald Leeman	United States	Decision, 3–0	Lajos Bencze	Hungary
Charles Kouyos	France	Fall	Erkki Johansson	Finland
Ray Cazaux	Great Britain	Decision, 3–0	Sayed Hafez Shehata	Egypt

Points

Rank	Wrestler	Nation	Start	Earned	Total
1	Charles Kouyos	France	1	0	1
1	Gerald Leeman	United States	0	1	1
1	Joseph Trimpont	Belgium	0	1	1
4	Nasuh Akar	Turkey	1	1	2
5	Lajos Bencze	Hungary	2	3	5
5	Ray Cazaux	Great Britain	4	1	5
5	Erik Persson	Sweden	2	3	5
5	Sayed Hafez Shehata	Egypt	3	3	6
9	Han Sang-ryong	South Korea	3	3	6
9	Erkki Johansson	Finland	3	3	6

=== Round 4 ===
Bouts

Winner	Nation	Victory Type	Loser	Nation
Nasuh Akar	Turkey	Fall	Joseph Trimpont	Belgium
Gerald Leeman	United States	Decision, 3–0	Charles Kouyos	France

Points

Rank	Wrestler	Nation	Start	Earned	Total
1	Nasuh Akar	Turkey	2	0	2
1	Gerald Leeman	United States	1	1	2
3	Charles Kouyos	France	1	3	4
3	Joseph Trimpont	Belgium	1	3	4

=== Round 5 ===
Kouyos took the bronze over Trimpont "based on more wins." Both finished with 7 points and had not faced each other. Kouyos was 3–2 while Trimpont was only 2–2 after receiving a second-round bye.

Bouts

Winner	Nation	Victory Type	Loser	Nation
Gerald Leeman	United States	Decision, 3–0	Joseph Trimpont	Belgium
Nasuh Akar	Turkey	Fall	Charles Kouyos	France

Points

Rank	Wrestler	Nation	Start	Earned	Total
1	Nasuh Akar	Turkey	2	0	2
2	Gerald Leeman	United States	2	1	3
3rd place, bronze medalist(s)	Charles Kouyos	France	4	3	7
4	Joseph Trimpont	Belgium	4	3	7

=== Round 6 ===
Bouts

Winner	Nation	Victory Type	Loser	Nation
Nasuh Akar	Turkey	Fall	Gerald Leeman	United States

Points

Rank	Wrestler	Nation	Start	Earned	Total
1st place, gold medalist(s)	Nasuh Akar	Turkey	2	0	2
2nd place, silver medalist(s)	Gerald Leeman	United States	2	3	5
