= 1947 NCAA wrestling championships =

American collegiate wrestling tournament

1947 NCAA Wrestling Championships
Tournament information
- Sport: College wrestling
- Location: Champaign, Illinois
- Dates: March 28, 1947–March 29, 1947
- Host: University of Illinois
- Venue: Huff Gymnasium

Final positions
- Champions: Cornell College (1st title)
- 1st runners-up: Iowa State Teachers College
- 2nd runners-up: Oklahoma A&M
- MVP: Bill Koll (Iowa State Teachers College)

The 1947 NCAA Wrestling Championships were the 17th NCAA Wrestling Championships to be held. The University of Illinois in Champaign, Illinois hosted the tournament at Huff Gymnasium.

Cornell College took home the team championship with 32 points, and having two individual champions.

Bill Koll of Iowa State Teachers College was named the Outstanding Wrestler.

== Team results ==
Rank	School	Points
1	Cornell College	32
2	Iowa State Teachers College	19
3	Oklahoma A&M	15
4	Michigan State	11
5	Oklahoma	10
6	Illinois	9
7	Iowa	6
T-8	Purdue	5
T-8	Iowa State College	5
T-10	Minnesota	4
T-10	Michigan	4

== Individual finals ==
Weight class	Championship match (champion in boldface)
121 lbs	**Dick Hauser**, Cornell College WBF Bill Jernigan, Oklahoma A&M, 3:34
128 lbs	**Russ Bush**, Iowa State Teachers College DEC Lou Kachiroubas, Illinois, 4–2
136 lbs	**Lowell Lange**, Cornell College DEC Nathan Bauer, Oklahoma A&M, 6–3
145 lbs	**Bill Koll**, Iowa State Teachers College DEC Rodger Snook, Cornell College, 7–2
155 lbs	**Gale Mikles**, Michigan State DEC Bill Courtright, Michigan, 2–0
165 lbs	**Bill Nelson**, Iowa State Teachers College WBF Jim Eagleton, Oklahoma, 7:36
175 lbs	**Joe Scarpello**, Iowa DEC Glen Brand, Iowa State College, 10–6
UNL	**Dick Hutton**, Oklahoma A&M DEC OT Ray Gunkel, Purdue, 5–3
