= 1948 NCAA wrestling championships =

American collegiate wrestling tournament

1948 NCAA Wrestling Championships
Tournament information
- Sport: College wrestling
- Location: Bethlehem, Pennsylvania
- Dates: March 19, 1948–March 20, 1948
- Host(s): Lehigh
- Venue(s): Taylor Gymnasium

Final positions
- Champions: Oklahoma A&M (15th title)
- 1st runners-up: Michigan State
- 2nd runners-up: Illinois
- MVP: Bill Koll (Iowa State Teachers College)

The 1948 NCAA Wrestling Championships were the 18th NCAA Wrestling Championships to be held. Lehigh in Bethlehem, Pennsylvania hosted the tournament at Taylor Gymnasium.

Oklahoma A&M took home the team championship with 33 points and having two individual champions.

Bill Koll of Iowa State Teachers College was named the Outstanding Wrestler.

== Team results ==
Rank	School	Points
1	Oklahoma A&M	33
2	Michigan State	28
3	Illinois	23
T-4	Purdue	15
T-4	Iowa State Teachers College	15
T-4	Iowa	15
7	Minnesota	12
8	Waynesburg	11
T-9	Navy	9
T-9	Iowa State College	9
T-9	Northern Colorado	9

== Individual finals ==
Weight class	Championship match (champion in boldface)
114 lbs	**Arnold Plaza**, Purdue DEC William Mann, Illinois
125 lbs	**George Lewis**, Waynesburg DEC Rometo Macias, Iowa
136 lbs	**Dick Dickenson**, Michigan State DEC Nathan Bauer, Oklahoma A&M
147 lbs	**Bill Koll**, Iowa State Teachers College DEC John Fletcher, Navy
160 lbs	**Jack St. Clair** Oklahoma A&M DEC Gale Mikles, Michigan State
174 lbs	**Glen Brand**, Iowa State College DEC Waldemar VanCott, Purdue
191 lbs	**Verne Gagne**, Minnesota DEC Charles Gottfried, Illinois
UNL	**Dick Hutton**, Oklahoma A&M DEC Bob Maldegan, Michigan State
