= Bill Borders =

American wrestler (1930–2022)

Personal information
- Born: March 3, 1930 Tulsa, Oklahoma, U.S.
- Died: January 27, 2022 (aged 91)
- Education: University of Oklahoma
- Occupation: Attorney

Sport
- Country: United States
- Sport: Wrestling
- Weight class: 125.5 lb (56.9 kg)
- Events: Freestyle and Folkstyle
- College team: Oklahoma
- Team: USA
- Coached by: Port Robertson
Medal record
Collegiate Wrestling
Representing the Oklahoma Sooners
NCAA Championships
Gold medal – first place	1952 Fort Collins	123 lb
Silver medal – second place	1951 Bethlehem	123 lb

William Dean Borders (March 3, 1930 – January 27, 2022) was an American wrestler. He was a three-time Big Seven Conference champion at 123 lb (56 kg) from 1950 to 1952, and was the 1951 NCAA runner-up and 1952 NCAA champion for the University of Oklahoma. and competed in the men's freestyle bantamweight at the 1952 Summer Olympics. Borders and other members of the wrestling team did not participate in the opening ceremonies because tryouts were still in progress.

Borders won three consecutive individual Big Seven Conference titles at 123 lb (56 kg) from 1950 to 1952, helping the Oklahoma Sooners win team conference championships all three years. In the 123 lb (56 kg) finals at the 1951 NCAA championships, Borders lost to Tony Gizoni of Waynesburg University in the championship match, though the Sooners still won the team title by one point over in-state rival Oklahoma State. The following year, Borders captured the 1952 individual NCAA title at 123 lb (56 kg) with a victory over Will Howard of the University of Denver, with Oklahoma securing its second consecutive NCAA team title.

During the 1952 Summer Olympics in Helsinki, Borders won his first match against Swiss wrestler Paul Hänni before losing to Mohamed Mehdi Yaghoubi of Iran in the second round and eventual silver medalist Rashid Mammadbeyov in the third round. Borders later said in an interview, "We really didn't know that much about the international rules when we went over there... For instance, I was good at takedowns, but you didn't get any points for takedowns or escapes. You only got points for exposing your opponent's back to the mat. So, we had to adjust our style to the international style."

Borders did not begin wrestling until his freshman year at Webster High School in Tulsa, Oklahoma, taking advice from his gym coach to join the team. He began to take the sport seriously upon learning from a teammate that colleges gave scholarships to top wrestlers, ultimately earning a spot in the Oklahoma Sooners wrestling program coached by Port Robertson. Borders went on to practice law in Tulsa, Oklahoma.
