= Glen Brand =

American wrestler (1923–2008)

Personal information
- Born: November 3, 1923 Clarion, Iowa, U.S.
- Died: November 15, 2008 (aged 85) Omaha, Nebraska, U.S.

Sport
- Country: United States
- Sport: Wrestling
- Events: Freestyle and Folkstyle
- College team: Iowa State
- Team: USA
Medal record
Men's freestyle wrestling
Representing the United States
Olympic Games
Gold medal – first place	1948 London	79 kg
Collegiate Wrestling
Representing the Iowa State Cyclones
NCAA Championships
Gold medal – first place	1948 Bethlehem	174 lb
Silver medal – second place	1947 Champaign	175 lb
Bronze medal – third place	1946 Stillwater	Heavyweight

Glen Brand (3 November 1923 – 15 November 2008) was an American wrestler and Olympic champion in Freestyle wrestling. Brand competed in freestyle wrestling at the 1948 Summer Olympics in London, where he received a gold medal in the middleweight (79 kg) class.

He was a raised in Clarion, Iowa and a graduate of Iowa State University. He was a three-time All-American for the Cyclones with an overall record of 54-3, earning a reputation as a fierce competitor and pinner. He was the first ISU athlete named to The Des Moines Register Sports Hall of Fame. In 1978, Brand was inducted into the National Wrestling Hall of Fame as a Distinguished Member.

A high school wrestling tournament is held each year in his hometown of Clarion, Iowa. He died in Omaha, Nebraska in 2008, at the age of 85.

== Glen Brand Wrestling Hall of Fame of Iowa ==
The "Glen Brand Wrestling Hall of Fame of Iowa" began in 2002 and honors people connected to wrestling and Iowa. It is part of the National Wrestling Hall of Fame Dan Gable Museum in Waterloo, Iowa, which is operated by the Dan Gable International Wrestling Institute and Museum. The National Wrestling Hall of Fame Dan Gable Museum, should not be confused with the National Wrestling Hall of Fame and Museum in Stillwater, Oklahoma.
