= Paul Hänni =

Paul Hänni may refer to:

- Paul Hänni (sprinter)
- Paul Hänni (wrestler)
