= Erik Persson =

Erik Persson may refer to:

- Erik Persson (footballer) (1909–1989), Swedish footballer, bandy player and ice hockey player
- Erik Persson (skier) (born 1995), Swedish skier and Paralympic guide for Zebastian Modin
- Erik Persson (swimmer) (born 1994), Swedish swimmer
- Erik Persson (wrestler) (1914–1969), Swedish wrestler
- Erik Persson (handballer) (born 1998), Swedish handball player

== See also ==
- Eric Persson (1898–1984), chairman of the Swedish football club Malmö FF
