= Port Robertson =

American wrestling coach

Biographical details
- Born: June 29, 1914; Harrah, Oklahoma, U.S.
- Died: June 10, 2003 (aged 88); Norman, Oklahoma, U.S.

Playing career
- 1935–1937: Oklahoma

Coaching career (HC unless noted)
- –: Michigan (assistant)
- 1947–1959: Oklahoma
- 1962: Oklahoma

Head coaching record
- Overall: 88–27–7 (.750)

Accomplishments and honors

Championships
- 3x NCAA Wrestling Championships (1951, 1953, 1957); 9x Big 7 Championships (1948, 1950, 1951, 1952, 1953, 1954, 1955, 1956, 1957)

Records
- Sports career
Medal record
Collegiate Wrestling
Representing the Oklahoma Sooners
NCAA Wrestling Championships
Bronze medal – third place	1935 Bethlehem	165 lb

Porter Glen "Port" Robertson (June 29, 1914 – June 10, 2003) was a former amateur freestyle wrestler and successful collegiate and Olympic wrestling coach. Robertson led the University of Oklahoma wrestling team to three NCAA wrestling championships in the 1950s and coached the United States freestyle wrestling team to three gold medals in the 1960 Summer Olympics in Rome, Italy.

== Early life ==
Port Robertson was born in Harrah, Oklahoma, and raised in nearby Edmond. In high school, he competed in football, wrestling, and track. Robertson earned a bachelor of arts in history from the University of Oklahoma and a master's degree in history at the University of Michigan.

== Wrestling career ==
At the University of Oklahoma, Robertson joined the Sooners' wrestling program under Paul Keen, brother of Michigan wrestling coach Cliff Keen. Wrestling at 165 pounds (75 kg), Robertson won an individual Big Six Conference championship and earned All-American honors in 1935. He suffered a knee injury in 1936 and chipped a vertebra in his neck during tryouts for the 1936 Summer Olympics in Berlin, but returned in 1937 to win a second Big Six conference title. Robertson's overall collegiate record was 20–4.

== World War II service ==
Robertson served in the United States Army for five and a half years, serving in World War II as an artillery officer and rising to the rank of captain. He participated in the invasion of Normandy at Omaha Beach in 1944; during the battle an artillery shell exploded nearby, resulting in injuries that included permanent loss of much of his hearing. Robertson was awarded both the Bronze Star and the Purple Heart for this action.

== Coaching career ==
After a stint as an assistant at the University of Michigan under head coach Cliff Keen, Robertson became the head coach of the Oklahoma Sooners wrestling program in 1947. At that time, the school had not competed in intercollegiate wrestling since 1941, and had no scholarships to offer athletes until 1949. However, in just four years, Robertson led the Sooners to their first NCAA championship in 1951. From 1947 to 1959, Robertson coached the Sooners to national championships three times (1951, 1952, and 1957), second-place finishes twice (1953 and 1956), and third-place finishes twice (1958 and 1959). After stepping down as head coach after the 1959 season, he returned in 1962 to lead the Sooners to another NCAA second-place finish. Overall, Robertson finished his coaching career with a record of 88-27-7, claiming nine conference championships and finishing undefeated four times (1951, 1952, 1953, and 1959). Fifteen of his wrestlers won individual NCAA titles, including three-time champion Dan Hodge and Olympians Dick Delgado and Bill Borders.

Robertson's philosophy on coaching wrestling at the University of Oklahoma was simple: "First of all, a boy has to want to come here to get an education. If he thinks wrestling is more important than that, he's not going to do well in either. Then he has to realize what it takes to be a good wrestler. It depends on how much of himself he wants to spend. He has to learn to know himself. Once he gets self-discipline in wrestling, he'll have it all his life."

In 1958, Robertson became president of the American Wrestling Coaches and Officials Association. He was inducted into the Helms Athletic Foundation Coaching Hall of Fame in 1960, and into the National Wrestling Hall of Fame in 1976. In 1995, he was inducted into the Oklahoma Sports Hall of Fame.

Robertson coached the freestyle wrestling team in the 1960 Summer Olympics in Rome, Italy. The American team won three gold medals in eight weight classes. Terry McCann, two-time NCAA champion from the University of Iowa, credited Robertson for him making the Olympic team that year. During a hot August workout prior to tryouts at the Olympic training camp in Norman, Oklahoma, McCann fainted and was treated at the infirmary for heat exhaustion. After deciding he would not be able to recover in time, McCann drove home to Tulsa, but Robertson insisted he return to Norman and compete. McCann arrived back in camp the following day to win two consecutive matches and earn his place on the Olympic team. McCann went on to win gold in the bantamweight division at the Olympic Games.

== Later career, retirement, and death ==
In total, Robertson spent nearly 40 years at the University of Oklahoma. Besides his fourteen-year tenure as head wrestling coach, Robertson also spent time as freshman football coach, guidance counselor, and assistant athletic director. In addition, he taught health, physical education, and recreation as an assistant professor. In his role as academic counselor for all male athletes, he insisted that they attend class and stay out of trouble; athletes who broke the athletic department rules were often forced to run stadium stairs or wash dishes in the dining hall. In more serious cases, however, Robertson was not above revoking athletic scholarships or even expelling students from the university.

Robertson was awarded the university's Distinguished Service Citation in 1976, and the OU Athletics Council Award of Merit in upon his retirement in 1985. On February 12, 2000, the University of Oklahoma dedicated the Port Robertson Wrestling Center in honor of service to the school.

Robertson died on June 10, 2003, in Norman, Oklahoma.
