= William Borders =

William Borders may refer to:

- William Holmes Borders (1905–1993), Atlanta minister and civil rights activist
- William Donald Borders (1913–2010), American prelate of the Roman Catholic Church, 13th Archbishop of Baltimore 1974–1989
- Bill Borders (1930–2022), American Olympic wrestler
