= Francisco Vicera =

Filipino wrestler

Personal information
- Nationality: Filipino
- Born: 10 August 1923

Sport
- Sport: Wrestling

Francisco Vicera (born 10 August 1923) was a Filipino wrestler. He competed in the men's freestyle bantamweight at the 1948 Summer Olympics.
