= Leonardo Basurto =

Mexican wrestler (1928–2009)

Personal information
- Born: 14 March 1928 Mexico City, Mexico
- Died: 30 September 2009 (aged 81) Columbia, Missouri, United States

Sport
- Sport: Wrestling

Leonardo Basurto (14 March 1928 – 30 September 2009) was a Mexican wrestler. He competed in the men's freestyle bantamweight at the 1952 Summer Olympics.
