= Erkki Johansson =

Finnish wrestler (1917–1984)

Personal information
- Nationality: Finnish
- Born: 27 July 1917 Vyborg, Finland
- Died: 7 October 1984 (aged 67) Lahti, Finland

Sport
- Sport: Wrestling

Erkki Johansson (27 July 1917 – 7 October 1984) was a Finnish wrestler. He competed in the men's freestyle bantamweight at the 1948 Summer Olympics.He finished fourth at the 1950 World Championships
