= Nirmal Bhose =

Indian wrestler (1926–2005)

Personal information
- Nationality: Indian
- Born: 1926
- Died: 2005 (aged 78–79)

Sport
- Sport: Wrestling

Nirmal Bhose (1926–2005) was an Indian wrestler. He competed in the men's freestyle bantamweight at the 1948 Summer Olympics.
