= Adrien Poliquin =

Canadian wrestler

Personal information
- Born: 10 April 1929 Victoriaville, Quebec, Canada
- Died: 14 June 2012 (aged 83) Richelieu, Quebec, Canada

Sport
- Sport: Wrestling

Adrien Poliquin (10 April 1929 – 14 June 2012) was a Canadian wrestler. He competed in the men's freestyle bantamweight at the 1952 Summer Olympics.
