= Walter Wenger =

Swiss wrestler

Personal information
- Nationality: Swiss

Sport
- Sport: Wrestling

Walter Wenger (20 December 1911 – 14 January 1990) was a Swiss wrestler. He competed in the men's freestyle bantamweight at the 1948 Summer Olympics.
