= Gerald Leeman =

American wrestler

Gerry Leeman
Personal information
- Nickname: "Germ"
- Born: June 22, 1922 Osage, Iowa, U.S.
- Died: October 10, 2008 (aged 86) Cedar Falls, Iowa, U.S.

Sport
- Country: United States
- Sport: Wrestling
- Events: Freestyle and Folkstyle
- College team: Iowa State Teachers College
- Team: USA
Medal record
Representing United States
Men's freestyle wrestling
Olympic Games
Silver medal – second place	1948 London	57 kg
Collegiate Wrestling
Representing Iowa State Teachers College
NCAA Championships
Gold medal – first place	1946 Stillwater	128 lb

Gerald "Gerry" Leeman (June 22, 1922 – October 10, 2008) was an American wrestler and Olympic silver medalist.

== Wrestling career ==
Leeman was the first three-time high school wrestling champion from Osage, Iowa in 1939, 1940 and 1941. He went on to wrestle in college for Iowa State Teachers College, now the University of Northern Iowa. He won the 1946 NCAA national championship at 128 pounds for Iowa State Teachers College and was named outstanding wrestler of the tournament. While at ISTC he also won 2 AAU wrestling championships.

Two years later, in 1948, Gerald wrestled at the 1948 Summer Olympics in London, England and won a silver medal for freestyle wrestling at 125.5 pounds.

After returning to the United States he briefly coached Fort Dodge High School's wrestling team in Fort Dodge, Iowa but would quickly move on to a college coaching position at Lehigh University in Bethlehem, Pennsylvania. It was while training for the Olympics, Leeman met Lehigh University wrestling coach Billy Sheridan. In 1953, Leeman replaced Sheridan as head coach and compiled a 161–38–4 record and unsurpassed 80.3 winning percentage before resigning in 1970. In his 18 years as coach he never had a losing season at Lehigh. In addition to wrestling, Leeman also coached tennis, soccer, cross-country, and track at Lehigh.

He is a member of several halls of fame, including the University of Northern Iowa Athletics Hall of Fame, the National Wrestling Hall of Fame as a Distinguished Member, and the Glen Brand Iowa Hall of Fame at the Dan Gable Wrestling Institute and Museum.

He was named one of the top fifty Iowa athletes of the 20th century by Sports Illustrated.

Lehigh's wrestling arena is now known as Leeman-Turner Arena at Grace Hall in his and Thad Turner's honor.

== Nickname ==
Leeman's nickname came from the football field.

"One of the kids said, 'He goes through those holes like a little germ.' Then the coach started calling me that," Leeman said in a December 2007 interview with The Des Moines Register.

== Personal life ==
Leeman was the second of ten children.

From 1943 to 1945 Leeman served his country as a pilot in the United States Navy during World War II. He later returned to Iowa State Teachers College to finish his bachelor's degree in 1948.

Leeman retired to Cedar Falls, Iowa, where he died of cancer on October 10, 2008, at age 86.
