= 1946 NCAA wrestling championships =

American collegiate wrestling tournament

1946 NCAA Wrestling Championships
Tournament information
- Sport: College wrestling
- Location: Stillwater, Oklahoma
- Dates: March 22, 1946–March 23, 1946
- Host(s): Oklahoma A&M
- Venue(s): Gallagher Hall

Final positions
- Champions: Oklahoma A&M (14th title)
- 1st runners-up: Iowa State Teachers College
- 2nd runners-up: Illinois
- MVP: Gerry Leeman (Iowa State Teachers College)

The 1946 NCAA Wrestling Championships were the 16th NCAA Wrestling Championships to be held. Oklahoma A&M in Stillwater, Oklahoma hosted the tournament at Gallagher Hall, March 22–23, 1946.

This was the first NCAA Wrestling Championship since 1942. The 1943, 1944, and 1945 meets were cancelled due to WWII.

Oklahoma A&M took home the team championship with 25 points and having two individual champions.

Gerry Leeman of Iowa State Teachers College was named the Outstanding Wrestler.

== Team results ==
Rank	School	Points
1	Oklahoma A&M	25
2	Iowa State Teachers College	24
3	Illinois	17
4	Indiana	13
5	Michigan	8
6	Ohio State	7
7	Iowa State College	6
8	Michigan State	5
T-9	Penn State	2
T-9	Northern Colorado	2
T-9	Nebraska	2

== Individual finals ==
Weight class	Championship match (champion in boldface)
121 lbs	**Cecil Mott**, Iowa State Teachers College DEC Mike Rolak, Indiana, 6–3
128 lbs	**Gerry Leeman**, Iowa State Teachers College DEC Lou Kachiroubas, Illinois, 6–2
136 lbs	**David Arndt**, Oklahoma A&M MAJOR Russ Bush, Iowa State Teachers College, 10–1
145 lbs	**Bill Koll**, Iowa State Teachers College DEC Edgar Welch, Oklahoma A&M, 7–2
155 lbs	**Bill Courtright**, Michigan DEC Jack St. Clair, Oklahoma A&M, 4–3
165 lbs	**David Shapiro**, Illinois MAJOR George Walker, Oklahoma A&M, 15–6
175 lbs	**George Dorsch**, Oklahoma A&M DEC Norman Anthonisen, Illinois, 6–0
UNL	**George Bollos**, Ohio State WBF Morris Chittwood, Indiana, 14:11
