= Rashid Mammadbeyov =

Azerbaijani wrestler (1927–1970)

Personal information
- Born: Rashid Garabey oglu Mammadbeyov; 28 February 1927 Şağan, Baku, Azerbaijan SSR, Soviet Union
- Died: 4 December 1970 (aged 43) Baku, Azerbaijan SSR, Soviet Union
- Education: Azerbaijan State Institute of Physical Education

Sport
- Sport: Freestyle wrestling
- Club: Iskra, Baku
- Coached by: Rza Bakhshaliyev
Medal record
Representing the Soviet Union
Olympic Games
Silver medal – second place	1952 Helsinki	57 kg
USSR Championship
Silver medal – second place	1947 Tallinn	57 kg
Silver medal – second place	1949 Baku	57 kg
Silver medal – second place	1953 Tbilisi	57 kg
Silver medal – second place	1954 Leningrad	57 kg
USSR Spartakiad
Silver medal – second place	1956 Moscow	57 kg

Rashid Garabey oglu Mammadbeyov (Azerbaijani: Rəşid Məmmədbəyov, Russian: Рашид Мамедбеков; 28 February 1927 – 4 December 1970) was a bantamweight freestyle wrestler. He became the first Olympic medalist of Azerbaijani origin when he won the freestyle wrestling silver medal at the 1952 Summer Olympic Games.

== Life ==
Mammadbeyov was coached by Rza Bakhshaliyev, silver medalist of the 1928 All-Union Spartakiad, the first ethnic Azeri in the Soviet Union to carry the title of the master of sport and founder of the school of professional wrestling in Azerbaijan.

Mammadbeyov debuted in 1947 as part of the Burevestnik team of Baku in the USSR Wrestling Championship held in Tallinn, where he was placed second. He participated in 1949 championship which was held in his hometown and again finished with a silver medal. In the following years, Mammadbeyov twice took part in the USSR Wrestling Championships, in 1953 and 1954, and once in the 1956 Summer Spartakiad of the Peoples of the USSR in 1956, in all of which he earned silver medals.

Mammadbeyov died in 1970, at the age of 43. Since 2009, an annual wrestling tournament has been held in Azerbaijan in his memory.

== 1952 Summer Olympics ==
Azerbaijani athletes began participating in the Olympic Games in 1952, at the same time as all other Soviet athletes, as part of a single team. The wrestling events took place between 20 and 23 July at the Töölö Sports Hall. In his weight category of under 57 kg, Mammadbeyov beat Mohammad Mehdi Yaghoubi of Iran, bronze medal winner of the 1951 World Wrestling Championships, in just 32 seconds. Mammadbeyov was declared the winner of the round of 32, as his Swiss opponent Paul Hänni did not show up on the ring due to an injury. Mammadbeyov's next match with Bill Borders of the United States ended in 10 minutes and 40 seconds with Mammadbeyov's flawless victory. By the end of the round of 16, Mammadbeyov was the only athlete in this category without any penalty points. In the quarterfinals, however, he lost to the Hungarian Lajos Bence 2–1, however due to the fact that Bence had five penalty points, he was disqualified and Mammadbeyov advanced to the semifinals. He beat Khashaba Dadasaheb Jadhav from India, but lost to Shohachi Ishii from Japan in the final, thus earning a silver medal.
