= Iowa–Penn State wrestling rivalry =

College sports rivalry

- Sport: Wrestling
- Teams: Iowa Hawkeyes; Penn State Nittany Lions
- First meeting: 1982; Iowa 34, Penn State 9
- Latest meeting: January 16, 2026; Penn State 32, Iowa 3

Statistics
- Total meetings: 44
- All-time series: Iowa 28–15–2
- Largest victory: Iowa, 36–3 (1990)
- Longest win streak: Iowa, 8 (1998–2005)
- Current win streak: Penn State, 5 (2022–present)

The Iowa–Penn State wrestling rivalry is an American collegiate wrestling rivalry between the Iowa Hawkeyes and the Penn State Nittany Lions. The two programs are some of the most successful in the history of NCAA Division I wrestling. The Hawkeyes and Nittany Lions have the second- and third-most team national championships, with 24 and 13 respectively, only trailing Oklahoma State's 34 titles. The series ascended to the national stage in the past decade with Penn State's rise to the top of the wrestling world, as they won 12 of 14 team titles during the 2010s and 2020s. Fellow Big Ten schools Iowa and Ohio State were the only other teams to win during those decades.

The rivalry began in 1982 and has been wrestled annually. It was amplified when Penn State joined the Big Ten Conference in 1993. It has been described as "the nation’s fiercest wrestling rivalry", and has resulted in sold out venues due to the popularity of dual meets. While the Hawkeyes dominated the early stages of the rivalry—the 1988 contest would be the first and only loss for Iowa at home during the Dan Gable Era—the Nittany Lions have since returned the favor by taking 7 of the last 10 contests. Since 2008, the rivalry has consistently been a top 10 matchup.

The 2020 contest between #1 Iowa and #2 Penn State became the most-watched wrestling telecast in the history of the Big Ten Network, drawing 342,955 viewers. The Hawkeyes prevailed over the Nittany Lions by a score of 19 to 17 in the most highly anticipated contest in the rivalry's history.

== Match results ==
The following is a complete list of match results, through the 2023-24 season.

Penn State victories	Iowa victories	Tie games

No.	Date	Location	Winner	Score
1	1982	State College, PA	Iowa	34–9
2	1984	Iowa City, IA	Iowa	26–19
3	1984	State College, PA	Iowa	31–9
4	1986	Iowa City, IA	Iowa	35–5
5	1986	State College, PA	Penn State	27–15
6	1988	Iowa City, IA	Penn State	19–18
7	1988	State College, PA	Penn State	18–16
8	1990	National Duals	Iowa	22–5
9	1990	Iowa City, IA	Iowa	36–3
10	1990	State College, PA	Iowa	32–6
11	1991	National Duals	Tie	19–19
12	1992	Iowa City, IA	Iowa	30–11
13	1992	State College, PA	Tie	18–18
14	1994	Iowa City, IA	Iowa	29–15
15	1994	National Duals	Iowa	24–15
16	1994	State College, PA	Iowa	33–6
17	1996	Iowa City, IA	Iowa	28–6
18	1996	State College, PA	Iowa	22–15
19	1998	Iowa City, IA	Penn State	25–17
20	1998	Iowa City, IA	Iowa	23–9
21	1999	State College, PA	Iowa	30–9
22	2000	Iowa City, IA	Iowa	22–9
23	2001	State College, PA	Iowa	33–10

No.	Date	Location	Winner	Score
24	2002	Iowa City, IA	Iowa	24–11
25	2003	State College, PA	Iowa	26–10
26	2004	Iowa City, IA	Iowa	23–11
27	2005	State College, PA	Iowa	23–16
28	2006	Iowa City, IA	Penn State	21–12
29	2007	State College, PA	Penn State	24–13
30	2008	Iowa City, IA	#1 Iowa	27–13
31	2009	State College, PA	#1 Iowa	31–6
32	2010	Iowa City, IA	#1 Iowa	29–6
33	2011	State College, PA	#8 Iowa	22–13
34	2012	State College, PA	#3 Penn State	22–12
35	2013	Iowa City, IA	#3 Iowa	22–16
36	2014	Iowa City, IA	#1 Penn State	24–12
37	2015	State College, PA	#1 Iowa	18–12
38	2017	Iowa City, IA	#2 Penn State	26–11
39	2018	State College, PA	#1 Penn State	28–13
40	2020	Iowa City, IA	#1 Iowa	19–17
41	2022	Iowa City, IA	#1 Penn State	19–13
42	2023	State College, PA	#1 Penn State	23–14
43	2024	Iowa City, IA	#1 Penn State	29–6
44	2025	State College, PA	#1 Penn State	30–8
45	2026	Iowa City, IA	#1 Penn State	32–3
Series: Iowa leads 28–15–2
