= Fabio Santamaria =

Cuban wrestler (1925–2000)

Personal information
- Full name: Pablo Juan Santamaría Sotomayor
- Born: 14 July 1925 Havana, Cuba
- Died: 13 July 2000 (aged 74) Puerto Rico

Sport
- Sport: Wrestling

Fabio Santamaria Sotomayor (14 July 1925 – 13 July 2000) was a Cuban wrestler. He competed in the men's freestyle bantamweight at the 1948 Summer Olympics.
