= Norman May (wrestler) =

Canadian wrestler (1917–1993)

Personal information
- Nationality: Canadian
- Born: 19 May 1917
- Died: 28 June 1993 (aged 75–76) Toronto, Ontario, Canada

Sport
- Sport: Wrestling

Norman Elmer May (19 May 1917 – 28 June 1993) was a Canadian wrestler. He competed in the men's freestyle bantamweight at the 1948 Summer Olympics.
