= 1953 NCAA wrestling championships =

American collegiate wrestling tournament

1953 NCAA Wrestling Championships
Tournament information
- Sport: College wrestling
- Location: State College, Pennsylvania
- Dates: March 28, 1953–March 29, 1953
- Host(s): Penn State University
- Venue(s): Rec Hall

Final positions
- Champions: Penn State (1st title)
- 1st runners-up: Oklahoma
- 2nd runners-up: Cornell University
- MVP: Frank Bettucci (Cornell University)

The 1953 NCAA Wrestling Championships were the 23rd NCAA Wrestling Championships to be held. Penn State University in State College, Pennsylvania hosted the tournament at Rec Hall.

Penn State took home the team championship with 21 points and having one individual champion.

Frank Bettucci of Cornell University was named the Most Outstanding Wrestler.

== Team results ==
Rank	School	Points
1	Penn State	21
2	Oklahoma	15
3	Cornell University	13
T-4	Oklahoma A&M	11
T-4	Iowa State Teachers College	11
6	Pittsburgh	9
7	Michigan	8
T-8	Minnesota	7
T-8	Michigan State	7
T-10	Lock Haven	6
T-10	Illinois	6
T-10	Colorado State	6
T-10	Auburn	6

== Individual finals ==
Weight class	Championship match (champion in boldface)
115 lbs	**Hugh Peery**, Pittsburgh DEC Bob Christensen, Northwestern, 5–1
123 lbs	**Dick Mueller**, Minnesota WBF Donald Reece, Oklahoma, 4:45
130 lbs	**Norvard Nalan**, Michigan DEC Dick Lemyre, Penn State, 7–5
137 lbs	**Len DeAugustino**, Lock Haven DEC Norton Compton, Illinois, 3–1
147 lbs	**Frank Bettucci**, Cornell University DEC Bob Hoke, Michigan State, 6–3
157 lbs	**Jim Harmon**, Iowa State Teachers College DEC Dan Sniff, Colorado State, 6–4
167 lbs	**Don Dickason**, Cornell University RD Frank Marks, Oklahoma, 1–1
177 lbs	**Ned Blass**, Oklahoma A&M DEC Al Paulekas, Army, 8–4
191 lbs	**Hud Samson**, Penn State WBF Charles Weber, West Chester, 4:15
UNL	**Dan McNair**, Auburn RD Gene Nicks, Oklahoma A&M, 0–0
