= Cemil Sarıbacak =

Turkish wrestler (born 1927)

Personal information
- Nationality: Turkish
- Born: 1927

Sport
- Sport: Wrestling

Cemil Sarıbacak (born 1927) was a Turkish wrestler. He competed in the men's freestyle bantamweight at the 1952 Summer Olympics.
