= Jeff Prescott =

American amateur wrestler (born 1969)

Medal record

Men's freestyle wrestling

Representing the United States

Pan American Championships
Silver medal – second place	2002 Maracaibo	55 kg

Collegiate Wrestling

Representing the Penn State Nittany Lions

NCAA Division I Championships
Gold medal – first place	1991 Iowa City	118 lb
Gold medal – first place	1992 Oklahoma City	118 lb

Jeff Prescott (born 1969) was an American wrestler, who won two NCAA championships at Penn State University and was the first Penn State wrestler to win Most Outstanding Wrestler of the NCAA tournament. He currently runs his own training center in Limestone, New York, and serves as a coach and mentor to youth and high school wrestlers in the Western New York and North East Pennsylvania areas.

== Wrestling career ==
Prescott was a three-time New York state champion while wrestling for Olean High School in Olean, New York. He was also voted MOW of the NYSPHSAA tournament,a USA High School All-American, and held the record for most wins in New York from 1986 to 2000. He wrestled collegiately at Penn State, where he was a two-time NCAA Division I national champion, a University Freestyle national champion, and Most Outstanding Wrestler at the NCAA tournament.

In 2007, Prescott was inducted into the EWL Hall-of-Fame in Cleveland, Ohio.

== Coaching ==
Prescott coached the Jupiter Christian School wrestling team in Jupiter, Florida to a state championship in 2006. Prescott was a wrestling coach at Jupiter Christian School when it was fined by the Florida High School Athletic Association (FHSAA) for illegal performance enhancing drug use by its wrestling team. He currently runs and coaches his own school in Buffalo, New York.

== Real Pro Wrestling ==
Prescott was affiliated with the short-lived professional wrestling league, Real Pro Wrestling, on the NY Outrage Team. Prescott has also produced a line of wrestling education DVDs.

== Awards ==
- Section 6 4x Champion (NY) (1984, 1985, 1986, 1987)
- NYS 3x State Champion (1985, 1986, 1987)
- NYS MOW (1986)
- USA High School All American
- 3x NCAA All American (1990, 1991, 1992)
- 2x NCAA DI Champion (1991, 1992)
- NCAA DI MOW (1991)
- University Freestyle Champion (1991)
- EWL Hall of Fame Inductee (2007)
