= Eigil Johansen =

Danish wrestler

Personal information
- Nationality: Danish
- Born: 28 September 1915 Copenhagen, Denmark
- Died: 29 July 1998 (aged 82)

Sport
- Sport: Wrestling

Eigil Johansen (28 September 1915 – 29 July 1998) was a Danish wrestler. He was born in Copenhagen, Denmark. He competed in the men's freestyle bantamweight at the 1952 Summer Olympics. His father, Gotfred Johansen, was an amateur boxer, who won silver medals at the 1920 Olympics.
