= Rohan Murphy =

American Paralympian (b.1983)

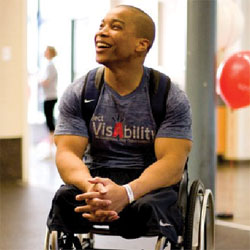
- Rohan Murphy speaking in 2013

Personal information
- Born: December 22, 1983 (age 42) Jamaica, New York, U.S.
- Weight: 56 kg (123 lb; 8.8 st)

Sport
- Country: United States
- Sport: Wrestling and Weightlifting
- College team: Penn State
Medal record
Men's athletics
Representing the United States
IPC World Powerlifting Championships
| Bronze medal – third place | 2006 Busan | 56 kg |

Rohan Mario Murphy (born December 22, 1983) is an American Paralympian, wrestler and motivational speaker. Murphy is also the founder of inspirational networking community CatchSpark.com, and a 2011 candidate for The Leukemia & Lymphoma Society's Man & Woman of the Year fundraising campaign. Murphy has been featured in media such as ABC News, Sports Illustrated and 20/20, as well as Nike's “No Excuses” campaign.

== Wrestling career ==
During his early years, Murphy was unable and unwilling to participate in sports due to his physical disability. However, when he was in the eighth grade, East Islip coach Ron Croteau offered Murphy a position as equipment manager for the soccer, wrestling and tennis teams.

After noticing both Murphy’s dedication as manager and upper-body strength during gym class, Croteau suggested that Murphy begin wrestling. Murphy and Croteau spent the entire summer training, and Murphy joined the East Islip wrestling team in ninth grade. Murphy wrestled his first match in December 1997 at the Sayville Holiday Tournament. Although he lost his first match and several thereafter, Murphy began to train harder and dedicated himself completely to wrestling. He ended up becoming one of the most decorated wrestlers in East Islip Redmen history by finishing his career as a three-time All-League and two-time All-County wrestler. Murphy walked on to wrestle at Penn State for coach Troy Sunderland. He earned three varsity letters while at Penn State.

== Paralympic career ==
During his time at Penn State, Murphy began participating in Paralympic weightlifting events. In May 2006, Murphy won a Bronze medal in the 56 kg Junior Division of the 2006 IPC World Powerlifting Championships in Busan, South Korea. Murphy lifted 281.1 pounds (127.5 kg), breaking the previous U.S. Paralympic record of 270 pounds for the 56 kg division, which he set earlier that year at the Southeast Regional. Murphy’s feat grabbed the attention of Nike, and Murphy was subsequently featured in Nike’s “No Excuses” campaign. “No Excuses” was a New Year’s campaign that sought to motivate people to create a workout plan and stick to it.

== Current ==
Murphy is now a professional motivational speaker. He speaks on a wide variety of subjects, most notably overcoming adversity and accepting differences. He also teaches Krankcycle classes at Gold's Gym in Islip, New York.
