= Charles Kouyos =

French wrestler (1928–1994)

Personal information
- Nationality: French
- Born: 10 February 1928 Marseille
- Died: 12 December 1994 (aged 66)

Sport
- Sport: Wrestling
Medal record
Men's freestyle wrestling
Representing France
Olympic Games
Bronze medal – third place	1948 London	Bantamweight

Charles Kouyos (10 February 1928 – 12 December 1994) was a French sport wrestler. He was born in Marseille. He won a bronze medal in freestyle wrestling, bantamweight class, at the 1948 Summer Olympics in London.
