= Shohachi Ishii =

Japanese wrestler (1926–1980)

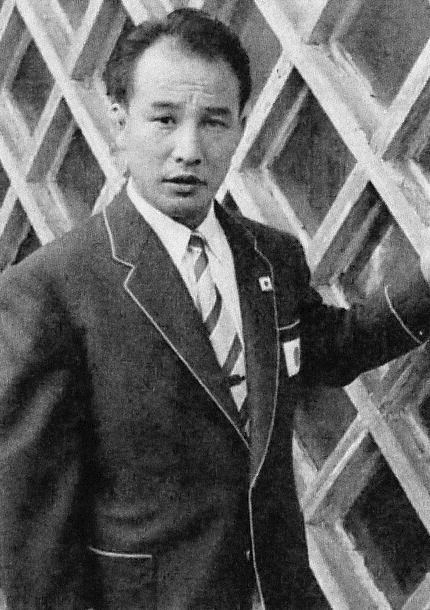
- Shohachi Ishii in 1956

Personal information
- Born: September 20, 1926 Tokyo, Japan
- Died: January 4, 1980 (aged 53) Ichikawa, Chiba, Japan
- Education: Chuo University

Sport
- Sport: Freestyle wrestling
Medal record
Men's freestyle wrestling
Representing Japan
Olympic Games
Gold medal – first place	1952 Helsinki	Bantamweight

Shohachi Ishii (石井 庄八, Ishii Shōhachi; September 20, 1926 – January 4, 1980) was a Japanese freestyle wrestler who won a gold medal at the 1952 Summer Olympics. He was the first Japanese gold medalist after World War II, the only Japanese gold medalist at the 1952 Olympics, and one of two Japanese medalists in wrestling at the 1952 Olympics, the other being flyweight Yushu Kitano, who won silver in freestyle.

Ishii took up wrestling because there was no judo club around. He died of kidney cancer, aged 53.
