= Bill Koll =

American wrestler and coach (1923–2003)

Personal information
- Full name: William H. Koll
- Born: August 12, 1923 Fort Dodge, Iowa, U.S.
- Died: September 27, 2003 (aged 80) State College, Pennsylvania, U.S.

Sport
- Country: United States
- Sport: Wrestling
- Events: Freestyle and Folkstyle
- College team: Iowa State Teachers College
- Team: USA
Medal record
Collegiate Wrestling
Representing Iowa State Teachers College
NCAA Championships
Gold medal – first place	1946 Stillwater	145 lb
Gold medal – first place	1947 Champaign	145 lb
Gold medal – first place	1948 Bethlehem	147 lb

William H. Koll (August 12, 1923 – September 27, 2003) was an American wrestler and coach.

== Biography ==
Born in Fort Dodge, Iowa in 1923, Koll was a wrestler at Iowa State Teachers College (now the University of Northern Iowa) and later became a head wrestling coach, most notably at his collegiate alma mater and for the Penn State Nittany Lions wrestling team. As a wrestler, Koll was undefeated (72–0) and won three straight NCAA Championships (1946–1948). He was twice voted the most outstanding wrestler at the national tournament, the first wrestler to achieve this honor.

Koll's college career was interrupted by World War II, during which he served and participated in the Normandy landings and earned a Bronze Star. Koll competed for the U.S. at the 1948 Summer Olympics in London and placed fifth in the freestyle wrestling competition.

Koll returned to Iowa State Teachers College in 1945 to continue his education and embark on a career in wrestling and coaching. He became head wrestling coach in 1953 and continued until 1964. During his 11 seasons at the helm, he guided the Panthers to a 71-42-6 record (.622).

As a professor of Health and Physical Education and coach, Koll led Penn State for 14 seasons (1965–1979), which included unbeaten dual meet campaigns in 1967, 1970, 1971, 1972 and 1974.

Koll is a member of the National Wrestling Hall of Fame and the father of Rob Koll, a collegiate wrestling head coach and NCAA champion at the University of North Carolina at Chapel Hill. Koll died in 2003 in State College, Pennsylvania at the age of 80.

== See also ==
- List of Pennsylvania State University Olympians
