= Erik Persson (wrestler) =

Swedish wrestler (1914–1969)

Personal information
- Nationality: Swedish
- Born: 25 April 1914 Malmö, Sweden
- Died: 24 September 1969 (aged 55) Stockholm, Sweden

Sport
- Sport: Wrestling

Erik Persson (25 April 1914 – 24 September 1969) was a Swedish wrestler. He competed in the men's freestyle bantamweight at the 1948 Summer Olympics.
