= Penn State Nittany Lions wrestling =

Wrestling team of Penn State University

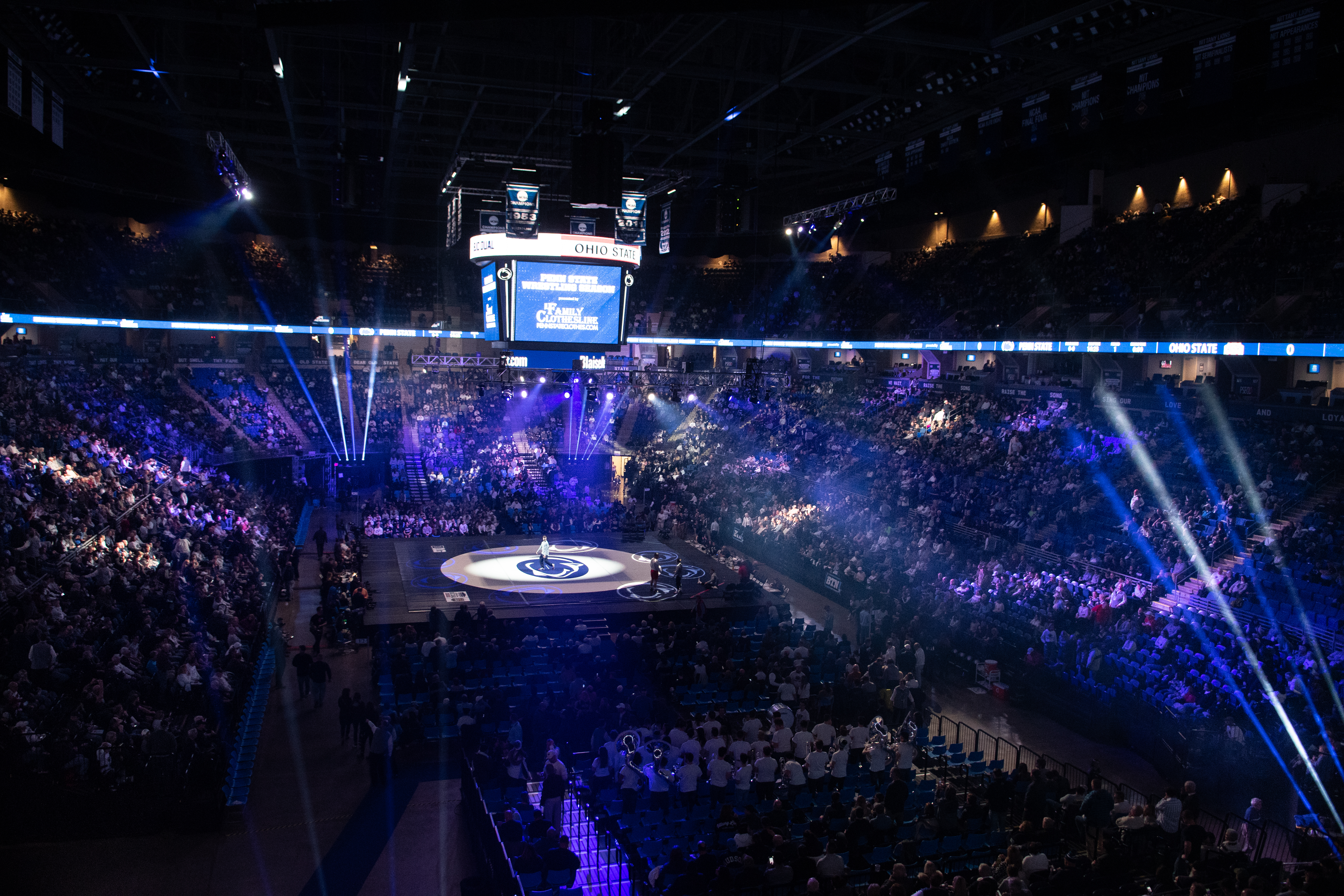
- Penn State Wrestling's match against Ohio State at Bryce Jordan Center in February 2020
- Founded: 1909; 117 years ago
- University: Pennsylvania State University
- Head coach: Cael Sanderson (15th season)
- Assistant coach: Casey Cunningham; Cody Sanderson; Nick Lee
- Conference: Big Ten Conference
- Location: University Park, PA
- Arena: Bryce Jordan Center (capacity: 15,261)
- Nickname: Nittany Lions
- Colors: Blue and white
- Fight song: Fight On, State

Team national championships
- 15

National championship years
- 1921, 1953, 2011, 2012, 2013, 2014, 2016, 2017, 2018, 2019, 2022, 2023, 2024, 2025, 2026

NCAA individual champions
- 65

All-Americans
- 267

Conference Tournament championships
- EIWA: 1918, 1919, 1920, 1921, 1924, 1925, 1936, 1937, 1942, 1951, 1952, 1953, 1957, 1960, 1971, 1973 EWL: 1976, 1977, 1978, 1982, 1983, 1984, 1985, 1986, 1987, 1988, 1989, 1990, 1991, 1992 Big Ten: 2011, 2012, 2013, 2014, 2016, 2019, 2023, 2024, 2025, 2026

The Penn State Nittany Lions Wrestling program is the collegiate wrestling team at Pennsylvania State University. The team is a member of the Big Ten Conference and the National Collegiate Athletic Association (NCAA). The Nittany Lions compete at Bryce Jordan Center, a 15,261 capacity indoor stadium on the university's campus. Since the program's founding in 1909, the team has claimed 15 team National Championship titles and 65 individual NCAA National Championship titles, making it one of the most successful collegiate wrestling programs in the nation.

Former wrestlers include Dan Hodge Trophy Winners Kerry McCoy (1997), Zain Retherford (2017, 2018), Bo Nickal (2019), Aaron Brooks (2024), and Olympic Champion David Taylor (2012, 2014).

== History ==
=== Founding ===
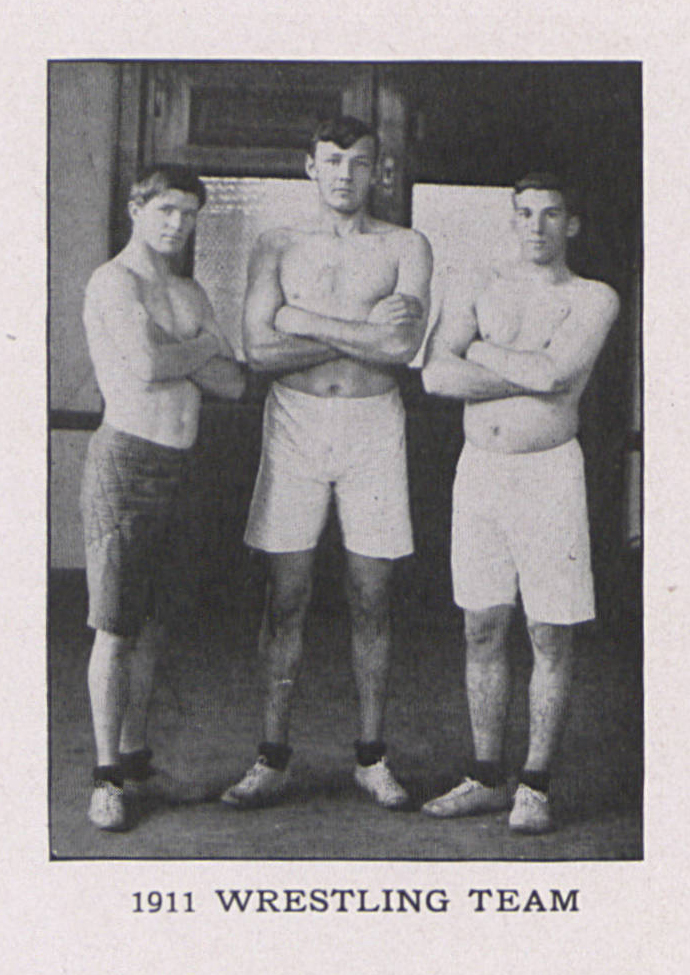
The 1911 Penn State wrestling team

Penn State's collegiate wrestling program was founded in 1902, and was initially limited to intra-class dual matches. Two years later, following the formation of the Eastern Intercollegiate Wrestling Association in 1904, a wrestling club was founded at Penn State in 1908, which aimed to represent the college in formal competition.

The Penn State Wrestling Club arranged two intercollegiate dual meets in the Fall of 1908 with Lehigh and Cornell. The club had to do so independently of the College Athletic Association as wrestling was not yet a recognized sport in the organization. The first dual was cancelled, but the second held on March 27, 1909, at Cornell went forward seeing Penn State fall 6–1 in their first ever, with each team receiving one point for each bout winner. The program grew and thrived over the next few decades, producing numerous talented wrestlers and successful teams.

One of the program's early stars was William Neidig, who wrestled on Penn State's first undefeated team in 1911 when the team went 4–0 against Lehigh, Yale, Columbia, and Cornell. Levi Lamb, another notable Penn State wrestler of this era, was a three-sport athlete at Penn State who excelled in wrestling, football, and track, Lamb only lost two bouts in his four-year Penn State career with 70% of his victories coming from pins. Lamb went on to coach wrestling at Boston Tech before enlisting in the U.S. Army to serve in World War I.

=== Eastern Intercollegiate Wrestling Association ===
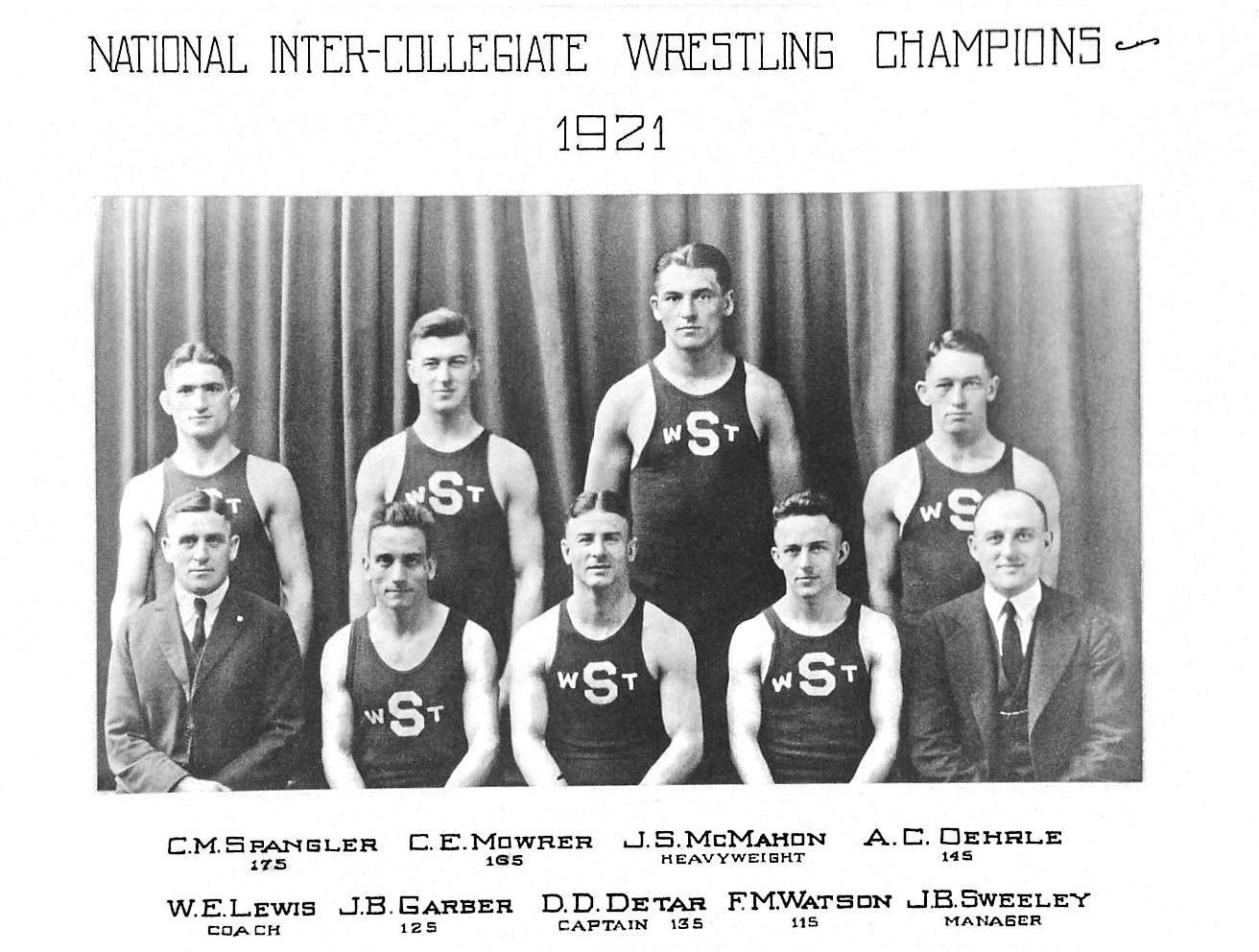
Penn State's 1921 wrestling team, which won the national championship

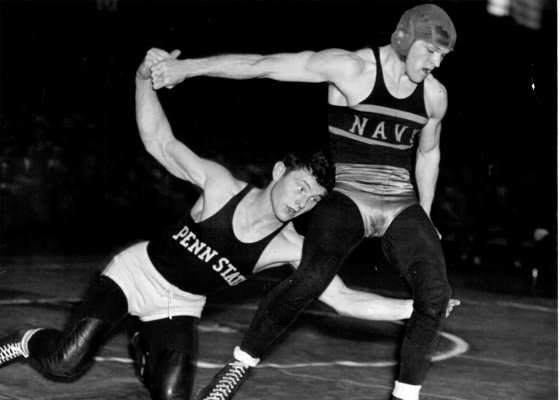
Penn State's Bill Santel wrestling Navy's Bart Downes in Annapolis, Maryland in February 1949

After eight years of applying for membership, Penn State was granted entrance into the Eastern Intercollegiate Wrestling Association (EIWA) in 1918. This made the team eligible to compete for intercollegiate championships. Penn State claimed its first EIWA title that same year, beginning a streak of six title wins in eight seasons.

In 1921, Penn State embarked on a difficult eight-event schedule that included dual meets with four EIWA programs and trips to face two top teams in the Midwest in Indiana and Iowa State. The Nittany Lions claimed their fourth straight EIWA title at the league tournament hosted at Princeton. That win, coupled with the later inter-conference dual wins against Indiana and Iowa, resulted in Penn State's first national championship title.

Penn State wrestling broke onto the world stage in 1924 when Katsutoshi Naito competed in the 1924 Summer Olympics. Naito, a Japanese born immigrant, was team captain his senior season and claimed an EIWA championship at 135 pounds. While Naito was one of the best wrestlers in his weight class and expressed his interest in representing the United States in the competition due to the passage of the Immigration Act of 1924 he was banned from representing the country in international competitions. This led the Japanese Olympic Committee to extend an invitation to Naito to compete in Freestyle wrestling in the featherweight class. Naito won his first match against Belgium's Albert Foubert before facing and losing by decision to eventual gold medalist Robin Reed of the United States. Naito recovered and went on to win the bronze medal by defeating Sweden's Hans Hansson. Naito's win marked Japan's first ever Olympic medal in wrestling and 3rd overall.

After undergoing five coaching changes, the Nittany Lions found their long-term coach in Charlie "Doc" Speidel. The Panzer College graduate and skilled boxer in the Golden Gloves, was hired by the Nittany Lions in 1927 as the university's boxing and wrestling coach. Although he never engaged in competitive wrestling himself, he took on the role with enthusiasm and dedication. Under Speidel's leadership, the team quickly gained recognition, with Howard Johnston earning Penn State's first All-American title in 1935 at 165 pounds. Speidel also played a key role in establishing the National Wrestling Coaches Association in 1930 and organizing the first PIAA State Championships in 1938.

Penn State's history with the NCAA Wrestling Championships began when Ted Wilson was crowned EIWA champion at 125 pounds in 1929 making him the first Nittany Lion to be invited to the post season tournament. Wilson would fall in the first round to Iowa State's Richard Cole. The following year, Penn State was selected to host the 1930 NCAA Wrestling Championships which took place at Rec Hall. Four Nittany Lion wrestlers were entered to the tournament in Roy Maize at 115 pounds, Grant Stein at 135 pounds, Karl Kaiser at 145 pounds and Paul Long at 175 pounds.

The inclusion of Chuck Hall on the Nittany Lion's 1940s wrestling teams broke barriers across college athletics. Hall was the first blind Division 1 collegiate wrestler to record a fall when he took down his opponent in a bout against Temple. Hall wrestled in high school and was the team captain at Philadelphia's Overbrook School for the Blind. Teammate and fraternity brother Charlie Ridenour was instrumental in developing Hall's wrestling ability while at Penn State. Hall's father was a member of the 1909 wrestling club team that debuted the sport at the university.

=== First NCAA National Championship and Eastern Wrestling League ===
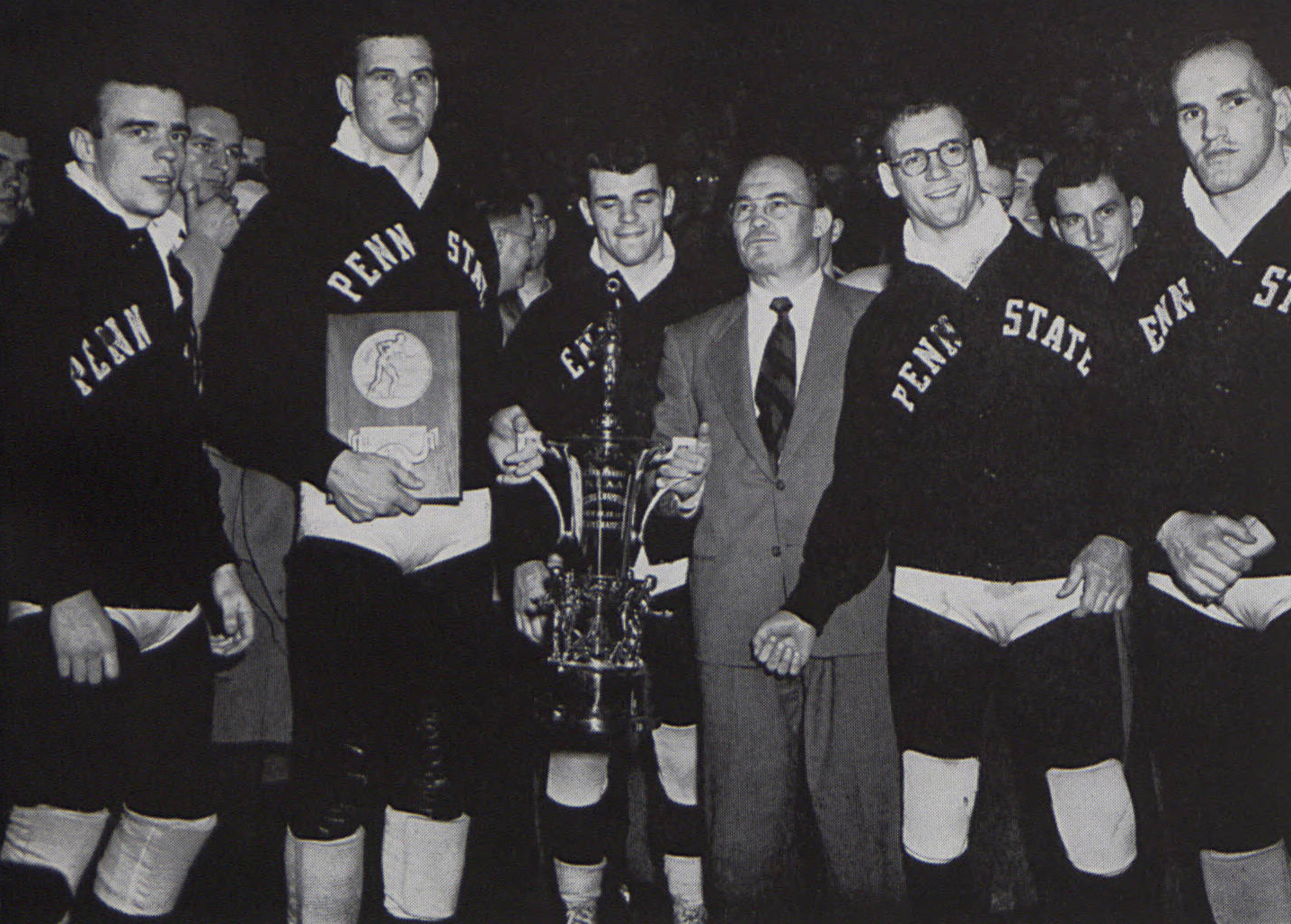
The Penn State wrestling team poses with the NCAA National Championship trophy in 1953

In 1953, Penn State's wrestling team enjoyed one of its most successful seasons to date, winning matches against Virginia, Lehigh, Navy, Penn, Syracuse, Cornell, Maryland, and Pitt, with the latter breaking Pitt's 16-match win streak. The team went on to win the EIWA Tournament before clinching their first NCAA wrestling championship becoming the first team from the Eastern United States to do so. The team boasted nine wrestlers, five of whom became All-Americans, with Hud Samson achieving an individual national championship. This win was particularly significant as it ended the 19-year dominance of Oklahoma and Oklahoma A&M in the sport.

Penn State wrestling underwent a significant transition with the retirement of longtime coach Charlie Speidel in 1964. Under Speidel's 34 year leadership Penn State recorded a record of 191–56–13, winning the university's first team national championship in 1953, achieving eight EIWA team titles, producing six individual NCAA champs, 15 national finalists, and 41 All-Americans. Speidel was replaced by Bill Koll who was one of the country's most successful collegiate wrestlers and a notable coach.

After competing in the EIWA for 58 years, Penn State left the conference in 1975 and competed independently for one season. During that year, the team earned a spot in the NCAAs through the Eastern Regional Independent tournament. In 1976, the team became a charter member of the newly formed Eastern Wrestling League (EWL), which was the brainchild of several individuals, including Ed Czekai, Penn State's Athletic Director, Frank Lignelli, Clarion's Athletic Director, and Walt Cummins, Pitt's Athletic Director. The EWL had six original members: Penn State, Pitt, Clarion, Lock Haven, Bloomsburg, and Buffalo. Additional members, West Virginia, Cleveland State, Millersville, and Edinboro, were added later.

Penn State wrestling had its worst performance in program history during the 1978–1979 season. Despite having achieved an average of ten wins per year and three top-10 finishes in the NCAA tournament over the preceding five years, the team experienced a rapid decline in performance due to academic ineligibility and injuries. Despite first-year coach Rich Lorenzo's optimism, the team failed to reverse their fate, ultimately suffering 11 consecutive losses and finishing the season with a 2–11 record. Despite the disastrous start, Lorenzo's leadership and personality proved to be essential to Penn State's eventual resurgence during the 1980–81 season, leading them to a sixth-place finish in the NCAA tournament.

Considered one of Penn State wrestling's most notable seasons during its first century, the 1986-87 campaign was highlighted by several key achievements. The team secured the program's first victory over Iowa with a 27–15 final score, and also recorded a convincing regular season triumph over Oklahoma by 30–8. The Nittany Lions ended the season with a dual record of 18–1–1, clinching the EWL title and finishing in third place at the NCAA championships. Despite falling short of individual NCAA titles, the team earned a notable eight All-American honors, the most in its history up to that point. Additionally, the squad broke Penn State's record for most dual victories in a season, and shared the National Duals championship with Oklahoma State. During the 1988 season Penn State would defeat the Iowa Hawkeyes 19–18 at Carver-Hawkeye Arena on December 6. This would be the first and only time Iowa would lose a home dual under legendary coach Dan Gable.

=== Early Big Ten Era ===
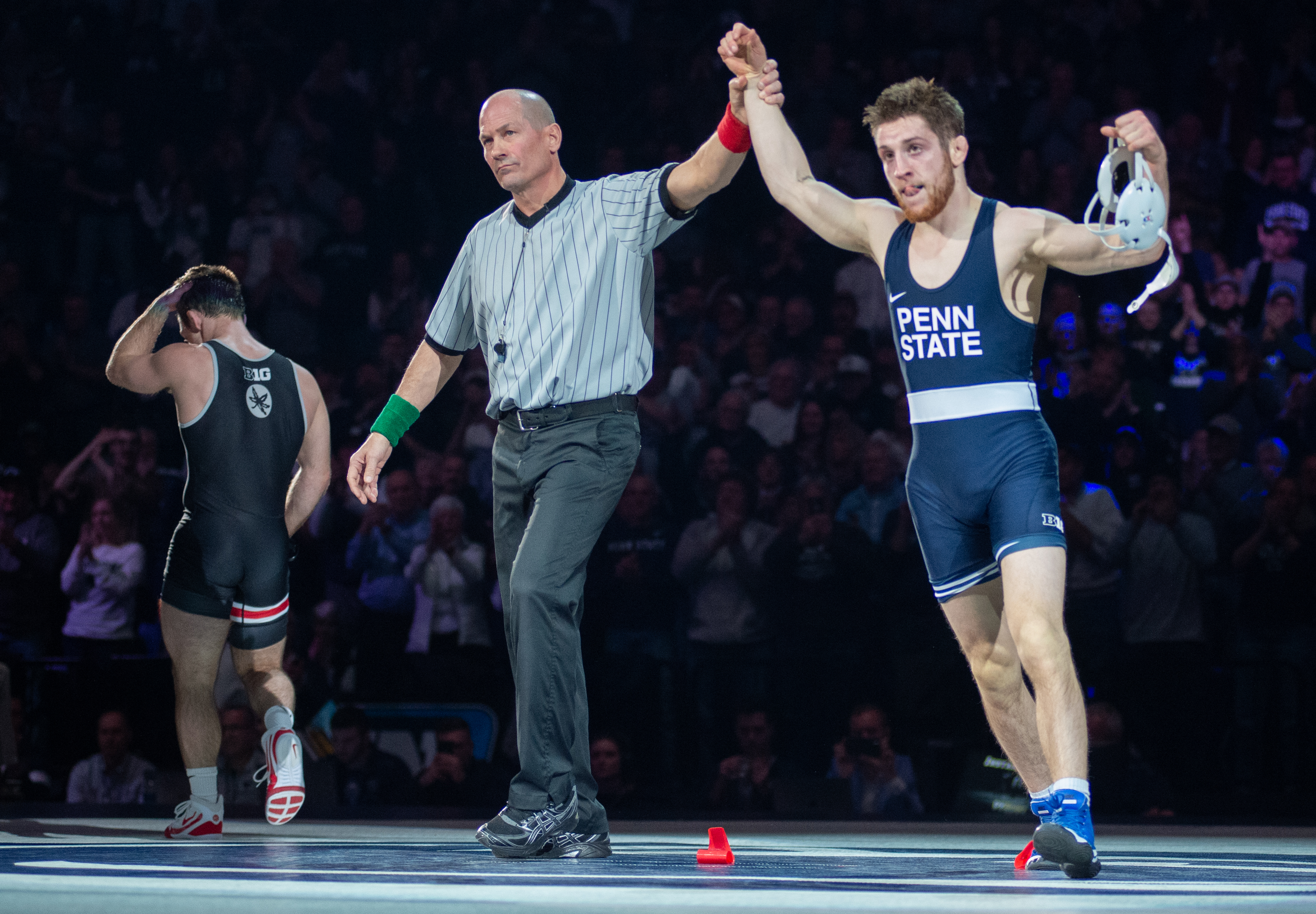
Penn State's Nick Lee wrestling Ohio State in February 2020

The 1990s marked a period of change and close calls for Penn State wrestling. Over the course of the decade, the team achieved a record of 149 wins, 56 losses, and 4 ties. The Lions performed well in the NCAA Division I tournament, finishing in the top five a total of eight times, including one 2nd-place finish and three 3rd places. In addition, the team boasted five national champions, who won a total of seven titles, as well as 13 individual EWL championships and 14 individual Big 10 championships. Despite consistently being a top contender, the team fell just short of winning the national or Big Ten Conference championship.

The wrestling program saw several changes during the 1990s. Penn State joined the Big Ten Conference on June 4, 1990, becoming the conference's 11th member. Long term head coach Rich Lorenzo retired in 1992 compiling a 188-64-9 record and coached 53 All-Americans. Lorenzo was succeeded by John Fritz, who was later replaced by former wrestler Troy Sunderland. The team also had several standout wrestlers, including Kerry McCoy, Cary Kolat, and Troy Sunderland.

Penn State hit a slump under head coach Troy Sunderland, through the 2000s the team had only achieved two top-five finish in his 11-year tenure, and had even placed as low as 35th. After recording a lackluster record of 8-12-2 in the dual season and placed 17th at the 2009 NCAA Championships the university decided to part ways with Sunderland.

=== Cael Sanderson Era ===
In April 2009, Cael Sanderson, one of the most distinguished American wrestlers, accepted the head coaching position with Penn State wrestling. As a college wrestler, Sanderson had a perfect 159–0 record and won four NCAA titles. He then won an Olympic gold medal in Athens in 2004, before becoming a coach at his alma mater Iowa State. Sanderson's Iowa State team finished second, fifth, and third at NCAAs during his time as head coach, qualifying a wrestler in every weight class for the championships during each of his three years — 30 in total.

The Sanderson era got off to a slow start in 2009–2010 with a 9th place NCAA finish, but the team made a splash in 2010–2011 with its second NCAA title, its first under Sanderson. The Nittany Lions were led by a combination of veterans brought in by Sunderland and young talent brought in by Sanderson. Five Nittany Lions finished first in their weight class at the Big Ten Tournament, including two redshirt freshmen: former number one pound-for-pound recruit David Taylor, who had followed Sanderson from Iowa State to Penn State, and Ed Ruth, who had committed to the previous regime but remained committed when Sanderson was hired. Redshirt sophomore Quentin Wright would go on to win his first NCAA title at 184 pounds, the first individual NCAA title under Sanderson at Penn State.

In the 2011-2012 season, the team had similar success, winning their third team title behind the individual success of Taylor, Ruth, and Frank Molinaro. Molinaro, a redshirt senior, won his first NCAA title in his fifth and final year of eligibility with the program. Taylor and Ruth each won their first NCAA titles, with Taylor being awarded the Hodge Trophy following the season as the nation's most outstanding wrestler.

Penn State returned to win a third straight NCAA title in 2012–2013, with Ruth winning his second individual title and Wright bouncing back from a finals loss in 2012 to win a second title in his final year of eligibility. Taylor finished as a runner up to future four-time NCAA champion Kyle Dake. The Nittany Lions would go on to win their fourth straight title in 2013–2014. Now fifth-year seniors, Taylor and Ruth won their final NCAA titles, with Taylor picking up his second Hodge Trophy.

The Nittany Lions took a step back in 2014-2015 season following the graduation of Taylor and Ruth, posting a sixth place NCAA finish with only one individual national champion: fifth-year senior Matt Brown. The team's February 22 win over Rider marked the start of a historic 60-match dual meet win streak, which would last through 2019.

The 2015–2016 season saw a return to the program's winning ways, with the team's young talent shining on the way to another team title. Redshirt sophomore Zain Retherford won his first NCAA title, and redshirt freshmen Jason Nolf and Bo Nickal each finished as runner up at their weight classes. Fifth-year senior Nico Megaludis also won his first NCAA title, making him Penn State's only 125 pound NCAA champion under Sanderson.

Penn State's young talent led to a historic 2016–2017 season. The team won its seventh NCAA title, while also tying the record for most individual titles with five. Retherford repeated as an NCAA champion and won the Hodge Trophy as the nation's top wrestler, and Nickal and Nolf each won their first NCAA titles. Redshirt freshman Vincenzo Joseph and true freshman Mark Hall won NCAA titles as well, making them the first freshman national champions at Penn State under Cael Sanderson.

With all five national champions returning in 2017–2018, it was more of the same for the Nittany Lions, and they captured their eighth national title. In his final season, Retherford became the first Penn State wrestler to win three NCAA titles and was awarded another Hodge Trophy, and Nickal, Nolf, and Joseph would each repeat their titles as well. Penn State won their ninth NCAA title in 2018–2019 behind the third and final titles from Nickal and Nolf, who found themselves in a contested race for the Hodge Trophy. Nickal would win with 37 first place votes to Nolf's 10 first place votes. Heavyweight Anthony Cassar defeated Minnesota's Gable Steveson to win his first and only national title.

The 2019-2020 NCAA Tournament was cancelled due to the COVID-19 pandemic, preventing seniors Joseph and Hall from competing for a final title. The season was largely a down year for the Nittany Lions. Penn State's fourth-place finish in the Big Ten Tournament was its lowest since 2015, and their 60-match dual meet win streak ended with a loss to Arizona State. The Nittany Lions lost their first title since 2015 in the COVID-shortened 2020–2021 season, but demonstrated strong individual success with four first-time title winners: senior Nick Lee, junior Roman Bravo-Young, sophomore Aaron Brooks, and redshirt freshman Carter Starocci. Each wrestler on the roster in 2020-2021 was granted an extra year of eligibility due to the shortened season.

Penn State returned to the top of the podium in 2021–2022, winning their tenth NCAA title and once again tying the record for individual national titles with five. Each of the four 2021 winners repeated as champions, and Cornell transfer Max Dean won his first and only NCAA title at 197 pounds. 2022-23 saw an eleventh national title, with Brooks and Starocci winning their third individual NCAA titles.

Penn State put together a historic performance in the 2023–2024 season, putting up an NCAA Tournament record 172.5 points and defeating the second place team, Cornell, by 100 points en route to a twelfth NCAA team title. Starocci and Brooks became the sixth and seventh wrestlers in NCAA history, and the first Penn State wrestlers, to win four individual NCAA titles, Brooks was awarded the Hodge trophy for his undefeated season. Sophomore Levi Haines and redshirt senior Greg Kerkvliet also won their first individual titles. In 2025, Starocci became the first five-time NCAA Champion.

In 2026, Penn State captured its 13th NCAA Men's Wrestling Championship of the Cael Sanderson era, after a technical fall by Marcus Blaze in the Consolation Semifinals. This was their 13th championship in the last 15 years, dating back to the 2010-2011 season.

== Facilities ==
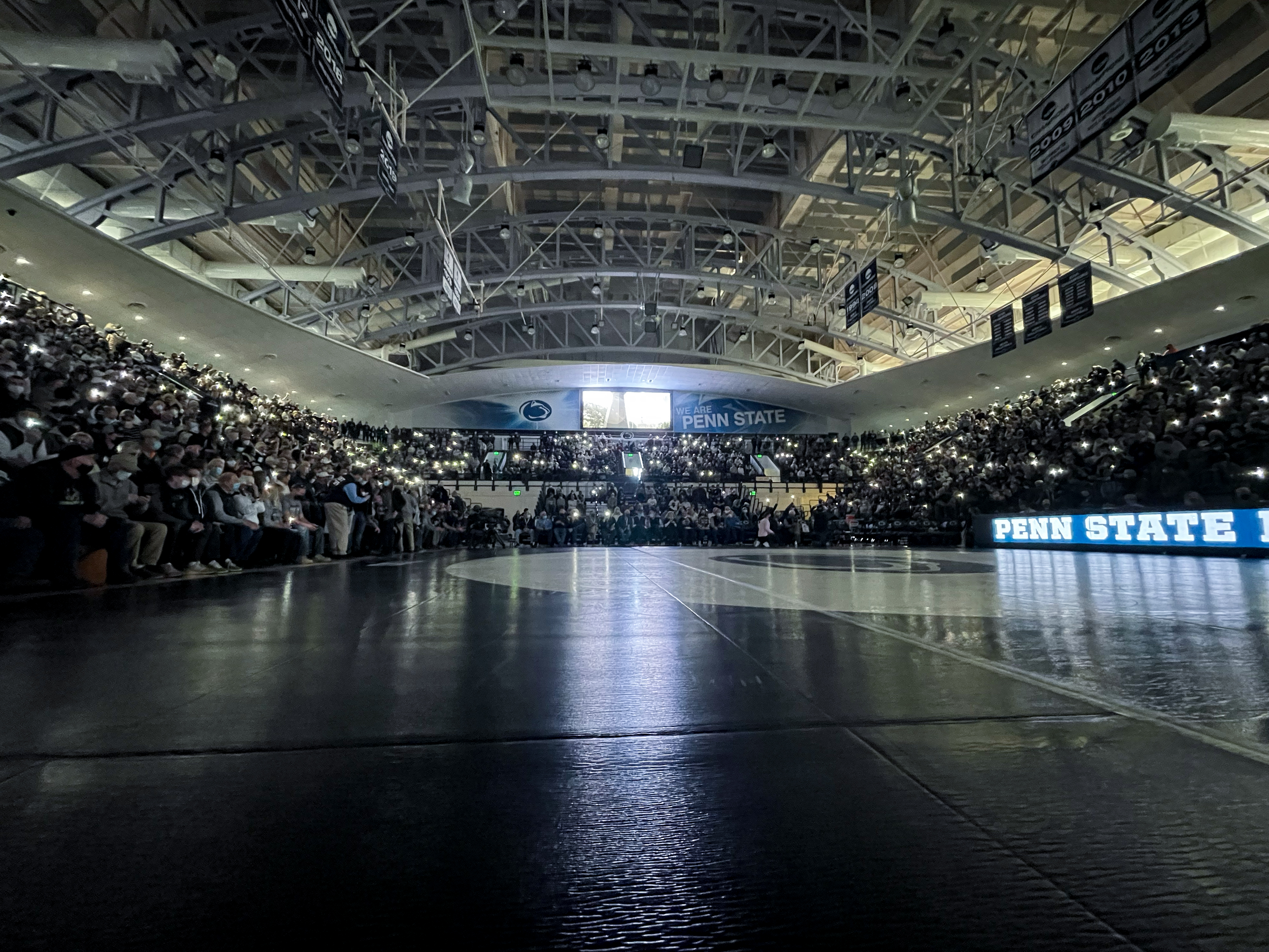
Rec Hall during an NCAA college wrestling dual between first-ranked Penn State and eighth-ranked Nebraska in February 2022

Penn State University has two main wrestling venues: Rec Hall and Bryce Jordan Center.

Rec Hall is the home of Penn State wrestling. Built in 1929, Rec Hall has been the home of Penn State wrestling since the team's inception. The facility has a seating capacity of around 6,500 spectators.

In recent years, Penn State has also started hosting some wrestling events at the Bryce Jordan Center, which is a larger and more modern arena that opened in 1996. The facility has a seating capacity of over 15,000 spectators.

The training facility for the team is the Lorenzo Wrestling Complex, located at Penn State, provides training amenities spanning over 24,000 square feet, including a practice room, weight room, locker room, and academic support area for Penn State wrestlers. Additionally, the complex is also utilized as the training hub for the Nittany Lion Wrestling Club, which is a designated U.S. Olympic Regional Training Center.

== Current lineup ==
125 Luke Lilledahl

133 Masanosuke Ono

141 Marcus Blaze

149 Shayne Van Ness

157 Tyler Kasak

165 PJ Duke

174 Mitchell Mesenbrink

184 Rocco Welsh

197 Josh Barr

285 Connor Mirasola

== Coaching ==
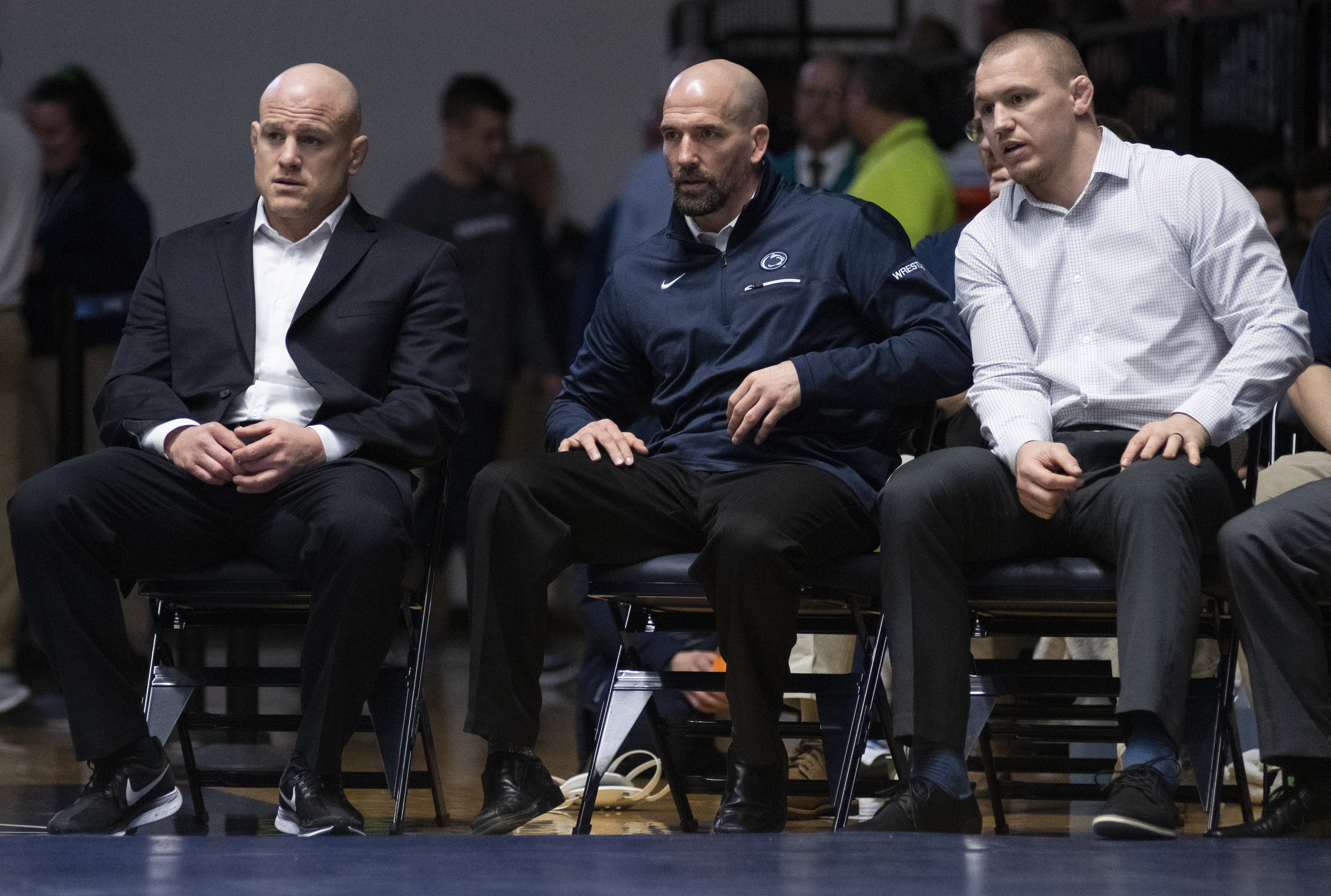
Head coach Cael Sanderson and assistant coaches look on during their match against Buffalo at Rec Hall in February 2019

Position	Name
Head coach	Cael Sanderson
Associate Head Coach	Cody Sanderson
Head Assistant Coach	Casey Cunningham
Director of Operations	Adam Lynch

== Honors ==
Team Awards
Competitions	Titles	Seasons
Pre-NCAA National Championships	1	1921
NCAA National Championships	14	1953, 2011, 2012, 2013, 2014, 2016, 2017, 2018, 2019, 2022, 2023, 2024, 2025, 2026
Big Ten Tournament	10	2011, 2012, 2013, 2014, 2016, 2019, 2023, 2024, 2025, 2026
Big Ten Regular Season	12	2011–12, 2013–14, 2015–16, 2016–17, 2017–18, 2018–19, 2020–21, 2021–22, 2022–23, 2023–24, 2024-25, 2025-26
Individual Awards
Honor	Wins	Recipient & Season
Dan Hodge Trophy	8	Kerry McCoy (1997), David Taylor (2012, 2014) Zain Retherford (2017, 2018), Bo Nickal (2019), Aaron Brooks (2024), Mitchell Mesenbrink (2026)
NCAA National Champions	65	Howard Johnston (1935), Joe Lemyre (1952), Hud Samson (1953), Larry Fornicola (1955), Bill Oberly (1955), Jon Johnston (1957), Andy Matter (1971, 1972), John Fritz (1975), Carl Destefanis (1984), Scott Lynch (1984), Jim Martin (1988), Jeff Prescott (1991, 1992), Kerry McCoy (1994, 1997), John Hughes (1995), Sanshiro Abe (1996), Glen Pritzlaff (1999), Jeremy Hunter (2000), Phil Davis (2008), Frank Molinaro (2012), David Taylor (2012, 2014), Ed Ruth (2012, 2013, 2014), Quentin Wright (2011, 2013), Matt Brown (2015), Nico Megaludis (2016), Zain Retherford (2016, 2017, 2018), Jason Nolf (2017, 2018, 2019), Vincenzo Joseph (2017, 2018), Mark Hall (2017), Bo Nickal (2017, 2018, 2019), Anthony Cassar (2019), Roman Bravo-Young (2021, 2022), Max Dean (2022), Nick Lee (2021, 2022), Carter Starocci (2021, 2022, 2023, 2024, 2025), Aaron Brooks (2021, 2022, 2023, 2024), Greg Kerkvliet (2024), Levi Haines (2024), Mitchell Mesenbrink (2025), Luke Lilledahl (2026), Mitchell Mesenbrink (2026), Levi Haines (2026), Josh Barr (2026)

Last updated: March 31, 2023
Source: Penn State Athletics

== Olympians ==
Penn State wrestlers in the Olympics
Year	Name	Country	Style	Weight Class	Place
1908 London	Lee Talbott	United States	Freestyle	+73 kg	9th
1924 Paris	Katsutoshi Naito	Japan	Freestyle	61 kg	Bronze
1924 Paris	Katsutoshi Naito	Japan	Greco-Roman	62 kg	8th
1988 Seoul	Ken Chertow	United States	Freestyle	52 kg	DNP
1996 Atlanta	Sanshiro Abe	Japan	Freestyle	57 kg	9th
2000 Sydney	Cary Kolat	United States	Freestyle	63 kg	9th
2000 Sydney	Kerry McCoy	United States	Freestyle	130 kg	5th
2004 Athens	Kerry McCoy	United States	Freestyle	120 kg	7th
2016 Rio de Janeiro	Frank Molinaro	United States	Freestyle	65 kg	5th
2020 Tokyo	David Taylor	United States	Freestyle	86 kg	Gold
2024 Paris	Roman Bravo-Young	Mexico	Freestyle	57 kg	12th
2024 Paris	Aaron Brooks	United States	Freestyle	86 kg	Bronze
2024 Paris	Zain Retherford	United States	Freestyle	65 kg	8th

== Notable Penn State wrestlers ==
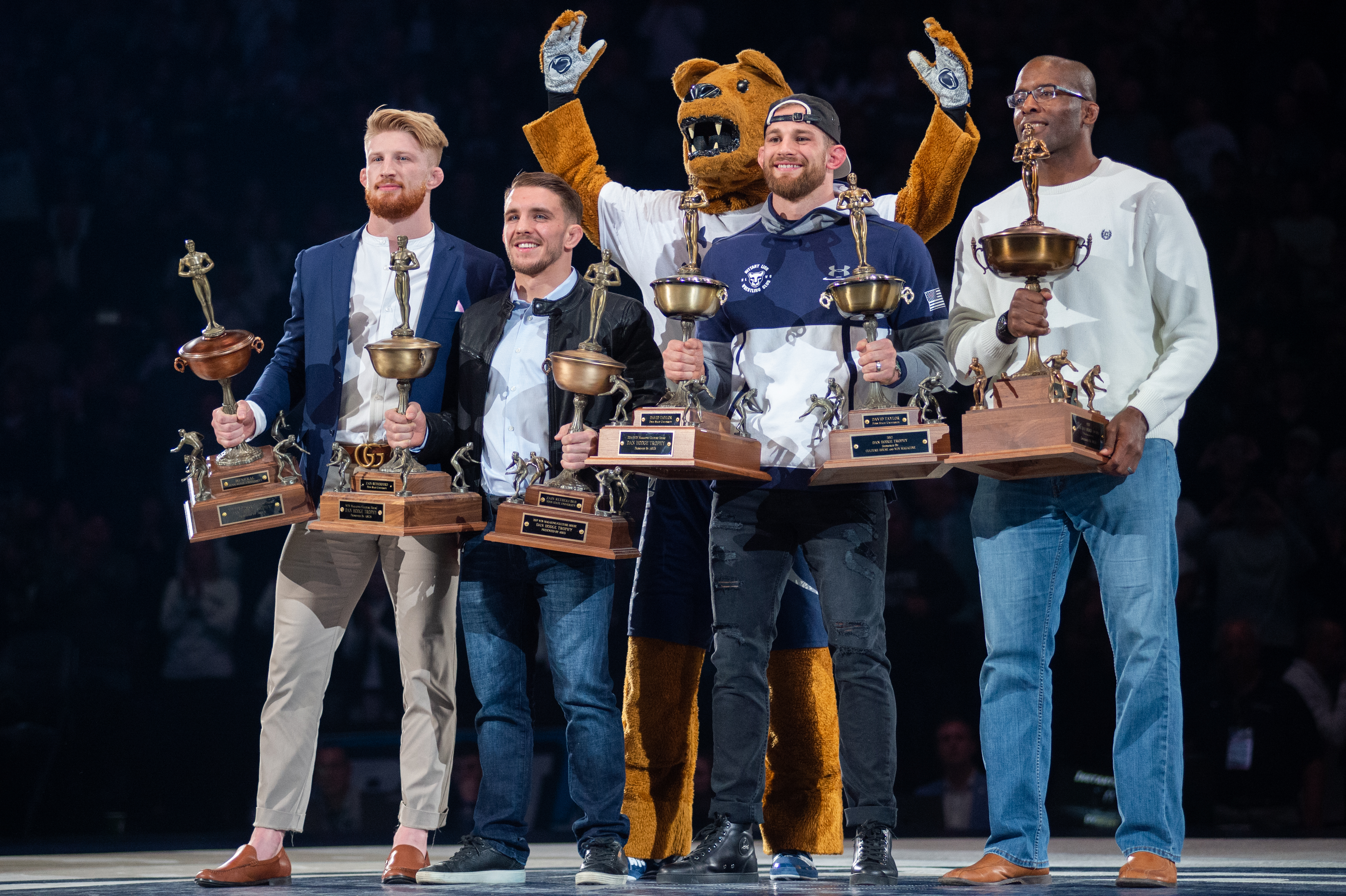
Penn State Wrestling's Dan Hodge Trophy recipients. Left to right: Bo Nickal, Zain Retherford, David Taylor, and Kerry McCoy, honored prior to Penn State's match against Ohio State in February 2020 at the Bryce Jordan Center

- Sanshiro Abe, four-time All-American, NCAA National Champion, and represented Japan at the 1996 Summer Olympics in freestyle wrestling
- Beau Bartlett, NCAA All-American and Junior World medalist in freestyle wrestling
- Roman Bravo-Young, two-time NCAA National Champion
- Aaron Brooks, Olympic bronze medalist at the 2024 Summer Olympics in freestyle wrestling, four-time NCAA National Champion, Cadet World Champion and Junior World silver medalist
- Anthony Cassar, NCAA National Champion
- Ken Chertow, three-time NCAA All-American and Olympian in freestyle wrestling at the 1988 Summer Olympics
- Patrick Cummins, former UFC fighter, NCAA runner-up and two-time All-American
- Phil Davis, former UFC fighter and Bellator Light Heavyweight World Champion, NCAA National Champion and four-time All-American
- Mark Hall, 2021 US Open National Champion, one-time Cadet and two-time Junior World Champion in freestyle wrestling, NCAA National Champion and three-time finalist
- Bubba Jenkins, NCAA All-American and finalist at Penn State, Junior World Champion in freestyle wrestling
- Greg Kerkvliet, NCAA National Champion and three-time All-American
- Cary Kolat, Olympian and two-time World medalist in freestyle wrestling, two-time NCAA All-American at Penn State
- Nick Lee, two-time NCAA National Champion, 2023 World Team member for Team USA in freestyle wrestling
- Mason Manville, 2017 World Team member for Team USA in Greco-Roman wrestling
- Katsutoshi Naito, Olympic bronze medalist at the 1924 Summer Olympics for Japan in freestyle wrestling
- Kerry McCoy, two-time NCAA National Champion, three-time All-American, and two-time Olympian in freestyle wrestling at the 2000 and 2004 Summer Olympics; World silver medalist in 2003
- Frank Molinaro, Olympian at the 2016 Summer Olympics in freestyle wrestling, NCAA National Champion, two-time finalist, and four-time All-American
- Rohan Murphy, Paralympian weightlifter and motivational speaker
- Bo Nickal, UFC fighter, gold medalist at the U23 World Wrestling Championships in freestyle wrestling, three-time NCAA National Champion, and four-time finalist
- Jason Nolf, three-time NCAA National Champion, four-time finalist, and gold medalist at the 2020 Pan American Wrestling Championships
- Jeff Prescott, two-time NCAA National Champion and three-time All-American
- Zain Retherford, Olympian at the 2024 Summer Olympics in freestyle wrestling, World Champion in 2023 and World silver medalist in 2022, Cadet World Champion, three-time NCAA National Champion, and four-time All-American
- Ed Ruth, MMA fighter, three-time NCAA National Champion and four-time All-American
- Carter Starocci, five-time NCAA National Champion
- David Taylor, Olympic gold medalist at the 2020 Summer Olympics in freestyle wrestling, three-time World Champion, two-time NCAA National Champion and four-time finalist

== See also ==
- Iowa-Penn State rivalry
