= Sayed Hafez Shehata =

Egyptian wrestler

Personal information
- Nationality: Egyptian
- Born: 25 April 1927

Sport
- Sport: Wrestling

Sayed Hafez Shehata (born 25 April 1927) was an Egyptian wrestler. He competed at the 1948 Summer Olympics and the 1952 Summer Olympics.
