= Joseph Trimpont =

Belgian wrestler (1918–2008)

Personal information
- Full name: Joseph Théodore Trimpont
- Nationality: Belgian
- Born: 24 September 1918 Brussels, Belgium
- Died: 14 December 2008 (aged 90) Anderlecht, Belgium

Sport
- Sport: Wrestling

Joseph Théodore Trimpont (24 September 1918 – 14 December 2008) was a Belgian wrestler. He competed at the 1948 Summer Olympics and the 1952 Summer Olympics. Trimpont died in Anderlecht on 14 December 2008 at the age of 90.
