= Lajos Bencze =

Hungarian wrestler

Personal information
- Nationality: Hungarian
- Born: 14 October 1918; Budapest, Hungary
- Died: 28 July 1994 (aged 75); Budapest, Hungary

Sport
- Sport: Wrestling

Lajos Bencze (14 October 1918 – 28 July 1994) was a Hungarian wrestler. He competed at the 1948 Summer Olympics and the 1952 Summer Olympics.
