= Paul Hänni (wrestler) =

Swiss wrestler (1927–2020)

Personal information
- Nationality: Swiss
- Born: 18 September 1927; Arni, Switzerland
- Died: 19 December 2020 (aged 93); Winterthur, Switzerland

Sport
- Sport: Wrestling

Paul Hänni (18 September 1927 – 19 December 2020) was a Swiss wrestler. He competed at the 1952 Summer Olympics and the 1960 Summer Olympics.
