= Northern Iowa Panthers wrestling =

University of Northern Iowa wrestling team

- University: University of Northern Iowa
- Head Coach: Doug Schwab
- Conference: Big 12
- Location: Cedar Falls, IA
- Nickname: Panthers
- Colors: Purple and old gold

Team national championships
- 3

National championship years
- NCAA Division I – 1950; NCAA Division II – 1975, 1978

NCAA individual champions
- 42 (21 NCAA Division I, 21 NCAA Division II)

All-Americans
- 208 (129 NCAA Division I, 79 NCAA Division II)

The Northern Iowa Panthers wrestling team represents the University of Northern Iowa and competes in the Big 12 Conference. The Panthers are one-time Division I National Champions and four-time National Runners-up. The team is coached by Doug Schwab.

The University of Northern Iowa Wrestling team, founded in 1923, won the NCAA (Single division) national championship in 1950 and the NCAA Division II national championships in 1975 and 1978. They competed in the Western Wrestling Conference until 2012, when UNI became an associate member of the Mid-American Conference since the Missouri Valley Conference is a non-wrestling conference. The Panthers continued to compete in the MAC through the 2016–17 season, after which they moved to the Big 12.

Doug Schwab is the current head coach for the Northern Iowa Wrestling Team. Mission Statement - To communicate with UNI wrestling fans to support, encourage, promote a successful UNI wrestling tradition. Through 2023, the team has had 42 NCAA champions (21 in Division I and 21 in Division II), and 208 All-Americans (129 in Division I and 79 in Division II).

== Team accomplishments ==
- NCAA Division I Team Champions: 1950
- NCAA Division I Team Runner-Up: 1946, 1947, 1949 and 1952
- NCAA Division II Team Champions: 1975 and 1978
- NCAA Division II Team Runner-Up: 1970, 1972, 1974 and 1980

== Olympians ==
Northern Iowa wrestlers in the Olympics
Year	Name	Country	Style	Weight Class	Place
1932 Los Angeles	Maynard Harman	United States	Freestyle	–	ALT
1948 London	Bill Nelson	United States	Freestyle	–	ALT
1948 London	Bill Koll	United States	Freestyle	67 kg	5th
1948 London	Gerry Leeman	United States	Freestyle	57 kg	Silver
1952 Helsinki	Bill Smith	United States	Freestyle	73 kg	Gold

== Notable Northern Iowa wrestlers ==
- Joe Colon, World Championships bronze medalist (2018) and NCAA All-American (2014)
- Parker Keckeisen, NCAA Division I Champion 184 pounds (2024)
- Bill Koll, Three-time NCAA Champion (1946, 1947, 1948) and member of 1948 U.S. Olympic freestyle team
- Gerry Leeman, Olympic Silver Medalist (1948) and NCAA champion (1946)
- Bill Smith, Olympic Gold Medalist (1952) and two-time NCAA champion (1949, 1950)
