= Frank Lewis (wrestler) =

American wrestler (1912–1998)

Personal information
- Full name: Frank Wiatt Lewis
- Born: December 6, 1912 Coleman, Texas, U.S.
- Died: August 16, 1998 (aged 85) Stillwater, Oklahoma, U.S.
- Home town: Cushing, Oklahoma, U.S.

Sport
- Country: United States
- Sport: Wrestling
- Events: Freestyle and Folkstyle
- College team: Oklahoma A&M
- Team: USA
- Coached by: Edward C. Gallagher
Medal record
Men's freestyle wrestling
Representing the United States
Olympic Games
Gold medal – first place	1936 Berlin	72 kg
Collegiate Wrestling
Representing Oklahaoma A&M
NCAA Championships
Gold medal – first place	1935 Bethlehem	155 lb
Silver medal – second place	1934 Ann Arbor	155 lb

Frank Wiatt Lewis (December 6, 1912 – August 16, 1998) was an American wrestler and Olympic champion. He competed at the 1936 Olympic Games in Berlin, where he earned a gold medal in the freestyle welterweight (72 kg) division.

Lewis was born in Coleman, Texas and raised in Cushing, Oklahoma. In high school, he won a Oklahoma wrestling state championship in 1929. He wrestled collegiately at Oklahoma State (then called Oklahoma A&M). He was an NCAA runner-up in 1934 and the NCAA champion in 1935 at 155 pounds, while also being named Most Outstanding Wrestler of the event.

After college, he earned a sport on the U.S. Olympic freestyle wrestling team, winning a gold medal in the welterweight division (72 kg) at the 1936 Olympic Games.

In 1979, Lewis was inducted in the National Wrestling Hall of Fame as a Distinguished Member.
