= Edward C. Gallagher =

American wrestling coach

Biographical details
- Born: September 5, 1887; Perth, Kansas, U.S.
- Died: August 28, 1940 (aged 52); Oklahoma City, Oklahoma, U.S.
- Education: Oklahoma A&M

Coaching career (HC unless noted)

Football
- 1913–1914: Baker

Wrestling
- 1916–1940: Oklahoma A&M

Administrative career (AD unless noted)
- 1915–1933: Oklahoma A&M

Head coaching record
- Overall: 136-5-4 (Wrestling)

Accomplishments and honors

Championships
- 11× NCAA Wrestling Championships (1928, 1929, 1930, 1931, 1933, 1934, 1935, 1937, 1938, 1939, 1940)

Awards
- National Wrestling Hall of Fame Distinguished Member (1976)

Edward Clark Gallagher (September 5, 1887 – August 28, 1940) was an American wrestling coach. He coached at Oklahoma Agricultural and Mechanical College—now known as Oklahoma State University–Stillwater—from 1916 to 1940. With his knowledge of physical principles like leverage and stress, along with anatomy, he all but invented the modern style of folkstyle wrestling. He remains one of the most successful coaches in NCAA athletics history. Overall in his wrestling coaching career at Oklahoma A&M, his teams went 136–5–4, including 19 undefeated seasons and 11 NCAA titles.

Gallagher-Iba Arena on campus at Oklahoma State University in Stillwater, Oklahoma, is named after him. In 1976, Gallagher was inducted into the inaugural class of the National Wrestling Hall of Fame as a Distinguished Member.

== Early years ==
Gallagher was born in Perth, Kansas on September 5, 1887.

In high school and college, he excelled in football and track. While a student at Oklahoma A&M (now Oklahoma State), Gallagher won the 100-yard dash in a Southwest Conference meet in 9.8 seconds. In 1908, he ran for a 99-yard touchdown against Kansas State, which still stands as a school record for longest run from scrimmage.

Gallagher didn't wrestle as a competitor, only coaching wrestling during his high school and collegiate days. Later after becoming the head wrestling coach at Oklahoma A&M, he would spend the rest of his career involved in wrestling.

== Coaching career ==
=== Early coaching career ===
Gallagher earned a degree in electrical engineering from Oklahoma A&M in 1909. Upon graduation, he stayed at the Stillwater school, where he served as track coach. In 1913, he left Oklahoma A&M for Baker University in Baldwin City, Kansas, where he coached all sports.

He held the head football coach position at Baker for the 1913 and 1914 seasons. His football coaching record at Baker was 8 wins and 8 losses.

=== Oklahoma A&M ===
In 1915, he returned to Oklahoma A&M as athletic director. During the 1914–15 school year, Oklahoma A&M started its wrestling program, with A.M. Colville as coach. That first season, the team wrestled only one dual meet, and lost to the University of Texas. In the 1915–16 school year, Gallagher named himself wrestling coach while remaining athletic director. The team again had only one dual meet, and again lost to Texas. However, by the second year, Gallagher's wrestlers competed in three duals, winning two (against Emporia State and Texas) and tying with Arkansas. The team did not compete during World War I.

In the years immediately after World War I, Gallagher's Oklahoma A&M wrestlers—by now known as the Cowboys—never had a losing season. In the eleven-year period from the 1919–20 through the 1930–31 seasons, the team had 70 straight wins. The streak was broken in the last dual meet of the 1930–31 season against cross-state rival, the University of Oklahoma Sooners. During the rest of the 1930s, the Cowboys lost only one other dual meet (at Southwestern Oklahoma State in the 1936–37 season) and had three ties.

In 1928, the National Collegiate Athletic Association (NCAA) held its first national college wrestling championship. At that first NCAAs—hosted by Iowa State—Gallagher's wrestlers won four of the seven titles. In the thirteen years of NCAA championships with Gallagher as coach, 22 individual Cowboy wrestlers won a total of 37 NCAA titles.

=== Olympic success ===
From 1924 through 1936, fifteen of Ed Gallagher's wrestlers qualified for U.S. Olympic teams, along with Earl McCready competing for his native Canada at the 1928 Olympics, and George Chiga wrestling for Canada in 1936.

Four Cowboy Olympic wrestlers coached by Gallagher earned medals. Bobby Pearce and Jack VanBebber both won gold medals at the 1932 Los Angeles Olympics. At the 1936 Berlin Olympics, Frank Lewis won the gold, while teammate Ross Flood earned silver.

Ed Gallagher served as honorary coach for the 1936 U.S. Olympic team.

=== Scientific approach to wrestling ===
Using his engineering knowledge, Gallagher studied leverage, and how it applied to wrestling. Gallagher selected over 400 wrestling holds, and expected each of his wrestlers to master about 200.

Gallagher openly shared what he learned with others. He and his teams often conducted wrestling demonstrations before or after dual meets. In 1939, he and his Cowboy wrestlers demonstrated holds in a three-page photo-article in Life magazine. He also wrote two instructional books, "Amateur Wrestling" and "Wrestling."

== Later life ==
In the 1930s, Gallagher was diagnosed with Parkinson's disease. In 1938, he retired as director of physical education but remained on as wrestling coach.

February 3, 1939 was "Gallagher Day" at Oklahoma A&M and Stillwater, the day the new 4-H Club and Student Activity Building was dedicated. Soon afterward, it was renamed Gallagher Hall in Gallagher's honor. This structure has since been renamed Gallagher-Iba Arena to honor both Gallagher and Henry Iba, long-time basketball coach at Oklahoma A&M/State.

The Cowboys' first season in the new arena was the last to be coached by Gallagher. He died on a vacation to Colorado on August 28, 1940. His funeral was held in the arena.

== Honors ==
In 1976, Gallagher was inducted into the inaugural class of the National Wrestling Hall of Fame as a Distinguished Member. For the 75th anniversary of the NCAA wrestling championships in 2005, Gallagher was named by wrestling fans as one of the three all-time great college wrestling coaches (along with Dan Gable, University of Iowa, and Harold Nichols, Iowa State University). Gallagher's name is also on the award given each year to an outstanding Oklahoma A&M wrestling alumnus.

== Head coaching record ==
=== Wrestling ===
The following table shows Gallagher's wins as coach at Oklahoma A&M:

Year	Record (Wins-Losses-Ties)	NCAA Team Finish	National Champions	All-Americans
1916	0-1-0	N/A	N/A	N/A
1917	2-0-1	N/A	N/A	N/A
1918	no team	N/A	N/A	N/A
1919	no team	N/A	N/A	N/A
1920	3-0-0	N/A	N/A	N/A
1921	3-2-0	N/A	N/A	N/A
1922	5-0-0	N/A	N/A	N/A
1923	5-0-0	N/A	N/A	N/A
1924	4-0-0	N/A	N/A	N/A
1925	5-0-0	N/A	N/A	N/A
1926	6-0-0	N/A	N/A	N/A
1927	9-0-0	N/A	N/A	N/A
1928	6-0-0	1st	4	5
1929	6-0-0	1st	4	6
1930	7-0-0	1st	3	6
1931	7-0-0	1st	4	7
1932	7-1-0	2nd	0	3
1933	7-0-1	T-1st	3	4
1934	8-0-0	1st	3	5
1935	8-0-0	1st	3	5
1936	7-0-1	T-2nd	1	4
1937	6-1-1	1st	4	7
1938	9-0-0	1st	3	4
1939	6-0-0	1st	3	7
1940	10-0-0	1st	2	6

== See also ==
- List of Oklahoma State University Olympians
