= 1957 NCAA wrestling championships =

American collegiate wrestling tournament

1957 NCAA Wrestling Championships
Tournament information
- Sport: College wrestling
- Location: Pittsburgh, Pennsylvania
- Dates: March 1957–March 1957
- Host(s): University of Pittsburgh
- Venue(s): Fitzgerald Field House

Final positions
- Champions: Oklahoma (4th title)
- 1st runners-up: Pittsburgh
- 2nd runners-up: Iowa State
- MVP: Dan Hodge (Oklahoma)

The 1957 NCAA Wrestling Championships were the 27th NCAA Wrestling Championships to be held. University of Pittsburgh in Pittsburgh, Pennsylvania hosted the tournament at Fitzgerald Field House.

Oklahoma took home the team championship with 73 points and having two individual champions.

Dan Hodge of Oklahoma was named the Most Outstanding Wrestler.

== Team results ==
Rank	School	Points
1	Oklahoma	73
2	Pittsburgh	66
3	Iowa State	38
4	Oklahoma State	37
5	Penn State	33
T-6	Michigan	30
T-6	Illinois	30
8	Iowa	27
9	Lehigh	19
T-10	Virginia	13
T-10	Minnesota	13

== Individual finals ==
Weight class	Championship match (champion in boldface)
115 lbs	**Dick Delgado**, Oklahoma DEC Bill Hulings, Pittsburgh, 8:11
123 lbs	**Ed Peery**, Pittsburgh URD Harmon Leslie, Oklahoma State, 7–7, 2–2
130 lbs	**John Johnston**, Penn State DEC Max Pearson, Michigan, 8–5
137 lbs	**Joe Gratto**, Lehigh DEC John Pepe, Penn State, 9–8
147 lbs	**Simon Roberts**, Iowa DEC Ron Gray, Iowa State, 2–2, 2–0
157 lbs	**Doug Blubaugh**, Oklahoma State DEC Mike Rodriguez, Michigan, 9–3
167 lbs	**Tom Alberts**, Pittsburgh DEC Ralph Schneider, Waynesburg, 8–5
177 lbs	**Dan Hodge**, Oklahoma WBF Ron Flemming, Franklin & Marshall, 7:31
191 lbs	**Ron Schrif**, Pittsburgh SRD Tony Stremic, Navy, 1–1, 1–1
UNL	**Bob Norman**, Illinois DEC Henry Jordan, Virginia, 6–1
