= Douglas Blubaugh =

American wrestler and coach (1934–2011)

Personal information
- Full name: Douglas Morlan Blubaugh
- Born: December 31, 1934 Ponca City, Oklahoma, U.S.
- Died: May 16, 2011 (aged 76) Tonkawa, Oklahoma, U.S.

Sport
- Country: United States
- Sport: Wrestling
- Events: Freestyle and Folkstyle
- College team: Oklahoma A&M
- Club: U.S. Army
- Team: USA
- Coached by: Myron Roderick
Medal record
Men's freestyle wrestling
Representing United States
Olympic Games
Gold medal – first place	1960 Rome	73 kg
Pan American Games
Gold medal – first place	1959 Chicago	78 kg
Collegiate Wrestling
Representing Oklahoma A&M
NCAA Championships
Gold medal – first place	1957 Pittsburgh	157 lb
Silver medal – second place	1956 Stillwater	157 lb
Bronze medal – third place	1955 Ithaca	147 lb

Douglas Morlan Blubaugh (December 31, 1934 – May 16, 2011) was an American wrestler and Olympic Champion. He competed at the 1960 Olympic Games in Rome, where he became the freestyle Olympic Gold Medalist at welterweight, defeating the legendary 1956 Olympic Champion and 3-time World Champion Iranian Wrestler Emam-Ali Habibi.

Blubaugh, born in Ponca City, Oklahoma, was an AAU Champion and an NCAA Champion in 1957 at Oklahoma State University. In 1959 he won another AAU Championship, winning the Outstanding Wrestler Award. Also in 1959 Blubaugh won a Pan-American Games Gold Medal before he made the 1960 Olympic team. While a student at OSU, Blubaugh was initiated as a member of Tau Kappa Epsilon fraternity; in January 2011, he was inducted into the ΤΚΕ Oklahoma Hall of Fame. In 1979, Blubaugh was inducted into the National Wrestling Hall of Fame as a Distinguished Member.

For his efforts in Rome, Blubaugh was named the World's Outstanding Wrestler in 1960. Blubaugh later became wrestling coach at Indiana University.

He resided in Tonkawa, Oklahoma, and continued to be an ambassador for the sport of wrestling until his death in a traffic accident on May 16, 2011. He was struck on his motorcycle by a pickup truck, which ran a stop sign. He was 76.
