= Jake Rosholt =

American collegiate wrestler and mixed martial artist (born 1982)

- Born: September 2, 1982 (age 44); Sandpoint, Idaho, U.S.
- Height: 6 ft 1 in (1.85 m)
- Weight: 205 lb (93 kg; 14.6 st)
- Division: Middleweight (2007–2011); Light Heavyweight (2012)
- Reach: 74 in (190 cm)
- Stance: Orthodox
- Fighting out of: Dallas, Texas, U.S.
- Team: Team Cobra Kai Jiu-Jitsu/Team Takedown
- Wrestling: Oklahoma State (NCAA Division I)
- Years active: 2007–2012

Mixed martial arts record
- Total: 18
- Wins: 12
- By knockout: 5
- By submission: 6
- By decision: 1
- Losses: 5
- By knockout: 2
- By submission: 3
- No contests: 1

Other information
- University: Oklahoma State
- Notable relatives: Jared Rosholt (brother)
- Mixed martial arts record from Sherdog
Medal record
Men's collegiate wrestling
Representing the Oklahoma State Cowboys
NCAA Division I Championships
Gold medal – first place	2003 Kansas City	184 lb
Gold medal – first place	2005 St. Louis	197 lb
Gold medal – first place	2006 Oklahoma City	197 lb
Bronze medal – third place	2004 St. Louis	184 lb
Big 12 Championships
Gold medal – first place	2004 Ames	184 lb
Silver medal – second place	2003 Columbia	184 lb
Silver medal – second place	2005 Lincoln	197 lb
Silver medal – second place	2006 Ames	197 lb

Jake Rosholt (born September 2, 1982) is an American retired mixed martial artist and former collegiate amateur wrestler. A professional competitor from 2007 to 2012, he competed for the UFC, WEC, Bellator, and Shark Fights. He is the older brother of former heavyweight MMA fighter and NCAA Division I wrestling championship finalist Jared Rosholt.

== Early life ==
Born and raised in Sandpoint, Idaho, Rosholt graduated from Sandpoint High School. He won three state titles for the Bulldogs and the 2001 189-pound (86 kg) high school national championship.

He attended Oklahoma State University in Stillwater and won the 184-pound (83 kg) NCAA Division I wrestling title in 2003 as a freshman and the 197-pound (89 kg) title in 2005 and 2006. He was a four-time All-American and the 2004 Big 12 Conference champion.

He placed second in the Big 12 Conference in 2003, 2005 and 2006, but went on to win NCAA championships in all three of those years. He was the fifteenth three-time NCAA champion in Oklahoma State history and just their 10th four-time All-American.

He ended his college career with a 105–20 (.840) record.

== Mixed martial arts career ==
In the spring of 2007, Jake began training for MMA competition at the Las Vegas-based Xtreme Couture gym. He is signed with the Team Takedown management company. He made his WEC debut at WEC 36, facing Nissen Osterneck. Rosholt had difficulty defending against Osterneck's stand-up, but was able to secure a number of takedowns and dominate on the ground before winning by technical knockout. Soon after, the WEC dissolved their middleweight and light heavyweight divisions, and Rosholt was one of the fighters transferred to the UFC.

=== Ultimate Fighting Championship ===
Rosholt was originally scheduled to face Alessio Sakara at UFC Fight Night: Lauzon vs. Stephens, but Sakara withdrew, due to injury, and was replaced by International Fight League champion Dan Miller who quickly disposed of Rosholt in the first round via guillotine choke.

In his second UFC fight, Rosholt defeated The Ultimate Fighter 1 alumni Chris Leben at UFC 102. He won the fight after choking out Leben in round 3. Jake earned the $60,000 bonus for submission of the night. Rosholt lost to Kendall Grove by submission on November 21, 2009 at UFC 106. Following the loss, Rosholt was cut from the UFC.

=== Post UFC ===
Rosholt was set to face UFC and MMA vet Jeremy Horn on April 16 on the "Bad Boys 2" card for King of the Cage, but the fight was canceled when Rosholt sustained a neck injury the day before the event. Rosholt then faced John Ott at Titan FC 18 on May 27, 2011. Rosholt dominated most of the fight until he landed an illegal knee in the third round, resulting in a disqualification loss. However, on June 21, 2011, the Kansas Athletic Commission announced it had overturned the ruling to a no-contest, stating that the knee was landed unintentionally.

Rosholt then fought in a rematch against Matt Horwich at Shark Fights 17: Horwich vs. Rosholt 2 on July 15, 2011. In their first fight, Horwich defeated Rosholt by TKO in the third round in November 2010. This time however, Rosholt used a more conservative strategy as he dominated every round on all three judges scorecards to win a unanimous decision.

Rosholt made his light heavyweight debut against Matt Thompson at XKO 15 on June 2, 2012. Rosholt lost the bout via submission in the first round.

Rosholt faced Anthony Johnson at Xtreme Fight Night 9 on September 21, 2012. He lost the fight via TKO due to a head kick in the second round.

== Championships and accomplishments ==
=== Mixed martial arts ===
- Ultimate Fighting Championship
  - Submission of the Night (One time) vs. Chris Leben

=== Collegiate wrestling ===
- NCAA Division I Wrestling Championships
  - (gold) 2003 NCAA Division I 184-pound wrestling champion
  - (gold) 2005 NCAA Division I 197-pound wrestling champion
  - (gold) 2006 NCAA Division I 197-pound wrestling champion
  - NCAA Division I All-American (Four times)
- Big 12 Conference Wrestling Championships
  - (gold) 2004 Big 12 Conference 184-pound wrestling champion

=== Scholastic wrestling ===
- Three-time Idaho state champion
- 2001 high school 189-pound national champion

== Mixed martial arts record ==
Professional record breakdown
18 matches	12 wins	5 losses
By knockout	5	2
By submission	6	3
By decision	1	0
No contests	1	

Res.	Record	Opponent	Method	Event	Date	Round	Time	Location	Notes
Loss	12–5 (1)	Anthony Johnson	TKO (head kick)	Xtreme Fight Night 9	September 21, 2012	2	4:22	Tulsa, Oklahoma, United States	
Loss	12–4 (1)	Matt Thompson	Submission (kneebar)	XKO 15	June 2, 2012	1	4:16	Arlington, Texas, United States	Light Heavyweight debut.
Win	12–3 (1)	Matt Horwich	Decision (unanimous)	Shark Fights 17: Horwich vs. Rosholt 2	July 15, 2011	3	5:00	Frisco, Texas, United States	
NC	11–3 (1)	John Ott	No Contest (illegal knee)	Titan Fighting Championships 18	May 27, 2011	3	4:23	Kansas City, Kansas, United States	200 lb Catchweight; original loss by DQ; overturned by the commission.
Win	11–3	John Malbrough	Submission (arm-triangle choke)	Cowboy MMA: Caged Cowboys	May 21, 2011	1	1:42	Ponca City, Oklahoma, United States	
Win	10–3	Brandon McDowell	TKO (punches)	Back Alley Promotions	April 8, 2011	1	1:36	Arlington, Texas, United States	
Win	9–3	John Bryant	Technical Submission (rear-naked choke)	Bellator 37	March 19, 2011	1	1:02	Concho, Oklahoma, United States	
Win	8–3	Josh Smidt	Submission (guillotine choke)	C3 Fights: SlamFest	January 29, 2011	1	1:41	Newkirk, Oklahoma, United States	
Loss	7–3	Matt Horwich	TKO (punches)	Xtreme Fight Night: Rosholt vs. Horwich	November 12, 2010	3	2:56	Tulsa, Oklahoma, United States	
Win	7–2	Rudy Lindsey	Submission (rear-naked choke)	XFL: March Badness	March 6, 2010	1	2:37	Tulsa, Oklahoma, United States	Catchweight fight at 195 lbs.
Loss	6–2	Kendall Grove	Submission (triangle choke)	UFC 106	November 21, 2009	1	3:59	Las Vegas, Nevada, United States	
Win	6–1	Chris Leben	Technical Submission (arm-triangle choke)	UFC 102	August 29, 2009	3	1:30	Portland, Oregon, United States	Submission of the Night.
Loss	5–1	Dan Miller	Submission (guillotine choke)	UFC Fight Night: Lauzon vs. Stephens	February 7, 2009	1	1:03	Tampa, Florida, United States	
Win	5–0	Nissen Osterneck	TKO (punches)	WEC 36: Faber vs. Brown	November 5, 2008	2	3:48	Hollywood, Florida, United States	
Win	4–0	Chad Jay	TKO (punches)	Xtreme Fighting League	March 15, 2008	3	2:37	Tulsa, Oklahoma, United States	
Win	3–0	Jeremiah Caves	TKO (punches)	HRP: Fight Night	November 16, 2007	1	1:42	Tulsa, Oklahoma, United States	
Win	2–0	Christopher Clark	TKO (punches)	Masters of the Cage 16	September 28, 2007	3	2:37	Oklahoma City, Oklahoma, United States	
Win	1–0	Dusty Miller	Submission (guillotine choke)	Masters of the Cage 15	July 21, 2007	1	3:40	Oklahoma City, Oklahoma, United States	

== See also ==
- List of male mixed martial artists
