= Robert Pearce (wrestler) =

American wrestler (1908–1996)

Personal information
- Born: February 29, 1908 Wyaconda, Missouri, U.S.
- Died: March 15, 1996 (aged 88) Lloydminster, Alberta, Canada
- Home town: Cushing, Oklahoma, U.S.

Sport
- Country: United States
- Sport: Wrestling
- Events: Freestyle and Folkstyle
- College team: Oklahoma A&M
- Team: USA
- Coached by: Edward C. Gallagher
Medal record
Men's freestyle wrestling
Representing the United States
Olympic Games
Gold medal – first place	1932 Los Angeles	56 kg
Collegiate Wrestling
Representing Oklahoma A&M
NCAA Championships
Gold medal – first place	1931 Providence	126 lb
Silver medal – second place	1932 Bloomington	123 lb

Robert Pearce (February 29, 1908 – March 15, 1996) was an American wrestler and olympic champion. He competed at the 1932 Olympic Games in Los Angeles, where he won a gold medal in freestyle bantamweight.

== Early years ==
Pearce initially took up wrestling during his youth to strengthen himself physically from a constant struggle with allergies. While in high school in Cushing, Oklahoma, Pearce had three undefeated seasons and won three Oklahoma state championships.

== College ==
Pearce wrestled collegiately at Oklahoma A&M (now called Oklahoma State), helping extend head coach Edward C. Gallagher's winning streak to 70 consecutive matches. Overall, Pearce was 60–4–1, winning the NCAA title in 1931 and finishing as runner-up in 1932.

== International ==
Following his runner-up finish as a senior in 1932, Pearce responded by winning the gold medal at the 1932 Summer Olympics, held in Los Angeles, California. His gold medal in 1932 was the first ever for an Oklahoman wrestler.

In 1981, Pearce was inducted into the National Wrestling Hall of Fame as a Distinguished Member.
