= Bill Harlow (wrestler) =

American wrestler (born 1943)

Personal information
- Full name: William Bill Harlow
- Born: December 5, 1943 (age 82) Sewanee, Tennessee, U.S.

Sport
- Country: United States
- Sport: Wrestling
- Events: Freestyle and Folkstyle
- College team: Oklahoma State
- Team: USA
- Coached by: Myron Roderick
Medal record
Men's freestyle wrestling
Representing the United States
World Championships
Silver medal – second place	1970 Edmonton	90 kg
Collegiate Wrestling
Representing the Oklahoma State Cowboys
NCAA Division I Championships
Gold medal – first place	1966 Ames	191 lb
Silver medal – second place	1964 Ithaca	177 lb
Silver medal – second place	1965 Laramie	177 lb
Big 8 Championships
Gold medal – first place	1965 Norman	177 lb
Gold medal – first place	1966 Manhattan	191 lb
Silver medal – second place	1964 Stillwater	177 lb

William Bill Harlow (born December 5, 1943) is an American former freestyle and folkstyle wrestler. In 2016, Harlow was inducted into the National Wrestling Hall of Fame as a Distinguished Member.

== High school ==
Harlow wrestled for St. Andrew's School in Sewanee, Tennessee and enjoyed much success. As a high school senior in 1962, he was a Mid-South, State and National Prep champion, earning Most Outstanding Wrestler honors at all three tournaments.

== College ==
As a sophomore and junior at Oklahoma State University in 1964 and 1965, he finished second at the NCAA Division I Wrestling Championships at 177 pounds (80 kg). He moved up to 191 pounds (87 kg) as a senior in 1966 and became the NCAA champion, helping OSU to win its second national team title during his time there. Harlow was also a two-time Big Eight Conference champion. His record at Oklahoma State was 54-5-2.

== Senior level ==
After leaving OSU, Harlow went on to win three national titles in freestyle wrestling. He won a silver medal at the 1970 World Wrestling Championships, falling to Soviet Gennady Strakhov in the finals at 90 kg.

== Later life ==
Harlow later became a high school coach, administrator and principal, retiring in 2013.

In 2016, Harlow was inducted into the National Wrestling Hall of Fame as a Distinguished Member.
