= 2005 NCAA Division I Wrestling Championships =

American collegiate wrestling tournament

Tournament information
- Sport: College wrestling
- Location: St. Louis, Missouri
- Venue(s): Savvis Center
- Participants: 68

Final positions
- Champions: Oklahoma State (33rd title)
- 1st runners-up: Michigan
- 2nd runners-up: Oklahoma
- MVP: Greg Jones (West Virginia)

The 2005 NCAA Wrestling Team Championship was hosted in St. Louis, Missouri from March 17–19. Dozens of teams competed for the NCAA team championship, and 330 wrestlers competed for individual honors. The Oklahoma State Cowboys crowned five individual champions: Zack Esposito at 149 pounds, Johny Hendricks at 165 pounds, Chris Pendleton at 174 pounds, Jake Rosholt at 197 pounds, and Steve Mocco at 285 pounds. The Cowboys had two additional wrestlers who qualified as All-Americans as they earned a dominant victory in the tournament. The victory by the Cowboys is widely considered one of the most dominant performances in modern wrestling history. It was the 3rd consecutive NCAA tournament victory by the Cowboys, and their 33rd NCAA team wrestling championship overall.

== Team results ==
Rank	School	Points
1	Oklahoma State	153
2	Michigan	83
3	Oklahoma	77.5
4	Cornell	76.5
5	Minnesota	72.5
6	Illinois	70.5
7	Iowa	66
8	Lehigh	60
9	Indiana	58.5
10	Iowa State	57

== Championship finals (with NCAA champions in bold) ==
Weight class	Championship Match (Champion in boldface)
125 lbs	**Joe Dubuque**, Indiana vs. Kyle Ott, Illinois, 2–0
133 lbs	**Travis Lee**, Cornell vs. Shawn Bunch, Edinboro, 6–3
141 lbs	**Teyon Ware**, Oklahoma vs. Nate Gallick, Iowa State, 3–2
149 lbs	**Zack Esposito**, Oklahoma State vs. Phillip Simmons, Army, 5–2
157 lbs	**Ryan Bertin,** Michigan vs. Joe Johnston, Iowa, 8–5
165 lbs	**Johny Hendricks**, Oklahoma State vs. Mark Perry, Iowa, 5–2
174 lbs	**Chris Pendelton**, Oklahoma State vs. Ben Askren, Missouri, 10–5
184 lbs	**Greg Jones**, West Virginia, vs. Tyler Baier, Cornell, 5–3
197 lbs	**Jake Rosholt**, Oklahoma State vs. Sean Stender, 10–3
285 lbs	**Steve Mocco**, Oklahoma State vs. Cole Konrad, Minnesota 3–1
