= Haselrig =

Haselrig is a surname. Notable people with the surname include:

- Arthur Haselrig (1601–1661), English politician
- Carlton Haselrig (1966–2020), American heavyweight wrestler and NFL player
