= Terrence McCann =

American wrestler (1934–2006)

Terry McCann
Personal information
- Full name: Terrence John McCann
- Born: March 23, 1934 Chicago, Illinois, U.S.
- Died: June 7, 2006 (aged 72) Dana Point, California, U.S.

Sport
- Country: United States
- Sport: Wrestling
- Events: Freestyle and Folkstyle
- College team: Iowa
- Club: Tulsa YMCA
- Team: USA
Medal record
Men's freestyle wrestling
Representing the United States
Olympic Games
Gold medal – first place	1960 Rome	57 kg
Collegiate Wrestling
Representing the Iowa Hawkeyes
NCAA Championships
Gold medal – first place	1955 Ithaca	115 lb
Gold medal – first place	1956 Stillwater	115 lb
Bronze medal – third place	1954 Norman	115 lb

Terrence John "Terry" McCann (March 23, 1934 – June 7, 2006), was an American wrestler who won the Gold Medal in the bantamweight division of freestyle wrestling at the 1960 Summer Olympics in Rome, and later helped found the United States Wrestling Federation (now called USA Wrestling). He was born in Chicago, Illinois.

He was also the retired executive director of Toastmasters International, having served in that position for 26 years.

He died in Dana Point, California, at age 72 from mesothelioma, a rare asbestos-linked cancer of the pleura.

== Wrestling ==
McCann began wrestling in a city-sponsored park recreation program when he was 11. McCann wrestled collegiately for the Iowa Hawkeyes where he only lost three matches in three years while winning three Big Ten and two NCAA titles. He then went on to represent the United States in the 1960 Summer Olympics where he won a gold medal. McCann was inducted, as a Distinguished Member, into the National Wrestling Hall of Fame and Museum (USA) in 1977.

== Toastmasters International ==
McCann was appointed as the executive director of Toastmasters International (TI) in March 1975, having accepted the position in February. He was TI's fourth and longest serving executive director.

A decade earlier he had already discovered the benefits of the TI program, when he joined the Oil Capital Toastmasters club in Tulsa, Oklahoma, upon the suggestion of Bill Borders, a friend and former national wrestling champion.

== Hobbies ==
McCann enjoyed physical sports such as bicycling, surfing and weightlifting, despite having endured nine knee operations and a shoulder operation.

== Litigation ==
In August 2005, McCann sued a large number of companies in the Superior Court of Los Angeles County on a variety of product liability theories. Among the defendants he named were Georgia-Pacific, Viacom, Crane Co., Philips, Sunoco, Crown Cork and Seal, Owens-Illinois, John Crane Inc., and Ingersoll Rand.

McCann sued one company, Foster Wheeler, because it had manufactured a boiler installed at an Oklahoma oil refinery where he had been present in 1957 for a couple of weeks while working as an engineering sales trainee for the general contractor building the refinery. Although Foster Wheeler has deep ties to the asbestos industry, particularly in regards to steam condensers, pumps, heat exchangers, and boiler components manufactured for the U.S. Navy, it was undisputed that this particular boiler did not come with any insulation. However, McCann's lawyers argued that Foster Wheeler should be held liable anyway for the refinery's decision to put asbestos-containing insulation on the boiler:

[Foster Wheeler] knew or should have known that the normal and intended operation of its boilers would include the use and application of asbestos containing insulation, and that end users, like [plaintiff], would be exposed to asbestos during the installation of that insulation . . . Foster Wheeler . . . had a duty to warn of this foreseeable hazard.

Foster Wheeler obtained summary judgment against McCann by arguing that California's "borrowing statute," Code of Civil Procedure Section 361, required the superior court to apply Oklahoma's 10-year statute of repose for improvements to real property. While a statute of limitations runs from discovery of an injury, a statute of repose runs from completion of the injury-causing product or building; therefore, under Oklahoma's statute, McCann's right to sue Foster Wheeler terminated in 1968 (even though he did not get sick until many years later).

On February 18, 2010, the Supreme Court of California unanimously ruled, after a lengthy conflict of laws analysis, that California can apply another state's statute of repose against a California resident, like McCann, where all the defendant's tortious conduct occurred only in the other state. In an opinion signed by Chief Justice Ronald M. George, the Court held:

[W]hen the law of the other state limits or denies liability for the conduct engaged in by the defendant in its territory, that state's interest is predominant, and California's legitimate interest in providing a remedy for, or in facilitating recovery by, a current California resident properly must be subordinated because of this state's diminished authority over activity that occurs in another state . . . [T]he state in which the alleged injury-producing conduct occurred (and in which a significant risk of harm to others is posed) generally has the predominant interest in determining the appropriate parameters of liability for conduct undertaken within its borders.

The Court remanded to the Court of Appeal to allow McCann's estate to further litigate its other remaining attack against Foster Wheeler: whether the boiler was actually an improvement to real property within the meaning of the Oklahoma statute of repose. Obviously, if the boiler was not such an improvement, the statute of repose would not apply to cut off McCann's claims. The Court of Appeal eventually did rule for Foster Wheeler and against McCann on that issue, in an unpublished decision released on November 30, 2010. McCann's estate petitioned for review of that decision. The state supreme court denied review on February 16, 2011, thus bringing McCann's lawsuit to an end after over five years of litigation.
