= Loyd Arms =

American football player and wrestler (1919–1999)

Profile
- Position: Guard

Personal information
- Born: September 24, 1919; Sulphur, Oklahoma, U.S.
- Died: June 18, 1999 (aged 79); Garden Grove, California, U.S.
- Listed height: 6 ft 1 in (1.85 m)
- Listed weight: 215 lb (98 kg)

Career information
- High school: Sulphur (OK)
- College: Oklahoma A&M
- NFL draft: 1943: 14th round, 129 (by the Chicago Bears)th overall pick

Career history
- Chicago Cardinals (1946–1948)

Awards and highlights
- NFL champion (1947)
- Stats at Pro Football Reference

Medal record

Collegiate Wrestling

Representing Oklahoma A&M

NCAA Championships
Gold medal – first place	1942 East Lansing	Heavyweight
Bronze medal – third place	1941 Bethlehem	Heavyweight

Loyd "Pig" Arms (September 24, 1919 – June 18, 1999) was an American professional football player. He was born in Sulphur, Oklahoma. Arms was drafted by the Chicago Bears in 1943, but he played his entire professional career (1946–1948) with the Chicago Cardinals. He also wrestled in college at Oklahoma A&M, where he was an NCAA national champion and three-time All-American.

== Wrestling career ==
Arms was a high school wrestler in the state of Oklahoma during the late 1930s. He wrestled in the heavyweight division, and captured the Oklahoma state heavyweight title in both 1938 and 1939.

Following high school, Arms began wrestling at Oklahoma A&M University. He was named an All-American during his sophomore season in 1941 when he placed third in the nation in the heavyweight division. The following year as a junior, he won the NCAA national championship in the heavyweight division. He spent the next three years in the Army serving his country during World War II.

After the conclusion of the war, Arms aimed to defend his title as the NCAA heavyweight national champion. In the 1946 NCAA tournament, he was knocked out of title contention by George Bollas, a 300+ pound wrestler from Ohio State. Arms would place fourth, and was named an All-American for the third time.

== NFL career ==
Arms was drafted in the 14th round by the Chicago Bears with the 129th overall selection of the 1943 NFL draft, becoming the second player in the history of Oklahoma A&M to be drafted into the NFL. He would not play a game until the conclusion of World War II. In 1946 Arms began his NFL playing career with the Chicago Cardinals. He played in eight games, recorded five starts and is credited with one fumble recovery.

In 1947, Arms started all 12 games at the left guard position for the eventual NFL Champion Chicago Cardinals. The Cardinals defeated the Philadelphia Eagles 28–21 in the 1947 NFL Championship game, to earn the franchise's second NFL Championship (1925). The Cardinals franchise has not won a championship since that day, the longest active drought of any NFL team.

The following season, Arms appeared in seven games (two starts) with the Chicago Cardinals. The Cardinals finished the season 11–1, eventually losing a 7–0 battle to the Philadelphia Eagles in the 1948 NFL Championship Game. Following the 1948 season, Arms retired from the NFL.

Arms was mentioned on page 268 of Howard Robert's book, "The Story of Pro Football" written in 1953. When discussing the 1947 Chicago Cardinals championship season, Johnson describes Arms as one of the "potent guards" who helped block for the "dream backfield" that led the Cardinals to the championship.

== Death ==
Arms died on June 18, 1999; he was 79 years old. He is buried in the Riverside National Cemetery in Riverside, California.
