= 1989 NCAA Division I Wrestling Championships =

American collegiate wrestling tournament

Tournament information
- Sport: College wrestling
- Location: Oklahoma City, Oklahoma
- Dates: March 16, 1989–March 18, 1989
- Host(s): University of Oklahoma and Oklahoma State University
- Venue: Myriad Convention Center

Final positions
- Champions: Oklahoma State (28th title)
- 1st runners-up: Arizona State
- 2nd runners-up: Iowa State
- MVP: Tim Krieger (Iowa State)

The 1989 NCAA Division I Wrestling Championships were the 59th NCAA Division I Wrestling Championships to be held. Both University of Oklahoma in Norman, Oklahoma and Oklahoma State University in Stillwater, Oklahoma hosted the tournament. The tournament was held at the Myriad Convention Center in downtown Oklahoma City.

Oklahoma State won the team championship with 91.25 points, their 28th team title, and had two individual champions.

Tim Krieger of Iowa State was named the Most Outstanding Wrestler and Mike Cole of Clarion received the Gorriaran Award.

== Team results ==
Rank	School	Points
1	Oklahoma State	91.25
2	Arizona State	70.5
3	Iowa State	63
4	Oklahoma	61
5	Michigan	53.25
6	Iowa	52.5
7	Minnesota	45.75
8	Northwestern	40.5
9	Edinboro	40
10	Penn State	39.75

== Individual finals ==
Weight class	Championship match (champion in boldface)
118 lbs	**Jack Cuvo**, East Stroudsburg DEC Doug Wyland, North Carolina, 10-8
126 lbs	**Kendall Cross**, Oklahoma State DEC Michael Stokes, North Carolina State, 5-2
134 lbs	**Sean O'Day**, Edinboro DEC T.J. Sewell, Oklahoma, 11-8
142 lbs	**Pat Santoro**, Pittsburgh DEC Junior Saunders, Arizona State, 6-6, 1-1 Cr 11
150 lbs	**Tim Krieger**, Iowa State DEC Karl Monaco, Montclair State, 5-0
158 lbs	**Dan St. John**, Arizona State DEC Joe Pantaleo, Michigan, 1-1, 3-1
167 lbs	**Dave Lee**, Wisconsin MAJ Baron Blakley, Oklahoma, 14-6
177 lbs	**Chris Barnes**, Oklahoma State DEC Brad Lloyd, Lock Haven, 1-1, 2-2 Cr 3
190 lbs	**Eric Voelker**, Iowa State DEC Mark Whitehead, Northwestern, 7-2
275 lbs	**Carlton Haselrig**, Pittsburgh-Johnstown DEC Joel Greenlee, Northern Iowa, 1-0
