= Fred Fozzard =

American wrestler (born 1945)

Personal information
- Born: June 14, 1945 (age 81) Glenwood Springs, Colorado, U.S.
- Home town: Portland, Oregon, U.S.

Sport
- Country: United States
- Sport: Wrestling
- Events: Freestyle and Folkstyle
- College team: Oklahoma State
- Team: USA
- Coached by: Myron Roderick
Medal record
Men's freestyle wrestling
Representing the United States
World Championships
Gold medal – first place	1969 Mar del Plata	82 kg
Collegiate wrestling
Representing the Oklahoma State Cowboys
NCAA Division I Championships
Gold medal – first place	1967 Kent	177 lb
Silver medal – second place	1966 Ames	177 lb
Bronze medal – third place	1968 State College	177 lb

Fred Fozzard (born June 14, 1945) is an American former freestyle and folkstyle wrestler. He won a freestyle World Championship at the 1969 World Championships at 82 kg, becoming the first American wrestler to win a World Championship. He also placed fifth at the 1970 World Championships at 82 kg. As a college wrestler, Fozzard was a three-time All-American and 1967 NCAA wrestling champion at Oklahoma State.

In 2012, Fozzard was inducted into the National Wrestling Hall of Fame as a Distinguished Member.

== Early life and education ==
Fozzard was stricken with polio at the age of two, but overcame the disability through hard work and determination. He attended Marshall High School in Portland, Oregon. As a high school wrestler, he was a two-time Oregon state champion. He then attended Oklahoma State, where he was a three-time All-American and NCAA wrestling champion in 1967. He also would help Oklahoma State win two team NCAA championships, winning in 1966 and 1968.

== Freestyle wrestling career ==
In 1969, Fozzard became the first American to win a World Championship, winning gold at the 1969 World Championships as a freestyle wrestler in Mar Del Plata, Argentina. He was one of two American freestyle wrestlers to win a World Championship in 1969, alongside Rick Sanders. He followed that up with a fifth-place finish at the 1970 World Championships in Edmonton, Canada.
