= Earl McCready =

Canadian wrestler (1908–1983)

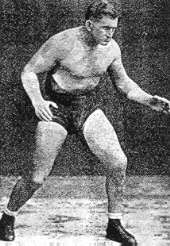
- McCready, circa 1930s

Personal information
- Full name: Earl Gray McCready
- Born: June 15, 1908 Lansdowne, Ontario, Canada
- Died: December 9, 1983 (aged 75) Seattle, Washington, U.S.
- Height: 5 ft 11 in (180 cm)
- Weight: 238 lb (108 kg)

Sport
- Country: Canada
- Sport: Wrestling
- Events: Freestyle and Folkstyle
- College team: Oklahoma A&M
- Coached by: Edward C. Gallagher
- Retired: 1958
Medal record
Men's freestyle wrestling
Representing Canada
British Empire Games
Gold medal – first place	1930 Hamilton	+87 kg
Collegiate Wrestling
Representing Oklahoma A&M
NCAA Championships
Gold medal – first place	1928 Ames	Heavyweight
Gold medal – first place	1929 Columbus	Heavyweight
Gold medal – first place	1930 State College	Heavyweight

Earl Gray McCready (June 15, 1908 – December 9, 1983) was a Canadian amateur and professional wrestler. McCready competed in the U.S. collegiately for Oklahoma A&M, where he was a three-time NCAA champion, the first wrestler ever to do so. As a freestyle wrestler, he competed for his native country of Canada in the 1928 Summer Olympics. In 1930, he won a gold medal in the heavyweight class at the British Empire Games. He soon turned pro shortly after and became a three-time NWA British Empire Heavyweight Champion. McCready was nicknamed 'The Moose' during his wrestling career.

== Personal life ==
McCready was born on June 15, 1908, in Lansdowne, Ontario. He grew up on a farm in open rural area of Saskatchewan in the north regions with Regina as its capital city, Western Canada. During his wrestling career his billed height was 5 feet 11 inches (1.80 m) and 238 pounds (108 kg).

McCready died on December 9, 1983, in Seattle, Washington, United States at the age of 75.

== Career ==
=== Amateur wrestling ===
McCready attracted the attention of Oklahoma State wrestling coaches when he defeated their heavyweight at a 1926 tournament in Canada. McCready would then come to Stillwater, Oklahoma, where he played football and wrestled. In three years of wrestling varsity, the 5'11", 238-pound McCready was 25–0, with all but three of his victories by pin. In 1928, McCready finished sixth in the Olympic Freestyle Heavyweight Tournament.

As an Oklahoma State Cowboy, McCready won three NCAA heavyweight titles (1928–1930), becoming the first three-time NCAA wrestling champion. He was also the first foreign-born NCAA wrestling champion. He is one of only two collegiate wrestlers with three NCAA titles to win all three of his finals matches by pin (the other being Dan Hodge of the University of Oklahoma, 1955–1957). McCready still owns the record of fastest fall in an NCAA final, pinning Ralph Freese of the University of Kansas in just nineteen seconds at the very first NCAA wrestling championships in 1928.

At the 1930 Empire Games, he won the gold medal in the heavyweight class.

=== Professional wrestling ===
Following McCready's graduation from Oklahoma A&M with a degree in physical education, he became a pro wrestler in late 1930, pursuing a professional wrestling career. McCready finished sixth in the Olympic Freestyle Heavyweight Tournament and he won a gold medal in Freestyle as a heavyweight at the first British Empire Games in Hamilton, Ontario, Canada in 1933, also in the same year as well, roughly two years after the start of his career, McCready had defeated the ten year reigning British Empire champion Jack Taylor. McCready worked for Stu Hart's Stampede Wrestling during the 50s.

=== Retirement ===
In the early 1950s McCready became a star of Stu Hart's fledgling Stampede Wrestling promotion. In 1958 McCready fought his last wrestling match at Maple Leaf Gardens in Toronto, Ontario, Canada. He retired from wrestling after a 28-year career in the sport.

== Championships and accomplishments ==
- Canadian Wrestling Hall of Fame
  - Class of 2000
- Dominion Wrestling Union
  - NWA British Empire/Commonwealth Championship (New Zealand version) (2 times)
- George Tragos/Lou Thesz Professional Wrestling Hall of Fame
  - Class of 2005
- National Wrestling Alliance
  - NWA British Empire Heavyweight Championship (Toronto version) (3 times, first)
  - NWA Pacific Coast Heavyweight Championship (San Francisco version) (1 time)
- Professional Wrestling Hall of Fame
  - Class of 2016, "Pioneer" category
- Stampede Wrestling
  - Alberta Tag Team Championship (1 time) - with Ski Hi Lee
  - Stampede Wrestling Hall of Fame (Class of 1995)
- Wrestling Observer Newsletter
  - Wrestling Observer Newsletter Hall of Fame (Class of 1996)
- Other titles:
  - Canadian Heavyweight Championship (2 times)
