= Jack van Bebber =

American wrestler (1907–1986)

Jack VanBebber
Personal information
- Full name: Jack Francis VanBebber
- Born: July 27, 1907 Perry, Oklahoma, U.S.
- Died: April 13, 1986 (aged 78) Oklahoma City, Oklahoma, U.S.

Sport
- Country: United States
- Sport: Wrestling
- Events: Freestyle and Folkstyle
- College team: Oklahoma A&M
- Team: USA
- Coached by: Edward C. Gallagher
Medal record
Men's freestyle wrestling
Representing the United States
Olympic Games
Gold medal – first place	1932 Los Angeles	72 kg
Collegiate Wrestling
Representing Oklahoma A&M
NCAA Championships
Gold medal – first place	1929 Columbus	155 lb
Gold medal – first place	1930 State College	165 lb
Gold medal – first place	1931 Providence	165 lb

Jack Francis "Blackjack" VanBebber (July 27, 1907 – April 13, 1986) was an American wrestler and Olympic gold medalist at the 1932 Olympic Games in freestyle wrestling.

== Biography ==
VanBebber was born and raised in Perry, Oklahoma. He attended and wrestled at Oklahoma A&M University and was a three-time undefeated NCAA national champion. He was coached by Edward C. Gallagher. VanBebber competed at the 1932 Olympic Games in Los Angeles, where he won the gold medal in the freestyle welterweight (72 kg) division.

In 1950, he was named one of the ten greatest amateur athletes in the western hemisphere for the first half of the 20th century. VanBebber served four years in the infantry during World War II, three of them in the Pacific theater. He then joined the Phillips Petroleum Company for 39 years until his retirement, and taught wrestling to sons of company employees and to Boy Scouts. He once wrestled Frank Phillips (founder of Phillips 66) at his home in Bartlesville, Oklahoma.

For more than 50 years he was the only American-born wrestler to win three NCAA titles and an Olympic gold medal. In 1976, he was inducted into the inaugural class of the National Wrestling Hall of Fame as a Distinguished Member.
