= Charles Strack =

American wrestler (1899–1967)

Personal information
- Born: July 15, 1899 Nyack, New York, U.S.
- Died: May 13, 1967 (aged 67) Spring Valley, New York, U.S.

Sport
- Country: United States
- Sport: Wrestling
- Events: Freestyle and Folkstyle
- College team: Oklahoma A&M; Colgate
- Team: USA
- Coached by: Edward C. Gallagher

Charles Strack (July 15, 1899 – May 13, 1967) was an American wrestler. He competed in the freestyle light heavyweight event at the 1924 Summer Olympics.
