= Ross Flood =

American wrestler (1910–1995)

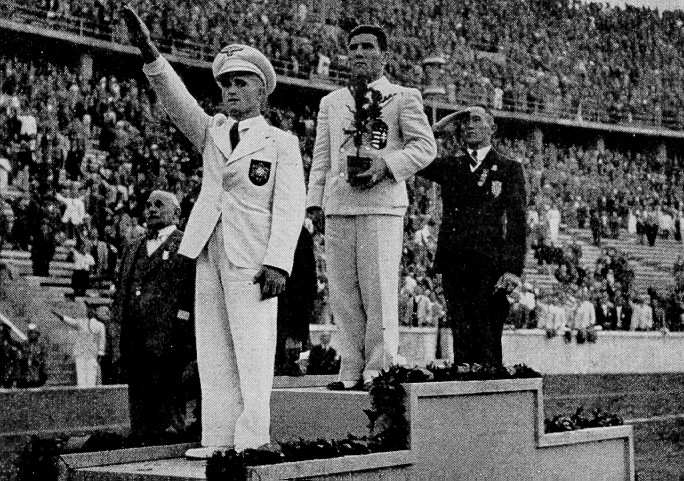
- Flood (far right on podium) at the 1936 Olympics

Personal information
- Full name: Aaron Ross Flood
- Born: December 28, 1910 Braman, Oklahoma, U.S.
- Died: May 23, 1995 (aged 84) Stillwater, Oklahoma, U.S.

Sport
- Country: United States
- Sport: Wrestling
- Events: Freestyle and Folkstyle
- College team: Oklahoma A&M
- Team: USA
- Coached by: Edward C. Gallagher
Medal record
Men's freestyle wrestling
Representing the United States
Olympic Games
Silver medal – second place	1936 Berlin	56 kg
Collegiate Wrestling
Representing Oklahoma A&M
NCAA Championships
Gold medal – first place	1933 Bethlehem	126 lb
Gold medal – first place	1934 Ann Arbor	126 lb
Gold medal – first place	1935 Bethlehem	126 lb

Aaron Ross Flood (December 28, 1910 – May 23, 1995) was an American wrestler who competed in the 1936 Summer Olympics. In 1936, he won a silver medal in the freestyle bantamweight (56 kg) competition. Flood was born in Braman, Oklahoma and died in Stillwater, Oklahoma. In 1978, Flood was inducted into the National Wrestling Hall of Fame as a Distinguished Member.
