= Oklahoma State Cowboys wrestling =

United States university wrestling team

Oklahoma State Cowboys
- University: Oklahoma State University
- Head coach: David Taylor
- Conference: Big 12 Conference
- Location: Stillwater, OK
- Arena: Gallagher-Iba Arena (capacity: 13,611)
- Nickname: Cowboys
- Colors: Orange and black

Team national championships
- 34

National championship years
- 1928, 1929, 1930, 1931, 1933, 1934, 1935, 1937, 1938, 1939, 1940, 1941, 1942, 1946, 1948, 1949, 1954, 1955, 1956, 1958, 1959, 1961, 1962, 1964, 1966, 1968, 1971, 1989, 1990, 1994, 2003, 2004, 2005, 2006

NCAA individual champions
- 148

All-Americans
- 502

Conference Tournament championships
- Southwest: 1917, 1921, 1922, 1923, 1924, 1925 Missouri Valley: 1925, 1926, 1927, 1928 Big Eight: 1959, 1961, 1962, 1963, 1964, 1965, 1966, 1968, 1969, 1971, 1972, 1973, 1974, 1975, 1978, 1983, 1984, 1987, 1988, 1989, 1990, 1991, 1994, 1996 Big 12: 1997, 1998, 2000, 2001, 2003, 2004, 2005, 2006, 2010, 2011, 2013, 2014, 2015, 2016, 2017, 2018, 2019, 2020, 2021, 2025, 2026

The Oklahoma State Cowboys wrestling team is the most successful NCAA Division I athletic program of all time in any sport. As of 2025–26, Oklahoma State wrestling has won 34 team NCAA national championships, 148 individual NCAA national championships, and 502 All-American honors. The Cowboys have also won 57 conference titles, coming in the Southwest, Missouri Valley, Big Eight and Big 12 conferences. The all-time dual record for the program is 1198–141–23.

== History ==
=== Ed Gallagher era (1916–1940) ===
The Oklahoma State wrestling program began in 1914, when A.M. Colville served as the first coach at what was then Oklahoma A&M. The following season in 1916 saw athletic director Edward C. Gallagher taking over as head coach of the team. The team would record its first dual meet win in 1917, defeating Emporia State, 15–10. They went on to pick up another win and a tied decision, to bring the Oklahoma A&M Tigers to a final record of 2–2–1 by the end of the 1910s. Gallagher coached the first NCAA national championship team in 1928, and would lead the team to the first 11 NCAA national championships in school history, as his teams won in 1928, 1929, 1930, 1931, 1933, 1934, 1935, 1937, 1938, 1939, and 1940.

=== Art Griffith era (1941–1956) ===
Art Griffith was hired following Gallagher's death in 1940, after Oklahoma A&M looked to find a coach who could continue their winning tradition and hired Griffith, a longtime coach at Central High School in Tulsa, Oklahoma. In 15 years, Griffith led Central High School to 94 wins in 100 matches, including 50 in a row at one point. Once he arrived in Stillwater, he would pick up right where Gallagher left off, winning eight national championships in 1941, 1942, 1946, 1948, 1949, 1954, 1955 and 1956, while managing to continue two streaks left by Gallagher. First, he extended the four consecutive national championships Gallagher had established to seven consecutive national championships prior to losing to Cornell College in 1947. Second, he extended the 27 consecutive dual meet victory streak to 76, before finally losing in 1951. Griffith's wrestlers won 27 individual championships and were All-Americans 64 times under his leadership. He retired on top after winning three consecutive NCAA Championships and going 78–7–4 for his career, which included ten undefeated seasons.

=== Myron Roderick era (1957–1969) ===
Myron Roderick, one of Griffith's wrestlers, was chosen to immediately succeed his former coach following his retirement in 1956. As a wrestler for Griffith, Roderick went 42–2 and became a three-time All-American and two-time national champion. As head coach, Roderick won his first two national titles in 1958 and 1959, and followed it up with five more national championships in 1961, 1962, 1964, 1966 and 1968. By the end of his career, he had coached seven team champions, 20 individual champions, and 79 All-Americans.

=== Tommy Chesbro era (1970–1984) ===
Tommy Chesbro would take over the program next, and program's dual success continued into the 1970s and 80s. However, the NCAA title dominance ended during this time. Chesbro only won one national title in 1971, in part because his tenure mostly coincided with the sudden rise of Iowa under Dan Gable. Still, Chesbro managed to pass Gallagher as the winningest coach in school history, and his dual mark of 227–26–0 over 16 seasons would remain the best record in the history of the program, until it was surpassed by coach John Smith.

=== Joe Seay era (1985–1991) ===
Joe Seay became the head coach at Oklahoma State University following Chesbro, serving for seven years. Under his leadership, Oklahoma State won two more national titles in 1989 and 1990. During his tenure, Cowboy wrestlers also won seven individual NCAA championships, including John Smith, who won two NCAA titles under Seay’s coaching, and Pat Smith, who later became a four-time NCAA champion.

Seay was suspended with pay in May of 1991, after The NCAA's Committee on Infractions uncovered several major violations. The violations dated to 1985, and included providing cash and other benefits to redshirted wrestlers so they could wrestle in open meets, and employing recruits in summer camps and giving them benefits considered inducements. In addition to the suspension, the Cowboys were banned from postseason competition for the 1992 season and new scholarships were eliminated for the year as well as the next.

=== John Smith era (1991–2024) ===
John Smith took over the Cowboy wrestling program in the wake of NCAA sanctions and probation left over from previous head coach Joe Seay. Smith's first season saw the Cowboys take second at the NCAA Championship, but his second season was crippled by the probation. The Pokes went 4–7 and were banned from post-season competition. But the next season, the Cowboys were back, as top wrestlers who had taken a redshirt year during the probation were back on the mat. Oklahoma State would boast a 13–1 regular season record and go on win the 30th national championship in program history at the 1994 NCAA Championship. The middle part of the 1990s, however, saw the program grow somewhat stagnant, at least by Oklahoma State wrestling standards. Cowboy wrestlers were still winning individual titles and claiming All-American honors while the team was still winning Big Eight and Big 12 Conference crowns, but their team showings at Nationals were somewhat disappointing. Between 1995 and 2002, the Cowboys placed no better than second and finished third three times. But in 2003, Oklahoma State would return to the top once again, winning the Big 12 tournament and NCAA national title and sporting a 17–0 record. It would be the first of four consecutive national championships in 2003, 2004, 2005 and 2006, firmly reestablishing Oklahoma State's dominance in the wrestling world. The Cowboys were at their peak from 2003 to 2006, when they sported a combined record of 55–2. Smith would end his coaching career with five national championships and 490 dual wins at Oklahoma State, the most dual wins ever in school history.

=== David Taylor era (2024–present) ===
David Taylor took over as coach for the 2024–25 season, marking his first year coaching at any level. Under his leadership, the Cowboys secured a 13–1 dual meet record, clinched the Big 12 Conference title with one Big 12 individual champion, and finished 3rd at the NCAA Championship with six All-Americans and two individual national champions. Oklahoma State would follow with a 15–1 regular season in 2025–26, highlighted by a 32–11 victory over Iowa, snapping a six match losing streak. After repeating as Big 12 Conference champions, the Cowboys finished 2nd at the NCAA Championship with eight All-Americans and three individual national champions, becoming the first team in history to record three freshman champions in one year.

=== Big 12 successes ===
Oklahoma State wrestling is known for its consistent success in the annual Big 12 championship tournament. Out of the 31 trophies won throughout the tournament's history, OSU has earned 20 of them. During this event in March 2019, OSU won its seventh Big 12 team title in a row, making this the longest consecutive winning streak ever in Big 12 wrestling. This win also completed OSU's greatest amount of sequential conference tournament wins since their success in the 1920s.

== Current lineup 2026-2027 ==
Weight (Pounds)	Name	Year	Rank
125 lbs.	Troy Spratley	Jr	3
133 lbs.	Jax Forrest	Fr	1
141 lbs.	Jayden Raney	Fr	N/A
149 lbs.	Sergio Vega	So	1
157 lbs.	Landon Robideau	Fr	1
165 lbs.	LaDarion Lockett	Fr	10
174 lbs.	Alex Facundo	Jr	12
184 lbs.	Mikey White	Fr	N/A
197 lbs.	Cody Merril	Fr	2
285 lbs.	Dreshaun Ross	Fr	N/A

== Home meets ==
Home meets are held in the 13,611 seat Gallagher-Iba Arena in Stillwater. The arena is named in part after Oklahoma State's legendary wrestling coach Edward C. Gallagher. Gallagher-Iba was known as Gallagher Hall for nearly five decades until the name was amended to honor former Oklahoma State basketball coach Henry Iba upon the facility's first renovation during the 1987–1988 season. Oklahoma State has held their home wrestling meets in the arena since its completion in 1938. The arena was formally dedicated on February 3, 1939, during a wrestling dual versus Indiana. During the December 9, 2005 Bedlam wrestling dual, a permanently reserved seat for Gallagher was unveiled, adjacent to a reserved seat for Iba.

The arena is a part of the OSU wrestling program. During its first fifty years, the venue developed a reputation regarding the atmosphere of the facility. During the 1978 Big Eight wrestling championships, a crowd of 8,300 was recorded as being loud enough to cause several arena lights to burst. The venue has hosted undefeated home seasons for the program, including 34 seasons without a loss or tie. Due to the home attendance and crowd noise, the arena is nicknamed "Gallagher's House of Horrors."

Gallagher-Iba underwent a massive renovation project in 2000 and 2001, which included an expansion of the seating capacity from 6,381 to the present 13,611. While the expansion project caused attendance at basketball games to almost double, the wrestling crowds have yet to pack the arena to the rafters as they did in the original Gallagher Hall. However, attendance usually spikes when rivals come to Stillwater, most notably the Iowa Hawkeyes, Minnesota Golden Gophers, and Bedlam foe Oklahoma. While the ravenous atmosphere has been somewhat diminished, the renovation project has yielded positives for the Cowboy wrestling program. Among which are the new wrestling center and other new training facilities built inside the athletics center, much to the benefit all OSU student-athletes.

== Bedlam Series ==
The wrestling rivalry between Oklahoma State University and University of Oklahoma, referred to as "the Bedlam Series," began in 1920. The term 'bedlam' is said to have originated from a heated wrestling dual in Stillwater at Gallagher Hall. As the story goes, a newspaper writer was said to have emerged from the building exclaiming to others outside, "It's bedlam in there!"

Oklahoma State maintains a higher record in the rivalry, with a 153–27–10 record through the 2024–25 season. Oklahoma has won seven team national championships in its history, while Oklahoma State has won 34 team national titles.

== Dan Hodge Trophy winners ==
- 2005 – Steve Mocco
- 2016 – Alex Dieringer
- 2025 – Wyatt Hendrickson

== Individual NCAA champions ==
Individual NCAA Champions
Year	Name	Weight Class
1928	Harold DeMarsh	125
1928	Melvin Clodfelter	145
1928	George Rule	175
1928	Earl McCready	Hwt.
1929	George Bancroft	135
1929	Jack VanBebber	165
1929	Conrad Caldwell	175
1929	Earl McCready	Hwt.
1930	Jack VanBebber	165
1930	Conrad Caldwell	175
1930	Earl McCready	Hwt.
1931	Bobby Pearce	126
1931	Leroy McGuirk	155
1931	Jack VanBebber	165
1931	Conrad Caldwell	175
1933	Rex Peery	118
1933	Ross Flood	126
1933	Alan Kelley	145
1934	Rex Peery	118
1934	Ross Flood	126
1934	Alan Kelley	145
1935	Rex Peery	118
1935	Ross Flood	126
1935	Frank Lewis	155
1936	Harley (Doc) Strong	145
1937	Joe McDaniel	118
1937	Stanley Henson	145
1937	Harvey Base	165
1937	Loyd Ricks	Hwt.
1938	Joe McDaniel	118
1938	Stanley Henson	145
1938	Dale Scriven	155
1939	Joe McDaniel	121
1939	Stanley Henson	155
1939	John Harrell	Hwt.
1940	Al Whitehurst	136
1940	Vernon Logan	155
1941	Al Whitehurst	136
1941	David Arndt	145
1941	Earl VanBebber	155
1941	Virgil Smith	165
1942	David Arndt	145
1942	Vernon Logan	155
1942	Virgil Smith	165
1942	Loyd Arms	Hwt.
1946	David Arndt	136
1946	George Dorsch	175
1947	Richard Hutton	Hwt.
1948	Jack St. Clair	155
1948	Richard Hutton	Hwt.
1949	Charles Hetrick	128
1949	Jim Gregson	175
1950	Richard Hutton	Hwt.
1951	George Layman	137
1951	Grover Rains	177
1952	George Layman	137
1952	Gene Nicks	Hwt.
1953	Ned Blass	177
1954	Myron Roderick	137
1954	Ned Blass	177
1954	Gene Nicks	Hwt.
1955	Myron Roderick	130
1955	Fred Davis	167
1956	Myron Roderick	130
1957	Doug Blubaugh	157
1958	Richard Beattie	157
1958	Duane Murty	167
1959	Richard Beattie	157
1959	Ted Ellis	Hwt.
1961	Phil Kinyon	157
1961	Bob Johnson	177
1962	Masaaki Hatta	123
1962	Ronnie Clinton	167
1962	Bob Johnson	177

Individual NCAA Champions
Year	Name	Weight Class
1964	Yojiro Uetake	130
1964	Joe James	Hwt.
1965	Tadaaki Hatta	115
1965	Yojiro Uetake	130
1965	Jack Brisco	191
1966	Yojiro Uetake	130
1966	Gene Davis	137
1966	Bill Harlow	190
1967	Fred Fozzard	177
1968	Dwayne Keller	123
1970	Dwayne Keller	126
1970	Darrell Keller	134
1970	Geoff Baum	190
1971	Yoshiro Fujita	126
1971	Darrell Keller	142
1971	Geoff Baum	177
1975	Ron Ray	167
1976	Jimmy Jackson	Hwt.
1977	Steve Barrett	142
1977	Jimmy Jackson	Hwt.
1978	Jimmy Jackson	Hwt.
1979	Eric Wais	190
1980	Lee Roy Smith	142
1980	Ricky Stewart	158
1981	Ricky Stewart	158
1983	Clar Anderson	134
1983	Mike Sheets	167
1984	Kenny Monday	150
1984	Mike Sheets	167
1987	John Smith	134
1988	John Smith	134
1989	Kendall Cross	126
1989	Chris Barnes	177
1990	Pat Smith	158
1990	Chris Barnes	177
1991	Pat Smith	158
1992	Pat Smith	158
1994	Alan Fried	142
1994	Pat Smith	158
1994	Mark Branch	167
1995	J.J. McGrew	190
1997	Eric Guerrero	126
1997	Mark Branch	167
1998	Teague Moore	118
1998	Eric Guerrero	126
1999	Eric Guerrero	133
2001	Mark Munoz	197
2002	Johnny Thompson	133
2003	Johnny Thompson	133
2003	Jake Rosholt	184
2004	Chris Pendleton	174
2005	Zack Esposito	149
2005	Johny Hendricks	165
2005	Chris Pendleton	174
2005	Jake Rosholt	197
2005	Steve Mocco	285
2006	Johny Hendricks	165
2006	Jake Rosholt	197
2008	Coleman Scott	133
2011	Jordan Oliver	133
2013	Jordan Oliver	149
2013	Chris Perry	174
2014	Alex Dieringer	157
2014	Chris Perry	174
2015	Alex Dieringer	165
2016	Dean Heil	141
2016	Alex Dieringer	165
2017	Dean Heil	141
2021	A.J. Ferrari	197
2025	Dean Hamiti, Jr.	174
2025	Wyatt Hendrickson	Hwt.
2026	Jax Forrest	133
2026	Sergio Vega	141
2026	Landon Robideau	157

== Olympians ==
Oklahoma State wrestlers in the Olympics
Year	Name	Country	Style	Weight Class	Place
1924 Paris	Guy Lookabaugh	United States	Freestyle	72 kg	7th
1924 Paris	Charles Strack	United States	Freestyle	87 kg	11th
1928 Amsterdam	Clarence Berryman	United States	Freestyle	67.5 kg	6th
1928 Amsterdam	Earl McCready	Canada	Freestyle	+87 kg	6th
1932 Los Angeles	Melvin Clodfelter	United States	Freestyle	67.5 kg	DNP
1932 Los Angeles	Robert Pearce	United States	Freestyle	56 kg	Gold
1932 Los Angeles	Jack van Bebber	United States	Freestyle	72 kg	Gold
1936 Berlin	George Chiga	Canada	Freestyle	+87 kg	DNP
1936 Berlin	Roy Dunn	United States	Freestyle	+87 kg	DNP
1936 Berlin	Ross Flood	United States	Freestyle	56 kg	Silver
1936 Berlin	Frank Lewis	United States	Freestyle	72 kg	Gold
1936 Berlin	Doc Strong	United States	Freestyle	67.5 kg	6th
1948 London	Dick Hutton	United States	Freestyle	+87 kg	DNP
1948 London	Billy Jernigan	United States	Freestyle	52 kg	DNP
1948 London	Hal Moore	United States	Freestyle	62 kg	6th
1956 Melbourne	Myron Roderick	United States	Freestyle	62 kg	4th
1960 Rome	Douglas Blubaugh	United States	Freestyle	73 kg	Gold
1960 Rome	Shelby Wilson	United States	Freestyle	67 kg	Gold
1964 Tokyo	Bobby Douglas	United States	Freestyle	63 kg	4th
1964 Tokyo	Yojiro Uetake	Japan	Freestyle	57 kg	Gold
1968 Mexico City	Bobby Douglas	United States	Freestyle	63 kg	DNP
1968 Mexico City	Harry Geris	Canada	Freestyle	+97 kg	DNP
1968 Mexico City	Yojiro Uetake	Japan	Freestyle	57 kg	Gold
1968 Mexico City	Harry Geris	Canada	Greco-Roman	+97 kg	DNP
1972 Munich	Gene Davis	United States	Freestyle	62 kg	DNP
1972 Munich	Harry Geris	Canada	Freestyle	100 kg	DNP
1972 Munich	Jay Robinson	United States	Greco-Roman	82 kg	DNP
1976 Montreal	Gene Davis	United States	Freestyle	62 kg	Bronze
1976 Montreal	Harry Geris	Canada	Freestyle	+100 kg	DNP
1976 Montreal	Jimmy Jackson	United States	Freestyle	+100 kg	DNP
1984 Los Angeles	Dave Schultz	United States	Freestyle	74 kg	Gold
1988 Seoul	Kenny Monday	United States	Freestyle	74 kg	Gold
1988 Seoul	John Smith	United States	Freestyle	62 kg	Gold
1992 Barcelona	Kendall Cross	United States	Freestyle	57 kg	6th
1992 Barcelona	Kenny Monday	United States	Freestyle	74 kg	Silver
1992 Barcelona	John Smith	United States	Freestyle	62 kg	Gold
1996 Atlanta	Kendall Cross	United States	Freestyle	57 kg	Gold
1996 Atlanta	Kenny Monday	United States	Freestyle	74 kg	6th
2004 Athens	Daniel Cormier	United States	Freestyle	96 kg	4th
2004 Athens	Eric Guerrero	United States	Freestyle	60 kg	16th
2004 Athens	Jamill Kelly	United States	Freestyle	66 kg	Silver
2008 Beijing	Daniel Cormier	United States	Freestyle	96 kg	18th
2008 Beijing	Steve Mocco	United States	Freestyle	120 kg	6th
2012 London	Coleman Scott	United States	Freestyle	60 kg	Bronze

== Notable Oklahoma State wrestlers ==
- Loyd Arms – NCAA Champion and three-time All-American, former NFL player
- Clarence Berryman – Olympian in freestyle wrestling at the 1928 Summer Olympics
- Obe Blanc – US World Team member in freestyle wrestling in 2010 and NCAA wrestling head coach
- Douglas Blubaugh – Olympic gold medalist in freestyle wrestling at 1960 Summer Olympics, NCAA Champion
- Jack Brisco – NCAA Champion and two-time All-American, professional wrestler
- George Chiga – NCAA finalist and Olympian in freestyle wrestling at the 1936 Summer Olympics
- Melvin Clodfelter – NCAA Champion and freestyle wrestling Olympian at 1932 Summer Olympics
- Daniel Cormier – UFC Light-Heavyweight and Heavyweight Champion, UFC color commentator, former NCAA national finalist and member of two US freestyle wrestling Olympic teams in 2004 and 2008
- Kendall Cross – Olympic gold medalist in freestyle wrestling at 1996 Summer Olympics, NCAA Champion and three-time All-American
- Randy Couture – two-time UFC Champion and UFC Hall of Famer
- Kyle Crutchmer – MMA fighter and two-time NCAA All-American
- Gene Davis – Olympic bronze medalist in freestyle wrestling at 1976 Summer Olympics, NCAA Champion and three-time All-American
- Harold DeMarsh – first ever NCAA Wrestling Champion in 1928
- Alex Dieringer – three-time NCAA Champion and four-time All-American, 2016 Dan Hodge Trophy winner
- Bobby Douglas – two-time World medalist in freestyle wrestling
- Roy Dunn – Olympian in freestyle wrestling at the 1936 Summer Olympics
- Tom Erikson – MMA fighter and two-time NCAA All-American
- Daton Fix – Junior World Champion, World silver medalist in 2021, four-time NCAA runner-up and five-time All-American
- Ross Flood – Olympic silver medalist at 1936 Summer Olympics, three-time NCAA Champion
- Fred Fozzard – World Champion in freestyle wrestling, NCAA Champion and three-time All-American
- Alan Fried – NCAA Champion and the first four-time USA Junior Freestyle Champion
- Don Frye – UFC fighter, member of UFC Hall of Fame
- Harry Geris – Olympic wrestler for Canada, NCAA All-American
- Eddie Griffin – member of two Oklahoma State NCAA Champion wrestling teams, later served as a collegiate wrestling head coach and athletic director
- Eric Guerrero – three-time NCAA Champion and four-time All-American, Olympian in freestyle wrestling at the 2004 Summer Olympics
- Bill Harlow – World silver medalist, NCAA Champion and three-time finalist
- Dean Heil – two-time NCAA Champion and three-time All-American
- Johny Hendricks – UFC Welterweight Champion, two-time NCAA Champion and four-time All-American
- Wyatt Hendrickson – NCAA Champion and 2025 Dan Hodge Trophy winner at OSU
- Dick Hutton – three-time NCAA Champion and four-time finalist, Olympian in freestyle wrestling at 1948 Summer Olympics
- Jimmy Jackson – three-time NCAA Champion, freestyle wrestling Olympian at 1976 Summer Olympics
- Billy Jernigan – two-time NCAA All-American, freestyle wrestling Olympian at 1948 Summer Olympics
- Cliff Keen – head wrestling coach at University of Michigan from 1925 to 1970
- Jamill Kelly – Olympic silver medalist in freestyle wrestling at 2004 Summer Olympics, two-time NCAA qualifier
- Muhammed Lawal – NCAA All-American wrestler and former OSU assistant coach
- Frank Lewis – Olympic gold medalist in freestyle wrestling at 1936 Summer Olympics, NCAA Champion and two-time finalist
- Guy Lookabaugh – Olympian in freestyle wrestling at the 1924 Summer Olympics
- Sidney Marks – NCAA All-American and Major General in the United States Army
- John Mason – College football head coach
- Earl McCready – first ever three-time NCAA Champion
- Leroy McGuirk – NCAA Champion and two-time finalist, professional wrestler and promoter
- Steve Mocco – MMA fighter, Olympian in freestyle wrestling at 2008 Summer Olympics, NCAA Champion and two-time finalist at OSU
- Kenny Monday – NCAA Champion, two-time Olympic medalist, gold medalist at 1988 Summer Olympics in freestyle wrestling
- Hal Moore – Olympian in freestyle wrestling at the 1948 Summer Olympics, NCAA finalist
- Teague Moore – NCAA Champion and three-time All-American, collegiate wrestling head coach
- Mark Muñoz – UFC Middleweight fighter, NCAA Champion and two-time All-American
- Ray Murphy Jr. – All-American, awarded the 1998 Medal of Courage from the National Wrestling Hall of Fame
- Jordan Oliver – two-time NCAA Champion and four-time All-American, 2019 US National Champion and 2020 US Olympic Team Trials champion in freestyle wrestling
- Robert Pearce – Olympic gold medalist in freestyle wrestling at 1932 Summer Olympics, NCAA Champion and two-time finalist
- Chris Pendleton – two-time NCAA Champion and three-time All-American
- Nick Piccininni – MMA fighter and two-time NCAA All-American
- Jay Robinson – Olympian in Greco-Roman wrestling at the 1972 Summer Olympics
- Myron Roderick – Olympic freestyle wrestler at 1956 Summer Olympics, three-time NCAA Champion, won seven NCAA team championships as head coach of OSU
- Shane Roller – Former WEC and UFC Lightweight fighter
- Jake Rosholt – MMA fighter and three-time NCAA Champion
- Jared Rosholt – UFC fighter and 2010 NCAA finalist
- Jerrod Sanders – MMA fighter and NCAA All-American
- Dave Schultz – Olympic gold medalist in freestyle wrestling at 1984 Summer Olympics, World Champion and six-time World medalist, NCAA All-American at OSU
- Coleman Scott – NCAA Champion and four-time All-American, bronze medalist at 2012 Summer Olympics in freestyle wrestling
- John Smith – six-time consecutive champion at the World and Olympic level with two Olympic gold medals (1988 and 1992) and four World Championships. Two-time NCAA Champion as an OSU wrestler and five-time National Championship head coach of the Cowboy Wrestling program.
- Lee Roy Smith – older brother to John and Pat Smith, World silver medalist, NCAA champion and three-time All-American
- Pat Smith – younger brother of Lee Roy and John Smith, first ever four-time NCAA Division I Champion
- Charles Strack – Olympian in freestyle wrestling at the 1924 Summer Olympics
- Doc Strong – Olympian in freestyle wrestling at the 1936 Summer Olympics, NCAA Champion
- Yojiro Uetake – two-time Olympic gold medalist in freestyle wrestling at 1964 and 1968 Summer Olympics for Japan, three-time undefeated NCAA Champion
- Jack van Bebber – Olympic gold medalist in freestyle wrestling at 1932 Summer Olympics, three-time NCAA Champion
- John Ward – former NFL player, NCAA wrestling and football All-American at OSU
- Shelby Wilson – Olympic gold medalist in freestyle wrestling at 1960 Summer Olympics, two-time NCAA finalist

== See also ==
- National Wrestling Hall of Fame and Museum
