= Yojiro Uetake =

Japanese wrestler (born 1943)

Personal information
- Native name: 上武 洋次郎
- Nationality: Japan
- Born: January 12, 1943 (age 83) Ora, Japan

Sport
- Country: Japan
- Sport: Wrestling
- Events: Freestyle and Folkstyle
- College team: Oklahoma State
Medal record
Men's freestyle wrestling
Representing Japan
Olympic Games
| Gold medal – first place | 1964 Tokyo | 57 kg |
| Gold medal – first place | 1968 Mexico City | 57 kg |
Collegiate Wrestling
Representing the Oklahoma State Cowboys
NCAA Division I Championships
| Gold medal – first place | 1964 Ithaca | 130 lb |
| Gold medal – first place | 1965 Laramie | 130 lb |
| Gold medal – first place | 1966 Ames | 130 lb |

Yojiro Uetake (上武 洋次郎, Uetake Yōjirō; born January 12, 1943) is a Japanese wrestler and two-time Olympic champion in freestyle wrestling. He went undefeated for the entirety of his college career, winning three consecutive NCAA Championships. Uetake was inducted into the National Wrestling Hall of Fame in Stillwater, Oklahoma as a Distinguished Member in 1980. In 2005, he was inducted into the FILA Hall of Fame. He was inducted into the Oklahoma Sports Hall of Fame in 2015.

== Life and career ==
Uetake had originally hoped to learn judo, but was considered too light. He later went on to become a high school wrestling national champion in Japan. The commissioner of the Japanese Wrestling Federation sent Uetake to the Oklahoma State University as a promise to head coach Myron Roderick. Roderick considered him "by far the best wrestler he ever saw or coached". While at Oklahoma State, Uetake was a three-time undefeated NCAA Champion. Later, Uetake went back to Japan as a coach.

=== Olympics ===
Uetake competed at the 1964 Summer Olympics in Tokyo where he won a gold medal in Freestyle wrestling in the bantamweight class.

He also won a gold medal at the 1968 Summer Olympics. Despite suffering a separated shoulder in the second round while trailing 0–2, Uetake managed to even the score at 2-2 and ended up with the gold medal in the 57 kg division.
