= 1956 NCAA wrestling championships =

American collegiate wrestling tournament

1956 NCAA Wrestling Championships
Tournament information
- Sport: College wrestling
- Location: Stillwater, Oklahoma
- Dates: March 1956–March 1956
- Host(s): Oklahoma A&M
- Venue(s): Gallagher Hall

Final positions
- Champions: Oklahoma A&M (19th title)
- 1st runners-up: Oklahoma
- 2nd runners-up: Pittsburgh
- MVP: Dan Hodge (Oklahoma)

The 1956 NCAA Wrestling Championships were the 26th NCAA Wrestling Championships to be held. Oklahoma A&M in Stillwater, Oklahoma hosted the tournament at Gallagher Hall.

Oklahoma A&M took home the team championship with 65 points and having one individual champion.

Dan Hodge of Oklahoma was named the Most Outstanding Wrestler.

== Team results ==
Rank	School	Points
1	Oklahoma A&M	65
2	Oklahoma	62
3	Pittsburgh	51
4	Iowa	43
5	Penn State	27
6	Lehigh	25
7	Colorado State	24
T-8	Michigan State	20
T-8	Illinois	20
10	Purdue	13

== Individual finals ==
Weight class	Championship match (champion in boldface)
115 lbs	**Terry McCann**, Iowa DEC Bill Hulings, Pittsburgh, 6–0
123 lbs	**Ed Peery**, Pittsburgh DEC Harmon Leslie, Oklahoma A&M, 7–5
130 lbs	**Myron Roderick**, Oklahoma A&M DEC Bobby Lyons, Oklahoma, 3–2
137 lbs	**Jim Sinadinos**, Michigan State DEC Ron Day, Colorado State, 4–3
147 lbs	**Eddie Eichelberger**, Lehigh DEC Dave Adams, Penn State, 6–2
157 lbs	**Larry TenPas**, Illinois DEC Doug Blubaugh, Oklahoma A&M, 4–3
167 lbs	**Ed DeWitt**, Pittsburgh DEC Fred Davis, Oklahoma A&M, 5–4
177 lbs	**Dan Hodge**, Oklahoma WBF Roy Minter, Minnesota State, 1:37
191 lbs	**Ken Leuer**, Iowa DEC Jim Gregson, Oklahoma A&M, 5–3
UNL	**Gordon Roesler**, Oklahoma RD Bob Konovsky, Wisconsin, 4–4
