= 1954 NCAA wrestling championships =

American collegiate wrestling tournament

1954 NCAA Wrestling Championships
Tournament information
- Sport: College wrestling
- Location: Norman, Oklahoma
- Dates: March 26, 1954–March 27, 1954
- Host: University of Oklahoma
- Venue: McCasland Field House

Final positions
- Champions: Oklahoma A&M (17th title)
- 1st runners-up: Pittsburgh
- 2nd runners-up: Penn State
- MVP: Tommy Evans (Oklahoma)

The 1954 NCAA Wrestling Championships were the 24th NCAA Wrestling Championships to be held. The University of Oklahoma in Norman, Oklahoma hosted the tournament at McCasland Field House.

Oklahoma A&M took home the team championship with 32 points and having three individual champions.

Tommy Evans of Oklahoma was named the Most Outstanding Wrestler.

== Team results ==
Rank	School	Points
1	Oklahoma A&M	32
2	Pittsburgh	17
3	Penn State	13
T-4	Navy	12
T-4	Iowa	12
6	Michigan State	11
T-7	Michigan	10
T-7	Oklahoma	10
9	Lehigh	9
10	Syracuse	6

== Individual finals ==
Weight class	Championship match (champion in boldface)
115 lbs	**Hugh Peery**, Pittsburgh DEC Charles Ofsthun, Minnesota, 9–2
123 lbs	**Dick Govig**, Iowa DEC Joe Lobaugh, Oklahoma A&M, 5–1
130 lbs	**Norvard Nalan**, Michigan DEC Jim Howard, Ithaca, 6–1
137 lbs	**Myron Roderick**, Oklahoma A&M DEC Eddie Eichelberger, Lehigh, 8–4
147 lbs	**Tommy Evans**, Oklahoma WBF Donald Thompson, Oklahoma A&M, 4:15
157 lbs	**Bob Hoke**, Michigan State DEC Ed Rooney, Syracuse, 11–6
167 lbs	**Joe Solomon**, Pittsburgh DEC Ernie Fischer, Maryland, 6–2
177 lbs	**Ned Blass**, Oklahoma A&M DEC Royal Smith, Colorado, 5–4
191 lbs	**Peter Blair**, Navy DEC Joe Comly, Lehigh, 10–5
UNL	**Gene Nicks**, Oklahoma A&M DEC Bob Konovsky, Wisconsin, 7–0
