= 1955 NCAA wrestling championships =

American collegiate wrestling tournament

1955 NCAA Wrestling Championships
Tournament information
- Sport: College wrestling
- Location: Ithaca, New York
- Dates: March 1955–March 1955
- Host(s): Cornell University
- Venue(s): Barton Hall

Final positions
- Champions: Oklahoma A&M (18th title)
- 1st runners-up: Penn State
- 2nd runners-up: Pittsburgh
- MVP: Eddie Eichelberger (Lehigh)

The 1955 NCAA Wrestling Championships were the 25th NCAA Wrestling Championships to be held. Cornell University in Ithaca, New York hosted the tournament at Barton Hall.

Oklahoma A&M took home the team championship with 40 points and having two individual champions.

Eddie Eichelberger of Lehigh was named the Most Outstanding Wrestler.

== Team results ==
Rank	School	Points
1	Oklahoma A&M	40
2	Penn State	31
3	Pittsburgh	28
4	Oklahoma	26
5	Lehigh	25
6	Iowa	24
7	Michigan	23
8	Navy	21
9	Illinois	19
10	Colorado	15

== Individual finals ==
Weight class	Championship match (champion in boldface)
115 lbs	**Terry McCann**, Iowa WBF Dave Bowlin, Oklahoma A&M, 7:06
123 lbs	**Ed Peery**, Pittsburgh WBF Lewis Guidi, West Virginia, 8:30
130 lbs	**Myron Roderick**, Oklahoma A&M MAJOR Bobby Lyons, Oklahoma, 13–2
137 lbs	**Larry Fornicola**, Penn State DEC Andrew Kaul, Michigan, 6–0
147 lbs	**Eddie Eichelberger**, Lehigh WBF Lloyd Corwin, Cornell College, 6:43
157 lbs	**Bill Weick**, Northern Iowa DEC Mike Rodriguez, Michigan, 6–4
167 lbs	**Fred Davis**, Oklahoma A&M DEC Larry TenPas, Illinois, 9–2
177 lbs	**Dan Hodge**, Oklahoma WBF Joe Krufka, Penn State, 4:23
191 lbs	**Peter Blair**, Navy WBF Ken Leuer, Iowa, 5:01
UNL	**Bill Oberly**, Penn State DEC Werner Seel, Lehigh, 5–3
