= Art Griffith =

American wrestling coach

- Born: May 25, 1894
- Died: November 12, 1976 (aged 82)
- Occupation: Wrestling coach
- Known for: Coaching at Oklahoma State University, innovating wrestling techniques, and introducing the point scoring system

Art Griffith (May 25, 1894 – November 12, 1976) was a prominent American wrestling coach renowned for his significant contributions to the sport at both high school and collegiate levels. Over a distinguished 30-year coaching career, Griffith's teams participated in 77 tournaments, consistently securing at least one gold medal in each.

== Early life and high school coaching career ==
Griffith began his coaching tenure at Central High School in Tulsa, Oklahoma, where he started the program in 1926 and led the wrestling program for 15 years. During this period, his teams achieved remarkable success, winning 94 out of 100 matches, including a streak of 50 consecutive victories. Under his guidance, Central High secured 10 Oklahoma state championships and emerged undefeated in 12 seasons. Notably, his teams won the only two national high school wrestling tournaments ever conducted.

== Collegiate coaching at Oklahoma State University ==
In 1941, Griffith succeeded Edward C. Gallagher as the head wrestling coach at Oklahoma State University (then Oklahoma A&M). Over 13 seasons, he solidified the university's wrestling dominance by leading the Cowboys to eight NCAA championships. His teams amassed 78 dual meet victories against seven losses and four ties, with 10 seasons remaining undefeated. Under his mentorship, 27 of his wrestlers clinched individual NCAA titles.

Upon taking the helm, Griffith inherited a team with a 27-match winning streak, which he extended to a record 76 consecutive victories before a loss in 1951. He also served as the U.S. Olympic wrestling coach in 1948, further cementing his legacy in the sport.

== Olympics ==
Griffith was the U.S. Olympic wrestling coach in 1948.

== Innovations and coaching philosophy ==
Griffith was instrumental in evolving the sport of wrestling. He introduced a dynamic style characterized by constant motion, emphasizing that movement was essential to exploit opponents' weaknesses. He believed, "Every technique has its weakness, but you can't exploit that weakness by standing still. You must move, and you must force your opponent to move with you."

Another of his significant contributions was the development of the point scoring system for wrestling bouts. Prior to this innovation, matches were determined solely by falls or time advantage. Griffith's system provided a more comprehensive method of evaluating wrestlers' performances, leading to broader adoption nationwide.

== Legacy and honors ==
Griffith's impact on wrestling is profound. In the 1941 National Collegiate finals, 14 out of 16 finalists had been coached by him at either the high school or college level, showcasing his widespread influence. In recognition of his contributions, he was honored as a Distinguished Member of the National Wrestling Hall of Fame in the inaugural class of 1976. He was inducted into the Oklahoma Sports Hall of Fame in 2002.
