= 1990 NCAA Division I Wrestling Championships =

NCAA championship

Tournament information
- Sport: College wrestling
- Location: College Park, Maryland
- Dates: March 22, 1990–March 24, 1990
- Host: University of Maryland
- Venue: Jones-Hill House

Final positions
- Champions: Oklahoma State (29th title)
- 1st runners-up: Arizona State
- 2nd runners-up: Iowa
- MVP: Chris Barnes (Oklahoma State)

The 1990 NCAA Division I Wrestling Championships were the 60th NCAA Division I Wrestling Championships to be held. Maryland University in College Park hosted the tournament. The tournament was held at the Jones-Hill House.

Oklahoma State won the team championship with 117.75 points, their 29th team title, and had two individual champions.

Chris Barnes of Oklahoma State was named the Most Outstanding Wrestler and Doug Streicher of Iowa received the Gorriaran Award.

== Team results ==
Rank	School	Points
1	Oklahoma State	117.75
2	Arizona State	104.75
3	Iowa	102.75
4	Northwestern	66.75
5	Nebraska	64.25
6	Penn State	57.5
7	Oklahoma	48.25
8	Indiana	45.5
9	Iowa State	43.5
10	Minnesota	42.25

== Individual finals ==
Weight class	Championship match (champion in boldface)
118 lbs	**Jack Griffin**, Northwestern MAJ Zeke Jones, Arizona State, 12–4
126 lbs	**Terry Brands**, Iowa DEC Jason Kelber, Nebraska, 3–2
134 lbs	**Tom Brands**, Iowa DEC Dave Zuniga, Minnesota, 9–7
142 lbs	**Joe Reynolds**, Oklahoma DEC Thom Ortiz, Arizona State, 7–3
150 lbs	**Brian Dolph**, Indiana DEC Gary Steffensmeier, Northern Iowa, 11–5
158 lbs	**Pat Smith**, Oklahoma State DEC Scot Schleicher, Navy, 11–7
167 lbs	**Dan St. John**, Arizona State DEC Brad Traviolia, Northwestern, 6–3
177 lbs	**Chris Barnes**, Oklahoma State MAJ Marty Morgan, Minnesota, 10–2
190 lbs	**Matt Ruppel**, Lehigh DEC Brooks Simpson, Iowa, 6–5
275 lbs	**Kurt Angle**, Clarion DEC Greg Haladay, Penn State, 3–2
