= 2004 NCAA Division I Wrestling Championships =

American collegiate wrestling tournament

Tournament information
- Sport: College wrestling
- Location: St. Louis, Missouri
- Venue: Savvis Center
- Participants: 68

Final positions
- Champions: Oklahoma State (32nd title)
- 1st runners-up: Iowa
- 2nd runners-up: Ohio State
- MVP: Jesse Jantzen (Harvard)

The 2004 NCAA Wrestling Team Championship was hosted in St. Louis, Missouri from March 18–20. Dozens of teams competed for the NCAA team championship, and 330 wrestlers competed for individual honors. The Oklahoma State Cowboys crowned one individual champions Chris Pendleton at 174 pounds. The Cowboys had one other wrestler who qualified as an All-American. The tournament was characterized by the even play amongst teams with no schools claiming multiple individual championships. That being said, it was still a comfortable victory for the Cowboys in the overall points count. It was the 2nd consecutive NCAA tournament victory by the Cowboys, and their 32nd NCAA team wrestling championship overall.

== Team results ==
Rank	School	Points
1	Oklahoma State	123.5
2	Iowa	82
3	Ohio State	77.5
3	Lehigh	76.5
5	Nebraska	74
6	Iowa State	70
7	Illinois	69.5
8	Minnesota	65.5
9	Oklahoma	62.5
10	Michigan	60.5

== Championship finals (with NCAA champions in bold) ==
Weight class	Championship Match (Champion in boldface)
125 lbs	**Jason Powell**, Nebraska vs. Kyle Ott, Illinois, 17–2
133 lbs	**Zach Roberson**, Iowa State vs. Josh Moore, Penn State, 7–3
141 lbs	**Cliff Moore**, Iowa vs. Matt Murray, Nebraska, 5–2
149 lbs	**Jesse Jantzen**, Harvard vs. Zack Esposito, Oklahoma State, 9–3
157 lbs	**Matt Gentry**, Stanford vs. Jake Percival, Ohio, 4–2
165 lbs	**Troy Letters**, Lehigh vs. Tyrone Lewis, Oklahoma State, 5–2
174 lbs	**Chris Pendelton**, Oklahoma State vs. Ben Askren, Missouri, 11–4
184 lbs	**Greg Jones**, West Virginia, vs. Ben Heizer, Northern Illinois, 10–5
197 lbs	**Damion Hahn**, Minnesota vs. Ryan Fulsaas, Iowa, 7–2
285 lbs	**Tommy Rowlands**, Ohio State vs. Pat Cummins, Penn State, 6–2
