= 1942 NCAA wrestling championships =

American collegiate wrestling tournament

1942 NCAA Wrestling Championships
Tournament information
- Sport: College wrestling
- Location: East Lansing, Michigan
- Dates: March 27, 1942–March 28, 1942
- Host(s): Michigan State University
- Venue(s): Jenison Fieldhouse

Final positions
- Champions: Oklahoma A&M (13th title)
- 1st runners-up: Michigan State
- 2nd runners-up: Penn State
- MVP: David Arndt (Oklahoma A&M)

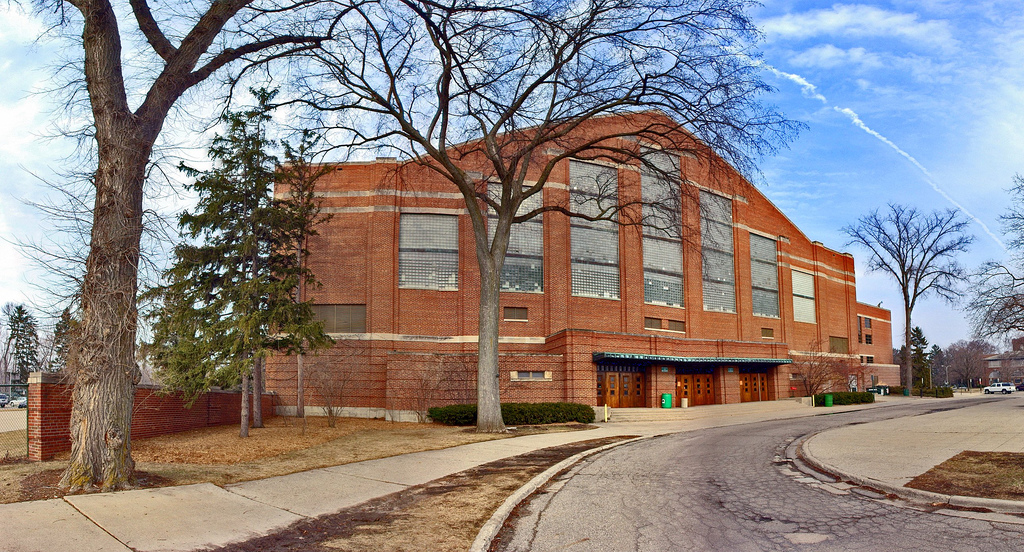
Jenison Fieldhouse, Michigan State University

The 1942 NCAA Wrestling Championships were the 15th NCAA Wrestling Championships to be held. Michigan State University in East Lansing, Michigan hosted the tournament at Jenison Fieldhouse.

Oklahoma A&M took home the team championship with 31 points and having four individual champions.

David Arndt of Oklahoma A&M was named the Outstanding Wrestler.

== Team results ==
Rank	School	Points
1	Oklahoma A&M	31
2	Michigan State	26
3	Penn State	10
4	Michigan	8
T-5	Purdue	7
T-5	Navy	7
T-5	Kent State	7
T-8	Penn	6
T-8	Illinois	6
10	Iowa State Teachers College	5

== Individual finals ==
Weight class	Championship match (champion in boldface)
121 lbs	**Merle Jennings**, Michigan State DEC Malcolm MacDonald, Michigan State, 3–2
128 lbs	**Burl Jennings**, Michigan State DEC Sidney Marks, Oklahoma A&M, 5–3
136 lbs	**Bill Maxwell**, Michigan State WBF Fred Bishop, Cornell College, 5:16
145 lbs	**David Arndt**, Oklahoma A&M MAJOR Manly Johnson, Michigan, 18–5
155 lbs	**Vernon Logan**, Oklahoma A&M DEC Ted Seabrooke, Illinois, 9–3
165 lbs	**Virgil Smith**, Oklahoma A&M DEC Bill Carmichael, Navy, 2–1
175 lbs	**Dick DiBatista**, Penn RD Leon Martin, Iowa State Teachers College, 4–4, 1–1
UNL	**Loyd Arms**, Oklahoma A&M DEC Walter Porowski, Kent State, 7–5
