= 1937 NCAA Wrestling Championships =

American collegiate wrestling tournament

Tournament information
- Sport: College wrestling
- Location: Terre Haute, Indiana
- Dates: March 19, 1937–March 20, 1937
- Host: Indiana State Teachers College
- Venue: Indiana State Teachers College Gymnasium

Final positions
- Champions: Oklahoma A&M (8th title)
- Runner-up: Oklahoma
- MVP: Stanley Henson (Oklahoma A&M)

The 1937 NCAA Wrestling Championships were the 10th NCAA Wrestling Championships to be held. Indiana State Teachers College in Terre Haute, Indiana hosted the tournament at their school gymnasium.

Oklahoma A&M took home the team championship with 31 points and having four individual champions.

Stanley Henson of Oklahoma A&M was named the Outstanding Wrestler.

== Team results ==
Rank	School	Points
1	Oklahoma A&M	31
2	Oklahoma	13
T-3	Iowa State Teachers College	9
T-3	Minnesota	9
5	Illinois	8
6	Cornell College	7
7	Kansas State	5
T-8	Central Oklahoma	4
T-8	Indiana	4
10	Iowa Agricultural College	3

== Individual finals ==
Weight class	Championship match (champion in boldface)
118 lbs	**Joe McDaniel**, Oklahoma A&M TA Davis Natvig, Iowa State Teachers College, 2:15
126 lbs	**Dale Brand**, Cornell College TA Ted Anderson, Central Oklahoma, 1:37
135 lbs	**Ray Cheney**, Iowa State Teachers College RD Fred Parkey, Oklahoma A&M
145 lbs	**Stanley Henson**, Oklahoma A&M TA Jack McIlvoy, Illinois, 8:30
155 lbs	**Bill Keas**, Oklahoma TA Ernest Jessup, Kansas State, 0:45
165 lbs	**Harvey Base**, Oklahoma A&M TA Marshall Word, Oklahoma, 3:40
175 lbs	**John Whitaker**, Minnesota TA John Ginay, Illinois, 6:07
UNL	**Lloyd Ricks**, Oklahoma A&M TA Bob Haak, Indiana, 1:35
