= 1966 NCAA University Division wrestling championships =

American collegiate wrestling tournament

1966 NCAA University Division Wrestling Championships
Tournament information
- Sport: College wrestling
- Location: Ames, Iowa
- Dates: March 24, 1966–March 26, 1966
- Host(s): Iowa State University
- Venue(s): Iowa State Armory

Final positions
- Champions: Oklahoma State (25th title)
- 1st runners-up: Iowa State
- 2nd runners-up: Oklahoma

Tournament statistics
- Attendance: 22,100
- MVP: Yojiro Uetake (Oklahoma State)

The 1966 NCAA University Division Wrestling Championships were the 36th NCAA University Division Wrestling Championships to be held. Iowa State University in Ames, Iowa hosted the tournament at the Iowa State Armory.

Oklahoma State took home the team championship with 79 points despite having three individual champions. Yojiro Uetake of Oklahoma State was named the Most Outstanding Wrestler and Tom Peckham of Iowa State received the Gorriaran Award.

== Team results ==
Rank	School	Points
1	Oklahoma State	79
2	Iowa State	70
3	Oklahoma	69
4	Lehigh	48
5	Michigan	47
6	Michigan State	32
T-7	Lock Haven	22
T-7	East Stroudsburg	22
9	Portland State	21
10	Army	17

== Individual finals ==
Weight class	Championship match (champion in boldface)
115 lbs	**Rick Sanders**, Portland State DEC Ernie Gillum, Iowa State, 9–2
123 lbs	**Mike Caruso**, Lehigh DEC Bob Fehrs, Michigan, 9-6
130 lbs	**Yojiro Uetake**, Oklahoma State WBF Joe Peritore, Lehigh, 4:31
137 lbs	**Gene Davis**, Oklahoma State DEC Mike Sager, Oklahoma, 1–1, 3–2
145 lbs	**Bill Blacksmith**, Lock Haven DEC Dale Bahr, Iowa State, 7–1
152 lbs	**Dick Cook**, Michigan State DEC Joe Bavaro, Gettysburg, 3–0
160 lbs	**Gregory Ruth**, Oklahoma WBF Vic Marcucci, Iowa State, 8:54
167 lbs	**Dave Reinbolt**, Ohio State DEC Roger Mickish, Oklahoma, 13–11
177 lbs	**Tom Peckham**, Iowa State WBF Fred Fozzard, Oklahoma State, 4:43
191 lbs	**Bill Harlow**, Oklahoma State DEC Don Buzzard, Iowa State, 3–2
UNL	**Dave Porter**, Michigan MAJOR Bob Billberg, Minnesota State-Moorhead, 15–4
