= 1930 NCAA Wrestling Championships =

American collegiate wrestling tournament

Tournament information
- Sport: College wrestling
- Location: State College, Pennsylvania
- Dates: March 28, 1930–March 30, 1930
- Host(s): Penn State University
- Venue(s): Rec Hall

Final positions
- Champions: Oklahoma A&M (3rd title)
- 1st runners-up: Illinois
- 2nd runners-up: Oklahoma

The 1930 NCAA Wrestling Championships were the 3rd NCAA Wrestling Championships to be held. Penn State University in State College, Pennsylvania hosted the tournament at Rec Hall.

Oklahoma A&M took home the team championship with 27 points with three individual champions.

== Team results ==
Rank	School	Points
1	Oklahoma A&M	27
2	Illinois	14
3	Oklahoma	12
4	Iowa Agricultural College	7
5	Michigan	6
T-6	MIT	5
T-6	Kansas State Agricultural College	5
T-8	Kansas	4
T-8	Central State Teachers College	4
T-8	Ohio State	4
T-8	Cornell College	4

== Individual finals ==
Weight class	Championship match (champion in boldface)
115 lbs	**Joe Sapora**, Illinois MED FFT Robert Axford, MIT
125 lbs	**Laurance Mantooth**, Oklahoma TA Lyle Morford, Cornell College, 1:49
135 lbs	**Hugh Linn**, Iowa Agricultural College TA Louis Bauerle, Illinois, 5:08
145 lbs	**Hardie Lewis**, Oklahoma TA Arlie Tomlinson, Oklahoma A&M, 1:33
155 lbs	**Otto Kelly**, Michigan TA Bryan Watkins, Central State Teachers College, 6:46
165 lbs	**Jack Van Bebber**, Oklahoma A&M TA Sam Church, Kansas, 7:40
175 lbs	**Conrad Caldwell**, Oklahoma A&M TA OT Floyd Helgerson, Ohio State, 0:58
UNL	**Earl McCready**, Oklahoma A&M WBF Lloyd Burdick, Illinois, 2:17
