= 1934 NCAA Wrestling Championships =

American collegiate wrestling tournament

Tournament information
- Sport: College wrestling
- Location: Ann Arbor, Michigan
- Dates: March 23, 1934–March 24, 1934
- Host(s): University of Michigan
- Venue(s): Yost Fieldhouse

Final positions
- Champions: Oklahoma A&M (6th title)
- 1st runners-up: Indiana
- 2nd runners-up: Oklahoma

The 1934 NCAA Wrestling Championships were the 7th NCAA Wrestling Championships to be held. The University of Michigan in Ann Arbor, Michigan hosted the tournament at Yost Fieldhouse.

Oklahoma A&M took home the team championship with 29 points and three individual champions.

Ben Bishop of Lehigh was named the Outstanding Wrestler.

== Team results ==
Rank	School	Points
1	Oklahoma A&M	29
2	Indiana	19
3	Oklahoma	14
4	Southwestern Oklahoma	12
5	Lehigh	7
6	Springfield	4
T-7	Michigan	3
T-7	Central Oklahoma	3
T-7	Iowa State Teachers College	3
T-10	Washington & Lee	2
T-10	Illinois	2
T-10	Cornell College	2

== Individual finals ==
Weight class	Championship match (champion in boldface)
118 lbs	**Rex Peery**, Oklahoma A&M DEC Alvie Natvig, Iowa State Teachers College
126 lbs	**Ross Flood**, Oklahoma A&M WBF Oliver Cellini, Indiana, 6:55
135 lbs	**Wayne Martin**, Oklahoma WDF Roger Leathers, Springfield
145 lbs	**Alan Kelley**, Oklahoma A&M DEC Arthur Mosier, Michigan
155 lbs	**Ben Bishop**, Lehigh WBF Frank Lewis, Oklahoma A&M, 5:20
165 lbs	**Marion Foreman**, Oklahoma WBF Orville England, Southwestern Oklahoma, 8:22
175 lbs	**Richard Voliva**, Indiana DEC Emil Shellstede, Central Oklahoma
UNL	**Ralph Teague**, Southwestern Oklahoma WBF Otto Kuss, Indiana, 9:16
