= 2003 NCAA Division I Wrestling Championships =

American collegiate wrestling tournament

Tournament information
- Sport: College wrestling
- Location: Kansas City, Missouri
- Dates: March 20, 2003–Marchm22, 2003
- Venue(s): Kemper Arena

Final positions
- Champions: Oklahoma State (31st title)
- 1st runners-up: Minnesota
- 2nd runners-up: Oklahoma
- MVP: Erik Larkin (Arizona State)

The 2003 NCAA Division I Wrestling Championships were the 73rd NCAA Division I Wrestling Championships to be held. The tournament was held at the Kemper Arena in Kansas City, Missouri.

Oklahoma State won the team championship with 143 points, their 31st team title, and had two individual champions.

Eric Larkin of Arizona State was named the Most Outstanding Wrestler and Jason Powell of Nebraska received the Gorriaran Award.

== Team results ==
Rank	School	Points
1	Oklahoma State	143
2	Minnesota	104.5
3	Oklahoma	78
4	Lehigh	69
5	Arizona State	65
6	Penn State	62
7	Michigan	58
8	Iowa	57.5
9	Illinois	53
10	Cornell	52

== Individual finals ==
Weight class	Championship match (champion in boldface)
125 lbs	**Travis Lee**, Cornell DEC Chris Fleegner, Purdue, 6–4
133 lbs	**Johnny Thompson**, Oklahoma State DEC Ryan Lewis, Minnesota, 5–3
141 lbs	**Teyon Ware**, Oklahoma DEC Dylan Long, Northern Iowa, 6–4
149 lbs	**Eric Larkin**, Arizona State DEC Jared Lawrence, Minnesota, 10–8
157 lbs	**Ryan Bertin**, Michigan DEC Alex Tirapelle, Illinois, 7–3
165 lbs	**Matt Lackey**, Illinois DEC Troy Letters, Lehigh, 6–3
174 lbs	**Robbie Waller**, Oklahoma DEC Carl Fronhofer, Pittsburgh, 7–2
184 lbs	**Jake Rosholt**, Oklahoma State MAJ Scott Barker, Missouri, 13–5
197 lbs	**Damion Hahn**, Minnesota DEC John Trenge, Lehigh, 5–4
285 lbs	**Steve Mocco**, Iowa DEC Kevin Hoy, Air Force, 8–3
