= 1941 NCAA wrestling championships =

American collegiate wrestling tournament

1941 NCAA Wrestling Championships
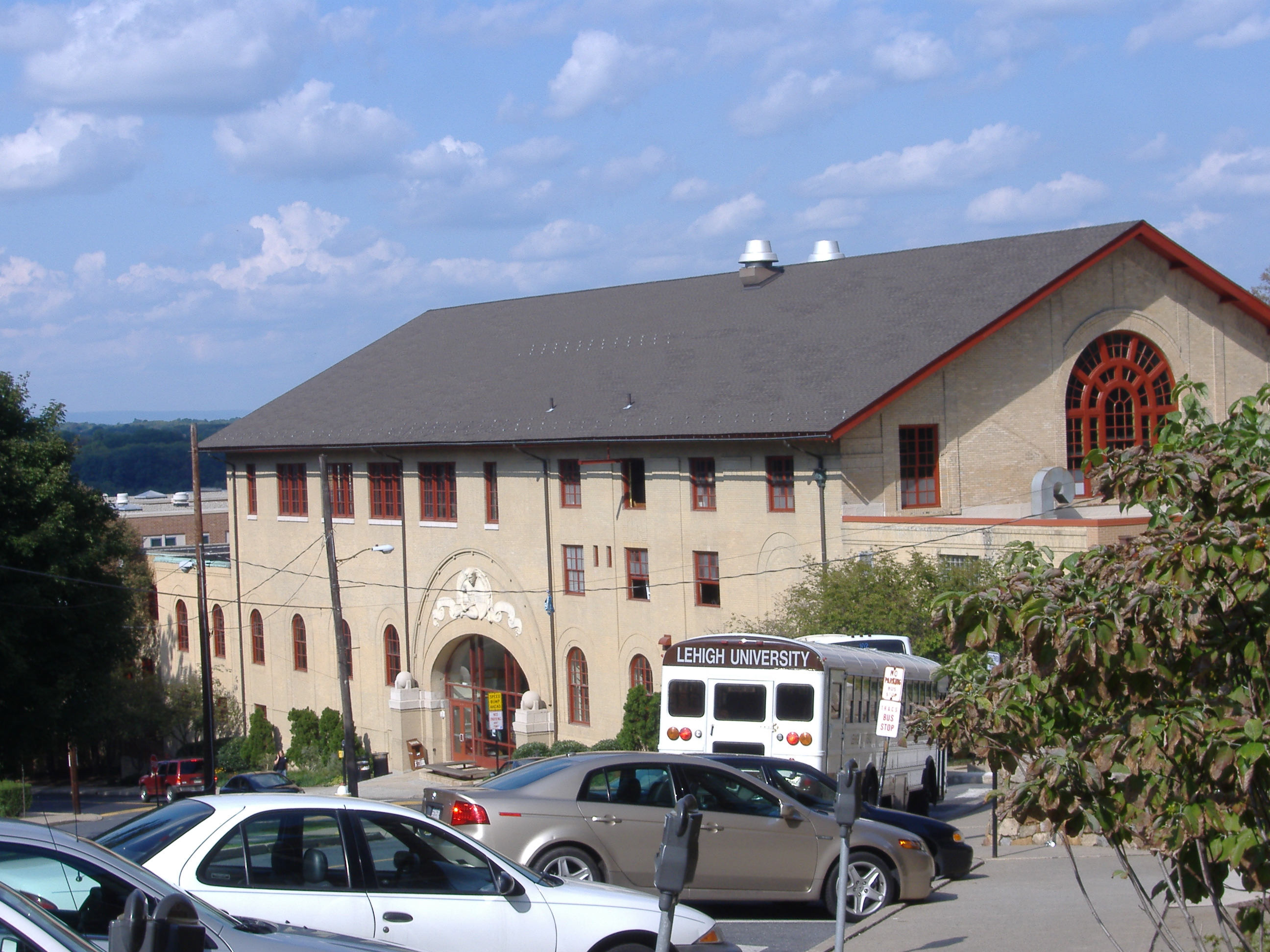
- Taylor Gymnasium at Lehigh University

Tournament information
- Sport: College wrestling
- Location: Bethlehem, Pennsylvania
- Dates: March 21, 1941–March 22, 1941
- Host(s): Lehigh
- Venue(s): Taylor Gymnasium

Final positions
- Champions: Oklahoma A&M (12th title)
- 1st runners-up: Michigan State
- 2nd runners-up: Minnesota
- MVP: Al Whitehurst (Oklahoma A&M)

The 1941 NCAA Wrestling Championships were the 14th NCAA Wrestling Championships to be held. Lehigh in Bethlehem, Pennsylvania hosted the tournament at Taylor Gymnasium.

Oklahoma A&M took home the team championship with 37 points and having four individual champions.

Al Whitehurst of Oklahoma A&M was named the Outstanding Wrestler.

== Team results ==
| Rank | School | Points |
|---|---|---|
| 1 | Oklahoma A&M | 37 |
| 2 | Michigan State | 26 |
| 3 | Minnesota | 12 |
| 4 | Yale | 8 |
| T-5 | Wisconsin | 7 |
| T-5 | Kent State | 7 |
| T-5 | Appalachian State Teachers College | 7 |
| T-8 | Penn | 6 |
| T-8 | Kansas State | 6 |
| T-10 | Iowa State Teachers College | 5 |
| T-10 | Iowa | 5 |
| T-10 | Franklin & Marshall | 5 |

== Individual finals ==
| Weight class | Championship match (champion in boldface) |
|---|---|
| 121 lbs | **Merle Jennings**, Michigan State DEC Calvin Mehlhorn, Oklahoma A&M, 9–5 |
| 128 lbs | **Burl Jennings**, Michigan State MAJOR Mike Slepecky, Kent State, 16–6 |
| 136 lbs | **Al Whitehurst**, Oklahoma A&M DEC Bill Maxwell, Michigan State |
| 145 lbs | **David Arndt**, Oklahoma A&M DEC Vernon Hassman, Iowa State Teachers College, 8–3 |
| 155 lbs | **Earl van Bebber**, Oklahoma A&M DEC Leland Porter, Kansas State, 3–1 |
| 165 lbs | **Virgil Smith**, Oklahoma A&M MAJOR John Roberts, Wisconsin, 11–0 |
| 175 lbs | **Dick DiBatista**, Penn DEC Al Crawford, Appalachian State Teachers College, 5–4 |
| UNL | **Leonard Levy**, Minnesota DEC Larry Pickett, Yale, 5–2 |
