= Joe Seay =

American wrestling coach (1939–2019)

Joe Van Seay
- Born: April 1939
- Died: July 11, 2019 (aged 80)
- Occupation: Wrestling coach
- Known for: Collegiate and international wrestling coaching

Joe Van Seay (April 1939 – July 11, 2019) was an American wrestling coach known for his achievements at the high school, collegiate, and international levels. His coaching methods and leadership led to multiple championships, making a lasting impact on the sport.

== Early life and wrestling career ==
Seay was born in Altus, Oklahoma, and became a standout wrestler in high school, winning a state championship for Wellington High School in Kansas. He competed at Kansas State University, qualifying for the NCAA championships three times (1962–1964). Seay also won three national Greco-Roman titles and placed second twice in freestyle wrestling.

== High school coaching career ==
Seay began his coaching career at Bakersfield South High School in California. Over eight years, he compiled a record of 177 wins, 12 losses, and 2 ties, earning recognition as the national high school Coach of the Year.

== Collegiate coaching career ==
=== Cal State Bakersfield ===
In 1972, Seay moved to collegiate coaching at California State University, Bakersfield. Over 12 seasons, he led the team to seven NCAA Division II national championships, with an overall coaching record of 189-56-2.

=== Oklahoma State University ===
Seay became the head coach at Oklahoma State University in 1985, serving until 1991. Under his leadership, OSU won NCAA Division I team titles in 1989 and 1990. During his tenure, OSU wrestlers won seven individual NCAA championships, including John Smith, who won two NCAA titles under Seay’s coaching, and Pat Smith, who later became a four-time NCAA champion.

== International coaching career ==
Following his collegiate coaching career, Seay played a crucial role in international wrestling. He was the head coach of the U.S. men's freestyle World Teams that won their first-ever Senior World Freestyle title in 1993 and repeated in 1995. He also coached the U.S. Olympic wrestling team at the 1996 Summer Olympics, where American wrestlers won three gold, one silver, and one bronze medal.

== Legacy and honors ==
Seay's contributions were recognized when he was inducted into the National Wrestling Hall of Fame as a Distinguished Member in 1998.

Joe Seay died on July 11, 2019, at the age of 80. His coaching legacy continues to influence the wrestling community.
