= Carlton Haselrig =

American wrestler and football player (1966–2020)

No. 77, 63
- Position: Guard

Personal information
- Born: January 22, 1966; Johnstown, Pennsylvania, U.S.
- Died: July 22, 2020 (aged 54); Johnstown, Pennsylvania, U.S.
- Listed height: 6 ft 1 in (1.85 m)
- Listed weight: 295 lb (134 kg)

Career information
- High school: Johnstown (PA)
- College: Pitt-Johnstown
- NFL draft: 1989: 12th round, 312th overall pick

Career history
- Pittsburgh Steelers (1989–1993); New York Jets (1995); Buffalo Destroyers (1999)

Awards and highlights
- Pro Bowl (1993)

Career NFL statistics
- Games played: 68
- Games started: 47
- Fumble recoveries: 2
- Stats at Pro Football Reference

Carlton Haselrig
- High school: Greater Johnstown (PA)
- State championships: One (Pennsylvania)
- College: Pitt–Johnstown
- NCAA championships: Six (Three NCAA DI, Three NCAA DII)
Medal record
Collegiate Wrestling
Representing Pitt-Johnstown
NCAA Division I Championships
Gold medal – first place	1987 College Park	275 lb
Gold medal – first place	1988 Ames	275 lb
Gold medal – first place	1989 Oklahoma City	275 lb
NCAA Division II Championships
Gold medal – first place	1987 Edwardsville	275 lb
Gold medal – first place	1988 Omaha	275 lb
Gold medal – first place	1989 California	275 lb
Bronze medal – third place	1986 Edwardsville	Unlimited

Carlton Lee Haselrig (January 22, 1966 – July 22, 2020) was an American heavyweight wrestler and National Football League (NFL) player. Haselrig wrestled for University of Pittsburgh at Johnstown. He is the only person to ever win six NCAA titles in wrestling, three times in Division II and three times in Division I. His three-peat of Division II and Division I NCAA National Championships were won in 1987, 1988, and 1989. All six championships were won for Pitt–Johnstown.

Haselrig then moved on to professional football, where he played five seasons in the NFL, becoming a Pro Bowl offensive guard in 1993. In 2008, he made his mixed martial arts debut in Atlantic City, New Jersey. In 2016, Haselrig was inducted into the National Wrestling Hall of Fame as a Distinguished Member.

== Wrestling career ==
Haselrig won the Pennsylvania Interscholastic Athletic Association (PIAA) state high school championship in 1984 despite not wrestling during the regular season due to Johnstown High's lack of a wrestling team. His uncle introduced him to the sport as a child, and he participated in occasional tournaments. He stopped wrestling in high school because his school didn't have a team. But in his junior year, a neighboring high school needed a training partner for a standout wrestler, so Haselrig helped out. After seeing his success against one of the state's top wrestlers, Haselrig's high school petitioned the Pennsylvania Interscholastic Athletic Association to let him compete in wrestling, beginning with the postseason district tournament his senior year. Haselrig went on to win every match, including a PIAA Class AAA state title.

Haselrig was the 1985 Junior Greco-Roman World Champion, and the 1986 Junior Freestyle World Champion, while competing for the United States in the heavyweight division.

The Pennsylvania native began his collegiate career as a football player at Lock Haven, but a knee injury before the start of his freshman year prevented him from playing. During winter break, he decided to transfer to his hometown school and take classes at Pittsburgh-Johnstown, which did not have a football team.

He would finish in third place at the NCAA Division II meet his freshman year in 1986, then go on to win both the Division I and Division II titles in his sophomore, junior and senior seasons, to become the first wrestler in history to win more than four NCAA titles. Before 1990, the Divisions II and III individual champions earned bids to the Division I championships, allowing Haselrig the chance to win both titles. After Haselrig's run of NCAA titles, the Division I Wrestling Committee voted to rescind the bids to the Division II and III champions. As a result, Haselrig's feat cannot be matched unless the rule is changed again.

At Pittsburgh-Johnstown, Haselrig finished his career with a record of 143–2–1, including an, at the time, NCAA-record 122 consecutive matches without a loss. He never lost a match at the NCAA Division I meet, going 15–0 at the heavyweight class in the 1987, 1988 and 1989 tournaments. While in college, Haselrig would also defeat future NCAA and Olympic champion Kurt Angle.

== NFL career ==
After a brief run in wrestling on the international level, Haselrig turned his attention to professional football. Despite never having played football in college, Haselrig was drafted in the 12th round by the Pittsburgh Steelers. He became a Pro Bowl offensive guard in his third NFL season. 1992 was his best season in the NFL, making the 1992 Pro Bowl, while helping the Steelers win the 1992 AFC Central Division title. He also helped the Steelers to three AFC playoff appearances (1989, 1992, 1993). After five seasons with the Steelers, Haselrig spent one season with the New York Jets before retiring from the NFL.

== Mixed martial arts career ==
Haselrig made his professional MMA debut on April 19, 2008, for Battle Cage Xtreme IV in Atlantic City against IFL veteran Shane Ott. He defeated Shane Ott by a technical knockout at 4:09 in the first round. Haselrig defeated Carlos Moreno on May 31, 2008, during the undercard of EliteXC's first-ever CBS telecast. He displayed his superior wrestling skills during the first round keeping Carlos on the mat. Carlos did not return to the ring for the second round. His final record in MMA was 3–2 before retiring.

== Mixed martial arts record ==
Professional record breakdown
5 matches	3 wins	2 losses
By knockout	3	1
By submission	0	1
By decision	0	0
By disqualification	0	0
Unknown	0	0
Draws	0	
No contests	0	

Res.	Record	Opponent	Method	Event	Date	Round	Time	Location	Notes
Loss	3–2	Shawn Jordan	TKO (punches)	UCFC – Rumble on the Rivers	June 27, 2009	1	N/A	Pittsburgh, Pennsylvania, United States	
Win	3–1	Chris Larkin	TKO (punches)	IWFC – Iron Will Fighting Championship 1	May 6, 2009	1	3:18	Johnstown, Pennsylvania, United States	
Loss	2–1	Joe Abouata	Submission (rear naked choke)	BCX 5 – Battle Cage Xtreme 5	July 12, 2008	2	4:10	Atlantic City, New Jersey, United States	
Win	2–0	Carlos Moreno	TKO (strikes)	EliteXC: Primetime	May 31, 2008	1	5:00	Newark, New Jersey, United States	
Win	1–0	Shane Ott	TKO (strikes)	Battle Cage Xtreme 4	April 19, 2008	1	4:09	Atlantic City, New Jersey, United States	

== Death ==
Haselrig died on July 22, 2020, in Johnstown, Pennsylvania from liver disease. He was one of at least 345 NFL players to be diagnosed after death with chronic traumatic encephalopathy (CTE), which is caused by repeated hits to the head.

== Honors ==
Haselrig was honored on January 19, 2016, with "Carlton Haselrig Day" in Johnstown, Pennsylvania.

In 2009, he was inducted into Pitt–Johnstown's Athletics Hall of Fame.

In 2016, Haselrig was inducted into the National Wrestling Hall of Fame as a Distinguished Member.

== See also ==
- List of male mixed martial artists

== Bibliography ==
- Professional MMA record for Carlton Haselrig from Sherdog
- Audio for interview with wrestling411.tv
