= 1940 NCAA wrestling championships =

American collegiate wrestling tournament

1940 NCAA Wrestling Championships
Tournament information
- Sport: College wrestling
- Location: Champaign, Illinois
- Dates: March 29, 1940–March 30, 1940
- Host: University of Illinois
- Venue: Huff Gymnasium

Final positions
- Champions: Oklahoma A&M (11th title)
- 1st runners-up: Indiana
- 2nd runners-up: Michigan
- MVP: Don Nichols (Michigan)

The 1940 NCAA Wrestling Championships were the 13th NCAA Wrestling Championships to be held. The University of Illinois in Champaign, Illinois hosted the tournament at Huff Gymnasium.

Oklahoma A&M took home the team championship with 24 points and having two individual champions.

Don Nichols of Michigan was named the Outstanding Wrestler.

== Team results ==
Rank	School	Points
1	Oklahoma A&M	24
2	Indiana	14
3	Michigan	10
T-4	Ohio State	7
T-4	Lehigh	7
T-4	Colorado State	7
T-7	Minnesota	6
T-7	Iowa State Teachers College	6
T-9	Oklahoma	5
T-9	Iowa Agricultural College	5

== Individual finals ==
Weight class	Championship match (champion in boldface)
121 lbs	**Robert Antonacci**, Indiana DEC Calvin Mehlhorn, Oklahoma A&M
128 lbs	**Harold Byrd**, Oklahoma DEC Dale Hanson, Minnesota
136 lbs	**Al Whitehurst**, Oklahoma A&M DEC Roger Isaacson, Iowa State Teachers College
145 lbs	**Harold Masem**, Lehigh DEC OT William Combs, Michigan
155 lbs	**Vernon Logan**, Oklahoma A&M DEC OT Marvin Farrell, Iowa Agricultural College
165 lbs	**Gene Grenard**, Colorado State WBF Clay Albright, Oklahoma A&M, 7:47
175 lbs	**Don Nichols**, Michigan DEC Garnett Inman, Indiana
UNL	**George Downes**, Ohio State WDF OT George Chiga, Oklahoma A&M
