= 1964 NCAA University Division wrestling championships =

American collegiate wrestling tournament

1964 NCAA University Division Wrestling Championships
Tournament information
- Sport: College wrestling
- Location: Ithaca, New York
- Dates: 3/26/1964–3/28/1964
- Host(s): Cornell

Final positions
- Champions: Oklahoma State
- 2nd place: Oklahoma
- 3rd place: Iowa State
- MVP: Dean Lahr (Colorado)

The 1964 NCAA Wrestling Championships were the 34th NCAA wrestling championships to be held. Cornell hosted the tournament in Ithaca, New York.

Oklahoma State took home the team championship with 87 points having two individual champions.

Dean Lahr of the University of Colorado was named the Most Outstanding Wrestler.

== Team results ==
Rank	School	Points
1	Oklahoma State	87
2	Oklahoma	58
3	Iowa State	46
T-4	Southern Illinois - Carbondale	31
T-4	Colorado	31
6	Michigan	29
7	Lock Haven	23
8	Penn State	19
T-9	Ohio University	18
T-9	Maryland	18

== Individual finals ==
Weight class	Championship match (champion in boldface)
115 lbs	**Terry Finn**, Southern Illinois - Carbondale FALL Roger Seber, Iowa State 10:02 OT
123 lbs	**Fred Powell**, Lock Haven DEC Howie Gangestad, Minnesota State, 13-5
130 lbs	**Yojiro Uetake**, Oklahoma State DEC Jim Hanson, Colorado, 5-2
137 lbs	**Mike Sager**, Oklahoma DEC Gary Wilcox, Michigan, 13-5
147 lbs	**Jerry Stanley**, Oklahoma DEC Mike Reding, Oklahoma State, 1-1, 4-2
157 lbs	**Gordon Hassman**, Iowa State DEC Dick Slutzky, Syracuse, 9-7
167 lbs	**Don Millard**, Southern Illinois - Carbondale DEC Bob Zweiache, Oklahoma State 7-2
177 lbs	**Dean Lahr**, Colorado DEC Bill Harlow, Oklahoma State, 8-4
191 lbs	**Harry Houska**, Ohio University DEC Jack Brisco, Oklahoma State, 6-3
UNL	**Joe James**, Oklahoma State DEC Bob Billberg, Moorhead State (Minnesota), 4-2

== See also ==
- NAIA Men's Wrestling Championship
