= 1938 NCAA wrestling championships =

American collegiate wrestling tournament

1938 NCAA Wrestling Championships
Tournament information
- Sport: College wrestling
- Location: State College, Pennsylvania
- Dates: March 25, 1938–March 26, 1938
- Host(s): Penn State University
- Venue(s): Rec Hall

Final positions
- Champions: Oklahoma A&M (9th title)
- 1st runners-up: Illinois
- 2nd runners-up: Indiana
- MVP: Joe McDaniel (Oklahoma A&M)

The 1938 NCAA Wrestling Championships were the 11th U.S. NCAA Wrestling Championships to be held. Penn State University in State College, Pennsylvania hosted the tournament at Rec Hall.

Oklahoma A&M took home the team championship with 19 points and having three individual champions.

Joe McDaniel of Oklahoma A&M was named the Outstanding Wrestler.

== Team results ==
Rank	School	Points
1	Oklahoma A&M	19
2	Illinois	15
3	Indiana	12
T-4	Southwestern Oklahoma State	8
T-4	Oklahoma	8
6	Minnesota	6
T-7	Harvard	5
T-7	Lehigh	5
T-7	Cornell College	5
10	Chicago	4

== Individual finals ==
Weight class	Championship match (champion in boldface)
118 lbs	**Joe McDaniel**, Oklahoma A&M DEC Willard Duffy, Indiana
126 lbs	**Allen Sapora**, Illinois DEC Robert Murray, Cornell College
135 lbs	**David Matthews**, Oklahoma WDF Archie Deutschman, Illinois
145 lbs	**Stanley Henson**, Oklahoma A&M DEC Robert Finwall, Chicago
155 lbs	**Dale Scrivens**, Oklahoma A&M DEC OT Ken Knight, Southwestern Oklahoma State
165 lbs	**John Ginay**, Illinois DEC Curt Ford, Lehigh
175 lbs	**John Harkness**, Harvard DEC Swede Olsen, Southwestern Oklahoma State
UNL	**Charles McDaniel**, Indiana DEC Clifton Gustafson, Minnesota
