= 1929 NCAA Wrestling Championships =

American collegiate wrestling tournament

Tournament information
- Sport: College wrestling
- Location: Columbus, Ohio
- Dates: March 29, 1929–March 30, 1929
- Host(s): Ohio State University
- Venue(s): Ohio Expo Center Coliseum

Final positions
- Champions: Oklahoma A&M (2nd title)
- 1st runners-up: Michigan
- 2nd runners-up: Oklahoma

The 1929 NCAA Wrestling Championships were the 2nd NCAA Wrestling Championships to be held. Ohio State University in Columbus, Ohio hosted the tournament at the Ohio Expo Center Coliseum.

Oklahoma A&M took home the team championship with 26 points with four individual champions.

== Team results ==
Rank	School	Points
1	Oklahoma A&M	26
2	Michigan	18
3	Oklahoma	13
4	Illinois	11
5	Wisconsin	9
6	Cornell	7
7	Purdue	4
8	Ohio State	3
T-9	West Virginia	2
T-9	Iowa	2

== Individual finals ==
Weight class	Championship match (champion in boldface)
115 lbs	**Joe Sapora**, Illinois TA Marvin Leach, Oklahoma, 5:57
125 lbs	**Laurance Mantooth**, Oklahoma TA Robert Hewitt, Michigan, 3:59
135 lbs	**George Minot**, Illinois TA Leo Miller, Oklahoma, 6:48
145 lbs	**George Bancroft**, Oklahoma A&M TA Otto Kelly, Michigan, 3:03
155 lbs	**Jack Van Bebber**, Oklahoma A&M TA Ray Parker, Michigan, 4:34
165 lbs	**Conrad Caldwell**, Oklahoma A&M TA OT Ben Hooker, Purdue, 1:32
175 lbs	**Glenn Stafford**, Cornell TA Carl Dougovito, Michigan, 4:08
UNL	**Earl McCready**, Oklahoma A&M WBF Selmer Swenson, Wisconsin, 1:25
