= 1928 NCAA Wrestling Championships =

American collegiate wrestling tournament

Tournament information
- Sport: College wrestling
- Location: Ames, Iowa
- Host(s): Iowa Agricultural College
- Venue(s): State Gymnasium
- Participants: 21

Final positions
- Champions: Unofficial; Oklahoma A&M (1st title)

The 1928 NCAA Wrestling Championships were contested at the first annual NCAA-sponsored wrestling meet to determine the individual national champions of collegiate wrestling in the United States. The inaugural edition was hosted by the Iowa Agricultural College (now known as Iowa State) at State Gymnasium in Ames, Iowa.

Unlike later editions in 1929 and 1930, and every NCAA Wrestling Championship event since 1934, no team championship was awarded. A total of seven individual championships were awarded across seven corresponding weight classes. Oklahoma A&M, nonetheless, won four of the seven weight classes and have been subsequently deemed the 1928 unofficial national team champions.

== Results ==
| Weight class | Champion | Team |
|---|---|---|
| 115 | Harold DeMarsh | Oklahoma A&M |
| 125 | Ralph Lupton | Northwestern |
| 135 | Arthur Holding | Iowa Agricultural |
| 145 | Melvin Clodfelter | Oklahoma A&M |
| 158 | Leslie Beers | Iowa |
| 175 | George Rule | Oklahoma A&M |
| Heavyweight | Earl McCready | Oklahoma A&M |

== See also ==
- Pre-NCAA Wrestling Champion
