= Myron Roderick =

American wrestler and coach (1934–2011)

Biographical details
- Born: September 15, 1934; Anthony, Kansas, US
- Died: December 28, 2011 (aged 77); Stillwater, Oklahoma, US
- Education: Oklahoma A&M

Playing career

Wrestling
- 1953–1956: Oklahoma A&M

Coaching career (HC unless noted)

Wrestling
- 1957–1969: Oklahoma State

Tennis
- 1958–1967: Oklahoma State

Administrative career (AD unless noted)
- 1983–1990: Oklahoma State

Head coaching record
- Overall: 140-10-7 (Wrestling)

Accomplishments and honors

Championships
- 7 NCAA Wrestling Championships (1958, 1959, 1961, 1962, 1964, 1966, 1968)

Awards
- National Wrestling Hall of Fame Distinguished Member (1976)

Medal record

Collegiate Wrestling

Representing Oklahoma A&M

NCAA Championships
Gold medal – first place	1955 Ithaca	130 lb
Gold medal – first place	1956 Stillwater	130 lb
Bronze medal – third place	1954 Norman	137 lb

Myron Willis Roderick (September 15, 1934 – December 28, 2011) was an American wrestler, college coach, and college athletics administrator. As a wrestler in college, he was a three-time All-American and three-time NCAA Wrestling national champion. He competed at the 1956 Summer Olympics in freestyle wrestling. As a wrestling coach at Oklahoma State, Roderick introduced recruiting on a major scale in the sport of wrestling. Oklahoma State would win seven team NCAA Championships while he was head coach. Roderick also established the foundation of what is now USA Wrestling.

In 1976, Roderick was inducted into the inaugural class of the National Wrestling Hall of Fame as a Distinguished Member.
