= Chris Pendleton =

American wrestler (born 1982)

Personal information
- Born: January 21, 1982 (age 44) Lemoore, California, U.S.

Sport
- Country: United States
- Sport: Wrestling
- Events: Freestyle and Folkstyle
- College team: Oklahoma State
- Coached by: John Smith
Medal record
Men's collegiate wrestling
Representing the Oklahoma State Cowboys
NCAA Division I Championships
Gold medal – first place	2004 St. Louis	174 lb
Gold medal – first place	2005 St. Louis	174 lb
Bronze medal – third place	2003 Kansas City	174 lb
Big 12 Championships
Gold medal – first place	2003 Columbia	174 lb
Gold medal – first place	2005 Omaha	174 lb
Silver medal – second place	2004 Ames	174 lb

Chris Pendleton (born January 21, 1982) is a former American wrestler who competed collegiately for Oklahoma State University. Pendleton won NCAA Division I wrestling titles at 174 pounds in 2004 and 2005 and was a three-time All-American.

== Career ==
Pendleton won the 145-pound CIF state championship his senior year at Lemoore High School in Lemoore, California after placing 4th as a junior. His senior year performance in 2000 earned him the Junior Schalles Award as the top high school pinner.

In college, he defeated future two-time NCAA champion, Dan Hodge Trophy winner, and MMA world champion Ben Askren of Missouri for both of his NCAA titles. Pendleton had beaten Askren in the majority of their meetings and provoked controversy after telling a reporter that there was no "rivalry" between them. He is the son of Bill Pendleton of Fresno and Lisa Cervantez of Lemoore. He has two younger brothers who both were wrestlers as well.

In March 2020, he was named head wrestling coach at Oregon State University.
