= 1931 NCAA Wrestling Championships =

American collegiate wrestling tournament

Tournament information
- Sport: College wrestling
- Location: Providence, Rhode Island
- Dates: March 27, 1931–March 28, 1931
- Host(s): Brown University
- Venue(s): Brown Gymnasium

Final positions
- Champions: Unofficial; Oklahoma A&M (4th title)
- 1st runners-up: Iowa Agricultural College
- 2nd runners-up: Kansas State

The 1931 NCAA Wrestling Championships were the 4th NCAA Wrestling Championships to be held. Brown University in Providence, Rhode Island hosted the tournament at Brown Gymnasium.

Oklahoma A&M took home the team championship with 29 points with four individual champions.

== Team results ==
Rank	School	Points
1	Oklahoma A&M	29
2	Iowa Agricultural College	17
3	Kansas State	13
4	Iowa State Teachers College	8
5	Lehigh	7
T-6	Northwestern	5
T-6	Michigan State	5
T-6	Michigan	5
9	Cornell College	5

== Individual finals ==
Weight class	Championship match (champion in boldface)
115 lbs	**John Engel**, Lehigh WBF Jesse Arends, Iowa State Teachers College, 9:00
125 lbs	**Bobby Pearce**, Oklahoma A&M TA Lyle Morford, Cornell College, 2:04
135 lbs	**Richard Cole**, Iowa Agricultural College TA John Devine, Oklahoma A&M, 1:53
145 lbs	**Bill Doyle**, Kansas State TA Walter Thomas, Iowa Agricultural College, 1:48
155 lbs	**LeRoy McGuirk**, Oklahoma A&M TA John Richardson, Kansas State, 3:35
165 lbs	**Jack Van Bebber**, Oklahoma A&M WBF Robert Hess, Iowa Agricultural College, 4:25
175 lbs	**Conrad Caldwell**, Oklahoma A&M TA Carl Dougovito, Michigan, 3:52
UNL	**Jack Riley**, Northwestern WBF Harry Fields, Haverford, 4:30
