= 1935 NCAA Wrestling Championships =

American collegiate wrestling tournament

Tournament information
- Sport: College wrestling
- Location: Bethlehem, Pennsylvania
- Dates: March 1935–March 1935
- Host(s): Lehigh
- Venue(s): Taylor Gymnasium

Final positions
- Champions: Oklahoma A&M (7th title)
- Runner-up: Oklahoma

The 1935 NCAA Wrestling Championships were the 8th NCAA Wrestling Championships to be held. Lehigh in Bethlehem, Pennsylvania hosted the tournament at Taylor Gymnasium.

Oklahoma A&M took home the team championship with 36 points and three individual champions.

Ross Flood of Oklahoma A&M was named the Outstanding Wrestler.

== Team results ==
Rank	School	Points
1	Oklahoma A&M	36
2	Oklahoma	18
T-3	Indiana	15
T-3	Illinois	15
T-5	Lehigh	8
T-5	Penn State	8
T-7	Southwestern Oklahoma	6
T-7	Iowa	6
T-7	Cornell College	6
T-10	Washington & Lee	5

== Individual finals ==
Weight class	Championship match (champion in boldface)
118 lbs	**Rex Peery**, Oklahoma A&M WBF Willard Duffy, Indiana, 5:52
126 lbs	**Ross Flood**, Oklahoma A&M WBF Jock Gott, Southwestern Oklahoma, 6:53
135 lbs	**Vernon Sisney**, Oklahoma TA Ralph Rasor, Oklahoma A&M, 1:32
145 lbs	**Wayne Martin**, Oklahoma TA Louis Tomlinson, Central Oklahoma, 5:36
155 lbs	**Frank Lewis**, Oklahoma A&M WBF Howard McGrath, Cornell College, 4:22
165 lbs	**Howard Johnston**, Penn State TA Earl Kielhorn, Iowa, 5:13
175 lbs	**Ralph Silverstein**, Illinois TA Lloyd Ricks, Oklahoma A&M, 3:14
UNL	**Charles McDaniel**, Indiana TA Howell Scobey, Lehigh, 3:28
