= Pittsburgh Panthers wrestling =

Sports team at the University of Pittsburgh

- University: University of Pittsburgh
- Head coach: Keith Gavin (8th season)
- Conference: ACC
- Location: Pittsburgh, PA
- Arena: Fitzgerald Field House (capacity: 4,122)
- Nickname: Panthers
- Colors: Blue and gold

NCAA individual champions
- 17

All-Americans
- 83^{*}

Conference championships
- 2010, 2011, 2012, 2014, 2023

Conference Tournament championships
- 1954, 1955, 1956, 1960, 2011, 2012, 2013
- Website: pittsburghpanthers.com/sports/wrestling

Pittsburgh Panthers wrestling is the NCAA Division I intercollegiate wrestling program of the University of Pittsburgh, often referred to as "Pitt", located in Pittsburgh, Pennsylvania. The Pitt wrestling team competes in the Atlantic Coast Conference (ACC) and hosts home meets at Fitzgerald Field House on the campus of the school. Since the Pitt wrestling program began in the 1912–1913 school year, it has produced 17 individual national champions and 83^{*} All-American selections. The head coach of the Panthers since 2017 is Keith Gavin, who won a national championship with the Panthers in 2008.

== History ==
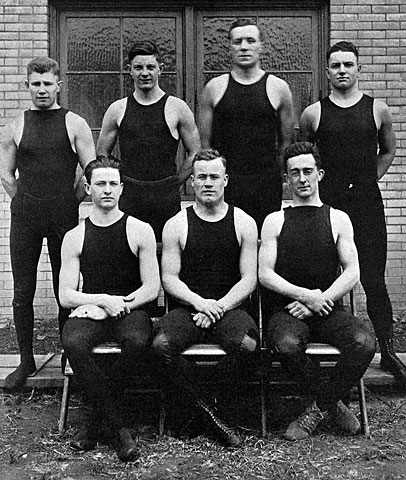
The 1914–1915 Pitt wrestling team included All-American football star and future legendary Pitt head football coach Jock Sutherland (top row, second from right)

Wrestling at Pitt began in the 1912–1913 school year and eventually became one of the most tradition-rich sports at the university. Pitt's wrestling program boasts 17 individual NCAA national champions, the 15th most among all schools, and 83^{*} All-Americans throughout the program's history. Pitt's all-time dual meet record, through the 2022–23 season, is 593-433-18 (0.577).

The school's most prominent years were the during the era the program was directed by head coach Rex Peery. During this stretch from 1952 until 1963, the team never finished lower than 9th at the NCAA Championship, placing second both in 1954 and when hosting the NCAA Championship at Fitzgerald Field House in 1957. Peery coached 13 individual national champions and twice during this span, in 1956 and 1957, the Panthers boasted five All-Americans in one season. Pitt also won the Eastern Intercollegiate Wrestling Association tournament in 1954, 1955, 1956, and 1960.

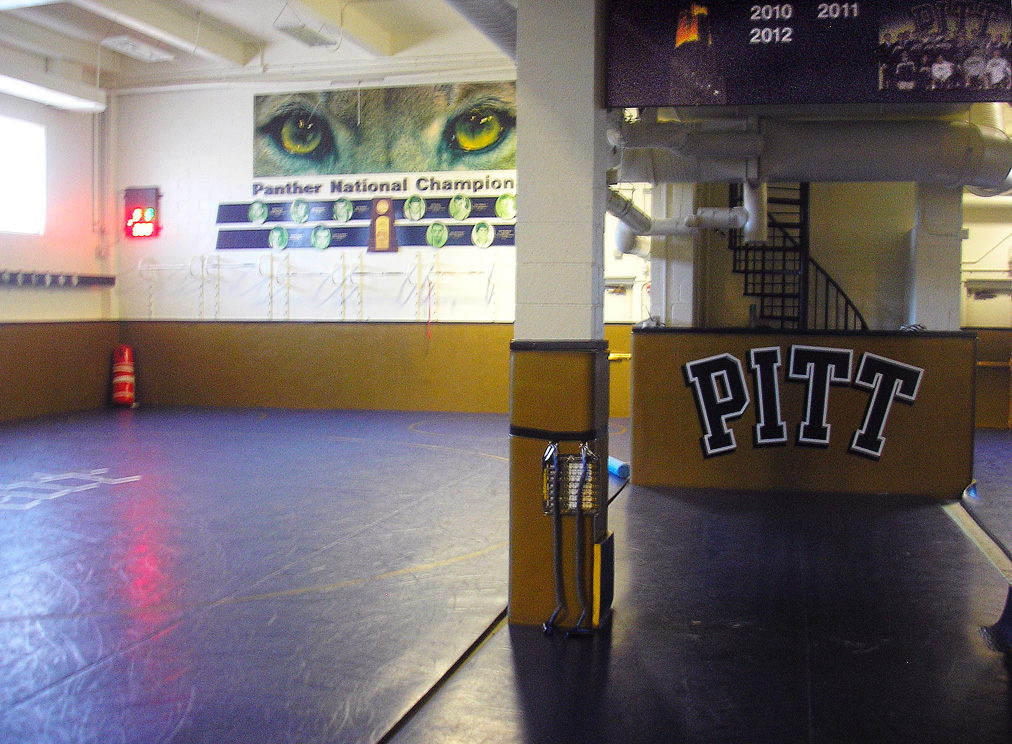
The wrestling room in Fitzgerald Field House

Between 1979 and 2013, Pitt's wrestling team was under the leadership of head coach Rande Stottlemyer, a three time All-American wrestler for Pitt in 1974, 1975, and 1978 and a five-time Coach of the Year (1986–87, 1989–90, 2007–08, 2009–10, 2011–12) in the Eastern Wrestling League, the wrestling conference Pitt competed in between 1976 and 2013. Under his direction, Pitt produced 56 EWL individual EWL champions, 33 All-Americans, and 3 individual National Champions including Pat Santoro, a back-to-back champion at 142 lbs, and the 2008 champion at 174 lbs, Keith Gavin. In 2010, Stottlemyer guided Pitt to a school record 17 dual meet wins and an overall 17-1-1 record en route to the team capturing the Panthers' first-ever EWL dual-meet championship. In 2011 and 2012, Pitt repeated as dual meet champions with 6-0 EWL records in each season. Pitt went on to win its first EWL tournament team title in 2011 and repeated as EWL tournament champions in 2012 and 2013, Pitt's final year in the conference and Stottlemyer's final season as head coach. Following the 2012–13 season, Stottlemyer retired after 34 years as Pitt's all-time winningest wrestling coach with a record of 304-230-12.

Pitt moved into the Atlantic Coast Conference in 2013–14 season with Jason Peters, an assistant under Stottlemyer for ten seasons, taking over as head coach until 2017. In its first year of ACC competition, the wrestling team swept through its conference dual meet schedule with a perfect 6–0 record to capture the university's first regular season ACC title in any sport. Pitt tied for the ACC dual meet championship in 2023. Keith Gavin, a former national champion at 174 lbs during his time at Pitt, is the current head coach.

== NCAA Championship results ==
Pitt wrestling has scored points in 68 NCAA Division I Championships over the years, finishing as high as second place twice and in the top ten 13 times.

Pitt wrestling's NCAA Division I Championship results

Year	Finish	AAs	NCs
1952	9th-t	1	1
1953	6th	3	1
1954	2nd	3	2
1955	3rd	3	1
1956	3rd	5	2
1957	2nd	5	3
1958	9th	1	1
1959	5th	3
1960	8th	1
1961	5th	2	1
1962	6th-t	3
1963	4th-t	4	1
1964	27th-t
1965	45th-t
1966	45th-t
1968	52nd-t
1969	28th	1
1970	8th	2

Year	Finish	AAs	NCs
1971	35th-t
1972	66th
1973	48th-t
1974	18th	2
1975	30th-t	1
1976	37th-t
1977	43rd-t
1978	20th	1
1979	55th-t
1982	44th-t
1983	55th-t
1984	25th-t	1
1985	64th-t
1986	25th	2
1987	15th	1
1988	15th	1	1
1989	13th	1	1
1990	44th

Year	Finish	AAs	NCs
1991	27th	2
1992	19th-t	1
1993	30th-t	1
1994	24th-t	1
1995	26th	2
1996	24th	2
1997	18th	2
1998	20th	3
1999	37th-t
2000	18th	2
2001	25th-t
2002	45th-t
2003	19th-t	1
2004	38th-t
2005	29th	1
2006	35th
2007	20th	2
2008	16th	1	1

Year	Finish	AAs	NCs
2009	38th	1
2010	26th	1
2011	34th
2012	15th	2
2013	15th-t	2
2014	22nd	1
2015	21st	1
2016	39th-t
2017	32nd-t
2018	31st-t
2019	34th-t
2020*	*	2*	*
2021	11th	2
2022	24th	1
2023	22nd	1	1
2024	26th-t
2025	27th-t	1
2026	26th

AAs=All-Americans; NCs=Individual National Champions. t=team tied for place in final standings. Refs:

* In 2020, the COVID-19 pandemic ended the wrestling season early and the NCAA Division I Wrestling Championships were cancelled. In the final released 2020 Division 1 team ranking of the National Wrestling Coaches Association (NWCA), Pitt was ranked 8th in the nation, while InterMat's final team rankings placed Pitt 16th in its Tournament rankings and 10th in its Dual Meet rankings. Since 1979, All-American selections are awarded to individuals who finish among the top eight wrestlers in each weight class at the NCAA championship. In lieu of NCAA championship results, the NWCA used wrestler's overall body of work through the cancellation of the season to name All-Americans for the 2020 season. Pitt's Micky Phillipi (133 lbs) and Demetrius Thomas (heavyweight) were named as first team All-Americans, while Jake Wentzel (165 lbs) and Nino Bonaccorsi (184 lbs) were named as Second Team All-Americans. Only the first-team NWCA selections for 2020, which were listed as the top eight wrestlers in each weight class, are counted for the purposes of Pitt's total All-American selections in this article.

== Individual national champions ==
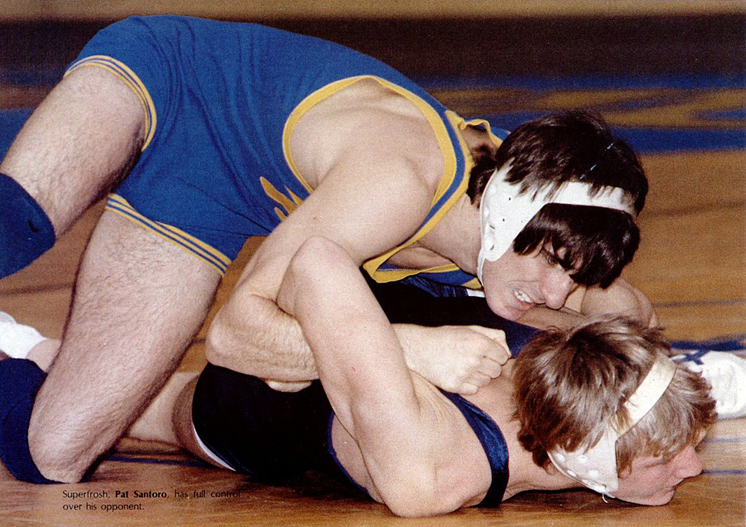
Pat Santoro was a four-time All-American and two-time national champion at 142 pounds

Pitt wrestlers have won individual NCAA national championships 17 different times in various weight classes. All-time, Pitt has the 15th most individual NCAA champion wrestlers among all Division I schools.

- Hugh Peery, 115 lbs (1952, 1953, 1954)
- Joe Solomon, 167 lbs (1954)
- Ed Peery, 123 lbs (1955, 1956, 1957)
- Ed DeWitt, 167 lbs (1956)
- Tom Alberts, 167 lbs (1957)
- Ron Schirf, 191 lbs (1957)
- Paul Powell, 123 lbs (1958)
- Larry Lauchle, 130 lbs (1961)
- Jim Harrison, 167 lbs (1963)
- Pat Santoro, 142 lbs (1988, 1989)
- Keith Gavin, 174 lbs (2008)
- Nino Bonaccorsi, 197 lbs (2023)

== Hall of Fame ==
Pitt has three individuals inducted as Distinguished Members of the National Wrestling Hall of Fame as a wrestler or a coach.

- Rex Peery, coach, inducted 1976
- Ed Peery, wrestler, inducted 1980
- Hugh Peery, wrestler, inducted 1980
