= Conrad Davis Mock =

American wrestling coach (born 1958)

C.D. Mock
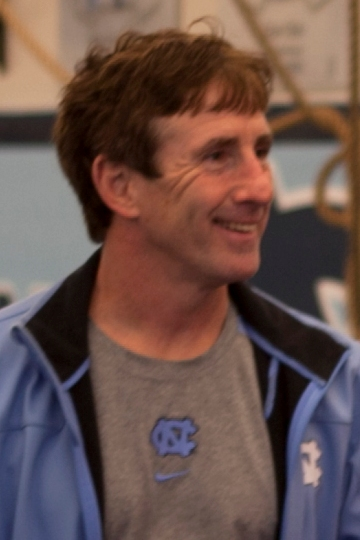
- C.D. Mock in 2013

Personal information
- Full name: Conrad Davis Mock
- Born: 1958 (age 67–68) Saint Petersburg, Florida, U.S.
- Home town: Newtown, Pennsylvania, U.S.
Medal record
Collegiate Wrestling
Representing the North Carolina Tar Heels
NCAA Division I Championships
Gold medal – first place	1982 Ames	134 lb
Bronze medal – third place	1979 Ames	126 lb
ACC Championships
Gold medal – first place	1978 Raleigh	126 lb
Gold medal – first place	1979 Clemson	126 lb
Gold medal – first place	1982 Chapel Hill	134 lb

C.D. Mock (born 1958) is a former University of North Carolina at Chapel Hill (UNC) wrestling head coach. He held this position from 2003 to 2015. His UNC team saw success in the 2005 - 2006 season. He is a UNC alumnus and amateur wrestler.

== Personal life and education ==
Mock was born in 1958 in Saint Petersburg, Florida. He grew up in Newtown Township, Pennsylvania attending Council Rock High School. He then enrolled at UNC, graduating in 1982. After graduation, Mock returned to Newton. In 1985, Mock founded Equity Consultants inc., a stock brokerage firm which was registered until 2000. In 1984, Mock married Mickie Robinson, a physician assistant who was a UNC graduate and a member of the UNC gymnastics team. They have two children.

== Career ==
=== High school ===
Mock wrestled for four seasons while attending Council Rock High School in Newtown. Mock began wrestling in his freshman year. In his senior year, Mock won a PIAA class AAA state title. Mock's start in wrestling was at a later age than the usual 6 years. He dedicated his spare time to training.

=== College ===
In 1982, while enrolled University of North Carolina at Chapel Hill (UNC), Mock became the first National Collegiate Athletic Association (NCAA) wrestling champion from his school. He finished with a score of 35-0 in the 134 lb weight class. Mock also won titles at three Atlantic Coast Conference (ACC) championships where he achieved a score of 64-4. His winning percentage was third highest in the history of collegiate wrestling in North Carolina. Mock was named an All-American in the NCAA competition on two occasions. Mock was awarded the Patterson medal, an annual UNC honour for achievement in sport.

=== Coaching ===
After graduation from UNC, Mock became a wrestling coach at Council Rock high school. He became the head coach of wrestling at the UNC in 2003. In 2005, the UNC college team, the Tar Heels won ACC titles and a 16-8-1 dual meet record in 2006. Mock's wrestlers in individual competition included Evan Sola who placed sixth in the ACC competition in 2005 and Evan Henderson who gained an ACC fourth place in 2014.

== Controversy ==
In 2015, after speaking out about the application of the Title IX federal law with respect to his son at the University of Tennessee, Mock's employment at the University of North Carolina was terminated. On 7 September 2015, Mock published a personal statement on the website of The James G. Martin Center for Academic Renewal, a higher education lobby group. He wrote that in June 2014, his son was accused of sexual assault and that the matter was dismissed when a judge opined that the burden of proof of non-consent had not been met by the accuser. Mock wrote, "my stance that the increasing reliance on campus committees and administrators applying affirmative consent standards instead of following due legal process must have rankled ... key UNC people". A lack of effectiveness of Mock's coaching was also raised as a reason for his dismissal.
