= Greg Gibson (wrestler) =

American wrestler (born 1953)

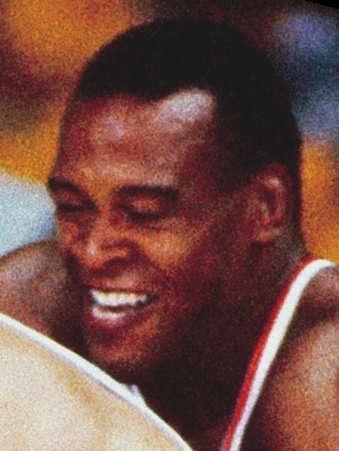
- Gibson at the 1984 Olympics

Personal information
- Born: November 20, 1953 (age 72) Redding, California, U.S.
- Height: 1.90 m (6 ft 3 in)
- Weight: 100 kg (220 lb)

Sport
- Country: United States
- Sport: Wrestling
- Events: Greco-Roman, Freestyle, Sambo, and Folkstyle
- College team: Oregon
- Club: U.S. Marine Corps
- Team: USA
- Coached by: Ronald Finley
Medal record
Men's Greco-Roman wrestling
Representing the United States
Olympic Games
Silver medal – second place	1984 Los Angeles	100 kg
Military World Games
Gold medal – first place	1985 Philadelphia	100 kg
World Military Championships
Gold medal – first place	1983 Villeurbanne	100 kg
Men's freestyle wrestling
Representing the United States
World Championships
Silver medal – second place	1981 Skopje	100 kg
Silver medal – second place	1983 Kiev	100 kg
Bronze medal – third place	1982 Edmonton	100 kg
Military World Games
Gold medal – first place	1985 Philadelphia	100 kg
World Military Championships
Gold medal – first place	1983 Villeurbanne	100 kg
Pan American Games
Gold medal – first place	1983 Caracas	100 kg
Men's sambo
Representing the United States
World Championships
Gold medal – first place	1982 Paris	100 kg
Men's collegiate wrestling
Representing the Oregon Ducks
NCAA Division I Championships
Silver medal – second place	1975 Princeton	Heavyweight
Silver medal – second place	1976 Tucson	Heavyweight

Gregory P. Gibson (born November 20, 1953) is an American former wrestler who competed in the 100 kg weight division. He is the only American to win World medals in three styles of wrestling — Freestyle, Greco-Roman and Sambo.

While serving with the U.S. Marines, stationed at Quantico, Virginia, he won a silver medal at the 1984 Summer Olympics in Greco-Roman, as well as two silver and a bronze medal in freestyle wrestling at the World Championships from 1981 to 1983.

== Background ==
Gibson graduated from Shasta High School in Redding, California in 1972. He wrestled at Shasta College earning All-American honors and the University of Oregon where he became a two-time NCAA All-American. Gibson joined the United States Marine Corps in 1978 and retired as a master sergeant in 2003.

In 2007, Gibson was inducted into the National Wrestling Hall of Fame as a Distinguished Member.
