= Peter Mehringer =

American wrestler (1910–1987)

Personal information
- Born: July 15, 1910 Jetmore, Kansas, U.S.
- Died: August 27, 1987 (aged 77) Pullman, Washington, U.S.
- Home town: Kinsley, Kansas, U.S.
Medal record
Men's freestyle wrestling
Representing the United States
Olympic Games
Gold medal – first place	1932 Los Angeles	87 kg
Collegiate Wrestling
Representing the Kansas Jayhawks
NCAA Championships
Silver medal – second place	1932 Bloomington	Heavyweight

Peter Joseph Mehringer (July 15, 1910 – August 27, 1987) was an American Olympic gold medal-winning freestyle wrestler from Kinsley, Kansas. Mehringer was nicknamed the "Kansas Whirlwind".

After learning how to wrestle from a correspondence course, he went on to win two Kansas high school state championships, and then three Missouri Valley Conference titles while attending the University of Kansas. He was an All-American and national runner-up at the 1932 NCAA championships. The KU sophomore won a gold medal at the 1932 Olympic Games, becoming the first KU athlete to ever have won an Olympic gold medal. Mehringer returned to KU in 1932 for his junior season and solidified his place among KU's all-time great athletes by earning All-Big Six Conference honors in football as a 214-pound tackle. Financial considerations prevented him from graduating from KU.

Mehringer went on to play professional football with the Chicago Cardinals and the Los Angeles Bulldogs, and worked occasionally as a movie extra and stunt man. He is also KU's only grappling icon to have pursue a career in professional wrestling, mostly doing tours in New Zealand.

He was inducted into the National Wrestling Hall of Fame as a Distinguished Member in 1983 and the Kansas Wrestling Coaches Association Hall of Fame in 1984.
