= Bradley M. Glass =

American politician (1931–2015)

Brad Glass

Member of the Illinois Senate from the 1st district
- In office 1973 – 1979
- Preceded by: W. Russell Arrington
- Succeeded by: Roger Keats

Personal details
- Born: January 17, 1931 Evanston, Illinois
- Died: August 6, 2015 (aged 84) Dodgeville, Wisconsin
- Party: Republican
- Spouse: Barbara (m. 1953)
- Education: Princeton University (B.A.); University of Michigan (J.D.)
- Profession: Attorney

Military service
- Allegiance: United States
- Branch/service: United States Navy
- Rank: Lieutenant

Medal record

Collegiate Wrestling

Representing the Princeton Tigers

NCAA Championships
Gold medal – first place	1951 Bethlehem	Heavyweight
Bronze medal – third place	1952 Fort Collins	191 lb

Bradley McConnell Glass (January 17, 1931 – August 6, 2015) was an American politician in the state of Illinois. He served in the Illinois Senate from 1973 to 1979.

== Early life ==
Bradley McConnell Glass was born on January 17, 1931, in Evanston, Illinois. Glass was a member of the 1950 College Football All-America Team while at Princeton. He was also on the Princeton wrestling team, winning an NCAA heavyweight title in 1951. He is a member of the Eastern Intercollegiate Wrestling Association Hall of Fame. A lawyer, he was an alumnus of Princeton University in 1953 and University of Michigan Law School. After graduating from Princeton, Glass enlisted in the United States Navy and graduated from Officer Candidate School. Glass retired with the rank of Lieutenant. He also served on village and school boards. Bradley served as village attorney for Palatine, Illinois and Northfield, Illinois. During this time, Glass was involved with the Regular Republican Organization in Northfield Township as a precinct captain, area director, and executive board member.

== Political career ==
In 1968, Glass was an unsuccessful candidate for the Cook County Circuit Court. In 1970, Glass was elected to the Illinois House of Representatives. After W. Russell Arrington announced his retirement, Glass announced his intention to succeed Arrington. In the 1972 general election, Glass defeated Democratic candidate and political science professor Ann Matasar to succeed Arrington in the 1st district. In the 1978 Republican primary, Glass ran for the Republican nomination for Illinois Treasurer. James M. Skelton, the county treasurer for Champaign County, defeated Glass in the primary with 52% of the vote. Glass was succeeded by fellow Republican Roger A. Keats in the Illinois Senate.

== Post-political career ==
In 1987, Glass and his wife moved to Dodgeville, Wisconsin where he practiced law and was the Dodgeville village attorney. While a Wisconsin resident, Glass served as a member of the Lower Wisconsin State Riverway Board and the Southwestern Wisconsin Regional Planning Commission. He died in Dodgeville, Wisconsin on August 6, 2015, after a long struggle with Alzheimer's disease.
