= 1976 NCAA Division I Wrestling Championships =

American collegiate wrestling tournament

Tournament information
- Sport: College wrestling
- Location: Tucson, Arizona
- Dates: March 11, 1976–March 13, 1976
- Host(s): University of Arizona
- Venue(s): McKale Center

Final positions
- Champions: Iowa (2nd title)
- 1st runners-up: Iowa State
- 2nd runners-up: Oklahoma State

Tournament statistics
- Attendance: 17,297
- MVP: Chuck Yagla (Iowa)

The 1976 NCAA Division I Wrestling Championships were the 46th NCAA Division I Wrestling Championships to be held. The University of Arizona in Tucson, Arizona hosted the tournament at the McKale Center.

Iowa took home the team championship with 123.25 points and three individual champions.

Chuck Yagla of Iowa was named the Most Outstanding Wrestler and Herb Calvert of Oklahoma received the Gorriaran Award.

== Team results ==
Rank	School	Points
1	Iowa	123.25
2	Iowa State	85.75
3	Oklahoma State	64.5
4	Wisconsin	64
5	Lehigh	55.25
6	Cal Poly	53
7	Minnesota	42.5
8	Michigan	36.5
9	Oklahoma	34.25
10	Penn State	23.25

== Individual finals ==
Weight class	Championship match (champion in boldface)
118 lbs	**Mark DiGiroiamo**, Cal Poly-SLO MAJOR Johnnie Jones, Iowa State, 14–4
126 lbs	**Jack Reinwand**, Wisconsin DEC Harold Wiley, California-Santa Barbara, 9–6
134 lbs	**Mike Frick**, Lehigh DEC Pat Milkovich, Michigan State, 7–4
142 lbs	**Brad Smith**, Iowa MAJOR Gene Costello, Slippery Rock, 12–4
150 lbs	**Chuck Yagla**, Iowa DEC Pete Galea, Iowa State, 5–0
158 lbs	**Lee Kemp**, Wisconsin DEC Tom Brown, Washington, 4–0
167 lbs	**Pat Christenson**, Wisconsin DEC Dan Wagermann, Iowa, 9–7
177 lbs	**Chris Campbell**, Iowa DEC Mark Johnson, Michigan, 9–4
190 lbs	**Evan Johnson**, Minnesota DEC Frank Santana, Iowa State, 6–6, 2–0
UNL	**Jimmy Jackson**, Oklahoma State DEC Greg Gibson, Oregon, 5–3
