= 1951 NCAA wrestling championships =

American collegiate wrestling tournament

1951 NCAA Wrestling Championships
Tournament information
- Sport: College wrestling
- Location: Bethlehem, Pennsylvania
- Dates: March 1951–March 1951
- Host(s): Lehigh
- Venue(s): Taylor Gymnasium

Final positions
- Champions: Oklahoma (2nd title)
- 1st runners-up: Oklahoma A&M
- 2nd runners-up: Penn State
- MVP: Walter Romanowski (Cornell College)

The 1951 NCAA Wrestling Championships were the 21st NCAA Wrestling Championships to be held. Lehigh in Bethlehem, Pennsylvania hosted the tournament at Taylor Gymnasium.

Oklahoma took home the team championship with 21 points and having one individual champion.

Walter Romanowski of Cornell College was named the Most Outstanding Wrestler.

== Team results ==
Rank	School	Points
1	Oklahoma	24
2	Oklahoma A&M	23
3	Penn State	15
4	Iowa State Teachers College	10
5	Princeton	8
T-6	Toledo	7
T-6	Ohio State	7
T-6	Michigan State	7
T-9	Waynesburg	6
T-9	Cornell College	6

== Individual finals ==
Weight class	Championship match (champion in boldface)
123 lbs	**Tony Gizoni**, Waynesburg DEC Bill Borders, Oklahoma, 7–6
130 lbs	**Walter Romanowski**, Cornell College DEC Hal Moore, Oklahoma A&M, 5–4
137 lbs	**George Layman**, Oklahoma A&M DEC Tommy Evans, Oklahoma, 7–4
147 lbs	**Keith Young**, Iowa State Teachers College DEC Don Frey, Penn State, 5–3
157 lbs	**Phil Smith**, Oklahoma MAJOR Fred McLean, Ohio State, 10–2
167 lbs	**Gene Gibbons**, Michigan State WBF George Graveson, Yale, 7:10
177 lbs	**Grover Rains**, Oklahoma A&M DEC Mike Rubino, Penn State, 3–2
UNL	**Brad Glass**, Princeton URD Homer Barr, Penn State, 2–2
