= Mark Churella =

American wrestler

Personal information
- Born: 1957 (age 68–69) Farmington, Michigan, U.S.

Sport
- Country: United States
- Sport: Wrestling
- Events: Freestyle and Folkstyle
- College team: Michigan
- Team: USA
Medal record
Men's freestyle wrestling
Representing the United States
Junior World Championships
Gold medal – first place	1977 Las Vegas	74 kg
Collegiate Wrestling
Representing the Michigan Wolverines
NCAA Division I Championships
Gold medal – first place	1977 Norman	150 lb
Gold medal – first place	1978 College Park	150 lb
Gold medal – first place	1979 Ames	167 lb

Mark Churella, Sr. (born c. 1957) is a former American wrestler and collegiate wrestling coach. He was a three-time NCAA national champion from 1977 to 1979. He served as the head wrestling coach at UNLV from 1979 to 1984. He has been inducted into the University of Michigan Athletic Hall of Honor (1996) and the National Wrestling Hall of Fame (1999) and was the 2012 recipient of the Bob Ufer Award for outstanding service to the University of Michigan Athletic Department.

== Early years ==
Churella was raised in Farmington, Michigan. As a student at Farmington High School, he was selected as a High School All-American in wrestling in 1975 and finished third, second, and first in the state, respectively, in his final three years in High School. He has been inducted into the Farmington High School Sports Hall of Fame.

== University of Michigan ==
Churella attended the University of Michigan where he was a member of the Michigan Wolverines wrestling team from 1976 to 1979. As a wrestler at Michigan, Churella compiled a record of 132–13; his .910 winning percentage is the second highest in University of Michigan wrestling history. He won the NCAA national championship in the 150-pound weight class in 1977 and 1978 and the national championship in the 167-pound weight class as a senior in 1979. He was selected four times as a collegiate wrestling All-American and was also named the most outstanding participant in the 1978 NCAA Division I wrestling championships. Churella also received the 1979 Big Ten Medal of Honor for proficiency in scholarship, athletics and community service. When he graduated from the University of Michigan in 1979, Churella was the school's all-time record-holder in career wins (132), career falls (41) and single-season wins (44).

Churella's collegiate success foreshadowed his qualification for the 1980 Summer Olympics, but the US' boycott of the event prevented the opportunity.

== Coaching career ==
After graduating from Michigan, Churella served as the head wrestling coach at UNLV from 1979 to 1984. While holding that position, Churella established the Las Vegas Collegiate Invitational Tournament, later renamed the Cliff Keen Invitational. After UNLV discontinued its wrestling program, Churella returned to the University of Michigan as an assistant coach from 1985 to 1987.

== Later years ==
Churella later went into the insurance services business and became the president and CEO of FDI Group, in Novi, Michigan. Three of his sons, Mark, Jr., Ryan and Josh were wrestlers at the University of Michigan. Churella returned to the program as an assistant coach from 2007 to 2008. Son Josh Churella joined the Michigan Wolverines wrestling coaching staff in 2012.

Churella was inducted into the University of Michigan Athletic Hall of Honor in 1996 and the National Wrestling Hall of Fame in 1999. He was also a charter member of the Michigan Wrestling Hall of Fame. In 2012, he received the Bob Ufer Award for outstanding service to the University of Michigan Athletic Department.
