= Jay Thomas Evans =

American wrestler (1931–2008)

Tommy Evans
Personal information
- Full name: Jay Thomas Evans
- Born: January 21, 1931 Tulsa, Oklahoma, U.S.
- Died: March 18, 2008 (aged 77) Norman, Oklahoma, U.S.

Sport
- Country: United States
- Sport: Wrestling
- Events: Greco-Roman, Freestyle, and Folkstyle
- College team: Oklahoma
- Club: U.S. Air Force
- Team: USA
Medal record
Representing the United States
Men's freestyle wrestling
Olympic Games
Silver medal – second place	1952 Helsinki	67 kg
Collegiate Wrestling
Representing the Oklahoma Sooners
NCAA Championships
Gold medal – first place	1952 Fort Collins	147 lb
Gold medal – first place	1954 Norman	147 lb
Silver medal – second place	1951 Bethlehem	137 lb

Jay Thomas Evans (January 21, 1931 – March 18, 2008) was an American wrestler. Evans was Olympic silver medalist in freestyle wrestling at the 1952 Summer Olympics. He also competed at the 1956 Summer Olympics in Greco-Roman wrestling.
