= 1975 NCAA Division I Wrestling Championships =

American collegiate wrestling tournament

Tournament information
- Sport: College wrestling
- Location: Princeton, New Jersey
- Dates: March 13, 1975–March 15, 1975
- Host: Princeton University
- Venue: Jadwin Gymnasium

Final positions
- Champions: Iowa (1st title)
- 1st runners-up: Oklahoma
- 2nd runners-up: Oklahoma State
- MVP: Mike Frick (Lehigh)

The 1975 NCAA Division I Wrestling Championships were the 45th NCAA Division I Wrestling Championships to be held. Princeton University in Princeton, New Jersey hosted the tournament at Jadwin Gymnasium.

Iowa took home the team championship with 102 points and two individual champions.

Mike Frick of Lehigh was named the Most Outstanding Wrestler and Bill Kalkbrenner of Oklahoma received the Gorriaran Award.

== Team results ==
Rank	School	Points
1	Iowa	102
2	Oklahoma	77
3	Oklahoma State	68
4	Iowa State	66.5
5	Lehigh	54
6	Wisconsin	41
7	Oregon State	36.5
8	Cal Poly-SLO	36
9	Purdue	34.5
10	Penn State	33

== Individual finals ==
Weight class	Championship match (champion in boldface)
118 lbs	**Shawn Garel**, Oklahoma DEC Jim Brown, Michigan, 8–3
126 lbs	**John Fritz**, Penn State DEC Pat Milkovich, Michigan State, 5–5, 3–1
134 lbs	**Mike Frick**, Lehigh DEC Brian Beatson, Oklahoma, 10–5
142 lbs	**Jim Bennett**, Yale DEC Andre Allen, Northwestern, 5–3
150 lbs	**Chuck Yagla**, Iowa SRD Lee Kemp, Wisconsin, 4–4, 1–1
158 lbs	**Dan Holm**, Iowa DEC John Janiak, Syracuse, 7–6
167 lbs	**Ron Ray**, Oklahoma State DEC Cliff Hatch, Cal Poly-SLO, 8–3
177 lbs	**Mike Lieberman**, Lehigh DEC Chris Campbell, Iowa, 5–4
190 lbs	**Al Nacin**, Iowa State DEC Greg Stevens, Iowa, 8–4
UNL	**Larry Bielenberg**, Oregon State DEC Greg Gibson, Oregon, 8–2
