= Chris Campbell (wrestler) =

American wrestler (born 1954)

Personal information
- Full name: Christopher Lundy Campbell
- Born: September 9, 1954 (age 71) Westfield, New Jersey, U.S.

Sport
- Country: United States
- Sport: Wrestling
- Events: Freestyle; Folkstyle
- College team: Iowa
- Club: Hawkeye Wrestling Club; Sunkist Kids Wrestling Club
- Team: USA
- Coached by: Dan Gable; Gary Kurdelmeier
Medal record
Men's freestyle wrestling
Representing the United States
Olympic Games
Bronze medal – third place	1992 Barcelona	90 kg
World Championships
Gold medal – first place	1981 Skopje	90 kg
Silver medal – second place	1990 Tokyo	90 kg
Collegiate Wrestling
Representing the Iowa Hawkeyes
NCAA Division I Championships
Gold medal – first place	1976 Tucson	177 lb
Gold medal – first place	1977 Norman	177 lb
Silver medal – second place	1975 Princeton	177 lb
Big Ten Championships
Gold medal – first place	1974 Evanston	177 lb
Gold medal – first place	1976 Iowa City	177 lb
Gold medal – first place	1977 Madison	177 lb
Silver medal – second place	1975 Columbus	177 lb

Christopher Lundy Campbell (born September 9, 1954) is an American wrestler. He was a bronze medalist in freestyle wrestling at the 1992 Summer Olympics in Barcelona. He won a gold medal at the 1981 World Wrestling Championships, and a Silver medal at the 1990 World Wrestling Championships. He is the oldest United States wrestler to medal at the Olympic Games. When he won his Olympic medal he was a month away from his 38th birthday.

While wrestling for the University of Iowa, Campbell was a three-time All-American and a two-time NCAA champion, winning titles in 1976 & ’77. His career record of 122-6-3 ranks sixth on Iowa’s all-time career winning percentage list.

Campbell is a vegetarian. He is a native of Westfield, New Jersey, and is a graduate of Westfield High School, University of Iowa, and Cornell Law School.

According to The Seattle Times, "He practices Zen and dabbles in poetry. He's a vegetarian who likes nothing better than tofu stroganoff. He leg-presses 700 pounds, meditates, and quotes everything from The Sermon On the Mount to The Teachings of Buddha".
