= Joe Scarpello =

American wrestler (1923–1999)

Personal information
- Born: January 16, 1923 Omaha, Nebraska, U.S.
- Died: November 9, 1999 (aged 76)
- Weight: 174.5 lb (79 kg)

Sport
- Country: United States
- Sport: Wrestling; Professional Wrestling
- Events: Greco-Roman; Folkstyle
- College team: Iowa
- Team: USA
Medal record
Representing the United States
Men's Greco-Roman wrestling
Collegiate Wrestling
Representing the Iowa Hawkeyes wrestling
NCAA Championships
Gold medal – first place	1947 NCAA Wrestling Championships	Heavyweight
Bronze medal – third place	1948 NCAA Wrestling Championships	Heavyweight
Silver medal – second place	1949 NCAA Wrestling Championships	Heavyweight
Gold medal – first place	1950 NCAA Wrestling Championships	Heavyweight

Joseph J. Scarpello (January 16, 1923 – November 9, 1999) was an American wrestler who competed in the Greco-Roman and later a professional wrestler. Scarpello was also a two-time NCAA wrestling champion at Iowa. He was an alternate to the Olympics in 1948 to gold medalist Glen Brand whom Scarpello had defeated the previous year for the NCAA title.

After graduating from college he became a professional wrestler from 1949 until 1981 where he mainly worked for Verne Gagne's American Wrestling Association in Minnesota.

== Championships and accomplishments ==
- Al Haft Sports
  - American Tag Team Championship (1 time) – with Shag Thomas
- American Wrestling Association
  - AWA Canadian Open Tag Team Championship (1 time) – with Ilio DiPaolo
- George Tragos/Lou Thesz Professional Wrestling Hall of Fame
  - Class of 2003
- Midwest Wrestling Association
  - MWA World Junior Heavyweight Championship (3 times)
- Nebraska Pro Wrestling Hall of Fame
  - Class of 2019
