= Dick Hutton =

American amateur and professional wrestler (1923–2003)

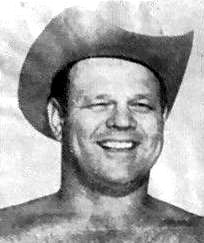
- Hutton in 1962

Personal information
- Born: Richard Heron Avis Hutton; October 4, 1923 Amarillo, Texas, U.S.
- Died: November 24, 2003 (aged 80) Tulsa, Oklahoma, U.S.
- Education: Oklahoma Agricultural and Mechanical College

Professional wrestling career
- Ring name: Dick Hutton
- Billed height: 5 ft 10 in (178 cm)
- Billed weight: 235 lb (107 kg)
- Trained by: Ed Lewis
- Debut: 1952
- Retired: 1964

Medal record

Collegiate Wrestling

Representing Oklahoma A&M

NCAA Championships
Gold medal – first place	1947 Champaign	Heavyweight
Gold medal – first place	1948 Bethlehem	Heavyweight
Gold medal – first place	1950 Cedar Falls	Heavyweight
Silver medal – second place	1949 Fort Collins	Heavyweight

Richard Heron Avis Hutton (October 4, 1923 – November 24, 2003) was an American amateur and professional wrestler. He was a three-time NCAA champion and, as a professional, held the NWA World Heavyweight Championship, making him a one-time world champion in professional wrestling.

== Early life ==
Hutton was born in Amarillo, Texas to Bailey and Gladys Hutton. He had one brother, Jerald Hutton. His family later moved to Tulsa, Oklahoma where he became a two-time state finalist for Daniel Webster High School. Later on Dick joined the U.S. Army and was a veteran of World War II. He attended Oklahoma A&M.

While at Oklahoma A&M he was the NCAA wrestling champion three times, in 1947, 1948 and 1950. In 1949, he lost in the finals to Verne Gagne, a future professional wrestler. In total he was a four-time NCAA finalist, four-time All-American and three-time NCAA champion.

Also while at Oklahoma A&M, he went to compete at the 1948 Summer Olympics, where he finished 7th in the heavyweight division in freestyle wrestling.

== Professional wrestling career ==
Hutton made his debut in 1952, in a loss against Bill Longson. Hutton left Tulsa, as it was primarily a territory for light-heavyweight wrestlers, and went to Texas.

While in Columbus, Ohio, in a territory run by Al Haft, Hutton would wrestle members of the audience. Beating Hutton would've earned the fan $1,000. No one ever won.

Hutton developed a friendship with Lou Thesz. After several competitive training contests with Hutton, Thesz considered him to be the best wrestler he'd ever faced and chose Hutton to be the next NWA World Champion, winning the title from himself. On November 14, 1957, in Toronto's Maple Leaf Gardens 10,000 people saw Hutton beat Thesz for the belt after 35:15, when Thesz submitted to an abdominal stretch.

He teamed regularly with Gene Kiniski in Toronto.

On January 9, 1959, after a championship reign of 421 days, Hutton dropped the belt to Pat O'Connor.

Hutton never really had much other success in professional wrestling. He was criticised by some people for having a lack of charisma with poor drawing ability. However, many other wrestlers praised his wrestling ability.

Hutton was forced into retirement because of heart trouble and other injuries.

== Personal life ==
Hutton was married to Katherine. He died on November 24, 2003, at the age of 80.

== Championships and accomplishments ==
=== Amateur wrestling ===
- National Collegiate Athletic Association
  - NCAA Wrestling Championship (3 times) - in 1947, 1948, and 1950
  - NCAA Hall Of Fame Inductee
- Oklahoma State University
  - Oklahoma State University Wrestling Hall of Fame Inductee
  - National Wrestling Hall of Fame Inductee
- Olympic Games
  - 1948 Olympic Freestyle Wrestling - seventh place

=== Professional wrestling ===
- 50th State Big Time Wrestling
  - NWA Hawaii Heavyweight Championship (1 time)
- Cauliflower Alley Club
  - Other honoree (1994)
- George Tragos/Lou Thesz Professional Wrestling Hall of Fame
  - Class of 2000
- Maple Leaf Wrestling
  - NWA Canadian Open Tag Team Championship (1 time) - with Hard Boiled Haggerty
- National Wrestling Alliance
  - NWA World Heavyweight Championship (1 time)
- NWA Western States Sports
  - NWA North American Tag Team Championship (Amarillo version) (1 time) - with Dory Funk
  - NWA World Tag Team Championship (Amarillo version) (2 times) - with Dory Funk
- Worldwide Wrestling Associates
  - WWA International Television Tag Team Championship (1 time) - with Sam Steamboat
- Other titles
  - Ohio Heavyweight Championship (2 times)
