= NCAA Division I Men's Wrestling Championships =

American collegiate event

- Association: NCAA
- Sport: College wrestling
- Founded: 1928; 98 years ago
- Division: Division I
- No. of teams: 76
- Country: United States
- Most recent champion: Penn State (14th title)
- Most titles: Oklahoma State (34)
- Broadcaster: ESPN
- Website: NCAA.com

The NCAA Division I Men's Wrestling Championship have been held since 1927. In addition to determining the national champion in each weight class, the NCAA Division I Wrestling Championships also determines the All-American wrestlers for each weight. The top eight finishers in each weight class earn All-American status. The top four teams earn podium and team trophy finishes.

Since 1934, the team scoring officially became a permanent feature in the NCAA Wrestling Championships. In 1928 and from 1931–1933, there was only an unofficial team title. Oklahoma A&M (now Oklahoma State) won the 1928 and 1931 unofficial titles. Indiana won the 1932 unofficial title, and in 1933, Iowa State and Oklahoma A&M were unofficial co-champions.

The NCAA Division I Wrestling Championships is a double-elimination tournament for individuals competing in ten weight classes. Thirty-three wrestlers in each weight class qualify through the seven conference championship tournaments. Each of these conference tournaments are allocated a number of automatic qualifying slots in each weight class, and the unallocated slots are filled with at-large selections picked by the NCAA Division I Wrestling Committee based on certain criteria. During the championships, individual match winners earn points based on the level and quality of the victory, which are totaled to determine the team championship standings.

The Oklahoma State Cowboys have won more NCAA team championships than any other school, with 34 titles (while including 3 of them being unofficial), with the most recent being won in 2006. Ed Gallagher coached the Cowboys to their first title in 1928 and won 11 in 13 years from 1928 through 1940. Iowa has won the second most team titles with 24 NCAA titles. Under head coach Dan Gable, Iowa had the longest streak of consecutive titles at nine from 1978 through 1986. Penn State has won 14 titles, Iowa State has won eight titles, and Oklahoma has won seven championships. Only seven other schools have won a team title, with none of those schools having won more than three championships. Since 2011, Penn State under head coach Cael Sanderson has won 13 NCAA team titles. Only the 2001 Minnesota Golden Gophers and 2025 Penn State Nittany Lions have finished the NCAA Tournament with an All-American at every weight class with Minnesota famously winning the team championship despite not having a single finalist.

Long held at host college campuses, since 2000 the tournament has grown exponentially in popularity and as such is now held in major cities at professional sports arenas. Central to the expansion of "March Matness" (a play on March Madness, the nickname for the NCAA basketball tournaments) has been television network ESPN, which broadcasts all days of the tournament live and provides additional feeds dedicated to one particular mat online.

The 2026 championship was held March 19-21, 2026 in Cleveland, Ohio.

Starting in 2025–26, all currently existing NCAA men's wrestling championships added the word "Men's" to their official titles, following the elevation of women's wrestling from the Emerging Sports for Women program to full championship status.

== Results ==
- Prior to 1963, only a single national championship was held for all members of the NCAA; Division II competition began in 1963, with Division III following in 1974.

=== Team results ===
NCAA Division I Wrestling Championships
Year	Host city (Host school)	Host arena	Team championship				Outstanding Wrestler (Team)
Year	Host city (Host school)	Host arena	Winner	Points	Runner-up	Points	Outstanding Wrestler (Team)
1928	Ames, Iowa (Iowa Agricultural College)	State Gymnasium	Oklahoma A&M^{(1)}	—	Iowa Agricultural College; Michigan	—	—
1929	Columbus, Ohio (Ohio State)	Ohio Expo Center Coliseum	Oklahoma A&M^{(2)}	26	Michigan	18	—
1930	State College, Pennsylvania (Penn State)	Rec Hall	Oklahoma A&M^{(3)}	27	Illinois	14	—
1931	Providence, Rhode Island (Brown)	Brown Gymnasium	Oklahoma A&M^{(4)}	29	Iowa Agricultural College	17	—
1932	Bloomington, Indiana (Indiana)	IU Fieldhouse	Indiana	14	Oklahoma A&M	11	Edwin Belshaw (Indiana)
1933	Bethlehem, Pennsylvania (Lehigh)	Taylor Gymnasium	Iowa Agricultural College^{(1)} Oklahoma A&M^{(5)}	—		—	Alan Kelley (Oklahoma A&M)
1934	Ann Arbor, Michigan (Michigan)	Yost Field House	Oklahoma A&M^{(6)}	29	Indiana	19	Ben Bishop (Lehigh)
1935	Bethlehem, Pennsylvania (Lehigh)	Taylor Gymnasium	Oklahoma A&M^{(7)}	36	Oklahoma	18	Ross Flood (Oklahoma A&M)
1936	Lexington, Virginia (Washington & Lee)	Doremus Gymnasium	Oklahoma^{(1)}	14	Central Oklahoma; Oklahoma A&M	10	Wayne Martin (Oklahoma)
1937	Terre Haute, Indiana (Indiana State)	Indiana State Teacher's College Gymnasium	Oklahoma A&M^{(8)}	31	Oklahoma	13	Stanley Hensen (Oklahoma A&M)
1938	State College, Pennsylvania (Penn State)	Rec Hall	Oklahoma A&M^{(9)}	19	Illinois	15	Joe McDaniels (Oklahoma A&M)
1939	Lancaster, Pennsylvania (Franklin & Marshall)	Mayser Physical Education Center	Oklahoma A&M^{(10)}	33	Lehigh	12	Dale Hanson (Minnesota)
1940	Champaign, Illinois (Illinois)	Huff Gymnasium	Oklahoma A&M^{(11)}	24	Indiana	14	Don Nichols (Michigan)
1941	Bethlehem, Pennsylvania (Lehigh)	Taylor Gymnasium	Oklahoma A&M^{(12)}	37	Michigan State	26	Al Whitehurst (Oklahoma A&M)
1942	East Lansing, Michigan (Michigan State)	Jenison Fieldhouse	Oklahoma A&M^{(13)}	31	Michigan State	26	David Arndt (Oklahoma A&M)
1943	Not held due to World War II						
1944	Not held due to World War II						
1945	Not held due to World War II						
1946	Stillwater, Oklahoma (Oklahoma A&M)	Gallagher Hall	Oklahoma A&M^{(14)}	25	Iowa State Teachers College	24	Gerald Leeman (Iowa State Teachers College)
1947	Champaign, Illinois (Illinois)	Huff Gymnasium	Cornell College	25	Iowa State Teachers College	24	Bill Koll (Iowa State Teachers College)
1948	Bethlehem, Pennsylvania (Lehigh)	Taylor Gymnasium	Oklahoma A&M^{(15)}	33	Michigan State	28	Bill Koll (Iowa State Teachers College)
1949	Fort Collins, Colorado (Colorado A&M)	South College Gymnasium	Oklahoma A&M^{(16)}	32	Iowa State Teachers College	27	Charles Hetrick (Oklahoma A&M)
1950	Cedar Falls, Iowa (Iowa State Teachers College)	West Gymnasium	Iowa State Teachers College	30	Purdue	16	Anthony Gizoni (Waynesburg)
1951	Bethlehem, Pennsylvania (Lehigh)	Taylor Gymnasium	Oklahoma^{(2)}	24	Oklahoma A&M	23	Walter Romanowski (Cornell College)
1952	Fort Collins, Colorado (Colorado A&M)	South College Gymnasium	Oklahoma^{(3)}	22	Iowa State Teachers College	21	Tommy Evans (Oklahoma)
1953	State College, Pennsylvania (Penn State)	Rec Hall	Penn State^{(1)}	21	Oklahoma	15	Frank Bettucci (Cornell)
1954	Norman, Oklahoma (Oklahoma)	McCasland Field House	Oklahoma A&M^{(17)}	32	Pittsburgh	17	Tommy Evans (Oklahoma)
1955	Ithaca, New York (Cornell)	Barton Hall	Oklahoma A&M^{(18)}	40	Penn State	31	Edward Eichelberger (Lehigh)
1956	Stillwater, Oklahoma (Oklahoma A&M)	Gallagher Hall	Oklahoma A&M^{(19)}	65	Oklahoma	62	Danny Hodge (Oklahoma)
1957	Pittsburgh, Pennsylvania (Pittsburgh)	Fitzgerald Field House	Oklahoma^{(4)}	73	Pittsburgh	66	Danny Hodge (Oklahoma)
1958	Laramie, Wyoming (Wyoming)	War Memorial Fieldhouse	Oklahoma State^{(20)}	77	Iowa Agricultural College	62	Dick Delgado (Oklahoma)
1959	Iowa City, Iowa (Iowa)	Iowa Field House	Oklahoma State^{(21)}	73	Iowa State	51	Ron Gray (Iowa State)
1960	College Park, Maryland (Maryland)	Cole Field House	Oklahoma^{(5)}	59	Iowa State	40	Dave Auble (Cornell)
1961	Corvallis, Oregon (Oregon State)	Oregon State Coliseum	Oklahoma State^{(22)}	82	Oklahoma	63	Gray Simons (Lock Haven)
1962	Stillwater, Oklahoma (Oklahoma State)	Gallagher Hall	Oklahoma State^{(23)}	82	Oklahoma	45	Gray Simons (Lock Haven)
1963	Kent, Ohio (Kent State)	Memorial Gym	Oklahoma^{(6)}	48	Iowa State	45	Mickey Martin (Oklahoma)
1964	Ithaca, New York (Cornell)	Barton Hall	Oklahoma State^{(24)}	87	Oklahoma	58	Dean Lahr (Colorado)
1965	Laramie, Wyoming (Wyoming)	War Memorial Fieldhouse	Iowa State^{(2)}	87	Oklahoma State	86	Yojiro Uetake (Oklahoma State)
1966	Ames, Iowa (Iowa State)	Iowa State Armory	Oklahoma State^{(25)}	79	Iowa State	70	Yojiro Uetake (Oklahoma State)
1967	Kent, Ohio (Kent State)	Memorial Gym	Michigan State	74	Michigan	63	Rick Sanders (Portland State)
1968	State College, Pennsylvania (Penn State)	Rec Hall	Oklahoma State^{(26)}	81	Iowa State	78	Dwayne Keller (Oklahoma State)
1969	Provo, Utah (BYU)	Smith Fieldhouse	Iowa State^{(3)}	104	Oklahoma	69	Dan Gable (Iowa State)
1970	Evanston, Illinois (Northwestern)	McGaw Memorial Hall	Iowa State^{(4)}	99	Michigan State	84	Larry Owings (Washington)
1971	Auburn, Alabama (Auburn)	Memorial Coliseum	Oklahoma State^{(27)}	94	Iowa State	66	Darrell Keller (Oklahoma State)
1972	College Park, Maryland (Maryland)	Cole Field House	Iowa State^{(5)}	103	Michigan State	72½	Wade Schalles (Clarion)
1973	Seattle, Washington (Washington)	Hec Edmundson Pavilion	Iowa State^{(6)}	85	Oregon State	72½	Greg Strobel (Oregon State)
1974	Ames, Iowa (Iowa State)	Hilton Coliseum	Oklahoma^{(7)}	69½	Michigan	67	Floyd Hitchcock (Bloomsburg)
1975	Princeton, New Jersey (Princeton)	Jadwin Gymnasium	Iowa^{(1)}	102	Oklahoma	77	Mike Frick (Lehigh)
1976	Tucson, Arizona (Arizona)	McKale Center	Iowa^{(2)}	123½	Iowa State	85¾	Chuck Yagla (Iowa)
1977	Norman, Oklahoma (Oklahoma)	McCasland Field House	Iowa State^{(7)}	95½	Oklahoma State	88¾	Nick Gallo (Hofstra)
1978	College Park, Maryland (Maryland)	Cole Field House	Iowa^{(3)}	94½	Iowa State	94	Mark Churella (Michigan)
1979	Ames, Iowa (Iowa State)	Hilton Coliseum	Iowa^{(4)}	112½	Iowa State	88	Bruce Kinseth (Iowa)
1980	Corvallis, Oregon (Oregon State)	Gill Coliseum	Iowa^{(5)}	110¾	Oklahoma State	87	Howard Harris (Oregon State)
1981	Princeton, New Jersey (Princeton)	Jadwin Gymnasium	Iowa^{(6)}	129¾	Oklahoma	100¼	Gene Mills (Syracuse)
1982	Ames, Iowa (Iowa State)	Hilton Coliseum	Iowa^{(7)}	131¾	Iowa State	111	Mark Schultz (Oklahoma)
1983	Oklahoma City, Oklahoma (Oklahoma and Oklahoma State)	Myriad Convention Center	Iowa^{(8)}	155	Oklahoma State	102	Mike Sheets (Oklahoma State)
1984	East Rutherford, New Jersey (Princeton)	Brendan Byrne Arena	Iowa^{(9)}	123¾	Oklahoma State	98	Jim Zalesky (Iowa)
1985	Oklahoma City, Oklahoma (Oklahoma and Oklahoma State)	Myriad Convention Center	Iowa^{(10)}	145¼	Oklahoma	98½	Barry Davis (Iowa)
1986	Iowa City, Iowa (Iowa)	Carver–Hawkeye Arena	Iowa^{(11)}	158	Oklahoma	84¾	Marty Kistler (Iowa)
1987	College Park, Maryland (Maryland)	Cole Field House	Iowa State^{(8)}	133	Iowa	108	John Smith (Oklahoma State)
1988	Ames, Iowa (Iowa State)	Hilton Coliseum	Arizona State	93	Iowa	85½	Scott Turner (NC State)
1989	Oklahoma City, Oklahoma (Oklahoma and Oklahoma State)	Myriad Convention Center	Oklahoma State^{(28)}	91¼	Arizona State	70½	Tim Krieger (Iowa State)
1990	College Park, Maryland (Maryland)	Cole Field House	Oklahoma State^{(29)}	117¾	Arizona State	104¾	Chris Barnes (Oklahoma State)
1991	Iowa City, Iowa (Iowa)	Carver–Hawkeye Arena	Iowa^{(12)}	157	Oklahoma State	108¾	Jeff Prescott (Penn State)
1992	Oklahoma City, Oklahoma (Oklahoma and Oklahoma State)	Myriad Convention Center	Iowa^{(13)}	149	Oklahoma State	100½	Tom Brands (Iowa)
1993	Ames, Iowa (Iowa State)	Hilton Coliseum	Iowa^{(14)}	123¾	Penn State	87½	Terry Steiner (Iowa)
1994	Chapel Hill, North Carolina (North Carolina)	Dean Smith Center	Oklahoma State^{(30)}	94¾	Iowa	76½	Pat Smith (Oklahoma State)
1995	Iowa City, Iowa (Iowa)	Carver–Hawkeye Arena	Iowa^{(15)}	134	Oregon State	77½	T.J. Jaworsky (North Carolina)
1996	Minneapolis, Minnesota (Minnesota)	Williams Arena	Iowa^{(16)}	122½	Iowa State	78½	Les Gutches (Oregon State)
1997	Cedar Falls, Iowa (Northern Iowa)	UNI-Dome	Iowa^{(17)}	170	Oklahoma State	113½	Lincoln McIlravy (Iowa)
1998	Cleveland, Ohio (Cleveland State)	CSU Convocation Center	Iowa^{(18)}	115	Minnesota	102	Joe Williams (Iowa)
1999	College Township, Pennsylvania (Penn State)	Bryce Jordan Center	Iowa^{(19)}	100½	Minnesota	98½	Cael Sanderson (Iowa State)
2000	St. Louis, Missouri	Kiel Center	Iowa^{(20)}	116	Iowa State	109½	Cael Sanderson (Iowa State)
2001	Iowa City, Iowa (Iowa)	Carver–Hawkeye Arena	Minnesota^{(1)}	138½	Iowa	125½	Cael Sanderson (Iowa State)
2002	Albany, New York	Pepsi Arena	Minnesota^{(2)}	126½	Iowa State	104	Cael Sanderson (Iowa State)
2003	Kansas City, Missouri	Kemper Arena	Oklahoma State^{(31)}	143	Minnesota	104½	Eric Larkin (Arizona State)
2004	St. Louis, Missouri	Savvis Center	Oklahoma State^{(32)}	123½	Iowa	82	Jesse Jantzen (Harvard)
2005	St. Louis, Missouri	Savvis Center	Oklahoma State^{(33)}	153	Michigan	83	Greg Jones (West Virginia)
2006	Oklahoma City, Oklahoma	Ford Center	Oklahoma State^{(34)}	122½	Minnesota	84	Ben Askren (Missouri)
2007	Auburn Hills, Michigan	The Palace of Auburn Hills	Minnesota^{(3)}	98	Iowa State	88½	Derek Moore (UC Davis)
2008	St. Louis, Missouri	Scottrade Center	Iowa^{(21)}	117½	Ohio State	79	Brent Metcalf (Iowa)
2009	St. Louis, Missouri	Scottrade Center	Iowa^{(22)}	96½	Ohio State	92	Darrion Caldwell (NC State)
2010	Omaha, Nebraska	Qwest Center Omaha	Iowa^{(23)}	134½	Cornell	90	Jayson Ness (Minnesota)
2011	Philadelphia, Pennsylvania	Wells Fargo Center	Penn State^{(2)}	107½	Cornell	93½	Anthony Robles (Arizona State)
2012	St. Louis, Missouri	Scottrade Center	Penn State^{(3)}	143	Minnesota	117½	David Taylor (Penn State)
2013	Des Moines, Iowa	Wells Fargo Arena	Penn State^{(4)}	123½	Oklahoma State	119½	Kyle Dake (Cornell)
2014	Oklahoma City, Oklahoma	Chesapeake Energy Arena	Penn State^{(5)}	109½	Minnesota	104	David Taylor (Penn State)
2015	St. Louis, Missouri	Scottrade Center	Ohio State	102	Iowa	84	Logan Stieber (Ohio State)
2016	New York, New York	Madison Square Garden	Penn State^{(6)}	123	Oklahoma State	97.5	Kyle Snyder (Ohio State)
2017	St. Louis, Missouri	Scottrade Center	Penn State^{(7)}	146½	Ohio State	110	Zain Retherford (Penn State)
2018	Cleveland, Ohio	Quicken Loans Arena	Penn State^{(8)}	141½	Ohio State	134½	Bo Nickal (Penn State)
2019	Pittsburgh, Pennsylvania	PPG Paints Arena	Penn State^{(9)}	137½	Ohio State	96½	Mekhi Lewis (Virginia Tech)
2020	Minneapolis, Minnesota	U.S. Bank Stadium	Not held due to COVID-19				
2021	St. Louis, Missouri	Enterprise Center	Iowa^{(24)}	129	Penn State	113½	Shane Griffth (Stanford)
2022	Detroit, Michigan	Little Caesars Arena	Penn State^{(10)}	131.5	Michigan	95	Gable Steveson (Minnesota)
2023	Tulsa, Oklahoma	BOK Center	Penn State^{(11)}	137.5	Iowa	82.5	Vito Arujau (Cornell)
2024	Kansas City, Missouri	T-Mobile Center	Penn State^{(12)}	172.5	Cornell	72.5	Aaron Brooks (Penn State)
2025	Philadelphia, Pennsylvania	Wells Fargo Center	Penn State^{(13)}	177	Nebraska	117	Carter Starocci (Penn State)
2026	Cleveland, Ohio	Rocket Arena	Penn State^{(14)}	181.5	Oklahoma State	131	Mitchell Mesenbrink (Penn State)
2027	St. Louis, Missouri	Enterprise Center					
2028	Minneapolis, Minnesota	U.S. Bank Stadium					

=== Individual results ===
==== 1928 ====
Year	115	125	135	145	158	175	Unlimited
1928	Harold DeMarsh (1/1)	Ralph Lupton (1/1)	Arthur Holding (1/1)	Melvin Clodfelter (1/1)	Leslie Beers (1/1)	George Rule (1/1)	Earl McCready (1/3)

==== 1929–1931 ====
Year	115	125	135	145	155	165	175	Unlimited
1929	Joe Sapora (1/2)	Laurance Mantooth (1/2)	George Minot (1/1)	George Bancroft (1/1)	Jack van Bebber (1/3)	Conrad Caldwell (1/3)	Glenn Stafford (1/1)	Earl McCready (2/3)
1930	Joe Sapora (2/2)	Laurance Mantooth (2/2)	Hugh Linn (1/1)	Hardie Lewis (1/1)	Otto Kelly (1/1)	Jack van Bebber (2/3)	Conrad Caldwell (2/3)	Earl McCready (3/3)
1931	John Engel (1/1)	Bobby Pearce (1/1)	Richard Cole (1/1)	Bill Doyle (1/1)	Leroy McGuirk (1/1)	Jack van Bebber (3/3)	Conrad Caldwell (3/3)	Jack Riley (1/2)

==== 1932 ====
Year	123	134	145	158	174	191	Unlimited
1932	Joe Puerta (1/1)	Edwin Belshaw (1/1)	Hardie Lewis (2/2)	Carl Dougovito (1/1)	Robert Hess (1/2)	Kermit Blosser (1/1)	Jack Riley (2/2)

==== 1933–1935 ====
Year	118	126	135	145	155	165	175	Unlimited
1933	Rex Peery (1/3)	Ross Flood (1/3)	Patrick Devine (1/1)	Alan Kelley (1/2)	Merrill Frevert (1/1)	George Martin (1/1)	Robert Hess (2/2)	Ralph Teague (1/2)
1934	Rex Peery (2/3)	Ross Flood (2/3)	Wayne Martin (1/3)	Alan Kelley (2/2)	Ben Bishop (1/1)	Marion Foreman (1/1)	Richard Voliva (1/1)	Ralph Teague (2/2)
1935	Rex Peery (3/3)	Ross Flood (3/3)	Vernon Sisney (1/1)	Wayne Martin (2/3)	Frank Lewis (1/1)	Howard Johnston (1/1)	Ralph Silverstein (1/1)	Charles McDaniel (1/1)

==== 1936 ====
Year	123	134	145	158	174	191	Unlimited
1936	Ted Anderson (1/1)	Wayne Martin (3/3)	Harley Strong (1/1)	Walter Jacob (1/1)	Harry Broadbent (1/1)	Ray Clemons (1/1)	Howell Scobwy (1/1)

==== 1937–1938 ====
Year	118	126	135	145	155	165	175	Unlimited
1937	Joe McDaniel (1/3)	Dale Brand (1/1)	Ray Cheney (1/1)	Stanley Henson (1/3)	Bill Keas (1/1)	Harvey Base (1/1)	John Whitaker (1/1)	Lloyd Ricks (1/1)
1938	Joe McDaniel (2/3)	Allen Sapora (1/1)	David Matthews (1/1)	Stanley Henson (2/3)	Dale Scrivens (1/1)	John Ginay (1/1)	John Harkness (1/1)	Charles McDaniel (1/1)

==== 1939–1947 ====
Year	121	128	136	145	155	165	175	Unlimited
1939	Joe McDaniel (3/3)	Dale Hanson (1/1)	Archie Deutschman (1/1)	Harold Nichols (1/1)	Stanley Henson (3/3)	Henry Matthes (1/1)	Chris Traicoff (1/1)	Johnny Harrell (1/1)
1940	Robert Antonacci (1/1)	Harold Byrd (1/1)	Al Whitehurst (1/2)	Harold Masem (1/1)	Vernon Logan (1/2)	Gene Grenard (1/1)	Don Nichols (1/1)	George Downes (1/1)
1941	Merle Jennings (1/2)	Burl Jennings (1/2)	Al Whitehurst (2/2)	David Arndt (1/3)	Earl van Bebber (1/1)	Virgil Smith (1/2)	Dick DiBatista (1/2)	Leonard Levy (1/1)
1942	Merle Jennings (2/2)	Burl Jennings (2/2)	Bill Maxwell (1/1)	David Arndt (2/3)	Vernon Logan (2/2)	Virgil Smith (2/2)	Dick DiBatista (2/2)	Loyd Arms (1/1)
1946	Cecil Mott (1/1)	Gerald Leeman (1/1)	David Arndt (3/3)	Bill Koll (1/3)	Bill Courtright (1/1)	David Shapiro (1/1)	George Dorsch (1/1)	George Bollos (1/1)
1947	Dick Hauser (1/1)	Russ Bush (1/1)	Lowell Lange (1/3)	Bill Koll (2/3)	Gale Mikles (1/1)	Bill Nelson (1/3)	Joe Scarpello (1/2)	Dick Hutton (1/3)

==== 1948 ====
Year	114	125	136	147	160	174	191	Unlimited
1948	Arnold Plaza (1/2)	George Lewis (1/1)	Dick Dickenson (1/1)	Bill Koll (3/3)	Jack St. Clair (1/1)	Glen Brand (1/1)	Verne Gagne (1/2)	Dick Hutton (2/3)

==== 1949–1950 ====
Year	121	128	136	145	155	165	175	Unlimited
1949	Arnold Plaza (2/2)	Charles Hetrick (1/1)	Lowell Lange (2/3)	Keith Young (1/3)	Bill Nelson (2/3)	Bill Smith (1/2)	Jim Gregerson (1/1)	Verne Gagne (2/2)
1950	Tony Gizoni (1/2)	Joe Patacsill (1/1)	Lowell Lange (3/3)	Keith Young (2/3)	Bill Nelson (3/3)	Bill Smith (2/2)	Joe Scarpello (2/2)	Dick Hutton (3/3)

==== 1951 ====
Year	123	130	137	147	157	167	177	Unlimited
1951	Tony Gizoni (2/2)	Walter Romanowski (1/1)	George Layman (1/2)	Keith Young (3/3)	Phil Smith (1/1)	Gene Gibbons (1/1)	Grover Rains (1/1)	Brad Glass (1/1)

==== 1952–1965 ====
Year	115	123	130	137	147	157	167	177	191	Unlimited
1952	Hugh Peery (1/3)	Bill Borders (1/1)	Gene Lybbert (1/1)	George Layman (2/2)	Tommy Evans (1/2)	Bill Weick (1/2)	Joe Lemyre (1/1)	Bentley Lyon (1/1)	Harry Lanzi (1/1)	Gene Nicks (1/2)
1953	Hugh Peery (2/3)	Dick Mueller (1/1)	Norvard Nalan (1/1)	Len DeAugustino (1/1)	Frank Bettucci (1/1)	Jim Harmon (1/1)	Don Dickason (1/1)	Ned Bass (1/2)	Hud Samson (1/1)	Dan McNair (1/1)
1954	Hugh Peery (3/3)	Dick Govig (1/1)	Norvard Nalan (1/1)	Myron Roderick (1/3)	Tommy Evans (2/2)	Bob Hoke (1/1)	Joe Solomon (1/1)	Ned Bass (2/2)	Peter Blair (1/2)	Gene Nicks (2/2)
1955	Terry McCann (1/2)	Ed Peery (1/3)	Myron Roderick (2/3)	Larry Fornicola (1/1)	Eddie Eichelberger (1/2)	Bill Weick (2/2)	Fred Davis (1/1)	Dan Hodge (1/3)	Peter Blair (2/2)	Bill Oberly (1/1)
1956	Terry McCann (2/2)	Ed Peery (2/3)	Myron Roderick (3/3)	Jim Sinadinos (1/1)	Eddie Eichelberger (2/2)	Larry Ten Pas (1/1)	Ed DeWitt (1/1)	Dan Hodge (2/3)	Ken Leuer (1/1)	Gordon Roesler (1/1)
1957	Dick Delgado (1/2)	Ed Peery (3/3)	John Johnston (1/1)	Joe Gratto (1/1)	Simon Roberts (1/1)	Douglas Blubaugh (1/1)	Tom Alberts (1/1)	Dan Hodge (3/3)	Ron Schrif (1/1)	Bob Norman (1/2)
1958	Dick Delgado (2/2)	Paul Powell (1/1)	Lee Anderson (1/1)	Paul Aubrey (1/1)	Ron Gray (1/2)	Dick Beattle (1/2)	Duane Murty (1/1)	Gary Kurdelmeier (1/1)	Ken Madlow (1/1)	Bob Norman (2/2)
1959	Andy Fitch (1/1)	Dave Auble (1/2)	Stan Abel (1/2)	Larry Hayes (1/3)	Ron Gray (2/2)	Dick Beattle (2/2)	Ed Hamer (1/1)	Jim Craig (1/1)	Art Baker (1/1)	Ted Ellis (1/1)
1960	Gray Simons (1/3)	Dave Auble (2/2)	Stan Abel (2/2)	Les Anderson (1/1)	Larry Hayes (2/3)	Art Kraft (1/1)	Dick Balinger (1/1)	Roy Conrad (1/1)	George Goodner (1/2)	Dale Lewis (1/2)
1961	Gray Simons (2/3)	DuWayne Miller (1/1)	Larry Lauchle (1/1)	Norm Young (1/1)	Larry Hayes (3/3)	Phil Kinyon (1/1)	Don Conway (1/1)	Bob Johnson (1/2)	Lenard Lordino (1/1)	Dale Lewis (2/2)
1962	Gray Simons (3/3)	Masaaki Hatta (1/1)	Mickey Martin (1/2)	Bill Carter (1/1)	Mike Natvig (1/2)	Jack Flasche (1/1)	Ronnie Clinton (1/1)	Bob Johnson (2/2)	Wayne Baughman (1/1)	Sherwyn Thorson (1/1)
1963	Arthur Maughan (1/1)	Mike Nissen (1/1)	Mickey Martin (2/2)	Bill Dotson (1/1)	Mike Natvig (2/2)	Kirk Pendleton (1/1)	Jim Harrison (1/1)	Dean Lahr (1/2)	Jack Barden (1/1)	Jim Nance (1/2)
1964	Terry Finn (1/1)	Fred Powell (1/1)	Yojiro Uetake (1/3)	Mike Sager (1/1)	Jerry Stanley (1/1)	Gordon Hassman (1/1)	Don Millard (1/1)	Dean Lahr (2/2)	Harry Housaka (1/1)	Joe James (1/1)
1965	Takada Haata (1/1)	Mike Caruso (1/3)	Yojiro Uetake (2/3)	Bill Stuart (1/1)	Veryl Long (1/1)	Bob Kopnisky (1/1)	Greg Ruth (1/2)	Tom Peckham (1/2)	Jack Brisco (1/1)	Jim Nance (2/2)

==== 1966–1969 ====
Year	115	123	130	137	145	152	160	167	177	190	Unlimited
1966	Rick Sanders (1/2)	Mike Caruso (2/3)	Yojiro Uetake (3/3)	Gene Davis (1/1)	Bill Blacksmith (1/1)	Dick Cook (1/1)	Greg Ruth (2/2)	Deve Reinbolt (1/1)	Tom Peckham (2/2)	Bill Harlow (1/1)	Dave Porter (1/2)
1967	Rick Sanders (2/2)	Mike Caruso (3/3)	David McGuire (1/2)	Dale Anderson (1/2)	Don Henderson (1/1)	Jim Kamman (1/1)	Vic Marucci (1/1)	George Radman (1/1)	Fred Fozzard (1/1)	Tom Schlendorf (1/1)	Curley Culp (1/1)
1968	Ken Melchior (1/1)	Dwayne Keller (1/2)	Dan Gable (1/2)	Dale Anderson (2/2)	Dale Bahr (1/1)	Wayne Wells (1/1)	Reg Wicks (1/1)	Mike Gallego (1/1)	Bob Justice (1/1)	Nick Carollo (1/1)	Dave Porter (2/2)
1969	John Miller (1/1)	Wayne Boyd (1/1)	David McGuire (2/2)	Dan Gable (2/2)	Mike Grant (1/2)	Gobel Kline (1/1)	Cleo McGlory (1/1)	Jason Smith (1/1)	Chuck Jean (1/2)	Tom Kline (1/1)	Jess Lewis (1/2)

==== 1970–1986 ====
Year	118	126	134	142	150	158	167	177	190	Unlimited
1970	Greg Johnson (1/3)	Dwayne Keller (2/2)	Darrell Keller (1/2)	Larry Owings (1/1)	Mike Grant (2/2)	Dave Martin (1/1)	Jason Smith (1/1)	Chuck Jean (2/2)	Geoff Baum (1/2)	Jess Lewis (2/2)
1971	Greg Johnson (2/3)	Yoshiro Fujita (1/1)	Roger Weigel (1/1)	Darrell Keller (2/2)	Stan Dziedzic (1/1)	Carl Adams (1/2)	Andy Matter (1/2)	Geoff Baum (2/2)	Ben Peterson (1/2)	Greg Wojciechowski (1/1)
1972	Greg Johnson (3/3)	Pat Milkovich (1/2)	Gary Barton (1/1)	Tom Milkovich (1/1)	Wade Schalles (1/2)	Carl Adams (2/2)	Andy Matter (2/2)	Bill Murdoch (1/1)	Ben Peterson (2/2)	Chris Taylor (1/2)
1973	Dan Sherman (1/1)	Mark Massery (1/1)	Don Rohn (1/1)	Dan Muthler (1/1)	Jarrett Hubbard (1/2)	Wade Schalles (2/2)	Bill Simpson (1/1)	Rich Binek (1/1)	Greg Strobel (1/2)	Chris Taylor (2/2)
1974	Gary Breece (1/1)	Pat Milkovich (2/2)	Tom Sculley (1/1)	Rick Lawinger (1/1)	Jarrett Hubbard (2/2)	Rod Kilgore (1/2)	Doug Wyn (1/1)	Floyd Hitchock (1/1)	Greg Strobel (2/2)	Jim Woods (1/1)
1975	Shawn Garel (1/1)	John Fritz (1/1)	Mike Frick (1/2)	Jim Bennett (1/1)	Chuck Yagla (1/2)	Dan Holm (1/1)	Ron Ray (1/1)	Mike Lieberman (1/1)	Al Nacin (1/1)	Larry Belenberg (1/1)
1976	Mark DiGirolamo (1/1)	Jack Reinwand (1/1)	Mike Frick (2/2)	Brad Smith (1/1)	Chuck Yagla (2/2)	Leroy Kemp (1/3)	Pat Christenson (1/1)	Chris Campbell (1/2)	Evan Johnson (1/1)	Jimmy Jackson (1/3)
1977	Jim Haines (1/1)	Nick Gallo (1/1)	Pat Neu (1/1)	Steve Barrett (1/1)	Mark Churella (1/3)	Leroy Kemp (2/3)	Rod Kilgore (2/2)	Chris Campbell (2/2)	Frank Santana (1/1)	Jimmy Jackson (2/3)
1978	Andy Daniels (1/1)	Mick Land (1/1)	Ken Mallory (1/1)	Dan Hicks (1/2)	Mark Churella (2/3)	Leroy Kemp (3/3)	Keith Stearns (1/1)	Mark Lieberman (1/2)	Ron Jeidy (1/1)	Jimmy Jackson (3/3)
1979	Gene Mills (1/2)	Randy Lewis (1/2)	Darryl Burley (1/2)	Dan Hicks (2/2)	Bruce Kinseth (1/1)	Kelly Ward (1/1)	Mark Churella (3/3)	Mark Lieberman (2/2)	Eric Wals (1/1)	Fred Bohna (1/1)
1980	Joe Gonzales (1/1)	John Azevedo (1/1)	Randy Lewis (2/2)	Leeroy Smith (1/1)	Andy Rein (1/1)	Rick Stewart (1/2)	Matt Reiss (1/1)	Ed Banach (1/3)	Noel Loban (1/1)	Howard Harris (1/1)
1981	Gene Mills (2/2)	Dan Cuestas (1/2)	Jim Gibbons (1/1)	Andre Metzger (1/2)	Nate Carr (1/3)	Rick Stewart (2/2)	Mark Schultz (1/3)	Ed Banach (2/3)	Tom Martucci (1/1)	Lou Banach (1/2)
1982	Barry Davis (1/3)	Dan Cuestas (2/2)	C.D. Mock (1/1)	Andre Metzger (2/2)	Nate Carr (2/3)	Jim Zalesky (1/3)	Dave Schultz (1/1)	Mark Schultz (2/3)	Pete Bush (1/1)	Bruce Baumgartner (1/1)
1983	Adam Cuestas (1/1)	Barry Davis (2/3)	Clar Anderson (1/1)	Darryl Burley (2/2)	Nate Carr (3/3)	Jim Zalesky (2/3)	Mike Sheets (1/2)	Mark Schultz (3/3)	Ed Banach (3/3)	Lou Banach (2/2)
1984	Carl DeStefanis (1/1)	Kevin Darkus (1/1)	Scott Lynch (1/1)	Jesse Reyes (1/1)	Kenny Monday (1/1)	Jim Zalesky(3/3)	Mike Sheets (2/2)	Jim Scherr (1/1)	Bill Scherr (1/1)	Tab Thacker (1/1)
1985	Ricky Bonomo (1/3)	Barry Davis (3/3)	Jim Jordan (1/2)	Joe Gibbons (1/1)	Eddie Urbano (1/1)	Marty Kistler (1/2)	Chris Edmonds (1/1)	Melvin Douglas (1/2)	Dan Chald (1/1)	Bill Hyman (1/1)
1986	Ricky Bonomo (2/3)	Brad Penrith (1/1)	Jim Jordan (2/2)	Kevin Dresser (1/1)	Jim Heffernan (1/1)	Jude Skove (1/1)	Marty Kistler (2/2)	Melvin Douglas (2/2)	Duane Goldman (1/1)	Kirk Trost (1/1)

==== 1987–1998 ====
Year	118	126	134	142	150	158	167	177	190	275
1987	Ricky Bonomo (3/3)	Billy Kelly (1/1)	John Smith (1/2)	Pete Yozzo (1/1)	Tim Krieger (1/1)	Steve Carter (1/1)	Royce Alger (1/2)	Rico Chiapparelli (1/1)	Eric Voelker (1/2)	Carlton Haselrig (1/3)
1988	Jack Cuvo (1/2)	Jim Martin (1/1)	John Smith (2/2)	Pat Santoro (1/2)	Scott Turner (1/1)	Rob Koll (1/1)	Mike Van Arsdale (1/1)	Royce Alger (2/2)	Mark Coleman (1/1)	Carlton Haselrig (2/3)
1989	Jack Cuvo (2/2)	Kendall Cross (1/1)	Sean O'Day (1/1)	Pat Santoro (2/2)	Tim Krieger (2/2)	Dan St. John (1/2)	David Lee (1/1)	Chris Barnes (1/2)	Eric Voelker (2/2)	Carlton Haselrig (3/3)
1990	Jack Griffin (1/1)	Terry Brands (1/2)	Tom Brands (1/3)	Joe Reynolds (1/1)	Brian Dolph (1/1)	Pat Smith (1/4)	Dan St. John (2/2)	Chris Barnes (2/2)	Matt Ruppel (1/1)	Kurt Angle (1/2)
1991	Jeff Prescott (1/2)	Jason Kelber (1/1)	Tom Brands (2/3)	Scott Collins (1/1)	Matt DeMaray (1/2)	Pat Smith (2/4)	Mark Reiland (1/1)	Marty Morgan (1/1)	Paul Keysaw (1/1)	Jon Llewellyn (1/1)
1992	Jeff Prescott (2/2)	Terry Brands (2/2)	Tom Brands (3/3)	Troy Steiner (1/1)	Matt DeMaray (2/2)	Pat Smith (3/4)	Charlie Jones (1/1)	Kevin Randleman (1/2)	Mark Kerr (1/1)	Kurt Angle (2/2)
1993	Sammie Henson (1/2)	Tony Purler (1/1)	TJ Jaworsky (1/3)	Lincoln McIlravy (1/3)	Terry Steiner (1/1)	Marcus Mollica (1/2)	Ray Miller (1/1)	Kevin Randleman (2/2)	Rex Holman (1/1)	Sylvester Terkay (1/1)
1994	Sammie Henson (2/2)	David Hirsch (1/1)	TJ Jaworsky (2/3)	Alan Fried (1/1)	Lincoln McIlravy (2/3)	Pat Smith (4/4)	Mark Branch (1/2)	Dean Morrison (1/1)	Joel Sharratt (1/1)	Kerry McCoy (1/2)
1995	Kelvin Jackson (1/1)	Jeff McGinness (1/1)	TJ Jaworsky (3/3)	John Hughes (1/1)	Steve Marlanetti (1/1)	Ernest Benion (1/1)	Marcus Mollica (2/2)	Les Gutches (1/2)	JJ McGrew (1/1)	Tolly Thompson (1/1)
1996	Sheldon Thomas (1/1)	Sanshiro Abe (1/1)	Cary Kolat (1/2)	Bill Zadick (1/1)	Chris Bono (1/1)	Joe Williams (1/3)	Daryl Weber (1/1)	Les Gutches (2/2)	John Kading (1/1)	Jeff Walter (1/1)
1997	Jesse Whitmer (1/1)	Eric Guerrero (1/3)	Mark Ironside (1/2)	Cary Kolat (2/2)	Lincoln McIlravy (3/3)	Joe Williams (2/3)	Mark Branch (2/2)	Barry Weldon (1/1)	Lee Fullhart (1/1)	Kerry McCoy (2/2)
1998	Teague Moore (1/1)	Eric Guerrero (2/3)	Mark Ironside (2/2)	Jeff McGinness (2/2)	Eric Siebert (1/1)	Dwight Gardner (1/1)	Joe Williams (3/3)	Mitch Clark (1/1)	Tim Hartung (1/2)	Stephen Neal (1/2)

==== 1999–2026 ====
Year	125	133	141	149	157	165	174	184	197	285
1999	Stephen Abas (1/3)	Eric Guerrero (3/3)	Doug Schwab (1/1)	TJ Williams (1/2)	Casey Cunningham (1/1)	Kirk White (1/1)	Glenn Pritzlaff (1/1)	Cael Sanderson (1/4)	Tim Hartung (2/2)	Stephen Neal (2/2)
2000	Jermey Hunter (1/1)	Eric Jurgens (1/2)	Carl Perry (1/1)	Tony Davis (1/1)	Brett Matter (1/1)	Donny Pritzlaff (1/2)	Bryan Tucker (1/1)	Cael Sanderson (2/4)	Brad Vering (1/1)	Brock Lesnar (1/1)
2001	Stephen Abas (2/3)	Eric Jurgens (2/2)	Michael Lightner (1/1)	Adam Tirapelle (1/1)	TJ Williams (2/2)	Donny Pritzlaff (2/2)	Josh Koscheck (1/1)	Cael Sanderson (3/4)	Mark Muñoz (1/1)	John Lockhart (1/1)
2002	Stephen Abas (3/3)	Johnny Thompson (1/2)	Aaron Holker (1/1)	Jared Lawrence (1/1)	Luke Becker (1/1)	Joe Heskett (1/1)	Greg Jones (1/3)	Rob Rohn (1/1)	Cael Sanderson (4/4)	Tommy Rowlands (1/2)
2003	Travis Lee (1/2)	Johnny Thompson (2/2)	Teyon Ware (1/2)	Eric Larkin (1/1)	Ryan Bertin (1/2)	Matt Lackey (1/1)	Robbie Waller (1/1)	Jake Rosholt (1/3)	Damion Hahn (1/2)	Steve Mocco (1/2)
2004	Jason Powell (1/1)	Zach Roberson (1/1)	Cliff Moore (1/1)	Jesse Jantzen (1/1)	Matt Gentry (1/1)	Troy Letters (1/1)	Chris Pendleton (1/2)	Greg Jones (2/3)	Damion Hahn (2/2)	Tommy Rowlands (2/2)
2005	Joe Dubuque (1/2)	Travis Lee (2/2)	Teyon Ware (2/2)	Zach Esposito (1/1)	Ryan Bertin (2/2)	Johny Hendricks (1/2)	Chris Pendleton (2/2)	Greg Jones (3/3)	Jake Rosholt (2/3)	Steve Mocco (2/2)
2006	Joe Dubuque (2/2)	Matt Valenti (1/2)	Nate Gallick (1/1)	Dustin Schlatter (1/1)	Ben Charrington (1/1)	Johny Hendricks (2/2)	Ben Askren (1/2)	Shane Webster (1/1)	Jake Rosholt (3/3)	Cole Konrad (1/2)
2007	Paul Donahoe (1/1)	Matt Valenti (2/2)	Derek Moore (1/1)	Gregor Gillespie (1/1)	Trent Paulson (1/1)	Mark Perry (1/2)	Ben Askren (2/2)	Jake Herbert (1/2)	Josh Glenn (1/1)	Cole Konrad (2/2)
2008	Angel Escobedo (1/1)	Coleman Scott (1/1)	Jeff Jaggers (1/2)	Brent Metcalf (1/2)	Jordan Leen (1/1)	Mark Perry (2/2)	Keith Gavin (1/1)	Mike Pucillo (1/1)	Phil Davis (1/1)	Dustin Fox (1/1)
2009	Troy Nickerson (1/1)	Franklin Gómez (1/1)	Jeff Jaggers (2/2)	Darrion Caldwell (1/1)	Jordan Burroughs (1/2)	Jarod King (1/1)	Steve Luke (1/1)	Jake Herbert (2/2)	Jake Varner (1/2)	Mark Ellis (1/1)
2010	Matt McDonough (1/2)	Jayson Ness (1/1)	Kyle Dake (1/4)	Brent Metcalf (2/2)	JP O'Connor (1/1)	Andrew Howe (1/1)	Jay Borschel (1/1)	Max Askren (1/1)	Jake Varner (2/2)	David Zabriskie (1/1)
2011	Anthony Robles (1/1)	Jordan Oliver (1/2)	Kellen Russell (1/2)	Kyle Dake (2/4)	Bubba Jenkins (1/1)	Jordan Burroughs (2/2)	Jon Reader (1/1)	Quentin Wright (1/2)	Dustin Kilgore (1/1)	Zach Rey (1/1)
2012	Matt McDonough (2/2)	Logan Stieber (1/4)	Kellen Russell (2/2)	Frank Molinaro (1/1)	Kyle Dake (3/4)	David Taylor (1/2)	Ed Ruth (1/3)	Steve Bosak (1/1)	Cam Simaz (1/1)	Tony Nelson (1/2)
2013	Jesse Delgado (1/2)	Logan Stieber (2/4)	Kendric Maple (1/1)	Jordan Oliver (2/2)	Derek St. John (1/1)	Kyle Dake (4/4)	Chris Perry (1/2)	Ed Ruth (2/3)	Quentin Wright (2/2)	Tony Nelson (2/2)
2014	Jesse Delgado (2/2)	Tony Ramos (1/1)	Logan Stieber (3/4)	Jason Tsirtsis (1/1)	Alex Dieringer (1/3)	David Taylor (2/2)	Chris Perry (2/2)	Ed Ruth (3/3)	J'den Cox (1/3)	Nick Gwiazdowski (1/2)
2015	Nathan Tomasello (1/1)	Cody Brewer (1/1)	Logan Stieber (4/4)	Drake Houdashelt (1/1)	Isaiah Martinez (1/2)	Alex Dieringer (2/3)	Matt Brown (1/1)	Gabe Dean (1/2)	Kyven Gadson (1/1)	Nick Gwiazdowski (2/2)
2016	Nico Megaludis (1/1)	Nahshon Garrett (1/1)	Dean Heil (1/2)	Zain Retherford (1/3)	Isaiah Martinez (2/2)	Alex Dieringer (3/3)	Myles Martin (1/1)	Gabe Dean (2/2)	J'den Cox (2/3)	Kyle Snyder (1/3)
2017	Darian Cruz (1/1)	Cory Clark (1/1)	Dean Heil (2/2)	Zain Retherford (2/3)	Jason Nolf (1/3)	Vincenzo Joseph (1/2)	Mark Hall (1/1)	Bo Nickal (1/3)	J'den Cox (3/3)	Kyle Snyder (2/3)
2018	Spencer Lee (1/3)	Seth Gross (1/1)	Yianni Diakomihalis (1/4)	Zain Retherford (3/3)	Jason Nolf (2/3)	Vincenzo Joseph (2/2)	Zahid Valencia (1/2)	Bo Nickal (2/3)	Michael Macchiavello (1/1)	Kyle Snyder (3/3)
2019	Spencer Lee (2/3)	Nick Suriano (1/2)	Yianni Diakomihalis (2/4)	Anthony Ashnault (1/1)	Jason Nolf (3/3)	Mekhi Lewis (1/1)	Zahid Valencia (2/2)	Drew Foster (1/1)	Bo Nickal (3/3)	Anthony Cassar (1/1)
2020	Not held because of the COVID-19 pandemic									
2021	Spencer Lee (3/3)	Roman Bravo-Young (1/2)	Nick Lee (1/2)	Austin O'Connor (1/2)	David Carr (1/2)	Shane Griffith (1/1)	Carter Starocci (1/5)	Aaron Brooks (1/4)	A.J. Ferrari (1/1)	Gable Steveson (1/2)
2022	Nick Suriano (2/2)	Roman Bravo-Young (2/2)	Nick Lee (2/2)	Yianni Diakomihalis (3/4)	Ryan Deakin (1/1)	Keegan O'Toole (1/2)	Carter Starocci (2/5)	Aaron Brooks (2/4)	Max Dean (1/1)	Gable Steveson (2/2)
2023	Patrick Glory (1/1)	Vito Arujau (1/2)	Andrew Alirez (1/1)	Yianni Diakomihalis (4/4)	Austin O'Connor (2/2)	Keegan O'Toole (2/2)	Carter Starocci (3/5)	Aaron Brooks (3/4)	Nino Bonaccorsi (1/1)	Mason Parris (1/1)
2024	Richard Figueroa (1/1)	Vito Arujau (2/2)	Jesse Mendez (1/2)	Caleb Henson (1/1)	Levi Haines (1/2)	David Carr (2/2)	Carter Starocci (4/5)	Parker Keckeisen (1/1)	Aaron Brooks (4/4)	Greg Kerkvliet (1/1)
2025	Vince Robinson (1/1)	Lucas Byrd (1/1)	Jesse Mendez (2/2)	Ridge Lovett (1/1)	Antrell Taylor (1/1)	Mitchell Mesenbrink (1/2)	Dean Hamiti Jr. (1/1)	Carter Starocci (5/5)	Stephen Buchanan II (1/1)	Wyatt Hendrickson (1/1)
2026	Luke Lilledahl (1/1)	Jax Forrest (1/1)	Sergio Vega (1/1)	Aden Valencia (1/1)	Landon Robideau (1/1)	Mitchell Mesenbrink (2/2)	Levi Haines (2/2)	Max McEnelly (1/1)	Josh Barr (1/1)	Isaac Trumble (1/1)

== Champions ==
=== Team titles ===
National Championships by school: 34, 24, 14, 8, 7, 3, 1

School	#	Year(s) won
Oklahoma State	34	1928, 1929, 1930, 1931, 1933, 1934, 1935, 1937, 1938, 1939, 1940, 1941, 1942, 1946, 1948, 1949, 1954, 1955, 1956, 1958, 1959, 1961, 1962, 1964, 1966, 1968, 1971, 1989, 1990, 1994, 2003, 2004, 2005, 2006
Iowa	24	1975, 1976, 1978, 1979, 1980, 1981, 1982, 1983, 1984, 1985, 1986, 1991, 1992, 1993, 1995, 1996, 1997, 1998, 1999, 2000, 2008, 2009, 2010, 2021
Penn State	14	1953, 2011, 2012, 2013, 2014, 2016, 2017, 2018, 2019, 2022, 2023, 2024, 2025, 2026
Iowa State	8	1933, 1965, 1969, 1970, 1972, 1973, 1977, 1987
Oklahoma	7	1936, 1951, 1952, 1957, 1960, 1963, 1974
Minnesota	3	2001, 2002, 2007
Arizona State	1	1988
Cornell (IA)	1	1947
Indiana	1	1932
Michigan State	1	1967
Northern Iowa	1	1950
Ohio State	1	2015

=== Winning streaks ===
School	Team titles	Years
Iowa	9	1978–1986
Oklahoma State	7	1937–1942, 1946^{#}
Iowa	6	1995–2000
Penn State	5	2022–2026
Oklahoma State	4	1928–1931; 2003–2006
Penn State	4	2011–2014; 2016–2019
Oklahoma State	3	1933–1935; 1954–1956
Iowa	3	1991–1993; 2008–2010

^{#}: No championship was held from 1943–45 due to WWII.

=== Five-time individual champion ===
Sources

- Carter Starocci (Penn State), 2021−2025^{#}

^{#}: NCAA granted extra season of eligibility to student-athletes affected by the shortened 2020-21 season due to COVID-19 pandemic.

=== Four-time individual champions ===
Sources

- Pat Smith (Oklahoma State), 1990–1992, 1994
- Cael Sanderson (Iowa State), 1999–2002
- Kyle Dake (Cornell), 2010–2013
- Logan Stieber (Ohio State), 2012−2015
- Yianni Diakomihalis (Cornell), 2018−2019, 2022–2023
- Aaron Brooks (Penn State), 2021−2024

== See also ==
- Pre-NCAA Wrestling Champion
- NCAA Division II Wrestling Championships (since 1963)
- NCAA Division III Wrestling Championships (since 1974)
- NAIA national wrestling championship (since 1958)
- U Sports (Canada)
- Intercollegiate women's wrestling champions
- List of NCAA Division I wrestling programs
