= 1949 NCAA Wrestling Championships =

American collegiate wrestling tournament

Tournament information
- Sport: College wrestling
- Location: Fort Collins, Colorado
- Dates: March 1949–March 1949
- Host(s): Colorado A&M
- Venue(s): South College Gymnasium

Final positions
- Champions: Oklahoma A&M (16th title)
- 1st runners-up: Iowa State Teachers College
- 2nd runners-up: Cornell College
- MVP: Charles Hetrick (Oklahoma A&M)

The 1949 NCAA Wrestling Championships were the 19th NCAA Wrestling Championships to be held. Colorado A&M in Fort Collins, Colorado hosted the tournament at their South College Gymnasium.

Oklahoma A&M took home the team championship with 32 points and having two individual champions.

Charles Hetrick of Oklahoma A&M was named the Outstanding Wrestler.

== Team results ==
Rank	School	Points
1	Oklahoma A&M	32
2	Iowa State Teachers College	27
3	Cornell College	21
4	Michigan State	13
5	Minnesota	11
6	Purdue	9
T-7	Nebraska	5
T-7	Iowa	5
9	Syracuse	4
T-10	Illinois	3
T-10	Colorado A&M	3

== Individual finals ==
Weight class	Championship match (champion in boldface)
121 lbs	**Arnold Plaza**, Purdue DEC Grady Peninger, Oklahoma A&M, 3–1
128 lbs	**Charles Hetrick**, Oklahoma A&M DEC Leo Thomsen, Cornell College, 4–1
136 lbs	**Lowell Lange**, Cornell College DEC Dick Dickenson, Michigan State, 6–0
145 lbs	**Keith Young**, Iowa State Teachers College DEC Don Anderson, Michigan State, 3–0
155 lbs	**Bill Nelson**, Iowa State Teachers College DEC Ken Hunte, Syracuse, 3–0
165 lbs	**Bill Smith**, Iowa State Teachers College DEC Melbourne Flesner, Oklahoma A&M, 6–1
175 lbs	**Jim Gregerson**, Oklahoma A&M DEC Joe Scarpello, Iowa, 3–1
UNL	**Verne Gagne**, Minnesota RD Dick Hutton, Oklahoma A&M, 1–1
