= 1932 NCAA Wrestling Championships =

American collegiate wrestling tournament

Tournament information
- Sport: College wrestling
- Location: Bloomington, Indiana
- Dates: March 1932–March 1932
- Host: Indiana University
- Venue: IU Fieldhouse

Final positions
- Champions: Unofficial; Indiana (1st title)
- 1st runners-up: Oklahoma A&M
- 2nd runners-up: Iowa Agricultural College

The 1932 NCAA Wrestling Championships were the 5th NCAA Wrestling Championships to be held. Indiana University in Bloomington, Indiana hosted the tournament at IU Fieldhouse.

Indiana took home the team championship with 14 points with one individual champion.

Edwin Belshaw of Indiana was named the Outstanding Wrestler.

== Team results ==
Rank	School	Points
1	Indiana	14
2	Oklahoma A&M	11
3	Iowa Agricultural College	10
4	Northwestern	9
T-5	Oklahoma	8
T-5	Ohio	8
7	Michigan	7
T-8	Illinois	6
T-8	Navy	6
T-8	Southwestern Oklahoma	6

== Individual finals ==
Weight class	Championship match (champion in boldface)
123 lbs	**Joe Puerta**, Illinois WBF Bobby Pearce, Oklahoma A&M, 9:06
134 lbs	**Edwin Belshaw**, Indiana TA Ralph Rasor, Oklahoma A&M
145 lbs	**Hardie Lewis**, Oklahoma TA Dale Goings, Indiana
158 lbs	**Carl Dougovito**, Michigan TA Max Silverstein, Navy
174 lbs	**Robert Hess**, Iowa Agricultural College TA Leroy McGuirk, Oklahoma A&M
191 lbs	**Kermit Blosser**, Ohio WVF Ralph Teague, Southwestern Oklahoma, 7:56
UNL	**Jack Riley**, Northwestern TA Peter Mehringer, Kansas
