= 1950 NCAA wrestling championships =

American collegiate wrestling tournament

1950 NCAA Wrestling Championships
Tournament information
- Sport: College wrestling
- Location: Cedar Falls, Iowa
- Dates: March 24, 1950–March 25, 1950
- Host(s): Iowa State Teachers College
- Venue(s): West Gymnasium

Final positions
- Champions: Iowa State Teachers College (1st title)
- 1st runners-up: Purdue University
- 2nd runners-up: Cornell College
- MVP: Tony Gizoni (Waynesburg)

The 1950 NCAA Wrestling Championships were the 20th NCAA Wrestling Championships to be held. Iowa State Teachers College in Cedar Falls, Iowa hosted the tournament at their West Gymnasium.

Iowa State Teachers College took home the team championship with 30 points and having three individual champions.

Tony Gizoni of Waynesburg was named the Outstanding Wrestler.

== Team results ==
| Rank | School | Points |
|---|---|---|
| 1 | Iowa State Teachers College | 30 |
| 2 | Purdue | 16 |
| 3 | Cornell College | 14 |
| T-4 | Syracuse | 10 |
| T-4 | Oklahoma A&M | 10 |
| 6 | Iowa | 7 |
| T-7 | Waynesburg | 6 |
| T-7 | Ithaca | 6 |
| 9 | Penn State | 5 |
| T-10 | Oklahoma | 3 |
| T-10 | Navy | 3 |
| T-10 | Illinois | 3 |

== Individual finals ==
| Weight class | Championship match (champion in boldface) |
|---|---|
| 121 lbs | **Tony Gizoni**, Waynesburg DEC Arnold Plaza, Purdue, 7–6 |
| 128 lbs | **Joe Patacsill**, Purdue DEC Walter Romanowski, Cornell College, 3–2 |
| 136 lbs | **Lowell Lange**, Cornell College RD Floyd Oglesby, Iowa State Teachers College, 2–2 |
| 145 lbs | **Keith Young**, Iowa State Teachers College DEC Charles Moreno, Purdue, 5–2 |
| 155 lbs | **Bill Nelson**, Iowa State Teachers College DEC Ken Hunte, Syracuse, 8–1 |
| 165 lbs | **Bill Smith**, Iowa State Teachers College DEC James LaRock, Ithaca, 10–7 |
| 175 lbs | **Joe Scarpello**, Iowa MAJOR George Gebhardt, Syracuse, 13–4 |
| UNL | **Dick Hutton**, Oklahoma A&M RD Fred Stoeker, Iowa State Teachers College, 1–1 |
