= 1978 NCAA Division I Wrestling Championships =

American collegiate wrestling tournament

Tournament information
- Sport: College wrestling
- Location: College Park, Maryland
- Dates: March 16, 1978–March 18, 1978
- Host(s): University of Maryland
- Venue(s): Cole Field House

Final positions
- Champions: Iowa (3rd title)
- 1st runners-up: Iowa State
- 2nd runners-up: Oklahoma State

Tournament statistics
- Attendance: 43,759
- MVP: Mark Churella (Michigan)

The 1978 NCAA Division I Wrestling Championships were the 48th NCAA Division I Wrestling Championships to be held. The University of Maryland in College Park, Maryland hosted the tournament at the Cole Field House.

Iowa took home the team championship with 94.5 points despite having no individual champions.

Mark Churella of Michigan was named the Most Outstanding Wrestler and Scott Heaton of Cal Poly-SLO received the Gorriaran Award.

== Team results ==
Rank	School	Points
1	Iowa	94.5
2	Iowa State	94
3	Oklahoma State	86.25
4	Wisconsin	77.25
5	Lehigh	52.25
6	Cal Poly	41.5
7	Minnesota	37.5
8	Michigan	33.25
9	Oklahoma	32.5
10	Penn State	29.25

== Individual finals ==
Weight class	Championship match (champion in boldface)
118 lbs	**Andy Daniels**, Ohio WBF John Azevedo, Cal State- Bakersfield, 0:30
126 lbs	**Mike Land**, Iowa State MAJOR Randy Lewis, Iowa, 13–5
134 lbs	**Ken Mallory**, Montclair State DEC Frank DeAngelis, Oklahoma, 10–7
142 lbs	**Dan Hicks**, Oregon State DEC Andy Rein, Wisconsin, 8–8, 3–1
150 lbs	**Mark Churella**, Michigan WBF Bruce Kinseth, Iowa, 3:09
158 lbs	**Lee Kemp**, Wisconsin DEC Kelly Ward, Iowa State, 10–8
167 lbs	**Keith Stearns**, Oklahoma DEC Paul Martin, Oklahoma State, 3–2
177 lbs	**Mark Lieberman**, Lehigh DEC Eric Wais, Oklahoma State, 7–1
190 lbs	**Ron Jeidy**, Wisconsin WDF Frank Santana, Iowa State, 3:38
UNL	**Jimmy Jackson**, Oklahoma State WBF John Sefter, Princeton, 1:12
