= 1952 NCAA wrestling championships =

American collegiate wrestling tournament

1952 NCAA Wrestling Championships
Tournament information
- Sport: College wrestling
- Location: Fort Collins, Colorado
- Dates: March 28, 1952–March 29, 1952
- Host(s): Colorado A&M
- Venue(s): South College Gymnasium

Final positions
- Champions: Oklahoma (3rd title)
- 1st runners-up: Iowa State Teachers College
- 2nd runners-up: Oklahoma A&M
- MVP: Tommy Evans (Oklahoma)

The 1952 NCAA Wrestling Championships were the 22nd NCAA Wrestling Championships to be held. Colorado A&M in Fort Collins, Colorado hosted the tournament at their South College Gymnasium.

Oklahoma took home the team championship with 22 points and having two individual champions.

Tommy Evans of Oklahoma was named the Most Outstanding Wrestler.

== Team results ==
Rank	School	Points
1	Oklahoma	22
2	Iowa State Teachers College	21
3	Oklahoma A&M	20
4	Toledo	10
5	Penn State	8
T-6	Waynesburg	7
T-6	Illinois	7
T-6	Colorado	7
T-9	Pittsburgh	6
T-9	Indiana	6
T-9	California	6

== Individual finals ==
Weight class	Championship match (champion in boldface)
115 lbs	**Hugh Peery**, Pittsburgh DEC Will Howard Denver, 13–6
123 lbs	**Bill Borders**, Oklahoma MAJOR Harry Arthur, Indiana, 15–6
130 lbs	**Gene Lybbert**, Iowa State Teachers College DEC Donald Reece, Oklahoma, 8–1
137 lbs	**George Layman**, Oklahoma A&M DEC Bob Morris, Iowa State Teachers College, 6–4
147 lbs	**Tommy Evans**, Oklahoma MAJOR Jim Harmon, Iowa State Teachers College 16–2
157 lbs	**Bill Weick**, Iowa State Teachers College DEC Tom Titsworth, Oklahoma A&M, 6–0
167 lbs	**Joe Lemyre**, Penn State DEC George Bender, Michigan State, 6–0
177 lbs	**Bentley Lyon**, California SRD Maynard Skinner, Colorado, 3–3
191 lbs	**Harry Lanzi**, Toledo DEC George Myers, Iowa, 7–5
UNL	**Gene Nicks**, Oklahoma A&M WBF John Witte, Oregon State, 4:19
