= North Carolina Tar Heels =

Intercollegiate sports teams of the University of North Carolina at Chapel Hill

- University: University of North Carolina at Chapel Hill
- Nickname: Tar Heels
- NCAA: Division I (FBS)
- Conference: Atlantic Coast Conference
- Athletic director: Steve Newmark
- Location: Chapel Hill, North Carolina
- Varsity teams: 28
- Football stadium: Kenan Memorial Stadium
- Basketball arena: Dean E. Smith Student Activities Center (men); William Donald Carmichael Jr. Arena (women)
- Baseball stadium: Bryson Field at Boshamer Stadium
- Soccer stadium: Dorrance Field
- Colors: Carolina blue and white
- Mascot: Rameses
- Fight song: I'm a Tar Heel Born; Here Comes Carolina
- Website: goheels.com

Atlantic Coast Conference logo in North Carolina's colors

The North Carolina Tar Heels (also Carolina Tar Heels) are the intercollegiate athletic teams that represent the University of North Carolina at Chapel Hill. The name Tar Heel is a nickname used to refer to individuals from the state of North Carolina, the Tar Heel State. The campus at Chapel Hill is referred to as the University of North Carolina for the purposes of the National Collegiate Athletic Association. Since the school fostered the oldest collegiate team in the Carolinas, the school took on the nickname Carolina, especially in athletics. The Tar Heels are also referred to as UNC or The Heels.

The mascot of the Tar Heels is Rameses, a Dorset Ram. It is represented as either a live Dorset sheep with its horns painted Carolina Blue, or as a costumed character performed by a volunteer from the student body, usually an undergraduate student associated with the cheerleading team.

Carolina has won 52 NCAA Division I team national championships in eight different sports, seventh all-time, and 52 individual national championships.

== Sports sponsored ==
Men's sports	Women's sports
Baseball	Basketball
Basketball	Cross country
Cross country	Fencing
Fencing	Field hockey
Football	Golf
Golf	Gymnastics
Lacrosse	Lacrosse
Soccer	Rowing
Swimming & diving	Soccer
Tennis	Softball
Track and field^{1}	Swimming & diving
Wrestling	Tennis
	Track and field^{1}
	Volleyball
^{1} – includes both indoor and outdoor.

=== Baseball ===
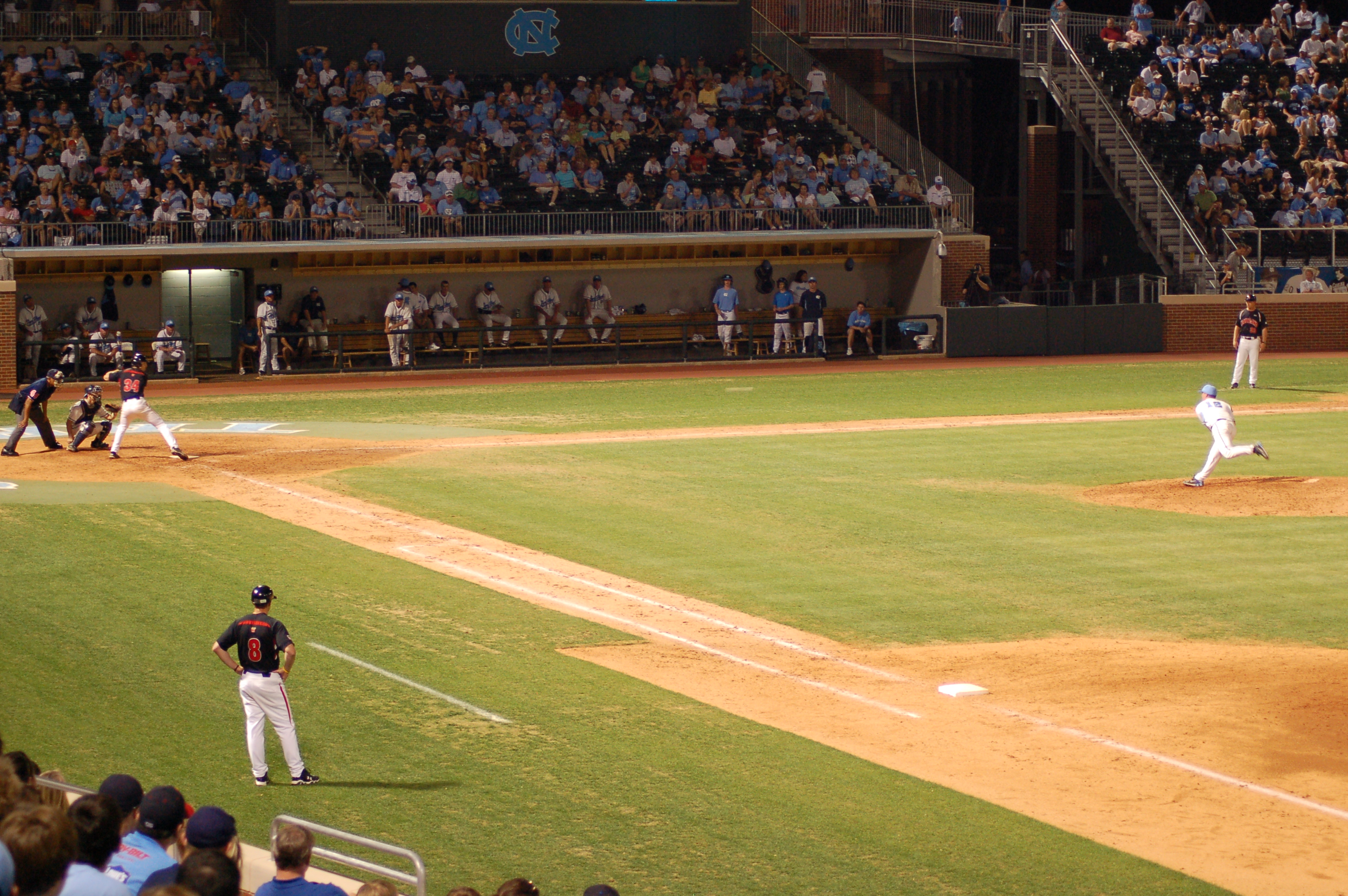
Boshamer Stadium, the home of Tar Heel baseball

- Head coach: Scott Forbes
- Stadium: Bryson Field at Boshamer Stadium
- ACC Championships: 9 (1982, 1983, 1984, 1990, 2007, 2013, 2018, 2019, 2022)
- College World Series appearances: 13 (1960, 1966, 1978, 1988, 2006, 2007, 2008, 2009, 2011, 2013, 2018, 2024, 2026)

Also nicknamed the Diamond Heels, Carolina's baseball team has appeared in the College World Series eleven times. They have reached the championship series three times. They lost both the (2006 and 2007) CWS to Oregon State. In 2026, the Tar Heels lost the finals to the Oklahoma Sooners.

=== Men's basketball ===
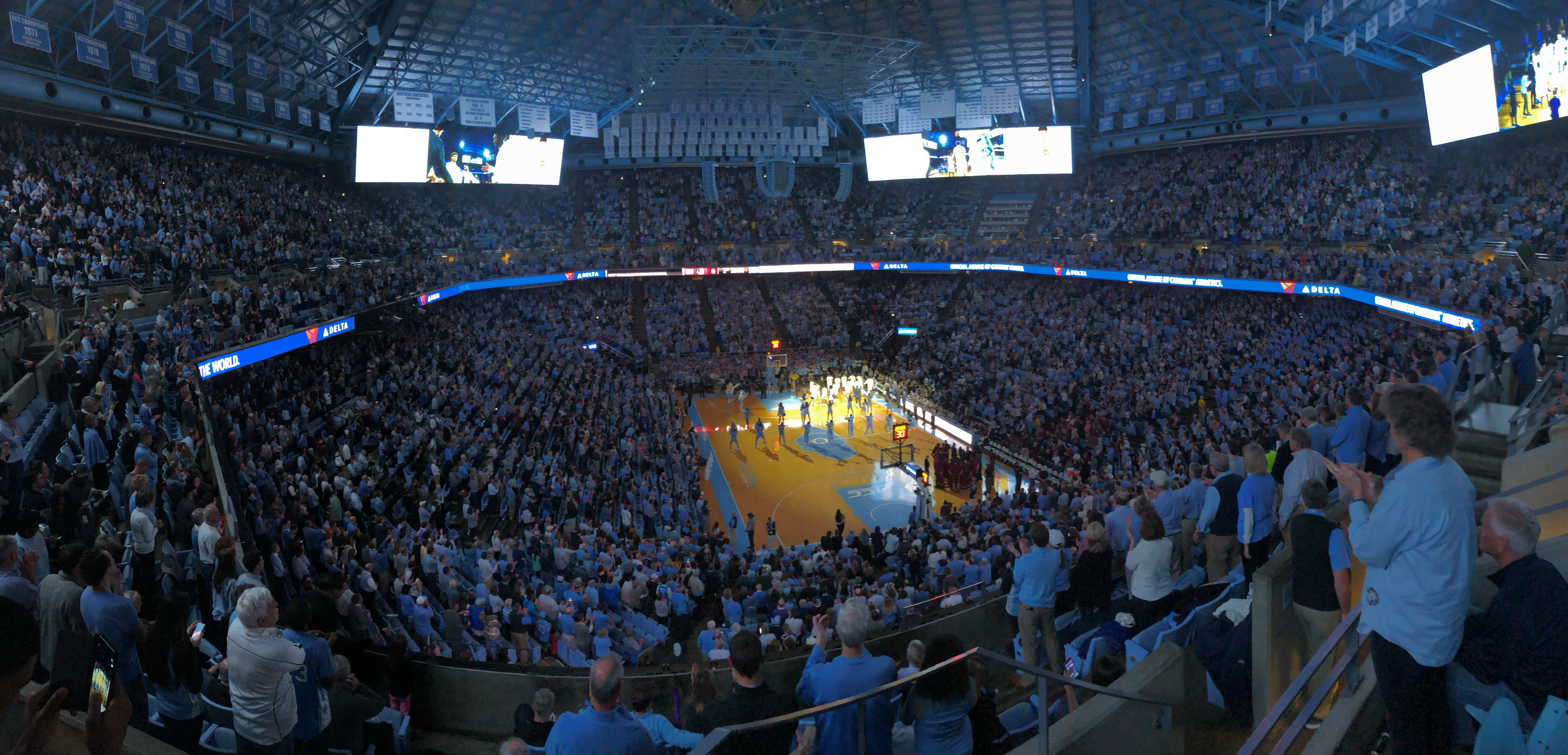
The Dean E. Smith Center, home of the Tar Heels since 1986

- Head coach: Michael Malone
- Arena: Dean E. Smith Center
- Southern Conference Championships: 13 (tournament: 1922, 1924 [undefeated], 1925, 1926, 1935, 1936, 1940, 1945; regular season: 1935, 1938, 1941, 1944, 1946)
- ACC regular season championships: 32 (1956, 1957, 1959, 1960, 1961, 1967, 1968, 1969, 1971, 1972, 1976, 1977, 1978, 1979, 1982, 1983, 1984, 1985, 1987, 1988, 1993, 1995, 2001, 2005, 2007, 2008, 2009, 2011, 2012, 2016, 2017, 2019, 2024)
- ACC Tournament Championships: 18 (1957, 1967, 1968, 1969, 1972, 1975, 1977, 1979, 1981, 1982, 1989, 1991, 1994, 1997, 1998, 2007, 2008, 2016)
- NCAA National Championships: 6 (1957, 1982, 1993, 2005, 2009, 2017)
- Pre-Tournament Claimed National Championships: 1 (1924)
- Postseason Invitational Championships: 1 (1971)
- NCAA Final Four appearances: 21 (1946, 1957, 1967, 1968, 1969, 1972, 1977, 1981, 1982, 1991, 1993, 1995, 1997, 1998, 2000, 2005, 2008, 2009, 2016, 2017, 2022)
- Best final ranking: No. 1 (Associated Press: 1957, 1982, 1984, 1994, 1998, 2008, 2009; Coaches: 1957, 1982, 1984, 1993, 2005, 2009, 2017)
- National Players of the Year: 8 (Jack Cobb 1923–26, George Glamack 1938–41, Lennie Rosenbluth 1954–57, Phil Ford 1974–78, James Worthy 1979–82, Michael Jordan 1981–1984, Antawn Jamison 1995–98, Tyler Hansbrough 2005–09).

Carolina has enjoyed long success as one of the top college basketball programs in the country. The program claims 7 national championship teams, six NCAA National Championships and one retroactive championship, for the 1924. This championship was awarded by the Helms Foundation and the Premo-Porretta Power Poll.

Under coach Frank McGuire, the Tar Heels won one national championship in 1957. The 1956-57 team went undefeated on their way to the school's first NCAA tournament championship. McGuire was succeeded by Dean Smith. After struggling early in his tenure, Smith entrenched the Tar Heels as a basketball powerhouse over his 36 years as head coach. At the time of his retirement, Smith's 879 wins set the record for the most wins of any men's college basketball head coach. Under Smith, the Tar Heels won two national championships, 13 ACC Tournament championships, and one NIT Championship. Smith is also credited with popularizing the four corners, which he employed until the introduction of the shot clock in college basketball. Smith is also credited with developing "The Carolina Way," epitomized by his motto of "Play hard, play smart, play together," and by other team-oriented practices including "point to the passer," where the player who scores a basket thanks his teammate for the assist.

In 2003, Roy Williams, an assistant under Smith from 1978 to 1988 and the head coach of Kansas, returned to his alma mater. In Williams' second season as head coach, the Tar Heels won the 2005 NCAA national championship. Williams would go on to win two more national titles (2009 and 2017) in his 18 seasons as Tar Heel head coach. Williams passed his mentor Smith's 879 win total, finishing his career with 903 wins, 485 of which came in Chapel Hill.

Williams retired on April 1, 2021, and was replaced by assistant coach Hubert Davis. Davis, who played for Tar Heels from 1988 to 1992 under Smith, also had a lengthy career as an NBA player, and spent several seasons as an analyst for ESPN before being hired by Williams as an assistant coach in 2012. He became the first African American head coach for UNC men's basketball, and led the team to its NCAA-record 21st final four in the 2021-22 season.

==== JV Basketball ====
North Carolina was one of the few remaining Division I schools to sponsor a junior varsity basketball team. The JV Tar Heels played games against community colleges and preparatory schools. The final season of Carolina JV basketball was 2024-25.

=== Women's basketball ===
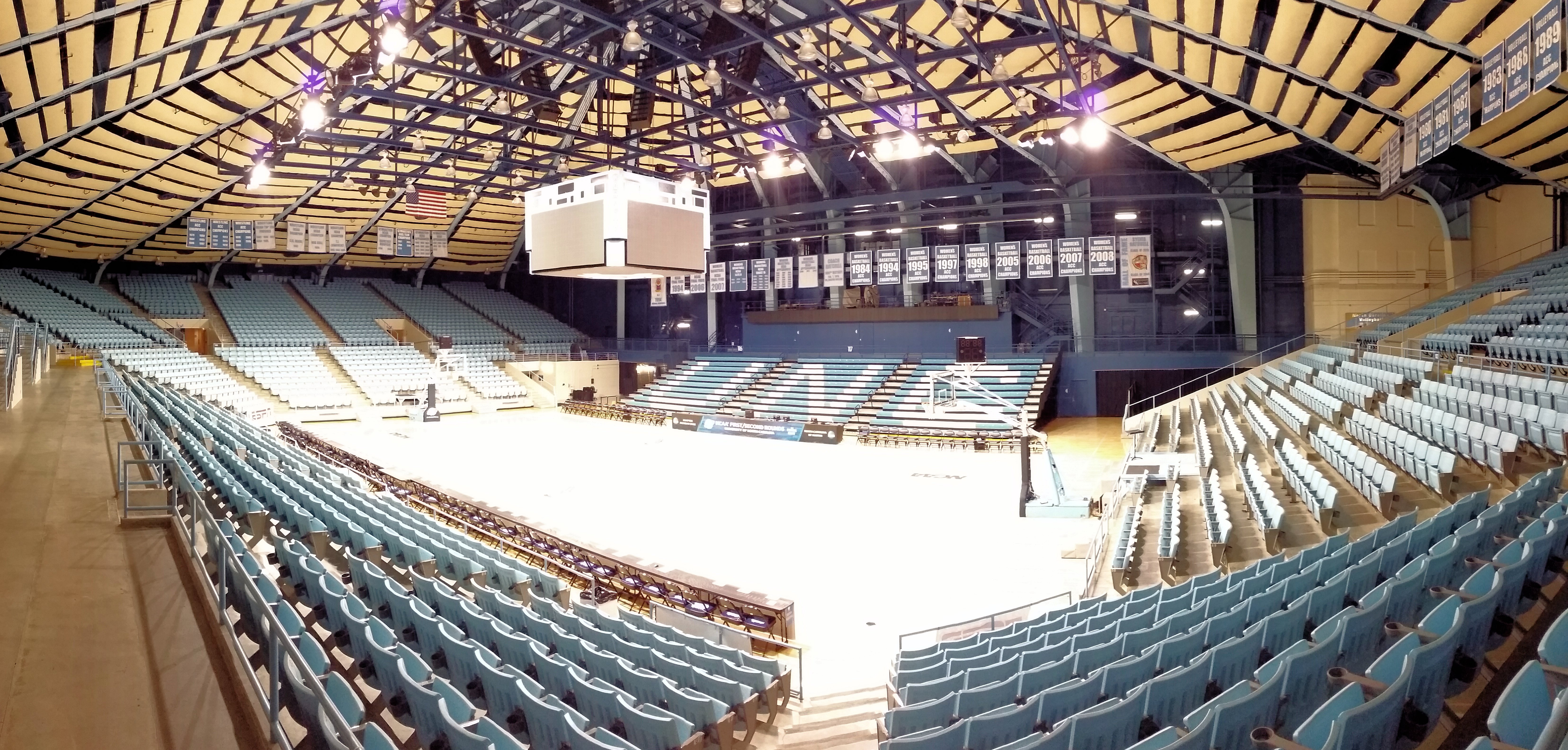
Carmichael Arena, the home of UNC women's basketball and several Olympic sports

- Head coach: Courtney Banghart
- Arena: Carmichael Arena
- ACC regular season championships: 4 (1997, 2005, 2006, 2008)
- ACC Tournament Championships: 9 (1984, 1994, 1995, 1997, 1998, 2005, 2006, 2007, 2008)
- Final Four appearances: 3 (1994, 2006, 2007)
- National Championships: 1 (1994)

Under legendary coach Sylvia Hatchell, North Carolina women's basketball had many successful seasons. Perhaps the most successful season came in 1993–94, when Hatchell's Tar Heels won the NCAA national championship. Following several seasons of downturn, Hatchell resigned after the 2018–19 season.

Coach Hatchell was replaced by Courtney Banghart, who immediately began to rebuild the program. In her four seasons as head coach, Banghart has begun to raise the standards of the program back to the national level by recruiting at a high level and making back-to-back NCAA Tournament appearances in 2021 and 2022. The 2022 team reached the NCAA tournament round of sixteen for the first time since 2015, where the Tar Heels gave eventual national champion South Carolina their closest game of the tournament.

=== Field hockey ===
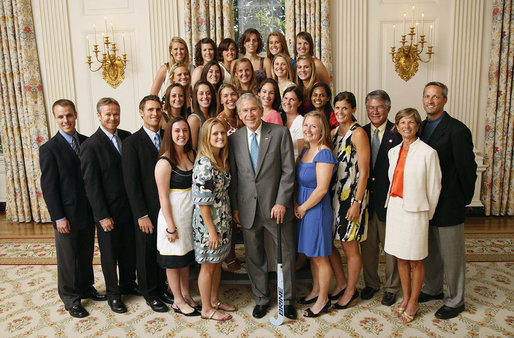
2007 field hockey team with President George W. Bush

- Head coach: Erin Matson
- Stadium: Karen Shelton Stadium
- ACC Championships: 26 (1983, 1984, 1985, 1986, 1987, 1988, 1989, 1990, 1991, 1993, 1994, 1995, 1996, 1997, 2004, 2007, 2011, 2012, 2015, 2017, 2018, 2019, 2020, 2021, 2022, 2023)
- National Championships: 11 (1989, 1995, 1996, 1997, 2007, 2009, 2018, 2019, 2020, 2022, 2023)

Karen Shelton led the Carolina field hockey program for 42 years prior to her retirement following the 2022 season. She won 10 NCAA national championships and 25 ACC titles, both records for the sport. Shelton was replaced by former star player Erin Matson, who herself was a member of four of UNC's national championship teams (2018–2020, 2022), and is the only athlete to win the ACC's player of the year award five times. In Matson's first season in 2023, she led the Tar Heels to their 11th national title, becoming the youngest head coach ever to win a Division I national title in any sport (at age 23).

=== Football ===
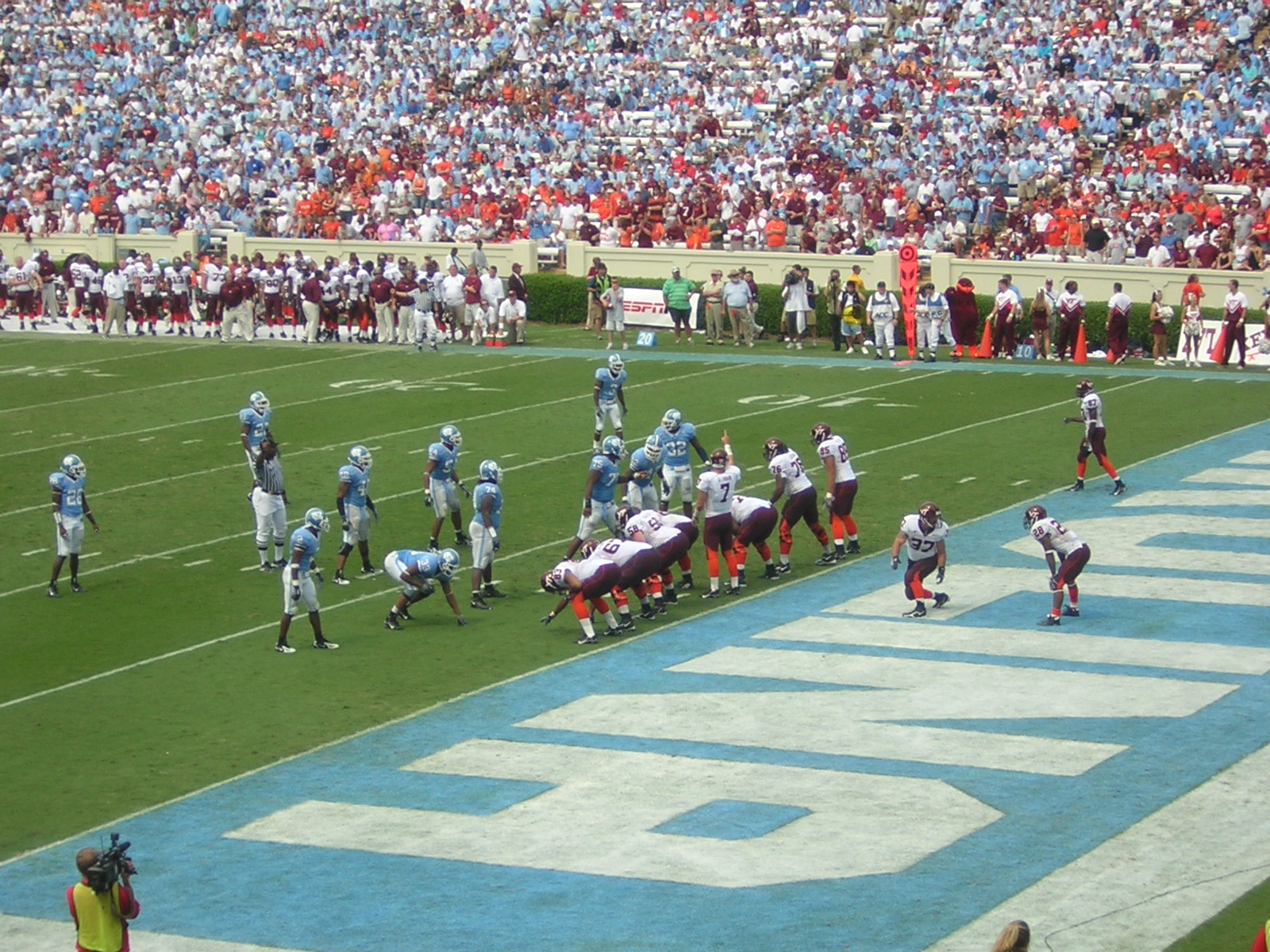
2006 football team playing Virginia Tech

- Head coach: Bill Belichick
- Stadium: Kenan Memorial Stadium
- Southern Intercollegiate Athletic Association Championships: 1 (1895)
- Southern Conference Championships: 4 (1922, 1934, 1946, 1949)
- ACC Championships: 5 (1963, 1971, 1972, 1977, 1980)
- ACC Coastal Division Championships: 3 (2012, 2015, 2022)
- Postseason Bowl appearances: 37 (1947 Sugar, 1949 Sugar, 1950 Cotton, 1963 Gator, 1970 Peach, 1971 Gator, 1972 Sun, 1974 Sun, 1976 Peach, 1977 Liberty, 1979 Gator, 1980 Bluebonnet, 1981 Gator, 1982 Sun, 1983 Peach, 1986 Aloha, 1993 Peach, 1993 Gator, 1994 Sun, 1995 Carquest, 1997 Gator, 1998 Gator, 1998 Las Vegas, 2001 Peach, 2004 Continental Tire, 2008 Meineke Car Care, 2009 Meineke Car Care, 2010 Music City, 2011 Independence, 2013 Belk, 2014 Quick Lane, 2015 Russell Athletic, 2016 Sun, 2019 Military, 2021 Orange Bowl – January, 2021 Duke's Mayo Bowl, 2022 Holiday Bowl)
- Best final ranking: No. 3 (1948 Associated Press)

=== Men's lacrosse ===
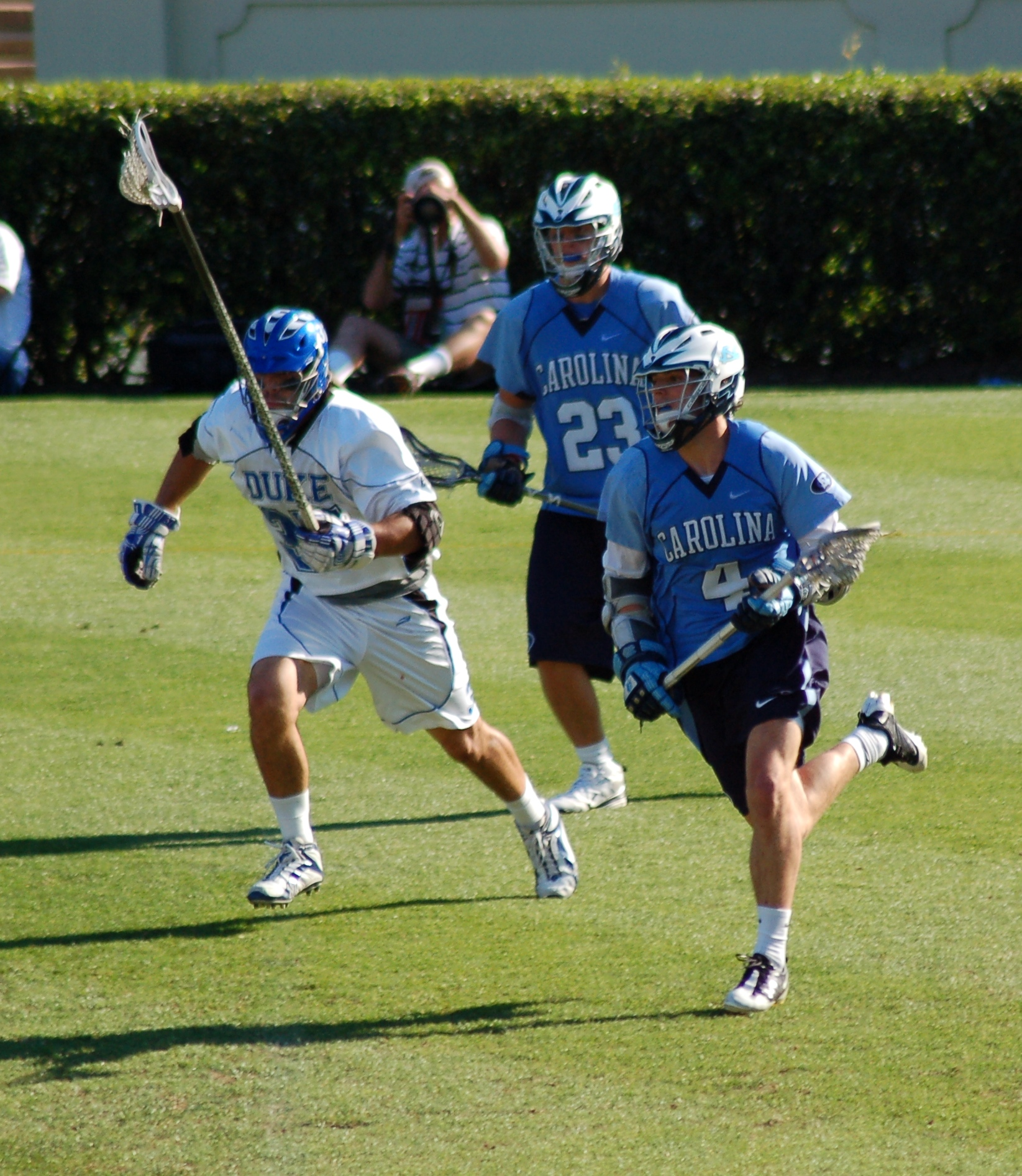
Men's lacrosse in the 2009 ACC tournament final

- Head coach: Joe Breschi
- Home fields: Dorrance Field
- ACC Tournament Championships: 1989, 1990, 1991, 1992, 1993, 1994, 1996, 2013, 2017
- ACC regular season championships: 1981, 1982, 1985, 1988, 1991, 1992, 1994, 1996, 2016, 2021
- NCAA tournament appearances: 1976, 1977, 1980, 1981, 1982, 1983, 1984, 1985, 1986, 1987, 1988, 1989, 1990, 1991, 1992, 1993, 1994, 1995, 1996, 1998, 2004, 2007, 2008, 2009, 2010, 2011, 2012, 2013, 2014, 2015, 2016, 2017, 2021
- NCAA tournament Final Four appearances: 14 (1980, 1981, 1982, 1983, 1984, 1985, 1986, 1989, 1990, 1991, 1992, 1993, 2016, 2021)
- NCAA Tournament Championships: 5 (1981, 1982, 1986, 1991, 2016)

=== Women's lacrosse ===
- Head coach: Jenny Levy
- Home fields: Dorrance Field
- ACC Tournament Championships: 2002, 2016, 2017, 2018, 2019, 2021, 2022
- NCAA Tournament appearances: 1997, 1998, 1999, 2000, 2001, 2002, 2005, 2006, 2007, 2008, 2009, 2010, 2011, 2012, 2013, 2014, 2015, 2016, 2017, 2018, 2019, 2021, 2022
- NCAA Tournament Final Four appearances: 13 (1997, 1998, 2002, 2009, 2010, 2011, 2013, 2015, 2016, 2018, 2019, 2021, 2022)
- NCAA Championships: 4 (2013, 2016, 2022, 2025)

=== Men's soccer ===
- Head coach: Carlos Somoano
- Stadium: Dorrance Field
- ACC Tournament championships: 1987, 2000, 2011
- College Cup appearances: 1987, 2001, 2008, 2009, 2010, 2011, 2016, 2017, 2021 (spring)
- NCAA National Championships: 2 (2001, 2011)

=== Women's soccer ===
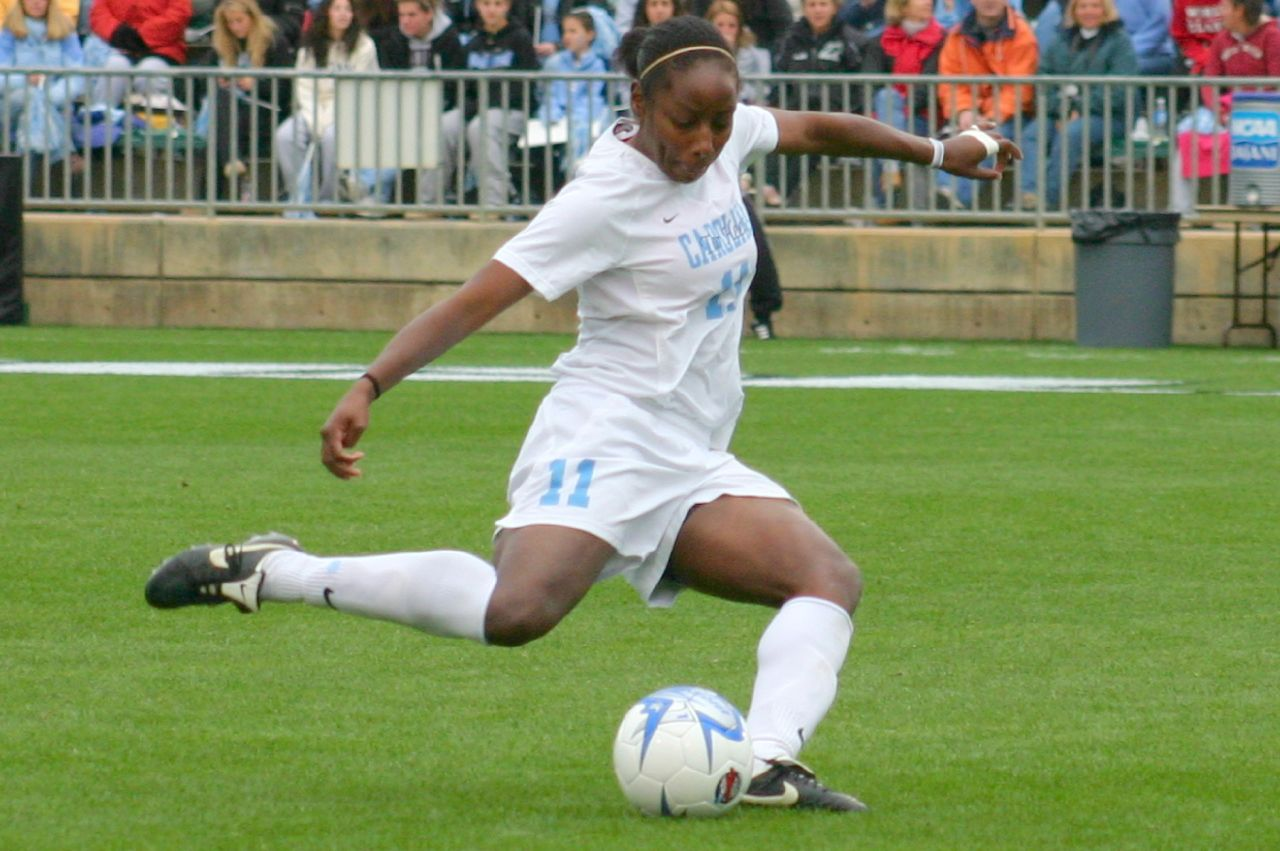
2006 women's soccer player Robyn Gayle

- Head coach: Damon Nahas
- Stadium: Dorrance Field
- ACC Championships: 38 (1989, 1990, 1991, 1992, 1993, 1994, 1995, 1996, 1997, 1998, 1999, 2000, 2001, 2002, 2003, 2005, 2006, 2007, 2008, 2009 Tournament, 1987, 1989, 1990, 1991, 1992, 1993, 1995, 1996, 1997, 1998, 1999, 2001, 2002, 2003, 2004, 2005, 2006, 2007, 2008, 2010 regular season)
- National Championships: 23 (1981 AIAW, 1982, 1983, 1984, 1986, 1987, 1988, 1989, 1990, 1991, 1992, 1993, 1994, 1996, 1997, 1999, 2000, 2003, 2006, 2008, 2009, 2012, 2024 NCAA)
- College Cup appearances: 26 (1982, 1983, 1984, 1985, 1986, 1987, 1988, 1989, 1990, 1991, 1992, 1993, 1994, 1995, 1996, 1997, 1998, 1999, 2000, 2001, 2002, 2003, 2006, 2008, 2009, 2012, 2013, 2014, 2015, 2016, 2017, 2018, 2019, 2020, 2021 (spring), 2022, 2024)

Anson Dorrance coached the women's soccer team at Carolina from its inception in 1979 until 2024. In his 46 years as head coach, Dorrance won 38 ACC championships and 22 national championships on the way to over 1,000 victories as a head coach. In 2019, following the demolition of Fetzer Field, a new combination soccer and lacrosse stadium was opened on the same site, named Dorrance Field in his honor. Damon Nahas replaced Anson Dorrance as interim head coach prior to the 2024 season and was promoted to head coach on December 9, 2024.

=== Women's tennis ===
- Head coach: Brian Kalbas
- Stadium: Chewning Tennis Center
- NCAA National Championships: 1 (2023)
- ITA Indoor National Championships: 7 (2013, 2015, 2018, 2020, 2021, 2022, 2023)

Jamie Loeb attended UNC for her freshman and sophomore years (2013–15), during which she became the first freshman in close to 30 years to win both the Riviera/ITA Women's All-American Championship (making her the NCAA Women's Singles Tennis National Champion) and the USTA/ITA National Indoor Intercollegiate Championship. She was also the first singles national champion in UNC women's tennis history. In both her freshman and her sophomore seasons she was named Atlantic Coast Conference (ACC) Player of the Year.

In 2023, Fiona Crawley was named the Honda Sport Award winner for tennis. In 2025, Reese Brantmeier won the NCAA Division I individual championship, held in the fall of the 2025–2026 year.

=== Men's golf ===
The men's golf team has won 15 conference championships:

- Southern Conference (3): 1947, 1952, 1953
- Atlantic Coast Conference (11): 1956, 1960, 1965, 1977, 1981, 1983–84, 1986, 1995–96, 2006 (co-champion), 2024

Two Tar Heels have won the NCAA individual championship, Harvie Ward in 1949 and John Inman in 1984. Ward also won the British Amateur in 1952 and the U.S. Amateur in 1955 and 1956. The team's best finish was second place in 1953 and 1991.

Tar Heel golfers who have had success at the professional level include Davis Love III (20 PGA Tour wins including 1997 PGA Championship) and Mark Wilson (five PGA Tour wins).

=== Wrestling ===
Following Coach Sam Barnes, who built the modern wrestling program at UNC (1953–1971), head coach Bill Lam led the Tar Heel wrestling program for 30 years until his retirement in 2002, where his former wrestler and 1982 NCAA Champion, C.D. Mock, became his replacement. Under Lam, the Tar Heels were a consistent top 25 NCAA team. Lam led the Tar Heels to 15 ACC tournament titles in addition to being named ACC coach of the year 10 times. Following the Lam era, Mock was named ACC Coach of the Year in 2005 and 2006 in addition to claiming two ACC team titles. In 2015, Olympic bronze medalist and Oklahoma State University graduate Coleman Scott became the team's head wrestling coach.

The Tar Heel wrestling program boasts many ACC champions, All-Americans, and has 4 individual NCAA champions, with 7 national championships amongst them: C.D. Mock (1982), Rob Koll (1988), T.J. Jaworsky (1993, 1994, 1995), and Austin O'Connor (2021, 2023). Jaworsky is known as one of the greatest college wrestlers of all time as he is the first and only ACC wrestler to win three NCAA titles in addition to winning the inaugural Dan Hodge Trophy, given to college wrestling's most dominant wrestler.

UNC wrestling All-Americans include: C.D. Mock, Dave Cook, Jan Michaels, Bob Monaghan, Mike Elinsky, Rob Koll, Bobby Shriner, Tad Wilson, Al Palacio, Lenny Bernstein, Doug Wyland, Enzo Catullo, Pete Welch, Shane Camera, Jody Staylor, Marc Taylor, Stan Banks, Justin Harty, Evan Sola, Chris Rodrigues, Evan Henderson, Ethan Ramos, and Joey Ward.

Other notable alumni include C.C. Fisher, a 1998 ACC champion and Most Outstanding Wrestler, who went on to become a successful wrestler on the international stage, where he was as high as second on the United States Olympic latter. Fisher also went on to become a successful coach for multiple Division I wrestling programs including Iowa State and Stanford. Also, the late Sen. Paul Wellstone attended the University of North Carolina at Chapel Hill (UNC) on a wrestling scholarship. In college he was an undefeated ACC wrestling champion.

The Tar Heel wrestling program has won 17 total ACC championships: 1979, 1980, 1984, 1985, 1986, 1987, 1992, 1993, 1994, 1995, 1997, 1998, 1999, 2000, 2003, 2005 and 2006.

UNC's best finish at the NCAA tournament was 5th in 1982. They also finished 6th at the 1994 NCAA tournament.

Carmichael Arena is currently the home to the Tar Heels Wrestling team, located centrally on campus.

=== Women's rowing ===
Head Coaches - Thomas Revelle, Emilie Gross

Founded 1997/98 season

== Other sports ==
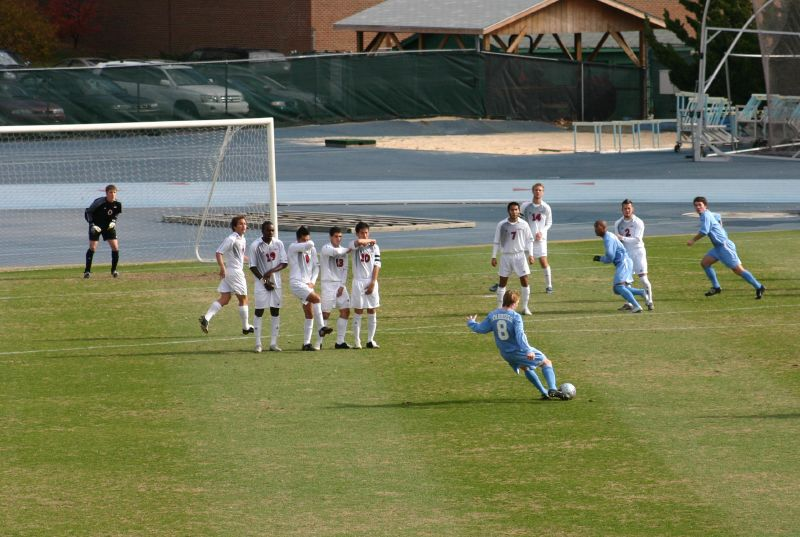
2005 men's soccer team playing SMU

Carolina also fields non-varsity sports teams. Other national championship victories include the women's team handball team in 2004, 2009, 2010, 2011; and the men's handball team in 2004, 2005, and 2006. The men's crew won the 2004 ECAC National Invitational Collegiate Regatta in the varsity eight category. In 1994, Carolina's athletic programs won the Sears Directors Cup which is awarded for cumulative performance in NCAA competition.

=== Rugby ===
North Carolina's Men's rugby team competes in the Atlantic Coast Rugby League against its traditional ACC rivals. North Carolina Men's Rugby finished second in its conference in 2010, led by conference co-player of the year Alex Lee. The North Carolina Men finished second at the Atlantic Coast Invitational in 2009 and again in 2010. North Carolina has also competed in the Collegiate Rugby Championship, finishing 11th in 2011 in a tournament broadcast live on NBC.

The North Carolina Women's Rugby Team is a Division 1 team competing in the Blue Ridge Rugby Conference and has repeatedly competed at the National Level, including a run at the Final Four in 2016. The Most Notable Alumna being Naya Tapper, Current captain and all time leading scorer for U.S. National Rugby Sevens. Other Notable Alumni of UNC Women's Rugby include All-American Emily Pratt (Second team 2003, First team 2006), All-American Kira Cervenka (First team 2004-5), All-American and US 7s National player Katie Lorenz (Second team 2010, 2011), All-American and professional US 15s National player Kimber Rozier (First team 2011), and All-American and US 7s National player Naya Tapper (2015, 2016). Past distinguished players include U20 National team winger Holly Zoeller (2010–11) and U23 South All-Stars Jessica Meidinger (2011) and Carrie Moss (2010-11). Alumni Kimber Rozier and Naya Taper have played on the USA Nationals 15s Team, with Tapper being the All-Time leading scorer for the U.S. Women's Sevens team having competed in the 2020 Tokyo Olympics.

=== Ultimate ===
North Carolina's Ultimate (sport) teams compete nationally in USA Ultimate's college division. The men's team, Darkside, won national championships in 2015, 2018, 2021, 2022, and 2023. The women's team, Pleiades, became the first team to win four consecutive collegiate national championships in 2021, 2022, 2023, and 2024. Individuals on both Darkside and Pleiades have won the Callahan Award, a collegiate MVP award determined by a vote of their peers. Callahan winners include Leila Tunnell (2011), Jonathan Nethercutt (2015), Matt Goechoe-Hanas (2019), Anne Worth (2020), and Dawn Culton (2022).

== Championships ==
=== NCAA team championships ===
North Carolina has won 52 NCAA team national championships.

- Men's (13)
  - Basketball (6): 1957, 1982, 1993, 2005, 2009, 2017
  - Lacrosse (5): 1981, 1982, 1986, 1991, 2016
  - Soccer (2): 2001, 2011
- Women's (39)
  - Basketball (1): 1994
  - Field Hockey (11): 1989, 1995, 1996, 1997, 2007, 2009, 2018, 2019, 2020, 2022, 2023
  - Lacrosse (4): 2013, 2016, 2022, 2025
  - Soccer (22): 1982, 1983, 1984, 1986, 1987, 1988, 1989, 1990, 1991, 1992, 1993, 1994, 1996, 1997, 1999, 2000, 2003, 2006, 2008, 2009, 2012, 2024
  - Tennis (1): 2023

Other national championship game appearances

- Men's (11)
  - Baseball (3): 2006, 2007, 2026
  - Basketball (6): 1946, 1968, 1977, 1981, 2016, 2022
  - Lacrosse (1): 1993
  - Soccer (1): 2008
  - Tennis (1): 2017
- Women's (20)
  - Field hockey (11): 1987, 1990, 1991, 1993, 1994, 2000, 2010, 2011, 2012, 2015, 2016
  - Lacrosse (2): 2009, 2015, 2026
  - Soccer (6): 1985, 1998, 2001, 2018, 2019, 2022
  - Tennis (1): 2014
- see also:
  - ACC NCAA team championships
  - List of NCAA schools with the most NCAA Division I championships

=== Other team national championships ===
Below are 27 team national titles that were not bestowed by the NCAA:

- Men's (12):
  - Australian rules football (1): 2004
  - Basketball (1): 1924*
  - Team Handball (3): 2004, 2005, 2006
  - Tennis (2): 2016***, 2021***
  - Ultimate (5) : 2015****, 2018****, 2021****, 2022****, 2023****
- Women's (16):
  - Soccer (1): 1981**
  - Team Handball (4): 2004, 2009, 2010, 2011
  - Tennis (7): 2013***, 2015***, 2018***, 2020***, 2021***, 2022***, 2023***
  - Ultimate (4): 2021****, 2022****, 2023****, 2024****

(*) Pre-NCAA tournament title (retrospectively selected by Helms Foundation in 1943 and Premo-Porretta Power Poll in 1995.)
(**) There was only one official AIAW soccer tournament, thus making North Carolina the only women's soccer team to win an AIAW championship
(***) ITA National Team Indoor Championships
(****) USA Ultimate College Championships

- see also:
  - List of NCAA schools with the most Division I national championships

== Rivalries ==
Carolina's primary rivalries are with its Tobacco Road counterparts Duke, North Carolina State, and Wake Forest. In recent years, the Carolina-Duke basketball series has attracted the most attention. In 2009, HBO made a documentary called "Battle for Tobacco Road: Duke vs. Carolina". The Tar Heels also have a rivalry with Virginia in college football, known as the South's Oldest Rivalry. UNC and UVA are the two oldest schools in the Atlantic Coast Conference.

== North Carolina Cheer ==
=== I'm a Tar Heel Born ===
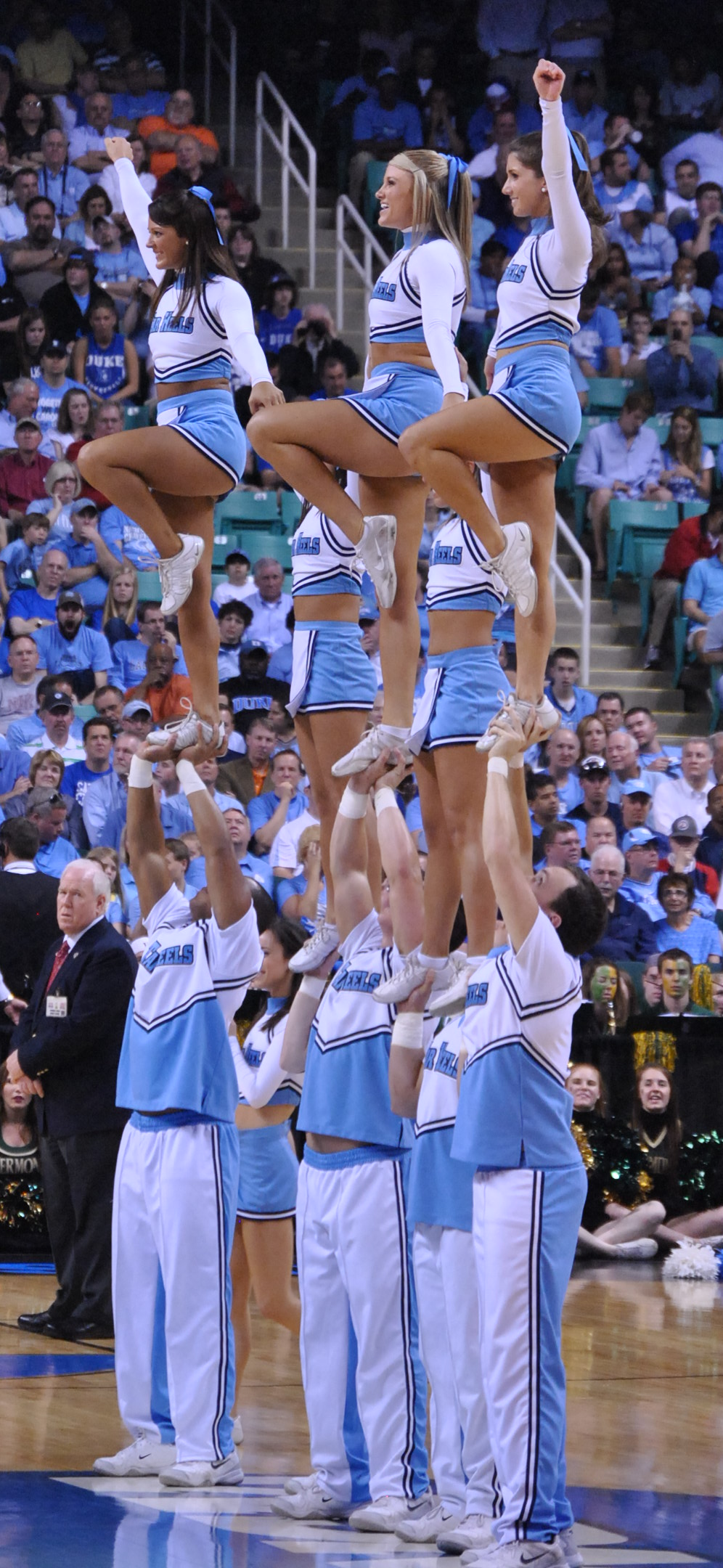
The North Carolina Cheerleaders entertain during a media timeout in Greensboro.

Carolina's main fight song is "I'm a Tar Heel Born". Its lyrics appear in the 1907 edition of the university's yearbook, the Yackety Yack, although how long it existed before that is not known. Some say that in the late 1920s it began to be sung as an add-on (or "tag") to the school's alma mater, "Hark The Sound", although the current version of the sheet music for "Hark the Sound" includes the "I'm a Tar Heel Born" tag as an integral part of the alma mater and credits the full song to William Starr Myers with a date of 1897. Today, the song is almost always played immediately after the singing of "Hark The Sound", even during more formal occasions such as convocation and commencement. Just before home football and basketball games, the song is played by the Bell Tower near the center of campus, and is often played after major victories.

As it appears in its 1907 printed form, the final words of the song are "Rah-rah, Carolina-lina, rah-rah-rah, Carolina-Lina, rah-rah, Carolina-lina! Rah, rah, rah!" Starting in the 1960s, however, "Rah, rah, rah!" was "unofficially" replaced with "Go to hell, State!"; NC State was UNC's main athletic rival for much of the first half of the 20th century. From the late 1980s onward, the "unofficial" final lyrics have been "Go to hell, Duke!"; reflecting Duke eclipsing State as Carolina's main rival. However, the State version was taught at freshman orientation well into the 1990a. "Rah, rah, rah!" is still sung by older fans.

Simply known as "Tag" by many Marching Tar Heel alumni, and titled as such on some recorded albums, "I'm a Tar Heel Born" has been adopted by at least three other colleges, including the University of Rhode Island, the University of Richmond, and Brown University.

=== "Here Comes Carolina" ===
Another popular song is "Here Comes Carolina".

As its title implies, it is most commonly played when a Tar Heel team enters the field of play. Traditionally, the band plays a version of the traditional orchestral warmup tune before launching into the song when the first player charges out of the tunnel. During the warmup tune, fans stand and clap along. The effect is similar to that of a train coming down the track.

From the early 1990s to around 2004, the band played the first seven notes of the song in different keys during player introductions at basketball games, modulating a half step each time before launching into the song in the normal key after the final player was announced.

The last part of the song's melody come from an old revival song, "Jesus Loves the Little Children".

== Notable alumni ==
Notable graduates from the athletic programs include Michael Jordan from men's basketball, Mia Hamm from women's soccer, Charlie Justice from American football, Davis Love III from golf, B.J. Surhoff from baseball, and Marion Jones from women's basketball and track & field.
