= 1979 NCAA Division I Wrestling Championships =

American collegiate wrestling tournament

Tournament information
- Sport: College wrestling
- Location: Ames, Iowa
- Dates: March 8, 1979–March 10, 1979
- Host(s): Iowa State University
- Venue(s): Hilton Coliseum

Final positions
- Champions: Iowa (4th title)
- 1st runners-up: Iowa State
- 2nd runners-up: Lehigh

Tournament statistics
- Attendance: 62,809
- MVP: Bruce Kinseth (Iowa)

The 1979 NCAA Division I Wrestling Championships were the 49th NCAA Division I Wrestling Championships to be held. Iowa State University in Ames, Iowa hosted the tournament at the Hilton Coliseum.

Iowa took home the team championship with 122.5 points with two individual champions.

Bruce Kinseth of Iowa received the Gorriaran Award as well as being named the Most Outstanding Wrestler.

== Team results ==
Rank	School	Points
1	Iowa	122.5
2	Iowa State	88
3	Lehigh	69.75
4	Oregon State	60.5
5	Wisconsin	56.5
6	Oklahoma State	52.75
7	Minnesota	43.75
8	Arizona State	34.5
9	Oklahoma	31.5
10	Michigan	25

== Individual finals ==
Weight class	Championship match (champion in boldface)
118 lbs	**Gene Mills**, Syracuse DEC Joe Gonzales, Cal State- Bakersfield, 16–13
126 lbs	**Randy Lewis**, Iowa DEC John Azevedo, Cal State-Bakersfield, 20–14
134 lbs	**Darryl Burley**, Lehigh DEC Mike Land, Iowa State, 9–7
142 lbs	**Dan Hicks**, Oregon State RD Scott Trizzino, Iowa, 5–5, 1–1
150 lbs	**Bruce Kinseth**, Iowa WBF Dick Knorr, Oregon State, 2:34
158 lbs	**Kelly Ward**, Iowa State DEC Dan Zilverberg, Minnesota, 7–2
167 lbs	**Mark Churella**, Michigan WBF Mike DeAnna, Iowa, 3:10
177 lbs	**Mark Lieberman**, Lehigh WDQ Bud Palmer, Iowa, 5:43
190 lbs	**Eric Wais**, Oklahoma State DEC Mike Brown, Lehigh, 12–5
UNL	**Fred Bohna**, UCLA DEC Dave Klemm, Eastern Illinois, 9–5
