= Ben Askren =

American wrestler and mixed martial artist (born 1984)

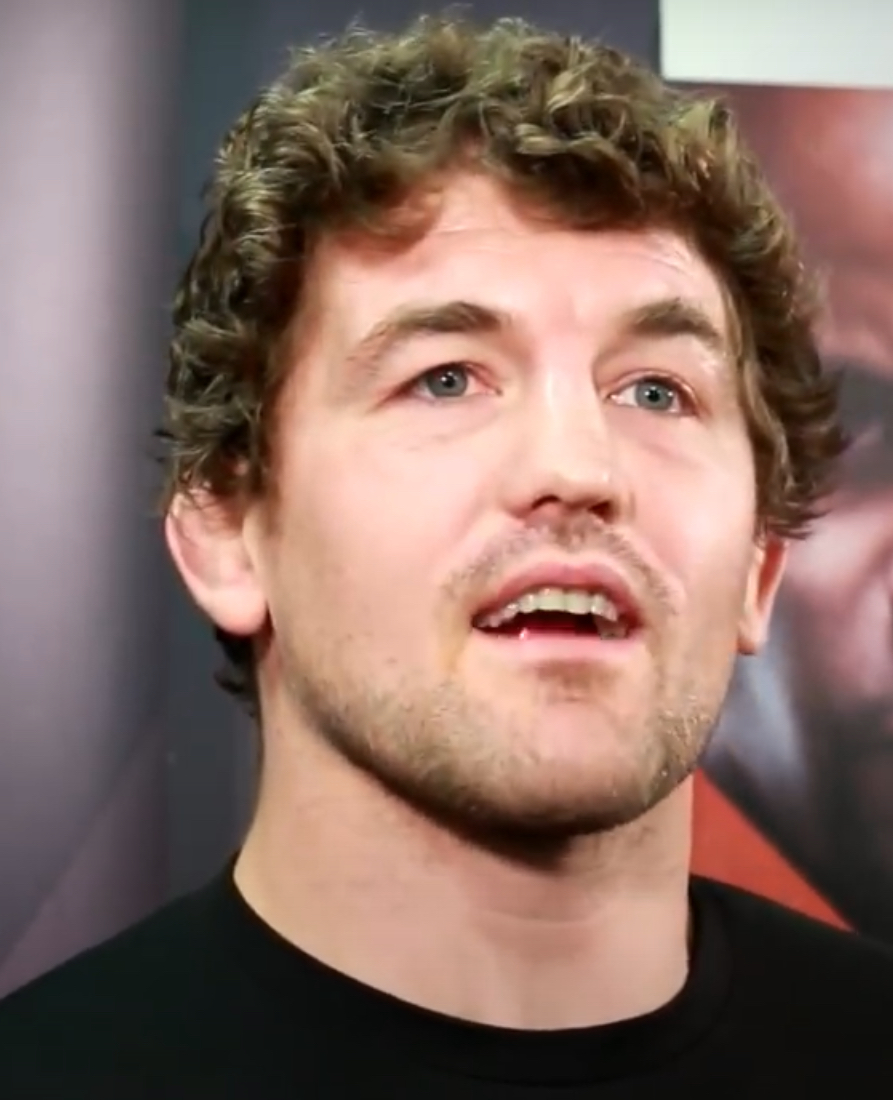
- Askren in 2018
- Born: Benjamin Michael Askren; July 18, 1984 (age 42); Cedar Rapids, Iowa, U.S.
- Nickname: Funky
- Height: 5 ft 10 in (178 cm)
- Weight: 170 lb (77 kg; 12 st 2 lb)
- Division: Cruiserweight (boxing); Middleweight / Welterweight (MMA) (Note: During Askren's tenure in ONE Championship, he competed at 185 lbs. ONE Championship refers to their 185 lb division as Welterweight, but per the Association of Boxing Commissions in the United States, 185 lbs is considered Middleweight.)
- Reach: 72 in (183 cm)
- Style: Wrestling
- Stance: Orthodox
- Fighting out of: Hartland, Wisconsin, U.S.
- Team: Roufusport (2009–present); Evolve MMA (2014–2017)
- Rank: Brown belt in Brazilian Jiu-Jitsu
- Wrestling: NCAA Division I Wrestling; Olympic Freestyle Wrestling
- Years active: 2005–2010, 2013–2015, 2019, 2026 (freestyle wrestling); 2009–2017, 2019 (MMA); 2021 (boxing)

Professional boxing record
- Total: 1
- Wins: 0
- By knockout: 0
- Losses: 1
- By knockout: 1

Mixed martial arts record
- Total: 22
- Wins: 19
- By knockout: 6
- By submission: 6
- By decision: 7
- Losses: 2
- By knockout: 1
- By submission: 1
- No contests: 1

Other information
- University: University of Missouri
- Boxing record from BoxRec
- Mixed martial arts record from Sherdog
Medal record
Representing the United States
Men's freestyle wrestling
Pan American Championships
Gold medal – first place	2005 Guatemala City	84 kg
Men's Grappling
World Championships
Gold medal – first place	2009 Fort Lauderdale	84 kg (No-Gi)
Men's collegiate wrestling
Representing the Missouri Tigers
NCAA Division I Championships
Gold medal – first place	2006 Oklahoma City	174 lb
Gold medal – first place	2007 Auburn Hills	174 lb
Silver medal – second place	2004 St. Louis	174 lb
Silver medal – second place	2005 St. Louis	174 lb
Big 12 Championships
Gold medal – first place	2004 Ames	174 lb
Gold medal – first place	2006 Ames	174 lb
Gold medal – first place	2007 Columbia	174 lb
Silver medal – second place	2005 Omaha	174 lb

Benjamin Michael Askren (born July 18, 1984) is an American former professional mixed martial artist, Olympic wrestler and boxer. He formerly competed in the Welterweight divisions of Bellator Fighting Championships and ONE FC, where he was the longest reigning Bellator Welterweight Champion and longest reigning ONE Welterweight World Champion. He also competed in the welterweight division of the UFC, where he peaked as the #5 ranked welterweight.

An accomplished grappler, he was a 2008 US Olympic Team Member and National champion in freestyle wrestling. He also was the 2005 Pan American champion as a freestyle wrestler. In college, Askren was a two-time NCAA Division I national champion (four-time finalist), and three-time Big 12 Conference champion (four-time finalist) for the Missouri Tigers, and was the second wrestler to secure multiple Dan Hodge Trophies (the wrestling equivalent of the Heisman Trophy) in folkstyle wrestling. He was also a world champion in submission wrestling.

Askren currently works for Real American Freestyle (RAF) as an ambassador, commentator, and matchmaker. He returned to active competition at RAF 11 against Belal Muhammad on July 18, 2026.

== Wrestling career ==
=== Early career and folkstyle ===
Askren was introduced to the sport of wrestling by his father Chuck at age six, but only took the sport seriously when he started the sixth grade and joined a club. During high school, he became a two-time Wisconsin Division I state champion in 2000 and 2001, out of Arrowhead High School in Wisconsin. Nationally, he placed at multiple US National tournaments in folkstyle, freestyle and Greco-Roman.

In college, Askren wrestled for the Missouri Tigers at 174 pounds, where he was teammates with future UFC Welterweight Champion Tyron Woodley and future Bellator Lightweight Champion Michael Chandler. During his freshman campaign (2003–04), Askren won the Big 12 Conference Championships and placed second at the NCAA Championships, with both matches being against standout from Oklahoma State Chris Pendleton. During his sophomore campaign (2004–05), Askren placed second at both the NCAA and Big 12 Championships, losing both championship matches to Pendleton. After being a runner-up for half of his career, Askren shined as a junior and a senior, becoming the third athlete to ever earn the Dan Hodge Trophy in multiple occasions, as he received the award in both seasons after compiling a combined 87–0 record. Throughout his career, Askren defeated multiple NCAA champions such as Jake Herbert and Keith Gavin. After a legendary run, Askren graduated with a 153–8 record (seven of the losses were handled by Chris Pendleton and one of them by Ryan Lange), two Dan Hodge Trophies (2006, 2007) and Schalles Awards (2006, 2007), two NCAA championships, three Big 12 Championships and 91 pins, the third most in NCAA Division I history.

One of the most dominant collegiate wrestlers of all time, Askren's "funky" style relied heavily in unorthodox scrambling techniques and was known for his pinning ability as well as his massive afro. His peculiar and uncommon body shape for a wrestler allowed him to complete moves that his competition could not, thus constantly putting them in awkward positions. On January 9, 2012, it was announced that Askren would be one of six new inductees to the University of Missouri Intercollegiate Athletics Hall of Fame.

=== Freestyle ===
Despite his style relying heavily in folkstyle rules, Askren was able to adapt fairly well to freestyle wrestling after his graduation from college. After working on adapting his style during 2007, Askren claimed the US National Championship in April and followed up by making the US Olympic Team in June. At the 2008 Summer Olympics, Askren defeated Hungarian István Veréb via fall in the first round, but fell in the quarterfinals to Cuba's Iván Fundora on points. Fundora was then defeated by Russia's Buvaisar Saitiev, thus eliminating Askren's chances of competing for a medal.

Askren was then asked if inexperience in the new ruleset was a factor, but he responded; "That wasn't it," he said with tears in his eyes, "I just wasn't good enough. I sucked."

=== Post-Olympic career and retirement ===
Although Askren decided to pursue a career in MMA after the Olympics, he continued to compete in wrestling occasionally. In 2010, he avenged his Olympic loss by defeating Fundora in the semifinals of the Cerro Pelado International in Cuba. This came shortly after Askren won the Dave Schultz Memorial International. Later the same year, Askren defeated 2009 world silver medalist Jake Herbert in a folkstyle rules match at the Midlands Tournament. Askren also competed in the Agon Wrestling Championships and the Flo Premier League. In May 2019, Askren lost by technical superiority to five-time World and Olympic champion Jordan Burroughs in the annual Beat the Streets benefit event.

After spending a little over a year in retirement from his MMA career, Askren announced a successful hip surgery in 2020 and revealed that he intended to return to competitive freestyle wrestling.

Askren was booked to wrestle at RAF 01 in August 2025, the debut event for Real American Freestyle, but was forced to withdraw after major health complications. RAF has since hired Askren as an ambassador, and he works as their matchmaker and commentator.

After several years away he returned against Belal Muhammad in the co-main event of RAF 11 on July 18, 2026. Askren lost the bout and announced his retirement afterwards. This fight earned him a Match of the Night award.

He was inducted into the National Wrestling Hall of Fame in 2026 as a Distinguished Member.

== Mixed martial arts career ==
=== Early career ===
Askren made his professional MMA debut on February 7, 2009. It was held by Headhunter Productions at the Holiday Inn Select Executive Center in Columbia, Missouri. He defeated Josh Flowers via TKO early in the first round.

Askren had his second fight at Patriot Act 2 in Columbia, Missouri. He defeated Mitchell Harris via submission by arm triangle. The fight was at a catchweight of 175 pounds.

=== Grappling ===
Askren competed at the 2009 ADCC Submission Wrestling World Championship from September 26–27, in Barcelona, Spain. He won his first match against Toni Linden by arm triangle choke. He lost his second match to Pablo Popovitch, a veteran grappler he had trained with the previous summer, by figure four footlock early in the match. Popovitch went on to win the championship in the under 77 kg (169 lb) division.

Askren also competed at the 2009 FILA 2° World Grappling Championship. Askren faced the 2008 World Champion, Jacob Volkmann, in the 84 kg no-gi division. Askren out-wrestled Volkmann and won gold in the category.

=== Bellator Fighting Championships ===
Askren was a participant in Bellator Fighting Championships Season 2 Welterweight Tournament. In his first fight, Askren defeated Ryan Thomas via technical submission at Bellator 14 on April 15, 2010. The outcome of the fight was controversial because Thomas protested the stoppage as soon as Askren released the choke.

After Jim Wallhead was pulled from the tournament, Thomas was given another chance to compete. Thomas defeated Jacob McClintock by TKO in the first round at Bellator 15 and was awarded a rematch with Askren. When the two fought at Bellator 19, Askren came out victorious again with a unanimous decision after controlling Thomas with wrestling for three rounds.

At Bellator 22, Askren defeated Dan Hornbuckle via unanimous decision with his superior wrestling dominating Hornbuckle for all three rounds, becoming the Bellator Season Two Welterweight Tournament Champion.

On October 21, 2010, in Philadelphia Askren took on the Bellator Welterweight Champion Lyman Good. Despite being hit with a brutal upkick and almost getting caught in a triangle choke with one minute left, he was able to take down and control Good in every round. Askren won via unanimous decision (49–46, 48–47, and 50–45) to win the Bellator Welterweight Championship.

Askren next returned at Bellator 40 to fight and defeat Nick Thompson after taking down and controlling Thompson for all three rounds. Although Askren started off quickly in the third round with a spinning back fist and several other strikes, he was caught with an overhand right by Thompson, causing Askren to take down and control Thompson for the remainder of the round. Askren went on to win by unanimous decision (30–26, 30–27, and 30–27).

Following his unanimous decision win over Thompson in a non-title affair at Bellator 40 in Newkirk, Oklahoma, Askren revealed that he was moving to Milwaukee to train under Duke Roufus at Roufusport.

Askren successfully defended his title against season 4 welterweight tournament winner Jay Hieron at Bellator 56 following a close split decision.

Askren successfully defended his title against season 5 welterweight tournament winner Douglas Lima at Bellator 64 on April 6, 2012, on Good Friday at the Caesars in Windsor, Canada.

Next for Askren was a title defense against Karl Amoussou, the fight taking place at Bellator 86 on January 24, 2013. Askren once again used his top control wrestling to shut down his opponents grappling, and opened a cut on Amoussou's forehead with an elbow strike. The doctor stepped in between the third and fourth rounds, judging the cut too severe for Amoussou to continue.

In the final fight of his contract, Askren faced tournament winner Andrey Koreshkov at Bellator 97. He dominated the fight with his wrestling and ground strikes, outstriking his opponent by a wide 248 to 3 margin before winning via TKO in the fourth round.

On November 14, 2013, following a negotiation period, Bellator announced they had released Askren from the company, and that he was now an unrestricted free agent.

=== ONE Championship ===
On December 9, 2013, Askren signed a two-year, six-fight contract with ONE Championship.

Askren met Bakhtiyar Abbasov, who had been riding a nine-fight win streak, in the main event of ONE FC: Honor and Glory on May 30. He won the fight via submission (arm-triangle choke) in the first round, and proceeded to call out ONE champion Nobutatsu Suzuki, stating "Suzuki is going to bring me my belt. He can put it in the middle of the cage and give it to me, or I can take it the hard way!”

Askren faced Suzuki at ONE Fighting Championship: Reign of Champions on August 29, 2014. He won the fight via TKO due to strikes in the first round to become the new ONE Welterweight Champion.

Askren faced Luis Santos in the main event at ONE Championship: Valor of Champions on April 24. The fight was ruled "no contest" after an accidental eye poke from Askren at 2:19 of round 1 rendered Santos unable to continue.

In the next fight Askren beat Russia's Nikolay Aleksakhin at the ONE Championship: Global Warriors on April 15, 2016, by unanimous decision.

Askren then fought Agilan Thani at the ONE Championship: Dynasty of Heroes on May 26, 2017. He won the fight via submission due to an arm-triangle choke in the first round.

Askren then faced Zebaztian Kadestam at the ONE Championship: Shanghai on September 7, 2017. He won the fight via TKO due to punches.

Askren then faced fellow veteran Shinya Aoki at ONE Championship: Immortal Pursuit on November 24, 2017. Prior to the bout, he claimed this would be his last fight. He won the fight via TKO due to punches early in the first round. He retired from the sport after the win.

Askren left the door open for one last match if he was made an offer to "prove I'm the best welterweight in the world". He discussed the possibility of facing Georges St-Pierre, claiming "He doesn't want a title fight. He just wants to build on his legacy," adding that he felt he would be the perfect opponent for St. Pierre. The contest never materialized.

=== Ultimate Fighting Championship ===
On November 3, 2018, it was announced that the UFC had signed Askren under the "trade UFC and One Championship agreement", in exchange for former UFC Flyweight Champion Demetrious Johnson.

Askren made his UFC debut against the former UFC Welterweight Champion Robbie Lawler on March 2, 2019, at UFC 235. The bout was initially scheduled for UFC 233, but after the event was cancelled the fight was rescheduled for UFC 235. Askren won the fight via bulldog choke in the first round, through a controversial stoppage by referee Herb Dean. Replays appear to show Lawler's arm going limp and giving a thumbs up right after, which some attribute to Lawler slipping in and out of consciousness. Although controversial, Nevada Athletic Commission executive director Bob Bennett explained that the commission had "no problem" with Dean's decision to stop the fight.

Askren faced long-time veteran Jorge Masvidal on July 6, 2019, at UFC 239. Leading up to the match, Askren utilized heavy trash-talk as usual. He was knocked out with a flying knee five seconds into the first round, the fastest knockout in UFC history, ending his undefeated run.

Askren faced ADCC World Champion and MMA veteran Demian Maia on October 26, 2019, at UFC on ESPN+ 20, and lost the fight via technical submission in round three. This fight earned him the Fight of the Night award.

=== Retirement ===
On November 18, 2019, Askren announced his official retirement from mixed martial arts competition. Since his retirement, as early as 2021, Askren has repeatedly expressed interest in returning for one more bout in mixed martial arts, should he be able to have a rematch with his former rival Masvidal in the right circumstances, should they be presented in the future.

== Boxing career ==
After a back-and-forth on social media, Askren fought Jake Paul in a boxing match on April 17, 2021, losing by TKO in round one. The fight sold 500,000 PPV buys.

== Personal life ==
Askren is competitive in the sport of disc golf. In 2009, Askren finished ninth in the Amateur World Championships. Askren is sponsored by Discraft. He is also involved in cryptocurrency investing.

Askren married his wife Amy in 2010 and together they have three children.

Askren co-hosts the weekly podcast Funky and the Champ with Daniel Cormier. He previously co-hosted FloWrestling Radio Live with Christian Pyles on FloWrestling, The Funky & FRB Show with Front Row Brian on Rokfin, and The T-Row & Funky Show with Tommy Rowlands.

Askren had previously stated that he was not religious, but he reported deciding to become a Christian after awakening from a 45-day coma.

=== 2025 hospitalization ===
On June 7, 2025, Askren's wife, Amy Askren, announced in a social media post that Askren had been hospitalized with "severe pneumonia" that had developed as a result of a staph infection and that he was sedated, in a critical condition, and would likely require a lung transplant. On June 17, 2025, Amy Askren posted on social media that, though Askren remained on a ventilator and an extracorporeal membrane oxygenation system, he was showing signs of improvement, being "able to open his eyes and squeeze hands".

The news of Askren's illness prompted messages of support and well-wishes for Askren and his family from the UFC, who broadcast a video of Askren's career highlights during UFC on ESPN: Usman vs. Buckley, as well as members of the MMA community, such as Henry Cejudo and Ariel Helwani. On June 30, 2025, Askren's wife announced in a social media post that Askren had received a double lung transplant. On July 9, 2025, Askren posted a video discussing his condition on social media. He said that he had no memory from May 28 to July 2 and that he flatlined four times and had lost 50 pounds (23 kg) in weight during his illness.

A year after his double lung transplant, Askren spoke publicly about his recovery following his return to active competition at RAF 11. Askren shared that "everything's headed in a really good direction" and "I'm almost to the point where it seems like a bad dream."

== Championships and accomplishments ==
=== Mixed martial arts ===
- Ultimate Fighting Championship
  - Fight of the Night (One time) vs. Demian Maia
- Bellator Fighting Championships
  - Bellator Welterweight Championship (One time)
  - Four successful title defenses
  - Bellator Season 2 Welterweight Tournament Championship
  - Most consecutive title defenses in Bellator history (4)
  - Most successful title defenses in Bellator history (4)
  - Undefeated (9–0)
- ONE Championship
  - ONE Welterweight Championship (One time)
  - Three successful title defenses
    - undefeated (7–0)
- MMA Weekly
  - 2025 Fighter of the Year

=== Disc golf ===
- Professional Disc Golf Association
  - 2011 United States Amateur Disc Golf Championship 2nd Place
  - 2009 PDGA Amateur World Doubles Championships Advanced 4th Place
  - 2009 St. Louis Open Advanced 2nd Place
  - 2009 Mighty MO Advanced 1st Place
  - 2009 First Class Challenge 3rd place
  - 2006 Alabama Amateur Open Intermediate 3rd Place
  - 2005 Highnoon at Indiantown Intermediate 2nd Place

=== Submission grappling ===
- Abu Dhabi Combat Club
  - 2009 ADCC Submission Wrestling World Championships Quarterfinalist
- International Federation of Associated Wrestling Styles
  - FILA 2009 Grappling World Championships Senior No-Gi Gold Medalist
- USA Wrestling
  - FILA World Team Trials Senior No-Gi Winner (2009)

=== Amateur wrestling ===
- Real American Freestyle
  - Match of the Night (One time) vs. Belal Muhammad
- International Federation of Associated Wrestling Styles
  - 2010 Cerro Pelado International Senior Freestyle Silver Medalist
  - 2010 Dave Schultz Memorial International Open Senior Freestyle Gold Medalist
  - 2009 Hargobind International Senior Freestyle Gold Medalist
  - 2009 Sunkist Kids International Open Senior Freestyle Silver Medalist
  - 2008 Kyiv International Senior Freestyle Bronze Medalist
  - 2007 NYAC Holiday International Open Senior Freestyle Gold Medalist
  - 2007 Hargobind International Tournament Senior Freestyle Gold Medalist
  - 2005 Pan American Championships Senior Freestyle Gold Medalist
- USA Wrestling
  - USA Senior Freestyle Olympic Team Trials Winner (2008)
  - USA Junior Freestyle World Team Trials Winner (2004)
  - USA Senior Freestyle National Championship (2008)
  - ASICS Tiger High School All-American (2002)
  - West Junior Freestyle Regional Championship (2002)
  - Northern Plains Junior Freestyle Regional Championship (2001, 2002)
- National Collegiate Athletic Association
  - NCAA Division I Collegiate National Champion (2006, 2007)
  - NCAA Division I All-American (2004, 2005, 2006, 2007) 4x NCAA Finalist
  - Big 12 Conference Championship (2004, 2006, 2007)
  - Dan Hodge Trophy Collegiate Wrestler of the Year (2006, 2007)
  - University of Missouri Intercollegiate Athletics Hall of Fame (2012)
- National Wrestling Coaches Association
  - Schalles Award Top Collegiate Pinner of the Year (2006, 2007)
- National High School Coaches Association
  - NHSCA Senior High School National Championship Runner-up (2002)
  - NHSCA Senior All-American (2002)
- Wisconsin Interscholastic Athletic Association
  - WIAA Division I High School State Championship (2000, 2001)
  - WIAA Division I All-State (1999, 2000, 2001)
  - Classic 8 Conference Championship (1999, 2000, 2001, 2002)
- George Tragos/Lou Thesz Professional Wrestling Hall of Fame
  - George Tragos Award (2018)

== Mixed martial arts record ==
Professional record breakdown
22 matches	19 wins	2 losses
By knockout	6	1
By submission	6	1
By decision	7	0
No contests	1	

Res.	Record	Opponent	Method	Event	Date	Round	Time	Location	Notes
Loss	19–2 (1)	Demian Maia	Technical Submission (rear-naked choke)	UFC Fight Night: Maia vs. Askren	October 26, 2019	3	3:54	Kallang, Singapore	Fight of the Night.
Loss	19–1 (1)	Jorge Masvidal	KO (flying knee)	UFC 239	July 6, 2019	1	0:05	Las Vegas, Nevada, United States	
Win	19–0 (1)	Robbie Lawler	Technical Submission (bulldog choke)	UFC 235	March 2, 2019	1	3:20	Las Vegas, Nevada, United States	
Win	18–0 (1)	Shinya Aoki	TKO (punches)	ONE: Immortal Pursuit	November 24, 2017	1	0:57	Kallang, Singapore	Defended the ONE Welterweight Championship. Askren vacated the title on October 27, 2018.
Win	17–0 (1)	Zebaztian Kadestam	TKO (punches)	ONE: Shanghai	September 2, 2017	2	4:09	Shanghai, China	Defended the ONE Welterweight Championship.
Win	16–0 (1)	Agilan Thani	Submission (arm-triangle choke)	ONE: Dynasty of Heroes	May 26, 2017	1	2:20	Kallang, Singapore	Defended the ONE Welterweight Championship.
Win	15–0 (1)	Nikolay Aleksakhin	Decision (unanimous)	ONE: Global Rivals	April 15, 2016	5	5:00	Pasay, Philippines	Non-title bout; Aleksakhin missed weight (187 lb).
NC	14–0 (1)	Luis Santos	No Contest (accidental eye poke)	ONE: Valor of Champions	April 24, 2015	1	2:19	Pasay, Philippines	Retained the ONE Welterweight Championship. Accidental eye poke rendered Santos unable to continue.
Win	14–0	Nobutatsu Suzuki	TKO (punches)	ONE FC: Reign of Champions	August 29, 2014	1	1:24	Dubai, United Arab Emirates	Won the ONE Welterweight Championship.
Win	13–0	Bakhtiyar Abbasov	Submission (arm-triangle choke)	ONE FC 16: Honor and Glory	May 30, 2014	1	4:21	Kallang, Singapore	
Win	12–0	Andrey Koreshkov	TKO (punches)	Bellator 97	July 31, 2013	4	2:58	Rio Rancho, New Mexico, United States	Defended the Bellator Welterweight World Championship. Askren vacated the title on November 14, 2013.
Win	11–0	Karl Amoussou	TKO (doctor stoppage)	Bellator 86	January 24, 2013	3	5:00	Thackerville, Oklahoma, United States	Defended the Bellator Welterweight World Championship.
Win	10–0	Douglas Lima	Decision (unanimous)	Bellator 64	April 6, 2012	5	5:00	Windsor, Ontario, Canada	Defended the Bellator Welterweight World Championship.
Win	9–0	Jay Hieron	Decision (split)	Bellator 56	October 29, 2011	5	5:00	Kansas City, Kansas, United States	Defended the Bellator Welterweight World Championship.
Win	8–0	Nick Thompson	Decision (unanimous)	Bellator 40	April 9, 2011	3	5:00	Newkirk, Oklahoma, United States	Non-title bout; Thompson missed weight (170.8 lb).
Win	7–0	Lyman Good	Decision (unanimous)	Bellator 33	October 21, 2010	5	5:00	Philadelphia, Pennsylvania, United States	Won the Bellator Welterweight World Championship.
Win	6–0	Dan Hornbuckle	Decision (unanimous)	Bellator 22	June 17, 2010	3	5:00	Kansas City, Missouri, United States	Won the Bellator Season 2 Welterweight Tournament.
Win	5–0	Ryan Thomas	Decision (unanimous)	Bellator 19	May 20, 2010	3	5:00	Grand Prairie, Texas, United States	Bellator Season 2 Welterweight Tournament Semifinal.
Win	4–0	Ryan Thomas	Technical Submission (guillotine choke)	Bellator 14	April 15, 2010	1	2:40	Chicago, Illinois, United States	Bellator Season 2 Welterweight Tournament Quarterfinal.
Win	3–0	Matt Delanoit	Submission (north-south choke)	Max Fights DM: Ballroom Brawl	August 28, 2009	1	1:15	Des Moines, Iowa, United States	
Win	2–0	Mitchell Harris	Submission (arm-triangle choke)	Headhunter Productions: The Patriot Act 2	April 25, 2009	1	1:27	Columbia, Missouri, United States	Catchweight (175 lb) bout.
Win	1–0	Josh Flowers	TKO (punches)	Headhunter Productions: The Patriot Act	February 7, 2009	1	1:25	Columbia, Missouri, United States	Welterweight debut.

== Freestyle record ==
Res.	Record	Opponent	Score	Date	Event	Location
Loss	31–12	(United States) Belal Muhammad	3–6	July 18, 2026	RAF 11: Tsarukyan vs. Covington	(United States) Milwaukee, Wisconsin
Loss	31–11	(United States) Jordan Burroughs	TF 0–11	May 6, 2019	2019 Beat The Streets: Grapple at the Garden	(United States) New York City, New York
Loss	31–10	(United States) Clayton Foster	3–10	January 20, 2015	Flo Premier League IV	(United States) Wales, Wisconsin
Win	31–9	(United States) Michael Poeta	OT 11–10	January 26, 2014	Agon III	(United States) Whitewater, Wisconsin
Win	30–9	(United States) Quentin Wright	22–8	October 27, 2013	Agon I	(United States) Las Vegas, Nevada
2010 US World Team Trials DNP at 74 kg
Loss	29–9	(United States) Travis Paulson	0–1, 1–3	June 11, 2010	2010 US World Team Trials	(United States) Council Bluffs, Iowa
Win	29–8	(United States) Terry Madden	1–0, 4–1	June 11, 2010	2010 US World Team Trials	(United States) Council Bluffs, Iowa
Win	28–8	(United States) Moza Fay	TF 9–2	May 13, 2010	2010 Beat The Streets: Battle on the Intrepid	(United States) New York City, New York
2010 Dave Schultz Memorial (gold) at 74 kg
Win	27–8	(United States) Trent Paulson	Fall	February 5, 2010	2010 Dave Schultz Memorial International Open	(United States) Colorado Springs, Colorado
Win	26–8	(Russia) Rashid Kurbanov	Fall	February 5, 2010	2010 Dave Schultz Memorial International Open	(United States) Colorado Springs, Colorado
Win	25–8	(Canada) Mathew Jud Gentry	1–2, 5–0, 4–0	February 5, 2010	2010 Dave Schultz Memorial International Open	(United States) Colorado Springs, Colorado
Win	24–8	(United States) Brian Surage	5–0, 6–0	February 5, 2010	2010 Dave Schultz Memorial International Open	(United States) Colorado Springs, Colorado
Win	23–8	(Spain) Airam Gonzalez Garcia	Fall	February 5, 2010	2010 Dave Schultz Memorial International Open	(United States) Colorado Springs, Colorado
2009 Sunkist Open (silver) at 74 kg
Loss	22–8	(United States) Chris Pendleton	1–2, 1–1	October 24, 2009	2009 Sunkist International Open	(United States) Phoenix, Arizona
Win	22–7	(United States) Keith Gavin	4–1, 7–4	October 24, 2009	2009 Sunkist International Open	(United States) Phoenix, Arizona
Win	21–7	(United States) Benjamin Wissel	1–0, 7–0	October 24, 2009	2009 Sunkist International Open	(United States) Phoenix, Arizona
Win	20–7	(United States) Matt Wilps	Fall	October 24, 2009	2009 Sunkist International Open	(United States) Phoenix, Arizona
2008 Summer Olympics 7th at 74 kg
Loss	19–7	(Cuba) Ivan Fundora	1–3, 0–4	August 12, 2008	2008 Summer Olympics	Beijing, China
Win	19–6	(Hungary) István Veréb	Fall	August 12, 2008	2008 Summer Olympics	Beijing, China
2008 US Olympic Team Trials (gold) at 74 kg
Win	18–6	(United States) Tyrone Lewis	2–6, 2–0, 1–0	June 15, 2008	2008 US Olympic Team Trials	(United States) Las Vegas, Nevada
Win	17–6	(United States) Tyrone Lewis	2–0, 1–0	June 15, 2008	2008 US Olympic Team Trials	(United States) Las Vegas, Nevada
Win	16–6	(United States) Ramico Blackmon	1–0, 2–1	June 15, 2008	2008 US Olympic Team Trials	(United States) Las Vegas, Nevada
Win	15–6	(United States) Donny Pritzlaff	3–0, 1–1	June 15, 2008	2008 US Olympic Team Trials	(United States) Las Vegas, Nevada
2008 US Nationals (gold) at 74 kg
Win	14–6	(United States) Tyrone Lewis	3–0, 3–2	April 26, 2008	2008 US National Championships	(United States) Las Vegas, Nevada
Win	13–6	(United States) Ryan Churella	4–0, 5–2	April 26, 2008	2008 US National Championships	(United States) Las Vegas, Nevada
Win	12–6	(United States) Ramico Blackmon	8–4, 6–0	April 26, 2008	2008 US National Championships	(United States) Las Vegas, Nevada
2007 NYAC Open (gold) at 74 kg
Win	11–6	(United States) Donny Pritzlaff	3–0, 1–0	November 17, 2007	2007 NYAC Open	(United States) New York City, New York
Win	10–6	(United States) Ramico Blackman	0–2, 1–0, 2–0	November 17, 2007	2007 NYAC Open	(United States) New York City, New York
Win	9–6	(Russia) Rashid Kurbanov	2–2, 5–0	November 17, 2007	2007 NYAC Open	(United States) New York City, New York
Win	8–6	(Canada) Matt Gentry	3–2, 3–1	November 17, 2007	2007 NYAC Open	(United States) New York City, New York
2007 Sunkist Open 4th at 74 kg
Loss	7–6	(United States) Matthew Lackey	0–4, 2–6	October 28, 2007	2007 Sunkist International Open	(United States) Arizona
Win	7–5	(United States) Travis Koppenhafer	4–1, 2–1	October 28, 2007	2007 Sunkist International Open	(United States) Arizona
Loss	6–5	(United States) Travis Paulson	6–0, 1–3, 0–2	October 28, 2007	2007 Sunkist International Open	(United States) Arizona
Win	6–4	(United States) Joey Hooker	4–0, 6–0	October 28, 2007	2007 Sunkist International Open	(United States) Arizona
Win	5–4	(United States) Chance Goodman	TF 6–0, 6–0	October 28, 2007	2007 Sunkist International Open	(United States) Arizona
Win	4–4	(United States) Matthew Lackey	TF 5–3, 6–0	October 28, 2007	2007 Sunkist International Open	(United States) Arizona
2007 US World Team Trials DNP at 74 kg
Loss	3–4	(United States) Ramico Blackmon	1–4, 1–4	June 10, 2007	2007 US World Team Trials	(United States) Las Vegas, Nevada
Win	3–3	(United States) Travis Paulson	4–3, 1–0	June 10, 2007	2007 US World Team Trials	(United States) Las Vegas, Nevada
Loss	2–3	(United States) Donny Pritzlaff	0–2, 1–3	June 10, 2007	2007 US World Team Trials	(United States) Las Vegas, Nevada
2007 US Nationals 6th at 74 kg
Loss	2–2	(United States) Donny Pritzlaff	0–2, 0–7	April 7, 2007	2007 US National Championships	(United States) Las Vegas, Nevada
Loss	2–1	(United States) Joe Heskett	3–2, 2–5, 1–1	April 7, 2007	2007 US National Championships	(United States) Las Vegas, Nevada
Win	2–0	(United States) Tyrone Lewis	1–0, 1–1	April 7, 2007	2007 US National Championships	(United States) Las Vegas, Nevada
Win	1–0	(United States) David Bolyard	TF 10–3, 7–1	April 7, 2007	2007 US National Championships	(United States) Las Vegas, Nevada

== NCAA record ==
NCAA Championships Matches
Res.	Record	Opponent	Score	Date	Event
2007 NCAA Championships (gold) at 174 lbs
Win	17–2	Keith Gavin	8–2	March 15–17, 2007	2007 NCAA Division I Wrestling Championships
Win	16–2	Eric Luedke	8–3	March 15–17, 2007	2007 NCAA Division I Wrestling Championships
Win	15–2	Matt Palmer	Fall	March 15–17, 2007	2007 NCAA Division I Wrestling Championships
Win	14–2	Gabriel Dretsch	Fall	March 15–17, 2007	2007 NCAA Division I Wrestling Championships
Win	13–2	Lloyd Rogers	Fall	March 15–17, 2007	2007 NCAA Division I Wrestling Championships
2006 NCAA Championships (gold) at 174 lbs
Win	12–2	Jake Herbert	MD 14–2	March 16–18, 2006	2006 NCAA Division I Wrestling Championships
Win	11–2	Mike Patrovich	TF 21–6	March 16–18, 2006	2006 NCAA Division I Wrestling Championships
Win	10–2	Travis Frick	TF 19–3	March 16–18, 2006	2006 NCAA Division I Wrestling Championships
Win	9–2	Wes Roberts	6–4	March 16–18, 2006	2006 NCAA Division I Wrestling Championships
Win	8–2	Christian Arellano	9–2	March 16–18, 2006	2006 NCAA Division I Wrestling Championships
2005 NCAA Championships (silver) at 174 lbs
Loss	7–2	Chris Pendleton	5–10	March 17–19, 2005	2005 NCAA Division I Wrestling Championships
Win	7–1	Pete Friedl	7–2	March 17–19, 2005	2005 NCAA Division I Wrestling Championships
Win	6–1	E.K. Waldhaus	MD 17–4	March 17–19, 2005	2005 NCAA Division I Wrestling Championships
Win	5–1	Brady Richardson	MD 9–0	March 17–19, 2005	2005 NCAA Division I Wrestling Championships
Win	4–1	Mark Himes	TF 18–2	March 17–19, 2005	2005 NCAA Division I Wrestling Championships
2004 NCAA Championships (silver) at 174 lbs
Loss	3–1	Chris Pendleton	4–11	March 18–20, 2004	2004 NCAA Division I Wrestling Championships
Win	3–0	Tyler Nixt	4–2	March 18–20, 2004	2004 NCAA Division I Wrestling Championships
Win	2–0	Brad Dillon	SV 12–7	March 18–20, 2004	2004 NCAA Division I Wrestling Championships
Win	1–0	Matt Herrington	Fall	March 18–20, 2004	2004 NCAA Division I Wrestling Championships

== Professional boxing record ==
1 fight	0 wins	1 loss
By knockout	0	1

No.	Result	Record	Opponent	Type	Round, time	Date	Location	Notes
1	Loss	0–1	Jake Paul	TKO	1 (8), 1:59	Apr 17, 2021	Mercedes-Benz Stadium, Atlanta, Georgia, U.S.	

== Submission grappling record ==
Result	Rec	Opponent	Method	Event	Date	Division	Location
Win	12–2	(United States) Gerald Meerschaert	Submission (D’Arce choke)	Absolute Grappling Grand Prix at Wisconsin State Fair	August 5, 2011	Absolute	West Allis, Wisconsin, United States
Win	11–2	(Brazil) Rafael "Formiga" Barbosa	Points (23–0)	Absolute Grappling Grand Prix at Wisconsin State Fair	August 5, 2011	Absolute	West Allis, Wisconsin, United States
Win	10–2	(United States) Lyndon Viteri	Submission (arm-triangle choke)	Absolute Grappling Grand Prix at Wisconsin State Fair	August 5, 2011	Absolute	West Allis, Wisconsin, United States
Loss	9–2	(Brazil) Francisco "Sinistro" Iturralde	Advantage points (3–4)	IBJJF 2010 Nogi Jiu Jitsu World Championship	November 7, 2010	-82 kg (purple)	Long Beach, California, United States
Win	9–1	(United States) Jacob Volkmann	Points (3–1)	FILA 2009 Grappling World Championship	December 12, 2009	-84 kg	Fort Lauderdale, Florida, United States
Win	8–1	(United States) Jeff Funicello	Points (4–0)	FILA 2009 Grappling World Championship	December 12, 2009	-84 kg	Fort Lauderdale, Florida, United States
Win	7–1	(Brazil) Gabriel Kitober	Points (5–4)	FILA 2009 Grappling World Championship	December 12, 2009	-84 kg	Fort Lauderdale, Florida, United States
Win	6–1	(Italy) Bernardo Serrini	Submission (choke)	FILA 2009 Grappling World Championship	December 12, 2009	-84 kg	Fort Lauderdale, Florida, United States
Win	5–1	(United States) Jacob Volkmann	Points (6–0)	USA Grappling World Team Trials	October 23, 2009	-84 kg	Phoenix, Arizona, United States
Win	4–1	(United States) Shannon Ritch	Submission (armbar)	USA Grappling World Team Trials	October 23, 2009	-84 kg	Phoenix, Arizona, United States
Win	3–1	(United States) Shane Cross	Submission (north-south choke)	USA Grappling World Team Trials	October 23, 2009	-84 kg	Phoenix, Arizona, United States
Win	2–1	(United States) Danny Rubenstein	Submission (D'Arce choke)	USA Grappling World Team Trials	October 23, 2009	-84 kg	Phoenix, Arizona, United States
Loss	1–1	(Brazil) Pablo Popovitch	Submission (toe hold)	ADCC 2009 Submission Wrestling World Championship	September 26, 2009	-77 kg	Barcelona, Spain
Win	1–0	(Finland) Toni Linden	Submission (arm-triangle choke)	ADCC 2009 Submission Wrestling World Championship	September 26, 2009	-77 kg	Barcelona, Spain

== See also ==
- List of Bellator MMA alumni
- List of ONE Championship alumni
- List of male mixed martial artists
- List of mixed martial artists with professional boxing records
- List of multi-sport athletes
- List of multi-sport champions

== Notes ==
Awards and achievements
Preceded by Lyman Good	2nd Bellator Welterweight World Champion; October 21, 2010 – November 14, 2013; Vacated	Vacant Title next held by Douglas Lima
