= Joe Dubuque =

American wrestler and coach (born 1982)

Personal information
- Born: May 17, 1982 (age 44) Bloomfield, New Jersey, U.S.

Sport
- Sport: Wrestling
- Event: Folkstyle
- College team: Indiana Hoosiers
Medal record
Men's collegiate wrestling
Representing the Indiana Hoosiers
NCAA Division I Championships
Gold medal – first place	2005 St. Louis	125 lb
Gold medal – first place	2006 Oklahoma City	125 lb

Joe Dubuque (born May 17, 1982) is an American former wrestler commonly referred to as "The Champ". He wrestling collegiately at Indiana University Bloomington. Dubuque is from Glen Ridge, New Jersey.

== Wrestling career ==
Dubuque attended Glen Ridge High School in Glen Ridge, Essex County, New Jersey, where he was a two-time state champion wrestler. Competing for Indiana University, Dubuque won an NCAA Division I wrestling title at 125 pounds in 2005, beating Kyle Ott of the University of Illinois 2–0.

In 2006, he repeated as champion, beating Troy Nickerson of Cornell University. Dubuque was also an All-American in 2004, wrestling back from a preliminary round pin. Dubuque was the first wrestler in Indiana University history to be a two-time national champion.

Dubuque served as the assistant wrestling coach for Hofstra University wrestling team from 2007 to 2009. Dubuque then returned to Bloomington as an assistant coach for Indiana University for the 2010 season. In 2012, Dubuque returned to New Jersey to be an assistant coach at Princeton University.

He earned a bachelor's degree in recreation sports management from Indiana.
