= Dan Hodge Trophy =

Collegiate wrestling award

The Dan Hodge Trophy is awarded each year to the United States of America’s best college wrestler. The trophy is presented at the end of the season by WIN magazine and Culture House. It is the collegiate wrestling equivalent to the Heisman Trophy in college football. Its high school wrestling equivalent is the Junior Hodge Trophy, which has been awarded annually since 1998. Its women's collegiate wrestling equivalent is the Anthony-Maroulis Trophy, which has been awarded annually since 2023.

The Hodge Trophy is named after Danny Hodge, a three–time NCAA champion for the University of Oklahoma from 1955 to 1957. The Hodge Trophy was created by Mike Chapman, founder of WIN magazine and Culture House, a company that produces books and posters. The first winner was T.J. Jaworsky, a three–time NCAA Division I National champion from the University of North Carolina at Chapel Hill in 1995.

There have been six multiple winners of the Hodge Trophy. The first was Iowa State's legend Cael Sanderson, who won the award three times in his run as the first undefeated four–time NCAA champion, the second was Ben Askren from Missouri, who won the award two times, the third and fourth were David Taylor and Zain Retherford respectively, both from Penn State, who won the award two times, the fifth is Spencer Lee from Iowa, and the sixth (and most recent) is Gable Steveson, who won the award two times, becoming the only heavyweight to do so.

== Award criteria ==
Since 2022, the Hodge Trophy Voting Criteria has been based on four criteria:

1. Record
2. Dominance/Bonus-Point Percentage
3. Quality of Competition
4. Sportsmanship

Formerly, the trophy was awarded based on seven criteria:

1. Record
2. Number of pins
3. Dominance
4. Past credentials
5. Quality of competition
6. Sportsmanship/Citizenship
7. Heart

== Hodge Trophy Winners ==
Year	Recipient	Weight	School	Finalists*
2026	Mitchell Mesenbrink	165	Penn State	Mitchell Mesenbrink (66), Jax Forrest (4), Josh Barr (1), Luke Lilledahl, Sergio Vega, Levi Haines, Isaac Trumble
2025	Wyatt Hendrickson	285	Oklahoma State	Wyatt Hendrickson (30), Carter Starocci (26), Mitchell Mesenbrink (3)
2024	Aaron Brooks	197	Penn State	Aaron Brooks (48), Parker Keckeisen (8), Carter Starocci (2), Greg Kerkvliet (1), Levi Haines (0)
2023	Mason Parris	285	Michigan	Mason Parris (38), Carter Starocci (14), Yianni Diakomihalis (6), Andrew Alirez (4), Austin O'Connor (2)
2022	Gable Steveson	285	Minnesota	Gable Steveson (49), Yianni Diakomihalis (5), Nick Lee (3)
2021**	Spencer Lee; Gable Steveson	125; 285	Iowa Minnesota	Spencer Lee, Gable Steveson, David Carr, Roman Bravo-Young, Aaron Brooks, Austin O'Connor
2020	Spencer Lee	125	Iowa	Spencer Lee (52), Kollin Moore (3), Ryan Deakin (1), Shane Griffith (1), Noah Adams (0), Pat Glory (0), Chas Tucker (0), Gable Steveson (0)
2019	Bo Nickal	197	Penn State	Bo Nickal (37), Jason Nolf (10), Co-Winner Nickal/Nolf (4), Yianni Diakomihalis (0), Anthony Ashnault (0)
2018	Zain Retherford	149	Penn State	Zain Retherford (35), Bo Nickal (6), Seth Gross (4), Zahid Valencia (3)
2017	Zain Retherford	149	Penn State	Zain Retherford (33), J'Den Cox (5), Kyle Snyder (4), Jason Nolf (3)
2016	Alex Dieringer	165	Oklahoma State	Alex Dieringer (27), Zain Retherford (14), Kyle Snyder (3), Nahshon Garrett (1)
2015	Logan Stieber	141	Ohio State	Logan Stieber (38), Alex Dieringer (3), Isaiah Martinez (1), Nick Gwiazdowski (1)
2014	David Taylor	165	Penn State	David Taylor (38), Logan Stieber (3), Ed Ruth (2), Chris Perry (2), Alex Dieringer
2013	Kyle Dake	165	Cornell	Kyle Dake (39), Ed Ruth (4), Jordan Oliver, Logan Stieber
2012	David Taylor	165	Penn State	David Taylor, Ed Ruth, Kyle Dake, Frank Molinaro, Cam Simaz, Matt McDonough
2011	Jordan Burroughs	165	Nebraska	Jordan Burroughs, Jordan Oliver, Anthony Robles, Jon Reader, Kellen Russell
2010	Jayson Ness	133	Minnesota	Jayson Ness, Jake Varner, Jay Borschel
2009	Jake Herbert	184	Northwestern	Jake Herbert, Brent Metcalf, Jordan Burroughs, Jake Varner, Mike Pucillo
2008	Brent Metcalf	149	Iowa	Brent Metcalf, Keith Gavin, Mike Pucillo, Phil Davis, Angel Escobedo, Tervel Dlagnev, Dustin Fox
2007	Ben Askren	174	Missouri	Ben Askren, Cole Konrad, Jake Herbert, Derek Moore
2006	Ben Askren	174	Missouri	Ben Askren, Les Sigman, Nate Gallick, Cole Konrad, Ben Cherrington
2005	Steve Mocco	285	Oklahoma State	Steve Mocco, Greg Jones
2004	Emmett Willson	197	Montana State-Northern	Emmett Willson, Scott Moore, Matt Gentry, Greg Jones
2003	Eric Larkin	149	Arizona State	Eric Larkin, Matt Lackey, Steve Mocco, Travis Lee
2002	Cael Sanderson	197	Iowa State	Cael Sanderson, Stephen Abas
2001**	Nick Ackerman; Cael Sanderson	174; 184	Simpson College, Iowa State	Nick Ackerman, Cael Sanderson, Stephen Abas, Michael Lightner, T.J. Williams, Josh Koscheck
2000	Cael Sanderson	184	Iowa State	Cael Sanderson
1999	Stephen Neal	285	Cal State Bakersfield	Stephen Neal
1998	Mark Ironside	134	Iowa	Mark Ironside
1997	Kerry McCoy	285	Penn State	Kerry McCoy
1996	Les Gutches	177	Oregon State	Les Gutches
1995	T.J. Jaworsky	134	North Carolina	T.J. Jaworsky, Lincoln McIlravy, Joel Sharratt, Kerry McCoy

* Number of first place ballot votes from the Hodge Committee is indicated in parentheses

** In 2001 and 2021, the Dan Hodge Trophy was shared by two co-winners

== Junior Hodge Trophy Winners ==
Year	Recipient	School
2024	Luke Lilledahl	Wyoming Seminary (Pa.)
2023	Cael Hughes	Stillwater (Okla.)
2022	Nick Feldman	Malvern Prep (Pa.)
2021	Jesse Mendez	Crown Point (Ind.)
2020	Keegan O’Toole	Arrowhead (Hartland, Wisc.)
2019	Andrew Alirez	Greeley Central (Colo.)
2018	Gable Steveson	Apple Valley (Minn.)
2017	Daton Fix	Sand Springs (Okla.)
2016	Mark Hall	Apple Valley (Minn.)
2015	Zahid Valencia	St. John Bosco (Bellflower, Calif.)
2014	Chance Marsteller	Kennard-Dale (Fawn Grove, Pa.)
2013	Bo Jordan	Graham (St. Paris, Ohio)
2012	Jordan Rogers	Mead (Spokane, Wash.)
2011	Logan Storley	Webster (S.D.)
2010	Logan Stieber	Monroeville (Ohio)
2009	Chris Perry	Stillwater (Oklahoma)
2008	Jason Welch	Las Lomas (Walnut Creek, Calif.)
2007	Cody Gardner	Christianburg (Va.)
2006	David Craig	Brandon (Florida)
2005	Troy Nickerson	Chenango Forks (New York)
2004	Jeff Jaggers	St. Peter Chanel (Bedford, Ohio)
2003	Mark Perry	Blair Academy (Blairstown, N.J.)
2002	Teyon Ware	Edmond North (Oklahoma)
2001	Steve Mocco	Blair Academy (Blairstown, N.J.)
2000	Jesse Jantzen	Shoreham Wading River (New York)
1999	Damion Hahn	Lakewood (New Jersey)
1998	Shane Roller	Bixby (Oklahoma)

== See also ==
- National Wrestling Hall of Fame and Museum
