= Rob Koll =

American wrestler

Personal information
- Born: November 17, 1965 (age 60) State College, Pennsylvania, U.S.

Sport
- Country: United States
- Sport: Wrestling
- Event(s): Freestyle and Folkstyle
- College team: North Carolina
- Team: USA
Medal record
Men's freestyle wrestling
Representing the United States
Pan American Championships
Gold medal – first place	1989 Colorado Springs	74 kg
World Cup
Gold medal – first place	1993 Chattanooga	74 kg
Silver medal – second place	1992 Moscow	74 kg
Bronze medal – third place	1990 Toledo	74 kg
Collegiate Wrestling
Representing the North Carolina Tar Heels
NCAA Division I Championships
Gold medal – first place	1988 Ames	158 lb
Bronze medal – third place	1986 Iowa City	158 lb
Bronze medal – third place	1987 College Park	158 lb
ACC Championships
Gold medal – first place	1986 Raleigh	158 lb
Gold medal – first place	1987 Durham	158 lb
Gold medal – first place	1988 Charlottesville	158 lb

Rob Koll (born November 17, 1965) is an American college wrestling coach. He is currently head wrestling coach at University of North Carolina. He is the son of National Wrestling Hall of Fame member and three-time NCAA wrestling champion Bill Koll.

== Wrestling career ==
As a wrestler for the University of North Carolina, Koll was a four-time All American, three-time ACC champion, and the 1988 NCAA champion at 158 pounds. After college, he competed internationally in freestyle wrestling.

In 1989 he won gold at the Pan American Championships and was runner-up at the Olympic Festival; he won the U.S. national freestyle championship in 1990 and 1991; took first in the 1993 World Cup, while placing second in 1992 and third in 1990; placed fifth at the 1990 World Championships; won the 1992 World Cup Grand Prix; and was the alternate for the USA at the 1992 Olympic Games.

== Coaching career ==
Koll joined Cornell University as an assistant wrestling coach in 1989. He became head wrestling coach at the school in 1993. He led Cornell to six top-five finishes in the NCAA Division I wrestling tournament, including second-place finishes in 2010 and 2011. The 2010 and 2011 finishes were the best ever for an Ivy League team. The 2011 team was ranked first for much of the season, but lost in the NCAA tournament to Penn State, which surged under its coach Cael Sanderson, who was in his second year at Penn State.

Koll has coached the following NCAA champions:

- Yianni Diakomihalis – 2018 (141 lb), 2019 (141 lb)
- Gabe Dean – 2015 (184 lb), 2016 (184 lb)
- Nahshon Garrett – 2016 (133 lb)
- Kyle Dake – 2010 (141 lb), 2011 (149 lb), 2012 (157 lb), 2013 (165 lb)
- Steve Bosak – 2012 (184 lb)
- Cam Simaz – 2012 (197 lb)
- Troy Nickerson – 2009 (125 lb)
- Jordan Leen – 2008 (157 lb)
- Travis Lee – 2003 (125 lb), 2005 (133 lb)
- David Hirsch – 1994 (126 lb)

Koll has been won multiple coaching awards including Ivy League Coach of the Year (2015, 2016, 2017) and EIWA Coach of the Year (2007, 2010, 2011, 2017) and NWCA National Coach of the Year (2005).

He became head wrestling coach at Stanford University in 2021. In late August 2023, Koll accepted the head coaching position at his alma mater, the University of North Carolina at Chapel Hill.

== Personal life ==
Rob Koll was raised in State College, Pennsylvania. His father, Bill Koll, was a legendary three-time NCAA wrestling champion for Iowa State Teachers College (now the University of Northern Iowa) and a fifth-place finisher at the 1948 London Olympics. Bill later became the head coach at Penn State University, and from 1965-1978 he led the team to a 127-22-7 record.
