= Steve Mocco =

American Olympic wrestler and mixed martial arts fighter (born 1981)

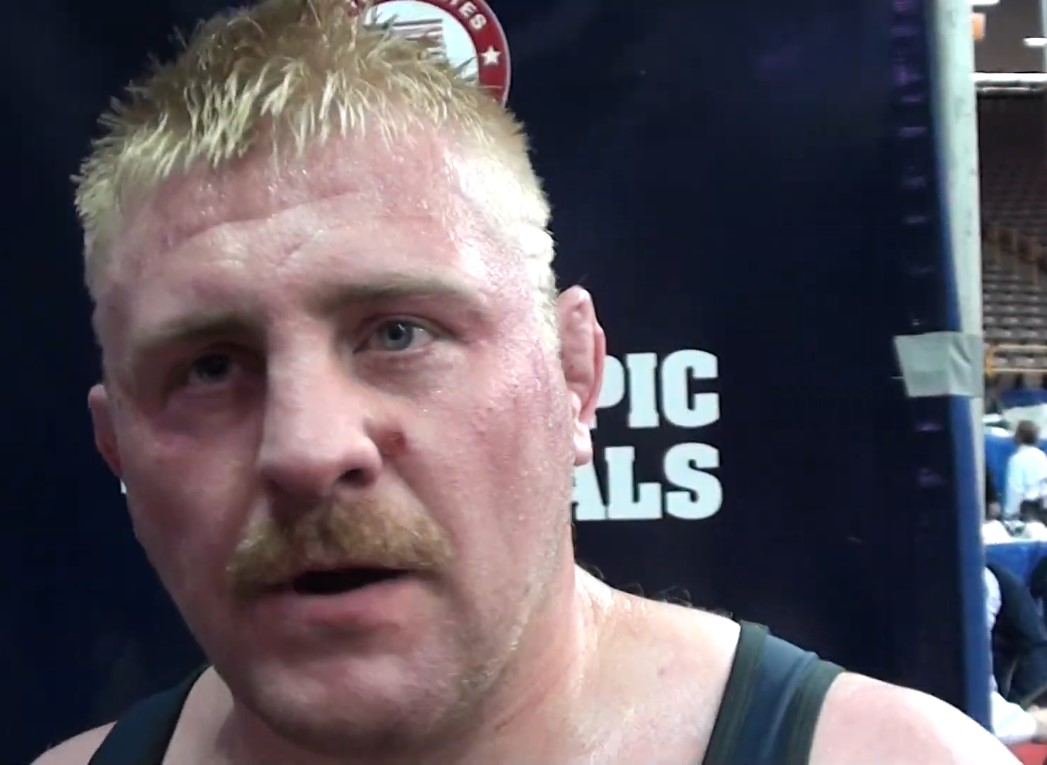
- Mocco in 2012
- Born: December 28, 1981 (age 44); North Bergen, New Jersey, U.S.
- Height: 6 ft 0 in (183 cm)
- Weight: 260 lb (118 kg; 18 st 8 lb)
- Division: Heavyweight (265 lbs)
- Reach: 75 in (191 cm)
- Style: Wrestling, Judo
- Fighting out of: Coconut Creek, Florida, U.S.
- Team: American Top Team
- Wrestling: NCAA Division I Wrestling; Olympic Freestyle Wrestling
- Years active: 2012–2015

Mixed martial arts record
- Total: 6
- Wins: 5
- By knockout: 1
- By submission: 3
- By decision: 1
- Losses: 1
- By decision: 1

Other information
- University: University of Iowa; Oklahoma State University
- Notable club: Mocco Wrestling Academy
- Notable school: Blair Academy
- Website: moccowrestling.com
- Mixed martial arts record from Sherdog
Medal record
Men's freestyle wrestling
Representing the United States
Pan American Championships
| Gold medal – first place | 2006 Rio de Janeiro | 120 kg |
| Gold medal – first place | 2009 Maracaibo | 120 kg |
| Gold medal – first place | 2011 Rio Negro | 120 kg |
Men's collegiate wrestling
Representing the Iowa Hawkeyes
NCAA Division I Championships
| Gold medal – first place | 2003 Kansas City | 285 lb |
| Silver medal – second place | 2002 Albany | 285 lb |
Big Ten Championships
| Gold medal – first place | 2003 Wisconsin | 285 lb |
| Silver medal – second place | 2002 Illinois | 285 lb |
Representing the Oklahoma State Cowboys
NCAA Division I Championships
| Gold medal – first place | 2005 St. Louis | 285 lb |
| Silver medal – second place | 2006 Oklahoma City | 285 lb |
Big 12 Championships
| Gold medal – first place | 2005 Ames | 285 lb |
| Gold medal – first place | 2006 Ames | 285 lb |

Steve Mocco (born December 28, 1981) is an American former amateur wrestler, judoka and mixed martial artist. As a collegiate wrestler, he was a two-time NCAA national champion, four-time finalist, and was awarded the Dan Hodge Trophy. In freestyle, he represented the US at the Olympics and was a three-time Pan American Champion. As an MMA fighter, he most notably competed at the WSOF. He is currently a coach at both combat sports, being one of the main coaches at MMA powerhouse American Top Team.

== High school career ==
As a high schooler, Mocco was one of the most dominant heavyweights in recent history. In folkstyle, he won two national prep titles while at St. Benedict's Prep and two more at powerhouse Blair Academy. In freestyle, he was a three-time Junior and one-time Cadet national champion.

He received multiple awards, including 2001 ASICS Tiger High School Wrestler of the Year, the 2001 Junior Dan Hodge Trophy winner, NHSCA National High School Wrestler of the Year, and Dave Schultz High School Excellence Award. He was one of the most sought-after recruits in history and committed to wrestle at Iowa for coach Jim Zalesky.

Mocco also competed in judo. In 1999, he placed first at the New York Open in the over 100 kg category, and third at the US National Championships in Spokane in the open category.

== College career ==
=== Iowa ===
Mocco arrived to University of Iowa as a true freshman in the 2001–2002 season. In his first year of competition, he earned runner-up honors at the 2002 NCAA's and Big Ten's and in his sophomore year he became the undefeated champion at the 2003 NCAA's and Big Ten's.

=== Oklahoma State ===
The next season (2003–2004), he took an Olympic redshirt to focus on training for the 2004 Summer Olympics (see section below).

After the Olympic redshirt and successful seasons at Iowa, he decided to transfer to Oklahoma State University.

In his first season competing as a Cowboy, he won the Big 12 Conference championship, the NCAA championship, and the Dan Hodge Trophy as the best collegiate wrestler in the country.

In his last season (2005–2006), he again won the Big 12 Conference championship but lost in the finals of the NCAA championships. He graduated with a 137–6 record.

In August 2006, with one year of college eligibility left, Mocco joined the Oklahoma State football team. As a senior defensive lineman, he played in five games for the Cowboys and was credited with two total tackles, one solo, according to the university's athletic web site.

=== Freestyle wrestling ===
Mocco is also an accomplished freestyle wrestler, he medaled at the US Senior Nationals from 2004 to 2009, competed at numerous US Team Trials, and won three Pan American Championships (2006, 2009, 2011). He is also a three-time Dave Schultz Memorial champion and four-time finalist.

In 2008, Mocco competed at the Summer Olympics, where he advanced to the quarterfinals and eventually placed seventh.

In 2009, he won championships at major world-wide tournaments, the Ivan Yarygin Memorial Golden Grand Prix and the Alexander Medved Invitational. He later won another gold medal at the Pan American Championships.

In 2011, he won another Pan American title and his third and final Dave Schultz Memorial championship.

After being unable to find further international success, he retired from the sport.

In 2019, Mocco was inducted into the National Wrestling Hall of Fame.

Mocco competed at RAF 05 on January 10, 2026, losing to Mostafa Elders.

== Mixed martial arts ==
Steve Mocco was brought into American Top Team to help Antônio Silva prepare for his fight with Cain Velasquez at UFC 146. He had a nice experience in training and was welcomed by American Top Team. After being unable to get past the national wrestling trials to enter the 2012 Olympics in London, Steve Mocco stayed at American Top Team and transitioned into mixed martial arts.

=== World Series of Fighting (PFL) ===
On January 17, 2014, it was announced that Mocco had signed a four-fight contract with World Series of Fighting.

Mocco faced Smealinho Rama at WSOF Canada 1 on February 21, 2014. He lost by unanimous decision. Mocco returned to the promotion following his first loss to face Juliano Coutinho on April 10, 2015, at WSOF 20. He won the fight via TKO in the first round.

Even though he never formally retired, Mocco has not competed since.

== Coaching ==
=== MMA ===
Mocco is the wrestling coach at the training center of multiple high-level fighters, American Top Team. There, he trains MMA fighters such as Junior dos Santos.

=== Wrestling ===
Mocco is the head coach and founder of the Mocco Wrestling Academy, where he teaches youth and collegiate wrestlers at the American Top Team facility. He is also an assistant coach of the wrestling team at Lehigh University.

== Championships and accomplishments ==
=== Freestyle wrestling ===
- United World Wrestling
  - 2011 Pan American Championship Gold Medalist
  - 2011 Dave Schultz Memorial International Gold Medalist
  - 2009 Pan American Championship Gold Medalist
  - 2009 Ivan Yarygin Golden Grand Prix Gold Medalist
  - 2009 Alexander Medved International Gold Medalist
  - 2008 Dave Schultz Memorial International Gold Medalist
  - 2007 Dave Schultz Memorial International Silver Medalist
  - 2006 Pan American Championship Gold Medalist
  - 2004 Dave Schultz Memorial International Gold Medalist
  - 2003 FILA Absolute Championship Silver Medalist
  - 2003 Sunkist Kids International Open Gold Medalist
- USA Wrestling
  - 2012 US Olympic Team Trials Bronze Medalist
  - 2011 US World Team Trials Silver Medalist
  - 2009 US World Team Trials Silver Medalist
  - 2009 US National Championships Gold Medalist
  - 2008 US Olympic Team Trials Gold Medalist
  - 2008 US National Championships Silver Medalist
  - 2007 US World Team Trials Silver Medalist
  - 2007 US National Championships Bronze Medalist
  - 2006 US National Championships Silver Medalist
  - 2005 US National Championships Silver Medalist
  - 2004 US National Championships Silver Medalist

=== Folkstyle wrestling ===
- National Collegiate Athletic Association
  - NCAA Division I All-American out of University of Iowa (2002, 2003)
  - NCAA Division I All-American out of Oklahoma State University (2005, 2006)
  - NCAA Division I 285 lb National Runner-up out of University of Iowa (2002)
  - NCAA Division I 285 lb National Championship out of University of Iowa (2003)
  - NCAA Division I 285 lb National Championship out of Oklahoma State University (2005)
  - NCAA Division I 285 lb National Runner-up out of Oklahoma State University (2006)
- Big Ten Conference
  - Big Ten 285 lb Conference Runner-up out of University of Iowa (2002)
  - Big Ten 285 lb Conference Championship out of University of Iowa (2003)
- Big 12 Conference
  - Big 12 285 lb Conference Championship out of Oklahoma State University (2005)
  - Big 12 285 lb Conference Championship out of Oklahoma State University (2006)

=== Mixed martial arts ===
- Fight Matrix
  - 2013 Male Rookie of the Year

== Mixed martial arts record ==
Professional record breakdown
| 6 matches | 5 wins | 1 loss |
| By knockout | 1 | 0 |
| By submission | 3 | 0 |
| By decision | 1 | 1 |

| Res. | Record | Opponent | Method | Event | Date | Round | Time | Location | Notes |
|---|---|---|---|---|---|---|---|---|---|
| Win | 5–1 | Juilano Coutinho | TKO (punches) | WSOF 20 | April 10, 2015 | 1 | 4:02 | Mashantucket, Connecticut, United States | |
| Loss | 4–1 | Smealinho Rama | Decision (unanimous) | WSOF Canada 1 | February 21, 2014 | 3 | 5:00 | Edmonton, Alberta, Canada | |
| Win | 4–0 | Alonzo Roane | Submission (arm-triangle choke) | Fight Time 17 - Undisputed | November 1, 2013 | 3 | 0:47 | Fort Lauderdale, Florida, United States | |
| Win | 3–0 | Lew Polley | Decision (unanimous) | RFA 9 - Munhoz vs. Curran | August 6, 2013 | 3 | 5:00 | Los Angeles, California, United States | |
| Win | 2–0 | Rashad Brooks | Submission (north-south choke) | Extreme Challenge | May 3, 2013 | 1 | 1:03 | Bettendorf, Iowa, United States | |
| Win | 1–0 | Tyler Perry | Submission (kimura) | RFA 4 - Griffin vs Escudero | November 2, 2012 | 2 | 1:34 | Las Vegas, Nevada, United States | |
