= Jake Herbert =

American freestyle wrestler

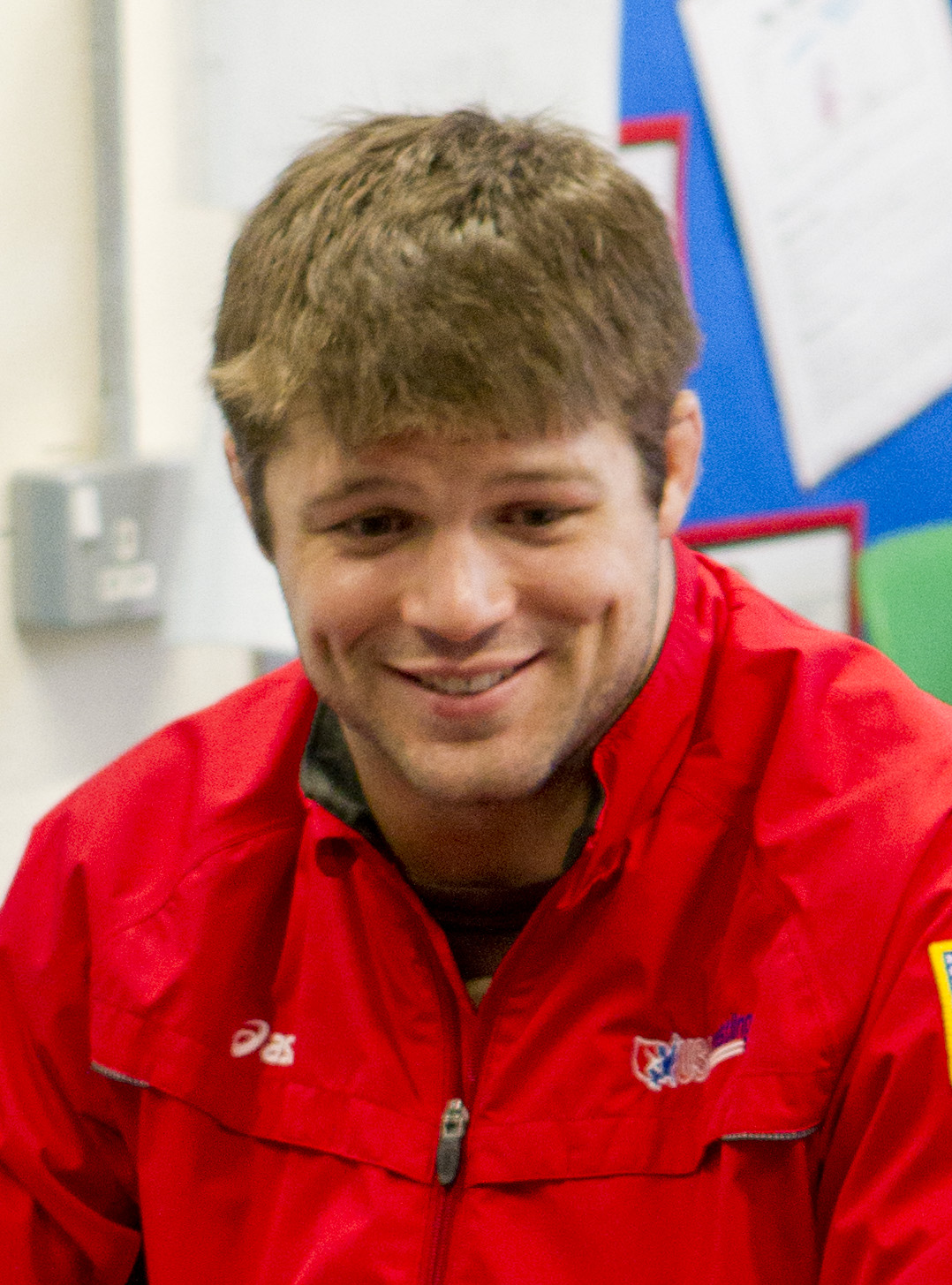
- Herbert in 2011

Personal information
- Born: March 6, 1985 (age 41) Pittsburgh, Pennsylvania, U.S.
- Education: Northwestern University
- Height: 6 ft 0 in (1.83 m)
- Weight: 185 lb (84 kg)

Sport
- Country: United States
- Sport: Freestyle wrestling
- Event: 84 kg
- College team: Northwestern Wildcats
- Club: Cliff Keen Wrestling Club
- Coached by: Sean Bormet
Medal record
Men's freestyle wrestling
Representing the United States
World Championships
Silver medal – second place	2009 Herning	84 kg
Pan American Games
Gold medal – first place	2011 Guadalajara	84 kg
Silver medal – second place	2015 Toronto	86 kg
University World Championships
Bronze medal – third place	2006 Oulan Bator	84 kg
Bronze medal – third place	2008 Thessaloniki	84 kg
Men's collegiate wrestling
Representing the Northwestern Wildcats
NCAA Division I Championships
Gold medal – first place	2007 Auburn Hills	184 lb
Gold medal – first place	2009 St. Louis	184 lb
Silver medal – second place	2006 Oklahoma City	174 lb

Jake Herbert (born March 6, 1985) is an American folkstyle and freestyle wrestler. Herbert won the 2012 U.S. Olympic Trials at 84 kg FS and competed in the 2012 Olympics.

== High school ==
Born in Pittsburgh, Herbert attended North Allegheny High School in Wexford, Pennsylvania, where he was a PIAA Class AAA state champion and four-time state placer.

== College ==
Herbert was a two-time NCAA champion, three-time Big Ten Conference champion, and four-time NCAA All-American. He went 149-4 while at Northwestern University. He won the 2009 Dan Hodge Trophy awarded to the best college wrestler in the nation and the 2009 Big Ten Athlete of the Year award.

== International ==
Herbert won a silver medal at the 2009 World Wrestling Championships at 84kg FS competed at the 2010 World Wrestling Championships at 84kg FS.

Herbert defeated Travis Paulson 2 to 1 at the finals of the 2012 U.S. Olympic Trials.

Herbert currently works with Andy Hrovat, who represented the United States at 84 kg FS in the 2008 Olympics.

Herbert came very close to obtaining a medal in the 2012 Olympics, but missed the opportunity due to a controversial referee's call.

== Personal life ==
He is the cousin of singer Josh Herbert. Jake has two daughters and a wife
