= 2006 NCAA Division I Wrestling Championships =

American collegiate wrestling tournament

Tournament information
- Sport: College wrestling
- Location: Oklahoma City, Oklahoma
- Host: Oklahoma State University
- Venue: Ford Center
- Participants: 68

Final positions
- Champions: Oklahoma State (34th title)
- 1st runners-up: Minnesota
- 2nd runners-up: Oklahoma
- MVP: Ben Askren (Missouri)

Oklahoma City hosted the 2006 NCAA Wrestling Team Championship from March 16–18, 2006. 64 teams vied for the NCAA team championship, and over 320 wrestlers competed for individual honors. Oklahoma State University crowned two individual champions (Johny Hendricks at 165 pounds and Jake Rosholt at 197 pounds) and four other Cowboys qualified as All-Americans as the Cowboys earned a dominant victory in the tournament. It was the 4th consecutive NCAA tournament victory by the Cowboys, and their 34th NCAA team wrestling championship overall.

== Team results ==
Rank	School	Points
1	Oklahoma State	122.5
2	Minnesota	84
3	Oklahoma	80.5
4	Iowa	70
5	Cornell	62
6	Arizona State	61.5
7	Michigan	57.5
8	Edinboro	56
9	Lehigh	53.5
9	Penn State	53.5
11	Hofstra	52.5
12	Penn	51
13	Iowa State	48.5
13	Northwestern	48.5
15	Missouri	45
16	Nebraska	40.5
17	American	40
18	Indiana	35
18	Michigan State	35
20	Purdue	34
21	Wisconsin	33.5
22	Oregon	33
23	Cal Poly	32
24	Boise State	31.5
25	Illinois	29
26	Central Michigan	26
27	West Virginia	23
28	Northern Iowa	20.5
29	Virginia Tech	18.5
30	Tennessee-Chattanooga	15
31	Harvard	14
31	North Carolina-Greensboro	14
33	The Citadel	13
34	Navy	12

Rank	School	Points
35	Pittsburgh	10
36	Northern Illinois	9
37	Stanford	8.5
37	Wyoming	8.5
39	Kent State	8
40	California-Davis	7
41	Army	6.5
41	Cal State-Fullerton	6.5
41	Oregon State	6.5
44	Columbia	6
45	Ohio State	5.5
46	Buffalo	5
47	Cal State-Bakersfield	4.5
49	North Carolina	4.5
49	Bloomsburg	4
49	Cleveland State	4
49	Eastern Illinois	4
49	Lock Haven	4
49	Slippery Rock	4
54	Fresno State	3
55	Gardner-Webb	2.5
55	Old Dominion	2.5
55	Duquesne	2.5
58	Drexel	2
58	Eastern Michigan	2
58	North Carolina State	2
61	Maryland	1
61	Rider	1
63	Sacred Heart	0.5
64	Air Force	0
64	Millersville	0
64	Brown	0
64	George Mason	0
64	James Madison	0

== Championship finals (with NCAA champions in bold) ==
Weight class	Championship Match (Champion in boldface)
125 lbs	**Joe Dubuque**, Indiana DEC Troy Nickerson, Cornell, 8–3
133 lbs	**Matt Valenti**, Penn DEC Christopher Fleeger, Purdue, 3–2
141 lbs	**Nate Gallick**, Iowa State DEC Teyon Ware, Oklahoma, 3–2
149 lbs	**Dustin Schlatter**, Minnesota DEC Tyler Eustice, Iowa, 4–0
157 lbs	**Ben Cherrington**, Boise State DEC Brian Stith, Arizona State, 7–3
165 lbs	**Johny Hendricks**, Oklahoma State DEC Ryan Churella, Michigan, 9–8
174 lbs	**Ben Askren**, Missouri MAJOR Jake Herbert, Northwestern, 14–2
184 lbs	**Shane Webster**, Oregon, DEC Roger Kish, Minnesota, 3–2
197 lbs	**Jake Rosholt**, Oklahoma State DEC Phil Davis, Penn State, 10–3
285 lbs	**Cole Konrad**, Minnesota DEC Steve Mocco, Oklahoma State, 5–2; TB2
