= Jack Spates =

Biographical details
- Born: July 20, 1952 (age 74); New York, New York

Playing career
- 1973–1975: Slippery Rock

Coaching career (HC unless noted)
- 1989–1993: Cornell
- 1994–2011: Oklahoma

Head coaching record
- Overall: 322–110–9 (.740)

Jack Spates (born July 20, 1952) is the former head wrestling coach at the University of Oklahoma, where he led the Sooners to seven top-10 finishes in the NCAA tournament and one Big 12 Conference championship. Prior to joining Oklahoma in 1993, Spates was the head coach at Cornell University and served as an assistant coach at the United States Military Academy and at the University of Pittsburgh. As a wrestler, Spates was the 1973 NCAA runner up at 118 pounds for Slippery Rock University. Spates retired at the conclusion of the 2010–11 season. Spates was born in New York City, but his family moved to Smithtown, New York, where he joined the wrestling team on a dare.

In 2011, Spates stepped down as head coach at the University of Oklahoma in order to pursue ministry. In 2014, Spates endorsed the book "Faith and Wrestling: How the Role of a Wrestler Mirrors the Christian Life" by author Michael Fessler, which in one of its chapters highlights Spates's life, wrestling and coaching career, and his Christian faith.
