= Wrestling at the 2015 Pan American Games – Men's freestyle 86 kg =

Men's Freestyle 86 kg at the 2015 Pan American Games
- Venue: Mississauga Sports Centre
- Dates: July 18
- Competitors: 8 from 8 nations

Medalists
Gold medal	Reineris Salas	Cuba
Silver medal	Jake Herbert	United States
Bronze medal	Tamerlan Tagziev	Canada
Bronze medal	Jaime Espinal	Puerto Rico

The men's freestyle 86 kg competition of the Wrestling events at the 2015 Pan American Games in Toronto were held on July 18 at the Mississauga Sports Centre.

== Schedule ==
All times are Eastern Daylight Time (UTC-4).

Date	Time	Round
July 18, 2015	14:53	Quarterfinals
July 18, 2015	15:38	Semifinals
July 18, 2015	20:27	Bronze medal matches
July 18, 2015	20:45	Final

== Results ==
=== Final ===
Quarterfinals		Semifinals		Finals
Tamerlan Tagziev (CAN)	4
Reineris Salas (CUB)	7	Reineris Salas (CUB)	7
Pool Ambrocio (PER)	10	Pool Ambrocio (PER)	1
Luis Miguel Pérez (DOM)	0			Reineris Salas (CUB)	12
Jake Herbert (USA)	11			Jake Herbert (USA)	7
Ricardo Báez (ARG)	0	Jake Herbert (USA)	10
Jaime Espinal (PUR)	8	Jaime Espinal (PUR)	0
Pedro Ceballos (VEN)	5

=== Repechage ===
Bronze medal match
Tamerlan Tagziev (CAN)	5
Pool Ambrocio (PER)	0
Ricardo Báez (ARG)	0
Jaime Espinal (PUR)	12
