= Travis Lee (wrestler) =

American wrestler (born 1983)

Medal record

Men's collegiate wrestling

Representing the Cornell Big Red

NCAA Division I Championships
Gold medal – first place	2003 Kansas City	125 lb
Gold medal – first place	2005 St. Louis	133 lb

EIWA Championships
Gold medal – first place	2002 Bethlehem	125 lb
Gold medal – first place	2003 Ithaca	125 lb
Gold medal – first place	2004 Philadelphia	133 lb
Gold medal – first place	2005 Annapolis	133 lb

Travis Lee (born 1983) is a former NCAA wrestler at the 125 lbs and 133 lbs weight class out of Cornell University. He competed for the Cornell Big Red wrestling team under coach Rob Koll. Lee was the first individual NCAA wrestling champion from Hawaii, winning the 125 lbs. title in 2003 and the 133 lbs. title in 2005.

== Background and wrestling career ==
Lee's first sport was judo, in which he won national junior titles. As a wrestler, he was a three-time Hawaii state champion and won Junior National titles in both freestyle and Greco-Roman wrestling.

His collegiate record was 143–13, the most wins of any Cornell wrestler at the time. He won the Eastern Intercollegiate Wrestling Association (EIWA) conference title four times, and was the Ivy League Rookie of the Year and a two-time Wrestler of the Year. He won the 2003 and 2005 NCAA Division I wrestling championships, losing in the semi-finals in 2004. Lee became the first native born Hawaiian to win an NCAA Division I wrestling title.

After college, Lee would wrestle freestyle on the Senior level. He came back from injury to win the Dave Schultz Memorial International in February 2007 with the New York Athletic Club. A further injury at the Independence Cup in Tashkent, Uzbekistan the following month led Lee to retire from wrestling.

== Personal life ==
Lee is from Liliha, Honolulu, Hawaii, and he graduated from Saint Louis School in Honolulu. He graduated in biological and environmental engineering from Cornell in 2005, and gained a master's degree in engineering in 2006. At Cornell, he was also a member of the Quill and Dagger society. After he graduated college, he helped coach the Cornell wrestling team and the Finger Lakes Wrestling Club.
