= 1988 NCAA Division I Wrestling Championships =

American collegiate wrestling tournament

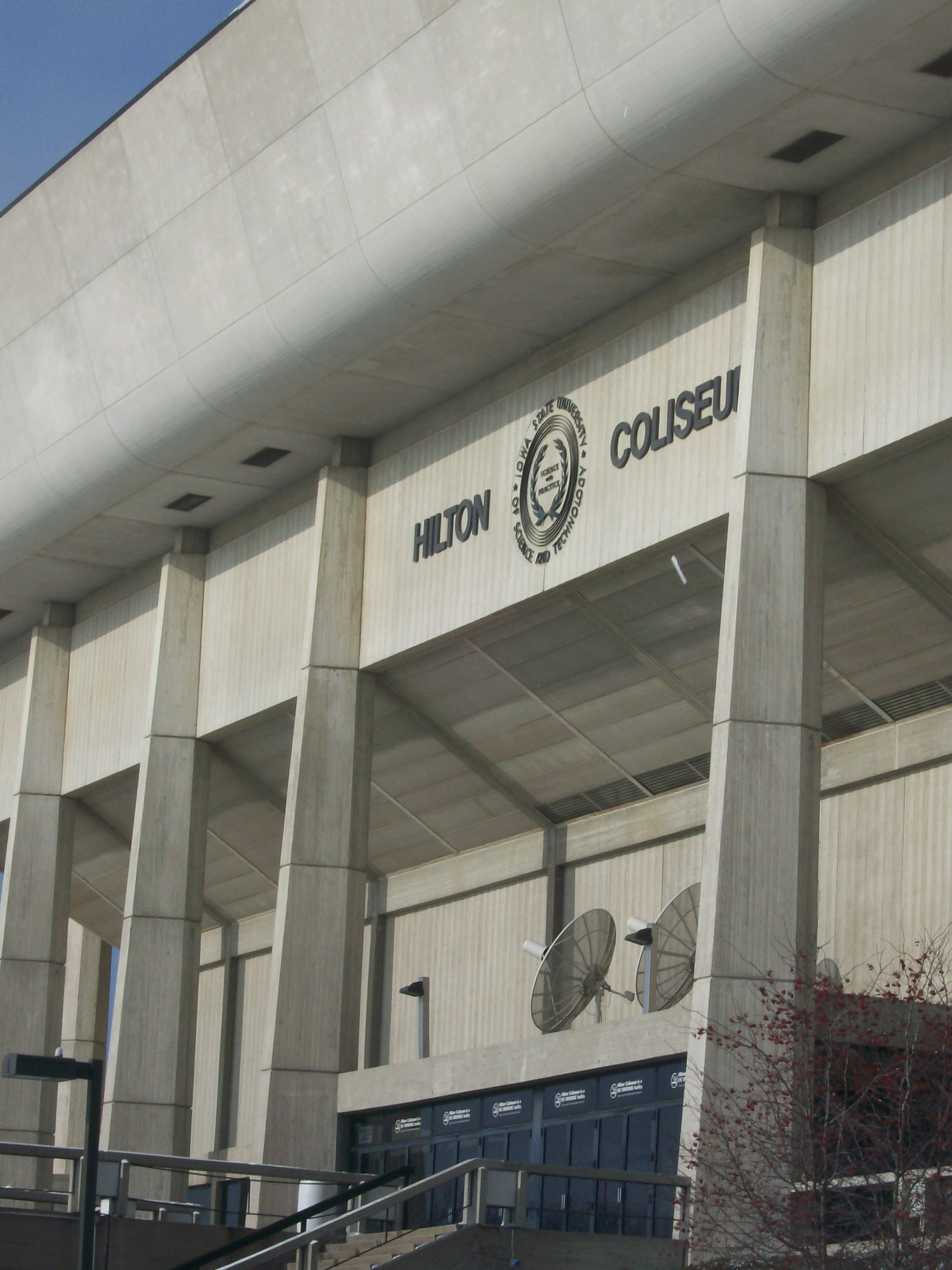

Tournament information
- Sport: College wrestling
- Location: Ames, Iowa
- Dates: March 17, 1988–March 19, 1988
- Host(s): Iowa State University
- Venue(s): Hilton Coliseum

Final positions
- Champions: Arizona State (1st title)
- 1st runners-up: Iowa
- 2nd runners-up: Iowa State
- MVP: Scott Turner (North Carolina State)

The 1988 NCAA Division I Wrestling Championships were the 58th NCAA Division I Wrestling Championships to be held. The Iowa State University in Ames, Iowa hosted the tournament at Hilton Coliseum.

Arizona State took home the team championship with 93 points despite having no individual champions.

Scott Turner of North Carolina State was named the Most Outstanding Wrestler and Eric Voelker of Iowa State received the Gorriaran Award.

== Team results ==
Rank	School	Points
1	Arizona State	93
2	Iowa	85.5
3	Iowa State	83.75
4	Oklahoma State	80.5
5	Penn State	71.5
6	Michigan	62.5
7	Edinboro	53.5
8	Oklahoma	45
9	Ohio State	39.75
10	North Carolina State	36

== Individual finals ==
Weight class	Championship match (champion in boldface)
118 lbs	**Jack Cuvo**, East Stroudsburg DEC Keith Nix, Minnesota, 11–4
126 lbs	**Jim Martin**, Penn State DEC Brad Penrith, Iowa, 5–4
134 lbs	**John Smith**, Oklahoma State DEC Joe Melchiore, Iowa, 9–2
142 lbs	**Pat Santoro**, Pittsburgh DEC Sean O'Day, Edinboro, 16–11
150 lbs	**Scott Turner**, North Carolina State DEC Tim Krieger, Iowa State, 1-1, 1–0
158 lbs	**Rob Koll**, North Carolina WBF Joe Pantaleo, Michigan, 1:14
167 lbs	**Mike van Arsdale**, Iowa State DEC Mike Amine, Michigan, 8–2
177 lbs	**Royce Alger**, Iowa DEC Dan Mayo, Penn State, 6–4
190 lbs	**Mark Coleman**, Ohio State DEC Mike Davies, Arizona State, 5–0
275 lbs	**Carlton Haselrig**, Pittsburgh-Johnstown MAJ Dave Orndorff, Oregon State, 12–2
