= J. Andrew Noel =

American sports administrator

Coaching career (HC unless noted)
- 1974–1988: Cornell

Administrative career (AD unless noted)
- 1999–2023: Cornell

J. Andrew Noel, Jr. is an American sports administrator.
