= Cornell Big Red wrestling =

Wrestling team of Cornell University

- University: Cornell University
- Head coach: Mike Grey
- Assistant coach: Yianni Diakomihalis
- Conference: EIWA
- Location: Ithaca, NY
- Arena: Friedman Wrestling Center (capacity: 1,100)
- Nickname: Big Red
- Colors: Carnelian red and white

The Cornell Big Red wrestling team represents Cornell University of Ithaca, New York in collegiate wrestling. It is one of the most successful and storied collegiate wrestling programs in the nation with over 20 individual NCAA champions, 44 Ivy League championships, and 28 Eastern Intercollegiate Wrestling Association championships since the program's 1907 founding.

Since 2021, the Cornell wrestling team has been coached by two-time NCAA All-American and former Cornell wrestler Mike Grey, who took over for Rob Koll, who left for Stanford after 28 years as head coach. Koll led the team to eight top-five finishes in the NCAA Division I wrestling tournament, including second-place finishes in 2010 and 2011. The 2010 and 2011 finishes were the best ever for an Ivy League team. In 2012, Cornell wrestling finished fourth in the NCAA tournament, while crowning three individual national champions Kyle Dake (157 lbs), Steve Bosak (184 lbs) and Cam Simaz (197 lbs). This was the first time in program history when there were multiple national champions (3) in the same year. Additionally, Kyle Dake went on to become the only wrestler in U.S. history to capture four individual national championships in four different weight classes (141 lbs, 149 lbs, 157 lbs & 165 lbs).

Outside of the NCAA tournament, Cornell has been Ivy League champion a record 44 times and was league champion for 17 consecutive seasons between 2003 and 2019. During that streak the team won 92 consecutive Ivy League dual meets. Cornell has won the Eastern Intercollegiate Wrestling Association championship 28 times, including 11 consecutive titles between 2007 and 2017. These streaks remain the longest in wrestling history for their respective divisions.

In December 2023 the Ivy League announced that beginning with the 2024-2025 academic year the league would hold its own post-season tournament and would no longer be a part of the EIWA.

== History ==
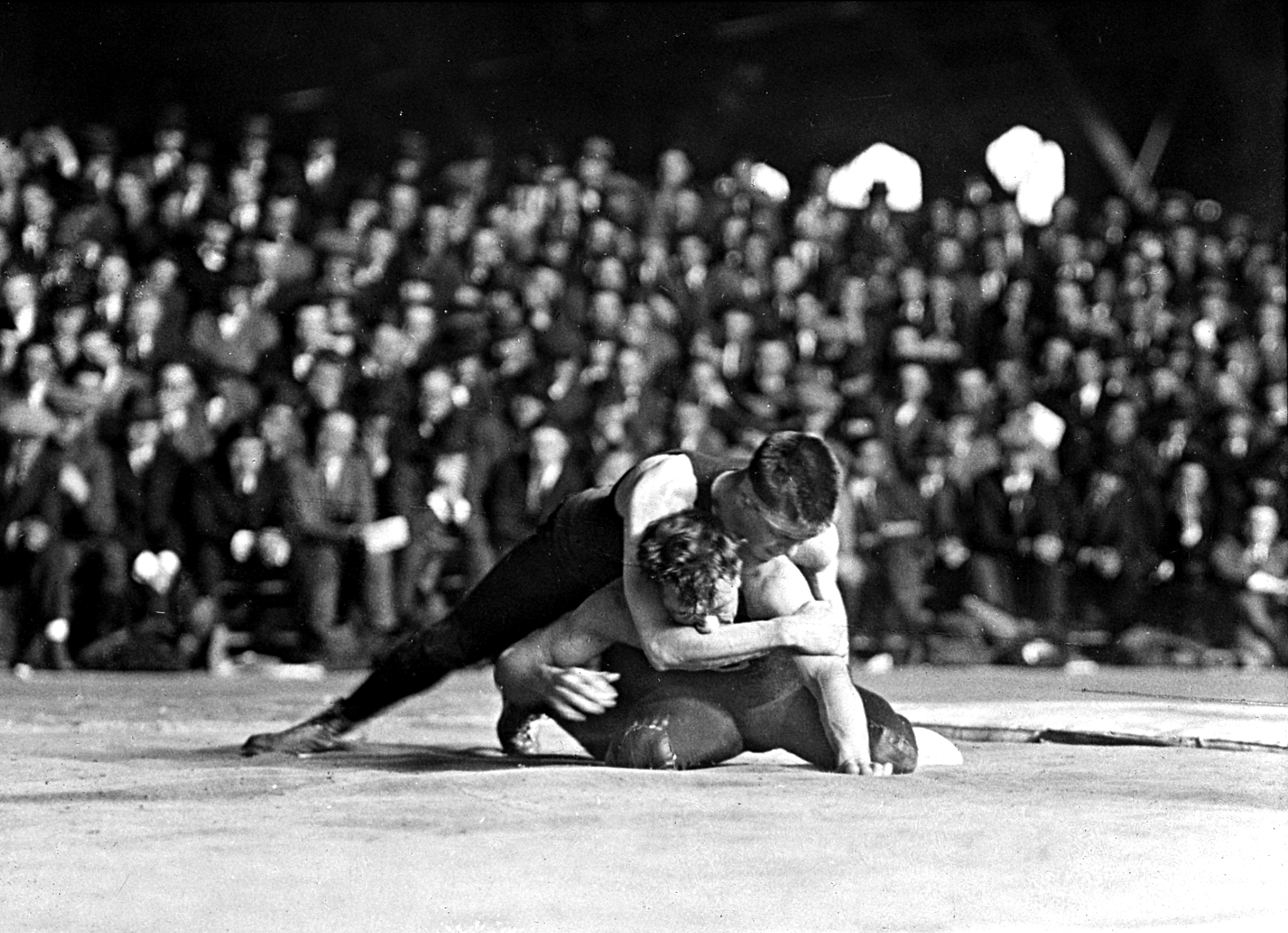
Cornell wrestling meet in New York State Drill Hall, now Barton Hall, in March 1923

In 1907, E.J. O'Connell became the first coach in Cornell wrestling history. He led the team for two seasons with back-to-back winning records as well as a third-place finish at the Eastern Intercollegiate Wrestling Association meet in 1907. Walter O'Connell became the next head coach and began a historic 39-year career. Under his direction, Cornell won 11 titles and had 63 individual winners at the EIWA Championships. In 1919, Charles Ackerly won the EIWA Championships at 115 lbs. Ackerly then competed for the United States in the 1920 Summer Olympics in Belgium, where he won the gold medal in the same weight class. Cornell also saw its first national champion under O'Connell as Glen Stafford won the individual national title in 1928 at 175 lbs.

In 1947, Jimmy Miller took over as head coach and led the Big Red to 203 dual meet wins in his 27-year tenure. Cornell crowned two national champions in 1953, Frank Bettucci (147 lbs) and Donald Dickason (167 lbs). Three years later, Bettucci was able to win matches at the 1956 Olympic Trials, though he did not qualify. In 1960 and 1961, David Auble won back-to-back national championships, which allowed him to compete for the U.S. in the 1964 Summer Olympics in Tokyo (he placed fourth). Carmon Molino also competed for Miller and the Big Red and was an alternate on the 1964 U.S. Wrestling Team in Tokyo. Molino later became assistant coach for Cornell from 1967 to 1972 and again from 1974 to 1992.

J. Andrew Noel took over as head coach in 1974. In his 14 years, Noel led Cornell wrestling to four Ivy League Championships. During this time, Cornell wrestling grew its network and visibility both in the town of Ithaca and the college wrestling world. Jack Spates became head coach in 1988 and led the team to five straight Ivy League Championships before leaving his post for the University of Oklahoma. In these five years, Cornell wrestling posted a .837 winning percentage and a record of 74-14-1.

Rob Koll began his tenure as head coach of the Big Red in 1993 and held it until leaving for the head coaching position at Stanford University in 2021. Koll represented an era of Cornell wrestling that reached unprecedented success including 19 Ivy League Championships (including 16 consecutive between 2003 and 2018), 11 Eastern Intercollegiate Wrestling Association Championships, 15 individual national champions, and 14 top ten finishes in the NCAA. In 1994, David Hirsch won the 126-pound title at the NCAA Championships. He also won a career high 41 matches in his senior season and was a three-time first-team All-Ivy pick. Koll also coached dominant Cornell wrestler Travis Lee, who won the national title at two different weight classes: 126-pound in 2003 and 133-pound in 2005. Lee was Cornell's first four-time All-American and four-time Eastern Intercollegiate Wrestling Association champion.

The Friedman Wrestling Center, the nation’s only stand-alone facility devoted solely to collegiate wrestling, was opened in 2002. Facilities include a strength and conditioning center, training room, locker room, lounge, a state-of-the-art sound and lighting system, and the Arno P. Niemand Arena. The arena features 6,300 square feet of mat space.

Cornell won 17 consecutive Ivy League Championships between 2003 and 2019. In 2005, Cornell had four All-Americans for the first time in team history. Rob Koll was also named the National Wrestling Coaches Association's Division I Coach of the Year. In 2007, Cornell wrestling won its first Eastern Intercollegiate Wrestling Association championship since 1993 and advanced eight wrestlers to the NCAA tournament. Jordan Leen added to Cornell's list of national champions, winning the title at the 149 lb weight class in 2008. Troy Nickerson also won the national title the next year at the 125 lb class. Cornell finished a school-best 2nd place at the NCAA Championships in 2010 and crowned freshman Kyle Dake national champion in the 141 lb weight class.

The 2010-2011 season was a stand out performance by the Big Red. The squad won its ninth straight Ivy League Championship and fifth consecutive Eastern Intercollegiate Wrestling Association Championship. Up to this point, much of the wrestling world has been dominated by Oklahoma State and Iowa. However, after the end of the regular season in 2011, Cornell was ranked first followed by Iowa, Oklahoma State and Penn State. The team eventually finished second in the NCAA tournament, but Kyle Dake was able to repeat as national champion in the higher weight class of 149 lbs.

In 2012, Cornell crowned three national champions for the first time in program history. Junior Kyle Dake made his own history by winning his third national title in three separate weight classes (this year at 157 lbs). Steve Bosak and Cam Simaz each won national titles at the 184 lb and 197 lb weight classes respectively. The team finished fourth in the NCAA tournament. This year also marked 5 All-Americans for the Big Red, a 10th consecutive Ivy League Championship and sixth consecutive EIWA Championship.

Other national champions under Koll were Gabe Dean (2015 and 2016 at 184), Nahshon Garrett (2016 at 133) and Yianni Diakomihalis (2018 and 2019 at 141).

For the 2021-22 season, former assistant Mike Grey was hired to replace Koll as head coach for the Big Red. In his first season at the helm, Cornell regained the EIWA and Ivy league titles and finished in 7th place at the NCAA tournament. The team finished with three All-Americans, including Yianni Diakomihalis, who won his third national title, this time at 149.

== Coaches ==
E.J. O'Connell
O'Connell was the first head coach in Cornell wrestling history. Under his leadership, the team finished in third place at the Eastern Intercollegiate Wrestling Association 1907 meet.

Walter O'Connell
O'Connell took over as coach in 1908 and served for a historic 39 years until 1947. His successes included 24 top three EIWA finishes and winning the unofficial national championship in 1910, 1912, and 1923. He is a member of the EIWA Hall of Fame.

Jimmy Miller
Miller was head coach of Cornell wrestling from 1947 to 1974. Under his leadership, the team amassed 203 dual meet wins, the most wins by a coach in Cornell history at the time. He was named head coach of the U.S. Wrestling Team in the 1967 Pan American Games.

Andy Noel
Noel served as head coach of Cornell wrestling from 1974 to 1988. During his tenure, Cornell Wrestling won the Ivy League Championships four times. Noel was appointed director of athletics at Cornell University in 1999, succeeding Charles Moore. Noel is a native of Lancaster, PA and a 1972 graduate of Franklin and Marshall College where he received his bachelor of arts degree in art history. Noel was inducted into the New York State Wrestling Hall of Fame in 1992. He is also a member of the Franklin and Marshall Athletics Hall of Fame and the Eastern Intercollegiate Wrestling Association Hall of Fame.

Jack Spates
Spates became head coach of Cornell wrestling in 1988 after serving as head assistant coach for the U.S. Military Academy at West Point. He led Cornell to five straight Ivy League Championships and nine individual champions before leaving the program for the University of Oklahoma. Spates graduated from Slippery Rock University, where he became the individual NCAA national champion in 1973. He retired as head coach of the Oklahoma Sooners following the 2010-2011 season.

Rob Koll
Koll became the head coach of the Cornell Big Red in 1993 after four years as an assistant. He became Cornell's winningest coach in 2011, surpassing coach Jimmy Miller's record. Under Koll's direction, Cornell has seen 19 Ivy League Championships and crowned 15 national champions. He is a native of State College, PA and a 1989 graduate of the University of North Carolina where he was an accomplished wrestler. Koll became a national champion for UNC in 1989 as well as becoming the university's first four time All-American. At Cornell, Koll led the team to four NCAA team trophies, including second place finishes in 2010 and 2011. He left to become the head coach at Stanford University in 2021.

Mike Grey
Grey was promoted to head coach in 2021 upon Koll's departure. Grey joined the Cornell coaching staff as a volunteer assistant after graduating from the school in 2011. While wrestling for the Big Red, Grey was a 2x All-American and 2x Ivy League champion at 133. Over the next decade, he climbed the coaching ladder, becoming an assistant coach in 2013 and associate head coach in 2019. Prior to Cornell, Grey became New Jersey's first 4-time state champion while wrestling for Delbarton. In 2023, he led Cornell to its first NCAA tournament team trophy under his tenure, placing third. He was named the tournament Coach of the Year.

== National champions ==
- 1929 Glenn Stafford, 175 lb.
- 1953 Frank Bettucci, 147 lb.
- 1953 Don Dickason, 167 lb.
- 1959 Dave Auble, 123 lb.
- 1960 Dave Auble, 123 lb.
- 1994 David Hirsch, 126 lb.
- 2003 Travis Lee, 125 lb.
- 2005 Travis Lee, 133 lb.
- 2008 Jordan Leen, 157 lb.
- 2009 Troy Nickerson, 125 lb.
- 2010 Kyle Dake, 141 lb.
- 2011 Kyle Dake, 149 lb.
- 2012 Kyle Dake, 157 lb.
- 2012 Steve Bosak
- 2012 Cam Simaz
- 2013 Kyle Dake, 165 lb. (Dake first wrestler ever in NCAA history to win four titles in four different weight classes)
- 2015 Gabe Dean, 184 lb.
- 2016 Nahshon Garrett, 133 lb.
- 2016 Gabe Dean, 184 lb.
- 2018 Yianni Diakomihalis, 141 lb.
- 2019 Yianni Diakomihalis 141 lb.
- 2022 Yianni Diakomihalis, 149 lb.
- 2023 Vito Arujau, 133 lb.
- 2023 Yianni Diakomihalis, 149 lb. (Diakomiahlis the 5th wrestler to win 4 titles, Cornell the first school with two 4x champions)
- 2024 Vito Arujau, 133 lb.

== Team marketing and fundraising ==
Under Rob Koll's direction, Cornell Wrestling has been marketed through some of the most notable newspapers and wrestling sites including The New York Times, USA Today, The Wall Street Journal, The Cornell Daily Sun, Ithaca Journal, themat.com, wrestlingreport.com, flowrestling.com, YouTube, Facebook, Twitter and many more. With over 14,000 likes on Facebook and nearly 4,000 Twitter followers, Cornell Wrestling remains one of the most followed Division-1 wrestling programs in the country. Koll accomplishes this through a number of means; however, as of fall in 2010 he invented an unofficial wrestling mascot known as Redman. While the mascot for Cornell University is the Big Red Bear, Koll felt the need to create a mascot solely for the wrestling team. His appearance is representative of the sport itself, wearing red spandex's covering from head to toe, coupled with a white Cornell Wrestling singlet. Additional attributes include: sunglasses, Cornell C tattoo, wrestling shoes and wrestling headgear. Although Redman's identity remains secret, he promotes the program through his acrobatic dance moves at wrestling events. Koll specifically markets wrestling matches using Redman in commercials posted on Facebook and YouTube. In November 2010, The Cornell Daily Sun interviewed Redman asking him 10 questions about his originality and purpose.

== Facilities ==
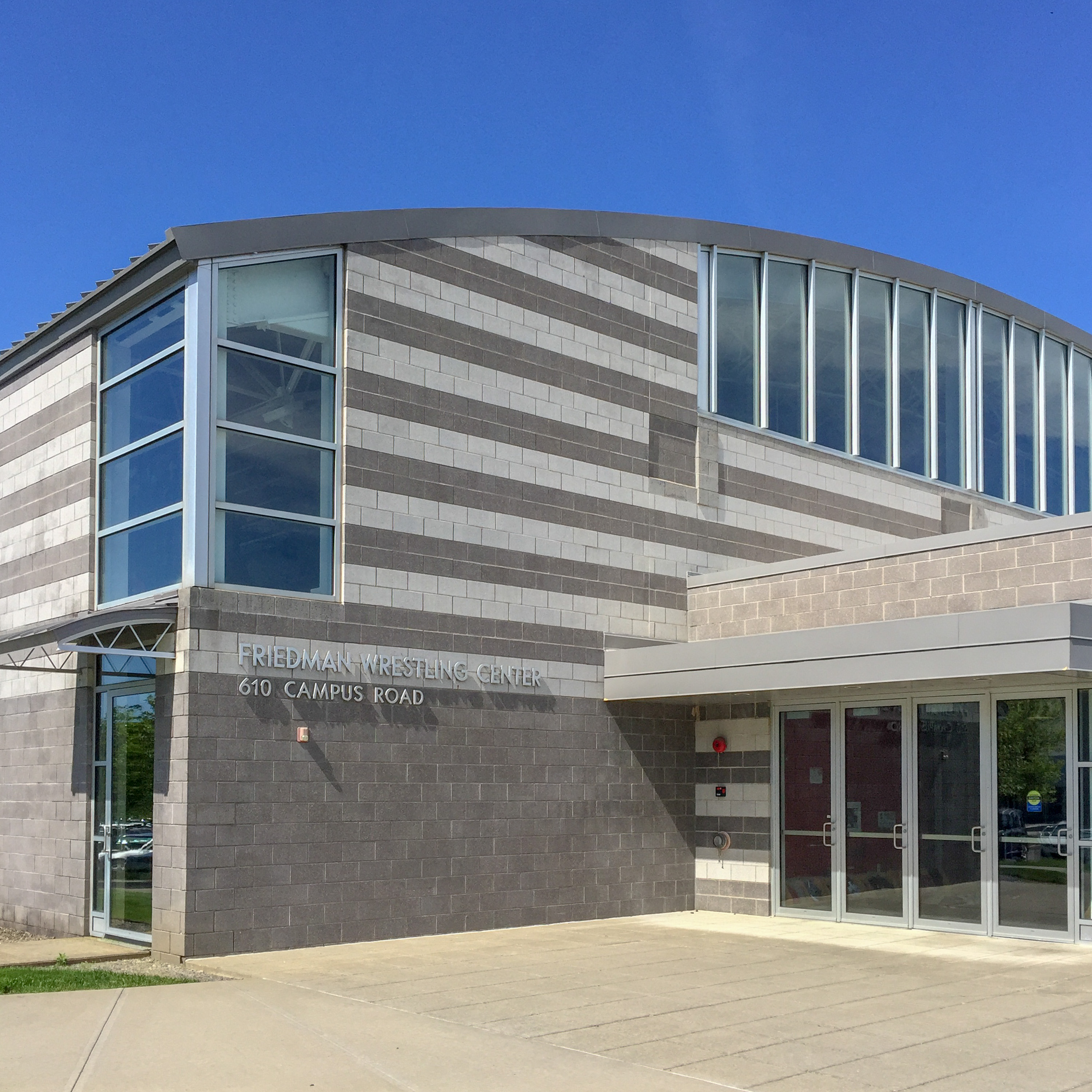
Friedman Wrestling Center at Cornell University, which opened in 2002, is the nation’s only stand-alone facility devoted solely to college wrestling.

The Friedman Center is the home of Cornell Wrestling. The first arena in the nation built solely for wrestling, the Friedman Center opened in November 2002 on Campus Road. Named for alumnus Stephen Friedman and trustee Barbara Benioff Friedman, the 15,000-square-foot building was designed by CannonDesign with state-of-the-art training and weight rooms with custom-designed weight machines. It features a 1,000-seat arena, a student lounge, and locker rooms. The arena floor was specially designed with "extra yield" for wrestling matches.

== Olympians ==
Cornell wrestlers in the Olympics
Year	Name	Country	Style	Weight Class	Place
1908 London	Lee Talbott	United States	Freestyle	+73 kg	9th
1920 Antwerp	Charles Ackerly	United States	Freestyle	60 kg	Gold
1924 Paris	Charles MacWilliam	United States	Freestyle	56 kg	9th
1924 Paris	Walter Wright	United States	Freestyle	79 kg	11th
1964 Tokyo	Dave Auble	United States	Freestyle	57 kg	4th
1964 Tokyo	Phil Oberlander	Canada	Freestyle	78 kg	6th
2020 Tokyo	Kyle Dake	United States	Freestyle	74 kg	Bronze
2024 Paris	Kyle Dake	United States	Freestyle	74 kg	Bronze

== Notable Cornell wrestlers ==
- Charles Ackerly – Olympic gold medalist in freestyle wrestling at 1920 Summer Olympics
- Vito Arujau – 2023 World Champion in freestyle wrestling (61kg) for Team USA; 2x NCAA Wrestling Champion and 4x NCAA All-American
- David Auble – Olympian at 1964 Summer Olympics in freestyle wrestling, 2X NCAA Wrestling Champion
- Kyle Dake – Olympic bronze medalist at the 2020 Summer Olympics and 2024 Summer Olympics in freestyle wrestling (74kg) for Team USA; 4x World Champion; 4x NCAA Wrestling Champion and only wrestler to win four times in four different weight classes
- Gabe Dean – 2x NCAA Wrestling Champion and 4X All-American; freestyle and Greco-Roman wrestler for Team USA
- Joe DeMeo – head coach of several USA Wrestling World Teams
- Yianni Diakomihalis – 2022 World silver medalist in freestyle wrestling (65kg) for Team USA; 2x Cadet World Champion; 4x NCAA Wrestling Champion
- Stephen Friedman – EIWA champion, former chairman of the U.S. President's Intelligence Advisory Board and former chair of the Federal Reserve Bank of New York
- Nahshon Garrett – NCAA Wrestling Champion and 4x All-American
- Travis Lee – 2x NCAA Wrestling Champion and 4x All-American
- Troy Nickerson – NCAA Wrestling Champion and 4x All-American
- Phil Oberlander – Olympian at 1964 Summer Olympics in freestyle wrestling
- Cam Simaz – NCAA Wrestling Champion and 4x All-American
