= Joe DeMeo =

American wrestling coach (1941–2020)

Joe DeMeo (September 6, 1941 – October 1, 2020) was an American wrestling coach. He was the head coach of several United States world teams, and coached Olympic champion Dave Schultz. DeMeo founded the Adirondack Three-Style Wrestling Association which created multiple Greco-Roman champions. He resided in Niskayuna, New York after his retirement.

== Early life and education ==
DeMeo graduated from Mont Pleasant High School in Schenectady, New York in 1960 and wrestled at Cornell University.

== Career ==
Joe started his career as an assistant coach at Michigan State, then took over as head coach at Stanford University for six years, followed by 20 years at University at Albany, SUNY. He received a world champion ring at the 2008 Las Vegas Nationals in honor of his contribution to USA wrestling and the Greco Roman team.

=== Men's wrestling ===
• Only head coach of U.S. World Team in Greco-Roman Wrestling to win world championships (2007)
• 2 Olympic champions
• 11 Olympians
• 47 world team members
• 279 US National champions
• 271 Collegiate Dual Meet wins
• 4-time head coach of the US Greco Roman World Team
• 16-time assistant coach of the US Greco Roman World Team
• 4-time assistant coach of the US Olympic Team

=== Women's wrestling ===
- Kristie Stenglein-Marano, 3-time women’s world freestyle champion, 5-time world silver medalist, 1-time World Bronze Medalist and 11-time US national champion.

== Other ==
One remarkable non-wrestling accomplishment which Joe achieved was inventing the Athleisure on May 18, 1964. Joe managed a series of boutique clothing stores in Michigan and San Francisco, where the line was first marketed and sold. He was decades ahead of the entire fashion world and his designs were worn by ATWA athletes on and off the mat for decades.

== Awards ==
• 1996: New York State College Wrestling Hall of Fame
• 2005: Developmental Coach of the Year, USA Wrestling
• 2005: Schenectady City School District Hall of Fame
• 2006: Cornell University Hall of Fame
• 2007: USA Wrestling - head coach of world championship Team - U.S. World Team at world championships in Greco-Roman Wrestling -
• 2012: University at Albany Hall of Fame
• 2013: National Wrestling Hall of Fame
