= Cam Simaz =

American wrestler

Personal information
- Born: January 21, 1989 (age 37) Allegan, Michigan, U.S.

Sport
- Sport: Wrestling
- Event(s): Freestyle and Folkstyle
- College team: Cornell
- Club: Finger Lakes Wrestling Club
Medal record
Men's collegiate wrestling
Representing the Cornell Big Red
NCAA Division I Championships
| Gold medal – first place | 2012 St. Louis | 197 lb |
| Bronze medal – third place | 2010 Omaha | 197 lb |
| Bronze medal – third place | 2011 Philadelphia | 197 lb |

Cameron Albert Simaz (born January 21, 1989) is a graduated collegiate wrestler from Allegan, Michigan. He captured the NCAA Championship in 2012 at 197 pounds for the Cornell Big Red wrestling Program. Simaz is a competing member of the Association of Career Wrestlers. In 2018, Simaz joined the coaching staff at South Dakota State University.

== College career ==
=== Awards ===
- NCAA Champion (2012)
- All-American (2009, 2010, 2011, 2012)
- NCAA Qualifier (2009, 2010, 2011, 2012)
- EIWA Champion (2009, 2010, 2011, 2012)
- EIWA Finalist (2009, 2010, 2011, 2012)
- EIWA Tournament Coaches' Award (Most Outstanding Wrestler) (2012)
- EIWA Tournament Fletcher Award Winner (2012)
- EIWA Freshman of the Year (2009)
- Ivy League Wrestler of the Year (2011, 2012)
- Ivy League Rookie of the Year (2009)
- First-Team All-Ivy (2009, 2010, 2011, 2012)
- NWCA All-Academic Team (2010, 2011)
