= Nate Gallick =

American wrestler (born 1983)

Personal information
- Born: February 10, 1983 (age 43) Tucson, Arizona, U.S.

Sport
- Sport: Wrestling
- Event(s): Freestyle and Folkstyle
- College team: Iowa State Cyclones
Medal record
Men's freestyle wrestling
Representing the United States
University World Championships
Gold medal – first place	2005 Izmir	60 kg
Men's collegiate wrestling
Representing the Iowa State Cyclones
NCAA Division I Championships
Gold medal – first place	2006 Oklahoma City	141 lb
Silver medal – second place	2005 St. Louis	141 lb

Nathan "Nate" Gallick (born February 10, 1983) is an American NCAA champion, a two-time NCAA finalist and a three-time All-American for the Iowa State Cyclones. Gallick also won two Midlands titles and three Big 12 Conference championships. Additionally, he was a U.S. Senior national champion, a four-time U.S. national team member, and finished third at the 2008 U.S. Olympic Team Trials.

== Biography ==
Nate Gallick was a wrestler at Sunnyside High School in Tucson, Arizona, where he won two Arizona state championships. He competed at 119 pounds in 2000 and 125 pounds in 2001. Gallick graduated from Iowa State University, where as a wrestler he was a three-time All-American, two-time NCAA finalist and the 2006 NCAA champion at 141 lbs.

In 2006, Gallick was named the Outstanding Wrestler at the 73rd Big 12 Wrestling Tournament.

After his competitive career, Gallick served as a coach alongside Chris Bono at the University of Tennessee at Chattanooga for two seasons and was a volunteer assistant coach for Kevin Jackson at Iowa State in 2009.
