= Joe Heskett =

Joe Heskett is an American former freestyle wrestler and member of the National Wrestling Hall of Fame and Museum.

== High school career ==
He wrestled at Walsh Jesuit High School. There he was a 2-time Most Outstanding Wrestler at the Walsh Jesuit Ironman and was a 3-time OHSAA state champion.

== College career ==
Heskett was a national champion and 4-time All American with Iowa State Cyclones wrestling.

== International career ==
Heskett represented the United States at the 2007 World Wrestling Championships at 74kg and won silver at the 2007 Pan American Games.
