= Troy Nickerson =

American wrestler and coach (born 1987)

Personal information
- Born: January 7, 1987 (age 39) Binghamton, New York, U.S.

Sport
- Sport: Wrestling
- Event(s): Freestyle and Folkstyle
- College team: Cornell
Medal record
Men's collegiate wrestling
Representing the Cornell Big Red
NCAA Division I Championships
Gold medal – first place	2009 St. Louis	125 lb
Silver medal – second place	2006 Oklahoma City	125 lb
Bronze medal – third place	2007 Auburn Hills	125 lb

Troy Nickerson (born January 7, 1987) is a former wrestler and NCAA champion out of Cornell University. He is the current head wrestling coach at the Army West Point.

== High school career ==
Nickerson attended Chenango Forks High School in Chenango Forks, New York. At Chenango Forks, Nickerson became the first five-time high school state champion of New York State and amassed a record of 217-6, while winning several Junior National championships. Intermat wrestling named him the ninth best high school wrestler for the entire 20-year period ending in 2005. Nickerson was also named the Junior Hodge Trophy winner in 2005. At the Fargo tournament, a national championship tournament in the U.S. for freestyle and Greco-Roman wrestling, he captured five titles in six tries.

== College career ==
After graduating from high school Nickerson attended Cornell University, where he won three EIWA wrestling titles and was a rare four-time NCAA All-American. In his junior year, Nickerson won the 2009 NCAA wrestling title at 125 pounds. He finished 2nd as a true freshman, 3rd as a sophomore, and 4th as a senior with a total career record of 97-8. He served as captain during his senior year and was also a member of the Quill and Dagger society.

== Coaching career ==
In September 2010, Nickerson accepted a position as an assistant coach for the Finger Lakes Wrestling Club of New York, which focuses on promoting all levels of wrestling in New York State.

In 2011 and 2012, Nickerson competed in freestyle wrestling on the senior level, with his goal of making the U.S. Olympic team. He would not make the 2012 U.S. Olympic Trials and afterwards would turn his full attention to coaching. In 2012, he was hired as an assistant coach at Iowa State. In 2014, Nickerson was named head coach of the University of Northern Colorado wrestling program.

Nickerson was named the head coach at Army West Point on June 9, 2025.
