= Travis Paulson =

American amateur wrestler (born 1985)

Personal information
- Born: May 11, 1985 (age 41) Omaha, Nebraska, U.S.
- Home town: Council Bluffs, Iowa, U.S.

Sport
- Sport: Wrestling
- Event(s): Freestyle and Folkstyle
- College team: Iowa State Cyclones
- Club: Cyclone Wrestling Club
- Team: USA

Travis Paulson (born May 11, 1985) is an American freestyle wrestler who formerly competed at 74 kg for the United States of America.

== Biography ==
Paulson wrestled for Lewis Central High School in Council Bluffs, Iowa during his high school career. He was a three-time Iowa high school state champion (1999, 2001, 2002). After high school, Paulson attended Iowa State University and was a three-time All-American, including a career-best fifth-place finish at 165 pounds at the 2007 NCAA Division I Wrestling Championships.

At the senior level, Paulson finished first at the US World Team Trials in 2010, representing the United States at the 2010 World Wrestling Championships.
