= Anthony Goodlow =

American football player (born 2000)

No. 96 – Las Vegas Raiders
- Position: Defensive end
- Roster status: Practice squad

Personal information
- Born: July 25, 2000 (age 26)
- Listed height: 6 ft 5 in (1.96 m)
- Listed weight: 300 lb (136 kg)

Career information
- High school: Del City (Del City, Oklahoma)
- College: Tulsa (2018–2022); Oklahoma State (2023)
- NFL draft: 2024: undrafted

Career history
- Los Angeles Rams (2024)*; Arizona Cardinals (2024–2025); Pittsburgh Steelers (2025)*; Carolina Panthers (2026)*; Las Vegas Raiders (2026–present)*
- * Offseason or practice squad member only

Career NFL statistics as of 2025
- Tackles: 3
- Stats at Pro Football Reference

Anthony Goodlow (born July 25, 2000) is an American professional football defensive end for the Las Vegas Raiders of the National Football League (NFL) . He played college football for the Tulsa Golden Hurricane and Oklahoma State Cowboys and has also been a member of the Los Angeles Rams.

== Early life ==
Goodlow was born on July 25, 2000. He attended Del City High School where he played football as a safety before moving to linebacker. He grew from 5 feet 9 inches (1.75 m) and 160 pounds (73 kg) as a sophomore to 6 feet 5 inches (1.96 m) and 230 pounds (100 kg) as a senior. He posted 30 tackles-for-loss and 19 sacks as a senior and was named the district player of the year. He committed to play college football for the Tulsa Golden Hurricane.

== College career ==
Goodlow recorded no statistics while playing as a backup in 2018 for Tulsa, then tallied nine tackles in 12 games in 2019. In 2020, he made 32 tackles and four sacks, and in 2021, Goodlow totaled 28 tackles and a team-leading six sacks while appearing in all 13 games. He then earned second-team All-American Athletic Conference (AAC) honors in 2022 after starting all 12 games and posting 44 tackles, 8.0 tackles-for-loss and two sacks. Goodlow transferred to the Oklahoma State Cowboys for his final season in 2023. He tallied 42 tackles with the Cowboys and was named honorable mention All-Big 12 Conference.

== Professional career ==
Pre-draft measurables
Height	Weight	Arm length	Hand span	Wingspan	40-yard dash	10-yard split	20-yard split	20-yard shuttle	Three-cone drill	Vertical jump	Broad jump	Bench press
6 ft 4 1/4 in (1.94 m)	283 lb (128 kg)	34 5/8 in (0.88 m)	9 1/2 in (0.24 m)	6 ft 10 5/8 in (2.10 m)	4.95 s	1.88 s	2.89 s	4.42 s	7.15 s	28.0 in (0.71 m)	9 ft 4 in (2.84 m)	22 reps
All values from Pro Day

=== Los Angeles Rams ===
After going unselected in the 2024 NFL draft, Goodlow signed with the Los Angeles Rams as an undrafted free agent. He was waived/injured on August 27, 2024, then released from injured reserve with a settlement on September 6.

=== Arizona Cardinals ===
Goodlow signed with the practice squad of the Arizona Cardinals on October 30, 2024. After the season, he signed a reserve/future contract with the Cardinals on January 7, 2025.

On August 26, 2025, Goodlow was waived by the Cardinals as part of final roster cuts and then re-signed to the practice squad the next day. He was elevated to the active roster for the team's Week 3 game against the San Francisco 49ers and made his NFL debut in the game, posting a tackle. On November 18, Goodlow was released by the Cardinals.

=== Pittsburgh Steelers ===
On November 25, 2025, Goodlow was signed to the Pittsburgh Steelers' practice squad. On January 14, 2026, he signed a reserve/futures contract with Pittsburgh. Goodlow was waived by the Steelers as a part of final roster cuts on August 30.

=== Carolina Panthers ===
On September 1, 2026, Goodlow was signed to the Carolina Panthers' practice squad. On October 12, he was released.

=== Las Vegas Raiders ===
On November 3, 2026, Goodlow signed with the Las Vegas Raiders practice squad.
