= OASC =

OASC may refer to:

- Officer and Aircrew Selection Centre, based at RAF Cranwell
- Oklahoma Association of Student Councils
