= Del City High School =

Coordinates: 35.44587°N 97.439958°W

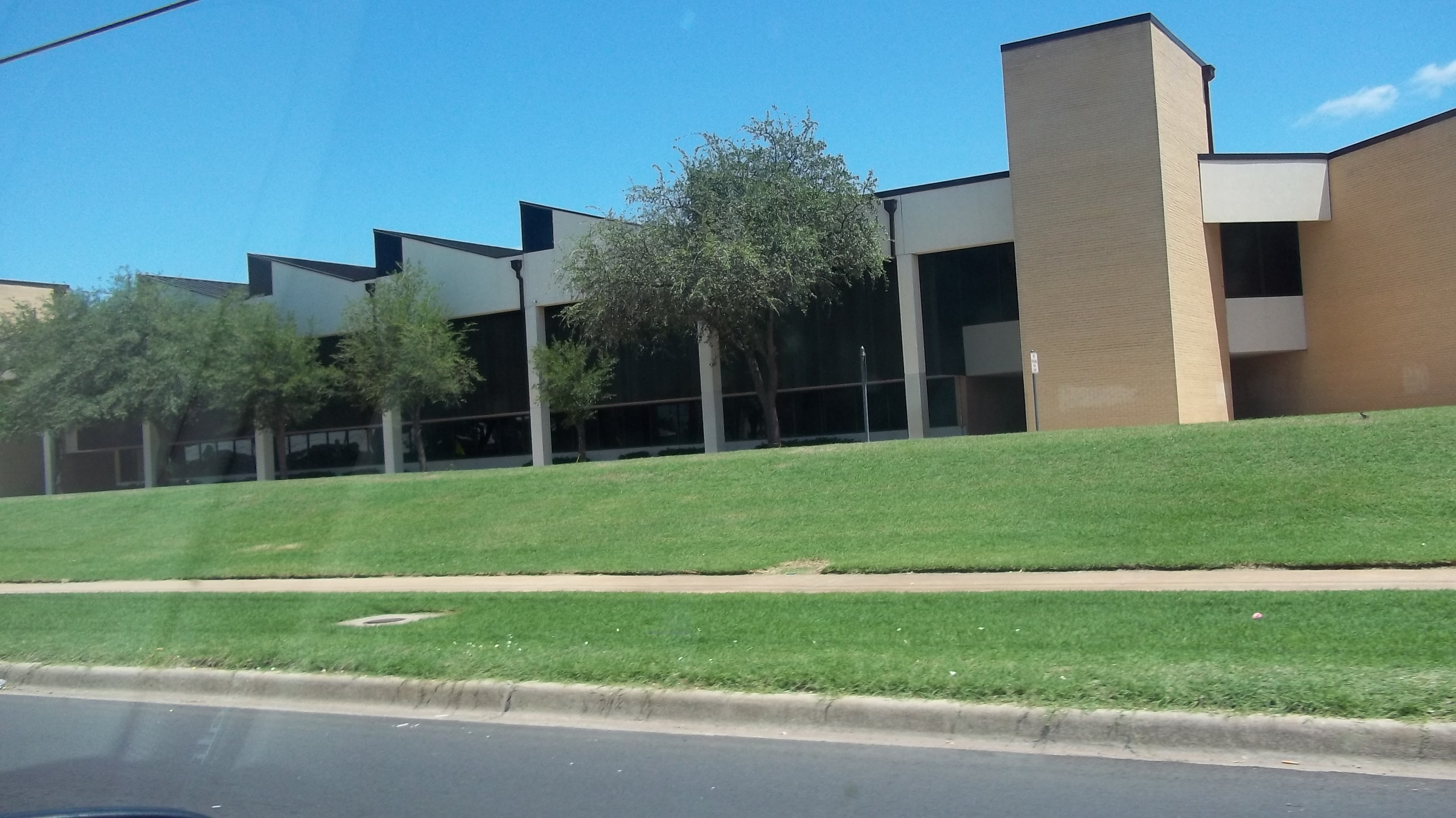

Location
- 1900 S Sunnylane Road; Del City, Oklahoma 73115; United States

Information
- Type: Secondary school
- School district: Mid-Del School District
- Principal: Steve Gilliland
- Teaching staff: 66.16 (FTE)
- Grades: 9-12
- Enrollment: 1,180 (2023-2024)
- Student to teacher ratio: 17.84
- Campus type: Suburban
- Colors: Red and white
- Song: Alma Mater
- Fight song: Red and White Forever
- Athletics: American football, basketball, baseball, softball, etc.
- Athletics conference: Class 5A
- Mascot: Eagles
- Rival: Midwest City High School
- Feeder schools: Del City Middle School
- Website: www.mid-del.net/o/dchs

Del City High School is the only public high school located in Del City, Oklahoma, U.S., and one of three high schools in the Mid-Del School District. The school opened in 1953. According to GreatSchools.org, the high school is rated above Midwest City High School and below Carl Albert High School, the other two high schools in the district. The school serves approximately 1,254 students. About a third of graduating students attend a four-year college.

In addition to sections of Del City, the high school's boundary includes Smith Village, most of Forest Park, and sections of Oklahoma City.

== History ==
Del City High School was established in 1953 and graduated its first class soon after.

== Curriculum ==
The curriculum taught at Del City High is governed by state-mandated requirements for graduation. Subjects taught are physical education, Spanish, French, biology, chemistry, physics, business, general education, social studies, English, mathematics, career and technology, and the fine arts.

To graduate, students must take a total of 27 classes. Students take four classes each of language arts, mathematics, and social studies. They are required to take three science classes, two fine arts classes, two foreign language or computer technology classes and a physical education class.

== Sports ==
Del City High School students participate in baseball, cross country, softball, track, basketball, American football, swimming, volleyball, golf, soccer, tennis, marching band, color guard and wrestling.

=== Basketball ===
==== Boys ====
The boys' team won the 1980 5A state championship 49–34 against Lawton Eisenhower. In 2021 boys basketball won the 6A state championship and a 5A state championship in 2023.

==== Girls ====
In 2009, the girls' basketball team made its fourth appearance in the 6A State Tournament going on to win the 6A State Championship for their first ever State Championship.

=== American football ===
Del City, then coached by former Washington Redskin Leo Presley, defeated Midwest City in the first-ever rivalry match-up between the two teams.

The football team beat Putman City West 27–13 for the 1976 4A state championship.

On September 4, 2009, Del City Eagles beat their Sooner Road rivals, The Midwest City Bombers, for the first time since 2002 with a final score of 27–15.

Del City was 5A State Runner-up, losing to fellow Mid-Del school Carl Albert 35-14. This was the first time Del City had been back to the State Championship since they won back in 1976.

=== Track ===
==== Boys ====
Del City won the State Championship for boys track in 2019.

==== Girls ====
Del City girls track completed a 4-peat by winning the State Championship in 2016, 2017, 2018, and 2019.

=== Wrestling Dual ===
Del City were State Wrestling Dual Champions in 1989 and 1992.

== Extra-curricular activities ==
=== Student Council ===
Del City Student Council is responsible for a number of activities with the school and community. It is an active member of the Oklahoma Association of Student Councils and National Association of Student Councils and attends the former's state convention and two District 9 workshops yearly and the annual Trey Leadership Conference. The council hosts WILD Week (Willing Individuals Leading with Determination) It was named the Oklahoma Association of Student Council State Secretary for 2014 and President for 2018. They have hosted the Oklahoma Association of Student Councils 74th State Conference in November 2014 and the 81st State Conference in 2021.

=== National Honor Society ===
The National Honor Society honors those students who have demonstrated excellence in the areas of scholarship, leadership, service and character.

=== Band ===
The Del City High School Band program consists of the Pride of Del City marching band, concert band, two jazz bands, drumline, winter guard and an athletic pep band. The band is active in the community and the state, doing over 50 performances throughout the school year. There are two full jazz bands. The Advanced Jazz Band was the 1981, 1982, 1983, 1984, 1985, 1986, 1987, 1988, 1991, 1992, 1994, 1995, 1996, 1997, 1998, 1999, 2013, 2014, 2016, 2017, 2018, and 2019 OSSAA State Champions.

=== Naval Junior Reserve Officer Training Corps ===
The Naval Junior Reserve Officer Training Corps teaches cadets basic military skills, military history, leadership skills and techniques, and discipline.

Del City High School's unit, called Eagle Company, was created in fall 1994. It is a multi-disciplinary curriculum encompassing leadership, citizenship, health, study skills, history, meteorology, astronomy, oceanography, navigation, current events, military drill, physical fitness and fun. In addition to the academics, students are given opportunities to assume various responsibilities within the unit as squad or platoon leaders. The unit hosts four drill teams, a color (honor) guard, marksmanship, athletic and academic teams. The academic teams have consistently been ranked in the top fifty of the US, competing against over 3,000 NJROTC teams nationwide. The color guards have appeared around the state at numerous civic and military functions. The cadets perform at community service functions and fund raisers, and were awarded the Volunteer Organization of the Year award by the American Red Cross, the Distinguished Unit award, and Unit Achievement awards by the Navy. The cadets have raised thousands of dollars for the Special Olympics, provided holiday meals to the less fortunate, and provided monetary and physical assistance to disaster (tornado/flooding) victims.

== Notable alumni ==
- Bob Kalsu (1963), former NFL player, Buffalo Bills Wall of Famer. One of two active NFL players to be killed in the Vietnam War, Del City's football stadium is named in his honor and dedicated a statue in his honor.
- Lee Roy Smith (1976), World silver medalist in freestyle wrestling, NCAA wrestling champion at Oklahoma State
- Steve Russell (1981), retired army lieutenant colonel and author of the book We Got Him! A Memoir of the Hunt and Capture of Saddam Hussein. A former Oklahoma State Senator and US House of Representatives for Oklahoma's 5th congressional district.
- John Smith (1983), Olympic freestyle wrestler, 2-time NCAA champion, 4-time World champion, 2-time Olympic champion, former head wrestling coach at Oklahoma State University.
- Andy Fugate (1984), Oklahoma State House Representative for House District 94 and Minority Floor Leader.
- Clark Jolley (1988), Former Oklahoma State Senator for Senate District 41 (2004-2016), Oklahoma Secretary of Finance, Administration and Information Technology (2018-2019), and Member of the Oklahoma Tax Commission (2017-2021).
- Pat Smith (1989), first four-time NCAA Division I wrestling champion.
- Scott Inman (1997), Former Oklahoma State House Representative for House District 94 (2006-2018) and Leader of the Minority Party of the Oklahoma House of Representatives (2010-2017).
- Josh Scobey (1997), former NFL player
- Nick Blackburn (2000), former MLB pitcher
- Collin Walke (2001), Former Oklahoma State House Representative for House District 87 (2016-2022) and currently a Cybersecurity and Data Privacy attorney
- Toni Young (2009), former WNBA player
- Terry Wilson (2016), CFL quarterback
- Brandon Garrison (2023), basketball player for the Kentucky Wildcats
- Rodney Fields Jr. (2024), college football running back for the Kansas State Wildcats
