= Alan Fried =

American wrestler (born 1971)

Personal information
- Born: August 11, 1971 (age 55) Poughkeepsie, New York, U.S.
- Weight: 142 lb (64 kg)

Sport
- Country: United States
- Sport: Wrestling
- Events: Freestyle and Folkstyle
- College team: Oklahoma State
- Team: USA
- Coached by: John Smith
Medal record
Men's freestyle wrestling
Representing the United States
Pan American Championships
Gold medal – first place	1993 Guatemala City	62 kg
Maccabiah Games
Gold medal – first place	1997 Ramat Gan	68 kg
Espoir World Championships
Gold medal – first place	1991 Previdza	62 kg
US Open Championships
Silver medal – second place	1995 Las Vegas	62 kg
Bronze medal – third place	1993 Las Vegas	62 kg
Bronze medal – third place	1994 Las Vegas	62 kg
Collegiate Wrestling
Representing the Oklahoma State Cowboys
NCAA Division I Championships
Gold medal – first place	1994 Chapel Hill	142 lb
Silver medal – second place	1991 Iowa City	134 lb
Silver medal – second place	1992 Oklahoma City	134 lb
Big Eight Championships
Gold medal – first place	1991 Columbia	134 lb
Gold medal – first place	1992 Stillwater	134 lb
Gold medal – first place	1994 Ames	142 lb

Alan M. Fried (born August 11, 1971) is an American former freestyle and folkstyle wrestler. He was an NCAA National Champion, Espoir World Champion (20 years and under), three-time Ohio State Champion, and the first wrestler to win four Junior National Freestyle titles. He is also an author.

== Early life and wrestling ==
Fried was born in Poughkeepsie, New York to Kenneth (1942–2003) and Elaine Fried (1945–2004, née Agin). The couple also had another son, Adam.

Fried began wrestling in the 5th grade at the Longwood YMCA in Macedonia, Ohio, where a trio of coaches had a major impact on him: head coach Dave Mariola and assistants Bernie Weiskopf and Tim Rutherford. A year later, he traveled to neighboring Pennsylvania to win the Pennsylvania Junior High state championship; he repeated as champion the following two years prior to entering high school.

Despite being Jewish and living on Cleveland's east side, Fried attended St. Edward High School in Lakewood, Ohio, an all-boys catholic high school on the city's west side. The school was a wrestling powerhouse before Fried arrived, having won 8 Ohio High School Athletic Association (OHSAA) "big school" state titles under legendary coach Howard E. Ferguson as well as several national titles. Fried helped add two more state titles to St. Edward's streak of 10 consecutive state championships (1978–1987).

Fried flourished under the disciplined Ferguson. He had a tremendous high school wrestling career, amassing 139-3 record. He was a three-time Ohio State Champion (1987, 1988, 1989), and finished third (1986). He graduated from St. Edward in 1989, and is a Member of the St. Edward Hall of Fame.

He would also compete in the USA Junior Freestyle Championships, where he would become the first wrestler to win four Junior National Freestyle titles, winning the Outstanding Wrestler Award in 1989.

Fried finished his high school career as a 1988 and 1989 Asics Tiger 1st Team All-American, 1988 Asics Tiger National High School Wrestler of the Year, and 1989 Lee Kemp Award Winner.

== Collegiate and International wrestling career ==
Fried attended Oklahoma State University. The Cowboys had a wrestling program steeped in tradition. He became a three-time All-American, reaching the NCAA finals in 1991 (second-place finish, 134 lbs.), 1992 (second-place finish, 134 lbs.), and 1994 (National Champion, 142 lbs.). He was also a three-time 1st Team Academic All-American in 1991, 1992, and 1994.

Fried's NCAA title was instrumental in helping John Smith secure his first NCAA team championship as the head coach of Oklahoma State in 1994. His career record at Oklahoma State was 129-6, which ranks as the second most wins all-time for the Cowboys. Five of his six collegiate losses came at the hands of 1996 Olympic gold medalist and three-time NCAA champion Tom Brands from the University of Iowa. He also ranks third in career winning percentage (.956), fourth in most consecutive matches without a defeat (65), and seventh in career falls (44). He graduated in 1994 with a Bachelor of Science (B.S.) in Psychology. Fried's combined high school and college record was 268-9 (97% win percentage).

On the National freestyle scene, Fried was the 1989 and 1991 Espoir (20 yrs & under) National Champion, winning the Outstanding Wrestler Award for both tournaments. He also won a pair of freestyle University National Championships in 1992 and 1993. At the USA Wrestling Senior level, Fried took third place at the 1993 and 1994 U.S. Open, and was the National Runner-up at the 1995 U.S. Open.

At the International level, Alan represented the USA on two age level World teams and in numerous Olympic age level international competitions. In the 20 years old and under World Championships in 1991, held in Previdza, Czechoslovakia. Alan won the Gold Medal, beating the wrestler from the former Soviet Union in the finals and was awarded the "Best Technical Wrestler" for the championships. In the 18 years old and under category, Fried placed 4th at World Championships in 1988, held in Wolfurt, Austria.

In 1993 Fried represented Team USA at the Senior level, winning the Gold Medal at the 1993 Pan American Championships. He also won a Gold Medal at the 15th Maccabiah Games in 1997 in Tel Aviv, Israel.

Fried finished 6th in the 1996 and 2000 Olympic Trials, both at (68 kg), and missed the U.S. Olympic Team. Injuries to his back and shoulder as well as a broken elbow had taken a toll and required two back surgeries in 1996 and two shoulder surgeries. These issues factored into his retirement from wrestling in 2000.

== After wrestling ==
Fried later earned a Juris Doctor from Cleveland State University College of Law in 2002 and passed the Illinois State Bar Examination in 2003. After the passing of both his parents from inoperable and aggressive glioblastoma brain cancer, Fried moved back to Cleveland. He briefly took a position as law clerk at Reminger & Reminger, Co. L.P.A., where his brother Adam is a partner and practices probate law. Alan passed the Ohio Bar Examination in 2005 and practiced law in Cleveland until mid-2007, when he relocated back in Chicago, Illinois to become a Futures Trader.

In 2005, he wrote a book with contributor Nicholas Rizzo M.D., The Arsenal: The Wrestler's Training Log ISBN 0-9748220-2-7.

In 2014, he became an assistant coach for the Beachwood High School Wrestling Team in Beachwood, OH

Later, Fried moved to Medina, Ohio, where he found the Highland Local School District Wrestling team and worked as an assistant coach, before being promoted to head coach.

Fried also runs the Alan Fried Wrestling Academy | Wrestling School, Wrestling Camps ... https://www.friedwrestling.com/

== Mixed martial arts record ==
Professional record breakdown
1 match	0 wins	1 loss
By submission	0	1

Res.	Record	Opponent	Method	Event	Date	Round	Time	Location	Notes
Loss	0–1	Rumina Sato	Submission (armbar)	Shooto – Reconquista 3	August 27, 1997	1	0:59	Tokyo, Japan	
