= Smith Village, Oklahoma =

- Town
- Location in Oklahoma County and the state of Oklahoma.
- Coordinates: 35°27′03″N 97°27′25″W
- Country: United States
- State: Oklahoma
- County: Oklahoma
- Founder: Rose Smith
- Named for: Rose Smith

Area
  - Total: 0.027 sq mi (0.07 km^{2})
  - Land: 0.027 sq mi (0.07 km^{2})
  - Water: 0 sq mi (0.00 km^{2})
- Elevation: 1,214 ft (370 m)

Population (2020)
  - Total: 49
  - Density: 1,738.7/sq mi (671.32/km^{2})
- Time zone: UTC-6 (Central (CST))
  - Summer (DST): UTC-5 (CDT)
- FIPS code: 40-68200
- GNIS feature ID: 2413298

Smith Village is a town in Oklahoma County, Oklahoma, United States, and a part of the Oklahoma City Metropolitan Area. As of the 2020 census, Smith Village had a population of 49.

== History ==
Rose Henrietta Smith inherited a twenty-acre farm which she subdivided into lots and created the Rose Smith Addition housing development. The town encompasses 0.03 square miles and is bounded by Oklahoma City on the west side and by Del City on the North, East and South. In 1952 when Del City attempted to annex the addition, its residents decided to incorporate which was done by a vote in November 1952. Since 1952 a town government has been elected on an irregular basis. Water and sewer services are provided by Sooner Utilities.

== Geography ==
According to the United States Census Bureau, the town has a total area of 0.0 mi^{2} (0.1 km^{2}), all land.

== Demographics ==
Historical population
Census	Pop.	Note	%±
1960	93		—
1970	93		0.0%
1980	60		−35.5%
1990	34		−43.3%
2000	40		17.6%
2010	66		65.0%
2020	49		−25.8%
U.S. Decennial Census

=== 2020 census ===
As of the 2020 census, Smith Village had a population of 49. The median age was 54.5 years. 12.2% of residents were under the age of 18 and 26.5% of residents were 65 years of age or older. For every 100 females there were 88.5 males, and for every 100 females age 18 and over there were 95.5 males age 18 and over.

100.0% of residents lived in urban areas, while 0.0% lived in rural areas.

There were 27 households in Smith Village, of which 44.4% had children under the age of 18 living in them. Of all households, 37.0% were married-couple households, 25.9% were households with a male householder and no spouse or partner present, and 22.2% were households with a female householder and no spouse or partner present. About 18.5% of all households were made up of individuals and 7.4% had someone living alone who was 65 years of age or older.

There were 30 housing units, of which 10.0% were vacant. The homeowner vacancy rate was 0.0% and the rental vacancy rate was 12.5%.

Racial composition as of the 2020 census
Race	Number	Percent
White	39	79.6%
Black or African American	2	4.1%
American Indian and Alaska Native	1	2.0%
Asian	2	4.1%
Native Hawaiian and Other Pacific Islander	0	0.0%
Some other race	0	0.0%
Two or more races	5	10.2%
Hispanic or Latino (of any race)	1	2.0%

=== 2010 census ===
As of the census of 2010, there were 66 people, 26 households, and 20 families residing in the town. The population density was 1,390.5 inhabitants per square mile (536.9/km^{2}). There were 20 housing units at an average density of 695.3 per square mile (268.5/km^{2}). The racial makeup of the town was 85.00% White, 5.00% Native American, 5.00% from other races, and 5.00% from two or more races. Hispanic or Latino of any race were 7.50% of the population.

There were 26 households, out of which 23.1% had children under the age of 18 living with them, 50.0% were married couples living together, and 23.1% were non-families. 31.6% of all households were made up of individuals, and none had someone living alone who was 65 years of age or older. The average household size was 2.11 and the average family size was 2.64.

In the town, the population was spread out, with 17.5% under the age of 18, 7.5% from 18 to 24, 35.0% from 25 to 44, and 40.0% from 45 to 64. The median age was 42 years. For every 100 females, there were 110.5 males. For every 100 females age 18 and over, there were 135.7 males.

The median income for a household in the town was $40,000, and the median income for a family was $50,625. Males had a median income of $16,250 versus $30,833 for females. The per capita income for the town was $12,926. About 22.2% of families and 33.3% of the population were below the poverty line, including no under eighteens and 100.0% of those over 64.

== Education ==
It is in the Mid-Del School District.

The zoned schools are Epperly Heights Elementary School, Del Crest Junior High School, and Del City High School.

== See also ==
- Del City
