= J. D. Runnels =

American football player (born 1984)

Personal information
- Born: June 19, 1984 (age 42); Midwest City, Oklahoma, U.S.
- Listed height: 5 ft 11 in (1.80 m)
- Listed weight: 237 lb (108 kg)

Career information
- High school: Carl Albert (Midwest City)
- College: Oklahoma
- NFL draft: 2006: 6th round, 195th overall pick

Career history

Playing
- Chicago Bears (2006–2007); Tampa Bay Buccaneers (2008)*; Cincinnati Bengals (2008–2009)*; Florida Tuskers (2010)
- * Offseason or practice squad member only

Coaching
- Choctaw (OK) HS (2016) Assistant coach; West Junior HS (2019–2020) Head coach; East Central (2021) Running backs coach; Houston Gamblers (2022) co-Offensive coordinator/Running backs coach
- Stats at Pro Football Reference

James D. Runnels (born June 19, 1984) is an American football coach and former fullback. He played college football at Oklahoma from 2002 to 2005. He played in the National Football League (NFL) for 4 seasons from 2006 to 2009, with his longest tenure as a player with the Chicago Bears.

Runnels was born in Midwest City, Oklahoma. He attended high school at Carl Albert High School in Midwest City. After graduation from high school in 2002, he enrolled at the University of Oklahoma and played running back for the Sooners.

The Chicago Bears selected Runnels in the sixth round of the 2006 NFL draft. He played 4 seasons as a fullback in the NFL, with the Chicago from 2006 to 2007, the Tampa Bay Buccaneers in 2008 and the Cincinnati Bengals from 2008 to 2009. He also played and a season in the United Football League (UFL) with the Florida Tuskers.

== Early life ==
Runnels attended Carl Albert High School in Midwest City where he played football, mostly at running back, but he also played wide receiver, tight end and defensive end. He helped lead Carl Albert to three Oklahoma state championships in class 5A. He was a consensus all state player and set school records for career receiving yards (1,391), career catches (67) and career receiving touchdowns (17). Runnels finished 3rd in state in 4A Shotput. Runnels graduated from Carl Albert in 2002.

== College career ==
Runnels attended the University of Oklahoma. In 53 games at Oklahoma, Runnels started 18 times. He carried twice for five yards and caught 51 passes for 450 yards (8.8 avg) and five touchdowns. In a now infamous post-game interview following a Sooner loss to the Red Raiders, Runnels was continuously interrupted by a fan yelling "GO RAIDERS!"

== Professional career ==
Pre-draft measurables
Height	Weight	40-yard dash	20-yard shuttle	Three-cone drill	Vertical jump	Broad jump	Bench press
5 ft 11 1/8 in (1.81 m)	237 lb (108 kg)	4.54 s	4.25 s	7.00 s	35.0 in (0.89 m)	10 ft 0 in (3.05 m)	28 reps
All values from Oklahoma's Pro Day

=== Chicago Bears ===
He was drafted by the Chicago Bears in the sixth round of the 2006 NFL Draft. He spent most of his rookie season on the bench, but saw playtime towards the end of the season, when starting fullback Jason McKie injured his ankle. Although Runnels was the Bears' second fullback on the depth chart, the Bears often used the more experienced third-string tight end, Gabe Reid instead. The Bears waived/injured Runnels on June 11, 2007, and he spent the season on injured reserve. He was waived by the team on July 24, 2008.

=== Tampa Bay Buccaneers ===
On August 16, 2008, Runnels signed with the Tampa Bay Buccaneers after the team released offensive tackle Luke Petitgout. He was released by the team four days later.

=== Cincinnati Bengals ===
Runnels was signed to the practice squad of the Cincinnati Bengals on October 29, 2008. He was released on November 11 when the team re-signed cornerback Geoffrey Pope.

Runnels was re-signed to a future contract on December 29, 2008. He was waived on August 10, 2009. His release was profiled on the season premiere of the HBO series Hard Knocks: Training Camp with the Cincinnati Bengals.

=== Coaching career ===
On March 17, 2022, it was announced that Runnels was hired as the Co-Offensive coordinator/Running backs coach of the Houston Gamblers of the United States Football League. He is currently the head football coach at Mount St. Mary High School in Oklahoma City, Oklahoma.
