= 1994 NCAA Division I Wrestling Championships =

NCAA championship

Tournament information
- Sport: College wrestling
- Location: Chapel Hill
- Dates: March 17, 1994–March 19, 1994
- Host: North Carolina

Final positions
- Champions: Oklahoma State (30th title)
- 1st runners-up: Iowa
- 2nd runners-up: Penn State
- MVP: Pat Smith (Oklahoma State)

The 1994 NCAA Division I Wrestling Championships were the 64th NCAA Division I Wrestling Championships to be held. North Carolina hosted the tournament in Chapel Hill at the Dean Smith Center.

Oklahoma State won the team championship with 94.75 points, their 30th team title, and had three individual champions.

Pat Smith of Oklahoma State was named the Most Outstanding Wrestler and also became the first wrestler to win four NCAA Division I Championships. Rob Sintobin of Clarion received the Gorriaran Award.

== Team results ==
Rank	School	Points
1	Oklahoma State	94.75
2	Iowa	76.5
3	Penn State	57
4	Oregon State	49.5
5	Michigan	41
6	North Carolina	39
7	Clemson	37.75
8	Oklahoma	36
8	Arizona State	36
10	Iowa State	32.75

== Individual results ==
- Note: Table does not include wrestlebacks

Weight	First	Second	Third
118 lbs	Sam Henson; Clemson	Eric Akin; Iowa State	Brett Bingham; Boise State
126 lbs	David Hirsch; Cornell	Jody Staylor; Old Dominion	Sanshiro Abe; Penn State
134 lbs	T.J. Jaworsky; North Carolina	Babek Mohammadi; Oregon State	Cary Kolat; Penn State
142 lbs	Alan Fried; Oklahoma State	Gerry Abas; Fresno State	Dunyasha Yetts; Ohio State
150 lbs	Lincoln McIlravy; Iowa	Brian Harper; Michigan	Jake Gaier; Cal Poly
158 lbs	Pat Smith; Oklahoma State	Sean Bormet; Michigan	Earl Walker; Boston
167 lbs	Mark Branch; Oklahoma State	Laszio Molnar; Cal State Fullerton	Shaon Fry; Missouri
177 lbs	Dean Morrison; West Virginia	Reese Andy; Wyoming	Brad Gibson; Minnesota
190 lbs	Joel Sharratt; Iowa	Andy Foster; Oklahoma	Tim Morrissey; Clemson
275 lbs	Kerry McCoy; Penn State	Justin Greenlee; Northern Iowa	Tony Vaughn; Purdue
