= Mid-Del School District =

School district in Oklahoma

Mid-Del Schools

Location
- Midwest City, Oklahoma; Del City, Oklahoma; Oklahoma City, Oklahoma United States

District information
- Type: Public
- Grades: K-12
- Superintendent: Dr. Rick Cobb

Students and staff
- Students: 14,500

Other information
- Website: www.mid-del.net

The Mid-Del School District is a school district based in the Oklahoma City metropolitan area. As of 2007, the school district included more than 14,500 K-12 students.

The school district has grown from four original schools to include 21 middle and elementary schools and three high schools at present. It also includes the Mid-Del Technology Center, the only designated technology center in the state that shares a school board with a public school district.

Within Oklahoma County, it includes most of Midwest City, almost all of Del City, all of Smith Village, most of Forest Park, and as well as a portion of Oklahoma City (including Tinker Air Force Base). The district extends into Cleveland County, where it includes portions of Oklahoma City and Norman.

== History ==
The school district originated as a set of schools based solely in Midwest City, which consisted of prefabricated hutments with five teachers and 125 students. It originally included four schools, two of which were precursors to Sooner Elementary School and Soldier Creek Elementary School. A total of 1,250 students were enrolled in the second year of the school system.

The first permanent school building was dedicated in 1944, after two years of using temporary buildings. It cost $314,000 and was funded through the Lanham Act and Federal Works Agency. The building today houses Jarman Middle School.

Oscar Rose was an early superintendent of the school district and the namesake for Midwest City's community college, Rose State.

In 2024 Rick Cobb, the superintendent of Mid-Del, accused Ryan Walters, the Oklahoma Superintendent of Public Instruction, of engaging in defamation against his school district by accusing the district of not properly spending funding from the federal government. Cobb made his statement at a meeting of the Oklahoma State Board of Education.

== Schools ==
The Mid-Del School District has a total of 21 public schools and a career technology school.

=== High schools ===
- Carl Albert High School, Midwest City, Oklahoma
- Del City High School, Del City, Oklahoma
- Midwest City High School, Midwest City, Oklahoma

=== Middle schools ===
- Carl Albert Middle School, Midwest City, Oklahoma
- Midwest City Middle School, Midwest City, Oklahoma
- Del City Middle School, Del City, Oklahoma

=== Elementary schools ===
- Barnes Elementary School, Oklahoma City, Oklahoma
- Cleveland Bailey Elementary School, Midwest City, Oklahoma
- Country Estates Elementary School, Midwest City, Oklahoma
- Del City Elementary School, Del City, Oklahoma
- Epperly Heights Elementary School, Del City, Oklahoma
- Highland Park Elementary School, Oklahoma City, Oklahoma
- Midwest City Elementary School, Midwest City, Oklahoma
- Parkview Elementary School, Oklahoma City, Oklahoma
- Pleasant Hill Early Childhood Center, Oklahoma City, Oklahoma
- Ridgecrest Elementary School, Midwest City, Oklahoma
- Schwartz Elementary School, Oklahoma City, Oklahoma
- Soldier Creek Elementary School, Midwest City, Oklahoma
- Steed Elementary School, Midwest City, Oklahoma
- Tinker Elementary School, Oklahoma City, Oklahoma
- Townsend Elementary School, Del City, Oklahoma

=== Technology Centers ===
- Mid-Del Technology Center, Midwest City, Oklahoma

== Notable alumni ==
- J. T. Realmuto (born 1991), a Major League Baseball player for the Philadelphia Phillies. He went to Carl Albert Highschool
- Jason Taylor II (born 1999), a National Football League safety for the Kansas City Chiefs. He went to Carl Albert Highschool
- Dadrion Taylor-Demerson (born 2001), a National Football League safety for the Arizona Cardinals. He went to Carl Albert Highschool
- J.D. Runnels (born 1984), an American football coach and former fullback for the Chicago Bears, Tampa Bay Buccaneers, Cincinnati Bengals, and the Florida Tuskers. He went to Carl Albert Highschool.

== See also ==
- List of school districts in Oklahoma
