= Rose State College =

Community college in Midwest City, Oklahoma, US

Coordinates: 35°26′39″N 97°24′47″W

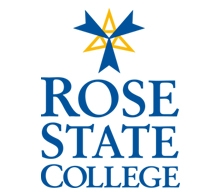
- Rose State Logo
- Former name: Oscar Rose Junior College
- Type: Public community college
- Established: 1970
- President: Travis Hurst
- Students: 7,313 (fall 2023)
- Location: Midwest City, Oklahoma, United States
- Campus: 116 acres (47 ha)
- Colors: Blue and Gold
- Sporting affiliations: NJCAA Division I
- Mascot: Raider
- Website: rose.edu

Rose State College is a public community college in Midwest City, Oklahoma.

== History ==
Rose State College was originally named Oscar Rose Junior College in memory of Oscar V. Rose, a former Mid-Del School District school superintendent. The school was renamed Rose State College in April 1983 by Senate Bill Number 9, which went into effect on November 1, 1983.

Rose State College offered its first classes on September 21, 1970. Voters in Midwest City, Del City, and portions of southeastern and northeastern Oklahoma City approved the college district in 1968. This vote followed passage of Senate Bill Number 2 in 1967, a law enabling district-operated community colleges to receive state aid. Voters then passed a $1.75 million general obligation bond issue, a two-mill levy for operating expenses in 1969, and a three-mill levy for operations in 1970. In December 1973, the junior college became a member of The Oklahoma State System of Higher Education, after approval from the Rose State College Board of Trustees. Rose State College exists as a publicly created and sustained, open-admissions, associate degree-granting college to provide comprehensive lower-division programs of higher education and related community services. To meet enrollment growth, the Communication Center was built in 1998, providing art, music, and journalism classrooms as well as a home for theatrical and musical performances. Part of the college was impacted by a tornado on May 3, 1999; some of the damage in this area was rated high-end F4 on the Fujita scale, although F5 was considered. Popularity of the dental hygiene and dental assistant programs led to the construction of the Health Sciences Annex, completed in 2001. Rose State College has grown from an initial enrollment of 1,700 in 1970 to a regular fall enrollment of approximately 8,200. The campus now includes twenty-two buildings on approximately 116 acres (0.47 km^{2}).

== Academics ==
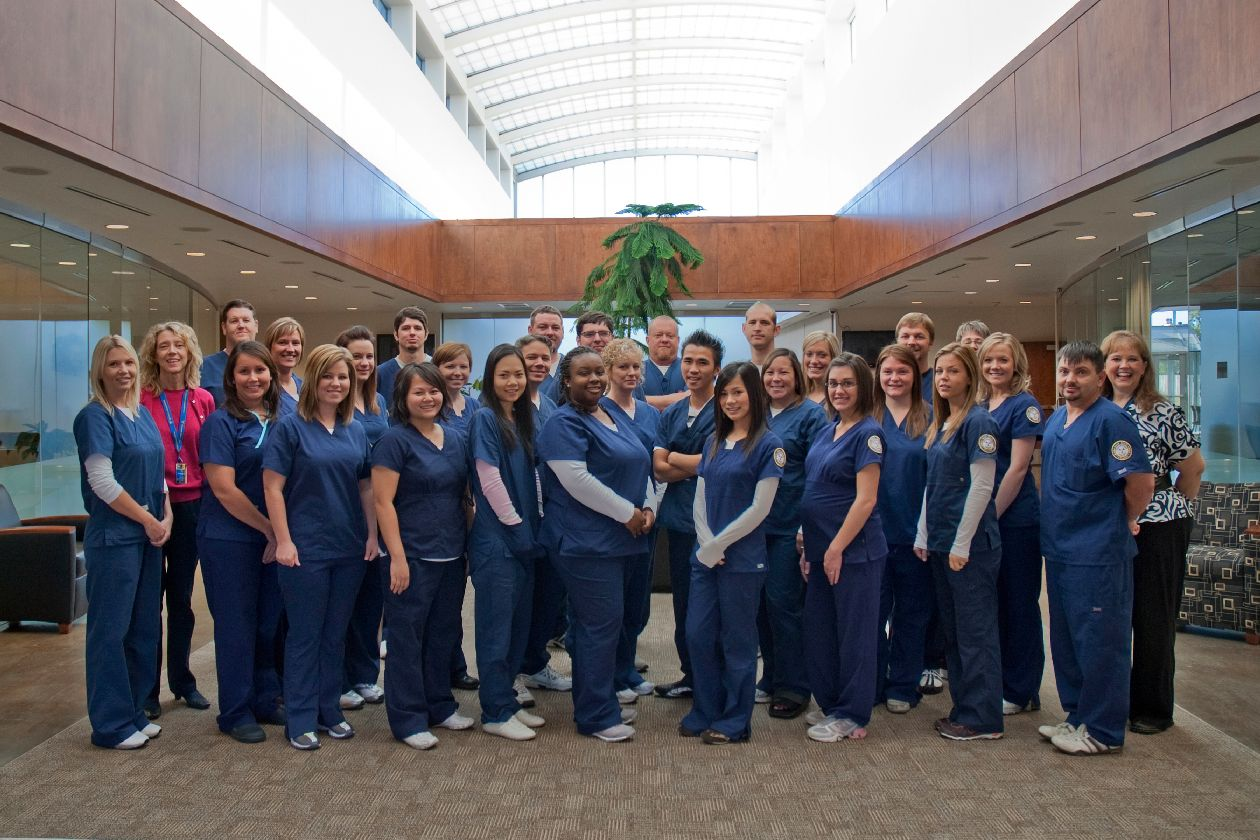
2011 Graduating Class of Rose State College Division of Respiratory Care

The college has a regular enrollment of more than 8,000 students and covers over 116 acres (0.47 km^{2}). Rose State offers scholarships to students including Leadership Scholarships and the Ticket to Rose Program. Ticket to Rose provides free tuition and mandatory fees for graduates of Midwest City High School, Carl Albert High School, Choctaw High School, Del City High School, and Star Spencer High School.

== Student life ==
Rose State's colors are blue and gold, and their mascot is the Raider, based on Doolittle's Raiders, best known for leading a bombing run on Tokyo on April 18, 1942, shortly following the bombing of Pearl Harbor, Hawaii, marking the U.S. entry into World War II. The college serves hundreds of military personnel each year due to its proximity to Tinker Air Force Base. The college runs a student newspaper, entitled The 15th Street News, and hosts a number of community events throughout the year. On the campus of Rose State is "The Village," a complex of apartment-style housing capable of accommodating up to 180 students.
