= Carter Park, Oklahoma =

- City
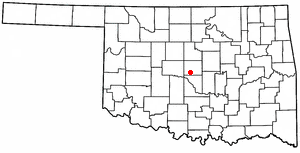
- Location of Cater Park, Oklahoma
- Coordinates: 36°26′46″N 97°27′27″W
- Country: United States
- State: Oklahoma
- County: Oklahoma County
- Settled: 1947
- Annexed: 1954
- Founder: Edward Carter
- Named for: Edward Carter
- Elevation: 1,201 ft (366 m)
- Time zone: UTC-6 (Central (CST))
  - Summer (DST): UTC-5 (CDT)

Carter Park was a city in Oklahoma County, Oklahoma, United States. It was located south of S.E. 15th Street and west of Sunnylane Road, west of Del City. It was annexed in 1954 by Del City.

== History ==
Edward Carter, an Oklahoma City area home builder, purchased land at Southeast Fifteenth Street and Sunny Lane Road in 1947. There he built and later incorporated the city of Carter Park. In 1951 facing possible annexation by Oklahoma City, Del City officials offered to annex the city instead, this offer was turned down, however. Carter Park instead annexed Mansfield addition as an unincorporated housing addition, this doubled the size of Carter Park. Del City continued to persuade Carter Park till 1954 when a merger agreement was reached allowing Del City to absorb Carter Park.
