= Forest Park, Oklahoma =

- Town
- Seal

- Location in Oklahoma County and the state of Oklahoma.
- Coordinates: 35°30′26″N 97°26′50″W
- Country: United States
- State: Oklahoma
- County: Oklahoma

Area
  - Total: 1.83 sq mi (4.75 km^{2})
  - Land: 1.83 sq mi (4.75 km^{2})
  - Water: 0 sq mi (0.00 km^{2})
- Elevation: 1,184 ft (361 m)

Population (2020)
  - Total: 1,049
  - Density: 572.1/sq mi (220.88/km^{2})
- Time zone: UTC-6 (Central (CST))
  - Summer (DST): UTC-5 (CDT)
- FIPS code: 40-26850
- GNIS feature ID: 2412636
- Website: forestparkok.gov

Forest Park is a town in Oklahoma County, Oklahoma, United States, and a part of the Oklahoma City metropolitan area. As of the 2020 census, Forest Park had a population of 1,049.

== Geography ==
According to the United States Census Bureau, the town has a total area of 2.1 square miles (5.4 km^{2}), all land.

== Demographics ==
Historical population
Census	Pop.	Note	%±
1960	766		—
1970	835		9.0%
1980	1,148		37.5%
1990	1,249		8.8%
2000	1,066		−14.7%
2010	998		−6.4%
2020	1,049		5.1%
U.S. Decennial Census

=== Racial and ethnic composition ===
Forest Park town, Oklahoma – Racial and ethnic composition Note: the US Census treats Hispanic/Latino as an ethnic category. This table excludes Latinos from the racial categories and assigns them to a separate category. Hispanics/Latinos may be of any race.
Race / Ethnicity (NH = Non-Hispanic)	Pop 2000	Pop 2010	Pop 2020	% 2000	% 2010	% 2020
White alone (NH)	237	164	215	22.23%	16.43%	20.50%
Black or African American alone (NH)	769	729	701	72.14%	73.05%	66.83%
Native American or Alaska Native alone (NH)	11	12	12	1.03%	1.20%	1.14%
Asian alone (NH)	7	20	23	0.66%	2.00%	2.19%
Native Hawaiian or Pacific Islander alone (NH)	0	0	0	0.00%	0.00%	0.00%
Other race alone (NH)	0	0	1	0.00%	0.00%	0.10%
Mixed race or Multiracial (NH)	34	52	66	3.19%	5.21%	6.29%
Hispanic or Latino (any race)	8	21	31	0.75%	2.10%	2.96%
Total	1,066	998	1,049	100.00%	100.00%	100.00%

=== 2020 census ===
As of the 2020 census, Forest Park had a population of 1,049. The median age was 55.3 years. 16.9% of residents were under the age of 18 and 31.6% of residents were 65 years of age or older. For every 100 females there were 98.3 males, and for every 100 females age 18 and over there were 92.9 males age 18 and over.

78.7% of residents lived in urban areas, while 21.3% lived in rural areas.

There were 440 households in Forest Park, of which 24.1% had children under the age of 18 living in them. Of all households, 52.7% were married-couple households, 17.5% were households with a male householder and no spouse or partner present, and 27.0% were households with a female householder and no spouse or partner present. About 25.9% of all households were made up of individuals and 13.1% had someone living alone who was 65 years of age or older.

There were 473 housing units, of which 7.0% were vacant. The homeowner vacancy rate was 0.5% and the rental vacancy rate was 0.0%.

=== 2010 census ===
As of the census of 2010, there were 998 people living in the town. The population density was 501.7 inhabitants per square mile (193.7/km^{2}). There were 462 housing units at an average density of 210.4 per square mile (81.2/km^{2}). The racial makeup of the town was 22.70% White, 72.14% African American, 1.03% Native American, 0.66% Asian, and 3.47% from two or more races. Hispanic or Latino of any race were 0.75% of the population.

There were 432 households in the town, out of which 19.9% had children under the age of 18 living with them, 60.3% were married couples living together, 11.5% had a female householder with no husband present, and 24.9% were non-families. 21.9% of all households were made up of individuals, and 11.1% had someone living alone who was 65 years of age or older. The average household size was 2.46 and the average family size was 2.85.

In the town, the population was spread out, with 18.9% under the age of 18, 6.2% from 18 to 24, 18.5% from 25 to 44, 33.9% from 45 to 64, and 22.5% who were 65 years of age or older. The median age was 49 years. For every 100 females, there were 88.7 males. For every 100 females age 18 and over, there were 87.0 males.

The median income for a household in the town was $55,536, and the median income for a family was $60,163. Males had a median income of $37,000 versus $28,250 for females. The per capita income for the town was $25,300. About 4.7% of families and 5.1% of the population were below the poverty line, including 9.1% of those under age 18 and 6.8% of those age 65 or over.

== Education ==
Most of Forest Park is in Midwest City-Del City Schools. A portion is in Millwood Public Schools.

The zoned schools of the Mid-Del portion are Pleasant Hills Elementary School, Del Crest Junior High School, and Del City High School.

== Notable people ==
- Constance N. Johnson (1952- ), former member of the Oklahoma Senate, Democratic nominee for the 2014 United States Senate special election in Oklahoma, ran for governor of Oklahoma in 2018 and 2022.
