= Pat Smith (wrestler) =

American wrestler (born 1970)

Personal information
- Born: September 21, 1970 (age 55) Del City, Oklahoma, U.S.
Medal record
Men's collegiate wrestling
Representing the Oklahoma State Cowboys
NCAA Division I Championships
| Gold medal – first place | 1990 College Park | 158 lb |
| Gold medal – first place | 1991 Iowa City | 158 lb |
| Gold medal – first place | 1992 Oklahoma City | 158 lb |
| Gold medal – first place | 1994 Chapel Hill | 158 lb |
Big 8 Championships
| Gold medal – first place | 1990 Lincoln | 158 lb |
| Gold medal – first place | 1991 Columbia | 158 lb |
| Gold medal – first place | 1992 Stillwater | 158 lb |
| Gold medal – first place | 1994 Ames | 158 lb |

Pat Smith (born September 21, 1970) is a former folkstyle and freestyle wrestler. He competed collegiately at Oklahoma State University (OSU) and later served as an assistant coach at OSU. During his collegiate wrestling career, Smith became the first four-time NCAA Division I champion in the sport's history. Smith was inducted into the National Wrestling Hall of Fame as a Distinguished Member in 2006.

== Wrestling career ==
=== High School ===
Smith attended Del City High School in Del City, Oklahoma. While wrestling in high school, he would win three Oklahoma state championships (1987–1989) and was twice named Most Outstanding Wrestler at the state tournament.

=== College ===
Smith made wrestling history during his college career, when he became the first wrestler to win four NCAA Division I individual national championships. He earned NCAA titles in 1990, 1991, 1992 and 1994. He was a member of Oklahoma State teams that won the NCAA team titles in 1990 and 1994. Smith ended his college career with a 121-5-2 record, and set the Oklahoma State record for most consecutive wins without a loss with 98 straight.

=== Senior level ===
Following college, Smith competed in freestyle wrestling. He finished second at the 1996 U.S. Olympic Team Trials and second at the 1995 U.S. Freestyle Nationals. In total, he was a six-time U.S. Freestyle Nationals All-American. Smith won a bronze medal at the 1997 Wrestling World Cup.

== Coaching career ==
Following his competitive career, Smith served as an assistant coach at Oklahoma State. He would help Oklahoma State win four straight NCAA team titles from 2003 to 2006. Smith resigned as Oklahoma State's assistant coach on May 1, 2006.

In 2008, Pat Smith started running and coaching the Arkansas Wrestling Academy and the youth club the Mighty Bluebirds in Little Rock, Arkansas. At the Arkansas Wrestling Academy, Smith teaches and coaches folkstyle technique, along with freestyle in the summer. Smith has also served as the head coach of the Arkansas Junior/Cadet National Teams. Since living in Little Rock, Smith has already produced multiple state champions, national finalists, and All-Americans in the sport. Smith has had past AWA wrestlers attend schools such as Oklahoma State University, Ouachita Baptist University, Central Baptist College, Army at Westpoint, and King's College.

== Family ==
Smith's older brothers Lee Roy Smith and John Smith are NCAA Division I wrestling national champions, with Pat being the sport's first ever four-time NCAA Division I national champion. Smith's youngest brother, Mark, was also a successful NCAA Division I wrestler, having placed in the top five nationally three times. Smith's nephews Mark Perry and Chris Perry are also NCAA Division I national champions. His other nephew J. T. Realmuto is an All-Star MLB catcher for the Philadelphia Phillies.

In freestyle wrestling, his oldest brother Lee Roy was a World silver medalist, with his other older brother John, being a two-time Olympic gold medalist and four-time World champion.

== Additional Reading ==
- Dellinger, Bob & Doris. 1994. The Cowboys Ride Again. Oklahoma Bylines Inc. ISBN 978-1-882336-04-3
- Hammond, Jairus K. 2005. The History of Collegiate Wrestling. National Wrestling Hall of Fame and Museum. ISBN 978-0-9765064-0-9
- Parrish, Kim D. 2007. Cowboy Up. Oklahoma Heritage Association. ISBN 978-1-885596-61-1
