= Josh Scobey =

American football player (born 1979)

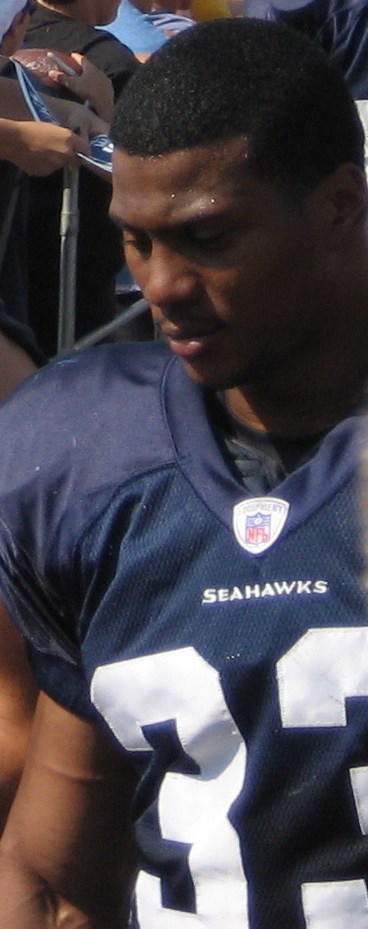
- Scobey with the Seattle Seahawks in 2006

No. 33, 39
- Position: Running back

Personal information
- Born: December 11, 1979 (age 46); Oklahoma City, Oklahoma, U.S.
- Listed height: 6 ft 0 in (1.83 m)
- Listed weight: 220 lb (100 kg)

Career information
- High school: Del City (Del City, Oklahoma)
- College: Kansas State
- NFL draft: 2002: 6th round, 185th overall pick

Career history
- Arizona Cardinals (2002–2004); Seattle Seahawks (2005–2006); Buffalo Bills (2007); Seattle Seahawks (2007); Las Vegas Locomotives (2009)

Awards and highlights
- NFL kickoff return yards leader (2003); UFL champion (2009); Second-team All-Big 12 (2001)

Career NFL statistics
- Rushing attempts: 27
- Rushing yards: 89
- Receptions: 19
- Receiving yards: 200
- Return yards: 4,160
- Total touchdowns: 1
- Stats at Pro Football Reference

Joshua Payne Scobey (born December 11, 1979) is an American former professional football player who was a running back and kick returner for seven seasons in the National Football League (NFL). He played college football at Kansas State Wildcats and was selected by the Arizona Cardinals in the sixth round of the 2002 NFL draft.

== Early life ==
At Del City High School, Scobey finished with the best single season rushing total in Del City High School history, with 1,829 yards (1997). He rushed for 3,303 total rushing yards, trailing only Bennie Butler (University of Oklahoma) in career rushing yards. He also finished only behind Butler in total rushing and receiving yards with 3,408.

== College career ==
Scobey attended Northeastern Oklahoma A&M College in Miami, Oklahoma.

He then transferred to Kansas State University, where he started at running back and set a school record for rushing touchdowns.

== Professional career ==
Pre-draft measurables
| Height | Weight | Arm length | Hand span | 40-yard dash | 10-yard split | 20-yard split | 20-yard shuttle | Three-cone drill | Vertical jump | Broad jump | Bench press |
|---|---|---|---|---|---|---|---|---|---|---|---|
| 5 ft 11 3/8 in (1.81 m) | 218 lb (99 kg) | 31 1/4 in (0.79 m) | 9 1/4 in (0.23 m) | 4.46 s | 1.59 s | 2.61 s | 3.93 s | 6.96 s | 40.5 in (1.03 m) | 10 ft 4 in (3.15 m) | 21 reps |
All values from NFL Combine

Scobey's NFL career began when he was selected by the Arizona Cardinals in the 2002 NFL draft. In 2003, Scobey led the National Football League in kick-off return yardage and was allowed to be voted for the Pro Bowl. He played for the Cardinals for three seasons before moving to the Seahawks. In Seattle, he earned an NFC championship ring and he was the Seahawks' kickoff returner in Super Bowl XL against the Pittsburgh Steelers, and served as a team captain for the game and coin toss.

On May 3, 2007, Scobey signed with the Buffalo Bills, but he re-signed with the Seahawks on December 4, exactly one year after he was placed on injured reserve by the Seahawks in 2006.

== Post-playing career ==
On June 25, 2022, Scobey was promoted to the director of college scouting by the Arizona Cardinals. In the 2022 offseason, he was promoted to director of college scouting. On May 4, 2024, Scobey and the Cardinals organization parted ways.

In May of 2024, He was hired by the Jacksonville Jaguars as a senior personnel executive. In April 2026, He parted ways with the team.

On April 29, 2026 it was reported Scobey would be joining the Miami Dolphins front office.

== Personal life ==
Scobey is a Buddhist. He practices Nichiren Buddhism through the Soka Gakkai International, and has been a practicing Buddhist since he was five years old.
