= Midwest City High School =

High school in Midwest City, Oklahoma

Coordinates: 35.452802°N 97.399596°W

Location
- 213 East Elm Street; Midwest City, (Oklahoma County), Oklahoma 73110; United States

Information
- Type: Public high school
- School district: Mid-Del School District
- Principal: Chara Patterson
- Staff: 81.26 (FTE)
- Enrollment: 1,324 (2023-2024)
- Student to teacher ratio: 16.29
- Colors: Black and gold
- Nickname: Bombers

Midwest City High School is one of two high schools in Midwest City, Oklahoma, United States. The school is part of the Mid-Del School District, and serves more than 1,600 students.

In addition to sections of Midwest City, the attendance boundary includes sections of Oklahoma City, including the base housing for Tinker Air Force Base (which has dependents of United States Air Force personnel).

== History ==
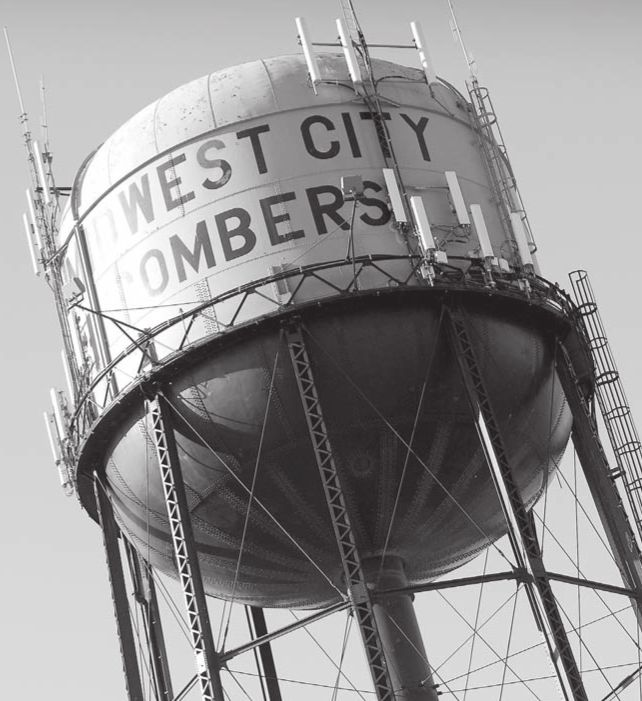

== Air Force JROTC ==
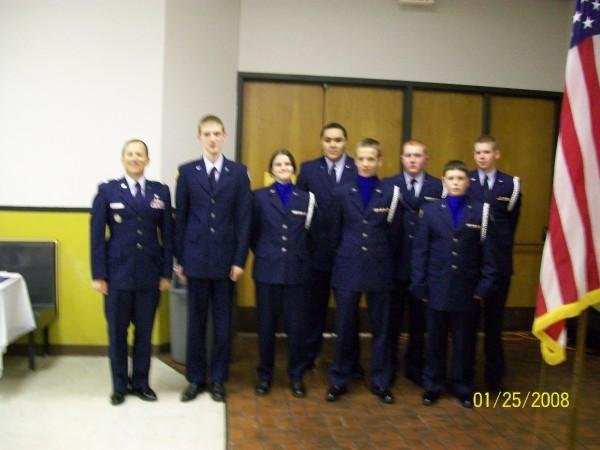
Lt. Col. Penning with cadets

== Notable alumni ==
- Ryan Budde – American baseball player (born 1979)
- Kelly Cook – American football player (born 1962)
- A. J. Hinch – American baseball player and manager (born 1974)
- Darnell Jackson – American basketball player (born 1985)
- Matt Kemp – American baseball player (born 1984)
- Huan Nguyen – Engineer and former US Navy admiral (born 1950s)
