= Del City, Oklahoma =

- City
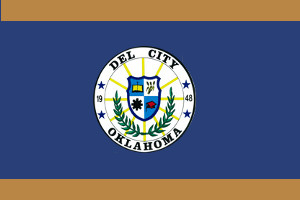
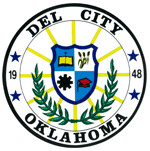
- Flag Seal

- Location in Oklahoma County and the state of Oklahoma.

- Location in the United States
- Coordinates: 35°26′54″N 97°26′27″W
- Country: United States
- State: Oklahoma
- County: Oklahoma
- Settled: 1940s
- Incorporated: October 9, 1948
- Founder: George I. Epperly
- Named for: Delaphene Campbell

Government
  - Type: Council–manager
  - Mayor: Greg Childers
  - City Manager: JD Hock

Area
  - Total: 7.52 sq mi (19.47 km^{2})
  - Land: 7.52 sq mi (19.47 km^{2})
  - Water: 0 sq mi (0.00 km^{2})
- Elevation: 1,211 ft (369 m)

Population (2020)
  - Total: 21,822
  - Density: 2,902.5/sq mi (1,120.68/km^{2})
- Time zone: UTC−6 (Central (CST))
  - Summer (DST): UTC−5 (CDT)
- ZIP codes: 73115, 73117, 73135
- Area codes: 405, 572
- FIPS code: 40-19900
- GNIS feature ID: 2410313
- Website: City of Del City

Del City is a city in Oklahoma County, Oklahoma, United States, and a part of the Oklahoma City metropolitan area. The population was 21,822 at the United States Census, 2020, a 2.3% increase from 2010.

Del City is located near two major interstate highways, both of which connect it to Oklahoma City. Interstate 40 bisects the town from the northwest to southeast, and Interstate 35 lies just a short distance west of the city. The city borders southeast Oklahoma City, Midwest City and Tinker Air Force Base. George Epperly, founded the city, which was incorporated by a vote of its residents in 1948. Del City is named after Epperly's eldest daughter, Delaphene Campbell. Since its incorporation Del City has expanded three times, first by annexing Carter Park in 1954, Midway Village in 1963 and the acquisition of an undeveloped piece of land between the city and Tinker AFB A large area of Del City was significantly impacted by the May 3, 1999, tornado outbreak that passed through the Oklahoma City metro area.

== History ==
Founded in Boone Township, Oklahoma County, as a "bedroom" community, Del City lies three miles (5 km) east of Oklahoma City and one mile (1.6 km) west of Midwest City. At the turn of the 21st century, Del City was a 7.5-square-mile (19 km^{2}) community surrounded on the north, west, and south by Oklahoma City and on the east by Midwest City. Interstate Highway 40 bisects the town from the northwest to southeast. Oklahoma City streets define the boundaries: NE 10th Street on the north; Sooner Road on the east; SE 44th Street on the south; and Bryant Avenue on the west. Northwestern corner of the city is a mile from the junction of Interstate 35 and Interstate 40, justifying its claim to being "the Crossroads of America."

In the Land Run of 1889, Jordan Pybas and his wife settled in what is present-day Del City. Five generations later the family still lives in the house that was completed in 1907. Before 1946 there were only two families living in what would become Del City. Developer George Epperly purchased a wheat field 160 acres (0.65 km^{2}) large at the corner of SE 29th Street and Sunnylane Road in 1946 with a plan to build fifty houses. In 1948 there were 582 homes in Del City, 75% of which were built by George Epperly, Despite opposition, the unincorporated Epperly Heights and its 200 families voted to approve incorporation on October 9, 1948. In February 1959, Del City adopted a charter and a council-manager form of town government. The city was named for Epperly's daughter, Delaphene Campbell.

The city expanded through the annexation of Carter Park in 1954 and Midway Village in 1963. Del City attempted to annex the Rose Smith Addition but its residents incorporated and became the town of Smith Village. The city also acquired a piece of undeveloped land that separated it from Tinker Air Force Base. Oklahoma City annexed this same piece of land, and a court fight ensued. In District court, Del City won and Oklahoma City appealed to the State Supreme Court. Del City officials, while awaiting the hearing, pursued negotiation again with Oklahoma City this time accepting 20 acres (81,000 m^{2}) along the Tinker AFB boundary. Del City, having expanded to its greatest possible physical limits in 1964, joined Midwest City and Norman in underwriting the Little River Reservoir Project that became Lake Thunderbird.

The Del City Historical Society was organized in 1975 with Andy Evans as its first president. Several children of the Eighty-niners (89ers) still lived in the area, and they identified every original homestead within city limits. Residents also learned that their town was on the path of the 1870s Arbuckle Trail, a Texas to Kansas cattle trail. Wrestler and two-time Olympic Gold Medal winner John Smith previously resided in Del City.

With home building and family-oriented amenities the founding focus, industry was slow to develop in Del City to create any jobs (99 percent of Del Citians commuted to work in 1948, while only 96 percent commuted in 2000). Don's Alley Restaurant and Midwest Trophy Manufacturing are two businesses of long standing. Don Moore opened his hamburger grill at 4601 SE 29th Street in 1955, but on October 31, 2022 it was announced that Don's Alley Restaurant would permanently close. Midwest Trophy Manufacturing began in David R. Smith's garage in Del City in 1971. Midwest Trophy Manufacturing (now known as MTM Recognition) employs over 750 people throughout North America, 400 of them in Del City. It is the city's largest industry. MTM Recognition's corporate headquarters are in Del City at 3405 SE 29th Street.

Del City is represented in the Oklahoma Legislature by House District 94 Representative Andy Fugate and Senate District 46 Senator Mark Mann. On the national level Del City is represented by 4th district Representative Tom Cole, and by U.S. Senators James Lankford and Markwayne Mullin. Del City as had four newspapers Del City Leader, Del City Sun, Del City Times, and the Del City News.

== Geography ==
According to the United States Census Bureau, the city has a total area of 7.5 square miles (19 km^{2}), all land.

The city is located in the Frontier Country region in the center of the state. Del City lies in the Sandstone Hills region of Oklahoma, known for hills of 250 to 400 feet (76 to 122 m) and two species of oak – blackjack oak (Quercus marilandica) and post oak (Q. stellata).

Del City is in a region dominated by the Cross Timbers, an area of prairie and patches of forest at the eastern extent of the Great Plains. The region is essentially a transition buffer between the wetter and more forested Eastern Oklahoma and the semi-arid high plains of Western Oklahoma, and experiences extreme swings between dry and wet weather patterns. Climate is dominated by large differences in annual rainfall totals, with Central Oklahoma's western boundary receiving far less rain than compared to its eastern boundary. Because of these convergences of dry and wet weather patterns, Del City is located at the heart of what is known as Tornado Alley, and is in one of the most tornado-prone areas in the United States.

Eagle Lake is located within Del City; the lake is located in the northern part of the city and is the only large body of water. The lake is stocked with bass, catfish, bluegill, carp, vancuren trout and crappie.

=== Climate ===
Climate data for Del City, Oklahoma
Month	Jan	Feb	Mar	Apr	May	Jun	Jul	Aug	Sep	Oct	Nov	Dec	Year
Mean daily maximum °F (°C)	46 (8)	51 (11)	59 (15)	69 (21)	77 (25)	86 (30)	91 (33)	91 (33)	82 (28)	73 (23)	59 (15)	50 (10)	70 (21)
Mean daily minimum °F (°C)	28 (−2)	32 (0)	37 (3)	50 (10)	59 (15)	68 (20)	71 (22)	69 (21)	62 (17)	51 (11)	39 (4)	32 (0)	50 (10)
Average precipitation inches (mm)	0.9 (23)	1.3 (33)	1.9 (48)	3.1 (79)	5.7 (140)	3.7 (94)	3.2 (81)	2.4 (61)	3.8 (97)	2.5 (64)	1.6 (41)	1.4 (36)	30.5 (770)
Source: The Weather Channel Weatherbase.com

== Demographics ==
Historical population
Census	Pop.	Note	%±
1950	2,504		—
1960	12,934		416.5%
1970	27,133		109.8%
1980	28,523		5.1%
1990	23,928		−16.1%
2000	22,128		−7.5%
2010	21,332		−3.6%
2020	21,822		2.3%

=== 2020 census ===
As of the 2020 census, Del City had a population of 21,822. The median age was 36.1 years. 25.3% of residents were under the age of 18 and 15.2% of residents were 65 years of age or older. For every 100 females there were 93.4 males, and for every 100 females age 18 and over there were 87.6 males age 18 and over.

One hundred percent of residents lived in urban areas, while zero percent lived in rural areas.

There were 8,835 households in Del City, of which 31.8% had children under the age of 18 living in them. Of all households, 33.7% were married-couple households, 22.2% were households with a male householder and no spouse or partner present, and 35.8% were households with a female householder and no spouse or partner present. About 31.7% of all households were made up of individuals and 12.8% had someone living alone who was 65 years of age or older.

There were 9,746 housing units, of which 9.3% were vacant. Among occupied housing units, 54.7% were owner-occupied and 45.3% were renter-occupied. The homeowner vacancy rate was 1.5% and the rental vacancy rate was 11.3%.

Racial composition as of the 2020 census
Race	Percent
White	52.9%
Black or African American	21.9%
American Indian and Alaska Native	4.3%
Asian	1.8%
Native Hawaiian and Other Pacific Islander	0.2%
Some other race	5.4%
Two or more races	13.5%
Hispanic or Latino (of any race)	12.7%

=== 2010 census ===
At the 2010 census, there were 21,332 people living in the city. The population of the city peaked at 28,523 in 1980, just before the oil bust and subsequent economic downturn. The population was 66.04 percent white, 17.07 percent African American, 4.03 percent Native American, 1.06 percent Asian, 0.02 percent Pacific Islander, and 7.06 percent of mixed race. Hispanics or Latinos of any race made up 7.02 percent of the population.

There were 8,669 households and 5,538 families in the city in 2010. There were 9,580 housing units at an average density of 1,290.2 per square mile (498.1/km^{2}). Of those 8,669 households, 27.6 percent had children under the age of 18, 38.9 percent were headed by married couples living together, 18.8 percent were headed by a female householder with no husband present, and 36.1 percent were non-families. 27.2 percent of all households were made up of individuals, and 2.9 percent had someone living alone who was 65 years of age or older. The average household size was 2.45 and the average family size was 3.04.

In 2010, 26.1 percent of the population were under the age of 18, 9.01 percent from 18 to 24, 26.0 percent from 25 to 44, 24.1% from 45 to 64, and 14.7 percent who were 65 years of age or older. The median age was 35 years. For every 100 females, there were 89.0 males. For every 100 females age 18 and over, there were 84.6 males.

The median household income was $32,218 and the median family income was $36,515. Males had a median income of $28,806 versus $21,997 for females. The per capita income for the city was $15,717. About 10.5 percent of families and 13.3% of the population were below the poverty line, including 20.8 percent of those under age 18 and 7.2 percent of those age 65 or over.

=== 2000 census ===
In 2000, the population density was 2,935.8 inhabitants per square mile (1,133.5/km^{2}).

== Government ==
The City of Del City has operated under a council-manager form of city government since 1959. Greg Childers was sworn in as Mayor on April 20, 2026. Four councilpersons represent each of the four wards of Del City. The city manager is currently held by J.D. Hock. The Del City Police Department is headed by Police Chief Steven Stogner and is staffed by 34 full-time officers. The Del City Fire Department is headed by Fire Chief Zion Williams and is staffed by 30 full-time firefighters.

== Economy ==
Del City borders Tinker Air Force Base, the largest single-site employer in Oklahoma. Other major employers in the area include Rose State College, AllianceHealth Midwest, base-affiliated companies and many of the major employers in the Oklahoma City metropolitan area.

== Education ==
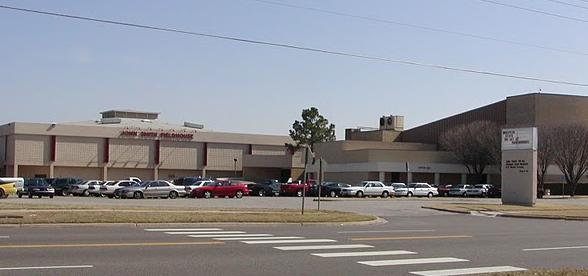
Del City High School

The Mid-Del School District provides education in almost all of Del City, with one high school (Del City High School), one middle school (Del City Middle School), three elementary schools (Del City Elementary School, Epperly Heights Elementary School and Townsend Elementary School) located in Del City.

A small portion of Del City is in Oklahoma City Public Schools (OKCPS). Zoned schools of the OKCPS portion are: Bodine Elementary School, Webster Middle School, and Capitol Hill High School.

Del City also has three private schools (Destiny Christian School, Cristo Rey, and Christian Heritage Academy). Rose State Community College is located within 15 miles (24 km) of Del City.

== Arts and culture ==
=== Annual cultural events ===
An annual Armed Forces Day Parade is put on by the city and Shriners in May each year.

=== Museums and other points of interest ===
Historical exhibits can be found at the Oklahoma County & Western Museum, Del City Preservation & Historical Society, and War Memorial. The Oklahoma Country Western Music Hall of Fame hosts regular bluegrass and country events.

==== War memorial ====
The war memorial located opposite the Del City Community Center has several monuments dedicated to those who were killed in combat who were either born or lived in Del City. The memorial is dedicated to twenty one servicemen killed while serving in various branches of the U.S. Military during World War II, the Vietnam War and the Iraq War. Dedicated in November 2010, the memorials include an armored personnel carrier and a Fallen Soldier Battle Cross being watched over by two crouched U.S. servicemen. The memorial also has a time capsule.

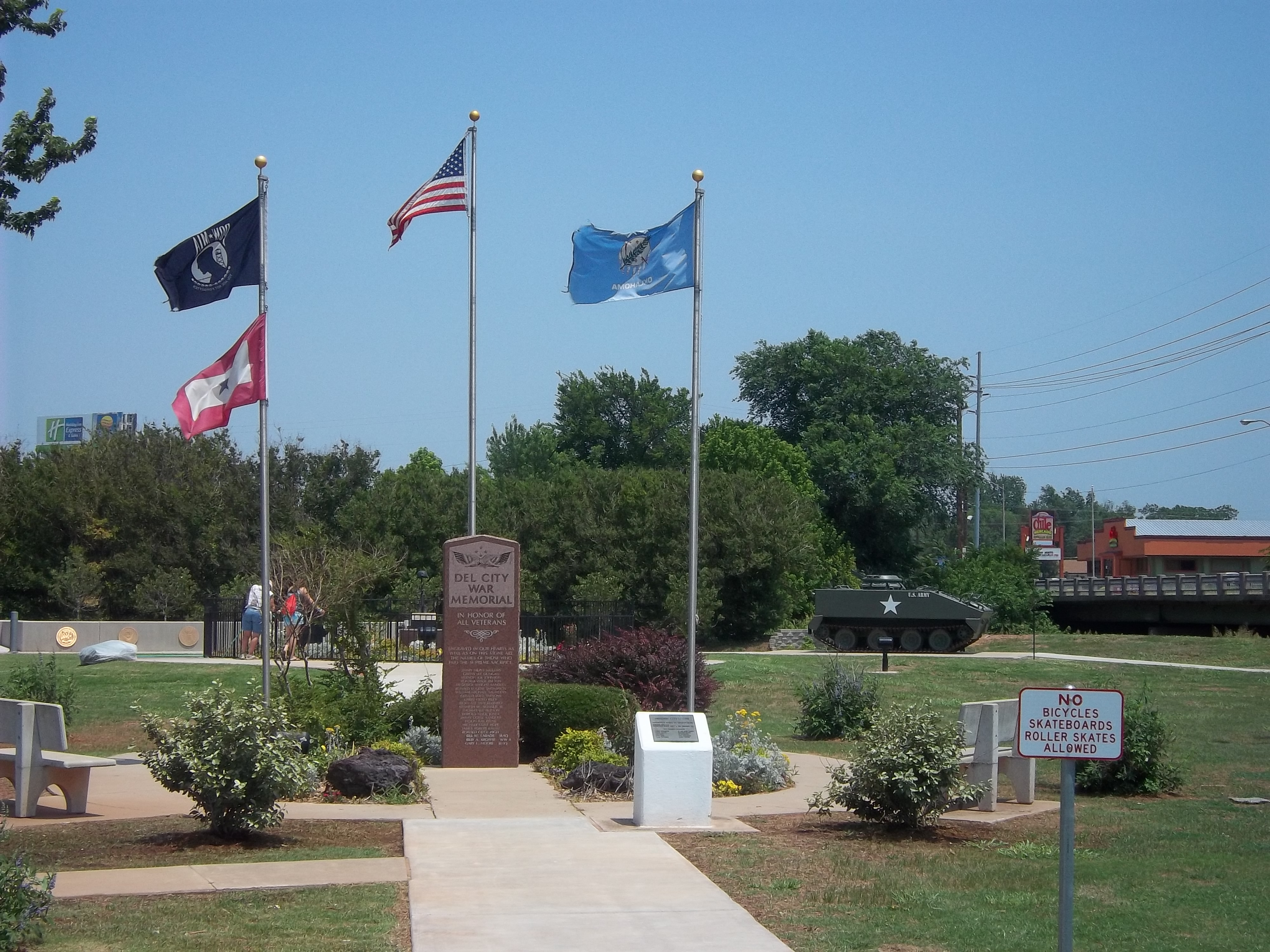
Del City war memorial

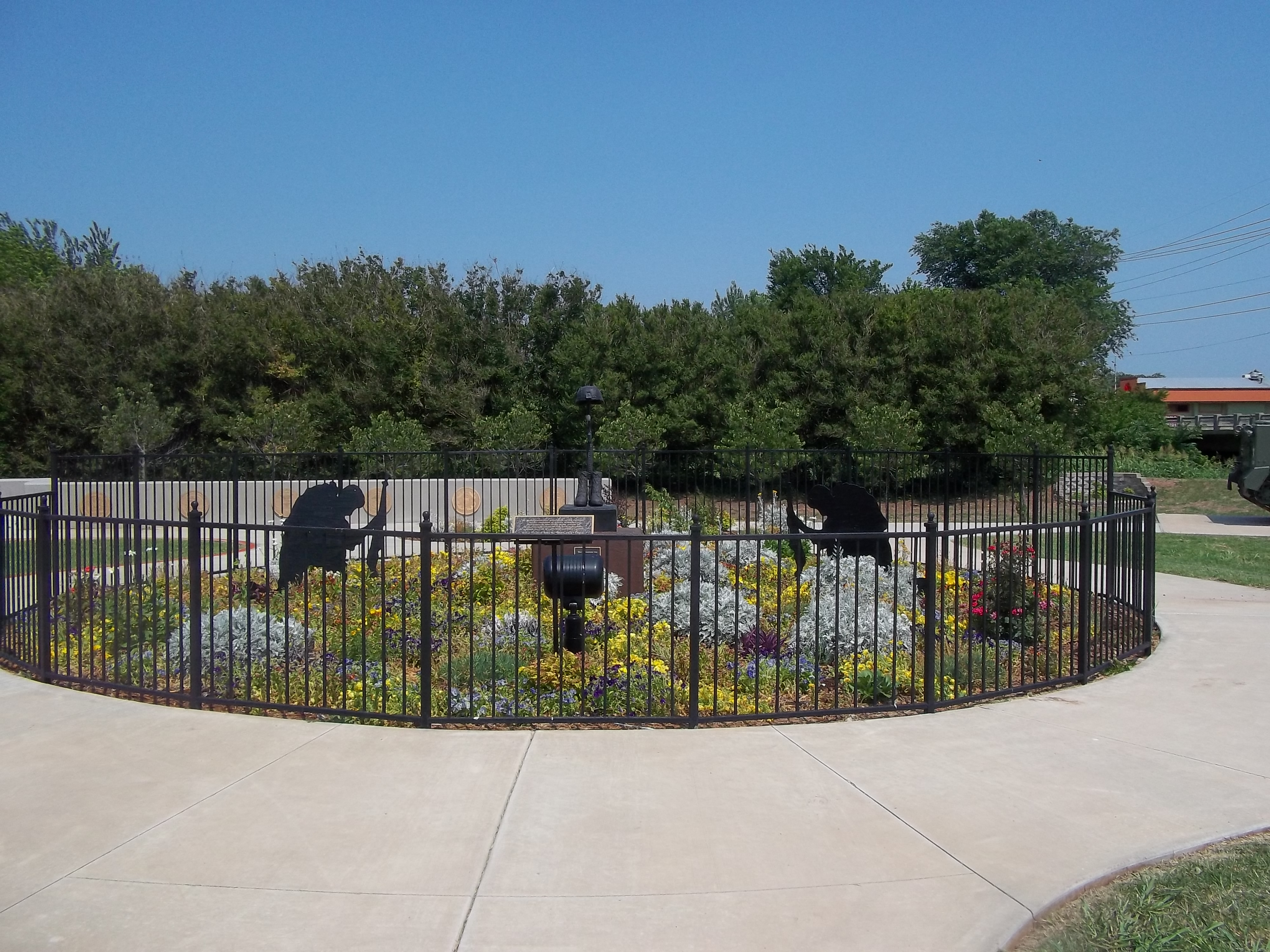
Fallen Soldier Battle Cross

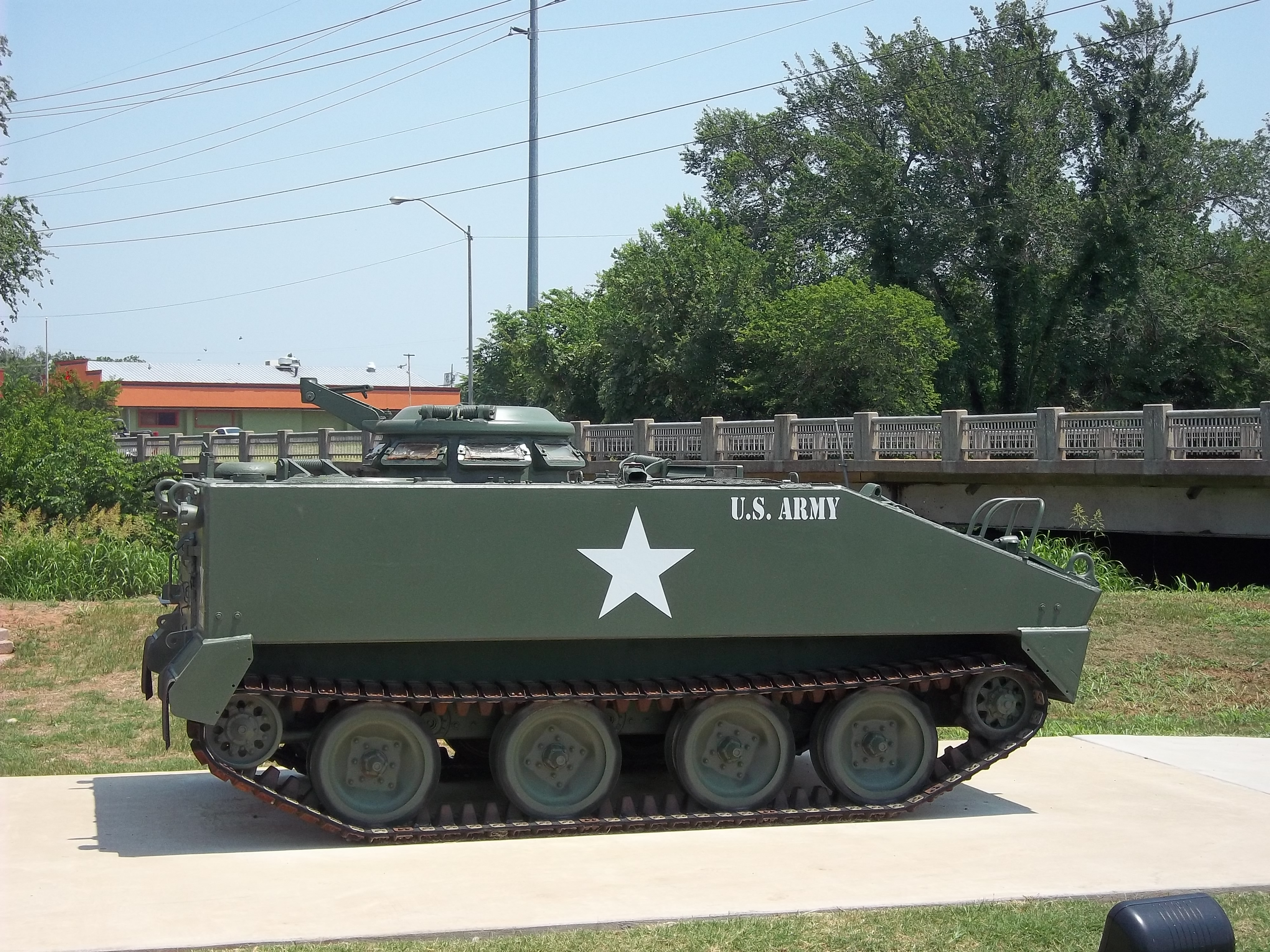
Armored personnel carrier

== Parks and recreation ==
Outdoor recreational areas include the Del City Ball Park, three bicycle and pedestrian trails, and Eagle Lake. The Eagle Harbor Aquatic Center water park is located behind the community center.

== Religion ==
Del City's largest church, St. Paul the Apostle Catholic Church, was founded in 1956 as the St. Francis Xavier Church. The parish had grown to 340 families by 1966 and broke ground on a new building on 10 acres (40,000 m^{2}) along Sunnylane Road. Its name was changed to St. Paul the Apostle Catholic Church in 1967.

== 1999 tornado ==
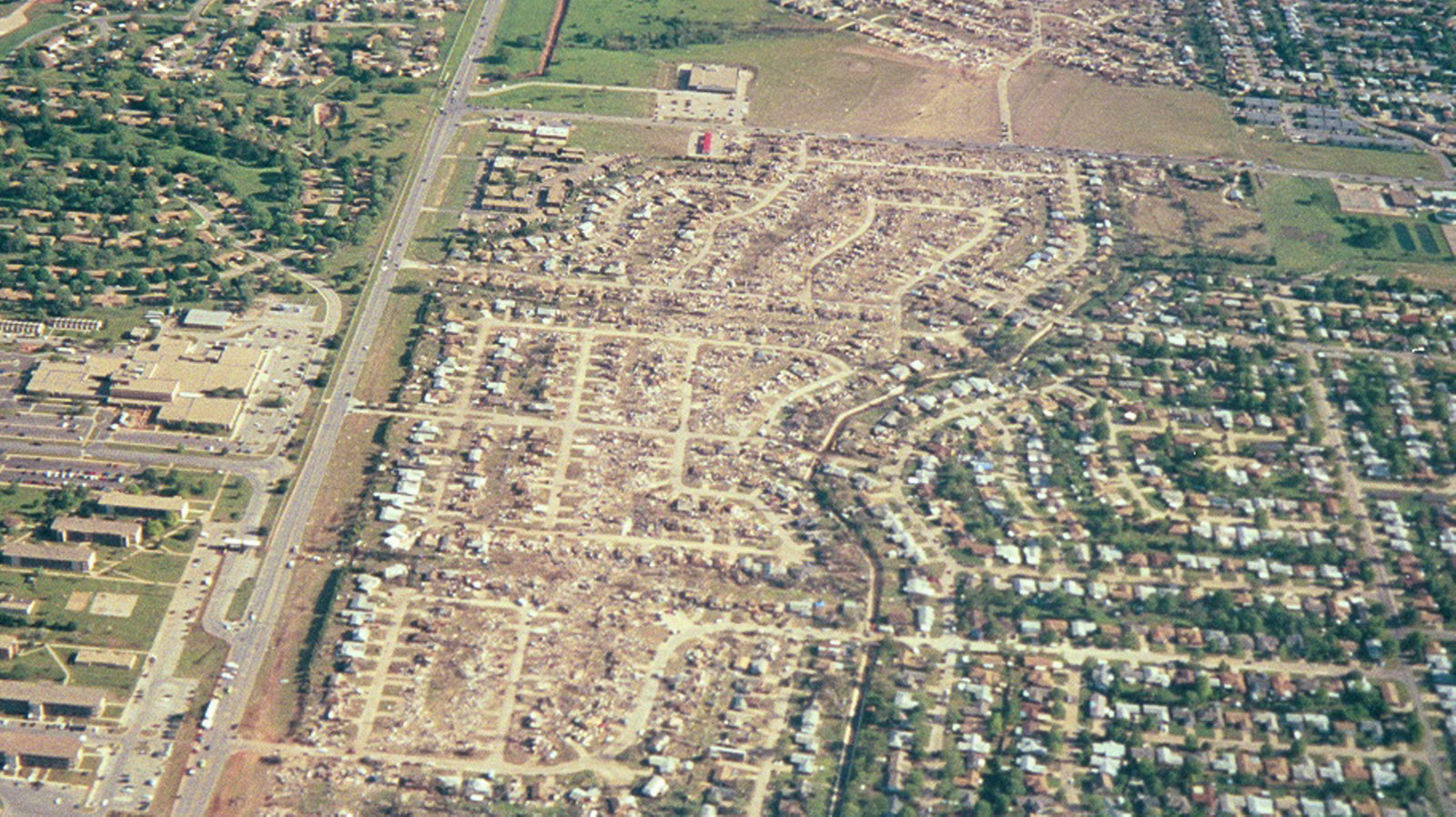
Aerial view of Del City after the tornado

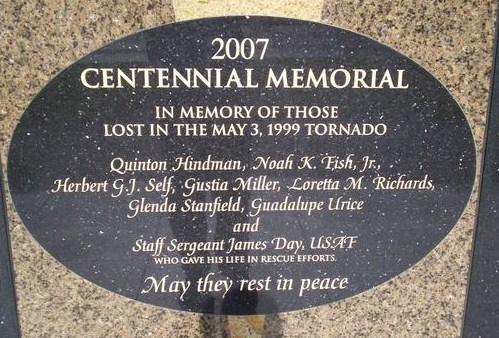
Tornado victims' memorial

A large area of Del City was significantly damaged by the Bridge Creek–Moore F5 tornado that passed through the Oklahoma City metropolitan area on May 3, 1999. The tornado first touched down southwest of the community of Amber. The funnel was approximately a half-mile wide when it entered Del City as an F4 from the west near the intersection of S.E. 44th Street and Spiva Drive. The tornado continued on a north-northeast trajectory, exiting the city near Sooner Road and Woodview Drive. Hail and high winds were experienced by residents in the surrounding area. President Bill Clinton visited Del City and the surrounding areas a few days later to view the damage caused by the storm.

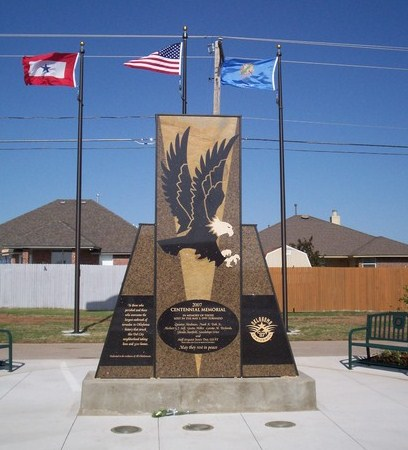
Tornado victims' Monument

The tornado was the last to be classified as an F5 tornado in the United States under the original Fujita scale system before the Enhanced Fujita Scale was implemented in February 2007. Even so, within a few years most of the area had been rebuilt. The only visible evidence of the tornado's path today include the cluster of newly constructed homes, the absence of large trees, and an interruption in the row of evergreen trees that lined Sooner Road between 44th Street and 29th Street.

A memorial stands along a walking and bike path on Sooner Road and is dedicated to the seven people who lost their lives during the May 3 tornado. United States Air Force Staff Sergeant James Day was killed in an ATV accident on May 8, 1999, while he was patrolling an area of Tinker AFB, Oklahoma, which had been damaged in the tornado. He is also listed on the memorial.

The tornado was the deadliest and most destructive of the numerous tornadoes that were part of the 1999 Oklahoma tornado outbreak. A 2006 National Geographic Channel documentary, Ultimate Tornado, discusses unusually violent tornado events and includes footage of the outbreak. The tornado ultimately claimed a total of 36 lives throughout the Oklahoma City metropolitan area.

== Notable people ==
- Nick Blackburn – Major League Baseball player, pitched for the Minnesota Twins from 2008 to 2011.
- Scott Inman – former Democratic Leader and member of the Oklahoma House of Representatives (2006–2018) grew up in Del City.
- Bob Kalsu – All-American tackle at the University of Oklahoma and NFL player for the Buffalo Bills, attended Del City High School. Kalsu was killed in action during the Vietnam War.
- J. T. Realmuto – Major League Baseball player for the Philadelphia Phillies
- Josh Scobey – former NFL player, later played for the UFL Las Vegas Locomotives football team.
- John Smith – two-time Olympic gold medalist (1988, 1992) and four-time World Champion in freestyle wrestling.
- Pat Smith – younger brother of John Smith, first ever four-time NCAA Division I National Wrestling Champion.

== See also ==
- List of towns and cities in Oklahoma by population
