= John Smith (American wrestler) =

American wrestler (born 1965)

Personal information
- Full name: John William Smith
- Born: August 9, 1965 (age 61) Del City, Oklahoma, U.S.
- Height: 5 ft 7 in (170 cm)
- Weight: 62 kg (137 lb)

Sport
- Country: United States
- Sport: Wrestling
- Weight class: 62 kg
- Events: Freestyle and Folkstyle
- College team: Oklahoma State
- Club: Sunkist Kids Wrestling Club
- Team: USA
Medal record
Men's freestyle wrestling
Representing the United States
Olympic Games
Gold medal – first place	1988 Seoul	62 kg
Gold medal – first place	1992 Barcelona	62 kg
World Championships
Gold medal – first place	1987 Clermont-Ferrand	62 kg
Gold medal – first place	1989 Martigny	62 kg
Gold medal – first place	1990 Tokyo	62 kg
Gold medal – first place	1991 Varna	62 kg
Goodwill Games
Gold medal – first place	1986 Moscow	62 kg
Gold medal – first place	1990 Seattle	62 kg
Pan American Games
Gold medal – first place	1987 Indianapolis	62 kg
Gold medal – first place	1991 Havana	62 kg
Men's collegiate wrestling
Representing the Oklahoma State Cowboys
NCAA Division I Championships
Gold medal – first place	1987 College Park	134 lb
Gold medal – first place	1988 Ames	134 lb
Silver medal – second place	1985 Oklahoma City	134 lb
Big 8 Championships
Gold medal – first place	1985 Norman	134 lb
Gold medal – first place	1987 Stillwater	134 lb
Gold medal – first place	1988 Norman	134 lb
Silver medal – second place	1984 Stillwater	126 lb

John William Smith (born August 9, 1965) is an American folkstyle and freestyle wrestler and coach. Smith was a two-time NCAA Division I national champion, and a six-time world level champion with two Olympic Championships and four World Wrestling Championships. Smith is the only American wrestler ever to win six consecutive World and Olympic championships as a competitor. At the end of his competitive career, Smith had won more World and Olympic gold medals in wrestling than any other American. Smith was widely known for his low single leg takedown, and is considered one of the greatest freestyle wrestlers of all time.

== Wrestling career ==
=== High School ===
Smith wrestled at Del City High School in Del City, Oklahoma. While in high school Smith had a 105–5 record, and was a two-time Oklahoma state champion.

=== College ===
Smith competed collegiately at Oklahoma State University. While at Oklahoma State, Smith's college career record was 154-7-2. At the NCAA Division I Wrestling Championships, Smith was a three-time national finalist and a two-time national champion. After losing in the 1985 finals to future US House representative Jim Jordan, he finished his college career with 90 consecutive victories.

=== Senior level ===
Beginning in his teenage years, Smith competed internationally in freestyle wrestling. Highlights of his freestyle career include winning four World gold medals, and two Olympic gold medals. At the Senior level, his international freestyle wrestling record was 100–5, with an overall record of 177–8. He is the only American wrestler to ever win six consecutive World and Olympic championships as a competitor.

== Coaching career ==
Smith became the head wrestling coach at Oklahoma State in 1991. During his tenure as head coach, Oklahoma State University won five NCAA Division I national team titles, winning in 1994, 2003, 2004, 2005, and 2006. His overall dual meet record was 490-73-6. He coached Oklahoma State wrestlers to a total of 33 NCAA Division I individual national championships and 153 All-American honors. Smith brought 23 team conference team titles to Stillwater as a coach as well. On April 11, 2024 he announced his retirement and departure from Oklahoma State. David Taylor was appointed as his successor.

== Awards and honors ==
1992

- (gold) Summer Olympics

1991

- (gold) World Wrestling Championships
- (gold) Pan American Games
- (gold) Pan American Championships

1990

- (gold) World Wrestling Championships
- (gold) 1990 Goodwill Games wrestling tournament
- (gold) Grand Masters of Olympic Wrestling
- UWW Master of Technique award winner
- Amateur Athletic Union James E. Sullivan Award winner

1989

- (gold) World Wrestling Championships

1988

- (gold) Summer Olympics
- (gold) NCAA Division I
- (gold) Big Eight Conference

1987

- (gold) World Wrestling Championships
- (gold) Pan American Games
- (gold) Pan American Championships
- (gold) NCAA Division I
- (gold) Big Eight Conference

1986

- (gold) Goodwill Games

1985

- (silver) NCAA Division I
- (gold) Big Eight Conference

=== Other honors ===
- Smith was inducted into the National Wrestling Hall of Fame as a Distinguished Member in 1997.
- He was inducted into the Oklahoma Sports Hall of Fame with the class of 1997.
- In 2020, Smith was inducted into the Oklahoma Hall of Fame.
- The high school Smith graduated from, Del City High School in Oklahoma, named its field house after him.
- Smith has a wrestling move named after him, the John Smith low single.

== Family ==
Smith's older brother Lee Roy Smith and younger brother Pat Smith were NCAA Division I wrestling national champions, with Pat being the sport's first ever four-time NCAA Division I national champion. Smith's youngest brother, Mark, was also a successful NCAA Division I wrestler, having placed in the top five nationally three times. Smith's nephews Mark Perry and Chris Perry were also NCAA Division I national champions. His son, Joe Smith, earned NCAA All-American honors twice while wrestling at Oklahoma State during his tenure as head coach. Another nephew of Smith, J. T. Realmuto, is a Major League Baseball All-Star catcher.

== See also ==
- List of Oklahoma State University Olympians

== Bibliography ==
- Dellinger, Bob & Doris. 1994. The Cowboys Ride Again. Oklahoma Bylines Inc. ISBN 978-1-882336-04-3
- Zavoral, Nolan. 1997. A Season on the Mat. Simon & Schuster. ISBN 978-0-684-84787-0
- Hammond, Jairus K. 2005. The History of Collegiate Wrestling. National Wrestling Hall of Fame and Museum. ISBN 978-0-9765064-0-9
- Moffat, James V. 2007. Wrestlers At The Trials. Exit Zero Publishing. ISBN 978-0-9799051-0-0
- Parrish, Kim D. 2007. Cowboy Up. Oklahoma Heritage Association. ISBN 978-1-885596-61-1
