= Oklahoma Association of Student Councils =

Oklahoma Association of Student Councils (OASC) is an educational, not-for-profit organization which organizes state student councils. Its mission is to provide educational leadership training and opportunities for students and sponsors of member schools. The OASC is sponsored by the Oklahoma Association of Secondary School Principals.

== General information ==
The Oklahoma Association of Student Councils is composed of 14 districts across the state of Oklahoma. The OASC sponsors a variety of activities that are available to all member schools. Activities include an annual convention held at an elected secretary's school, summer workshops, fall advisor's workshops, and additional leadership opportunities.

The OASC's governing body is composed of an executive board consisting of an Executive Director, a 3rd-Year Advisor, a 2nd-Year Advisor, and a 1st-Year Advisor as well as three state officers.

== Camps ==
The OASC hosts the Basic Leadership camp twice each summer for student leaders who will be sophomores, juniors, or seniors at member schools. Basic is offered in both June and July at Northwestern Oklahoma State University in Alva, Oklahoma. "Students will be divided into 10 councils where they will come up with a school name, mascot, colors and a school song and yell. They also will participate in breakout sessions that will include leadership styles, team building, etiquette, school spirit and activities. The group also will be having a banquet" and a mixer.

The OASC hosts the Advanced Leadership Camp four times each summer for student leaders who will be seniors at member schools and have previously attended Basic. Advanced is offered twice in June and twice in July on the campus of the University of Oklahoma in Norman. Advanced offers small-group leadership and team-building activities. Delegates also participate in a high ropes course.

== Conventions ==
The OASC State Convention is held each November at the State Secretary's school. Each year, member schools send delegates to the convention to enhance their leadership skills, hear motivational speakers and network with other student leaders from throughout the state.

The OASC is affiliated with the National Association of Student Councils, which hosts a national student council convention each summer.
