= Iowa State Cyclones Hall of Fame =

Recognizes former Iowa State University student athletes

The Iowa State Cyclones Hall of Fame is a hall of fame that recognizes former student-athletes that achieved great success during their time at Iowa State University over the past 120 years.

== History ==
The Hall of Fame was first created in 1997. Since the program's inception in 1997, there have been 161 individuals inducted.

== Induction process ==
Former student-athletes can be nominated by either athletic department employees or members of the Letterwinners Club. A nominated committee is selected by the Letterwinners Club executive committee who then selects members for induction. A varying number of members are inducted each year.

Each fall during Letterwinners Weekend, the Iowa State Letterwinners Club hosts the Iowa State University Athletics Hall of Fame induction ceremony. Inductees are honored at a Friday night banquet at which each honoree is presented a medallion and given the opportunity to speak and they are then honored at halftime of the football game the following day.

== Members ==
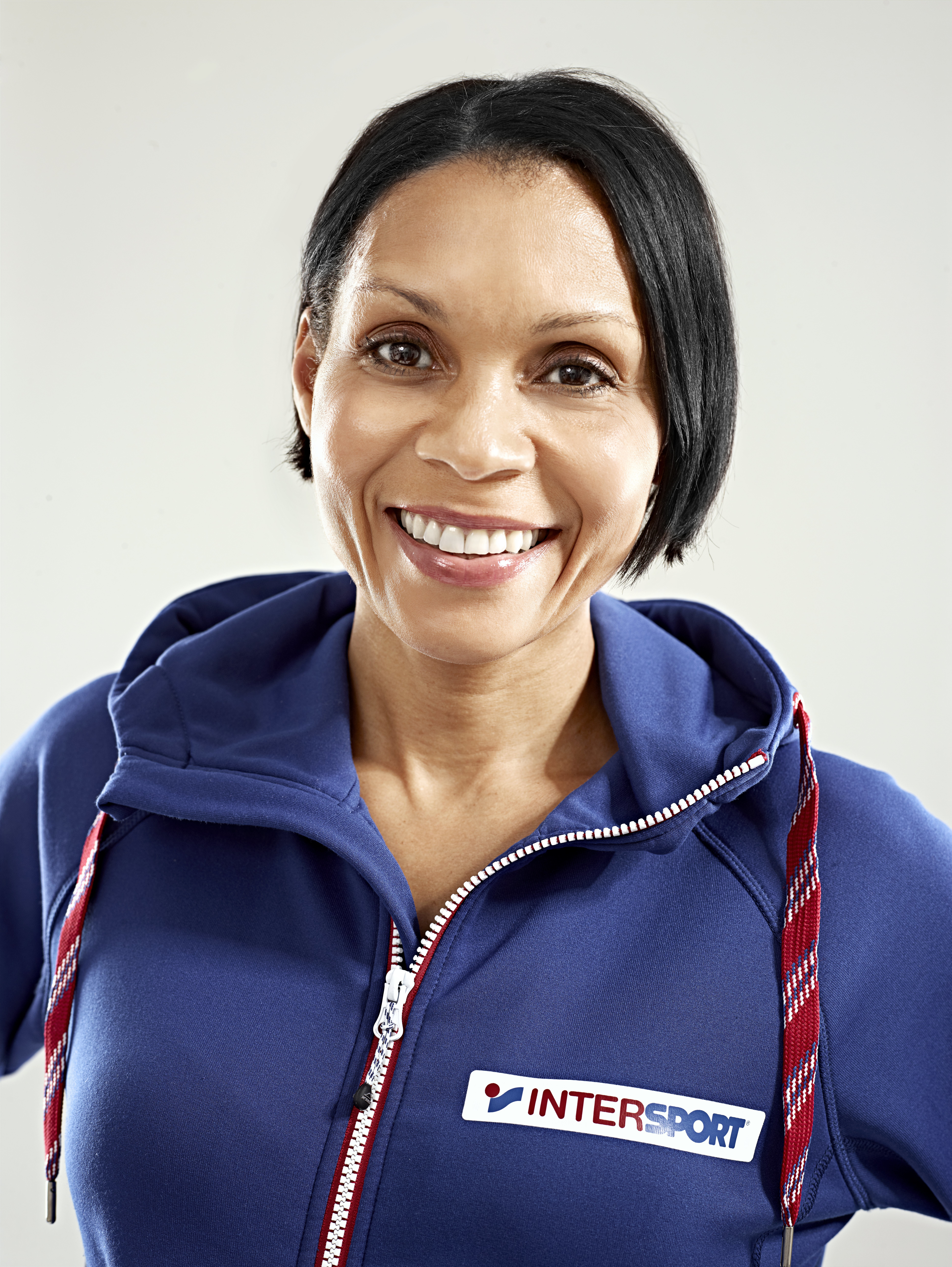
Maria Akraka (2010)

Richard Barker (2002)

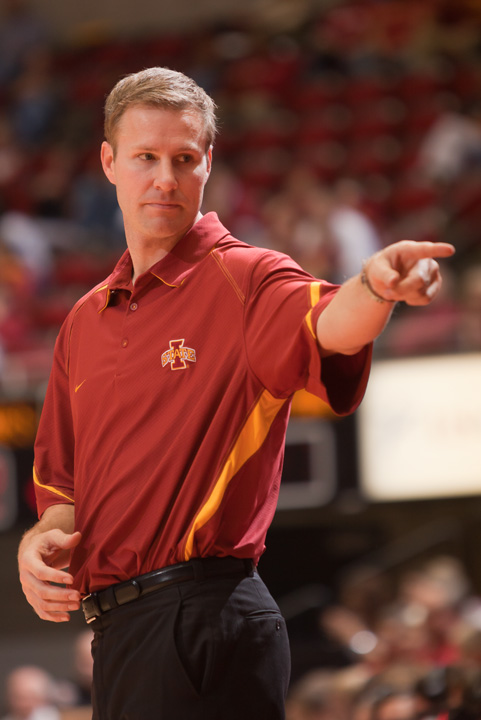
Fred Hoiberg (2005)

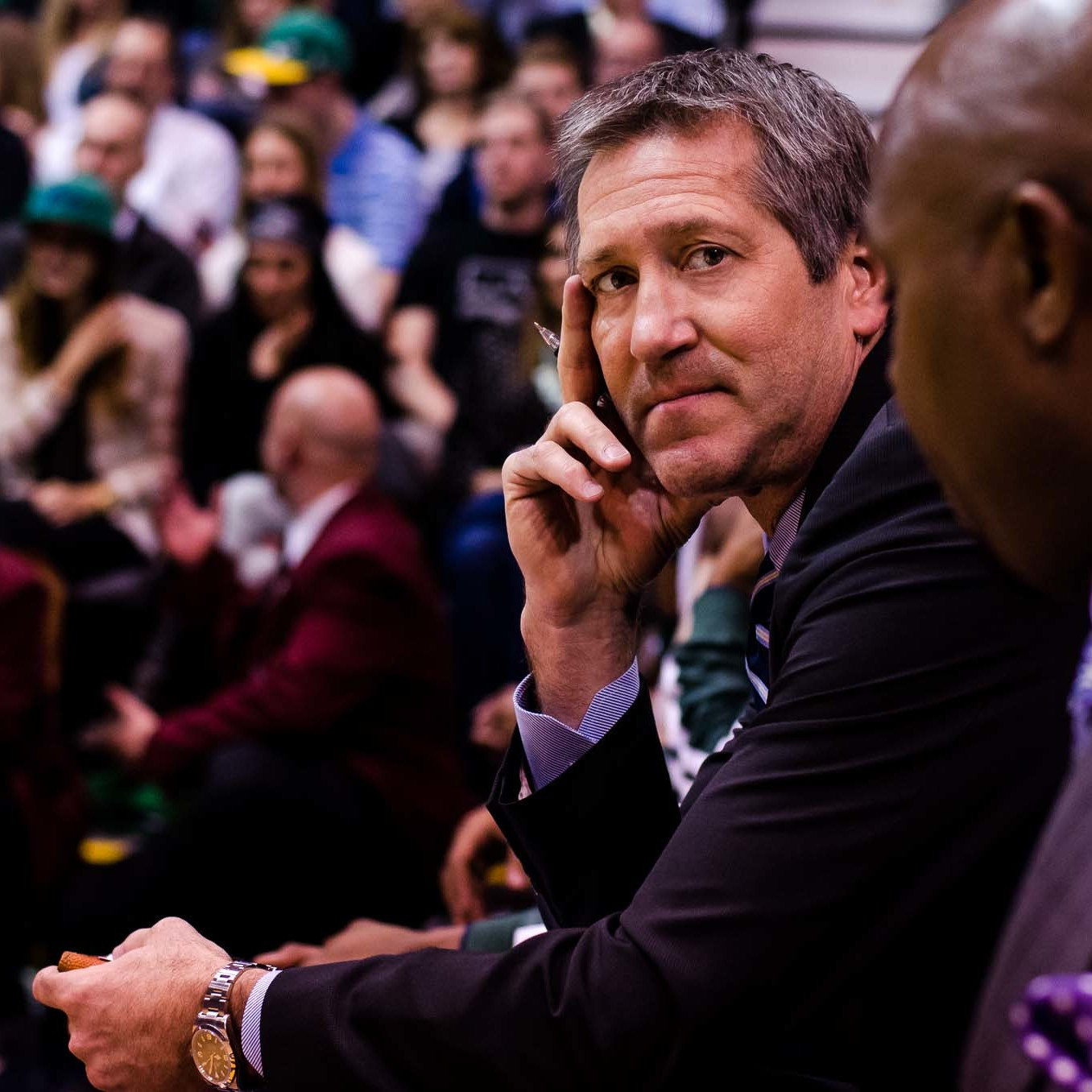
Jeff Hornacek (1999)

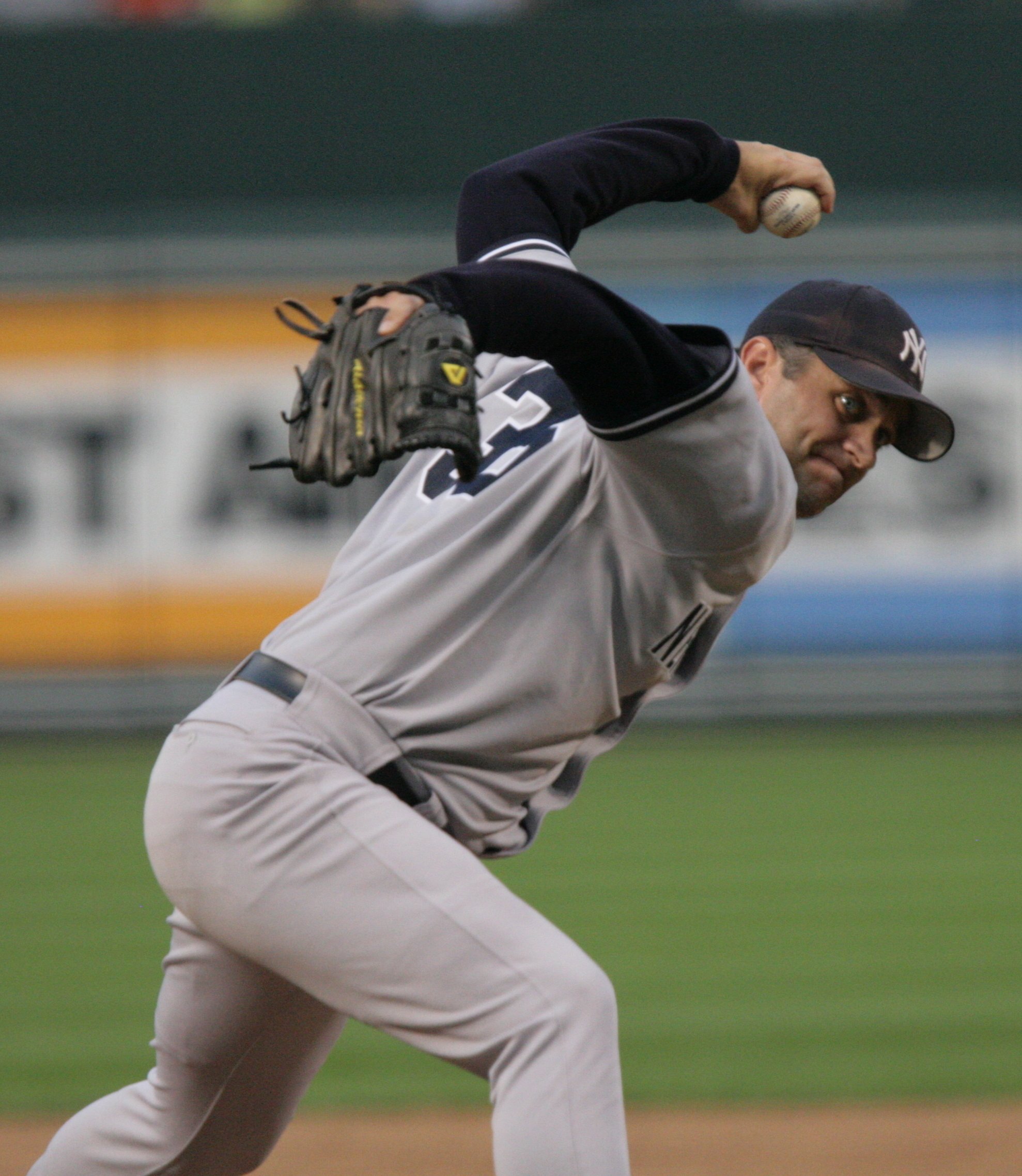
Mike Myers (2013)

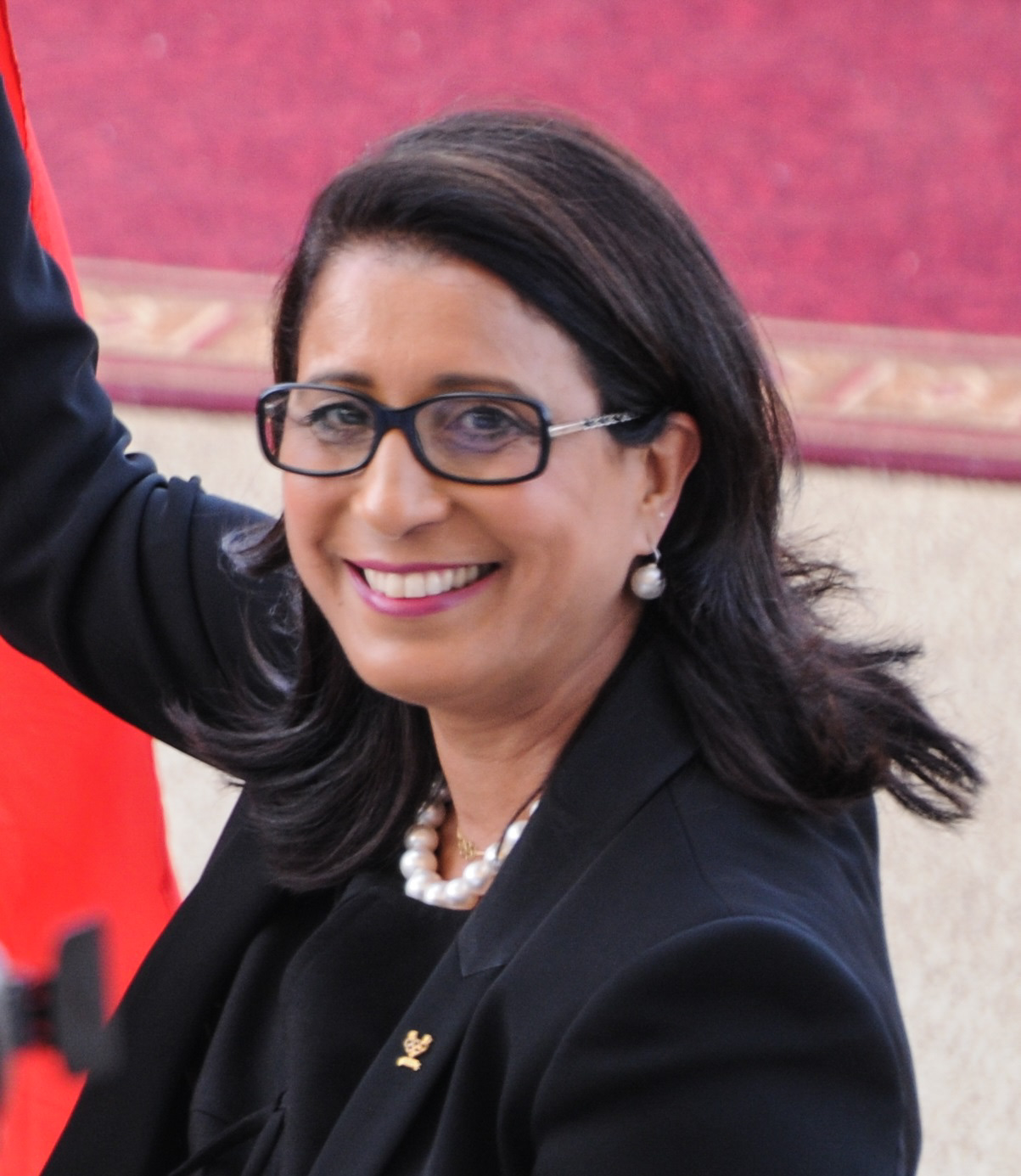
Nawal El Moutawakel (1997)

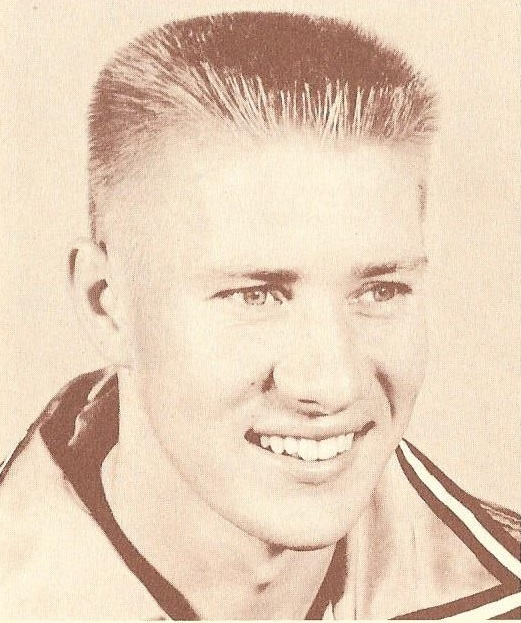
Gary Thompson (1997)

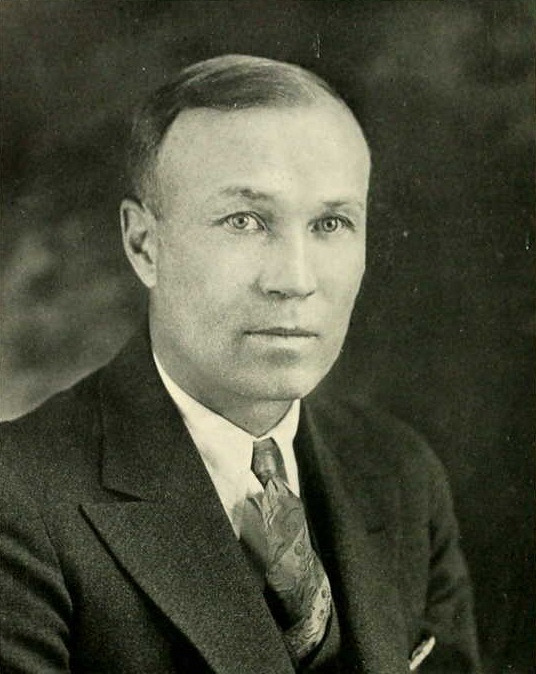
George Veenker (2007)

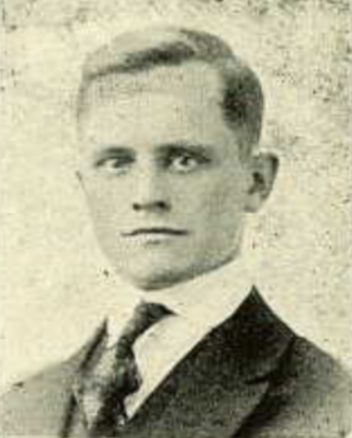
Polly Wallace (2000)

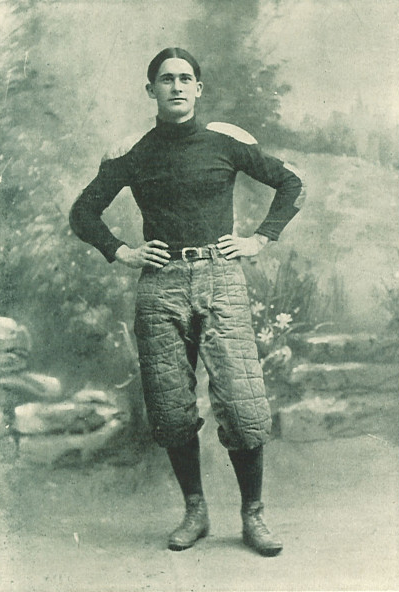
Clyde Williams (1997)

Iowa State Athletics Hall of Fame
| Name | Sport | Induction | Notes |
|---|---|---|---|
| Zaid Abdul-Aziz | Basketball | 1998 | |
| Carl Adams | Wrestling | 2005 | |
| Jenni Adams | Swimming & Diving | 2007 | |
| Maria Akraka | Cross Country/Track & Field | 2010 | |
| Victor Alexander | Basketball | 2017 | |
| George Amundson | Football/Track & Field | 1998 | |
| Les Anderson | Wrestling | 2004 | |
| Janet Anson | Gymnastics | 2020 | |
| David Archer | Football | 2005 | |
| Beth Bader | Golf | 2006 | |
| Dale Bahr | Wrestling | 2015 | |
| Chris Baker | Golf | 2026 | |
| Richard Barker | Football/Wrestling | 2002 | |
| Eppie Barney | Football | 2009 | |
| Bill Bergan | Cross Country/Track & Field | 2001 | Coach |
| Dick Bertell | Baseball | 2000 | |
| Jamie Beyer | Track & Field | 2018 | |
| Samuel Beyer | Administration | 2012 | |
| Rich Binek | Wrestling | 2024 | |
| Matt Blair | Football | 1999 | Iowa Sports Hall of Fame |
| Luther Blue | Football | 2007 | |
| Ed Bock | Football | 1997 | College Football Hall of Fame |
| Chris Bono | Wrestling | 2025 | |
| Glen Brand | Wrestling | 1998 | |
| Carl Brettschneider | Football | 2012 | |
| Jon Brown | Cross Country/Track & Field | 2006 | |
| Earle Bruce | Football | 2000 | Coach |
| Al Budolfson | Basketball | 2003 | |
| Tonya Burns | Basketball | 2000 | |
| Harry Burrell | Administration | 1999 | |
| Mike Busch | Football/Baseball | 2000 | |
| Bill Cain | Basketball | 2002 | |
| Nate Carr | Wrestling | 2000 | National Wrestling Hall of Fame; Bronze Medalist at the 1988 Olympics |
| Cathy Carroll | Track & Field | 2008 | |
| Steve Carson | Track & Field | 2008 | |
| Jenny Condon | Softball | 2003 | Gold Medalist at the 1995 Pan American Games |
| Ray Conger | Cross Country/Track & Field | 1999 | Iowa Sports Hall of Fame |
| Carol Cook | Cross Country/Track & Field | 2002 | |
| John Cooper | Football | 2014 | College Football Hall of Fame |
| Larry Corrigan | Baseball | 2004 | |
| John Crawford | Basketball | 2006 | |
| Scott Crowell | Track & Field | 2005 | |
| Dwayne Crutchfield | Football | 2017 | |
| Gina Curtis-Rickert | Track & Field | 2019 | |
| Kevin Darkus | Wrestling | 2012 | Silver Medalist at the 1985 World Championships |
| Troy Davis | Football | 2007 | College Football Hall of Fame |
| Erin Dethloff | Gymnastics | 2025 | |
| Mark Diab | Gymnastics | 2016 | |
| Diane Doles | Volleyball | 2002 | |
| Jim Doran | Football | 1997 | |
| Bobby Douglas | Wrestling | 2023 | National Wrestling Hall of Fame |
| Dmitry Drozdov | Cross Country/Track & Field | 2012 | |
| Randy Duarte | Baseball | 2014 | |
| Melvin Ejim | Basketball | 2024 | |
| Nawal El Moutawakel | Track & Field | 1997 | Gold Medalist at the 1984 Olympics; Iowa Sports Hall of Fame |
| Obinna Eregbu | Track & Field | 2010 | |
| Debbie Esser | Track & Field | 1998 | |
| Linda Evans | Volleyball | 2009 | |
| Shelley Finnestad | Golf | 2005 | |
| Doug Fitzjarrell | Gymnastics | 2013 | |
| Marcus Fizer | Basketball | 2015 | |
| Jack Flemming | Basketball | 2019 | |
| Tim Floyd | Basketball | 2011 | Coach |
| Stacy Frese | Basketball | 2015 | |
| Dan Gable | Wrestling | 1997 | Gold Medalist at the 1972 Olympics; USA Wrestling Hall of Fame; National Wrestling Hall of Fame; USA Olympics Hall of Fame; Iowa Sports Hall of Fame |
| Ed Gagnier | Gymnastics | 1998 | Coach; USA Gymnastics Hall of Fame |
| Ron Galimore | Gymnastics | 1997 | First gymnast to register a perfect "10.0" |
| Joan Gearhart | Golf | 2023 | Coach |
| Jim Gibbons | Wrestling | 2002 | |
| Joe Gibbons | Wrestling | 2009 | |
| Dennis Gibson | Football | 2018 | |
| Karen Glerum | Track & Field | 2003 | |
| Ron Gray | Wrestling | 2005 | |
| Jeff Grayer | Basketball | 1999 | |
| Dexter Green | Football | 2000 | |
| Reese Greene | Basketball/Football/Track & Field | 2010 | |
| Lisa Griebel | Track & Field | 2018 | |
| Karen Groth | Swimming & Diving | 2018 | |
| Eric Hansen | Swimming & Diving | 2004 | Gold Medalist at 1987 World Games |
| Danny Harris | Track & Field | 2000 | Silver Medalist at the 1984 Olympics |
| Ike Harris | Football | 2007 | |
| Gordan Hassman | Wrestling | 2013 | |
| Ike Hayes | Football | 2017 | |
| Larry Hayes | Wrestling | 2001 | |
| Reggie Hayward | Football | 2022 | |
| Keith Heaver | Gymnastics | 2009 | |
| Victoria Henson | Volleyball | 2024 | |
| Joe Heskett | Wrestling | 2022 | |
| Robert Hess | Wrestling | 2008 | |
| Elaine Hieber | Administration | 2008 | |
| Barry Hill | Football | 2006 | |
| Christina Hillman | Track & Field | 2026 | |
| Pat Hodgson | Basketball/Track & Field | 2004 | |
| Russ Hoffman | Gymnastics | 2006 | |
| Fred Hoiberg | Basketball | 2005 | |
| Arthur Holding | Wrestling | 2016 | |
| Dave Hoppmann | Football | 2001 | |
| Jeff Hornacek | Basketball | 1999 | |
| Kirstin Hugdahl | Volleyball | 2010 | |
| Lawrence Hunt | Football | 2026 | |
| Hercle Ivy | Basketball | 2023 | |
| Mike Jacki | Gymnastics | 2014 | USA Gymnastics Hall of Fame |
| Kevin Jackson | Wrestling | 2007 | |
| Edward Kemboi | Cross Country/Track & Field | 2026 | |
| Everett Kischer | Football | 2011 | |
| A. J. Klein | Football | 2025 | |
| Jason Knutzon | Golf | 2019 | |
| Jonah Koech | Cross Country/Track & Field | 2003 | |
| Lisa Koll | Cross Country/Track & Field | 2020 | |
| Barnaba Korir | Cross Country/Track & Field | 2019 | |
| Merv Krakau | Football | 2007 | |
| Keith Krepfle | Football | 2002 | |
| Tim Krieger | Wrestling | 2003 | |
| Alison Lacey | Basketball | 2022 | |
| Mike Land | Wrestling | 2007 | |
| Richard Larson | Gymnastics | 2025 | |
| Bob Locker | Baseball | 2008 | |
| Veryl Long | Wrestling | 2013 | |
| Johnny Majors | Football | 1999 | |
| Kaylee Manns | Volleyball | 2020 | |
| Vic Marcucci | Wrestling | 2014 | |
| Dave Martin | Wrestling | 2018 | |
| George Martin | Wrestling | 2015 | |
| Erica Martinez | Softball | 2025 | |
| Ashley Mass | Volleyball | 2022 | |
| Dennis Mazur | Gymnastics | 2023 | |
| Kim Mazza | Gymnastics | 2013 | |
| Scott McCadam | Swimming & Diving | 2003 | |
| Steph McCannon | Volleyball | 2011 | |
| Dan McCarney | Football | 2016 | Coach |
| Jack McGuire | Swimming & Diving/Golf | 2001 | |
| Jerry McNertney | Baseball | 2006 | |
| Lyndsey Medders | Basketball | 2024 | |
| Louis Menze | Basketball/Baseball/Administration | 1998 | Namesake of the Iowa State Athletics Hall of Fame |
| Ward Meythaler | Gymnastics | 2020 | |
| Geary Murdock | Football/Wrestling | 2017 | |
| Chris Murray | Cross Country/Track & Field | 2000 | Coach |
| Jeff Myers | Cross Country/Track & Field | 2015 | |
| Mike Myers | Baseball | 2013 | World Series Champion (2004) |
| Al Nacin | Wrestling | 2008 | |
| Edith Nakiyingi | Cross Country/Track & Field | 2001 | |
| Karl Nelson | Football | 2005 | Super Bowl Champion (XXI) |
| Peg Neppel | Cross Country/Track & Field | 1998 | |
| Georges Niang | Basketball | 2026 | |
| Dwight Nichols | Football | 1999 | |
| Harold Nichols | Wrestling | 1997 | |
| John Nuttall | Cross Country/Track & Field | 2001 | |
| Jayme Olson | Basketball | 2014 | |
| Yobes Ondieki | Cross Country/Track & Field | 1997 | Gold Medalist at 1991 World Championships |
| Kelechi Osemele | Football | 2024 | Super Bowl Champion (XLVII) |
| Johnny Orr | Basketball | 2001 | |
| Hugo Otopalik | Wrestling/Golf/Administration | 2006 | |
| Andrew Parker | Basketball | 2012 | |
| Tom Peckham | Wrestling | 2004 | |
| Faye Perkins | Track & Field/Softball/Basketball | 2004 | |
| Ben Peterson | Wrestling | 1998 | Gold Medalist at the 1972 Olympics; Silver Medalist at the 1976 Olympics |
| Frank Randall | Administration | 2008 | |
| Tom Randall | Football | 2011 | |
| Bruce Reimers | Football | 2009 | |
| Ron Renko | Cross Country/Track & Field | 2005 | Coach |
| Marcus Robertson | Football | 2008 | |
| Merl Ross | Administration | 2009 | |
| Tammy Rueckert | Softball | 2010 | |
| Betsy Saina | Cross Country/Track & Field | 2023 | |
| Cael Sanderson | Wrestling | 2017 | Gold Medalist at the 2004 Olympics |
| Frank Santana | Wrestling | 2010 | |
| Jay Schindler | Swimming & Diving | 2026 | |
| Mal Schmidt | Football/Swimming & Diving/Administration | 2002 | |
| Clyde Shugart | Football | 2004 | |
| Brent Simmons | Gymnastics | 2002 | |
| Keith Sims | Football | 2006 | |
| Gene Smith | Administration | 2025 | |
| Jason Smith | Wrestling | 2007 | |
| Steve Spikes | Swimming & Diving | 2010 | |
| Clay Stapleton | Football/Administration | 2006 | |
| Mike Stensrud | Football | 2000 | |
| Barry Stevens | Basketball | 2004 | |
| Mike Strachan | Football | 2023 | |
| Lee-Jay Strifler | Swimming & Diving | 2017 | |
| Otto Stowe | Football | 2008 | |
| Bill Strannigan | Basketball | 2005 | Coach |
| Chris Taylor | Wrestling | 1999 | Bronze Medalist at the 1972 Olympics |
| Pete Taylor | Administration | 2003 | |
| Megan Taylor | Basketball | 2016 | |
| Gary Thompson | Basketball/Baseball | 1997 | |
| Brian Tietjens | Track & Field | 2004 | |
| Winifred Tilden | Administration | 2006 | |
| Cap Timm | Baseball | 1997 | National College Baseball Hall of Fame |
| Jamaal Tinsley | Basketball | 2016 | |
| Max Urick | Administration | 2018 | |
| Dean Uthoff | Basketball | 2022 | |
| Sunday Uti | Track & Field | 2002 | Bronze Medalist at the 1984 Olympics |
| Mike van Arsdale | Wrestling | 2024 | |
| Tim Van Galder | Football/Baseball | 2015 | |
| John Vansicklen | Football | 2014 | |
| Tom Vantiger | Baseball | 2004 | |
| Jake Varner | Wrestling | 2020 | |
| Tom Vaughn | Football | 2005 | |
| George Veenker | Football/Administration | 2007 | |
| Bob Verbeeck | Cross Country/Track & Field | 2003 | |
| Debbie Vetter | Cross Country/Track & Field | 1999 | |
| Diane Vetter | Cross Country/Track & Field | 2012 | |
| Eric Voelker | Wrestling | 2010 | |
| Polly Wallace | Football/Wrestling | 2000 | |
| Seneca Wallace | Football | 2019 | |
| Kelly Ward | Wrestling | 2011 | |
| Chris Washington | Football | 2009 | |
| Tom Watkins | Football | 2002 | |
| Roger Watts | Swimming & Diving | 2013 | |
| Bill Weeks | Football | 2022 | |
| Waldo Wegner | Basketball/Baseball | 1998 | |
| Ray Wehde | Baseball/Track & Field | 2010 | |
| Angie Welle | Basketball | 2017 | |
| Don Wengert | Baseball | 2019 | |
| Hank Whitney | Basketball | 2018 | |
| Reg Wicks | Wrestling | 2016 | |
| Clyde Williams | Football/Baseball/Administration | 1997 | |
| Gene Williams | Football | 2012 | |
| Dedric Willoughby | Basketball | 2012 | |
| Deac Wolters | Track & Field/Football | 2011 | |
| Doug Wood | Gymnastics | 2010 | |
| Erin Woods | Softball | 2016 | |
| Raf Wyns | Cross Country/Track & Field | 2016 | |
