= Iowa State Cyclones =

Intercollegiate sports teams of Iowa State University

- University: Iowa State University
- Nickname: Cyclones
- NCAA: Division I (FBS)
- Conference: Big 12 Conference
- Athletic director: Jared Benko
- Location: Ames, Iowa
- Varsity teams: 16
- Football stadium: Jack Trice Stadium
- Basketball arena: Hilton Coliseum
- Other venues: Lied Recreation Center
- Colors: Cardinal and gold
- Mascot: Cy the Cardinal
- Fight song: ISU Fights
- Website: cyclones.com

Big 12 logo in Iowa State colors

The Iowa State Cyclones are the intercollegiate athletic teams that represent Iowa State University, located in Ames. The university is a member of the Big 12 Conference and competes in NCAA Division I, fielding 16 varsity teams (6 men's and 10 women's teams) in 12 sports.

The "Cyclones" name dates back to 1895. That year, Iowa suffered an unusually high number of devastating cyclones (as tornadoes were called at the time). In September, the football team from what was then Iowa Agricultural College traveled to Northwestern University and defeated that team by a score of 36–0. The next day, the Chicago Tribune's headline read "Struck by a Cyclone: It Comes from Iowa and Devastates Evanston Town." The article began, "Northwestern might as well have tried to play football with an Iowa cyclone as with the Iowa team it met yesterday." The nickname stuck. As it was difficult to depict a cyclone in media or costume, the university chose a cardinal bird as its mascot, referencing its school colors, and the original school mascot. Iowa State was known as the "Cardinals" when it was changed to the Cyclones. During the years Before the Cardinal mascot was chosen Iowa State had several different mascots, including live animals like a goat, a Great Dane dog etc. In the 1950s a local Ames, IA business, Collegiate Manufacturing, then the leading supplier of college souvenirs—pennants, blankets, and stuffed animals—in the nation, wanted to make toys, souvenirs, and clothing depicting the Iowa State Mascot, and decided it was too difficult to produce Cyclone products and mascot costume, so a contest was held to create an official mascot, in which the Cardinal was chosen. The eight foot bird was introduced at Homecoming, October 16, 1954, but was yet nameless. The "Cy the Cardinal" name was chosen when Mrs. Wilma Ohlsen submitted the name before 16 others, in a nationwide "name-the-bird" contest, held to officially name the mascot.

== Sports sponsored ==
Men's sports	Women's sports
Basketball	Basketball
Cross country	Cross country
Football	Golf
Golf	~~Gymnastics~~
Track and field^{1}	Soccer
Wrestling	Softball
	Swimming and diving
	Tennis
	Track and field^{1}
	Volleyball
	Wrestling (2027–28)
^{1} – includes both indoor and outdoor

=== Men's sports ===
==== Men's basketball ====
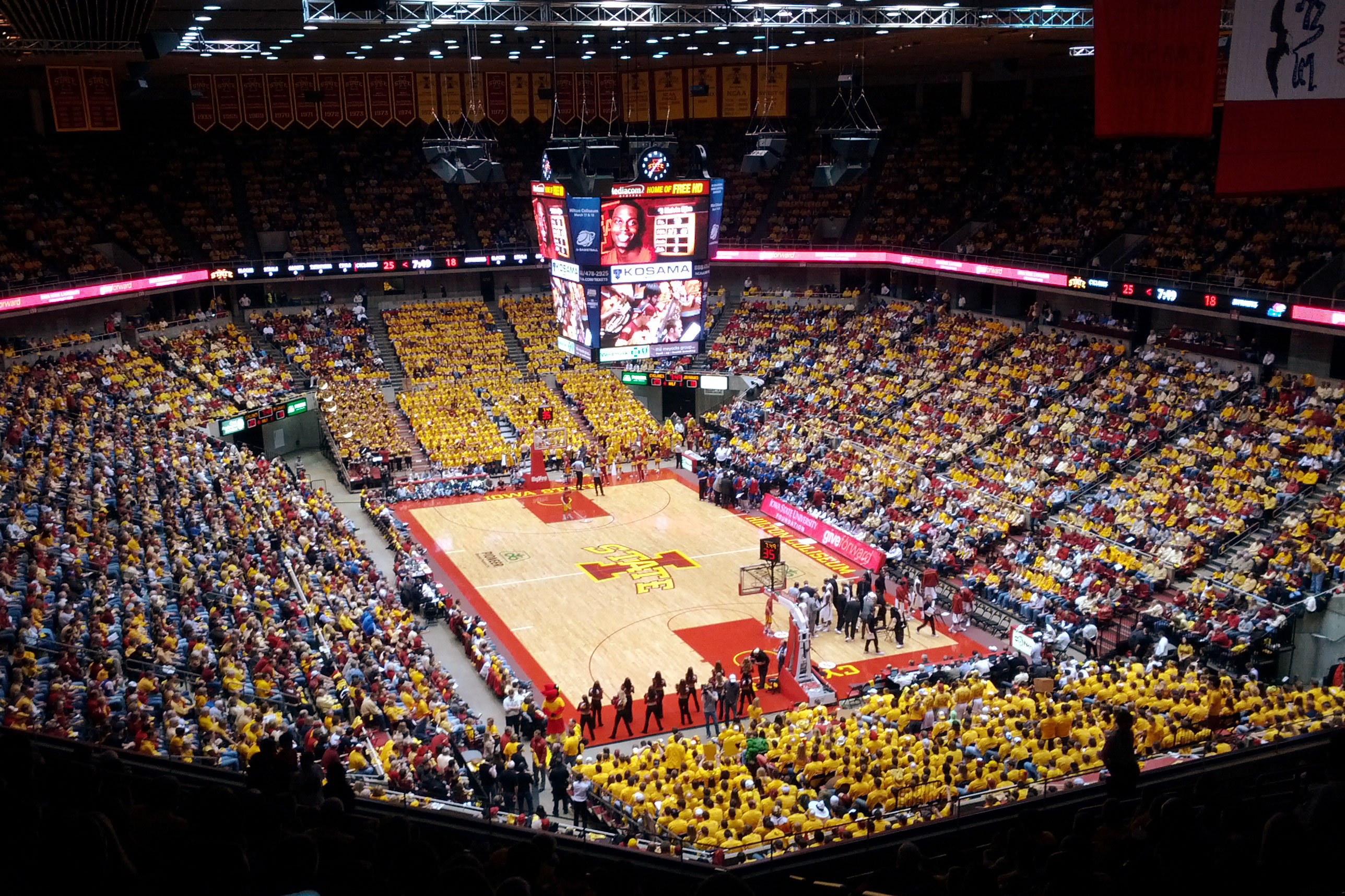
Hilton Coliseum, home to the Iowa State basketball teams

The Iowa State Cyclones men's basketball team competes in the Big 12 Conference of NCAA Division I athletics. T. J. Otzelberger is the current ISU men's basketball head coach. Prior to the 2017–18 season, Iowa State has a 1339–1293 all-time record, and has been to the NCAA Tournament nineteen times including five Sweet 16 appearances, an Elite 8 appearance, and a Final Four appearance. ISU has also won six regular conference titles and six conference tournament titles. Iowa State men's basketball team plays in Hilton Coliseum, part of the Iowa State Center on the south-east side of Iowa State University, and is known as one of the best venues in all of college basketball.

Yearly Records

Season	Overall	Conference
1908	1–1	1–0 (North)
1909	4–10	4–4 (North)
1910	9–7	6–2 (North)
1911	6–11	6–8
1912	8–7	4–4 (North)
1913	3–13	2–4 (North)
1914	4–13	4–10 (North)
1915	6–7	5–5
1916	4–12	2–8
1917	12–6	6–4
1918	6–9	1–6
1919	5–11	3–8
1920	6–12	2–10
1921	10–8	6–8
1922	10–8	8–8
1923	9–9	8–8
1924	2–16	2–14
1925	2–15	1–15
1926	4–14	3–11
1927	9–9	5–7
1928	3–15	3–15
1929	8–7	4–6
1930	9–8	5–5
1931	8–8	4–6
1932	9–6	4–6
1933	6–10	2–8
1934	6–11	2–8
1935	13–3	8–2
1936	8–8	3–7
1937	3–15	0–10
1938	6–9	2–8

Season	Overall	Conference
1939	8–9	5–5
1940	9–9	2–8
1941	15–4	7–3
1942	11–6	5–5
1943	7–9	2–8
1944	14–4	9–1
1945	11–5	8–2
1946	8–8	5–5
1947	7–14	5–5
1948	14–9	6–6
1949	8–14	3–9
1950	6–17	2–10
1951	9–12	3–9
1952	10–11	4–8
1953	10–11	5–7
1954	6–15	2–10
1955	11–10	4–8
1956	18–5	8–4
1957	16–7	6–6
1958	15–8	8–4
1959	9–16	4–10
1960	15–9	7–7
1961	14–11	8–6
1962	13–12	8–6
1963	14–11	8–6
1964	10–16	5–9
1965	9–16	6–8
1966	11–14	6–8
1967	13–12	6–8
1968	12–13	8–6
1969	14–12	8–6

Season	Overall	Conference
1970	12–14	5–9
1971	5–21	2–12
1972	12–14	5–9
1973	16–10	7–7
1974	15–11	6–8
1975	10–16	4–10
1976	3–24	3–11
1977	8–19	3–11
1978	14–13	9–5
1979	11–16	8–6
1980	11–16	5–9
1981	9–18	2–12
1982	10–17	5–9
1983	13–15	5–9
1984	16–13	6–8
1985	21–13	7–7
1986	22–11	9–5
1987	13–15	5–9
1988	20–12	6–8
1989	17–12	7–7
1990	10–18	4–10
1991	12–19	6–8
1992	21–13	5–9
1993	20–11	8–6
1994	14–13	4–10
1995	23–11	6–8
1996	24–9	9–5
1997	22–9	10–6
1998	12–18	5–11
1999	15–15	6–10
2000	32–5	14–2

Season	Overall	Conference
2001	25–6	13–3
2002	12–19	4–12
2003	17–14	5–11
2004	20–13	7–9
2005	19–12	9–7
2006	16–14	6–10
2007	15–16	6–10
2008	14–18	4–12
2009	15–17	4–12
2010	15–17	4–12
2011	16–16	3–13
2012	23–11	12–6
2013	23–12	11–7
2014	28–8	11–7
2015	25–9	12–6
2016	23–12	10–8
2017	24–11	12–6
2018	13–18	4–14
2019	23–12	9–9
2020	12–20	5–13
2021	2–22	0–18
2022	22–13	7–11
2023	19–14	9–9
2024	29–8	13–5
2025	25-10	13-7
2026	20-2	7-2
Total:		1430–1381
National champion Postseason invitational champion Conference regular season champion Conference regular season and conference tournament champion Division regular season champion Division regular season and conference tournament champion Conference tournament champion

==== Cross country ====
The Iowa State men's cross country team competes in the Big 12 Conference of NCAA Division I athletics. Jeremy Sudbury is the current ISU men's cross country head coach.

They have 28 conference titles since they first formed a men's cross country team in 1909. Their 25 Big Eight Conference championships were the most in the conference's 84-year history. They have competed in the NCAA tournament as a team 22 times as well as winning the tournament in 1989 and 1994 and finishing as runner up in 1990, 1991, and 2021.

The cross country team hosts their home meets at the state-of-the-art cross country course south of Iowa State's campus.

==== Football ====
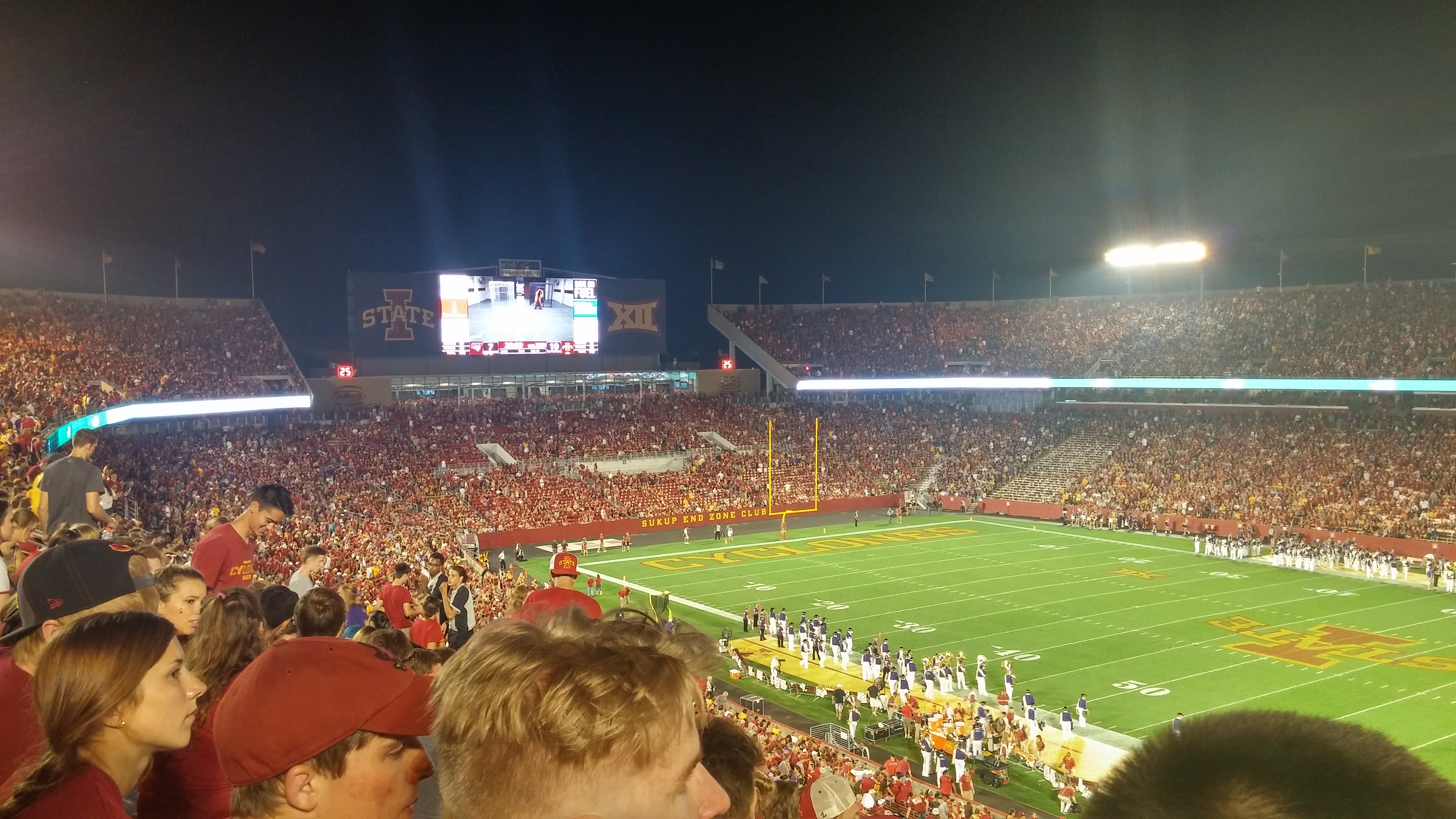
Iowa State football game in Jack Trice Stadium

Iowa State plays NCAA Division I FBS football in the Big 12 Conference. Iowa State football team is led by head coach Matt Campbell. ISU started playing football in 1892, however, it did not become an official sport until 1894. The Cyclones have a 512–624–46 all-time record and are 3–7 in post season play.

The Cyclones play home games in Jack Trice Stadium. The stadium is named after Jack Trice, a football player who incurred a fatal injury while playing for the Cyclones against Minnesota in 1923. In 1975, the stadium's playing field was named in honor of Trice, Iowa State's first African American athlete and the school's first athlete to die of injuries sustained during a Cyclone athletic competition. Until 1997, the facility itself was known as Cyclone Stadium. Because of persistent requests by the students, the facility was renamed Jack Trice Stadium, making it the only Division I FBS stadium named for an African American individual.

Renovations to Jack Trice Stadium were completed before the 2015 football season. Among the upgrades was the Sukup End Zone, an addition to the south end zone of the stadium. This added an additional 3,000 seats, increasing the total stadium capacity to 61,500.

==== Golf ====
The Iowa State men's golf team competes in the Big 12 Conference of NCAA Division I athletics. Andrew Tank is the current ISU men's golf head coach.

They have three conference titles since they first formed a men's golf team in 1935. They have competed in the NCAA tournament as a team 22 times, along with making 18 appearances in the NCAA Championship.

The team practices at the Golf Performance Center that opened in 2013.

==== Track & field ====
The Iowa State men's track & field team competes in the Big 12 Conference of NCAA Division I athletics. Martin Smith is in his 4th year as ISU's Director of Men's and Women's Track and Cross Country.

They have 13 conference titles since they first formed a men's track & field team in 1908. They have made 52 appearances at the indoor and outdoor NCAA championships including nine indoor and 13 outdoor individual national titles.

The track & field team hosts their home meets at the Lied Recreation Center for indoor meets and the Cyclone Sports Complex for outdoor meets.

==== Wrestling ====
The Iowa State men's wrestling team competes in the Big 12 Conference of NCAA Division I athletics. Kevin Dresser is the current ISU wrestling head coach.

They have 17 conference titles since they first formed a wrestling team in 1916. They have won the third most NCAA wrestling champions in NCAA history with eight as well as 66 individual national titles. Iowa State has had 15 wrestlers who have participated in the Olympics resulting in six gold and three bronze medals.

The wrestling team hosts their home meets at Hilton Coliseum. The team practices at Lied Recreation Center.

Yearly Wrestling Records
Season / Record; 1916 / 1–1; 1917 / 2–0; 1918 / 1–1; 1919 / 3–0; 1920 / 5–1; 1921 / 7–1; 1922 / 8–0; 1923 / 8–0; 1924 / 9–0; 1925 / 6–0; 1926 / 8–1; 1927 / 8–1; 1928 / 7–2; 1929 / 7–1; 1930 / 6–3; 1931 / 9–1; 1932 / 6–3; 1933 / 6–1; 1934 / 8–2; 1935 / 4–3	Season / Record; 1936 / 4–2–2; 1937 / 6–2–1; 1938 / 8–0; 1939 / 3–3; 1940 / 4–4; 1941 / 7–3; 1942 / 3–3; 1943 / 1–3; 1944 / NA; 1945 / NA; 1946 / 3–1; 1947 / 4–3; 1948 / 5–5–1; 1949 / 2–6–1; 1950 / 4–6; 1951 / 5–5; 1952 / 6–2; 1953 / 9–1; 1954 / 8–0; 1955 / 7–1	Season / Record; 1956 / 8–3; 1957 / 9–3–1; 1958 / 10–0–2; 1959 / 11–3; 1960 / 12–3; 1961 / 13–1–2; 1962 / 12–1–1; 1963 / 13–1; 1964 / 13–0–1; 1965 / 14–1; 1966 / 13–2; 1967 / 12–3–1; 1968 / 12–3; 1969 / 15–1; 1970 / 15–2; 1971 / 17–0; 1972 / 16–1; 1973 / 18–1; 1974 / 13–5; 1975 / 16–2–2	Season / Record; 1976 / 19–2; 1977 / 18–2–1; 1978 / 19–2; 1979 / 18–3; 1980 / 18–4; 1981 / 19–2; 1982 / 17–2; 1983 / 14–4; 1984 / 13–7; 1985 / 20–7; 1986 / 19–1; 1987 / 14–3; 1988 / 17–4; 1989 / 8–9–1; 1990 / 14–9; 1991 / 13–3; 1992 / 13–3; 1993 / 13–4; 1994 / 7–7; 1995 / 17–4	Season / Record; 1996 / 12–6–1; 1997 / 10–7–1; 1998 / 12–8; 1999 / 20–5–1; 2000 / 20–2; 2001 / 19–4; 2002 / 17–5; 2003 / 8–10; 2004 / 16–4; 2005 / 16–2; 2006 / 11–7; 2007 / 13–3; 2008 / 16–4; 2009 / 15–3; 2010 / 13–2; 2011 / 9–10; 2012 / 4–14; 2013 / 11–5; 2014 / 9–7; 2015 / 11–2; 2016 / 10–6
Total:		1,051–308–20		
National champion Postseason invitational champion Conference regular season champion Conference regular season and conference tournament champion Division regular season champion Division regular season and conference tournament champion Conference tournament champion

=== Women's sports ===
==== Women's Basketball ====
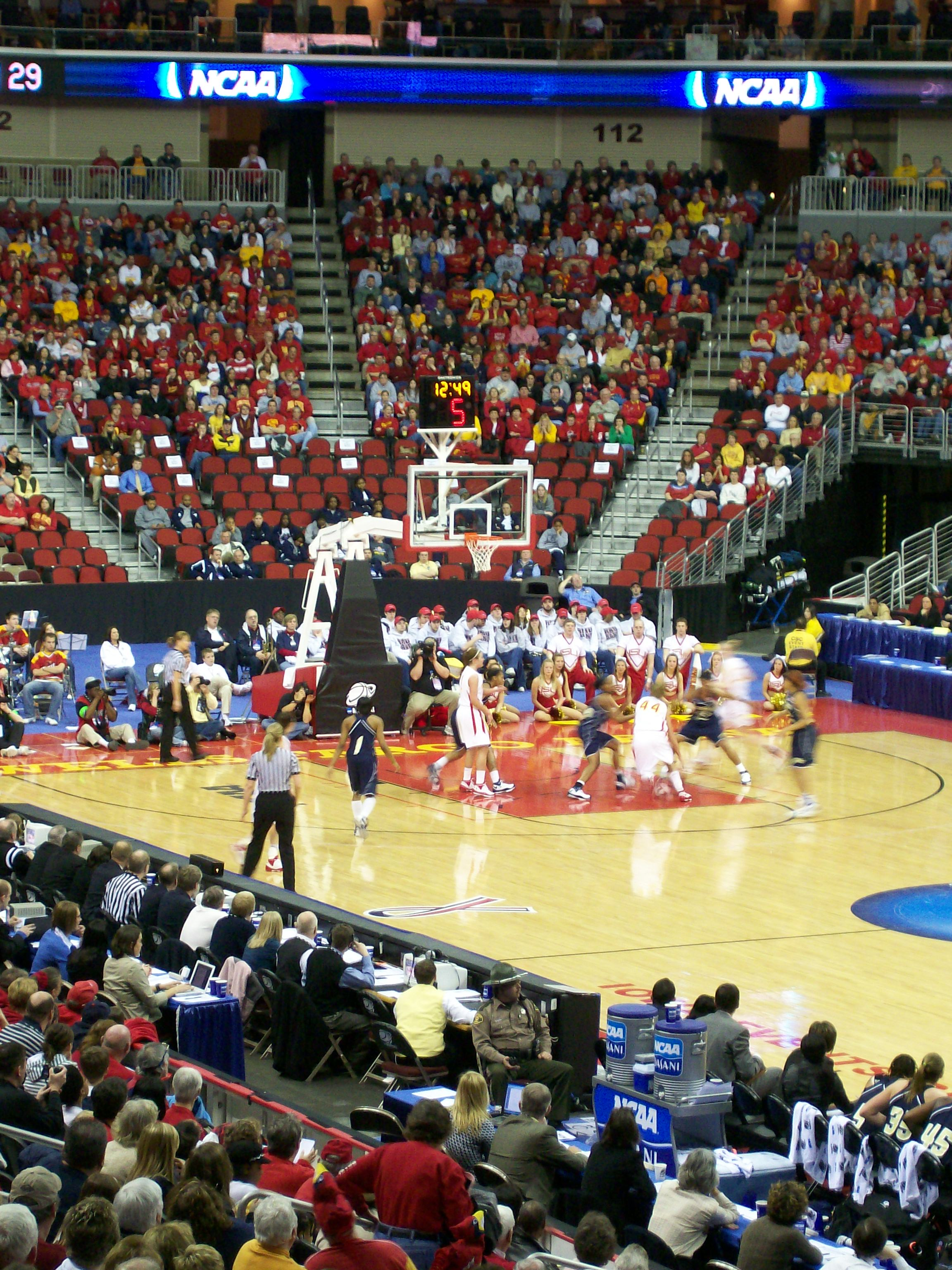
ISU women's basketball game against Georgia Tech in 2008

The Iowa State women's basketball team competes in the Big 12 Conference of NCAA Division I athletics. Bill Fennelly is in his 22nd season as ISU's head women's basketball coach. Coach Fennelly's record is 465–236 and ISU's all-time record is 677–562.

They have earned one regular season conference title and two conference tournament titles since they first formed a women's basketball team in 1973. They have competed in the NCAA tournament 17 times including five trips to the Sweet Sixteen and two trips to the Elite Eight.

The women's basketball team plays its home games in Hilton Coliseum. The team practices at the Sukup Basketball Complex. Attendance at ISU women's games have ranked in the top ten for eighteen consecutive years.

Yearly Records

Record table
Season	Coach	Overall	Conference	Standing	Postseason
Iowa State (no conference games) (1973–1976)
Gloria Crosby (1973–1974)
1973–1974	Gloria Crosby	8–8			
Gloria Crosby:		8–8			
Lynn Wheeler (1974–1980)
1974–1975	Lynn Wheeler	12–9			
1975–1976	Lynn Wheeler	20–8			
Iowa State (Big 8 Conference – round-robin tournament only) (1976–1982)
1976–1977	Lynn Wheeler	19–11	1–2	6th	
1977–1978	Lynn Wheeler	13–15	1–2	6th	
1978–1979	Lynn Wheeler	10–19	1–2	7th	
1979–1980	Lynn Wheeler	6–19	0–3	8th	
Lynn Wheeler:		80–81			
Debbie Oing (1980–1984)
1980–1981	Debbie Oing	7–18	1–2	6th	
1981–1982	Debbie Oing	11–20	1–2	4th	
Iowa State (Big 8 Conference) (1982–1996)
1982–1983	Debbie Oing	9–18	3–9	7th	
1983–1984	Debbie Oing	4–24	0–14	8th	
Debbie Oing:		31–80	3–23 (2 seasons)		
Pam Wettig (1984–1992)
1984–1985	Pam Wettig	12–16	3–11	7th	
1985–1986	Pam Wettig	19–9	8–6	4th(t)	
1986–1987	Pam Wettig	12–16	2–12	8th	
1987–1988	Pam Wettig	13–14	5–9	7th	
1988–1989	Pam Wettig	15–13	6–8	5th	
1989–1990	Pam Wettig	14–15	3–11	6th	
1990–1991	Pam Wettig	11–15	6–7	5th	
1991–1992	Pam Wettig	4–23	2–12	7th (t)	
Pam Wettig:		100–121	35–76		
Theresa Becker (Big 8 Conference) (1992–1995)
1992–1993	Theresa Becker	2–25	1–13	7th (t)	
1993–1994	Theresa Becker	8–19	3–11	7th (t)	
1994–1995	Theresa Becker	8–19	1–13	8th	
Theresa Becker:		18–63	5–37		
Bill Fennelly (Big 8 Conference) (1995–present)
1995–1996	Bill Fennelly	17–10	5–9	6th	
Iowa State (Big 12 Conference) (1996–present)
1996–1997	Bill Fennelly	17–12	9–7	5th (t)	NCAA 1st Round
1997–1998	Bill Fennelly	25–8	12–4	2nd	NCAA 2nd Round
1998–1999	Bill Fennelly	25–8	12–4	2nd	NCAA Elite Eight
1999–2000	Bill Fennelly	27–6	13–3	1st (t)	NCAA Sweet 16
2000–2001	Bill Fennelly	27–6	12–4	3rd	NCAA Sweet 16
2001–2002	Bill Fennelly	24–9	9–7	6th	NCAA 2nd Round
2002–2003	Bill Fennelly	12–16	7–9	8th	
2003–2004	Bill Fennelly	18–15	7–9	7th (t)	NIT Semifinal
2004–2005	Bill Fennelly	23–7	12–4	3rd (t)	NCAA 1st Round
2005–2006	Bill Fennelly	18–13	7–9	8th (t)	NIT 2nd Round
2006–2007	Bill Fennelly	26–9	10–6	4th (t)	NCAA 2nd Round
2007–2008	Bill Fennelly	21–13	7–9	7th (t)	NCAA 2nd Round
2008–2009	Bill Fennelly	27–9	11–5	3rd (t)	NCAA Elite Eight
2009–2010	Bill Fennelly	25–8	11–5	2nd (t)	NCAA Sweet Sixteen
2010–2011	Bill Fennelly	22–11	9–7	5th	NCAA 1st Round
2011–2012	Bill Fennelly	18–13	9–9	4th (t)	NCAA 1st Round
2012–2013	Bill Fennelly	24–9	12–6	2nd	NCAA 2nd Round
2013–2014	Bill Fennelly	20–11	9–1	5th	NCAA 1st Round
2014–2015	Bill Fennelly	18–13	9–9	5th	NCAA 1st Round
Bill Fennelly:		440–209	192–134		
Total:		677–562			
National champion Postseason invitational champion Conference regular season champion Conference regular season and conference tournament champion Division regular season champion Division regular season and conference tournament champion Conference tournament champion

==== Cross country ====
The Iowa State women's cross country team competes in the Big 12 Conference of NCAA Division I athletics. Andrea Grove-McDonough is in her 4th ISU's head women's cross country coach.

They have 12 conference team titles and nine individual titles since they first formed a men's cross country team in 1973. Their 8 Big Eight Conference championships were the most in the conference's 20-year history. They have five AIAW national championships as well as finishing the NCAA championship twice as runner-up. They have had one NCAA individual championship, Betsy Saina, who also holds the NCAA 6,000 meter record.

The cross country team hosts their home meets at the state-of-the-art cross country course south of Iowa State's campus.

==== Golf ====
The Iowa State women's golf team competes in the Big 12 Conference of NCAA Division I athletics. Christie Martens is in her 17th season as ISU's head women's golf coach.

They have earned one conference championship as a team and one individual conference championship since they first formed a women's golf team in 1972. They have competed in the NCAA regional tournament 14 times as well as the NCAA Championship four times.

The team practices at the Golf Performance Center that opened in 2013.

==== Soccer ====
The Iowa State women's soccer team competes in the Big 12 Conference of NCAA Division I athletics. Tony Minatta is in his 5th season as ISU's head women's soccer coach. ISU's all-time record is 159–200–30.

They have yet to earn a conference title but have appeared in the conference championship nine times since they first formed a women's soccer team in 1995. They have made one appearance in the NCAA tournament.

The soccer team plays their home games at the Cyclone Sports Complex that opened in 2012.

==== Softball ====
The Iowa State softball team competes in the Big 12 Conference of NCAA Division I athletics. Jamie Pinkerton is in his 1st season as ISU's head softball coach. ISU's all-time record is 921-1032-6.

They have earned two conference championships since they first formed a softball team in 1974. The team has finished as runner-up in two Women's College World Series, in 1971 and 1973. In addition to their collegiate honors the Cyclones have produced two Olympians in Erin Woods and Kristen Karanzias.

The softball team plays their home games at the Cyclone Sports Complex that opened in 2012. The team practices at the Bergstrom Indoor Practice Facility.

==== Swimming & diving ====
The Iowa State swimming & diving team competes in the Big 12 Conference of NCAA Division I athletics. Duane Sorenson is in his 19th season as ISU's head women's swimming & and diving coach. Coach Sorenson's record is 103–84–1 and ISU's all-time record is 202–179–1.

They have earned one conference title as a team and 40 individual conference championships since they first formed a women's swimming & diving team in 1970. They have had 30 AIAW qualifiers and 44 NCAA qualifiers.

The swimming & diving team hosts their home meets at Beyer Pool on Iowa State's campus.

==== Tennis ====
The Iowa State women's tennis team competes in the Big 12 Conference of NCAA Division I athletics. Armando Espinosa is in his 9th season as ISU's head women's tennis coach.

The women's tennis team utilize the Forker Tennis Courts for outdoor meets and practice when weather allows. The team hosts indoor meets and practice at the Bruce McKee Indoor Tennis Complex.

==== Track & field ====
The Iowa State women's track & field team competes in the Big 12 Conference of NCAA Division I athletics. Martin Smith is in his 4th year as ISU's Director of Men's and Women's Track and Cross Country.

They have nine conference titles since they first formed a women's track & field team in 1974. They have made 24 appearances at the indoor and outdoor NCAA championships including eight indoor and 14 outdoor individual national titles.

The track & field team hosts their home meets at the Lied Recreation Center for indoor meets and the Cyclone Sports Complex for outdoor meets.

==== Volleyball ====
The Iowa State women's volleyball team competes in the Big 12 Conference of NCAA Division I athletics. Christy Johnson-Lynch is in her 12th season as ISU's head women's volleyball coach. Coach Johnson-Lynch has a record of 246–123 and ISU's all-time record is 787–719–10.

They have competed in the NCAA tournament 12 times since they first formed a women's volleyball team in 1973, including three appearances in the Sweet 16 and two in the Elite 8.

The volleyball team hosts their home matches at Hilton Coliseum on Iowa State's campus.

Yearly Records

Record table
Season	Coach	Overall	Conference	Standing	Postseason
Iowa State (no conference games) (1973–1981)
1973	Gloria Crosby	22–8			
1974	Gloria Crosby	23–9			
Gloria Crosby:		45–17			
1975	Kay Pundt	49–31			
Kay Pundt:		49–31			
Iowa State Big 8 Conference – round-robin tournament only () (1976–1981)
1976	Diane Hale	15–13–1		6th	
1977	Diane Hale	18–30–1		T-4th	
Diane Hale:		33–43–2			
1978	Sharon Hitsman	19–29–3		T-6th	
1979	Sharon Hitsman	27–29–3		T-4th	
1980	Sharon Hitsman	39–22–1		T-5th	
Sharon Hitsman:		85–80–7			
1981	Mary Fischl	24–22–1		T-5th	
Iowa State (Big 8 Conference) () (1982–1996)
1982	Mary Fischl	17–18	5–5	3rd	
1983	Mary Fischl	18–13	5–5	4th	
1984	Mary Fischl	21–9	6–4	3rd	
Mary Fischl:		80–62–1	16–14		
1985	Vicki Mealer	15–15	1–9	6th	
1986	Vicki Mealer	13–15	4–6	4th	
1987	Vicki Mealer	20–11	8–4	3rd	
1988	Vicki Mealer	12–17	4–8	4th	
1989	Vicki Mealer	17–17	6–6	4th	
1990	Vicki Mealer	22–12	8–4	3rd	
1991	Vicki Mealer	15–12	6–6	T-3rd	
1992	Vicki Mealer	21–11	7–5	3rd	
Vicki Mealer:		135–110	44–48		
1993	Jackie Nunez	9–19	5–7	T-4th	
1994	Jackie Nunez	24–11	8–4	3rd	
1995	Jackie Nunez	22–12	8–4	T-2nd	
Iowa State Big 12 Conference () (1976–1981)
1996	Jackie Nunez	7–25	3–17	10th	
1997	Jackie Nunez	10–23	1–19	11th	
Jackie Nunez:		72–90	25–51		
1998	Kerry Miller	3–29	1–19	11th	
Kerry Miller:		3–29	1–19		
1999	Linda Crum	3–24	1–19	11th	
2000	Linda Crum	1–27	0–20	11th	
2001	Linda Crum	4–22	1–19	11th	
2002	Linda Crum	10–22	1–19	11th	
2003	Linda Crum	12–19	4–16	8th	
2004	Linda Crum	8–21	1–19	11th	
Linda Crum:		39–135	8–112		
2005	Christy Johnson-Lynch	16–15	9–11	T-6th	1st Round
2006	Christy Johnson-Lynch	21–11	12–8	T-4th	2nd Round
2007	Christy Johnson-Lynch	19–14	11–9	5th	Sweet 16
2008	Christy Johnson-Lynch	22–13	11–9	T-4th	Elite 8
2009	Christy Johnson-Lynch	27–5	17–3	2nd	Sweet 16
2010	Christy Johnson-Lynch	20–9	13–7	3rd	1st Round
2011	Christy Johnson-Lynch	25–6	13–3	2nd	Elite 8
2012	Christy Johnson-Lynch	22–8	13–3	2nd	Sweet 16
2013	Christy Johnson-Lynch	18–10	11–5	T-3rd	1st Round
2014	Christy Johnson-Lynch	19–10	10–6	2nd	2nd Round
2015	Christy Johnson-Lynch	19–11	11–5	3rd	2nd Round
2016	Christy Johnson-Lynch	18–11	9–7	3rd	1st Round
Christy Johnson-Lynch:		246–123	140–69		
Total:		787–719–10			
National champion Postseason invitational champion Conference regular season champion Conference regular season and conference tournament champion Division regular season champion Division regular season and conference tournament champion Conference tournament champion

==== Wrestling ====
On April 16, 2026, Iowa State announced it would add women's wrestling in the 2027–28 school year. At the time of announcement, only six of the 112 then-current NCAA programs in that sport were sponsored by Division I members, with one of those six being in-state rival Iowa (with two other D-I members, Mercyhurst and Kent State, having announced they would also launch women's wrestling, respectively in 2026–27 and 2027–28). At the same time, 14 other Iowa schools, both in lower NCAA divisions and the NAIA, sponsored varsity women's wrestling.

== Former varsity sports ==
=== Baseball ===
Iowa State fielded baseball as an official sports team from 1892 until the conclusion of the 2000–2001 season. Iowa State discontinued baseball due to budget constraints, but it remains as a club sport. Iowa State had a 1,346–1,412–17 all-time record including a 7–6 NCAA tournament record and two appearances in the College World Series. Following the discontinuation of baseball, Iowa State is one of only two Big 12 schools (Colorado) and one of only four Power Four schools that do not sponsor the sport, the other two being Syracuse and Wisconsin.

=== Gymnastics ===
The Iowa State women's gymnastics team competed in the Big 12 Conference of NCAA Division I athletics. Jay Ronayne was in his 10th season as ISU's head women's gymnastics coach. Coach Ronayne's record was 68–120–5 and ISU's all-time record is 518–594–7.

They had four conference championships as well as 30 individual conference championships since they first formed a women's gymnastics team in 1977. They have competed in the NCAA tournament as a team eight times including one appearance in the Super Six in 2006 in addition to having 14 individual qualifiers.

The gymnastics team hosted their home meets at Hilton Coliseum. The team practiced at the Amy and Dennis Pyle Family Gymnastics Facility. It was announced in March 2026 that the sport was discontinued.

=== Other sports ===
Iowa State has dropped the following sports:

- Men's tennis (1994)
- Men's gymnastics (1994)
- Men's swimming (2001)

Iowa State dropped men's tennis and men's gymnastics in 1994 and added women's soccer in 1995, ahead of a 1998 deadline for compliance with Title IX; these changes resulted in 6 men's sports and 10 women's sports.

== Championships ==
=== National team championships ===
National Championships (21)
Men's (13)
Sport	Year	Head Coach	Tournament
Men's cross country	1989	Bill Bergan	NCAA
Men's cross country	1994	Bill Bergan	NCAA
Men's gymnastics	1971	Ed Gagnier	NCAA
Men's gymnastics	1973	Ed Gagnier	NCAA
Men's gymnastics	1974	Ed Gagnier	NCAA
Wrestling	1933	Hugo Otopalik	NCAA
Wrestling	1965	Harold Nichols	NCAA
Wrestling	1969	Harold Nichols	NCAA
Wrestling	1970	Harold Nichols	NCAA
Wrestling	1972	Harold Nichols	NCAA
Wrestling	1973	Harold Nichols	NCAA
Wrestling	1977	Harold Nichols	NCAA
Wrestling	1987	Jim Gibbons	NCAA
Women's (8)
Cross country	1975	Bill Bergan	AIAW
Cross country	1976	Bill Bergan	AIAW
Cross country	1977	Bill Bergan	AIAW
Cross country	1978	Bill Bergan	AIAW
Cross country	1981	Bill Bergan	AIAW
Dance Team	2016	Jill Petersen	NDA
Dance Team	2017	Jill Petersen	NDA
Indoor Track & Field	1979		AIAW

=== Conference championships ===
Titles	Sport	Year
20	Men's Swimming	MVC: 1929, 1931, 1932; Big 6: 1933, 1934, 1936, 1938, 1939, 1940, 1941, 1942, 1947; Big 7: 1948, 1949, 1951, 1954; Big 8: 1967, 1976, 1977, 1995
14	Wrestling	Big 6: 1933, 1937, 1941, 1947; Big 7: 1958; Big 8: 1970, 1976, 1977, 1980, 1982, 1987; Big 12: 2007, 2008, 2009
15	Men's Outdoor Track & Field	Big 10: 1911, 1919, 1920; Big 6: 1944, 1945; Big 8: 1981, 1983, 1984, 1985, 1986, 1988, 1991, 1992, 1993, 1994
10	Men's Gymnastics	Big 8: 1965, 1966, 1967, 1969, 1970, 1971, 1972, 1973, 1974, 1975
12	Women's Cross Country	Big 8: 1975, 1976, 1977, 1978, 1979, 1981, 1983, 1990; Big 12: 2011, 2012, 2013, 2014, 2016, 2017
9	Men's Basketball	Big 6: 1935, 1941, 1944, 1945; Big 7: 1955; Big 8: 1959, 1996; Big 12: 2000(2), 2001
8	Men's Indoor Track & Field	Big 6: 1944, 1945, 1946; Big 8: 1984, 1986, 1990, 1991, 1993
6	Women's Outdoor Track & Field	Big 8: 1974, 1975, 1976, 1977, 1978, 1979
5	Women's Indoor Track & Field	Big 8: 1974, 1975, 1976, 1978, 1979
4	Baseball	Big 6: 1936; Big 7: 1957; Big 8: 1970, 1971
4	Women's Gymnastics	Big 8: 1975, 1977; Big 12: 2000, 2006
2	Football	MVC: 1911, 1912
3	Men's Golf	Big 6: 1940, 1947, 1953
3	Women's Basketball	Big 12: 2000(2), 2001
2	Men's Cross Country	Big 8: 1989, 1994, Big 12: 2017
1	Women's Golf	Big 8: 1993
1	Women's Swimming & Diving	Big 8: 1974

== Club sports ==
ISU has a variety of club sports for both men and women. Some clubs just compete on the intramural level on ISU's campus while other compete for championships on the national level.

=== Soccer ===
The Iowa State men's soccer club competes in Region 5 of NIRSA and has competed in the Championship Division of the NIRSA National Soccer Tournament 2 of the last 4 years. The Cyclones regularly schedule games with colleges throughout Iowa and surrounding states. While the club has a history of producing highly successful goalkeepers, undoubtedly their biggest strength has been their defensive unit. The club would compete with in-state rivals, the Iowa Hawkeyes, but their club has a history of not accepting game invites.

=== Baseball ===
ISU baseball was cut by the school's athletic department in 2000; but it continues, as a club sport, to provide students with the opportunity to attend ISU and play competitive baseball. The team is a member of the National Club Baseball Association and competes in the North Division of the Mid-America Conference.

They play their home games at Cap Timm Field on Iowa State's campus.

=== Crew ===
Iowa State has both of men's and women's club crew team. They have competed since first forming in 2002.

=== Equestrian ===
Iowa State has an equestrian club team that competes in the Intercollegiate Horse Show Association with two different teams, Hunt (English) and Stock (western).

They are coached by Rebecca Ness.

=== Golf ===
The Iowa State Golf Club first formed in 2009 and has competed in the National Collegiate Golf Club Association since 2013. They have reached the NCCGA National Championship three times since joining the association (Spring 2015, Fall 2015, and Spring 2016), and the NCCGA National Invitational Tournament once (Spring 2018).

The club hosts home meets and practice at Veenker Memorial Golf Course on Iowa State's campus.

=== Running ===
Iowa State competes at the club level as part of NIRCA (National Intercollegiate Running Club Association). It joined in 2009 as part of the Great Plains region alongside schools like the University of Illinois, University of Wisconsin, University of Minnesota, University of Missouri, Northwestern University, among others.

It first competed in the XC (Cross Country) National Championships in Ypsilanti Michigan at Eagle Crest Golf Course with the Men's team placing 14th overall.

In the XC events Men run an 8K while Women run a 6K.

=== Ice Hockey ===
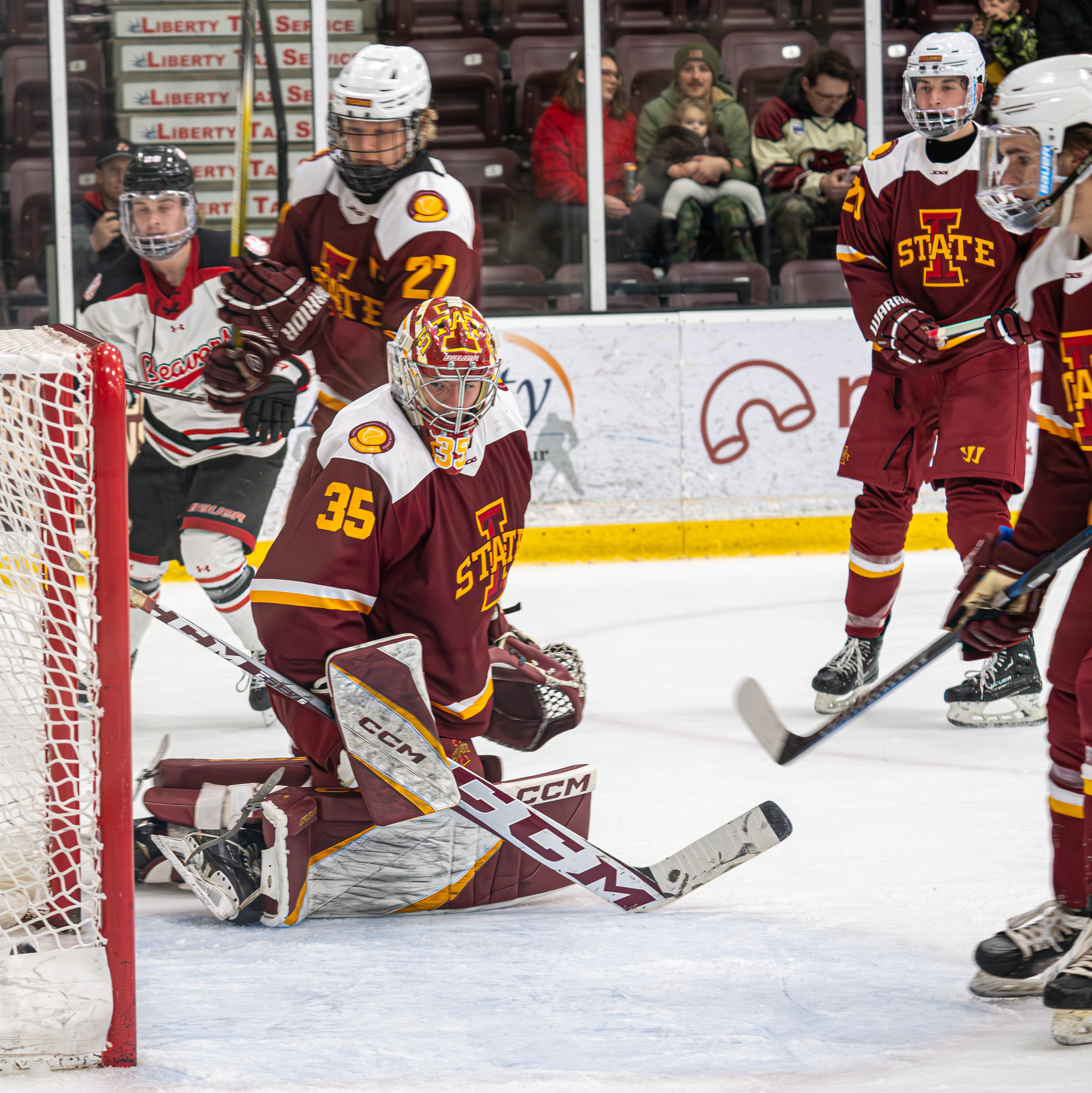
The Cyclones club hockey team plays a game against Minot State in 2025

Iowa State Men's Hockey is technically a club sport but operates like a non-scholarship sport. ISU played in the Division I Central States Collegiate Hockey League conference from 1979 until the conference folded in 2024, at which point the team moved to Midwest College Hockey, both of which are part of the American Collegiate Hockey Association. They have been runner-up five times and won one ACHA national championship in 1992.

The Iowa State women's hockey team competes in Division II of the ACHA and won the national championship in 2014.

Both teams host their home meets and practice at Ames/ISU Ice Arena.

=== Lacrosse ===
Iowa State's club lacrosse team competes in Division I of the Upper Midwest Lacrosse League.

They host their home games and practice at Lied Recreation Facility on Iowa State's campus.

=== Martial Arts ===
Iowa State has had various martial arts clubs since 1963. When Master Yong Chin Pak joined the Iowa State faculty in 1973 the clubs took a massive step forward. They existed separately until 2011 when they were all combined to form the Cyclone Martial Arts Club.

=== Rodeo ===
ISU Rodeo is a member of the National Intercollegiate Rodeo Association (NIRA) and hosts the Cyclone Stampede Rodeo which is one of the oldest collegiate rodeo athletic events in the US.

=== Rugby ===
The Iowa State Rugby Club plays college rugby in Division IAA in the Heart of America conference against many of Iowa State's traditional athletic rivals such as Iowa, Missouri, and Kansas State.

The team is coached by Anthony “Ant” Frein, who led them to their first appearance in the Collegiate Rugby Championship in 2021.

== Rivalries/Trophy games ==
=== Cy-Hawk Series ===
Iowa Corn Cy-Hawk Trophy

Started in 2004, the annual Hy-Vee Cy-Hawk Series gives points to the Hawkeyes and Cyclones based on wins in 11 sports and academic achievement. Each team is awarded 2 points for a win (except football which gets 3 points), 1 point for a tie, and 2 points for having athletes average GPA better than national average. At the end of the year the team with the most points wins the series for that year. The series is currently tied with 7 wins for each school.

- Men's golf
- Volleyball
- Women's soccer
- Football
- Men's cross country
- Women's cross country
- Wrestling
- Men's basketball
- Women's basketball
- Women's swimming & diving
- Women's gymnastics
- Softball

The football specific Cy-Hawk Trophy was introduced in 1977 when the two teams met for the first time since 1934. The trophy is awarded to the victor of the annual football game. The trophy features a football player, with the Cyclone's and Hawkeye's logos.

=== Farmageddon ===
Iowa State and Kansas State first met in football in 1917, when both schools were members of the Big Eight Conference. The match-up continued as an annual conference game through the schools' shift into the Big 12 Conference. It gained the nickname "Farmageddon" in 2009, when the game was played at the neutral site of Arrowhead Stadium in Kansas City, Missouri. Two years prior, the Missouri–Kansas game had been held at that stadium and dubbed "Armageddon at Arrowhead"; with both Iowa State and K-State being land-grant institutions renowned for having strong agricultural programs, the title was seen as an easy fit and gained popularity with fans and the media even after the Arrowhead series concluded.

The series has been dominated by long winning streaks for both teams, with each team's longest winning streak at 10 games. Kansas State is 22–4 since 1989. Iowa State leads the series 50–48–4 all-time.

=== Telephone Trophy (dormant) ===
Missouri and Iowa State first met in football in 1896 and the regional rivalry was born. Before the 1959 match-up between the two schools, which took place in Ames, Iowa, field testing showed that the telephones the two schools used to communicate with their coaches in the coaches box were wired so that either school could hear what was happening on the other sideline. The problem was fixed before the game, but neither of the two coaches knew that. Northwestern Bell Telephone Company of Ames then decided to have a trophy made to commemorate the incident, and thus the Telephone Trophy was born. Missouri leads the rivalry 61–34–9 all-time. When Missouri left the Big 12 for the SEC the rivalry was essentially ended.

== Traditions ==
=== Hall of Fame ===
The Iowa State Cyclones Hall of Fame is a hall of fame that recognizes former student-athletes that achieved great success during their time at Iowa State University over the past 120 years.

The Hall was first created in 1997. Since the program's inception in 1997, there have been 154 individuals inducted.

=== Mascot ===
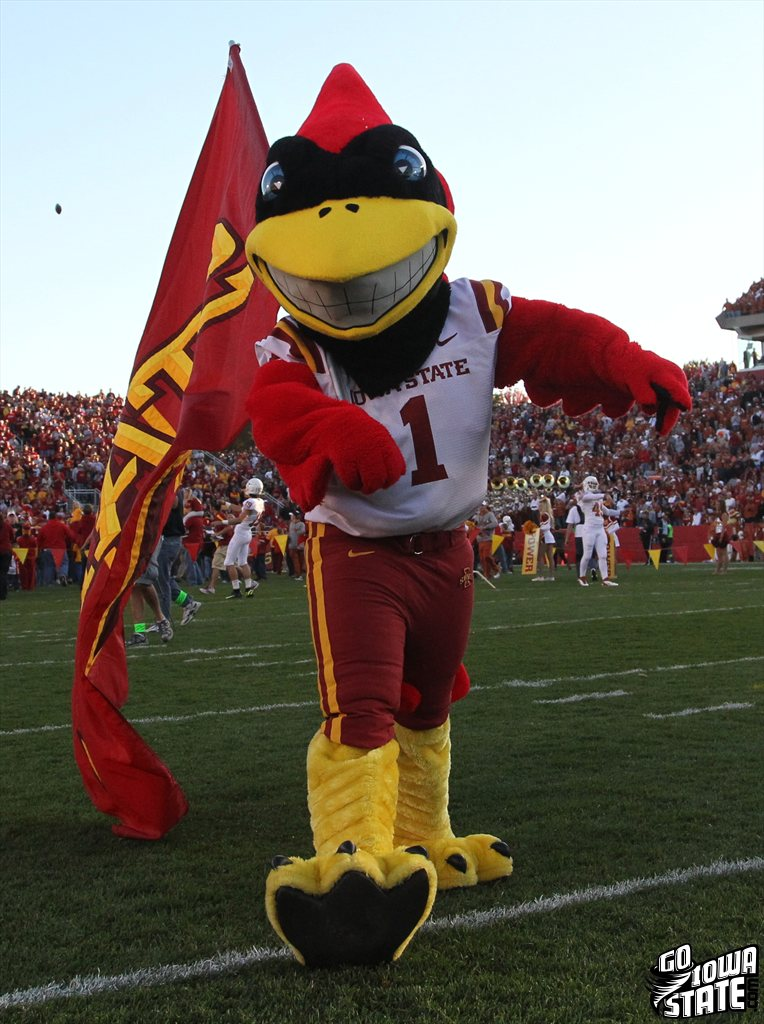
Cy during a football game

Iowa State uses a cardinal, Cy, as its mascot instead of an actual tornado or Cyclone. Prior to the football match up against the University of Colorado on November 12, 2005, a tornado touched down in Ames, Iowa and forced fans to either stand out in the parking lot and watch the storm or flee to shelter in Hilton Coliseum. It created such an atmosphere that Iowa State was able to win over the favored Buffaloes 30–16. When asked about the event, Colorado coach Gary Barnett said, "I thought we had a pretty good mascot. But when we showed up at Iowa State and they had a real tornado, that's the real deal."

=== Colors ===
Originally silver, yellow, and black, the school colors were changed to cardinal and gold in 1899 to make dyeing sweaters easier. A council was formed in October 1899 with the purpose of finding new colors that would be suitable for sweaters. The council reported in favor of cardinal sweaters with gold lettering. According to cyclones.com (Iowa State Athletics official website), the Iowa State teams were originally known as the "Cardinals", though there is no other evidence to support it, it is assumed that the cardinal color was derived from the original team name.

Cardinal
Gold

=== Cheers ===
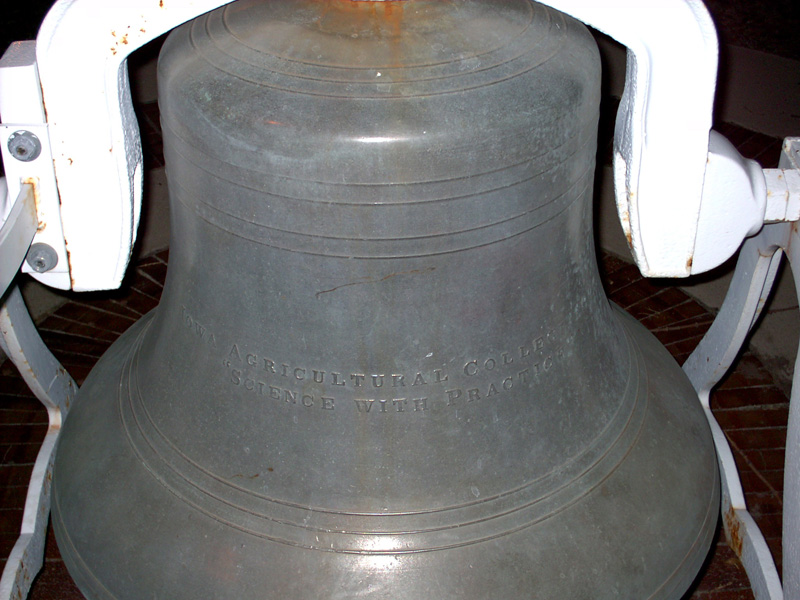
ISU's victory bell

ISU Fights is the official fight song for Iowa State University:

O we will fight, fight, fight for Iowa State,
And may her colors ever fly.
Yes, we will fight with might for Iowa State,
With a will to do or die,
Rah! Rah! Rah!
Loyal sons forever true,
And we will fight the battle through.
And when we hit that line we'll hit it hard every yard for I. S. U!

== Facilities ==
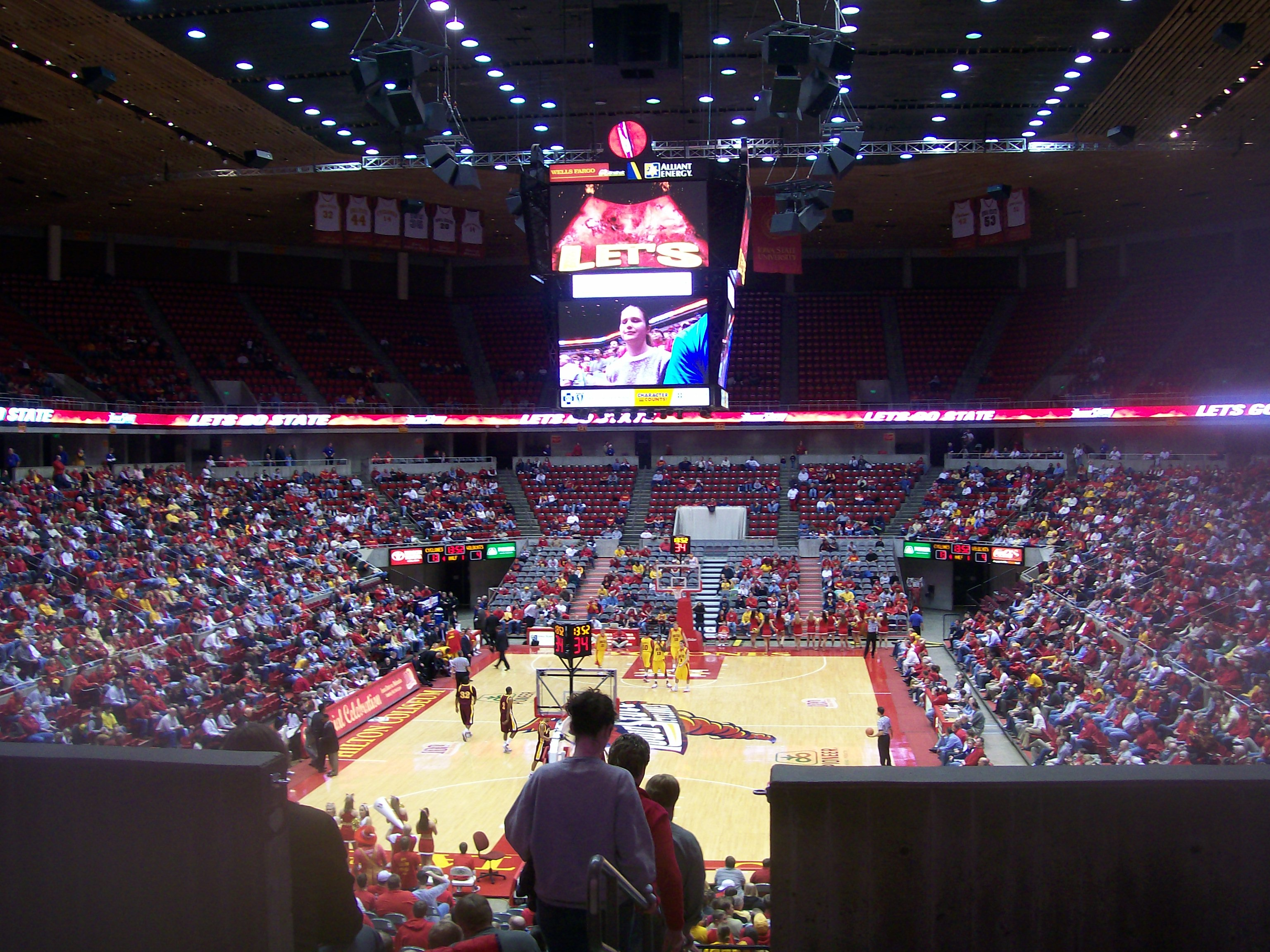
Hilton Coliseum

Hilton Coliseum

James H. Hilton Coliseum is a 14,384-seat multi-purpose arena. The arena, which is part of the Iowa State Center, opened in 1971. It is home to the Iowa State men's basketball, women's basketball, wrestling, gymnastics, and volleyball teams. The building was specifically built to hold in sound with a solid concrete structure, steel doors, and a crowd that sits just a few feet from the court. During big games, players from opposing teams, as well as Iowa State, have even said that the floor has shaken due to the loudness of the crowd.

Sukup Basketball Complex

Opened in September 2009, Iowa State's new basketball practice facility is located on 2 acres (8,100 m^{2}) of land (in west Ames, Iowa) that was donated by a local developer, Dickson Jensen. The $8 million, 36,000-square-foot (3,300 m^{2}) facility, includes two separate 10,000 square- foot gymnasiums for both men's and women's basketball programs, as well as separate lounges and locker rooms, a theater room, a medical treatment area, and coaches' offices and conference rooms.

Jack Trice Stadium

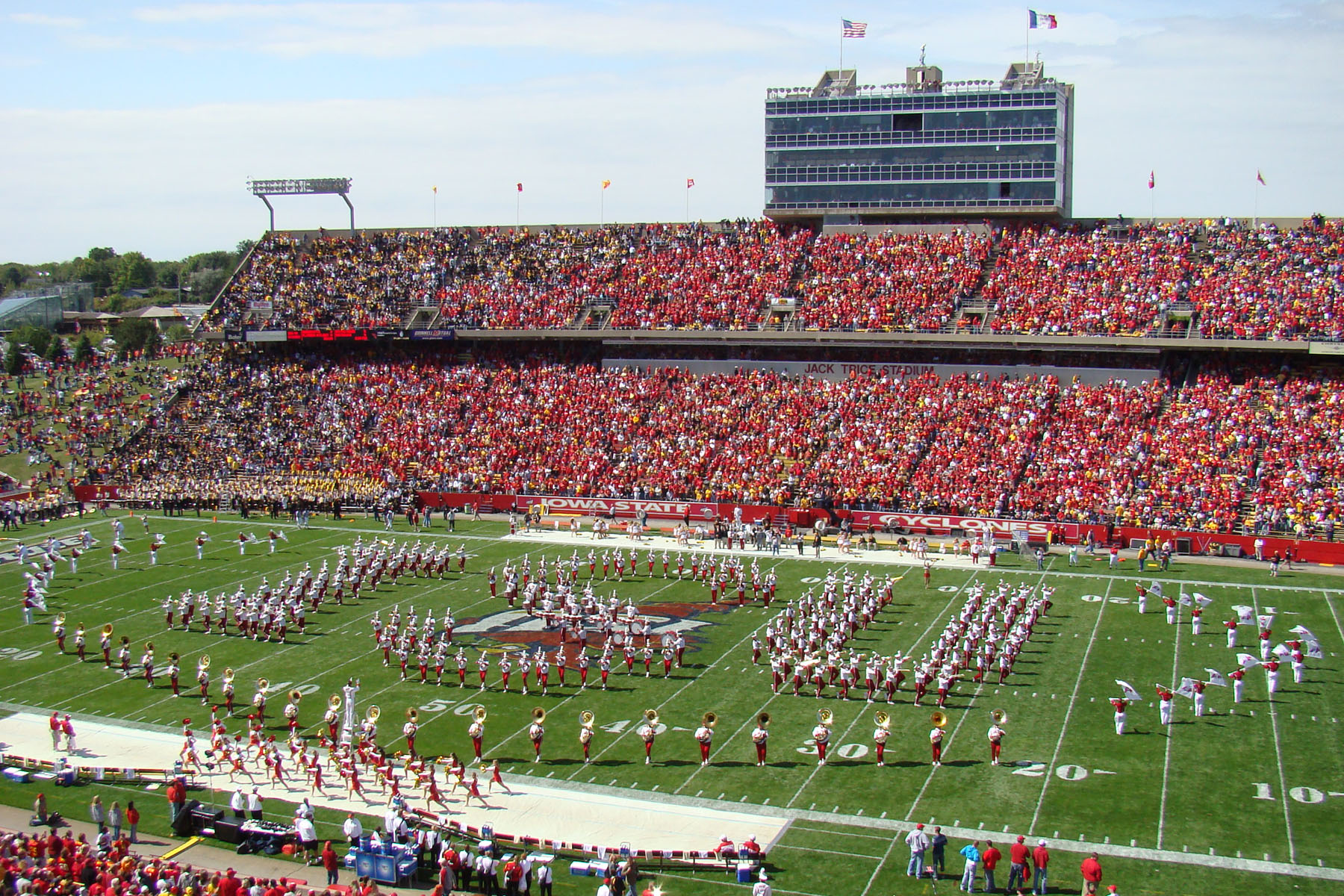
Jack Trice Stadium during a game

Jack Trice Stadium (formerly Cyclone Stadium) is a 61,500-seat stadium. The arena opened on September 20, 1975, with a win against Air Force). It is home to the Iowa State Cyclones football team. The current record for single-game attendance, 61,500, was set on September 5, 2015, when the Cyclones defeated the Northern Iowa 31–7. In 1997, the stadium was named in honor of Jack Trice, ISU's first African American athlete and the school's first athletics-related fatality. The stadium is the only one in Division I-A named for an African American individual.

Bergstrom Indoor Facility

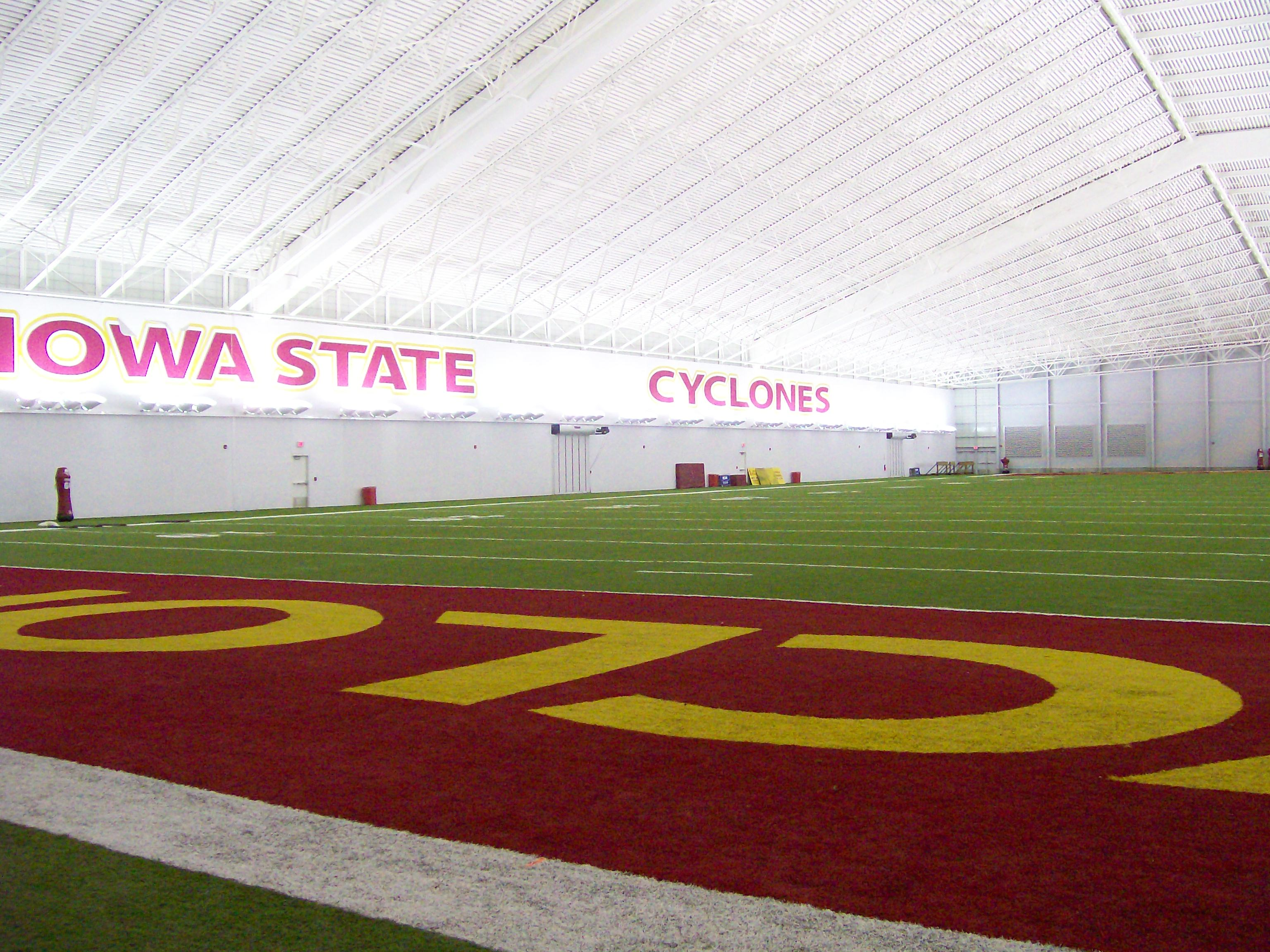
Bergstrom Indoor Practice Facility

The Steve and Debbie Bergstrom Indoor Training Facility opened in March 2004. It is a 92,000-square-foot (8,500 m^{2}) multi-purpose, indoor practice facility. Inside the facility is a full-sized astroturf football field. Though typically associated with football, it is also used for practice by the softball and soccer teams, as well as community events. The building sits just northwest of Jack Trice Stadium and is part of the Johnny Majors Practice Complex. The facility cost $9.6 million to build and was funded by private gifts to the athletic department and ISU Foundation.

On October 26, 2012, Iowa State dedicated a 20.6 million, 156,000 square-foot, expansion of the football facility with an additional lead gift from the Bergstrom family. This included replacing the playing surface of the indoor facility, a state-of-the-art strength and conditional facility, a coaches office complex, positional meeting rooms, an auditorium, and spacious locker rooms. This completed the goal for Iowa State to have a stand alone football-only training facility.

Cyclone Sports Complex

The $13 million Cyclone Sports Complex, the home of Iowa State track and field, soccer and softball opened in the fall of 2012. Some of the state-of-the-art facility's amenities are home and away locker rooms, officials' locker rooms, team meeting rooms, athletic training room, and a seating capacity of 1,500.

Veenker Memorial Golf Course

The 6,543-yard, par-72, George Veenker Memorial Golf Course is located just two blocks north of the Iowa State campus. The 18-hole course was constructed in 1938 from the design of world-renowned golf course architect, Perry Maxwell. The course hosted the conference championships in 1982 and 1989, two regional AIAW championships, and hosts the annual Iowa Masters Championship. It also hosted the 1949 NCAA national championship.

Beyer Hall

Beyer Hall is home to Iowa State's women's swimming and diving team and women's gymnastics team. The swimming and diving team practices and holds competition in the Beyer Pool, a six lane, T-shaped, 25-yard competitive pool with an attached diving well, and seating for approximately 800 spectators. The Beyer Pool has hosted the 1963 and 1971 NCAA meets, as well as numerous conference championships. Though the gymnastics team competes in Hilton Coliseum, they practice across the hall from Beyer Pool in the Amy and Dennis Pyle Family Gymnastics Facility. Renovated in 2002, the practice facility is used by collegiate and elementary athletes alike.

McKee Tennis Complex

The Bruce McKee Indoor Tennis Complex opened in 2016 as a tennis specific training and competition facility. McKee, a longtime athletics supporter and 1956 graduate of Iowa State, provided a $500,000 lead gift for the $2 million complex.

Cross Country Course

The $250,000, Iowa State Cross Country Course was dedicated in 1995 and was host of the NCAA Division I Cross Country Championships that fall, and again in 2000. The course runs through the Iowa State Arboretum and was the first course in the nation designed exclusively for competitive cross country racing.

Hixson-Lied Student Success Center

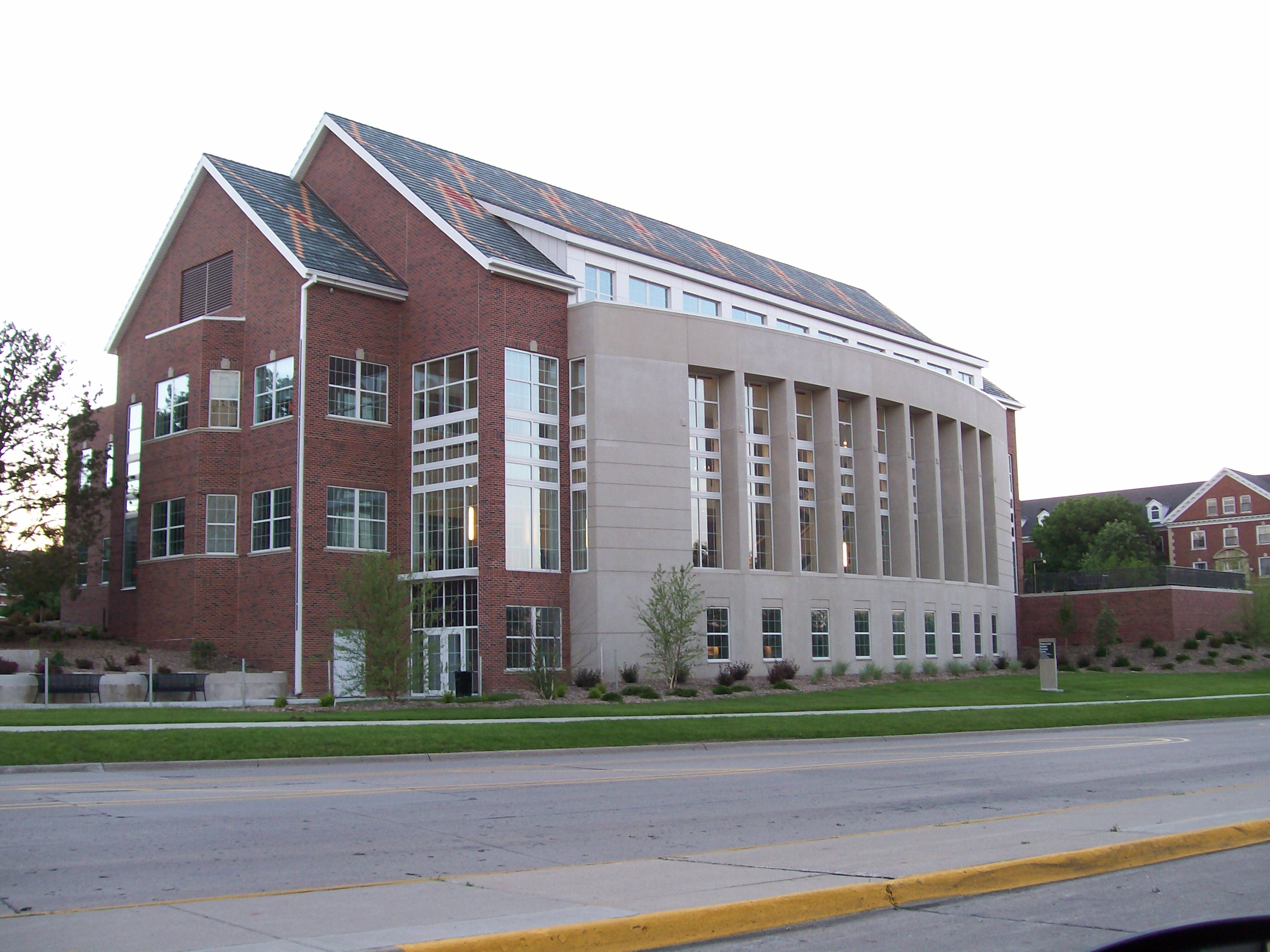
Hixson Lied Student Success Center

The 10 million dollar, Hixson-Lied Student Success Center, was designed for improving academic achievement campus wide, with the second floor devoted specifically to student athletes. The facility was built using private contributions. Since its completion in 2006, Iowa State student athletes have dramatically improved in the class room and now boast a higher average GPA (Grade point average) than the rest of the student body.

Jacobson Athletic Building

Built in 1995 and located off the north end zone of Jack Trice Stadium, The Jacobson Athletic Building formerly housed the football offices, locker rooms, meeting rooms, strength and conditioning room, and sports medicine room. The space was renovated in 2008 and 2009 to use the vacated space by the football team. It now is home to men's and women's golf, tennis, swimming, wrestling, cross country and track and field. This allows the entire athletic department staff to be under one roof with the exception of men's and women's basketball and volleyball.

Lied Recreation Center

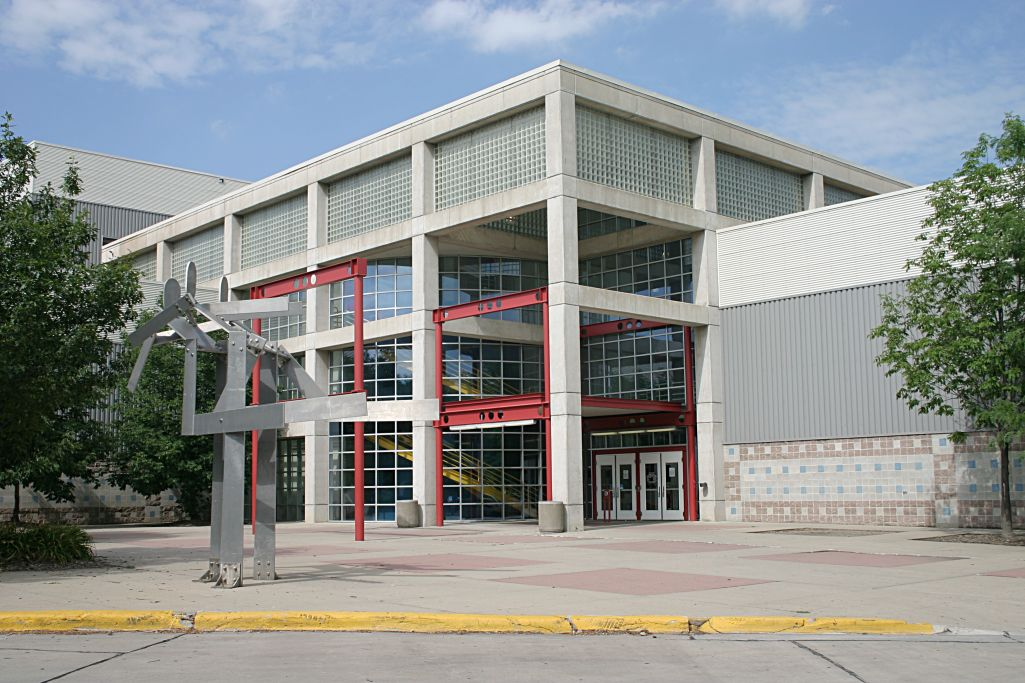
Lied Recreation Center

The Lied Recreation Center is a multi-purpose building housing the soccer team lockers, practice facility for wrestling, and a 300-meter track for indoor competition. The $13 million center, was host of the 1998, 2000, and 2007 indoor track and field Big 12 Championships. The new mondo track has eight 42-inch lanes, making it the largest and one of the fastest indoor surfaces in the world. There is portable seating for 2,000 spectators and also includes two long jump/triple jump pits and a pole vault runway. The facility also includes showers, saunas, steam rooms, and a sports medicine center.

ISU Soccer Complex

Built in 1995 when women's soccer was added as an official sport at Iowa State, the ISU Soccer Complex sits just east of the Lied Recreation Athletics Center. It was home to the women's soccer team until the Cyclone Sports Complex opened in 2012. It is now used for intramural and club sports.

== Director's Cup ==
The NACDA Director's Cup is an award given annually by the National Association of Collegiate Directors of Athletics to the colleges and universities with the most success in collegiate athletics. Points for the NACDA Director's Cup are based on order of finish in various NCAA sponsored championships or based on various polls. The following is Iowa State's finish in the Director's Cup since 1993:

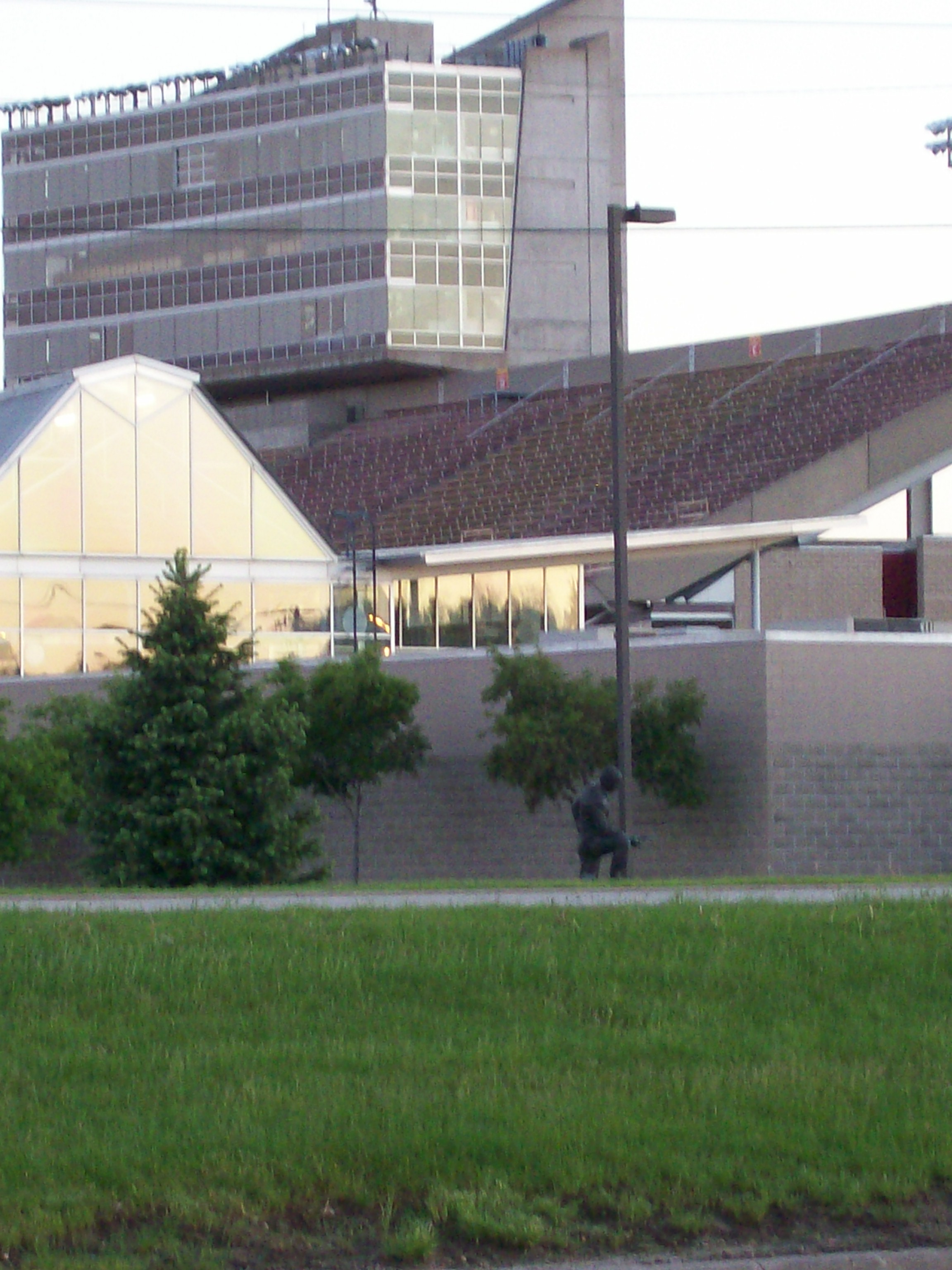
Jack Trice Stadium and the Jacobson and Olsen Building in foreground

ISU Director's Cup Standings
Year(s)	Standing
1993–94	58th
1994–95	49th
1995–96	40th
1996–97	41st
1997–98	62nd
1998–99	56th
1999-00	42nd
2000–01	54th
2001–02	58th
2002–03	107th
2003–04	123rd
2004–05	60th
2005–06	97th
2006–07	73rd
2007–08	58th
2008–09	58th
2009–10	34th
2010–11	60th
2011–12	46th
2012–13	41st
2013–14	38th
2014–15	45th
2015–16	64th
2016–17	59th
2017–18	56th
2018–19	53rd
2019–20	N/A (COVID)
2020–21	38th
2021–22	42nd
2022–23	59th

^indicates a current standing
Red indicates ranking down from previous year
Green indicates ranking up from previous year

== Athletic Director ==
Iowa State's athletic director is Jamie Pollard. Since his arrival in 2005, Pollard has replaced head coaches in football, wrestling, men's basketball, gymnastics, soccer, cross country/track & field, women's golf, tennis, and softball. Additionally, he has initiated major renovations to Hilton Coliseum, Jack Trice Stadium, constructed a basketball practice facility, and spearheaded the construction of CYTown.

== Voice of the Cyclones ==
From the early 1970s until his death on March 5, 2003, Pete Taylor was the "Voice of the Cyclones". Initially, Pete both worked the ISU events and was the sports director at KCCI TV, formerly KRNT TV. He provided play by play coverage of Iowa State Cyclones Athletics over the Cyclone network both on the radio and on the television. In 1990 after he left KCCI, Taylor joined the Iowa State staff full-time. Following Pete's death, John Walters succeeded Pete as the "Voice of the Cyclones" on June 17, 2003, providing play by play coverage on both the radio and the television. Initially, John both worked the ISU events and was the sports director at WOI TV. In June 2012, John left WOI TV and joined the Iowa State staff full-time.
