= Iowa State Cyclones women's golf =

Women's collegiate golf team

- Founded: 1976
- University: Iowa State University
- Conference: Big 12
- Head coach: Christie Martens (17th season)
- Location: Ames, Iowa
- Course: Veenker Memorial Golf Course; Par: 72; Yards: 6,543
- Nickname: Cyclones
- Colors: Cardinal and gold

NCAA Championship appearances
- 1972, 1975, 1982, 1993, 1994, 1995, 1996, 2010, 2011, 2012, 2013, 2014, 2015, 2016, 2026

Conference champions
- 1993, 2026

Individual conference champions
- Shelly Finnestad (1993)

The Iowa State Cyclones women's golf team represents Iowa State University (ISU) and competes in the Big 12 Conference of NCAA Division I. The team is coached by Christie Martens, she is in her 17th year at Iowa State. The Cyclones play their home meets at Veenker Memorial Golf Course on Iowa State's campus.

== History ==
The Iowa State women's golf team first got it start in 1972, initially competing in the Association for Intercollegiate Athletics for Women (AIAW). Off the heels of their hot start the Cyclones appeared in three AIAW Championships in their first 12 years of existence, finishing top 25 each time. During these early year individual success was highlighted by Barb Thomas, the high point of her career at ISU was becoming the first and only women's golf All-American in program history. Thomas would go on to have an 18-year career on the LPGA Tour.

After almost a decade of struggles Iowa State again flourished under coach Julie Manning. They reached the NCAA Regional four straight years from 1993-1996 in addition to their first and only Big Eight conference championship in 1993. Two individual successes during this time period were Beth Bader and Shelly Finnestad. Bader still holds the record for most top-10 and top-five finishes as a Cyclone with 24 and 12 respectively. She would finish second in the 1993 Big Eight conference championship to Shelly Finnestad before going on to having a 13-year LPGA Tour career. Finnestad's 1993 conference title remains the only Cyclone championship to date.

After another lull in success coach Christie Martens has taken the Cyclones to new heights. In her 17th year at Iowa State she is currently on a streak of seven straight NCAA regional appearances, including finishing 23rd overall at the 2014 NCAA National Championship. Some of the individual successes under her leadership include Punpaka Phuntumabamrung finishing as runner-up at the 2013 Big 12 Tournament and Chonlada Chayanun tying for seventh overall at the 2014 NCAA tournament.

In 2022, Ruby Chou became the first Iowa State player to individually qualify for the championship with an Iowa State Regional record of 211. She was soon joined by her teammate, Taglao Jeeravivitaporn, who defeated Northwestern's Jieni Li in a playoff for the second spot.

== Record ==
Record by Year
Year	Conference	Finish	National Tournament	Finish
1975	Big Eight	5th	AIAW Championship	17th
1976	Big Eight	6th		
1977	Big Eight	6th		
1978	Big Eight	6th		
1979	Big Eight	5th		
1980	Big Eight	4th		
1981	Big Eight	5th		
1982	Big Eight	5th	AIAW Championship	23rd
1983	Big Eight	6th		
1984	Big Eight	5th		
1985	Big Eight	5th		
1986	Big Eight	4th		
1987	Big Eight	T-5th		
1988	Big Eight	6th		
1989	Big Eight	6th		
1990	Big Eight	6th		
1991	Big Eight	6th		
1992	Big Eight	6th		
1993	Big Eight	1st	NCAA East Regional	11th
1994	Big Eight	3rd	NCAA East Regional	19th
1995	Big Eight	2nd	NCAA East Regional	18th
1996	Big Eight	2nd	NCAA East Regional	15th
1997	Big 12	11th		
1998	Big 12	8th		
1999	Big 12	10th		
2000	Big 12	11th		
2001	Big 12	10th		
2002	Big 12	5th		
2003	Big 12	9th		
2004	Big 12	11th		
2005	Big 12	12th		
2006	Big 12	8th		
2007	Big 12	12th		
2008	Big 12	9th		
2009	Big 12	8th		
2010	Big 12	4th	NCAA West Regional	10th
2011	Big 12	4th	NCAA West Regional	10th
2012	Big 12	4th	NCAA West Regional	T14th
2013	Big 12	3rd	NCAA Central Regional	16th
2014	Big 12	T-4th	NCAA Championship	23rd
2015	Big 12	T-4th	NCAA Raleigh Regional	T-10th
2016	Big 12	4th	NCAA Shoal Creek Regional	T-13th
2017	Big 12	2nd	NCAA Lubbock Regional	10th
2018	Big 12	4th	NCAA Madison Regional	10th
2019	Big 12	8th	NCAA Cle Elum Regional	11th
2021	Big 12	8th	NCAA Stanford Regional	14th
2022	Big 12	4th	NCAA Stanford Regional	9th

== All-conference selections ==
All-Conference Selections
Year	Name
1980	Barb Thomas
1982	Dawn Kain
1984	Connie Carlson
1986	Joan Fails
1993	Shelley Finnestad
1993	Maureen Roushar
1993	Beth Bader
1993	Missy Arthur
1994	Beth Bader
1994	Missy Arthur
1995	Janea Carter
1996	Holly Duncan
1996	Fiona Watson
2005	Louise Kenney
2006	Jessica Shin
2010	Punpaka Phuntumabamrung
2010	Laurence Herman
2010	Pennapa Pulsawath

All-Conference Selections
Year	Name
2011	Victoria Stefansen
2011	Laurence Herman
2011	Sasikarn On-iam
2011	Prima Thammaraks
2012	Punpaka Phuntumabamrung
2013	Punpaka Phuntumabamrung
2014	Sasikarn On-iam
2014	Chonlada Chayanun
2015	Chonlada Chayanun
2015	Cajsa Persson
2015	Nattapan Siritrai
2015	Celia Barquín
2015	Cajsa Persson
2016	Celia Barquín
2016	Chayanit Wangmahaporn

== Veenker Memorial Golf Course ==
Named for George F. Veenker, head football coach at Iowa State from 1931 to 1936. He was also Athletic Director from 1933 until 1945. The golf course was completed in 1938 and given its current name in 1959.

The 6,543-yard, par-72, George Veenker Memorial Golf Course is located just two blocks north of the Iowa State campus. The 18-hole course was constructed in 1938 from the design of world-renowned golf course architect, Perry Maxwell (re-designer of the seventh and 10th holes at Augusta National Golf Club in 1937). The golf course was built with WPA and Athletic Council funds, and cost $122,373. The course hosted the conference championships in 1982 and 1989, two regional AIAW championships, and hosts the annual Iowa Masters Championship. It also hosted the 1949 NCAA national championship, in which Arnold Palmer was a participant.

The team practices at the newly opened $2 million Golf Performance Center located three miles from campus. The 16-acre facility was designed by world renowned architech Keith Foster to be used exclusively by the Iowa State men's and women's golf team.
