= Jared Benko =

American athletics director

Current position
- Title: Athletic director
- Team: Iowa State
- Conference: Big 12

Biographical details
- Education: University of Georgia

Administrative career (AD unless noted)
- 2008–2011: Georgia (assistant director of business operations)
- 2011–2015: Arkansas (director of business operations)
- 2015–2016: Auburn (assistant AD)
- 2016–2020: Mississippi State (deputy AD)
- 2020–2024: Georgia Southern
- 2024-2026: Auburn (Executive Deputy AD)
- 2026–present: Iowa State

Jared Benko is the current director of athletics at Iowa State University. He previously served as executive deputy athletic director at Auburn University, athletic director for Georgia Southern University, deputy athletic director for Mississippi State University, assistant athletic director for Auburn University, and in various administrative positions for the University of Arkansas and the University of Georgia. Benko attended college at the University of Georgia, where he graduated with a bachelor's degree in sports studies in 2005, and a master's degree in public administration in 2007. Benko was named athletic director at Georgia Southern University on March 5, 2020. On October 16, 2026, he was announced to be the new Jamie & Ellen Pollard Endowed Director of Athletics at Iowa State University.
