= Celia Barquín Arozamena =

Spanish golfer (1996–2018)

Personal information
- Nationality: Spain
- Born: 6 July 1996 Puente San Miguel, Reocín, Cantabria, Spain
- Died: 17 September 2018 (aged 22) Ames, Iowa, U.S.

Career
- Sport: Golf
- College: Iowa State University
- Status: Amateur

Best results in LPGA major championships
- Chevron Championship: DNP
- Women's PGA C'ship: DNP
- U.S. Women's Open: CUT: 2018
- Women's British Open: DNP
- Evian Championship: DNP

Celia Barquín Arozamena (6 July 1996 – 17 September 2018) was a Spanish amateur golfer. She won the 2018 European Ladies Amateur Championship.

On 17 September 2018 at 10:24 a.m., the Ames Police Department were called and discovered Barquín's dead body at the Coldwater Golf Links in Ames, Iowa. (Note: The Iowa State Cyclones golf teams play their home meets at Veenker Memorial Golf Course on Iowa State's campus.) Collin Richards, a 22-year-old homeless man who had been living in an encampment near the golf course, was charged with her murder. An acquaintance said Richards had told him that he had "an urge to rape and kill a woman" according to The New York Times.

== Career ==
Barquín was born in Puente San Miguel and educated in Torrelavega and then in Madrid. She spent two years in a residential training programme run by the Spanish Sports Council before moving to the United States, where she was a member of the Iowa State Cyclones women's golf team from 2014 to 2018 and was the Iowa State University Female Athlete of the Year for 2018.

She played for Spain at the 2015 and 2016 European Ladies' Team Championship, where the team finished third and second respectively. She won the 2018 European Ladies Amateur Championship held at the Penati Golf Resort in Slovakia, finishing a stroke ahead of Esther Henseleit. In the third round, she set a course record of 63. She qualified for the 2018 U.S. Women's Open, where she missed the cut. In 2018, she reached Stage II of the LPGA Q-School, which is to be played in mid-October.

== Death ==
Barquín was in her final year of a degree in civil engineering after completing her eligibility for the university golf team with the 2017–2018 season. On 17 September 2018 at 10:24 a.m., the Ames Police Department were called and discovered her dead body at the Coldwater Golf Links in Ames, Iowa. (Note: The Iowa State Cyclones golf teams play their home meets at Veenker Memorial Golf Course on Iowa State's campus.) Collin Richards, a 22-year-old homeless man who had been living in an encampment near the golf course, was charged with her murder. An acquaintance said Richards had told him that he had "an urge to rape and kill a woman" according to The New York Times. He pled guilty to first degree murder and was sentenced on 23 August 2019 to life in prison.

== Memorial ==
Barquín, the most accomplished women's golfer in Iowa State University history, was honored on Saturday, 22 September 2018, at Jack Trice Stadium in Ames, Iowa. At 10:50 a.m. CDT (UTC−05:00), a video tribute and a moment of silence in honor of her occurred before the Iowa State vs. Akron football game. Fans wore her favorite color, yellow. Proceeds from the sale of yellow T-shirts with her initials, CBA, on the front went to the "Remembering Celia Memorial Fund". Additionally, in her honor, both the Iowa State and the Akron Zips football teams wore her initials, CBA, as a decal on their helmets and the Iowa State University Cyclone Football Varsity Marching Band formed a CBA during their routine. Posthumously, Barquín received a civil engineering diploma from Iowa State University.

Prior to her death, Barquín was to receive the Iowa State female student-athlete of the year award at Jack Trice Stadium on 22 September 2018.

=== 2018 Ryder Cup ===
During the 2018 Ryder Cup, all players, both the United States and the European Union, wore yellow ribbons with her name, Celia, on them in her honor at Le Golf National.

=== Remembering Celia Memorial Fund ===
The Remembering Celia Memorial Fund was established for the family of Barquín. All money collected will be used to honor her memory and directed to her family.

== Amateur wins ==
- 2011 Grand Prix de Chiberta
- 2012 Grand Prix de Chiberta
- 2013 Grand Prix de Chiberta, Campeonato Excmo Ayto de Llanes
- 2014 Campeonato del Principado de Asturias Absoluto
- 2017 Copa Match Play Comunidad Valenciana
- 2018 Big 12 Women's Championship, European Ladies Amateur Championship

== Team appearances ==
- Summer Youth Olympics (representing Spain): 2014
- European Ladies' Team Championship (representing Spain): 2015, 2016, 2017, 2018
