= Bill Bergan =

American athletics coach (1942–2022)

Biographical details
- Born: April 1, 1942; Cedar Falls, Iowa, U.S.
- Died: November 22, 2022 (aged 80)
- Education: Northern Iowa

Playing career
- 1961–1965: Northern Iowa

Coaching career (HC unless noted)
- 1965–1971: Waterloo Columbus HS
- 1971–1995: Iowa State

Accomplishments and honors

Championships
- NCAA Men's Cross Country Championship (1989 1994)

Awards
- NCAA Coach of the Year (1983 1986); US Track & Field Hall of Fame; Iowa State Cyclones Hall of Fame; Drake Relays Hall of Fame; University of Northern Iowa Hall of Fame; Roy Griak Hall of Fame; Columbus High School Hall of Fame

Bill Bergan (April 1, 1942 – November 22, 2022) was an American college athletics coach. A two-time NCAA championship-winning head coach with the Iowa State Cyclones Cross Country team, he also worked with the Iowa State Cyclones track and field team. He was the founder and CEO of Ames, Iowa-based Championship Productions.

Bergan died on November 22, 2022, at the age of 80.
