= Beth Bader =

American professional golfer (born 1973)

Personal information
- Nationality: United States
- Born: August 30, 1973 (age 53) Davenport, Iowa, U.S.
- Height: 5 ft 10 in (1.78 m)

Career
- Sport: Golf
- College: Iowa State University
- Turned professional: 1997
- Former tours: LPGA Tour (2000–12); Futures Tour

Best results in LPGA major championships
- Chevron Championship: T47: 2008
- Women's PGA C'ship: T20: 2005
- U.S. Women's Open: T47: 2005
- Women's British Open: T23: 2007

Beth Bader (born August 30, 1973) is an American professional golfer who has played on the LPGA Tour. Bader competed on the Tour for more than a decade, and her highest career finish was a tie for fourth at the 2007 LPGA Corning Classic. She made more than $1 million in career earnings.

== Career ==
After attending Iowa State University, Bader played on the Futures Tour for four years before gaining her LPGA Tour card at the 2000 LPGA Final Qualifying Tournament. In her second LPGA season, 2002, she posted a top-five result at the Giant Eagle LPGA Classic. Having finished 90th and 91st, respectively, in the 2002 and 2003 season money lists, Bader fell to 113th in 2004. At the 2004 LPGA Final Qualifying Tournament, she won her card for the following year. Bader earned over $100,000 in 2005 and 2006, and made a career-high $286,761 in 2007. She was 119th on the money list in 2008, down from 46th the previous year. In 2009, her earnings of over $125,000 placed her 74th on the Tour. Over the next four years, Bader did not finish higher than 119th in annual earnings.

== Awards and honors ==
In 2006, Bader was inducted into the Iowa State Cyclones Hall of Fame.

== Results in LPGA majors ==
Tournament	2001	2002	2003	2004	2005	2006	2007	2008	2009	2010	2011	2012
Kraft Nabisco Championship						CUT		T47		CUT		
LPGA Championship	CUT	CUT	CUT		T20	CUT	CUT	CUT	T31	CUT	CUT	CUT
U.S. Women's Open		CUT	CUT	CUT	T47	62	CUT		CUT			
Women's British Open		CUT	CUT		CUT	CUT	T23					

Did not play

CUT = missed the half-way cut
"T" = tied

== LPGA Tour career summary ==
Year	Tournaments played	Cuts made	Wins	2nds	3rds	Top 10s	Best finish	Earnings ($)	Money list rank	Scoring average
2001	26	10	0	0	0	0	T30	25,422	140	74.43
2002	24	10	0	0	0	1	T5	72,335	90	74.08
2003	24	12	0	0	0	0	T16	72,030	91	72.72
2004	22	12	0	0	0	0	T24	52,399	113	73.31
2005	22	13	0	0	0	1	T10	147,720	64	73.40
2006	26	17	0	0	0	0	T12	113,401	83	72.94
2007	24	19	0	0	0	2	T4	286,761	46	72.33
2008	24	13	0	0	0	0	T25	78,808	119	73.83
2009	18	13	0	0	0	1	T6	125,894	74	72.25
2010	14	3	0	0	0	0	T22	22,558	125	74.26
2011	9	2	0	0	0	0	T26	21,956	119	74.30
2012	11	2	0	0	0	0	T28	18,337	130	74.16
2013	1	0	0	0	0	0	MC	0	N/A	79.00

- Official as of 2013 season. Sources:
