= ISU Fights =

Iowa State University fight song

"ISU Fights" is the fight song of Iowa State University. It is often played at sporting events, and otherwise it is mostly only sung by the Iowa Statesmen, the official men's choir of Iowa State, which generally sings the song at the end of their concerts, as part of a collection of school songs, starting with "Rise, Sons of Iowa State," "For I, For S, For Ever," the alma mater "Bells of Iowa State," and then finally "ISU Fights." These songs are often collectively referred to as the Iowa State Fight Songs, though "ISU Fights" is the official fight song." The song was written in the 1930s by Paul Gnam, a brother of Sigma Alpha Epsilon fraternity.

== Lyrics ==
O we will fight, fight, fight for Iowa State,
And may her colors ever fly.
Yes, we will fight with might for Iowa State,
With a will to do or die,
Rah! Rah! Rah!
Loyal sons forever true,
And we will fight the battle through.
And when we hit that line we'll hit it hard
every yard for I.S.U.
