= Iowa State Cyclones women's swimming and diving =

Iowa State Cyclones swimming and diving
- Founded: 1970; 56 years ago
- University: Iowa State University
- Head coach: Matt Leach (2nd season)
- Conference: Big 12 Conference
- Location: Ames, Iowa, US
- Home pool: Beyer Hall
- Nickname: Cyclones

Women's Conference Champions
- 1974

The Iowa State Cyclones women's swimming and diving team represents Iowa State University (ISU) and competes in the Big 12 Conference of NCAA Division I. The team is coached by Matt Leach, who has led Iowa State since the 2024-2025 season. The Cyclones host their home meets at Beyer Pool on Iowa State's campus.

== History ==
Iowa State first had club swim teams dating back to the 1920s but first put together a varsity squad for the 1970–71 year. They were able to capture their first Big Eight Title in 1974 under coach Deidre Singleton.

Head Coach Ramsey Van Horn was hired in 1979 to lead the Cyclones. Iowa State experienced a considerable amount of individual success under Ramsey including 15 All-Americans and 21 Conference Champions. Ramsey was let go in 1997.

4-time All-American Matt “the technician” Leach took over as head coach beginning at the 2024–2025 season He is assisted by Jeff Warrick who is a diving specialist.

== Record ==
Record
Big Eight (1973–1996)
Year	Head Coach	Dual Record	Conference Tournament	Postseason
1970–71	Deidra Singleton	3-0	–	–
1971–72	Deidra Singleton	2-0	–	–
1972–73	Deidra Singleton	3-1	–	–
1973–74	Deidra Singleton	3-0	1st	–
1974–75	Deidra Singleton	1-0	2nd	–
1975–76	Deidra Singleton	2-1	2nd	–
1976–77	Deidra Singleton	3-3	5th	–
1977–78	Bobb Bottger	1–3	6th	–
1978–79	Bobb Bottger	5-1	5th	–
1979–80	Ramsey Van Horn	6-1	2nd	–
1980–81	Ramsey Van Horn	5-5	4th	–
1981–82	Ramsey Van Horn	7-2	3rd	–
1982–83	Ramsey Van Horn	3–4	3rd	–
1983–84	Ramsey Van Horn	0–8	5th	–
1984–85	Ramsey Van Horn	6-4	4th	–
1985–86	Ramsey Van Horn	2–7	4th	–
1986–87	Ramsey Van Horn	3–8	3rd	–
1987–88	Ramsey Van Horn	5–6	3rd	–
1988–89	Ramsey Van Horn	5-5	3rd	–
1989–90	Ramsey Van Horn	5-5	3rd	–
1990–91	Ramsey Van Horn	6-4	3rd	–
1991–92	Ramsey Van Horn	5–6	3rd	–
1992–93	Ramsey Van Horn	4–6	3rd	–
1993–94	Ramsey Van Horn	5-5	3rd	–
1994–95	Ramsey Van Horn	6-6	4th	–
1995–96	Ramsey Van Horn	4-2	4th	–
Big 12 (1996–Present)
Year	Head Coach	Dual Record	Conference Tournament	Postseason
1996–97	Ramsey Van Horn	5–7	6th	–
1997–98	Duane Sorenson	4–7	6th	–
1998–99	Duane Sorenson	4–5	6th	–
1999-00	Duane Sorenson	5-5	6th	–
2000–01	Duane Sorenson	6-4	5th	–
2001–02	Duane Sorenson	6-4	4th	–
2002–03	Duane Sorenson	7-2	5th	–
2003–04	Duane Sorenson	5–6	5th	–
2004–05	Duane Sorenson	3–6	6th	–
2005–06	Duane Sorenson	5-4	6th	–
2006–07	Duane Sorenson	5-4	6th	–
2007–08	Duane Sorenson	5-4	5th	–
2008–09	Duane Sorenson	6-5	5th	–
2009–10	Duane Sorenson	8-4	5th	–
2010–11	Duane Sorenson	5-5	6th	–
2011–12	Duane Sorenson	5-3	5th	–
2012–13	Duane Sorenson	4–5	5th	–
2013–14	Duane Sorenson	7-3-1	3rd	–
2014–15	Duane Sorenson	7-4	2nd	–
2015–16	Duane Sorenson	6-5	3rd	–
2016-17	Duane Sorenson	3-4-1	3rd	–
2017-18	Duane Sorenson	4-5	4th	–
2018-19	Duane Sorenson	7-4	5th	–
2019-20	Duane Sorenson	5-5	4th	–
2020-21	Duane Sorenson	2-1	5th	–
Total	–	208-184-1	–	–

== Individual Accomplishments ==
=== Swimming Conference Champions ===
Big 12 Swimming Champions
Year	Player	Event
1974	Cindy Leigh	50 Yard Backstroke 100 Yard Backstroke; 200 Yard Individual Medley; 200 Yard Medley Relay; 400 Yard Medley Relay; 400 Freestyle Relay
1974	Debbie Wright	100 Yard Individual Medley 50 Yard Butterfly; 100 Yard Butterfly; 200 Yard Medley Relay; 400 Yard Medley Relay; 400 Freestyle Relay
1974	Barb Beatty	200 Yard Medley Relay 400 Yard Medley Relay; 400 Freestyle Relay
1974	Jo Kelly	200 Yard Medley Relay; 400 Yard Medley Relay; 400 Freestyle Relay
1975	Cindy Leigh	50 Yard Relay 200 Yard Medley Relay
1975	Sharon Waterstreet	50 Yard Relay 200 Yard Medley Relay
1975	Jo Kelly	50 Yard Relay 200 Yard Medley Relay
1976	Cindy Leigh	50 Yard Backstroke 200 Yard Medley Relay
1976	Anne Beran	200 Yard Medley Relay
1976	Muriel MacBride	200 Yard Medley Relay
1976	Sharon Waterstreet	200 Yard Medley Relay
1979	Sue Wyatt	50 Yard Breaststroke
1979	Theresa Morse	50 Yard Backstroke
1980	Theresa Morse	50 Yard Backstroke
1980	Lynn Ellis	400 Yard Individual Medley
1981	Theresa Morse	50 Yard Backstroke
1982	Tanya Roach	500 Yard Freestyle
1983	Tanya Roach	500 Yard Freestyle
1984	Jeanne Fleck	400 Yard Medley Relay
1984	Lisa Fraser	400 Yard Medley Relay
1984	Karen Groth	400 Yard Medley Relay
1984	Mary Coluccy	400 Yard Medley Relay
1988	Jenni Adams	100 Yard Breaststroke
1989	Jenni Adams	100 Yard Breaststroke 200 Yard Breaststroke
1991	Jenni Adams	50 Yard Freestyle
1998	Kim Reid	100 Yard Breaststroke
1999	Kim Reid	100 Yard Breaststroke

=== Diving Conference Champions ===
Big 12 Diving Champions
Year	Player	Event
1974	Mary Hartmann	1-Meter Dive
1974	Laura Vernon	3-Meter Dive
1977	Laura Vernon	1-Meter Dive
1980	MaryAnn Eadie	1-Mete Dive 3-Meter Dive
1986	Janet Lahti	1-Mete Dive 3-Meter Dive
1987	Janet Lahti	3-Meter Dive
1992	Katie Grinnell	1-Meter Dive
2005	Hillary Nichols	Platform Dive

=== All-Americans ===
All-Americans
Year	Player	Event
1982	Tanya Roach	500 Free; 1,650 Free
1982	Karen Groth	50 Fly; 100 Fly; 200 Medley Relay; 400 Medley Relay
1982	Lynn Ellis	200 Butterfly
1982	Annette Ackerson	200 Medley Relay; 400 Medley Relay
1982	Lisa Fraser	200 Medley Relay; 400 Medley Relay
1982	Mary Coluccy	200 Medley Relay; 400 Medley Relay
1983	Karen Groth	50 Butterfly
1989	Jenni Adams	100 Breaststroke

== Facilities ==
Beyer Hall Pool is the site of Cyclone home swimming meets. The facility houses a six-lane, T-shaped, 25-yard competitive pool with an attached diving well. The pool has permanent spectator seating for approximately 800 people. The competitive pool has a variable depth bottom and turbulence reducing gutters. Beyer pool is also equipped with a Colorado electronic timing system and a seven-line scoreboard display. Underwater viewing windows aid the coaching staff with stroke correction and videotape stroke analysis.

Beyer's diving well has two 1-meter diving boards, two 3-meter diving boards and a 5-meter platform. The 5-meter platform and 1-meter diving boards are on concrete stands. The 3-meter boards are on Durafirm stands and all diving boards are Maxiflex model “B” springboards. Next to the diving well are a trampoline and a dry-board that is fully equipped with a spotting rig designed to help divers learn and perfect somersaulting and twisting dives. The pool also has two TIVO video systems that capture dives off each board and platform allowing divers to quickly view the dive they just performed.

Beyer has been the home of the 1962 and 1971 NCAA meets as well as numerous conference championships.
