= Ed Gagnier (gymnast) =

Canadian former gymnast (born 1936)

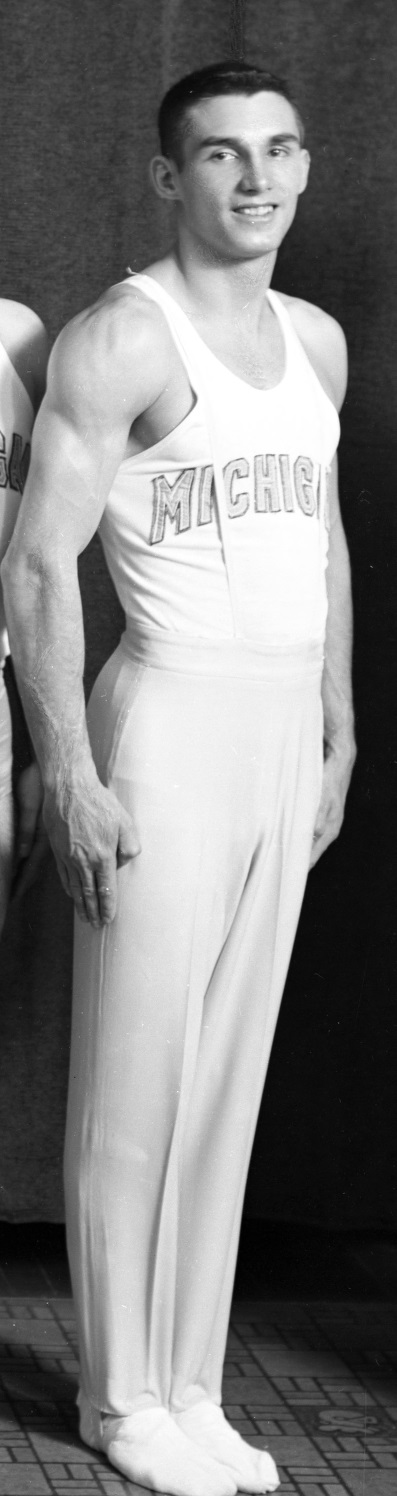
- Gagnier for Michigan gymnastics in 1957

Personal information
- Full name: Edward R. Gagnier
- Born: February 1, 1936 (age 90) Windsor, Ontario, Canada

Gymnastics career
- Discipline: Men's artistic gymnastics
- Country represented: Canada
- College team: Michigan Wolverines
- Coaching career

Coaching career (HC unless noted)
- 1963–1983: Iowa State Cyclones

Accomplishments and honors

Championships
- 3 NCAA team championships (1971, 1973 and 1974), 8 Big Eight Conference championships

Awards
- 3-time national coach of the year

Edward R. Gagnier (born February 1, 1936) is a Canadian former gymnast and gymnastics coach. He was a gymnast at the University of Michigan from 1956 to 1958. He was selected as an All-American in 1956 and also became the first gymnast to represent Canada at the Olympic Games. He was the head coach of the gymnastics program at Iowa State University from 1961 to 1983 and led his teams to NCAA championships in 1971, 1973, and 1974. He was inducted into the U.S. Gymnastics Hall of Fame in 1982.

== Early life ==
Gagnier grew up in Windsor, Ontario, Canada. He joined his high school gymnastics team at age 14.

== Gymnastics career ==
As a member of the Michigan Wolverines gymnastics teams, he won five Big Ten Conference championships—the 1957 all-around championship, the 1956 and 1957 vault championships, and the 1956 and 1957 parallel bars championships. In 1956, he was also selected as an All-American in the parallel bars and all-around.

Gagnier became Canada's first Olympic gymnast, representing his home country at the 1956 Summer Olympics in Melbourne, Australia. Gagnier graduated from the University of Michigan in 1958 with a bachelor of arts degree in physical education.

== Coaching career ==
After leaving the University of Michigan, Gagnier coached gymnastics in Milwaukee, Wisconsin. In 1961, he was hired by Iowa State University to create a gymnastic program. The program began as a club sport. He served as the head gymnastics coach at Iowa State for 22 years. His teams won the NCAA team championships in 1971, 1973, and 1974. They also won eight Big Eight Conference championships. He retired as Iowa State's gymnastics coach in 1983 but remained in Ames, Iowa, as the school's promotions director for the athletic department.

== Awards and honors ==
Gagnier was inducted into the U.S. Gymnastics Hall of Fame in 1982. In 1992, he was inducted into the University of Michigan Athletic Hall of Honor. A banner of Gagnier was hung from the rafters of Hilton Coliseum on February 20, 2015.

== Personal life ==
Gagnier was also the author of "Inside Gymnastics," published in 1974.
