= National Dance Alliance =

The National Dance Alliance (NDA), originally named NCA Superstar, was established in 1999. NDA is the sister company of the National Cheerleaders Association (NCA), which was founded by Lawrence Herkimer in 1948. In 1976, NCA created NCA Superstar to make a distinction between the dance and cheerleading aspects of the company. Eventually in 1999, NCA Superstar changed its name to the National Dance Alliance.

NDA is an organization that provides training and teaching to middle school, high school, and college dance teams around the country. NDA hosts many camps, clinics, competitions, and various performance events throughout the year for dancers to attend. Each year, NCA & NDA hosts over 75,000 cheerleaders and dancers at their summer camps and over 1,500 teams from 45 states at their National Championships.

== History ==
Lawrence Herkimer founded the NCA in 1948. The NCA was the first cheerleading company to hold camps and clinics that invited cheerleaders and dancers from around the country to learn new tricks and improve their technique under the supervision of trained and qualified instructors. The NCA had always incorporated dance into its programs, by allowing dance, pom-pom, or drill teams to learn alongside the cheerleaders. In 1976, the company made a distinction between cheerleading and dance by creating the NCA Superstar as the dance section of the company. The NCA Superstar eventually changed its name to the National Dance Alliance in 1999. The National Dance Alliance brand was established and is now a “full service provider in the dance spirit industry”.

NCA & NDA are both a part of the Varsity Spirit Corporation, an organization that hosts competitions, offers camps and clinics to train dancers and cheerleaders, and sells cheer and dance apparel.

== Camps ==
The National Dance Alliance extends invitations to high school and college dance teams from all over the country to attend its summer or fall camps. Many of these camps are held at university campuses, hotels, and convention centers. Teams that attend NDA Summer Camps get evaluated and receive personalized feedback from members of the NDA staff. These camps are intended to prepare teams for their upcoming season.

=== Overnight Camps ===
NDA Overnight Camps are either a three- or four-day sessions, available to teams at all technical levels. All NDA Overnight Camps offer classes that benefit all levels of training including beginner, intermediate, advanced and elite. The overnight camp experience gives participants the opportunity to audition for the NDA All-American Team.

=== Day Camps ===
NDA Day Camps are two-, three-, or four-day sessions for teams that are not able to or would prefer not to attend an overnight camp option. NDA Day Camps consist of the same curriculum as NDA Overnight Camps; however, classes are held earlier in the day giving participants the ability to go home in the evening. Classes are offered in all styles of dance, for all levels. Dancers are also eligible to audition for All-American at an NDA Day Camp.

== Competitions ==
The National Dance Alliance gives dance teams the opportunity to compete against one another at NDA Regional, Classic and National Championships. The invitation to compete at these competitions is extended to school and college dance teams, as well as All-Star dance programs. The competitions are split up based on whether the dance team is at the collegiate, school, or all-star level. Each year, NCA and NDA administer about 40 local, regional and national competitions nationwide.

=== Nationals ===
To compete at an NDA National Championship, the rulebook states that teams must have qualified at an NDA Summer or Fall Camp, Regional or Classic competition, or by video submission. At the collegiate level, teams can be offered bids to the National Competition based on the team's participation, conduct, and achievements at camp.

=== Regional & Classic Championships ===
NDA offers high school teams, middle school teams and All-Star programs the opportunity to compete in their Regional or Classic championships. These competitions allow for teams to compete against other dance teams in their region.
