= Jing Gao (computer scientist) =

Chinese-American computer scientist

Jing Gao is a Chinese and American computer scientist whose research applies machine learning to data mining, with topics including causal inference, anomaly detection, and truth discovery. She is a full professor of electrical and computer engineering and University Faculty Scholar at Purdue University.

== Education and career ==
After bachelor's and master's degrees from the Harbin Institute of Technology in China, Gao received a 2011 Ph.D. from the University of Illinois Urbana-Champaign (UIUC), where her dissertation was supervised by Jiawei Han.

She became an assistant professor at the University at Buffalo, and earned tenure as an associate professor there, before moving to her present position at Purdue, in 2021.

== Recognition ==
Gao received the ICDM Tao Li Award at the 2020 International Conference on Data Mining. In 2022, the UIUC Siebel School of Computing and Data Science gave Gao their Early Career Academic Achievement Alumni Award. She was named to the 2026 class of IEEE Fellows, "for contributions to addressing the multifaceted challenges of big data analytics".
