= Irena Vaišvilaitė =

Lithuanian diplomat (born 1954)

Irena Vaišvilaitė (born December 30, 1954) is a Lithuanian historian and diplomat who served as Lithuania ambassador to the Holy See and later Permanent Representative to the United Nations Education, Scientific and Cultural Organization (UNESCO).

== Education ==
Vaišvilaitė was born in Pasvalys. She obtained a degree in art history from Moscow University in 1984 and studied church history at the Gregorian University in Rome graduating in 1998.

== Career ==
She taught at the Lithuanian Art Institute from 1978 to 1986 and Vilnius University as an associate professor from 1998 to 2012. From 1986 to 1991 she worked at the Lithuanian Institute of Philosophy and Sociology. She was editor of Vatican Radio programs for Lithuania between 1991 and 1998 and later served as editor of Radio Free Europe in Prague from 2001 to 2004 before her appointment as chief adviser to President Valdas Adamkus from 2004 to 2007. She was then appointed vice-rector of the European Humanities University in Vilnius from 2008 until 2012 when she became the Lithuanian ambassador to the Holy See and to the Order of Malta. She was redeployed to UNESCO in 2017 and served there till 2019.

== Awards ==
- Grand Cross of the Order of Pope Pius IX by the Holy See, 2015.
- Grand Cross of the Order Pro merito Melitensi by Order of Malta, 2016
- Grand Cross of the Order of Merit of the Italian Republic, 2017.
