= Gene Taylor (athletic director) =

American university sports administrator (born 1957)

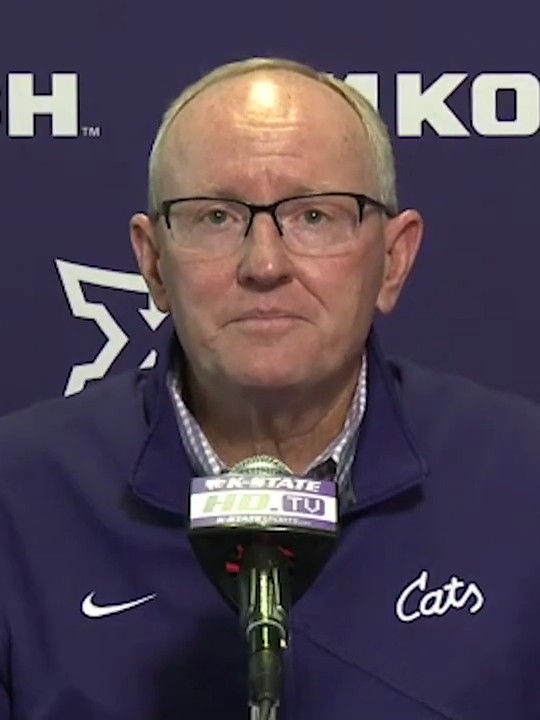
- Taylor in 2020

Current position
- Title: Athletic director
- Team: Kansas State
- Conference: Big 12 Conference

Biographical details
- Born: July 22, 1957 (age 69); Safford, Arizona, U.S.
- Education: Arizona State University (1980); St. Thomas University (1985)

Administrative career (AD unless noted)
- 1985–1986: SMU (ticket office)
- 1986–2001: Navy (associate AD)
- 2001–2014: North Dakota State
- 2014–2017: Iowa (deputy AD)
- 2017– Present: Kansas State

Accomplishments and honors

Awards
- FCS Central Region AD of the Year (2008 and 2012)

Forrest Gene Taylor (born July 22, 1957) is an American university sports administrator, currently serving as the athletic director at Kansas State University, serving since May 2017. Prior to his current position, Taylor served as the deputy athletics director at the University of Iowa from 2014 to 2017, and was the athletics director at North Dakota State University from 2001 to 2014.

== Career ==
=== Early career ===
Born in Safford, Arizona, Taylor graduated from Arizona State University in business in 1980 and completed his master's degree from St. Thomas University in 1985. After graduating from Arizona State, Taylor worked in restaurants while completing his master's degree. During the 1985–86 school year, Taylor served at Southern Methodist University working in the ticket office. For the next 15 years, Taylor would serve in various roles, including associate athletics director, at the United States Naval Academy from 1986 to 2001.

=== North Dakota State ===
In the summer of 2001, Taylor began his first full-time gig as an athletics director at North Dakota State. During his tenure at North Dakota State, Taylor more than tripled the department's budget, as well as helped the university transition from an NCAA Division II school to an NCAA Division I FCS school. Taylor also hired several successful coaches who have moved on to larger NCAA Division I schools: football coach Craig Bohl (2011–2013 FCS national champions) who was at Wyoming, from 2014 until Bohl’s retirement from coaching in 2023. And basketball coaches Tim Miles (now at San Jose State) and Saul Phillips (was at Northern State fired after 2025 season). Taylor left for the University of Iowa to become the deputy athletic director in 2014.

In 2008 and 2012, Taylor was awarded the FCS Central Region Athletic Director of the Year.

=== Kansas State ===
In April 2017, Taylor was hired as the new athletics director at Kansas State University, replacing John Currie. During his first year-and-a-half at K-State, Taylor unveiled a new master plan for the athletics department, as well hired Pete Hughes as the head baseball coach, and Chris Klieman as head football coach, replacing Bill Snyder. He currently serves on the College Football Playoff Selection committee.

== Personal life ==
Taylor is married to his wife, Cathy, and has two children.
