= Synerise =

Polish software development company

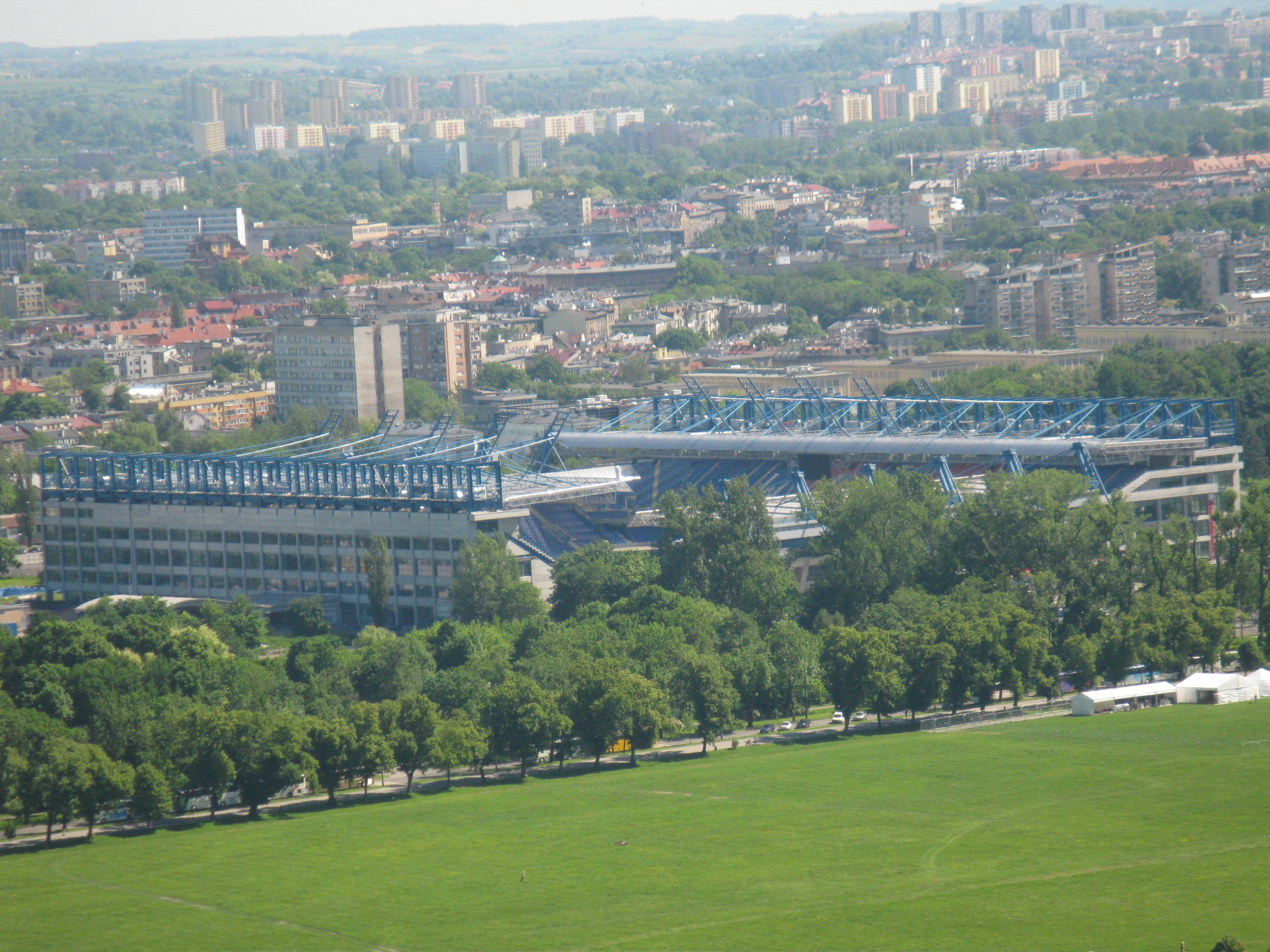
- Synerise Arena in Kraków, with Synerise main offices
- Formerly: HG Intelligence
- Type: Joint-stock company
- Industry: Software development; Business analytics; Business Intelligence; Big data; Artificial intelligence; Open source
- Founded: June 20, 2013; 13 years ago in Kraków, Poland
- Founder: Miłosz Baluś; Krzysztof Kochmański; Jarosław Królewski
- Headquarters: Reymonta 20, Kraków, Poland
- Number of locations: 1 office (2025)
- Area served: Worldwide
- Key people: Jarosław Królewski (CEO); Simon Hay (Executive Chairman); Miłosz Baluś (CTO); Krzysztof Kochmański (CDO); Jacek Dąbrowski (Chief AI Officer); Janusz Naklicki (CSO); Eugeniusz Licznarowski (CBDO)
- Products: Synerise Platform; TerrariumDB
- Brands: Cleora; BaseModel
- Services: BigData; AI; Automation
- Number of employees: ▲160 (2022)
- Website: synerise.com

Synerise (/ˈsɪnɛˌraɪz/) is a Polish software development company headquartered in Kraków, Poland. It develops and licenses its namesake enterprise-class data platform based on business intelligence systems and artificial intelligence that analyzes and interprets behavioral data, and automates business processes.

Synerise’s other proprietary solutions include an AI algorithm for recommendation and event prediction systems, a foundation model for behavioral data, and a column-and-row database management system.

The company also has an office in Warsaw. As of April 2024, the company’s value was estimated at US$120 million.

== History ==
=== Origins ===
In July 2012, Miłosz Baluś, Krzysztof Kochmański, and Jarosław Królewski, colleagues from an interactive agency Eskadra in Kraków, set up their own software house Humanoit Group. The company created project management systems, applications for managing educational units, online survey, and social research tools, as well as HoReCa industry managers.

Baluś, then a development director, is a geoinformatics graduate of the AGH University of Krakow. From 2007, he was a team leader, and later he managed the agency’s web-and-mobile branch. Kochmański is a graphic designer. Królewski, a UI/UX manager and front-end developer, and the president of the new company, is a sociologist, programmer, researcher, and lecturer at the AGH.

In 2013, Baluś, Kochmański, and Królewski were involved in creating an email marketing platform Freshmail. Humanoit Group focused on consumer insights.

=== Focus on big data and AI ===
On June 20, 2013, the Krakow Technology Park’s Seed Fund invested in Humanoit Group’s new business-intelligence and big data venture. A new company HG Intelligence was launched, with focus on a platform that supported and executed complex business operations of companies and corporations in their customer relationship management. In September 2013, HG Intelligence established its pivotal partnership with the footwear and fashion manufacturer Grupa Gino Rossi.

In February 2014, the two companies launched a first retail initiative in Poland based on Bluetooth Low Energy – a business analytics tool that merged big data with machine learning mechanisms to optimize sales and marketing. The multi-channel business intelligence platform called “Synerise,” combined with beacons and a mobile app, would enable analysis of consumer behavior, determine their needs through mobile payments, marketing automation, and strengthen customer loyalty. With the iBeacon technology and connection to PoS systems, it integrated online and offline consumer activity data.

=== Increase in value ===
In December 2015, Microsoft included HG Intelligence to its startup-support program BizSpark that included a grant for consuming the cloud-computing power of Microsoft Azure. By then, the investment fund Satus Venture joined the Kraków Technology Park’s Seed Fund as investor in HG Intelligence. On July 1, 2016, HG Intelligence formally renamed itself after its platform, as Synerise.

In September 2016, the company achieved a valuation of PLN 50 million (US$13.1 million), and raised capital in a private offering from angel investors to develop a new class of products, and introduce the platform to the segment of small and medium-sized enterprises. In January 2017, the Synerise platform became a fully commercial product, while being developed for the use in e-commerce, and to measure marketing effectiveness (in integration with DoubleClick).

In June 2017, Satus Venture’s minority shares in Synerise became subject of a transaction with a 29-fold return on investment, and Synerise was recapitalized with PLN 16.4 million. The issue was used for developing algorithms of autonomous processes. In 2018, the company invested PLN 25 million (US$6.6 million) in development of AI and automation solutions. In 2019, the company invested further PLN 35 million (US$9.3 million) on research and development of autonomous processes algorithms.

=== Expanding the presence ===
During its first four years, Synerise has been recognized as one of the fastest growing companies in Poland, it achieved a valuation of US$85M. Throughout 2018, a breakthrough year for the company, Synerise and its AI business solutions achieved a threefold increase in its user base. According to Forbes, Synerise has been "one of the most promising technology companies in Poland," while the company's CEO Królewski was named "a visionary computer scientist," and "one of the most promising young Polish businessmen in the tech industry."

As of January 2019, the company did not intend to tie up to an investor. It invested in intellectual property, new data storage systems, and expanding its AI specialty. In September 2018, for its “Chief Ideator,” the company enrolled economist Krzysztof Rybiński, former vice-president of the National Bank of Poland, and professor of data science at the Vistula University.

Synerise focused on AI and martech markets in the Americas, the Middle East, and APAC region including Malaysia and Singapore. As a technological partner of Microsoft, Synerise cooperated with its clients in Spain, Greece, and Vietnam. In February 2019, Synerise opened an office in Dubai. Since 2019, the company cooperates with Bank Pekao, as well as Ernst & Young, Bain & Company, and Integrated Solutions. In May 2019, the company opened an office in Madrid, starting implementations in Spain and Latin America.

In June 2019, Synerise joined European Institute of Innovation and Technology's seed accelerator program EIT Digital Accelerator. In February 2022, Synerise set a partnership with Ahmed bin Saeed Al Maktoum's Seed Group, to join a digital transformation of the United Arab Emirates. In May 2022, Synerise raised a $23 million funding round led by a technology investment fund Carpathian Partners. In December 2023, Simon Hay, formerly of Dunnhumby, was appointed as Synerise's executive chairman. On July 4, 2024, Synerise, announced the closing of a Series B+ funding round worth USD 8.5 million. The strategic investor was VTEX (listed on the NYSE), joined by a group of well-known business angels, including Marcin Żukowski (co-founder of Snowflake).

In November 2025, Synerise signed a €25 million venture debt agreement with the European Investment Bank under its 2025–2028 program TechEU, focused on developing next-generation AI-driven behavioral analysis technology.

== Software and services ==
=== Data collection and analysis ===
Synerise

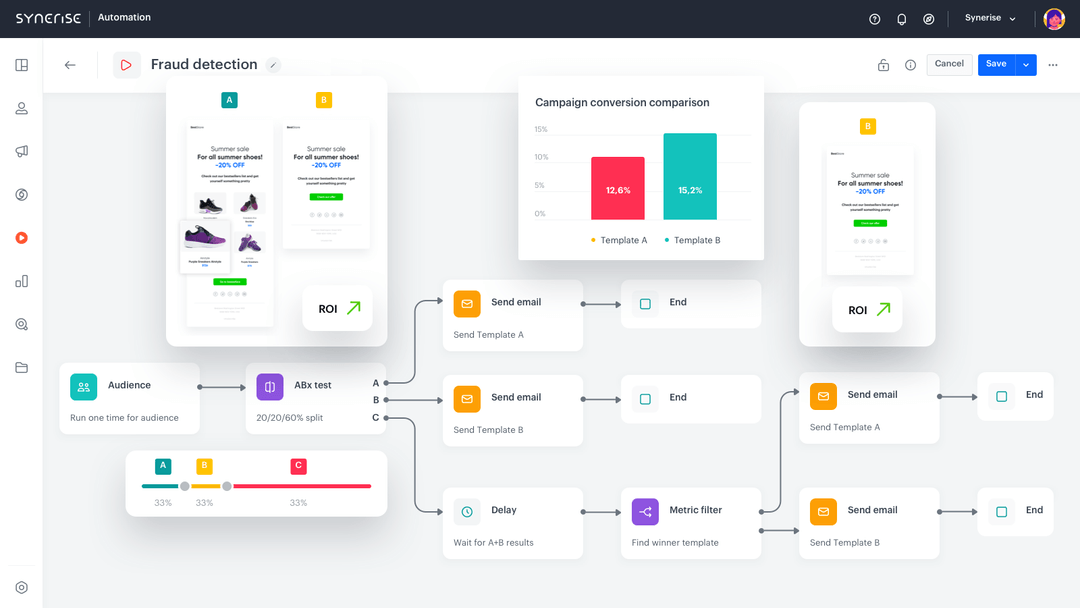
- Synerise platform interface
- Other names: Behavioral Data Platform
- Developer: Synerise
- Release: January 13, 2017; 9 years ago
- Stable release: 1
- Preview release: Beta / September 26, 2014; 12 years ago
- Engine: Customer data platform (proprietary)
- Operating system: Microsoft Windows; MacOS
- Platform: Microsoft Azure; Google Cloud Platform
- Type: Behavior-based robotics; Retail; Consumer Goods
- Website: synerise.com

Synerise’s platform AI Growth Cloud, developed at the end of 2015, is a business-intelligence ecosystem, enhanced by AI algorithms. It uses big data insights in business development, to help brands unify their data management, understand the behavior of customers, and better respond to their needs.

The platform monitors and analyzes all the consumer's experiences with a given brand: the frequency of visits to stores and purchases, as well as every instance of interest in a product. The platform is integrated with the brand owner’s websites, systems and social networking sites. Whereas, Wi-Fi sensors create maps of consumer shopping paths, by measuring the time a consumer spent in a given store, and at which shelves he stopped by the longest. The analysis also takes into account external factors including the dollar exchange rate, and weather conditions.

Next, the platform analyzes shopping activities of smartphone owners in real time, by examining the speed of reaction to sales messages, as well as predicting consumer behavior and estimating their wealth level.

=== Use in practice ===
The obtained data on consumer behavior constitute up-to-date assistance in management of sales, pricing strategy, and product segmentation. The analysis of the collected transactional and behavioral data allows for individual scoring and segmentation of consumers, as well as automation of marketing activities and creation of personalized loyalty programs. As a result, the platform’s tools increase sales effectiveness and generate new revenue or savings.

The platform's features are based on an AI-driven analysis combined with a semantic network, predictive analysis, machine learning, and marketing automation. For the needs of the platform, Synerise develops methods for processing large amounts of data on a global scale, with its own database engine in memory.

Synerise enables the integration of warehouse systems, product availability, loyalty programs and customer data from both systems to conduct marketing activities (email, SMS, proximity), as well as activity on websites and social media. It is also possible to create and develop loyalty programs that allow for effective transactions in stores by integrating with POS systems.

=== IT Infrastructure ===
The company develops proprietary AI technologies: data processing, a database system, and an open platform. As an all-in-one ecosystem, the Synerise platform processes billions of user data events in real-time, across multiple channels, which allows for the creation of personalized customer shopping paths, and comprehensive customer relationship management. Until June 2018, the Synerise platform had analyzed for its customers over 4 billion purchase transactions, with a value of almost 10 billion Euro per month, and it's capable of processing 100 thousands of simultaneous requests per second, for personalized content based on deep, dynamic segmentation all over the world. The company has in its systems transaction data and behavioral data on the subject of nearly 120 billion transactions, which corresponds to approximately 5 percent of Polish GDP.

Synerise created its own database from scratch. With a product called SDK, the Synerise platform can build a coherent ecosystem including a mobile application, built-in marketing automation tool, scoring system, loyalty program, and gamification mechanism—integrated with a PoS, registration, SSO, and e-commerce systems, with the ability to observe interactions and transactions in offline locations.

== Research & Development ==
In its own words, Synerise is “an engineering company, offensively introducing new products.” It focuses on the expansion in the field of intelligent systems. It cooperates with international corporations including retail, finance, telecommunications, and e-commerce, as well as research-and-development organizations.

The company began working on a project The Development of Inference Technology and Prediction of Consumer Behavior for Automation of Marketing and Sales Processes, implemented under the European Funds’ Regional Operational Program of the Lesser Poland Voivodeship for 2014-2020. The project aims to develop prototype enforcement, and analytical modules supported by machine learning and artificial intelligence, integrated with multichannel platforms.

In November 2020, Synerise open-sourced its AI algorithm Cleora, for recommendation and event prediction systems. In January 2023, the company introduced a behavioral-modeling AI platform BaseModel. The tool transforms raw data into behavioral profiles and makes personalized offers. It has been used in e-commerce, retail, hospitality, media, and banks, including BNP Paribas.

== Related initiatives ==
=== Partnerships with universities ===
Synerise cooperates with the AGH University of Krakow, the company co-finances new post-graduate business-and-technology studies in the field of internet marketing, along with digital economy studies. The programs were co-founded by Królewski.

In August 2018, Synerise in cooperation with the Poznań University of Economics and Business established doctoral studies in data science in business and administration, as part of the Implementation Doctorate program organized by the Polish Ministry of Science and Higher Education, the first such program in Poland for professionals working on AI solutions.

=== Wisła Kraków ===
Since 2019, Synerise has been the official sponsor of the Polish football club Wisła Kraków (Królewski is its president and co-owner). In addition to the flagship team, the company also supports the Wisła Academy and the women's section.

In 2026 it became the title sponsor of Henryk Reyman Municipal Stadium, entering a 3-year agreement totaling €780,000.

=== Other initiatives ===
In April 2015, HG Intelligence initiated a non-profit project BeaconValley.io, making the open beacons network available to programmers, local companies and public institutions in order to identify users' needs. The project’s hackathon was held in June 2015.

At Jarosław Królewski’s initiative, Synerise created a nationwide artificial intelligence teaching program AI Schools & Academy. Its sponsors included Microsoft, EY, PZU, Mediaexpert, CCC, Żabka, Bank Pekao, and Eobuwie. The initiative was inaugurated in December 2018, with an annual budget of PLN 6 million (US$1.6M). It consisted of regular lessons, tailored to the age of students, for kindergartens, as well as primary and secondary schools. In September 2019, they received access to open data courses and subsidies for supplementary classes.

In November 2018, Synerise joined the partners of the acceleration program Elektro ScaleUp, in which the Polish Agency for Enterprise Development supports startups working on innovations in the electromobility industry. Synerise representatives regularly participate in a public debate on the development of artificial intelligence and robotics in everyday life.

In August 2021, Synerise provided a platform for the Białystok Oncology Center to register patients for preventive breast tests.

=== Book publications ===
Królewski was the initiator and co-editor (with Paweł Sala) of the textbook E-Marketing. Contemporary Trends. Starter Pack, with its first edition co-written by 33 authors, released first in November 2013 by Wydawnictwo Naukowe PWN.

In May 2015, Marcin Zaremba, Synerise’s former chief product officer, published a textbook Mobile for managers, or how to create good mobile products ("Mobile dla menedżerów czyli jak tworzyć dobre produkty mobilne").

In May 2023, Królewski and Rybiński published a book Algocracy. How and why is artificial intelligence changing everything? ("Algokracja. Jak i dlaczego sztuczna inteligencja zmienia wszystko?", Wydawnictwo Naukowe PWN).

== Awards and accolades ==
In October 2017, Synerise was among ten showcasing companies in the “Startups in the Palace” presentations in the Presidential Palace in Warsaw.” In November 2017, Financial Times featured Baluś, Kochmański and Królewski in its “New Europe 100” list of “Eastern Europe’s brightest and best citizens who are changing the region’s societies, politics or business environments.”

External videos
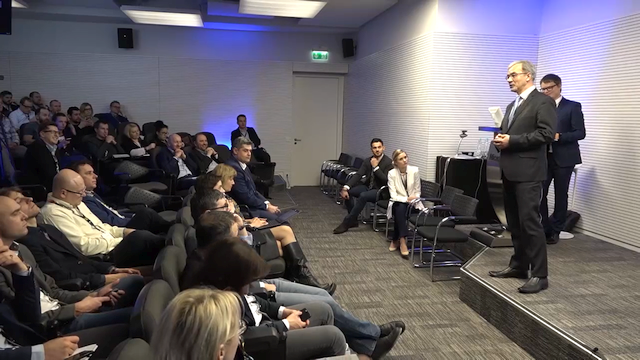
- Minister of Investment and Economic Development Jerzy Kwieciński at the Synerise launch in Warsaw, January 2017
- Synerise global launch conference
- Satya Nadella talks about Synerise
- Jarosław Królewski on Synerise
- Królewski awarded at the Ernst & Young Entrepreneur of the Year Award competition

In February 2018, Synerise’s CEO Jarosław Królewski was selected to Ernst & Young startup program EY Accelerating Entrepreneurs, among 30 technology entrepreneurs from all over the world, who represent dynamic businesses that focus on innovative and disruptive fields. In March 2018, Królewski was awarded the Special Jury Award as one of the Polish finalists of the Ernst & Young Entrepreneur of the Year Award competition, “for creating a technology company in which the founder has skilfully combined academic activity with entrepreneurship.”

In June 2018, Synerise was recognized by Microsoft for technology innovation, as one of global “Retail Partner of the Year” finalists. President of Microsoft Satya Nadella called Synerise a "next generation marketing cloud." In 2016 and 2017, Synerise was recognized by Microsoft as one of the largest Microsoft Azure key partners, with computing grants of over US$200,000. In November 2018, Królewski was among the "Innovation and Technology" winners of the “Digital Shapers” list of outstanding personalities of the Polish digital world and new technologies created by the foundation Digital Poland.

In March 2019, Synerise received the Economic Forum award, as the Polish ICT Company of the Year, "for the implementation of an innovative educational program based on AI." In June 2021, Synerise was third in the Association for Computing Machinery's International Knowledge Discovery and Data Mining Competition. In 2021 and 2022, the Deloitte included Synerise in its ranking Deloitte Technology Fast 50 Central Europe. Synerise was also a winner of the Twitter RecSys Challenge, Booking.com Data Challenge, and Rakuten Data Challenge.

In 2022 and 2023, Synerise was listed 70th in the Financial Times and Statista's ranking "FT 1000" of Europe’s fastest growing companies. In 2023, the Minister of Development and Technology, Waldemar Buda, awarded Synerise an honorary badge for contributions to the development of the economy of the Republic of Poland.
