= Jarosław Królewski =

Polish entrepreneur, programmer, and sociologist

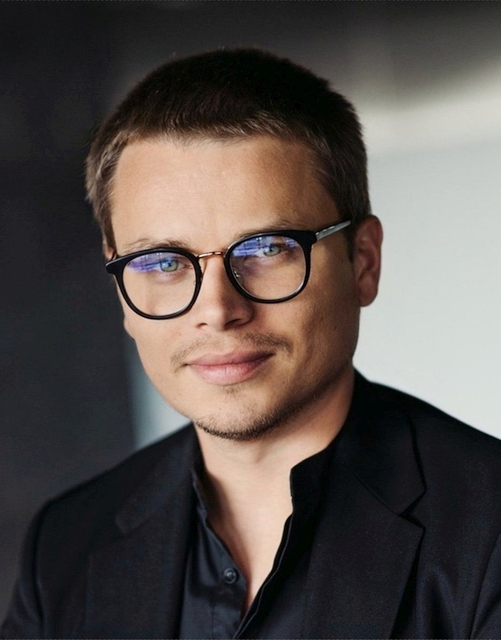
- Jarosław Królewski in 2022
- Born: September 26, 1986 (age 40); Gorlice, Poland
- Citizenship: Polish
- Education: AGH University of Krakow; University of Management and Banking in Krakow
- Occupations: programmer; sociologist; lecturer
- Height: 182 cm (6 ft 0 in)
- Title: CEO of Synerise; CEO of Wisła Kraków; Scientist of AGH University of Krakow
- Honours: World Economic Forum; Young Global Leader 2025
- Website: jaroslawkrolewski.com

Jarosław Królewski ([jaˈrɔswaf kruˈlɛfskʲi]; born September 26, 1986) is a Polish entrepreneur, programmer, sociologist, investor, and philanthropist from Hańczowa, Poland. He is a researcher and lecturer at the AGH University of Krakow. He was selected as a Young Global Leader by the World Economic Forum in 2025. Królewski is a cofounder and chief executive of the software development company Synerise - behavioral Artificial intelligence infrastructure. He is also the president and a majority stakeholder of the Polish soccer club Wisła Kraków. He has served as an advisor to the Prime Minister of Poland - Donald Tusk (Future Council) and to the President of Poland (Business Council) - Karol Nawrocki since 2026.

== Biography ==
=== Scientific activities ===
Królewski graduated from the AGH University of Kraków and the University of Banking and Management in Kraków. He completed two fields of study: a master's degree in sociology, and an engineer's degree in computer science. He co-created innovative study programs, including social informatics and electronic business, recognized as the most innovative field of study in Poland in 2012 by the Ministry of Science and Higher Education, which led to the AGH receiving a PLN 1 million award for the development of the program.

Królewski is a research and teaching employee at AGH, where since 2010 he has been conducting classes and lectures on the Internet, mobile technologies, and UX/UI. He has been preparing a PhD thesis. He is the brand ambassador of the Academy. He is also a mentor of the Polish Development Fund network. In 2019, on the occasion of the AGH University's 100th anniversary, Królewski was honored the title of "AGH Graduate Junior 2018."

Królewski is the co-originator of the "Data Science in Business and Administration" doctoral studies organized by the Faculty of Computer Science and Electronic Economy of the Poznań University of Economics.

He is a co-author of a book E-marketing. Contemporary trends. Starter package (2013), and an Book on algorithmic governance Algocracy. How and why artificial intelligence changes everything (with Krzysztof Rybiński, 2023).

=== Business career ===
Throughout the 2000s, Królewski was responsible for issues of usability and user experience at the advertising agency Eskadra in Kraków. In 2012, along with programmer Miłosz Baluś and graphic designer Krzysztof Kochmański, he founded the software house Humanoit Group. The company created a project management software using machine learning and artificial intelligence.

In 2013, HG Intelligence was established to create a platform for analytics and automation of business processes called "Synerise" that combined big data with artificial intelligence mechanisms. Królewski became the president of the company's management board. In 2016, the company rebranded itself after its own platform. It is one of the fastest growing enterprises in Poland – in 2019 it was valued at USD 85 million (PLN 323.5 million), and its value is still growing, in 2022 it announced an investment of USD 23 million. Królewski is a supporter of releasing some software in open-source form, an example of which is the open library Cleora.ai.

Królewski has been described "one of the most promising young Polish businessmen in the technology industry." According to Forbes, he is a "visionary computer scientist who in many respects resembles the young Bill Gates." Królewski considers himself a “technological determinist and optimist.” He never wants to be a millionaire or billionaire, he spends 80 percent of his private income on education, sports and charities.

=== Sports ===
In his youth (2002–2006) he was a football player of the (then 4th-league) club Glinik Gorlice, and represented it at the then-highest level of junior competitions in Poland. He played there with Rafał Wisłocki, later president of Wisła Kraków and vice-president of Bruk-Bet Termalica Nieciecza.

In early 2019, Królewski was the initiator of a rescue operation that saved Wisła Kraków from bankruptcy, as well as the originator of the crowdfunding issue of shares of Wisła Kraków, pioneering in Polish sports, during restructuring and searching for a strategic investor. The offered shares constituted 5.1 percent. all the company's shares, which meant that the club was valued at PLN 74.4 million. 40,000 shares were put up for sale, each worth PLN 100. Within 24 hours, they were purchased by 9,124 investors through an equity crowdfunding platform Beesfund, earning the club PLN 4 million.

In March 2019, Królewski became vice-chairman of Wisła's supervisory board, a position he held until 2021. In April 2020, he became Wisła's co-owner, along with the footballer Jakub Błaszczykowski, and Tomasz Jażdżyński, president of Gremi Media (publisher of the news outlets Rzeczpospolita and Parkiet). The three granted a bridging loan to the club of PLN 4 million, each supporting PLN 1.33 million. The funds were used to repay the club's debts to players.

In November 2022, the supervisory board of Wisła Kraków appointed Królewski as the president of the club's management board. In December 2022, Królewski took over a majority stake in the club. In January 2024, based on match statistics, he used AI tools to select Wisła's new coach, Albert Rudé.

=== Social activities ===
Królewski is the creator and originator of the nationwide educational project "AI Schools & Academy", the first artificial intelligence teaching program in Polish kindergartens, primary and secondary schools in Polish history. Launched in 2018, the project was financed by Synerise business partners: Carrefour, CCC, Ernst & Young, IDC, Media Expert, Microsoft, Orange Foundation, Oriflame, Bank Pekao, Photon, PZU, and Żabka. Physicists, mathematicians, and computer scientists conduct special classes in 1,500 kindergartens, primary and secondary schools. Outstanding students and teachers are awarded scholarships. The project was appreciated by experts.

In the years 2018–2020, Królewski was the main sponsor of Glinik Gorlice. He also supported the women's football team Staszkówka Jelna (of Staszkówka).

After taking over the shares of Wisła Kraków in 2020, he launched socially conscience initiatives along with other shareholders, including a women's football team, the amp football section, and the blind football section. He has privately sponsored social charities.

== Accolades and awards ==
The following is a list of awards and honours received by Królewski.

Year	Award / honour	Awarding body / notes
2026	I liga (Betclic) — champions	As president/owner of Wisła Kraków; promotion to the Ekstraklasa
2026	Member, Council of the Future (Rada Przyszłości, Prime Minister of Poland)	Appointed by PM Donald Tusk, 10 February 2026
2026	Member, Business Council (Rada Biznesu, President of Poland)	Appointed by President Karol Nawrocki, 25 March 2026
2025	World Economic Forum — Young Global Leader	Only Polish honoree in the 2025 cohort
2025	Leader of the Year — Data Economy Congress (Data Economy Innovation Awards, Spring 2025)	
2025	SAR/KTR Innovation 2025 — Bronze (Data Analytics, commercial), "The AI Chosen One"	TS Wisła Kraków (client), VML (lead)
2025	Polish Super Cup — runner-up	2024 Polish Super Cup, played 2 April 2025; Wisła Kraków lost 0–1 to Jagiellonia Białystok
2024	Polish Cup — winner	As president/owner of Wisła Kraków
2023	BrandMe CEO	6th edition; recognised for innovative business and combining science with technology
2019	"Absolwent AGH" (AGH Graduate Award)	AGH University
2019	Poland AI Person of the Year (AI Awards)	
2018	EY — Top 30 most promising tech entrepreneurs worldwide (EY Accelerating Entrepreneurs)	
2018	EY Entrepreneur of the Year (Poland) — Special Jury Award	For combining science with entrepreneurship
2018	Digital Shapers	Digital Poland Foundation
2017	"New Europe 100" — eastern Europe's emerging innovators	Google, Res Publica and the Financial Times; jointly with Synerise co-founders Baluś and Kochmański

== Private life ==
Królewski comes from a Lemko family from Hańczowa in the Low Beskids. He is married to Aleksandra Królewska.

== Bibliography ==
- Jarosław Królewski, Paweł Sala, E-marketing. Współczesne trendy. Pakiet startowy, Wydawnictwo Naukowe PWN, 2023 ISBN 9788301215156
- Jarosław Królewski, Krzysztof Rybiński, Algokracja. Jak i dlaczego sztuczna inteligencja zmienia wszystko?, Dom Wydawniczy PWN, 2023 ISBN 9788301228750
- Jarosław Królewski, Szymon Łukasik, Mateusz Smęt, Generating Textual Descriptions for Recommendation Results using Fuzzy Linguistic Summaries, Institute of Electrical and Electronics Engineers ISBN 978-1-5090-6020-7
- Jarosław Królewski, Entrepreneurship in startups: the social implications of the Internet revolution in small and medium-sized enterprises, ESA 2013: Crisis, critique and change: Torino, 28–31 August 2013: abstract book / European Sociological Association (ESA), University of Torino. Department of Culture, Politics and Society. – [Torino: University of Torino] ISBN 978-88-97523-49-9
- Królewski, Jarosław (2014). "Recenzja książki - Maszyny społeczne: wszystko ujdzie, o ile działa - Autorzy Łukasz Aftelowicz, Krzysztof Pietrowicz - Opublikowany 2013 Polskie Wydawnictwo Naukowe PWN" [Book review - Social machines: anything goes, as long as it works - Authors Łukasz Aftelowicz, Krzysztof Pietrowicz - Published 2013 Polish Scientific Publishers PWN] (PDF). Kultura i Edukacja (Culture and Education) (in Polish) (6). Adam Marszałek Publishing House: 243–246. ISSN 1230-266X.
- Potencjał Internetu i jego (nie)wykorzystanie w kontekście potrzeb osób niepełnosprawnych – [The potential of the Internet and its (non)use in the context of the needs of people with disabilities] / Jarosław Królewski, Tomasz Masłyk, Ewa Migaczewska, Maria Stojkow, Dorota Żuchowska // W: Polscy niepełnosprawni: od kompleksowej diagnozy do nowego modelu polityki społecznej / pod red. Barbary Gąciarz, Seweryna Rudnickiego. – Kraków: Wydawnictwa AGH, 2014. – (Wydawnictwa Naukowe / Akademia Górniczo-Hutnicza im. Stanisława Staszica w Krakowie; KU 0555), ISBN 978-83-7464-701-4
- Przyszłość Łemków w Polsce – szanse i zagrożenia w subiektywnej wizji przedstawicieli społeczności łemkowskiej – The future of Lemkos in Poland – opportunities and threats in the subjective vision of the Lemkos community representatives / Jarosław Królewski // Studia Humanistyczne AGH = Contributions to Humanities AGH, ISSN 2084-3364
- The Poles in the Scottish labor market: the influence of culture of organization on the psychosocial conditioning of work attitude / Jarosław Królewski // W: Economy in changing society: consumptions, markets, organizations and social policies / ed. Maria Nawojczyk. – Newcastle upon Tyne: Cambridge Scholars Publishing, 2011, ISBN 978-1-4438-2699-0
- Using Big Data in innovation research – Używanie Big Data w badaniach nad innowacjami / Maria Nawojczyk, Jarosław Królewski // Zagadnienia Naukoznawstwa; ISSN 0044-16192016 t. 52 z. 4, s. 431–449.
