= Kansas State Wildcats =

Intercollegiate sports teams of Kansas State University

- University: Kansas State University
- Nickname: Wildcats
- NCAA: Division I (FBS)
- Conference: Big 12
- Athletic director: Gene Taylor
- Location: Manhattan, Kansas
- Varsity teams: 16
- Football stadium: Bill Snyder Family Stadium
- Basketball arena: Bramlage Coliseum
- Baseball stadium: Tointon Family Stadium
- Soccer stadium: Buser Family Park
- Golf course: Colbert Hills
- Colors: Royal purple and white
- Mascot: Willie the Wildcat
- Fight song: Wildcat Victory
- Website: kstatesports.com

The Kansas State Wildcats (variously "Kansas State", "K-State", or "KSU") are the intercollegiate athletic teams that represent Kansas State University. The official color of the teams is Royal Purple; white and silver are generally used as complementary colors.

Kansas State participates in the NCAA Division I FBS (Football Bowl Subdivision) and is a member of the Big 12 Conference since 1996. Previously, Kansas State competed in the Kansas Collegiate Athletic Conference until 1912; the Big Eight Conference from 1913 to 1928; and the Big Eight Conference from 1928 to 1996 (known as the Big Six from 1928 to 1947 and the Big Seven from 1947 to 1957).

== Athletics Department overview ==
Kansas State offers fourteen sports at a varsity level. As of May 2018, Kansas State has won more than 80 conference championships through the years, not counting titles captured in the old Kansas Intercollegiate Athletic Association (see chart below). Kansas State has not won any team NCAA championships, but has several individual national champions.

The Kansas State athletic department is one of a limited number in the United States, and the only one in Kansas, that operates with no monetary contribution from the broader academic institution. The most recent change in athletic teams offered at Kansas State occurred when the school began a women's soccer program in the fall of 2016, and discontinued women's equestrian at the conclusion of the 2015–16 season.

=== History ===
Athletic competition began within the first decade after the founding of Kansas State Agricultural College in 1863, as students began organizing and playing games of baseball against locals from Manhattan. Beginning in 1890, a baseball game between the faculty and the senior class became an annual feature of graduation day.

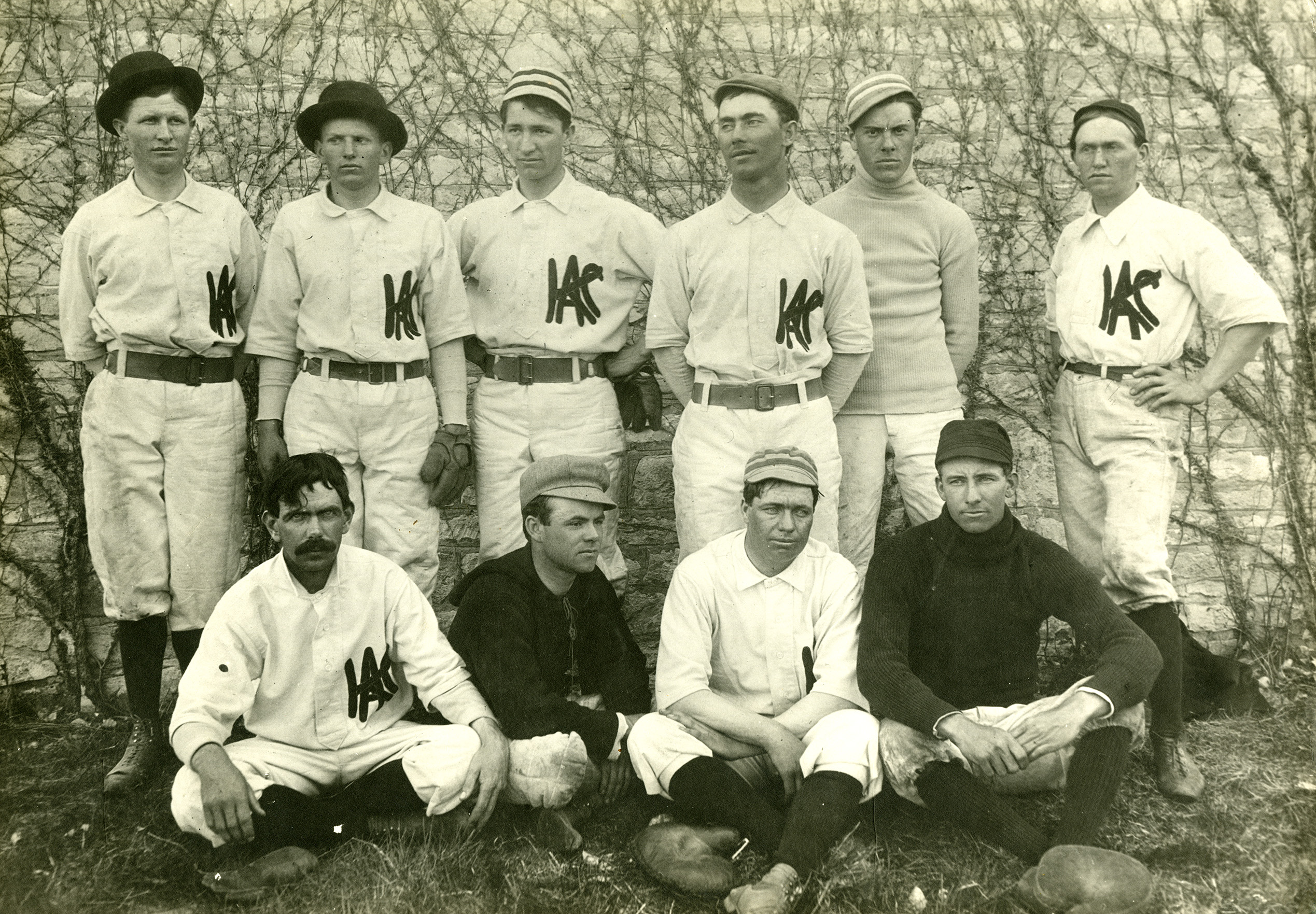
Kansas State baseball team, 1897

According to most sources, intercollegiate competition began on Thanksgiving Day 1893, when Kansas State's football team defeated St. Mary's College 18–10. A baseball match against St. Mary's College followed on May 26, 1894. (St. Mary's was a regional athletics powerhouse, whose recent graduates included baseball pioneers Charles Comiskey and Ted Sullivan.) These matches are not, however, reflected in the school's official histories, and the first official contest recorded is a 14–0 loss to Fort Riley in a football game on November 28, 1896.

By the turn of the century, Kansas State was competing in the Kansas Intercollegiate Athletic Association, along with the University of Kansas and other state schools. Adopting a more organized approach to athletics, in 1911 an "athletic committee" was created at the school to set policy and schedule contests, among other duties. On the heels of athletic success in the Kansas conference, including a 1912 football championship, Kansas State was invited to join the more prestigious Missouri Valley Intercollegiate Athletic Association (MVIAA) in 1913. In 1916 head football and basketball coach Zora Clevenger was elected the school's first official Athletic Director. Clevenger was assisted in that role by former football star Germany Schulz. In 1928, when the "Big Six" members of the MVIAA split away from the smaller schools of the Missouri Valley, Kansas State was included in its membership.

The school's commitment to athletics dipped thereafter. According to longtime Wildcat radio announcer Dev Nelson, after World War II Kansas State was one of the few major schools that didn't make a significant investment in its football program, or athletics overall. Indeed, for many years the Wildcats spent far less on athletics than any other Big Eight school. Between 1969 and 1975 the school added women's programs, but also cut four men's sports: men's swimming, wrestling, men's gymnastics and men's tennis. As recently as 1987–1988 the University of Oklahoma (the Big Eight's second smallest school) spent $12.5 million on athletics while Kansas State spent only $5.5 million. In more recent decades, however, the school has recommitted significant resources to athletics, and in 2012 it was the most profitable athletics department in the United States.

In 2012–2013, Kansas State became the second Big 12 school to win conference titles in football, men's basketball, and baseball in the same school year. In the 2007–2008 school year, Kansas State was the only school in the nation to have a consensus All-America in both football (Jordy Nelson) and men's basketball (Michael Beasley).

=== Administration ===
Athletics at Kansas State University are administered by the University's Department of Intercollegiate Athletics. The department is headed by the Athletic Director.

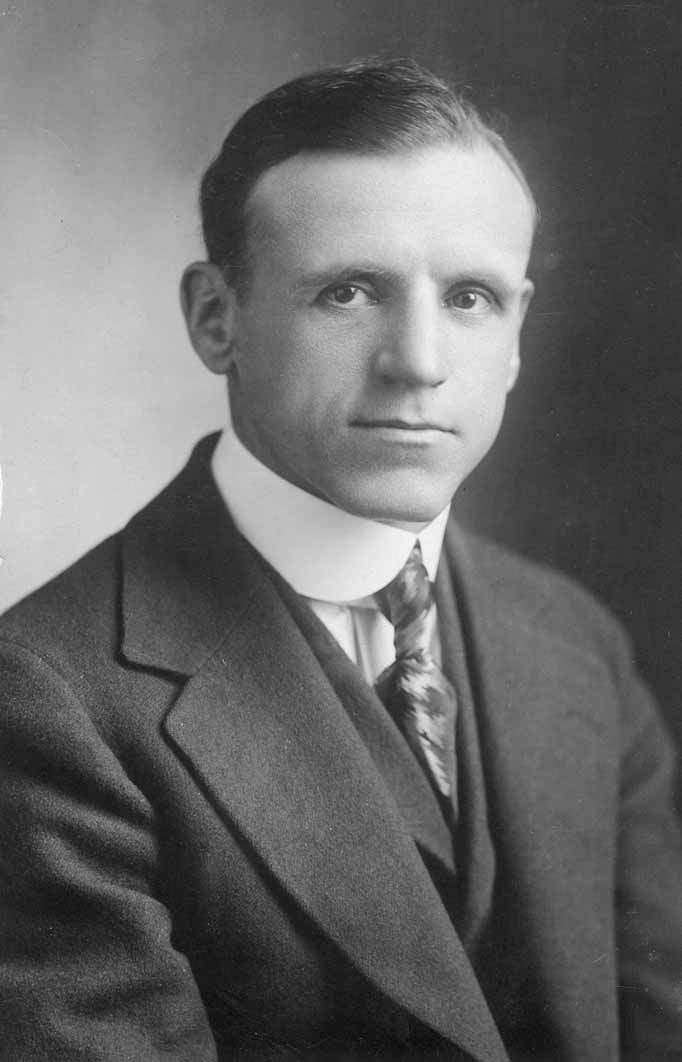
Zora Clevenger, first Athletic Director at KSU

Director	Years	Notes
Zora Clevenger	1916–1920	First athletic director, member of College Football Hall of Fame
Mike Ahearn	1920–1947	Considered "Father of Kansas State Athletics"
Thurlo McCrady	1947–1950	
Larry Mullins	1951–1955	
Bebe Lee	1956–1968	Member of National Association of Collegiate Directors of Athletics Hall of Fame
Ernie Barrett	1969–1975	Known as "Mr. K-State"
Johny "Jersey" Jermier	1976–1977	
DeLoss Dodds	1978–1981	Resigned to become athletic director at the University of Texas at Austin
Dick Towers	1981–1985	
Larry Travis	1985–1988	
Steve Miller	1988–1991	Hired Bill Snyder as football coach in December 1988
Milt Richards	1991–1993	
Max Urick	1993–2001	
Tim Weiser	2001–2008	Resigned from K-State to become the Big 12's deputy commissioner
Bob Krause	2008–2009	
John Currie	2009–2017	
Laird Veatch	March–April 2017	Interim
Gene Taylor	2017–current	

=== Conference membership history ===
Big 12 logo in K-State's colors

- 1899–1913: Kansas Intercollegiate Athletic Association
- 1913–1927: Missouri Valley Intercollegiate Athletic Association
- 1928–1947: Big 6 Conference
- 1948–1957: Big 7 Conference
- 1958–1995: Big 8 Conference
- 1996–present: Big 12 Conference

Note: Two women's sports historically competed in other conferences when those sports were not sponsored by KSU's primary conference. Women's basketball competed in the "Kansas State Conference" for regular-season titles before the Big 8 began sponsoring a regular-season competition in 1982–1983, and women's rowing competed in Conference USA from 2010 through 2014.

== Sports sponsored ==
Men's sports	Women's sports
Baseball	Basketball
Basketball	Cross country
Cross country	Golf
Football	Rowing
Golf	Soccer
Track and field^{†}	Tennis
	Track and field^{†}
	Volleyball
† – Track and field includes both indoor and outdoor.

=== Baseball ===
The Wildcats call Tointon Family Stadium home. The team's head coach is Pete Hughes.

Kansas State's baseball team officially began play in 1897. The Wildcats earned one of the school's first varsity championship in 1907 under coach Mike Ahearn. The Wildcats went on to win a Missouri Valley Conference championship in 1928, and Big Six Conference championships in 1930 and 1933. The school's most recent championship was the Big 12 Conference regular season championship in 2013. Kansas State's best finish at the Big 12 Conference baseball tournament is a runner-up finish in the 2008 tournament.

The Wildcats have traditionally not been competitive on a national scale, but in 2009 the team made its first appearance in the NCAA tournament, and it has returned three times since. Former coach Brad Hill's teams also earned the school's first national rankings in the USA Today/ESPN Coach's Poll in the 2009 and 2010 seasons.

Other milestones in the team's history include Earl Woods, the father of golfer Tiger Woods, becoming the first African-American baseball player in the Big Seven Conference in 1952, as well as all-time coaching wins leader Mike Clark winning the Big Eight Coach of the Year award in 1990.

=== Basketball ===
The men's and women's basketball teams play their home games in Bramlage Coliseum, nicknamed the "Octagon of Doom".

==== Men's basketball ====
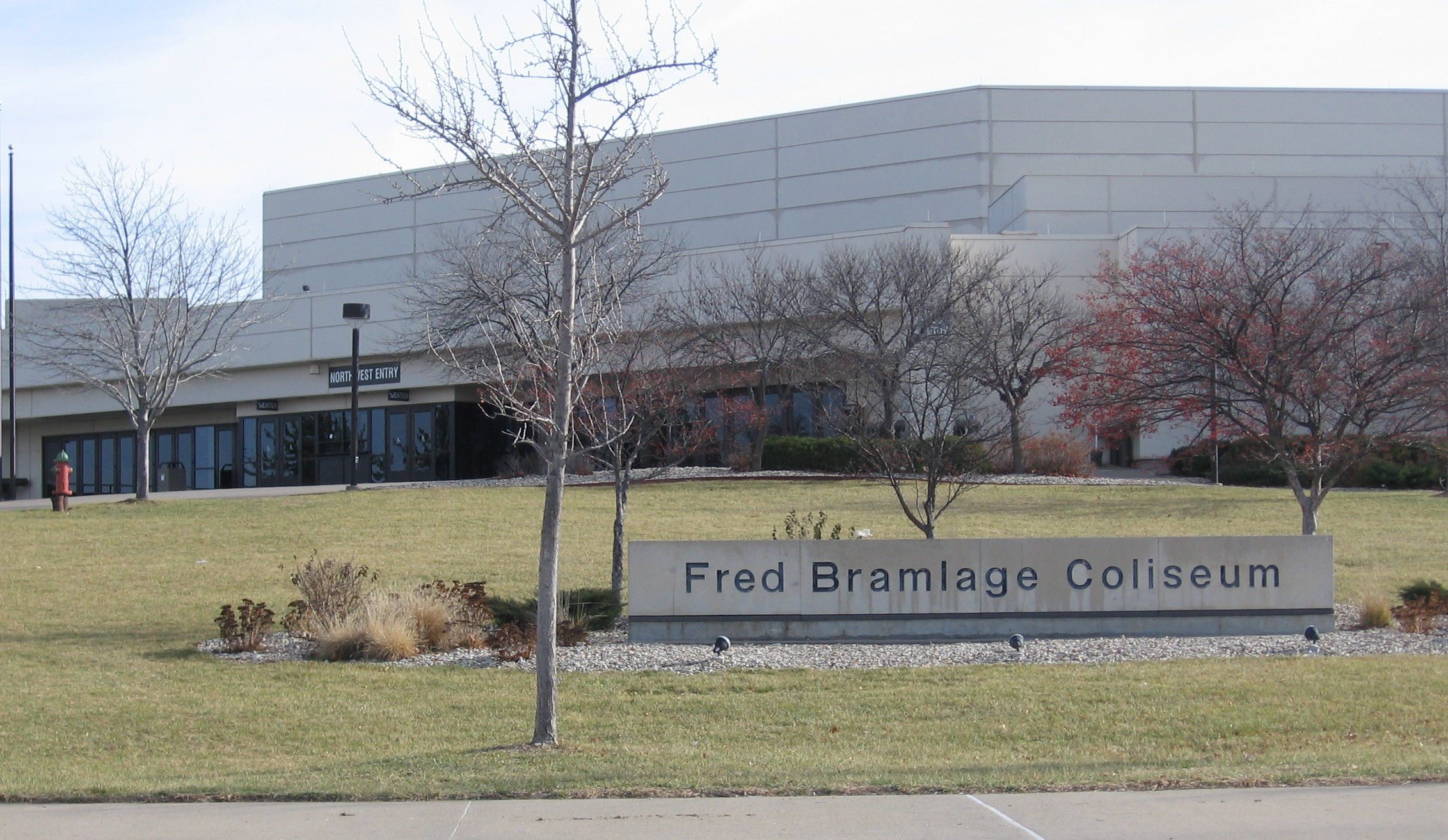
Bramlage Coliseum, basketball venue

Kansas State's men's basketball team began competition in 1902. The program has a long history of success. The first two major conference titles captured by the school were won in the sport, in 1917 and 1919, in the Missouri Valley Conference. Kansas State has gone on to capture 19 major conference crowns in the sport. The program has also appeared in 31 NCAA basketball tournaments. Kansas State lost to the University of Kentucky for the national championship in 1951, and has reached the Final Four four times, the Elite Eight 13 times, and the Sweet Sixteen 17 times. K-State has finished ranked in the top ten of the AP Poll or Coaches Poll on nine occasions (most recently in 2010), and in the final top 25 polls 21 total times. When Street & Smith's Annual listed the 100 greatest college basketball programs of all time in 2005, K-State ranked 22nd.

After a lengthy period with little success during the 1990s and 2000s, Kansas State returned to winning under head coaches Frank Martin (2007–2012) and Bruce Weber (2012–present). Following a twelve-year absence, the team was invited to the 2008 NCAA tournament, and has now appeared in the tournament 9 of the past 12 seasons. Highlights during this era include winning two Big 12 regular-season conference championships (2012–13 and 2018–19), and freshman Michael Beasley being named an All-American and Big 12 Conference Player of the Year in 2008. The 2009–10 team spent much of the year ranked in the Top 10 of the national polls and finished second in the Big 12. That team went on to advance to the Elite Eight of the 2010 NCAA tournament, a feat the program repeated in 2018 and 2023.

On March 21, 2022, KSU athletic director Gene Taylor announced that Baylor associate head coach Jerome Tang had been named the new head men's basketball coach for the Wildcats, starting with the 2022–23 season.

The current men's basketball coach is Casey Alexander.

==== Women's basketball ====
Kansas State's women's basketball team began intercollegiate competition in 1968. The team is among the top 15 all-time winningest programs in the NCAA.

The women's team has participated in 21 total NCAA basketball tournaments and AIAW tournaments (pre-NCAA), the second-most appearances in the Big 12 Conference. K-State has finished ranked in the Top 25 of the AP Poll twelve times, including three rankings in the Top 10 (1984, 2003, 2004). Following the 2005–2006 season, Kansas State was crowned champion of the Women's National Invitation Tournament.

The current head coach is Jeff Mittie.

=== Football ===
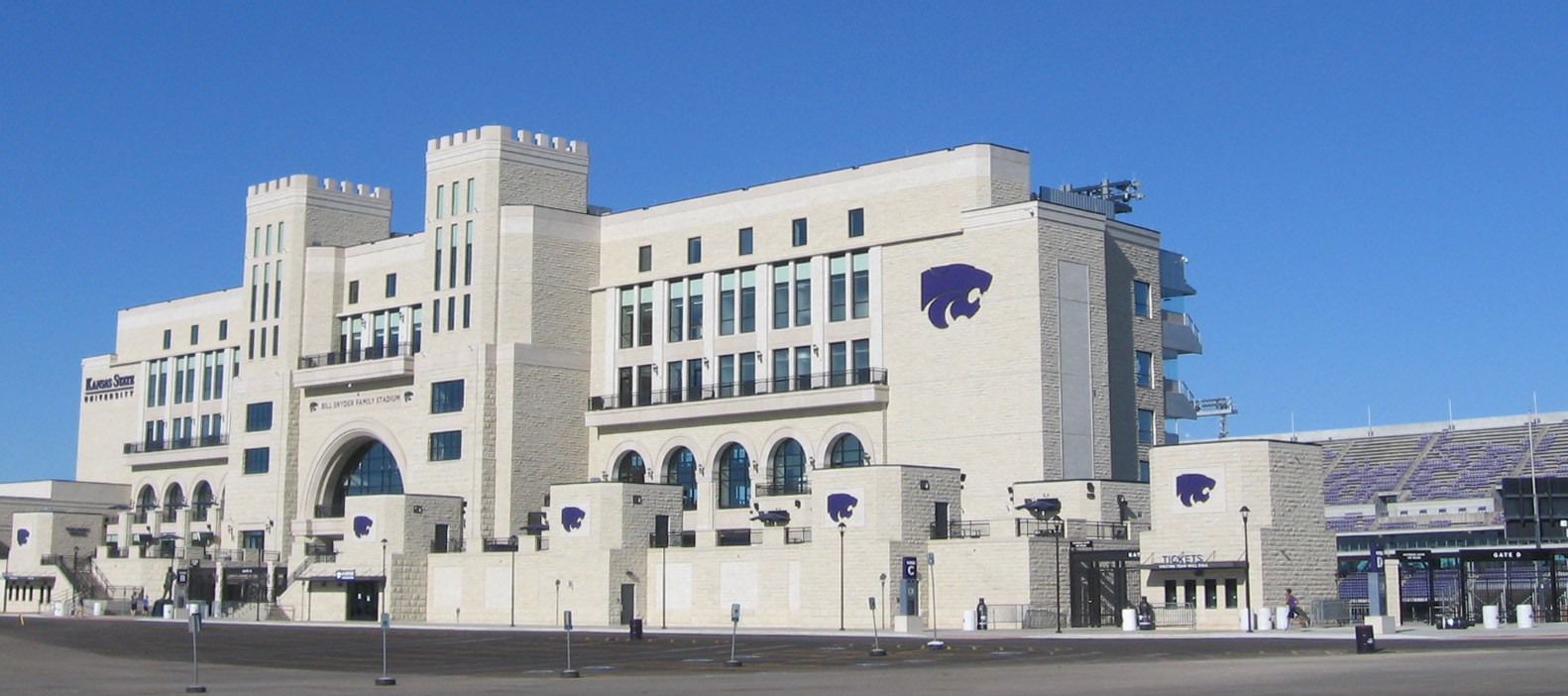
Bill Snyder Family Football Stadium

Kansas State's football team officially began play in 1896 with a 14–0 loss to Fort Riley on November 28, 1896. The program had some shining moments in the 1920s and 1930s, but by 1989 the school was statistically the worst program in NCAA Division I with a record of 299–509–41.

Fortunes changed when Bill Snyder was hired as head coach in 1989. Success and high rankings followed, highlighted by a #1 national ranking during the 1998 season, a #1 BCS ranking in the 2012 season, and Big 12 Conference championships in 2003 and 2012. Between the years of 1993 and 2003, Snyder's teams went 109–29–1 and attended eleven straight bowl games. Additionally, from 1995 to 2001 the school appeared in the AP Poll for 108 consecutive weeks—the 15th-longest streak in college football history.

The team plays its home games at Bill Snyder Family Stadium, and the KSU Marching Band (also known as the Pride of Wildcat Land) performs at all home games, selected away games and all bowl games.

The current coach is Collin Klein, who succeeded Chris Klieman upon his retirement at the conclusion of the 2025 season. Through five seasons, Klieman has a record of 48-28. Klieman announced his retirement from coaching December 3, 2025 at Kansas State facilities in Manhattan.

=== Track and field ===
Kansas State began competing in track and field in 1904. The team has won 23 major conference championships. Its athletes have also achieved considerable national success.

Through the end of the 2015–2016 season, K-State athletes have won individual NCAA national championships 37 times. Twenty-four Kansas State athletes have attended 15 Olympic Games, most recently at the 2016 Summer Olympics, and have won eight medals.

The head coach of the program from 1992 until the summer of 2024 was Cliff Rovelto. Rovelto has won a number of coach of the year awards during his tenure at Kansas State, including 2015 Big 12 Coach of the Year for women's indoor track and field. He also served as head coach for the U.S. Track & Field team at the 2011 Pan American Games, and as an assistant coach for the U.S. team at a number of other competitions including the 2016 Summer Olympics and the 2005 World Championships in Athletics in Helsinki.

On August 2, 2024, Kansas State athletics announced that Travis Geopfert, who had a long tenure at the Arkansas Razorbacks, is the new KSU track and field/cross country director. Immediately, Geopfert hired several assistant coaches including Tara Davis-Woodhall who won the gold medal in the women's long jump at the 2024 Paris Olympics with a leap of 7.10 metres (23-3.50). Geopfert was her coach at the Olympics in Paris as well as seven other Olympians.

Former coach Ward Haylett, who is enshrined in the National Track & Field Hall of Fame, left a strong imprint on the Kansas State program. Haylett was head coach at the school from 1928 to 1963.

=== Volleyball ===
The team currently plays in Morgan Family Arena, north of the main campus adjacent to the football stadium and basketball arena.

Kansas State's women's volleyball team began intercollegiate competition in 1974. The team is among the all-time winningest programs in the NCAA.

As of the close of the 2017 season, the team has participated in 17 NCAA tournaments, including ten consecutive tournaments from 1996 to 2005. K-State also participated in the AIAW tournament in 1977. K-State has finished ranked in the final top twenty of the AVCA poll six times, and in the top 25 on eleven occasions. The team most recently participated in the NCAA tournament in 2016.

The current head coach is Jason Mansfielf, hired in January 2023, replacing Susie Fritz.

Fritz had led the Wildcats to several NCAA tournament appearances and the school's first conference title in volleyball in 2003. As of the close of the 2008 season, Fritz also holds the second-highest winning percentage among all K-State's volleyball coaches after compiling a record of 148–70 (.679). In eight seasons as head coach, through the end of the 2008 season, Fritz has coached six All-Americans.

=== Notable non varsity sports ===
==== Rugby ====
Kansas State rugby plays in the Heart of America conference against traditional rivals from the Big 12 north such as Kansas and Missouri. The Wildcats previously played college rugby in the Central Division, where they were champions in the 2009–10 and 2010–11 seasons. In the 2010–11 season Kansas State reached the sweet 16 round of the national playoffs and finished the season ranked 8th. The Wildcats best season was in 1981, when they reached the national semifinals.

== Rivalries ==
=== Kansas Jayhawks (Sunflower Showdown) ===
The first recorded meeting between Kansas State and KU in athletic competition was a baseball game in 1898. Since the early 20th century, when the schools began regularly competing in baseball, basketball, and football, the two teams schools and fans have developed a passionate rivalry.

Men's basketball

The rivalry on the hardwood peaked in the 1950s when both teams were national title contenders. A facilities race also began in the 1950s, starting with the construction of Kansas State's Ahearn Fieldhouse, which was one of the largest basketball facilities in the country with a capacity of 14,000 when opened in 1951. Kansas soon answered with Allen Fieldhouse, which would seat 16,300. The rivalry continued strong through the 1980s, but faded as Kansas began a 24-game win streak against the Wildcats in Manhattan in 1984. On January 30, 2008 #22 Kansas State upset #2 Kansas 84–75, winning against Kansas in Bramlage Coliseum for the first time with the aid of freshmen Michael Beasley and Bill Walker. Kansas State trails in the all-time series, 94-203.

Football

Historically, neither football program has had sustained success. The rivalry intensified for a period in the early 1990s as both teams entered the national rankings. In 1991 Head Coach Bill Snyder gained his first win against the Jayhawks and over the next 12 years Kansas would only beat the Wildcats once, in 1992, until KU finally won again in a home game in 2004. The rivalry intensified again in the 2000s as Kansas returned to relevance under Mark Mangino and the Wildcats struggled under Ron Prince.

The Wildcats have won the last 17 meetings in the series, ten under Snyder during his second tenure (2009–18) and seven under Chris Klieman.

Since 1969, the two teams have competed for the Governor's Cup. Kansas State leads during the Governor's Cup era 31–19–1, but trails in the all-time series, 54–64–5.

=== Nebraska Cornhuskers ===
Football

After the creation of the Big 12 Conference in 1996, through the early 2000s, the Wildcats and Cornhuskers consistently competed for the Big 12 North championship. Before the 1990s, however, the series was severely one-sided, with Kansas State losing 29 consecutive games to Nebraska until November 14, 1998 when the #1-ranked Wildcats beat #11 Nebraska 40–30. Kansas State subsequently beat Nebraska in 2000, 2002, 2003 and 2004. Nebraska still leads the series 78-15-2.

Volleyball

Nebraska was the Wildcats' biggest volleyball rival before leaving for the Big Ten Conference in 2011. Both teams were ranked in the AVCA Top 25 almost weekly during the Big 12 era, and Kansas State home games against Nebraska were promoted with T-shirts that read "Keep The Red Out."

== Civil rights pioneer ==
=== Sexual orientation ===
In July 2017, Kansas State football player Scott Frantz announced to ESPN that he is gay. When the Wildcats opened their season on September 2, 2017, Frantz became the first openly gay college football player to play at the NCAA's highest level.

=== Racial integration ===
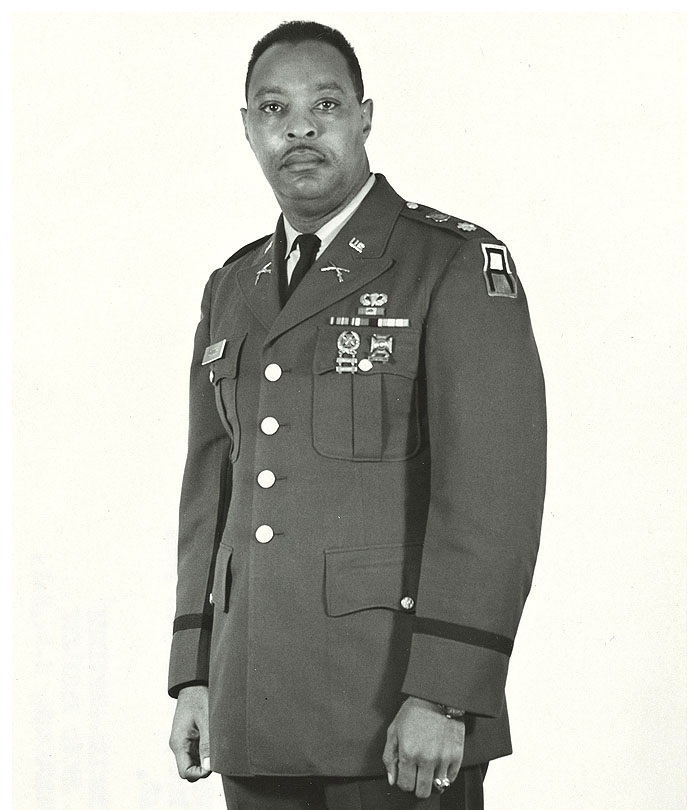
Earl Woods was one of the KSU athletes to break down conference race barriers

Kansas State historically has been welcoming to all races. The university has been open to enrollment by African Americans since its founding in 1863, and as far back as the 1940s and 1950s (a time noted by many for its lack of civil rights in the United States), the leadership of K-State athletics took a strong stance in support of racial integration on its athletic teams.

==== Football ====
In 1949, African American Harold Robinson played football for Kansas State with an athletic scholarship. In doing so, Robinson broke the decades-long "color barrier" in Big Seven Conference athletics, and became the first ever African-American athlete on scholarship in the conference. Harold Robinson later received a letter of congratulations from Jackie Robinson, who had integrated major league baseball in 1947 while playing with the Brooklyn Dodgers.

==== Baseball ====
In the spring of 1951, the conference color barrier in baseball was broken by Kansas State's Earl Woods (the father of golf great Tiger Woods). An indicator of the controversial nature of this position is reflected in an article published in The Tulsa World about an incident that occurred in the early 1950s during a baseball game:

Former teammate Larry Hartshorn recalled an instance when the Wildcats were scheduled to play a spring game against a team from Mississippi. During warm-ups, the Mississippi coach took notice of Earl, and according to Hartshorn, the coach said his team would play the game only if the black player stayed on the bus. Instead, K-State coach Ray Wauthier put everybody on the bus. "We just left", Hartshorn said.

==== Men's basketball ====
In the winter of 1951–1952, Kansas State's Gene Wilson broke the conference color barrier in basketball, together with LaVannes Squires at the University of Kansas.

== Championships ==
The Wildcats have won 68 regular-season conference championships and 13 conference tournaments, with the men’s basketball program claiming the most of any sport. Kansas State, along with Virginia Tech and UCF, (Note: UCF claims a 2017 football championship awarded by Colley Matrix. However, this championship is not widely recognized and was not bestowed by the NCAA.) is one of only three Power Five conference schools that have never won a team national championship in an NCAA sanctioned sport. The Wildcats also won 3 divisional titles in football when the Big 12 had divisions from 1996 to 2010.

Major conference regular-season championships (1913–present)*
Sport	Titles	Year(s)
Football	4	1934; 2003; 2012; 2022
Men's basketball	18	1917; 1919; 1948; 1950; 1951; 1956; 1958; 1959; 1960; 1961; 1963; 1964; 1968; 1970; 1972; 1973; 1977; 2013; 2019
Women's basketball	13	1972; 1973; 1974; 1975; 1976; 1977; 1978; 1979; 1983; 1984; 1987; 2004; 2008
Baseball	4	1928; 1930; 1933; 2013
Women's volleyball	1	2003
Cross country, men	13	1924; 1925; 1932; 1933; 1934; 1936; 1937; 1938; 1939; 1965; 1966; 1971; 1975
Cross country, women	3	1982; 1992; 1998
Indoor track and field, men	3	1935; 1974; 1976
Indoor track and field, women	1	1976
Outdoor track and field, men	1	1919
Outdoor track and field, women	4	2001; 2002; 2017; 2018
Wrestling (discontinued)	3	1931; 1939; 1940
Boxing (discontinued)	1	1926
Total	68	

Major conference tournament championships (1913–present)*
Sport	Titles	Years
Women's basketball	4	1976; 1977; 1984; 1987
Men's basketball	9	1947; 1950; 1952; 1958; 1960; 1961; 1963; 1977; 1980
Total	13	

* Not counting titles earned in the Kansas Intercollegiate Athletic Association, through the 1912–13 school year. Kansas State captured at least ten championships in the old Kansas Conference, in track (1906, 1908, 1909), baseball (1907, 1908), football (1909, 1910, 1912), and basketball (1910, 1913).
