= European Humanities University =

Private university in Vilnius, Lithuania

- Lithuanian: Europos humanitarinis universitetas Belarusian: Еўрапейскі гуманітарны ўніверсітэт
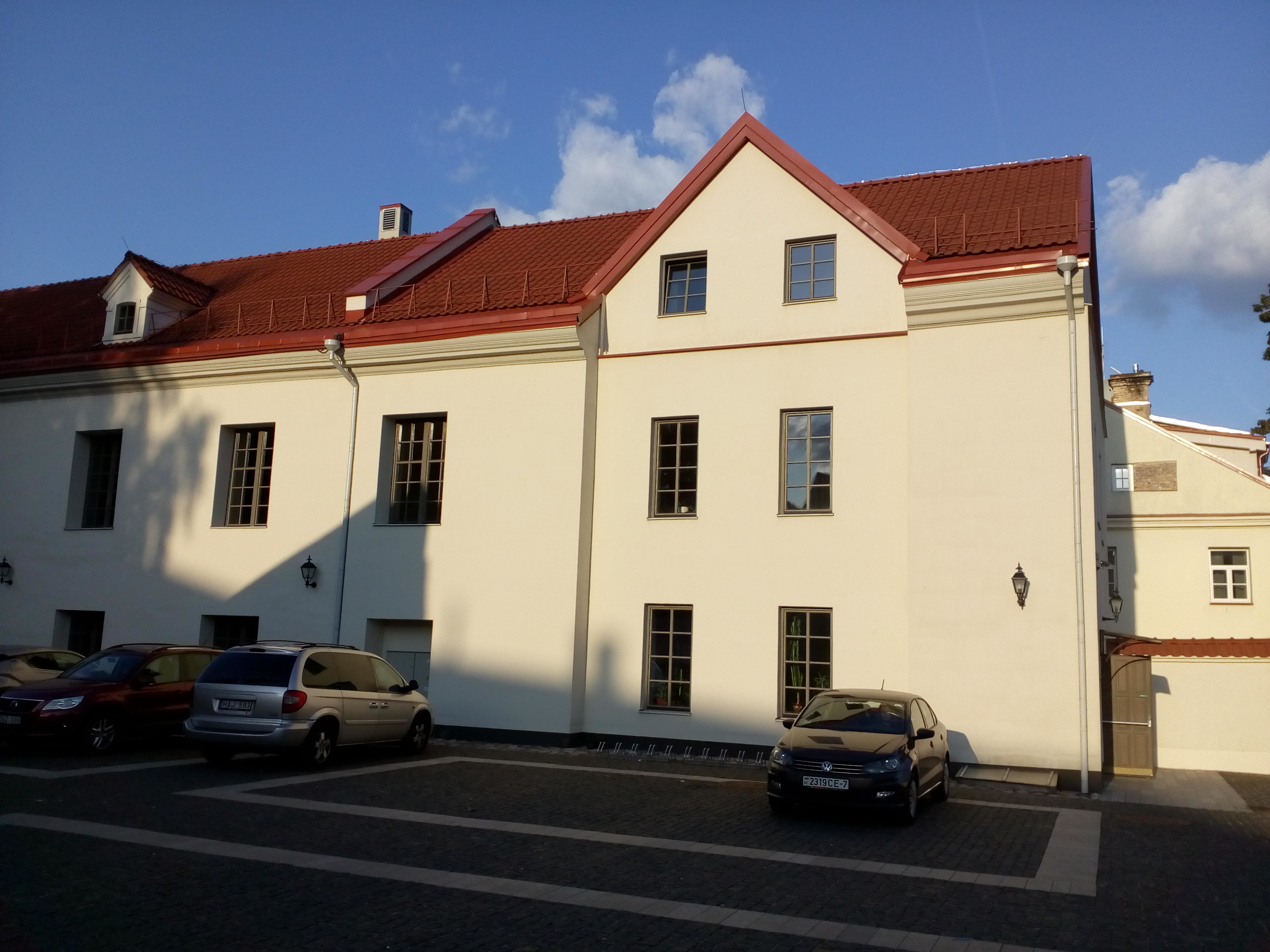
- Type: Private, liberal arts university
- Established: 1992; 34 years ago
- Affiliations: EUA, IAU, EAIE, SAR, AUF, EUF-CE, Open Society University Network
- President: Prof. Anatoli Mikhailov
- Rector: Dr. Vilius Šadauskas
- Academic staff: ~87
- Administrative staff: ~50
- Students: 680
- Undergraduates: 630
- Postgraduates: 50
- Doctoral students: 2
- Location: Vilnius, Lithuania; 54°40′57″N 25°17′14″E
- Campus: Urban
- Website: en.ehu.lt

European Humanities University (Belarusian: Еўрапейскі Гуманітарны Ўніверсітэт, romanized: Jeŭrapiejski Humanitarny Ŭniviersitet (ЕГУ/EHU), Lithuanian: Europos humanitarinis universitetas (EHU), Russian: Европейский гуманитарный университет, romanized: Evropeyskiy gumanitarnyy universitet (ЕГУ/EGU)) is a private, non-profit liberal arts university founded in Minsk, Belarus, in 1992. Following its forced closure by the Belarusian authorities in 2004, EHU relocated to Vilnius (Lithuania) and thus continues its operations as a private university.

EHU offers high-residence and low-residence undergraduate, graduate and postgraduate degree programs in the field of humanities and social sciences. The university has been headquartered in Vilnius, Lithuania, since authorities expelled it from Belarus in 2004. The university intends to return to Minsk.

From 1992 to 2004 EHU was a non-state establishment of undergraduate and post-graduate education in Belarus. In 2004, due to government opposition, EHU was forced to terminate its activities in Belarus. However, thanks to political, administrative, and financial support from the European Union, the Nordic Council of Ministers, the Governments of Lithuania, other European countries, and the United States, NGOs and foundations like MacArthur Foundation, Carnegie Corporation of New York, and others, EHU resumed its operation in Vilnius, Lithuania and opened bachelor's and master's degree programs for Belarusian students in autumn 2005. In March 2006 the Government of Lithuania granted EHU the official status of a Lithuanian university.

After the mass protests of the Belarusian presidential election of 2010, many EHU students and teachers were imprisoned by the KDB. The university said it would work with students to help them in their education despite the circumstances.

In academic year 2020/21 EHU serves around 680 mostly Belarusian students, offering undergraduate and graduate degree programs and promoting research in the humanities and social sciences. About two-thirds of EHU's students attend via online programs and reside in Belarus. About one-third attend courses on campus in Vilnius. Most of the courses are taught in either Belarusian or Russian, though some courses are taught in English, German and French. EHU ranks second among private universities in Lithuania.

It is a member of the European Colleges of Liberal Arts and Sciences.

== History ==
=== Minsk period (1992–2004) ===
The university was established in Minsk in 1992. At that time it comprised eight schools and provided education with 13 programs in humanities, foreign and classical languages, and IT. EHU was a basis for the establishment of research centers and institutes in Belarus: the Institute of German Studies, the Center for Economic and Social Research, the center for Gender Studies, the center for Civic Education, the Information and Resource Center on the European Integration and others.

In 2002 it was one of the first universities to join European University Foundation - Campus Europae.

On July 24, 2004, the Ministry of Education of the Republic of Belarus revoked university's license for the provision of educational services, claiming the campus was unsuitable for classes. The university was forced to terminate its operations. The actions of the authorities provoked a mass protest next day; about two hundred students and faculty defended their right to study and work in EHU.

=== Vilnius period (since 2004) ===
In 2005 EHU reestablished its activity in Lithuania with the support of the Government of Lithuania, European Commission, the Nordic Council of Ministers, and support by European countries and international foundations.

On March 10, 2006, EHU was granted the status of a private Lithuanian university. The first EHU undergraduate class in Vilnius completed its studies in 2009.

On June 5, 2012, EHU celebrated its 20th anniversary in Vilnius Town Hall.

On June 14, 2013, EHU was awarded an Atlantic Council Freedom Award for unwavering commitment to democracy in Belarus by providing Belarusian students with a free and democratic environment to pursue their education.

In 2014 EHU completed faculty reform, which aimed at providing better working conditions for faculty and to strengthening the overall quality of education and research at the university. In 2015 EHU announced the results of an international rector's search, which involved 19 candidates from seven countries. On April 3 Prof. G. David Pollick (US) was appointed as Rector. In the same year university Senate endorsed Magna Charta Universitatum. In summer 2016 Prof. G. David Pollick resigned from the university's Rector position following an audit by Deloitte that revealed him to be the beneficiary of a potentially fraudulent reimbursement scheme.

Starting October 3, 2016 Jørgen Jørgensen (Denmark) served as University's Acting Rector.

In academic year 2016/17 EHU started implementation of the brand new liberal arts-inspired Core Curriculum, which was designed with an assistance of the Bard College network.

On March 1, 2018, former Minister of Education of Bulgaria Professor Sergei Ignatov was appointed rector.

Starting from May 3, 2018, EHU Campus is located in the former Augustinian monastery of the UNESCO World Heritage-listed Vilnius Old Town.

During the AY 2020/21 Opening Ceremony, former president candidate and leader of the Belarusian opposition Sviatlana Tsikhanouskaya made a keynote address to EHU students.

On April 3, 2023, Professor Krzysztof Rybiński became Rector of the university.

On January 6, 2025, Dr. Vilius Šadauskas began his term as Rector.

In 2025, Belarusian authorities added EHU's website and social networks to the list of extremist materials, and the Prosecutor General's Office of Belarus demanded that the university be designated as an extremist organization. There were also reports of pressure on EHU students by the KGB and the Investigative Committee of Belarus. The Supreme Court of Belarus designated the university as an extremist organization in April 2026. In September 2026, Amnesty International condemned Belarusian authorities' searches and interrogations of over sixty people affiliated with the EHU and their families living in Belarus.

== Academics ==
Operating in Lithuania, EHU is involved in the Bologna process and conducts the academic process according to the standards of the European Higher Education Area. Upon successful completion of degree studies at EHU, university graduates are awarded European Union-recognized diplomas.

The university's academic year begins on October 1.

Academic departments:

- Department of Humanities and Arts
- Department of Social Sciences

EHU offers following high-residence and low-residence undergraduate programs:

- Visual Design
- European Heritage
- Media and Communication
- World Politics and Economics (joint degree programme with Vytautas Magnus University in Kaunas, Lithuania)
- International Law and European Union Law (LL.M> degree program)

Master's programs in blended learning mode:

- Cultural Heritage Development
- Public Policy
- Visual Plastic Art

Since 2011, EHU offers a Doctorate in Philosophy jointly with Vytautas Magnus University and the Lithuanian Culture Research Institute.

EHU offers low residence programs and courses via Moodle. Upon completion of distance courses free listeners are awarded with an ECTS.

High-residence students are also eligible to participate in Erasmus+ and Campus Europae student mobility programs with more than 50 partner universities throughout Europe. EHU provides tuition fee waivers for Belarusian students on the basis of academic merits and thanks to the support of the university donors. Additionally there are stipends available for Belarusian undergraduate high-residence students at the ratio 1 stipend per 10 students.

== Research ==
EHU conducts research in humanities and social sciences and supports the research activities of its faculty and students by maintaining research centers, laboratories, and institutes:

- Center for Constitutionalism and Human Rights
- Center for Gender Studies
- Center for German Studies
- Laboratory of Critical Urbanism
- Laboratory of Visual and Cultural Studies

EHU research centers conduct research activities, organize scientific conferences, publish scientific journals (Journal of Constitutionalism and Human Rights, Journal of philosophical and cultural studies).

== Funding ==
After its relocation to Lithuania, EHU relied on financial support from foreign governments, European institutions and private foundations. The Nordic Council of Ministers, which had been one of the university's major donors after the move to Vilnius, announced in 2016 that it would end its funding for EHU, citing budget restructuring, a review of the university's role and strategy, and internal divisions at the institution.

In 2022, the EHU Multi-Donor Trust Fund was established to consolidate and administer donor support for the university. The fund is managed by Lithuania's Central Project Management Agency (CPMA), which also manages the EU4Belarus support project for EHU. The project, with a budget of €4 million for 2021–2025, was designed to support the university's development, quality assurance, research and outreach activities.

== Leadership ==
=== General Assembly of Part-Owners ===
The General Assembly of Part-Owners is the highest governing body of the university that brings together organizations that reestablished EHU in Lithuania after its closure in Minsk. These include the Eastern Europe Studies Centre (Lithuania), Open Society Foundations (USA) and Eurasia Foundation (USA).

=== Governing Board ===
The Governing Board is responsible for the strategic direction, finances, and functioning of the university. Starting January 6, 2020 the new membership of the Governing Board has been appointed for the 3-years term. The composition of the Governing Board:

- Chair Andrius Kubilius (Lithuania), Member of the European Parliament, Former Prime Minister of Lithuania
- Vice-chair Megaklis Petmezas (Greece), Vice Principal for Communication, Marketing and Student Recruitment at the International Faculty, City College, University of Sheffield (Main Campus in Thessaloniki)
- Dr. Jonathan Fanton (USA), President Emeritus of the American Academy of Arts and Sciences
- Mindaugas Kačerauskis (Lithuania), deputy director at the Development Cooperation Department, Ministry of Foreign Affairs of Lithuania
- Reinhard Stuth (Germany), former Minister for Culture and Media at Hamburg State Government
- Prof. Krzysztof Rybiński, ex officio (Poland), Rector of the European Humanities University
- Prof. Anatoli Mikhailov, ex officio (Belarus), President of the European Humanities University

=== President ===
Prof. Anatoli Mikhailov is a scholar in the field of German philosophy, who founded EHU in Minsk in 1992 and served as Rector until September 30, 2014. Starting October 2014 Prof. Mikhailov serves as EHU President.

=== Rector ===
On April 3, 2023, the General Assembly of Part-Owners appointed Professor Krzysztof Rybiński to be the Rector of EHU. A scholar with a Ph.D. in economics from the University of Warsaw, Professor Rybinski is a seasoned academic administrator with more than 20 years of management experience, including three years as Rector of Narxoz University in Almaty, Kazakhstan and five years as Rector of Vistula University in Warsaw, Poland.

=== Senate ===
The Senate is a collegiate academic consulting body, operating on the parity representation basis of the two academic departments of the university. According to the Statutes, the Senate is responsible for assessing the quality of studies, research and art activities. Chair of the Senate is Prof. Aliaksandr Puptsau.

=== Students' Union ===
Students' Union is an autonomous student self-government body, operating as a legal entity, which represents EHU students internally and externally, as according to the Law on Higher Education and Science of the Republic of Lithuania. EHU Students' Union is a full member of the Lithuanian National Union of Students.

== People ==
=== Doctor Honoris Causa ===
EHU's Doctor Honoris Causa degree is conferred upon scholars, statesmen, public, religious, and political figures of the Republic of Belarus and other countries to honor their accomplishments in humanities and social sciences, university education and culture; their contributions to the development of democracy and the realization of the principles of the rule of law; and their contribution to the development of culture and promotion of intercultural dialog.

EHU Honorary Doctors are:

- Aleś Razanaŭ, Belarusian poet and translator.
- Fr. Alexander Nadson (1926–2015), Apostolic Visitor for Belarusian Greek-Catholic faithful abroad and a Belarusian émigré social and religious leader.
- Dr. Jonathan Fanton, President Emeritus of the American Academy of Arts and Sciences
- Dr. Hans Gert Poettering, former President of the European Parliament
- Prof. Andrea Riccardi, an Italian researcher of Church history, professor of Contemporary History, Roma Tre University, Italy.
- Stéphane Hessel, French diplomat, public figure, writer.
- Olga Sedakova, Russian poet, translator and scholar of Christian culture.
- Prof. Alfred Grosser, French educational and cultural figure, head of academic programs.
- Prof. Krzysztof Zanussi, Polish film director and public figure, president of the Federation of European Film Directors.
- Prof. Sergey Averintsev (1927–2004), Russian researcher in culture and classical philology.
- Prof. Algirdas Brazauskas (1932–2010), President (1993–1998) and Prime Minister (2001–2006) of the Republic of Lithuania.

== See also ==
- European University at Saint Petersburg
