= Jian Pei =

Canadian computer scientist

Jian Pei FRSC
- Education: Simon Fraser University (PhD); SJTU (M. Eng, B. Eng)
- Scientific career
- Fields: Data Mining
- Workplaces: Duke University; Simon Fraser University; SUNY Buffalo
- Doctoral advisor: Jiawei Han
- Notable students: Daxin Jiang; Hossein Maserrat; Moonjung Cho

Jian Pei is the Arthur S. Pearse Distinguished Professor of Computer Science at Duke University. Previously a professor at Simon Fraser University in Burnaby, British Columbia and SUNY Buffalo. He was named a Fellow of the Institute of Electrical and Electronics Engineers (IEEE) in 2014 for his contributions to data mining and knowledge discovery. Pei received his PhD at SFU advised by Jiawei Han, and bachelor degree at SJTU.

He teaches Data Science at Duke.
