= Data event =

A data event is a relevant state transition defined in an event schema. Typically, event schemata are described by pre- and post condition for a single or a set of data items. In contrast to ECA (Event condition action), which considers an event to be a signal, the data event not only refers to the change (signal), but describes specific state transitions, which are referred to in ECA as conditions.

Considering data events as relevant data item state transitions allows defining complex event-reaction schemata for a database. Defining data event schemata for relational databases is limited to attribute and instance events. Object-oriented databases also support collection properties, which allows defining changes in collections as data events, too.
