= Max Urick =

American football coach and college athletics administrator (1940–2025)

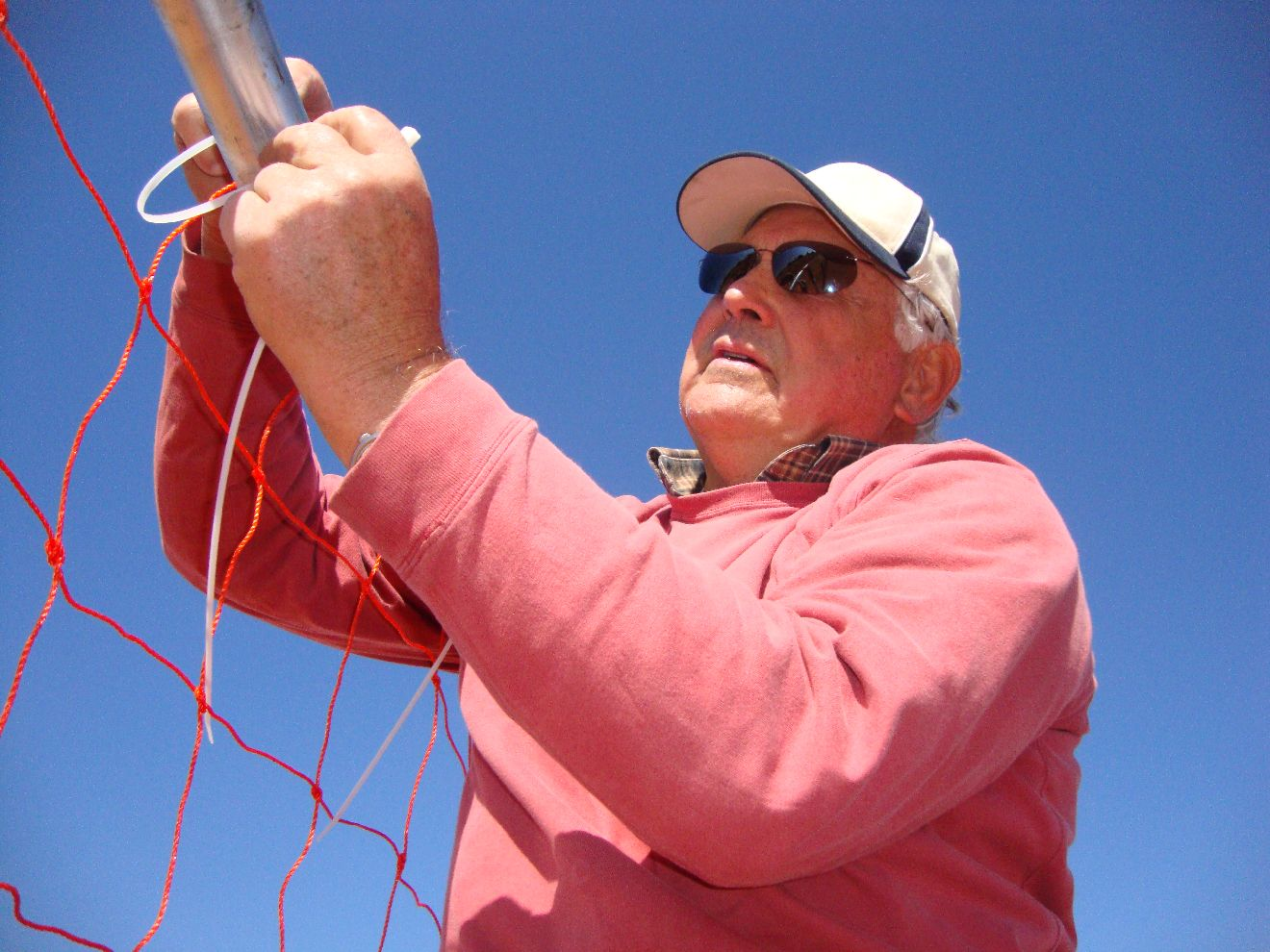
- Urick in 2011

Biographical details
- Born: January 30, 1939; Troy, Ohio, U.S.
- Died: November 21, 2025 (aged 86); Manhattan, Kansas, U.S.

Playing career
- 1957–1960: Ohio Wesleyan
- Positions: Center, linebacker

Coaching career (HC unless noted)
- 1963–1966: Ohio State (backfield)
- 1967–1970: Wabash
- 1971–1973: Duke (backfield)

Administrative career (AD unless noted)
- 1974–1983: Iowa State (asst. AD)
- 1983–1993: Iowa State
- 1993–2001: Kansas State

Head coaching record
- Overall: 11–22–2

Max Franklin Urick (January 30, 1939 – November 21, 2025) was American football coach and college athletics administrator. He served as the head football coach at Wabash College in Crawfordsville, Indiana for four seasons, from 1967 until 1970, compiling a record of 11–22–2. Urick was the athletic director at Iowa State University from 1983 to 1993 at Kansas State University from 1993 until his retirement in 2001. Urick died at his home in Manhattan, Kansas, on November 21, 2025, at the age of 85.

== Head coaching record ==
Year	Team	Overall	Conference	Standing	Bowl/playoffs
Wabash Little Giants (NCAA College Division independent) (1967–1970)
1967	Wabash	2–7			
1968	Wabash	3–6			
1969	Wabash	3–6			
1970	Wabash	3–3–2			
Wabash:		11–22–2			
Total:		11–22–2			
