= Jiawei Han =

Chinese-American computer scientist (born 1949)

Jiawei Han FRSC
- Born: August 10, 1949 (age 77); Shanghai, China
- Education: University of Wisconsin - Madison (PhD); University of Science and Technology of China (BSc.)
- Scientific career
- Fields: Data Mining
- Workplaces: University of Illinois at Urbana-Champaign; Simon Fraser University
- Doctoral advisor: Larry Travis
- Doctoral students: Jing Gao; Jian Pei; Osmar R. Zaiane

Jiawei Han FRSC (Chinese: 韩家炜; born August 10, 1949) is a Chinese-American computer scientist and writer. He currently holds the position of Michael Aiken Chair Professor in the Department of Computer Science at the University of Illinois at Urbana-Champaign. His research focuses on data mining, text mining, database systems, information networks, data mining from spatiotemporal data, Web data, and social/information network data.

== Biography ==
Born in Shanghai on 10 August 1949, Han received his BS from University of Science and Technology of China in 1979 and earned his PhD from the University of Wisconsin-Madison in Computer Science in 1985.

Currently he is a professor at the Department of Computer Science in the University of Illinois at Urbana-Champaign, where he teaches courses on Data Mining, Text Mining, and Information Networks. Han served as the Director of Information Network Academic Research Center (INARC) supported by Network Science Collaborative Technology Alliance (NSCTA) program of U.S. Army Research Lab (ARL) from 2009 to 2016, and the co-director of KnowEng, a BD2k (Big Data to Knowledge) research center funded by NIH in 2014–2019.

Han has chaired or served on over 100 program committees of international conferences and workshops, including PC co-chair of the Second International Conference on Knowledge Discovery and Data Mining (KDD 1996), 2005 (IEEE), International Conference on Data Mining (ICDM), Americas Coordinator of 2006 International Conference on Very Large Data Bases (VLDB). He also served as the founding Editor-In-Chief of ACM Transactions on Knowledge Discovery from Data.

He is an ACM Fellow and an IEEE Fellow. He received the 2004 ACM SIGKDD Innovations Award, and the 2005 IEEE Computer Society Technical Achievement Award. The book: Han, Kamber and Pei, "Data Mining: Concepts and Techniques" (3rd ed., Morgan Kaufmann, 2011) has been popularly used as a textbook worldwide. He was the 2009 winner of the McDowell Award, the highest technical award made by IEEE.

== Bibliography ==
- Data Mining: Concepts and Techniques, 3rd edition (with Micheline Kamber and Jian Pei), The Morgan Kaufmann Series in Data Management Systems, Jim Gray, Series Editor Morgan Kaufmann Publishers, 2011. ISBN 1-55860-901-6
