= DeLoss Dodds =

American track and field athlete and coach, college athletics administrator

Biographical details
- Born: August 8, 1937 (age 88); Riley, Kansas, U.S.

Coaching career (HC unless noted)

Track
- 1963–1976: Kansas State

Administrative career (AD unless noted)
- 1977–1981: Kansas State
- 1981–2013: Texas

DeLoss Dodds (born August 8, 1937) is an American university sports administrator who was the sixth men's athletic director of The University of Texas at Austin.

During his tenure as AD from the fall of 1981 to November 2013, Texas won 19 National Championships and 287 conference titles. Dodds announced on October 1, 2013, that he would be retiring in 2014. Dodds became a special assistant to University of Texas President Bill Powers on November 25, 2013.

== Biography ==
Dodds was born August 8, 1937, in Riley, Kansas. He is married to Mary Ann (née Chamberlain); they have two daughters, Deidre, and Debra and one son, Doug. He is a graduate of Kansas State University, where he was also a conference champion in the quarter mile in 1959. Dodds was an All-American sprinter for the Kansas State Wildcats track and field team, finishing 6th in the 440 yards at the 1959 NCAA Track and Field Championships.

Before taking his position at Texas, he was the athletic director for the Kansas State Wildcats for five years, from 1977 to 1981. Before that, Dodds was head track coach at Kansas State, a position he held from 1963 to 1976, during which time his teams captured two Big Eight Conference indoor track and field championships (1974 & 1976).

Dodds was hired in 1981 as the University of Texas' men’s athletic director. During his tenure he helped Texas through many major events, including the 2010–12 conference realignment frenzy and $380 million in athletic facility upgrades.

== Achievements ==
- 2011 Athletic Director of the Year
- National Football Foundation and College Hall of Fame's John L. Toner Award in December 2006
- Inducted in the United States Track and Field and Cross Country Coaches Association Hall of Fame in 2006
- Inducted into the Drake Relays Coaches Hall of Fame in 1988
- Inducted into Kansas State Athletic Hall of Fame in 1995
- Inducted into the Texas Sports Hall of Fame in 2006
