= Osmar R. Zaiane =

German computer scientist and researcher

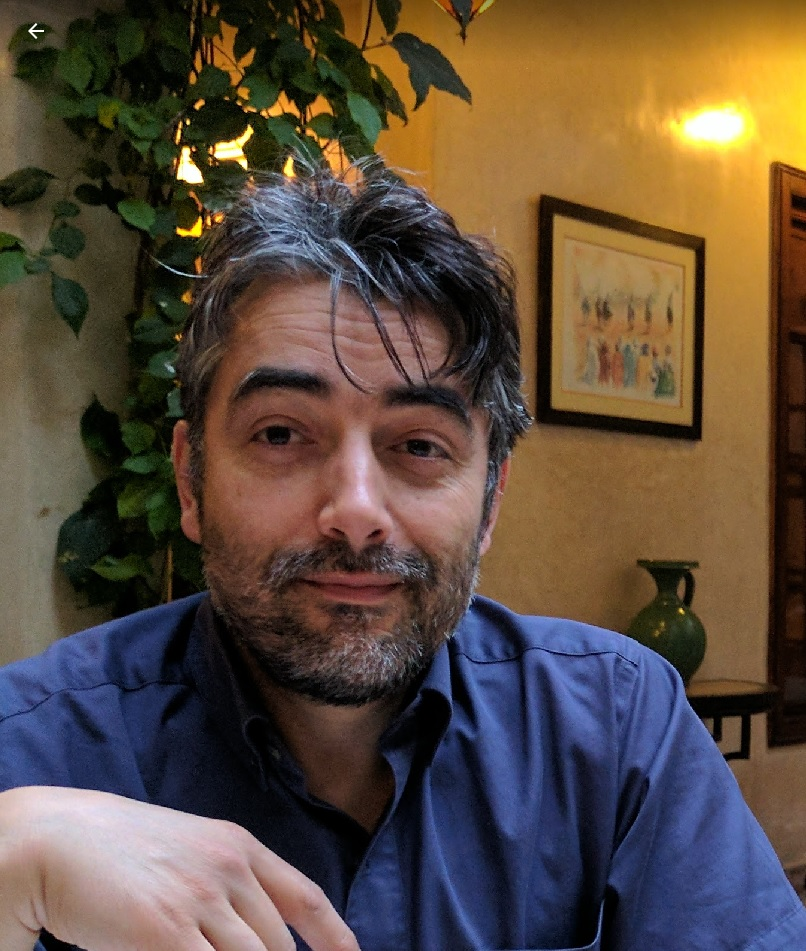
- Born: 11 April 1965 (age 61); Bad Kissingen, Germany
- Education: Simon Fraser University
- Awards: IEEE ICDM Outstanding Service Award 2009, ACM SIGKDD Service Award 2010, Canada CIFAR AI Chair, CS-Can/Info-Can Lifetime Achievement Award 2023, CAIAC Lifetime Achievement Award 2025
- Scientific career
- Fields: Data Mining, Machine Learning
- Workplaces: University of Alberta
- Doctoral advisor: Jiawei Han

Osmar R. Zaiane (born April 11, 1965, in Bad Kissingen, Germany) is a researcher, computer scientist, professor at the University of Alberta specializing in data mining and machine learning. He was the secretary treasurer of the Association for Computing Machinery (ACM) Special Interest Group on Knowledge Discovery and Data Mining (SIGKDD) from 2009 to 2012 and treasurer of the ACM Special Interest Group on Health Informatics. He served as the editor-in-chief of the SIGKDD Explorations publication from 2008 to 2010. He was also the associate editor of the same publication from 2004 to 2007.

A former PhD student of Professor Jiawei Han, he did his PhD on knowledge discovery from data at Simon Fraser University. Since 1999 he has been a professor in the Department of Computing Science at the University of Alberta in Canada, and was the scientific director of the Alberta Machine Intelligence Institute, formerly known as Alberta Innovates Centre for Machine Learning (AICML), from 2009 to 2020. He held visiting professor positions at Chung-Ang University in Korea, the University of Sydney in Australia, and Jean Monnet University in France. In 2009 he obtained the IEEE ICDM Outstanding Service Award, as well as the 2010 ACM SIGKDD Service Award the following year. He is a Canada CIFAR AI Chair holder with the Canadian Institute for Advanced Research, a Fellow of the Canadian Academy of Engineering, and a Fellow of the Asia-Pacific Artificial Intelligence Association. In 2024, he received the 2023 CS-Can/Info-Can Lifetime Achievement Award, and in 2025 the Canadian Artificial Intelligence Association (CAIAC) Lifetime Achievement Award.
