= Krzysztof Rybiński =

Polish economist and author

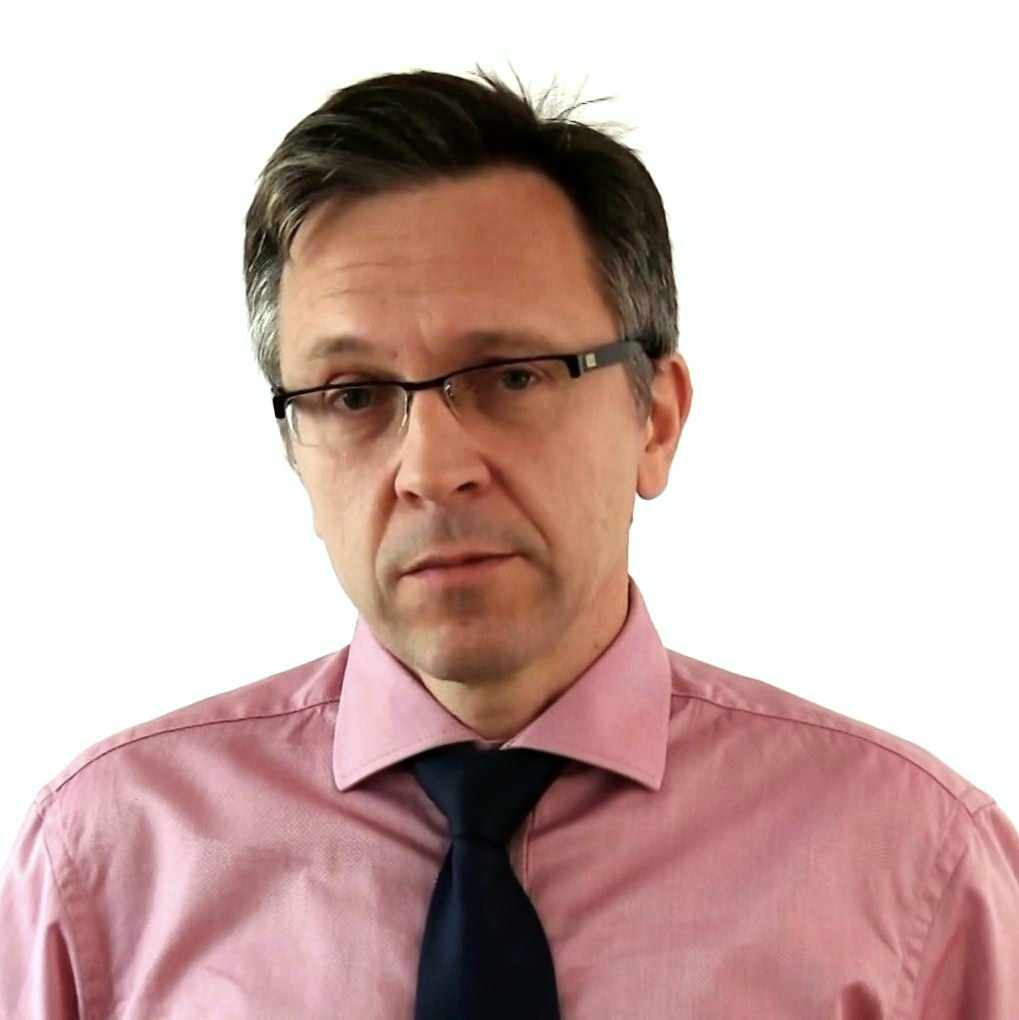
- Born: March 1, 1967 (age 59); Warsaw
- Education: University of Warsaw, SGH Warsaw School of Economics
- Title: Vice-president - National Bank of Poland (2004–2008), Chief Ideator - Synerise (2018–present)

Krzysztof Ireneusz Rybiński (born March 1, 1967, in Warsaw) is a Polish economist and author, professor of social sciences, vice-president of the National Bank of Poland (2004–2008).

== Life and career ==
In his youth he was a scout and a student of one of the schools in Warsaw's Praga district. He graduated from the Faculty of Mathematics, Computer Science and Mechanics and from the Faculty of Economic Sciences of the University of Warsaw, where he subsequently obtained a PhD in economics with an econometric specialty. In 2009, he was habilitated on the basis of a dissertation entitled "Globalization in Three Editions. Offshoring - Global Imbalances - Monetary policy" at the College of Economics and Social Sciences of the Warsaw School of Economics.

He worked as a computer scientist with a tech company in Japan, then as a research and didactic worker at the Faculty of Economic Sciences of the University of Warsaw. He was also a consultant at the World Bank, the Central European University and an administrative director at the Center for Economic Research in Central and Eastern Europe. In 1997 he became the chief economist of the Warsaw branch of ING Bank. From 2001 he was the chief economist of Bank Zachodni WBK, in 2002–2004 he was the chief economist of Bank BPH. He was the president of the Polish Association of Business Economists and a member of the Society of Polish Economists board.

From March 25, 2004, to January 2, 2008, he was the vice-president of the National Bank of Poland. From April 2008 to March 2010 he was a partner at Ernst & Young, where he led the economic strategy team. He was also an associate professor at the Warsaw School of Economics, vice-chairman of the supervisory board of Alior Bank and a co-owner of SanNao, a company implementing Internet solutions. From 2010 to 2015 he was the Vistula Academy of Finance and Business rector. In 2015 he became the rector of the Kazakh Economic University. In April 2018 he joined the Polish technology company Synerise, where he took the position of Chief Ideator. In 2021 President of Poland awarded him the title of the professor in social sciences, discipline economics and finance. In April 2023 he was appointed the rector of the European Humanities University in Vilnius.

He is the author of scientific and press publications in the field of economics, finance and machine learning.

== Political engagement ==
In 2010, he became an economic expert advisor, contributing to the PJN program. In 2011, he supported the economic program of the Congress of the New Right party. During the parliamentary elections in 2011, he was a candidate of the Union of Presidents - Citizens to the Senate in one of Warsaw's districts. He received 36,565 votes (16.23% of all votes), taking third place among four candidates.
