= Church of Our Lady of Consolation, Vilnius =

Roman Catholic church in Vilnius, Lithuania built in 1746–1768

Church of Our Lady of Consolation
- Švč. Mergelės Marijos Ramintojos bažnyčia
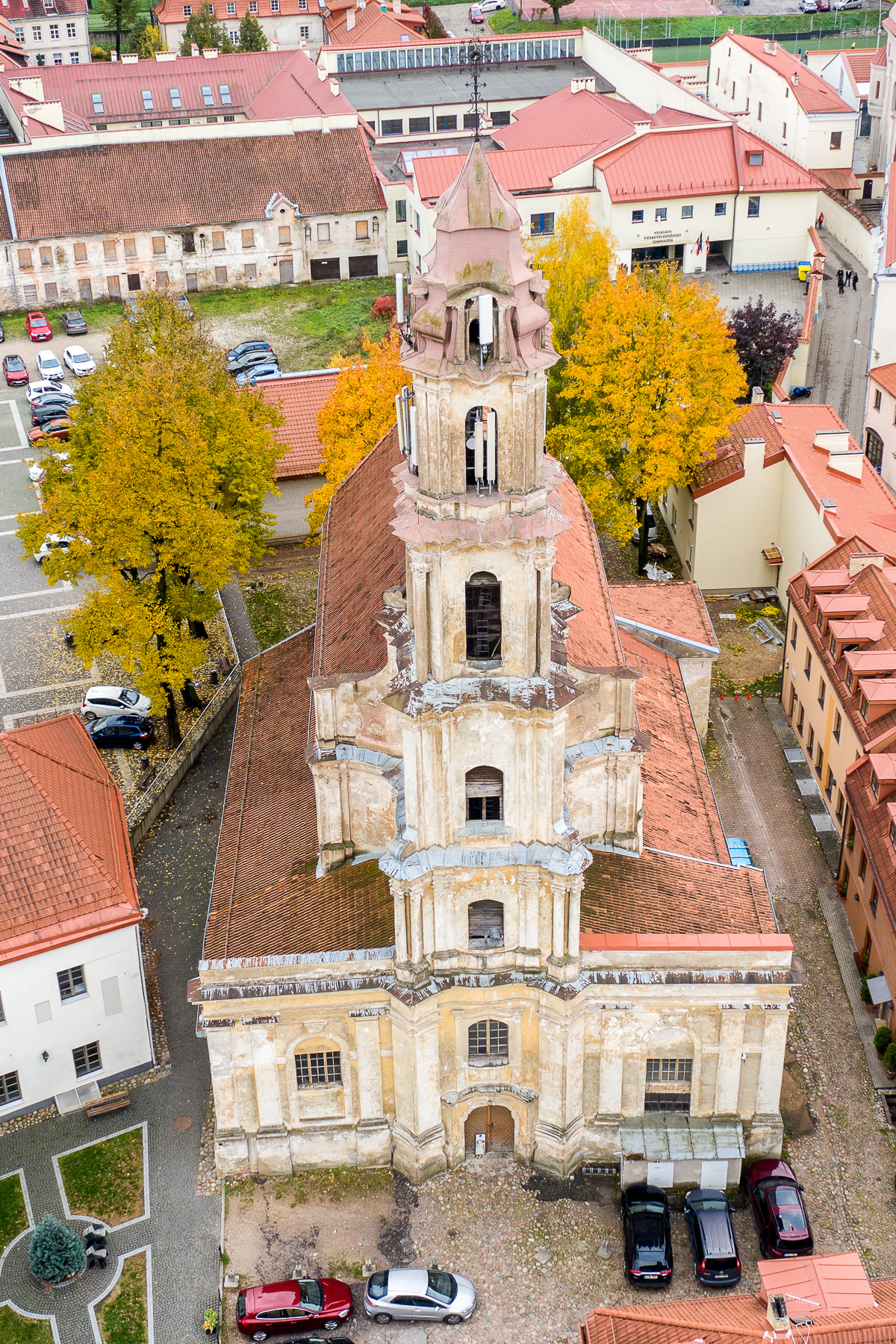
- Façade of the church in 2023

Religion
- Affiliation: Roman Catholic
- Diocese: Vilnius Old Town
- Ecclesiastical or organisational status: Used as a church and for other events
- Leadership: Roman Catholic Archdiocese of Vilnius
- Year consecrated: 1768

Location
- Location: Vilnius, Lithuania
- Interactive map of Church of Our Lady of Consolation
- Coordinates: 54°40′44.5″N 25°17′25.5″E

Architecture
- Type: Church
- Style: Baroque
- Completed: 1768
- Materials: Plastered masonry

Website
- Ramintoja.lt

Church of Our Lady of Consolation (Lithuanian: Švč. Mergelės Marijos Ramintojos bažnyčia) is a Roman Catholic church in the Vilnius Old Town which was built by the Augustinians in 1746–1768. It is the last landmark of the Vilnian Baroque architectural style.

Near the church there is a two-storey monastery complex.

Under the policy of Soviet state atheism, Christian churches were "turned into prisons, storage facilities, and even asylums." Following the independence of Lithuania from the USSR, the Church of the Blessed Virgin Mary of Consolation is in religious use again with the following in place: "the upper floor into their sanctuary, the middle floor became a place for discipleship courses, and the bottom floor is now a restaurant that employs people with disabilities."

Since 2017 the church belongs to the Ministry of the Interior of Lithuania.

== Gallery ==
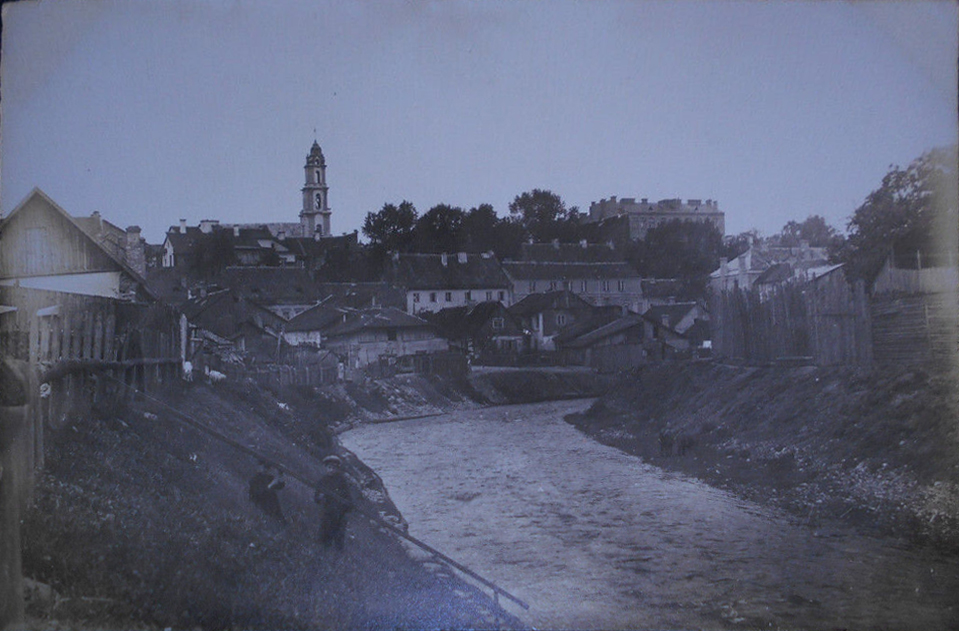
Church and its surroundings in 1915–1918

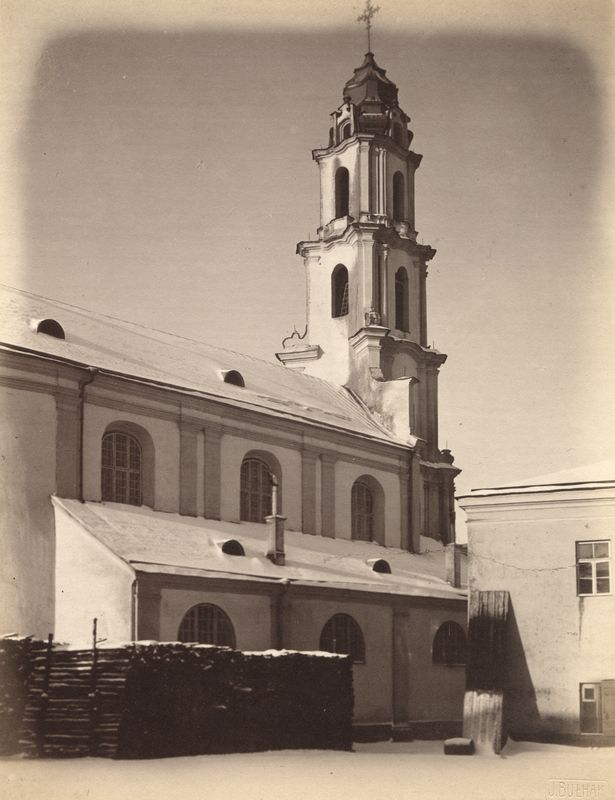
Side-view of the church in 1914

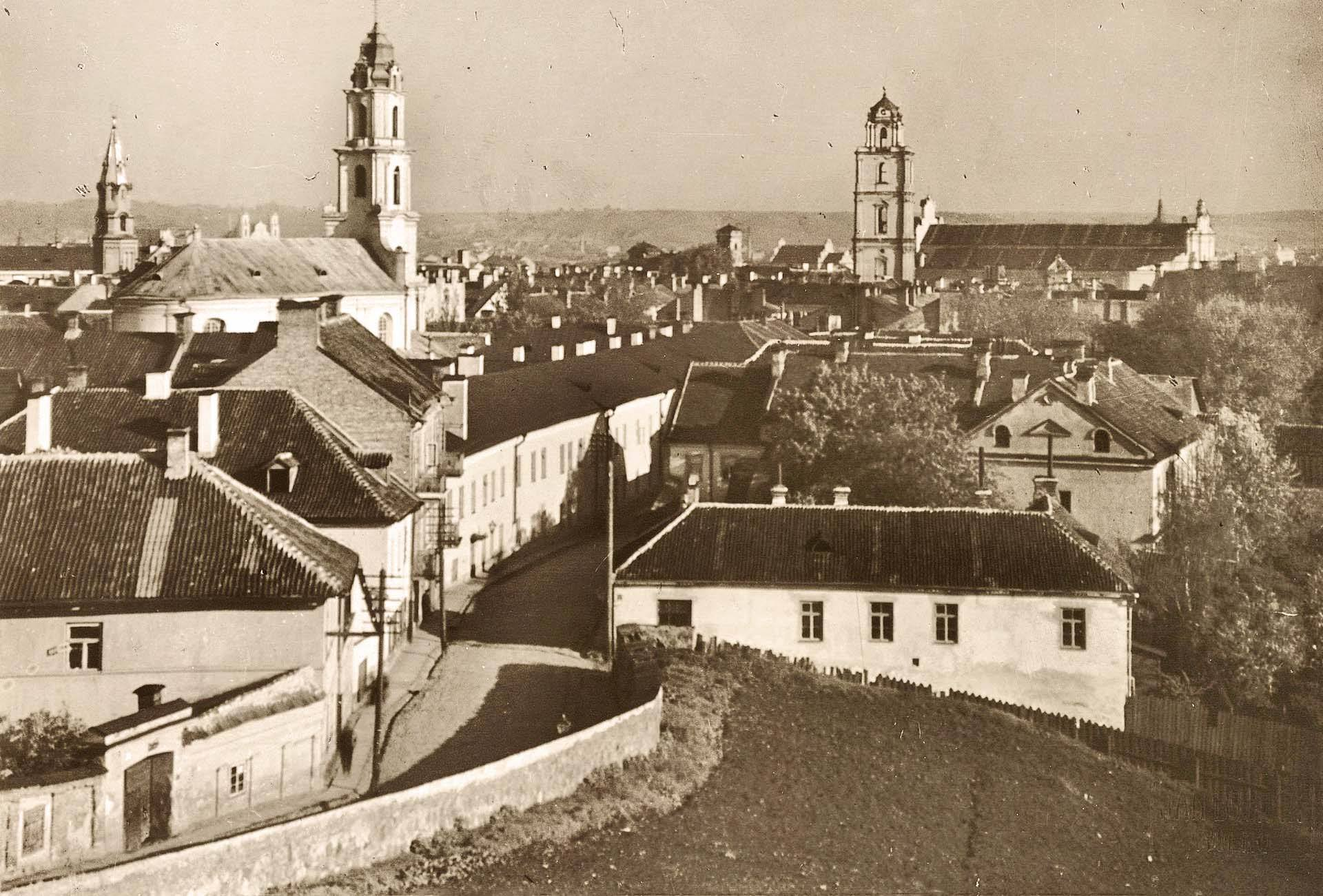
Church and its surroundings in 1917

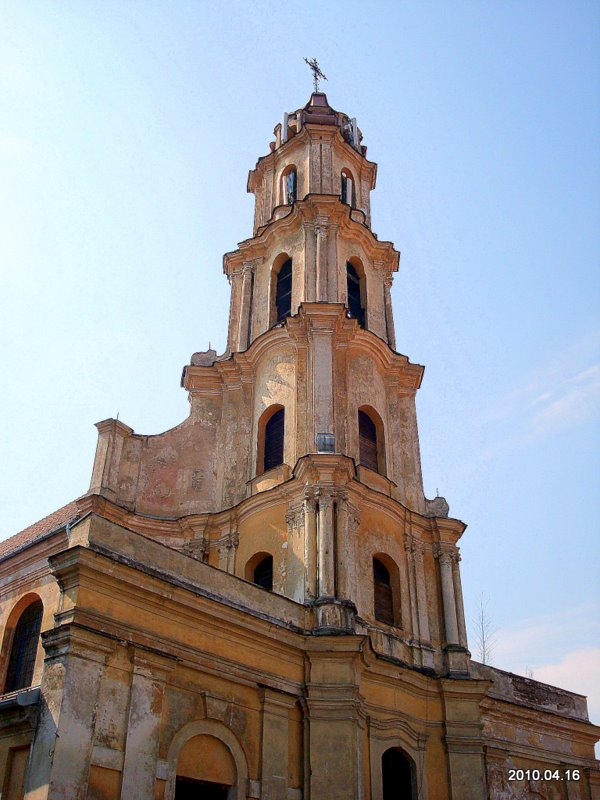
Close-view of the tower

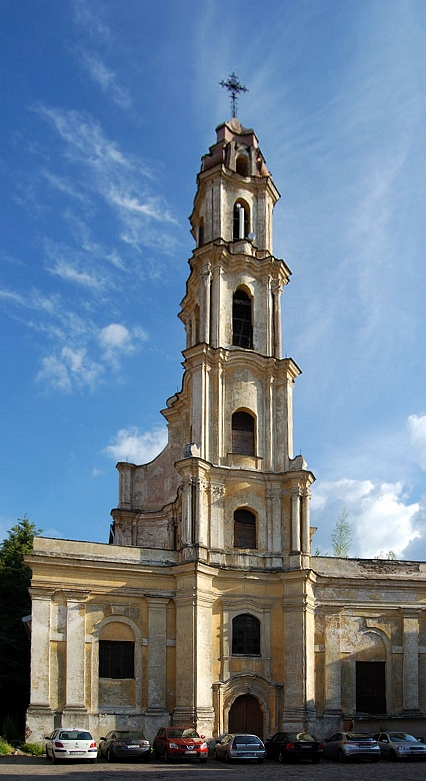
Façade of the church in 2009
