= The Nature of Space and Time =

- Authors: Roger Penrose; Stephen Hawking
- Language: English
- Subject: Physics
- Publisher: Princeton University Press
- Publication date: 1996
- Publication place: United States
- Media type: Print, e-book
- Pages: 160 pp.
- ISBN: 978-0691145709

The Nature of Space and Time is a book that documents a debate on physics and the philosophy of physics between the British theoretical physicists Roger Penrose and Stephen Hawking. The book was published by Princeton University Press in 1996. The event that is featured in the book took place in 1994 at the University of Cambridge's Isaac Newton Institute. The debate was modeled on the series of debates between Albert Einstein and Niels Bohr.
