= John Currie (athletic director) =

American athletic director

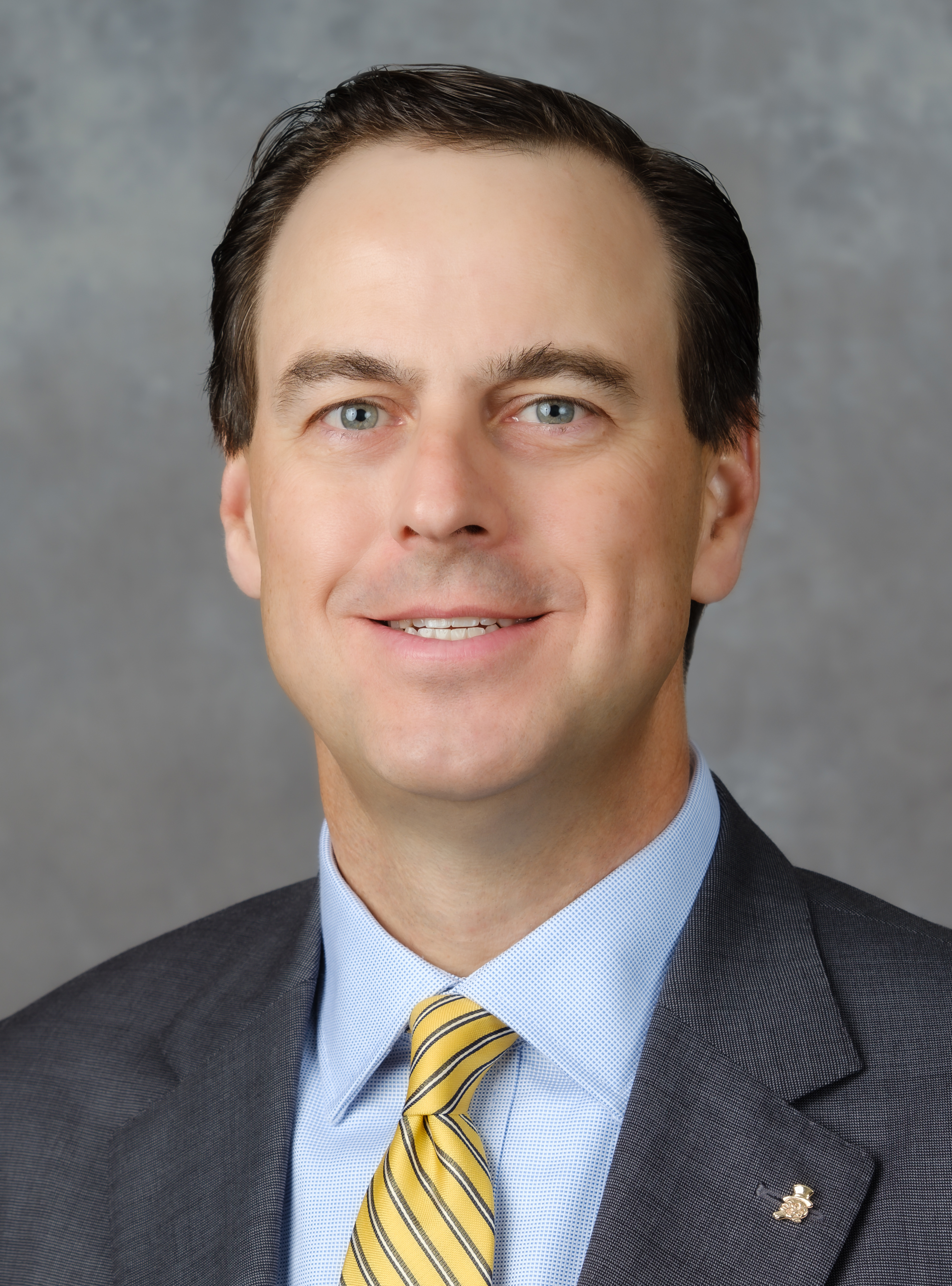
- Currie in 2019

Current position
- Title: Athletic director
- Team: Wake Forest
- Conference: ACC

Biographical details
- Born: April 1, 1971 (age 55); Chapel Hill, North Carolina, U.S.
- Education: Wake Forest University (1993); University of Tennessee (2003)

Administrative career (AD unless noted)
- 1998–2000: Wake Forest (asst. AD)
- 2000–2009: Tennessee (exec. assoc. AD)
- 2009–2017: Kansas State
- 2017: Tennessee
- 2019–present: Wake Forest

Accomplishments and honors

Awards
- Knoxville News Sentinel 40 under 40, 2008; Sports Business Journal 40 under 40, 2011; Under Armour AD of the Year, 2013; Bobby Dodd AD Award, 2013

John Angus Lauchlin Currie (born April 1, 1971) is a college athletics administrator, currently serving as the vice president and director of athletics at Wake Forest University. Prior to his post at Wake Forest, Currie held the position of Vice Chancellor and director of athletics at the University of Tennessee from February 28, 2017, until December 1, 2017.

== Education ==
Currie earned a Bachelor of Arts degree in history with a minor in politics from Wake Forest University in 1993 and a Master of Science degree in sport management from the University of Tennessee in 2003.

== Career ==
Currie began his professional career at Wake Forest in 1993 as a Deacon Club intern before he was appointed assistant Deacon Club director in 1994 (a position he held until 1997). After a two-year stint as Assistant Athletics Director at Wake Forest, Currie joined the University of Tennessee in 1997 as executive director of its Athletic Scholarship Fund. Currie served as Executive Associate Athletic Directory at University of Tennessee until 2009. He also served on the NCAA Division I Administrative Cabinet from 2010 to 2015, and became a Life Member of the Fiesta Bowl Board of Directors. From 2009 to 2017 Currie was the athletic director of Kansas State University. In 2017, Currie rejoined Tennessee but as an athletic director. In 2018, it was announced that he had joined the Columbia University's Sports Management graduate program as a professor. In 2019, Currie became the athletic director of Wake Forest.

=== Kansas State University ===
Currie administered K-State Athletics' projected $71 million budget, managed 165 employees, and maintained relations with 450 student athletes. He had cultivated relationships with alumni and donors, and his department projected a $4.4 million budget increase for the 2016 fiscal year. During Currie's tenure, the school's athletics budget has increased by $26 million over its 2010 budget of $44.1 million to $73 million. KSU's athletics budget has had a surplus for six consecutive years.

The university invested $190 million in new and upgraded facilities, including the West Stadium Center at Bill Snyder Family Stadium and a basketball training venue. In May 2015, a new football complex was under construction which was scheduled to open in September. In a letter to supporters dated June 30, 2015, Currie wrote that the KSU athletics department's first goal was to provide "A World-Class Student-Athlete Experience".

In October 2014, Currie asked the KSU Athletic Board of Directors to discontinue Women's Equestrian and replace it with Women's Soccer to maintain Title IX compliance for the university. Based on Currie's recommendation, K-State Athletic Board of Directors approved eliminating Women's Equestrian and replacing it with Women's Soccer. However, the NCAA ultimately tabled their committee's recommendation, making no changes to Women's Equestrian and its relationship with the NCAA.

=== University of Tennessee ===
Currie took over as athletic director on February 28, 2017. Currie was dismissed on December 1, 2017, related to agreeing to terms with then Ohio State defensive coordinator Greg Schiano to be the school's next head football coach. The Schiano recruitment led to a large protest by fans claiming Schiano had involvement in a cover-up of sexual assault during his time on the Penn State coaching staff, but Schiano has been cleared of any wrongdoing by officials from both Penn State and Ohio State. Tennessee received criticism from national sportswriters for a perceived overreactive response to social media. Currie later had a deal in place to hire Mike Leach, however the deal never came to be because of changes in UT’s administration. Phillip Fulmer organized a “palace coup”, replacing John Currie as AD and ultimately hired Jeremy Pruitt as head football coach. According to the Knoxville News Sentinel, Fulmer "wormed his way into the athletics director job after sabotaging the coaching search by former AD John Currie in 2017."

While at Tennessee in 2017, Currie hired baseball coach Tony Vitello, who went on to lead the Vols to three College World Series appearances in his first seven years.

=== Wake Forest University ===
Currie became Wake Forest's sixth athletic director in school history when he was named to the position on March 3, 2019. Currie is just the third individual to have held the position since 1964 following the 28-year tenure of Gene Hooks (1964–92) and 27-year tenure of Ron Wellman (1992–2019).

Currie led Wake Forest through the only major basketball change in the 2020 pandemic year. Currie hired Steve Forbes who was named 2022 ACC Coach of the Year. Wake Forest recently promoted Currie, adding vice president duties to his existing Director of Athletics role.

== Awards and achievements ==
Currie was announced winner of Sports Business Journal Forty Under 40 awards in 2011. As an athletic director, he fundraised more than $100 million from private donors, which made a record of receiving private gifts of $50 million at Tennessee in 2008 and $60 million at K-State in 2014. At Tennessee as Executive Associate Athletic Director, Currie was among Knoxville business' "40 under 40". After the Kansas State Wildcats won or shared Big 12 Conference championships in football, men's basketball and baseball in the 2012–13 academic year, Currie was honored as one of four 2013 Under Armour Athletic Directors of the Year by the National Association of Collegiate Directors of Athletics. He has been nationally recognized as a NACDA Athletic Director of the Year again in 2022.
