= Larry Travis =

Larry E. Travis
- Born: June 5, 1929; Imperial, Nebraska
- Died: August 14, 2017 (aged 88); Madison, Wisconsin
- Scientific career
- Fields: Expert systems
- Institutions: University of Wisconsin-Madison
- Doctoral advisor: Abraham Robinson
- Doctoral students: Jiawei Han

Larry E. Travis (June 5, 1929 – August 14, 2017) was a Professor Emeritus at the Department of Computer Sciences as the University of Wisconsin–Madison. He had a faculty position at the University of Wisconsin as early as 1964 (two years before his Ph.D.) until 1994. He got his Ph.D. from University of California, Los Angeles in 1966, with a dissertation titled as: A Logical Analysis of the Concept of Stored Program: A Step Toward a Possible Theory of Rational Learning.

== Selected publications ==
- Whitsitt, A.J. and Travis, L.E., 1996. Traffic route generation and adaptation using case-based reasoning. Journal of Intelligent Transportation Systems, 3(3), pp. 181–204.
- Stead WW, Haynes RB, Fuller S, Friedman CP, Travis LE, Beck JR, Fenichel CH, Chandrasekaran B, Buchanan BG, Abola EE, Sievert MC. Designing medical informatics research and library—resource projects to increase what is learned. Journal of the American Medical Informatics Association. 1994 Jan 1;1(1):28-33.
- West, D.M. and Travis, L.E., 1991. The computational metaphor and artificial intelligence: A reflective examination of a theoretical falsework. AI magazine, 12(1), pp. 64–64.
- West, David M., and Larry E. Travis. "From society to landscape: Alternative metaphors for artificial intelligence." AI Magazine 12, no. 2 (1991): 69-69.
- Travis, L.E., 1977. Data base system for AI applications. ACM SIGART Bulletin, (61), pp. 40–41.
- Travis, L.E., 1963. The value of introspection to the designer of mechanical problem solvers. Behavioral Science, 8(3), pp. 227–233.
- Travis, Larry E. "In defense of artificial intelligence research." Communications of the ACM 5, no. 1 (1962): 6–7.
