= Data item =

A data item describes an atomic state of a particular object concerning a specific property at a certain time point. A collection of data items for the same object at the same time forms an object instance (or table row). Any type of complex information can be broken down to elementary data items (atomic state). Data items are identified by object (o), property (p) and time (t), while the value (v) is a function of o, p and t: v = F(o,p,t).

Values typically are represented by symbols like numbers, texts, images, sounds or videos. Values are not necessarily atomic. A value's complexity depends on the complexity of the property and time component.

When looking at databases or XML files, the object is usually identified by an object name or other type of object identifier, which is part of the "data". Properties are defined as columns (table row), properties (object instance) or tags (XML). Often, time is not explicitly expressed and is an attribute applying to the complete data set. Other data collections provide time on the instance level (time series), column level, or even attribute/property level.
