= List of Big Eight Conference champions =

Big Eight Conference

Titles per University

All-Time Members
| Colorado | 43 |
| Drake | 3 |
| Grinnell | 3 |
| Iowa | 1 |
| Iowa State | 131 |
| Kansas | 207 |
| Kansas State | 60 |
| Missouri | 109 |
| Nebraska | 230 |
| Oklahoma | 196 |
| Oklahoma State | 168 |
| Washington U. | 10 |

Locations
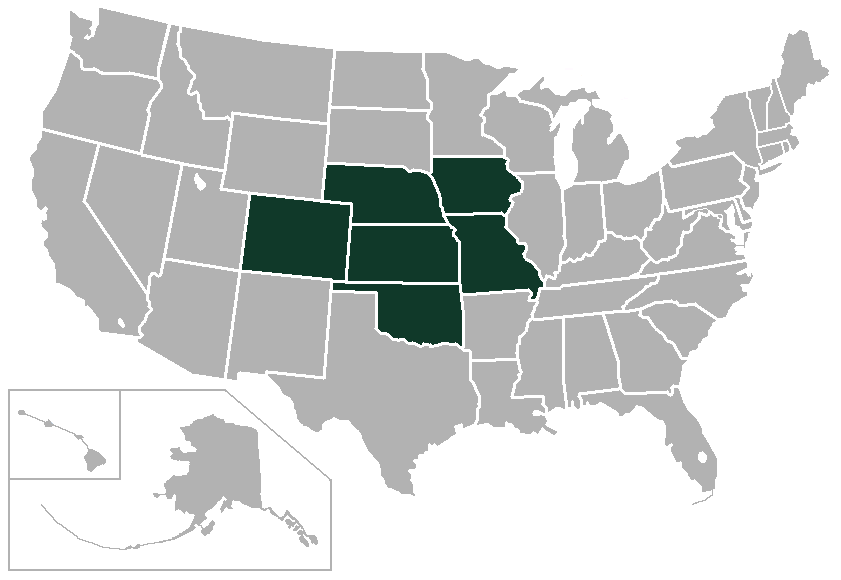

The Big Eight Conference sponsored championships in 21 sports (11 men's and 10 women's) at various times during its existence from 1907 to 1996. The conference began sponsoring women's sports in the mid-1970s under the direction of Assistant Commissioner Steven J. Hatchell.

Due to its common history with the Missouri Valley Conference, Big Eight championships from the 1907–08 through the 1927–28 academic year are also claimed by the MVC.

== Membership ==
Big Eight membership
| School | Admitted to conference | Left conference | Readmitted |
|---|---|---|---|
| **Colorado** | 1947 | — | — |
| Drake | 1907 | 1928 | — |
| Grinnell | 1919 | 1928 | — |
| Iowa | 1907 | 1910 | — |
| **Iowa State** | 1908 | — | — |
| **Kansas** | 1907 | — | — |
| **Kansas State** | 1913 | — | — |
| **Missouri** | 1907 | — | — |
| **Nebraska** | 1907 | 1918 | 1920 |
| **Oklahoma** | 1920 | — | — |
| **Oklahoma State** | 1925 | 1928 | 1957 |
| Washington-St. Louis | 1907 | 1928 | — |
Teams in **bold** were members of the conference upon its dissolution in 1996; References:

== Baseball ==
The following are the MVIAA/Big Eight regular-season and post-season champions from the 1909 through the 1996 season when the Big Eight was dissolved. Starting in 1976, a post-season tournament was held in order to determine a conference champion.

=== Championships ===
Baseball championship summary
| School | Total titles | Regular season | Tournament |
|---|---|---|---|
| Colorado | 0 | 0 | 0 |
| Drake | 0 | 0 | 0 |
| Iowa State | 5 | 5 | 0 |
| Kansas | 8 | 8 | 0 |
| Kansas State | 3 | 3 | 0 |
| Missouri | 26 | 24 | 2 |
| Nebraska | 5 | 5 | 0 |
| Oklahoma | 27 | 25 | 2 |
| Oklahoma State | 37 | 20 | 17 |
| Washington (St. Louis) | 1 | 1 | 0 |

| Season | Regular season | Tournament |
MVIAA
| 1909 | Nebraska | – |
| 1910 | Missouri | – |
| 1911 | none | – |
| 1912 | Missouri | – |
| 1913 | Kansas | – |
| 1914 | Kansas | – |
| 1915 | Kansas | – |
| 1916 | Kansas; Missouri | – |
| 1917 | Missouri | – |
| 1918 | Missouri | – |
| 1919 | none | – |
| 1920 | Washington | – |
| 1921 | Kansas | – |
| 1922 | Kansas | – |
| 1923 | Kansas | – |
| 1924 | Iowa State | – |
| 1925 | Oklahoma | – |
| 1926 | Oklahoma | – |
| 1927 | Oklahoma | – |
| 1928 | Kansas State | – |
Big Six Conference
| 1929 | Nebraska | – |
| 1930 | Kansas State; Nebraska | – |
| 1931 | Oklahoma; Missouri | – |
| 1932 | Missouri | – |
| 1933 | Kansas State; Oklahoma | – |
| 1934 | none | – |
| 1935 | Oklahoma | – |
| 1936 | Iowa State; Oklahoma | – |
| 1937 | Missouri | – |
| 1938 | Missouri | – |
| 1939 | Oklahoma | – |
| 1940 | Oklahoma | – |
| 1941 | Missouri | – |
| 1942 | Missouri | – |
| 1943 | none | – |
| 1944 | none | – |
| 1945 | none | – |
| 1946 | Oklahoma | – |
| 1947 | Oklahoma | – |
Big Seven Conference
| 1948 | Nebraska | – |
| 1949 | Kansas | – |
| 1950 | Nebraska | – |
| 1951 | **Oklahoma** | – |
| 1952 | Missouri | – |
| 1953 | Oklahoma | – |
| 1954 | **Missouri** | – |
| 1955 | Oklahoma | – |
| 1956 | Oklahoma | – |
| 1957 | Iowa State | – |
| 1958 | Missouri | – |
Big Eight Conference
| 1959 | **Oklahoma State** | – |
| 1960 | Oklahoma State | – |
| 1961 | Oklahoma State | – |
| 1962 | Missouri | – |
| 1963 | Missouri | – |
| 1964 | Missouri | – |
| 1965 | Missouri | – |
| 1966 | Oklahoma State | – |
| 1967 | Oklahoma State | – |
| 1968 | Oklahoma State | – |
| 1969 | Oklahoma State | – |
| 1970 | Iowa State | – |
| 1971 | Iowa State | – |
| 1972 | Oklahoma | – |
| 1973 | Oklahoma | – |
| 1974 | Oklahoma | – |
| 1975 | Oklahoma | – |
| 1976 | Missouri | Missouri |
| 1977^{†} | East: Oklahoma; West: Missouri | Oklahoma |
| 1978^{†} | East: Oklahoma; West: Missouri | Oklahoma State |
| 1979^{†} | East: Oklahoma; West: Missouri | Oklahoma |
| 1980^{†} | East: Nebraska; West: Oklahoma State | Missouri |
| 1981 | Missouri | Oklahoma State |
| 1982 | Oklahoma State | Oklahoma State |
| 1983 | Oklahoma State | Oklahoma State |
| 1984 | Oklahoma State | Oklahoma State |
| 1985 | Oklahoma State | Oklahoma State |
| 1986 | Oklahoma | Oklahoma State |
| 1987 | Oklahoma State | Oklahoma State |
| 1988 | Oklahoma State | Oklahoma State |
| 1989 | Oklahoma State | Oklahoma State |
| 1990 | Oklahoma State | Oklahoma State |
| 1991 | Oklahoma State | Oklahoma State |
| 1992 | Oklahoma State | Oklahoma State |
| 1993 | Oklahoma State | Oklahoma State |
| 1994 | Oklahoma State | Oklahoma State |
| 1995 | Oklahoma | Oklahoma State |
| 1996 | Missouri | Oklahoma State |

^{†}During these seasons, the Big Eight was split into two divisions.

== Men's basketball ==
The following are the MVIAA/Big Eight regular-season conference champions from the 1907-08 through the 1995-96 season when the Big Eight was dissolved.

=== Regular season championships ===
Men's basketball regular season championship summary
| School | Total titles | Seasons |
|---|---|---|
| Colorado | 5 | 1953-54 • 1954-55 • 1961-62 • 1962-63 • 1968-69 |
| Drake | 0 | – |
| Grinnell | 0 | – |
| Iowa State | 4 | 1934-35 • 1940-41 • 1943-44 • 1944-45 |
| Kansas | 43 | 1907-08 • 1908-09 • 1909-10 • 1910-11 • 1911-12 • 1913-14 • 1914-15 • 1921-22 • 1922-23 • 1923-24 • 1924-25 • 1925-26 • 1926-27 • 1930-31 • 1931-32 • 1932-33 • 1933-34 • 1935-36 • 1936-37 • 1937-38 • 1939-40 • 1940-41 • 1941-42 • 1942-43 • 1945-46 • 1949-50 • 1951-52 • 1952-53 • 1953-54 • 1956-57 • 1959-60 • 1965-66 • 1966-67 • 1970-71 • 1973-74 • 1974-75 • 1977-78 • 1985-86 • 1990-91 • 1991-92 • 1992-93 • 1994-95 • 1995-96 |
| Kansas State | 17 | 1916-17 • 1918-19 • 1947-48 • 1949-50 • 1950-51 • 1955-56 • 1957-58 • 1958-59 • 1959-60 • 1960-61 • 162-963 • 1963-64 • 1967-68 • 1969-70 • 1971-72 • 1972-73 • 1976-77 |
| Missouri | 15 | 1917-18 • 1919-20 • 1920-21 • 1921-22 • 1929-30 • 1938-39 • 1939-40 • 1975-76 • 1979-80 • 1980-81 • 1981-82 • 1982-83 • 1986-87 • 1989-90 • 1993-94 |
| Nebraska | 7 | 1911-12 • 1912-13 • 1913-14 • 1915-16 • 1936-37 • 1948-49 • 1949-50 |
| Oklahoma | 13 | 1927-28 • 1928-29 • 1938-39 • 1939-40 • 1941-42 • 1943-44 • 1946-47 • 1948-49 • 1978-79 • 1983-84 • 1984-85 • 1987-88 • 1999-89 |
| Oklahoma State | 2 | 1964-65 • 1990-91 |
| Washington (St. Louis) | 0 | – |
**Shared championships are in italics.**

| Season | Champion(s) |
MVIAA
| 1907-08^{†} | Kansas |
| 1908-09^{†} | Kansas |
| 1909-10^{†} | Kansas |
| 1910-11 | Kansas |
| 1911-12 | Nebraska; Kansas |
| 1912-13^{†} | Nebraska |
| 1913-14 | Nebraska; Kansas |
| 1914-15 | Kansas |
| 1915-16 | Nebraska |
| 1916-17 | Kansas State |
| 1917-18 | Missouri |
| 1918-19 | Kansas State |
| 1919-20 | Missouri |
| 1920-21 | Missouri |
| 1921-22 | Missouri; Kansas |
| 1922-23 | Kansas |
| 1923-24 | Kansas |
| 1924-25 | Kansas |
| 1925-26 | Kansas |
| 1926-27 | Kansas |
| 1927-28 | Oklahoma |
Big Six Conference
| 1928-29 | Oklahoma |
| 1929-30 | Missouri |
| 1930-31 | Kansas |
| 1931-32 | Kansas |
| 1932-33 | Kansas |
| 1933-34 | Kansas |
| 1934-35 | Iowa State |
| 1935-36 | Kansas |
| 1936-37 | Kansas; Nebraska |
| 1937-38 | Kansas |
| 1938-39 | Missouri; Oklahoma |
| 1939-40 | Kansas; Missouri; Oklahoma |
| 1940-41 | Iowa State; Kansas |
| 1941-42 | Kansas; Oklahoma |
| 1942-43 | Kansas |
| 1943-44 | Iowa State; Oklahoma |
| 1944-45 | Iowa State |
| 1945-46 | Kansas |
| 1946-47 | Oklahoma |
Big Seven Conference
| 1947-48 | Kansas State |
| 1948-49 | Nebraska; Oklahoma |
| 1949-50 | Kansas State; Nebraska; Kansas |
| 1950-51 | Kansas State |
| 1951-52 | **Kansas** |
| 1952-53 | Kansas |
| 1953-54 | Kansas; Colorado |
| 1954-55 | Colorado |
| 1955-56 | Kansas State |
| 1956-57 | Kansas |
| 1957-58 | Kansas State |
Big Eight Conference
| 1958-59 | Kansas State |
| 1959-60 | Kansas; Kansas State |
| 1960-61 | Kansas State |
| 1961-62 | Colorado |
| 1962-63 | Colorado; Kansas State |
| 1963-64 | Kansas State |
| 1964-65 | Oklahoma State |
| 1965-66 | Kansas |
| 1966-67 | Kansas |
| 1967-68 | Kansas State |
| 1968-69 | Colorado |
| 1969-70 | Kansas State |
| 1970-71 | Kansas |
| 1971-72 | Kansas State |
| 1972-73 | Kansas State |
| 1973-74 | Kansas |
| 1974-75 | Kansas |
| 1975-76 | Missouri |
| 1976-77 | Kansas State |
| 1977-78 | Kansas |
| 1978-79 | Oklahoma |
| 1979-80 | Missouri |
| 1980-81 | Missouri |
| 1981-82 | Missouri |
| 1982-83 | Missouri |
| 1983-84 | Oklahoma |
| 1984-85 | Oklahoma |
| 1985-86 | Kansas |
| 1986-87 | Missouri |
| 1987-88 | Oklahoma |
| 1988-89 | Oklahoma |
| 1989-90 | Missouri |
| 1990-91 | Kansas; Oklahoma State |
| 1991-92 | Kansas |
| 1992-93 | Kansas |
| 1993-94 | Missouri |
| 1994-95 | Kansas |
| 1995-96 | Kansas |

^{†}During these seasons, a playoff was held to determine the conference regular season champion.

=== Holiday tournament champions ===
From the 1946-47 through the 1978-79 season, the Big Eight hosted a mid-season holiday tournament in which all of the league teams participated. From the 1946-47 through the 1957-58 season when the conference had fewer than eight members, non-member schools would be invited in order to field an 8-team tournament. Among teams invited from outside the conference, only SMU during the 1946-47 season ever won the tournament.

Men's basketball holiday tournament championship summary
| School | Total titles | Season |
|---|---|---|
| Colorado | 0 | – |
| Iowa State | 2 | 1955-56 • 1959-60 |
| Kansas | 13 | 1951-52 • 1953-54 • 1956-57 • 1957-58 • 1962-63 • 1964-65 • 1965-66 • 1966-67 • 1968-69 • 1970-71 • 1974-75 • 1977-78 • 1978-79 |
| Kansas State | 7 | 1947-48 • 1950-51 • 1952-53 • 1958-59 • 1960-61 • 1961-62 • 1963-64 |
| Missouri | 7 | 1949-50 • 1954-55 • 1971-72 • 1972-73 • 1973-74 • 1975-76 • 1976-77 |
| Nebraska | 1 | 1967-68 |
| Oklahoma | 2 | 1948-49 • 1969-70 |
| Oklahoma State | 0 | – |
| SMU | 1 | 1946-47 |

| Season | Champion(s) |
Big Six Conference
| 1946-47^{†} | SMU |
Big Seven Conference
| 1947-48 | Kansas State |
| 1948-49 | Oklahoma |
| 1949-50 | Missouri |
| 1950-51 | Kansas State |
| 1951-52 | Kansas |
| 1952-53 | Kansas State |
| 1953-54 | Kansas |
| 1954-55 | Missouri |
| 1955-56 | Iowa State |
| 1956-57 | Kansas |
| 1957-58 | Kansas |
Big Eight Conference
| 1958-59 | Kansas State |
| 1959-60 | Iowa State |
| 1960-61 | Kansas State |
| 1961-62 | Kansas State |
| 1962-63 | Kansas |
| 1963-64 | Kansas State |
| 1964-65 | Kansas |
| 1965-66 | Kansas |
| 1966-67 | Kansas |
| 1967-68 | Nebraska |
| 1968-69 | Kansas |
| 1969-70 | Oklahoma |
| 1970-71 | Kansas |
| 1971-72 | Missouri |
| 1972-73 | Missouri |
| 1973-74 | Missouri |
| 1974-75 | Kansas |
| 1975-76 | Missouri |
| 1976-77 | Missouri |
| 1977-78 | Kansas |
| 1978-79 | Kansas |

^{†}SMU was non-member of the conference invited to the Holiday Tournament.

=== Post-season tournament champions ===
Starting during the 1976-77 season, the conference held a post-season tournament in order to determine the conference bid to the NCAA tournament. All Big Eight men's basketball post-season tournaments were held at Kemper Arena in Kansas City, MO. However, from the 1976-77 to 1984-85 season, quarterfinal rounds were played on the home courts of the top four seeds in the tournament.

Men's basketball post-season tournament championship summary
| School | Total titles | Seasons |
|---|---|---|
| Colorado | 0 | – |
| Iowa State | 1 | 1995–96 |
| Kansas | 4 | 1980–81 • 1983–84 • 1985–86 • 1991–92 |
| Kansas State | 2 | 1976–77 • 1979–80 |
| Missouri | 6 | 1977–78 • 1981–82 • 1986–87 • 1988–89 • 1990–91 • 1992–93 |
| Nebraska | 1 | 1993–94 |
| Oklahoma | 4 | 1978–79 • 1984–85 • 1987–88 • 1989–90 |
| Oklahoma State | 2 | 1982–83 • 1994–95 |

| Season | Champion(s) |
Big Eight Conference
| 1976–77 | Kansas State |
| 1977–78 | Missouri |
| 1978–79 | Oklahoma |
| 1979–80 | Kansas State |
| 1980–81 | Kansas |
| 1981–82 | Missouri |
| 1982–83 | Oklahoma State |
| 1983–84 | Kansas |
| 1984–85 | Oklahoma |
| 1985–86 | Kansas |
| 1986–87 | Missouri |
| 1987–88 | Oklahoma |
| 1988–89 | Missouri |
| 1989–90 | Oklahoma |
| 1990–91 | Missouri |
| 1991–92 | Kansas |
| 1992–93 | Missouri |
| 1993–94 | Nebraska |
| 1994–95 | Oklahoma State |
| 1995–96 | Iowa State |

== Women's basketball ==
The following are the MVIAA/Big Eight regular-season and post-season champions from the 1975-76 through the 199596 season when the Big Eight was dissolved. The conference sponsored a mid-season tournament from the 1975–1976 season through the 1981–1982 season, before switching to a post-season tournament in 1983.

=== Championships ===
Women's championship summary
| School | Total titles | Regular season titles | Tournament titles |
|---|---|---|---|
| Colorado | 8 | 4 | 4 |
| Iowa State | 0 | 0 | 0 |
| Kansas | 9 | 3 | 6 |
| Kansas State | 7 | 3 | 4 |
| Missouri | 9 | 4 | 5 |
| Nebraska | 1 | 1 | 0 |
| Oklahoma | 1 | 1 | 0 |
| Oklahoma State | 3 | 1 | 2 |

| Season | Regular season | Tournament |
Big Eight Conference
| 1975-76 | none | Kansas State |
| 1976-77 | none | Kansas State |
| 1977-78 | none | Missouri |
| 1978-79 | none | Kansas |
| 1979-80 | none | Kansas |
| 1980-81 | none | Kansas |
| 1981-82 | none | Kansas State |
| 1982-83 | Kansas State | Missouri |
| 1983-84 | Missouri; Kansas State | Kansas State |
| 1984-85 | Missouri | Missouri |
| 1985-86 | Oklahoma | Missouri |
| 1986-87 | Kansas State; Kansas; Missouri | Kansas |
| 1987-88 | Nebraska | Kansas |
| 1988-89 | Colorado | Colorado |
| 189-990 | Missouri | Oklahoma State |
| 1990-91 | Oklahoma State | Oklahoma State |
| 1991-92 | Kansas | Colorado |
| 1992-93 | Colorado | Kansas |
| 1993-94 | Colorado | Missouri |
| 1994-95 | Colorado | Colorado |
| 1995-96 | Kansas | Colorado |

== Men's cross country ==
The following are the MVIAA/Big Eight regular-season conference champions from the 1911 through the 1995 season when the Big Eight was dissolved.

=== Championships ===
Men's cross country championship summary
| School | Total titles | Years |
|---|---|---|
| Colorado | 10 | 1962 • 1976 • 1977 • 1978 • 1979 • 1980 • 1982 • 1985 • 1986 • 1992 |
| Drake | 0 | – |
| Grinnell | 0 | – |
| Iowa State | 25 | 1911 • 1913 • 1914 • 1915 • 1916 • 1917 • 1919 • 1920 • 1921 • 1922 • 1923 • 1926 • 1930 • 1931 • 1974 • 1981 • 1983 • 1984 • 1987 • 1988 • 1989 • 1990 • 1991 • 1993 • 1994 |
| Kansas | 19 | 1928 • 1947 • 1948 • 1949 • 1950 • 1951 • 1952 • 1953 • 1954 • 1955 • 1956 • 1957 • 1958 • 1959 • 1961 • 1963 • 1964 • 1968 • 1969 |
| Kansas State | 13 | 1924 • 1925 • 1932 • 1933 • 1934 • 1936 • 1937 • 1938 • 1939 • 1965 • 1966 • 1971 • 1975 |
| Missouri | 3 | 1912 • 1967 • 1970 • 1974 |
| Nebraska | 1 | 1940 |
| Oklahoma | 5 | 1927 • 1929 • 1935 • 1941 • 1946 |
| Oklahoma State | 4 | 1960 • 1972 • 1973 • 1995 |
| Washington (St. Louis) | 0 | – |
**Shared championships are in italics.**

| Season | Champion(s) |
MVIAA
| 1911 | Iowa State |
| 1912 | Missouri |
| 1913 | Iowa State |
| 1914 | Iowa State |
| 1915 | Iowa State |
| 1916 | Iowa State |
| 1917 | Iowa State |
| 1918 | none |
| 1919 | Iowa State |
| 1920 | Iowa State |
| 1921 | Iowa State |
| 1922 | Iowa State |
| 1923 | Iowa State |
| 1924 | Kansas State |
| 1925 | Kansas State |
| 1926 | Iowa State |
| 1927 | Oklahoma |
| 1928 | Kansas |
Big Six Conference
| 1929 | Oklahoma |
| 1930 | Iowa State |
| 1931 | Iowa State |
| 1932 | Kansas State |
| 1933 | Kansas State |
| 1934 | Kansas State |
| 1935 | Oklahoma |
| 1936 | Kansas State |
| 1937 | Kansas State |
| 1938 | Kansas State |
| 1939 | Kansas State |
| 1940 | Nebraska |
| 1941 | Oklahoma |
| 1942 | none |
| 1943 | none |
| 1944 | none |
| 1945 | none |
| 1946 | Oklahoma |
| 1947 | Kansas |
Big Seven Conference
| 1948 | Kansas |
| 1949 | Kansas |
| 1950 | Kansas |
| 1951 | Kansas |
| 1952 | Kansas |
| 1953 | **Kansas** |
| 1954 | Kansas |
| 1955 | Kansas |
| 1956 | Kansas |
| 1957 | Kansas |
| 1958 | Kansas |
Big Eight Conference
| 1959 | Kansas |
| 1960 | Oklahoma State |
| 1961 | Kansas |
| 1962 | Colorado |
| 1963 | Kansas |
| 1964 | Kansas |
| 1965 | Kansas State |
| 1966 | Kansas State |
| 1967 | Missouri |
| 1968 | Kansas |
| 1969 | Kansas |
| 1970 | Missouri |
| 1971 | Kansas State |
| 1972 | Oklahoma State |
| 1973 | Oklahoma State |
| 1974 | Missouri; Iowa State |
| 1975 | Kansas State |
| 1976 | Colorado |
| 1977 | Colorado |
| 1978 | Colorado |
| 1979 | Colorado |
| 1980 | Colorado |
| 1981 | Iowa State |
| 1982 | Colorado |
| 1983 | Iowa State |
| 1984 | Iowa State |
| 1985 | Colorado |
| 1986 | Colorado |
| 1987 | Iowa State |
| 1988 | Iowa State |
| 1989 | **Iowa State** |
| 1990 | Iowa State |
| 1991 | Iowa State |
| 1992 | Colorado |
| 1993 | Iowa State |
| 1994 | **Iowa State** |
| 1995 | Oklahoma State 2017-12-15. |

== Women's cross country ==
The following are the MVIAA/Big Eight regular-season conference champions from the 1975 through the 1995 season when the Big Eight was dissolved.

=== Championships ===
Women's cross country championship summary
| School | Total titles | Years |
|---|---|---|
| Colorado | 4 | 1987 • 1992 • 1994 • 1995 |
| Iowa State | 8 | 1975 • 1976 • 1977 • 1978 • 1979 • 1981 • 1983 • 1990 |
| Kansas | 0 | – |
| Kansas State | 2 | 1982 • 1992 |
| Missouri | 2 | 1980 • 1984 |
| Nebraska | 5 | 1985 • 1988 • 1989 • 1991 • 1993 |
| Oklahoma | 0 | – |
| Oklahoma State | 1 | 1986 |
**Shared championships are in italics.**

| Season | Champion(s) |
Big Eight Conference
| 1975 | **Iowa State^{†}** |
| 1976 | **Iowa State^{†}** |
| 1977 | **Iowa State^{†}** |
| 1978 | **Iowa State^{†}** |
| 1979 | Iowa State |
| 1980 | Missouri |
| 1981 | **Iowa State^{†}** |
| 1982 | Kansas State |
| 1983 | Iowa State |
| 1984 | Missouri |
| 1985 | Nebraska |
| 1986 | Oklahoma State |
| 1987 | Colorado |
| 1988 | Nebraska |
| 1989 | Nebraska |
| 1990 | Iowa State |
| 1991 | Nebraska |
| 1992 | Colorado; Kansas State |
| 1993 | Nebraska |
| 1994 | Colorado |
| 1995 | Colorado |

^{†}Denotes an AIAW title, the predecessor to the NCAA for women's athletics.

== Football ==
The following are the MVIAA/Big Eight regular-season conference champions from the 1907 through the 1995 season when the Big Eight was dissolved.

=== Championships ===
Football championships summary
| School | Total titles | Years |
|---|---|---|
| Colorado | 5 | 1961 • 1976 • 1989 • 1990 • 1991 |
| Drake | 0 | – |
| Grinnell | 0 | – |
| Iowa | 1 | 1907 |
| Iowa State | 2 | 1911 • 1912 |
| Kansas | 5 | 1908 • 1930 • 1946 • 1947 • 1968 |
| Kansas State | 1 | 1934 |
| Missouri | 12 | 1909 • 1913 • 1919 • 1924 • 1925 • 1927 • 1939 • 1941 • 1942 • 1945 • 1960^{†} • 1969 |
| Nebraska | 41 | 1907 • 1910 • 1911 • 1912 • 1913 • 1914 • 1915 • 1916 • 1917 • 1921 • 1922 • 1923 • 1928 • 1929 • 1931 • 1932 • 1933 • 1935 • 1936 • 1937 • 1940 • 1963 • 1964 • 1965 • 1966 • 1969 • 1970 • 1971 • 1972^{‡} • 1975 • 1978 • 1981 • 1982 • 1983 • 1984 • 1988 • 1991 • 1992 • 1993 • 1994 • 1995 |
| Oklahoma | 34 | 1920 • 1933 • 1938 • 1943 • 1944 • 1946 • 1947 • 1948 • 1949 • 1950 • 1951 • 1952 • 1953 • 1954 • 1955 • 1956 • 1957 • 1958 • 1959 • 1962 • 1967 • 1968 • 1973 • 1974 • 1975 • 1976 • 1977 • 1978 • 1979 • 1980 • 1984 • 1985 • 1986 • 1987 |
| Oklahoma State | 2 | 1926 • 1976 |
| Washington (St. Louis) | 0 | – |
**Shared championships are in italics.**

| Season | Champion(s) |
MVIAA
| 1907 | Iowa; Nebraska |
| 1908 | Kansas |
| 1909 | Missouri |
| 1910 | Nebraska |
| 1911 | Iowa State; Nebraska |
| 1912 | Iowa State; Nebraska |
| 1913 | Missouri; Nebraska |
| 1914 | Nebraska |
| 1915 | Nebraska |
| 1916 | Nebraska |
| 1917 | Nebraska |
| 1918 | none |
| 1919 | Missouri |
| 1920 | Oklahoma |
| 1921 | Nebraska |
| 1922 | Nebraska |
| 1923 | Nebraska |
| 1924 | Missouri |
| 1925 | Missouri |
| 1926 | Oklahoma State |
| 1927 | Missouri |
| 1928 | Nebraska |
Big Six Conference
| 1929 | Nebraska |
| 1930 | Kansas |
| 1931 | Nebraska |
| 1932 | Nebraska |
| 1933 | Nebraska |
| 1934 | Kansas State |
| 1935 | Nebraska |
| 1936 | Nebraska |
| 1937 | Nebraska |
| 1938 | Oklahoma |
| 1939 | Missouri |
| 1940 | Nebraska |
| 1941 | Missouri |
| 1942 | Missouri |
| 1943 | Oklahoma |
| 1944 | Oklahoma |
| 1945 | Missouri |
| 1946 | Kansas; Oklahoma |
| 1947 | Kansas; Oklahoma |
Big Seven Conference
| 1948 | Oklahoma |
| 1949 | Oklahoma |
| 1950 | **Oklahoma** |
| 1951 | Oklahoma |
| 1952 | Oklahoma |
| 1953 | Oklahoma |
| 1954 | Oklahoma |
| 1955 | **Oklahoma** |
| 1956 | **Oklahoma** |
| 1957 | Oklahoma |
| 1958 | Oklahoma |
Big Eight Conference
| 1959 | Oklahoma |
| 1960^{†} | Missouri |
| 1961 | Colorado |
| 1962 | Oklahoma |
| 1963 | Nebraska |
| 1964 | Nebraska |
| 1965 | Nebraska |
| 1966 | Nebraska |
| 1967 | Oklahoma |
| 1968 | Kansas; Oklahoma |
| 1969 | Missouri; Nebraska |
| 1970 | **Nebraska** |
| 1971 | **Nebraska** |
| 1972^{‡} | Nebraska; Oklahoma |
| 1973 | Oklahoma |
| 1974 | **Oklahoma** |
| 1975 | **Oklahoma**; Nebraska |
| 1976 | Colorado; Oklahoma; Oklahoma State |
| 1977 | Oklahoma |
| 1978 | Nebraska; Oklahoma |
| 1979 | Oklahoma |
| 1980 | Oklahoma |
| 1981 | Nebraska |
| 1982 | Nebraska |
| 1983 | Nebraska |
| 1984 | Nebraska; Oklahoma |
| 1985 | **Oklahoma** |
| 1986 | Oklahoma |
| 1987 | Oklahoma |
| 1988 | Nebraska |
| 1989 | Colorado |
| 1990 | **Colorado** |
| 1991 | Colorado; Nebraska |
| 1992 | Nebraska |
| 1993 | Nebraska |
| 1994 | **Nebraska** |
| 1995 | **Nebraska** |

^{†} Kansas would have won the 1960 title, but after found to be using an ineligible player they were forced to forfeit their victories over Missouri and Colorado, which meant that Missouri was awarded the 1960 Big Eight title.
^{‡} Oklahoma initially won the 1972 title, but after it was found that they used ineligible players, they were penalized by the NCAA, though they did not force OU to forfeit games. The Big Eight asked them to forfeit three games and awarded the title to Nebraska, but Oklahoma still claims these wins and this title.

== Men's golf ==
The following are the MVIAA/Big Eight post-season conference champions from the 1921 through the 1996 season when the Big Eight was dissolved. In 1926 golf was dropped as a sponsored sport by the MVIAA and it wasn't picked up again until the 1935 season.

=== Championships ===
Men's golf championship summary
| School | Total titles | Years |
|---|---|---|
| Colorado | 3 | 1955 • 1956 • 1968 |
| Drake | 3 | 1921 • 1922 • 1923 |
| Grinnell | 0 | – |
| Iowa State | 3 | 1940 • 1947 • 1953 |
| Kansas | 5 | 1924 • 1925 • 1939 • 1947 • 1950 |
| Kansas State | 0 | – |
| Missouri | 2 | 1949 • 1984 |
| Nebraska | 2 | 1937 • 1938 |
| Oklahoma | 12 | 1935 • 1938 • 1941 • 1946 • 1947 • 1948 • 1951 • 1952 • 1955 • 1956 • 1957 • 1992 |
| Oklahoma State | 36 | 1958 • 1959 • 1960 • 1961 • 1962 • 1963 • 1964 • 1965 • 1966 • 1967 • 1969 • 1970 • 1971 • 1972 • 1973 • 1974 • 1975 • 1976 • 1977 • 1978 • 1979 • 1980 • 1981 • 1982 • 1983 • 1985 • 1986 • 1987 • 1988 • 1989 • 1990 • 1991 • 1993 • 1994 • 1995 • 1996 |
| Washington (St. Louis) | 0 | – |
**Shared championships are in italics.**

| Season | Champion(s) |
MVIAA
| 1921 | Drake |
| 1922 | Drake |
| 1923 | Drake |
| 1924 | Kansas |
| 1925 | Kansas |
| 1926^{†} | none |
| 1927^{†} | none |
| 1928^{†} | none |
Big Six Conference
| 1929^{†} | none |
| 1930^{†} | none |
| 1931^{†} | none |
| 1932^{†} | none |
| 1933^{†} | none |
| 1934^{†} | none |
| 1935 | Oklahoma |
| 1936 | Nebraska |
| 1937 | Nebraska |
| 1938 | Oklahoma |
| 1939 | Kansas |
| 1940 | Iowa State |
| 1941 | Oklahoma |
| 1942^{‡} | none |
| 1943^{‡} | none |
| 1944^{‡} | none |
| 1945^{‡} | none |
| 1946 | Oklahoma |
| 1947 | Kansas; Iowa State; Oklahoma |
Big Seven Conference
| 1948 | Oklahoma |
| 1949 | Missouri |
| 1950 | Kansas |
| 1951 | Oklahoma |
| 1952 | Oklahoma |
| 1953 | Iowa State |
| 1954 | Colorado |
| 1955 | Colorado; Oklahoma |
| 1956 | Oklahoma |
| 1957 | Oklahoma |
| 1958 | Oklahoma State |
Big Eight Conference
| 1959 | Oklahoma State |
| 1960 | Oklahoma State |
| 1961 | Oklahoma State |
| 1962 | Oklahoma State |
| 1963 | **Oklahoma State** |
| 1964 | Oklahoma State |
| 1965 | Oklahoma State |
| 1966 | Oklahoma State |
| 1967 | Oklahoma State |
| 1968 | Colorado |
| 1969 | Oklahoma State |
| 1970 | Oklahoma State |
| 1971 | Oklahoma State |
| 1972 | Oklahoma State |
| 1973 | Oklahoma State |
| 1974 | Oklahoma State |
| 1975 | Oklahoma State |
| 1976 | **Oklahoma State** |
| 1977 | Oklahoma State |
| 1978 | **Oklahoma State** |
| 1979 | Oklahoma State |
| 1980 | **Oklahoma State** |
| 1981 | Oklahoma State |
| 1982 | Oklahoma State |
| 1983 | **Oklahoma State** |
| 1984 | Missouri |
| 1985 | Oklahoma State |
| 1986 | Oklahoma State |
| 1987 | **Oklahoma State** |
| 1988 | Oklahoma State |
| 1989 | Oklahoma State |
| 1990 | Oklahoma State |
| 1991 | **Oklahoma State** |
| 1992 | Oklahoma |
| 1993 | Oklahoma State |
| 1994 | Oklahoma State |
| 1995 | **Oklahoma State** |
| 1996 | Oklahoma State |

^{†}Golf dropped as a sponsored sport by the conference.
^{‡}No conference meet held due to WWII.

== Women's golf ==
The following are the MVIAA/Big Eight post-season conference champions from the 1976 through the 1996 season when the Big Eight was dissolved.

=== Championships ===
Women's golf championship summary
| School | Total titles | Seasons |
|---|---|---|
| Colorado | 0 | – |
| Iowa State | 1 | 1993 |
| Kansas | 1 | 1990 |
| Kansas State | 0 | – |
| Missouri | 0 | – |
| Nebraska | 2 | 1976 • 1983 |
| Oklahoma | 3 | 1978 • 1981 • 1991 |
| Oklahoma State | 14 | 1977 • 1979 • 1980 • 1982 • 1984 • 1985 • 1986 • 1987 • 1988 • 1989 • 1992 • 1994 • 1995 • 1996 |

| Season | Champion(s) |
Big Eight Conference
| 1976 | Nebraska |
| 1977 | Oklahoma State |
| 1978 | Oklahoma |
| 1979 | Oklahoma State |
| 1980 | Oklahoma State |
| 1981 | Oklahoma |
| 1982 | Oklahoma State |
| 1983 | Nebraska |
| 1984 | Oklahoma State |
| 1985 | Oklahoma State |
| 1986 | Oklahoma State |
| 1987 | Oklahoma State |
| 1988 | Oklahoma State |
| 1989 | Oklahoma State |
| 1990 | Kansas |
| 1991 | Oklahoma |
| 1992 | Oklahoma State |
| 1993 | Iowa State |
| 1994 | Oklahoma State |
| 1995 | Oklahoma State |
| 1996 | Oklahoma State |

== Men's gymnastics ==
The following are the MVIAA/Big Eight post-season conference champions from the 1964 through the 1994 season. After Iowa State dropped men's gymnastics in 1994 the league was left with only two schools sponsoring the sport, as a result the league no longer sanctioned future championships.

=== Championships ===
Men's gymnastics championship summary
| School | Total titles | Years |
|---|---|---|
| Colorado | 1 | 1968 |
| Iowa State | 10 | 1965 • 1966 • 1967 • 1969 • 1970 • 1971 • 1972 • 1973 • 1974 • 1975 |
| Kansas | 0 | – |
| Kansas State | 0 | – |
| Nebraska | 13 | 1964 • 1976 • 1980 • 1982 • 1983 • 1985 • 1986 • 1988 • 1989 • 1990 • 1992 • 1993 • 1994 |
| Oklahoma | 7 | 1977 • 1978 • 1979 • 1981 • 1984 • 1987 • 1991 |

| Season | Champion(s) |
Big Eight Conference
| 1964 | Nebraska |
| 1965 | Iowa State |
| 1966 | Iowa State |
| 1967 | Iowa State |
| 1968 | Colorado |
| 1969 | Iowa State |
| 1970 | Iowa State |
| 1971 | **Iowa State** |
| 1972 | Iowa State |
| 1973 | **Iowa State** |
| 1974 | **Iowa State** |
| 1975 | Iowa State |
| 1976 | Nebraska |
| 1977 | **Oklahoma** |
| 1978 | **Oklahoma** |
| 1979 | Oklahoma |
| 1980 | **Nebraska** |
| 1981 | Oklahoma |
| 1982 | **Nebraska** |
| 1983 | **Nebraska** |
| 1984 | Oklahoma |
| 1985 | Nebraska |
| 1986 | Nebraska |
| 1987 | Oklahoma |
| 1988 | **Nebraska** |
| 1989 | Nebraska |
| 1990 | **Nebraska** |
| 1991 | **Oklahoma** |
| 1992 | Nebraska |
| 1993 | Nebraska |
| 1994 | **Nebraska** |

== Women's gymnastics ==
The following are the MVIAA/Big Eight post-season conference champions from the 1975 through the 1996 season when the Big Eight was dissolved.

=== Championships ===
Women's gymnastics championship summary
| School | Total titles | Seasons |
|---|---|---|
| Colorado | 1 | 1976 |
| Iowa State | 2 | 1975 • 1977 |
| Kansas | 0 | – |
| Missouri | 1 | 1992 |
| Nebraska | 12 | 1978 • 1979 • 1980 • 1982 • 1983 • 1987 • 1988 • 1989 • 1990 • 1994 • 1995 • 1996 |
| Oklahoma | 5 | 1984 • 1985 • 1986 • 1991 • 1993 |
| Oklahoma State | 1 | 1981 |

| Season | Champion(s) |
Big Eight Conference
| 1975 | Iowa State |
| 1976 | Colorado |
| 1977 | Iowa State |
| 1978 | Nebraska |
| 1979 | Nebraska |
| 1980 | Nebraska |
| 1981 | Oklahoma State |
| 1982 | Nebraska |
| 1983 | Nebraska |
| 1984 | Oklahoma |
| 1985 | Oklahoma |
| 1986 | Oklahoma |
| 1987 | Nebraska |
| 1988 | Nebraska |
| 1989 | Nebraska |
| 1990 | Nebraska |
| 1991 | Oklahoma |
| 1992 | Missouri |
| 1993 | Oklahoma |
| 1994 | Nebraska |
| 1995 | Nebraska |
| 1996 | Nebraska |

== Softball ==
The following are the MVIAA/Big Eight regular-season conference champions from the 1976 through the 1995 season when the Big Eight was dissolved.

=== Championships ===
Softball championship summary
| School | Total titles | Seasons |
|---|---|---|
| Colorado | 0 | – |
| Iowa State | 2 | 1976 • 1978 |
| Kansas | 2 | 1977 • 1979 |
| Kansas State | 0 | – |
| Missouri | 1 | 1983 |
| Nebraska | 6 | 1982 • 1984 • 1985 • 1986 • 1987 • 1988 |
| Oklahoma | 0 | – |
| Oklahoma State | 9 | 1980 • 1981 • 1989 • 1990 • 1991 • 1992 • 1993 • 1994 • 1995 |

| Season | Champion(s) |
Big Eight Conference
| 1976 | Iowa State |
| 1977 | Kansas |
| 1978 | Iowa State |
| 1979 | Kansas |
| 1980 | Oklahoma State |
| 1981 | Oklahoma State |
| 1982 | Nebraska |
| 1983 | Missouri |
| 1984 | Nebraska |
| 1985 | Nebraska |
| 1986 | Nebraska |
| 1987 | Nebraska |
| 1988 | Nebraska |
| 1989 | Oklahoma State |
| 1990 | Oklahoma State |
| 1991 | Oklahoma State |
| 1992 | Oklahoma State |
| 1993 | Oklahoma State |
| 1994 | Oklahoma State |
| 1995 | Oklahoma State |

== Men's swimming & diving ==
The following are the MVIAA/Big Eight post-season conference champions from the 1924 through the 1996 season when the Big Eight was dissolved.

=== Championships ===
Men's swimming & diving championship summary
| School | Total titles | Seasons |
|---|---|---|
| Colorado | 0 | – |
| Drake | 0 | – |
| Grinnell | 0 | – |
| Iowa State | 20 | 1929 • 1931 • 1932 • 1933 • 1934 • 1936 • 1938 • 1939 • 1940 • 1941 • 1942 • 1947 • 1948 • 1949 • 1951 • 1954* • 1967 • 1976 • 1977 • 1995 |
| Kansas | 10 | 1968 • 1969 • 1970 • 1971 • 1972 • 1973 • 1974 • 1975 • 1978 • 1979 |
| Kansas State | 0 | – |
| Missouri | 0 | – |
| Nebraska | 21 | 1930 • 1933 • 1935 • 1936 • 1937 • 1980 • 1981 • 1982 • 1983 • 1984 • 1985 • 1986 • 1987 • 1988 • 1989 • 1990 • 1991 • 1992 • 1993 • 1994 • 1996 |
| Oklahoma | 15 | 1950 • 1952 • 1953 • 1955 • 1956 • 1957 • 1958 • 1959 • 1960 • 1961 • 1962 • 1963 • 1964 • 1965 • 1966 |
| Oklahoma State | 0 | – |
| Washington (St. Louis) | 5 | 1924 • 1925 • 1926 • 1927 • 1928 |
**Shared championships are in italics.**

| Season | Champion(s) |
MVIAA
| 1924 | Washington (St. Louis) |
| 1925 | Washington (St. Louis) |
| 1926 | Washington (St. Louis) |
| 1927 | Washington (St. Louis) |
| 1928 | Washington (St. Louis) |
Big Six Conference
| 1929 | Iowa State |
| 1930 | Nebraska |
| 1931 | Iowa State |
| 1932 | Iowa State |
| 1933 | Iowa State Nebraska |
| 1934 | Iowa State |
| 1935 | Nebraska |
| 1936 | Iowa State Nebraska |
| 1937 | Nebraska |
| 1938 | Iowa State |
| 1939 | Iowa State |
| 1940 | Iowa State |
| 1941 | Iowa State |
| 1942 | Iowa State |
| 1943 | none |
| 1944 | none |
| 1945 | none |
| 1946 | none |
| 1947 | Iowa State |
Big Seven Conference
| 1948 | Iowa State |
| 1949 | Iowa State |
| 1950 | Oklahoma |
| 1951 | Iowa State |
| 1952 | Oklahoma |
| 1953 | Oklahoma |
| 1954 | Iowa State^{†} |
| 1955 | Oklahoma |
| 1956 | Oklahoma |
| 1957 | Oklahoma |
| 1958 | Oklahoma |
Big Eight Conference
| 1959 | Oklahoma |
| 1960 | Oklahoma |
| 1961 | Oklahoma |
| 1962 | Oklahoma |
| 1963 | Oklahoma |
| 1964 | Oklahoma |
| 1965 | Oklahoma |
| 1966 | Oklahoma |
| 1967 | Iowa State |
| 1968 | Kansas |
| 1969 | Kansas |
| 1970 | Kansas |
| 1971 | Kansas |
| 1972 | Kansas |
| 1973 | Kansas |
| 1974 | Kansas |
| 1975 | Kansas |
| 1976 | Iowa State |
| 1977 | Iowa State |
| 1978 | Kansas |
| 1979 | Kansas |
| 1980 | Nebraska |
| 1981 | Nebraska |
| 1982 | Nebraska |
| 1983 | Nebraska |
| 1984 | Nebraska |
| 1985 | Nebraska |
| 1986 | Nebraska |
| 1987 | Nebraska |
| 1988 | Nebraska |
| 1989 | Nebraska |
| 1990 | Nebraska |
| 1991 | Nebraska |
| 1992 | Nebraska |
| 1993 | Nebraska |
| 1994 | Nebraska |
| 1995 | Iowa State |
| 1996 | Nebraska |

^{†}Oklahoma was forced to forfeit the 1954 title for using an ineligible athlete, thus the title was awarded to Iowa State.

== Women's swimming & diving ==
The following are the MVIAA/Big Eight post-season conference champions from the 1974 through the 1996 season when the Big Eight was dissolved.

=== Championships ===
Women's swimming & diving championship summary
| School | Total titles | Seasons |
|---|---|---|
| Colorado | 0 | – |
| Iowa State | 1 | 1974 |
| Kansas | 14 | 1975 • 1976 • 1977 • 1978 • 1979 • 1980 • 1981 • 1982 • 1983 • 1984 • 1988 • 1989 • 1992 • 1993 |
| Kansas State | 0 | – |
| Missouri | 0 | – |
| Nebraska | 8 | 1985 • 1986 • 1987 • 1990 • 1991 • 1994 • 1995 • 1996 |
| Oklahoma | 0 | – |
| Oklahoma State | 0 | – |

| Season | Champion(s) |
Big Eight Conference
| 1974 | Iowa State |
| 1975 | Kansas |
| 1976 | Kansas |
| 1977 | Kansas |
| 1978 | Kansas |
| 1979 | Kansas |
| 1980 | Kansas |
| 1981 | Kansas |
| 1982 | Kansas |
| 1983 | Kansas |
| 1984 | Kansas |
| 1985 | Nebraska |
| 1986 | Nebraska |
| 1987 | Nebraska |
| 1988 | Kansas |
| 1989 | Kansas |
| 1990 | Nebraska |
| 1991 | Nebraska |
| 1992 | Kansas |
| 1993 | Kansas |
| 1994 | Nebraska |
| 1995 | Nebraska |
| 1996 | Nebraska |

== Men's tennis ==
The following are the MVIAA/Big Eight post-season conference champions from the 1912 through the 1996 season when the Big Eight was dissolved.

=== Championships ===
Men's tennis championship summary
| School | Total titles | Seasons |
|---|---|---|
| Colorado | 4 | 1953 • 1954 • 1956 • 1993 |
| Drake | 0 | – |
| Grinnell | 2 | 1927 • 1928 |
| Iowa State | 1 | 1946 |
| Kansas | 13 | 1916 • 1924 • 1931 • 1932 • 1933 • 1937 • 1948 • 1964 • 1987 • 1988 • 1994 • 1995 • 1996 |
| Kansas State | 0 | – |
| Missouri | 2 | 1913 • 1917 |
| Nebraska | 0 | – |
| Oklahoma | 35 | 1921 • 1922 • 1923 • 1925 • 1926 • 1929 • 1930 • 1935 • 1936 • 1938 • 1939 • 1940 • 1941 • 1947 • 1949 • 1950 • 1951 • 1952 • 1955 • 1957 • 1960 • 1965 • 1966 • 1967 • 1968 • 1969 • 1970 • 1971 • 1972 • 1973 • 1974 • 1976 • 1977 • 1982 • 1992 |
| Oklahoma State | 17 | 1958 • 1959 • 1961 • 1962 • 1963 • 1977 • 1978 • 1979 • 1980 • 1981 • 1983 • 1984 • 1985 • 1986 • 1989 • 1990 • 1991 |
| Washington (St. Louis) | 4 | 1912 • 1914 • 1915 • 1920 |
**Shared championships are in italics.**

| Season | Champion(s) |
MVIAA
| 1912 | Washington |
| 1913 | Missouri |
| 1914 | Washington |
| 1915 | Washington |
| 1916 | Kansas |
| 1917 | Missouri |
| 1918 | none |
| 1919 | none |
| 1920 | Washington |
| 1921 | Oklahoma |
| 1922 | Oklahoma |
| 1923 | Oklahoma |
| 1924 | Kansas |
| 1925 | Oklahoma |
| 1926 | Oklahoma |
| 1927 | Grinell |
| 1928 | Grinell |
Big Six Conference
| 1929 | Oklahoma |
| 1930 | Oklahoma |
| 1931 | Kansas |
| 1932 | Kansas |
| 1933 | Kansas |
| 1934 | none |
| 1935 | Oklahoma |
| 1936 | Oklahoma |
| 1937 | Kansas |
| 1938 | Oklahoma |
| 1939 | Oklahoma |
| 1940 | Oklahoma |
| 1941 | Oklahoma |
| 1942 | none |
| 1943 | none |
| 1944 | none |
| 1945 | none |
| 1946 | Iowa State |
| 1947 | Oklahoma |
Big Seven Conference
| 1948 | Kansas |
| 1949 | Oklahoma |
| 1950 | Oklahoma |
| 1951 | Oklahoma |
| 1952 | Oklahoma |
| 1953 | Colorado |
| 1954 | Colorado |
| 1955 | Oklahoma |
| 1956 | Colorado |
| 1957 | Oklahoma |
| 1958 | Oklahoma State |
Big Eight Conference
| 1959 | Oklahoma State |
| 1960 | Oklahoma |
| 1961 | Oklahoma State |
| 1962 | Oklahoma State |
| 1963 | Oklahoma State |
| 1964 | Kansas |
| 1965 | Kansas |
| 1966 | Oklahoma |
| 1967 | Oklahoma |
| 1968 | Oklahoma |
| 1969 | Oklahoma |
| 1970 | Oklahoma |
| 1971 | Oklahoma |
| 1972 | Oklahoma |
| 1973 | Oklahoma |
| 1974 | Oklahoma |
| 1975 | Missouri |
| 1976 | Oklahoma |
| 1977 | Oklahoma; Oklahoma State |
| 1978 | Oklahoma State |
| 1979 | Oklahoma State |
| 1980 | Oklahoma State |
| 1981 | Oklahoma State |
| 1982 | Oklahoma |
| 1983 | Oklahoma State |
| 1984 | Oklahoma State |
| 1985 | Oklahoma State |
| 1986 | Oklahoma State |
| 1987 | Kansas |
| 1988 | Kansas |
| 1989 | Oklahoma State |
| 1990 | Oklahoma State |
| 1991 | Oklahoma State |
| 1992 | Oklahoma |
| 1993 | Colorado |
| 1994 | Kansas |
| 1995 | Kansas |
| 1996 | Kansas |

== Women's tennis ==
The following are the MVIAA/Big Eight post-season conference champions from the 1975 through the 1996 season when the Big Eight was dissolved.

=== Championships ===
Women's tennis championship summary
| School | Total titles | Seasons |
|---|---|---|
| Colorado | 0 | – |
| Iowa State | 0 | – |
| Kansas | 5 | 1992 • 1993 • 1994 • 1995 • 1996 |
| Kansas State | 0 | – |
| Missouri | 0 | – |
| Nebraska | 2 | 1977 • 1978 |
| Oklahoma | 3 | 1976 • 1978 • 1979 |
| Oklahoma State | 12 | 1980 • 1981 • 1982 • 1983 • 1984 • 1985 • 1986 • 1987 • 1988 • 1989 • 1990 • 1991 |
**Shared championships are in italics.**

| Season | Champion(s) |
Big Eight Conference
| 1975 | Oklahoma |
| 1976^{†} | Oklahoma |
| 1977 | Nebraska |
| 1978 | Oklahoma; Nebraska |
| 1979 | Oklahoma |
| 1980 | Oklahoma State |
| 1981 | Oklahoma State |
| 1982 | Oklahoma State |
| 1983 | Oklahoma State |
| 1984 | Oklahoma State |
| 1985 | Oklahoma State |
| 1986 | Oklahoma State |
| 1987 | Oklahoma State |
| 1988 | Oklahoma State |
| 1989 | Oklahoma State |
| 1990 | Oklahoma State |
| 1991 | Oklahoma State |
| 1992^{†} | Kansas |
| 1993^{†} | Kansas |
| 1994 | Kansas |
| 1995 | Kansas |
| 1996 | Kansas |

^{†}Denotes that no postseason meet took place and the champion was decided by regular-season results.

== Men's track & field ==
The following are the MVIAA/Big Eight post-season champions from the 1908 through the 1996 season when the Big Eight was dissolved. Between the 1909 and 1924 seasons, the conference invited non-member schools to participate in the outdoor meets.

=== Championships ===
Men's track & field championships summary
| School | Total titles | Indoor | Outdoor |
|---|---|---|---|
| Chicago | 1 | 0 | 1 |
| Colorado | 0 | 0 | 0 |
| Drake | 0 | 0 | 0 |
| Grinnell | 0 | 0 | 0 |
| Iowa | 0 | 0 | 0 |
| Iowa State | 21 | 8 | 13 |
| Kansas | 58 | 26 | 32 |
| Kansas State | 4 | 3 | 1 |
| Missouri | 23 | 8 | 15 |
| Nebraska | 47 | 26 | 21 |
| Oklahoma | 10 | 5 | 5 |
| Oklahoma State | 5 | 0 | 5 |

| Season | Indoor | Outdoor |
MVIAA
| 1908 | – | Iowa State |
| 1909 | – | Grinnell^{†} |
| 1910 | – | Kansas |
| 1911 | – | Missouri |
| 1912 | – | Missouri |
| 1913 | – | Missouri |
| 1914 | – | Chicago |
| 1915 | – | Missouri |
| 1916 | – | Missouri |
| 1917 | – | Missouri |
| 1918 | – | Missouri |
| 1919 | – | Kansas State |
| 1920 | – | Missouri |
| 1921 | – | Nebraska |
| 1922 | Kansas | Nebraska |
| 1923 | Kansas | Nebraska |
| 1924 | Missouri | Nebraska |
| 1925 | Nebraska | Missouri |
| 1926 | Nebraska | Nebraska |
| 1927 | Oklahoma | Kansas |
| 1928 | Oklahoma | Kansas |
Big Six Conference
| 1929 | Oklahoma | Nebraska |
| 1930 | Nebraska | Kansas |
| 1931 | Nebraska | Kansas |
| 1932 | Nebraska | Nebraska |
| 1933 | Oklahoma | Nebraska |
| 1934 | Kansas | Kansas |
| 1935 | Kansas State | Oklahoma |
| 1936 | Nebraska | Nebraska |
| 1937 | Nebraska | Nebraska |
| 1938 | Nebraska | Missouri |
| 1939 | Missouri | Nebraska |
| 1940 | Nebraska | Nebraska |
| 1941 | Nebraska | Nebraska |
| 1942 | Nebraska | Nebraska |
| 1943 | Missouri | Missouri |
| 1944 | Iowa State | Iowa State |
| 1945 | Iowa State | Iowa State |
| 1946 | Iowa State | Kansas |
| 1947 | Missouri | Missouri |
Big Seven Conference
| 1948 | Missouri | Missouri |
| 1949 | Nebraska | Missouri |
| 1950 | Kansas | Nebraska |
| 1951 | Nebraska | Missouri |
| 1952 | Kansas | Kansas |
| 1953 | Kansas | Kansas |
| 1954 | Kansas | Kansas |
| 1955 | Kansas | Kansas |
| 1956 | Kansas | Kansas |
| 1957 | Kansas | Kansas |
| 1958 | Kansas | Kansas |
Big Eight Conference
| **1959** | Kansas | **Kansas** |
| **1960** | Oklahoma | **Kansas** |
| 1961 | Kansas | Oklahoma |
| 1962 | Kansas | Oklahoma |
| 1963 | Nebraska | Kansas |
| 1964 | Missouri | Kansas |
| **1965** | **Missouri** | Kansas |
| **1966** | **Kansas** | Nebraska |
| 1967 | Kansas | Kansas |
| 1968 | Kansas | Kansas |
| **1969** | **Kansas** | Kansas |
| **1970** | **Kansas** | **Kansas** |
| **1971** | **Kansas** | Kansas |
| 1972 | Nebraska | Kansas |
| 1973 | Nebraska | Kansas |
| 1974 | Kansas State | Kansas |
| 1975 | Kansas | Kansas |
| 1976 | Kansas State | Kansas |
| 1977 | Kansas | Oklahoma^{‡} |
| 1978 | Nebraska^{¥} | Oklahoma |
| 1979 | Missouri | Kansas |
| 1980 | Kansas | Kansas |
| 1981 | Kansas | Iowa State |
| 1982 | Kansas | Kansas |
| 1983 | Kansas | Iowa State |
| 1984 | Iowa State | Iowa State |
| 1985 | Nebraska | Iowa State |
| 1986 | Iowa State | Iowa State |
| 1987 | Nebraska | Nebraska |
| 1988 | Nebraska | Iowa State |
| 1989 | Nebraska | Nebraska |
| 1990 | Iowa State | Nebraska |
| 1991 | Iowa State | Iowa State |
| 1992 | Nebraska | Iowa State |
| 1993 | Iowa State | Iowa State |
| 1994 | Nebraska | Iowa State |
| 1995 | Nebraska | Nebraska |
| 1996 | Nebraska | Nebraska |

^{†}Denotes school was not a member of the conference but would later join.
^{‡}Kansas was forced to forfeit the 1977 title for using an ineligible athlete, thus the title was awarded to Oklahoma.
^{¥}Kansas was forced to forfeit the 1978 indoor title for using an ineligible athlete, thus the title was awarded to Nebraska.

== Women's track & field ==
The following are the MVIAA/Big Eight post-season conference champions from the 1974 through the 1996 season when the Big Eight was dissolved.

=== Championships ===
Women's track & field championships summary
| School | Total titles | Indoor | Outdoor |
|---|---|---|---|
| Colorado | 1 | 0 | 1 |
| Iowa State | 9 | 3 | 6 |
| Kansas | 0 | 0 | 0 |
| Kansas State | 1 | 1 | 0 |
| Missouri | 0 | 0 | 0 |
| Nebraska | 33 | 17 | 16 |
| Oklahoma | 0 | 0 | 0 |
| Oklahoma State | 0 | 0 | 0 |

| Season | Indoor | Outdoor |
Big Eight Conference
| 1974 | – | Iowa State |
| 1975 | – | Iowa State |
| 1976 | Kansas State | Iowa State |
| 1977 | Iowa State | Iowa State |
| 1978 | Iowa State | Iowa State |
| 1979 | Iowa State | Iowa State |
| 1980 | Nebraska | Nebraska |
| 1981 | Nebraska | Nebraska |
| 1982 | Nebraska | Nebraska |
| 1983 | **Nebraska** | Nebraska |
| 1984 | **Nebraska** | Nebraska |
| 1985 | Nebraska | Nebraska |
| 1986 | Nebraska | Nebraska |
| 1987 | Nebraska | Nebraska |
| 1988 | Nebraska | Nebraska |
| 1989 | Nebraska | Nebraska |
| 1990 | Nebraska | Nebraska |
| 1991 | Nebraska | Nebraska |
| 1992 | Nebraska | Nebraska |
| 1993 | Nebraska | Nebraska |
| 1994 | Nebraska | Nebraska |
| 1995 | Nebraska | Nebraska |
| 1996 | Nebraska | Colorado |

== Volleyball ==
The following are the MVIAA/Big Eight regular-season and post-season conference champions from the 1976 through the 1995 season when the Big Eight was dissolved.

=== Championships ===
Volleyball championship summary
| School | Total titles | Regular season | Tournament |
|---|---|---|---|
| Colorado | 3 | 1 | 2 |
| Iowa State | 0 | 0 | 0 |
| Kansas | 0 | 0 | 0 |
| Kansas State | 0 | 0 | 0 |
| Missouri | 0 | 0 | 0 |
| Nebraska | 36 | 19 | 17 |
| Oklahoma | 1 | 0 | 1 |
| Oklahoma State | 0 | 0 | 0 |

| Season | Regular season | Tournament |
Big Eight Conference
| 1976 | Nebraska | Nebraska |
| 1977 | Nebraska | Nebraska |
| 1978 | Nebraska | Nebraska |
| 1979 | Nebraska | Nebraska |
| 1980 | Nebraska | Nebraska |
| 1981 | Nebraska | Nebraska |
| 1982 | Nebraska | Nebraska |
| 1983 | Nebraska | Nebraska |
| 1984 | Nebraska | Nebraska |
| 1985 | Nebraska | Nebraska |
| 1986 | Nebraska | Nebraska |
| 1987 | Nebraska | Oklahoma |
| 1988 | Nebraska | Nebraska |
| 1989 | Nebraska | Nebraska |
| 1990 | Nebraska | Nebraska |
| 1991 | Nebraska | Nebraska |
| 1992 | Nebraska | Colorado |
| 1993 | Colorado | Colorado |
| 1994 | Nebraska | Nebraska |
| 1995 | Nebraska | Nebraska |

== Wrestling ==
The following are the MVIAA/Big Eight post-season conference champions from the 1924 through the 1996 season when the Big Eight was dissolved. Kansas, Kansas State, and Colorado all eliminated their wrestling programs before the Big Eight conference dissolved.

=== Championships ===
Wrestling championship summary
| School | Total titles | Seasons |
|---|---|---|
| Colorado | 0 | – |
| Iowa State | 14 | 1929 • 1933 • 1937 • 1941 • 1947 • 1958 • 1970 • 1976 • 1977 • 1979 • 1980 • 1982 • 1987 • 1993 |
| Kansas | 0 | – |
| Kansas State | 3 | 1931 • 1939 • 1940 |
| Missouri | 0 | – |
| Nebraska | 3 | 1924 • 1949 • 1995 |
| Oklahoma | 21 | 1930 • 1932 • 1934 • 1935 • 1936 • 1938 • 1948 • 1950 • 1951 • 1952 • 1953 • 1954 • 1955 • 1956 • 1957 • 1960 • 1967 • 1968 • 1981 • 1985 • 1986 |
| Oklahoma State | 28 | 1925 • 1926 • 1927 • 1928 • 1959 • 1961 • 1962 • 1963 • 1964 • 1965 • 1966 • 1968 • 1969 • 1971 • 1972 • 1973 • 1974 • 1975 • 1978 • 1983 • 1984 • 1987 • 1988 • 1989 • 1990 • 1991 • 1992* • 1994 |
| Washington (St. Louis) | 0 | – |
**Shared championships are in italics.**

| Season | Champion(s) |
MVIAA
| 1924 | Nebraska |
| 1925 | Oklahoma State |
| 1926 | Oklahoma State |
| 1927 | Oklahoma State |
| 1928 | **Oklahoma State** |
Big Six Conference
| 1929 | Iowa State |
| 1930 | Oklahoma |
| 1931 | Kansas State |
| 1932 | Oklahoma |
| 1933 | **Iowa State** |
| 1934 | Oklahoma |
| 1935 | Oklahoma |
| 1936 | **Oklahoma** |
| 1937 | Iowa State |
| 1938 | Oklahoma |
| 1939 | Kansas State |
| 1940 | Kansas State |
| 1941 | Iowa State |
| 1942 | none |
| 1943 | none |
| 1944 | none |
| 1945 | none |
| 1946 | none |
| 1947 | Iowa State |
Big Seven Conference
| 1948 | Oklahoma |
| 1949 | Nebraska |
| 1950 | Oklahoma |
| 1951 | **Oklahoma** |
| 1952 | **Oklahoma** |
| 1953 | Oklahoma |
| 1954 | Oklahoma |
| 1955 | Oklahoma |
| 1956 | Oklahoma |
| 1957 | **Oklahoma** |
| 1958 | Iowa State |
Big Eight Conference
| 1959 | **Oklahoma State** |
| 1960 | **Oklahoma** |
| 1961 | **Oklahoma State** |
| 1962 | **Oklahoma State** |
| 1963 | Oklahoma State |
| 1964 | **Oklahoma State** |
| 1965 | Oklahoma State |
| 1966 | **Oklahoma State** |
| 1967 | Oklahoma |
| 1968 | **Oklahoma State**; Oklahoma |
| 1969 | Oklahoma State |
| 1970 | **Iowa State** |
| 1971 | **Oklahoma State** |
| 1972 | Oklahoma State |
| 1973 | Oklahoma State |
| 1974 | Oklahoma State |
| 1975 | Oklahoma State |
| 1976 | Iowa State |
| 1977 | **Iowa State** |
| 1978 | Oklahoma State |
| 1979 | Iowa State |
| 1980 | Iowa State |
| 1981 | Oklahoma |
| 1982 | Iowa State |
| 1983 | Oklahoma State |
| 1984 | Oklahoma State |
| 1985 | Oklahoma |
| 1986 | Oklahoma |
| 1987 | **Iowa State**; Oklahoma State |
| 1988 | Oklahoma State |
| 1989 | **Oklahoma State** |
| 1990 | **Oklahoma State** |
| 1991 | Oklahoma State |
| 1992 | Oklahoma State^{†} |
| 1993 | Iowa State |
| 1994 | **Oklahoma State** |
| 1995 | Nebraska |
| 1996 | Oklahoma State |

^{†}Oklahoma State did not accept the trophy in 1992 in order to lessen any consequences stemming from an NCAA investigation of improper payments made to its student athletes.
