= Oklahoma Sooners men's basketball statistical leaders =

The Oklahoma Sooners men's basketball statistical leaders are individual statistical leaders of the Oklahoma Sooners men's basketball program in various categories, including points, assists, blocks, rebounds, and steals. Within those areas, the lists identify single-game, single-season, and career leaders. As of the next college basketball season in 2024–25, the Sooners represent the University of Oklahoma in the NCAA Division I Southeastern Conference.

Oklahoma began competing in intercollegiate basketball in 1907. However, the school's record book does not generally list records from before the 1950s, as records from before this period are often incomplete and inconsistent. Since scoring was much lower in this era, and teams played much fewer games during a typical season, it is likely that few or no players from this era would appear on these lists anyway.

The NCAA did not officially record assists as a stat until the 1983–84 season, and blocks and steals until the 1985–86 season, but Oklahoma's record books includes players in these stats before these seasons. These lists are updated through the end of the 2020–21 season.

== Scoring ==
Career
Rk	Player	Points	Seasons
1	Wayman Tisdale	2,661	1982–83 1983–84 1984–85
2	Buddy Hield	2,291	2012–13 2013–14 2014–15 2015–16
3	Jeff Webster	2,281	1989–90 1990–91 1991–92 1992–93 1993–94
4	Tim McCalister	2,275	1983–84 1984–85 1985–86 1986–87
5	Darryl Kennedy	2,097	1983–84 1984–85 1985–86 1986–87
6	Stacey King	2,008	1985–86 1986–87 1987–88 1988–89
7	Ryan Minor	1,946	1992–93 1993–94 1994–95 1995–96
8	Hollis Price	1,821	1999–00 2000–01 2001–02 2002–03
9	Alvan Adams	1,707	1972–73 1973–74 1974–75
10	Eduardo Najera	1,646	1996–97 1997–98 1998–99 1999–00

Season
Rk	Player	Points	Season
1	Wayman Tisdale	932	1984–85
2	Buddy Hield	925	2015–16
3	Wayman Tisdale	919	1983–84
4	Trae Young	876	2017–18
5	Stacey King	869	1987–88
6	Stacey King	859	1988–89
7	Harvey Grant	816	1987–88
8	Wayman Tisdale	810	1982–83
9	Blake Griffin	794	2008–09
10	Ryan Minor	756	1994–95

Single game
Rk	Player	Points	Season	Opponent
1	Wayman Tisdale	61	1983–84	UT San Antonio
2	Brent Price	56	1990–91	Loyola Marymount
3	Wayman Tisdale	55	1984–85	Southwestern (Texas)
4	Wayman Tisdale	51	1982–83	Abilene Christian
5	Trae Young	48	2017–18	Oklahoma State
	Stacey King	48	1988–89	UNLV
7	Buddy Hield	46	2015–16	Kansas
	Wayman Tisdale	46	1982–83	Iowa State
9	Trae Young	44	2017–18	Baylor
	Jeff Webster	44	1993–94	SMU
	Tim McCalister	44	1985–86	Brigham Young
	Wayman Tisdale	44	1982–83	Hawaii

== Rebounds ==
Career
Rk	Player	Rebounds	Seasons
1	Wayman Tisdale	1,048	1982–83 1983–84 1984–85
2	Darryl Kennedy	954	1983–84 1984–85 1985–86 1986–87
3	Alvan Adams	938	1972–73 1973–74 1974–75
4	Ryan Spangler	929	2013–14 2014–15 2015–16
5	Al Beal	917	1976–77 1977–78 1978–79 1979–80
6	Eduardo Najera	910	1996–97 1997–98 1998–99 1999–00
7	Garfield Heard	830	1967–68 1968–69 1969–70
8	Stacey King	825	1985–86 1986–87 1987–88 1988–89
9	David Johnson	810	1983–84 1984–85 1985–86 1986–87
10	Blake Griffin	805	2007–08 2008–09

Season
Rk	Player	Rebounds	Season
1	Blake Griffin	504	2008–09
2	Wayman Tisdale	378	1984–85
3	Harvey Grant	365	1987–88
4	Alvan Adams	346	1974–75
5	Wayman Tisdale	341	1982–83
6	Harvey Grant	365	1986–87
7	Garfield Heard	337	1969–70
8	Ryan Spangler	334	2015–16
9	Stacey King	332	1987–88
	Stacey King	332	1988–89

Single game
Rk	Player	Rebounds	Season	Opponent
1	Alvan Adams	28	1972–73	Indiana State
2	Don Sidle	27	1966–67	TCU
3	Alvan Adams	25	1974–75	Iowa State
4	Blake Griffin	23	2008–09	Texas Tech
	Stacey King	23	1988–89	Loyola Marymount
	Harvey Grant	23	1987–88	Loyola-Chicago
	Paul Courty	23	1946–47	Baylor
8	Ernie Abercrombie	22	1995–96	Mississippi State
	Wayman Tisdale	22	1983–84	UT San Antonio
	Al Beal	22	1978–79	Kansas
	Clifford Ray	22	1967–68	Colorado

== Assists ==
Career
Rk	Player	Assists	Seasons
1	Terry Evans	651	1989–90 1990–91 1991–92 1992–93
2	Tim McCalister	628	1983–84 1984–85 1985–86 1986–87
3	Bo Overton	517	1979–80 1980–81 1981–82 1982–83
4	Ricky Grace	471	1986–87 1987–88
	Jordan Woodard	471	2013–14 2014–15 2015–16 2016–17
6	Mookie Blaylock	465	1987–88 1988–89
7	Hollis Price	462	1999–00 2000–01 2001–02 2002–03
8	Jan Pannell	449	1981–82 1982–83 1983–84
9	John Ontjes	398	1993–94 1994–95
10	John McCullough	381	1975–76 1976–77 1977–78 1978–79

Season
Rk	Player	Assists	Season
1	Ricky Grace	280	1987–88
2	Trae Young	279	2017–18
3	Jan Pannell	240	1983–84
4	Mookie Blaylock	233	1988–89
5	Bo Overton	221	1982–83
6	John Ontjes	217	1994–95
7	Terrell Everett	199	2005–06
8	Anthony Bowie	196	1984–85
9	Brent Price	192	1990–91
10	Ricky Grace	191	1986–87

Single game
Rk	Player	Assists	Season	Opponent
1	Trae Young	22	2017–18	Northwestern State
2	Michael Johnson	18	1997–98	North Texas
	Jan Pannell	18	1982–83	Oklahoma City
4	Bo Overton	17	1982–83	Kansas State
5	Terry Evans	16	1990–91	Loyola Marymount
6	Terrell Everett	15	2005–06	Baylor
	Terry Evans	15	1992–93	Florida A&M
	Terry Evans	15	1991–92	Nebraska
	Terry Evans	15	1990–91	VCU
10	Trae Young	14	2017–18	Texas
	Trae Young	14	2017–18	TCU
	John Ontjes	14	1994–95	Alabama State
	Brent Price	14	1990–91	St. Joseph’s College
	Ricky Grace	14	1987–88	Oral Roberts
	Ricky Grace	14	1987–88	Centenary
	Jan Pannell	14	1983–84	Kansas

== Steals ==
NCAA Division I record

Career
Rk	Player	Steals	Seasons
1	Mookie Blaylock	281	1987–88 1988–89
2	Terry Evans	265	1989–90 1990–91 1991–92 1992–93
3	Tim McCalister	258	1983–84 1984–85 1985–86 1986–87
4	Hollis Price	224	1999–00 2000–01 2001–02 2002–03
5	Eduardo Najera	193	1996–97 1997–98 1998–99 1999–00
6	Ryan Minor	189	1992–93 1993–94 1994–95 1995–96
7	Jordan Woodard	186	2013–14 2014–15 2015–16 2016–17
8	Ricky Grace	178	1986–87 1987–88
9	Brent Price	177	1990–91 1991–92
10	Buddy Hield	168	2012–13 2013–14 2014–15 2015–16

Season
Rk	Player	Steals	Season
1	Mookie Blaylock	150	1987–88
2	Mookie Blaylock	131	1988–89
3	Ricky Grace	103	1987–88
4	Terry Evans	97	1992–93
	Brent Price	97	1990–91
6	Tim McCalister	90	1984–85
7	Tim McCalister	87	1985–86
8	Tim McCalister	81	1986–87
9	Brent Price	80	1991–92
10	Ricky Grace	75	1986–87

Single game
Rk	Player	Steals	Season	Opponent
1	Mookie Blaylock	13	1988–89	Loyola Marymount
	Mookie Blaylock	13	1987–88	Centenary

== Blocks ==
Career
Rk	Player	Blocks	Seasons
1	Khadeem Lattin	235	2014–15 2015–16 2016–17 2017–18
2	Al Beal	230	1976–77 1977–78 1978–79 1979–80
3	Stacey King	228	1985–86 1986–87 1987–88 1988–89
4	Wayman Tisdale	209	1982–83 1983–84 1984–85
5	Johnnie Gilbert	132	2000–01 2001–02 2002–03 2003–04 2004–05
6	Jamuni McNeace	117	2015–16 2016–17 2017–18 2018–19
7	Ryan Humphrey	114	1997–98 1998–99
8	Jabahri Brown	104	2001–02 2002–03 2003–04
	Taj Gray	104	2004–05 2005–06
10	Longar Longar	103	2004–05 2005–06 2006–07 2007–08

Season
Rk	Player	Blocks	Season
1	Stacey King	103	1987–88
2	Wayman Tisdale	82	1982–83
3	Khadeem Lattin	77	2015–16
4	Wayman Tisdale	75	1983–84
	Stacey King	75	1988–89
6	Khadeem Lattin	66	2016–17
7	Jackie Jones	64	1989–90
8	Ryan Humphrey	61	1998–99
	Khadeem Lattin	61	2017–18
10	James Mayden	60	1994–95

Single game
Rk	Player	Blocks	Season	Opponent
1	Jackie Jones	9	1989–90	Texas
