= Eurocup Basketball 2012–13 Regular Season Group G =

Standings and Results for Group G of the Regular Season phase of the 2012–13 Eurocup basketball tournament.

== Standings ==
All times are CET (UTC+1).

Key to colors
Top two teams advance to Last 16

	Team	Pld	W	L	PF	PA	Diff	Tie-break
1.	(Russia) BC Spartak Saint Petersburg	6	6	0	468	389	+79	
2.	(Germany) Ratiopharm Ulm	6	3	3	476	457	+19	1–1 (+20)
3.	(France) Cholet Basket	6	3	3	444	456	–12	1–1 (–20)
4.	(Croatia) KK Cibona	6	0	6	414	500	–86	

=== Game 1 ===
7 November 2012
18:00

Report

KK Cibona (Croatia)	56–64	(Russia) BC Spartak Saint Petersburg
Scoring by quarter: 13–17, 17–16, 19–17, 7–14
Pts: Strawberry 13; Rebs: Žižić 7 Asts: Carter, Kovačević 3		Pts: Wright, Carter 13; Rebs: Beverley 9 Asts: Strēlnieks, Wright, Beverley, Dmitriev 2

Dražen Petrović Basketball Hall, Zagreb
Attendance: 1,500
Referees: Carmelo Paternico (ITA), Rüştü Nuran (TUR), Oscar Perea (ESP)

7 November 2012
20:00

Report

Cholet Basket (France)	71–93	(Germany) Ratiopharm Ulm
Scoring by quarter: 21–32, 15–19, 12–22, 23–20
Pts: Everett 14; Rebs: Goree 6 Asts: Everett 6		Pts: Ray 25; Rebs: Bryant 12; Asts: Günther 5

La Meilleraie, Cholet
Attendance: 5,082
Referees: Miguel Angel Perez Niz (ESP), Anna Cardus (ESP), Gentian Cici (ALB)

=== Game 2 ===
14 November 2012
17:00

Report

BC Spartak Saint Petersburg (Russia)	69–60	(France) Cholet Basket
Scoring by quarter: 8–13, 23–19, 16–16, 22–12
Pts: Beverley 21; Rebs: Beverley 6 Asts: Mavrokefalidis 5		Pts: Goree 15; Rebs: Everett 9 Asts: Everett 6

Yubileyny Sports Palace, Saint Petersburg
Attendance: 1,100
Referees: Sasa Pukl (SLO), Jasmina Juras (SRB), Oskars Lucis (LAT)

14 November 2012
20:00

Report

Ratiopharm Ulm (Germany)	83–68	(Croatia) KK Cibona
Scoring by quarter: 28–19, 22–15, 16–18, 17–16
Pts: Schwethelm 22; Rebs: Theis, Watts 7 Asts: Five players 2		Pts: Strawberry 18; Rebs: Strawberry 7 Asts: Carter 3

Arena Ulm/Neu-Ulm, Neu-Ulm
Attendance: 5,600
Referees: Grzegorz Ziemblicki (POL), Nicola Maestre (FRA), Petros Papapetrou (GRE)

=== Game 3 ===
20 November 2012
18:30

Report

KK Cibona (Croatia)	90–95	(France) Cholet Basket
Scoring by quarter: 17–21, 19–26, 28–22, 26–26
Pts: Kus, Žižić 24; Rebs: Žižić 7 Asts: Kus 6		Pts: Goree 20; Rebs: Goree, Bryant 7 Asts: Everett 11

Dražen Petrović Basketball Hall, Zagreb
Attendance: 700
Referees: Seffi Shemmesh (ISR), Oliver Krause (GER), Sergiy Zashchuk (UKR)

21 November 2012
16:00

Report

BC Spartak Saint Petersburg (Russia)	89–71	(Germany) Ratiopharm Ulm
Scoring by quarter: 26–23, 22–18, 24–17, 17–13
Pts: Carter 24; Rebs: Dragičević 6 Asts: Wright 11		Pts: Ray, Watts 14; Rebs: Watts 5 Asts: Ray, Jeter 4

Yubileyny Sports Palace, Saint Petersburg
Attendance: 700
Referees: Marek Cmikiewicz (POL), Petar Obradovic (BIH), Tomislav Vovk (CRO)

=== Game 4 ===
28 November 2012
20:00

Report

Cholet Basket (France)	79–59	(Croatia) KK Cibona
Scoring by quarter: 26–15, 12–13, 29–10, 12–21
Pts: Obasohan 19; Rebs: Obasohan 7 Asts: Everett 9		Pts: Hamilton 12; Rebs: Strawberry 8 Asts: Kus 5

La Meilleraie, Cholet
Attendance: 3,500
Referees: Luis Lopes (POR), Boris Shulga (UKR), Renaud Geller (BEL)

28 November 2012
20:00

Report

Ratiopharm Ulm (Germany)	74–77	(Russia) BC Spartak Saint Petersburg
Scoring by quarter: 16–15, 16–16, 17–19, 25–27
Pts: Ray 15; Rebs: Bryant 7 Asts: Jeter 3		Pts: Mavrokefalidis 19; Rebs: Dragičević 7 Asts: Wright 4

Arena Ulm/Neu-Ulm, Neu-Ulm
Attendance: 5,350
Referees: Sreten Radovic (CRO), Zdravko Rutesic (MNE), Regis Bardera (FRA)

=== Game 5 ===
5 December 2012
16:00

Report

BC Spartak Saint Petersburg (Russia)	93–60	(Croatia) KK Cibona
Scoring by quarter: 26–14, 25–9, 22–17, 20–20
Pts: Zavoruev 15; Rebs: Mavrokefalidis 7 Asts: Carter 5		Pts: Mašić, Hamilton, Kovačević 10; Rebs: Hamilton 5 Asts: Marčinković 5

Yubileyny Sports Palace, Saint Petersburg
Attendance: 1,000
Referees: Borys Ryzhyk (UKR), Apostolos Kalpakas (SWE), Ingus Baumanis (LAT)

5 December 2012
20:00

Report

Ratiopharm Ulm (Germany)	69–71	(France) Cholet Basket
Scoring by quarter: 15–21, 14–17, 22–12, 18–21
Pts: Bryant 24; Rebs: Bryant 10; Asts: Günther 5		Pts: Goree, Bryant 12; Rebs: Jomby 8 Asts: Everett 5

Arena Ulm/Neu-Ulm, Neu-Ulm
Attendance: 4,650
Referees: Paolo Taurino (ITA), Tomas Jasevicius (LTU), Sergio Silva (POR)

=== Game 6 ===
12 December 2012
20:00

Report

Cholet Basket (France)	68–76	(Russia) BC Spartak Saint Petersburg
Scoring by quarter: 20–27, 18–15, 19–13, 11–21
Pts: Obasohan 19; Rebs: Bryant 7 Asts: Slaughter, Goree 3		Pts: Carter, Beverley, Mavrokefalidis 15; Rebs: Wright, Mavrokefalidis 7 Asts: Wright 10

La Meilleraie, Cholet
Attendance: 4,506
Referees: Grzegorz Ziemblicki (POL), Robert Vyklicky (CZE), Moritz Reiter (GER)

12 December 2012
20:00

Report

KK Cibona (Croatia)	81–86	(Germany) Ratiopharm Ulm
Scoring by quarter: 27–23, 21–14, 23–20, 10–29
Pts: Zubčić 21; Rebs: Hamilton 6 Asts: Strawberry 4		Pts: Esterkamp 15; Rebs: Bryant 7 Asts: Esterkamp 4

Dražen Petrović Basketball Hall, Zagreb
Attendance: 1,500
Referees: Tolga Sahin (ITA), Francisco Arana (ESP), Miroslav Tomov (BUL)
