= 2022 Oklahoma Sooners women's gymnastics team =

College gymnastics team season

2022 Oklahoma Sooners women's gymnastics

National Champion Big 12 tournament champion
- Conference: Big 12 Conference
- Record: 31–2 (1–0 Big 12)
- Head coach: K.J. Kindler (17th season)
- Assistant coaches: Lou Ball (17th season); Tom Haley (17th season)
- Home arena: Lloyd Noble Center

The 2022 Oklahoma Sooners women's gymnastics team represented the University of Oklahoma during the 2021 NCAA Division I women's gymnastics. The Sooners were led by K.J. Kindler in her sixteenth season, and played their home meets at Lloyd Noble Center in Norman, Oklahoma. They competed in the Big 12 Conference, where they finished the season with a 31–2–0 record.

Oklahoma won their fifth national title with a score of 198.2000.

== Schedule ==
Date	Time	Opponent	Rank	Site	TV	Result
January 9	1:45 p.m.	No. 6 Alabama*	No. 3	Lloyd Noble Center; Norman, OK	ESPN	W 197.400–195.875
January 14	8:30 p.m.	at No. 4 Utah*	No. 3	Jon M. Huntsman Center; Salt Lake City, UT		L 196.650-197.775
January 22	5:00 p.m.	at Arizona Quad Meet	No. 4	McKale Center; Tucson, AZ		1st 197.900
January 30	3:45 p.m.	No. 5 Denver	No. 3	Lloyd Noble Center; Norman, OK		W 198.200–196.625
February 6	3:45 p.m.	Texas Woman's*	No. 2	Lloyd Noble Center; Norman, OK		W 198.050–194.775
February 11	6:45 p.m.	George Washington*	No. 2	Lloyd Noble Center; Norman, OK		W 197.425–194.925
February 19	6:45 p.m.	Metroplex Challenge		Fort Worth Convention Center; Fort Worth, TX		1st 198.175
February 25	5:45 p.m.	at No. 3 Florida*	No. 2	O'Connell Center; Gainesville, FL		L 197.750–198.100
March 4	7:45 p.m.	No. 1 Michigan*	No. 3	Lloyd Noble Center; Norman, OK		W 198.475–197.900
March 6	2:00 p.m.	TWU Quad Meet		Kitty Magee Arena; Denton, TX		1st 198.075
March 11	8:00 p.m.	Tri-Meet		Desert Financial Arena; Tempe, AZ		1st 197.625
March 19	6:00 p.m.	Big 12 Conference tournament		Magness Arena; Denver, CO		1st 198.200
March 31	7:00 p.m.	NCAA regional		Lloyd Noble Center; Norman, OK		1st 198.175
April 2	5:00 p.m.	NCAA regional final		Lloyd Noble Center; Norman, OK		1st 198.250
April 14	12:00 p.m.	NCAA semifinal		Dickies Arena; Fort Worth, TX		1st 198.1125
April 16	12:00 p.m.	NCAA finals		Dickies Arena; Fort Worth, TX		1st 198.200
*Non-conference game; Rankings from Road to Nationals poll released prior to the game; All times are in Central time

Notes

1. Arizona Quad opponents: Arizona, Stanford and Utah State
2. Metroplex Challenge opponents: Denver, Stanford and Washington
3. TWU Quad Meet opponents: Air Force, Texas Woman's and SEMO
4. Tri-Meet opponents: Arizona State and Boise State

== Personnel ==
=== Coaching staff ===
Name	Position	Seasons at Oklahoma
K.J. Kindler	Head coach	16th
Lou Ball	Associate head coach	16th
Tom Haley	Associate head coach	16th

== Rankings ==
Ranking movements Legend: ██ Increase in ranking ██ Decrease in ranking
	Week												
Poll	Pre	1	2	3	4	5	6	7	8	9	10	11	Final
Road to Nationals	3	3	4	3	2	2	3	2	2	1	1	1	1
