= 2024 Oklahoma Sooners women's gymnastics team =

College gymnastics team season

2024 Oklahoma Sooners women's gymnastics
- Conference: Big 12 Conference
- Head coach: K.J. Kindler (18th season)
- Assistant coaches: Lou Ball (18th season); Tom Haley (18th season); Ashley Kerr (7th season)
- Home arena: Lloyd Noble Center

The 2024 Oklahoma Sooners women's gymnastics is an artistic gymnastics team that represented the University of Oklahoma in the Big 12 Conference during the 2024 NCAA women's gymnastics season. The team was coached by K.J. Kindler in her seventeenth season leading the Sooners.

== Previous season ==
Oklahoma won their sixth national title with a score of 198.3875.

== Preseason ==
On September 21, 2023, Oklahoma announced the return of former Oklahoma gymnast Olivia Trautman to the staff as the student assistant coach.

== Schedule ==
Date	Time	Opponent	Site	TV	Result
January 13	3:00 p.m.	ESPN Events Invitational	Maverik Center; West Valley City, UT	ABC	
February 2	8:00 p.m.	Arizona State and California	Desert Financial Arena; Tempe, AZ		
February 9	6:45 p.m.	Oklahoma Quad Meet	Lloyd Noble Center; Norman, OK		
February 23	6:45 p.m.	West Virginia	Lloyd Noble Center; Norman, OK		
March 1		Michigan	Lloyd Noble Center; Norman, OK		
March 3	2:00 p.m.	TWU Tri Meet	Kitty Magee Arena; Denton, TX		
March 10		at Arkansas	Bud Walton Arena; Fayetteville, AR		
March 17		Alabama	Lloyd Noble Center; Norman, OK		
All times are in Central time

== Personnel ==
=== Roster ===
Gymnasts
Name	Height	Year	Hometown
Jordan Bowers	5-6	JR	Lincoln, NE
Audrey Davis	5-3	SR	Frisco, TX
Danae Fletcher	5-3	JR	Philadelphia, PA
Soraya Hawthorne	4-11	5th	Memphis, TN
Bell Johnson	5-6	SR	Norman, OK
Caitin Kirkpatrick	5-5	JR	Norman, OK
Aspen Lenczner	5-2	FR	Oak Creek, WI
Katherine Levasseur	5-4	SR	San Antonio, TX
Sheridan Ramsey	5-4	SR	Tulsa, OK
Hannah Scheible	5-3	FR	Kimball, MI
Ava Siegfelt	5-6	SO	Williamsburg, VA
Danielle Sievers	5-5	JR	Gary, SD
Caitlin Smith	5-1	FR	Houston, TX
Ragan Smith	5-1	5th	Lewisville, TX
Madison Snook	5-4	JR	Ottawa, IL
Meilin Sullivan	5-4	SR	Kansas City, MO
Faith Torrez	5-1	SO	Bristol, WI
Keira Wells	5-2	FR	Augusta, KS
Amy Wier	5-0	JR	Wildwood, MO

- Last updated: November 2, 2023

Coaching staff
Position	Staff
Head coach	K.J. Kindler
Associate head coach	Lou Ball
Associate head coach	Tom Haley
Assistant coach	Ashley Kerr

- Last updated: November 2, 2023

== Rankings ==
Ranking movements
	Week												
Poll	Pre	1	2	3	4	5	6	7	8	9	10	11	Final
Road to Nationals													
