= 1983–84 Iowa State Cyclones men's basketball team =

American college basketball season

1983–84 Iowa State Cyclones men's basketball

NIT Tournament, First Round
- Conference: Big Eight Conference
- Record: 16–13 (6–8 Big Eight)
- Head coach: Johnny Orr (4th season)
- Assistant coach: Steve Antrim
- Home arena: Hilton Coliseum

1983–84 Big Eight Conference men's basketball standings
	Conf.				Overall
Team	W		L	PCT	W		L	PCT
No. 7 Oklahoma	13	–	1	.929	29	–	5	.853
Kansas †	9	–	5	.643	22	–	10	.688
Nebraska	7	–	7	.500	18	–	12	.600
Iowa State	6	–	8	.429	16	–	13	.552
Colorado	6	–	8	.429	16	–	13	.552
Kansas State	5	–	9	.357	14	–	15	.483
Oklahoma State	5	–	9	.357	13	–	15	.464
Missouri	5	–	9	.357	16	–	14	.533
† 1984 Big Eight tournament winner Rankings from AP Poll

The 1983–84 Iowa State Cyclones men's basketball team represented Iowa State University during the 1983–84 NCAA Division I men's basketball season. The Cyclones were coached by Johnny Orr, who was in his 4th season. They played their home games at Hilton Coliseum in Ames, Iowa.

They finished the season 16–13, 6–8 in Big Eight play to finish in a tie for fourth place. The Cyclones lost in the first round of the Big Eight tournament against Colorado, falling 65–62. They qualified for the NIT tournament, falling in the first round to Marquette, 73–53.

== Roster ==
1983–84 Iowa State Cyclones men's basketball team
Players
Coaches

Pos.	#	Name	Height	Weight	Year	Hometown
G		Barry Stevens	6 ft 5 in (1.96 m)	—	Jr
G		Terrence Allen (C)	6 ft 0 in (1.83 m)	—	Sr
F		Ron Harris (C)	6 ft 3 in (1.91 m)	—	Sr
G		Jeff Hornacek	6 ft 3 in (1.91 m)	—	So
C		David Moss	6 ft 9 in (2.06 m)	—	So
F		Ron Virgil	6 ft 4 in (1.93 m)	—	So
C		Sam Hill	6 ft 9 in (2.06 m)	—	Fr
F		John Culbertson	6 ft 9 in (2.06 m)	—
C		Brad Dudek	7 ft 1 in (2.16 m)	—
F		Ray Harris	—	—	Jr
		Wes Wallace	—	—	Jr
F		Tom Peterson	—	—	Jr
		Dave Rauker	—	—

Head coach

- Johnny Orr (Beloit)

Assistant coach(es)

- Steve Antrim

Legend

- (C) Team captain
- (S) Suspended
- (I) Ineligible
- (W) Walk-on
- Injured
- Current redshirt

== Schedule and results ==
Date time, TV	Rank^{#}	Opponent^{#}	Result	Record	Site city, state
Exhibition
November 19, 1983*; 5:30 pm		Brandon (Canada); Exhibition	W 81–45		Hilton Coliseum; Ames, Iowa
Regular season
November 26, 1983*; 1:30 pm		St. Cloud State	W 77–37	1–0	Hilton Coliseum; Ames, Iowa
November 30, 1983*; 7:35 pm		Vanderbilt	W 73–72 ^{OT}	2–0	Hilton Coliseum; Ames, Iowa
December 3, 1983*; 12:40 pm, WOI		Texas	W 81–57	3–0	Hilton Coliseum; Ames, Iowa
December 5, 1983*; 7:10 pm, WOI		Arizona	W 75–63	4–0	Hilton Coliseum; Ames, Iowa
December 10, 1983*; 7:35 pm		at Creighton	L 74–83	4–1	Omaha Civic Auditorium; Omaha, Nebraska
December 12, 1983*; 7:35 pm		South Dakota	W 92–64	5–1	Hilton Coliseum; Ames, Iowa
December 17, 1983*; 6:10 pm, WOI		at Drake; Iowa Big Four	W 79–72 ^{OT}	6–1	Veterans Memorial Auditorium; Des Moines, Iowa
December 22, 1983*; 6:35 pm		at Colorado State	W 59–58 ^{OT}	7–1	Moby Arena (2,691); Fort Collins, Colorado
December 29, 1983*; 8:00 pm		vs. No. 12 Boston College; Hoosier Classic Semifinals	L 80–88	7–2	Market Square Arena; Indianapolis, Indiana
December 30, 1983*; 6:00 pm		vs. Ball State; Hoosier Classic Consolation	W 72–64	8–2	Market Square Arena; Indianapolis, Indiana
January 2, 1984*; 8:00 pm		at Minnesota	L 64–66	8–3	Williams Arena; Minneapolis, Minnesota
January 9, 1984*; 8:00 pm, WOI		Northern Iowa; Iowa Big Four	W 91–75	9–3	Hilton Coliseum; Ames, Iowa
January 11, 1984; 8:10 pm, Big Eight		No. 17 Oklahoma	W 74–68	10–3 (1–0)	Hilton Coliseum; Ames, Iowa
January 14, 1984*; 3:10 pm, Big Eight		Iowa; CyHawk Rivalry	W 76–72 ^{2OT}	11–3	Hilton Coliseum; Ames, Iowa
January 18, 1984; 7:35 pm		Nebraska	L 63–64	11–4 (1–1)	Hilton Coliseum; Ames, Iowa
January 21, 1984; 4:10 pm, Big Eight		Kansas	W 61–56	12–4 (2–1)	Hilton Coliseum (14,381); Ames, Iowa
January 24, 1984; 8:05 pm		at Missouri	L 57–58	12–5 (2–2)	Hearnes Center (10,443); Columbia, Missouri
February 1, 1984; 8:10 pm, Big Eight		at Kansas State	L 69–75	12–6 (2–3)	Ahearn Fieldhouse; Manhattan, Kansas
February 4, 1984; 1:35 pm		Oklahoma State	W 67–63	13–6 (3–3)	Hilton Coliseum; Ames, Iowa
February 8, 1984; 8:10 pm, Big Eight		at Colorado	L 88–98	13–7 (3–4)	Coors Events Center; Boulder, Colorado
February 11, 1984; 7:30 pm		at Kansas	L 72–80	13–8 (3–5)	Allen Fieldhouse; Lawrence, Kansas
February 15, 1984; 7:35 pm		Missouri	L 61–64	13–9 (3–6)	Hilton Coliseum; Ames, Iowa
February 18, 1984; 7:35 pm		at Nebraska	W 69–48	14–9 (4–6)	Devaney Sports Center; Lincoln, Nebraska
February 22, 1984; 7:35 pm		Kansas State	W 62–55	15–9 (5–6)	Hilton Coliseum; Ames, Iowa
February 25, 1984; 7:05 pm		at No. 8 Oklahoma	L 69–93	15–10 (5–7)	Lloyd Noble Center; Norman, Oklahoma
February 29, 1984; 7:35 pm		at Oklahoma State	L 63–85	15–11 (5–8)	Gallagher-Iba Arena; Stillwater, Oklahoma
March 3, 1984; 1:40 pm, Big Eight		Colorado	W 70–62	16–11 (6–8)	Hilton Coliseum; Ames, Iowa
Big Eight tournament
March 7, 1984; 9:10 pm, Big Eight	(4)	(5) Colorado; Big Eight tournament quarterfinals	L 62–65	16–12	Hilton Coliseum; Ames, Iowa
National Invitation Tournament
March 15, 1984*; 8:00 pm, Cyclone Television Network		Marquette; NIT First round	L 53–73	16–13	Hilton Coliseum; Ames, Iowa
*Non-conference game. ^{#}Rankings from AP poll. (#) Tournament seedings in parentheses. All times are in Central Time.
