= 1983–84 Dayton Flyers men's basketball team =

American college basketball season

1983–84 Dayton Flyers men's basketball

NCAA tournament, Elite Eight
- Conference: Independent
- Record: 21–11
- Head coach: Don Donoher (20th season)
- Home arena: University of Dayton Arena

1983–84 NCAA Division I men's basketball independents standings
| | Conf. | | | | Overall |
| Team | W | | L | PCT | W | | L | PCT |
|---|---|---|---|---|---|---|---|---|
| No. 4 DePaul | | – | | – | 27 | – | 3 | .900 |
| UTSA | | – | | – | 20 | – | 8 | .714 |
| Southwestern Louisiana | | – | | – | 23 | – | 10 | .697 |
| Stetson | | – | | – | 19 | – | 9 | .679 |
| Dayton | | – | | – | 21 | – | 11 | .656 |
| Notre Dame | | – | | – | 21 | – | 12 | .636 |
| Marquette | | – | | – | 17 | – | 13 | .567 |
| Baptist | | – | | – | 15 | – | 13 | .536 |
| New Orleans | | – | | – | 14 | – | 14 | .500 |
| Texas–Pan American | | – | | – | 13 | – | 14 | .481 |
| Tennessee State | | – | | – | 12 | – | 15 | .444 |
| Utica | | – | | – | 11 | – | 15 | .423 |
| Southeastern Louisiana | | – | | – | 11 | – | 17 | .393 |
| UNC Wilmington | | – | | – | 11 | – | 17 | .393 |
| Campbell | | – | | – | 10 | – | 18 | .357 |
| Brooklyn | | – | | – | 8 | – | 20 | .286 |
| Monmouth | | – | | – | 6 | – | 21 | .222 |
| Georgia State | | – | | – | 6 | – | 22 | .214 |
| Eastern Washington | | – | | – | 4 | – | 22 | .154 |
| U.S. International | | – | | – | 2 | – | 26 | .071 |
Rankings from AP Poll

The 1983–84 Dayton Flyers men's basketball team represented the University of Dayton during the 1983–84 NCAA Division I men's basketball season. The Flyers, led by head coach Don Donoher, played their home games at the University of Dayton Arena and were an NCAA independent. Dayton received a bid to the NCAA tournament as No. 10 seed in the West region where they made an unexpected run to the Elite Eight. They defeated No. 7 seed LSU 74–66 in the opening round, upset No. 2 seed Oklahoma 89–85 in the second round, and advanced over No. 6 Washington to reach the West regional final. They lost to eventual National champion Georgetown, 61–49, and finished the season 21–11.

== Roster ==
1983–84 Dayton Flyers men's basketball team
Players
Coaches

| Pos. | # | Name | Height | Weight | Year | Previous school | Hometown |
|---|---|---|---|---|---|---|---|
| PG | 3 | Sedric Toney | 6 ft 2 in (1.88 m) | 175 lb (79 kg) | Jr | Western Nebraska CC | Dayton, Ohio |
| G | 4 | Ted Harris | 6 ft 1 in (1.85 m) | — | Jr | | Kettering, Ohio |
| G | 11 | Larry Schellenberg | 6 ft 3 in (1.91 m) | — | Jr | | Floyds Knobs, Indiana |
| G | 14 | Dan Christie | 6 ft 1 in (1.85 m) | — | Fr | | Oak Harbor, Ohio |
| G/F | 22 | Roosevelt Chapman | 6 ft 4 in (1.93 m) | 210 lb (95 kg) | Sr | Westinghouse | Brooklyn, New York |
| G | 23 | Damon Goodwin | 6 ft 6 in (1.98 m) | — | So | | Saint Mary's, Ohio |
| F | 30 | Ed Young | 6 ft 7 in (2.01 m) | — | So | Upper Sandusky | Upper Sandusky, Ohio |
| F | 33 | Anthony Grant | 6 ft 5 in (1.96 m) | — | Fr | Miami Senior | Miami, Florida |

Head coach

- Don Donoher (Dayton)

Assistant coach(es)

Legend

- (C) Team captain
- (S) Suspended
- (I) Ineligible
- (W) Walk-on
- Injured
- Current redshirt

== Schedule and results ==
| Date time, TV | Rank^{#} | Opponent^{#} | Result | Record | Site (attendance) city, state |
Regular season
| Dec 3, 1983* | | Louisiana-Monroe | W 80–78 | 1–0 | University of Dayton Arena; Dayton, Ohio |
| Dec 7, 1983* | | at Miami (OH) | L 59–67 | 1–1 | Millett Hall; Oxford, Ohio |
| Dec 10, 1983* | | at Michigan | L 60–82 | 1–2 | Crisler Arena; Ann Arbor, Michigan |
| Dec 12, 1983* | | Youngstown State | W 73–64 | 2–2 | University of Dayton Arena; Dayton, Ohio |
| Dec 17, 1983* | | at Toledo | L 70–77 | 2–3 | John F. Savage Hall; Toledo, Ohio |
| Dec 20, 1983* | | Virginia Commonwealth | L 67–73 | 2–4 | University of Dayton Arena; Dayton, Ohio |
| Dec 29, 1983* | | Yale | W 78–57 | 3–4 | University of Dayton Arena; Dayton, Ohio |
| Dec 30, 1983* | | Oklahoma State | W 82–67 | 4–4 | University of Dayton Arena; Dayton, Ohio |
| Jan 2, 1984* | | Miami (OH) | W 89–79 | 5–4 | University of Dayton Arena; Dayton, Ohio |
| Jan 7, 1984* | | Eastern Kentucky | W 69–62 | 6–4 | University of Dayton Arena; Dayton, Ohio |
| Jan 11, 1984* | | at Loyola (IL) | L 93–94 | 6–5 | Alumni Gym; Chicago, Illinois |
| Jan 14, 1984* | | Missouri | L 51–56 | 6–6 | University of Dayton Arena; Dayton, Ohio |
| Jan 17, 1984* | | at Temple | W 63–62 | 7–6 | McGonigle Hall; Philadelphia, Pennsylvania |
| Jan 21, 1984* | | at Marquette | L 64–66 | 7–7 | MECCA Arena; Milwaukee, Wisconsin |
| Jan 25, 1984* | | at Western Kentucky | W 71–68 | 8–7 | E.A. Diddle Arena; Bowling Green, Kentucky |
| Jan 28, 1984* | | Providence | W 73–47 | 9–7 | University of Dayton Arena; Dayton, Ohio |
| Feb 2, 1984* | | Detroit Mercy | W 82–74 | 10–7 | University of Dayton Arena; Dayton, Ohio |
| Feb 4, 1984* | | Vermont | W 81–53 | 11–7 | University of Dayton Arena; Dayton, Ohio |
| Feb 7, 1984* | | at Creighton | W 79–64 | 12–7 | Omaha Civic Auditorium; Omaha, Nebraska |
| Feb 11, 1984* | | La Salle | W 84–69 | 13–7 | University of Dayton Arena; Dayton, Ohio |
| Feb 13, 1984* | | at Maryland | L 59–61 | 13–8 | Cole Fieldhouse; College Park, Maryland |
| Feb 15, 1984* | | at Butler | W 77–76 | 14–8 | Hinkle Fieldhouse; Indianapolis, Indiana |
| Feb 18, 1984* | | No. 3 DePaul | W 72–71 | 15–8 | University of Dayton Arena; Dayton, Ohio |
| Feb 22, 1984* | | at No. 5 DePaul | L 59–79 | 15–9 | Rosemont Horizon; Rosemont, Illinois |
| Feb 25, 1984* | | at Cincinnati | W 82–60 | 16–9 | Riverfront Coliseum; Cincinnati, Ohio |
| Feb 29, 1984* | | at Xavier | L 61–72 | 16–10 | Cincinnati Gardens; Cincinnati, Ohio |
| Mar 3, 1984* | | Notre Dame | W 80–70 | 17–10 | University of Dayton Arena (13,505); Dayton, Ohio |
| Mar 10, 1984* | | Old Dominion | W 64–63 | 18–10 | University of Dayton Arena (11,525); Dayton, Ohio |
NCAA Tournament
| Mar 15, 1984* | (10 W) | vs. (7 W) LSU; First round | W 74–66 | 19–10 | Jon M. Huntsman Center; Salt Lake City, Utah |
| Mar 17, 1984* | (10 W) | vs. (2 W) No. 7 Oklahoma; Second Round | W 89–85 | 20–10 | Jon M. Huntsman Center; Salt Lake City, Utah |
| Mar 23, 1984* | (10 W) | vs. (6 W) No. 15 Washington; West Regional semifinal – Sweet Sixteen | W 64–58 | 21–10 | Pauley Pavilion (12,542); Los Angeles, California |
| Mar 25, 1984*; 4:00 p.m., CBS | (10 W) | vs. (1 W) No. 2 Georgetown; West Regional final – Elite Eight | L 49–61 | 21–11 | Pauley Pavilion; Los Angeles, California |
*Non-conference game. ^{#}Rankings from AP Poll. (#) Tournament seedings in parentheses. W=West. All times are in Eastern Time.
