= 1984 Big Eight Conference men's basketball tournament =

- Classification: Division I
- Season: 1983–84
- Teams: 8
- First round site: Campus Sites; Campus Arenas
- Finals site: Kemper Arena; Kansas City, MO
- Champions: Kansas (2nd title)
- Winning coach: Larry Brown (1st title)
- MVP: Wayman Tisdale (Oklahoma)

1983–84 Big Eight Conference men's basketball standings
	Conf.				Overall
Team	W		L	PCT	W		L	PCT
No. 7 Oklahoma	13	–	1	.929	29	–	5	.853
Kansas †	9	–	5	.643	22	–	10	.688
Nebraska	7	–	7	.500	18	–	12	.600
Iowa State	6	–	8	.429	16	–	13	.552
Colorado	6	–	8	.429	16	–	13	.552
Kansas State	5	–	9	.357	14	–	15	.483
Oklahoma State	5	–	9	.357	13	–	15	.464
Missouri	5	–	9	.357	16	–	14	.533
† 1984 Big Eight tournament winner Rankings from AP Poll

The 1984 Big Eight Conference men's basketball tournament was held March 8–10 at a combination of on-campus gymnasiums and Kemper Arena in Kansas City, Missouri.

Second-seeded Kansas defeated top-seeded Oklahoma in the championship game, 79–78, to win the Big Eight men's basketball tournament.

The Jayhawks received an automatic bid to the 1984 NCAA tournament. They were joined in the tournament by fellow Big Eight member Oklahoma, who earned an at-large bid.

== Format ==
All eight of the conference's members participated in the tournament field. They were seeded based on regular season conference records, with all teams placed and paired in the initial quarterfinal round.

All first-round games were played on the home court of the higher-seeded team. The semifinals and championship game were played at Kemper Arena in Kansas City, Missouri.

== Bracket ==
Quarterfinals; Thursday, March 8
1	#6 Oklahoma	72
8	Missouri	66
5	Colorado	65
4	Iowa State	62
3	Nebraska	39
6	Kansas State	41
7	Oklahoma State	58
2	Kansas	75

Semifinals; Friday, March 9
1	#6 Oklahoma	90
5	Colorado	78
6	Kansas State	59
2	Kansas	70

Championship; Saturday, March 10
1	#6 Oklahoma	78
2	Kansas	79
