= 1983–84 Kansas Jayhawks men's basketball team =

American college basketball season

1983–84 Kansas Jayhawks men's basketball

Big Eight Conference men's basketball tournament champions

NCAA tournament, Second Round
- Conference: Big Eight Conference
- Record: 22–10 (9–5 Big 8)
- Head coach: Larry Brown (1st season)
- Assistant coaches: R. C. Buford (1st season); John Calipari (2nd season); Bob Hill (5th season); Ed Manning (1st season)
- Captains: Carl Henry; Kelly Knight; Brian Martin
- Home arena: Allen Fieldhouse

1983–84 Big Eight Conference men's basketball standings
	Conf.				Overall
Team	W		L	PCT	W		L	PCT
No. 7 Oklahoma	13	–	1	.929	29	–	5	.853
Kansas †	9	–	5	.643	22	–	10	.688
Nebraska	7	–	7	.500	18	–	12	.600
Iowa State	6	–	8	.429	16	–	13	.552
Colorado	6	–	8	.429	16	–	13	.552
Kansas State	5	–	9	.357	14	–	15	.483
Oklahoma State	5	–	9	.357	13	–	15	.464
Missouri	5	–	9	.357	16	–	14	.533
† 1984 Big Eight tournament winner Rankings from AP Poll

The 1983–84 Kansas Jayhawks men's basketball team represented the University of Kansas during the 1983–84 NCAA Division I men's basketball season.

== Roster ==
- Carl Henry
- Kelly Knight
- Calvin Thompson
- Greg Dreiling
- Ron Kellogg
- Brian Martin
- Mark Turgeon
- Kerry Boagni
- Mike Marshall
- Tad Boyle
- Cedric Hunter
- Jeff Guiot
- Tim Banks

== Schedule ==
Date time, TV	Rank^{#}	Opponent^{#}	Result	Record	Site city, state
November 28*	No. 17	at No. 3 Houston	L 76-91	0-1	Hofheinz Pavilion; Houston, TX
December 1*		at Saint Louis	W 67-63	1-1	St. Louis Arena; St. Louis, MO
December 3*		Morehead State	W 75-57	2–1	Allen Fieldhouse; Lawrence, KS
December 5*		Jackson State	W 89-57	3–1	Allen Fieldhouse; Lawrence, KS
December 10*		No. 2 Kentucky	L 50-72	3-2	Allen Fieldhouse; Lawrence, KS
December 17*		Florida Southern	W 85-73	4-2	Allen Fieldhouse; Lawrence, KS
December 19*		Oral Roberts	W 65-64	5-2	Allen Fieldhouse; Lawrence, KS
December 22*		at Ohio State	L 74-79	5-3	St. John Arena; Columbus, OH
December 28*		at Tulane; Sugar Bowl Classic	W 67-64	6-3	Louisiana Superdome; New Orleans, LA
December 29*		vs. Southwestern Louisiana; Sugar Bowl Classic	L 45-54	6-4	Louisiana Superdome; New Orleans, LA
January 7*		FIU	W 99-47	7-4	Allen Fieldhouse; Lawrence, KS
January 11*		Texas Southern	W 101-64	8-4	Allen Fieldhouse; Lawrence, KS
January 14		Colorado	W 53-48	9-4 (1-0)	Allen Fieldhouse; Lawrence, KS
January 18		Missouri; Border War	W 73-56	10-4 (2-0)	Allen Fieldhouse (16,300); Lawrence, KS
January 21		at Iowa State	L 56-61	10-5 (2-1)	James H. Hilton Coliseum; Ames, IA
January 25		Nebraska	W 77-61	11-5 (3-1)	Allen Fieldhouse; Lawrence, KS
January 28		Kansas State; Sunflower Showdown	W 65-54	12-5 (4-1)	Allen Fieldhouse (16,300); Lawrence, KS
February 1		at No. 12 Oklahoma	L 84-103	12-6 (4-2)	Lloyd Noble Center; Norman, OK
February 5*		Wichita State	W 79-69	13-6	Allen Fieldhouse; Lawrence, KS
February 8		at Oklahoma State	L 61-71	13-7 (4-3)	Gallagher-Iba Arena; Stillwater, OK
February 11		Iowa State	W 80-72	14-7 (5-3)	Allen Fieldhouse; Lawrence, KS
February 15		at Nebraska	W 67-66	15-7 (6-3)	Bob Devaney Sports Center; Lincoln, NE
February 18		at Missouri	W 72-62	16-7 (7-3)	Hearnes Center; Columbia, MO
February 22		No. 8 Oklahoma	L 82-92 ^{OT}	16-8 (7-4)	Allen Fieldhouse; Lawrence, KS
February 25		at Kansas State; Sunflower Showdown	W 63-61	17-8 (8-4)	Ahearn Field House; Manhattan, KS
February 29		at Colorado	L 85-89	17-9 (8-5)	Coors Events/Conference Center; Boulder, CO
March 3		Oklahoma State	W 91-70	18-9 (9-5)	Allen Fieldhouse; Lawrence, KS
March 8		Oklahoma State; Big Eight Conference men's basketball tournament quarterfinals	W 75-68	19-9	Allen Fieldhouse; Lawrence, KS
March 9		vs. Kansas State; Big Eight Tournament Semifinals	W 70-59	20-9	Kemper Arena; Kansas City, MO
March 10		vs. No. 6 Oklahoma; Big Eight Tournament Championship Game	W 79-78	21-9	Kemper Arena; Kansas City, MO
March 16*	(5)	vs. (12) Alcorn State; NCAA Midwest Regional first round	W 57-56	22-9	Mid-South Coliseum; Memphis, TN
March 18*	(5)	vs. (4) No. 12 Wake Forest; NCAA Midwest Regional second round	L 59-69	22-10	Mid-South Coliseum; Memphis, TN
*Non-conference game. ^{#}Rankings from AP Poll. (#) Tournament seedings in parentheses. MW=Midwest.
