= Iowa State Cyclones women's gymnastics =

College gymnastics team representing Iowa State University

- Founded: 1970
- University: Iowa State University
- Head coach: Ashley Miles Greig
- Conference: Big 12
- Location: Ames, Iowa
- Home arena: Hilton Coliseum (Capacity: 14,384)
- Nickname: Cyclones
- Colors: Cardinal and gold

Super Six appearances
- 2006

NCAA Tournament appearances
- 1994, 1997, 1998, 1999, 2000, 2001, 2002, 2003, 2004, 2005, 2006, 2007, 2008, 2009, 2010, 2011, 2012, 2013, 2014, 2015, 2022, 2024

Conference championships
- 1975, 1977, 2000, 2006

The Iowa State Cyclones women's gymnastics team represented Iowa State University (ISU) and competed in the Big 12 Conference of NCAA Division I. The women's gymnastics program was discontinued in 2026.

== History ==
Iowa State first put together a women's gymnastic team in time for the 1973-1974 season, Char Christiansen lead that squad. Christiansen led the Cyclones to their first Big Eight Conference title in 1975. The Cyclones had limited success through most of the late 1970s and 1980s.

The rebuilding process of the Cyclone program began with the hiring of Head Coach Amy Pyle in 1994. In 2000, her final season, the team won their first Big 12 championship and placed 8th overall at the NCAA Tournament, the highest finish in program history at that point.

After Pyle's retirement, Iowa State hired former letter winner and assistant coach K. J. Kindler, she would go on to be the most successful coach in program history. The highlights of her tenure were making back-to-back NCAA Finals in 2005-2006 and Janet Anson's individual career. In 2006 they won their second Big 12 Championship and made the first and only Super Six in school history. During her collegiate career, Anson was a four-time First Team All-American in vault (twice), floor, and all-around. At the conclusion of the season she left for Oklahoma.

Head Coach Jay Ronayne has continued where Kindler left off. Under his leadership the Cyclones have qualified for NCAA Regionals every year and have had ten Big 12 Champions.

On March 3, 2026, it was announced that the ISU women's gymnastics program would be discontinued.

== Individual Accomplishments ==
=== All-Americans ===
First Team All-Americans
Year	Player	Event
2000	Kelli More; Betsy Hamm	Balance Beam; Balance Beam
2004	Janet Anson	Vault
2005	Laura-Kay Powell; Janet Anson	Floor; Vault
2006	Laura-Kay Powell; Erin Dethloff; Janet Anson; Janet Anson; Janet Anson	Floor; All-Around; Floor; All-Around; Vault
2013	Michelle Shealy	Balance Beam
2014	Camille Santerre-Gervais	Uneven Bars
2020	Andrea Maldonado	Floor

Second Team All-Americans
Year	Player	Event
2000	Betsy Hamm; Betsy Hamm	Bars; All-Around
2003	Erin Dethloff	All-Around
2004	Erin Dethloff; Janet Anson; Janet Anson	Beam; All-Around; Floor
2005	Erin Dethloff; Laura-Kay Powell	All-Around; Vault
2006	Erin Dethloff; Erin Dethloff	Floor; Uneven Bars
2007	Janet Anson	Beam
2015	Caitlin Brown	Beam
2021	Addy De Jesus; Addy De Jesus	Vault; All-Around
2022	Makayla Maxwell	Vault

=== Conference Individual Champions ===
Big 12 Individual Champions
Year	Player	Event
1996	Libby Bell	Floor
1997	Kim Mazza	Floor
1998	Kelli More	Beam
1999	Kelli More; Sissy Huey	Beam; Bars
2000	Betsy Hamm; Betsy Hamm; Sissy Huey; Betsy Hamm	Beam; Bars; Bars; All-Around
2001	Sissy Huey; Stephanie Sweitzer; Shelly Kringen; Shelly Kringen	Floor; Beam; Vault; All-Around
2002	Sissy Huey; Stephanie Sweitzer; Sissy Huey	Bars; Bars; All-Around
2003	Abigail Richey	Vault
2004	Erin Dethloff	Bars
2005	Janet Anson	Floor
2006	Erin Dethloff; Janet Anson; Janet Anson	Bars; Vault; Floor
2007	Janet Anson	Bars
2009	Jasmine Thompson; Cecilia Maccani; Megan Barnes	Beam; Bars; Vault
2012	Celine Paulus	Vault
2014	Camille Saterre-Gervais	Bars
2015	Caitlin Brown; Haylee Young	Bars; All-Around
2018	Haylee Young	Floor
2022	Maddie Diab	Floor
2023	Maddie Diab	Floor

== Facilities ==
The team practices at the Amy and Dennis Pyle Family Gymnastics Facility that was renovated in 2002. The facility includes an 80-foot divider wall, matting in all uneven bar and balance beam areas, a balance beam dismount pit, cardiovascular elliptical trainers and treadmills, and an open pit vaulting station.

== Past Olympians ==
- (Peru) Ariana Orrego (2016; 2020)
- (Spain) Marina González (2020)
