= 1983–84 Oklahoma Sooners men's basketball team =

American college basketball season

1983–84 Oklahoma Sooners men's basketball

Big 8 Conference Regular Season Champions

NCAA men's Division I tournament, Second Round
- Conference: Big 8 Conference

Ranking
- Coaches: No. 8
- AP: No. 7
- Record: 29–5 (13–1 Big 8)
- Head coach: Billy Tubbs (4th season)
- Assistant coach: Mike Newell (4th season)
- Home arena: Lloyd Noble Center (Capacity: 11,528)

1983–84 Big Eight Conference men's basketball standings
	Conf.				Overall
Team	W		L	PCT	W		L	PCT
No. 7 Oklahoma	13	–	1	.929	29	–	5	.853
Kansas †	9	–	5	.643	22	–	10	.688
Nebraska	7	–	7	.500	18	–	12	.600
Iowa State	6	–	8	.429	16	–	13	.552
Colorado	6	–	8	.429	16	–	13	.552
Kansas State	5	–	9	.357	14	–	15	.483
Oklahoma State	5	–	9	.357	13	–	15	.464
Missouri	5	–	9	.357	16	–	14	.533
† 1984 Big Eight tournament winner Rankings from AP Poll

The 1983–84 Oklahoma Sooners men's basketball team represented the University of Oklahoma in competitive college basketball during the 1983–84 NCAA Division I season. The Oklahoma Sooners men's basketball team played its home games in the Lloyd Noble Center and was a member of the National Collegiate Athletic Association's (NCAA) former Big Eight Conference at that time. The team posted a 29–5 overall record and a 13–1 conference record to finish first in the Conference for head coach Billy Tubbs. This was the first Big Eight Conference Regular Season Championship for Tubbs.

The team was led by All American and Big Eight Conference Men's Basketball Player of the Year Wayman Tisdale. The team lost its second game at the Great Alaska Shootout. It then won eleven in a row before enduring its only conference loss at Iowa State. It then won four in a row before losing to Memphis. The team won the rest of its regular season games and the first two Big Eight Conference Tournament games bringing its win streak to 13. It lost the conference title game to Kansas. The team then lost its first game in the 1983 NCAA Division I men's basketball tournament to Dayton.

Over the course of the season, Wayman Tisdale established the current Oklahoma Sooners men's basketball single-season scoring average (27.0) and single-game points (61) records.

== Roster ==
1983–84 Oklahoma Sooners men's basketball team
Players
Coaches

Pos.	#	Name	Height	Weight	Year	Previous school	Hometown
G	10	Mark Wade	5 ft 11 in (1.8 m)	155 lb (70 kg)	Fr	Banning	San Pedro, California
G	11	Jan Pannell	6 ft 1 in (1.85 m)	175 lb (79 kg)	Sr	McKinley	Washington, D.C.
G	22	William Tisdale	6 ft 4 in (1.93 m)	210 lb (95 kg)	So	Booker T. Washington	Tulsa, Oklahoma
F	23	Wayman Tisdale	6 ft 9 in (2.06 m)	240 lb (109 kg)	So	Booker T. Washington	Tulsa, Oklahoma
G	32	Tim McCalister	6 ft 3 in (1.91 m)	195 lb (88 kg)	Fr	West Side	Gary, Indiana

Head coach

- Billy Tubbs (Lamar)

Assistant coach(es)

Legend

- (C) Team captain
- (S) Suspended
- (I) Ineligible
- (W) Walk-on
- Injured
- Current redshirt

Roster

== Schedule and results ==
Date time, TV	Rank^{#}	Opponent^{#}	Result	Record	Site city, state
Regular Season
November 25, 1983*	No. 20	vs. USC; Great Alaska Shootout	W 92–91	1–0	Sullivan Arena; Anchorage, AK
November 26, 1983*	No. 20	vs. No. 14 Arkansas; Great Alaska Shootout	L 78–84	1–1	Sullivan Arena; Anchorage, AK
November 27, 1983*	No. 20	vs. Santa Clara; Great Alaska Shootout	W 91–77	2–1	Sullivan Arena; Anchorage, AK
December 3, 1983*		Central Missouri State	W 90–50	3–1	Lloyd Noble Center; Norman, OK
December 6, 1983*		Arkansas State	W 83–61	4–1	Lloyd Noble Center; Norman, OK
December 8, 1983*		Georgia State	W 94–66	5–1	Lloyd Noble Center; Norman, OK
December 10, 1983*		Arizona State	W 89–76	6–1	Lloyd Noble Center; Norman, OK
December 17, 1983*		Southwestern (KS)	W 98–53	7–1	Lloyd Noble Center; Norman, OK
December 23, 1983*		at Oklahoma City	W 70–54	8–1	Frederickson Fieldhouse; Oklahoma City, OK
December 28, 1983*		vs. UTSA; All-College Basketball Tournament	W 112–72	9–1	Myriad Convention Center; Oklahoma City, OK
December 29, 1983*		vs. Arkansas–Little Rock; All-College Basketball Tournament Final	W 87–62	10–1	Myriad Convention Center; Oklahoma City, OK
January 4, 1984*		McNeese State	W 118–79	11–1	Lloyd Noble Center; Norman, OK
January 7, 1984*		at Syracuse	W 98–91	12–1	Carrier Dome; Syracuse, NY
January 11, 1984	No. 17	at Iowa State	L 68–74	12–2 (0–1)	Hilton Coliseum; Ames, IA
January 14, 1984*	No. 17	Nicholls State	W 107–51	13–2	Lloyd Noble Center; Norman, OK
January 18, 1984	No. 20	at Colorado	W 100–89 ^{2OT}	14–2 (1–1)	CU Events/Conference Center; Boulder, CO
January 21, 1984	No. 20	at Kansas State	W 83–80	15–2 (2–1)	Ahearn Field House; Manhattan, KS
January 24, 1984	No. 11	Oklahoma State; Bedlam Series	W 115–55	16–2 (3–1)	Lloyd Noble Center; Norman, OK
January 28, 1984*	No. 11	at No. 13 Memphis State	L 65–69	16–3	Mid-South Coliseum; Memphis, TN
February 1, 1984	No. 12	Kansas	W 103–84	17–3 (4–1)	Lloyd Noble Center; Norman, OK
February 4, 1984	No. 12	Missouri	W 76–65	18–3 (5–1)	Lloyd Noble Center; Norman, OK
February 8, 1984	No. 10	at Nebraska	W 78–67	19–3 (6–1)	Bob Devaney Sports Center; Lincoln, NE
February 11, 1984	No. 10	Kansas State	W 80–74	20–3 (7–1)	Lloyd Noble Center; Norman, OK
February 15, 1984	No. 9	at Oklahoma State; Bedlam Series	W 57–55	21–3 (8–1)	Gallagher-Iba Arena; Stillwater, OK
February 18, 1984	No. 9	Colorado	W 93–80	22–3 (9–1)	Lloyd Noble Center; Norman, OK
February 22, 1984	No. 8	at Kansas	W 92–82 ^{OT}	23–3 (10–1)	Allen Fieldhouse; Lawrence, KS
February 25, 1984	No. 8	Iowa State	W 93–69	24–3 (11–1)	Lloyd Noble Center; Norman, OK
February 28, 1984	No. 6	at Missouri	W 61–60	25–3 (12–1)	Hearnes Center; Columbia, MO
March 1, 1984	No. 6	Nebraska	W 79–70	26–3 (13–1)	Lloyd Noble Center; Norman, OK
March 3, 1984*	No. 6	No. 7 UNLV	W 78–70	27–3	Lloyd Noble Center; Norman, OK
Big Eight tournament
March 8, 1984*	(1) No. 6	(8) Missouri; Quarterfinals	W 72–66	28–3	Lloyd Noble Center; Norman, OK
March 9, 1984*	(1) No. 6	vs. (5) Colorado; Semifinals	W 90–78	29–3	Kemper Arena; Kansas City, MO
March 10, 1984*	(1) No. 6	vs. (2) Kansas; Championship Game	L 78–79	29–4	Kemper Arena; Kansas City, MO
NCAA tournament
March 17, 1984*	(2 W) No. 7	vs. (10 W) Dayton; Second Round	L 85–89	29–5	Jon M. Huntsman Center; Salt Lake City, UT
*Non-conference game. ^{#}Rankings from AP Poll. (#) Tournament seedings in parentheses.

=== NCAA basketball tournament ===
The following is a summary of the team's performance in the NCAA Division I men's basketball tournament:

- West
  - Dayton (10) 89, (2) Oklahoma 85

== Honors ==
- All-American: Wayman Tisdale (2nd of 3 times)
- Big Eight POY: Tisdale

== Team players drafted into the NBA ==
The following players were drafted in the 1984 NBA draft:

Round	Pick	Player	Position	NBA club
9	186	Calvin Pierce	Forward	Chicago Bulls

The following players were varsity letter-winners from this team who were drafted in the NBA draft in later years:

- 1985 NBA draft: Wayman Tisdale (1st, 2nd, Indiana Pacers)
- 1987 NBA draft: Tim McCalister (3rd, 47th, Los Angeles Clippers), David Johnson (4th, 89th, Dallas Mavericks), Darryl Kennedy (4th, 91st, Boston Celtics)
