= Marcus Goree =

American basketball player (born 1977)

Marcus K. Goree
Personal information
- Born: October 11, 1977 (age 49) Dallas, Texas, U.S.
- Listed height: 6 ft 9 in (2.06 m)
- Listed weight: 255 lb (116 kg)

Career information
- High school: Hillcrest (Dallas, Texas)
- College: West Virginia (1996–2000)
- NBA draft: 2000: undrafted
- Playing career: 2000–2015
- Position: Power forward / center

Career history
- 2000–2001: STB Le Havre
- 2001–2002: Deutsche Bank Skyliners
- 2002–2003: Maccabi Tel Aviv
- 2003–2004: Gran Canaria
- 2004–2007: Benetton Treviso
- 2007–2008: CSKA Moscow
- 2008–2009: Triumph Lyubertsy
- 2010–2011: Phantoms Braunschweig
- 2011: PAOK
- 2012: Benetton Treviso
- 2012–2013: Cholet Basket
- 2013–2014: Brasília
- 2014–2015: Atlético Aguada

Career highlights
- EuroLeague champion (2008); CSKA Moscow League champion (2008); CSKA Moscow Super Cup champion (2008); CSKA Moscow Cup champion (2008); Italian League champion (2006); Italian Cup champion (2005) (2007); Italian Supercup champion (2006); Italian Supercup MVP (2006); Maccabi Tel Aviv Champion (2002-03); Maccabi Tel Aviv Cup Champion (2002-03); LSB Champion (2013-14); German League Rookie of the Year (2002)

Marcus Goree (born October 11, 1977) is an American former professional basketball player.

== College career ==
Goree's collegiate team was the West Virginia University Mountaineers, where he played four seasons (109 games, starting 62), from 1996 to 2000.

== Professional career ==
Goree started his professional career at the age of 23. Some of the clubs he has played with in his pro career include: Le Havre, Deutsche Bank Skyliners, Maccabi Tel Aviv, Gran Canaria, Benetton Treviso, CSKA Moscow, Triumph Lyubertsy, Estudiantes, and the New Yorker Phantoms Braunschweig. In January 2011, he signed again with Benetton Treviso. In August 2012, he signed with Cholet Basket.

== Career statistics ==
Legend
GP	Games played	GS	Games started	MPG	Minutes per game
FG%	Field-goal percentage	3P%	3-point field-goal percentage	FT%	Free-throw percentage
RPG	Rebounds per game	APG	Assists per game	SPG	Steals per game
BPG	Blocks per game	PPG	Points per game	PIR	Performance index rating
**Bold**	Career high

=== EuroLeague ===
†	Denotes season in which Goree won the EuroLeague
*	Led the league

Year	Team	GP	GS	MPG	FG%	3P%	FT%	RPG	APG	SPG	BPG	PPG	PIR
2001–02	Frankfurt	14	13	**35.2**	.463	.319	.658	**8.1**	1.4	**1.4**	**1.5**	**18.1**	**21.1**
2002–03	Maccabi	20	17	27.5	.506	.320	.490	5.7	.4	.7	.8	10.0	14.8
2004–05	Treviso	22	**22**	31.3	.437	**.447**	**.709**	5.9	**2.2**	**1.4**	.7	11.8	15.5
2005–06	Treviso	20	18	31.1	.450	.344	.620	6.7	1.6	1.1	1.4	11.4	15.4
2006–07	Treviso	18	16	30.3	**.521**	.408	.694	6.4	1.4	1.3	.8	12.7	15.8
2007–08†	CSKA Moscow	**25***	17	24.0	.443	.345	.563	4.9	.8	.7	1.0	7.1	9.5
Career		119	103	29.4	.467	.366	.623	6.1	1.3	1.1	1.0	11.3	14.1
