= K.J. Kindler =

American gymnastics head coach (born 1970)

Current position
- Title: Head coach
- Team: Oklahoma
- Conference: SEC

Biographical details
- Born: June 26, 1970 (age 56); Lake Elmo, Minnesota
- Education: Iowa State (1988-92)

Coaching career (HC unless noted)
- 1992–2001: Iowa State (asst.)
- 2001–2006: Iowa State
- 2006–present: Oklahoma

Accomplishments and honors

Championships
- 13x Big 12 Champions (2008, 2009, 2010, 2012, 2013, 2014, 2015, 2016, 2017, 2018, 2019, 2022, 2023) 13x NCAA Regional Championships (2010, 2011, 2012, 2013, 2014, 2015, 2016, 2017, 2018, 2019, 2021, 2022, 2023) 8x National Champions (2014, 2016, 2017, 2019, 2022, 2023, 2025, 2026

Awards
- 3x National Head Coach of the Year (2005, 2010, 2015) 16x Big 12 Coach of the Year (2004, 2005, 2006, 2008, 2010, 2012, 2013, 2014, 2015, 2016, 2017, 2018, 2021, 2022, 2023, 2024) 1x SEC Coach of the Year (2026)

K.J. Kindler (born June 26, 1970) is an American college gymnastics coach and the current head coach of the Oklahoma Sooners women's gymnastics team, a role she has held since 2006.

== Coaching career ==
=== 1992–2006: Iowa State ===
Following her graduation from Iowa State University in 1992, Kindler became the Iowa State Cyclones assistant coach. She was an assistant coach for nine years until 2001 when she became head coach. She was the head coach of the Cyclones team until 2006, when she was offered the position at University of Oklahoma.

=== 2006-present: Oklahoma ===
She has been the Oklahoma Sooners' Head Coach since 2006 and has transformed the program into one of the nation's elite with the program being ranked either first or second every year in the Pre-Season Poll.

== Competitive gymnastics career ==
As a high school gymnast at Wilton, she won several Connecticut (CIAC) state division M and state open titles during her junior and senior years. Arguably, her best event was Floor Exercise where she was a two time Class M champion in '87 and '88. She also won the State Open title on Floor exercise in '87 and was runner up in '88. At the time, the CIAC did not hold a team event at State Open. If one was held, Wilton would have been in the hunt to claim the team title in both years that Kindler was on the team.

In 1987, she helped the Wilton Warriors win the Class M team title and nearly swept the gold medal on every event, placing first in the All Around, Uneven Bars, Balance Beam, and Floor Exercise. She placed 5th on Vault. At the Connecticut State Open championship, she won Floor Exercise.

In 1988, Kindler and the Wilton Warriors repeated as the Class M team champion. Individually, Kindler repeated as Floor Exercise Class M champion. She placed 4th in both the All Around and Balance Beam, 3rd on both Vault and Uneven Bars. At the Connecticut State Open Championships, Kindler was 2nd in the All Around with a 36.800 (VT 8.850, UB 9.150, BB 9.300, FX 9.500). These individual event scores placed her 6th on Vault, 3rd on Uneven Bars, 2nd on Floor Exercise, and 1st on Balance Beam, her 2nd state open title overall.

Kindler's high school and club results earned her an athletic scholarship to Iowa State University and the Iowa State Cyclones women's gymnastics team from 1989 to 1992 seasons. Upon graduating from Iowa State in 1992, she joined the gymnastics team as assistant coach.

== Personal life ==
Kindler is married to Lou Ball, the assistant coach of the Oklahoma Sooners gymnastics program. The couple have two daughters, Maggie and Adelade. Maggie is a colleigiate gymnast for the Iowa Hawkeyes.

Kindler grew up in Minnesota but moved to Connecticut during high school for her junior (1987) and senior(1988) seasons. She graduated from Wilton High School in 1988 and was a former gymnast at Arena Gymnastics in Stamford.
