= Terrell Everett =

American basketball player (born 1984)

Personal information
- Born: July 30, 1984 (age 42) Charleston, South Carolina, U.S.
- Listed height: 6 ft 4 in (1.93 m)
- Listed weight: 182.6 lb (83 kg)

Career information
- High school: West Ashley (Charleston, South Carolina)
- College: SW Missouri St.-WP (2002–2004); Oklahoma (2004–2006)
- NBA draft: 2006: undrafted
- Playing career: 2006–2019
- Position: Point guard

Career history
- 2006–2007: Élan Chalon
- 2007: ČEZ Nymburk
- 2007–2008: JDA Dijon
- 2008: Tulsa 66ers
- 2008–2009: Bakersfield Jam
- 2009: Hyères-Toulon
- 2009–2010: Élan Chalon
- 2010: Iraklis Thessaloniki
- 2011: Cibona
- 2011–2012: Eisbären Bremerhaven
- 2012–2013: Cholet Basket
- 2013: Eisbären Bremerhaven
- 2013–2014: BC Odesa
- 2014–2015: Steaua București
- 2015: Artland Dragons
- 2015–2016: BG Göttingen
- 2017: Lugano Tigers
- 2018–2019: Golden Eagle Ylli

Career highlights
- French All-Star (2007)

Clayton Terrell Everett (born June 30, 1984) is an American professional basketball player who last played for Lugano Tigers of the Championnat LNA. He played college basketball for Missouri State-West Plains and Oklahoma.

== Collegiate career ==
Terrell Everett came to Oklahoma in 2004–05 after a junior college career at Southwest Missouri State-West Plains, where he was a second-team NJCAA All-American. Everett was the starting point guard for the Sooners for both of his varsity seasons, leading the Sooners to the NCAA tournament both years. As a senior in 2005–06, Everett finished third in the Nation in assists with 6.9 per game.

== Professional career ==
Everett went undrafted in the 2006 NBA draft. He played his first professional season with the French team Élan Chalon. In July 2007, he signed a one-year deal with ČEZ Nymburk. In October 2007, he returned to France and signed with JDA Dijon for the remainder of the season. During the 2008–09 season he played in the NBA D-League with the Tulsa 66ers and Bakersfield Jam.

In November 2009, he signed a two-month deal with Hyères-Toulon. On December 28, 2009, he signed with his former team Élan Chalon for the rest of the season.

In the summer of 2010, he signed with Iraklis Thessaloniki of Greece. In January 2011 he moved to Croatia and signed with Cibona Zagreb. He left Cibona after only 3 games. On March 1, 2011, he signed with Eisbären Bremerhaven until the end of the season. In July 2011, he extend his contract with Bremerhaven for one more season.

In September 2012, he returned to France and signed with Cholet Basket. In January 2013, he left Cholet. In February 2013, he returned to Eisbären Bremerhaven, signing for the remainder of the season.

In July 2013, Everett signed a one-year deal with BC Odesa of Ukraine. In March 2014, he parted ways with Odesa.

In September 2014, he signed with Steaua București of Romania. On February 26, 2015, he parted ways with Steaua. On March 9, 2015, he signed with Artland Dragons of Germany for the rest of the season.

On October 29, 2015, he signed with BG Göttingen of Germany for the 2015–16 season.

On January 3, 2016, he signed with Swiss club Lugano Tigers for the rest of the 2016–17 season.
