= Tim McCalister =

American basketball player (born 1964)

Personal information
- Born: November 23, 1964 (age 61) Gary, Indiana
- Listed height: 6 ft 3 in (1.91 m)
- Listed weight: 205 lb (93 kg)

Career information
- High school: West Side (Gary, Indiana)
- College: Oklahoma (1983–1987)
- NBA draft: 1987: 3rd round, 47th overall pick
- Drafted by: Los Angeles Clippers
- Position: Shooting guard

Career history
- 1987: Pensacola Tornados
- 1987–1988: Charleston Gunners
- 1988: Purefoods Hotdogs
- 1988: Jersey Shore Bucs
- 1988–1989: Tulsa Fast Breakers
- 1989: Rapid City Thrillers

Career highlights
- Big Eight Newcomer of the Year (1984); First-team All-Big Eight (1987)
- Stats at Basketball Reference

Tim McCalister (born November 23, 1964, in Gary, Indiana) is an American former basketball player best known for his collegiate career at the University of Oklahoma from 1983 to 1987. He stood at 6'3" and played guard. Throughout his four-year career, he scored 2,275 career points. He also had 628 assists, along with 319 steals. McCalister was selected 47th overall and in the third round by the Los Angeles Clippers in the 1987 NBA draft, but never played in the NBA. He later played in the IBA and overseas in the Philippine Basketball Association (PBA) averaging 25.7 points in his brief three-game stint with Purefoods Hotdogs in 1988.

In high school, McCalister played for Gary West Side High School, playing against other future college and NBA players such as Winston Garland (Gary Roosevelt) and Tellis Frank (Gary Lew Wallace). McCalister finished a degree in broadcasting at the University of Oklahoma, was an outstanding freshman with the sooners in 1983–84, teaming up with future NBA star Wayman Tisdale. In his first year McCalister averaged 16.1 points and 3.8 rebounds, hitting in double digits in 27 of 31 outings. The authoritative Blue Ribbon College Basketball Yearbook said McCalister had "Tremendous quickness and can leap to the ceiling, a powerful body and can pop from long range or drive among the giants... he owns every skill there is in the book."

In the summer of 1988, McCalister played for the Jersey Shore Bucs in the United States Basketball League (USBL). He also played in the Continental Basketball Association (CBA), for the Charleston Gunners, Pensacola Tornados, Tulsa Fast Breakers and Rapid City Thrillers, averaging 13.0 points and 3.2 rebounds over his 72-game CBA career.
