= Sooner Schooner =

Official mascot of the sports teams of the University of Oklahoma Sooners

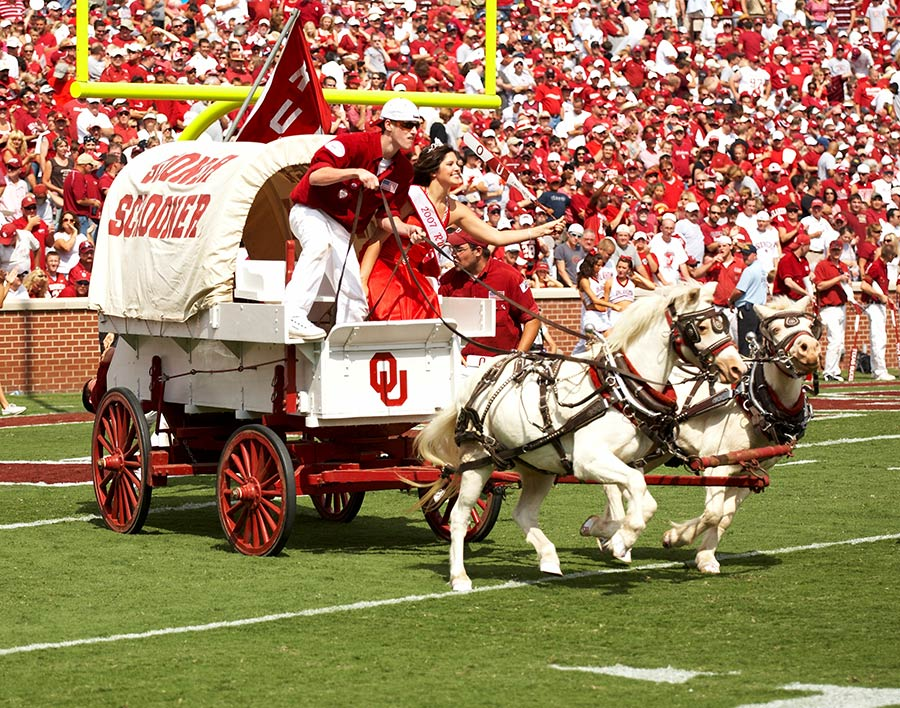
- The Sooner Schooner being driven by the RUF/NEKS at an OU football game in 2007.
- University: University of Oklahoma
- Conference: SEC
- Description: Conestoga wagon
- First seen: September 26, 1964
- Related mascot(s): Boomer and Sooner

The Sooner Schooner is an official mascot of the sports teams of the University of Oklahoma Sooners. Pulled by two white ponies named Boomer and Sooner, it is a scaled-down replica of the Studebaker Conestoga wagon used by settlers of the Oklahoma Territory around the time of the Land Rush of 1889. Its name comes from the common term for such wagons ("prairie schooners") and the name for settlers who sneaked into the Territory before it was officially opened for settlement ("Sooners").

The Schooner is maintained and driven by members of the RUF/NEKS, the university's all-male spirit organization, as well as members of the RUF/NEK Lil' Sis, the university's all-female spirit organization. At home football games and bowl games, the Sooner Schooner is driven onto the field in an arc that almost reaches the 50-yard line after every score. A designated member of either the RUF/NEKS or RUF/NEK Lil' Sis drives the schooner onto the field with a member of the opposite club riding as a passenger. Until the late 1980s, it was customary for the schooner's driver to stand up while driving the ponies onto the field after scores, and duck down only an instant before reaching the stadium tunnel parking spot, barely clearing the tunnel ceiling—a practice eventually ended for safety reasons. The Schooner made its debut at Owen Field in 1964, and it became the university's official mascot in 1980.

== History ==
The Sooner Schooner made its first appearance during a 1964 football game against USC. The Sooners lost that game by 26 points.

Until 2011, when not in use, the Schooner was housed at the Bartlett Ranch outside Sapulpa, Oklahoma, along with Boomer and Sooner.

== The 1985 Orange Bowl ==
The 1985 Orange Bowl, played between the Sooners and the Washington Huskies, is often called "the Sooner Schooner game" because of an incident during the game's second half.

The Miami area had received rain before the game, and the condition of the Orange Bowl's natural grass playing surface deteriorated as the game moved into the third quarter. The game was tied 14–14 when the Sooners lined up for a short, 22-yard field goal which would have made the score 17–14 in Oklahoma's favor.

The kick sailed through the uprights and the Oklahoma sideline thought it was good; the kickoff unit trotted out and the Schooner, as was traditional, also trotted slowly onto the Orange Bowl's wet, mushy field. However, the field goal kick was nullified due to an illegal procedure penalty on Oklahoma. A Sooner player did not report his temporary jersey number to the officials, which he was required to do before the ball was snapped.

The Schooner was already out on the field before the Oklahoma sideline and the RUF/NEKS realized the kick had been disallowed. Worse, while moving across the wet, sloppy natural turf, the Schooner's wagon wheels ended up in a sticky, muddy patch of field and got stuck – right in front of the Washington bench. The Sooners were quickly penalized an additional 15 yards for unsportsmanlike conduct.

What was previously a 22-yard field goal became a 42-yard attempt after the 20 yards of penalties were marked off. The re-kick was blocked by Washington, and the game remained tied. Oklahoma ultimately lost the game 28–17.

Barry Switzer, Oklahoma's coach at the time, said later that he had never seen a flag thrown on the Schooner before or since, "but that wasn't the difference. It would have been closer. But they (Washington) were the better team that night."

== The "Sooner Schooner Mooner" ==
Another incident that drew national attention occurred in 1993 during a game against Colorado. After a field goal by Oklahoma's Scott Blanton, the Sooner Schooner was driven out onto the field in celebration. However, the wagon took a corner too sharply and tipped over, spilling the driver (Scott Gibson), the flag bearer, and the RUF/NEK queen onto the turf. A similar incident occurred on October 19, 2019, during a home game against West Virginia. A new Sooner Schooner was constructed and returned in the 2020 season.

== See also ==
Similar vehicular mascots at other universities

- The Boilermaker Special - A replica locomotive built on a truck chassis which has served as the official mascot of Purdue University since 1940.
- The Ramblin' Wreck from Georgia Tech - A 1930 Ford Model A Sport Coupe which serves as the official mascot of the student body at the Georgia Tech
