= RUF/NEKS =

Spirit squad of the Oklahoma Sooners

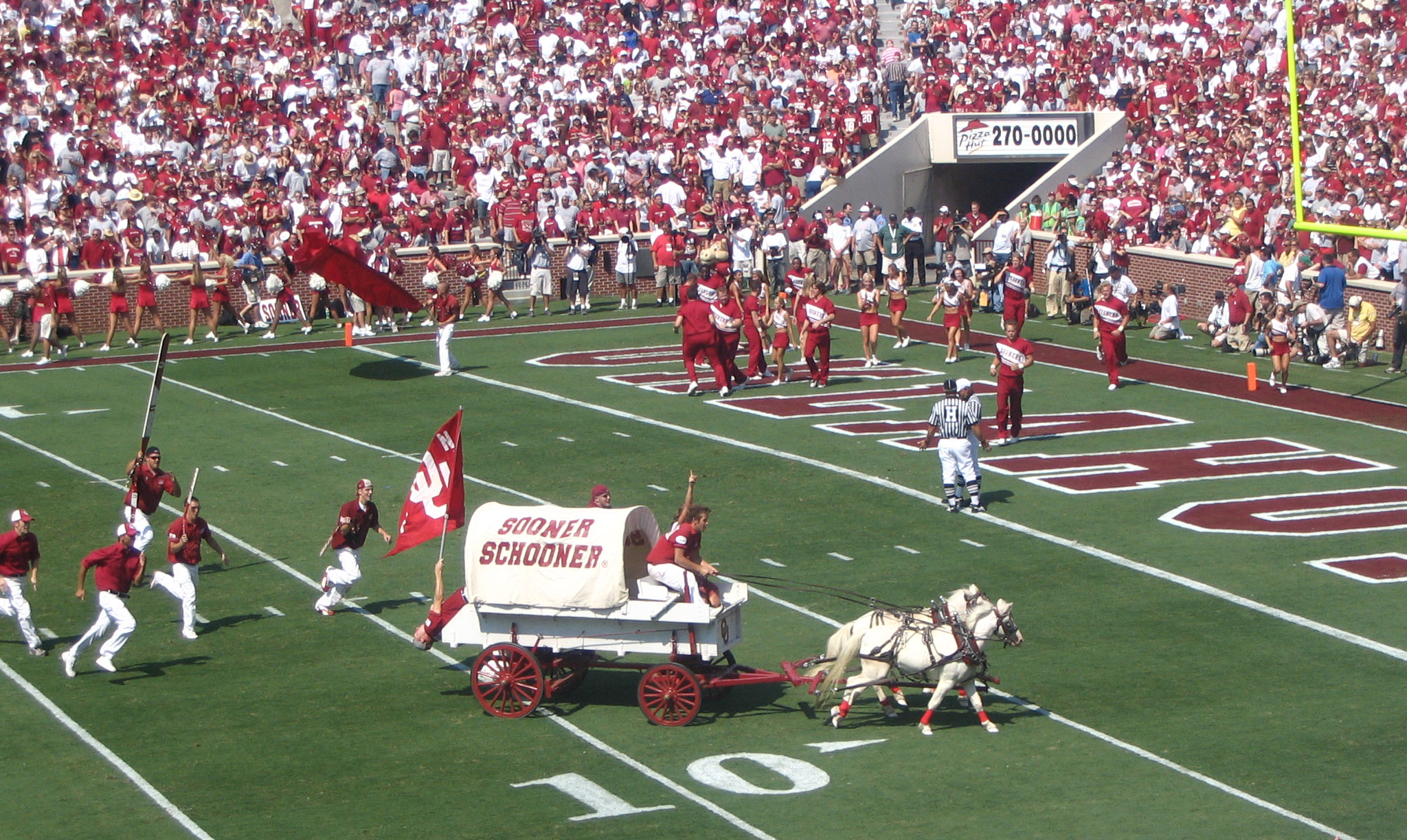
The Sooner Schooner being driven by the RUF/NEKS at an OU football game in 2005.

The RUF/NEKS are the nation's oldest all-male spirit squad of its kind for the University of Oklahoma and the 2nd oldest in the world.

== History ==
The earliest years of this student organization are not well known. The RUF/NEKS began in the late 1910s. In December 1915 at a basketball game between Oklahoma and Oklahoma A&M a group of football players were yelling, cheering, and causing a ruckus. An elderly woman shouted, "Sit down and be quiet you roughnecks!" The name was later changed to RUF/NEKS. The founder of the RUF/NEKS was Charles Leslie High. His most famous act was the "Dallas or Bust" campaign, in which he sold tickets at a cheap price to students who wished to attend the Red River Showdown game against Texas. Unfortunately, this low-cost option is not available anymore.

In 1921, the famous red and white paddles were introduced that have since become a tradition of the organization. Presently, they are carried as a symbol of tradition and pride the RUF/NEKS have for their university. Around this same time, the RUF/NEKS decided to not shave their beards following Sooner losses, this tradition also continues to this day.

In 1923, the first official appearance of the RUF/NEKS was at a Friday night pep rally. This event is now known as the "Big Red Rally" which occurred before the start of every football season until the start of the 2010 season when the University did not have enough funding for it. The group, which was at that time a lot larger than it is today (82 in 1939; the group hovers around a couple dozen today), successfully stopped a group of Oklahoma A&M students from raiding the campus. In 1992, another attempt was made to deface the fountains just west of the Bizzell Memorial Library. The OSU marauders were stopped once again by several RUF/NEKS who were protecting the campus. To this day, RUF/NEKS still stand guard around campus the night before the Bedlam game.

The RUF/NEKS were abolished in September of 1929 after a hazing incident, along with a fellow organization, the Jazz Hounds. The Board of Regents voted to disband the organizations and suspended 54 students between the two, pending an investigation. Following a warning from OU President Dr. W.B. Bizzell to cease all hazing activities, the organizations were accused of defiantly paddling freshman pledges in a secret initiation. In previous years, the paddlings were a public affair as the freshmen were made to march across campus.

The RUF/NEKS and Jazz Hounds were both reinstated on March 23, 1932 on condition that the paddling traditions be banned.

During World War II, the RUF/NEKS were disbanded so the members could join the armed forces. The group was reformed in 1946. In 1952, the FBI confiscated the RUF/NEK ceremonial shotguns. These ceremonial shotguns are used at various times throughout football games including when the team scores, comes out on the field, and at the end of every quarter. All but one was returned and that one is currently on display at the Smithsonian Institution. The use of the ceremonial shotguns is amongst the many traditions carried out by this organization.

Every year, over a hundred students apply to join the group but less than a dozen are chosen.

== Traditions ==
Every home football game when the team runs onto the field, the RUF/NEKS sprint down the field with OU flags, and slide into the goalpost. At the goalpost they say a chant that is named "FADADA". The "FADADA" originated as a ritual to scare snakes out of the endzone during early OU games.

The first appearance of the RUF/NEKS ceremonial shotguns was in 1955, since then, the sound has become synonymous with home football games at the University of Oklahoma.

The most notable job of the RUF/NEKS is the driving of the Sooner Schooner during football games. This tradition started in 1965. The ponies that pull the Conestoga wagon are taken care of by local Oklahoma residents who drive them to Norman. Once there, the ponies are prepped and strapped to the Schooner by the RUF/NEKS. After every OU score, a selected member, called the "Sooner Schooner Driver," drives the Schooner out onto the field to the cheers of 85,000 fans.

Starting in the 1980s, each year on the Monday before the Showdown, the RUF/NEKS apply a fresh coat of paint to the painting in the South Oval that reads "Beat the Hell Out of Texas." Due to construction along the South Oval, this part of the concrete was recently removed to make way for a new pedestrian walkway. The "Beat the Hell Out of Texas" has been moved on campus between Nielsen and Ellison Hall. Once painted, it is expected that the OU Community attempts to keep the painting as pristine as possible so it can be viewed by fans all year long.

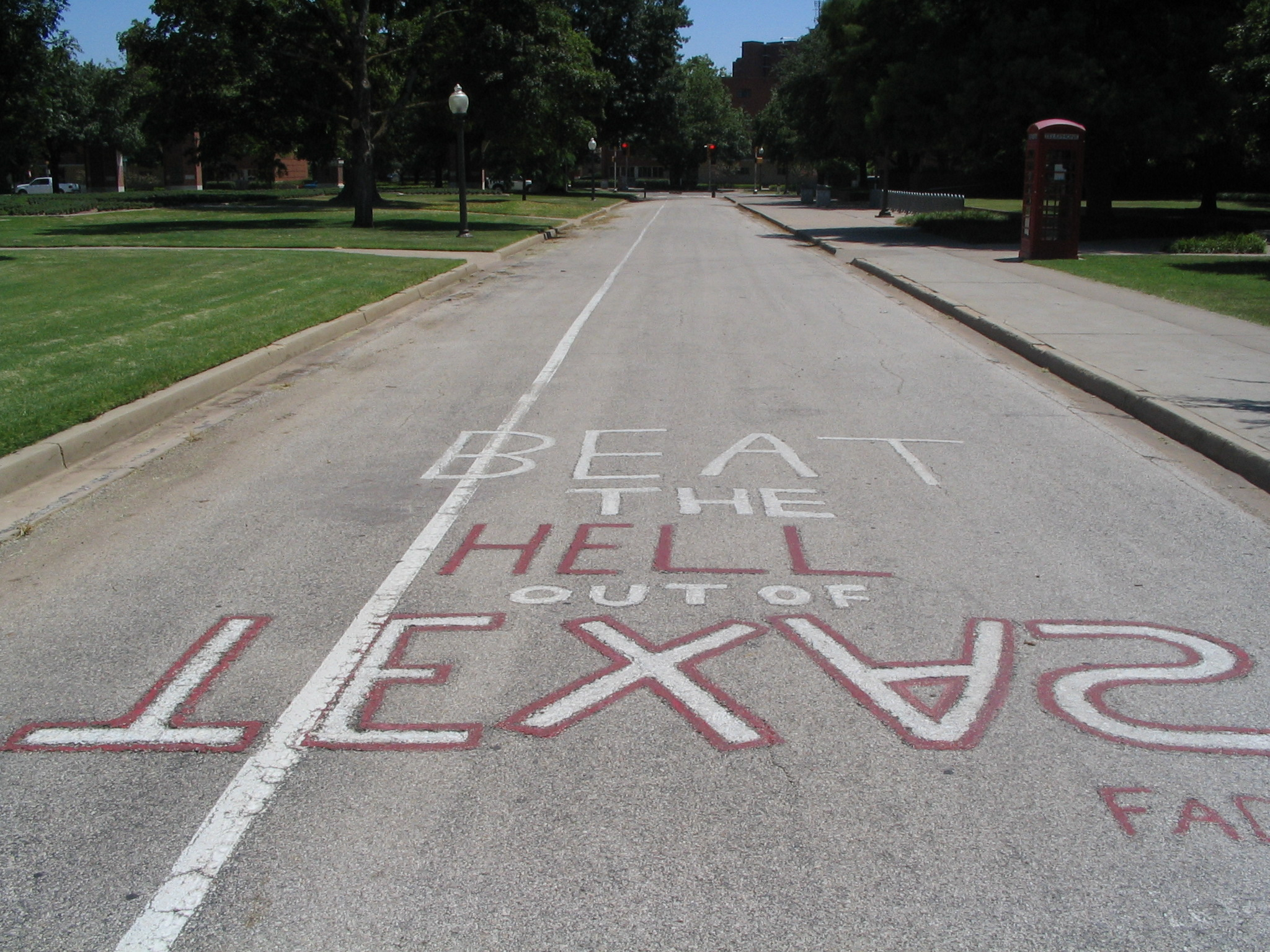
Former location of the Paint Texas tradition.

Every home game, the RUF/NEKS and the Sooner Schooner parade down Lindsey Street several hours before kickoff, greeting and delighting fans from all over with chants to generate excitement through campus.

== Notable Instances ==
Throughout their history, the RUF/NEKS have had their fair share of notable instances.

- In the 1985 Orange Bowl, the Schooner came onto the playing field to celebrate a field goal but received a penalty flag for unsportsmanlike conduct. After the loss of yards resulting from the penalty, the field goal repeat attempt was blocked and the OU football team went on to lose the game.
- They have had to apologize to head coach Bob Stoops twice: once for knocking him down during a pre-game run down the field at the Independence Bowl, and another time for patting him on the butt with their paddles, also during a pre-game run down the field.
- In 2004, during a football game between Oklahoma and Nebraska a member of the RUF/NEKS was injured by Darren DeLone, a 320-pound Nebraska football player. DeLone collided with the RUF/NEK, throwing him eight feet back into a brick wall injuring his head, back and spine and knocking out two teeth. DeLone was charged by the Cleveland County District Attorney's Office with having acted intentionally, but he was acquitted.
- In 2007, all current RUF/NEKS were banned from participating in official University of Oklahoma sporting events. During the 2007 football season, RUF/NEK alumni stepped in to cover games. Following this the organization was placed under the Athletic Department control making it an official University spirit organization.
