= Boomer and Sooner =

Mascots for the University of Oklahoma's sports teams

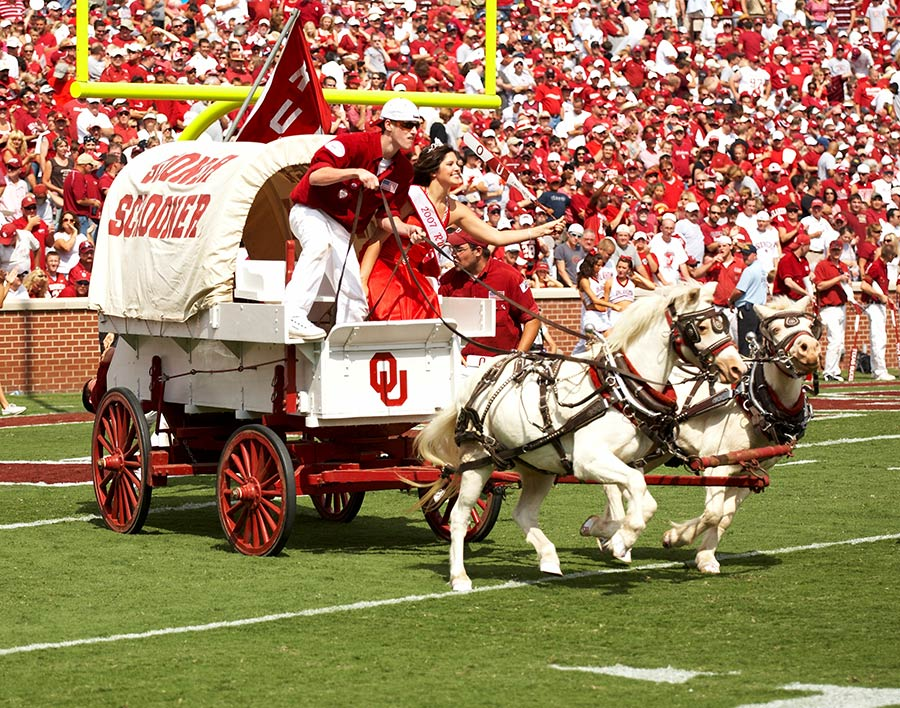
Boomer and Sooner pulling the Sooner Schooner.

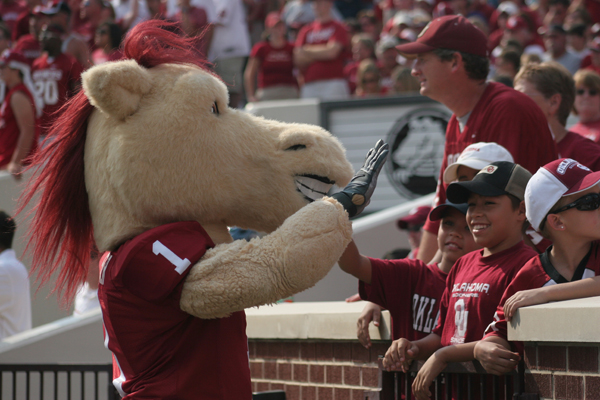
Sooner, the costumed mascot of the University of Oklahoma.

Boomer and Sooner are two matching white ponies who pull the Sooner Schooner, a Conestoga wagon across the field when the University of Oklahoma football team scores. The Sooner Schooner is the true mascot of the team, bringing to mind the pioneers who settled Indian Territory during the 1889 Land Run and were the original "Sooners". The Sooner Schooner represents the University of Oklahoma as a mascot for the university and its sports teams, the Oklahoma Sooners.

== Boomer and Sooner ponies ==
The Sooner Schooner and ponies were introduced in 1964 and became the official mascot in 1980. The Sooner Schooner is cared for, maintained, and driven by both the Oklahoma RUF/NEKS, OU's all-male spirit squad, and the RUF/NEK Lil' Sis, OU's all-female spirit squad. Mick Cottom, a freshman Ruf/Nek member from Liberty Mounds, Oklahoma, has the distinction of being the first person to pilot the Schooner across Owen Field in 1964. Darby Dean became the first woman to drive the Sooner Schooner during the Bedlam football game on November 21, 2020. The Sooner Schooner and ponies were kept at the Bartlett Ranch in Sapulpa, Oklahoma, till 2011 when the university took over the care for the Schooner and ponies. Charley F. (Buzz) Bartlett and his brother, Dr. M. S. Bartlett, organized the Doc and Buzz foundation in 1964 for the purpose of presenting scholarships to deserving students, but the foundation also supports the OU mascot.

There have been five sets of ponies.

- Boomer and Sooner I
- Boomer and Sooner II
- Boomer and Sooner III
- Boomer and Sooner IV (1993–2007)
- Boomer and Sooner V (2008 to present)

Boomer and Sooner V are two crème white Welsh Ponies who were introduced in 2007 to replace the retiring Boomer and Sooner IV.

== Costumed mascots ==
Non-animal mascots were needed to represent the University of Oklahoma at certain athletic contests, charity events and children's hospitals. The Boomer and Sooner costumed mascots represent the University of Oklahoma in these situations. They represent the two crème white ponies that pull the Sooner Schooner, a Conestoga wagon across Owen Field in a victory ride after every OU score. Boomer is the blue-eyed horse and Sooner is the brown-eyed Horse. Traditionally, Boomer wears crimson jerseys and Sooner wears white jerseys that match the team that they are supporting. The mascots replaced the Top Daug mascot at Oklahoma Sooners basketball games. Boomer has competed in Universal Cheer Association National Competition for 4 years, placing 2nd in 2012.

== See also ==
- Boomer Sooner
