= Oklahoma Sooners =

Intercollegiate sports teams of the University of Oklahoma

- University: University of Oklahoma
- Nickname: Sooners
- NCAA: Division I (FBS)
- Conference: SEC (primary); Big 12 (wrestling); MPSF (men's gymnastics)
- Athletic director: Roger Denny
- Location: Norman, Oklahoma
- Varsity teams: 19
- Football stadium: Gaylord Family Oklahoma Memorial Stadium
- Basketball arena: Lloyd Noble Center
- Baseball stadium: L. Dale Mitchell Baseball Park
- Softball stadium: Love's Field
- Soccer stadium: John Crain Field
- Golf course: Jimmy Austin OU Golf Club
- Tennis venue: Headington Tennis Center
- Outdoor track and field venue: John Jacobs Track and Field Complex; Mosier Indoor Track Facility
- Volleyball arena: McCasland Field House
- Colors: Crimson and cream
- Mascot: Sooner Schooner
- Fight song: Boomer Sooner
- Website: soonersports.com

The Oklahoma Sooners are the athletic teams that represent the University of Oklahoma, located in Norman. The 19 men's and women's varsity teams are called the "Sooners", a reference to a nickname given to the early participants in the Land Run of 1889, which initially opened the Unassigned Lands in the future state of Oklahoma to non-native settlement. The university's athletic teams compete in the National Collegiate Athletic Association (NCAA)'s Division I in the Southeastern Conference (SEC). The university's current athletic director is Roger Denny.

SEC logo in Oklahoma's colors

The Sooners have won 47 team national championships. In 2002, the University of Oklahoma was ranked as the third best college sports program in America by Sports Illustrated.

== Sports sponsored ==
Men's sports	Women's sports
Baseball	Basketball
Basketball	Cross country
Cross country	Golf
Football	Gymnastics
Golf	Rowing
Gymnastics	Soccer
Tennis	Softball
Track and field^{†}	Tennis
Wrestling	Track and field^{†}
	Volleyball
† – Track and field includes both indoor and outdoor

The University of Oklahoma was a charter member of the Southwest Athletic Conference (SWC) during its formation in 1914. Five years later, in 1919, OU left the SWC and joined the Missouri Valley Intercollegiate Athletic Association. In 1928, this conference split, and OU remained aligned with the teams that formed the Big Six Conference. Over the next 31 years, more schools were added and the conference underwent several name changes, incrementing the number each time up to the Big Eight Conference where it remained until 1996. Four Texas schools joined with the members of Big Eight to form the current Big 12 Conference.

In July 2021, Oklahoma and the University of Texas at Austin accepted invitations to join the Southeastern Conference after the two universities had reached out to the conference. In May 2023, it was announced that the two universities had approved the necessary contractual agreements with both conferences in order officially join the SEC on July 1, 2024. Oklahoma remains an affiliate member of the Big 12 in men's wrestling.

When combined with Blake Griffin's John Wooden Award and Sam Bradford's Heisman Trophy, Oklahoma became the second school to have a top winner in both basketball and football in the same year (in 1968, Gary Beban won the Heisman Trophy and Kareem Abdul-Jabbar won the USBWA "Player of the Year" award for UCLA).

=== Football ===
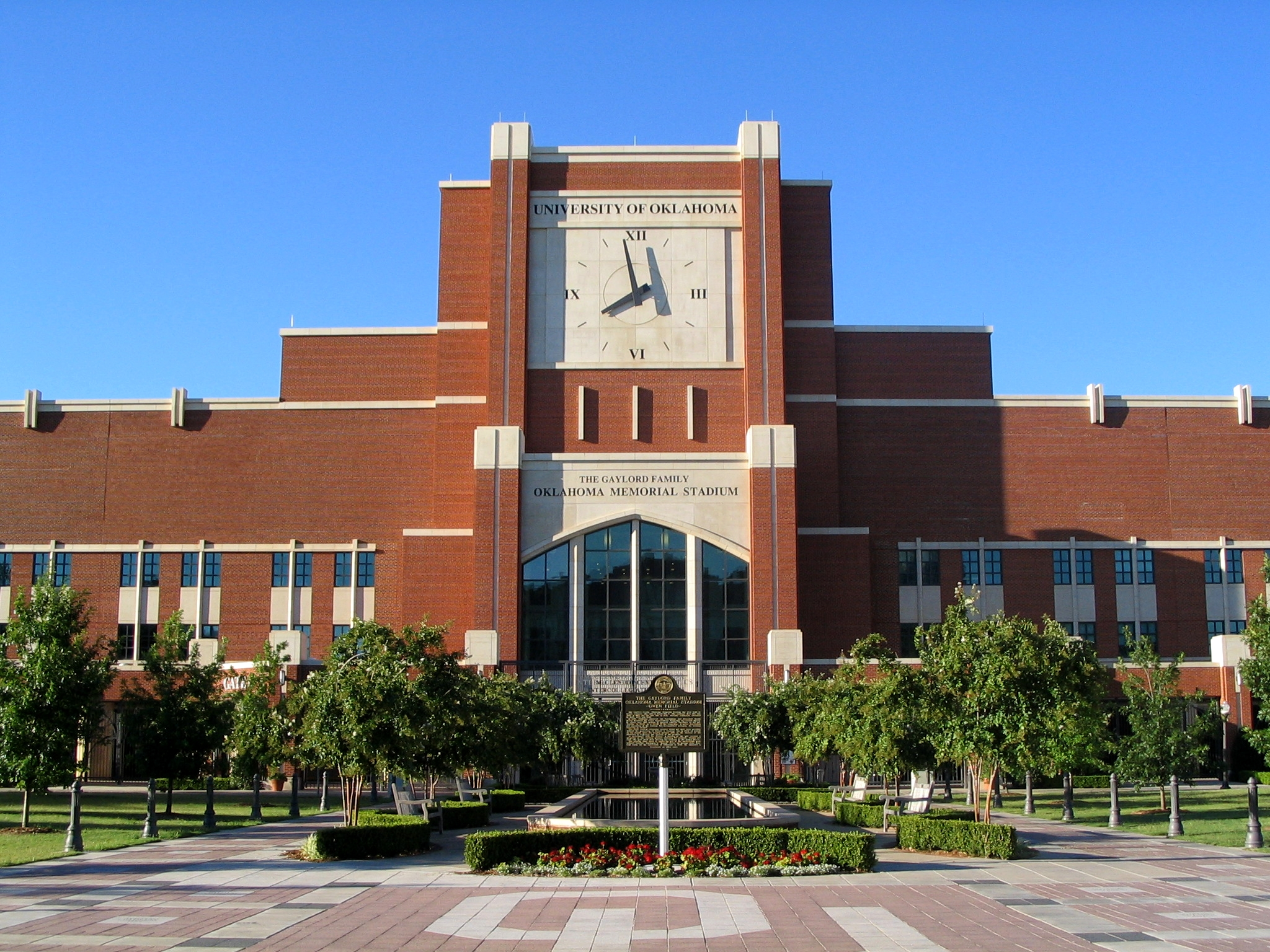
Oklahoma Memorial Stadium

The Sooners have been participating in college football since 1895. Calling Gaylord Family Oklahoma Memorial Stadium at Owen Field home, the team has won numerous bowl games, 50 conference championships (including every Big Seven championship awarded), and seven Associated Press National Championships, making the Sooners football program one of the most decorated in college football. Oklahoma has scored the most points in Division I-A football history despite the fact they have played over 60 fewer games than the second place school on that list. OU also has the highest winning percentage of any team since the start of the AP poll in 1936.

The Sooners possess 7 national championships in football, with 1950, 1955, 1956, 1974, 1975, 1985, and 2000 seasons featuring the top team in the Associated Press final poll, and the 2000 Bowl Championship Series National Championship as well. This number is 3rd only to the Alabama Crimson Tide (12) and the Notre Dame Fighting Irish (8) for the most AP titles of any Division I college football team after the end of World War II (which is commonly used as the division between eras in college football).

In addition to these seven acknowledged national championships there are also ten additional years in which the NCAA's official record book lists other selections (mostly by math rating systems) of the Sooners as national champions, with the first four years in retrospect: 1915, 1949, 1953, 1957, 1967, 1973, 1978, 1980, 1986, 2003. In general, math formula rankings are not recognized as national championships. The University of Oklahoma does not acknowledge these additional "championships", as they were not awarded by the Associated Press, United Press International (UPI), USA Today Coaches Poll, or the Bowl Championship Series (BCS).

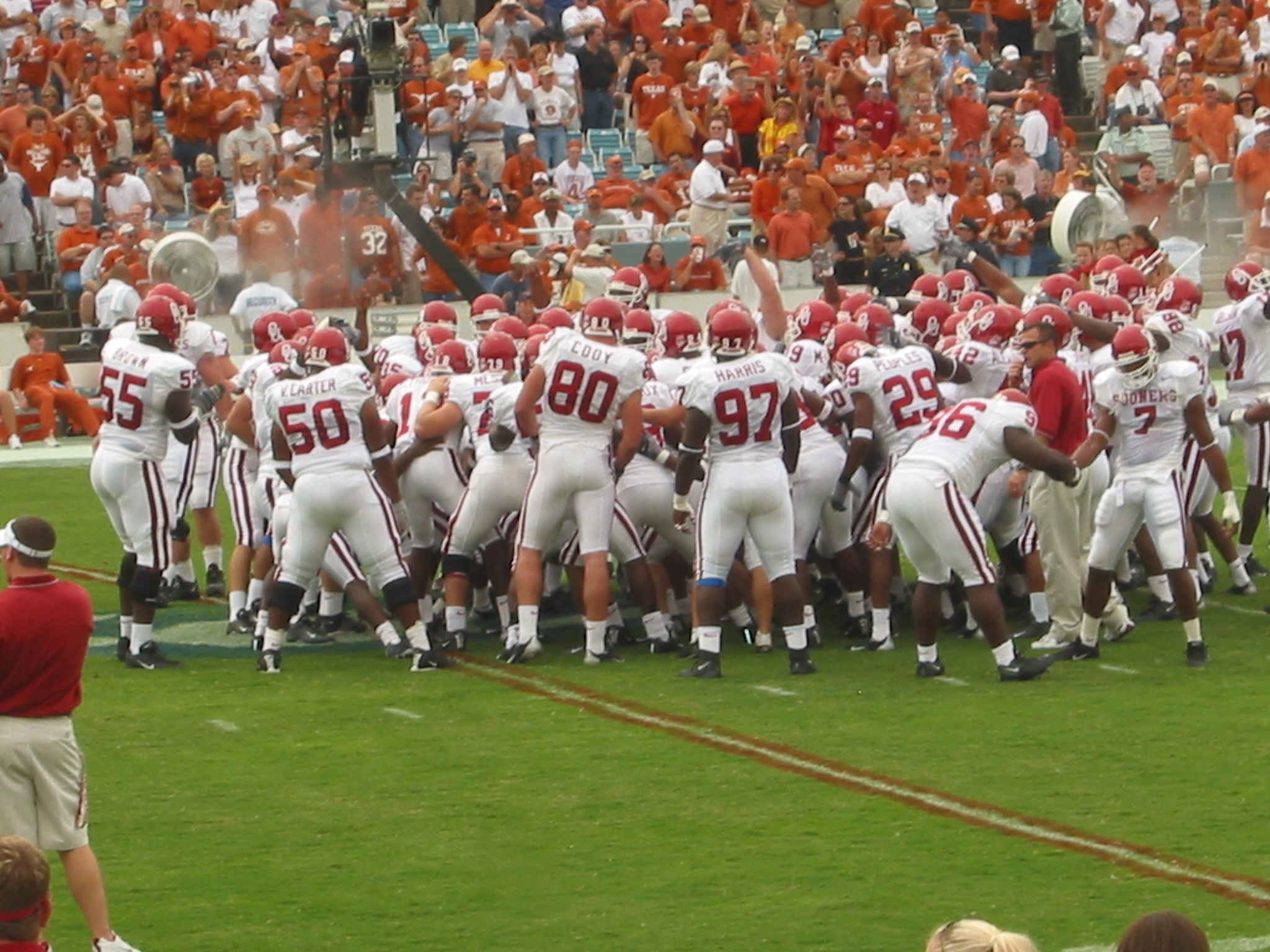
The Oklahoma squad in a pregame huddle, 2006

Individual success is also a major part of Oklahoma football; seven Heisman Trophy winners (Billy Vessels, Steve Owens, Billy Sims, Jason White, Sam Bradford, Baker Mayfield, and Kyler Murray) are surrounded by many other award winners, including NFL MVP Award winner Adrian Peterson, Joe Washington, Brian Bosworth, Tony Casillas, Greg Pruitt, Josh Heupel, Jerry Tubbs, Rocky Calmus, Granville Liggins, Teddy Lehman, Lee Roy Selmon, Roy Williams, Tommy McDonald, Mark Clayton, Tommie Harris, J. C. Watts, Keith Jackson, and Jammal Brown. More than a dozen Sooner players have been inducted into the College Football Hall of Fame. Oklahoma has more Butkus award winners than any other school.

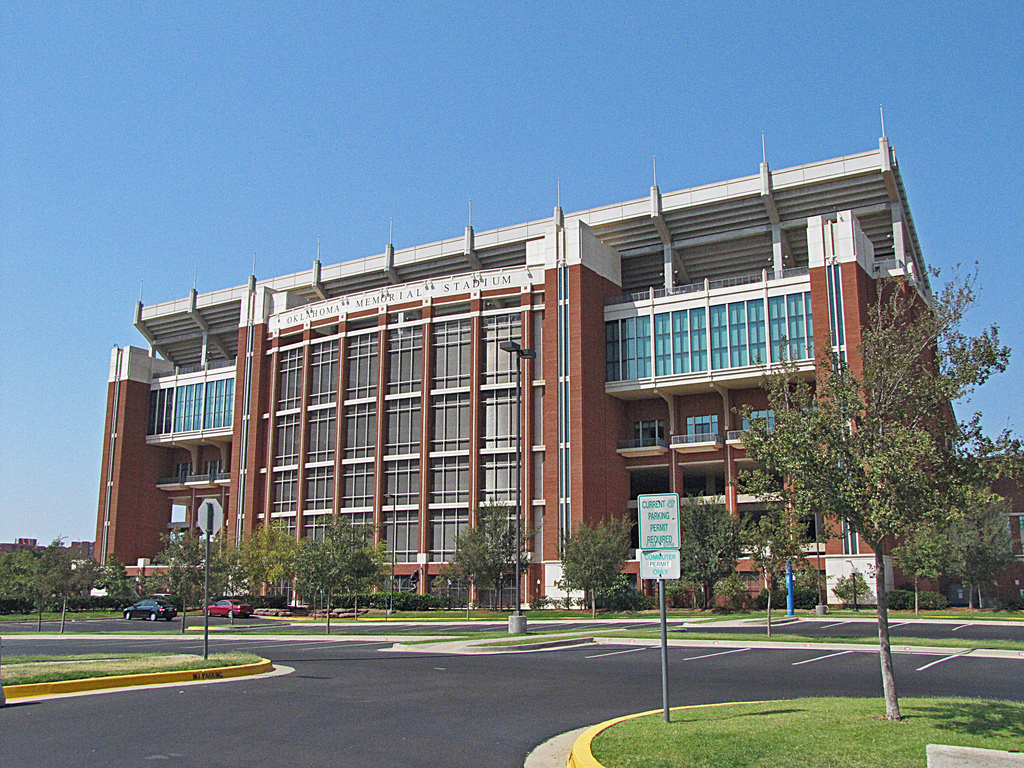
Oklahoma University – Memorial Stadium – Norman, Oklahoma (6088942148)

Coaches Bennie Owen, Bud Wilkinson, Barry Switzer and Bob Stoops have passed through the game-day tunnel for the Sooners, each on his way to the College Football Hall of Fame. Owen was the first highly successful coach at OU and was a major advocate of the forward pass, which at the turn of the century was not popular. The playing surface at Oklahoma's Gaylord Family Oklahoma Memorial Stadium is popularly known as Owen Field in honor of his long tenure and devotion to the university. Wilkinson left many imprints on the game, such as the 5–2 defense with five linemen and two linebackers; the perfection of the Split-T, an early option offense; three national championships; and his teams set the NCAA Division 1 record for consecutive wins at 47 (started October 10, 1953, vs. Texas and ended in 1957 with a loss to Notre Dame 7–0). Switzer won three national championships (the National Championship of 1975 is highly controversial; Arizona State went 12–0 that season while Oklahoma was 11–1) and forged arguably the fiercest rushing offense ever, the Oklahoma wishbone formation, throughout the 1970s and 1980s. Though the end of Switzer's tenure at Oklahoma was marked by controversy and poor player behavior, he is generally well regarded by both his past players and Sooner fans. During his 16 years as the Sooners' head coach, Switzer led his team to 12 conference championships and never lost more than two games in a row. His winning percentage of .837 stands as the fourth-highest in the history of FBS football. Other Hall of Fame coaches whose tenure included stints at the University of Oklahoma are Lawrence "Biff" Jones and Jim Tatum.

=== Baseball ===
The Oklahoma Baseball tradition is long, proud and storied, with two National Championships in 1951 and 1994, along with numerous All-Americans. Their home field is L. Dale Mitchell Baseball Park, named after famed player Dale Mitchell. The current coach is Skip Johnson. The baseball program was a source of recent controversy when the head coach, Larry Cochell, resigned after making racially insensitive remarks about one of the players on the team.

During the 2005–2006 season, the Sooners were given a home regional at L. Dale Mitchell Park and were named the No. 1 seed. They beat the University of Houston, Texas Christian University, and Wichita State University to win the regional and advanced to a Super Regional where they were defeated by Rice University in a best-of-three series. Oregon State University went on to win the College World Series that year.

Prior to 2006, the Sooners hosted regionals at minor league parks in Oklahoma City, first All Sports Stadium and then AT&T Bricktown Ballpark. Scheduling conflicts with the Oklahoma Redhawks, the Class AAA affiliate of the Houston Astros, led OU to bid for future regionals at its on-campus stadium.

=== Men's basketball ===
The men's basketball team is highly successful and rose to national prominence since the early 80s with head coach Billy Tubbs and three time All-American power forward Wayman Tisdale. It currently plays in the Lloyd Noble Center, which came to be known as the house Alvan Adams built and Tisdale filled. While the team has never won a national championship, it ranks second in most tournament wins without a championship behind Illinois. The team played in the 1988 national championship game but lost to Kansas, despite having beaten the Jayhawks twice earlier in the season. The program has won a combined twenty regular-season and tournament conference championships.

The Sooners headed into the 2005–06 season ranked No. 5 in the AP preseason poll, led by Taj Gray, Kevin Bookout, Terrell Everett, and David Godbold, but had a disappointing early season. After the emergence of Michael Neal as a potential star, the Sooners salvaged a No. 3 seed in the Big 12 Conference Tournament but lost in the first round of the NCAA Tournament.

On March 29, 2006, Kelvin Sampson left the University of Oklahoma to become the head basketball coach at Indiana University. 13 days later, on April 11, 2006, Oklahoma Athletic Director Joe Castiglione named Jeff Capel III the new head coach. Capel encountered trouble in his first few months as several players who had been recruited by Sampson backed out of their commitments. Also, under Sampson's watch, Oklahoma was placed under a three-year investigation by the NCAA for recruiting violations. At the end of their investigation, the NCAA issued a report citing more than 550 illegal calls made by Sampson and his staff to 17 different recruits. The NCAA barred Sampson from recruiting off campus and making phone calls for one year, ending May 24, 2007. The Sooners looked to continue a streak of 12 consecutive postseason tournament appearances in 2006–07, but were disappointed when they did not receive a bid for either the NCAA Tournament or the NIT.

In the 2009 NBA draft, the Sooners produced the No. 1 overall draft selection Blake Griffin.

=== Women's basketball ===
OU women's basketball began during the 1974–75 academic year. It wasn't until 1996 when OU hired local high school basketball coach, Sherri Coale, that the team became something Sooners would be proud of. Due to low attendance, a statement was released in March 1990 that the program would be cut, but it was reinstated eight days later after fan response. In that season, the team drew an average of 65 people per game. Now the Sooners are one of the nation's leaders in attendance. In 2002, Oklahoma advanced to the National Title game before losing to the Connecticut Huskies. The Sooners won seven Big 12 titles in the 2000s and became a mainstay in the NCAA Tournament, advancing to the Final Four in 2009 and 2010.

=== Men's golf ===
The men's golf team has won 19 conference championships:

- Big Six/Seven/Eight Conference (15): 1935, 1936, 1938, 1941, 1946–48, 1951–52, 1955–57, 1989, 1992, 1996 (co-champions in 1947 and 1955)
- Big 12 Conference (4): 2006, 2018, 2022, 2023

The Sooners won the NCAA Championship in 1989 and 2017. OU has also crowned two individual national champions: Walter Emery in 1933 and Jim Vickers in 1952.

Several Sooners have had successful amateur and professional careers after college: Charles Coe (1949 and 1958 U.S. Amateur winner), Glen Day (one PGA Tour win), Todd Hamilton (two PGA Tour wins including 2004 Open Championship), Anthony Kim (three PGA Tour wins), Andrew Magee (four PGA Tour wins), Craig Perks (one PGA Tour win), Greg Turner (four European Tour wins), Grant Waite (one PGA Tour win) and Abraham Ancer (winner of 2018 Emirates Australian Open).

=== Men's gymnastics ===
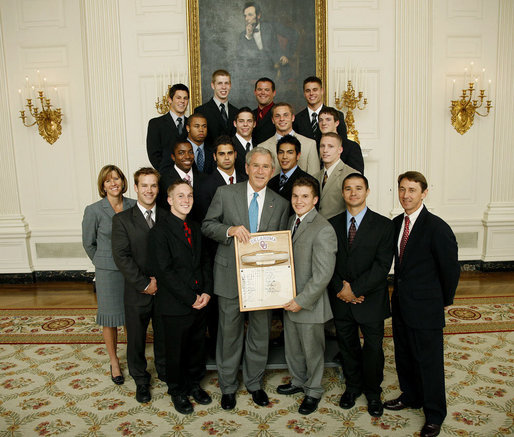
The 2008 Sooners men's gymnastics team, including 2008 Nissen-Emery Award winner Jonathan Horton, are honored at the White House by President of the United States George W. Bush upon the team's winning the 2008 national championship.

The men's gymnastics program at OU is headed by coach Mark Williams. It has won twelve NCAA Men's Gymnastics Championships, which is tied with Penn State for most all time. Their 12 championships include five in a span of seven years in 2002, 2003, 2005, 2006 and 2008 (they finished second behind Penn State in 2004 and 2007). They won the 2006 title with very little experience on the team as 50% of the members were freshmen and just 21% were upperclassmen (seven freshmen, four sophomores, one junior, and two seniors). Teams from OU also won national championships in 1977, 1978, 1991, and became the third program in history to win four consecutive championships when they won in 2015, 2016, 2017, and 2018. In 2015, the Sooners broke the NCAA scoring record in a dual meet against Michigan scoring 456.4 points and then broke their own record two weeks later against Illinois scoring 457.3 points.

Gymnastics began at the school in 1902. The program folded in 1917 when the original coach left. The program was revived in 1965 with the new coach, Russ Porterfield having to beg students to join the squad. Within 6 years, OU had its first winning season. OU's next coach, Paul Ziert, turned the program into one of national prominence. He led OU to two national championships in 1977 and 1978. One of Ziert's athletes, Greg Buwick, would replace him as head coach in 1980 and would lead the team to its third national title in 1991. Buwick's assistant of 12 years, Mark Williams, took over the head coaching position in 2000 and has led the Sooners to six national championships, thirteen conference titles, several individual champions, and even more All-Americans. OU has produced more Nissen Award winners than any other university and is the only school to have back-to-back Nissen Award winners.

=== Women's gymnastics ===
The women's gymnastics program is headed by K. J. Kindler. The Sooners have won 14 Big 12 conference titles, 8 regional championships, and eight national championship titles (2014, a co-championship with Florida and in 2016, 2017, 2019, 2022, 2023, 2025, and 2026). The Sooners have also won seven individual titles in their history, with Kelly Garrison (all-around in 1987; all-around, bars and beam in 1988), Taylor Spears (beam in 2014), Nicole Lehrmann (bars in 2017), and Maggie Nichols (bars in 2017) claiming honors.

=== Women's rowing ===
On May 10, 2007, the University announced the addition of women's rowing to the intercollegiate athletics program started by well-respected rower Candie Garrett. The University hired head coach Leeanne Crain in the spring of 2008. Assistant Coaches Kris Muhl and Andrew Derrick followed Crain from the University of Central Florida to jumpstart OU's program. Muhl took a head coaching position at Jacksonville University during summer 2009. Former UVA rower and Alabama Novice coach Marina Traub was hired as the varsity assistant coach in Fall 2009.

The University of Oklahoma women's rowing team practices in the Oklahoma City River (formerly the Canadian River), located in the Bricktown area of Oklahoma City. The river was designated as a U.S. Olympic Training Center for the sports of kayaking, canoeing, and rowing on July 28, 2009. The University's boathouse was completed in 2011.

=== Women's soccer ===
The women's soccer home ground is John Crain Field in the OU Soccer Complex.

As of 2021 the head coach is Mark Carr, a graduate of Bournemouth University, who was formerly head coach of the United States women's national under-20 soccer team.

=== Softball ===
The OU softball program qualified four times for the AIAW WCWS (1975, 1980, 1981, 1982) and 16 times for the Women's College World Series (Division I) (2000, 2001, 2002, 2003, 2004, 2011, 2012, 2013, 2014, 2016, 2017, 2018, 2019, 2021, 2022, and 2023).

In October 1994, OU hired Patty Gasso as the fifth head coach in program history. In 29 years, she has built OU into one of the premier collegiate softball programs in the nation. Within her first five seasons in Norman, Gasso led the Sooners to the final Big Eight championship (1995) and 15 Big 12 titles (1996, 1999, 2000, 2009, 2012, 2013, 2014, 2015, 2016, 2017, 2018, 2019, 2021, 2022, and 2023).

In 2000, Oklahoma won its first Women's College World Series title by defeating perennial power UCLA. It marked the first national championship by a women's athletics program in school history. OU rolled through the 2013 season en route to its second WCWS title. The 2016 Sooners won the program's third national title while starting four sophomores and four freshmen. Despite entering the 2017 postseason tournament as a No. 10 national seed, OU won its second consecutive WCWS title and fourth overall. Game One of the WCWS champion series featured a 17-inning thriller in which the Sooners defeated Florida 7–5. The 2021 WCWS saw OU drop its opener to James Madison before rebounding to earn a spot in the championship series against Florida State. The Sooners defeated the Seminoles in three games to win the program's fifth national title.

=== Men's and women's track and field ===
The men's and women's outdoor track and field teams host meets at the John Jacobs Track and Field Complex. The men's and women's indoor track and field teams host meets at the Mosier Indoor Track Facility.

=== Wrestling ===
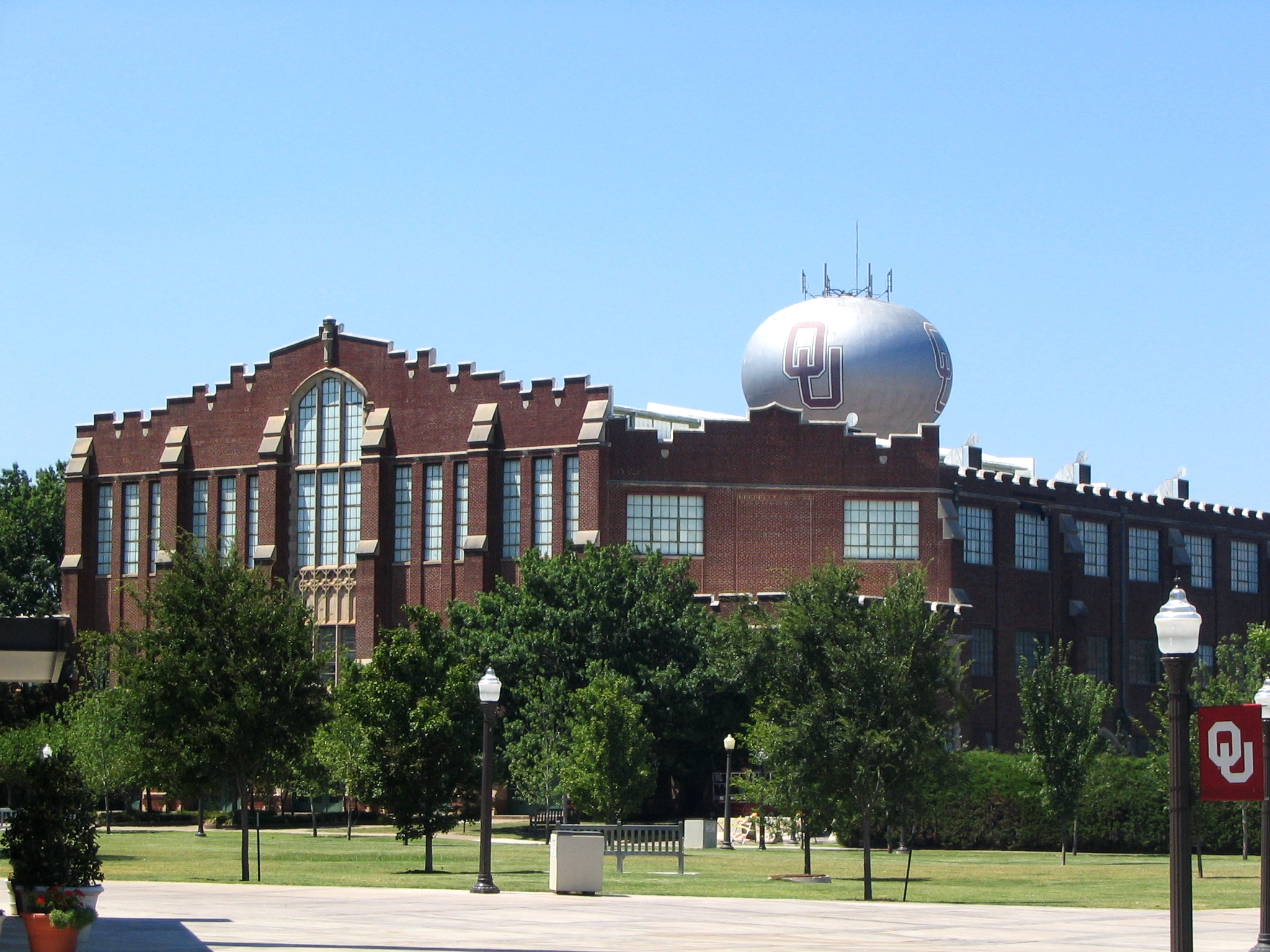
McCasland Field House, home of OU's volleyball and wrestling teams.

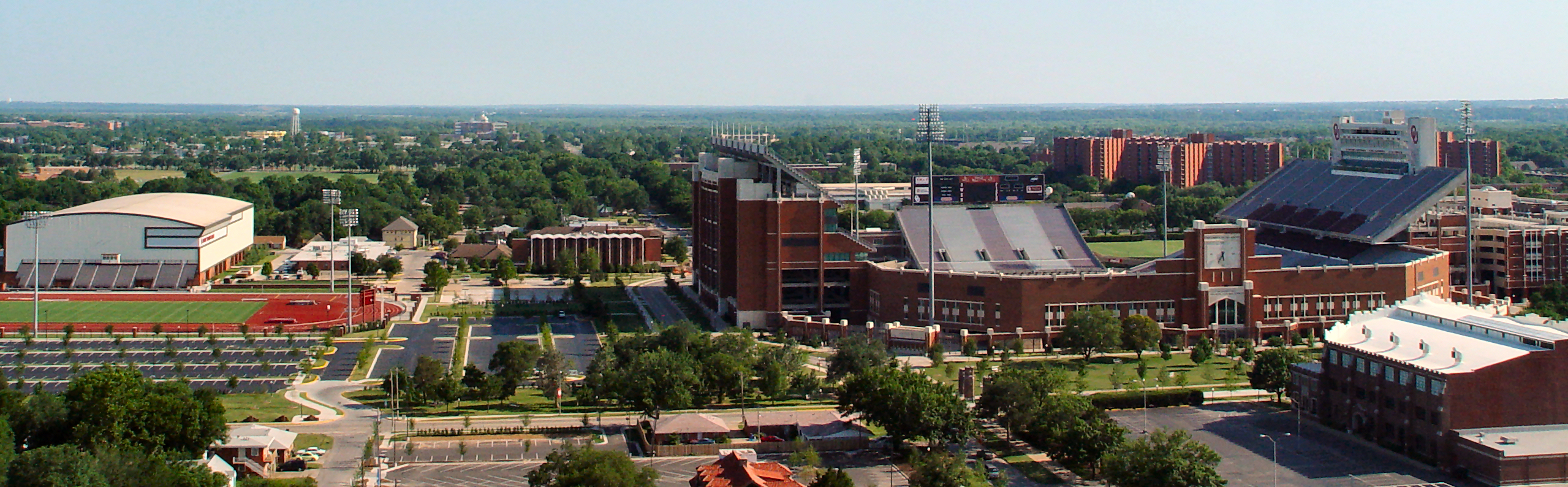
Several of the main athletic facilities at the Norman campus

The Sooner wrestling program was established in 1920 and is the fourth most decorated in college wrestling, having won seven NCAA national championships in 1936, 1951, 1952, 1957, 1960, 1963 and 1974. The Sooners are considered a power in their own right and Bedlam matches draw big home crowds, with the Howard McCasland Field House being the home for Sooner Wrestling.

There are numerous All-Americans and National Champions that have wrestled for the Oklahoma Sooners. Mark Cody was head coach of the program for five years before his resignation in 2016. During his time, Cody coached the Sooners to 10th in 2014. Under Cody, the Sooners had ten All-Americans and two national champions (Kendric Maple and Cody Brewer). Roger Kish took over as head coach in May 2023.

Notable Oklahoma Sooner wrestlers include:

- Wayne Baughman – NCAA Champion and 3-time NCAA finalist, 3-time Olympian in Greco-Roman wrestling
- Bill Borders – NCAA Champion and 2-time National Finalist, competed at 1952 Summer Olympics in freestyle wrestling
- Melvin Douglas – 2-time NCAA Champion, World Champion, and 8-time U.S. Freestyle National Champion and 2-time Olympian in freestyle wrestling
- Tommy Evans – 2-time NCAA Champion and 3-time NCAA finalist, 2-time Olympian and Olympic silver medalist
- Jared Frayer – 2-time NCAA All-American and National Finalist, competed at 2012 Summer Olympics in freestyle wrestling
- Sam Hazewinkel – 4-time NCAA All-American and National Finalist, competed at 2012 Summer Olympics in freestyle wrestling
- Dan Hodge – 3-time NCAA Champion, 2-time Outstanding Wrestler, Olympic silver medalist, and namesake of Dan Hodge Trophy award which is awarded to America's best college wrestler
- Dale Lewis – 2-time NCAA Champion, 2-time Olympian in Greco-Roman wrestling
- Dave Schultz – NCAA Champion, World Champion and Olympic Champion
- Mark Schultz – 3-time NCAA Champion, NCAA Outstanding Wrestler, 2-time World Champion and Olympic Champion
- Wayne Wells – NCAA Champion, World Champion and Olympic Champion

Oklahoma Sooner Wrestling team accomplishments:

- 23 Conference Titles
- 263 All-Americans
- 65 individual NCAA Champions
- 7 NCAA Championships: 1936, 1951, 1952, 1957, 1960, 1963 and 1974

== Notable non-varsity sports ==
=== Rugby ===
Oklahoma plays college rugby in the Allied Rugby Conference of Division 1A. Oklahoma has participated several times in the Collegiate Rugby Championship (CRC), often matching up against rival Texas. The CRC, held every year at PPL Park in Philadelphia, is the highest profile college rugby competition in the US, and is broadcast live on NBC each year.

The Oklahoma University Rugby Football Club was established in 1974. OU Rugby has experienced success since its founding, including an undefeated record in the 1983–1984 season, and reached the national quarter-finals five times from 1980 to 1990. The early 2000s saw Oklahoma return to its winning ways, winning the Big 12 Rugby Tournament four times. The captain of that squad, All American Tyson Meek, played for the US national rugby team, and went on to become OU's first professional rugby player. Oklahoma finished the 2005 season with a 19–1 record.

=== Men's Ice Hockey ===
Oklahoma began playing ice hockey in 2003 and currently plays Division 1 college hockey through the American Collegiate Hockey Association (ACHA) as a founding member of the Western Collegiate Hockey League.

The Sooners maintain annual rivalries with the University of Central Oklahoma and Oklahoma State University.

Oklahoma has participated several times in the ACHA National Tournament. In 2013, the Sooners climbed to the country's No. 2 ranking before eventually suffering an overtime loss in the national semifinals.

== Rivalries ==
=== Nebraska Cornhuskers ===
A traditional college football rivalry with the Nebraska Cornhuskers was much less intense during the Big 12 years than it was in the Big 8 era. This was mainly due to the split-division nature of the Big 12 that only allowed the teams to play each other twice every four years. Prior to this, these teams were involved in several historic match-ups, including the Game of the Century and the so-called Game of the New Century where the teams have come into the game ranked one and two in the Associated Press poll, making the games of great importance in deciding the national championship. Historically, the rivalry's most distinguishing quality has been the grudging respect and appreciation between the two tradition-rich programs. Also of note is the game's former status as the premier Thanksgiving Day game for the middle of the country. The Sooners and Cornhuskers went head-to-head in the 2006 Big 12 Championship Game, with Oklahoma winning the conference title by the score of 21–7. The two teams also met in the 2010 Big 12 Championship Game, with Oklahoma again the victor in a close game by a score of 23–20. This turned out to be the final conference meeting between the two teams, as Nebraska departed for the Big Ten Conference the following season.

=== Oklahoma State Cowboys ===
Oklahoma's shares an intrastate rivalry with the Oklahoma State Cowboys and is often referred to as the "Bedlam Series." It is normally played as a home-and-home series with games alternating between Norman and Stillwater, with the exception of the baseball teams, who often play at Chickasaw Bricktown Ballpark in Oklahoma City or ONEOK Field in Tulsa. Oklahoma currently leads the series 91–20–7 in football, and 136–106 in basketball. In baseball the Sooners trail in the series, 160–189, and in wrestling Oklahoma trails the series 27–128–9.

=== Texas Longhorns ===
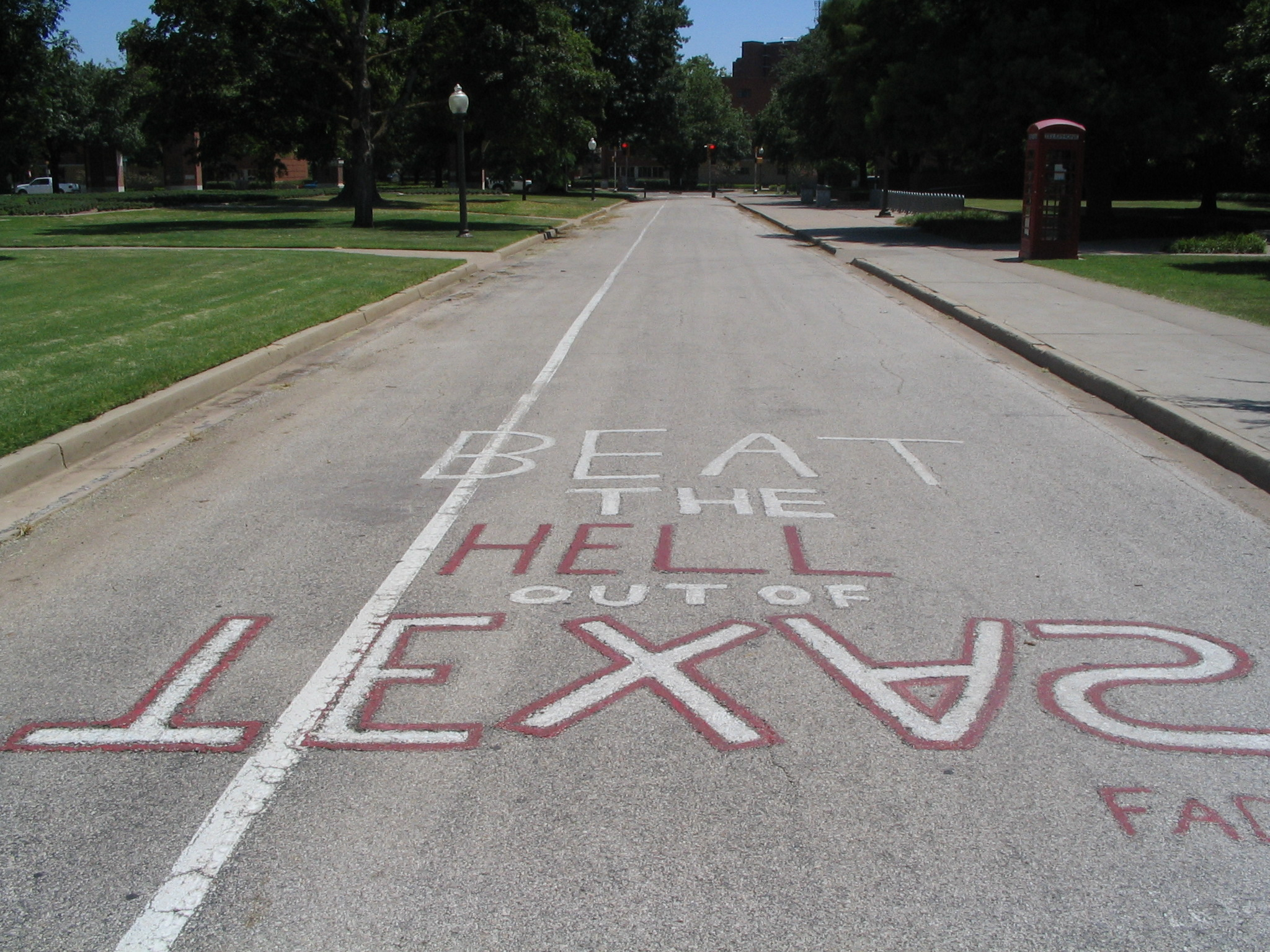
Reminder for OU students of rivalry with the dates of every game for the past 20 years. With construction of a new pedestrian mall, this painting was replicated outside Nielsen Hall close to the clock tower in front of Bizzell Library. Until May 2006, it was located at the South Oval.

The Texas Longhorns are one rival of the Sooners. Regardless of the trademark implications, inverted versions of the Longhorn mascot can be seen on automobiles all over the Norman campus, and many T-shirts referring to the rivalry present the word "Texas" in mirror image, upside-down, or possibly surrounded by obscenities. A reminder of the rivalry shared by these two schools was painted on the South Oval of the OU campus for many years, and was recently replicated near the Library clock tower due to construction at its original site.

The annual game between the schools at the Cotton Bowl in Dallas, Texas, known as the Red River Showdown, is a game that draws attention from all around the college football world.

== Traditions ==
The "fight song" of the University of Oklahoma is "Boomer Sooner", a version of "Boola Boola", the fight song of Yale University, combined with a version of "I'm a Tar Heel Born", the fight song of the University of North Carolina at Chapel Hill. "Boomer Sooner" was written by Arthur M. Alden in 1905. Other songs played at athletic events by The Pride of Oklahoma Marching Band are a version of Rodgers and Hammerstein's "Oklahoma!", "OK Oklahoma", played after extra points, and the "OU Chant." At home games, The Pride of Oklahoma Marching Band plays that visiting team's "fight song" while facing their fans.

The Mascot present at all football games is the Sooner Schooner, a Conestoga wagon, pulled by two crème white ponies, Boomer and Sooner. The caretakers of the wagon are the spirit group called the RUF/NEKS, who shoot off modified shotguns in celebration of scores by the home team. The group was launched in 1915 when an elderly female spectator at an OU-Oklahoma A&M basketball game chided the group for raising hell ("Sit down and be quiet, you roughnecks!")

Recently, in time for the 2005 football season, two new mascots, based on the ponies who pull the Schooner, were created, named appropriately, Boomer and Sooner. They are costumes of two identical (except for eye color) crème white ponies. Before, the Boomer and Sooner costume mascots, OU was also represented by Top Dawg. Top Dawg did some appearances at football games, but was primarily used at wrestling and basketball events.

The official school colors is Crimson, with white, cream, grey, and black used as neutral pairings. The school logo is an interlocking OU design. A stylized version was used from the 1970s through the 2000s, though the traditional version remained on the football team's helmets during this time.

== Championships ==
=== National Team Championships ===
National Championships (47)
Men's (31)
Sport	Year	Head coach	Overall record
Baseball	1951	Jack Baer	16–9
Baseball	1994	Larry Cochell	50–17
Baseball	2026	Skip Johnson	43–23
Football	1950	Bud Wilkinson	10–1
Football	1955	Bud Wilkinson	11–0
Football	1956	Bud Wilkinson	10–0
Football	1974	Barry Switzer	11–0
Football	1975	Barry Switzer	11–1
Football	1985	Barry Switzer	11–1
Football	2000	Bob Stoops	13–0
Golf	1989	Gregg Grost	
Golf	2017	Ryan Hybl	
Gymnastics	1977	Paul Ziert	
Gymnastics	1978	Paul Ziert	10–1
Gymnastics	1991	Greg Buwick	15–1
Gymnastics	2002	Mark Williams	28–1
Gymnastics	2003	Mark Williams	26–0
Gymnastics	2005	Mark Williams	21–2
Gymnastics	2006	Mark Williams	
Gymnastics	2008	Mark Williams	
Gymnastics	2015	Mark Williams	
Gymnastics	2016	Mark Williams	
Gymnastics	2017	Mark Williams	
Gymnastics	2018	Mark Williams	
Wrestling	1936	Paul V. Keen	
Wrestling	1951	Port Robertson	
Wrestling	1952	Port Robertson	
Wrestling	1957	Port Robertson	
Wrestling	1960	Tommy Evans	
Wrestling	1963	Tommy Evans	
Wrestling	1974	Stan Abel	
Women's (16)
Gymnastics	2014	K. J. Kindler	31–2–1
Gymnastics	2016	K. J. Kindler	38–1
Gymnastics	2017	K. J. Kindler	33–0
Gymnastics	2019	K. J. Kindler	32–0
Gymnastics	2022	K. J. Kindler	31–2
Gymnastics	2023	K. J. Kindler	28–2
Gymnastics	2025	K. J. Kindler	33–2
Gymnastics	2026	K. J. Kindler	35–1–1
Softball	2000	Patty Gasso	66–8
Softball	2013	Patty Gasso	57–4
Softball	2016	Patty Gasso	57–7
Softball	2017	Patty Gasso	61–9
Softball	2021	Patty Gasso	56–4
Softball	2022	Patty Gasso	59–3
Softball	2023	Patty Gasso	61–1
Softball	2024	Patty Gasso	59–7

== SoonerSports.TV ==
SoonerSports.tv
- Country: United States

History
- Launched: September 12, 2012
- Closed: 30 June 2022

Links
- Website: www.soonersports.tv

SoonerSports.tv was a streaming network and programming block founded in 2012 to carry University of Oklahoma sports programming. The network was operated by Bally Sports and the University of Oklahoma. SoonerSports.tv focused solely on University of Oklahoma athletics. The network carries live sporting events, game replays, coaches shows, vignettes and historical pieces. The live sports that aired on the network included one football game through pay per view, one men's basketball game, and select games from baseball, softball, volleyball, wrestling, soccer, and men’s and women’s gymnastics.

Select men's and women's basketball games, select softball, and select baseball games, were also distributed to the regional Bally Sports networks and their affiliates as part of the programming block.

The network was created in 2012 as part of an agreement with the Fox Sports Networks. In 2021, following the re branding of the Fox Sports Networks to Bally Sports, Bally Sports took over operation. On May 5, 2022 it was announced that SoonerSports.TV will be ending and will be rebrand as Soonervision on ESPN+ under a multi-year deal with ESPN. .
