= Pi Kappa Lambda =

International honor society for music

- ΠΚΛ
- Founded: May 17, 1918; 108 years ago Northwestern University
- Type: Honor
- Affiliation: ACHS
- Status: Active
- Emphasis: Music
- Scope: International
- Motto: Piero Kala Labein "Strive Always for the Beautiful"
- Colors: Gold and White
- Chapters: 207
- Members: 70,000+ lifetime
- Headquarters: P.O. Box 20598; Saint Simons Island, Georgia 31522; United States
- Website: www.pikappalambda.org

Pi Kappa Lambda (ΠΚΛ) is an international honor society for music. It was established at Northwestern University in 1918. It has chartered more than 270 chapters.

== History ==
Pi Kappa Lambda was established on May 17, 1918, at Northwestern University. Its founders were faculty members Carl Milton Beecher, Louis Norton Dodge, and Walter Allen Stults. The society is dedicated to the promotion of music education in institutions of higher learning. It also recognizes and encourages musicianship and academic achievement in the field of music.

Pi Kappa Lambda was chartered in Illinois in 1918. Stults was its first president, serving from 1918 to 1925. The society held its first national convention at Northwestern University on April 10, 1925. The society is governed by a Board of Regents It joined the Association of College Honor Societies in 1940.

In 2012, the society had 207 active chapters, 1,350 active members, and 70,000 total initiates.

By 2024, it has chartered over 270 in the United States, with 207 being active. Its national office is located in Saint Simons Island, Georgia.

== Symbols ==
The Greek letters Pi Kappa Lambda were chosen for the name of the society based on the initials of its first member, Peter Christian Lutkin who was the dean of the School of Music at Northwestern University. The society's motto is Piero Kala Labein or "Strive Always for the Beautiful".

Pi Kappa Lambda's insignia is a gold key shaped like a Greek lyre with the Greek letters ΠΚΛ at its base on a black enamel background. Above the letters, on either side, are a panpipe and foils, the traditional symbols for music and drama.

Pi Kappa Lambda's seal is a depiction of its key, enclosed with a circle surrounded by a row of stars with the words "Incorporated, A.D. 1918".

Pi Kappa Lambda's colors are gold and white. Its honor stole is gold and features the Pi Kappa Lambda key and name. Its regalia also includes a gold medallion bearing the society's insignia and hung on a white ribbon.

== Membership ==
Potential members of Pi Kappa Lambda are men and women who are juniors, seniors, and graduate students in music majors with superior musical and academic achievements. Senior must rank in the top twenty percent of their class, while juniors must be in the top ten percent of their class. Graduate students must have completed two-thirds of the classes required for their degree with a 4.0 GPA. Faculty are also eligible for initiation into Pi Kappa Lamba.

== Activities ==
Pi Kappa Lambda holds a biennial national convention in even-numbered years, sometimes in conjunction with other organizations. It also sponsors the publication of a series of monographs on American music, grants scholarships and certificates of honor to outstanding freshmen and sophomore students, holds composition contests, and provides other services in its program of activities. It commissions a new musical composition biennially.

== Chapters ==
By 2024, it has chartered over 270 in the United States, with 207 being active.

== Notable members ==
- Nilo Alcala – composer
- Annie Mottram Craig Batten – singer, vocal instructor, and composer
- Martin Bernheimer – music critic of the Los Angeles Times
- Brian A. Britt – assistant professor of music, and director of The Pride of Oklahoma Marching Band at the University of Oklahoma
- Thomas Canning – composer
- Katherine Ciesinski – opera singer
- Ernestine Jessie Covington Dent – pianist
- Jodi DiPiazza- vocalist, pianist, composer, conductor, Singer-songwriter
- Henry Doktorski – accordionist, organist, and author
- Cynthia Folio – composer, flutist, music theorist, and professor of music studies at Temple University
- Julia Gaines – percussionist and director of the University of Missouri School of Music
- Callista Gingrich – documentary film producer, United States ambassador to the Holy See, and United States ambassador to Switzerland and Liechtenstein.
- Tayloe Harding – composer, author, and dean of the University of South Carolina School of Music
- Dennis Hayslett – conductor and formerly Director of Bands at Eastern Illinois University
- Daniel Hersog – jazz trumpeter, recording artist, bandleader, and faculty member at Capilano University
- Philip Jameson – professor of trombone and music at the University of Georgia
- Eunice Lea Kettering – composer and organist
- Marvin Lamb – composer, music pedagogue, and conductor
- Giorgi Latso – concert pianist
- Earle Louder – euphonium player
- Peter Lutkin – organist, choral conductor, composer, and professor and dean at Northwestern University
- Gulimina Mahamuti – pianist
- Oleh Mahlay – violinist, pianist, bandurist, and choral conductor known for his work with the bandura and the Ukrainian Bandurist Chorus.
- Naida McCullough – pianist and composer
- Kathleen McGuire – choral and orchestral conductor, arranger, composer, vocalist, and multi-instrumentalist
- W. Otto Miessner – composer and former head of the Department of Music Education at the University of Kansas
- Maria Newman – violinist, pianist, and composer of classical music
- Matthew Odell – pianist
- Timothy Rhea – conductor and director of bands at Texas A&M University.
- J. Mark Scearce – composer
- James Swearingen – composer, arranger. and professor of music emeritus, chair of the Department Music Education at Capital University
- Elizabeth Walton Vercoe – musician and composer
- Himie Voxman – composer and professor and director of the School of Music at the University of Iowa
- Frances Walker-Slocum – pianist, organist, and the first tenured African-American female professor at the Oberlin Conservatory of Music
- André J. Thomas – composer, conductor, and professor of music at the Florida State University College of Music
- W. Dale Warren – professor of music and senior wind band director at the University of Arkansas
- Laura B. Whitmore – singer-songwriter and founder of the Women’s International Music Network
- Allan Arthur Willman – classical composer and chairman of the Department of Music at the University of Wyoming
- Franciszek Zachara – concert pianist and composer

== See also ==
- Honor cords
