= Oklahoma Sooners football =

Football team of the University of Oklahoma

2026 Oklahoma Sooners football team
- First season: 1895; 131 years ago
- Athletic director: Roger Denny
- General manager: Jim Nagy
- Head coach: Brent Venables; 5th season, 39–24 (.619)
- Location: Norman, Oklahoma
- Stadium: Gaylord Family Oklahoma Memorial Stadium (capacity: 80,126)
- Field: Owen Field
- NCAA division: Division I FBS
- Conference: SEC
- Colors: Crimson and cream
- All-time record: 967–355–53 (.723)
- CFP record: 0–5 (.000)
- Bowl record: 31–26–1 (.543)

National championships
- Claimed: 1950, 1955, 1956, 1974, 1975, 1985, 2000
- Unclaimed: 1915, 1949, 1953, 1957, 1967, 1973, 1978, 1980, 1986, 2003

National finalist
- Poll era: 1985, 1987
- BCS: 2000, 2003, 2004, 2008

College Football Playoff appearances
- 2015, 2017, 2018, 2019, 2025

Conference championships
- SWC: 1915, 1918 MVIAA: 1920 Big Eight: 1938, 1943, 1944, 1946, 1947, 1948, 1949, 1950, 1951, 1952, 1953, 1954, 1955, 1956, 1957, 1958, 1959, 1962, 1967, 1968, 1972, 1973, 1974, 1975, 1976, 1977, 1978, 1979, 1980, 1984, 1985, 1986, 1987 Big 12: 2000, 2002, 2004, 2006, 2007, 2008, 2010, 2012, 2015, 2016, 2017, 2018, 2019, 2020

Division championships
- Big 12 South: 2000, 2002, 2003, 2004, 2006, 2007, 2008, 2010
- Heisman winners: Billy Vessels – 1952; Steve Owens – 1969; Billy Sims – 1978; Jason White – 2003; Sam Bradford – 2008; Baker Mayfield – 2017; Kyler Murray – 2018
- Consensus All-Americans: 83
- Rivalries: Texas (rivalry); Missouri (rivalry); Oklahoma State (rivalry); Nebraska (rivalry)

Uniforms
- Fight song: Boomer Sooner
- Mascot: Sooner Schooner
- Marching band: The Pride of Oklahoma Marching Band
- Outfitter: Jordan
- Website: soonersports.com

The Oklahoma Sooners football team represents the University of Oklahoma (OU) in college football at the NCAA Division I Football Bowl Subdivision (FBS) level in the Southeastern Conference (SEC).

The program began in 1895 and is one of the most successful in the nation, having won 963 games and possessing a .723 winning percentage, both sixth all-time. Oklahoma has appeared in the AP poll 923 times, including 101 No. 1 rankings, both third all-time. The program claims seven national championships (1950, 1955, 1956, 1974, 1975, 1985, 2000), 50 conference championships, 169 first-team All-Americans (83 consensus, 35 unanimous), and seven Heisman Trophy winners. The school has had 31 former players and coaches inducted into the College Football Hall of Fame and holds the record for the longest winning streak in Division I history with 47 straight victories. Oklahoma is also the only program with which four coaches have won more than 100 games each.

The Sooners play their home games at Gaylord Family Oklahoma Memorial Stadium in Norman, Oklahoma. Brent Venables is the head coach and has served since 2022.

== History ==
=== Early history (1895–1904) ===
The first football game in the university's history was played on December 14, 1895, 12 years before Oklahoma became a state. The team was organized by John A. Harts, a student from Winfield, Kansas. Oklahoma was shut out 34–0 by a more experienced team from Oklahoma City in what was the Sooners' only game that season. Oklahoma failed to record a first down throughout the entire game, which was played on a field of low prairie grass just northwest of the current site of Holmberg Hall. Several members of the Oklahoma team were injured, including Harts. By the end of the game, Oklahoma had borrowed members from the opposing squad so they would have a full lineup. After that year, Harts left Oklahoma to become a gold prospector.

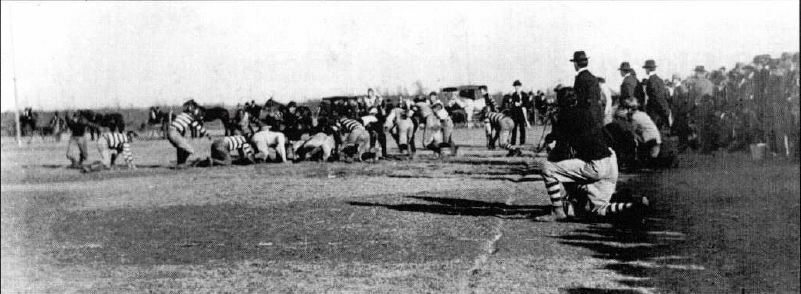
Oklahoma vs. Arkansas City (Kansas) Town Team in 1899 with Vernon Louis Parrington as coach

After playing two games without a coach in 1896, a professor named Vernon Louis Parrington became head coach in 1897. Parrington had played football at Harvard. In his four years as head coach, Parrington's teams compiled a 9–2–1 record. After the 1900 season, football began interfering with Parrington's teaching, and he stepped down as head coach. He would go on to win the Pulitzer Prize for History in 1928 at the University of Washington.

The Sooners had three more coaches over the next four seasons, beginning with Fred Roberts, who led the Sooners to a 3–2 record in 1901. Mark McMahon followed, finishing 11–7–3 in his two years as coach in 1902 and 1903. Fred Ewing followed McMahon, achieving a 4–3–1 record in 1904. The 1904 season marked the first game of the Bedlam Series between Oklahoma and in-state rival Oklahoma A&M. The game was played on November 6 at Mineral Wells Park in Guthrie, Oklahoma, with Oklahoma winning 75–0.

=== Bennie Owen era (1905–1926) ===
After a decade of football, the program acquired its first long-term head coach in Bennie Owen, a former quarterback of the undefeated 1899 Kansas Jayhawks, led by coach Fielding H. Yost. Owen had previously coached under Yost at Michigan, and was the head coach of the Bethany Swedes teams that had defeated Oklahoma in 1903 and 1904.

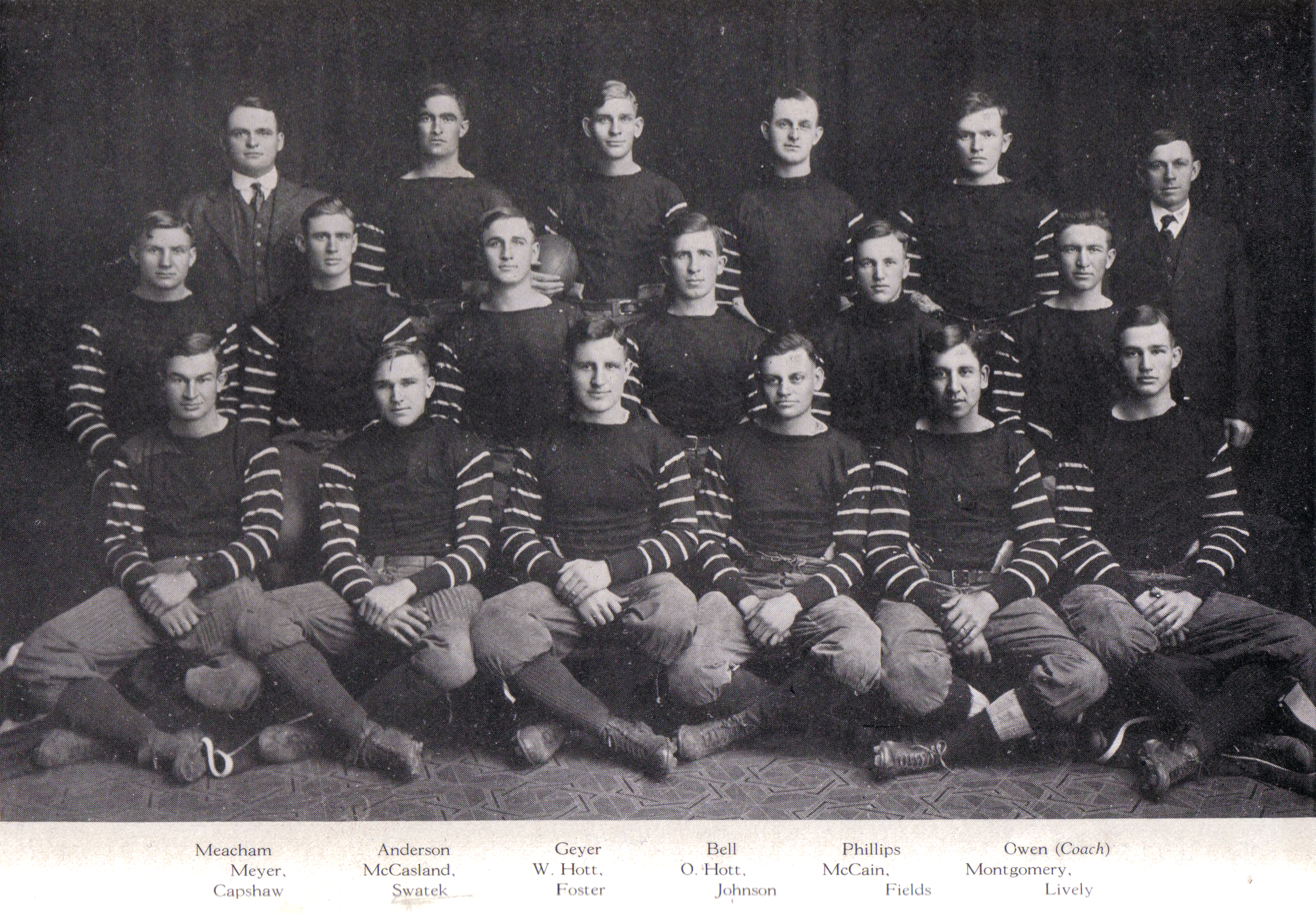
The undefeated team of 1915

Owen's first two years at Oklahoma were spent between Norman and Arkansas City since Oklahoma lacked a large enough budget to employ him all year. As a result of these budgetary limitations, Owen would occasionally schedule up to three road games in a single short trip, exhausting his players in the process. However, even early in his tenure, Owen's teams found success. In 1905, Oklahoma won a 2–0 victory over rival Texas, its first in eight tries. In 1908, the Sooners went 8–1–1, losing only to the undefeated Kansas Jayhawks. Owen's 1908 team relied on hand-offs to large runners, as the forward pass was just becoming common. In contrast, his 1911 team had several small and fast players that the quarterback would pass to directly. That team finished 8–0.

The Sooners had undefeated seasons in 1915 and 1918. In 1920, Oklahoma moved to the Missouri Valley Intercollegiate Athletic Association after five seasons in the Southwest Conference, of which it was a founding member. In their new conference, OU went 6–0–1 and won the conference title. Owen retired after the 1926 season. During his 22-year career at Oklahoma, he went 122–54–16 (.677), won three conference championships, and achieved four undefeated seasons. In 1951, the inaugural year of the College Football Hall of Fame, he became Oklahoma's first inductee.

=== Between Owen and Wilkinson (1927–1946) ===
In 1927, Adrian Lindsey became Oklahoma's first new head coach in over two decades. Like Owen, Lindsey had played football at Kansas and been the head coach at Bethany College. However, he was unable to achieve Owen's success, resigning quietly after a five-year tenure. The Sooners achieved a notable win in 1930, defeating Nebraska 20–7, the Cornhuskers' worst in-conference loss in two decades. Despite this achievement, Lindsey finished an inconsistent stint in Norman with a 19–19–6 record.

Following Lindsey's resignation, Owen, who had remained Oklahoma's athletic director after his retirement from coaching, hired Vanderbilt backfield coach Lewie Hardage as head coach. Upon his hire, Hardage emphasized speed by fabricating new lighter uniforms and trimming the grass on Owen Field. However, in three seasons he failed to produce a successful team. His final record at Oklahoma was 11–12–4, making him the first coach in program history with a losing record aside from John A. Harts, who only coached a single game.

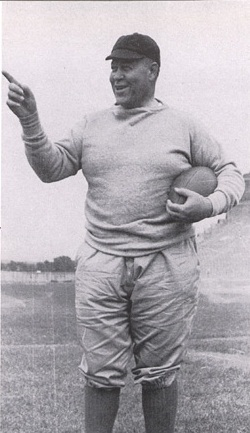
Coach Biff Jones

Although the next head coach, Lawrence "Biff" Jones, went an unspectacular 9–6–3 across two seasons, his impact on the athletic department's administration and finances was significant. Jones was inducted into the College Football Hall of Fame in 1954 following a career that also included coaching stints at Army, LSU, and Nebraska. After Jones' departure, assistant coach Tom Stidham became head coach. In 1938, Stidham led the team to a 10–1 record, a fourth-place finish in the final AP poll, and the first bowl game in school history. However, the Sooners lost the Orange Bowl to Tennessee. Although Stidham's other teams would not be as successful, he left Oklahoma after four seasons with a .750 winning percentage, the highest of any coach since Vernon Louis Parrington (.792).

Stidham left for Marquette in 1941, and assistant coach Dewey "Snorter" Luster succeeded him. After Luster's first season, a 6–3 campaign, the United States entered World War II. Many players left the team to join the military. The Sooners regressed to a 3–5–2 record in 1942, but rebounded to finish 7–2 in 1943 and 6–3–1 in 1944. Luster stepped down after the 1945 season due to ill health. He recorded a 27–18–3 record in five seasons at Oklahoma, winning two conference titles. His teams never finished below second place in the Big Six.

After Luster's resignation, several candidates were interviewed for the head coaching job, Jim Tatum among them. Tatum was joined at his interview by his assistant, Bud Wilkinson, with whom athletic director Lawrence Haskell was more impressed. However, it was decided that usurping Tatum and giving the job to Wilkinson would be unethical. OU hired Tatum as head coach, with Wilkinson joining the staff as an assistant. The Sooners went 8–3 in 1946, including a 73–12 Bedlam Series win and a victory over NC State in the Gator Bowl. Tatum left Oklahoma after one season to accept the head coach position at Maryland.

=== Bud Wilkinson era (1947–1963) ===
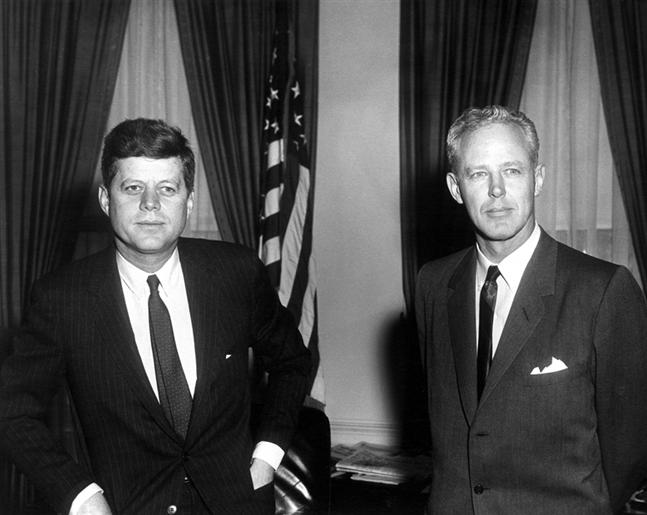
Coach Wilkinson with President John F. Kennedy at the White House in 1961

Following Tatum's departure, Bud Wilkinson was promoted to head coach. In his first season, the Sooners went 7–2–1 and shared the conference title with Kansas for the second year in a row. Over the next two years, Oklahoma lost only a single game and went undefeated in conference play, winning two straight Sugar Bowls. In 1949, despite going undefeated and winning the Sugar Bowl, the Sooners were not awarded the national championship, which went to the Notre Dame Fighting Irish.

In 1950, Wilkinson guided the Sooners to their first national championship, though they lost the Sugar Bowl to Bear Bryant's Kentucky Wildcats. At the time, the AP and Coaches Polls selected their champions prior to bowl games. The loss snapped a 31-game winning streak that dated back to 1948's season-opening loss to Santa Clara. The team's success began to influence the culture of football at the university. "People talk a lot about the tradition of football at Oklahoma. The person who started that tradition was Bud Wilkinson," Oklahoma native and Hall of Fame wide receiver Steve Largent later said. In 1951, while seeking funding to improve the school, university president George Lynn Cross told the Oklahoma legislature that he "would like to build a university of which the football team would be proud."

In 1952, Oklahoma had its first Heisman Trophy winner in halfback Billy Vessels, a local player from Cleveland, Oklahoma. Vessels became the first thousand-yard rusher to win the Heisman and scored 18 touchdowns for the Sooners, who finished 8–1–1. Their only loss that season came on the road to Notre Dame. The 1953 team would open the season with a loss to the Fighting Irish and a tie with Pitt.

==== 47-game winning streak ====
The Sooners went undefeated for the remainder of the 1953 season, culminating in an Orange Bowl victory over national champion Maryland, coached by Jim Tatum. OU went 10–0 in 1954 and 11–0 in 1955, concluding the latter season with another Orange Bowl win over Tatum's Terrapins. The Sooners won the national championship in 1955 and 1956, when they went 10–0, including a 40–0 rout of Notre Dame that marked the 35th win in the streak. From 1954 to 1956, Jimmy Harris made 25 starts at quarterback for the Sooners and never lost a game. Along with Chuck Ealey of Toledo, Harris is one of only two quarterbacks in FBS history to start at least 25 games without losing.

At the start of the 1957 season, with the streak standing at 40 games, speculation arose that the team was not as good as it had been in previous years, having lost 18 lettermen from 1956. Wilkinson commented that "this year we'll have to work faster and organize better than ever before." The Sooners won their first seven games that year, but fell to Notre Dame on November 16, suffering their first defeat in more than four years.

The record of 47 consecutive wins has never been seriously threatened; since it ended, no FBS school has achieved a streak longer than 35 wins. During the streak, the Sooners outscored their opponents 1620–269 and recorded 23 shutouts. In addition to their back-to-back national championships during the streak, the Sooners won 14 straight conference titles from 1946 to 1959, one under Jim Tatum and 13 under Wilkinson. Oklahoma went undefeated in conference play from November 23, 1946, to October 31, 1959, their record only blemished by two ties.

==== Dominance and decline ====
Wilkinson's best teams came during the first 11 years of his tenure. In that time, he recorded winning streaks of 31 and 47 games, respectively, and went 114–10–3 for a .909 winning percentage. After a pair of one-loss seasons in 1957 and 1958, the Sooners fell to 7–3 in 1959, then 3–6–1 in 1960. Oklahoma finished that season unranked, the first time that they had done so under Wilkinson. After an unranked finish in 1961, the Sooners rebounded to secure the Big 8 championship in 1962. Wilkinson retired from coaching after the 1963 season, finishing with a record of 145–29–4, 14 conference titles, and 123 straight games without being shut out. He was elected to the College Football Hall of Fame in 1969.

==== Prentice Gautt ====
During Wilkinson's tenure, Prentice Gautt became the first black football player at the University of Oklahoma. Gautt had been a superior student at Douglass High School in Oklahoma City, where during his junior and senior years he had helped his team amass a 31-game winning streak. He was also the first black player to participate in the Oklahoma state all-star game. Some members of Gautt's team did not want to play with him; one player even left Oklahoma because he refused to play with an African American. However, most of the team had his support. After a freshman game in Tulsa, when Gautt was refused service at a restaurant, his teammates left and found a restaurant that would serve him. Gautt was twice named to the All-Conference team and scored a touchdown in the 1959 Orange Bowl.

=== Jones, Mackenzie, and Fairbanks (1964–1972) ===
Coach Gomer Jones, pictured in 1929

Following Wilkinson's retirement, his assistant coach, Gomer Jones, was promoted to head coach, a move endorsed by Wilkinson. Jones' first year was a sharp contrast from Wilkinson's early years; the Sooners went 6–4–1. Less than a month before the team's Gator Bowl loss to Florida State, it was discovered that four starters had signed professional football contracts before their college eligibility had expired, and they were dismissed from the team.

Following a 3–7 season in his second year as head coach, Oklahoma's worst record since its inaugural season in 1895, Jones was replaced by Arkansas assistant Jim Mackenzie. Seeking discipline from his players, Mackenzie set a curfew and required them to enroll in a physical education class. His first team went 6–4, including a win in the Red River Rivalry over a Texas team coached by former Oklahoma defensive back Darrell Royal. This was their first win over Texas since 1957. They also beat fourth ranked Nebraska 10–9. On April 28, 1967, Mackenzie died of a heart attack at age 37.

Assistant coach Chuck Fairbanks succeeded Mackenzie, and in 1967, the Sooners went 10–1, including a win over second-ranked Tennessee in the Orange Bowl. The Sooners finished the season ranked third in the country. The Sooners lost four games in each of the next three seasons, with highlights including Steve Owens becoming the Sooners' second Heisman Trophy winner in 1969.

==== The wishbone offense ====
A variant of the wishbone formation with two wide receivers (WR). At Oklahoma, Barry Switzer's wishbone formation used one wide receiver (also known as a split end) and one tight end.

In the 1970s, several college football teams began implementing the wishbone offense, a run-based scheme designed to expand the possibilities of the option offense by placing three rushers in the backfield behind the quarterback. In a traditional option play, the quarterback determines which rusher carries the ball by reading the alignment of the defense. The wishbone relies on the triple option, in which the quarterback has three potential candidates to carry the ball (himself and two backfield rushers). One innovation of the wishbone was to place a third rusher in the backfield to serve as a lead blocker. Head coach Fairbanks and offensive coordinator Barry Switzer were among the early adopters of the wishbone and used it to widespread success. Their 1970 team tied an Alabama squad that also used the wishbone in the Astro-Bluebonnet Bowl. During the next season, the Sooners beat No. 17 USC, No. 3 Texas and No. 6 Colorado in consecutive weeks. After these wins, Oklahoma was ranked second in the country ahead of a "Game of the Century" matchup against top-ranked Nebraska. On November 25, Nebraska edged Oklahoma, 35–31, Oklahoma's only loss of the season. Nebraska went on to win the national championship with a 13–0 record, while Oklahoma went on to beat No. 5 Auburn in the Sugar Bowl to finish the season ranked second. Led by quarterback Jack Mildren and running back Greg Pruitt, Oklahoma's wishbone offense averaged 44.5 points per game, at the time the second most in team history. The offense gained 472.36 rushing yards per game, an FBS record that still stands. Pruitt averaged nine yards per carry, and Mildren's performance led to his adopting the moniker "the Godfather of the Wishbone."

In 1972, the Sooners went 11–1 and finished the year at No. 2 after a Sugar Bowl victory over Penn State. Following the season, Fairbanks left Oklahoma to become the head coach of the New England Patriots.

=== Barry Switzer era (1973–1988) ===
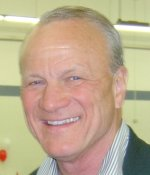
Coach Switzer, pictured in 2006

Switzer ascended to head coach following the departure of Fairbanks. His tenure began with a scandal when the university self-reported violations involving the alteration of a player's high school transcript. Although the Sooners forfeited eight games from the 1972 season, the university now recognizes the wins and the Big Eight Conference championship won that year.

The Big Eight punished the team with a two-year bowl ban beginning in 1973 and a two-year ban on television appearances beginning in 1974. During the next three years, Oklahoma went 32–1–1 and won three straight conference championships. They claimed back-to-back national championships in 1974 and 1975, the two years in which they could not appear on television during the regular season. As it was a postseason game, NBC aired Oklahoma's 1976 Orange Bowl win over Michigan, which secured the team's fifth national championship.

Oklahoma performed exceptionally well during their probation. In 1973, the Sooners played seven ranked teams, beat six of them, tied No. 1 USC, and finished the year undefeated. In 1974, the run-heavy wishbone offense averaged 43 points per game and set an FBS record that still stands with 73.91 rushing attempts per game. In both 1974 and 1975, the team had six players rush for over 300 yards, with Joe Washington leading the team in rushing and earning All-America honors in both seasons. Due to the frequency of quarterback rushes in the wishbone, signal caller Steve Davis rushed for more yards than he passed in both seasons.

Following the 1975 season, several key players left the team. Defensive tackle Lee Roy Selmon was selected first overall in the 1976 NFL draft, and Washington was taken three picks later. Davis departed and was replaced at quarterback by Dean Blevins, who was unable to match his predecessor's contributions in the running game. In 1978, Oklahoma would get their third Heisman Trophy winner in running back Billy Sims, who rushed for 1,896 yards and broke the Big Eight regular season rushing record. The Sooners finished third in the final AP poll after an Orange Bowl victory over Nebraska, the closest they came to a national championship in the second half of the 1970s. Despite never losing more than two games in any season during these years, Oklahoma never finished in the top two in the final AP poll.

During the 1970s, Switzer's teams went 73–7–2 in seven years, and the Sooners won the Big Eight every year from 1972 to 1980. However, during the early 1980s, the team's performance worsened. They lost four games each year from 1981 through 1983. In 1984, the team improved to 9–2–1 and defeated top-ranked Nebraska. The win allowed Oklahoma to claim a share of the Big Eight championship and receive an Orange Bowl bid against Washington, a game they subsequently lost.

Switzer's teams returned to contention for the national championship during the next three seasons, earning an 11–1 record and a Big Eight title in each. However, in all three years, the Sooners lost to Miami. In 1985, the Sooners won the national championship despite their loss, rebounding to defeat top-ranked Penn State in the Orange Bowl. In 1986, the Sooners won another Orange Bowl but finished No. 3 behind Penn State and Miami, who had faced each other for the national championship in the Fiesta Bowl. In 1987, the Sooners played in two No. 1 vs. No. 2 games in a row, defeating top-ranked Nebraska to end their regular season undefeated before facing Miami in the Orange Bowl to decide the national title. The Hurricanes defeated the Sooners, who had risen to the top of the polls following the Nebraska game, 20–14. In 1988, the Sooners finished 9–3, with highlights including a 70–24 win against Kansas State in which the team rushed for 768 yards, which remains an FBS record.

Switzer's tenure ended in scandal. After the 1988 season, the NCAA placed the Sooners on probation for violating several rules, including offering improper benefits to players and recruits. In one example, a recruit was offered $1,000 to enroll at the university. It was determined that Switzer had personally paid for rental cars for students entertaining recruits on campus. Meanwhile, several of his players were in trouble with the law. Despite knowing that certain players had problems with alcohol or drugs, Switzer had recruited them anyway due to their talent. Notable players Charles Thompson and Brian Bosworth were found to be involved with drugs or steroids. On multiple occasions, players were caught attempting to sell cocaine to undercover agents. A shooting and a gang rape took place in the athletic dorm within eight days of each other; two players were later convicted for the rape. Former Sooner Jim Riley later said that amid the turmoil, "Barry was just trying to keep it together."

The probation lasted three years, including a two-year bowl ban, a one-year television ban, and a two-year reduction in scholarships. Facing immense pressure to resign, Switzer stepped down as head coach in 1989. He finished his tenure in Norman with a 157–29–4 record, an .837 winning percentage, 12 conference championships, and three national titles.

=== Gibbs, Schnellenberger, and Blake (1989–1998) ===
Switzer's ouster marked the beginning of what Stan Dorsey, writing for The Sporting News, called "a pratfall of unspeakable scope and unfathomable dimension" for the Sooners. Defensive coordinator Gary Gibbs was promoted to head coach. At the time, Gibbs had spent his entire adult life in Norman as a player (1971–1974), graduate assistant (1975–1977), full-time assistant (1978–1980) and defensive coordinator (1981–1988). Dorsey characterized Gibbs as being uncomfortable around alumni and the media, as well as with being a head coach in general. During his six-year tenure, while Oklahoma attempted to recover from probation, the team finished a combined 44–23–2, never reaching higher than second in the conference or No. 16 in the final AP poll. Gibbs punctuated a middling record with losses to Oklahoma's rivals; the Sooners went a combined 2–15–1 against Texas, Nebraska, and Colorado during his tenure. He announced his resignation prior to the end of the 1994 season.

Gibbs was replaced by Howard Schnellenberger, whose resume included a national championship at Miami. Convinced that the 1994 Copper Bowl loss to BYU was "clearly the lowest point in the great history of Oklahoma football," Schnellenberger sought to reshape the program, beginning by ordering files from previous seasons to be thrown out. Instead, they were archived without his knowledge. Schnellenberger often said that "they will write books and make movies about my time [at Oklahoma]," and his first team started out well. The Sooners rose to No. 10 in the AP poll after three wins to begin the 1995 season, but a home loss to fourth-ranked Colorado started a 2–5–1 stretch to finish the year. The season ended with shutout losses to Oklahoma State and national champions Nebraska. Schnellenberger resigned after one season, having failed to live up to his own expectations for success.

Oklahoma then hired former player John Blake as head coach. Although he was Switzer's preferred candidate, Blake had very little experience, having spent his entire career as a position coach. In the 101 years preceding Blake's hire, Oklahoma had nine losing seasons. Under Blake, the Sooners had three losing seasons in three years. The team's eight losses in 1996 set a team record that was matched the following season. Blake's 12–22 record gave him the worst winning percentage of any Oklahoma head coach since the single-game tenure of John A. Harts in 1895. He was fired after presiding over the worst three-year stretch in team history.

Despite his poor record as head coach, Blake contributed to success after his tenure by recruiting several players who would help the program's resurgence under his successor, Bob Stoops. Among them were future NFL players Roy Williams and Rocky Calmus.

=== Bob Stoops era (1999–2016) ===
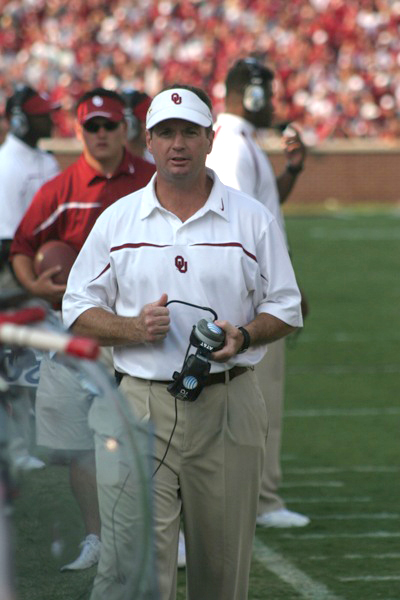
Coach Stoops

Under pressure to find a head coach who would turn the program around, athletic director Joe Castiglione vetted each candidate personally. He eventually selected Stoops, then the defensive coordinator at Florida, who improved the Sooners to 7–5 in his first season.

==== Perennial BCS contention ====
Oklahoma began the 2000 season ranked No. 19 in the AP poll, their first preseason AP poll appearance in five years. After a 4–0 start, the Sooners defeated No. 11 Texas 63–14; running back Quentin Griffin broke a school record with six rushing touchdowns in the game. The next week, the Sooners beat No. 2 Kansas State 41–31, then defeated top-ranked Nebraska 31–14 two weeks later, finishing out a stretch that would be remembered as "Red October". The Sooners finished the regular season undefeated and beat Kansas State in the conference championship game to win their first conference title since 1987. In the years since that victory, the Big Eight had dissolved and the Sooners had joined its successor conference, the Big 12. Additionally, the BCS format had been established, with each season culminating in a national championship game between the top two teams in the system's rankings. Oklahoma was ranked No. 1 following the conference championship win and played Florida State in the Orange Bowl for the BCS title. The Sooners defeated the heavily favored Seminoles 13–2 to claim the school's seventh national championship. The team produced consensus All-Americans for the first time since 1988, including quarterback Josh Heupel, who finished runner-up for the Heisman in one of the closest votes in the award's history to that point.

In the following years, Oklahoma contended for conference and national championships and qualified for major bowl games. In 2001, after rivalry losses to Nebraska and Oklahoma State, Oklahoma did not earn a spot in the conference championship game. However, the Sooners were granted a Cotton Bowl Classic berth, their first in school history, and subsequently defeated Arkansas. In 2002, the Sooners won the Big 12 and advanced to the Rose Bowl for the first time, defeating No. 7 Washington State.

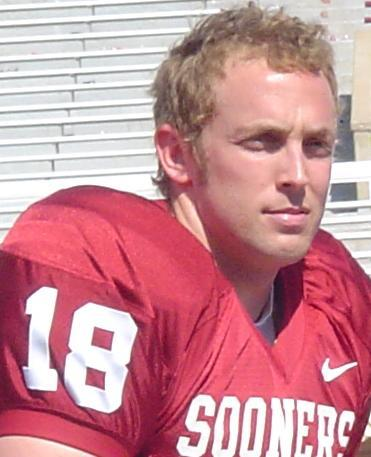
Jason White

Oklahoma went undefeated in the regular season in both 2003 and 2004. In 2003, the Sooners defeated Texas A&M 77–0 and Texas 65–13, the latter being the biggest win in Red River Rivalry history. Led by Heisman Trophy winner Jason White, OU was ranked No. 1 in every AP poll of the season until an upset in the Big 12 Championship Game by Kansas State dropped them to third. However, the Sooners remained No. 1 in the BCS rankings and were thus able to play for the national championship in the Sugar Bowl, which they subsequently lost to LSU. White, a Tuttle, Oklahoma native, threw for 3,846 yards and 40 touchdowns in his Heisman campaign but was kept in check by the LSU defense, completing just over 35 percent of his passes and throwing two interceptions. The next year, freshman running back Adrian Peterson emerged as a star with 1,925 yards and 15 touchdowns on the ground. He finished second in Heisman voting behind USC quarterback Matt Leinart. The AP, Coaches Poll, and BCS all ranked USC at No. 1 and Oklahoma at No. 2 in every poll of the season until the two met in the Orange Bowl for the national championship. Oklahoma went on to lose their second straight national championship game. Following the season, several key players departed as 10 Sooners were selected in the 2005 NFL draft.

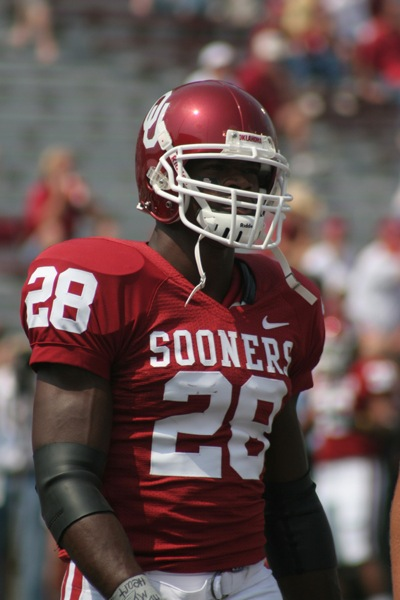
Adrian Peterson

==== Postseason letdowns ====
In 2005, the Sooners fell out of the AP poll for the first time since the 1999 season, but they still finished the year with an 8–4 record and a Holiday Bowl victory over No. 6 Oregon. In both 2006 and 2007, the Sooners won the Big 12, but suffered upset losses in their bowl games. In the 2007 Fiesta Bowl, the Sooners lost a back-and-forth game in overtime when Boise State executed a Statue of Liberty play on a two-point conversion attempt to win 43–42. Oklahoma qualified for the Fiesta Bowl again the following year and lost to West Virginia 48–28.

Prior to the 2007 season, the NCAA announced sanctions due to violations committed by players on the 2005 team who had been paid for unperformed work at a Norman car dealership. The NCAA found Oklahoma guilty of a "failure to monitor" the improper employment benefits and punished the team by vacating its victories from the 2005 season. However, in 2008, the NCAA partially reversed its decision and reinstated the vacated wins.

The 2008 team scored the most points in college football history to that point, averaging over 51 per game. At the end of the 2008 regular season, the Big 12 South finished in a three-way tie between Oklahoma, Texas, and Texas Tech, with each team having suffered one loss at the hands of another. As the team with the highest BCS ranking, Oklahoma advanced to the conference championship game on a tie-breaker. The Sooners won the game, and quarterback Sam Bradford won the Heisman Trophy. His 53 combined passing and rushing touchdowns are tied for the most ever in a Heisman campaign. The Sooners advanced to the BCS National Championship Game but lost to Florida.

==== Late Stoops era ====
After a Fiesta Bowl victory in 2010, the Sooners, led by Stoops and new co-offensive coordinator Josh Heupel, were ranked No. 1 in the polls to start the 2011 season. After maintaining their ranking for three weeks, the Sooners achieved their 100th No. 1 ranking in the AP poll, becoming the first team to accomplish the feat since the poll began in 1936.

2011 marked the final time that the Sooners were ranked No. 1 under Stoops. However, Oklahoma remained competitive throughout the rest of the BCS era, including a 2014 Sugar Bowl win over defending national champions Alabama. The following year saw the introduction of the College Football Playoff. Under this system, four teams are selected to compete in national semifinal games in which the winners advance to the national championship game. The Sooners received their first playoff berth in 2015 and subsequently lost to Clemson in their semifinal game, the Orange Bowl. Despite winning the Big 12 in 2016, Oklahoma lost two regular season games and did not make the playoff. They defeated Auburn in the Sugar Bowl, 35–19.

In June 2017, Stoops announced that he was stepping down as head coach, with offensive coordinator Lincoln Riley immediately appointed as his replacement. Stoops said that he felt that the time was right to retire, with a source indicating to Gene Wojciechowski of ESPN that Stoops wanted to leave on his own terms while he still could, without the university or his health forcing him to step aside. During his tenure in Norman, Stoops produced a 190–48 (.798) record, 10 conference titles, and a school-record 18 bowl game appearances. In 2021, he was inducted into the College Football Hall of Fame.

=== Lincoln Riley and Brent Venables (2017–present) ===
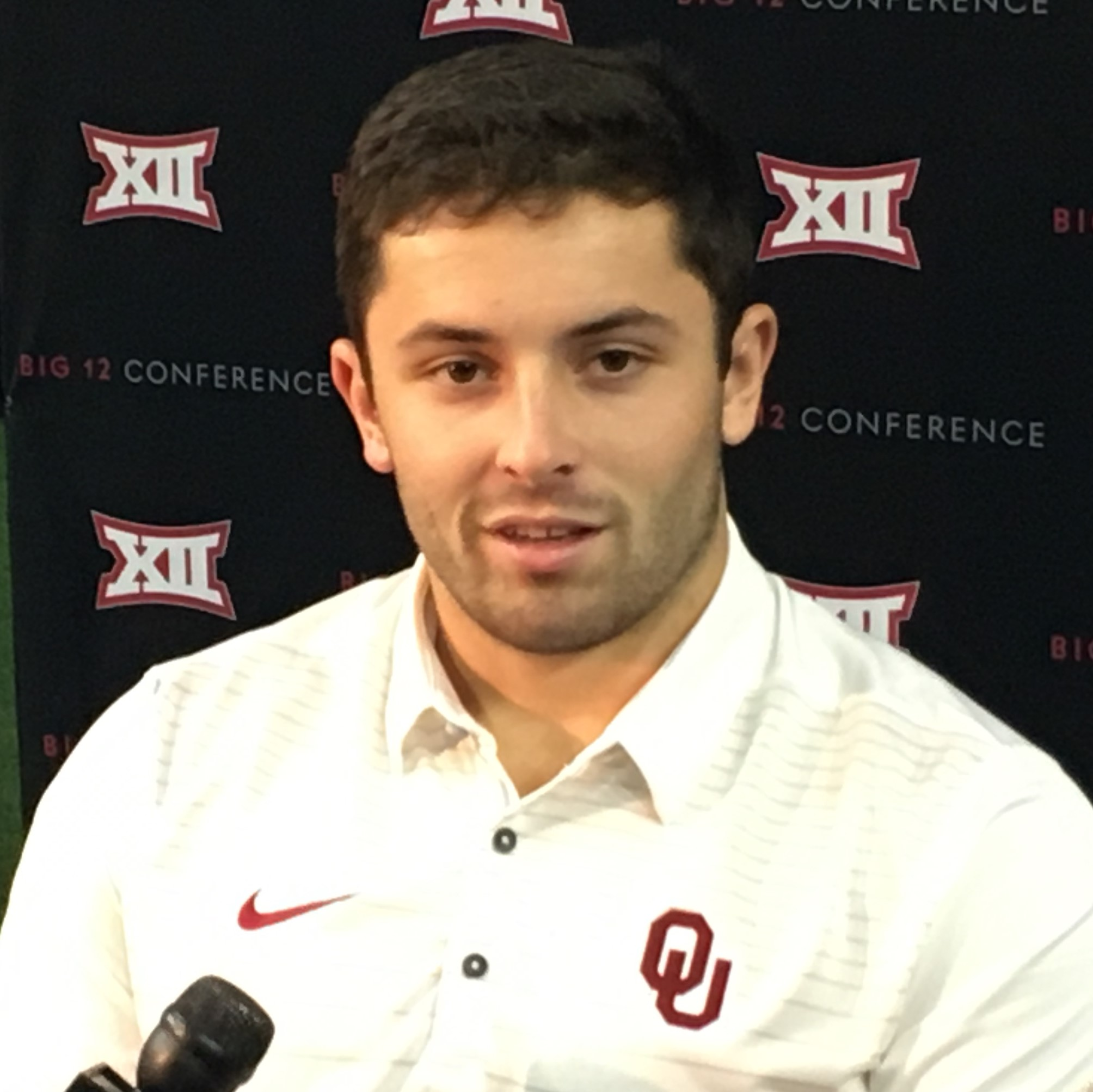
Baker Mayfield

In his first season, Riley led the Sooners to 12 wins, besting the 10-win record held by Chuck Fairbanks and Barry Switzer for most victories by a first-year coach in program history. The Sooners entered the playoff against Georgia in the Rose Bowl, where they surrendered a 17-point lead and lost 54–48 in double overtime. 2017 was the first of three consecutive 12–2 seasons for the Sooners under Riley, however, each ended in a College Football Playoff semifinal loss. Despite their lack of playoff success, the Sooners won four straight Big 12 Championship Games during Riley's tenure.

Under Riley, the Sooners had two consecutive Heisman Trophy winners who became No. 1 overall picks in the NFL draft. In 2017, Baker Mayfield broke his own FBS record for single-season passing efficiency while throwing for over 4,600 yards and 43 touchdowns. He was selected first overall in the 2018 NFL draft. The following season, Kyler Murray topped Mayfield's passing efficiency mark and became the seventh Heisman winner in program history. He was selected first overall in the 2019 NFL draft. To replace Murray for the 2019 season, Riley turned to ex-Alabama starter Jalen Hurts. The Sooners lost 63–28 to eventual national champion LSU in the Peach Bowl, and Hurts finished second in Heisman voting to LSU quarterback Joe Burrow. As of the end of the 2022 season, Mayfield, Murray, and Hurts collectively own four of the top 12 passing efficiency seasons in FBS history.

In July 2021, Oklahoma and Texas announced that they would leave the Big 12 for the Southeastern Conference (SEC) upon the expiration of the Big 12's media rights contracts in 2025. The surprising move initiated a widespread wave of conference realignment that saw, among many other moves, Pac-12 teams USC and UCLA announce their intention to join the Big Ten. Oklahoma and Texas have been criticized for abandoning their historic conference roots and setting the stage for other teams to do so, thereby creating a landscape in which the SEC and Big Ten are poised to dominate the sport at the expense of other conferences. In February 2023, the two defecting universities negotiated a combined $100 million early termination fee with the Big 12 in order to leave the conference a year early, prior to the end of the media rights deals. Oklahoma and Texas began SEC play in 2024.

Prior to the end of the 2021 season, Riley accepted the head coach position at USC, becoming the first head coach to leave Oklahoma for a different job since Chuck Fairbanks in 1973. Chuck Carlton, writing for The Dallas Morning News, said that the departure "blindsided most of the college football world." During his tenure in Norman, Riley compiled a 55–10 (.846) record and achieved the highest winning percentage of any coach in program history. Bob Stoops was named interim head coach for the team's Alamo Bowl appearance and led the Sooners to victory. Clemson defensive coordinator Brent Venables, who had once held the same position at Oklahoma under Stoops, was hired as Riley's replacement. In his first year at the helm, the Sooners finished 6–7, including 49–0 loss to Texas, Oklahoma's worst loss in Red River Rivalry history and the biggest shutout loss that the Sooners have ever suffered. The 2023 season saw Oklahoma finish 10–3, their season culminating in an Alamo Bowl loss to Arizona. That game marked the end of OU's tenure in the Big 12.

Oklahoma returned to the College Football Playoff in 2025, the second season after the playoff's expansion from four teams to twelve. Following a 10–2 regular season that included a road victory over No. 4 Alabama, the Sooners were seeded eighth and hosted a first round game against the ninth-seeded Crimson Tide. Oklahoma took a 17–0 lead in the rematch but lost 34–24, equaling their own record for the largest blown lead in the history of the playoff. As of the end of the 2025 season, Oklahoma has an 0–5 playoff record and is the only FBS team with multiple playoff appearances and no playoff wins.

== Conference affiliations ==
Oklahoma joined the Southeastern Conference in 2024.

Oklahoma has been independent and a member of four conferences.

- Independent (1895–1914)
- Southwest Conference (1915–1919)
- Big Eight Conference (1920–1995)
- Big 12 Conference (1996–2023)
- Southeastern Conference (2024–present)

== Championships ==
=== National championships ===
Oklahoma has 7 claimed national championships and has been selected by NCAA-designated major selector for a further 10 unclaimed national championships.

==== Claimed national championships ====
Season	Coach	Selector(s)	Record	Bowl	Opponent	Result	Final AP	Final Coaches'
1950	Bud Wilkinson	AP, Berryman, Helms, Litkenhous, UPI Coaches, Williamson	10–1	Sugar Bowl	Kentucky	L 7–13	No. 1	No. 1
1955	Bud Wilkinson	AP, Berryman, Billingsley, DeVold, Dunkel, Football Research, FW, Helms, INS, Litkenhous, National Championship Foundation, Poling, Sagarin, Sagarin (ELO-Chess), UPI coaches, Williamson	11–0	Orange Bowl	Maryland	W 20–6	No. 1	No. 1
1956	Bud Wilkinson	AP, Billingsley, Boand, DeVold, Dunkel, FW, Helms, INS, Litkenhous, National Championship Foundation, Sagarin, UPI coaches, Williamson	10–0				No. 1	No. 1
1974	Barry Switzer	AP, Berryman, Billingsley, DeVold, Dunkel, FACT, FB News, Football Research, Helms*, Litkenhous, National Championship Foundation*, Poling, Sagarin, Sagarin (ELO-Chess)	11–0				No. 1	–
1975	Barry Switzer	AP, Billingsley, DeVold, Dunkel, FACT*, FB News, Football Research, FW, Helms*, National Championship Foundation*, NFF, Sagarin, Sagarin (ELO-Chess), UPI Coaches	11–1	Orange Bowl	Michigan	W 14–6	No. 1	No. 1
1985	Barry Switzer	AP, Berryman, Billingsley, DeVold, Dunkel, FACT, FB News, Football Research, FW, National Championship Foundation, NFF, NY Times, Sagarin*, Sporting News, UPI, USA/CNN coaches	11–1	Orange Bowl	Penn State	W 25–10	No. 1	No. 1
2000	Bob Stoops	AP, Berryman, BCS, Billingsley, DeVold, Dunkel, Eck, FACT, FB News, FW, Massey, Matthews, National Championship Foundation, NFF, Sagarin, Sagarin (ELO-Chess), Seattle Times, Sporting News, USA/ESPN	13–0	Orange Bowl (BCS National Championship Game)	Florida State	W 13–2	No. 1	No. 1

==== Unclaimed national championships ====
The following list is for years other than the seven in which Oklahoma was selected by a major NCAA recognized selector as national champion. Oklahoma does not claim these seasons as national championships.

Season	Coach	Selector(s)	Record	Bowl	Opponent	Result	Final AP	Final Coaches'
1915	Bennie Owen	Billingsley MOV	10–0				—	—
1949	Bud Wilkinson	Football Research	11–0	Sugar Bowl	LSU	W 35–0	No. 2	—
1953	Bud Wilkinson	Berryman, Football Research	9–1–1	Orange Bowl	Maryland	W 7–0	No. 4	No. 5
1957	Bud Wilkinson	Berryman	10–1	Orange Bowl	Duke	W 48–21	No. 4	No. 4
1967	Chuck Fairbanks	Poling	10–1	Orange Bowl	Tennessee	W 26–24	No. 3	No. 3
1973	Barry Switzer	DeVold, Dunkel, Football Research, Sagarin	10–0–1				No. 3	No. 2
1978	Barry Switzer	DeVold, Dunkel, FACT, Helms, Litkenhous, Matthews, Poling, Rothman, Sagarin	11–1	Orange Bowl	Nebraska	W 31–24	No. 3	No. 3
1980	Barry Switzer	Dunkel, Matthews	10–2	Orange Bowl	Florida State	W 18–17	No. 3	No. 3
1986	Barry Switzer	Berryman, DeVold, Dunkel, Football Research, NY Times, Sagarin	11–1	Orange Bowl	Arkansas	W 42–8	No. 3	No. 3
2003	Bob Stoops	Berryman	12–2	BCS Nat'l Championship Game	LSU	L 14–21	No. 3	No. 3

* retrospective selection

=== Conference championships ===
The team has captured 50 conference titles, the most of any current FBS member, including 14 in a row from 1946 to 1959.

#	Season	Conference	Coach	Overall Record	Conference Record
1	1915	Southwest	Bennie Owen	10–0	3–0
2	1918 †	Southwest	Bennie Owen	6–0	2–0
3	1920	MVIAA	Bennie Owen	6–0–1	4–0–1
4	1938	Big 6	Tom Stidham	10–1	5–0
5	1943	Big 6	Dewey Luster	7–2	5–0
6	1944	Big 6	Dewey Luster	6–3–1	4–0–1
7	1946 †	Big 6	Jim Tatum	8–3	4–1
8	1947 †	Big 6	Bud Wilkinson	7–2–1	4–0–1
9	1948	Big 7	Bud Wilkinson	10–1	5–0
10	1949	Big 7	Bud Wilkinson	11–0	5–0
11	1950	Big 7	Bud Wilkinson	10–1	6–0
12	1951	Big 7	Bud Wilkinson	8–2	6–0
13	1952	Big 7	Bud Wilkinson	8–1–1	5–0
14	1953	Big 7	Bud Wilkinson	9–1–1	6–0
15	1954	Big 7	Bud Wilkinson	10–0	6–0
16	1955	Big 7	Bud Wilkinson	11–0	6–0
17	1956	Big 7	Bud Wilkinson	10–0	6–0
18	1957	Big 7	Bud Wilkinson	10–1	6–0
19	1958	Big 8	Bud Wilkinson	10–1	6–0
20	1959	Big 8	Bud Wilkinson	7–3	5–1
21	1962	Big 8	Bud Wilkinson	8–3	7–0
22	1967	Big 8	Chuck Fairbanks	10–1	7–0
23	1968 †	Big 8	Chuck Fairbanks	7–4	6–1
24	1972 ‡	Big 8	Chuck Fairbanks	11–1	6–1
25	1973	Big 8	Barry Switzer	10–0–1	7–0
26	1974	Big 8	Barry Switzer	11–0	7–0
27	1975 †	Big 8	Barry Switzer	11–1	6–1
28	1976 †	Big 8	Barry Switzer	9–2–1	6–1
29	1977	Big 8	Barry Switzer	10–2	7–0
30	1978 †	Big 8	Barry Switzer	11–1	6–0
31	1979	Big 8	Barry Switzer	11–1	7–0
32	1980	Big 8	Barry Switzer	10–2	7–0
33	1984 †	Big 8	Barry Switzer	9–2–1	6–1
34	1985	Big 8	Barry Switzer	11–1	7–0
35	1986	Big 8	Barry Switzer	11–1	7–0
36	1987	Big 8	Barry Switzer	11–1	7–0
37	2000	Big 12	Bob Stoops	13–0	8–0
38	2002	Big 12	Bob Stoops	12–2	6–2
39	2004	Big 12	Bob Stoops	12–1	8–0
40	2006	Big 12	Bob Stoops	11–3	7–1
41	2007	Big 12	Bob Stoops	11–3	6–2
42	2008	Big 12	Bob Stoops	12–2	7–1
43	2010	Big 12	Bob Stoops	12–2	6–2
44	2012 †	Big 12	Bob Stoops	10–3	8–1
45	2015	Big 12	Bob Stoops	11–2	8–1
46	2016	Big 12	Bob Stoops	11–2	9–0
47	2017	Big 12	Lincoln Riley	12–2	8–1
48	2018	Big 12	Lincoln Riley	12–2	8–1
49	2019	Big 12	Lincoln Riley	12–2	8–1
50	2020	Big 12	Lincoln Riley	9–2	6–2

† Co-championship

‡ Both Nebraska and Oklahoma claim the 1972 championship, despite Oklahoma in early 1973 forfeiting eight games from the 1972 season and the Big 8 crown.

=== Division championships ===
The Sooners have been a member of only one division, the Big 12 South, in their entire history. They were members from 1996 until 2010, after which the Big 12 ceased divisional play.

Season	Division	Coach	Overall Record	Conference Record	Opponent	CG result
2000	Big 12 South	Bob Stoops	13–0	8–0	Kansas State	W 27–24
2002 †	Big 12 South	Bob Stoops	12–2	6–2	Colorado	W 29–7
2003	Big 12 South	Bob Stoops	12–2	8–0	Kansas State	L 7–35
2004	Big 12 South	Bob Stoops	12–1	8–0	Colorado	W 42–3
2006	Big 12 South	Bob Stoops	11–3	7–1	Nebraska	W 21–7
2007	Big 12 South	Bob Stoops	11–3	6–2	Missouri	W 38–17
2008 †	Big 12 South	Bob Stoops	12–2	7–1	Missouri	W 62–21
2010 †	Big 12 South	Bob Stoops	12–2	6–2	Nebraska	W 23–20

† Co-championship

== Bowl games ==
Since the establishment of the team in 1895, Oklahoma has appeared in 58 bowl games and has a record of 31 victories, 26 losses, and one tie. (Note: Oklahoma has also appeared in one College Football Playoff First Round game, losing 34–24 to Alabama in 2025.) The team's first bowl game appearance was in the 1939 Orange Bowl, which was a 17–0 loss against Tennessee. Its most recent bowl game appearance was in the 2024 Armed Forces Bowl, which was a 21–20 loss against Navy. Oklahoma is one of only two schools to have appeared in all five of the BCS era bowl games (2001 Orange, 2003 Rose, 2004 Sugar, 2007 Fiesta, 2009 BCS NCG), with the other being Ohio State. Oklahoma's bowl game participation and victories rank among the top of FBS bowl records.

== Head coaches ==
The Sooners have had 23 head coaches in their history. The current head coach, Brent Venables, was hired on December 5, 2021. Since the first head coach, John A. Harts, guided the team for one game in 1895, the Sooners have played in more than 1,300 games. Four men have coached the team in more than 100 games; all of them have more than 100 wins at Oklahoma. (Note: Bennie Owen (192 games, 122 wins); Bud Wilkinson (178 games, 145 wins); Barry Switzer (190 games, 157 wins); Bob Stoops (239 games, 191 wins)) Oklahoma is the only program with four 100-win coaches in its history. The coach with the highest winning percentage in school history is Lincoln Riley, who went 55–10 (.846) across five seasons. The lowest winning percentage aside from Harts, who lost his only game, belongs to John Blake, who went 12–22 (.353) across three seasons. Ten coaches have led the Sooners to postseason bowl games: Tom Stidham, Jim Tatum, Bud Wilkinson, Gomer Jones, Chuck Fairbanks, Barry Switzer, Gary Gibbs, Bob Stoops, Riley, and Venables. Nine coaches have won conference championships with the Sooners: Bennie Owen, Stidham, Dewey Luster, Tatum, Wilkinson, Fairbanks, Switzer, Stoops, and Riley. Wilkinson, Switzer, and Stoops have each received National Coach of the Year honors from at least one organization. Six Sooner coaches (Owen, Lawrence Jones, Tatum, Wilkinson, Switzer, and Stoops) have been inducted into the College Football Hall of Fame.

=== Coaching staff ===
Name	Position	Consecutive season at Oklahoma in current position	Previous position
Ben Arbuckle	Offensive Coordinator/Quarterbacks	2nd	Washington State – Offensive Coordinator/Quarterbacks (2023–2025)
Todd Bates	Associate head coach / co–defensive coordinator / run defense / defensive tackles	5th	Clemson – Defensive tackles / recruiting coordinator (2020–2021)
Bill Bedenbaugh	Offensive line	13th	Oklahoma – Co–offensive coordinator / offensive line (2017–2021)
Miguel Chavis	Defensive ends	5th	Clemson – Defensive player development (2017–2021)
Doug Deakin	Special teams coordinator	2nd	San Diego State
Nate Dreiling	Inside Linebackers Coach	2nd	Utah State – Interim HC/DC (2024)
Wes Goodwin	Assistant Linebackers/Outside Linebackers	2nd	Clemson – Defensive Coordinator/Linebackers (2021–2024)
Brandon Hall	Safeties	5th	Troy – Interim head coach / defensive coordinator / safeties (2021)
Emmett Jones	Wide receivers Coach and Passing Game Coordinator	4th	Texas Tech – Wide Receivers Coach and Passing Game Coordinator (2022)
John Kuceyeski	Quarterbacks Coach	1st	Oklahoma – senior offensive analyst (2025)
Deland McCullough	Running backs	1st	Las Vegas Raiders – Running backs (2025)
LeMar Morgan	Cornerbacks	1st	Michigan Wolverines football – Defensive passing game coordinator (2024–2025)
Kevin Wilson	Assistant head coach for offense	1st	Oklahoma – Offensive analyst
Jason Witten	Tight end	1st	Liberty Christian (TX) – HC (2021-2025)
James Dobson	Director of sport enhancement / strength & conditioning	1st	

== Stadium ==
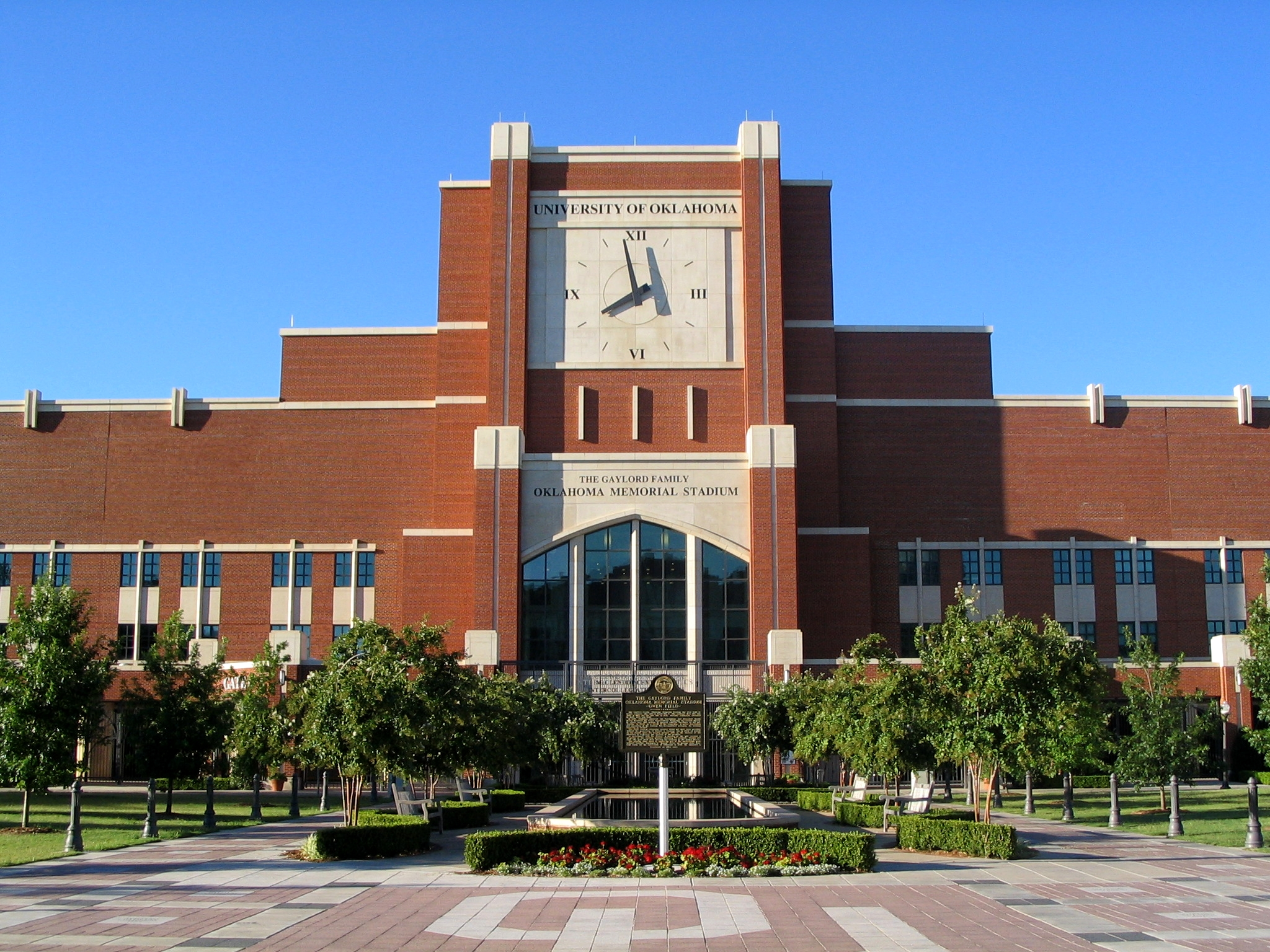
Gaylord Family – Oklahoma Memorial Stadium

The Sooners play their home games at Gaylord Family Oklahoma Memorial Stadium, also known as The Palace on the Prairie. The stadium was formerly called Oklahoma Memorial Stadium in honor of those killed in World War I. In 2002, the Gaylord Family name was added in recognition of financial contributions—estimated at about $50 million—made by Edward K. Gaylord and his family to the university. The playing surface is named Owen Field after Bennie Owen, Oklahoma's coach from 1905 to 1926. The stadium opened in 1923 with a capacity of 500. Its capacity grew to 16,000 in 1925 and 32,000 in 1929, with renovations in subsequent decades adding upper decks and an exterior brick facade. The stadium's official capacity is currently 80,126. It has had a natural grass playing surface for the most of its existence, the only exception being the period from 1970 to 1994, when artificial turf was used. The Sooners' average attendance is typically above capacity, peaking at 86,857 during the 2016 season. The largest crowd ever was 88,308 on November 11, 2017, when fifth-ranked Oklahoma defeated sixth-ranked TCU.

== Rivalries ==
=== Missouri ===
Oklahoma leads the series against the Missouri Tigers 68–25–5, with the most recent game having been played in 2025. The two former members of the Big Eight and Big 12 once competed for the Tiger–Sooner Peace Pipe, a trophy that was donated in 1940 and lost sometime during the 1970s. Oklahoma won 14 consecutive meetings from 1946 to 1959, and between 1967 and 2008, Missouri won just four of 37 meetings. The teams met in the Big 12 Championship Game twice, with Oklahoma defeating top-ranked Missouri in 2007 before winning in dominant fashion in 2008. The series was paused after Missouri left the Big 12 for the Southeastern Conference in 2012, but it resumed upon Oklahoma's joining that conference in 2024.

=== Nebraska ===
As members of the Big Eight Conference, Oklahoma's rivalry with the Nebraska Cornhuskers frequently had conference championship or even national championship implications. The two teams, which often met on Thanksgiving, won a combined 77 conference titles between 1907 and 1995. The teams are noted for playing in a 1971 Game of the Century matchup, which Nebraska won 35–31. In 1996, upon joining the Big 12 Conference, Nebraska was placed in the North Division and Oklahoma joined the South Division, thus ending the annual games between the programs. However, the series would continue to produce marquee matchups, including a 2000 game in which Nebraska and Oklahoma were ranked number one and two in the BCS rankings, respectively. The teams played for the Big 12 championship twice, with Oklahoma winning in both 2006 and 2010. Following Nebraska's move to the Big Ten Conference, the rivalry game has become a non-conference matchup and is thus played on an infrequent basis. Oklahoma leads the series 47–38–3, having won the last three matchups. The next game in the series is scheduled for 2029.

=== Oklahoma State ===
Oklahoma has historically dominated their series against the Oklahoma State Cowboys, leading the series 91–20–7 through the end of the 2023 season. The first game was played in 1904, and Oklahoma State first scored a point against the Sooners in 1914, the ninth matchup in the series. Oklahoma won 19 straight Bedlam games from 1946 to 1964 and went 26–1–1 from 1967 to 1994. Oklahoma State, however, has won two of the last three matchups. As a result of Oklahoma's move to the Southeastern Conference, the series is not expected to continue in the foreseeable future. In comments to the media prior to the 2023 season, Oklahoma's last as a member of the Big 12, Oklahoma State head coach Mike Gundy declared the rivalry "history" and stated that there is no room for the game in Oklahoma State's non-conference schedule until after 2037.

=== Texas ===
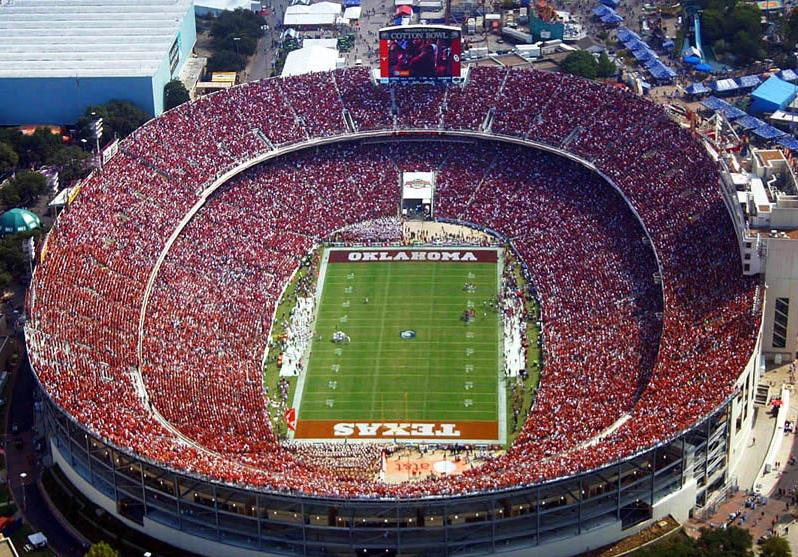
The Cotton Bowl is the site of the Red River Rivalry game

The Red River Rivalry game is played annually in Dallas during the State Fair of Texas between Oklahoma and the Texas Longhorns. Since 1929, the game has been played at the Cotton Bowl, located approximately halfway between Norman and Austin. (Note: In 2018, in addition to their annual regular season matchup, Oklahoma and Texas played in the Big 12 Championship Game, which was held at AT&T Stadium in Arlington.) Seating for the game is split along the stadium's 50-yard line, with Oklahoma fans occupying the south half of the field and Texas fans occupying the north. For the majority of the 20th century, the game was a non-conference matchup, pitting Oklahoma of the Big Eight Conference against Texas of the Southwest Conference. In 1996, the two programs became part of the Big 12 Conference's South division. That year, Oklahoma won the first overtime game of the series after a tie the previous year. In 2024, both teams moved to the Southeastern Conference, where the rivalry has continued. Texas leads the series 65–52–5 through the end of the 2026 regular season.

== Pageantry ==
=== School colors ===
Crimson	Cream

Oklahoma's official school colors are crimson and cream. These colors were picked in 1895 by May Overstreet, the only female faculty member at the time. The colors were her own personal choice and she decided on them after viewing many color samples and materials. After her decision, the colors were brought in front of the student body who enthusiastically approved of her selections.

=== Mascot ===
Oklahoma has had several mascots. The first was a stray dog named Mex. Mex was found in Mexico during the Mexican Revolution by Mott Keys, an army hospital medic. Keys' company adopted the dog and Keys took the dog back to Hollis, Oklahoma when he completed his duty. When Keys was enrolled in the university, he took Mex with him to Norman. With his experience as an army medic, Keys landed a job with the football team and a residence at the Kappa Sigma fraternity house. Mex's main duty during games was to keep stray dogs from roaming the field. He wore a red sweater with a big "O" letter on the side. Mex received national attention in October 1924 when the Oklahoma football team lost a game against Drake University. Mex was lost when the team boarded a train in Arkansas City, Kansas. The media blamed the loss on the field on the loss of their mascot. Mex was found later by two Oklahoma graduates. Mex died of old age on April 30, 1928. The campus was closed and classes were canceled on the day of his funeral. He was buried in a casket somewhere under the stadium.

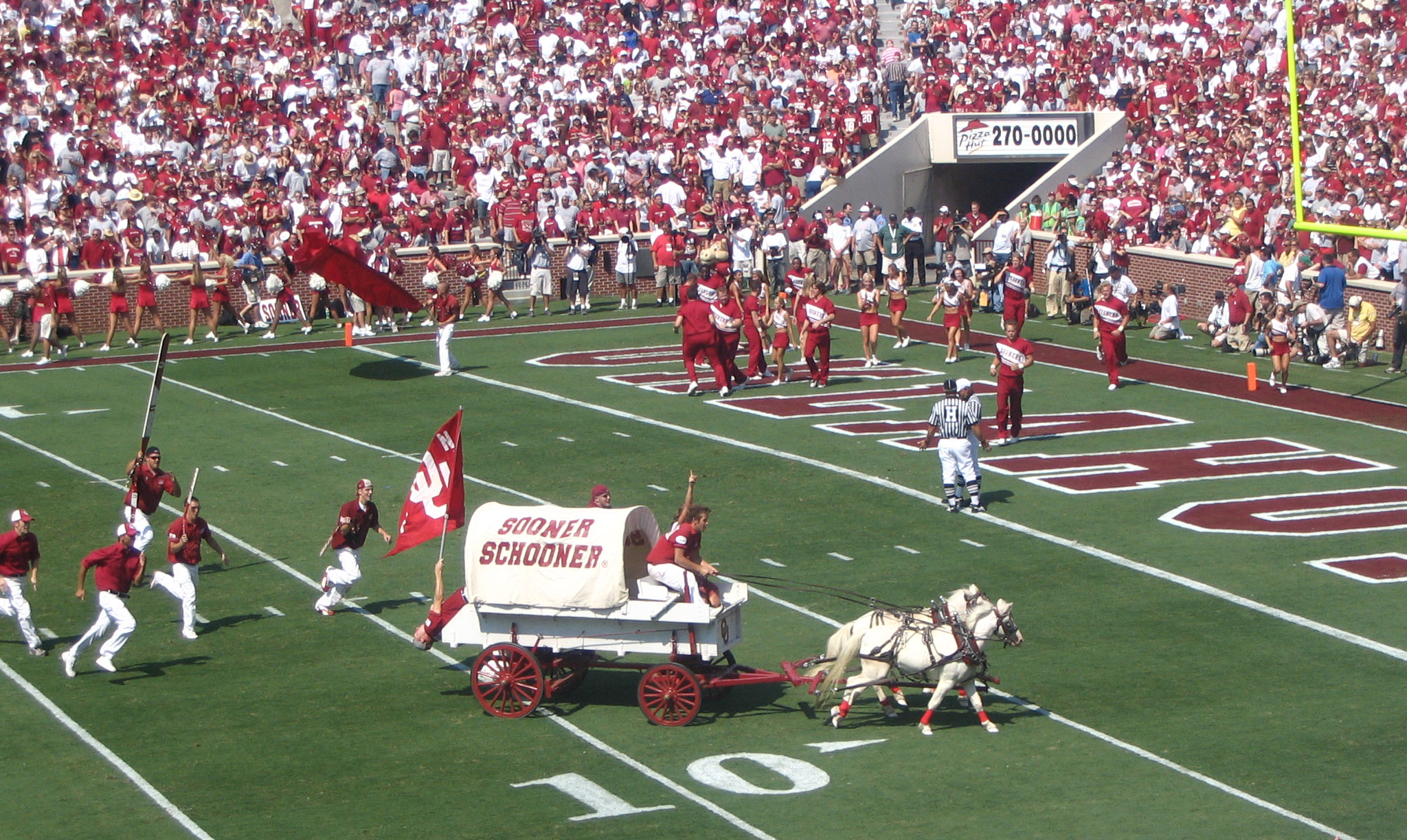
The Sooner Schooner on the field during a football game.

Never an official mascot, Little Red began appearing at games in 1953. He was an Indian who wore red tights, breech cloth and a war bonnet and was last portrayed by Randy Palmer. In April 1970, Little Red was banished by Oklahoma president John Herbert Hollomon, Jr. The student court issued a temporary restraining order to keep Little Red from appearing at Sooner games. Despite this order, Palmer showed up as Little Red for the 1970 season opener where he was met with cheers from the crowd. When Palmer was drafted after the 1971 season, no one showed up for try-outs to replace him.

The mascot for Oklahoma is the Sooner Schooner, a conestoga wagon similar to the primary method of transportation used by early settlers in Oklahoma. The Schooner is maintained and driven by members of the RUF/NEKS, the university's all-male spirit organization, along with two white ponies named Boomer and Sooner. In 2005, the university also introduced two costumed mascots also named Boomer and Sooner to serve as mascots for football games and events that do not permit a covered wagon.

=== Music ===
The official fight song of the Sooners is "Boomer Sooner." This song is played frequently at football games and is played by the band after touchdowns, field goals, after significant plays, and when the team or crowd need a boost of energy. "OK Oklahoma" is another school song that is played after an extra point and when the Sooner Schooner rolls onto the field. The official Alma Mater song is the "OU Chant", which is sung by OU fans before sporting events and at ceremonial occasions. Other tunes frequently heard at OU football games include the state song "Oklahoma" and "Fight for OKU."

The Pride of Oklahoma Marching Band is a nationally renowned ensemble founded in 1904. The largest student organization on campus, the band performs at all home games and frequently travels to other games. The band holds a game ball from the Bedlam Series game in 1983, known as "the day the Pride won." On that day, the Sooners were behind 20–3 when band director Gene Thrailkill was removed from the field for not having a sideline pass. Thrailkill told the Pride to "start playing and don't stop until we're ahead!" The band complied, and OU came back to win 21–20.

== Awards ==
=== Heisman Trophy ===
The Heisman Trophy is awarded annually to the nation's most outstanding college football player. Seven Oklahoma players have won the Heisman Trophy: Billy Vessels, Steve Owens, Billy Sims, Jason White, Sam Bradford, Baker Mayfield, and Kyler Murray. Oklahoma's total is tied with Notre Dame and Ohio State for the second most Heisman wins by a university, behind only USC with eight. In addition, Oklahoma is tied with Stanford with the most runner-up finishes with six: Kurt Burris, Greg Pruitt, Billy Sims, Josh Heupel, Adrian Peterson and Jalen Hurts.

Year	Player	Position	Points	Notes
1952	Billy Vessels	Halfback	525	
1969	Steve Owens	Running back	1,488	
1978	Billy Sims	Running back	827	
2003	Jason White	Quarterback	1,481	
2008	Sam Bradford	Quarterback	1,726	
2017	Baker Mayfield	Quarterback	2,398	
2018	Kyler Murray	Quarterback	2,167	

=== Other awards ===
Outland Trophy Best college football interior lineman
1951	Jim Weatherall – T
1953	J.D. Roberts – G
1975	Lee Roy Selmon – DT
1978	Greg Roberts – G
2004	Jammal Brown – OT
Sporting News College Football Player of the Year Player of the year
1952	Billy Vessels – HB
1956	Tommy McDonald – HB
1969	Steve Owens – HB
1978	Billy Sims – HB
2003	Jason White – QB
2008	Sam Bradford – QB
2015	Baker Mayfield – QB
Maxwell Award Best all-around college football player
1956	Tommy McDonald – HB
2004	Jason White – QB
2017	Baker Mayfield – QB

Walter Camp Award Collegiate football player of the year
1969	Steve Owens – HB
1978	Billy Sims – HB
2000	Josh Heupel – QB
2017	Baker Mayfield – QB
Lombardi Award Best lineman or linebacker
1975	Lee Roy Selmon – DT
1985	Tony Casillas – NG
2003	Tommie Harris – DT
Dick Butkus Award Top linebacker
1985	Brian Bosworth
1986	Brian Bosworth
2001	Rocky Calmus
2003	Teddy Lehman

Jim Thorpe Award Top defensive back
1987	Rickey Dixon (Note: Tied with Bennie Blades of Miami) – DB
2000	Roy Williams – S
2003	Derrick Strait – CB
Associated Press College Football Player of the Year Award Most outstanding collegiate football player
2000	Josh Heupel – QB
2003	Jason White – QB
2008	Sam Bradford – QB
2017	Baker Mayfield – QB
2018	Kyler Murray – QB
Bronko Nagurski Trophy Best defensive player
2001	Roy Williams – S
2003	Derrick Strait – CB
Chuck Bednarik Award Best defensive player
2003	Teddy Lehman – LB

Davey O'Brien Award Best quarterback
2003	Jason White
2004	Jason White
2008	Sam Bradford
2017	Baker Mayfield
2018	Kyler Murray
Johnny Unitas Golden Arm Award Outstanding senior quarterback
2004	Jason White
Burlsworth Trophy Most outstanding player who began his career as a walk-on
2015	Baker Mayfield – QB
2016	Baker Mayfield – QB
Fred Biletnikoff Award Outstanding receiver
2016	Dede Westbrook
John Mackey Award Most outstanding tight end
2017	Mark Andrews
Lou Groza Award Best kicker
2025	Tate Sandell

=== All-Americans ===
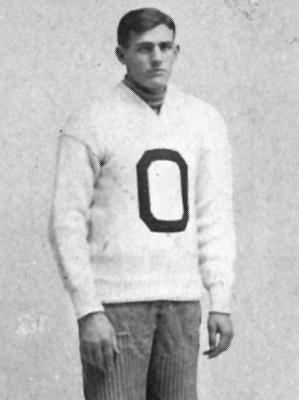
Claude Reeds – Oklahoma's first All American.

Every year, several publications release rosters of the best college football players in the country. The athletes on these lists are referred to as All-Americans. The NCAA recognizes five All-American lists. They are the Associated Press, American Football Coaches Association, Football Writers Association of America, The Sporting News, and the Walter Camp Football Foundation. A consensus All-American is typically defined as a player who is named to three or more lists, while a unanimous All-American must be named to all five. Oklahoma has had 169 first-team All-Americans in its history, with 83 of them being named consensus All-Americans and 35 being unanimous selections.

=== College Football Hall of Fame ===
Oklahoma has 31 inductees in the College Football Hall of Fame (25 players and six coaches). The first inductee was coach Bennie Owen, who was inducted as part of the inaugural class in 1951. The most recent is George Cumby, who was inducted in 2026.

Name	Position	Tenure	Inducted
Brian Bosworth	LB	1984–1986	2015
Tom Brahaney	C	1970–1972	2007
Kurt Burris	C	1951–1954	2000
Tony Casillas	DL	1982–1985	2004
George Cumby	LB	1975–1979	2026
Rickey Dixon	CB	1984–1987	2019
Forest Geyer	FB	1913–1915	1973
Keith Jackson	TE	1984–1987	2001
Biff Jones	Coach	1934–1936	1954
Tommy McDonald	WR	1954–1956	1985
Bennie Owen	Coach	1905–1926	1951
Jim Owens	TE	1946–1949	1982
Steve Owens	RB	1967–1969	1991
Greg Pruitt	RB	1970–1972	1999
Claude Reeds	FB	1910–1912	1961
J. D. Roberts	OG	1951–1953	1993
Rod Shoate	LB	1972–1974	2013
Barry Switzer	Coach	1973–1988	2001
Dewey Selmon	DL	1972–1975	2024
Lee Roy Selmon	DE	1972–1975	1988
Billy Sims	RB	1975–1978	1995
Bob Stoops	Coach	1999–2016	2021
Jim Tatum	Coach	1946	1984
Clendon Thomas	RB/DB	1955–1957	2011
Jerry Tubbs	C/LB	1954–1956	1996
Billy Vessels	RB	1950–1952	1974
Jim Weatherall	OT	1949–1951	1992
Joe Washington	RB	1972–1975	2005
Bud Wilkinson	Coach	1947–1963	1969
Roy Williams	DB	1999–2001	2022
Waddy Young	End	1936–1938	1986

== Future opponents ==
=== 2027 Southeastern Conference schedule ===
Opponent	Site	Result
Alabama	Gaylord Family Oklahoma Memorial Stadium; Norman, OK	
Arkansas	Gaylord Family Oklahoma Memorial Stadium; Norman, OK	
at Auburn	Jordan–Hare Stadium; Auburn, AL	
at LSU	Tiger Stadium; Baton Rouge, LA	
Missouri	Gaylord Family Oklahoma Memorial Stadium; Norman, OK (rivalry)	
at Ole Miss	Vaught–Hemingway Stadium; Oxford, MS	
Tennessee	Gaylord Family Oklahoma Memorial Stadium; Norman, OK	
vs. Texas	Cotton Bowl; Dallas, TX (Red River Rivalry)	
at Vanderbilt	FirstBank Stadium; Nashville, TN	

=== Non-conference ===
Announced non-conference schedules as of July 31, 2026.

2027	2028	2029	2030	2031	2032	2033	2034	2035	2036
Utah State	Temple	at San Diego State	Tulsa	San Diego State		Tulsa		at Clemson	Clemson
at SMU	at Houston	Nebraska	at Nebraska						
San Diego State	Missouri State								

== See also ==
- The Pride of Oklahoma Marching Band
- RUF/NEKS
- OU Chant
- List of Oklahoma Sooners in the NFL draft
- Play Like a Champion Today
