= New Music Economy =

New Music Economy is a term describing the emergent social, technical, political and economic context of the creative industries. This shift in context has been fueled by concurrent evolution within an ecosystem of interdependent technologies, institutions, and individuals; the result of which impacts the nature of creative property, identity, production, distribution and imagination.

The term New Music Economy is evolving out of new consumer behavior, methods of promotion and sales.

== Term usage history ==
Notable changes in the economic stability of the music industry started in the late 1990s with the advent of P2P file sharing. The Long Tail theory is a benchmark in the music industry for new economic concepts. The nuance of infinite shelf space opened up economic opportunity for independent record labels around the world. The term New Music Economy first emerged in 2007.

- Tim Westergren (Founder & CSO, Pandora) & Gideon D'Arcangelo (New York University) lead an event March 13, 2007 in Palo Alto, CA titled "Social Interactions in the New Music Economy"
- Venture Capitalist Fred Wilson began using the term "New Music Economy" in his blog on April 4, 2008.
- The San Fran Music Tech Summit used the term "New Music Economy" as a title of a Marketing Panel on May 8, 2008. The Panel & Audience of thought leaders attempted to create a formal definition for New Music Economy. The group wrote a list with 12 necessary components in defining the term New Music Economy:
  - Music Licensing
  - Co-Marketing
  - Branding with New Tools
  - Non Traditional Retail Space
  - Digital Distribution
  - Internet-Specific Content
  - Fan Artist Relationship Management
  - Quality Control
  - Content Management System Structures
  - Legal Structures
  - Live Performance
  - Incorporation of Attention Economy Principles in Marketing Strategies

Music Licensing
Bands, artists & labels are able to utilize music licensing for opportunity. Businesses are legally required to pay for the music they use to promote their product. Music has a positive effect on consumer behavior.

Co-Marketing
Brands and bands joining to market their product in sync.

Branding
Bands, artists & record labels using digital tools such as widgets, social networks, avatars, and icons.

Non Traditional Retail Space
Selling music in businesses that don't normally sell music.

Digital Distribution
(For sale and marketing purposes), including music, merchandise, video, concert tickets.

Internet Specific Content
Creating and using content online to drive fans toward exclusive content of economic value to the band/ artist/ label.

Fan Artist Relationship Management
Creation, moderation and maintenance of fan groups, fan sites and fan activities which includes exchanges of data ranging from email addresses to shared taste in music. Increased interaction between fans and artists/ bands/ labels with the use of blogs, fan clubs, forums, SMS, geo tagging.

Quality Control
Boutique licensing agencies, promotional companies, licensees, record labels and broadcasters focusing on curation & quality.

Content Management Systems
Content Management Systems (CMS) for bands, labels & artists, building development platforms for artist content and aggregating data for artist usability.

Legal Structures
Exploration, interpretation and invocation of music law to accommodate real changes in technology (example: Digital Millennium Copyright Act (DMCA)).

Live Performance
Bands & artists utilize new tools to book shows, accrue audiences who will attend shows, communicate tour dates to fans, sell tickets to fans, broadcast performances to fans who are unable to attend, provide attendees with immediate recordings of live performances, perform in creative venues ranging from vineyards (Wente Vineyards) to virtual worlds such as Second Life.

Incorporation of Attention Economy Principles in Marketing Strategies
Monitoring attention of consumers online with new metrics and measurements of consumption, rating systems and time spent.

== See also ==
- Music industry
- Copyright
- Concert tour
- Recording artist royalties
