= Cynthia Folio =

American composer and music educator

- Born: December 24, 1954 (age 71)
- Origin: United States
- Occupations: Composer; music theorist
- Instrument: Flute

Cynthia Folio (born December 24, 1954) is an American composer, flutist, and music theorist. She is a professor of Music Studies at Temple University, where she was honored with the Creative Achievement Award in 2012 and the Lindback Award for Distinguished Teaching in 1994. Folio's compositions have been described as “confident and musical in expressing ideas of great substance.” In addition, her work has been regarded as“ intriguing and enjoyable,” and “imaginatively scored.”

== Life and career ==
Folio was born and raised in Belvoir, Virginia. She earned her Ph.D. in music theory and a Performers Certificate in flute from the Eastman School of Music.

As a flutist, she has performed extensively as a soloist in the Philadelphia area with Latin Fiesta, David's Harp, the Silver and Wood Trio, the Philadelphia Classical Symphony, and Glaux, a contemporary music ensemble based at Temple University.

As a theorist, she has published many music theory articles, reviews, and book chapters on topics that focus primarily on the analysis of jazz, contemporary music, and the relationship between analysis and performance.

== Awards ==
Folio has received commissions from organizations such as Astral Artistic Services, the Mendelssohn Club of Philadelphia, Pi Kappa Lambda, the ZAWA! flute duo, the Women's Sacred Music Project, the Tiger Lily Trio, Network for New Music, the Relâche Ensemble, the Kirkwood Flute Ensemble, Music Teachers National Association, and the National Flute Association. She has earned numerous ASCAP Awards for composition and received the American Prize Honorable Mention for her piece about her daughter's seizures, called When the Spirit Catches You.. Her works are recorded on many CD's, including three that are devoted entirely to her works.

== Selected compositions ==
Some of Folio's compositions include:

- Living Legacy (1998)
- At the Edge of Great Quiet (1998)
- Through Window's Lattices (1998)
- Four 'Scapes (1999)
- Flute Loops (2000)
- Seven Aphorisms (2001)
- Two Songs on Poems by Stephen Dunn (2003)
- When the Spirit Catches You… (2004)
- Music Box (2005)
- A Matter of Honor: A Portrait of Alexander Hamilton (2005)
- Hamilton (2007)
- Voyage: I, Too, Can Sing a Dream (2009)
- Sonata for Flute and Piano (2011)
- We The Poets (2012)
