= Dennis Hayslett =

American conductor

Dennis Hayslett is an American music educator, conductor, and performer, with a particular focus upon the Concert Band and Jazz idioms.

== Career ==
Dennis Hayslett was formerly Director of Bands at Eastern Illinois University where he taught conducting, instrumental music education, and guided the Graduate Degree Program in Wind Conducting. Dr. Hayslett held similar positions on the faculties of The University of Toledo, Kent State University, and Western New Mexico University, and has directed both concert and marching bands at the college level, as well as teaching numerous graduate and undergraduate music courses. While a faculty member at The University of Toledo, he also conducted the Livonia Youth Philharmonic Orchestra.

== Performances ==
Much of Dr. Hayslett’s experience has been as a teacher and director of bands and orchestras in the public schools. Ensembles under his direction have received superior ratings at contests and festivals and performed for numerous prestigious clinics and conventions, including the Mid-West International Band and Orchestra Clinic, the American School Band Directors Association Clinic, the State Convention of the Ohio Music Education Association, the State Convention of the Illinois Music Education Association, and the Ohio Band Directors Conference. He has also been engaged in presenting premiere performances of compositions by leading composers, including Ned Rorem, Libby Larsen, Donald Erb, and W. Francis McBeth, among others, that have been highly praised by the composers. He is world-renowned for his knowledge and expertise of the works of Percy Granger, including directing bands in performances in Australia and Italy. As a professional woodwind performer, he has played with Stan Kenton, Max Roach, George Duke, Bill Watrous, Thad Jones, Dionne Warwick, James Galway, Itzhak Perlman, Midori, and Vladimir Ashkenazy, as well as a number of rock groups, including America, Kansas, and Sweet Thunder. He has also performed with numerous symphony orchestras throughout the U.S.

== Guest conducting and clinics ==
Dr. Hayslett is very active as a guest conductor, clinician, and adjudicator. He has presented clinics and workshops both nationally and regionally for various organizations including the Music Educators National Conference and the National Band Directors Workshop. In addition, he has served as guest conductor for numerous All-State and Regional Honor and Festival Bands throughout the United States and internationally. He is a contributor to Strategies for Teaching: Guide for Music Methods Classes, and Spotlight on Teaching Band, both published by MENC.

== Professional memberships ==
Hayslett’s professional affiliations and memberships include the National Band Association, the American School Band Directors Association, the College Band Directors National Association, and the Music Educators National Conference (MENC). Dr. Hayslett is past Vice-President of the New Mexico Music Educators Association, as well as serving on the Board of Trustees of VanderCook College of Music and as a member of the Editorial Board of the research journal Contributions to Music Education.

He also holds elected memberships in Phi Beta Mu and Pi Kappa Lambda and honorary memberships in Tau Beta Sigma and Kappa Kappa Psi.

== Research ==
Dr. Hayslett’s research that investigates aural perception, selective attention, movement training, and conducting pedagogy has been published in numerous educational journals. He developed a theory of Peripheral Hearing in musicians which was published in an award-winning dissertation in 1991.

== Other awards ==
Dr. Hayslett has been awarded the Citation of Excellence from the National Band Association as well as the prestigious Stanbury Award in 1984 from the American School Band Directors Association. In 1998 he was given the distinction of being selected for inclusion in Who’s Who Among America’s Teachers. Recently, the Helena Education Foundation conferred upon him a 2009 Distinguished Educator Award.
