= Boomer Sooner =

Fight song for the American University of Oklahoma

Song by The Pride of Oklahoma
- Released: 1905
- Genre: Fight song
- Songwriter: Arthur M. Alden

"Boomer Sooner" is the fight song for the University of Oklahoma (OU). The lyrics were written in 1905 by Arthur M. Alden, an OU student and son of a local jeweler in Norman. The tune is taken from "Boola Boola", the fight song of Yale University (which was itself borrowed from an 1898 song called "La Hoola Boola" by Robert Allen (Bob) Cole and Billy Johnson). A year later, an additional section was appended, borrowed from the University of North Carolina's "I'm a Tar Heel Born".

== Origin of the lyrics ==
The phrase "Boomer Sooner" refers to the Land Rush of 1889, in which the land around the modern university was settled — the so-called Unassigned Lands not part of any Native American nation or reservation through the 1880s. Boomers were people who lobbied for the lands to be opened (and raided into them illegally) before passage of the Indian Appropriations Act of 1889. Sooners were Boomers who snuck into the region to scout and claim the prime quarter-mile tracts before the official noon opening on April 22, 1889. If the charge of early entry was proven, these "Sooners" would lose title to their claimed land. The unique term "Sooner" was embraced as the University athletic teams' nickname by 1908, and by the 1920s was Oklahoma's defacto state nickname, "The Sooner State."

== Uses ==
The OU marching band plays the fight song when the team takes the field and when the team scores a touchdown, makes a big play, or makes a play in general. They also play it along with other fight songs while the Oklahoma defense is on the field to encourage the crowd to get loud. Some fans have informally counted it being played between 70 and 90 times a game.

ESPN writer Doug Ward has called the combined effect of "Boomer Sooner" and OU's horse-drawn Sooner Schooner wagon "as potent a one-two fight song/mascot punch as you'll find in college football."

== The day "The Pride" won ==
On October 15, 1983, the University of Oklahoma football team visited Oklahoma State University in Stillwater, Oklahoma. The Sooner squad played poorly at first, and within 10 minutes Oklahoma State was winning by a score of 20-3. A policeman escorted Gene Thrailkill, the Oklahoma band director, off the field for not having a sideline pass. Before he was forced to leave, Thrailkill shouted to the band members, "I want you to start playing and don't stop 'til the team's ahead!" The band complied and played "Boomer Sooner" non-stop roughly 300 times. The team responded by scoring 15 unanswered points against Oklahoma State. After a successful onside kick recovery with 1:17 left in the game, Oklahoma scored a field goal to win 21-20. OU coach Barry Switzer awarded the game ball to the band (known as "The Pride of Oklahoma") for the non-stop effort and labeled it "The Day The Pride Won".

== In popular culture ==
Professional wrestling announcer and Oklahoma native Jim Ross uses the fight song as his entrance theme. He also often uses the phrase "Boomer Sooner" to signify a good moment.

In recent years, "Boomer Sooner" has been adopted as a chant at Sooner football and basketball games. One side of Owen Field or the Lloyd Noble Center chants "Boomer!" with the other side chanting "Sooner!" The chant has frequently been heard at recent Heisman Trophy presentations, led by 1978 Heisman winner Billy Sims.

The tune of the song is also used for Albania's popular national song, "Shqipëri, atdhe i dashur!" ("Albania, dear fatherland!"), also known as the Alphabet Hymn. The tune was borrowed by Parashqevi Qiriazi, who penned patriotic lyrics to fit it, after the historic Congress of Manastir which decided the Albanian alphabet.
