= Philip Jameson =

American musician and educator (born 1941)

- Born: December 7, 1941 (age 84); Wooster, Ohio, U.S.
- Education: The Juilliard School (BM) (MS) Columbia University (MME)

Philip Jameson (born December 7, 1941, in Wooster, Ohio) graduated from Wooster High School in 1959 and attended Baldwin Wallace College for one year.

== Education ==
In the fall of 1960, he was accepted into The Juilliard School on a full scholarship. He was subsequently appointed principal trombone with the Juilliard Orchestra, a position he held for five years. He graduated from Juilliard with a Bachelor of Music degree in 1964 and a Master of Science degree in 1965. He then enrolled in Columbia University, receiving a Master of Music Education degree in 1967. He completed his Doctorate of Music in 1980. His Ph.D. dissertation was entitled "The effect of timbre conditions on the prompted and simultaneous pitch matching of three ability groups of trombone performers".

== Career ==
Jameson was the professor of trombone and music at the University of Georgia, where he founded the UGA Brass Quintet and the UGA Trombone Choir in the fall of 1967 to the spring of 2009, retiring as Distinguished Professor Emeritus. He is a lifetime member of the International Trombone Association and has had numerous articles published in the ITA Journal. Jameson is listed in The International Who's Who in Music and The Who's Who in American Music. Former students have earned places in major performing organizations across the world. During his tenure at the University of Georgia, former students substituted in orchestras ranging from the New York Philharmonic to the San Francisco Symphony.

Jameson was a charter member of Leopold Stokowski's American Symphony Orchestra at Carnegie Hall and the Mostly Mozart Orchestra at New York's Lincoln Center. He has also performed with the New York City Ballet, the Band of America, the Musica Aeterna Orchestra at the Metropolitan Museum of Art, the Radio City Music Hall Orchestra, and the American Wind Symphony Orchestra. He was a Fromm Foundation Fellow with the Boston Symphony Orchestra at Tanglewood, the recipient of the Juilliard School Naumburg Prize, the Sarah Moss Fellowship for doctoral study at Columbia University, and a Senior Fulbright Professorship with the National Symphony Orchestra of Korea. While on sabbaticals, he held teaching appointments at the Juilliard School, the Horace Mann School, the Queensland Conservatorium of Music, and Seoul National University. He was actively engaged in acoustical research and presented many papers in this area at national symposiums.

In 2005, trombone students of Jameson at the University of Georgia won three major trombone solo competitions in the U.S. David Nelson won first place in the US Army/ Eastern Trombone Workshop National Solo Competition in Washington, D.C. Charles Reneau won first place at the International Trombone Association Solo Competition in New Orleans and the Zellmer International Trombone Competition sponsored by the Minnesota Symphony Orchestra. Two of the four current trombonists with the New York Philharmonic, James Markey and Amanda Stewart Davidson, were students of Jameson at the Interlochen Arts Camp, where he taught from 1984 to 2004. Other students who have studied with Jameson at the University of Georgia have attained professional positions with major orchestras including the St. Louis Symphony Orchestra, Gerry Pagano; the Oregon Symphony Orchestra, Charles Reneau; and Steve Norrell of the Metropolitan Opera Orchestra.

== University of Georgia Trombone Choir ==
Jameson founded the University of Georgia Trombone Choir in 1967, one of the longest-standing premier trombone ensembles in the United States. In recognition of his teaching excellence and musical direction, the trombone choir has received regular invitations to perform at both national and international conferences, several of which are listed below.

13 Invited Ensemble Performances at the International Trombone Association's Eastern Trombone Workshop, 1975 - 2007. U.S. Army Band, Washington, D.C., 1992–2002, yearly. U.S. Navy Band, Washington, D.C., 1984. University of Miami, 1983. Florida State University, 1982. Florida State University, 1981. Townsend State University, 1979. Townsend State University, 1975.

Invited Ensemble Performances, Georgia Music Educators' Convention, Savannah, GA. 2002, 2001, 2000 1999,1998,1986,1985, 1982, 1978 Invited Ensemble Performance Southern Division Music Educators National Conference, Savannah, Georgia, 2003

== Former private applied trombone teachers 1956–1967 ==
- Jack Emig, former member of the United States Navy Band and high school band director in Wooster, Ohio. 1955–1957
- Robert Paolucci, former first trombone of the CBS Symphony and retired teacher in Akron, Ohio. 1957–1959
- Charles Gorham, brass instructor at the Baldwin Wallace College in Berea, Ohio. 1959–1960
- Robert Boyd, principal trombone of the Cleveland Symphony Orchestra. 1960
- Davis Shuman, trombone professor at The Juilliard School. 1960
- Roger Smith, trombone professor at The Juilliard School. 1960–1965
- William Gibson, principal trombone of the Boston Symphony Orchestra. 1962
- Lewis Van Haney, second trombone of the New York Philharmonic. 1961–1964
- Alan Ostrander, bass trombone of the New York Philharmonic and professor at Columbia University. 1965–1967
- Gordon Pulis, former principal trombone of the New York Philharmonic. 1965–1967

== Performance and creative activities as trombonist/conductor ==
As a founding member of the University of Georgia (UGA) Brass Quintet, many of Jameson's performances were with that group. The highlights of the UGA Brass Quintet's international performances have been their 1987 month-long concert tour of the Pacific Rim, their 1990 tour of Finland, and their 1998 concert tour to Narbonne, France. Listed below are other significant performances.

== International performances ==
- Director of UGA Trombone Choir Concert at the 2002 International Trombone Association's Eastern Trombone Workshop, sponsored by the US Army Band, Washington D.C., March 2002. This program slot was shared with the Juilliard Trombone Choir, directed by Joseph Alessi, Principal Trombone of the New York Philharmonic. Former UGA trombone student and current Metropolitan Opera Member, Steve Norrell, was the UGA Trombone Choir's guest soloist. This concert marked the 13th invited appearance of the UGA Trombone choir at this international event.
- Invited workshop presentation for the 2004 Trombonanza in Argentina
- International Brass Quintet Competition and Festival sponsored by UGA Brass Department, March 1999 and 2001
- Georgia Brass, several concerts at the 1998 Narbonne (France) International Brass Quintet Competition as part of the 15-member Georgia Brass, May 1998.
- Georgia Brass Quintet Concert, King Sejong Hotel, Seoul, Korea, Spring 1987.
- Georgia Brass Quintet Concert, Seoul Arts Academy, Seoul, Korea, Spring, 1987.
- Georgia Brass Quintet Concert, Yu Kwan Sun Memorial Hall, Seoul, Korea, Spring 1987.
- Georgia Brass Quintet Concert, Seoul Union Church, Seoul, Korea, Spring 1987.
- Georgia Brass Quintet Concert, Seoul Foreign School, Seoul, Korea, Spring 1987.
- Clinic, "Instructional Models for the Trombonist," for Korean Trombone Association, Seoul, Korea, Spring 1987.
- Georgia Brass Quintet Concert, Inca Olympus Hotel, Inchon, Korea, Spring 1987.
- Georgia Brass Quintet Concert, Korean Broadcasting System taping for broadcast, Seoul, Korea, Spring 1987.
- Georgia Brass Quintet Concert, Healien Cultural Center, Healien, Taiwan, Spring 1987.
- Georgia Brass Quintet Concert, Taichung Cultural Center, Taichung, Taiwan, Spring 1987.
- Georgia Brass Quintet Concert, Changhwa Ta Tung Junior Middle School, Chungwa, Taiwan, Spring 1987.
- Georgia Brass Quintet Concert, Kaoshing High School of Music, Kaoshing, Taiwan, Spring 1987.
- Georgia Brass Quintet Concert, Nantou Cultural Center, Nantou, Taiwan, Spring 1987.
- Georgia Brass Quintet Concert, Taipei Shih-Chen Hall, Taipei, Taiwan, Spring 1987
- Clinic, "Instructional Models for the Trombonist," for college and professional trombonists in Taipei, Taiwan, Spring 1987.
- Georgia Brass Quintet Concert, Hong Kong International School, Hong Kong, Spring 1987.
- Georgia Brass Quintet Concert, Shanghai Conservatory of Music, Shanghai, People's Republic of China, Spring 1987.
- Georgia Brass Quintet Concert II, Shanghai Conservatory of Music, Shanghai, People's Republic of China, Spring 1987.
- Georgia Brass Quintet Concert, American Consulate, Shanghai, People's Republic of China, Spring 1987.
- Georgia Brass Quintet Concert, Australian Consulate, Shanghai, People's Republic of China, Spring 1987.
- Georgia Brass Quintet Performances (2), Convocations of the University of New Brunswick, Canada, Fall 1985.
- Georgia Brass Quintet Concert, University of New Brunswick, Fredericton, New Brunswick, Canada, Fall 1985.
- Georgia Brass Quintet Concert, University of New Brunswick, Saint John, New Brunswick, Canada, Fall 1985.

== Additional performance activities ==
- Member of the Canton and Akron Symphony Orchestras. 1957–1959
- Charter member of the Ohio Light Opera Company in Wooster, Ohio
- Member of the New Jersey Wind Symphony
- Member of the New Sousa Band
- Member of the Jimmy Sturr Polka Band at Madison Square Garden
- Member of the National Orchestral Association in New York City. 1960–1962
- Performance with Louis Armstrong's band in Washington, D.C. 1962

== Honors received for academic/music achievement ==
- Charter recipient of the first Fine Arts Hall of Fame award presented by the city of Wooster
- Omicron Delta Kappa, 1960
- Pi Kappa Lambda, 1971
- Phi Mu Alpha, 1969
- Alpha Tau Omega, 1960
- International Trombone Association, life member, 1975
- Music Educators National Conference, 1965
- Interlochen Center for the Arts, Alumni Board of Directors, 1990–1996
- Orpheus Award, Phi Mu Alpha Sinfonia fraternity, Epsilon Lambda chapter, April 25, 2009
- Classic City Band

== Printed sources ==
- Who's Who in American Music, edited by J.C. Press: R.R. Bowker Co. N.Y., London, Classical, Second Edition, 1995.
- Who's Who in America, published by Marquis, New Providence, NJ 59th and 60th editions, 2004, 2006.
- Appointed by the Department of State as Visiting Fulbright Professor of Music to the National Symphony Orchestra of Korea and Seoul National University, 1978.
- National Artist of Merit Award, Korean Ministry of Culture, 1978.
- Appointed Voting Member, National Academy of Recording Arts and Sciences (NARAS/Grammy Awards), 1975.
- Moss Foundation Fellowship for Graduate Study at Columbia University, 1973 and 1974.
- Sarah and Walter Naumburg Award for Graduate Study at the Juilliard School of Music, 1964-65.
- Fromm Foundation Fellowship Award, Tanglewood Festival Orchestra, 1962. Recording Industries Trust Fund Award, American Federation of Musicians, American Wind Symphony Orchestra, 1961.
