= Marvin Lamb =

American composer and conductor (born 1946)

- Born: Marvin Lee Lamb; July 12, 1946 (age 79); Jacksonville, Texas
- Occupation: Composer
- Years active: 1968–present

Marvin Lee Lamb (born July 12, 1946) is an American composer, music pedagogue and conductor.

== Life ==
Lamb was born in Jacksonville, Texas, studied at Sam Houston State University in Huntsville, Texas and received a Bachelor of Music in music theory and composition. He then studied at the University of North Texas in Denton and received a Master of Music. He completed his studies at the University of Illinois at Urbana–Champaign in Urbana and earned a Doctor of Musical Arts in composition. His teachers include John Butler, William P. Latham and Paul Zonn as well as electronic music and computer techniques with Herbert Brun and John Melby.

He worked at Atlantic Christian College, now Barton College, (1973–1977), at the Peabody College in Nashville, Tennessee (1977–1979), from 1980 to 1983 at Southern Methodist University in Dallas, from 1983 to 1989 at Tennessee Tech University, and from 1989 to 1998 he served as dean of the school of music and held the Yeager Endowed Professorship of Composition at Baylor University, at which point he became dean of the Weitzenhoffer Family College of Fine Arts at the University of Oklahoma (1998-2005). He is currently professor of music at the University of Oklahoma.

As a composer he writes works for different genres, with performances in Europe, Japan, Mexico, Argentina and Canada. He is a member of the American Society of Composers, Authors and Publishers (ASCAP), the fraternities Pi Kappa Lambda and Phi Mu Alpha Sinfonia, the American Music Center, the Southern Association of Colleges and Schools College Consulting Network and former president of the Texas Association of Music Schools.

== Compositions ==
=== Works for orchestra ===
- 1972 Movements for trumpet, percussion, and string orchestra
- 1977 Concerto for Tenor Saxophone and Orchestra
- 1985 J.B. II, for picc., Dbl. Fl., Eng. Hrn., Dbl. Ob., and orchestra
- 1987 Overture for orchestra
- 1987 The Eagle has landed, for speaker, harp, piano, orchestra and narrator
- 2010 Bop!, concertino for Theater Organ and Orchestra
- 2011 For Franco/Delicatissimo, for orchestra

=== Works for band ===
- 1985 Igor Fantasy, for band
- 2001 Sacred Ground, Fanfare for band

=== Musical theatre ===
==== Incidental music ====
- 2010 The Dada Play – Incidental Music and Solo Songs, for tenor, mezzo-soprano, guitar, piano and vocal ensemble – text: Mieko Ouchi

=== Vocal music ===
==== Works for choir ====
- 1978 Sitio, for 3 vocal soloists, SATB choir, brass trio, organ, and percussion – text: David Cassel
- 1981 The Annunciation, for Handbell choir, trompet, and SATB choir – text: Rainer Maria Rilke "Annunciation to Mary"
- 2008 Bless This House, for SATB choir, brass quintet and piano

==== Solo vocal works ====
- 1970 Life Cycle, for tenor, flute, trumpet, and bassoon
- 1975 Lullabye on a text by George Barker, for soprano, clarinet, oboe, and piano

=== Chamber music ===
- 1968 Structures, for trombone and piano
- 1970 Prairie Suite, for brass quintet
- 1973 Woodwind Quintet
- 1973 In Memoriam, Benjy, for saxophone quartet
- 1974 Regards Broussards, for clarinet and trombone
- 1971 Solowalk, for flute
- 1973 The Professor March and Rag, six speakers/actors
- 1979 Ballad of Roland, for alto saxophone and tinwhistle
- 1981 Serenade for unknown friends, for oboe, clarinet, tenor saxophone, and piano
- 1984 Music for Julius Baker, for flute choir
- 1984 Vision of Basque, for bassoon
- 1984 Heavy metal, for 5 tubas
- 1985 Prism, for trombone, piano, and percussion
- 1986 Final Roland, for alto saxophone, whistle siren, piano, and harmonica
- 1986 The Stomp Revisited, for brass quintet
- 2006 A Fit Reliquary, for brass quintet and percussion orchestra (10 players)
- 2008 Lamentations, for string quartet
- 2008 Grappelli Dreams, for alto saxophone and viola
- 2008 House of Dawn, for 4 violas (or viola ensemble)
- 2010 Pablo/Saul, for piccolo/flute, Eb, Bb, Bass Bb Cl, violin, cello, piano, and percussion
- 2011 Fantasy, for viola and piano

=== Intermedia works ===
- 1972 Intonazione, for prepared tape, lights, and sculpture

== Publications ==
- The musical, literary and graphic influences upon Luciano Berio's Thema, Omaggio a Joyce, DMA Thesis – University of Illinois at Urbana-Champaign, 1977. 115 p.

== Bibliography ==
- Wolfgang Suppan, Armin Suppan: Das Neue Lexikon des Blasmusikwesens, 4. Auflage, Freiburg-Tiengen, Blasmusikverlag Schulz GmbH, 1994, ISBN 3-923058-07-1
- Paul E. Bierley, William H. Rehrig: The Heritage Encyclopedia of Band Music – Composers and Their Music, Westerville, Ohio: Integrity Press, 1991, ISBN 0-918048-08-7
- Jean-Marie Londeix: Musique pour saxophone, volume II : répertoire général des oeuvres et des ouvrages d' enseignement pour le saxophone, Cherry Hill: Roncorp Publications, 1985.
- E. Ruth Anderson: Contemporary American Composers – A Biographical Dictionary, Second edition, Boston: G. K. Hall, 1982, 578 p., ISBN 978-0-816-18223-7
