= Play Like a Champion Today =

American college football slogan

Play Like a Champion Today is a saying written on a sign in the 1940s by Bud Wilkinson, the coach of the University of Oklahoma Sooners football team, to inspire the players as they entered Owen Field. It is located overhead in the tunnel leading out to the field in the south end zone at the renamed Oklahoma Memorial Stadium. The University of Notre Dame Fighting Irish football program later began using the saying as well.

== University of Oklahoma ==
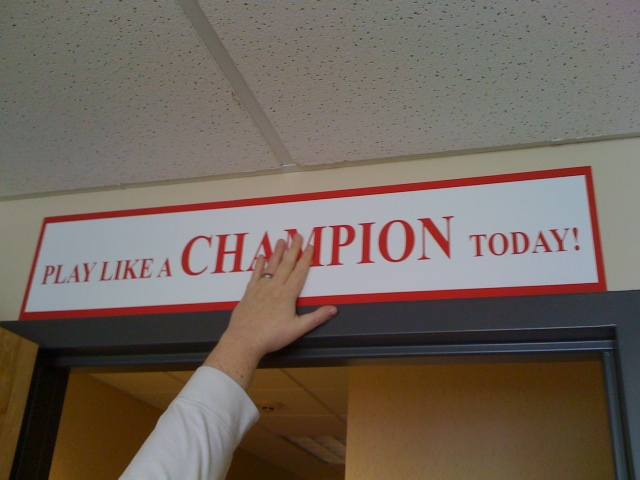
The Play Like a Champion Today sign for away games.

The University of Oklahoma Sooners football team has used a sign with the phrase since the late 1940s, under coach Bud Wilkinson. Traditional during home games at Gaylord Family Oklahoma Memorial Stadium Oklahoma players and coaches touch the "Play Like a Champion Today" sign posted above the locker room doors as they head into the tunnel that leads to the field before every home game. For away games a travel version is posted by equipment staff for the players to touch as they depart the locker room for the field.

As the team enters the field, the Sooners run under a crimson banner that displays 'Play Like a Champion' that is flanked by flags representing each of Oklahoma's seven national championships.

== University of Notre Dame ==
Poster of Notre Dame's sign

The term has been used by Notre Dame Fighting Irish football since at least 1986 when Lou Holtz came across a photo in a Notre Dame book with the sign “Play Like A Champion Today.” After asking around and coming up with no one remembering the sign and what had happened to it, he had a new sign painted and placed in a stairwell between the home team locker room and the tunnel to the field of Notre Dame Stadium. This original sign was painted by Laurie Wenger in the fall of 1986.

It is a tradition by players to touch it on their way out of the locker room. Above the sign is a listing of Notre Dame's eleven national championships.

In 1991, the University granted Wenger exclusive marketing rights to the phrase. In 2004, with the support of the University the sign became the registered trademark of Play Like a Champion Today, Inc. Since that time, the University and PLACT, Inc. jointly license companies to produce co-branded products.
