= Brian A. Britt =

Director of The Pride of Oklahoma

Brian A. Britt is assistant director of the school of music, assistant professor of music, and director of The Pride of Oklahoma Marching Band at the University of Oklahoma. Britt is only the fifth person to hold the position since the first full-time director of The Pride was hired in 1929.

As assistant director and coordinator of undergraduate studies, Britt oversees the entire undergraduate program for the OU School of Music. He is conductor of the OU Symphony Band. He instructs music education students in conducting, and upper-division and graduate students in marching band administration and techniques.

== Education ==
Britt was born in Tampa, Florida, raised in Durant, Oklahoma, and graduated from Durant High School in 1983. He attended the University of Oklahoma and was a member of The Pride as an undergraduate, ultimately becoming The Pride's percussion section leader. Britt earned his bachelor's degree in music education in 1987, which was the year The Pride received the Sudler Trophy, and remained at OU as a percussion graduate assistant for The Pride in 1987. As a graduate assistant, he was responsible for creating and organizing audition materials for the OU Drumline, arranging percussion scores for all shows, and preparing the drumline for performances. In addition, he designed and implemented an off-season drumline training program.

While serving The Pride in this capacity, Britt also worked full-time at Norman High School as their assistant director of bands. He became the director of bands at Chickasha High School in 1989, and continued his graduate studies on a part-time basis.

After graduating from OU with a master's degree in music (percussion) in 1992, Britt worked throughout Texas as assistant director and director of bands for public schools and universities. At Texas Christian University, he was interim associate director of bands, and at Stephen F. Austin University, he was associate director of bands and director of the Lumberjack Marching Band. Britt was the director at McNeil High School in Round Rock, Texas, when he was hired as the Director of The Pride in 2001. He succeeded Gene Thrailkill, who had led The Pride for 30 years, including the years Britt attended OU.

== Director of The Pride ==
As The Pride's director, Britt leads an instructional staff and team of three faculty, six graduate assistants, and 40 student leaders, who prepare The Pride for its many performances and public appearances representing the University and the Oklahoma Sooners. Britt has responsibility for all aspects of the band's performance, including research, planning, and production design for all shows, trip planning for all away games, coordination with the OU Department of Athletics for all football and basketball events, administration of both the department's budget and its scholarship budget, and coordination of the graduate staff's teaching and logistical responsibilities.

Britt is the faculty advisor for the Delta chapters of Kappa Kappa Psi and Tau Beta Sigma, and he is the immediate past governor of the Southwest District of Kappa Kappa Psi, serving as an advisor to chapters on all college campuses in New Mexico, Arkansas, Louisiana, Texas, and Oklahoma. He also chairs and serves on various University committees and campaigns, including as the faculty chair of OU's Annual Campus Development Campaign, the Undergraduate Studies Committee, and as a member of the Football Game Operations Committee.

Outside of OU, Britt is active nationally as a clinician, guest conductor, lecturer, adjudicator, percussion arranger, drill designer, and consultant. He has conducted an extensive repertoire of concert band music, including two world premieres, and has produced and recorded several CDs. Britt has presented sessions and served on panel discussions at the National Athletic Band Symposium in 2004 and 2005, and he is the recording secretary of the Big 12 Band Directors Association. His professional associations include the College Band Directors National Association, Oklahoma Music Educators Association, Phi Beta Mu, Pi Kappa Lambda, Kappa Kappa Psi, Phi Mu Alpha Sinfonia, Tau Beta Sigma (honorary), and Kiwanis International.

Britt lives in Norman, Oklahoma with his wife, Alicia, and their daughter Avery.

It was announced on October 4, 2012, that Britt will be stepping down from his position at OU to accept a position as the director of fine arts for the Richardson (TX) Independent School District. This change was effective February 1, 2013. He was replaced by Dr. Justin Stolarik. On October 23, 2014 Justin Stolarik resigned, upon his resignation OU president David Boren invited Britt to return to the university. Britt will also be the associate dean of the Weitzenhoffer College of Fine Arts. Britt will begin immediately to resume the prides preparations for its upcoming performances.

== See also ==
- Front ensemble
- The Sudler Trophy
- Weitzenhoffer Family College of Fine Arts - The University of Oklahoma
