= Frances Walker-Slocum =

American educator, pianist, and organist (1924–2018)

- Born: March 6, 1924; Washington, D.C., U.S.
- Died: June 9, 2018 (aged 94); Oberlin, Ohio, U.S.
- Education: Oberlin Conservatory of Music Curtis Institute of Music Columbia University
- Occupations: Educator, pianist

Frances Walker-Slocum (March 6, 1924 - June 9, 2018) was an American educator, pianist, and organist, and the first tenured African-American female professor at the Oberlin Conservatory of Music, the first conservatory in the United States to admit black students.

Walker-Slocum was the younger sister of composer George Walker, the first African-American to win the Pulitzer Prize for Music.

In 1950, Walker-Slocum was married to Henry Chester Slocum Jr., a fellow Oberlin alumnus in New York City. She had one son, George Jeffrey Slocum. She had one granddaughter through George Jeffrey Slocum, Amber Poirier-Slocum. She had two great grandchildren before her death, one granddaughter and one grandson.

== Early life and education ==
Frances Walker-Slocum was born March 6, 1924, in Washington, D.C.. She began her musical training at four and a half. At five, her right arm was severely burned after her dress caught fire while she was playing with matches. She was hospitalized for a year, during which she underwent several operations, ultimately leaving her right arm shorter and weaker than the left, and its movement hindered. However, she continued to study music. After four years of private study, she enrolled in the Junior Preparatory Department of Howard University, where she gave her first full recital in the university's chapel in 1941. That same year, after graduating from Dunbar High School, Walker-Slocum entered the Oberlin Conservatory of Music where she studied piano and organ. She graduated in 1945 as a member of Pi Kappa Lambda, after which she studied for a year at the Curtis Institute in Philadelphia, Pennsylvania.

In 1952, she received a M.A. from Columbia University Teachers' College, and in 1971, she received a professional diploma for completing doctoral credit requirements.

== Career ==
Walker-Slocum began her teaching career in 1947 at Barber-Scotia College in Concord, North Carolina. A year later, she joined the faculty of Tougaloo College in Mississippi where she met her husband. However, they relocated from Tougaloo to New York City due to Mississippi state laws prohibiting interracial marriage. From 1957 to 1964, she was a piano instructor at the Third Street Settlement School in New York City. She returned to academia in 1968 as the pianist-in-residence at Lincoln University. In 1972, she was appointed as an assistant professor of Piano at Rutgers University, where she remained a faculty member until her husband's death in June 1980.

Walker-Slocum made her debut at Carnegie Hall in 1959. Throughout the 60s and 70s, she performed multiple times at Carnegie Hall, including performances with the orchestra and the 1975 Concert of Black American Composers. Other notable performances include concerts at the Kennedy Center, the Lincoln Center, the Brooklyn Museum, New York City Town Hall, and the National Gallery of Art, as well as two European tours to major halls in London, Amsterdam, Berlin, and the Amerika Hauser in Germany.

In 1976, Walker-Slocum was invited to return to Oberlin to perform. Shortly after, she was appointed as a Visiting associate professor of Pianoforte from 1976 to 1977. In 1979, she received tenure as an associate professor, followed by promotion to a full professor in November 1981, and from 1985 to 1986, she served as the Piano Departmental Chairman. She remained at Oberlin until her retirement in 1991.
