= OU Chant =

Song by The Pride of Oklahoma
- Released: 1936
- Genre: alma mater
- Songwriter(s): Jessie Lone Clarkson Gilkey

The OU Chant is the alma mater of the University of Oklahoma.

The chant was written in 1936 by Jessie Lone Clarkson Gilkey, the coach of the OU girl's glee club from 1936 to 1938. It is played by The Pride of Oklahoma and sung by fans and alumni during pregame festivities prior to home football games in Oklahoma Memorial Stadium. The Chant is played and/or sung at other official University gatherings and sporting events.
