= The Pride of Oklahoma Marching Band =

Marching band of the University of Oklahoma

The Pride of Oklahoma
- School: The University of Oklahoma
- Location: Norman, Oklahoma
- Conference: SEC
- Founded: 1904
- Director: Brian Britt
- Assistant Director: Eric Shannon
- Members: 342
- Fight song: "Boomer Sooner"
- Website: https://www.ou.edu/finearts/music/bands/

The Pride of Oklahoma Marching Band, known as "The Pride", is the student marching band for the University of Oklahoma Sooners.

== Early years ==
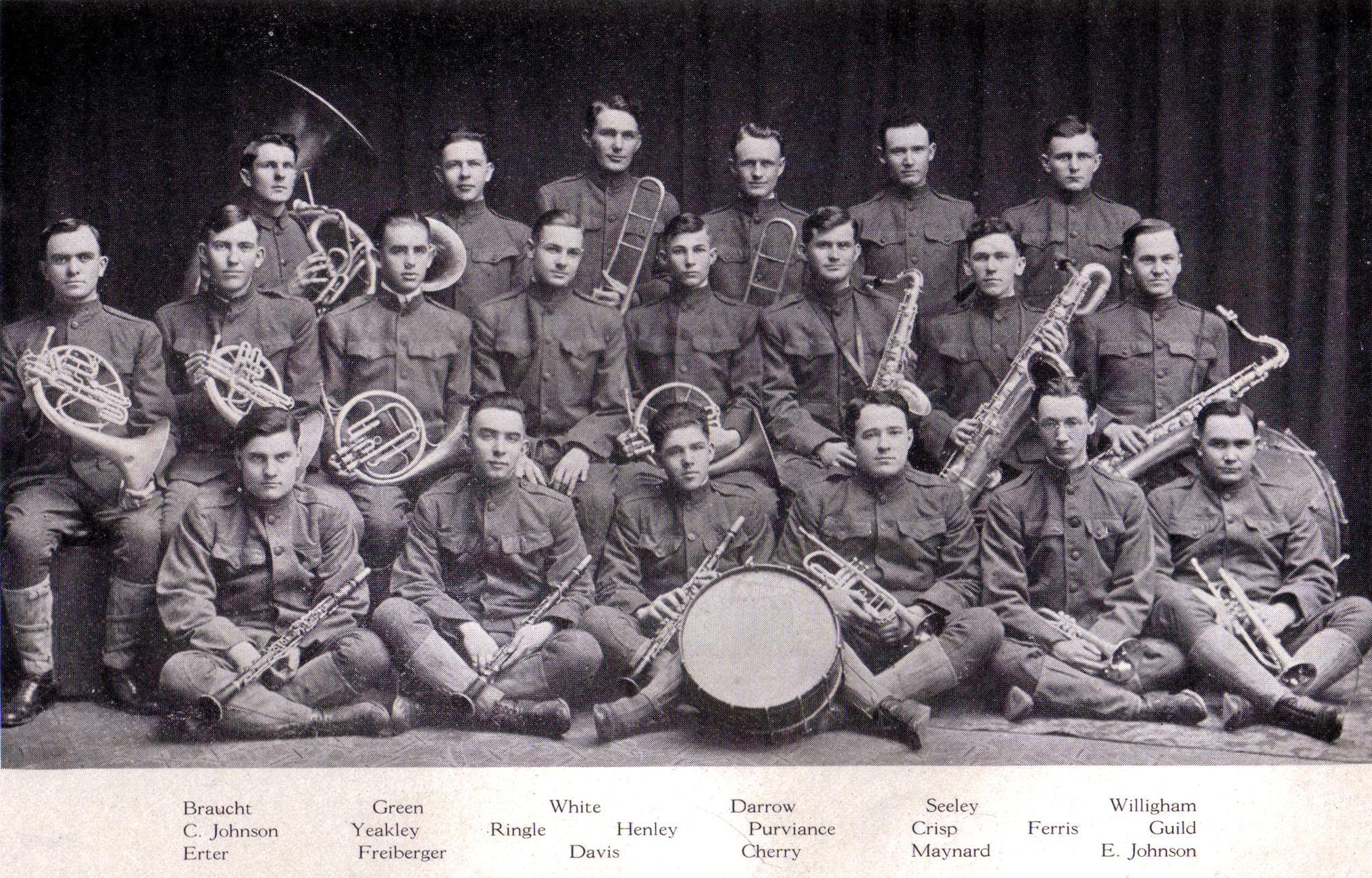
The University Band in 1915.

The Pride was founded in 1904 as a pep band to play at Sooner football games. In the early years of the university, the band was composed mostly of Norman residents and was disbanded every year after football season.

The first continuous student band was founded in 1904 by Lloyd Curtis, himself a Sooner freshman. The band branched out and began playing at other athletic events. Eventually, they started playing non-athletic events also, including concerts and parades. The band marched in the parade celebrating the inauguration of the first Oklahoma governor, Charles N. Haskell. A military band was created during World War I but was kept separate from the university band.

In 1929, the university hired its first full-time faculty member, William R. Wehrend, whose primary responsibility was to direct the band program. He devised numerous ways of promoting the band. He was one of the first band directors to have an annual high school Band Day event. In 1934, he organized a publicity stunt to set the record for the world's longest drum roll. Ten hours later, it was successful. Wehrend was one of the first directors to admit women into a band program, in 1934.

== Directors ==
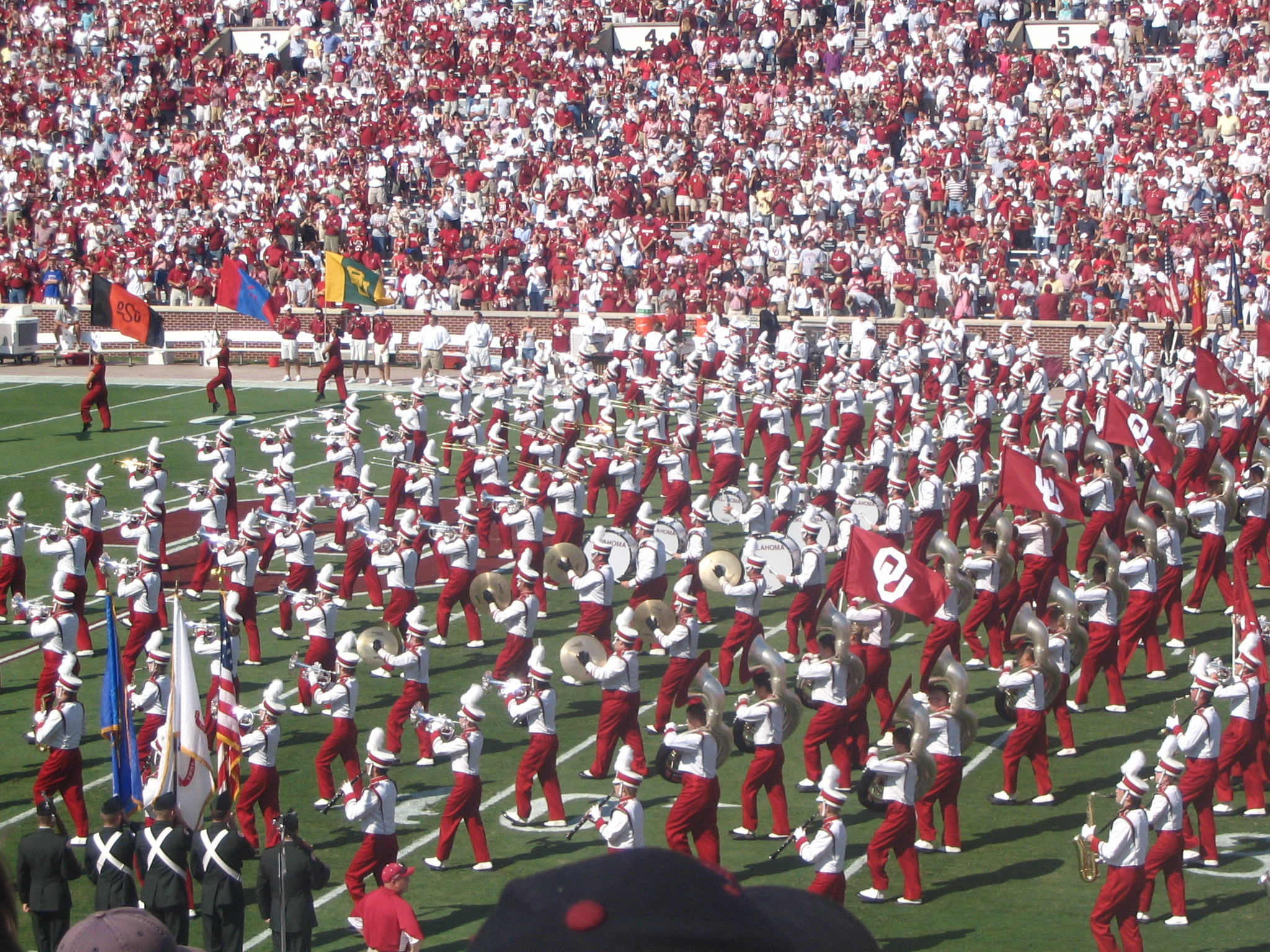
The Pride of Oklahoma Marching Band in pregame performance.

With the success of the football program in the 1950s, so increased the visibility of the Pride. Their halftime programs, centered on themes that would incorporate well-known songs of the day, were soon being broadcast on television during games. They received the grand prize as the best overall unit in the 200-unit 1961 National Cherry Blossom Festival Parade held in Washington, D.C.

Since the 1950s, the Pride has been under the leadership of several different band directors and with those directors came different styles. The 1960s saw band director Gene Brought bring a style of precision marching filled with intricate routines creating geometric shapes and lines.

Gene "Coach" Thrailkill transitioned the Pride to emphasize technique and sound – but not at the expense of the overriding goal to support the Sooners. During the 1983 Bedlam game at Oklahoma State in Stillwater, the Sooners fell behind 20–3 early in the 4th quarter. Stillwater police took Thrailkill off the field for not having a sideline pass. Incensed, Thrailkill told the Pride to "start playing and don't stop until we're ahead!" The band complied, and played "Boomer Sooner" non-stop – and after roughly 300 times, the Sooners were ahead 21–20. Barry Switzer and the Sooners awarded the Pride the game ball, and labeled it "The Day The Pride Won" as proof.

In 1987, the Pride was awarded the prestigious Sudler Trophy, the equivalent of the Heisman Trophy for university bands and an award no band may be awarded twice. As of 2006, the Sudler Trophy has been awarded 25 times; the Pride was the sixth recipient of the award.

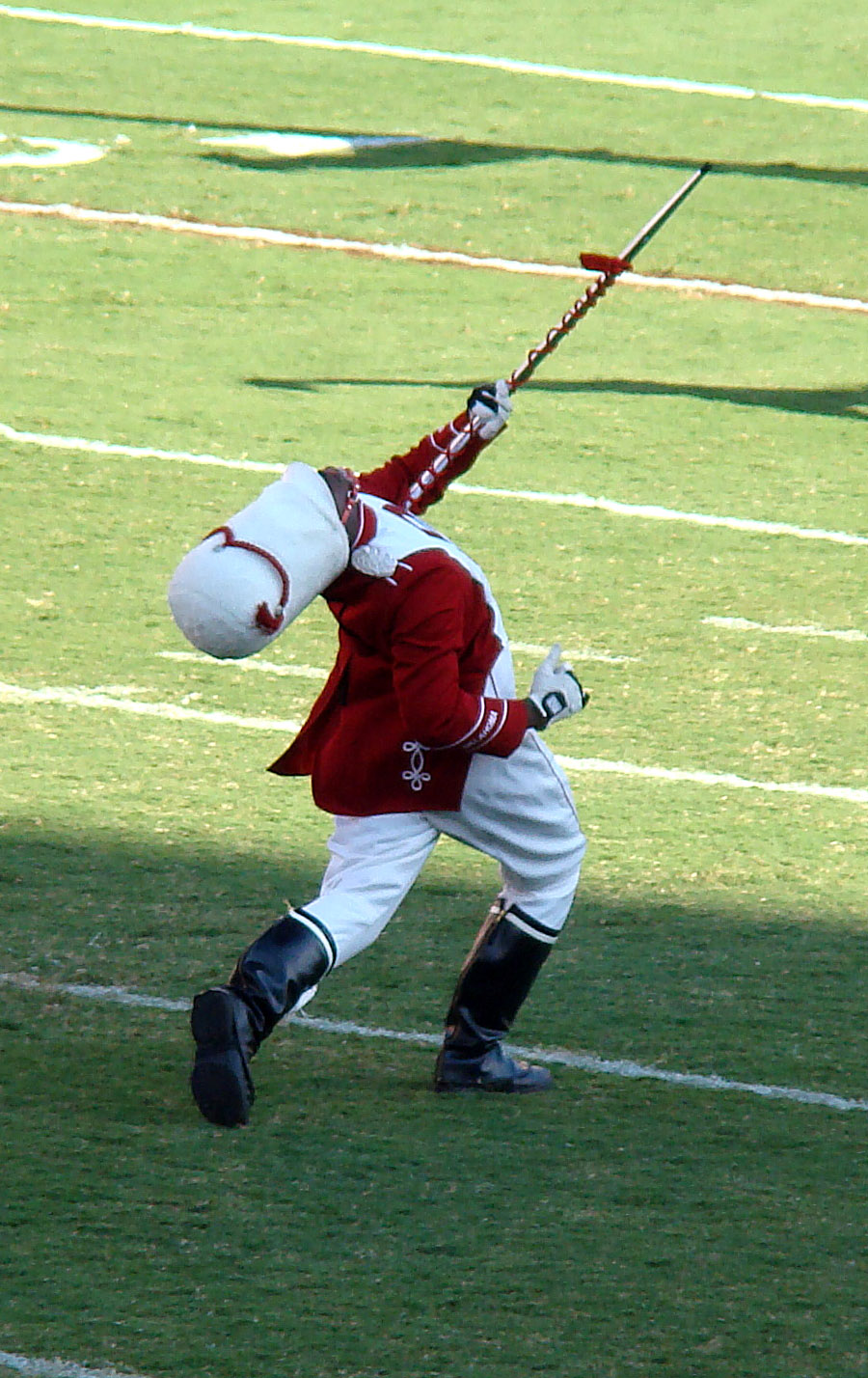
2007 Drum Major Chauvin Aaron leads the Pride during its pregame performance before the Sooners play the University of North Texas Mean Green on 2007-09-01.

Thrailkill also introduced the current pre-game show, which has been used continuously in one form or another for over 35 years. In 2011, Bleacher Report ranked the Pride's pre-game show the third best pre-game show in college football.

== A Second Century of Pride ==
Upon Thrailkill's retirement in 2001, Brian Britt was named Director of the Pride of Oklahoma. Mr. Britt, himself a graduate of the University of Oklahoma, was a member of the band in 1987 when the ensemble received the Sudler Trophy. Mr. Britt made evolutionary changes to the band's performances, and the repertoire continued to be mostly arrangements by OU professor Dr. Roland Barrett. Stand tunes and cadences were updated throughout the decade to reflect popular music themes and add diversity to musical performances in the stands. The uniforms also evolved with the addition of red uniform tops, different pant styles, and updating the OU logo. Mr. Britt implemented a student leadership program with an emphasis on mentoring students by holding leadership retreats, regular meals with students, and asking for student input in planning future shows.

On November 22, 2007, six days after Oklahoma marked 100 years as an American state, the Pride made its first trip to New York City to be Oklahoma's representative in the Macy's Thanksgiving Day Parade. The band debuted a new uniform coat during the parade, and returned to Oklahoma in time to support the Sooners against the Oklahoma State Cowboys on November 24.

Debra Traficante, a former Graduate Assistant at the University of Oklahoma, became assistant director in 2010.

As of January 1, 2013, Dr. Debra Traficante assumed the title and position of Interim Director of the Pride of Oklahoma, following Brian Britt's announcement that he would be taking the position of Director of Fine Arts for Richardson Independent School District in Richardson, TX.

Dr. Justin Stolarik was named the Director of the Pride of Oklahoma for the 2013 season after serving on staff for the University of Wisconsin Marching Band. On October 23, 2014, Justin Stolarik resigned as director of the Pride. Upon his resignation Boren invited former director Brian Britt to return to the position, Britt will also be associate dean of the Weitzenhoffer College of Fine Arts.

== Traditional songs ==
In attendance at all home and away football games, the Pride performs a variety of music.

- "Boomer Sooner"
- "Boomer 2"
- "Boomer 3"
- "Oklahoma"
- "Oklahoma 1"
- "Oklahoma 2"
- "Oklahoma 3"
- "OK Oklahoma"
- "Oklahoma Hail!"
- "Fight for OKU"
- "El Toro"
- "Crazy Train"
- "William Tell"
- "Go Big Red"
- "OU Chant"
- "Mortal Kombat"
- "Eat 'em Up 1"
- "Eat 'em Up 2"
- “We Will Rock You”
- “Another One Bites the Dust”
- "Industry Baby"
- "Hey Song"
- "N95"
- "No Hands"
