= Belvoir, Virginia =

Unincorporated community in Virginia, United States

- Unincorporated community
- Location within the state of Virginia Belvoir (Virginia) Belvoir (the United States)
- Coordinates: 38°39′27″N 77°43′01″W
- Country: United States
- State: Virginia
- County: Fauquier
- Time zone: UTC−5 (Eastern (EST))
  - Summer (DST): UTC−4 (EDT)
- ZIP codes: 20189

Belvoir is a small unincorporated community in Fauquier County, Virginia, United States. It is situated between the towns of Marshall and The Plains. It is off US Route 17, at the crossroads of the John Marshall Highway (State Route 55), Zulla Road (State Route 709), and Belvoir Road (State Route 709).

== History ==
Railroad president Fairfax Harrison and his wife Hetty moved to their family farm, Belvoir, in Fauquier County in 1907, returning to New York in each winter.

Because of the development of Marshall and The Plains, Belvoir as a hamlet has lost local relevance. The area is usually referred to as The Plains because it shares its ZIP Code of 20189.
