= Recording artist royalties =

Recording artist royalties are a vital part of an artist's income and are gained through the digital and retail sale of their music along with the use of their music in streaming services, broadcasting, and in other forms of media such as TV shows and films.
