= Big 12 Conference =

American collegiate athletics conference

- Association: NCAA
- Founded: February 25, 1994; 32 years ago
- Commissioner: Brett Yormark (since 2022)
- Sports fielded: 25; men's: 10; women's: 15
- Division: Division I
- Subdivision: FBS
- No. of teams: 16
- Headquarters: Irving, Texas
- Region: South; South Atlantic; West South Central; Midwest; East North Central; West North Central; West; Mountain; Southwest
- Broadcasters: ABC/ESPN/ESPN2/ESPNU Fox/FS1; TNT/TBS/TruTV(via ESPN); CBS/CBSSN (via ESPN) NBCSN
- Streaming partners: ESPN Fox One; HBO Max; Paramount+ Peacock
- Website: big12sports.com

Locations

The Big 12 Conference (stylized XII) is a collegiate athletic conference in the United States. It consists of 16 full-member universities (3 private universities and 13 public universities) in the states of Arizona, Colorado, Florida, Iowa, Kansas, Ohio, Oklahoma, Texas, Utah, and West Virginia. It is headquartered in Irving, Texas.

The Big 12 is a member of the Division I of the National Collegiate Athletic Association (NCAA) for all sports. Its football teams compete in the Football Bowl Subdivision (FBS; formerly Division I-A), the higher of two levels of NCAA Division I football competition.

The Big 12 is one of the Power Four conferences, the four highest-earning and most historically successful FBS football conferences. Power Four conferences are guaranteed at least one bid to a New Year's Six bowl game and have been granted exemptions from certain NCAA rules.

The Big 12 is a 501(c)(3) nonprofit organization. Brett Yormark became the commissioner on August 1, 2022.

The Big 12 was founded in February 1994. All eight members of the former Big Eight Conference joined with half the members of the former Southwest Conference (Baylor, Texas, Texas A&M, and Texas Tech) to form the conference, with play beginning in 1996.

In 2011, Colorado and Nebraska left the conference to join the Pac-12 and Big Ten, respectively. One year later, Missouri and Texas A&M departed for the Southeastern Conference, and TCU and West Virginia joined. These changes are known as the 2010–2013 Big 12 Conference realignment.

BYU, Cincinnati, Houston, and UCF joined the conference for the 2023–2024 season. The next season Arizona, Arizona State, and Utah joined the conference, Colorado rejoined, and Texas and Oklahoma left as part of a more extensive NCAA conference realignment.

== Member universities ==
=== Full members ===
Institution	Location	Founded	Type	Enrollment (fall 2025)	Median earnings	Endowment (billions – FY25)	Nickname	Joined (Note: Represents the calendar year when fall sports competition begins.)	Colors
University of Arizona	Tucson, Arizona	1885	Public	54,384	$67,420	$1.501	Wildcats	2024	
Arizona State University	Tempe, Arizona (Note: Tempe is the location of the main campus and university administration. ASU has three other physical campuses in the Phoenix area.)	1885	Public	78,489 (Note: Total on-campus enrollment is reported. Enrollment at the main Tempe campus is 57,144, and total enrollment including online students is 160,051.)	$66,968	$2.050	Sun Devils	2024	
Baylor University	Waco, Texas	1845	Private (Baptist)	19,858	$69,608	$2.180	Bears	1996	
Brigham Young University	Provo, Utah	1875	Private (LDS)	37,205	$77,018	$3.705	Cougars	2023	
University of Central Florida	Orlando, Florida (Note: The UCF campus has an Orlando mailing address but is entirely located in unincorporated Orange County, Florida)	1963	Public	70,674	$61,355	$0.266	Knights	2023	
University of Cincinnati	Cincinnati, Ohio	1819	Public	53,682	$72,188	$1.770	Bearcats	2023	
University of Colorado Boulder	Boulder, Colorado	1876	Public	38,808	$76,850	$2.471 (system-wide)	Buffaloes	1996; 2024 (Note: Colorado was a founding member of the Big 12 in 1996. In 2011, they left to join the Pac-12 Conference and rejoined the Big 12 as a full member in 2024)	
University of Houston	Houston, Texas	1927	Public	48,972	$68,091	$2.687 (system-wide)	Cougars	2023	
Iowa State University	Ames, Iowa	1858	Public	31,105	$68,277	$1.914	Cyclones	1996	
University of Kansas	Lawrence, Kansas	1865	Public	31,169	$69,680	$2.867	Jayhawks	1996	
Kansas State University	Manhattan, Kansas	1863	Public	21,213	$64,711	$0.902	Wildcats	1996	
Oklahoma State University	Stillwater, Oklahoma	1890	Public	27,839	$65,492	$1.564 (system-wide)	Cowboys & Cowgirls	1996	
Texas Christian University	Fort Worth, Texas	1873	Private (DOC)	12,980	$76,188	$2.854	Horned Frogs	2012	
Texas Tech University	Lubbock, Texas	1923	Public	42,455	$66,144	$3.069 (system-wide)	Red Raiders	1996	
University of Utah	Salt Lake City, Utah	1850	Public	38,261	$75,345	$2.071	Utes (Note: The women's gymnastics team is known as the Red Rocks.)	2024	
West Virginia University	Morgantown, West Virginia	1867	Public	26,046	$64,952	$0.889	Mountaineers	2012	

=== Membership map ===
Big 12 Conference Full Members
Location of Big 12 Full members:
Big 12 Conference Affiliate Members
Location of Big 12 Affiliate members:
1 Missouri (Wrestling)
2 Northern Iowa (Wrestling)
3 Oklahoma (Wrestling)
4 Utah Valley (Wrestling)
5 Wyoming (Wrestling)
6 Denver (Gymnastics)
7 Fresno State (Equestrian)
8 Florida (Lacrosse)
9 San Diego State (Lacrosse)
10 UC Davis (Lacrosse)
11 Old Dominion (Rowing)
12 Tulsa (Rowing)
13 Boise State (Beach Volleyball)
14 Florida State (Beach Volleyball)
15 South Carolina (Beach Volleyball)

=== Affiliate members ===
Institution	City	State	Founded	Type	Enrollment (fall 2025)	Nickname	Joined (Note: Reflects the calendar year in which the school joined, which for spring sports is the year before the first season of competition.)	Colors	Big 12 sport(s)	Primary conference
Boise State University	Boise	Idaho	1932	Public	28,519	Broncos	2025		Beach volleyball	Pac-12
University of Denver	Denver	Colorado	1864	Private	11,499	Pioneers	2015		Women's gymnastics	WCC
University of Florida	Gainesville	Florida	1853	Public	57,368	Gators	2024		Women's lacrosse	SEC
Florida State University	Tallahassee	Florida	1851	Public	46,184	Seminoles	2025		Beach volleyball	ACC
California State University, Fresno	Fresno	California	1911	Public	24,992	Bulldogs	2019		Equestrian	Pac-12
University of Missouri	Columbia	Missouri	1839	Public	31,300	Tigers	2021 (Note: Missouri was a full Big 12 member from the conference's formation in 1996 until leaving for the SEC in 2012.)		Men's wrestling	SEC
University of Northern Iowa	Cedar Falls	Iowa	1876	Public	9,204	Panthers	2017		Men's wrestling	Missouri Valley
University of Oklahoma	Norman	Oklahoma	1890	Public	36,510	Sooners	2024 (Note: Oklahoma was a full Big 12 member from the conference's formation in 1996 until leaving for the SEC in 2024.)		Men's wrestling	SEC
Old Dominion University	Norfolk	Virginia	1930	Public	24,934	Monarchs	2024 (Note: Old Dominion was previously a women's rowing affiliate of the Big 12 from 2014 until 2018.)		Women's rowing	Sun Belt
San Diego State University	San Diego	California	1897	Public	41,184	Aztecs	2024		Women's lacrosse	Pac-12
University of South Carolina	Columbia	South Carolina	1801	Public	38,503	Gamecocks	2025		Beach volleyball	SEC
University of Tulsa	Tulsa	Oklahoma	1894	Private	4,149	Golden; Hurricane	2024		Women's rowing	American
University of California, Davis	Davis	California	1908	Public	40,617	Aggies	2024		Women's lacrosse	Mountain West
Utah Valley University	Orem	Utah	1941	Public	48,669	Wolverines	2015		Men's wrestling	Big West
University of Wyoming	Laramie	Wyoming	1886	Public	10,819	Cowboys	2015		Men's wrestling	Mountain West

Notes

- On July 29, 2015, the Big 12 announced it would add the six former members of the Western Wrestling Conference—Air Force, Northern Colorado, North Dakota State, South Dakota State, Utah Valley, and Wyoming—as affiliate members for men's wrestling, plus Denver as an affiliate member for women's gymnastics, all effective with the 2015–16 academic year.
- On July 5, 2017, the Big 12 added Fresno State and Northern Iowa as men's wrestling affiliates.
- On May 2, 2019, the Big 12 added Fresno State as an equestrian affiliate. Fresno State would drop wrestling in 2021, but remains an equestrian affiliate.
- In 2021, the Big 12 added former full member Missouri as a men's wrestling affiliate.
- On January 2, 2026, California Baptist announced that it would drop men's wrestling at the end of the 2025–26 season.
- The Pac-12 Conference, rebuilding after having lost 10 of its previous 12 full members in 2024, announced on April 1, 2026 that four men's wrestling programs that had previously competed as Big 12 affiliates—Air Force, North Dakota State, Northern Colorado, and South Dakota State—would become Pac-12 affiliates effective that July 1.

=== Former full members ===
Institution	City	State	Founded	Type	Nickname	Joined (Note: Represents the calendar year when fall sports competition begins.)	Left (Note: Represents the calendar year when spring sports competition ends.)	Colors	Current conference
University of Missouri	Columbia	Missouri	1839	Public	Tigers	1996	2012 (Note: Missouri returned to the Big 12 as a wrestling-only member, beginning the 2021–22 school year.)		SEC
University of Nebraska–Lincoln	Lincoln	Nebraska	1869	Public	Cornhuskers	1996	2011		Big Ten
University of Oklahoma	Norman	Oklahoma	1890	Public	Sooners	1996	2024 (Note: Oklahoma remained in the Big 12 as a wrestling-only member after otherwise joining the Southeastern Conference.)		SEC
University of Texas at Austin	Austin	Texas	1883	Public	Longhorns	1996	2024		SEC
Texas A&M University	College Station	Texas	1876	Public	Aggies	1996	2012		SEC

=== Former affiliate members ===
Institution	City	State	Founded	Type	Nickname	Joined (Note: Represents the calendar year when fall sports competition begins.)	Left (Note: Represents the calendar year when spring sports competition ends.)	Colors	Big 12 sport(s)	Current primary conference	Current conference in former Big 12 sport(s) (Note: Affiliation in former Big 12 sport(s); does not necessarily match primary affiliation.)
United States Air Force Academy (Air Force)	USAF Academy (Note: Virtually all of the Air Force Academy grounds, including the cadet area and all athletic facilities, are outside the city limits of Colorado Springs. The US Postal Service considers the Academy to be its own entity, and the US Census Bureau considers it to be the census-designated place of Air Force Academy, Colorado.)	Colorado	1954	Military	Falcons	2015	2026		Men's wrestling	Mountain West	Pac-12
University of Alabama	Tuscaloosa	Alabama	1831	Public	Crimson Tide	2014	2024		Women's rowing	SEC	
California Baptist University	Riverside	California	1950	Private	Lancers	2022	2026		Men's wrestling	Big West	N/A (Note: California Baptist dropped men's wrestling after the 2025–26 school year.)
California State University, Fresno (Fresno State)	Fresno	California	1911	Public	Bulldogs	2017	2021 (Note: Fresno State remains in the Big 12 as an affiliate member in equestrian.)		Men's wrestling	Pac-12	N/A (Note: Fresno State dropped men's wrestling during the 2020–21 school year due to COVID budget cuts.)
North Dakota State University	Fargo	North Dakota	1890	Public	Bison	2015	2026		Men's wrestling	Summit	Pac-12
University of Northern Colorado	Greeley	Colorado	1889	Public	Bears	2015	2026		Men's wrestling	Big Sky	Pac-12
South Dakota State University	Brookings	South Dakota	1881	Public	Jackrabbits	2015	2026		Men's wrestling	Summit	Pac-12
University of Tennessee	Knoxville	Tennessee	1794	Public	Volunteers	2014	2024		Women's rowing	SEC	

=== Membership timeline ===
Full members
Other Conference
Other Conference
Affiliate member (other sport)
Founding members from Big Eight Conference
Founding members from Southwest Conference
Subsequent members from Southwest Conference
Pac-12 Conference

==== Earlier membership timelines ====
Founding members of the Big 12 from the Big Eight:

- Colorado
- Iowa State
- Kansas
- Kansas State
- Missouri
- Nebraska
- Oklahoma
- Oklahoma State

Founding members of the Big 12 from the Southwest Conference:

- Baylor
- Texas
- Texas A&M
- Texas Tech

Current members with the longest continuous association with the Big Eight Conference / Southwest Conference / Big 12 Conference.

Institution	Started Current Association In	Continuous Years	Note
Kansas	1907	120	
Iowa State	1908	119	
Kansas State	1913	114	
Baylor	1915	112	
Texas Tech	1956	71	
Oklahoma State	1958	69	Previously: 10 years in the Southwest Conference (1914–1924); 3 years in the MVIAA (1924–1927)
TCU	2012	15	Previously: 73 years in the Southwest Conference (1923–1996)
West Virginia	2012	15	
BYU	2023	4	
UCF	2023	4	
Cincinnati	2023	4	
Houston	2023	4	Previously: 20 years in the Southwest Conference (1976–1996)
Arizona	2024	3	
Arizona State	2024	3	
Utah	2024	3	
Colorado	2024	3	Previously: 49 years in the Big Eight Conference (1947–1996) and 15 years in the Big 12 Conference (1996–2011)

== Sports ==
The Big 12 Conference sponsors championship competition in 10 men's and 15 women's NCAA sanctioned sports.

Teams in Big 12 Conference competition
Sport	Men's	Women's
Baseball	14	–
Basketball	16	16
Beach volleyball	–	6
Cross country	13	16
Equestrian	–	4
Football	16	–
Golf	16	14
Gymnastics	–	7
Lacrosse	–	6
Rowing	–	6
Soccer	–	16
Softball	–	11
Swimming & Diving	7	10
Tennis	9	16
Track and Field (Indoor)	13	16
Track and Field (Outdoor)	13	16
Volleyball	–	15
Wrestling	14	–

=== Current champions ===
Season	Sport	Men's champion	Women's champion
Fall 2026	Cross Country	Colorado	BYU
Fall 2026	Football		–
Fall 2026	Soccer	–	BYU
Fall 2026	Volleyball	–	BYU
Winter 2026–27	Basketball		
Winter 2026–27	Equestrian	–	
Winter 2026–27	Gymnastics	–	
Winter 2026–27	Indoor Track & Field		
Winter 2026–27	Swimming & Diving		
Winter 2026–27	Wrestling		–
Spring 2027	Baseball		–
Spring 2027	Beach Volleyball	–	
Spring 2027	Lacrosse	–	
Spring 2027	Golf		
Spring 2027	Outdoor Track & Field		
Spring 2027	Rowing	–	
Spring 2027	Softball	–	
Spring 2027	Tennis		

=== Men's sponsored sports by university ===
Below are the men's sports sponsored by each member institution.

The only men's sports with full participation by the entire conference are basketball, football, and golf. Swimming and diving has the lowest participation with only seven universities fielding a team.

Before 2026–27, the Big 12 had 14 men's wrestling members, but five of those teams left in July 2026. Before the conference's 2023 expansion, that sport had the most competing schools of any Big 12 sport, with 13 members at that time. The 2022–23 and 2024–25 wrestling lineups both included only 4 full conference members; all remaining wrestling schools were affiliate members (listed as a footnote at the bottom of the table).

University	Baseball	Basketball	Cross Country	Football	Golf	Swimming & Diving	Tennis	Track & Field Indoor	Track & Field Outdoor	Wrestling	Total Big 12 Sports
Arizona	Yes	Yes	Yes	Yes	Yes	Yes	Yes	Yes	Yes	No	9
Arizona State	Yes	Yes	Yes	Yes	Yes	Yes	Yes	Yes	Yes	Yes	10
Baylor	Yes	Yes	Yes	Yes	Yes	No	Yes	Yes	Yes	No	8
BYU	Yes	Yes	Yes	Yes	Yes	Yes	Yes	Yes	Yes	No	9
Cincinnati	Yes	Yes	Yes	Yes	Yes	Yes	No	Yes	Yes	No	8
Colorado	No	Yes	Yes	Yes	Yes	No	No	Yes	Yes	No	6
Houston	Yes	Yes	Yes	Yes	Yes	No	No	Yes	Yes	No	7
Iowa State	No	Yes	Yes	Yes	Yes	No	No	Yes	Yes	Yes	7
Kansas	Yes	Yes	Yes	Yes	Yes	No	No	Yes	Yes	No	7
Kansas State	Yes	Yes	Yes	Yes	Yes	No	No	Yes	Yes	No	7
Oklahoma State	Yes	Yes	Yes	Yes	Yes	No	Yes	Yes	Yes	Yes	9
TCU	Yes	Yes	Yes	Yes	Yes	Yes	Yes	Yes	Yes	No	9
Texas Tech	Yes	Yes	Yes	Yes	Yes	No	Yes	Yes	Yes	No	8
UCF	Yes	Yes	No	Yes	Yes	No	Yes	No	No	No	5
Utah	Yes	Yes	No	Yes	Yes	Yes	Yes	No	No	No	6
West Virginia	Yes	Yes	No	Yes	Yes	Yes	No	No	No	Yes	6
Current totals	14	16	13	16	16	7	9	13	13	4+5 (Note: Affiliate members Missouri, Northern Iowa, Oklahoma, Utah Valley, and Wyoming.)	

Men's (and Coed – see Rifle) varsity sports not sponsored by the Big 12 Conference which are played by Big 12 universities:

Schools Participating in Men's Non-Sponsored Sports
University	Ice Hockey	Lacrosse	Rifle (Note: Rifle is often categorized as a men's sport because the NCAA bylaws that establish scholarship limits for each sport list rifle as a men's sport. Nonetheless, it is an open coed sport in NCAA college athletics, with men's, women's, and coed teams in all NCAA divisions competing against each other. TCU and West Virginia both field coed teams. Through 2017, West Virginia with 19 national titles and TCU with two, together have won over half of the NCAA titles awarded since the inaugural NCAA championship in 1980. West Virginia also won four pre-NCAA national titles.)	Skiing	Soccer	Volleyball
Arizona State	NCHC	No	No	No	No	No
BYU	No	No	No	No	No	MPSF
Colorado	No	No	No	RMISA	No	No
TCU	No	No	PRC	No	No	No
UCF	No	No	No	No	SBC	No
Utah	No	ASUN	No	RMISA	No	No
West Virginia	No	No	GARC	No	SBC	No

=== Women's sponsored sports by university ===
Below are the women's sports sponsored by each member institution.

The women's sports with full participation are basketball, cross country, soccer, tennis, indoor track and outdoor track. Oklahoma State is the only member of the Big 12, or of any power conference, that does not sponsor volleyball. Only Utah and West Virginia do not sponsor golf.

Equestrian (3 full members, 1 affiliate) has the lowest participation, with 4 total members. Beach volleyball (3 full members, 3 affiliates), lacrosse (3 full members, 3 affiliates) and rowing (4 full members, 2 affiliates) follow with 6 total members. The affiliate members are listed as footnotes at the bottom of the table, beneath their respective sport.

Full Members
University	Basketball	Beach Volleyball	Cross Country	Equestrian	Golf	Gymnastics	Lacrosse	Rowing	Soccer	Softball	Swimming & Diving	Tennis	Track & Field Indoor	Track & Field Outdoor	Volleyball	Total Big 12 Sports
Arizona	Yes	Yes	Yes	No	Yes	Yes	No	No	Yes	Yes	Yes	Yes	Yes	Yes	Yes	11
Arizona State	Yes	Yes	Yes	No	Yes	Yes	Yes	No	Yes	Yes	Yes	Yes	Yes	Yes	Yes	13
Baylor	Yes	No	Yes	Yes	Yes	No	No	No	Yes	Yes	No	Yes	Yes	Yes	Yes	10
BYU	Yes	No	Yes	No	Yes	Yes	No	No	Yes	Yes	Yes	Yes	Yes	Yes	Yes	11
Cincinnati	Yes	No	Yes	No	Yes	No	Yes	No	Yes	No	Yes	Yes	Yes	Yes	Yes	10
Colorado	Yes	No	Yes	No	Yes	No	Yes	No	Yes	No	No	Yes	Yes	Yes	Yes	10
Houston	Yes	No	Yes	No	Yes	No	No	No	Yes	Yes	Yes	Yes	Yes	Yes	Yes	10
Iowa State	Yes	No	Yes	No	Yes	No	No	No	Yes	Yes	Yes	Yes	Yes	Yes	Yes	10
Kansas	Yes	No	Yes	No	Yes	No	No	Yes	Yes	Yes	Yes	Yes	Yes	Yes	Yes	11
Kansas State	Yes	No	Yes	No	Yes	No	No	Yes	Yes	No	No	Yes	Yes	Yes	Yes	9
Oklahoma State	Yes	No	Yes	Yes	Yes	No	No	No	Yes	Yes	No	Yes	Yes	Yes	No	9
TCU	Yes	Yes	Yes	Yes	Yes	No	No	No	Yes	No	Yes	Yes	Yes	Yes	Yes	11
Texas Tech	Yes	No	Yes	No	Yes	No	No	No	Yes	Yes	No	Yes	Yes	Yes	Yes	9
UCF	Yes	No	Yes	No	Yes	No	No	Yes	Yes	Yes	No	Yes	Yes	Yes	Yes	10
Utah	Yes	No	Yes	No	No	Yes	No	No	Yes	Yes	Yes	Yes	Yes	Yes	Yes	10
West Virginia	Yes	No	Yes	No	No	Yes	No	Yes	Yes	No	Yes	Yes	Yes	Yes	Yes	10
Current totals	16	3+3 (Note: Affiliate members Boise State, Florida State, and South Carolina.)	16	3+1 (Note: Affiliate member Fresno State.)	14	5+1 (Note: Affiliate member Denver.)	3+3 (Note: Affiliate members Florida, San Diego State, and UC Davis.)	4+2 (Note: Affiliate members Old Dominion and Tulsa.)	16	11	10	16	16	16	15	

Women's (and co-educational – see Rifle) varsity sports not sponsored by the Big 12 Conference which are played by Big 12 universities:

Schools Participating in Women's Non-Sponsored Sports
University	Acrobatics & tumbling (Note: Graduated from the NCAA Emerging Sports for Women program to full championship status in January 2026, with the first official championship to be held in 2026–27.)	Rifle (Note: Rifle is often categorized as a men's sport because the NCAA bylaws that establish scholarship limits for each sport list rifle as a men's sport. Nonetheless, it is an open coed sport in NCAA college athletics, with men's, women's, and coed teams in all NCAA divisions competing against each other. TCU and West Virginia both field coed teams. Through 2018, West Virginia with 19 national titles and TCU with two, together have won over half of the NCAA titles awarded since the inaugural NCAA championship in 1980. West Virginia also won four pre-NCAA national titles.)	Skiing	Triathlon (Note: Part of the NCAA Emerging Sports for Women program.)	Water Polo	Wrestling
Arizona	No	No	No	Yes	No	No
Arizona State	No	No	No	Yes	MPSF	No
Baylor	NCATA	No	No	No	No	No
Colorado	No	No	RMISA	No	No	No
Iowa State	No	No	No	No	No	No (Note: Iowa State will add women's wrestling in 2027–28.)
TCU	No	PRC	No	Yes	No	No
Utah	No	No	RMISA	No	No	No
West Virginia	No	GARC	No	No	No	No

- In addition to the above, UCF lists its coeducational cheerleading and all-female dance teams as varsity teams on its official athletic website.

== History ==
The Big 12 Conference was founded in February 1994. All eight members of the former Big Eight Conference joined with half the members of the former Southwest Conference (Texas, Texas A&M, Baylor and Texas Tech) to form the conference, with play beginning in 1996.

The Big 12 does not claim the Big Eight's history as its own, even though it was essentially the Big Eight plus four of the Texas universities.

The Big 12 began athletic play in fall 1996, with the Texas Tech vs. Kansas State football game being the first-ever sports event staged by the conference.

From its formation until 2011, its 12 members competed in two divisions in most sports. The two Oklahoma universities and the four Texas universities formed the South Division, while the other six universities of the former Big Eight formed the North Division.

Between 2011 and 2012 four charter members left the conference:

- Colorado
- Missouri
- Nebraska
- Texas A&M

In 2012, two universities joined the conference:

- TCU
- West Virginia

On July 26, 2021, Oklahoma and Texas notified the Big 12 Conference that the two universities did not wish to extend their grant of television rights beyond the 2024–25 athletic year. On July 27, 2021, Oklahoma and Texas sent a joint letter to the Southeastern Conference requesting an invitation for membership beginning July 1, 2025. On July 29, 2021, the 14 presidents and chancellors of SEC member universities voted unanimously to invite Oklahoma and Texas to join the SEC. The following day, the Texas Board of Regents and Oklahoma Board of Regents each accepted the invitation to join the SEC from July 1, 2025.

On September 10, 2021, the Big 12 announced that invitations had been extended to and accepted by BYU (a football independent and member of the non-football West Coast Conference) and three members of the American Athletic Conference in Cincinnati, UCF, and Houston. These moves, combined with the impending departure of Oklahoma and Texas, would once again increase the Big 12's membership to twelve schools. All four schools began competing in Big 12 athletics beginning in summer of 2023. BYU had initially announced that it would join in 2023, and Houston indicated it could do so as well. On June 10, 2022, The American and its three departing members announced a buyout agreement that allowed those schools to join the Big 12 in 2023.

On February 9, 2023, Oklahoma and Texas announced they had reached a settlement with the conference that allowed them to join the SEC on July 1, 2024.

On July 27, 2023, Colorado, a former member of the Big 12, announced it would rejoin the conference from the Pac-12 beginning in the 2024–25 academic year. The following week, Arizona, Arizona State, and Utah announced they would leave the Pac-12 for the Big 12, also effective for the 2024–25 academic year.

== Academics ==
All Big 12 members are doctorate-granting universities. All members except TCU are classified by the American Council on Education (ACE) as "R1: Doctoral Universities – Very high research spending and doctorate production". TCU is in ACE's second-tier classification of "R2: Doctoral Universities – High research spending and doctorate production".

Undergraduate campus diversity (Fall 2024)
Campus	Asian	Black	Hispanic	International	Two or more races	Unknown	White	Low-income
Arizona	5%	4%	28%	4%	5%	6%	46%	28%
Arizona State	9%	4%	27%	8%	5%	4%	41%	32%
Baylor	9%	5%	18%	3%	5%	1%	60%	15%
BYU	2%	0%	8%	3%	4%	2%	81%	34%
Cincinnati	5%	9%	5%	5%	5%	1%	69%	23%
Colorado	6%	2%	14%	3%	7%	1%	67%	16%
Houston	23%	12%	38%	5%	3%	1%	16%	45%
Iowa State	4%	2%	7%	4%	3%	4%	75%	21%
Kansas	6%	4%	11%	3%	6%	1%	69%	23%
Kansas State	2%	3%	10%	2%	4%	1%	79%	23%
Oklahoma State	2%	4%	10%	1%	11%	0%	66%	31%
TCU	3%	4%	19%	4%	4%	3%	62%	17%
Texas Tech	3%	6%	30%	2%	4%	1%	52%	30%
UCF	8%	9%	32%	3%	5%	1%	43%	35%
Utah	6%	1%	14%	5%	6%	3%	64%	21%
West Virginia	2%	3%	5%	1%	6%	2%	82%	25%

Undergraduate student success outcomes (Fall 2024)
Campus	Retention rate (Note: The percentage of full-time students who return to this college after completing their freshman year.)	Graduation rate (Note: The percentage of students who graduate within 8 years of starting at this college.)	Net price (Note: The average yearly cost to attend this college for students from a family income of $0K to $30K, minus any grants and scholarships the student receives. For public colleges, this is the cost for in-state students.)	Federal loan rate (Note: The percentage of undergraduate students who borrowed federal loans to help pay for college.)	Median debt (Note: The median federal loan debt of graduates of this college. This includes only federal loans taken out at this college, and excludes private student loans, Parent PLUS loans, and federal loans taken out at other colleges.)	Median earnings (Note: The median yearly incomes of former students who received federal aid 4 years after graduating from the college.)
Arizona	85%	62%	$14,327	27%	$18,000	$67,420
Arizona State	86%	68%	$9,413	27%	$19,151	$66,968
Baylor	91%	80%	$45,498	31%	$19,500	$69,608
BYU	90%	86%	$9,893	10%	$12,250	$77,018
Cincinnati	86%	73%	$16,848	42%	$20,500	$72,188
Colorado	90%	74%	$13,403	26%	$18,500	$76,850
Houston	87%	65%	$8,468	32%	$17,250	$68,091
Iowa State	88%	74%	$11,957	44%	$21,250	$68,277
Kansas	86%	68%	$15,379	39%	$20,000	$69,680
Kansas State	86%	67%	$12,650	38%	$19,200	$64,711
Oklahoma State	84%	64%	$12,518	39%	$19,500	$65,492
TCU	94%	82%	$22,363	25%	$21,500	$76,188
Texas Tech	85%	68%	$15,008	42%	$19,500	$66,144
UCF	92%	73%	$7,870	22%	$17,065	$61,355
Utah	86%	68%	$24,961	21%	$16,878	$75,345
West Virginia	82%	63%	$15,015	47%	$21,146	$64,952

== Distinctive elements ==
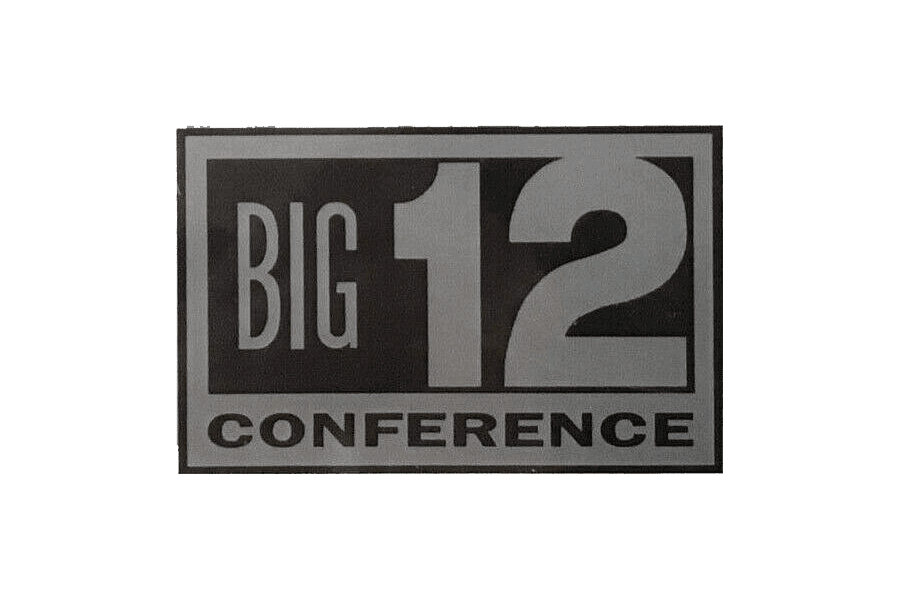
Prototype Big 12 logo, based on the logo of the Big Eight Conference

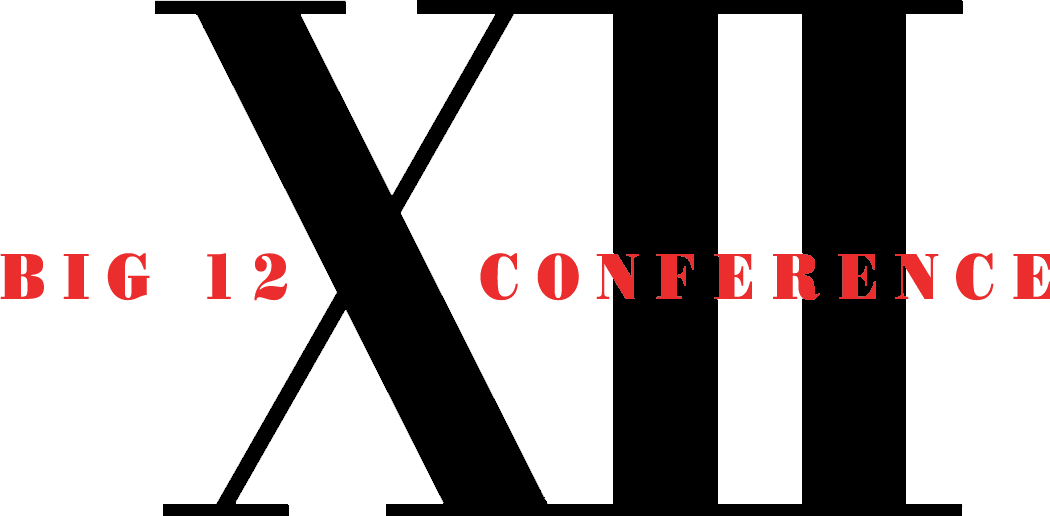
First official Big 12 Conference logo from 1996 to 2004

Second official Big 12 Conference logo from 2004 to 2014

=== Population base and markets ===
The largest media markets represented by the Big 12 are, ranked nationally:

- Dallas-Fort Worth (5th)
- Houston (6th)
- Phoenix (11th)
- Orlando (16th)
- Denver (17th)
- Salt Lake City (27th)
- San Antonio (31st)
- Kansas City (34th)
- Cincinnati (37th)
- Oklahoma City (47th)
- Tulsa (62nd)
- Tucson (65th)
- Des Moines (67th)
- Wichita (72nd)

Although West Virginia University is based out of Morgantown, West Virginia (officially part of the Pittsburgh (26th) media market), the TV market encompasses the majority of West Virginia's TV viewership and also reaches well into Western Pennsylvania.

Kansas State University is in Manhattan, Kansas, which is part of the Topeka, Kansas media market, but it is close to the Wichita market, which encompasses two-thirds of the state (stretching to the border with Colorado), including the cities of Dodge City, Garden City, Hutchinson and Salina.

While the University of Kansas is in Lawrence, Kansas, it is officially part of the Kansas City television market, increasing the base into western Missouri.

State	Population	Universities
Arizona	7,623,818	* University of Arizona * Arizona State University
Colorado	6,012,561	* University of Colorado Boulder
Florida	23,462,518	* University of Central Florida
Iowa	3,238,387	* Iowa State University
Kansas	2,977,220	* University of Kansas * Kansas State University
Ohio	11,900,510	* University of Cincinnati
Oklahoma	4,123,288	* Oklahoma State University
Texas	31,709,821	* Baylor University * University of Houston * Texas Christian University * Texas Tech University
Utah	3,538,904	* Brigham Young University * University of Utah
West Virginia	1,766,147	* West Virginia University
Total	96,353,174	

=== Grant of Rights ===
Member universities granted their first and second tier sports media rights to the conference for the length of their current TV deals. The Grant of Rights (GOR) deal with the leagues' TV contracts ensures that "if a Big 12 school leaves for another league in the next 13 years, that school's media rights, including revenue, would remain with the Big 12 and not its new conference".

GOR is seen by league members as a "foundation of stability" and allowed the Big 12 to be "positioned with one of the best media rights arrangements in collegiate sports, providing the conference and its members unprecedented revenue growth, and sports programming over two networks." All members agreed to the GOR and later agreed to extend the initial 6-year deal to 13 years to correspond to the length of their TV contracts.

Prior to this agreement, the Big Ten and Pac-12 also had similar GOR agreements. The Big 12 subsequently assisted the ACC in drafting its GOR agreement. Three of the four major conferences now have such agreements, with the SEC the only exception.

=== Tier 3 events ===
Historically, the Big 12 allowed members to monetize TV rights for everything not broadcast on national or regional TV channels (tier 3 rights). Currently, the conference's tier 3 broadcast rights are bundled as part of the television deal extension starting in the 2025–26 school year, with all of the Big 12's tier 3 rights held by ESPN. As such, schools no longer need to find their own broadcast partners for these events; they are all handled by ESPN. These events are primarily broadcast on Big 12 Now/ESPN+, but are also broadcast on other ESPN channels as determined by ESPN.

=== Business partnerships and innovation ===
The Big 12 has a sponsorship rights partnership with Learfield IMG College. The Big 12 announced on September 9, 2022, that it appointed WME Sports and IMG Media, Endeavor companies, to facilitate its global content and commercial strategy. Commissioner Brett Yormark stated "We have aligned with a best-in-class team to build a best-in-class business strategy for the Conference". November 14, 2022 Big 12 formed a comprehensive business advisor board composed of over three dozen entrepreneurial icons and respective industry leaders. From the likes of Monte Lipman the Founder/CEO Republic Records, Steve Stoute Founder/CEO UnitedMasters & Translation, Mark Shapiro President of Endeavor, Gary Vaynerchuk's VaynerMedia, singer Garth Brooks, NBA legend Jason Kidd, Keith Sheldon President of Entertainment for Hard Rock Cafe International, and Ross Levinsohn Chairman and CEO - The Arena Group & Sports Illustrated.

The Big 12 partnered with creative agency Translation to help build a more contemporary audience and brand. Soon after Big 12 Conference made a deal with A Bathing Ape (BAPE) for Championship games. The Conference and BAPE worked together to create limited-edition clothing and a camouflaged Big 12 logo throughout the stadium, arena, and uniforms.

The Big 12 has 11 official corporate partners: Allstate, Children's Health, Dr Pepper, Gatorade, Grand Caliber, Old Trapper, On Location, Phillips 66, Sonic Hard Seltzer, Sprouts Farmers Market, and Tickets For Less. There are dozens of other companies engaged as sponsors of the conference.

==== Conference Pro Day ====
On March 15, 2023, before the NFL draft, the Big 12 announced the first of its kind across all college conferences, being a conference-wide Pro Day. Instead of schools hosting separate pro days for their football players, there was only one conference-wide scouting event before the 2024 NFL draft. The event was held at the Dallas Cowboys training complex, Ford Center at The Star. Essentially a conference version of the NFL Combine, the Pro Day was televised on NFL Network.

==== Hoops in the Park ====
In March 2023, the Big 12 Conference announced a partnership with Rucker Park for a community engagement event. In June the event was officially announced as "Big 12 Hoops in the Park", to host men's and women's summer exhibition games. Throughout the event, the Big 12 also prepared a number of entertainment activities and community engagements. The activities included youth clinics, meet-and-greets, live music, and food.

==== Mexico ====
Early June 2023, the "Big 12 Mexico" initiative was announced, which includes men's and women's soccer, baseball, basketball, and football games and an international media rights strategy. In July 2024, the Big 12 announced that it would narrow its focus in Mexico to looking at games for baseball and women's soccer.

==== Monster Energy ====
In July 2026, the Big 12 announced a multi-year partnership with Monster Energy, designating the company as the entitlement partner of Big 12 Football and Big 12 Basketball regular seasons. Under the agreement, valued at approximately $20 million annually (about $1 million per member school), a co-branded Monster Energy and Big 12 logo appears on football and men's and women's basketball jerseys as well as on fields and courts across the conference. The regular seasons are branded as "Monster Energy Big 12 Football" and "Monster Energy Big 12 Basketball," with additional digital and social media integration. The deal builds on an earlier partnership that made Monster the conference's official energy drink.

The agreement drew scrutiny from fans, industry observers, and some sources describing the valuation as very low relative to the breadth of assets involved and comparing it unfavorably to individual school jersey-patch deals that later emerged in the market. Front Office Sports source called it "objectively a terrible deal," arguing that Big 12 schools were worth substantially more than the per-school payout for the conference-wide package of patches, surface logos, and naming rights.

== Financials ==
=== Conference annual revenue distribution history ===
The following table lists the amount of revenue that the Big 12 conference distributed in each of these years.

Athletic Year Starting In	Total distributed	Annual increase	Average per university^{a}
1997	$53.6 million	–	$4.5 million
1998	$58 million	8.2%	$4.8 million
1999	$64 million	10.3%	$5.3 million
2000	$72 million	12.5%	$6.0 million
2001	$78 million	8.3%	$6.5 million
2002	$83.5 million	7.1%	$7.0 million
2003	$89 million	6.6%	$7.4 million
2004	$101 million	13.5%	$8.4 million
2005	$105.6 million	4.6%	$8.8 million
2006	$103.1 million	−2.4%	$8.6 million
2007	$106 million	2.8%	$8.8 million
2008	$113.5 million	7.1%	$9.5 million
2009	$130 million	14.5%	$10.8 million
2010	$139 million	6.9%	$11.6 million
2011	$145 million	4.3%	$12.1 million
2012	$187 million	29.0%	$18.7 million
2013	$198 million	5.9%	$19.8 million
2014	$212 million	7.1%	$21.2 million
2015	$252 million	18.9%	$25.2 million
2016	$304 million	20.6%	$30.4 million
2017	$348 million	14.5%	$34.8 million
2018	$364 million	4.9%	$36.5 million
2019	$388 million	6.3%	$38.8 million
2020	$377 million	-2.8%	$37.7 million
2021	$345 million	-8.5%	$34.5 million
2022	$426 million	23.5%	$42.6 million
2023	$470 million	10.3%	$39.8 million $18.0 million
2024	$558 million	18.7%	$40.2 million $19.0 million
2025	$611 million	9.5%	$39.5 million $20.8 million
2026	$710 million	16.2%	$40 million (est.)
^{a} Individual universities' disbursements vary annually according to bylaw rules and entrance or withdrawal agreements. Twelve Big 12 members received disbursements each year from 1997 to 2011, then ten each year through 2022. For 2023-25, BYU, UC, UCF & UH each received half-shares as a baseline. In 2024-25, there were 12 full-share members. Starting in 2026, all 16 members receive full shares as a baseline.

Conference revenue comes from media rights contracts, bowl games, the NCAA, merchandise, licensing, and conference-hosted sporting events.

Most of the Big 12's revenue comes from its media rights contracts. In 2012, the Big 12 announced a media rights agreement with Fox and ESPN, replacing an ABC/ESPN deal, estimated to be worth $2.6 billion through the 2025 expiration. The two deals pushed the conference per-university payout to approximately $20 million per year, while separating third-tier media rights into separate deals for each university; such contracts secured an additional $6 million to $20 million per university annually. In 2022, the conference renewed its media rights with ESPN and Fox Sports for six seasons starting in 2025–26, with an estimated US$380 million average annual fee, equating to about $31.7 million per school. The contract included a pro-rata clause that increased the conference's fee proportionately if Power conference schools were added. Subsequently, with the additions of Arizona, Arizona St, Colorado, and Utah, the value of the contract is set to increase by about $125 million per year from $380 million to $505 million.

Significant additional revenue is generated from postseason play by Big 12 teams, including the college football playoff, football bowl games, and NCAA basketball tournament revenue. For the 2023-24 football season, the Big 12 received $79.4 million for participating in the college football playoff. Bowl game revenues vary yearly with team selections; the 2024 Alamo Bowl between BYU, representing the Big 12, and Colorado, who took a Pac-12's spot, paid the conference $9.8 million. Considered perhaps the best basketball conference in the country, the Big 12 performs well in the NCAA basketball tournament. Conference teams earned 15 units (worth $30 million) in the 2024 tournament, and 20 units (worth $40 million) in the 2025 tournament.

In the era of Name-Image-Likeness (NIL) payments to student-athletes and revenue sharing directly from school athletic department budgets, the Big 12 has also maximized creative sponsorships. In July 2025, the conference announced a sponsorship deal with PayPal worth about $100 million over 3 years, roughly $2 million per school per year. Under the agreement, PayPal and Venmo will be the official partner of the Big 12 Conference for payments to student athletes and will be promoted across Big 12 football, basketball, and Olympic sports championships for both men and women. Phillips 66 is the title sponsor for Big 12 championship events, and has been for most of the conference's existence, though the contract amount has not been publicly disclosed.

Once the Big 12's new media rights deal kicks in, conference annual distributions to each school are expected to be $50 million or more. All conference members will receive a full share of revenue from the conference's media rights contracts, though payments to individual schools could differ based on postseason play.

=== Source of Conference Revenue ===
The following table shows the source of the revenue for the Big 12 conference during the fiscal year beginning 07-01-2024 ending 06-30-2025 as reported by ProPublica using Part VIII of the Big 12 Conference tax filing submitted on May 14, 2026.

Source of Revenue	2024–25 Total Revenue	2024–25 Average Revenue Per Member
Television Contracts	$336,595,717	$21,037,232
Bowl Games	$192,148,229	$12,009,264
NCAA Revenue	$45,607,505	$2,850,469
Ticket Sales	$17,087,461	$1,067,966
Other Program Service	$3,184,177	$199,011
Investment Income	$2,562,897	$160,181
Royalties	$1,633,460	$102,091
Other Revenue	$11,827,732	$739,233
Total	$610,904,862	$38,181,554

=== Conference distributions ===
The following table shows Big 12 Conference distributions during the fiscal year beginning 07-01-2024 ending 06-30-2025 as reported by ProPublica using Schedule A of the Big 12 Conference tax filing submitted on May 14, 2026.

Institution	2024–25 Distribution
Arizona State University	$43,009,550
Iowa State University	$41,194,426
Baylor University	$39,950,085
Kansas State University	$39,830,544
Texas Tech University	$39,734,106
West Virginia University	$39,582,600
Texas Christian University	$39,272,007
University of Colorado	$39,034,422
University of Kansas	$38,312,680
Oklahoma State University	$38,038,756
University of Arizona	$38,009,311
University of Utah	$37,879,865
Brigham Young University	$23,110,622
University of Cincinnati	$20,211,539
University of Central Florida	$19,978,520
University of Houston	$19,881,951
Average for 12 Full Share Members Average for 4 Half Share Members	$39,487,363 $20,795,658

=== CNBC list of the most valuable Big 12 schools ===
Rankings as of December 19, 2025 (2024–2025 academic year)

Big 12	NCAA	School	Valuation	Value Change	Revenue	Revenue Change
1	39	Kansas Jayhawks	$620 million	▲12%	$135 million	▲5%
2	41	Oklahoma State Cowboys	$600 million	▲20%	$135 million	▲11%
3	42	Baylor Bears	$585 million	▲14%	$148 million	▲8%
4	46	Iowa State Cyclones	$575 million	▲17%	$122 million	▲5%
5	47	Colorado Buffaloes	$574 million	▲22%	$147 million	▲16%
6	49	Texas Tech Red Raiders	$570 million	▼8%	$127 million	▼14%
7	50	TCU Horned Frogs	$568 million	▲5%	$142 million	▼5%
8	55	Arizona Wildcats	$529 million	▼1%	$134 million	▼6%
9	57	BYU Cougars	$500 million	▲40%	$130 million	▲23%
10	58	West Virginia Mountaineers	$481 million	▲19%	$108 million	▲2%
11	60	Utah Utes	$451 million	▼4%	$110 million	▼13%
12	62	Kansas State Wildcats	$435 million	▼2%	$104 million	▲2%
13	63	Arizona State Sun Devils	$430 million	▲54%	$104 million	▲2%
14	68	Cincinnati Bearcats	$280 million	▲30%	$97 million	▲11%
15	70	UCF Knights	$262 million	▲45%	$98 million	▲15%
16	73	Houston Cougars	$222 million	New entry	$88 million	New entry

=== Athletic department revenue by school ===
Total revenue includes ticket sales, contributions and donations, rights and licensing, student fees, school funds and all other sources including TV income, camp income, concessions, and novelties.

Total expenses includes coach and staff salaries, scholarships, buildings and grounds, maintenance, utilities and rental fees, recruiting, team travel, equipment and uniforms, conference dues, and insurance.

The following table shows institutional reporting to the United States Department of Education as shown on the DOE Equity in Athletics website for the 2024–25 academic year.

Institution	2024–25 Grand Total Revenues	2024–25 Grand Total Expenses	2024–25 Total Expenses on Football	2024–25 Total Expenses on Men's Basketball	2024–25 Total Expenses on Women's Basketball	2024–25 Total Expenses on All Other Sports	2024–25 Total Expenses Not Allocated by Sport
University of Kansas	$173,669,277	$159,866,627	$34,516,494	$19,732,078	$5,492,126	$27,724,593	$72,401,336
University of Colorado Boulder	$161,671,803	$161,512,069	$42,805,019	$8,608,358	$5,177,230	$16,172,936	$88,748,526
Texas Christian University	$155,989,500	$155,989,500	$59,568,339	$15,620,468	$9,587,284	$40,966,785	$30,246,624
Oklahoma State University	$153,679,234	$153,679,234	$32,830,617	$11,530,565	$4,718,546	$30,182,085	$74,417,421
Brigham Young University	$153,351,328	$136,864,784	$44,561,032	$17,030,052	$5,082,856	$33,035,212	$37,155,632
Arizona State University	$149,346,605	$149,346,605	$50,352,139	$10,063,114	$6,733,622	$45,043,288	$37,154,440
Baylor University	$144,126,427	$144,126,427	$41,050,130	$18,424,983	$9,328,990	$37,188,454	$38,133,870
University of Arizona	$132,661,899	$132,661,899	$37,795,880	$22,635,363	$8,001,360	$32,813,877	$31,415,419
Texas Tech University	$128,777,718	$127,895,343	$39,745,662	$15,637,329	$7,100,215	$27,359,791	$38,052,346
University of Utah	$125,167,576	$123,001,261	$41,410,554	$8,954,515	$5,015,772	$27,757,060	$35,529,308
University of Cincinnati	$119,327,103	$119,327,103	$30,429,185	$12,321,038	$4,400,216	$16,309,469	$55,867,195
West Virginia University	$117,413,366	$117,413,366	$35,250,569	$10,222,908	$5,476,114	$14,477,610	$51,469,342
University of Central Florida	$108,885,086	$103,615,446	$38,695,138	$7,812,023	$4,195,677	$20,722,076	$32,190,532
Iowa State University	$103,899,204	$103,893,160	$32,337,385	$10,382,761	$5,282,818	$20,829,320	$35,060,876
Kansas State University	$102,982,919	$100,807,499	$27,087,822	$10,907,824	$4,912,372	$16,345,981	$41,553,500
University of Houston	$100,162,965	$100,162,965	$23,271,364	$14,577,598	$3,685,535	$15,194,885	$43,433,583

== Facilities ==
School	Football stadium	Capacity	Basketball arena	Capacity	Baseball stadium	Capacity	Softball Stadium	Capacity	Volleyball Stadium	Capacity
Arizona	Casino Del Sol Stadium	50,782	McKale Center at ALKEME Arena	14,688	Hi Corbett Field	9,500	Rita Hillenbrand Memorial Stadium	2,956	McKale Center at ALKEME Arena	14,688
Arizona State	Mountain America Stadium	53,599	Desert Financial Arena	14,198	Phoenix Municipal Stadium	8,775	Alberta B. Farrington Softball Stadium	1,535	Desert Financial Arena	14,198
Baylor	McLane Stadium	45,140	Foster Pavilion	7,500	Baylor Ballpark	5,000	Getterman Stadium	1,230	Ferrell Center	6,000
BYU	LaVell Edwards Stadium	62,073	Marriott Center	17,978	Larry H. Miller Field	2,204	Gail Miller Field	2,100	Smith Fieldhouse	5,000
Cincinnati	James Gable Nippert Memorial Stadium	38,193	Fifth Third Arena	12,012	UC Baseball Stadium	3,058	Non-softball university		Fifth Third Arena	12,012
Colorado	Folsom Field	50,183	CU Events Center	11,064	Non-baseball university		Non-softball university		CU Events Center	11,064
Houston	TDECU Stadium (Note: To be renamed Space City Financial Stadium in 2026.)	40,000	Fertitta Center	7,100	Darryl & Lori Schroeder Park	3,500	Cougar Softball Stadium	1,200	Fertitta Center	7,100
Iowa State	Jack Trice Stadium	61,500	James H. Hilton Coliseum	14,356	Non-baseball university (Note: Iowa State discontinued its participation in baseball as an NCAA-recognized activity following the 2001 season. It participates in club baseball as a member of the National Club Baseball Association. Games are played at Cap Timm Field, capacity 3,000.)		Cyclone Sports Complex	1,500	James H. Hilton Coliseum	14,356
Kansas	David Booth Kansas Memorial Stadium	32,000 (Note: Capacity for 2026 season during ongoing renovations. Final capacity upon project completion in 2027 will be 43,000.)	Allen Fieldhouse	15,300	Hoglund Ballpark	2,500	Arrocha Ballpark	1,100	Horejsi Family Volleyball Arena	2,265
Kansas State	Bill Snyder Family Football Stadium	50,000	Fred Bramlage Coliseum	11,000	Tointon Family Stadium	2,331	Non-softball university		Morgan Family Arena	3,100
Oklahoma State	Boone Pickens Stadium	52,168	Gallagher-Iba Arena	13,611	O'Brate Stadium	3,500 (Note: Permanent seated capacity; expandable to 8,000.)	Cowgirl Stadium	750		
TCU	Amon G. Carter Stadium	46,000	Ed & Rae Schollmaier Arena	6,700	Lupton Stadium	4,500	Non-softball university			
Texas Tech	Galaxy Stadium	60,229	United Supermarkets Arena	15,098	Dan Law Field at Rip Griffin Park	4,528	Rocky Johnson Field	1,181		
UCF	Acrisure Bounce House	45,906	Addition Financial Arena	10,000	John Euliano Park	3,841	UCF Softball Complex	600		
Utah	Rice-Eccles Stadium	51,444	Jon M. Huntsman Center	15,000	America First Ballpark	1,200 (Note: Permanent seated capacity; grass seating brings the total capacity to 3,000.)	Dumke Family Softball Stadium	1,410		
West Virginia	Mountaineer Field at Milan Puskar Stadium	60,000	Hope Coliseum	14,000	Monongalia County Ballpark	3,500	Non-softball university			

== Key personnel ==
School	Athletic Director	Football Coach	Salary	Men's basketball coach	Salary	Women's basketball coach	Baseball coach	Softball coach
Arizona	Desiree Reed-Francois	Brent Brennan	$3,400,000	Tommy Lloyd	$7,200,000	Becky Burke	Chip Hale	Caitlin Lowe
Arizona State	Graham Rossini	Kenny Dillingham	$7,442,000	Randy Bennett	$3,000,000	Molly Miller	Willie Bloomquist	Megan Bartlett
Baylor	Doug McNamee	Dave Aranda	$4,702,570	Scott Drew	$5,474,290	Nicki Collen	Mitch Thompson	Glenn Moore
BYU	Brian Santiago	Kalani Sitake	NA†	Kevin Young	NA†	Lee Cummard	Trent Pratt	Gordon Eakin
Cincinnati	John Cunningham	Scott Satterfield	$3,700,000	Jerrod Calhoun	$3,700,000	Katrina Merriweather	Jordan Bischel	–
Colorado	Fernando Lovo	Deion Sanders	$8,975,000	Tad Boyle	$2,700,000	JR Payne	–	–
Houston	Eddie Nuñez	Willie Fritz	$4,500,000	Kelvin Sampson	$5,500,000	Matthew Mitchell	Todd Whitting	Chrissy Schoonmaker
Iowa State	Jamie Pollard	Jimmy Rogers	$3,000,000	T. J. Otzelberger	$4,300,000	Bill Fennelly	–	Jamie Pinkerton
Kansas	Travis Goff	Lance Leipold	$6,650,000	Bill Self	$8,853,800	Brandon Schneider	Dan Fitzgerald	Jennifer McFalls
Kansas State	Gene Taylor	Collin Klein	$4,300,000	Casey Alexander	$3,300,000	Jeff Mittie	Pete Hughes	–
Oklahoma State	Chad Weiberg	Eric Morris	$TBD	Steve Lutz	$2,550,000	Jacie Hoyt	Josh Holliday	Kenny Gajewski
TCU	Mike Buddie	Sonny Dykes	$7,036,013	Jamie Dixon	$4,365,321	Mark Campbell	Kirk Saarloos	–
Texas Tech	Kirby Hocutt	Joey McGuire	$4,554,960	Grant McCasland	$4,000,000	Krista Gerlich	Tim Tadlock	Gerry Glasco
UCF	Terry Mohajir	Scott Frost	$3,858,333	Johnny Dawkins	$2,200,000	Sytia Messer	Rich Wallace	Cindy Ball-Malone
Utah	Mark Harlan	Morgan Scalley	$5,100,000	Alex Jensen	$3,600,000	Gavin Petersen	Gary Henderson	Amy Hogue
West Virginia	Wren Baker	Rich Rodriguez	$3,600,000	Ross Hodge	$2,900,000	Mark Kellogg	Steve Sabins	–

Notes

†Private institution not required to release coaching salaries
•Salaries based on 2025–2026 academic year

== Championships ==
=== National team titles by institution ===
The national championships listed below are as of the 2025−26 season. Football, Helms, pre-NCAA competition and overall equestrian titles are included in the total, but excluded from the column listing NCAA and AIAW titles.

Big 12 National Championships
University	Total Titles	Titles as a member of the Big 12	NCAA titles	Men's	Women's	Co-ed^{†}	AIAW titles^{‡}	Notes
Oklahoma State	57	14	55	55	0	0	0	1 claimed football and equestrian title
Arizona State	43	0	25	12	13	0	18	
Colorado	30	9	28	16	3	9	1	1 claimed football title
Utah	29	2	27	2	9	16	2	
West Virginia	25	6	22	1	0	21	0	3 pre-NCAA rifle titles
Arizona	21	0	19	7	12	0	2	
Iowa State	19	0	13	13	0	0	6	
Houston	17	0	17	17	0	0	0	
BYU	14	2	13	7	6	0	0	1 claimed football title
Kansas	14	3	12	11	1	0	0	2 Helms basketball titles
TCU	9	3	7	1	2	4	0	2 claimed football titles
Baylor	5	5	5	2	3	0	0	
Texas Tech	3	2	3	2	1	0	0	
Cincinnati	2	0	2	2	0	0	0	
UCF	1	0	0	0	0	0	0	1 claimed football title
Kansas State	0	0	0	0	0	0	0	
Total	280	38	240	146	48	46	29	–

† Co-ed sports include fencing (since 1990), rifle, and skiing (since 1983). Team fencing championships before 1990 and team skiing championships before 1983 were awarded as men's or women's championships and are counted here as such.
‡ Includes titles won under the DGWS, predecessor of the AIAW.

=== Most recent NCAA championship ===
Legend for Most Recent National Title table by School
Indicator	Meaning
*	Most recent NCAA championship

University	Year	Sport
Arizona	2018	Women's Golf
Arizona State	2024	Men's Swimming & Dive
Baylor	2021	Men's Basketball
BYU	2024	Men's cross country
Cincinnati	1962	Men's Basketball
Colorado	2024	Skiing
Houston	1985	Men's Golf
Iowa State	1994	Men's Cross Country
Kansas	2022	Men's Basketball
Kansas State	–	–
Oklahoma State	2025	Men's Cross Country
TCU	2025	Beach Volleyball
Texas Tech	2024	Men's Indoor Track & Field
UCF	–	–
Utah	2026	Skiing
West Virginia*	2026	Rifle

=== National championships ===
The following is a list of all NCAA, equestrian, and college football championships won by teams that were representing the Big 12 Conference in NCAA-recognized sports at the time of their championship. The most recent Big 12 team to win a national title is Utah skiing in 2026. Only two years of the Big 12's existence has the conference not won at least one team national title, 2007 and 2020. However, in 2020 multiple National Championships were not awarded due to the COVID-19 pandemic.

One former member of the conference did not win a National Championship while a member of the Big 12, Missouri. Original members Kansas State and Iowa State have not won a championship while representing the Big 12. The only national championships won by 2012 arrival West Virginia since joining the Big 12 have been in rifle, a sport that the conference has never sponsored. Of the 2023 arrivals, Houston, UCF, and Cincinnati have not won a championship in the Big 12, but BYU has won in women's and men's cross country.

Men's swimming has the most overall championships with 10, while men's golf has the most different schools win a championship with 4.

== Fall Sports ==
=== Men's Sports ===
Cross Country (8)
Year	School
2001	Colorado
2004	Colorado
2006	Colorado
2009	Oklahoma State
2010	Oklahoma State
2012	Oklahoma State
2023	Oklahoma State
2024	BYU
2025	Oklahoma State

Football
Year	School	Selector(s)
1997	Nebraska	USAT/ESPN
2000	Oklahoma	AP, FWAA, NFF, USAT/ESPN
2005	Texas	AP, FWAA, NFF, USAT

=== Women's Sports ===
Women's Cross Country (3)
Year	School
2000	Colorado
2004	Colorado
2024	BYU

Women's Volleyball (5)
2000	Nebraska
2005	Nebraska
2012	Texas
2022	Texas
2023	Texas

== Winter Sports ==
=== Men's Sports ===
Men's Basketball (3)
Year	School
2008	Kansas
2021	Baylor
2022	Kansas

Men's Swimming (10)
Year	School
1996	Texas
2000	Texas
2001	Texas
2002	Texas
2010	Texas
2015	Texas
2016	Texas
2017	Texas
2018	Texas
2021	Texas

Men's Indoor Track (1)
Year	School
2024	Texas Tech

Wrestling (4)
Year	School
2003	Oklahoma State
2004	Oklahoma State
2005	Oklahoma State
2006	Oklahoma State

=== Women's Sports ===
Women's Basketball (4)
Year	School
2005	Baylor
2011	Texas A&M
2012	Baylor
2019	Baylor

Gymnastics (6)
Year	School
2014	Oklahoma
2016	Oklahoma
2017	Oklahoma
2019	Oklahoma
2022	Oklahoma
2023	Oklahoma

Women's Indoor Track & Field (3)
Year	School
1998	Texas
1999	Texas
2006	Texas

== Spring Sports ==
=== Men's Sports ===
Baseball (2)
Year	School
2002	Texas
2005	Texas

Men's Golf (7)
Year	School
2000	Oklahoma State
2006	Oklahoma State
2009	Texas A&M
2012	Texas
2017	Oklahoma
2018	Oklahoma State
2022	Texas
2025	Oklahoma State

Men's Gymnastics (9)
Year	School
2002	Oklahoma
2003	Oklahoma
2005	Oklahoma
2006	Oklahoma
2008	Oklahoma
2015	Oklahoma
2016	Oklahoma
2017	Oklahoma
2018	Oklahoma

Men's Tennis (3)
Year	School
2004	Baylor
2019	Texas
2024	TCU

Outdoor Track & Field (4)
Year	School
2009	Texas A&M
2010	Texas A&M
2011	Texas A&M
2019	Texas Tech

=== Women's Sports ===
Beach Volleyball (1)
Year	School
2024	TCU

Women's Outdoor Track (8)
Year	School
1998	Texas
1999	Texas
2005	Texas
2009	Texas A&M
2010	Texas A&M
2011	Texas A&M
2013	Kansas
2023	Texas

Women's Rowing (3)
Year	School
2021	Texas
2022	Texas
2024	Texas

Softball (8)
Year	School
2000	Oklahoma
2013	Oklahoma
2016	Oklahoma
2017	Oklahoma
2021	Oklahoma
2022	Oklahoma
2023	Oklahoma
2024	Oklahoma

Women's Tennis (2)
Year	School
2021	Texas
2022	Texas

Women's Bowling (5)
Year	School
1999	Nebraska
2001	Nebraska
2004	Nebraska
2005	Nebraska
2009	Nebraska

=== Combined Sports ===
Equestrian (3)
Year	School
2002	Texas A&M (Overall)
2012	Texas A&M (Overall)
2022	Oklahoma State (Overall)

Rifle (7)
2013	West Virginia
2014	West Virginia
2015	West Virginia
2016	West Virginia
2017	West Virginia
2019	TCU
2024	TCU
2025	West Virginia
2026	West Virginia

== Other NCAA championships ==
The following are NCAA championships won by Big 12 members, but in sports not sponsored by the conference.

=== Combined Sports ===
Men's/Women's Skiing (7)
Year	School
1998	Colorado
1999	Colorado
2006	Colorado
2011	Colorado
2024	Colorado
2025	Utah
2026	Utah

=== Conference champions ===
The Conference sponsors 23 sports, 10 men's and 13 women's.

In football, divisional titles were awarded based on regular-season conference results, with the teams with the best conference records from the North and South playing in the Big 12 Championship Game from 1996 to 2010. Baseball, basketball, softball, tennis and women's soccer titles are awarded in both regular-season and tournament play. Cross country, golf, gymnastics, swimming and diving, track and field, and wrestling titles are awarded during an annual meet of participating teams. The volleyball title is awarded based on regular-season play.

All-Time Big 12 Championships by University (through November 14, 2026)
University	Years	Regular Season	Postseason	Total
Arizona Wildcats	2024–present	2	4	6
Arizona State Sun Devils	2024–present	3	6	9
Baylor Bears	1996–present	48	41	89
BYU Cougars	2023–present	1	8	9
Cincinnati Bearcats	2023–present	0	0	0
Colorado Buffaloes	1996–2011, 2024–present	5	29	34
Houston Cougars	2023–present	2	1	3
Iowa State Cyclones	1996–present	4	28	32
Kansas Jayhawks	1996–present	26	21	47
Kansas State Wildcats	1996–present	11	7	18
Oklahoma State Cowboys	1996–present	16	91	107
TCU Horned Frogs	2012–present	17	12	29
Texas Tech Red Raiders	1996–present	17	28	45
UCF Knights	2023–present	2	2	4
Utah Utes	2024–present	2	2	4
West Virginia Mountaineers	2012–present	8	7	15

== Football ==
The first football game in conference play was Texas Tech vs. Kansas State in 1996, won by Kansas State, 21–14.

From 1996 to 2010, Big 12 Conference teams played eight conference games a season. Each team faced all five opponents within its own division and three teams from the opposite division. Inter-divisional play was a "three-on, three-off" system, where teams would play three teams from the other division on a home-and-home basis for two seasons, and then play the other three foes from the opposite side for a two-year home-and-home.

This format came under considerable criticism, especially from Nebraska and Oklahoma, who were denied a yearly match between two of college football's most storied programs. The Nebraska–Oklahoma rivalry was one of the most intense in college football history. (Until 2006, the teams had never met in the Big 12 Championship.) Due to the departure of Nebraska and Colorado in 2011, the Big 12 eliminated the divisions (and championship game) and instituted a nine-game round-robin format. With the advent of the College Football Playoff committee looking at teams' strength of schedule for picking the four playoff teams, on December 8, 2015, the Big 12 announced an annual requirement for all Big 12 teams to schedule a non-conference game against a team from the four other Power Five conferences (plus Notre Dame). Per Big 12 commissioner Bob Bowlsby: "Schedule strength is a key component in CFP Selection Committee deliberations. This move will strengthen the resumes for all Big 12 teams. Coupled with the nine-game full round robin Conference schedule our teams play, it will not only benefit the teams at the top of our standings each season, but will impact the overall strength of the Conference." The Big 12 has made it to the Playoffs 8 times from 2014 to 2025. Five Big 12 participants have made it to the playoff: Oklahoma in 2015, 2017, 2018, and 2019; TCU in 2022; Texas in 2023; and Arizona State in 2024 and Texas Tech in 2025.

=== Championship game ===
The Big 12 Championship Game was approved by all members except Nebraska. It was held each year, commencing with the first match in the 1996 season at the Trans World Dome in St. Louis. It pitted the division champions against each other after the regular season was completed.

Following the 2008 game, the event was moved to the new Cowboys Stadium in Arlington, Texas, being played there in 2009 and 2010. In 2010, the Sooners defeated the Cornhuskers 23–20.

After 2010, the game was moved to Arlington for 2011, 2012, and 2013. However, the decision became moot following the 2010 season because the league lacked sufficient members.

In April 2015, the ACC and the Big 12 developed new rules for the NCAA to deregulate conference championship games. The measure passed on January 14, 2016, allowing a conference with fewer than 12 teams to stage a championship game that does not count against the FBS limit of 12 regular-season games under either of the following circumstances:

- The game involves the top two teams following a full round-robin conference schedule.
- The game involves two divisional winners, each having played a full round-robin schedule in its division.

Under the first criterion, the Big 12 championship game resumed at the conclusion of the 2017 regular season, and is played during the first weekend of December, the time all other FBS conference championship games are played.

=== Bowl affiliations ===
The post-season bowl game tie-ins for the Big 12 for the 2026 seasons are as follows. If additional Big 12 teams are selected to participate in the College Football Playoff, all other bowl-eligible teams move up one spot in the order.

Pick	Name	Location	Opposing conference	Opposing pick
1	College Football Playoff	Misc.	All FBS Conferences	N/A
2	Alamo Bowl	San Antonio, Texas	Legacy Pac-12 (Big Ten, Big 12, ACC)	1
3	Pop-Tarts Bowl	Orlando, Florida	ACC	2/3/4
4	Texas Bowl	Houston, Texas	SEC	3/4/5/6/7/8
5	Liberty Bowl	Memphis, Tennessee	SEC	3/4/5/6/7/8
6	Cactus Bowl	Tempe, Arizona	Big Ten	7
7	Independence Bowl	Shreveport, Louisiana	Legacy Pac-12 (Big Ten, Big 12, ACC)	6
8	ESPN Events Bowls	Misc.	All FBS Conferences	Last

== Rivalries ==
The Big 12 is known for rivalries (primarily in football) that mostly predate the conference. The Kansas-Missouri rivalry was the longest running, the longest west of the Mississippi, and the second longest in college football, dating back to the Missouri Valley Intercollegiate Athletic Association before evolving into the Big Eight. It was played 119 times before Missouri left the Big 12. From that time, the University of Kansas' athletic department did not accept Missouri's invitations to play inter-conference rivalry games, putting the rivalry on hold, until men's basketball played in December 2021 and football in September 2025. Sports clubs sponsored by the two universities continued to play each other.

The rivalry between TCU and Baylor, known as the Revivalry, is also one of the longest running in college football, with the two universities having played each other — largely as Southwest Conference members — 122 times since 1899. Following the 2026 game, TCU leads the series 61–54–7.

The rivalry between Iowa State and Kansas State is the longest continuously running rivalry, meaning it has been played every year the longest. Iowa State leads, 55–50–4. Although the rivalry was not protected by the Big Twelve.

The rivalry between Arizona and Arizona State in which winner receives the Territorial Cup, created 127 years ago for the 1899 champion between schools in Arizona and which the NCAA has certified as the oldest rivalry trophy in college football.

After the conference's 2024 expansion, only four rivalries were "protected" (i.e., guaranteed of being played each season)—Arizona–Arizona State, Baylor–TCU, BYU–Utah, and Kansas–Kansas State. These are highlighted in bold in the table below.

Several schools within the Big 12 also maintain rivalries with schools from other conferences. Iowa State plays the University of Iowa Football Team (the latter from the Big Ten Conference) in football each year for the "Cy-Hawk" trophy. Other rivalries include the Iron Skillet football game between TCU and SMU (of the Atlantic Coast Conference-ACC); and the "War on I-4" football game between UCF and USF (of the American Athletic Conference-AAC). However, the latter two rivalry games are no longer played on an annual basis due to conference realignment and scheduling difficulties.

Some of the football rivalries between Big 12 universities include:

Rivalry	Name	Trophy	Games played^{†}	Began	Record	Current Win Streak
**Arizona–Arizona State**	Duel in the Desert	Territorial Cup	99	1899	Arizona 52–45–1	Arizona 1
Baylor–Houston			31	1950	Tied 15–15–1	Houston 1
**Baylor–TCU**	Bluebonnet Battle / Revivalry		122	1899	TCU 61–54–7	TCU 2
Baylor–Texas Tech			83	1929	Baylor 42–40–1	Baylor 1
**BYU–Utah**	Holy War	Beehive Boot	104	1896	Utah 63–37–4	Utah 1
Cincinnati–UCF			11	2015	Cincinnati 6–5	Cincinnati 2
Cincinnati–West Virginia			23	1921	West Virginia 19–3–1	West Virginia 4
Colorado–Kansas State			69	1912	Colorado 46–22–1	Colorado 1
Colorado–Utah	Rumble in the Rockies		73	1903	Utah 37–33–3	Utah 2
Houston–Texas Tech			37	1951	Tied 18–18–1	Texas Tech 8
Iowa State–Kansas State	Farmageddon		108	1917	Iowa State 55–50–4	Iowa State 3
**Kansas–Kansas State**	Sunflower Showdown	Governor's Cup	124	1902	Kansas 65–54–5	Kansas State 18
TCU–Texas Tech	West Texas Championship	The Saddle Trophy	67	1926	Texas Tech 33–31–3	TCU 1

== Men's Basketball ==
As of the end of the 2025–2026 season, nine current Big 12 members are among the teams with the most wins and/or the highest win percentage in NCAA Division 1 men's basketball: Kansas (#2 in wins, #3 in percentage), Arizona (#13 wins, #7 percentage), Cincinnati (#14 wins, #19 percentage), BYU (#15 wins, #31 percentage), Utah (#19 wins, #22 percentage), West Virginia (#21 wins, #36 percentage), Houston (#37 percentage), Oklahoma State (#41 wins), and Kansas State (#46 wins). On the list of the most Final Four appearances, Kansas is #5, Houston is #11, Cincinnati, Oklahoma State are all tied (with several other schools) at #12 and Arizona is #13.

From 1996 to 2011, standings in conference play were not split among divisions, although the schedule was structured as if they were. Teams played a home-and-home against teams within their divisions and a single game against teams from the opposite division for a total of 16 conference games. After Nebraska and Colorado left, Big 12 play transitioned to an 18-game, double round robin schedule. When the conference temporarily expanded to 14 members for the 2023–24 season, the 18-game schedule remained, but the double round-robin was discontinued in favor of a new scheduling formula.

In 2024–25, the Big 12 played a 20-game schedule, but due to input from coaches the league will play an 18-game schedule in 2025–26.

=== Conference champions ===
Kansas has the most Big 12 titles, winning or sharing the regular-season title 20 times in the league's 25 seasons, including 13 straight from 2004–05 to 2016–17. The 2002 Jayhawks became the first, and so far only, team to complete an undefeated Big 12 regular season, going 16–0. Though rematches between Big 12 regular season co-champions have happened in that year's Big 12 tournament, none have met in the ensuing NCAA Tournament.

Season	Regular season champion	Tournament champion
1996–97	Kansas	Kansas
1997–98	Kansas (2)	Kansas (2)
1998–99	Texas	Kansas (3)
1999–00	Iowa State	Iowa State
2000–01	Iowa State (2)	Oklahoma
2001–02	Kansas (3)	Oklahoma (2)
2002–03	Kansas (4)	Oklahoma (3)
2003–04	Oklahoma State	Oklahoma State
2004–05	Oklahoma; Kansas (5)	Oklahoma State (2)
2005–06	Texas (2); Kansas (6)	Kansas (4)
2006–07	Kansas (7)	Kansas (5)
2007–08	Texas (3); Kansas (8)	Kansas (6)
2008–09	Kansas (9)	Missouri
2009–10	Kansas (10)	Kansas (7)
2010–11	Kansas (11)	Kansas (8)
2011–12	Kansas (12)	Missouri (2)
2012–13	Kansas (13); Kansas State	Kansas (9)
2013–14	Kansas (14)	Iowa State (2)
2014–15	Kansas (15)	Iowa State (3)
2015–16	Kansas (16)	Kansas (10)
2016–17	Kansas (17)	Iowa State (4)
2017–18	Kansas [18]*	Kansas [11]*
2018–19	Kansas State (2); Texas Tech	Iowa State (5)
2019–20	Kansas (19 [18])	Canceled**
2020–21	Baylor	Texas
2021–22	Kansas (20 [19]); Baylor (2)	Kansas (12 [11])
2022–23	Kansas (21 [20])	Texas (2)
2023–24	Houston	Iowa State (6)
2024–25	Houston (2)	Houston
2025–26	Arizona (1)	Arizona (1)

In 2004–05, Oklahoma won the Big 12 Tournament seeding tiebreaker over Kansas based on its 71–63 win over the Jayhawks in Norman, OK. The teams did not meet in Kansas City, MO.
In 2005–06, Texas won the Big 12 Tournament seeding tiebreaker over Kansas based on its 80–55 win over the Jayhawks in Austin, TX. Kansas beat Texas 80–68 in the Big 12 Tournament championship game in Dallas, TX.
In 2007–08, Texas won the Big 12 Tournament seeding tiebreaker over Kansas based on its 72–69 win over the Jayhawks in Austin, TX. Kansas beat Texas 84–74 in the Big 12 Tournament championship game in Kansas City, MO.
In 2012–13, Kansas won the Big 12 Tournament seeding tiebreaker over Kansas State based on winning 59–55 in Manhattan and 83–62 in Lawrence. Kansas beat Kansas State for a third time 70–54 in the championship game in Kansas City, MO.
*Due to the use of an ineligible player, Kansas was forced to vacate 15 victories from its 2017-18 season, including the Big 12 regular season and postseason championships the Jayhawks won that year. The bracketed numbers in subsequent are the official number of titles counting those that were vacated.
**The 2020 Big 12 Tournament was cancelled due to COVID-19.
In 2021–22, Kansas won the seeding tiebreaker over Baylor for the Big 12 Tournament, as Kansas had gone 1–1 against third place team Texas Tech, while Baylor had been swept by Texas Tech.

=== National championships, Final Fours, and NCAA tournament appearances ===
Big 12 Conference basketball programs have combined to win 7 NCAA men's basketball championships as Big 12 members and 11 NCAA men's basketball championships overall. Kansas has won four, Oklahoma State and Cincinnati have won two, Arizona, Baylor and Utah have one each. Twelve teams have advanced to the Final Four at least once in their history. Ten Big 12 schools (Arizona, BYU, Cincinnati, Houston, Iowa State, Kansas, Kansas State, Oklahoma State, Utah, West Virginia) are among the national top 50 in all-time NCAA tournament appearances.

School	Men's NCAA Championships	Men's NCAA Runner-Up	Men's NCAA Final Fours	Men's NCAA Elite Eights	Men's NCAA Sweet Sixteens	Men's NCAA Tournament Appearances
Arizona	1 (1997)	1 (2001)	5 (1998, 1994, 1997, 2001, 2026)	12 (1976, 1988, 1994, 1997, 1998, 2001, 2003, 2005, 2011, 2014, 2015, 2026)	22 (1976, 1988, 1989, 1991, 1994, 1996, 1997, 1998, 2001, 2002, 2003, 2005, 2009, 2011, 2013, 2014, 2015, 2017, 2022, 2024, 2025, 2026)	40 (1951, 1976, 1977, 1985–2009, 2011, 2013–18, 2022–26)
Arizona State				3 (1961, 1963, 1975)	4 (1961, 1963, 1973, 1975)	16 (1958, 1961–64, 1973, 1975, 1980, 1981, 1991, 2003, 2009, 2014, 2018, 2019, 2023)
Baylor	1 (2021)	1 (1948)	3 (1948, 1950, 2021)	6 (1946, 1948, 1950, 2010, 2012, 2021)	5 (2010, 2012, 2014, 2017, 2021)	17 (1946, 1948, 1950, 1988, 2008, 2010, 2012, 2014–17, 2019–25)
BYU				3 (1950, 1951, 1981)	6 (1957, 1965, 1971, 1981, 2011, 2025)	33 (1950, 1951, 1957, 1965, 1969, 1971, 1972, 1979–81, 1984, 1987, 1988, 1990–93, 1995, 2001, 2003, 2004, 2007–12, 2014, 2015, 2021, 2024–26)
Cincinnati	2 (1961, 1962)	1 (1963)	6 (1959–63, 1992)	8 (1959–63, 1992, 1993, 1996)	13 (1958–63, 1966, 1975, 1992, 1993, 1996, 2001, 2012)	33 (1958–63, 1966, 1975–77, 1992–2005, 2011–19)
Colorado			2 (1942, 1955)	6 (1940, 1942, 1946, 1955, 1962, 1963)	5 (1954, 1955, 1962, 1963, 1969)	16 (1940, 1942, 1946, 1954, 1955, 1962, 1963, 1969, 1997, 2003, 2012–14, 2016, 2021, 2024)
Houston		3 (1983, 1984, 2025	7 (1967, 1968, 1982–84, 2021, 2025	8 (1967, 1968, 1982–84, 2021, 2022, 2025	18 (1956, 1961, 1965–68, 1970, 1971, 1982–84, 2019, 2021–23, 2024–26	18 (1956, 1961, 1965–68, 1970–73, 1978, 1981–84, 1987, 1990, 1992, 2010, 2018–26
Iowa State			1 (1944	2 (1944, 2000	8 (1986, 1997, 2000, 2014, 2016, 2022, 2024, 2026	25 (1944, 1985, 1986, 1988, 1989, 1992, 1993, 1995–97, 2000, 2001, 2005, 2012–17, 2019, 2022–26
Kansas	4 (1952, 1988, 2008, 2022	6 (1940, 1953, 1957, 1991, 2003, 2012	15 (1940, 1952, 1953, 1957, 1971, 1974, 1986, 1988, 1991, 1993, 2002, 2003, 2008, 2012, 2022	24 (1940, 1942, 1952, 1953, 1957, 1960, 1966, 1971, 1974, 1986, 1988, 1991, 1993, 1996, 2002–04, 2007, 2008, 2011, 2012, 2016, 2017, 2022	31 (1952, 1953, 1957, 1960, 1966, 1967, 1971, 1974, 1981, 1986–88, 1991, 1993, 1994–97, 2001–04, 2007–09, 2011–13, 2016, 2017, 2022	53 (1940, 1942, 1952, 1953, 1957, 1960, 1966, 1967, 1971, 1974, 1975, 1978, 1981, 1984–88, 1990–2017, 2019–26
Kansas State		1 (1951	4 ( 1948, 1951, 1958, 1964	14 (1948, 1951, 1958, 1959, 1961, 1964, 1972, 1973, 1975, 1981, 1988, 2010, 2018, 2023	18 (1951, 1956, 1958, 1959, 1961, 1964, 1968, 1970, 1972, 1973, 1975, 1977, 1981, 1982, 1988, 2010, 2018, 2023	32 (1948, 1951, 1956, 1958, 1959, 1961, 1964, 1968, 1970, 1972, 1973, 1975, 1977, 1980–82, 1987–90, 1993, 1996, 2008, 2010–14, 2017–19, 2023
Oklahoma State	2 (1945, 1946	1 (1949	6 (1945, 1946, 1949, 1951, 1995, 2004	11 (1945, 1946, 1949, 1951, 1953, 1954, 1958, 1965, 1995, 2000, 2004	14 (1945, 1946, 1949, 1951, 1953, 1954, 1958, 1965, 1991, 1992, 1995, 2000, 2004, 2005	29 (1945, 1946, 1949, 1951, 1953, 1954, 1958, 1965, 1983, 1991–95, 1998–05, 2009, 2010, 2013–15, 2017, 2021
TCU				1 (1968	4 (1952, 1953, 1959, 1968	12 (1952, 1953, 1959, 1968, 1971, 1987, 1998, 2018, 2022–24, 2026
Texas Tech		1 (2019	1 (2019	3 (2018, 2019, 2025	9 (1961, 1962, 1976, 1996, 2005, 2018, 2019, 2022, 2025	21 (1954, 1956, 1961, 1962, 1973, 1976, 1985, 1986, 1993, 1995, 2002, 2004, 2005, 2007, 2016–22, 2024–26
UCF						6 (1994, 1996, 2004, 2005, 2019, 2026
Utah	1 (1944	1 (1998	4 (1944, 1961, 1966, 1998	7 (1944, 1945, 1956, 1961, 1966, 1997, 1998	18 (1944, 1945, 1955, 1956, 1959–61, 1966, 1977, 1978, 1981, 1983, 1991, 1996–98, 2005, 2015	29 (1944, 1945, 1955, 1956, 1959–61, 1966, 1977–79, 1981, 1983, 1986, 1991, 1993, 1995–00, 2002–05, 2009, 2015, 2016
West Virginia		1 (1959	2 (1959, 2010	3 (1959, 2005, 2010	11 (1959, 1960, 1963, 1998, 2005, 2006, 2008, 2010, 2015, 2017, 2018	31 (1955–60, 1962, 1963, 1965, 1967, 1982–84, 1986, 1987, 1989, 1992, 1998, 2005, 2006, 2008–12, 2015–18, 2021, 2023

Seasons are listed by the calendar years in which they ended. Italics indicate honors earned before the school competed in the Big 12.

=== All-time wins ===
Team	Big 12 Record	Big 12 Winning %	Overall record	Overall winning %	Big 12 regular season championships	Big 12 tournament championships
Arizona	30–8	.789	1949–1002–1	.660	1	1
Arizona State	11–27	.289	1498–1339	.528	-	-
Baylor	238–270	.469	1516–1440	.513	2	-
BYU	33–23	.589	1941–1167	.625	-	-
UCF	23–33	.411	915–717	.561	-	-
Cincinnati	23–33	.411	1948–1110	.637	-	-
Houston	48–8	.857	1498–893	.627	2	1
Colorado	108–181	.374	1457–1309	.527	-	-
Iowa State	240–272	.469	1514–1416	.517	2	6
Kansas	403–109	.787	2438–920	.726	21	12
Kansas State	224–288	.438	1768–1275	.581	2	-
Oklahoma State	250–262	.488	1785–1282	.582	1	2
TCU	88–164	.349	1358–1504	.474	-	-
Texas Tech	223–288	.436	1542–1189	.565	1	-
Utah	10–28	.263	1924–1123	.631	-	-
West Virginia	120–133	.474	1895–1202	.612	-	-

Totals though the end of the 2025−26 regular season.

=== All-time series record ===
Totals from though the end of the 2024–25 season.
Includes any regular season match up regardless of conference affiliation or postseason meetings.

	vs. Arizona	vs. Arizona State	vs. Baylor	vs. BYU	vs. UCF	vs. Cincinnati	vs. Colorado	vs. Houston	vs. Iowa State	vs. Kansas	vs. Kansas State	vs. Oklahoma State	vs. TCU	vs. Texas Tech	vs. Utah	vs. West Virginia	Total
Arizona	—	165–87	8–5	23–20	3–0	6–0	28–16	8–8	7–4	6–10	7–9	5–0	3–2	26–30	42–31	5–3	342–225
Arizona State	87–165	—	2–8	22–30	0–1	1–3	14–16	3–4	2–2	6–6	6–6	3–6	2–4	19–24	28–38	1–0	186–311
Baylor	5–8	8–2	—	6–7	2–0	2–1	12–16	16–41	25–25	11–37	27–26	38–57	110–90	65–85	2–3	18–8	346–406
BYU	20–23	30–22	7–6	—	4–0	3–3	7–17	3–8	3–7	3–4	5–5	6–4	20–4	3–4	135–130	3–2	253–236
UCF	0–3	1–0	0–2	0–4	—	6–18	2–2	11–25	0–3	1–3	1–3	4–1	2–2	1–2	3–0	1–3	33–67
Cincinnati	0–6	3–1	1–2	3–3	18–6	—	8–1	33–17	4–5	5–5	8–3	3–5	7–1	2–1	4–2	12–13	127–92
Colorado	16–28	16–14	16–12	17–7	2–2	1–8	—	3–5	78–73	40–126	48–97	61–49	4–3	13–19	12–19	1–1	329–461
Houston	8–8	4–3	41–16	8–3	25–11	17–33	5–3	—	5–5	5–6	5–5	10–13	51–26	32–28	1–1	3–0	221–159
Iowa State	4–7	2–2	25–25	7–3	3–0	5–4	73–78	5–5	—	69–191	95–147	68–72	18–15	24–22	2–2	10–15	410–586
Kansas	10–6	6–6	37–11	4–3	3–1	5–5	126–40	6–5	191–69	—	206–97	126–60	27–4	43–9	2–1	27–8	818–324
Kansas State	9–7	6–6	26–27	5–5	3–1	3–8	97–48	5–5	147–95	97–206	—	88–60	21–14	26–26	2–2	13–16	551–525
Oklahoma State	0–5	6–3	57–38	4–6	1–4	5–3	49–61	13–10	72–68	60–126	60–88	—	29–15	50–28	5–2	13–13	425–471
TCU	2–3	4–2	90–110	4–20	2–2	1–7	3–4	26–51	15–18	4–27	14–21	15–29	—	57–88	16–7	8–19	260–406
Texas Tech	30–26	24–19	85–65	4–3	2–1	1–2	19–13	28–32	22–24	9–43	26–26	28–50	88–57	—	3–5	11–18	379–384
Utah	31–42	38–28	3–2	130–135	0–3	2–4	19–12	1–1	2–2	1–2	2–2	2–5	7–16	5–3	—	6–2	249–259
West Virginia	3–5	0–1	8–18	2–3	3–1	13–12	1–1	0–3	15–10	8–27	16–13	13–13	19–8	18–11	2–6	—	120–132

=== Big 12 series record ===
1997−2026 as Big 12 Members

	vs. Arizona	vs. Arizona State	vs. Baylor	vs. BYU	vs. UCF	vs. Cincinnati	vs. Colorado	vs. Houston	vs. Iowa State	vs. Kansas	vs. Kansas State	vs. Oklahoma State	vs. TCU	vs. Texas Tech	vs. Utah	vs. West Virginia	Total
Arizona	—	4–0	3–0	3–1	2–0	3–0	1–0	1–1	2–1	1–2	1–1	2–0	2–0	1–2	2–0	2–0	30–8
Arizona State	0–4	—	1–2	0–3	0–2	1–1	2–2	0–2	0–3	1–1	2–1	1–1	1–2	0–2	2–1	1–1	11–27
Baylor	0–3	2–0	—	1–3	3–0	2–2	7–10	0–5	23–20	9–34	23–19	30–27	18–8	31–27	3–0	17–7	238–270
BYU	1–3	2–0	3–1	—	3–1	1–3	2–0	0–3	3–1	2–1	3–1	2–2	2–1	1–3	3–1	3–1	33–23
UCF	0–2	2–0	0–3	1–3	—	1–4	2–1	0–4	0–4	2–2	2–1	2–3	3–1	3–1	2–0	1–4	23–33
Cincinnati	0–2	1–1	2–2	3–1	4–1	—	2–0	0–5	1–2	1–2	2–2	1–2	2–2	1–2	2–1	1–5	23–33
Colorado	0–2	2–2	10–7	0–2	1–2	0–2	—	0–2	14–19	1–32	16–16	8–9	2–1	9–9	2–1	0–2	105–173
Houston	1–1	2–0	5–0	3–0	4–0	5–0	2–0	—	2–2	3–2	3–0	4–0	2–1	3–2	2–0	4–0	48–8
Iowa State	1–2	2–0	20–23	1–3	4–0	2–1	19–14	2–2	—	16–43	29–30	20–23	16–10	21–21	2–0	10–15	240–270
Kansas	2–1	1–1	34–9	1–2	2–2	2–1	32–1	2–3	43–16	—	51–9	32–11	22–3	33–9	1–1	16–9	403–109
Kansas State	1–1	1–2	19–23	1–3	1–2	2–2	16–16	0–3	30–29	9–51	—	18–26	14–12	18–24	1–1	13–14	224–288
Oklahoma State	0–2	1–1	27–30	2–2	3–2	2–1	9–8	0–4	23–20	11–32	26–18	—	12–14	35–24	2–1	13–12	250–262
TCU	1–2	1–0	8–18	1–1	2–2	1–3	1–2	1–2	10–16	3–22	12–14	14–12	—	10–16	0–2	9–18	88–165
Texas Tech	2–1	2–1	27–31	3–1	1–3	2–1	9–9	2–3	21–21	9–33	24–18	24–35	16–10	—	2–0	11–14	223–288
Utah	0–2	1–2	0–3	1–3	0–2	1–2	1–2	0–2	0–2	1–1	1–1	1–2	1–0	1–2	—	1–2	10–28
West Virginia	0–2	1–1	7–17	1–3	4–1	5–1	2–0	0–4	15–10	9–16	14–13	12–13	18–9	14–11	2–1	—	120–133

== Baseball ==
All current Big 12 members sponsor baseball except Colorado, which never sponsored baseball during its first conference tenure and still does not sponsor the sport, and Iowa State, which dropped the sport after the 2001 season. All other former Big 12 members sponsored the sport throughout their tenures in the conference.

Baseball titles by university
Team	Season	Regular Season	Tournament	Total
Arizona	2025–present	0	1	1
Arizona State	2025–present	0	0	0
Baylor	1997–present	3	1	4
BYU	2024–present	0	0	0
Cincinnati	2024–present	0	0	0
Houston	2024–present	0	0	0
Iowa State	1997–2001	0	0	0
Kansas	1997–present	1	1	2
Kansas State	1997–present	1	0	1
Missouri	1997–2012	0	1	1
Nebraska	1997–2011	3	4	7
Oklahoma	1997–2024	1	3	4
Oklahoma State	1997–present	2	4	6
TCU	2013–present	3	4	7
Texas	1997–2024	10	5	15
Texas A&M	1997–2012	4	3	7
Texas Tech	1997–present	4	1	5
UCF	2024–present	0	0	0
Utah	2025–present	0	0	0
West Virginia	2013–present	2	0	2

Baseball titles by season
Season	Regular season	Tournament
1997	Texas Tech	Oklahoma
1998	Texas A&M	Texas Tech
1999	Texas A&M	Nebraska
2000	Baylor	Nebraska
2001	Nebraska	Nebraska
2002	Texas	Texas
2003	Nebraska	Texas
2004	Texas	Oklahoma State
2005	Baylor^{†}	Nebraska
2005	Nebraska^{†}	Nebraska
2006	Texas	Kansas
2007	Texas	Texas A&M
2008	Texas A&M	Texas
2009	Texas	Texas
2010	Texas	Texas A&M
2011	Texas^{†}	Texas A&M
2011	Texas A&M^{†}	Texas A&M
2012	Baylor University	Missouri
2013	Kansas State	Oklahoma
2014	Oklahoma State	TCU
2015	TCU	Texas
2016	Texas Tech	TCU
2017	TCU^{†}	Oklahoma State
2017	Texas Tech^{†}	Oklahoma State
2018	Texas	Baylor
2019	Texas Tech	Oklahoma State
2020	none	none
2021	Texas^{†}	TCU
2021	TCU^{†}	TCU
2022	TCU	Oklahoma
2023	Texas^{†}	TCU
2023	Oklahoma State^{†}	TCU
2023	West Virginia^{†}	TCU
2024	Oklahoma	Oklahoma State
2025	West Virginia	Arizona
2026	Kansas	Kansas

=== NCAA tournament performance ===
Totals through the end of the 2026 season.

University	NCAA Appearances	CWS Appearances	CWS Championships	Championship Seasons
Arizona	44	19	4	1976, 1980, 1986, 2012
Arizona State	42	22	5	1965, 1967, 1969, 1977, 1981
Baylor	21	3	0	-
BYU	16	2	0	-
Cincinnati	9	0	0	-
Houston	22	2	0	-
Iowa State	3	2	0	-
Kansas	7	1	0	-
Kansas State	6	0	0	-
Oklahoma State	51	20	1	1959
TCU	20	6	0	-
Texas Tech	18	4	0	-
UCF	14	0	0	-
Utah	5	1	0	-
West Virginia	17	1	0	-

== Broadcasting and media rights ==
The Big 12's media rights are controlled primarily by ESPN (ABC, ESPN, ESPN2, ESPNU, and ESPN+) and Fox Sports (Fox and FS1). Since 2012, ESPN has sublicensed college basketball games to CBS Sports. Beginning in 2025, ESPN will sublicense college football and basketball games to TNT Sports.

=== 2012 media deal ===
On September 7, 2012, the Big 12 announced a 13-year agreement with ESPN and Fox valued at $2.6 billion in total. ESPN and Fox split college football rights, while the basketball inventory was held by ESPN with sublicensing options for CBS Sports and Fox Sports. The agreement also included a grant of rights for all current Big 12 teams over the period of the contract.

In addition to the national agreement, each Big 12 university maintained the right to sell its "third-tier" covering selected events per-season (including one football game, basketball games, and other events outside of those sports). The third-tier rights to the Texas Longhorns are held through a channel dedicated to the team — Longhorn Network — which is operated by ESPN. In 2019, ESPN announced that it would acquire the third-tier rights to all Big 12 teams through 2024–25 (excluding Oklahoma and Texas, which are still under long-term contracts with ESPN+ and Longhorn Network respectively), and place their content on its subscription streaming service ESPN+. ESPN also acquired exclusive rights to all future Big 12 football championship games, replacing the previous alternation between ESPN and Fox.

=== 2025 extension deal ===
On October 30, 2022, the Big 12 announced that it had reached early broadcast deal to renew rights with ESPN network (includes ABC rights) and Fox. It is a six-year media rights agreement worth a total of $2.3 billion, but also reportedly includes an "escalator clause" that will raise the value of the contracts if only Power Five schools are added. By striking a deal prior to the exclusive negotiating window with ESPN and Fox, the Big 12 managed to achieve several of its primary objectives of stability and security, including the ability to consult its member schools to seek an extended grant of rights and potential future conference expansion. Fox's deal also places a slate of Big 12 college basketball games on Fox Sports for the first time.

- ESPN:
  - Football games will primarily air in a primetime window on ESPN
  - Rights to the football Big 12 Championship Game
  - Rights to the Big 12 basketball championship
  - Rights to a slate of college basketball games
  - Primary streaming partner under the branding Big 12 Now on ESPN+
- Fox Sports:
  - 26 football games per season:
  - Rights to a slate of college basketball games
- TNT Sports
  - College football, men's basketball, and women's basketball games that would normally be broadcast on ESPN's streaming service ESPN+ will be licensed to TNT Sports to be broadcast on TNT and/or TBS, as well as the Max streaming service.
- CBS
  - Sublicense rights to select college basketball games
- NFL Network:
  - Will air conference wide Pro Day on NFL Network

=== Big 12 Studios ===
In 2024, the Big 12 announced the creation of a Free ad-supported streaming television channel, Big 12 Studios, which will show content related to the games. The channel is operated in partnership with Raycom Sports.
