= 2024 NCAA Skiing Championships =

American college skiing competition

2024 NCAA Skiing tournament
- Teams: 23
- Format: Duration scoring
- Finals site: Steamboat Springs, Colorado
- Champions: Colorado Buffaloes (21st title)
- Runner-up: Utah Utes
- Semifinalists: Denver Pioneers; Dartmouth Big Green
- Television: NCAA

The 2024 NCAA Skiing Championships took place from March 6 to March 9 in Steamboat Springs, Colorado, at Howelsen Hill Ski Area, which hosted the cross-country events, and Steamboat Resort on Mount Werner, which hosted the alpine events. The tournament went into its 70th consecutive NCAA Skiing Championships, and featured twenty-three teams across all divisions.

== Team results ==
- Note: Top 10 only
- (H): Team from hosting U.S. state

Rank	Team	Points
1st place, gold medalist(s)	Colorado (H)	569.5
2nd place, silver medalist(s)	Utah	567.5
3rd place, bronze medalist(s)	Denver (H)	491
4	Dartmouth	399
5	Montana State	329
6	Vermont	300
7	Alaska Anchorage	274
8	New Hampshire	192
9	Alaska Fairbanks	175
10	Middlebury	159

== Individual Results ==
- Note: Table does not include consolation
- (H): Individual from hosting U.S. State

Games	First	Second	Third
Women's giant slalom details	Magdalena Luczak; Colorado (H)	Madison Hoffman; Utah	Denise Dingsleder; Colorado (H)
Women's giant slalom details	Magdalena Luczak; Colorado (H)	Madison Hoffman; Utah	Evelina Fredricsson (Utah) Westminster
Women's 7.5K freestyle details	Sydney Palmer-Leger; Utah	Haley Brewster; Vermont	Jasmine Drolet (New Hampshire) Dartmouth
Women's 7.5K freestyle details	Sydney Palmer-Leger; Utah	Haley Brewster; Vermont	Tilde Baangman; Montana State
Women's slalom details	Magdalena Luczak; Colorado (H)	Madison Hoffman; Utah	Nora Brand (Colorado) Denver (H)
Women's slalom details	Magdalena Luczak; Colorado (H)	Madison Hoffman; Utah	Sara Rask (Colorado) Denver (H)
Women's 20K classic details	Jasmine Drolet (New Hampshire) Dartmouth	Haley Brewster; Vermont	Sydney Palmer-Leger; Utah
Women's 20K classic details	Jasmine Drolet (New Hampshire) Dartmouth	Haley Brewster; Vermont	Hanna Abrahamsson; Colorado (H)
Men's giant slalom details	Mikkel Solbakken; Utah	Sindre Myklebust; Utah	Christian Soevik (Colorado) Denver (H)
Men's giant slalom details	Mikkel Solbakken; Utah	Sindre Myklebust; Utah	Isac Hedstrom; New Hampshire
Men's 7.5K freestyle details	John Steel Hagenbuch (New Hampshire) Dartmouth	Joe Davies; Utah	Tom Mancini; Utah
Men's 7.5K freestyle details	John Steel Hagenbuch (New Hampshire) Dartmouth	Joe Davies; Utah	Will Koch; Colorado (H)
Men's slalom details	Filip Wahlqvist; Colorado (H)	Oscar Zimmer (New Hampshire) Dartmouth	Mikkel Solbakken; Utah
Men's slalom details	Filip Wahlqvist; Colorado (H)	Oscar Zimmer (New Hampshire) Dartmouth	Christian Soevik (Colorado) Denver (H)
Men's 20K classic details	Magnus Boe; Colorado (H)	Florian Knopf (Colorado) Denver (H)	Will Koch; Colorado (H)
Men's 20K classic details	Magnus Boe; Colorado (H)	Florian Knopf (Colorado) Denver (H)	Remi Drolet (Massachusetts) Harvard
