= 2018 NCAA Skiing Championships =

American college skiing competition

2018 NCAA Skiing tournament
- Teams: 23
- Format: Duration scoring
- Finals site: (Colorado) Steamboat Springs, Colorado; Steamboat Ski Resort
- Champions: Denver Pioneers (24th title)
- Runner-up: Colorado Buffaloes (31st title game)
- Semifinalists: Dartmouth Big Green; Utah Utes
- Winning coach: Andy LeRoy (6th title)
- MVP: Amelia Smart ((Denver))
- Television: NCAA

The 2018 NCAA Skiing Championships took place from March 7 to March 10 in Steamboat Springs, Colorado, at the Steamboat Ski Resort. The tournament went into its 65th consecutive NCAA Skiing Championships, and featured twenty-three teams across all divisions.

== Team results ==
- Note: Top 10 only
- (H): Team from hosting U.S. state

Rank	Team	Points
1st place, gold medalist(s)	Denver (H)	604
2nd place, silver medalist(s)	Colorado (H)	563
3rd place, bronze medalist(s)	Dartmouth	448 1/2
4	Utah	385 1/2
5	Vermont	330
6	Montana State	293
7	New Mexico	277
8	Middlebury	248
9	Alaska Anchorage	194
10	Northern Michigan	179

== Individual results ==
- Note: Table does not include consolation
- (H): Individual from hosting U.S. State

Games	First	Second	Third
Women's giant slalom details	Amelia Smart (Colorado) Denver (H)	Katharine Irwin; New Mexico	Paula Moltzan; Vermont
Women's giant slalom details	Amelia Smart (Colorado) Denver (H)	Katharine Irwin; New Mexico	Ann-Kathrin Breuning; Utah
Women's 5K classical details	Katharine Ogden (New Hampshire) Dartmouth	Anne Siri Lervik; Colorado (H)	Hailey Swirbul; Alaska Anchorage
Women's 5K classical details	Katharine Ogden (New Hampshire) Dartmouth	Anne Siri Lervik; Colorado (H)	Guro Jordheim; Utah
Women's slalom details	Amelia Smart (Colorado) Denver (H)	Paula Moltzan; Vermont	Francesca English; Vermont
Women's slalom details	Amelia Smart (Colorado) Denver (H)	Paula Moltzan; Vermont	Andrea Komsic (Colorado) Denver (H)
Women's 15K freestyle details	Katharine Ogden (New Hampshire) Dartmouth	Hailey Swirbul; Alaska Anchorage	Linn Eriksen (Colorado) Denver (H)
Women's 15K freestyle details	Katharine Ogden (New Hampshire) Dartmouth	Hailey Swirbul; Alaska Anchorage	Guro Jordheim; Utah
Men's giant slalom details	Brian McLaughlin (New Hampshire) Dartmouth	Tanguy Nef (New Hampshire) Dartmouth	Ola Johansen; Colorado (H)
Men's giant slalom details	Brian McLaughlin (New Hampshire) Dartmouth	Tanguy Nef (New Hampshire) Dartmouth	Max Roeisland; Vermont
Men's 10K classical details	Martin Bergstrom; Utah	Petter Reistad; Colorado (H)	Dag Frode Trolleboe (Colorado) Denver (H)
Men's 10K classical details	Martin Bergstrom; Utah	Petter Reistad; Colorado (H)	Eivind Kvaale (Colorado) Denver (H)
Men's slalom details	Tanguy Nef (New Hampshire) Dartmouth	Sandy Vietze; Vermont	Tobias Kogler (Colorado) Denver (H)
Men's slalom details	Tanguy Nef (New Hampshire) Dartmouth	Sandy Vietze; Vermont	Erik Arvidsson (Vermont) Middlebury
Men's 20K freestyle details	Ian Torchia; Northern Michigan	Alvar Alev; Colorado (H)	Eivind Kvaale (Colorado) Denver (H)
Men's 20K freestyle details	Ian Torchia; Northern Michigan	Alvar Alev; Colorado (H)	Dag Frode Trolleboe (Colorado) Denver (H)
