= 1979 NCAA Skiing Championships =

American college skiing competition

Tournament information
- Sport: College skiing
- Location: Steamboat Springs, Colorado
- Administrator: NCAA
- Host(s): University of Colorado Boulder
- Venue(s): Steamboat Ski Resort
- Teams: 13

Final positions
- Champions: Colorado (10th title)
- 1st runners-up: Utah
- 2nd runners-up: Vermont

The 1979 NCAA Skiing Championships were contested at the Steamboat Ski Resort on Mount Werner near Steamboat Springs, Colorado, at the 26th annual NCAA-sanctioned ski tournament to determine the individual and team national champions of men's collegiate alpine, cross-country skiing, and ski jumping in the United States.

Seven-time defending champions Colorado, coached by Tim Hinderman, once again claimed the team national championship, finishing 23 points ahead of Utah in the standings. This was the tenth title for the Buffaloes.

== Venue ==
1979 NCAA Skiing Championships site

This year's NCAA skiing championships were contested at the Steamboat Ski Resort at Mount Werner in Steamboat Springs, Colorado.

These were the eighth championships held in the state of Colorado (1956, 1959, 1966, 1968, 1969, 1972, 1975, and 1977) and the third at Steamboat Springs (1968 and 1969).

== Team scoring ==
Rank	Team	Points
1st place, gold medalist(s)	Colorado (H)	153
2nd place, silver medalist(s)	Utah	130
3rd place, bronze medalist(s)	Vermont	123
4	Wyoming	99
5	Dartmouth	74
6	Middlebury	62
7	Northern Michigan	60
8	Montana State	35
9	New Hampshire	33
10	Williams	19
11	New Mexico	10
12	Michigan Tech	9
13	Minnesota–Duluth	3

== See also ==
- List of NCAA skiing programs
