= 1993 NCAA Skiing Championships =

American college skiing competition

Tournament information
- Sport: College skiing
- Location: Steamboat Springs, Colorado
- Administrator: NCAA
- Venue(s): Steamboat Ski Resort
- Teams: 20
- Number of events: 8

Final positions
- Champions: Utah (7th overall, 6th co-ed)
- 1st runners-up: Vermont
- 2nd runners-up: New Mexico

The 1993 NCAA Skiing Championships were contested at the Steamboat Ski Resort on Mount Werner near Steamboat Springs, Colorado, as the 39th annual NCAA-sanctioned ski tournament to determine the individual and team national champions of men's and women's collegiate slalom and cross-country skiing in the United States.

Utah, coached by Pat Miller, won the team championship, their seventh overall and sixth as a co-ed team.

== Venue ==
This year's NCAA skiing championships were contested at the Steamboat Ski Resort at Mount Werner in Steamboat Springs, Colorado.

These were the ninth championships held in the state of Colorado and the fourth at Steamboat Springs (previously 1968, 1969 and 1979).

== Program ==
=== Men's events ===
- Cross country, 10 kilometer classical
- Cross country, 20 kilometer freestyle
- Slalom
- Giant slalom

=== Women's events ===
- Cross country, 5 kilometer classical
- Cross country, 15 kilometer freestyle
- Slalom
- Giant slalom

== Team scoring ==
Championships site

Rank	Team	Points
1st place, gold medalist(s)	Utah	783
2nd place, silver medalist(s)	Vermont (DC)	700 1/2
3rd place, bronze medalist(s)	New Mexico	685
4	Colorado	628
5	Alaska Anchorage	543
6	Dartmouth	508 1/2
7	Williams	379
8	Middlebury	326
9	Western State (CO)	321
10	New Hampshire	312
11	Northern Michigan	246
12	Denver	197
13	Bates	134
14	St. Lawrence	107
15	Colby	64
16	Alaska Fairbanks	51
17	Michigan Tech	35
18	Massachusetts	34
19	Wisconsin–Green Bay	28
20	Saint Mary's (MN)	11

- DC – Defending champions

== See also ==
- List of NCAA skiing programs
