= 2006 NCAA Skiing Championships =

American college skiing competition

Tournament information
- Sport: College skiing
- Location: Steamboat Springs, Colorado
- Administrator: NCAA
- Host: University of Colorado Boulder
- Venue: Steamboat Ski Resort
- Teams: 24
- Number of events: 8

Final positions
- Champions: Colorado (16th overall, 5th co-ed)
- 1st runners-up: New Mexico
- 2nd runners-up: Dartmouth

The 2006 NCAA Skiing Championships were contested at the Steamboat Ski Resort on Mount Werner near Steamboat Springs, Colorado as part of the 53rd annual NCAA-sanctioned ski tournament to determine the individual and team national champions of men's and women's collegiate slalom and cross-country skiing in the United States.

Hosts Colorado, coached by Richard Rokos, won the team championship, the Buffaloes' fifth co-ed title and sixteenth overall.

== Venue ==
This year's NCAA skiing championships were contested at the Steamboat Ski Resort at Mount Werner in Steamboat Springs, Colorado.

== Program ==
=== Men's events ===
- Cross country, 20 kilometer freestyle
- Cross country, 10 kilometer classical
- Slalom
- Giant slalom

=== Women's events ===
- Cross country, 15 kilometer freestyle
- Cross country, 5 kilometer classical
- Slalom
- Giant slalom

== Team scoring ==
Championships site

Rank	Team	Points
1st place, gold medalist(s)	Colorado	654
2nd place, silver medalist(s)	New Mexico	556
3rd place, bronze medalist(s)	Dartmouth	537 1/2
4	Denver (DC)	522 1/2
5	Vermont	516
6	Alaska Anchorage	451
7	Middlebury	412
8	Utah	400
9	New Hampshire	309
10	Alaska Fairbanks	271
11	Nevada	280
12	Bates	189
13	Montana State	185
14	Northern Michigan	154
15	Williams	137 1/2
16	Colby	130 1/2
17	Western State	126 1/2
18	Whitman	62 1/2
19	Michigan Tech	62
20	Boise State	50
21	St. Lawrence	25
22	Wisconsin Green Bay	22
23	St. Olaf	17
24	Gustavus Adolphus	9

- DC – Defending champions
- Debut team appearance

== See also ==
- List of NCAA skiing programs
