= 2026 NCAA Skiing Championships =

American college skiing competition

2026 NCAA Skiing tournament
- Teams: 22
- Format: Duration scoring
- Finals site: Park City and Midway, Utah
- Champions: Utah Utes (17th title)
- Runner-up: Colorado Buffaloes
- Semifinalists: Denver Pioneers; Montana State
- Television: NCAA

The 2026 NCAA Skiing Championships took place from March 11 to March 14 in Utah, at Soldier Hollow Nordic Center, which hosted the cross-country events, and Utah Olympic Park, which hosted the alpine events. The tournament went into its 72nd consecutive NCAA Skiing Championships, and featured twenty-two teams across all divisions.

== Team results ==
- Note: Top 10 only
- (H): Team from hosting U.S. state

Rank	Team	Points
1st place, gold medalist(s)	Utah (H)	549.5
2nd place, silver medalist(s)	Colorado	539
3rd place, bronze medalist(s)	Denver	386.5
4	Montana State	376.5
5	Vermont	334
6	Dartmouth	214
7	Middlebury	254
8	Alaska	235
9	New Hampshire	210.5
10	Alaska Fairbanks	205.5

== Individual Results ==
- Note: Table does not include consolation
- (H): Individual from hosting U.S. State

Games	First	Second	Third
Women's giant slalom details	Justine Lamontagne; Montana State	Louison Accambray; Colorado	Mia Hunt (Colorado) Denver
Women's giant slalom details	Justine Lamontagne; Montana State	Louison Accambray; Colorado	Guro Hestad Vognild (Utah) Westminster (H)
Women's 7.5K classic details	Rosie Fordham; Alaska Fairbanks	Erica Laven; Utah (H)	Synne Bollingmo (Colorado) Denver
Women's 7.5K classic details	Rosie Fordham; Alaska Fairbanks	Erica Laven; Utah (H)	Tilde Baangman; Colorado
Women's slalom details	Justine Lamontagne; Montana State	Mia Hunt (Colorado) Denver	Louison Accambray; Colorado
Women's slalom details	Justine Lamontagne; Montana State	Mia Hunt (Colorado) Denver	Tea Kiesel; Montana State
Women's 20K freestyle details	Rosie Fordham; Alaska Fairbanks	Haley Brewster; Vermont	Erica Laven; Utah (H)
Women's 20K freestyle details	Rosie Fordham; Alaska Fairbanks	Haley Brewster; Vermont	Ava Thurston (New Hampshire) Dartmouth
Men's giant slalom details	Johs Herland; Utah (H)	Feb Allasina; Colorado	Nick Unkovskoy (Vermont) Middlebury
Men's giant slalom details	Johs Herland; Utah (H)	Feb Allasina; Colorado	Townsend Mikell (Maine) Colby
Men's 7.5K classic details	John Steel Hagenbuch (New Hampshire) Dartmouth	Mons Melbye; Utah (H)	Erling Bjoernstad; Alaska
Men's 7.5K classic details	John Steel Hagenbuch (New Hampshire) Dartmouth	Mons Melbye; Utah (H)	Storm Pedersen; Colorado
Men's slalom details	Oscar Zimmer (New Hampshire) Dartmouth	Julian Arthur (Vermont) Middlebury	Johs Herland; Utah (H)
Men's slalom details	Oscar Zimmer (New Hampshire) Dartmouth	Julian Arthur (Vermont) Middlebury	Pierick Charest; Utah (H)
Men's 20K freestyle details	Mons Melbye; Utah (H)	John Steel Hagenbuch (New Hampshire) Dartmouth	Tabor Greenberg; Vermont
Men's 20K freestyle details	Mons Melbye; Utah (H)	John Steel Hagenbuch (New Hampshire) Dartmouth	Jakob Moch; Colorado
