= 2025 NCAA Skiing Championships =

American college skiing competition

2025 NCAA Skiing tournament
- Teams: 23
- Format: Duration scoring
- Finals site: Hanover and Lyme Center, New Hampshire
- Champions: Utah Utes (16th title)
- Runner-up: Colorado Buffaloes
- Semifinalists: Dartmouth Big Green; Denver Pioneers
- Television: NCAA

The 2025 NCAA Skiing Championships took place from March 5 to March 8 in New Hampshire, at Oak Hill Outdoor Center, which hosted the cross-country events, and Dartmouth Skiway, which hosted the alpine events. The tournament went into its 71st consecutive NCAA Skiing Championships, and featured twenty-three teams across all divisions.

== Team results ==
- Note: Top 10 only
- (H): Team from hosting U.S. state

Rank	Team	Points
1st place, gold medalist(s)	Utah	590
2nd place, silver medalist(s)	Colorado	513
3rd place, bronze medalist(s)	Dartmouth (H)	508.5
4	Denver	384
5	Vermont	368
6	Middlebury	252.5
7	Alaska Anchorage	251
8	Montana State	234
9	New Hampshire (H)	208
10	Alaska Fairbanks	176

== Individual Results ==
- Note: Table does not include consolation
- (H): Individual from hosting U.S. State

Games	First	Second	Third
Women's giant slalom details	Sara Rask (Colorado) Denver	Justine Lamontagne; Montana State	Hanna Larsson Nathhorst; Vermont
Women's giant slalom details	Sara Rask (Colorado) Denver	Justine Lamontagne; Montana State	Carmen Nielssen; Alaska Anchorage
Women's 7.5K classic details	Erica Laven; Utah	Annie McColgan; Vermont	Jasmine Drolet (New Hampshire) Dartmouth (H)
Women's 7.5K classic details	Erica Laven; Utah	Annie McColgan; Vermont	Ava Thurston (New Hampshire) Dartmouth (H)
Women's slalom details	Sara Rask (Colorado) Denver	Justine Clement; Vermont	Magdalena Luczak; Colorado
Women's slalom details	Sara Rask (Colorado) Denver	Justine Clement; Vermont	Justine Lamontagne; Montana State
Women's 20K freestyle details	Kendall Kramer; Alaska Fairbanks	Erica Laven; Utah	Tilde Baangman; Colorado
Women's 20K freestyle details	Kendall Kramer; Alaska Fairbanks	Erica Laven; Utah	Lea Wenaas (Colorado) Denver
Men's giant slalom details	Johs Herland; Utah	Benny Brown (New Hampshire) Dartmouth (H)	Filip Wahlqvist; Colorado
Men's giant slalom details	Johs Herland; Utah	Benny Brown (New Hampshire) Dartmouth (H)	Bradshaw Underhill (Vermont) Middlebury
Men's 7.5K classic details	John Steel Hagenbuch (New Hampshire) Dartmouth (H)	Finn Sweet; Vermont	Joe Davies; Utah
Men's 7.5K classic details	John Steel Hagenbuch (New Hampshire) Dartmouth (H)	Finn Sweet; Vermont	Luke Allan (New Hampshire) Dartmouth (H)
Men's slalom details	Jayden Buckrell; New Hampshire (H)	Filip Wahlqvist; Colorado	Bode Flanigan (Massachusetts) Boston College
Men's slalom details	Jayden Buckrell; New Hampshire (H)	Filip Wahlqvist; Colorado	Oscar Zimmer (New Hampshire) Dartmouth (H)
Men's 20K freestyle details	Joe Davies; Utah	John Steel Hagenbuch (New Hampshire) Dartmouth (H)	Brian Bushey; Utah
Men's 20K freestyle details	Joe Davies; Utah	John Steel Hagenbuch (New Hampshire) Dartmouth (H)	Benjamin Dohlby; Alaska Fairbanks
