= Steamboat Ski Resort =

Ski area in Colorado, United States

Steamboat Resort

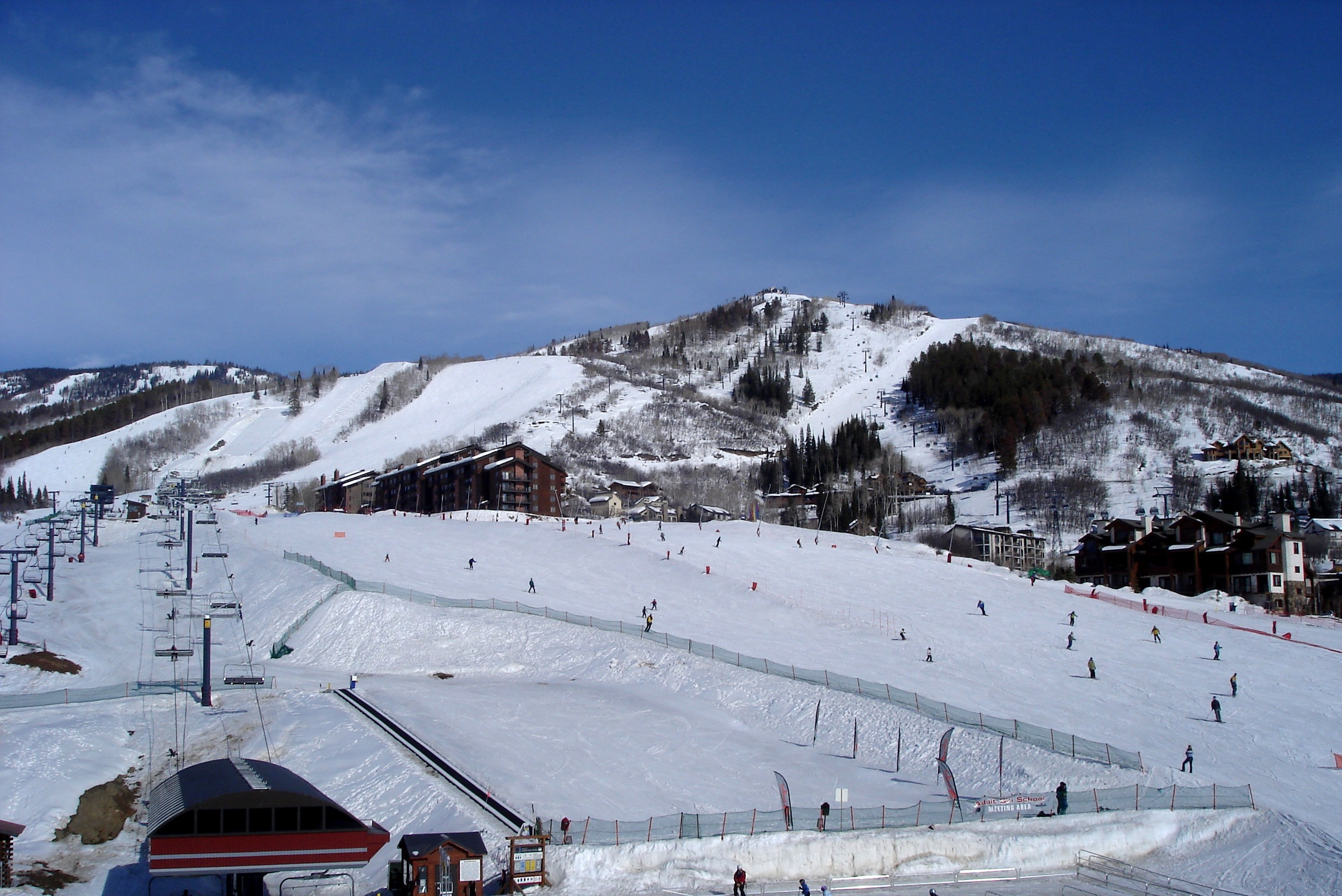
- Base of the mountain in 2008

- Location in the United States Location in Colorado
- Location: Routt County, Colorado, United States.
- Nearest city: Steamboat Springs
- Coordinates: 40.459°N 106.803°W
- Status: Operating
- Owner: Alterra Mountain Company
- Vertical: 3,668 feet (1,118 m)
- Top elevation: 10,568 feet (3,221 m)
- Base elevation: 6,900 feet (2,103 m)
- Skiable area: 3,741 acres (15.1 km^{2})
- Trails: 170 total: 14% beginner; 42% intermediate; 44% advanced
- Longest run: "Why Not" ~ 3 miles (5 km)
- Lift system: 24 total: 3 gondolas, 1 high-speed six-pack, 8 high-speed quad chairs, 4 triple chairs, 2 double chairs, 6 surface lifts
- Terrain parks: Yes, 6
- Snowfall: 400 inches (33.3 ft; 10.2 m)
- Night skiing: Yes
- Website: steamboat.com

Steamboat Resort is a major ski area in the Western United States, located in northwestern Colorado at Steamboat Springs. Operated by the Steamboat Ski & Resort Corporation, it is located on Mount Werner, a mountain in the Park Range in the Routt National Forest. Originally named Storm Mountain ski area, it opened on January 12, 1963.

The ski area has 297 named trails spread over 2,965 acres (4.6 sq mi; 12.0 km^{2}). Of those, 14% are classified as beginner-level, 42% as intermediate, and 44% as advanced. It also contains the Mavericks Superpipe, one of the premier half-pipes in North America. Limited trails available for night skiing began to be offered in the 2013–14 season.

In honor of local Olympian Buddy Werner (1936–1964), Storm Mountain was renamed Mount Werner in 1965, and the ski area's name was changed as well. Dallas-based conglomerate LTV purchased Mount Werner ski area in the fall of 1969, rebranded it as "Steamboat" the following summer, and hired world champion and Olympic silver medalist Billy Kidd as director of skiing.

== Ownership ==
In 2017, Steamboat Ski Resort was purchased by Alterra Mountain Company from Intrawest, a Canadian resort management company. Steamboat was one of the seven resorts owned by Intrawest. Prior to Intrawest's ownership, Steamboat was owned by the American Skiing Company. Intrawest purchased the resort at the end of the 2006–07 season.

== Mountain statistics ==
=== Elevation ===
- Base: 6,900 feet (2,103 m)
- Summit: 10,568 feet (3,221 m)
- Vertical Rise: 3,668 feet (1,118 m)

=== Trails ===
- Area: 3,741 acres (5.8 mi^{2}; 15.1 km^{2})
- Trails: 182 total (~12% beginner, 40% intermediate, 48% advanced)
- Longest Run: "Why Not" ~ 3 miles (5 km)
- Terrain Parks: 6 (including Mavericks Superpipe)
- Average Annual Snowfall: 400 inches (33.3 ft; 10.2 m)

The four lower mountain lifts (the Steamboat Gondola, the lower portion of the Wild Blue Gondola, Thunderhead Express, and Christie Peak Express) service most of the green runs, which include the long Why Not trail from Thunderhead. Blue trails can be found mostly off of these same lifts, plus the two high speed quads on Sunshine Peak, although more funnel to the Sunshine Express lift. A couple of blue runs can also be found from the Four Points, BAR-UE, and Storm Peak Express lifts, as are a few in Morningside Park.

The blue-black runs are scattered about the mountain, but most of them are located off the Pony Express lift in Pioneer Ridge. Black runs can be found off of all eight high-speed quads except Greenhorn Ranch Express, the highest concentrations are on north Sunshine Peak, most of Storm Peak, Pioneer Ridge, and Morningside Park. The double-black runs are only located directly around the peak of Mt. Werner and in Fish Creek Canyon off of Mahogany Ridge Express.

=== Slope Aspects ===
- North: 20%
- South: 23%
- West: 55%
- East: 2%

=== Lifts ===
- Steamboat has 18 lifts, with 5 Magic Carpets.

Name	Type	Manufacturer	Built	Vertical (feet)	Length (feet)	Notes
Wild Blue Gondola	Gondola10	Doppelmayr	2022 (stage 1); 2023 (stage 2)	590 (stage 1); 2782 (stage 2)	4267 (stage 1); 12243 (stage 2)	Two-stage gondola running from the base area to the summit of Sunshine Peak, with a midway turn station serving the Greenhorn Ranch. Constructed over a two year period, the lower stage opened in 2022 and the upper stage opened in 2023.
Steamboat Gondola	Gondola 8	Doppelmayr	2019	2176	8849	Replaced an older Doppelmayr gondola that was built in 1985. Bottom terminal was moved uphill in 2021 to make room for Wild Blue.
Christie Peak Express	High speed six pack	Leitner-Poma	2007	1102	4636	Has a mid-unload turn station, and is open for night skiing. Lower segment was realigned in 2022 to make room for Wild Blue Gondola Stage I.
Storm Peak Express	High Speed Quad	Doppelmayr	1992	2159	6885	Former bubble lift
Sundown Express	High Speed Quad	Doppelmayr	1992	1936	5418	Former bubble lift. Provides access to "Shadows" off skiers right. Shadows is widely renowned as the most difficult glade skiing in the continental United States
Thunderhead Express	High Speed Quad	Doppelmayr	1997	1641	5530	
Pony Express	High Speed Quad	Garaventa CTEC	1998	1653	5003	
Sunshine Express	High Speed Quad	Poma	2006	1280	5647	Operated from 1997 to 2006 as the Tombstone Express at Canyons Resort
Elkhead Express	High Speed Quad	Doppelmayr	2016	726	2411	
Greenhorn Ranch Express	High speed quad	Doppelmayr	2022	230	1206	Learning lift, with auto-locking safety bars
Mahogany Ridge Express	High speed quad	Leitner-Poma	2023	1868	6329	
South Peak	Triple	Yan	1984	305	1700	Retrofitted with Doppelmayr chairs from the former Sunshine triple
Four Points	Triple	Yan	1992	1365	3986	
Morningside	Triple	Garaventa CTEC	1996	545	2685	Main lift outside of the Morningside bowl.
Burgess Creek	Triple	Leitner-Poma	2004	939	3490	
Bashor	Double	Yan	1974	305	1505	Oldest lift on the mountain, and dedicated terrain park and race training lift.
Bar-UE	Double	Yan	1977	1352	4820	
Wildhorse Gondola	Pulse Gondola 6	Leitner-Poma	2009	104	1942	Does not serve any skiable terrain, built to connect Wildhorse Meadows (Housing development) to the base area.

According to steamboat.com, plans are in the works to place a high-speed six-pack along the Thunderhead lift line.

The $15 million gondola replacement project lasted through the summer of 2019. Some of the helicopter-enabled tower replacements were streamed online, and the lift was extensively tested under load. It opened with fanfare on November 23, 2019, at the start of the winter 2019-2020 season, but broke the next day on November 24, when a main driveshaft sheared (possibly due to unexpected stress during transit from Austria). The manufacturer (Doppelmayr) sent a team from Austria to help with the situation, and the Steamboat lift Ops worked together around the clock to build, ship, and install the replacement part(s). The gondola reopened on December 5, almost 12 days later.

== NCAA Championships ==
Steamboat has hosted the NCAA Skiing Championships nine times (1968, 1969, 1979, 1993, 2006, 2010, 2016, 2018, 2024).

== Full Steam Ahead ==
The $220 million Steamboat improvement project "Full Steam Ahead" constructed new amenities, lifts, and terrain to better the resort experience for skiers and riders.

=== Phase I ===
In June 2021, the first phase of the mountain project "Full Steam Ahead" broke ground with the removal of the Steamboat Gondola building and slight improvements of the base including escalators, moving the gondola terminal closer to the mountain, and a new ski lessons building for small children.

=== Phase II ===
Beginning in summer of 2022, phase II marked the complete redesign of the base area. Construction began on an ice skating rink and restaurant to dramatically improve the feel and flow of the base area. Also, the Greenhorn Ranch learning area and the first segment of the heavily anticipated Wild Blue Gondola were built, providing swift and direct transport for beginners to a dedicated, low-mountain learning area.

=== Phase III ===
The final phase of Full Steam Ahead focused solely on the on-mountain experience for the 2023-2024 ski season. Snowmaking was added on Sunshine Peak, alongside the completion of phase II of the Wild Blue Gondola to create a one-seat ride from the base area to the summit of Sunshine Peak. In addition, a 650 acre terrain expansion was opened on Mahogany Ridge and Fish Creek Canyon, serviced by a high speed quad. Full Steam Ahead concluded on January 15, 2024 with the complete opening of the Fish Creek Canyon area.
