= 2019 NCAA Skiing Championships =

American college skiing competition

2019 NCAA Skiing tournament
- Teams: 24
- Format: Duration scoring
- Finals site: Stowe, Vermont
- Champions: Utah Utes (12th title)
- Runner-up: Vermont Catamounts
- Semifinalists: Colorado Buffaloes; Dartmouth Big Green
- Television: NCAA

The 2019 NCAA Skiing Championships took place from March 6 to March 9 in Vermont, at the Trapp Family Lodge, which hosted the cross-country events, and the Stowe Mountain Resort, which hosted the alpine events. The tournament went into its 66th consecutive NCAA Skiing Championships, and featured twenty-four teams across all divisions.

== Team results ==
- Note: Top 10 only
- (H): Team from hosting U.S. state

Rank	Team	Points
1st place, gold medalist(s)	Utah	530.5
2nd place, silver medalist(s)	Vermont	476
3rd place, bronze medalist(s)	Colorado	455
4	Dartmouth	447
5	Denver	409
6	New Mexico	330
7	Northern Michigan	206
8	Alaska Anchorage	204
9	Montana State	184.5
10	Middlebury	150

== Individual Results ==
- Note: Table does not include consolation
- (H): Individual from hosting U.S. State

Games	First	Second	Third
Women's giant slalom details	Laurence St. Germain; Vermont (H)	Roni Remme; Utah	Patricia Mangan (New Hampshire) Dartmouth
Women's giant slalom details	Laurence St. Germain; Vermont (H)	Roni Remme; Utah	Mikaela Tommy; Colorado
Women's 5K freestyle details	Julia Richter; Utah	Jasmi Joensuu (Colorado) Denver	Evelina Sutro; Vermont (H)
Women's 5K freestyle details	Julia Richter; Utah	Jasmi Joensuu (Colorado) Denver	Katharine Ogden (New Hampshire) Dartmouth
Women's slalom details	Laurence St. Germain; Vermont (H)	Roni Remme; Utah	Mikaela Tommy; Colorado
Women's slalom details	Laurence St. Germain; Vermont (H)	Roni Remme; Utah	Amelia Smart (Colorado) Denver
Women's 15K classical details	Katharine Ogden (New Hampshire) Dartmouth	Julia Richter; Utah	Hedda Baangman; Colorado
Women's 15K classical details	Katharine Ogden (New Hampshire) Dartmouth	Julia Richter; Utah	Guro Jordheim; Utah
Men's giant slalom details	Tanguy Nef (New Hampshire) Dartmouth	Simon Fournier; Colorado	James Ferri (New Hampshire) Dartmouth
Men's giant slalom details	Tanguy Nef (New Hampshire) Dartmouth	Simon Fournier; Colorado	Drew Duffy (New Hampshire) Dartmouth
Men's 10K freestyle details	Erik Dengerud; Colorado	Kornelius Grov; New Mexico	Ian Torchia; Northern Michigan
Men's 10K freestyle details	Erik Dengerud; Colorado	Kornelius Grov; New Mexico	Ricardo Izquierdo-Bernier; New Mexico
Men's slalom details	Jett Seymour (Colorado) Denver	Liam Wallace; Alaska Anchorage	Vegard Busengdal; New Mexico
Men's slalom details	Jett Seymour (Colorado) Denver	Liam Wallace; Alaska Anchorage	Guillaume Grand (Vermont) Saint Michael's (H)
Men's 20K classical details	Ricardo Izquierdo-Bernier; New Mexico	Sigurd Roenning; Alaska	Maximilian Bie; Utah
Men's 20K classical details	Ricardo Izquierdo-Bernier; New Mexico	Sigurd Roenning; Alaska	Alvar Alev; Colorado
