= Tanguy Nef =

Swiss alpine skier (born 1996)

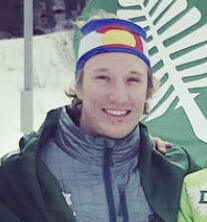
- Nef in 2018

Personal information
- Born: 19 November 1996 (age 30) Geneva, Switzerland
- Website: tanguynef.com

Skiing career
- Country: Switzerland
- Sport: Alpine skiing
- College team: Dartmouth Big Green
- Club: SAS Geneva
- Disciplines: Slalom
- World Cup debut: 18 November 2018 (age 21)

Olympics
- Teams: 1 – (2026)
- Medals: 1 (1 gold)

World Championships
- Teams: 2 – (2019, 2025)
- Medals: 1 (0 gold)

World Cup
- Seasons: 9 – (2019–2027)
- Wins: 0
- Podiums: 1 – (1 SL)
- Overall titles: 0 – (23rd in 2025)
- Discipline titles: 0 – (8th in SL, 2025)
Medal record
Men's alpine skiing
Representing Switzerland
Olympic Games
Gold medal – first place	2026 Milano Cortina	Team combined
World Championships
Silver medal – second place	2025 Saalbach	Team combined

Tanguy Nef (French pronunciation: [tɑ̃ɡi nɛf]; born 19 November 1996) is a Swiss World Cup alpine ski racer who specializes in slalom. He was a member of Swiss Ski's A frame for the 2021–2022 season. He competed at the 2026 Winter Olympics, winning a gold medal in the team combined event.

== Early life and education ==
Nef started skiing at age six on the slopes of the Valais central in French-speaking Switzerland, following in the footsteps of his family members. Son of a Swiss ski teacher, he started competing in alpine ski racing in the cadet/mini category at age seven.

He attended Kollegium Spiritus Sanctus and then moved to the United States to study computer science at Dartmouth College, where he completed a bachelor's degree and was a member of the Beta Alpha Omega fraternity. He was a member of the Dartmouth Ski Team. He competed at the NCAA Skiing Championships in 2018 and 2019.

== Career ==
In 2016, shortly after his first podiums in FIS slalom, Nef competed in his first European Cup events then took part in his first Junior World Championships.

In 2017, he competed in the North American Cup (5 top10, including 3 top5) and participated in the FIS Alpine Junior World Ski Championships in Åre.

Nef had his first continental successes in North American Cup events during the winter of the 2017-2018 season (6 podiums including 2 victories).

The Swiss was promoted to the World Cup for the 2018-2019 season and scored points in his first race at Levi with an 11th place in slalom, followed by a 4th place in the European Cup slalom a few days later. In January 2019, he finished 13th in Zagreb before making it to the top 30 twice in Adelboden and Schladming. He was then selected for the 2019 FIS Alpine World Ski Championships, where he finished 29th in slalom. At the end of the season, he won two giant slalom North American Cups at Burke Mountain.

During the 2019-2020 season, he scored points at Levi and Zagreb once again before securing the top 10 twice in a World Cup race in January 2020, at Madonna di Campiglio and Wengen.

Nef started the 2020-2021 season with the 26th position at Zürs, before succeeding in slalom, finishing 6th at Alta Badia and 18th at Madonna di Campiglio. In January 2021, he finished 6th in the Adelboden slalom which marked his best result of the season. He then finished 10th in Flachau before ending the month with two additional top 30s in Schladming and Chamonix. In March, he finished 10th in the slalom of the World Cup finals in Lenzerheide. He changed ski brand from Fischer to Head during the summer.

During the first slalom of the 2021-2022 season in Val d'Isère, he finished 4th in the initial run before being eliminated at the first gate during the second run. Despite finishing 13th in Adelboden then 24th in Wengen in January, he narrowly missed his selection for the 2022 Beijing Winter Olympics. In February, he secured his first podium in the European Cup in Almåsa. A few days later, he led the first slalom in Garmisch at the end of the first run before being eliminated in the second run. He finished 22nd for the last race of the World Cup season at Flachau.

On 9 February 2026, Nef and Franjo von Allmen won the gold medal in the team combined event at the 2026 Winter Olympics.

== World Cup results ==
=== Season standings ===
Season
Season	Age	Overall	Slalom	Giant slalom	Super-G	Downhill	Combined	Parallel
2019	22	95	32	—	—	—	—	—
2020	23	77	25	—	—	—	—	44
2021	24	53	18	—	—	—	—N/a	26
2022	25	89	32	—	—	—	—N/a	—
2023	26	137	50	—	—	—	—N/a	—N/a
2024	27	89	29	—	—	—	—N/a	—N/a
2025	28	23	8	—	—	—	—N/a	—N/a
2026	29	25	9	—	—	—	—N/a	—N/a
2027	30	7	5	—	—	—	—N/a	—N/a

Standings through 22 November 2026

=== Race podiums ===
- 0 wins
- 1 podium – (1 SL); 23 top tens

Season
Season	Date	Location	Discipline	Place
2027	22 November 2026	Gurgl, Austria	Slalom	3rd

== World Championship results ==
Year
Year	Age	Slalom	Giant slalom	Super-G	Downhill	Combined	Team combined	Team event
2019	22	29	—	—	—	—	—N/a	—
2025	28	9	—	—	—	—N/a	2	—

== Olympic results ==
Year
Year	Age	Slalom	Giant slalom	Super-G	Downhill	Team combined
2026	29	6	—	—	—	1
