= Andy LeRoy =

American alpine skier and coach (born 1975)

Andy LeRoy (born June 24, 1975) is an American former alpine skier and trainer who competed in the 1998 Winter Olympics. From 2003 to 2006, Andy served as an Alpine coach with the Steamboat Springs Winter Sports Club. In 2006, he was named as the head ski coach for the University of Denver During his tenure from 2006 to 2018, he led the Pioneers to six NCAA championships. On March 18, 2021, he was named as the head ski coach for the University of Colorado Boulder, a position he held until January 2023 when he was dismissed after a single season.

He also appeared on season three of The Bachelorette, but failed to receive a rose in the season premier.
