= 1985 NCAA Division I men's golf championship =

1985 NCAA Division I Men's Golf Championship
Tournament information
- Location: Haines City, Florida, U.S. 28.072732°N 81.546020°W
- Course: Grenelefe Country Club

Statistics
- Field: 30 teams

Champion
- Team: Houston (16th title); Individual: Clark Burroughs, Ohio State
- Team: 1,172; Individual: 285

Location map
- Location in the United States Location in Florida

The 1985 NCAA Division I Men's Golf Championships were contested at the 47th annual NCAA-sanctioned golf tournament for determining the individual and team national champions of men's collegiate golf at the Division I level in the United States.

The tournament was held at the Grenelefe Country Club in Haines City, Florida.

Defending champions Houston won the team championship, the Cougars' record sixteenth NCAA title.

Clark Burroughs, from Ohio State, won the individual title.

== Individual results ==
=== Individual champion ===
- Clark Burroughs, Ohio State

== Team results ==
=== Finalists ===
Rank	Team	Score
1	Houston (DC)	1,172
2	Oklahoma State	1,175
3	Florida	1,185
4	Ole Miss	1,186
5	Texas	1,188
6	Arkansas	1,192
7	Georgia	1,193
8	Oklahoma	1,195
9	LSU	1,196
9	Stanford	1,196
11	Arizona State	1,197
12	Georgia Tech	1,201
13	Wake Forest	1,203
14	BYU	1,206
14	UCLA	1,206

=== Missed cut ===
Rank	Team	Score
T16	North Carolina	904
T16	Ohio State	904
T18	Auburn	905
T18	Lamar	905
20	USC	906
21	Fresno State	908
22	Texas A&M	911
23	New Mexico	914
24	San José State	916
25	Oral Roberts	924
26	UTEP	925
27	Clemson	933
28	Hartford	939
29	Temple	941
30	St. John's (NY)	953

- DC = Defending champions
- Debut appearance
