= John Steel Hagenbuch =

American cross-country skier (born 2001)

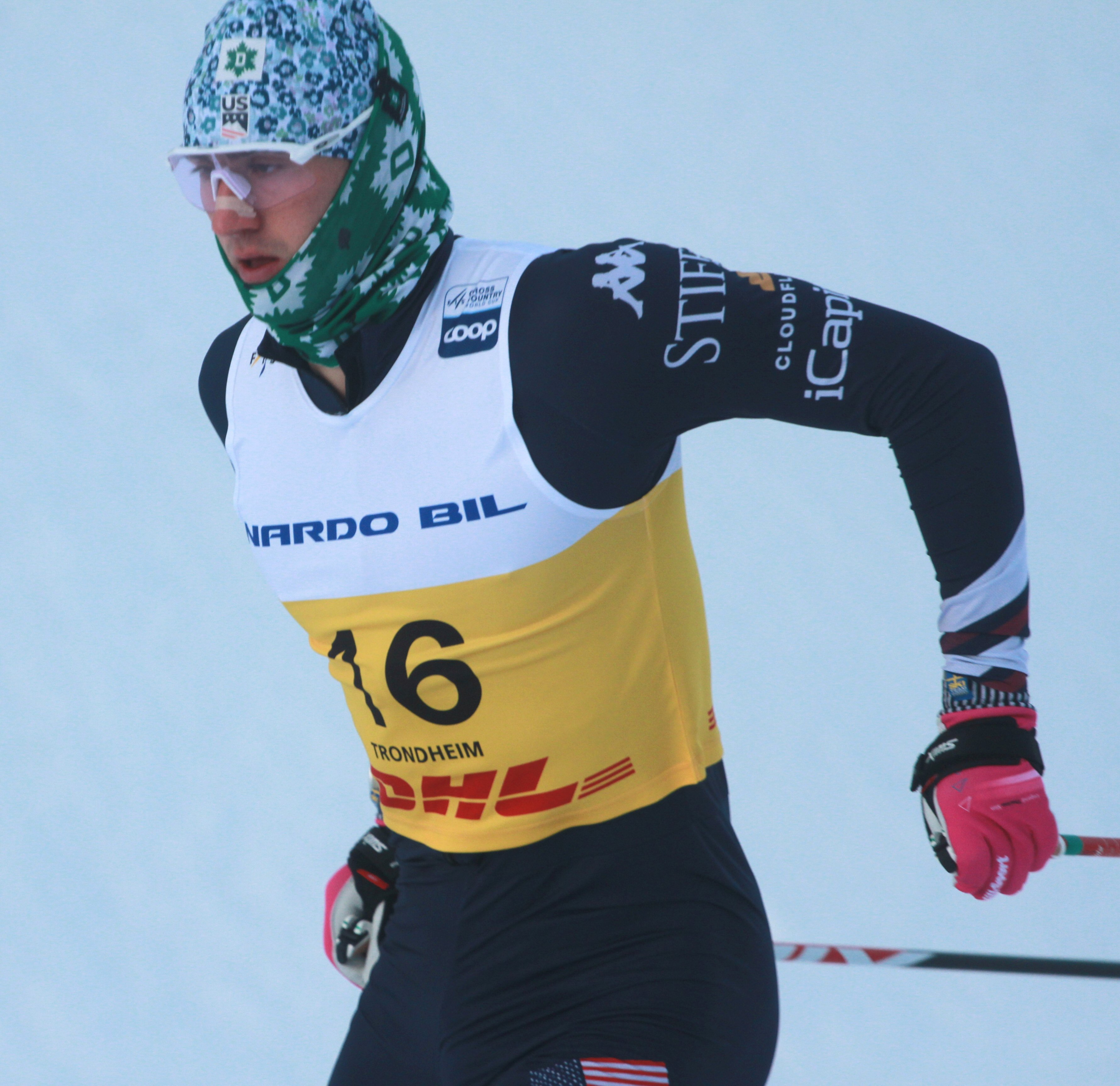
- Hagenbuch in 2025

Personal information
- Born: October 1, 2001 (age 24) San Francisco, California, U.S.

Sport
- Country: United States
- College team: Dartmouth Big Green

John Steel Hagenbuch (born October 1, 2001) is an American cross-country skier. He is representing the United States at the 2026 Winter Olympics.

== Early life and education ==
Hagenbuch was born on October 1, 2001, in San Francisco, California. He grew up in Ketchum, Idaho and went to Sun Valley Community School. His grandfather, John Steel III, played football at Dartmouth College.

He is a student at Dartmouth College, where he is a member of Theta Delta Chi fraternity and a member of the Dartmouth Ski Team.

== Career ==
In January 2026, Hagenbuch made the U.S. Olympic Team as the youngest male cross-country skier.
