= Mount Werner =

Mountain in Colorado, United States

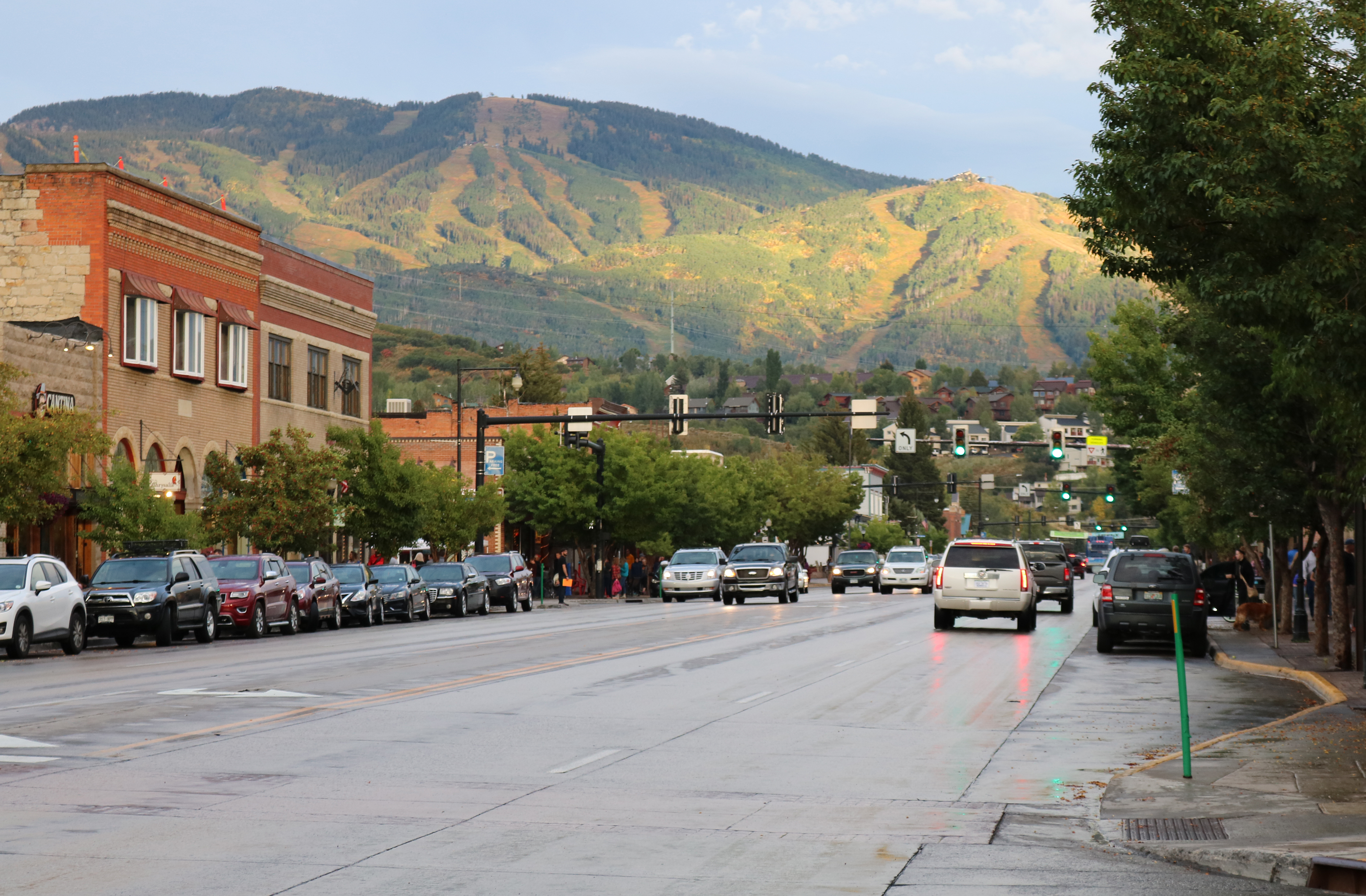
- The mountain viewed from Lincoln Avenue in Steamboat Springs

Highest point
- Elevation: 10,570 ft (3,220 m)
- Isolation: 7.10 mi (11.43 km)
- Coordinates: 40°27′22″N 106°44′25″W

Geography
- Location within Colorado
- Location: Routt County, Colorado, U.S.
- Parent range: Park Range
- Topo map(s): USGS 7.5' topographic map Mount Werner, Colorado

Mount Werner is a mountain summit in the Park Range of the Rocky Mountains of North America. The 10,570-foot (3,222 m) peak is located in Routt National Forest, 4.6 miles (7.4 km) east-southeast (bearing 107°) of the City of Steamboat Springs in Routt County, Colorado, United States. The mountain was renamed in 1964 in honor of skier Buddy Werner.

== Mountain ==
Mount Werner is 150 miles (240 km) northwest of Denver. The mountain reaches a height of 10,570 feet (3,220 m) above sea level and has a base elevation of 6,900 feet (2,100 m), for a vertical rise of 3,670 feet (1,120 m). It has five peaks (from lowest to highest), Christie Peak, Thunderhead Peak, Sunshine Peak, Storm Peak, and Mount Werner.

Formerly known as Storm Mountain, it was renamed in 1965 in honor of Buddy Werner, an Olympian from Steamboat Springs who was killed in an avalanche in Switzerland in April 1964.

Mount Werner stands within the watershed of the Yampa River, which drains into the Green River, the Colorado River, and thence into the Gulf of California in Mexico.

== Steamboat Ski Resort ==
The Steamboat Ski Resort operates on 3,741 acres (15.14 km^{2}) of the mountain. It is serviced by two gondolas--the Steamboat Gondola and the newer Wild Blue Gondola--and several chairlifts. It regularly receives some of the highest levels of snow in Colorado. The most recent ten-year snowfall average was 334 inches (8.5 m) per year. Much of the mountain and the resort are contained within the Routt National Forest.

It is the home mountain of many Olympic ski and snowboard competitors, including Buddy Werner, first-ever U.S. men's Olympic alpine skiing medalists Billy Kidd and Jimmie Heuga, and world champion and Olympic bronze medalist snowboarder Arielle Gold.

== Historical names ==
- Mount Werner – 1964
- Storm Mountain

== See also ==
- List of Colorado mountain ranges
- List of Colorado mountain summits
  - List of Colorado fourteeners
  - List of Colorado 4000 meter prominent summits
  - List of the most prominent summits of Colorado
- List of Colorado county high points
