= NCAA rifle championships =

Annual co-educational rifle national collegiate championship

- Most recent season or competition: 2026 NCAA Rifle Championships
- Association: NCAA
- Sport: College rifle
- Founded: 1980; 46 years ago
- Division: Division I, Division II, and Division III
- No. of teams: 8 teams 48 individual shooters
- Country: United States
- Most recent champions: Team: West Virginia (21); Small-bore: Braden Peiser, Kentucky; Air rifle: Audrey Gognait, Ole Miss
- Most titles: Team: West Virginia (21); Small-bore: West Virginia (13); Air rifle: West Virginia (15)
- Website: NCAA.com

The NCAA rifle championships are contested at an annual competition sponsored by the National Collegiate Athletic Association to help determine the team as well the individual champions of co-educational collegiate rifle among its member programs in the United States. Unlike many NCAA sports, only one National Collegiate championship is held each season with teams from Division I, Division II, and Division III competing together. It has been held in mid-March every single year since 1980, except 2020.

The two-day event includes individual and team titles with team scoring based on the aggregate performances of individual shooters across a set of smallbore and air rifle competitions.

West Virginia has been the most successful program at the team and individual levels; the Mountaineers have won 21 team and 28 individual titles.

The current team national champions are West Virginia, who won their twenty-first team national championship at the 2026 event, which was held at the Covelli Center at Ohio State University in Columbus, Ohio from March 13-14. Braden Peiser of Kentucky won the individual championship for smallbore, while Audrey Gognait of Ole Miss won the individual championship for air rifle.

== Background ==
=== Co-ed status ===
Under the NCAA rules, sports teams that include both men and women are designated as men's teams for purposes of sports sponsorship and scholarship limitations. (Note: While all members of NCAA Divisions I and II are limited to the equivalent of 3.6 full scholarships in rifle per school in any academic year, Division II members are also limited to 60 scholarship equivalents in men's sports apart from football and basketball.) Nonetheless, rifle has been a coed sport since 1980, a year before the NCAA began holding championships in women's sports. Schools sponsoring rifle may field anywhere from one to three teams. If a school chooses to sponsor more than one team, it may have any combination of men's, women's, and coed teams. Two schools field men's and women's teams, and three field women's and coed teams.

=== Programs ===
==== Conferences ====
- Great America Rifle Conference
- Mid-Atlantic Rifle Conference
- Ohio Valley Conference, the only Division I all-sports conference that sponsored rifle before the SoCon added it in 2016–17.
- Patriot Rifle Conference
- Southern Conference; resumed the sport in 2016–17 after a 30-year hiatus.

== Results ==
- Prior to NCAA sponsorship in 1980, a collegiate rifle championship was held yearly by the National Rifle Association.
- From 1980 to 2004, the championship consisted of 120 shots by each competitor in smallbore, and 40 shots per competitor in air rifle. Since 2005, the championship has consisted of 60 shots for both smallbore and air rifle, equaling a total of 120 shots per team member.

NCAA Rifle Championships
Year	Site	Venue / Range	Team Championship				Smallbore		Air Rifle	
Year	Site	Venue / Range	Winner	Points	Runner-up	Points	Winner	Score	Winner	Score
1980; Details	Johnson City, TN	ETSU Athletic Center	Tennessee Tech	6,201	West Virginia	6,150	Rod Fitz-Randolph (Tennessee Tech)	1,176	Rod Fitz-Randolph (Tennessee Tech)	389
1981; Details	West Point, NY	U.S. Military Academy	Tennessee Tech	6,139	West Virginia	6,136	Kurt Fitz-Randolph (Tennessee Tech)	1,173	John Rost (West Virginia)	391
1982; Details	Lexington, VA	Kilbourne Hall	Tennessee Tech	6,138	West Virginia	6,136	Kurt Fitz-Randolph (Tennessee Tech)	1,167	John Rost (West Virginia)	390
1983; Details	Cincinnati, OH	Xavier University Rifle Range	West Virginia	6,166	Tennessee Tech	6,148	David Johnson (West Virginia)	1,175	Ray Slonena (Tennessee Tech)	389
1984; Details	Murray, KY	Pat Spurgin Rifle Range	West Virginia	6,206	ETSU	6,142	Bob Broughton (West Virginia)	1,172	Pat Spurgin (Murray State)	388
1985; Details	West Point, NY	U.S. Military Academy	Murray State	6,150	West Virginia	6,149	Pat Spurgin (Murray State)	1,168	Christian Heller (West Virginia)	387
1986; Details	Annapolis, MD	Bancroft Hall Rifle Range	West Virginia	6,229	Murray State	6,163	Mike Anti (West Virginia)	1,167	Marianne Wallace (Murray State)	392
1987; Details	Cincinnati, OH	Xavier University Rifle Range	Murray State	6,205	West Virginia	6,203	Web Wright (West Virginia)	1,174	Rob Harbison (Tennessee–Martin)	392
1988; Details	Lexington, VA	Kilbourne Hall	West Virginia	6,192	Murray State	6,183	Web Wright (West Virginia)	1,168	Deena Wigger (Murray State)	390
1989; Details	Murray, KY	Pat Spurgin Rifle Range	West Virginia	6,234	South Florida	6,180	Deb Sinclair (Alaska)	1,171	Michelle Scarborough (South Florida)	399
1990; Details	Annapolis, MD	Bancroft Hall Rifle Rang	West Virginia	6,205	Navy	6,101	Michelle Scarborough (South Florida)	1,165	Gary Hardy (West Virginia)	393
1991; Details	West Point, NY	U.S. Military Academy	West Virginia	6,171	Alaska	6,110	Soma Dutta (UTEP)	1,171	Ann-Marie Pfiffner (West Virginia)	391
1992; Details	Murray, KY	Pat Spurgin Rifle Range	West Virginia	6,214	Alaska	6,166	Tim Manges (West Virginia)	1,172	Ann-Marie Pfiffner (West Virginia)	390
1993; Details	Lexington, VA	Kilbourne Hall	West Virginia	6,179	Alaska	6,169	Eric Uptagrafft (West Virginia)	1,174	Trevor Gathman (West Virginia)	390
1994; Details	Murray, KY	Pat Spurgin Rifle Range	Alaska	6,196	West Virginia	6,187	Cory Brunetti (Alaska)	1,173	Nancy Napolski (Kentucky)	391
1995; Details	Annapolis, MD	Bancroft Hall Rifle Range	West Virginia	6,241	Air Force	6,187	Oleg Seleznev (Alaska)	1,177	Benjamin Belden (Murray State)	390
1996; Details	US Air Force Academy, CO	Cadet Rifle Range	West Virginia	6,179	Air Force	6,168	Joe Johnson (Navy)	1,170	Trevor Gathman (West Virginia)	394
1997; Details	Murray, KY	Pat Spurgin Rifle Range	West Virginia	6,223	Kentucky	6,175	Marcos Scrivner (West Virginia)	1,176	Marra Hastings (Murray State)	393
1998; Details	Murray, KY	Pat Spurgin Rifle Range	West Virginia	6,214	Alaska	6,211	Karyn Juziuk (Xavier)	1,169	Emily Caruso (Norwich)	393
1999; Details	Northfield, VT	Norwich University Rifle Range	Alaska	6,276	Navy	6,168	Kelly Mansfield (Alaska)	1,185	Kelly Mansfield (Alaska)	396
2000; Details	Lexington, VA	Kilbourne Hall	Alaska	6,285	Xavier	6,156	Nicole Allaire (Nebraska)	1,183	Kelly Mansfield (Alaska)	398
2001; Details	Columbus, OH	Lt. Hugh W. Wylie Range	Alaska	6,283	Kentucky	6,175	Matthew Emmons (Alaska)	1,178	Matthew Emmons (Alaska)	392
2002; Details	Murray, KY	Pat Spurgin Rifle Range	Alaska	6,241	Kentucky	6,209	Matthew Emmons (Alaska)	1,190	Ryan Tanoue (Nevada)	392
2003; Details	West Point, NY	Tronsrue Marksmanship Center	Alaska	6,287	Xavier	6,197	Matthew Emmons (Alaska)	1,191	Jamie Beyerle (Alaska)	395
2004; Details	Murray, KY	Pat Spurgin Rifle Range	Alaska	6,273	Nevada	6,185	Matthew Rawlings (Alaska)	1,179	Morgan Hicks (Murray State)	398
2005; Details	Reno, NV	Nevada Wolf Pack Rifle Range	Army	4,659	Jacksonville State	4,658	Matthew Rawlings (Alaska)	686.5	Beth Tidmore (Memphis)	694.2
2006; Details	US Air Force Academy, CO	Cadet Rifle Range	Alaska	4,682	Nebraska	4,666	Jamie Beyerle (Alaska)	690.5	Kristina Fehlings (Nebraska)	694.0
2007; Details	Fairbanks, AK	E.F. Horton Rifle Range	Alaska	4,662	Army	4,644	Josh Albright (Navy)	679.5	Michael Dickinson (Jacksonville State)	692.2
2008; Details	West Point, NY	Tronsrue Marksmanship Center	Alaska	4,662	Army	4,652	Chris Abalo (Army)	687.6	Patrik Sartz (Alaska)	696.4
2009; Details	Fort Worth, TX	TCU Rifle Range	West Virginia	4,643	Kentucky	4,638	Brian Carstensen (Jacksonville State)	682.2	Jenna Compton (Akron)	691.6
2010; Details	Fort Worth, TX	TCU Rifle Range	TCU	4,675	Alaska	4,653	Sarah Scherer (TCU)	685	Jonathan Hall (Columbus State)	699.9
2011; Details	Fort Benning, GA	US Army Marksmanship Unit	Kentucky	4,700	West Virginia	4,697	Ethan Settlemires (Kentucky)	691.0	Nicco Campriani (West Virginia)	701.0
2012; Details	Columbus, OH	Lt. Hugh W. Wylie Range	TCU	4,676	Kentucky	4,661	Sarah Scherer (TCU)	688.6	Petra Zublasing (West Virginia)	696.2
2013; Details	Columbus, OH	Lt. Hugh W. Wylie Range	West Virginia	4,679	Kentucky	4,670	Petra Zublasing (West Virginia)	598	Petra Zublasing (West Virginia)	701.7
2014; Details	Murray, KY	Pat Spurgin Rifle Range & CFSB Center	West Virginia	4,705	Alaska	4,677	Tim Sherry (Alaska)	452.1	Connor Davis (Kentucky)	205.4
2015; Details	Fairbanks, AK	E.F. Horton Rifle Range	West Virginia	4,702	Alaska	4,700	Rachel Martin (Nebraska)	453.3	Maren Prediger (West Virginia)	205.8
2016; Details	Akron, OH	Stile Athletics Field House	West Virginia	4,703	TCU	4,694	Ginny Thrasher (West Virginia)	461.5	Ginny Thrasher (West Virginia)	208.8
2017; Details	Columbus, OH	French Field House	West Virginia	4,723	TCU	4,706	Morgan Phillips (West Virginia)	464.3	Milica Babic (West Virginia)	208.1
2018; Details	Charleston, SC	McAlister Field House & Inouye Hall	Kentucky	4,717	West Virginia	4,708	Morgan Phillips (West Virginia)	459.4	Henrik Larsen (Kentucky)	249.4
2019; Details	Morgantown, WV	WVU Coliseum	TCU	4,699	West Virginia	4,692	Elizabeth Marsh (TCU)	456.9	Kristen Hemphill (TCU)	248.2
2020	Canceled due to COVID-19									
2021; Details	Columbus, OH	Converse Hall	Kentucky	4,731	TCU	4,722	Mary Tucker (Kentucky)	463.3	Mary Tucker (Kentucky)	249.4
2022; Details	Colorado Springs, CO	Clune Arena	Kentucky	4,739	TCU	4,736	William Shaner (Kentucky)	459.7	Scott Rockett (Air Force)	250.2
2023; Details	Akron, OH	James A. Rhodes Arena	Alaska	4,729	TCU	4,717	Cecilia Ossi (Nebraska)	16-8	Rylan Kissell (Alaska)	17-9
2024; Details	Morgantown, WV	WVU Coliseum	TCU	4,732	West Virginia	4,729	Mary Tucker (West Virginia)	462.0	Gavin Barnick (West Virginia)	251.7
2025; Details	Lexington, KY	Memorial Coliseum	West Virginia	4,738	Kentucky	4,737	Cecelia Ossi (Alaska)	464.7	Audrey Gogniat (Ole Miss)	251.0
2026; Details	Columbus, OH	Covelli Center	West Virginia	4,748	TCU	4,741	Braden Peiser (Kentucky)		Audrey Gogniat (Ole Miss)	

== Champions ==
=== Team titles ===
21, 11, 4, 3, 2, 1

Team	#	Years
West Virginia	21	1983, 1984, 1986, 1988, 1989, 1990, 1991, 1992, 1993, 1995, 1996, 1997, 1998, 2009, 2013, 2014, 2015, 2016, 2017, 2025, 2026
Alaska	11	1994, 1999, 2000, 2001, 2002, 2003, 2004, 2006, 2007, 2008, 2023
Kentucky	4	2011, 2018, 2021, 2022
TCU	4	2010, 2012, 2019, 2024
Tennessee Tech	3	1980, 1981, 1982
Murray State	2	1985, 1987
Army	1	2005

== Appearances by Team ==
Key

- CH National Champion
- RU National Runner-up
- Numbers indicate the placement of the team in that tournament beyond second

School	Conference	#	CH	80	81	82	83	84	85	86	87	88	89	90	91	92	93	94	95	96	97	98	99	00	01	02	03	04	05	06	07	08	09	10	11	12	13	14	15	16	17	18	19	21	22	23	24	25	26
West Virginia	GARC	42	21	RU	RU	RU	CH	CH	RU	CH	RU	CH	CH	CH	CH	CH	CH	RU	CH	CH	CH	CH	3	6	3	7	7					6	CH	3	RU	6	CH	CH	CH	CH	CH	RU	RU	4	6	5	RU	CH	CH
Alaska	PRC	39	11	9								5	6	6	RU	RU	RU	CH	5	5	3	RU	CH	CH	CH	CH	CH	CH	4	CH	CH	CH	4	RU	6	3	4	RU	RU	6	5	6	8	5	3	CH	3	3	8
Kentucky	GARC	31	4															3	3	3	RU	3	6		RU	RU	6	8	6	7	4	5	RU	4	CH	RU	RU	3	6	5	4	CH	5	CH	CH	3	4	RU	4
TCU	PRC	19	4																												5ᴛ	3	5	CH	3	CH	3	6	3	RU	RU	3	CH	RU	RU	RU	CH	6	RU
Tennessee Tech	defunct	15	3	CH	CH	CH	RU	3	4	4	4	4	3	3											7	5	8	7																					
Murray State	OVC	36	2	4	5	5	4	5	CH	RU	CH	RU	5	4	5	3	7	5	4		4	4	4	8	5	4	3	9		5	8			7	5				8	3	3	4	4		7	8		8	
Army	GARC	21	1	7ᴛ	6	6	5	6	5	3	6															9		4	CH	3	RU	RU	6	5	8	4	6	8					6						
Navy	GARC	30	-	6	7	7					5	8		RU		4	6	6	6	4	6	6	RU	5	8	6	9	3	5	4	7	7	7	8	7								7		8		6		6
Air Force	PRC	23	-	10	10								4				3	4	RU	RU	5	7	9	7			10										5		7	4	8	5	3	8	5	7	5	7	
Nebraska	PRC	18	-																					3	6			6	3	RU	5ᴛ	4		6			7	5	4	8	6	8		6		6	8		5
Jacksonville State	Independent	14	-																			5	8	9	9		5		RU	8	3		3		4	7	8	7	5										
Xavier	defunct	11	-											5		5	5			6			7	RU	4	3	RU	5	9																				
Nevada	defunct	8	-																							10	4	RU	8	9		8	8			8													
East Tennessee State	defunct	7	-	3	3	4	3	RU	3	5ᴛ																																							
Ole Miss	GARC	7	-																											6														3	4	4	7	4	3
Eastern Kentucky	defunct	6	-	5	4	3	6	4	6																																								
St. John's	defunct	4	-		8	8						7			6																																		
South Florida	defunct	4	-							5ᴛ	3	3	RU																																				
Norwich	MARC	4	-														4				7		5	4																									
Ohio State	PRC	4	-												3																									7	7	7							
Memphis	GARC	3	-																										7									4						7					
UTEP	PRC	3	-										7																10							5													
Eastern Washington	defunct	2	-				7	7																																									
UT Martin	OVC	2	-						7			6																																					
Georgia Southern	SoCon	2	-																																													5	7
Western Kentucky	defunct	1	-	7ᴛ																																													
Penn State	defunct	1	-		9																																												
NC State	defunct	1	-			9																																											
Washington State	defunct	1	-							7																																							
Canisius	defunct	1	-												4																																		
Coast Guard	defunct	1	-																							8																							

== Individual titles ==
Schools in italics no longer compete in NCAA rifle.

Team	Titles	Smallbore	Air Rifle
West Virginia	28	13 (1983, 1984, 1986, 1987, 1988, 1992, 1993, 1997, 2013, 2016, 2017, 2018, 2024)	15 (1981, 1982, 1985, 1990, 1991, 1992, 1993, 1996, 2011, 2012, 2013, 2015, 2016, 2017, 2024)
Alaska	18	12 (1989, 1994, 1995, 1999, 2001, 2002, 2003, 2004, 2005, 2006, 2014, 2025)	6 (1999, 2000, 2001, 2003, 2008, 2023)
Kentucky	9	4 (2011, 2021, 2022, 2026)	5 (1994, 2014, 2018, 2021)
Murray State	7	1 (1985)	6 (1984, 1986, 1988, 1995, 1997, 2004)
Tennessee Tech	5	3 (1980, 1981, 1982)	2 (1980, 1983)
TCU	4	3 (2010, 2012, 2019)	1 (2019)
Nebraska	4	3 (2000, 2015, 2023)	1 (2006)
Jacksonville State	2	1 (2009)	1 (2007)
Navy	2	2 (1996, 2007)	0
South Florida	2	1 (1990)	1 (1989)
Ole Miss	2	0	2 (2025, 2026)
Air Force	1	0	1 (2022)
Akron	1	0	1 (2009)
Army	1	1 (2008)	0
Columbus State	1	0	1 (2010)
Memphis	1	0	1 (2005)
Nevada	1	0	1 (2002)
Norwich	1	0	1 (1998)
Xavier	1	1 (1998)	0
UT Martin	1	0	1 (1987)
UTEP	1	1 (1991)	0

== See also ==
- Pre-NCAA Intercollegiate Rifle Champions (1905-1979)
- Pre-NCAA Women's Intercollegiate Rifle Champions
