= Nebraska Cornhuskers rifle =

University of Nebraska–Lincoln rifle team

Nebraska Cornhuskers
- Founded: 1998; 28 years ago
- University: University of Nebraska–Lincoln
- Athletic director: Troy Dannen
- Head coach: Richard Clark (3rd season)
- Conference: Patriot Rifle
- Location: Lincoln, Nebraska
- Home arena: BigShots Indoor Range
- Nickname: Cornhuskers
- Colors: Scarlet and cream

NCAA Tournament appearances
- 2000, 2001, 2004, 2005, 2006, 2007, 2008, 2009, 2010, 2012, 2013, 2014, 2015, 2016, 2017, 2018, 2020, 2021, 2023, 2024, 2025, 2026

Conference championships
- 2005, 2006, 2026

The Nebraska Cornhuskers rifle team competes as part of NCAA Division I, representing the University of Nebraska–Lincoln in the Patriot Rifle Conference, the only program at the school that competes in a conference other than the Big Ten. Although the NCAA classifies rifle as a coeducational sport, Nebraska has fielded an all-female team since its establishment in 1998 and is one of twenty-nine NCAA rifle programs.

Nebraska trains at the ten-point indoor firing range located in the John J. Pershing Military and Naval Science Building. NU has reached twenty NCAA championships and produced four individual national champions. The team has been coached by Richard Clark since 2024.

== Conference affiliations ==
- Independent (1998–2004)
- Great America Rifle Conference (2004–2021)
- Patriot Rifle Conference (2021–present)

== Coaches ==
=== Coaching history ===
No.	Coach	Tenure	Overall
1	Karen Anthony	1998–2002	43–25 (.632)
2	Launi Meili	2002–2007	75–29 (.721)
3	Morgan Hicks	2007–2012	53–62 (.461)
4	Stacy Underwood	2012–2014	46–24 (.657)
5	Ashley MacAllister	2014–2019	50–49 (.505)
5	Rachel Martin	2019–2021	20–28 (.417)
6	Mindy Miles	2021–2024	21–22 (.488)
	Liz Schmeltzer (Note: Schmetlzer was hired early in 2024 but departed the program shortly after without coaching any meets.)	2024	No games coached
7	Richard Clark	2024–present	30–7 (.811)

=== Coaching staff ===
Name	Position	First year	Alma mater
Richard Clark	Head coach	2024	Kentucky
Kristen Derting	Assistant coach	2024	Mississippi

== Championships and awards ==
=== Conference championships ===
Regular season

- Great America Rifle: 2006
- Patriot Rifle: 2026

Tournament

- Great America Rifle: 2005, 2006
- Patriot Rifle: 2026

=== Individual awards ===
- National coach of the year: Karen Anthony (2000), Stacy Underwood (2014)
- Conference shooter of the year: Kristina Fehlings (2006)
- Conference coach of the year: Karen Anthony (2000), Stacy Underwood (2014)

=== NCAA champions ===
- Nicole Allaire – 2000 (SB)
- Kristina Fehlings – 2006 (AR)
- Rachel Martin – 2015 (SB)
- Cecelia Ossi – 2023 (SB)

=== First-team All-Americans ===
- Nicole Allaire – 2000 (AR, SB)
- Amanda Trujillo – 2001 (AR)
- Melissa Downsbrough – 2002 (AR)
- Kristina Fehlings – 2004 (AR), 2005 (AR), 2006 (SB)
- Misty Chanek – 2006 (SB)
- Andrea Franzen – 2006 (AR)
- Kirsten Weiss – 2007 (SB)
- Amanda Jeffries – 2009 (AR)
- Denise Martin – 2014 (SB)
- Lauren Phillips – 2014 (SB)
- Cecelia Ossi – 2023 (SB), 2024 (SB)
- Emma Rhode – 2025 (AGG, SB)

== Seasons ==
Regular season champion	Tournament champion	Regular season and tournament champion

Year	Coach	Overall	Conference	Postseason
Independent (1998–2004)
1998–99	Karen Anthony	3–7		
1999–00	Karen Anthony	20–6		NCAA 3rd
2000–01	Karen Anthony	16–6		NCAA 6th
2001–02	Karen Anthony	4–6		
2002–03	Launi Meili	7–5		
2003–04	Launi Meili	10–10		NCAA 6th
Great America Rifle Conference (2004–2021)
2004–05	Launi Meili	21–4	1st	NCAA 3rd
2005–06	Launi Meili	22–1	1st	NCAA 2nd
2006–07	Launi Meili	15–9	3rd	NCAA 5th
2007–08	Morgan Hicks	13–11	4th	NCAA 4th
2008–09	Morgan Hicks	13–9	3rd	NCAA 3rd
2009–10	Morgan Hicks	12–14	3rd	NCAA 6th
2010–11	Morgan Hicks	4–15	6th	
2011–12	Morgan Hicks	11–13	3rd	NCAA 3rd
2012–13	Stacy Underwood	17–15	3rd	NCAA 7th
2013–14	Stacy Underwood	29–9	3rd	NCAA 5th
2014–15	Ashley MacAllister	7–5	3rd	NCAA 4th
2015–16	Ashley MacAllister	8–21	6th	NCAA 8th
2016–17	Ashley MacAllister	13–5	2nd	NCAA 6th
2017–18	Ashley MacAllister	9–8	5th	NCAA 8th
2018–19	Ashley MacAllister	13–10	2nd	
2019–20	Rachel Martin	13–11	4th	NCAA (Note: Nebraska qualified for the 2020 NCAA Rifle Championship before it was canceled due to the COVID-19 pandemic)
2021	Rachel Martin	7–17	8th	NCAA 6th
Patriot Rifle Conference (2021–present)
2021–22	Mindy Miles	5–6	5th	
2022–23	Mindy Miles	7–5	3rd	NCAA 6th
2023–24	Mindy Miles	9–11	4th	NCAA 8th
2024–25	Richard Clark	12–6	5th	NCAA T–9th
2025–26	Richard Clark	18–1	1st	NCAA 5th

== See also ==
- List of NCAA rifle programs
