= 2003 NCAA Rifle Championships =

2003 NCAA Rifle Championship
Tournament information
- Sport: Collegiate rifle shooting
- Location: (New York (state)) West Point, NY
- Host(s): United States Military Academy
- Participants: 10 teams

Final positions
- Champions: Alaska (6th title)
- 1st runners-up: Xavier
- 2nd runners-up: Murray State

Tournament statistics
- Smallbore: Matthew Emmons, UAF
- Air rifle: Jamie Beyerle, UAF

The 2003 NCAA Rifle Championships were contested at the 24th annual NCAA-sanctioned competition to determine the team and individual national champions of co-ed collegiate rifle shooting in the United States. This year's championships were held at the United States Military Academy in West Point, New York.

Four-time defending champions Alaska once again topped the team standings, finishing 90 points (6,287–6,197) ahead of Xavier. This was the Nanooks' fifth consecutive and sixth overall team title.

Matthew Emmons (Alaska) once again repeated as the individual national champion for the smallbore rifle (his third consecutive in air rifle and fourth individual title overall, all since 2001). Emmons remains the only collegiate shooter with four NCAA individual titles. The air rifle title was claimed by Jamie Beyerle (Alaska).

== Qualification ==
With only one national collegiate championship for rifle shooting, all NCAA rifle programs (whether from Division I, Division II, or Division III) were eligible. A total of ten teams contested this championship, a return to the size of the original two championships in 1980 and 1981.

== Results ==
- Scoring: The championship consisted of 120 shots by each competitor in smallbore and 40 shots per competitor in air rifle.

=== Team title ===
- (H) = Hosts
- (DC) = Defending champions
- Italics = Inaugural championship

Rank	Team	Points
1st place, gold medalist(s)	Alaska (DC)	6,287
2nd place, silver medalist(s)	Xavier	6,197
3rd place, bronze medalist(s)	Murray State	6,158
4	Nevada	6,152
5	Jacksonville State	6,141
6	Kentucky	6,139
7	West Virginia	4,628
8	Tennessee Tech	4,610
9	Navy	1,531
10	Air Force	1,528

=== Individual events ===
Event	Winner	Score
Smallbore	Matthew Emmons, Alaska	1,191
Air rifle	Jamie Beyerle, Alaska	395
