= 1999 NCAA Rifle Championships =

1999 NCAA Rifle Championship
Tournament information
- Sport: Collegiate rifle shooting
- Location: (Vermont) Northfield, VT
- Host(s): Norwich University
- Participants: 9 teams

Final positions
- Champions: Alaska (2nd title)
- 1st runners-up: Navy
- 2nd runners-up: West Virginia

Tournament statistics
- Smallbore: Kelly Mansfield, UAF
- Air rifle: Kelly Mansfield, UAF

The 1999 NCAA Rifle Championships were contested at the 20th annual NCAA-sanctioned competition to determine the team and individual national champions of co-ed collegiate rifle shooting in the United States. The championship was hosted by Norwich University in Northfield, Vermont.

Alaska topped the team standings, finishing 108 points (6,276–6,168) points ahead of Navy. This was the Nanooks' second team title.

First the first time since 1980, one shooter, Kelly Mansfield (Alaska), captured the individual national championship for both the smallbore and air rifle events.

== Qualification ==
With only one national collegiate championship for rifle shooting, all NCAA rifle programs (whether from Division I, Division II, or Division III) were eligible. A total of nine teams ultimately contested this championship (an increase of two teams from 1998).

== Results ==
- Scoring: The championship consisted of 120 shots by each competitor in smallbore and 40 shots per competitor in air rifle.

=== Team title ===
| Rank | Team | Points |
|---|---|---|
| 1st place, gold medalist(s) | Alaska | 6,276 |
| 2nd place, silver medalist(s) | Navy | 6,168 |
| 3rd place, bronze medalist(s) | West Virginia | 6,156 |
| 4 | Murray State | 6,154 |
| 5 | Norwich (H) | 6,145 |
| 6 | Kentucky | 6,129 |
| 7 | Xavier | 6,102 |
| 8 | Jacksonville State | 4,575 |
| 9 | Air Force | 1,515 |

=== Individual events ===
| Event | Winner | Score |
|---|---|---|
| Smallbore | Kelly Mansfield, Alaska | 1,185 |
| Air rifle | Kelly Mansfield, Alaska | 396 |
