= 1992 NCAA Rifle Championships =

1992 NCAA Rifle Championship
Tournament information
- Sport: Collegiate rifle shooting
- Location: (Kentucky) Murray, KY
- Host: Murray State University
- Participants: 5 teams

Final positions
- Champions: West Virginia (8th title)
- 1st runners-up: Alaska
- 2nd runners-up: Murray State

Tournament statistics
- Smallbore: Tim Manges, WVU
- Air rifle: Ann-Marie Pfiffner, WVU

The 1992 NCAA Rifle Championships were contested at the 13th annual competition to determine the team and individual national champions of NCAA co-ed collegiate rifle shooting in the United States. The championship was hosted by Murray State University in Murray, Kentucky.

Four-time defending champions West Virginia once again retained the team championship, finishing 48 points ahead of Alaska in the team standings. It was the Mountaineers' eighth overall national title.

The individual champions were, for the smallbore rifle, Tim Manges (West Virginia), and Ann-Marie Pfiffner (West Virginia), for the air rifle.

== Qualification ==
Since there is only one national collegiate championship for rifle shooting, all NCAA rifle programs (whether from Division I, Division II, or Division III) were eligible. A total of five teams ultimately contested this championship.

== Results ==
- Scoring: The championship consisted of 120 shots by each competitor in smallbore and 40 shots per competitor in air rifle.

=== Team title ===
Rank	Team	Points
1st place, gold medalist(s)	West Virginia	6,214
2nd place, silver medalist(s)	Alaska	6,166
3rd place, bronze medalist(s)	Murray State	6,101
4	Navy	6,099
5	Xavier	6,068

=== Individual events ===
Event	Winner	Score
Smallbore	Tim Manges, West Virginia	1,172
Air rifle	Ann-Marie Pfiffner, West Virginia	390
