= 2014 NCAA Rifle Championships =

2014 co-ed rifle competition

2014 NCAA Rifle Championship

Tournament information
- Sport: Collegiate rifle shooting
- Location: (Kentucky) Murray, KY
- Host: Murray State University
- Venue(s): Pat Spurgin Rifle Range; CFSB Center
- Participants: 8 teams

Final positions
- Champions: West Virginia (16th title)
- 1st runners-up: Alaska
- 2nd runners-up: Kentucky

Tournament statistics
- Smallbore champion: Tim Sherry, Alaska
- Air rifle champion: Connor Davis, Kentucky

The 2014 NCAA Rifle Championships were contested at the 35th annual NCAA-sanctioned competition to determine the team and individual national champions of co-ed collegiate rifle shooting in the United States.

The championships were hosted by Murray State University at the Pat Spurgin Rifle Range and CFSB Center in Murray, Kentucky.

Defending champions West Virginia again won the team championship, the Mountaineers' sixteenth NCAA national title in rifle.

== Qualification ==
With only one national collegiate championship for rifle shooting, all NCAA rifle programs (whether from Division I, Division II, or Division III) were eligible. A total of eight teams contested this championship.

== Results ==
- Scoring: The championship consisted of 60 shots for both smallbore and air rifle per team.

=== Team title ===
- (DC) = Defending champions
- Italics = Inaugural championship
- † = Team won center shot tiebreaker

Rank	Team	Points
1st place, gold medalist(s)	West Virginia (DC)	4,705
2nd place, silver medalist(s)	Alaska	4,677
3rd place, bronze medalist(s)	Kentucky	4,675
4	Memphis	4,669
5	Nebraska	4,660
6	TCU	4,642
7	Jacksonville State	4,639
8	Army	4,635

=== Individual events ===
Event	Winner	Score
Smallbore	Tim Sherry, Alaska	452.1
Air rifle	Connor Davis, Kentucky	205.4
