= 1984 NCAA Rifle Championships =

Fifth annual collegiate shooting tournament

1984 NCAA Rifle Championship
Tournament information
- Sport: Collegiate rifle shooting
- Location: (Kentucky) Murray, KY
- Host: Murray State University
- Participants: 7

Final positions
- Champions: West Virginia (2nd title)
- 1st runners-up: East Tennessee State
- 2nd runners-up: Tennessee Tech

Tournament statistics
- Smallbore: Bob Broughton, WVU
- Air rifle: Pat Spurgin, MUR

The 1984 NCAA Rifle Championships were contested at the fifth annual tournament to determine the team and individual national champions of NCAA co-ed collegiate rifle shooting in the United States. The championship was held at Murray State University in Murray, Kentucky.

West Virginia, with a team score of 6,206, won their second consecutive, and second overall, team title, finishing 64 points ahead of East Tennessee State. The Mountaineers were coached by Olympian Edward Etzel.

The individual champions were, for the smallbore rifle, Bob Broughton (West Virginia) and, for the air rifle, Pat Spurgin (Murray State).

== Qualification ==
Since there is only one national collegiate championship for rifle shooting, all NCAA rifle programs (whether from Division I, Division II, or Division III) were eligible. A total of seven teams ultimately contested this championship.

== Results ==
- Scoring: The championship consisted of 120 shots by each competitor in smallbore and 40 shots per competitor in air rifle.

=== Team title ===
Rank	Team	Points
1st place, gold medalist(s)	West Virginia	6,206
2nd place, silver medalist(s)	East Tennessee State	6,142
3rd place, bronze medalist(s)	Tennessee Tech	6,121
4	Eastern Kentucky	6,107
5	Murray State	6,076
6	Army	6,058
7	Eastern Washington	5,867

=== Individual events ===
Event	Winner	Score
Smallbore	Bob Broughton, West Virginia	1,172
Air rifle	Pat Spurgin, Murray State	388
