= 2000 NCAA Rifle Championships =

2000 NCAA Rifle Championship
Tournament information
- Sport: Collegiate rifle shooting
- Location: (Virginia) Lexington, VA
- Host: Virginia Military Institute
- Venue: Kilbourne Hall
- Participants: 9 teams

Final positions
- Champions: Alaska (3rd title)
- 1st runners-up: Xavier
- 2nd runners-up: Nebraska

Tournament statistics
- Smallbore: Nicole Allaire, NEB
- Air rifle: Kelly Mansfield, UAF

The 2000 NCAA Rifle Championships were contested at the 21st annual NCAA-sanctioned competition to determine the team and individual national champions of co-ed collegiate rifle shooting in the United States. The championship was hosted by the Virginia Military Institute in Lexington, Virginia.

Defending champions Alaska again topped the team standings, finishing 139 points (6,285–6,156) points ahead of Xavier. This was the Nanooks' second consecutive and third overall team title. This event was also notable for being the first time West Virginia finished outside of the top three.

The individual championships went to Nicole Allaire (Nebraska) for the smallbore rifle and Kelly Mansfield (Alaska) for the air rifle. This was Mansfield's second consecutive air rifle title.

== Qualification ==
With only one national collegiate championship for rifle shooting, all NCAA rifle programs (whether from Division I, Division II, or Division III) were eligible. A total of nine teams contested this championship.

== Results ==
- Scoring: The championship consisted of 120 shots by each competitor in smallbore and 40 shots per competitor in air rifle.

=== Team title ===
Rank	Team	Points
1st place, gold medalist(s)	Alaska	6,285
2nd place, silver medalist(s)	Xavier	6,156
3rd place, bronze medalist(s)	Nebraska	6,121
4	Norwich	6,070
5	Navy	6,059
6	West Virginia	4,603
7	Air Force	4,557
8	Murray State	1,532
9	Jacksonville State	1,527

=== Individual events ===
Event	Winner	Score
Smallbore	Nicole Allaire, Nebraska	1,183
Air rifle	Kelly Mansfield, Alaska	398
