= 1985 NCAA Rifle Championships =

Sixth annual collegiate shooting tournament

1985 NCAA Rifle Championship
Tournament information
- Sport: Collegiate rifle shooting
- Location: (New York (state)) West Point, NY
- Host(s): United States Military Academy
- Participants: 7

Final positions
- Champions: Murray State (1st title)
- 1st runners-up: West Virginia
- 2nd runners-up: East Tennessee State

Tournament statistics
- Smallbore: Pat Spurgin, MUR
- Air rifle: Christian Hellern, WVU

The 1985 NCAA Rifle Championships were contested at the sixth annual competition to determine the team and individual national champions of NCAA co-ed collegiate rifle shooting in the United States. The championship was held at the United States Military Academy in West Point, New York.

Murray State, with a team score of 6,150, won their first team title, finishing one point ahead of two-time defending champions West Virginia. The Racers were coached by Elvis Green.

The individual champions were, for the smallbore rifle, Pat Spurgin (Murray State) and, for the air rifle, Christian Hellern (West Virginia). Spurgin won the previous year's air rifle title.

== Qualification ==
Since there is only one national collegiate championship for rifle shooting, all NCAA rifle programs (whether from Division I, Division II, or Division III) were eligible. A total of seven teams ultimately contested this championship.

== Results ==
- Scoring: The championship consisted of 120 shots by each competitor in smallbore and 40 shots per competitor in air rifle.

=== Team title ===
Rank	Team	Points
1st place, gold medalist(s)	Murray State	6,150
2nd place, silver medalist(s)	West Virginia	6,149
3rd place, bronze medalist(s)	East Tennessee State	6,102
4	Tennessee Tech	6,069
5	Army (H)	6,063
6	Eastern Kentucky	6,049
7	Tennessee–Martin	5,993

=== Individual events ===
Event	Winner	Score
Smallbore	Pat Spurgin, Murray State	1,168
Air rifle	Christian Heller, West Virginia	387
