= 2016 NCAA Rifle Championships =

2016 NCAA Rifle Championship

Tournament information
- Sport: Collegiate rifle shooting
- Location: (Ohio) Akron, OH
- Host(s): University of Akron
- Venue(s): Stile Athletics Field House
- Participants: 8 teams

Final positions
- Champions: West Virginia (18th title)
- 1st runners-up: TCU
- 2nd runners-up: Murray State

Tournament statistics
- Smallbore champion: Ginny Thrasher, West Virginia
- Air rifle champion: Ginny Thrasher, West Virginia

The 2016 NCAA Rifle Championships were contested at the 37th annual NCAA-sanctioned competition to determine the team and individual national champions of co-ed collegiate rifle shooting in the United States.

The championships were held at the Stile Athletics Field House at the University of Akron in Akron, Ohio.

Three-time defending champions West Virginia again won the team championship, the Mountaineers' eighteenth NCAA national title in rifle.

West Virginia's Ginny Thrasher became the fifth person to win both individual championships and the first since 2013.

== Qualification ==
With only one national collegiate championship for rifle shooting, all NCAA rifle programs (whether from Division I, Division II, or Division III) were eligible. A total of eight teams contested this championship.

== Results ==
- Scoring: The championship consisted of 60 shots for both smallbore and air rifle per team.

=== Team title ===
- (DC) = Defending champions
- Italics = Inaugural championship
- † = Team won center shot tiebreaker

| Rank | Team | Points |
|---|---|---|
| 1st place, gold medalist(s) | West Virginia (DC) | 4,703 |
| 2nd place, silver medalist(s) | TCU | 4,694 |
| 3rd place, bronze medalist(s) | Murray State | 4,690 |
| 4 | Air Force | 4,669† |
| 5 | Kentucky | 4,669 |
| 6 | Alaska | 4,664 |
| 7 | Ohio State | 4,659 |
| 8 | Nebraska | 4,650 |

=== Individual events ===
| Event | Winner | Score |
|---|---|---|
| Smallbore | Ginny Thrasher, West Virginia | 461.5 |
| Air rifle | Ginny Thrasher, West Virginia | 208.8 |
