= 2013 NCAA Rifle Championships =

2013 NCAA Rifle Championship

Tournament information
- Sport: Collegiate rifle shooting
- Location: (Ohio) Columbus, OH
- Host(s): Ohio State University
- Venue(s): Lt. Hugh W. Wylie Range
- Participants: 8 teams

Final positions
- Champions: West Virginia (15th title)
- 1st runners-up: Kentucky
- 2nd runners-up: TCU

Tournament statistics
- Smallbore champion: Petra Zublasing, West Virginia
- Air rifle champion: Petra Zublasing, West Virginia

The 2013 NCAA Rifle Championships were contested at the 34th annual NCAA-sanctioned competition to determine the team and individual national champions of co-ed collegiate rifle shooting in the United States.

The championship was again hosted by Ohio State University at the Lt. Hugh W. Wylie Range in Columbus, Ohio.

West Virginia won the team championship, the Mountaineers' fifteenth NCAA national title in rifle and first since 2009.

Additionally, West Virginia's Petra Zublasing became the fourth person to win both individual championships, smallbore and air rifle, in the same year and the first since Matthew Emmons in 2001.

== Qualification ==
With only one national collegiate championship for rifle shooting, all NCAA rifle programs (whether from Division I, Division II, or Division III) were eligible. A total of eight teams contested this championship.

== Results ==
- Scoring: The championship consisted of 60 shots for both smallbore and air rifle per team.

=== Team title ===
- (DC) = Defending champions
- Italics = Inaugural championship
- † = Team won center shot tiebreaker

Rank	Team	Points
1st place, gold medalist(s)	West Virginia	4,679
2nd place, silver medalist(s)	Kentucky	4,670
3rd place, bronze medalist(s)	TCU (DC)	4,664
4	Alaska	4,661
5	Air Force	4,658
6	Army	4,644
7	Nebraska	4,643
8	Jacksonville State	4,621

=== Individual events ===
Event	Winner	Score
Smallbore	Petra Zublasing, West Virginia	688.3
Air rifle	Petra Zublasing, West Virginia	701.7
