= 1983 NCAA Rifle Championships =

Fourth annual collegiate shooting tournament

1983 NCAA Rifle Championship
Tournament information
- Sport: Collegiate rifle shooting
- Location: (Ohio) Cincinnati, OH
- Host(s): Xavier University
- Venue(s): Xavier University Rifle Range
- Participants: 7

Final positions
- Champions: West Virginia (1st title)
- 1st runners-up: Tennessee Tech
- 2nd runners-up: East Tennessee State

Tournament statistics
- Smallbore: David Johnson, WVU
- Air rifle: Ray Slonena, TTU

The 1983 NCAA Rifle Championships were contested at the fourth annual tournament to determine the team and individual national champions of NCAA co-ed collegiate rifle shooting in the United States. The championship was held at Xavier University in Cincinnati, Ohio.

West Virginia, with a team score of 6,166, won their first team title, finishing 18 points ahead of three-time defending champion Tennessee Tech. The Mountaineers were coached by Olympian Edward Etzel.

The individual champions were, for the smallbore rifle, David Johnson (West Virginia) and, for the air rifle, Ray Slonena (Tennessee Tech).

== Qualification ==
Since there is only one national collegiate championship for rifle shooting, all NCAA rifle programs (whether from Division I, Division II, or Division III) were eligible. A total of seven teams ultimately contested this championship.

== Results ==
- Scoring: The championship consisted of 120 shots by each competitor in smallbore and 40 shots per competitor in air rifle.

=== Team title ===
Rank	Team	Points
1st place, gold medalist(s)	West Virginia	6,166
2nd place, silver medalist(s)	Tennessee Tech	6,148
3rd place, bronze medalist(s)	East Tennessee State	6,100
4	Murray State	6,094
5	Army	6,073
6	Eastern Kentucky	6,032
7	Eastern Washington	5,976

=== Individual events ===
Event	Winner	Score
Smallbore	David Johnson, West Virginia	1,175
Air rifle	Ray Slonena, Tennessee Tech	389
