= 2006 NCAA Rifle Championships =

2006 NCAA Rifle Championship

Tournament information
- Sport: Collegiate rifle shooting
- Location: Colorado Springs, CO
- Host(s): United States Air Force Academy
- Venue(s): Cadet Rifle Range
- Participants: 9 teams

Final positions
- Champions: Alaska (8th title)
- 1st runners-up: Nebraska
- 2nd runners-up: Army

Tournament statistics
- Smallbore: Jamie Beyerle, Alaska
- Air rifle: Kristina Fehlings, Nebraska

The 2006 NCAA Rifle Championships were contested at the 27th annual NCAA-sanctioned competition to determine the team and individual national champions of co-ed collegiate rifle shooting in the United States.

The championships were held at the Cadet Rifle Range at the United States Air Force Academy in Colorado Springs, Colorado.

Alaska won the team championship, the Nanooks' eighth NCAA national title in rifle.

== Qualification ==
With only one national collegiate championship for rifle shooting, all NCAA rifle programs (whether from Division I, Division II, or Division III) were eligible. A total of nine teams contested this championship.

== Results ==
- Scoring: The championship consisted of 60 shots for both smallbore and air rifle per team.

=== Team title ===
- (DC) = Defending champions
- Italics = Inaugural championship

| Rank | Team | Points |
|---|---|---|
| 1st place, gold medalist(s) | Alaska | 4,682 |
| 2nd place, silver medalist(s) | Nebraska | 4,666 |
| 3rd place, bronze medalist(s) | Army (DC) | 4,650 |
| 4 | Navy | 4,625 |
| 5 | Murray State | 4,621 |
| 6 | Ole Miss | 4,616 |
| 7 | Kentucky | 4,600 |
| 8 | Jacksonville State | 2,339 |
| 9 | Nevada | 2,332 |

=== Individual events ===
| Event | Winner | Score |
|---|---|---|
| Smallbore | Jamie Beyerle, Alaska | 690.5 |
| Air rifle | Kristina Fehlings, Nebraska | 692.0 |
