= 1996 NCAA Rifle Championships =

1996 NCAA Rifle Championship
Tournament information
- Sport: Collegiate rifle shooting
- Location: Colorado Springs, CO
- Host: United States Air Force Academy
- Venue: Cadet Rifle Range
- Participants: 6 teams

Final positions
- Champions: West Virginia (11th title)
- 1st runners-up: Air Force
- 2nd runners-up: Kentucky

Tournament statistics
- Smallbore: Joe Johnson, NAVY
- Air rifle: Trevor Gathman, WVU

The 1996 NCAA Rifle Championships were contested at the 17th annual competition to determine the team and individual national champions of NCAA co-ed collegiate rifle shooting in the United States. The championship was hosted by the United States Air Force Academy at the Cadet Rifle Range in Colorado Springs, Colorado.

Defending champions West Virginia again topped the team standings, finishing 11 points ahead of Air Force. This was the Mountaineers' eleventh team title.

The individual champions were, for the smallbore rifle, Joe Johnson (Navy), and Trevor Gathman (West Virginia), for the air rifle.

== Qualification ==
Since there is only one national collegiate championship for rifle shooting, all NCAA rifle programs (whether from Division I, Division II, or Division III) were eligible. A total of six teams ultimately contested this championship.

== Results ==
- Scoring: The championship consisted of 120 shots by each competitor in smallbore and 40 shots per competitor in air rifle.

=== Team title ===
Rank	Team	Points
1st place, gold medalist(s)	West Virginia	6,179
2nd place, silver medalist(s)	Air Force (H)	6,168
3rd place, bronze medalist(s)	Kentucky	6,160
4	Navy	6,140
5	Alaska	6,123
6	Xavier	6,104

=== Individual events ===
Event	Winner	Score
Smallbore	Joe Johnson, Navy	1,170
Air rifle	Trevor Gathman, West Virginia	394
