= 2005 NCAA Rifle Championships =

2005 NCAA Rifle Championship
- Teams: 10
- Format: Points system
- Finals site: Reno, NV; University of Nevada, Reno
- Champions: Army (1st title)
- Runner-up: Jacksonville State
- Semifinalists: Nebraska
- Most outstanding performer: Beth Tidmore (Memphis)

The 2005 NCAA Rifle Championships were contested at the 26th annual NCAA-sanctioned competition to determine the team and individual national champions of co-ed collegiate rifle shooting in the United States.

The championships were held at the Nevada Wolf Pack Rifle Range at the University of Nevada in Reno, Nevada.

Army won the team championship, the Black Knights' first NCAA national title in rifle.

== Qualification ==
With only one national collegiate championship for rifle shooting, all NCAA rifle programs (whether from Division I, Division II, or Division III) were eligible. A total of nine teams contested this championship.

== Results ==
- Scoring: The championship consisted of 60 shots for both smallbore and air rifle per team.

=== Team title ===
- (DC) = Defending champions
- Italics = Inaugural championship

Rank	Team	Points
1st place, gold medalist(s)	Army	4,659
2nd place, silver medalist(s)	Jacksonville State	4,658
3rd place, bronze medalist(s)	Nebraska	4,657
4	Alaska (DC)	4,656
5	Navy	4,637
6	Kentucky	4,627
7	Memphis	2,329
8	Nevada	2,317
9	Xavier	2,289
10	UTEP	2,284

=== Individual events ===
Event	Winner	Score
Smallbore	Matthew Rawlings, Alaska	686.5
Air rifle	Beth Tidmore, Memphis	694.2
