= 1986 NCAA rifle championships =

Seventh annual collegiate shooting tournament

1986 NCAA Rifle Championship
Tournament information
- Sport: Collegiate rifle shooting
- Location: Annapolis, Maryland
- Host(s): United States Naval Academy
- Participants: 7

Final positions
- Champions: West Virginia (3rd title)
- 1st runners-up: Murray State
- 2nd runners-up: Army

Tournament statistics
- Smallbore: Mike Anti, WVU
- Air rifle: Marianne Wallace, MUR

The 1986 NCAA Rifle Championships were contested at the seventh annual competition to determine the team and individual national champions of NCAA co-ed collegiate rifle shooting in the United States. The championship was held at the United States Naval Academy in Annapolis, Maryland.

West Virginia, with a team score of 6,229, won their third team title, besting defending champions Murray State by 66 points in the team standings. It was the Mountaineers third title in four years and the third for coach Edward Etzel.

The individual champions were, for the smallbore rifle, Mike Anti (West Virginia), and, for the air rifle, Marianne Wallace (Murray State).

== Qualification ==
Since there is only one national collegiate championship for rifle shooting, all NCAA rifle programs (whether from Division I, Division II, or Division III) were eligible. A total of seven teams ultimately contested this championship.

== Results ==
- Scoring: The championship consisted of 120 shots by each competitor in smallbore and 40 shots per competitor in air rifle.

=== Team title ===
Rank	Team	Points
1st place, gold medalist(s)	West Virginia	6,229
2nd place, silver medalist(s)	Murray State	6,163
3rd place, bronze medalist(s)	Army	6,138
4	Tennessee Tech	6,090
5	East Tennessee State; South Florida	6,085
7	Washington State	6,016

=== Individual events ===
Event	Winner	Score
Smallbore	Mike Anti, West Virginia	1,168
Air rifle	Marianne Wallace, Murray State	387
