= 1993 NCAA Rifle Championships =

1993 NCAA Rifle Championship
Tournament information
- Sport: Collegiate rifle shooting
- Location: (Virginia) Lexington, VA
- Host: Virginia Military Institute
- Venue: Kilbourne Hall
- Participants: 7 teams

Final positions
- Champions: West Virginia (9th title)
- 1st runners-up: Alaska
- 2nd runners-up: Air Force

Tournament statistics
- Smallbore: Eric Uptagrafft, WVU
- Air rifle: Trevor Gathman, WVU

The 1993 NCAA Rifle Championships were contested at the 13th annual competition to determine the team and individual national champions of NCAA co-ed collegiate rifle shooting in the United States. The championship was hosted by the Virginia Military Institute at Kilbourne Hall in Lexington, Virginia.

Five-time defending champions West Virginia once again retained the team championship, finishing just 10 points ahead of Alaska in the team standings. It was the Mountaineers' ninth overall national title.

The individual champions were, for the smallbore rifle, Eric Uptagrafft (West Virginia), and Trevor Gathman (West Virginia), for the air rifle.

== Qualification ==
Since there is only one national collegiate championship for rifle shooting, all NCAA rifle programs (whether from Division I, Division II, or Division III) were eligible. A total of seven teams ultimately contested this championship.

== Results ==
- Scoring: The championship consisted of 120 shots by each competitor in smallbore and 40 shots per competitor in air rifle.

=== Team title ===
Rank	Team	Points
1st place, gold medalist(s)	West Virginia	6,179
2nd place, silver medalist(s)	Alaska	6,169
3rd place, bronze medalist(s)	Air Force	6,122
4	Norwich	6,115
5	Xavier	6,110
6	Navy	6,104
7	Murray State	6,100

=== Individual events ===
Event	Winner	Score
Smallbore	Eric Uptagrafft, West Virginia	1,174
Air rifle	Trevor Gathman, West Virginia	390
