= 2011 NCAA Rifle Championships =

2011 NCAA Rifle Championship

Tournament information
- Sport: Collegiate rifle shooting
- Location: (Georgia (U.S. state)) Fort Benning, GA
- Host(s): Columbus State University
- Venue(s): United States Army Marksmanship Unit
- Participants: 8 teams

Final positions
- Champions: Kentucky (1st title)
- 1st runners-up: West Virginia
- 2nd runners-up: TCU

Tournament statistics
- Smallbore champion: Ethan Settlemires, Kentucky
- Air rifle champion: Nicco Campriani, West Virginia

The 2011 NCAA Rifle Championships were contested at the 32nd annual NCAA-sanctioned competition to determine the team and individual national champions of co-ed collegiate rifle shooting in the United States.

The championships were held at the United States Army Marksmanship Unit at Fort Benning in Columbus, Georgia and hosted by nearby Columbus State University.

Kentucky won the team championship, the Wildcats' first NCAA national title in rifle.

== Qualification ==
With only one national collegiate championship for rifle shooting, all NCAA rifle programs (whether from Division I, Division II, or Division III) were eligible. A total of eight teams contested this championship.

== Results ==
- Scoring: The championship consisted of 60 shots for both smallbore and air rifle per team.

=== Team title ===
- (DC) = Defending champions
- Italics = Inaugural championship
- † = Team won center shot tiebreaker

Rank	Team	Points
1st place, gold medalist(s)	Kentucky	4,700
2nd place, silver medalist(s)	West Virginia	4,697
3rd place, bronze medalist(s)	TCU (DC)	4,664
4	Jacksonville State	4,650
5	Murray State	4,634†
6	Alaska	4,634
7	Navy	4,609
8	Army	4,596

=== Individual events ===
Event	Winner	Score
Smallbore	Ethan Settlemires, Kentucky	691.0
Air rifle	Nicco Campriani, West Virginia	701.0
