= 2001 NCAA Rifle Championships =

2001 NCAA Rifle Championship
Tournament information
- Sport: Collegiate rifle shooting
- Location: (Ohio) Columbus, OH
- Host(s): Ohio State University
- Venue(s): Lt. Hugh W. Wylie Range
- Participants: 9 teams

Final positions
- Champions: Alaska (4th title)
- 1st runners-up: Kentucky
- 2nd runners-up: West Virginia

Tournament statistics
- Smallbore: Matthew Emmons, UAF
- Air rifle: Matthew Emmons, UAF

The 2001 NCAA Rifle Championships were contested at the 22nd annual NCAA-sanctioned competition to determine the team and individual national champions of co-ed collegiate rifle shooting in the United States. The championship was hosted by Ohio State University at the Lt. Hugh W. Wylie Range in Columbus, Ohio.

Two-time defending champions Alaska once again topped the team standings, finishing 108 points (6,283–6,175) ahead of Kentucky. This was the Nanooks' third consecutive and fourth overall team title.

The individual championships, for smallbore rifle and air rifle, went to Matthew Emmons (Alaska). Emmons became the third person to win both individual titles during the same year.

== Qualification ==
With only one national collegiate championship for rifle shooting, all NCAA rifle programs (whether from Division I, Division II, or Division III) were eligible. A total of nine teams contested this championship.

== Results ==
- Scoring: The championship consisted of 120 shots by each competitor in smallbore and 40 shots per competitor in air rifle.

=== Team title ===
Rank	Team	Points
1st place, gold medalist(s)	Alaska	6,283
2nd place, silver medalist(s)	Kentucky	6,175
3rd place, bronze medalist(s)	West Virginia	6,174
4	Xavier	6,160
5	Murray State	6,143
6	Nebraska	6,135
7	Tennessee Tech	6,079
8	Navy	4,567
9	Jacksonville State	1,544

=== Individual events ===
Event	Winner	Score
Smallbore	Matthew Emmons, Alaska	1,178
Air rifle	Matthew Emmons, Alaska	392
