= 1991 NCAA Rifle Championships =

Rifle shooting competition in 1991

1991 NCAA Rifle Championship
Tournament information
- Sport: Collegiate rifle shooting
- Location: (New York (state)) West Point, NY
- Host(s): United States Military Academy
- Participants: 6 teams

Final positions
- Champions: West Virginia (7th title)
- 1st runners-up: Alaska
- 2nd runners-up: Ohio State

Tournament statistics
- Smallbore: Soma Dutta, UTEP
- Air rifle: Ann-Marie Pfiffner, WVU

The 1991 NCAA Rifle Championships were contested at the 11th annual competition to determine the team and individual national champions of NCAA co-ed collegiate rifle shooting in the United States. The championship was held at the United States Military Academy in West Point, New York.

Three-time defending champions West Virginia once again retained the team championship, finishing 61 points ahead of Alaska in the team standings. It was the Mountaineers' seventh overall national title.

The individual champions were, for the smallbore rifle, Soma Dutta (UTEP), and Ann-Marie Pfiffner (West Virginia), for the air rifle.

== Qualification ==
Since there is only one national collegiate championship for rifle shooting, all NCAA rifle programs (whether from Division I, Division II, or Division III) were eligible. A total of six teams ultimately contested this championship.

== Results ==
- Scoring: The championship consisted of 120 shots by each competitor in smallbore and 40 shots per competitor in air rifle.

=== Team title ===
Rank	Team	Points
1st place, gold medalist(s)	West Virginia	6,171
2nd place, silver medalist(s)	Alaska–Fairbanks	6,110
3rd place, bronze medalist(s)	Ohio State	6,100
4	Canisius	6,077
5	Murray State	6,034
6	St. John's (NY)	6,016

=== Individual events ===
Event	Winner	Score
Smallbore	Soma Dutta, UTEP	1,171
Air rifle	Ann-Marie Pfiffner, West Virginia	391
