= 2010 NCAA Rifle Championships =

American collegiate sport shooting competition

2010 NCAA Rifle Championship

Tournament information
- Sport: Collegiate rifle shooting
- Location: (Texas) Fort Worth, TX
- Host: Texas Christian University
- Venue: TCU Rifle Range
- Participants: 8 teams

Final positions
- Champions: TCU (1st title)
- 1st runners-up: Alaska
- 2nd runners-up: West Virginia

Tournament statistics
- Smallbore champion: Sarah Scherer, TCU
- Air rifle champion: Jonathan Hall, Columbus State

The 2010 NCAA Rifle Championships were contested at the 31st annual NCAA-sanctioned competition to determine the team and individual national champions of co-ed collegiate rifle shooting in the United States.

The championships were again held at the TCU Rifle Range at Texas Christian University in Fort Worth, Texas.

Hosts TCU won the team championship, the Horned Frogs' first NCAA national title in rifle.

== Qualification ==
With only one national collegiate championship for rifle shooting, all NCAA rifle programs (whether from Division I, Division II, or Division III) were eligible. A total of eight teams contested this championship.

== Results ==
- Scoring: The championship consisted of 60 shots for both smallbore and air rifle per team.

=== Team title ===
- (DC) = Defending champions
- Italics = Inaugural championship

Rank	Team	Points
1st place, gold medalist(s)	TCU	4,675
2nd place, silver medalist(s)	Alaska	4,653
3rd place, bronze medalist(s)	West Virginia (DC)	4,641
4	Kentucky	4,640
5	Army	4,627
6	Nebraska	4,619
7	Murray State	4,611
8	Navy	4,602

=== Individual events ===
Event	Winner	Score
Smallbore	Sarah Scherer, TCU	685.0
Air rifle	Jonathan Hall, Columbus State	699.9
