= 1997 NCAA Rifle Championships =

1997 NCAA Rifle Championship
Tournament information
- Sport: Collegiate rifle shooting
- Location: (Kentucky) Murray, KY
- Host: Murray State University
- Participants: 7 teams

Final positions
- Champions: West Virginia (12th title)
- 1st runners-up: Kentucky
- 2nd runners-up: Alaska

Tournament statistics
- Smallbore: Marcos Scrivner, WVU
- Air rifle: Marra Hastings, MUR

The 1997 NCAA Rifle Championships were contested at the 18th annual competition to determine the team and individual national champions of NCAA co-ed collegiate rifle shooting in the United States. The championship was hosted by Murray State University in Murray, Kentucky.

Two-time defending champions West Virginia once again topped the team standings, finishing 48 points ahead of Kentuckye. This was the Mountaineers' twelfth team title.

The individual champions were, for the smallbore rifle, Marcos Scrivner (West Virginia), and Marra Hastings (Murray State), for the air rifle.

== Qualification ==
Since there is only one national collegiate championship for rifle shooting, all NCAA rifle programs (whether from Division I, Division II, or Division III) were eligible. A total of seven teams ultimately contested this championship (an increase of one team from 1996).

== Results ==
- Scoring: The championship consisted of 120 shots by each competitor in smallbore and 40 shots per competitor in air rifle.

=== Team title ===
Rank	Team	Points
1st place, gold medalist(s)	West Virginia	6,223
2nd place, silver medalist(s)	Kentucky	6,175
3rd place, bronze medalist(s)	Alaska	6,171
4	Murray State (H)	6,159
5	Air Force	6,131
6	Navy	6,106
7	Norwich	6,078

=== Individual events ===
Event	Winner	Score
Smallbore	Marcos Scrivner, West Virginia	1,176
Air rifle	Marra Hastings, Murray State	393
