= 2004 NCAA Rifle Championships =

2004 NCAA Rifle Championship

Tournament information
- Sport: Collegiate rifle shooting
- Location: (Kentucky) Murray, KY
- Host: Murray State University
- Venue: Pat Spurgin Rifle Range
- Participants: 9 teams

Final positions
- Champions: Alaska (7th title)
- 1st runners-up: Nevada
- 2nd runners-up: Navy

Tournament statistics
- Smallbore: Matthew Rawlings, Alaska
- Air rifle: Morgan Hicks, Murray State

The 2004 NCAA Rifle Championships were contested at the 25th annual NCAA-sanctioned competition to determine the team and individual national champions of co-ed collegiate rifle shooting in the United States.

The championships were held at the Pat Spurgin Rifle Range at Murray State University in Murray, Kentucky.

Five-time defending champions Alaska won the team championship, the Nanooks' sixth consecutive and seventh overall NCAA national title.

== Qualification ==
With only one national collegiate championship for rifle shooting, all NCAA rifle programs (whether from Division I, Division II, or Division III) were eligible. A total of nine teams contested this championship.

== Results ==
- Scoring: The championship consisted of 120 shots by each competitor in smallbore and 40 shots per competitor in air rifle.

=== Team title ===
- (DC) = Defending champions
- Italics = Inaugural championship

Rank	Team	Points
1st place, gold medalist(s)	Alaska (DC)	6,273
2nd place, silver medalist(s)	Nevada	6,185
3rd place, bronze medalist(s)	Navy	6,182
4	Army	6,176
5	Xavier	6,164
6	Nebraska	6,147
7	Tennessee Tech	6,123
8	Kentucky	4,663
9	Murray State	1,549

=== Individual events ===
Event	Winner	Score
Smallbore	Matthew Rawlings, Alaska	1,179
Air rifle	Morgan Hicks, Murray State	398
