= 1982 NCAA Rifle Championships =

Third annual collegiate shooting tournament

1982 NCAA Rifle Championship
Tournament information
- Sport: Collegiate rifle shooting
- Location: (Virginia) Lexington, VA
- Host(s): Virginia Military Institute
- Participants: 9

Final positions
- Champions: Tennessee Tech (2nd title)
- 1st runners-up: West Virginia
- 2nd runners-up: Eastern Kentucky

Tournament statistics
- Smallbore: Kurt Fitz-Randolph, TTU
- Air rifle: John Rost, WVU

The 1982 NCAA Rifle Championships were contested at the third annual tournament to determine the team and individual national champions of NCAA co-ed collegiate rifle shooting in the United States. The championship was held at the Virginia Military Institute in Lexington, Virginia during March 1982.

Tennessee Tech, with a team score of 6,138, once again won the team title; the Golden Eagles finished ahead of West Virginia, runners-up for the third consecutive year, with a score of 6,136. Tennessee Tech was coached by James Newkirk.

Both individual champions were repeat winners from the previous year: Kurt Fitz-Randolph (Tennessee Tech) for smallbore rifle and John Rost (West Virginia) for air rifle.

== Qualification ==
Since there is only one national collegiate championship for rifle shooting, all NCAA rifle programs (whether from Division I, Division II, or Division III) were eligible. A total of 9 teams ultimately contested this championship.

== Results ==
- Scoring: The championship consisted of 120 shots by each competitor in smallbore and 40 shots per competitor in air rifle.

=== Team title ===
Rank	Team	Points
1st place, gold medalist(s)	Tennessee Tech	6,138
2nd place, silver medalist(s)	West Virginia	6,136
3rd place, bronze medalist(s)	Eastern Kentucky	6,128
4	East Tennessee State	6,125
5	Murray State	6,089
6	Army	6,014
7	Navy	6,012
8	St. John's (NY)	5,968
9	NC State	5,934

=== Individual events ===
Event	Winner	Score
Smallbore	Kurt Fitz-Randolph, Tennessee Tech	1,167
Air rifle	John Rost, West Virginia	390
