= 1994 NCAA Rifle Championships =

1994 NCAA Rifle Championship
Tournament information
- Sport: Collegiate rifle shooting
- Location: (Kentucky) Murray, KY
- Host: Murray State University
- Participants: 6 teams

Final positions
- Champions: Alaska (1st title)
- 1st runners-up: West Virginia
- 2nd runners-up: Kentucky

Tournament statistics
- Smallbore: Cory Brunetti, UAF
- Air rifle: Nancy Napolski, UK

The 1994 NCAA Rifle Championships were contested at the 15th annual competition to determine the team and individual national champions of NCAA co-ed collegiate rifle shooting in the United States. The championship was hosted by the Murray State University in Murray, Kentucky.

Alaska upset six-time defending champions West Virginia to capture the team championship. It was the first championship for the Nanooks, who finished 7 points ahead of the Mountaineers in the standings.

The individual champions were, for the smallbore rifle, Cory Brunetti (Alaska), and Nancy Napolski (Kentucky), for the air rifle.

== Qualification ==
Since there is only one national collegiate championship for rifle shooting, all NCAA rifle programs (whether from Division I, Division II, or Division III) were eligible. A total of six teams ultimately contested this championship.

== Results ==
- Scoring: The championship consisted of 120 shots by each competitor in smallbore and 40 shots per competitor in air rifle.

=== Team title ===
Rank	Team	Points
1st place, gold medalist(s)	Alaska	6,194
2nd place, silver medalist(s)	West Virginia	6,187
3rd place, bronze medalist(s)	Kentucky	6,165
4	Air Force	6,161
5	Murray State	6,150
6	Navy	6,095

=== Individual events ===
Event	Winner	Score
Smallbore	Cory Brunetti, Alaska	1,173
Air rifle	Nancy Napolski, Kentucky	391
