= 2007 NCAA Rifle Championships =

2007 NCAA Rifle Championship

Tournament information
- Sport: Collegiate rifle shooting
- Location: (Alaska) Fairbanks, AK
- Host(s): University of Alaska Fairbanks
- Venue(s): E.F. Horton Rifle Range
- Participants: 8 teams

Final positions
- Champions: Alaska (9th title)
- 1st runners-up: Army
- 2nd runners-up: Jacksonville State

Tournament statistics
- Smallbore champion: Josh Albright, Navy
- Air rifle champion: Michael Dickinson, Jacksonville State

The 2007 NCAA Rifle Championships were contested at the 28th annual NCAA-sanctioned competition to determine the team and individual national champions of co-ed collegiate rifle shooting in the United States.

The championships were held at the E.F. Horton Rifle Range at the University of Alaska Fairbanks in Fairbanks, Alaska.

Hosts and defending champions Alaska won the team championship, the Nanooks' ninth NCAA national title in rifle.

== Qualification ==
With only one national collegiate championship for rifle shooting, all NCAA rifle programs (whether from Division I, Division II, or Division III) were eligible. A total of eight teams contested this championship.

== Results ==
- Scoring: The championship consisted of 60 shots for both smallbore and air rifle per team.

=== Team title ===
- (DC) = Defending champions
- Italics = Inaugural championship

| Rank | Team | Points |
|---|---|---|
| 1st place, gold medalist(s) | Alaska (DC) | 4,662 |
| 2nd place, silver medalist(s) | Army | 4,644 |
| 3rd place, bronze medalist(s) | Jacksonville State | 4,639 |
| 4 | Kentucky | 4,636 |
| T5 | Nebraska | 4,623 |
| T5 | TCU | 4,623 |
| 7 | Navy | 4,589 |
| 8 | Murray State | 4,565 |

=== Individual events ===
| Event | Winner | Score |
|---|---|---|
| Smallbore | Josh Albright, Navy | 679.5 |
| Air rifle | Michael Dickinson, Jacksonville State | 692.2 |
