= 2012 NCAA Rifle Championships =

2012 NCAA Rifle Championship

Tournament information
- Sport: Collegiate rifle shooting
- Location: (Ohio) Columbus, OH
- Host(s): Ohio State University
- Venue(s): Lt. Hugh W. Wylie Range
- Participants: 8 teams

Final positions
- Champions: TCU (2nd title)
- 1st runners-up: Kentucky
- 2nd runners-up: Alaska

Tournament statistics
- Smallbore champion: Sarah Scherer (2), TCU
- Air rifle champion: Petra Zublasing, West Virginia

The 2012 NCAA Rifle Championships were contested at the 33rd annual NCAA-sanctioned competition to determine the team and individual national champions of co-ed collegiate rifle shooting in the United States.

The championship was hosted by Ohio State University at the Lt. Hugh W. Wylie Range in Columbus, Ohio.

TCU won the team championship, the Horned Frogs' second NCAA national title in rifle.

== Qualification ==
With only one national collegiate championship for rifle shooting, all NCAA rifle programs (whether from Division I, Division II, or Division III) were eligible. A total of eight teams contested this championship.

== Results ==
- Scoring: The championship consisted of 60 shots for both smallbore and air rifle per team.

=== Team title ===
- (DC) = Defending champions
- Italics = Inaugural championship
- † = Team won center shot tiebreaker

Rank	Team	Points
1st place, gold medalist(s)	TCU	4,676
2nd place, silver medalist(s)	Kentucky (DC)	4,661†
3rd place, bronze medalist(s)	Alaska	4,661
4	Army	4,658
5	UTEP	4,648
6	West Virginia	4,647
7	Jacksonville State	4,645
8	Nevada	4,632

=== Individual events ===
Event	Winner	Score
Smallbore	Sarah Scherer, TCU	688.6
Air rifle	Petra Zublasing, West Virginia	696.2
