= 2009 NCAA Rifle Championships =

American collegiate sport shooting competition

2009 NCAA Rifle Championship

Tournament information
- Sport: Collegiate rifle shooting
- Location: (Texas) Fort Worth, TX
- Host: Texas Christian University
- Venue: TCU Rifle Range
- Participants: 8 teams

Final positions
- Champions: West Virginia (14th title)
- 1st runners-up: Kentucky
- 2nd runners-up: Jacksonville State

Tournament statistics
- Smallbore champion: Brian Carstensen; Jacksonville State
- Air rifle champion: Jenna Compton; Akron

The 2009 NCAA Rifle Championships were contested at the 30th annual NCAA-sanctioned competition to determine the team and individual national champions of co-ed collegiate rifle shooting in the United States.

The championships were held at the TCU Rifle Range at Texas Christian University in Fort Worth, Texas.

West Virginia won the team championship, the Mountaineers' fourteenth NCAA national title in rifle and first since 1998.

== Qualification ==
With only one national collegiate championship for rifle shooting, all NCAA rifle programs (whether from Division I, Division II, or Division III) were eligible. A total of eight teams contested this championship.

== Results ==
- Scoring: The championship consisted of 60 shots for both smallbore and air rifle per team.

=== Team title ===
- (DC) = Defending champions
- Italics = Inaugural championship

Rank	Team	Points
1st place, gold medalist(s)	West Virginia	4,643
2nd place, silver medalist(s)	Kentucky	4,638
3rd place, bronze medalist(s)	Jacksonville State	4,636
4	Alaska (DC)	4,624
5	TCU	4,614
6	Army	4,611
7	Navy	4,606
8	Nevada	4,586

=== Individual events ===
Event	Winner	Score
Smallbore	Brian Carstensen, Jacksonville State	682.2
Air rifle	Jenna Compton, Akron	691.6
