= 1995 NCAA Rifle Championships =

1995 NCAA Rifle Championship
Tournament information
- Sport: Collegiate rifle shooting
- Location: (Maryland) Annapolis, MD
- Host: United States Naval Academy
- Venue: Bancroft Hall Rifle Range
- Participants: 6 teams

Final positions
- Champions: West Virginia (10th title)
- 1st runners-up: Air Force
- 2nd runners-up: Kentucky

Tournament statistics
- Smallbore: Oleg Seleznev, UAF
- Air rifle: Benjamin Belden, MUR

The 1995 NCAA Rifle Championships were contested at the 16th annual competition to determine the team and individual national champions of NCAA co-ed collegiate rifle shooting in the United States. The championship was hosted by the United States Naval Academy at the Bancroft Hall Rifle Range in Annapolis, Maryland.

West Virginia returned to the top of the team standings after a one-year absence, finishing 54 points ahead of Air Force. This was the tenth team title for the Mountaineers.

The individual champions were, for the smallbore rifle, Oleg Seleznev (Alaska), and Benjamin Belden (Murray State), for the air rifle.

== Qualification ==
Since there is only one national collegiate championship for rifle shooting, all NCAA rifle programs (whether from Division I, Division II, or Division III) were eligible. A total of six teams ultimately contested this championship.

== Results ==
- Scoring: The championship consisted of 120 shots by each competitor in smallbore and 40 shots per competitor in air rifle.

=== Team title ===
Rank	Team	Points
1st place, gold medalist(s)	West Virginia	6,241
2nd place, silver medalist(s)	Air Force	6,187
3rd place, bronze medalist(s)	Kentucky	6,171
4	Murray State	6,157
5	Alaska	6,154
6	Navy (H)	6,136

=== Individual events ===
Event	Winner	Score
Smallbore	Oleg Seleznev, Alaska	1,177
Air rifle	Benjamin Belden, Murray State	390
