= 2008 NCAA Rifle Championships =

American collegiate sport shooting competition

2008 NCAA Rifle Championship

Tournament information
- Sport: Collegiate rifle shooting
- Location: (New York (state)) West Point, NY
- Host: United States Military Academy
- Venue: Tronsrue Marksmanship Center
- Participants: 8 teams

Final positions
- Champions: Alaska (10th title)
- 1st runners-up: Army
- 2nd runners-up: TCU

Tournament statistics
- Smallbore champion: Chris Abalo, Army
- Air rifle champion: Patrik Sartz, Alaska

The 2008 NCAA Rifle Championships were contested at the 29th annual NCAA-sanctioned competition to determine the team and individual national champions of co-ed collegiate rifle shooting in the United States.

The championships were held at the Tronsrue Marksmanship Center at the United States Military Academy in West Point, New York.

Two-time defending champions Alaska won the team championship, the Nanooks' tenth NCAA national title in rifle.

== Qualification ==
With only one national collegiate championship for rifle shooting, all NCAA rifle programs (whether from Division I, Division II, or Division III) were eligible. A total of eight teams contested this championship.

== Results ==
- Scoring: The championship consisted of 60 shots for both smallbore and air rifle per team.

=== Team title ===
- (DC) = Defending champions
- Italics = Inaugural championship

Rank	Team	Points
1st place, gold medalist(s)	Alaska (DC)	4,662
2nd place, silver medalist(s)	Army	4,652
3rd place, bronze medalist(s)	TCU	4,627
4	Nebraska	4,625
5	Kentucky	4,623
6	West Virginia	4,616
7	Navy	4,610
8	Nevada	4,591

=== Individual events ===
Event	Winner	Score
Smallbore	Chris Abalo, Army	687.6
Air rifle	Patrik Sartz, Alaska	696.4
