= Dawn Rogers =

American college athletics administrator

Current position
- Title: Deputy athletic director
- Team: SMU
- Conference: AAC

Biographical details
- Education: Ithaca College, University of Massachusetts Amherst

Administrative career (AD unless noted)
- 1989–1998: Akron (Assistant AD)
- 1998–2004: Xavier (Associate AD)
- 2004–2006: Xavier
- 2006–2015: Arizona State (Associate AD)
- 2017–2023: Baylor (Deputy AD/SWA)
- 2023–present: SMU (Deputy AD)

Dawn Rogers is an American college athletics administrator, currently serving as Deputy Athletics Director at Southern Methodist University. She previously served as athletic director for Xavier University from 2004 to 2006. She has also served as a deputy athletic director at Baylor University from 2017 to 2023; as an associate athletic director at Xavier University from 1998 to 2004 and at Arizona State University from 2006 to 2015; and as assistant athletic director at the University of Akron from 1989 to 1998. From 2015 to 2017, Rogers worked as the executive director of a committee organizing the 2017 NCAA men's basketball Final Four, which was held at University of Phoenix Stadium in Glendale, Arizona. Rogers graduated from Ithaca College, where she lettered in volleyball and track and field, with a bachelor's degree in 1986, and from the University of Massachusetts Amherst with a master's degree in 1987. Rogers was named Deputy Athletics Director at Baylor University on June 5, 2017. Rogers was named Deputy Athletics Director at Southern Methodist University in January 2023.
