= Stephen Scherer =

American sport shooter

Stephen Scherer (February 22, 1989 – October 3, 2010) was a Cadet with the class of 2011 at the United States Military Academy who competed in the 2008 Olympic Games in 10 metre air rifle. As a member of the Army Black Knights rifle team, Scherer earned a bronze medal in smallbore and finished in fifth place in air rifle as a freshman at the 2008 NCAA Rifle Championships. Scherer was only 19 and still a plebe (freshman) at West Point when he qualified for the Beijing games. Scherer transferred to Texas Christian University after leaving West Point.

Stephen's younger sister Sarah Scherer competed in the 10 metre air rifle of 2012 Summer Olympics and 2016 Summer Olympics.

== Death ==
Scherer was found dead on October 3, 2010, in his off-campus apartment. The cause of death was ruled to be a self-inflicted gunshot wound.
