= 2012 in shooting =

This article lists the main target shooting events and their results for 2012.

== World Events ==
=== Olympic & Paralympic Games ===
The 2012 Olympic Games & 2012 Paralympic Games were held in London, United Kingdom.

- Shooting at the 2012 Summer Olympics – Qualification
- Shooting at the 2012 Summer Olympics
- Shooting at the 2012 Summer Paralympics – Qualification
- Shooting at the 2012 Summer Paralympics

=== International Shooting Sport Federation ===
- 3–9 June: 2012 World Running Target Championships held in Stockholm, Sweden.

==== ISSF World Cup ====
- 2012 ISSF World Cup

=== International Practical Shooting Confederation ===
- 2012 IPSC Shotgun World Shoot held in Debrecen, Hungary

=== FITASC ===
2012 Results.

== Regional Events ==
=== Asia ===
==== Asian Shooting Championships ====
- 12–18 December: 2012 Asian Airgun Championships held in Nanchang, China.
- 11–22 January: 2012 Asian Shooting Championships held in Doha, Qatar.
- 28 November – 9 December: 2012 Asian Shotgun Championships in Patiala, India.

=== Europe ===
==== European Shooting Confederation ====
- 16–19 February: 2012 European 10 m Events Championships held in Vierumäki, Finland.
- 19–25 May: 2012 European Shotgun Championships in Larnaca, Cyprus.

==== "B Matches" ====
- 4–6 February: InterShoot in Den Haag, Netherlands.
- RIAC held in Strassen, Luxembourg.

== National Events ==
=== United Kingdom ===
==== NRA Imperial Meeting ====
- July, held at the National Shooting Centre, Bisley.
  - Queen's Prize winner: JD Warburton (GBR)
  - Grand Aggregate winner: J Corbett (GBR)
  - Ashburton Shield winners: Wellington College
  - Kolapore Winners: Great Britain (GBR)
  - Junior Kolapore Winners: Sydney City, Australia (AUS)
  - National Trophy Winners: England (ENG)
  - Elcho Shield winners: England (ENG)
  - Vizianagram winners: House of Commons

==== NSRA National Meeting ====
- August, held at the National Shooting Centre, Bisley.
  - Earl Roberts British Prone Champion: G.J. Webb (GBR)

=== USA ===
- 2012 NCAA Rifle Championships, won by TCU Horned Frogs.
