= Greg Seitz =

American athletic director

Current position
- Title: Vice President for Athletics
- Team: Jacksonville State
- Conference: Conference USA

Biographical details
- Education: University of North Alabama

Administrative career (AD unless noted)
- 1993–1999: Jacksonville State (Assistant SID)
- 1999–2002: Jacksonville State (SID)
- 2002–2011: Jacksonville State (Associate AD)
- 2011–2015: Jacksonville State (Senior Associate AD)
- 2015–present: Jacksonville State

Greg Seitz is the current Vice President for Athletics (Director of Athletics) for Jacksonville State University. Seitz graduated from the University of North Alabama in 1993, and served in numerous roles in the Jacksonville State athletic department from 1993 to 2015. After serving as interim athletic director following the retirement of Warren Koegel on December 31, 2014, Seitz was named Jacksonville State's athletic director on a permanent basis on February 26, 2016.
