= 2019 NCAA Rifle Championships =

2019 NCAA Rifle tournament
- Teams: 8
- Format: Points system
- Finals site: (West Virginia) Morgantown, West Virginia; WVU Coliseum
- Champions: TCU Horned Frogs (3rd title)
- Runner-up: West Virginia Mountaineers (28th title game)
- Semifinalists: Air Force Falcons; Murray State Racers
- Winning coach: Karen Monez (3rd title)
- Television: NCAA

The 2019 NCAA Rifle Championships took place from March 8 to March 9 in Morgantown, West Virginia, at the WVU Coliseum. The tournament went into its 40th consecutive NCAA Rifle Championships, and featured eight teams across all divisions.

== Team results ==
- Note: Top 8 only
- (H): Team from hosting U.S. state

Rank	Team	Points
1st place, gold medalist(s)	TCU	4,699
2nd place, silver medalist(s)	West Virginia (H)	4,692
3rd place, bronze medalist(s)	Air Force	4,687
4	Murray State	4,677
5	Kentucky	4,665
6	Army	4,646
7	Navy	4,642
8	Alaska	4,640

== Individual results ==
- Note: Table does not include consolation
- (H): Individual from hosting U.S. State

Games	First	Second	Third
Air rifle details	Kristen Hemphill (Texas) TCU	Angeline Henry (Texas) TCU	Rosemary Kramer (Georgia (U.S. state)) Georgia
Air rifle details	Kristen Hemphill (Texas) TCU	Angeline Henry (Texas) TCU	JT Schnering; Alaska
Smallbore details	Elizabeth Marsh (Texas) TCU	Andre Gross (Ohio) Akron	David Koenders (H); West Virginia
Smallbore details	Elizabeth Marsh (Texas) TCU	Andre Gross (Ohio) Akron	Kristen Hemphill (Texas) TCU
