= Emily Caruso =

American sport shooter

Personal information
- Born: June 4, 1977 (age 49) Stamford, Connecticut, U.S.
- Home town: Fairfield, Connecticut, U.S. Colorado Springs, Colorado, U.S.
- Height: 5 ft 2 in (1.57 m)
- Weight: 115 lb (52 kg)

Sport
- Country: United States
- Sport: Shooting
- Events: 10 m air rifle (AR40); 50 m rifle 3 positions (STR3X20)
- Coached by: David Johnson (national)
Medal record
Women's shooting
Representing the United States
Pan American Games
Gold medal – first place	2011 Guadalajara	AR40

Emily Caruso (born June 4, 1977) is an American sport shooter. She is a two-time Olympian and a gold medalist at the 2011 Pan American Games in Guadalajara, Mexico and was a resident athlete at the U.S. Olympic Training Center in Colorado Springs, Colorado. She was the assistant coach for the TCU Horned Frogs women's rifle team for three seasons and is currently the assistant coach for the Ohio State Buckeyes rifle team.

== Shooting career ==
Caruso started shooting as part of the Police Athletic League (PAL) at the age of eleven. She attended Norwich University in Northfield, Vermont, where she became a member of the university's rifle team. During her time as a college student, Caruso was a four-time All-American in both the air rifle and small-bore categories. She claimed her first ever career title in the individual air rifle at the 1998 NCAA Championships, and followed it with two runner-up finishes in 1999 and in 2000. After she shot for the university's rifle team, Caruso made her international debut at the ISSF World Cup series, where she captured a total of 5 medals (2 silver and 3 bronze) in air rifle and small-bore rifle three positions. In 2000, Caruso graduated from Norwich University with a bachelor's degree in psychology.

Following her graduation, Caruso moved from Connecticut to Colorado Springs, Colorado to work and train as a resident athlete at the U.S. Olympic Training Center. She first competed at the USA Shooting National Championships, where she had won four gold medals (2002, 2005–2007), and set numerous records in the air rifle. Caruso also qualified for the 2004 Summer Olympics in Athens, Greece by winning the air rifle from the U.S. Olympic Team Trials in Fort Benning, Georgia, with a score of 1,397.2, nearly eight points ahead of her teammate Hattie Johnson.

At the 2004 Summer Olympics in Athens, Caruso narrowly missed out of the final in the women's 10 m air rifle, finishing in ninth place for a score of 396 targets. She was also part of a six-person tie for the final three slots, but lost in the tie-breaking procedure by comparing the shooters' last series of targets. Her score of 97 shots on the final attempt was the lowest among the six shooters in the tie.

At the 2008 Summer Olympics in Beijing, Caruso qualified for the second time in the 10 m air rifle by placing second from the U.S. Olympic Team Trials, with a score of 993.7 points. Unlike her previous Olympics, she finished only in fifteenth place by two points behind Norway's Kristina Vestveit from the final attempt, for a total score of 395 targets.

Shortly after the games, Caruso continued her medal streak by winning two bronze in air rifle at the 2009 USA Shooting National Championships, and as a member of the U.S. shooting team, at the 2010 ISSF World Championships in Munich, Germany. In 2011, she set a games record of 497.8 points (396 in the preliminary and 101.8 in the final) by capturing the gold medal in the air rifle at the 2011 Pan American Games in Guadalajara, Mexico. Caruso also sought to qualify for her third consecutive Olympics in London; however, she finished only in third place, and thereby missed out of the slot by nearly two points behind Sarah Scherer (1,792.1) at the U.S. Olympic Team Trials in Port Clinton, Ohio, with an aggregate score of 1,790.
