= Connor Davis =

American football player (born 1994)

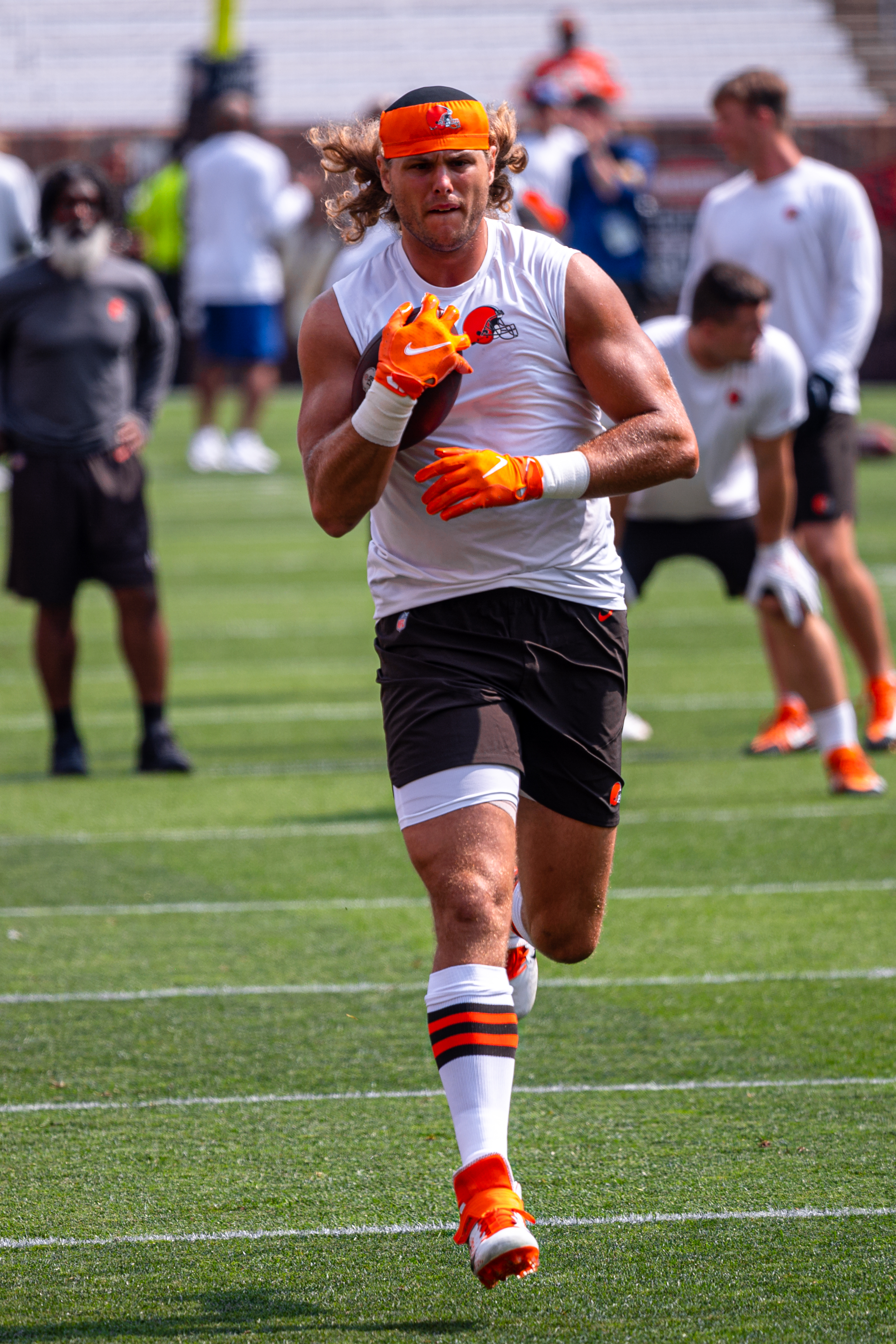
- Davis with the Cleveland Browns in 2021

Profile
- Positions: Tight end, offensive lineman

Personal information
- Born: October 20, 1994 (age 32); Towson, Maryland, U.S.
- Listed height: 6 ft 8 in (2.03 m)
- Listed weight: 260 lb (118 kg)

Career information
- High school: Fallston (Fallston, Maryland)
- College: Stony Brook
- NFL draft: 2018: undrafted

Career history
- Birmingham Iron (2019); St. Louis BattleHawks (2020); New York Jets (2020–2021)*; Cleveland Browns (2021); Michigan Panthers (2022); San Antonio Brahmas (2024)*
- * Offseason or practice squad member only
- Stats at Pro Football Reference

Connor Westley Davis (born October 20, 1994) is an American football tight end and offensive tackle. He played college football at Stony Brook and was signed before the 2019 AAF season by the Birmingham Iron.

== Early career ==
Davis went to Fallston High School in Fallston, Maryland, and played college football at Stony Brook. He played tight end, offensive tackle, and defensive end, catching six passes for 41 yards when he played tight end.

== Professional career ==
Pre-draft measurables
Height	Weight	Arm length	Hand span	40-yard dash	10-yard split	20-yard split	20-yard shuttle	Three-cone drill	Vertical jump	Broad jump	Bench press
6 ft 7 1/2 in (2.02 m)	254 lb (115 kg)	32 5/8 in (0.83 m)	9 7/8 in (0.25 m)	4.81 s	1.70 s	2.81 s	4.59 s	7.44 s	29.5 in (0.75 m)	9 ft 7 in (2.92 m)	17 reps
All values from Pro Day

=== Birmingham Iron ===
Davis was signed by the Birmingham Iron of the Alliance of American Football (AAF) for the 2019 AAF season, being placed on injured reserve during the season.

=== St. Louis BattleHawks ===
Davis was drafted by the St. Louis BattleHawks of the XFL during the 2020 XFL draft, staying with them until the XFL folded.

=== New York Jets ===
On August 15, 2020, Davis signed with the New York Jets. On August 22, he was released by the Jets. On November 13, he was signed to the Jets' practice squad. He was released from the Jets on May 7, 2021.

=== Cleveland Browns ===
On May 23, 2021, Davis signed with the Cleveland Browns. Davis was placed on injured reserve on August 23. Davis was waived from the Browns' injured reserve list on October 16.

=== Michigan Panthers ===
On March 11, 2022, Davis was drafted by the Michigan Panthers of the United States Football League (USFL) in the 2022 USFL supplemental draft. He was transferred to the team's practice squad before the start of the regular season on April 16. Davis remained on the inactive roster on April 22; he was transferred to the active roster on April 30.

=== Houston Roughnecks ===
On December 12, 2023, Davis signed with the Houston Roughnecks of the XFL. This iteration of the Roughnecks folded when the Houston Gamblers became the new iteration of the Roughnecks after the XFL and USFL merged to create the United Football League (UFL).

=== San Antonio Brahmas ===
On February 26, 2024, Davis signed with the San Antonio Brahmas of the United Football League (UFL) as an offensive lineman. He was released on March 10.

== Personal life ==
Davis was born in Towson, Maryland, on October 20, 1994, and was later raised in Fallston, Maryland. He is the son of Don Davis and Tammi Jones. He has one half-sister, Sadie Eser.
