= 2018 NCAA Rifle Championships =

2018 NCAA Rifle tournament
- Teams: 8
- Format: Points system
- Finals site: (South Carolina) Charleston, South Carolina; McAlister Field House
- Champions: Kentucky Wildcats (2nd title)
- Runner-up: West Virginia Mountaineers (27th title game)
- Semifinalists: TCU Horned Frogs; Murray State Racers
- Winning coach: Harry Mullins (2nd title)
- MVP: Henrik Larsen ((Kentucky))
- Television: NCAA

The 2018 NCAA Rifle Championships took place from March 9 to March 10 in Charleston, South Carolina, at the McAlister Field House. The tournament went into its 39th consecutive NCAA Rifle Championships, and featured eight teams across all divisions.

== Team results ==
- Note: Top 8 only
- (H): Team from hosting U.S. state

Rank	Team	Points
1st place, gold medalist(s)	Kentucky	4,717
2nd place, silver medalist(s)	West Virginia	4,708
3rd place, bronze medalist(s)	TCU	4,701
4	Murray State	4,684
5	Air Force	4,669
6	Alaska	4,667
7	Ohio State	4,664
8	Nebraska	4,655

== Individual results ==
- Note: Table does not include consolation
- (H): Individual from hosting U.S. State

Games	First	Second	Third
Air rifle details	Henrik Larsen; Kentucky	Elizabeth Gratz; West Virginia	Ginny Thrasher; West Virginia
Air rifle details	Henrik Larsen; Kentucky	Elizabeth Gratz; West Virginia	Sagen Maddalena; Alaska
Smallbore details	Morgan Phillips; West Virginia	Hanna Carr; Kentucky	Henrik Larsen; Kentucky
Smallbore details	Morgan Phillips; West Virginia	Hanna Carr; Kentucky	Ariana Grabowski (Texas) TCU
