= Christian Heller =

Swedish sports shooter

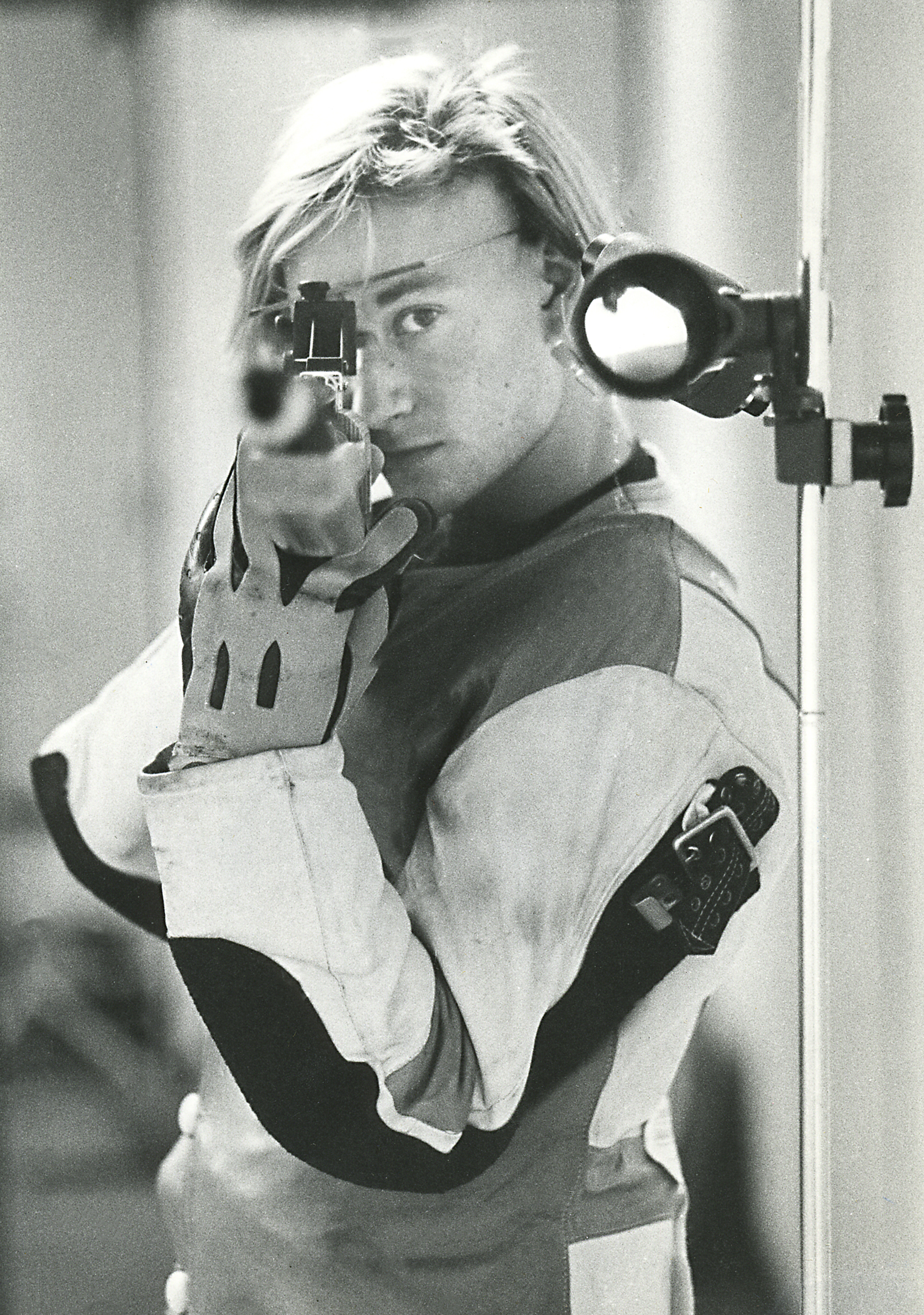
- Member of the WVU rifle team

Personal information
- Nationality: Swedish
- Born: 25 May 1964 (age 60); Uppsala, Sweden

Sport
- Sport: Sports shooting

Christian Heller (born 25 May 1964) is a Swedish sports shooter. He competed in two events at the 1984 Summer Olympics.
