= 2024 NCAA Rifle Championships =

2024 NCAA Rifle tournament
- Teams: 8
- Format: Points system
- Finals site: (West Virginia) Morgantown, West Virginia; WVU Coliseum
- Champions: TCU Horned Frogs (4th title)
- Runner-up: West Virginia Mountaineers
- Semifinalists: Alaska Nanooks; Kentucky Wildcats
- Winning coach: Karen Monez (4th title)
- MVP: Mary Tucker (West Virginia Mountaineers)
- Television: NCAA

The 2024 NCAA Rifle Championships took place from March 8 to March 9 in Morgantown, West Virginia, at the WVU Coliseum. The tournament went into its 45th consecutive NCAA Rifle Championships, and featured eight teams across all divisions.

== Team results ==
- Note: Top 8 only
- (H): Team from hosting U.S. state

Rank	Team	Points
1st place, gold medalist(s)	TCU	4,732
2nd place, silver medalist(s)	West Virginia (H)	4,729
3rd place, bronze medalist(s)	Alaska Fairbanks	4,719
4	Kentucky	4,718
5	Air Force	4,709
6	Navy	4,698
7	Ole Miss	4,693
8	Nebraska	4,680

== Individual results ==
- Note: Table does not include consolation
- (H): Individual from hosting U.S. State

Games	First	Second	Third
Air rifle details	Gavin Barnick (H) (West Virginia) WVU	Braden Peiser; Kentucky	Mary Tucker (H) (West Virginia) WVU
Smallbore details	Mary Tucker (H) (West Virginia) WVU	Katie Zaun (Texas) TCU	Stephanie Grundsøe (Texas) TCU
