= Patriot Rifle Conference =

NCAA rifle-only conference

- Association: NCAA
- Founded: 2013
- Commissioner: Will Anti
- Sports fielded: Rifle
- Division: I
- No. of teams: 6
- Headquarters: Colorado Springs, Colorado

The Patriot Rifle Conference (PRC) is a National Collegiate Athletic Association (NCAA) rifle-only conference. The PRC was established in 2013 for schools that sponsor rifle teams, but do not have rifle as a sponsored sport in their primary conferences.

== Members ==
=== Current members ===
| Institution | Location | Founded | Enrollment | Nickname | Primary Conference |
|---|---|---|---|---|---|
| Air Force | Colorado Springs, CO | 1954 | 4,413 | Falcons | Mountain West Conference |
| Alaska-Fairbanks | Fairbanks, AK | 1917 | 11,034 | Nanooks | Great Northwest Athletic Conference (Div. II) |
| Nebraska | Lincoln, NE | 1869 | 24,431 | Cornhuskers | Big Ten Conference |
| Ohio State | Columbus, OH | 1870 | 56,867 | Buckeyes | Big Ten Conference |
| Ole Miss | Oxford, MS | 1848 | 23,780 | Rebels | Southeastern Conference |
| TCU | Fort Worth, TX | 1873 | 9,725 | Horned Frogs | Big 12 Conference |
| UTEP | El Paso, TX | 1914 | 21,011 | Miners | Mountain West Conference |

== Champions ==
=== PRC Champions ===
The inaugural PRC Championship was held at Ohio State University on February 8 & 9, 2014. The event is held annually around the first weekend of February, prior to the NCAA Tournament qualifiers.

| Year | Location | Conference Champion | Smallbore Champion | Air Rifle Champion |
|---|---|---|---|---|
| 2014 | Columbus, OH | Alaska-Fairbanks | | Alaska-Fairbanks |
| 2015 | Colorado Springs, CO | Alaska-Fairbanks | | TCU |
| 2016 | Fort Worth, TX | TCU | | |
| 2017 | Columbus, OH | TCU | | |
| 2018 | Colorado Springs, CO | TCU | | |
| 2019 | Fairbanks, AK | Air Force | | |
| 2020 | Fort Worth, TX | TCU | | |
| 2021 | Columbus, OH | TCU | | |
| 2022 | Colorado Springs, CO | Alaska-Fairbanks | | |
| 2023 | Fairbanks, AK | TCU | | |
| 2024 | Fort Wayne, IN | TCU | | |
| 2025 | Fort Wayne, IN | Alaska-Fairbanks | | |
| 2026 | Fort Wayne, IN | Nebraska | | |

=== NCAA Champions ===
- Alaska-Fairbanks (10): 1994, 1999, 2000, 2001, 2002, 2003, 2004, 2006, 2007, 2008, 2023
- TCU (3): 2010, 2012, 2019, 2024

== See also ==
- List of NCAA rifle programs
- NCAA Rifle Championship
