= 2017 NCAA Rifle Championships =

2017 NCAA Rifle tournament
- Teams: 8
- Format: Points system
- Finals site: (Ohio) Columbus, Ohio; St. John Arena
- Champions: West Virginia Mountaineers (19th title)
- Runner-up: TCU Horned Frogs (4th title game)
- Semifinalists: Murray State Racers; Kentucky Wildcats
- Winning coach: Jonathan Hammond (6th title)
- MVP: Morgan Phillips ((West Virginia))
- Television: NCAA

The 2017 NCAA Rifle Championships took place from March 9 to March 11 in Columbus, Ohio at the St. John Arena, particularly at the French Field House. The tournament went into its 38th consecutive NCAA Rifle Championships, and featured eight teams across all divisions.

== Team results ==
- Note: Top 8 only
- (H): Team from hosting U.S. state

Rank	Team	Points
1st place, gold medalist(s)	West Virginia	4,723
2nd place, silver medalist(s)	TCU	4,706
3rd place, bronze medalist(s)	Murray State	4,692
4	Kentucky	4,682
5	Alaska	4,676
6	Nebraska	4,676
7	Ohio State (H)	4,670
8	Air Force	4,653

== Individual results ==
- Note: Table does not include consolation
- (H): Individual from hosting U.S. State

Games	First	Second	Third
Air rifle details	Milica Babic; West Virginia	Morgan Phillips; West Virginia	Rachel Garner (Texas) TCU
Air rifle details	Milica Babic; West Virginia	Morgan Phillips; West Virginia	Mindy Miles (Texas) TCU
Smallbore details	Morgan Phillips; West Virginia	Ginny Thrasher; West Virginia	Casey Lutz (Texas) TCU
Smallbore details	Morgan Phillips; West Virginia	Ginny Thrasher; West Virginia	Racher Garner (Texas) TCU
