= Pat Pitney =

American university president and sport shooter

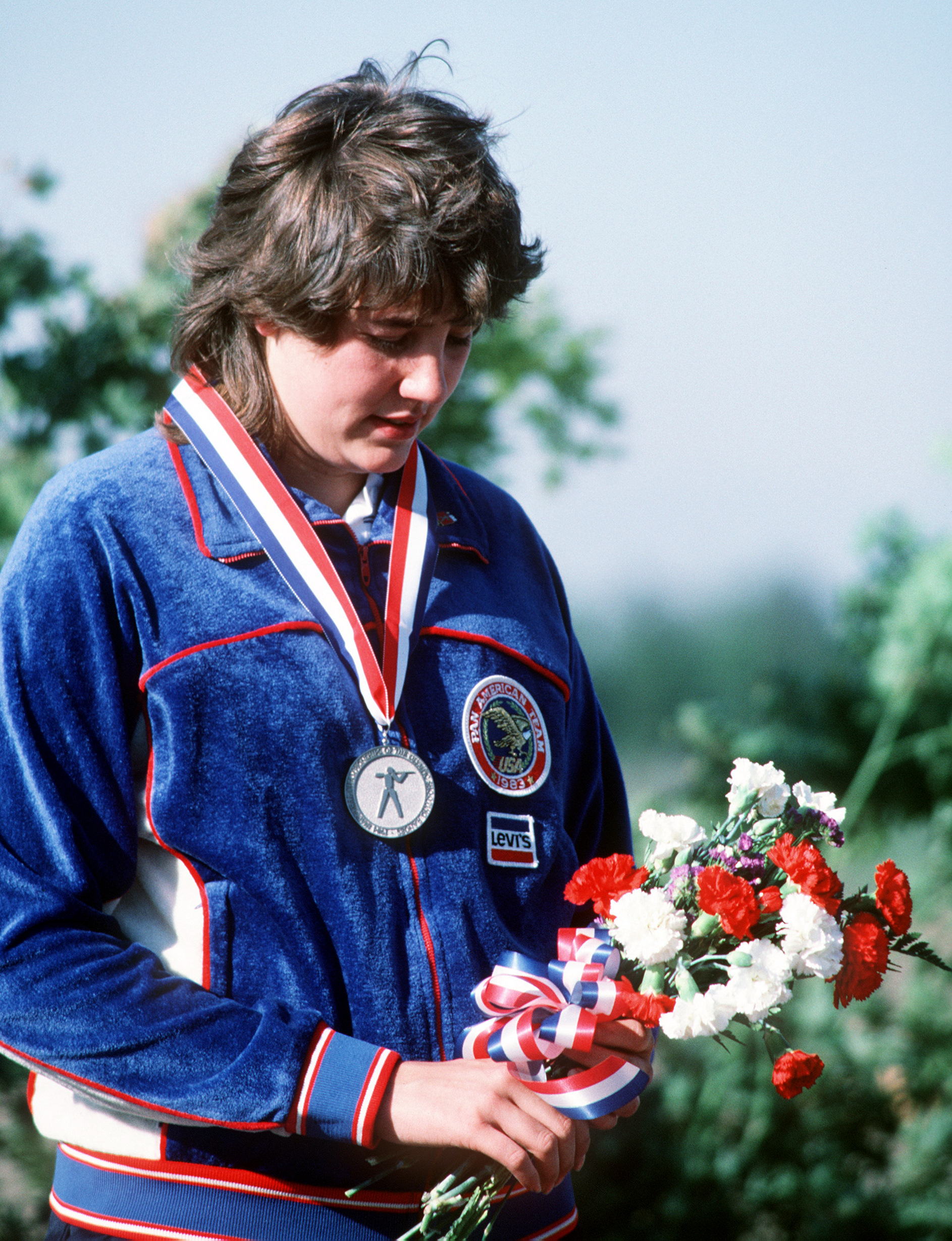
- Pitney in 1984

16th President of the University of Alaska System
- Incumbent
- Assumed office August 1, 2020
- Preceded by: Jim Johnsen; Michelle Rizk (interim)

Personal details
- Born: Karen Patricia Spurgin; August 10, 1965 (age 61) Billings, Montana, U.S.
- Education: Murray State University (BS); University of Alaska, Fairbanks (MBA)
- Sports career
Medal record
Women's shooting
Representing the United States
Olympic Games
Gold medal – first place	1984 Los Angeles	Air rifle

Karen Patricia "Pat" Pitney (née Spurgin; born August 10, 1965) is a retired American university administrator, former Alaska state government official, and Olympic gold medalist. She retired from the presidency of the University of Alaska system.

== Early life and education ==
Born in Billings, Montana, Pitney competed and won a gold medal in the 1984 Summer Olympics. She became the first Olympic Champion in Air Rifle for Women, at the time being an 18-year-old student at Murray State University, Kentucky. The Pat Spurgin Rifle Range at Murray State University is named after her. She earned a degree in engineering physics from Murray State University and a Master of Business Administration from the University of Alaska Fairbanks.

== University of Alaska ==
Pitney held administrative positions at the University of Alaska for 23 years. In 2007, she became vice president for planning and budget at the University of Alaska statewide office. From 2008 to 2014, she was the vice chancellor for administrative services at the University of Alaska Fairbanks. While vice chancellor, she also served as finance vice president for the University of the Arctic, starting in 2012.

Pitney volunteered as an assistant coach for the Alaska Nanooks rifle team at the University of Alaska Fairbanks for almost two decades. The team won nine NCAA Rifle Championships during that time.

== Sochi 2014 Winter Olympic Games ==
Pitney was a torchbearer for the Sochi 2014 Olympics torch relay. She traveled 3,100 miles on the Russian nuclear-powered icebreaker 50 Let Pobedy to the North Pole, where the crew ignited a cauldron with the Olympic torch.

== State of Alaska ==
In December 2014, newly elected Alaska Governor Bill Walker appointed Pitney as director of the Office of Management and Budget During the 2014-2018 Walker administration, Pitney focused on managing the impact of collapsing oil prices on the Alaska state budget. Pitney then became director of the state of Alaska's Legislative Finance Division in January 2020.

== University of Alaska president ==
Pitney became interim president of the University of Alaska system on August 1, 2020. She succeeded acting President Michelle Rizk, who had stepped in after the resignation of President Jim Johnsen on June 22. Pitney's term was originally set to expire when a permanent university president was recruited. However, on January 31, 2022, the chair of the University of Alaska Board of Regents, Sherri Buretta, proposed that the pending recruitment be cancelled and that Pitney be appointed as permanent president, effective immediately. Although faculty, student and staff governance groups all protested their exclusion from the decision-making process, the Board of Regents unanimously accepted the proposal on February 25; Buretta noted that Pitney was the first woman to hold the University of Alaska presidency as a permanent position.

The first year of Pitney's presidency was complicated by the COVID-19 pandemic, which shut down most on-campus activities in the spring of 2020 in favor of remote instruction. Her administration gradually reopened those on-campus activities, with all in-person classes resuming in the fall of 2021.

Pitney inherited an ongoing downsizing of the university system in response to a three-year program of scheduled reductions in financial support from the state of Alaska. Her presidency began at the start of the second year of the reductions. To compensate for reduced funding from the state, Pitney pursued private philanthropists, external grants for research programs, and completion of the University of Alaska's federal land grant endowment. Pitney reported in early 2023 that in the previous year the University of Alaska system had "reached the highest level ever of externally funded research". The completion of the land grant had passed a milestone in December 2022 with the passage of the federal Consolidated Appropriations Act, 2023, which directed the Bureau of Land Management to begin the process of transferring 360,000 acres of federal land to the university.

The Pitney administration's academic focus was on programs which directly benefit the Alaska economy, such as alternative energy, marine farming, health care education, heavy oil recovery, mining of critical minerals, and development of drone aircraft applications. In the face of budget cuts, Pitney pushed forward the Alaska Native Success Initiative, which increases the involvement of Alaskan native students and faculty in University academics. She also oversaw the expansion of the UA Scholars Program and the Alaska Performance Scholarship, which encourage Alaskan high school graduates to attend college in Alaska. During Pitney's presidency, University of Alaska enrollment increased by 4% between fall of 2022 and fall of 2024. Projections for 2025, reported in November 2025, forecast another 4% increase for the year.

On November 13, 2025, Pitney announced that she would retire in May 2026. Her last day on the job was May 21. On that day, the university Board of Regents granted Pitney the title of "President Emeritus", which recognizes "significant, meritorious contributions to the university". As of 2026, only three other presidents of the University of Alaska have been granted president emeritus status since the university's founding in 1917.

== Other activities ==
Pitney joined the Board of Directors of First National Bank Alaska in October 2022.

== Legacy ==
Pitney has been inducted into the USA Shooting Hall of fame.
