= Virginia Thrasher =

American sport shooter

Ginny Thrasher
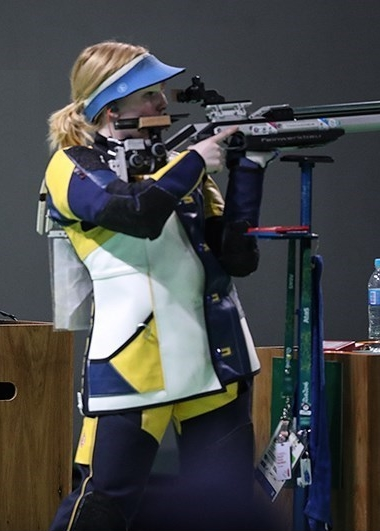
- Thrasher at the 2016 Summer Olympics

Personal information
- Full name: Virginia Thrasher
- Born: February 28, 1997 (age 29) Rome, New York, U.S.
- Education: West Virginia University
- Height: 5 ft 1 in (155 cm)
- Weight: 119 lb (54 kg)

Sport
- Country: United States
- Sport: Shooting
- Events: AR40 (10m air rifle); STR3X20 (50m rifle 3 positions)
- University team: West Virginia Mountaineers

Achievements and titles
- Highest world ranking: 1st (AR40, 2016); 10th (STR3X20, 2016)
Medal record
Event	1st	2nd	3rd
Olympic Games	1	-	-
World Cup Finals	-	-	1
Olympic Games
Gold medal – first place	2016 Rio de Janeiro	10 m air rifle
World Cup Final
Bronze medal – third place	2016 Bologna	10 m air rifle
Pan American Games
Bronze medal – third place	2019 Lima	50 m rifle 3 positions

Virginia "Ginny" Thrasher (born February 28, 1997) is an American sports shooter who won a gold medal in the women's 10 meter air rifle at the 2016 Summer Olympics in Rio de Janeiro, Brazil. She won the first gold medal awarded at the 2016 Olympics.

Thrasher's gold medal came during the first time she had competed in the Olympics, beating two Chinese athletes, previous Olympic gold medalists Du Li and Yi Siling. Thrasher's victory was considered a surprise as she had no major international competition experience prior to the 2016 Olympics.

Before the 2016 Olympics, Thrasher wanted to be a figure skater. She has said she was never any good and by her freshman year of high school, she realized she had no future in it. She switched sports in 2011 after going hunting with her grandfather.

== Personal life ==
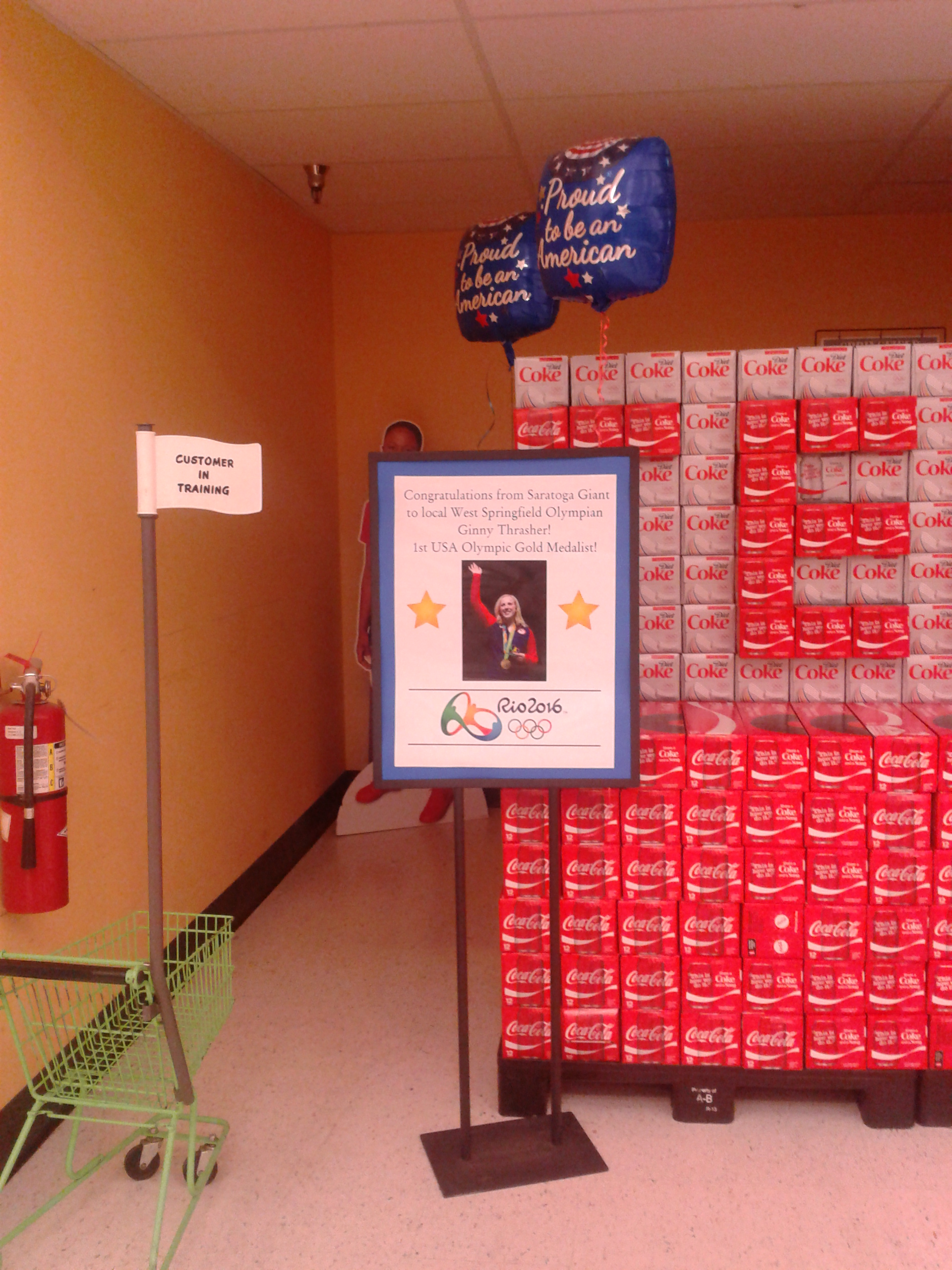
Sign at the Saratoga Giant in Springfield congratulating Thrasher on her victory

Thrasher grew up in Springfield, Virginia, and graduated from West Springfield High School in 2015. She is the daughter of Roger and Valerie Thrasher and has two older brothers. She graduated summa cum laude from West Virginia University in 2019, where she majored in biomedical engineering.

Thrasher serves on the athlete advisory team for Country Roads Trust, a West Virginia-based company formed in 2022 to help student-athletes take advantage of their new ability to monetize their Name, Image, and Likeness. Other WVU alumni on the advisory team include former NBA player Jerry West, former NFL player Pat McAfee, and gymnast Jaida Lawrence Hart.

== 2016 Rio Olympics ==
=== 10m air rifle ===
Thrasher received the first gold medal awarded at the 2016 Summer Olympics in Rio de Janeiro. She qualified 6th in the first round of the women's 10m air rifle competition with a score of 416.3. She went on to win the final of that event with an Olympic Record score of 208.0, one point ahead of silver medalist Du Li of China.

=== 50m rifle three positions ===
Thrasher missed the finals of the 50m rifle three positions by one point, finishing with a score of 581.

== College career ==
Ginny Thrasher was a member of the West Virginia University Rifle Team from 2015-2019. During that time, she earned twelve All-American Honors as well as two NCAA individual titles and two team NCAA team titles.
