= Edward Etzel =

American sport shooter (born 1952)

Edward Fredrick Etzel
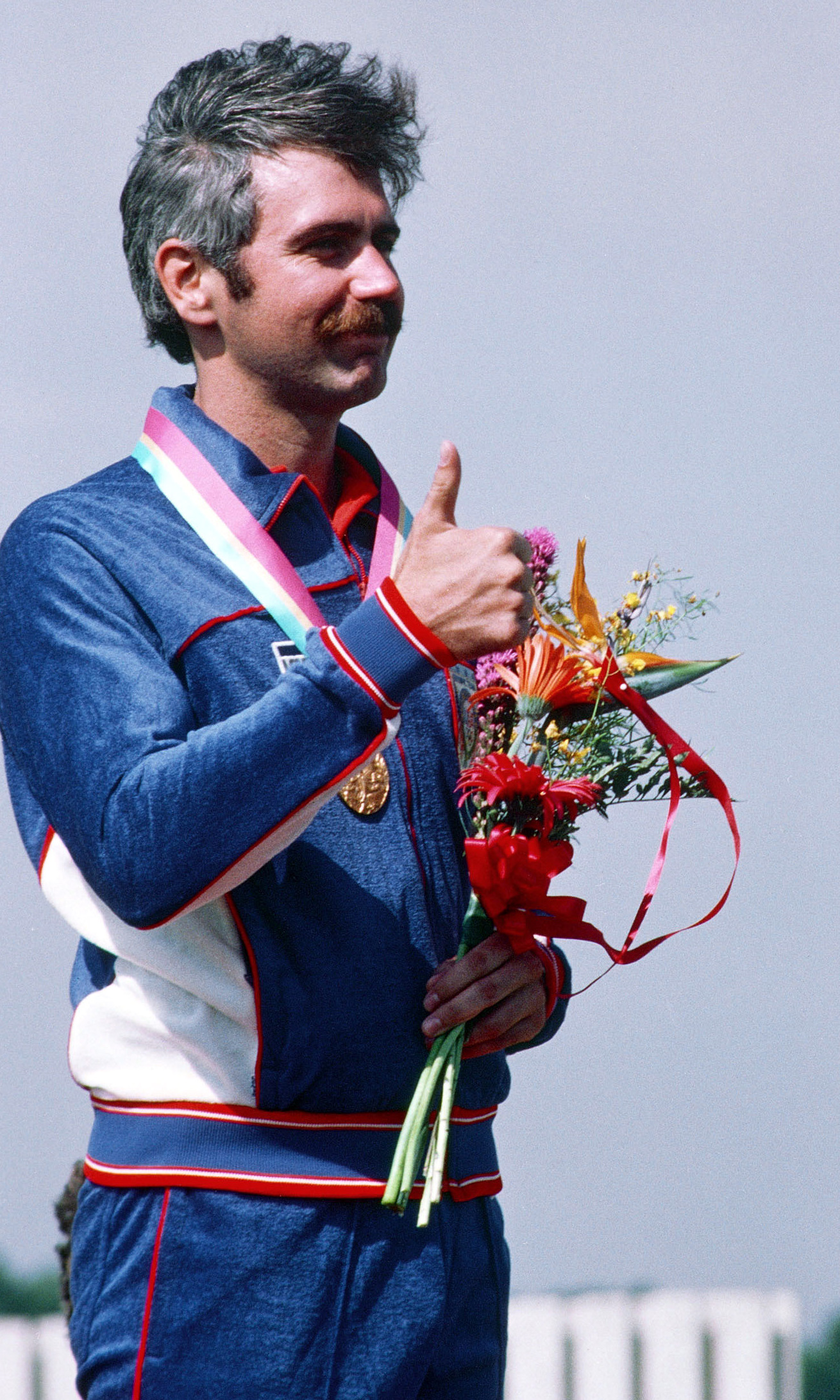
- Etzel in 1984

Personal information
- Full name: Edward Fredrick Etzel, Jr.
- Born: September 6, 1952 (age 74) New Haven, Connecticut, U.S.
Medal record
Men's sport shooting
Representing the United States
Olympic Games
Gold medal – first place	1984 Los Angeles	50 metre rifle prone

Edward Fredrick Etzel, Jr. (born September 6, 1952) is a sport shooter and Olympic champion for the United States. He won a gold medal in the 50 metre rifle prone event at the 1984 Summer Olympics in Los Angeles.

Etzel was born in New Haven, Connecticut . He competed for the U.S. Army team. As of 2016, he is professor of Sport and Exercise Psychology at West Virginia University.

Etzel has been inducted into the USA Shooting Hall of fame.
