= Ann-Marie Pfiffner =

American sports shooter

Personal information
- Born: 13 May 1969 (age 57) Dubuque, Iowa, United States

Sport
- Sport: Sports shooting
Medal record
Representing United States
Pan American Games
Bronze medal – third place	1995 Mar del Plata	10m air rifle

Ann-Marie Pfiffner (née Johnson; born 13 May 1969) is an American sport shooter. She competed in rifle shooting events at the 1992 Summer Olympics.

== Olympic results ==
Event	1992
50 metre rifle three positions (women)	T-12th
