= Jamie Lynn Corkish =

American sport shooter (born 1984)

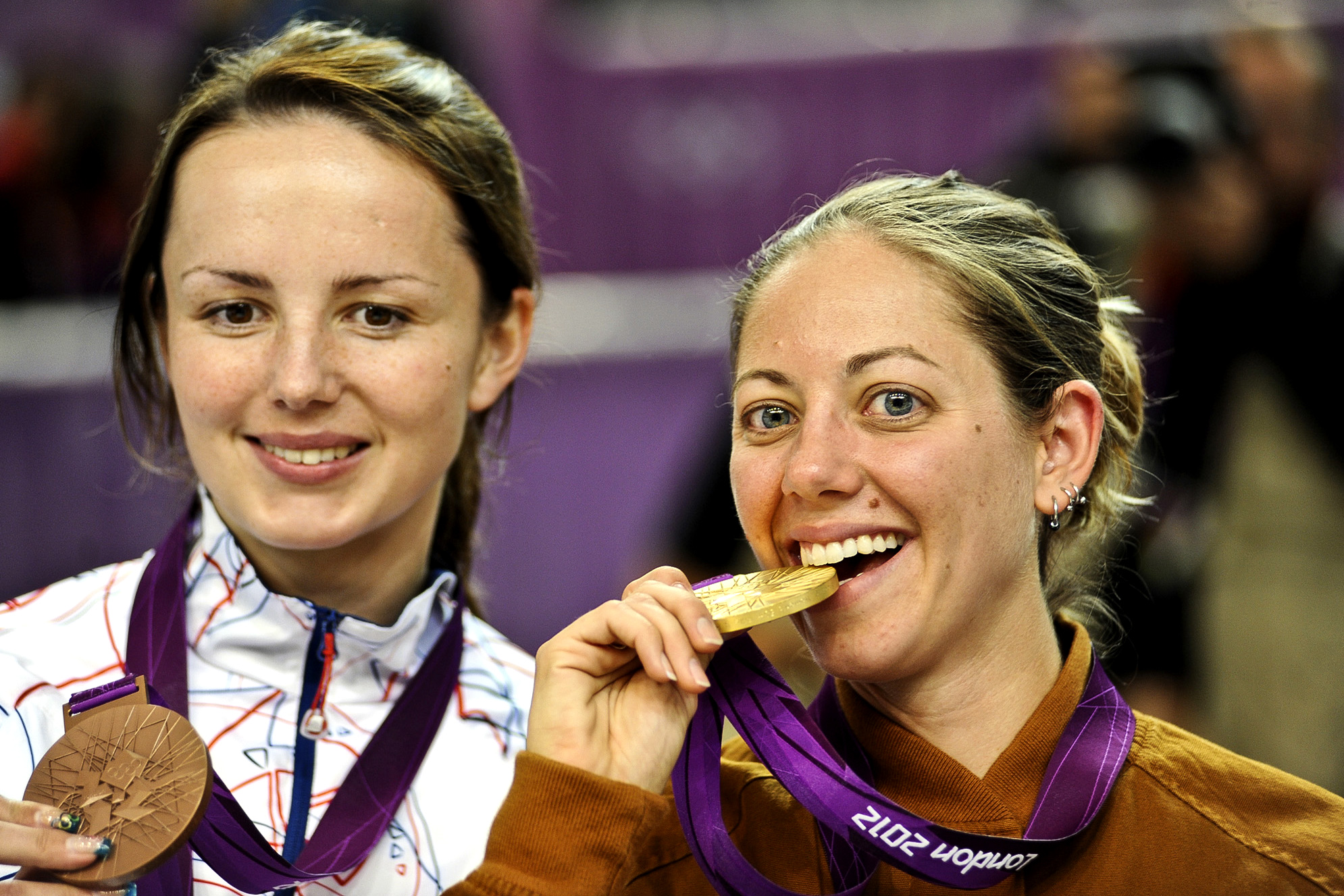
- Jamie Corkish (right) at 2012 Olympics

Personal information
- Full name: Jamie Lynn Corkish
- Nationality: American
- Born: Jamie Lynn Beyerle; May 26, 1984 (age 42) Lebanon, Pennsylvania, U.S.
- Height: 5 ft 2 in (157 cm)
- Weight: 119 lb (54 kg)
- Spouse: Mike Corkish (m. 2014)

Sport
- Country: United States
- Sport: Sport shooting
- Event(s): AR40, STR3X20
- College team: Alaska Nanooks

Achievements and titles
- Olympic finals: 2008, 2012
- Highest world ranking: 1
Medal record
Women's shooting
Representing United States
Olympic Games
Gold medal – first place	2012 London	Women's 50 m rifle three positions
Pan American Games
Gold medal – first place	2007 Rio de Janeiro	Women's 50 m rifle three positions

Jamie Lynn Corkish (formerly Gray, née Beyerle, born May 26, 1984) is an American sport shooter who won a gold medal at the 2012 Summer Olympics.

She was born in Lebanon, Pennsylvania. At the 2008 Summer Olympics, competing as Jamie Beyerle, she placed 4th in Women's 10 metre air rifle and 5th in Women's 50 metre rifle three positions. She placed 2nd at the 2008 ISSF World Cup in Milan. At the 2012 London Olympics, competing as Jamie Gray, she won the gold medal in Women's 50 metre rifle three positions. She set Olympic records with 592 points in the qualification round and 691.9 total points including the final.

Corkish got her start in shooting when she began with a BB gun program at the age of eight. She is a graduate of the University of Alaska Fairbanks and shot for its rifle team.

== Personal life ==
She retired from professional shooting due to a back injury. On November 8, 2014, Jamie married Mike Corkish of Kalispell, Montana. She has two step-children, Morgan and Michael Corkish. Mike and Jamie added to their family when she gave birth to Tristan Corkish on July 14, 2016. Since her retirement Jamie continues to stay close to the shooting sports through individual coaching, volunteering and speaking engagements. She now makes her home in Meridian, Idaho with Mike and their family.
