= Sarah Scherer =

American sport shooter

Personal information
- Nationality: American
- Born: 12 February 1991 (age 35) Salt Lake City, United States
- Height: 170 cm (5 ft 7 in)
- Weight: 63 kg (139 lb)

Sport
- Country: (United States)
- Sport: Sports shooting
- Club: Texas Christian University
- Coached by: Karen Monez

Achievements and titles
- Olympic finals: 7th at 2012 Summer Olympics in Women's 10 metre air rifle

Sarah Scherer (born February 12, 1991, in Salt Lake City) is an American sports shooter. She competed at the 2012 Summer Olympics, finishing in 7th place at Women's 10 metre air rifle. In the same event in the 2016 Summer Olympics in Rio de Janeiro she finished 8th. At the 2016 Summer Olympics, she also competed in the women's 50 m rifle - 3 positions event, finishing in 33rd place. She had previously won a junior silver medal in this event in 2010.

Sarah's elder brother Stephen Scherer was also a sports shooter who competed in the 10 metre air rifle of the 2008 Olympic Games.
