= Xavier Musketeers =

Teams representing Xavier University

- University: Xavier University
- NCAA: Division I
- Conference: Big East (primary) independent (women's lacrosse)
- Athletic director: Greg Christopher
- Location: Evanston, Cincinnati, Ohio
- Varsity teams: 16
- Basketball arena: Cintas Center
- Baseball stadium: J. Page Hayden Field
- Nickname: Musketeers
- Colors: Navy blue, white, and gray
- Mascot: D'Artagnan, Blue Blob
- Website: goxavier.com

The Xavier Musketeers are the 19 teams representing Xavier University in intercollegiate athletics, including men's and women's basketball, cross country, golf, soccer, swimming, tennis, indoor track and field, and outdoor track and field. The Musketeers compete in the NCAA Division I and are members of the Big East Conference. Their official colors are Xavier blue, silver metallic, silver gray and white.

On March 20, 2013, the Xavier administration announced that the university would leave the Atlantic 10 Conference to join the Big East, and it moved to the new conference on July 1, 2013.

== Teams ==
Men's sports	Women's sports
Baseball	Basketball
Basketball	Cross country
Cross country	Golf
Golf	Soccer
Soccer	Swimming
Swimming & diving	Tennis
Tennis	Track & field^{†}
Track & field^{†}	Volleyball
	Lacrosse
† – Track and field includes both indoor and outdoor.

Xavier previously fielded an American football team, but it was discontinued in 1973.

Xavier also fielded a wrestling team that was discontinued in 1978.

Xavier's next sport to be added will be women's lacrosse, which starts play as an independent in the 2023 season (2022–23 school year) before starting Big East play in 2024.

== National championships ==
=== Individual ===
Association	Division	Sport	Year	Event	Individual(s)	Score
NCAA	Single Division	Rifle	1998	Smallbore rifle	Karyn Juziuk	1,169
NCBA	Women's 165-lb.	Boxing	2019	—	Joah Yu	—
