= Jacksonville State Gamecocks =

- University: Jacksonville State University
- NCAA: Division I (FBS)
- Conference: Conference USA
- President: Dr. Don C. Killingsworth Jr.
- Athletic director: Greg Seitz
- Location: Jacksonville, Alabama
- Varsity teams: 15
- Football stadium: AmFirst Stadium
- Basketball arena: Pete Mathews Coliseum
- Baseball stadium: Rudy Abbott Field
- Nickname: Gamecocks
- Colors: Red and white
- Mascot: Cocky
- Website: jaxstatesports.com

The Jacksonville State Gamecocks are the intercollegiate athletic teams of Jacksonville State University located in Jacksonville, Alabama, United States. In January 2023, the university began phasing in a new identity, Jax State, for marketing and promotion purposes, while the institution retains its official name, Jacksonville State University. The Gamecocks athletic program is a member of Conference USA (CUSA), which it joined on July 1, 2023.

The Jax State mascot is Cocky the Gamecock, and the school colors are red and white. Gamecock teams have won seven NCAA national championships in five sports, and, along with Wisconsin–Whitewater, is one of only two schools to win NCAA titles in baseball, basketball, and football.

== History ==
Jacksonville State athletics began with the 1903 State Normal School (SNS) football team and was the domain of men only until women's sports were added in 1982. The SNS teams were known as the Eagle Owls, and the school colors were blue and gold. In 1946, the school's name was changed to Jacksonville Teachers College, and the team name and colors were also changed to the current Gamecocks and red and white.

Prior to the 1993–94 academic year, Jacksonville State competed in NCAA Division II athletics, winning national championships in men's basketball (1985), baseball (1990 and 1991), football (1992) and gymnastics (1984 and 1985).

On July 1, 2021, Jax State moved to the Division I Atlantic Sun Conference, of which it had been a member from 1995 to 2003. The ASUN did not sponsor football, although it announced plans to launch a football league in the near future. Until that time, Jax State was a de facto associate member of the Western Athletic Conference, competing in a football partnership between the two conferences officially branded as the ASUN–WAC Challenge.

On November 5, 2021, Conference USA announced that it would add Jax State beginning in the 2023–24 season. As part of the move, the Jax State football team also moved from Division I FCS to Division I FBS.

== Sports sponsored ==
A member of Conference USA, Jacksonville State University sponsors teams in six men's, 10 women's, and one co-ed NCAA sanctioned sports: The most recently added sport is women's bowling, added in 2023–24. The bowling team won the NCAA title in its first season.

Conference USA logo in Jacksonville State's colors

| Men's sports | Women's sports |
|---|---|
| Baseball | Basketball |
| Basketball | Beach volleyball |
| Cross country | Bowling |
| Football | Cross country |
| Golf | Golf |
| Tennis | Soccer |
| | Softball |
| | Tennis |
| | Track and field^{†} |
| | Volleyball |
Co-ed sports
Rifle
† – Track and field includes both indoor and outdoor.

=== Baseball ===
The Jacksonville State Gamecocks baseball team is a varsity intercollegiate athletic team of Jacksonville State University. The team is a member of Conference USA, which is part of the National Collegiate Athletic Association's Division I.

=== Men's basketball ===
The Jacksonville State Gamecocks men's basketball team is the men's basketball team that represents Jacksonville State University. The school's team currently competes in Conference USA. Their head coach is Ray Harper.

=== Women's basketball ===
The Jacksonville State Gamecocks women's basketball team is the women's basketball team that represents Jacksonville State University. The team currently competes in Conference USA.

=== Football ===
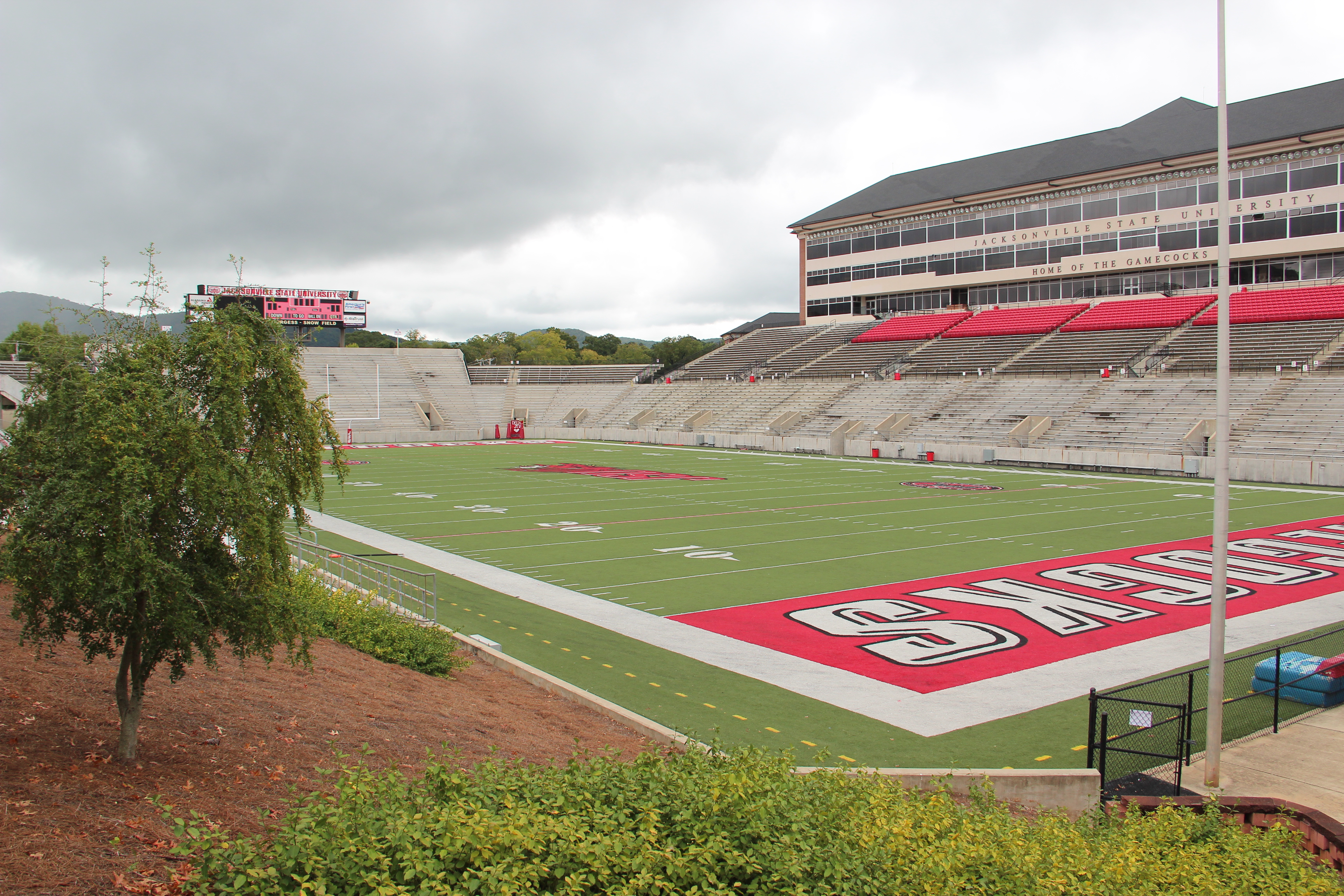
Burgess–Snow Field at JSU Stadium

The Jacksonville State Gamecocks football program is the intercollegiate American football team for Jacksonville State University. The team competes in the NCAA Division I Football Bowl Subdivision (FBS) as a member of Conference USA. Jacksonville State's first football team was fielded in 1904, nicknamed at the time as the "Eagle Owls." The team plays its home games at the 24,000 seat Burgess-Snow Field at JSU Stadium in Jacksonville, Alabama. The Gamecocks hire former Division I football coach Rich "RichRod" Rodriguez for the 2022 season. Rodriguez was previously head coach at football power Michigan (2008–10), as well as West Virginia (2001–07) and Arizona (2012–17).

His luster has dulled in recent years, and he seeks his return to the head coaching circle here at Jax State. He comes from Louisiana Monroe, where he served as the offensive coordinator under head coach Terry Bowden. "RichRod" replaces former Gamecocks head coach John Grass, who resigned after the 2021 season. Grass had a 72–26 record during his tenure as head coach which included 6 Ohio Valley Conference championships. In 2021, the Gamecocks upset the Florida State Seminoles in Tallahassee, Florida on a 59-yard touchdown pass at the end of the game.

The school's football team garnered attention in 2001 when junior (3rd-year) placekicker Ashley Martin became the first female football player to score a point in a Division I game, kicking for 3 points against Cumberland University.

Since 2023, Jax State has been a football member of Conference USA in Division I FBS (Football Bowl Subdivision).

=== Softball ===
The Jacksonville State Gamecocks softball team represents Jacksonville State University in NCAA Division I college softball. The team participates in the Conference USA.

=== Track and field ===
Jacksonville State has fielded a women's-only track and field team since 2001, first coached by Aimee Dawson. Before 2001, the school only competed in cross country and club-level track and field.

== NCAA national championships ==
The school has won the following NCAA championships.

- 1984 Division II Women's Gymnastics
- 1985 Division II Men's Basketball
- 1985 Division II Women's Gymnastics
- 1990 Division II Baseball
- 1991 Division II Baseball
- 1992 Division II Football
- 2024 National Collegiate (Note: "National Collegiate" is the NCAA's official designation of championship events open to members of more than one NCAA division. The bowling championship is currently open to all NCAA members.) Women's Bowling
- 2026 National Collegiate Women's Bowling
