= West Virginia Mountaineers rifle =

American collegiate rifle team

West Virginia Mountaineers
- 2022 West Virginia Mountaineers rifle team
- Founded: 1951
- University: West Virginia University
- Head coach: Jon Hammond (14th season)
- Conference: Great America Rifle
- Location: Morgantown, West Virginia, US
- Colors: Gold and blue

NCAA Team National Champions
- 1983, 1984, 1986, 1988, 1989, 1990, 1991, 1992, 1993, 1995, 1996, 1997, 1998, 2009, 2013, 2014, 2015, 2016, 2017, 2025, 2026

NCAA Team Runners-up
- 1980, 1981, 1982, 1985, 1987, 1994, 2011, 2018, 2019

NCAA Individual Champions – Smallbore
- 1983, 1984, 1986, 1987, 1988, 1992, 1993, 1997, 2013, 2016, 2017, 2018

NCAA Individual Champions – Air Rifle
- 1981, 1982, 1985, 1990, 1991, 1992, 1993, 1996, 2011, 2012, 2013, 2015, 2016, 2017

Conference Tournament championships
- 1999, 2000, 2010, 2011, 2012, 2013, 2014, 2015, 2016, 2017, 2018

Conference Regular Season championships
- 1998, 1999, 2000, 2001, 2003, 2010, 2014, 2015, 2016, 2017, 2018

The West Virginia Mountaineers rifle team is a co-ed intercollegiate varsity sport of West Virginia University. The rifle team participates in NCAA Division I rifle competitions within the rifle-only Great America Rifle Conference.

West Virginia is the most successful college rifle program in the United States, winning a total of 21 NCAA national team championships. They have won 25 individual NCAA championships, produced 65 All-Americans, and 13 Olympians. Jon Hammond serves as the head coach of the rifle team.

== See also ==
- List of NCAA rifle programs
