= List of NCAA rifle programs =

The following is a list of universities and colleges who are members of the National Collegiate Athletic Association (NCAA) and field teams that are eligible to compete in the NCAA rifle championships. There are currently 30 NCAA rifle programs, representing 28 different institutions. The Citadel and VMI field separate co-ed and women's teams.

The NCAA began offering rifle as a varsity sport for the 1979–80 season. The association's rules technically classify rifle as a men's sport, but it has been co-ed since its foundation, and institutions can offer men's, women's, and co-ed teams. NCAA rules stipulate that members of Division I, Division II, and Division III are eligible for the same championship, and as such, teams of each division compete with each other throughout the season.

There are five athletic conferences which offer rifle, three of which are rifle-only. The Mid-Atlantic Rifle Conference (MAC) was formed in 1978, two years prior to the NCAA offering the sport, the Great America Rifle Conference (GARC) was founded in 1997, and the Patriot Rifle Conference (PRC) was founded in 2013. In addition, the all-sports Ohio Valley Conference (OVC) has offered rifle since 1994, while the Southern Conference (SoCon) followed suit in 2016, having previously offered rifle as a varsity sport until 1986.

== Current teams ==
Institution	Nickname	Community	State	Enrollment (2024) (Note: Data sourced from undergraduate enrollment totals provided by the U.S. News & World Report Best Colleges Ranking website)	Division	Type	Current conference (Note: The university's rifle conference, not necessarily its primary athletic conference)	First year	Reference
Air Force	Falcons	Air Force Academy	CO	4,094	I	Coed	PRC	1979	
Akron	Zips	Akron	OH	11,160	I	Coed	GARC	1979	
Alaska	Nanooks	Fairbanks	AK	5,638	II	Coed	PRC	1979	
Army	Black Knights	West Point	NY	4,473	I	Coed	GARC	1979	
Georgia Southern	Eagles	Statesboro	GA	23,618	I	Women	SoCon	2013	
Jacksonville State	Gamecocks	Jacksonville	AL	8,863	I	Coed	Independent	1979	
John Jay	Bloodhounds	New York City	NY	11,939	III	Coed	MAC	1979	
Kentucky	Kentucky	Lexington	KY	25,534	I	Coed	GARC	1979	
Memphis	Tigers	Memphis	TN	15,770	I	Coed	GARC	1993	
MIT	Engineers	Cambridge	MA	4,535	III	Coed	MAC	1979	
Morehead State	Eagles	Morehead	KY	8,258	I	Coed	OVC	1993	
Mount Aloysius	Mounties	Cresson	PA	2,942	III	Coed	MAC	2024	
Murray State	Racers	Murray	KY	8,281	I	Coed	OVC	1979	
Navy	Midshipmen	Annapolis	MD	4,474	I	Coed	GARC	1979	
Nebraska	Cornhuskers	Lincoln	NE	19,701	I	Women	PRC	1998	
North Georgia	Nighthawks	Dahlonega	GA	18,329	II	Coed	SoCon	2011	
Norwich	Cadets	Northfield	VT	2,635	III	Coed	MAC	1979 (Note: Norwich discontinued its rifle program in 2005 and re-established it in 2022)	
Ohio State	Buckeyes	Columbus	OH	46,815	I	Coed	PRC	1979	
Ole Miss	Rebels	Oxford	MS	21,585	I	Women	PRC	1996	
Schreiner	Mountaineers	Kerrville	TX	1,120	III	Coed	MAC	2024	
TCU	Horned Frogs	Fort Worth	TX	11,049	I	Women	PRC	1979	
The Citadel	Bulldogs	Charleston	SC	2,737	I	Coed	SoCon	1979	
The Citadel	Bulldogs	Charleston	SC	2,737	I	Women	SoCon	2015	
UAB	Blazers	Birmingham	AL	11,959	I	Coed	SoCon	1992	
UT Martin	Skyhawks	Martin	TN	6,817	I	Coed	OVC	1980	
UTEP	Miners	El Paso	TX	21,118	I	Women	PRC	1979	
VMI	Keydets	Lexington	VA	1,527	I	Coed (Note: Previously men-only, women were allowed to join starting in 1998, making it a coed team)	SoCon	1979	
VMI	Keydets	Lexington	VA	1,527	I	Women	SoCon	2009	
West Virginia	Mountaineers	Morgantown	WV	18,206	I	Coed	GARC	1979	
Wofford	Terriers	Spartanburg	SC	1,817	I	Coed	SoCon	2003	

== See also ==
- NCAA rifle championships
