= 2023 NCAA Rifle Championships =

- Season: 2022–23
- Teams: 8
- Format: Points System
- Finals site: James A. Rhodes Arena; Akron, Ohio
- Champions: Alaska Fairbanks (11th title)
- Runner-up: TCU (5th runner-up)
- Winning coach: Will Anti (1st title)
- Most Outstanding Performer: Rylan Kissell (Alaska Fairbanks)

The 2023 NCAA Rifle Championships was a tournament held to determine the National Collegiate Athletic Association (NCAA) rifle shooting champions for the 2022–23 season. The 43rd annual edition of the championship was held on March 10 and 11, 2023, at the James A. Rhodes Arena on the campus of the University of Akron in Akron, Ohio, United States.

Alaska Fairbanks won the national championship, ending a 15-year national championship drought, and winning its 11th tournament with a 4729-point aggregate score. TCU finished second with 4717 points, marking the university's fifth runner-up finish in the NCAA championships. Kentucky finished third with 4713 points, they fell to third place after winning the previous two national championships in 2021 and 2022.

Rylan Kissell of Alaska Fairbanks was named the Most Outstanding Performer after finishing first in individual aggregate scoring, with 1,190 points. Cecelia Ossi of Nebraska won the individual smallbore competition with a score of 409.5 points in the finals, while Rylan Kissell of Alaska Fairbanks won the individual air rifle competition with a finals score of 260.9 points.

== Bid selection ==
Teams were selected by averaging their three highest regular-season match aggregate scores and adding that value to their aggregate score at their designated NCAA qualifier event. The top eight teams would be selected to compete in the national championship. The NCAA hosted its selection show for rifle on February 20, 2023.

Team qualifiers for the 2023 NCAA rifle championship
Team	Appearance	Last appearance
Air Force	21st	2022
Alaska Fairbanks	36th	2022
Kentucky	28th	2022
Murray State	35th	2022
Nebraska	16th	2021
Ole Miss	4th	2022
TCU	16th	2022
West Virginia	39th	2022

Five shooters each from the eight selected schools competed in the individual smallbore and air rifle events. Eight individuals from non-qualifying schools also qualified for the national championships based on their marks in their NCAA qualifier event. In the smallbore event, Clark McWhorter of Jacksonville State qualified. In air rifle, Addy Burrow of Georgia Southern, Angeline Henry of Memphis, Elysa Walter of North Georgia, and Gabriela Zych of Memphis qualified. Marleigh Duncan of Navy, Parker Haydin of Navy, and Ben Salas of NC State qualified for both the smallbore and air rifle events.

== Results ==
=== Smallbore ===
Individual smallbore final results
Place	Athlete	Team	Qualifying score	Final score
1st place, gold medalist(s)	Cecelia Ossi	Nebraska	590	409.5 (16)*
2nd place, silver medalist(s)	Will Shaner	Kentucky	591	411.9 (8)*
3rd place, bronze medalist(s)	Mary Tucker	West Virginia	592	409.3
4	Gavin Barnick	Alaska Fairbanks	589	356.6
5	Rylan Kissell	Alaska Fairbanks	590	356.3
6	Lea Horvath	Ole Miss	589	303.4
7	Emma Pereira	Ole Miss	589	302.3
8	Malori Brown	West Virginia	588	252.1

*Score from gold medal match

Team smallbore results
Place	Team	Aggregate score	Centers
1st place, gold medalist(s)	Alaska Fairbanks	2349	151
2nd place, silver medalist(s)	Ole Miss	2346	134
3rd place, bronze medalist(s)	West Virginia	2343	148
4	Nebraska	2340	141
5	Kentucky	2340	139
6	TCU	2338	137
7	Air Force	2322	122
8	Murray State	2322	116

=== Air rifle ===
Individual air rifle final results
Place	Athlete	Team	Qualifying score	Final score
1st place, gold medalist(s)	Rylan Kissell	Alaska Fairbanks	600	260.9 (17)*
2nd place, silver medalist(s)	Mary Tucker	West Virginia	598	261.3 (9)*
3rd place, bronze medalist(s)	Rachael Charles	Alaska Fairbanks	598	259.8
4	Angeline Henry	Memphis	596	205.3
5	Elysa Walter	North Georgia	596	205.5
6	Peninah D'Souza	Air Force	596	204.9
7	Katie Zaun	TCU	597	153.2
8	Julie Johannessen	TCU	599	152.2

*Score from gold medal match

Team air rifle results
Place	Team	Aggregate score	Centers
1st place, gold medalist(s)	Alaska Fairbanks	2380	192
2nd place, silver medalist(s)	TCU	2379	193
3rd place, bronze medalist(s)	Air Force	2375	179
4	Kentucky	2373	185
5	Ole Miss	2367	178
6	Nebraska	2366	180
7	Murray State	2366	167
8	West Virginia	2365	177

=== Final ===
Following the air rifle results, Alaska Fairbanks emerged as the tournament's winner, securing their first championship since 2008 with an aggregate score of 4729. The win marked 11 tournament wins for the Nanooks, with this being their first title under head coach Will Anti. TCU finished second with a 4717 score, marking the fifth runner-up finish in the Horned Frogs' history. Kentucky rounded out the podium in third place, with a score of 4713.

Kentucky and Ole Miss finished tied at 4713; the Wildcats won third place due to their higher number of center shots, leaving the Rebels in fourth. West Virginia finished in fifth with a score of 4708. Nebraska finished in sixth with 4706, and Air Force finished seventh with 4697. Finally, Murray State finished in eighth place with a score of 4688.

Team final results
Place	Team	Smallbore aggregate	Air rifle aggregate	Total aggregate	Centers
1st place, gold medalist(s)	Alaska Fairbanks	2349	2380	4729	343
2nd place, silver medalist(s)	TCU	2338	2379	4717	330
3rd place, bronze medalist(s)	Kentucky	2340	2373	4713	324
4	Ole Miss	2346	2367	4713	312
5	West Virginia	2343	2365	4708	325
6	Nebraska	2340	2366	4706	321
7	Air Force	2322	2375	4697	301
8	Murray State	2322	2366	4688	283

In the individual competition, Rylan Kissell of Alaska Fairbanks was named the Most Outstanding Performer of the championship, with an aggregate score of 1190 (590 in smallbore and 600 in air rifle). During air rifle qualifications, he shot a perfect score with 58 center-tens to establish a new NCAA Championship record.

Individual shooter final results
Place	Athlete	Team	Smallbore aggregate	Air rifle aggregate	Total aggregate	Centers
1st place, gold medalist(s)	Rylan Kissell	Alaska Fairbanks	590	600	1190	101
2nd place, silver medalist(s)	Mary Tucker	West Virginia	592	598	1190	94
3rd place, bronze medalist(s)	Julie Johannessen	TCU	586	599	1185	84
4	Cecelia Ossi	Nebraska	590	593	1183	93
5	Mitchell Nelson	Kentucky	587	595	1182	91
6	Will Shaner	Kentucky	589	593	1182	83
7	Kristen Derting	Ole Miss	588	594	1182	78
8	Katie Zaun	TCU	584	597	1181	88
9	Rachael Charles	Alaska Fairbanks	583	598	1181	84
10	Stephanie Grundsøe	TCU	585	595	1180	82
11	Scott Rockett	Air Force	586	593	1179	79
12	Emma Pereira	Ole Miss	588	591	1179	77
13	Gavin Barnick	Alaska Fairbanks	588	590	1178	82
14	Richard Clark	Kentucky	582	596	1178	81
15	Tori Watts	Nebraska	584	594	1178	79
16	Matias Kiuru	Murray State	585	593	1178	75
17	Martina Gratz	Ole Miss	582	595	1177	77
18	Marleigh Duncan	Navy	582	594	1176	78
19	Lea Horvath	Ole Miss	588	587	1175	80
20	Malori Brown	West Virginia	589	586	1175	79
20	Madelynn Erickson	Nebraska	585	590	1175	79
22	Peter Fiori	Alaska Fairbanks	588	587	1175	77
23	Peninah D'Souza	Air Force	578	596	1174	79
24	Parker Haydin	Navy	584	590	1174	73
25	Kellen Mcaferty	Alaska Fairbanks	582	592	1174	72
26	Lauren Hurley	Air Force	579	594	1173	69
27	John Blanton	Murray State	581	591	1172	69
28	Kristen Hemphill	TCU	583	588	1171	76
28	Molly McGhin	West Virginia	583	588	1171	76
30	Jordan Williams	Air Force	579	592	1171	72
31	Ben Salas	NC State	585	586	1171	70
32	Morgan Kreb	Air Force	578	592	1170	71
33	Emma Rhode	Nebraska	581	589	1170	70
34	Scott Patterson	Murray State	577	593	1170	69
35	Matt Sanchez	West Virginia	578	591	1169	68
36	Allison Henry	Murray State	579	589	1168	70
37	Tal Engler	West Virginia	579	588	1167	76
38	Martin Voss	Kentucky	582	583	1165	65
39	Allison Buesseler	Kentucky	574	589	1163	64
40	Paola Paravati	Murray State	574	588	1162	60
41	Mackenzie Strauch	Nebraska	576	583	1159	64
42	M'Leah Lambdin	Ole Miss	567	582	1149	56
–	Elysa Walter	North Georgia	–	596	596	53
–	Angeline Henry	Memphis	–	596	596	48
–	Gabriela Zych	Memphis	–	595	595	50
–	Addy Burrow	Georgia Southern	–	591	591	46
–	Abby Gordon	TCU	583	–	583	34
–	Clark McWhorter	Jacksonville State	569	–	569	27
