= 2022 NCAA Rifle Championships =

- Season: 2021–22
- Teams: 8
- Format: Points System
- Finals site: Clune Arena; Air Force Academy, Colorado
- Champions: Kentucky (4th title)
- Runner-up: TCU (4th runner-up)
- Winning coach: Harry Mullins (4th title)
- Most Outstanding Performer: Mary Tucker (Kentucky)

The 2022 NCAA Rifle Championships was a tournament held to determine the National Collegiate Athletic Association (NCAA) rifle shooting champions for the 2021–22 season. The 42nd annual edition of the championship was held on March 11 and 12, 2022, at the Clune Arena on the campus of United States Air Force Academy in Air Force Academy, Colorado, United States.

Kentucky repeated as national champions, winning its 4th tournament with a 4739-point aggregate score. TCU finished second with 4736 points, marking the university's fourth runner-up finish in the NCAA championships. Alaska Fairbanks finished third with 4733 points, marking their best finish since 2015 when they finished in second place.

Mary Tucker of Kentucky was named the Most Outstanding Performer after finishing first in individual aggregate scoring, with 1,191 points. Will Shaner of Kentucky won the individual smallbore competition with a score of 459.7 points in the finals, while Scott Rockett of Air Force won the individual air rifle competition with a finals score of 250.2 points.

== Bid selection ==
Teams were selected by averaging their three highest regular-season match aggregate scores and adding that value to their aggregate score at their designated NCAA qualifier event. The top eight teams would be selected to compete in the national championship. The NCAA hosted its selection show for rifle on February 22, 2022.

Team qualifiers for the 2022 NCAA rifle championship
Team	Appearance	Last appearance
Air Force	20th	2021
Alaska Fairbanks	35th	2021
Kentucky	27th	2021
Murray State	34th	2019
Navy	28th	2019
Ole Miss	3rd	2021
TCU	15th	2021
West Virginia	38th	2021

Five shooters each from the eight selected schools competed in the individual smallbore and air rifle events. Eight individuals from non-qualifying schools also qualified for the national championships based on their marks in their NCAA qualifier event. In the smallbore event, Kaylene Castillo of Memphis, Victor Kiss of Ohio State, Cecelia Ossi of Nebraska, and Claudia Sigel of Army qualified. In air rifle, Angeline Henry of Memphis, Derek Keiser of Ohio State, and Mackenzie VanPatten of Jacksonville State qualified. Andre Gross of Akron qualified for both the smallbore and air rifle events.

== Results ==
=== Smallbore ===
Individual smallbore final results
Place	Athlete	Team	Qualifying score	Final score
1st place, gold medalist(s)	Will Shaner	Kentucky	592	459.7
2nd place, silver medalist(s)	Mary Tucker	Kentucky	593	458.7
3rd place, bronze medalist(s)	Rylan Kissell	Alaska Fairbanks	591	448.3
4	Kristen Hemphill	TCU	589	437.9
5	Abby Gordon	TCU	589	426.4
6	Daniel Enger	Alaska Fairbanks	589	415.8
7	Kristen Derting	Ole Miss	589	403.4
8	Richard Clark	Kentucky	589	399.7

Team smallbore results
Place	Team	Aggregate score	Centers
1st place, gold medalist(s)	Kentucky	2360	144
2nd place, silver medalist(s)	Alaska Fairbanks	2351	121
3rd place, bronze medalist(s)	TCU	2350	131
4	Air Force	2342	124
5	Ole Miss	2337	123
6	Murray State	2326	107
7	West Virginia	2320	116
8	Navy	2303	100

=== Air rifle ===
Individual air rifle final results
Place	Athlete	Team	Qualifying score	Final score
1st place, gold medalist(s)	Scott Rockett	Air Force	598	250.2
2nd place, silver medalist(s)	Mary Tucker	Kentucky	598	248.9
3rd place, bronze medalist(s)	Kristen Hemphill	TCU	597	226.4
4	Kristen Derting	Ole Miss	596	205.3
5	Kellen McAferty	Alaska Fairbanks	597	183.9
6	Stephanie Grundsøe	TCU	598	162.4
7	Daniel Enger	Alaska Fairbanks	597	141.6
8	Natalie Perrin	West Virginia	596	120.6

Team air rifle results
Place	Team	Aggregate score	Centers
1st place, gold medalist(s)	TCU	2386	203
2nd place, silver medalist(s)	Alaska Fairbanks	2382	190
3rd place, bronze medalist(s)	West Virginia	2380	200
4	Kentucky	2379	185
5	Navy	2378	190
6	Ole Miss	2376	192
7	Air Force	2370	188
8	Murray State	2361	166

=== Final ===
Following the air rifle results, Kentucky emerged as the tournament's winner, reprising their finish in the 2021 edition with an aggregate score of 4739. The win marked four tournament wins for the Wildcats, which have all come under head coach Harry Mullins. TCU finished second with a 4736 score, marking the fourth runner-up finish in the Horned Frogs' history. Alaska Fairbanks rounded out the podium in third place, with a score of 4733.

Ole Miss finished in fourth place with a score of 4713 which was one point higher than Air Force who finished with a score of 4712 placing them in fifth place. West Virginia finished in sixth with a score of 4700. Murray State finished in seventh with 4687, and Navy finished eighth with 4681.

Team final results
Place	Team	Smallbore aggregate	Air rifle aggregate	Total aggregate	Centers
1st place, gold medalist(s)	Kentucky	2360	2379	4739	329
2nd place, silver medalist(s)	TCU	2350	2386	4736	334
3rd place, bronze medalist(s)	Alaska Fairbanks	2351	2382	4733	311
4	Ole Miss	2337	2376	4713	315
5	Air Force	2342	2370	4712	312
6	West Virginia	2320	2380	4700	316
7	Murray State	2326	2361	4687	273
8	Navy	2303	2378	4681	290

In the individual competition, Mary Tucker of Kentucky was named the Most Outstanding Performer of the championship, with an aggregate score of 1191 (593 in smallbore and 598 in air rifle).

Individual shooter final results
Place	Athlete	Team	Smallbore aggregate	Air rifle aggregate	Total aggregate	Centers
1st place, gold medalist(s)	Mary Tucker	Kentucky	593	598	1191	86
2nd place, silver medalist(s)	Will Shaner	Kentucky	592	595	1187	84
3rd place, bronze medalist(s)	Rylan Kissell	Alaska Fairbanks	591	596	1187	82
4	Stephanie Grundsøe	TCU	588	598	1186	81
5	Kristen Hemphill	TCU	589	597	1186	76
6	Daniel Enger	Alaska Fairbanks	589	597	1186	76
7	Kristen Derting	Ole Miss	589	596	1185	84
8	Scott Rockett	Air Force	587	598	1185	84
9	Richard Clark	Kentucky	589	594	1183	75
10	Kellen McAferty	Alaska Fairbanks	586	597	1183	73
11	Abby Gordon	TCU	589	593	1182	76
12	Lea Horvath	Ole Miss	583	596	1179	78
13	Andre Gross	Akron	585	594	1179	74
14	Matias Kiuru	Murray State	583	596	1179	68
15	Akihito Shimizu	West Virginia	583	595	1178	79
16	Stephanie Allan	TCU	582	596	1178	72
17	Morgan Kreb	Air Force	585	592	1177	78
18	Tal Engler	West Virginia	581	596	1177	72
19	Peninah D'Souza	Air Force	586	590	1176	74
20	Michael Zanti	Navy	582	594	1176	71
21	John Blanton	Murray State	583	593	1176	69
22	Jillian Zakrzeski	Ole Miss	582	593	1175	77
23	Gavin Barnick	Alaska Fairbanks	585	590	1175	69
24	Peter Fiori	Air Force	584	590	1174	74
25	Claire O'Neel	Ole Miss	583	591	1174	72
26	Nina Schuett	TCU	575	598	1173	69
27	Scott Patterson	Murray State	579	594	1173	61
28	Verena Zaisberger	West Virginia	578	594	1172	68
29	Emmie Sellers	Kentucky	579	592	1171	67
30	Marleigh Duncan	Navy	574	596	1170	71
31	Molly McGhin	West Virginia	575	595	1170	70
32	Natalie Perrin	West Virginia	573	596	1169	72
33	Jaden Thompson	Kentucky	586	583	1169	69
34	Clarissa Layland	Navy	573	596	1169	68
35	Stephanie Milvain	Navy	574	592	1166	63
36	Jordan Williams	Air Force	574	590	1164	60
37	Martina Gratz	Ole Miss	573	591	1164	58
38	Jessica Boyce	Alaska Fairbanks	571	590	1161	58
39	Allison Henry	Murray State	571	588	1159	58
40	Dana Buesseler	Murray State	574	583	1157	56
41	Deonte Hayes	Navy	567	582	1149	53
–	Derek Keiser	Ohio State	–	596	596	45
–	Angeline Henry	Memphis	–	595	595	47
–	Mackenzie VanPatten	Jacksonville State	–	595	595	47
–	Kaylene Castillo	Memphis	587	–	587	32
–	Cecelia Ossi	Nebraska	587	–	587	32
–	Viktor Kiss	Ohio State	585	–	585	35
–	Claudia Sigel	Army	581	–	581	22
