= 2026 NCAA Rifle Championships =

- Season: 2025–26
- Teams: 8
- Finals site: Covelli Center; Columbus, Ohio
- Champions: West Virginia (21st title)
- Runner-up: TCU (7th runner-up)
- Winning coach: Jon Hammond (8th title)
- Most Outstanding Performer: Griffin Lake (West Virginia)

The 2026 NCAA Rifle Championships was a tournament held to determine the National Collegiate Athletic Association (NCAA) rifle shooting champions for the 2025–26 season. The 46th annual edition of the championship was held on March 13 and 14, 2026, at the Covelli Center on the campus of Ohio State University in Columbus, Ohio, United States.

West Virginia repeated as national champions, winning its 21st tournament with a 4748-point aggregate score. TCU finished second with 4741 points, marking the university's seventh runner-up finish in the NCAA championships. Ole Miss finished third with 4738 points, tying its best-ever finish in a national championship.

Griffin Lake of West Virginia was named the Most Outstanding Performer after finishing first in individual aggregate scoring, with 1,194 points. He finished second in the aggregate in both the smallbore and air rifle competitions, with 595 and 599 points, respectively. Braden Peiser of Kentucky won the individual smallbore competition with an NCAA record-tying aggregate of 596 points, while Audrey Gogniat won the individual air rifle competition with a perfect aggregate score of 600 points. Gogniat's win marked her second consecutive individual air rifle championship.

== Bid selection ==
Teams were selected by averaging their three highest regular-season match aggregate scores and adding that value to their aggregate score at their designated NCAA qualifier event. The top eight teams would be selected to compete in the national championship. The NCAA hosted its selection show for rifle on February 23.

Team qualifiers for the 2026 NCAA rifle championship
Team	Appearance	Last appearance
Alaska	39th	2025
Georgia Southern	2nd	2025
Kentucky	31st	2025
Navy	30th	2024
Nebraska	21st	2024
Ole Miss	7th	2025
TCU	19th	2025
West Virginia	42nd	2025

Five shooters each from the eight selected schools competed in the individual smallbore and air rifle events. Eight individuals from non-qualifying schools also qualified for the national championships based on their marks in their NCAA qualifier event. In the smallbore event, Addison Antweiler of Army, Katrina Demerle of Memphis, and Carlotta Salafia and Lea Soulé of Murray State qualified. In air rifle, Lily Wytko and Lily Martin of Air Force, Caroline Martin of Murray State, and Kameron Wells of UTEP qualified.

== Results ==
=== Smallbore ===
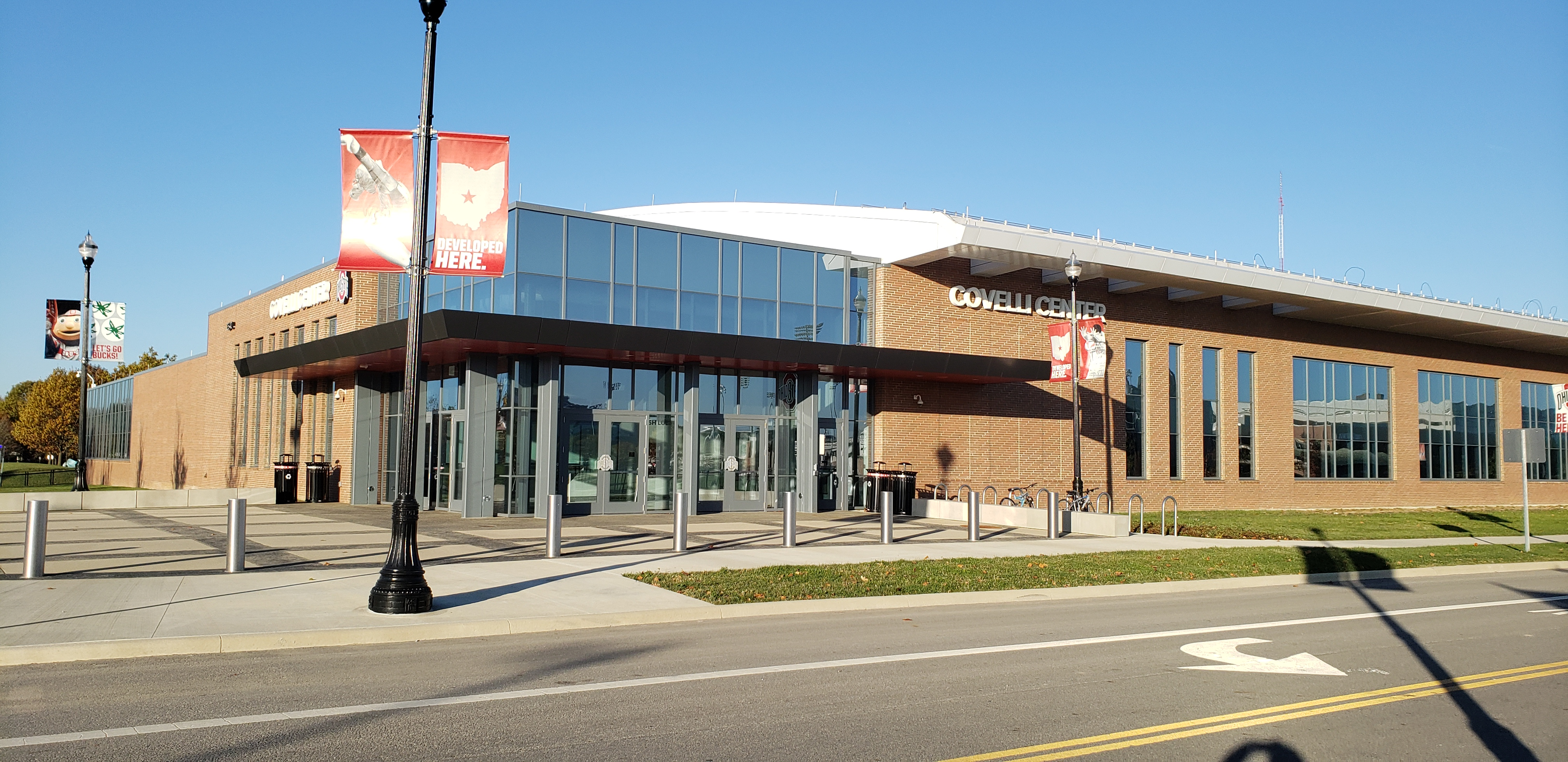
The 2026 championship was held at the Covelli Center on the campus of Ohio State University in Columbus, Ohio.

Day one of the event, held on March 13 at the Covelli Center in Columbus, Ohio, saw the smallbore competition take place. Braden Peiser of Kentucky had the top aggregate score in the qualifying round, a mark of 596, heading into the individual smallbore final. Peiser's 596 mark tied the NCAA Championships record for smallbore. Qualifying alongside Peiser for the final individual competition was Kentucky teammate Elizabeth Probst, Ole Miss shooters Audrey Gogniat and Gracie Dinh, West Virginia shooters Griffin Lake and Océanne Muller, TCU shooter Katie Zaun, and Nebraska shooter Emma Rhode.

Peiser led for nearly all of the final. Dinh and Rhode were first eliminated, with scores of 405.9 and 406.3, respectively. Muller was next eliminated with a score of 419.9, good for a sixth-place finish. Zaun finished fifth, eliminated next with a score of 430.3, before Probst was eliminated with a score of 441.8 for a fourth-place finish. This left Peiser, Gogniat, and Lake as the podium field. Lake was next to be eliminated, and finished third with a score of 452.6, leaving Peiser and Gogniat as the final two remaining. After the shootout final, Peiser emerged as the winner, firing a mark of 466.0 in the final compared to Gogniat's 464.4.

Individual smallbore final results
Place	Athlete	Team	Qualifying score	Final score
1st place, gold medalist(s)	Braden Peiser	Kentucky	596	466.0
2nd place, silver medalist(s)	Audrey Gogniat	Ole Miss	592	464.4
3rd place, bronze medalist(s)	Griffin Lake	West Virginia	595	452.6
4	Elizabeth Probst	Kentucky	592	441.8
5	Katie Zaun	TCU	593	430.3
6	Océanne Muller	West Virginia	592	419.9
7	Emma Rhode	Nebraska	591	406.3
8	Gracie Dinh	Ole Miss	593	405.9

As a team, Ole Miss emerged as the day one winner, with an aggregate score of 2356. TCU and Nebraska tied for second behind the Rebels, with 2354 points. TCU, however, had more centers than Nebraska, giving the Horned Frogs the second spot and the Cornhuskers third.

Team smallbore results
Place	Team	Aggregate score	Centers
1st place, gold medalist(s)	Ole Miss	2356	142
2nd place, silver medalist(s)	TCU	2354	147
3rd place, bronze medalist(s)	Nebraska	2354	128
4	West Virginia	2353	144
5	Kentucky	2353	131
6	Navy	2346	126
7	Georgia Southern	2338	118
8	Alaska	2334	119

=== Air rifle ===
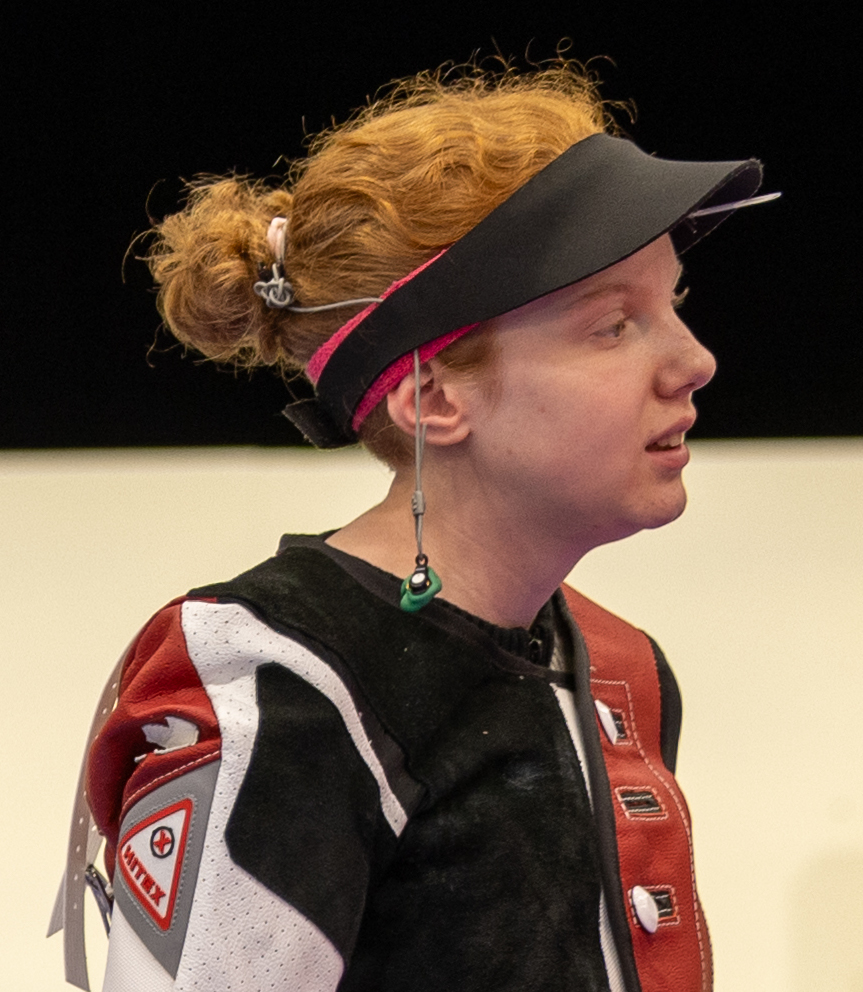
Audrey Gogniat of Ole Miss won the individual air rifle championship in 2026.

Day two of the event, held on March 14 at the Covelli Center, saw the air rifle competition take place. At the end of the qualifying round, Ole Miss' Audrey Gogniat held the leading aggregate score, with a perfect 600 mark. The perfect mark was the fourth such score in her career, becoming the third person in NCAA history to record four perfect scores in air rifle competition. Also qualifying for the final were West Virginia shooters Griffin Lake, Océanne Muller, and Jennifer Kocher, TCU's Mikole Hogan and Katie Zaun, Nebraska's Katlyn Sullivan, and Georgia Southern's Tori Watts.

In the air rifle final, first eliminated was Watts of Georgia Southern with a score of 122.7, good for eighth place. Kocher of West Virginia finished seventh with a score of 144.1. The pair of TCU shooters finished sixth and fifth- Zaun recorded a score of 166.2, while Hogan recorded a 187.3 mark. Muller of West Virginia finished fourth with 208.2, leaving fellow West Virginian Lake, Gogniat of Ole Miss, and Sullivan of Nebraska as the podium field.

In the final three, Sullivan held the lead, while Lake held the second place spot. On the 22nd shot, however, Gogniat took over the second spot, which she held to advance to the shootout with Sullivan. Lake finished in third, with a score of 229.2. In the shootout, Sullivan led by as many as two points, but Gogniat came back to claim her second straight air rifle crown. Sullivan finished second with 249.9 points, while Gogniat won with 251.0.

Individual air rifle final results
Place	Athlete	Team	Qualifying score	Final score
1st place, gold medalist(s)	Audrey Gogniat	Ole Miss	600	251.0
2nd place, silver medalist(s)	Katlyn Sullivan	Nebraska	599	249.9
3rd place, bronze medalist(s)	Griffin Lake	West Virginia	599	229.2
4	Océanne Muller	West Virginia	599	208.2
5	Mikole Hogan	TCU	598	187.3
6	Katie Zaun	TCU	598	166.2
7	Jennifer Kocher	West Virginia	599	144.1
8	Tori Watts	Georgia Southern	598	122.7

As a team, West Virginia finished first in aggregate scoring in air rifle. The Mountaineers' mark of 2395 tied the NCAA record for air rifle score. TCU finished second with 2387, while Kentucky finished third with 2383.

Team air rifle results
Place	Team	Aggregate score	Centers
1st place, gold medalist(s)	West Virginia	2395	211
2nd place, silver medalist(s)	TCU	2387	207
3rd place, bronze medalist(s)	Kentucky	2383	197
4	Ole Miss	2382	197
5	Nebraska	2382	190
6	Alaska	2380	190
7	Georgia Southern	2379	202
8	Navy	2376	184

=== Final ===
Following the air rifle results, West Virginia emerged as the tournament's winner, reprising their finish in the 2025 edition with an aggregate score of 4748. The win marked an NCAA-record 21 tournament wins for the Mountaineers, and their eighth under head coach Jon Hammond. TCU finished second with a 4741 score, marking the seventh runner-up finish in the Horned Frogs' history. Ole Miss rounded out the podium in third place, with a score of 4738. The placement tied the Rebels' best-ever finish, having previously placed third in 2021.

Kentucky and Nebraska finished tied with a score of 4736, however the Wildcats won fourth place due to their number of center shots being higher, leaving the Cornhuskers in fifth. Navy finished sixth with a score of 4722, Georgia Southern in seventh with 4717, and Alaska finished eighth with 4714.

Team final results
Place	Team	Smallbore aggregate	Air rifle aggregate	Total aggregate	Centers
1st place, gold medalist(s)	West Virginia	2353	2395	4748	355
2nd place, silver medalist(s)	TCU	2354	2387	4741	354
3rd place, bronze medalist(s)	Ole Miss	2356	2382	4738	339
4	Kentucky	2353	2383	4736	328
5	Nebraska	2354	2382	4736	318
6	Navy	2346	2376	4722	310
7	Georgia Southern	2338	2379	4717	320
8	Alaska	2334	2380	4714	309

In the individual competition, Griffin Lake of West Virginia was named the Most Outstanding Performer of the championship, with an aggregate score of 1194 (595 in smallbore and 599 in air rifle).

Individual shooter final results
Place	Athlete	Team	Smallbore aggregate	Air rifle aggregate	Total aggregate	Centers
1st place, gold medalist(s)	Griffin Lake	West Virginia	595	599	1194	101
2nd place, silver medalist(s)	Audrey Gogniat	Ole Miss	592	600	1192	95
3rd place, bronze medalist(s)	Katie Zaun	TCU	593	598	1191	103
4	Océanne Muller	West Virginia	592	599	1191	92
5	Elizabeth Probst	Kentucky	592	598	1190	89
6	Braden Peiser	Kentucky	596	594	1190	86
7	Tyler Wee	Navy	591	598	1189	83
8	Katlyn Sullivan	Nebraska	589	599	1188	90
9	Mikole Hogan	TCU	590	598	1188	86
10	Gracie Dinh	Ole Miss	593	594	1187	87
11	Lucie Kissenberger	Alaska	588	598	1186	84
12	Emma Rhode	Nebraska	591	595	1186	82
13	Parker Haydin	Navy	590	595	1185	85
14	Bremen Butler	Georgia Southern	588	596	1184	81
15	Maddy Moyer	Nebraska	589	595	1184	79
16	Regan Diamond	Ole Miss	588	594	1182	80
17	Rylie Passmore	TCU	585	596	1181	85
18	Isabella Baldwin	Navy	585	596	1181	81
19	Christina Hillinger	TCU	586	595	1181	79
20	Emme Walrath	Georgia Southern	587	593	1180	85
20	Jennifer Kocher	West Virginia	581	599	1180	85
22	Sofia Ceccarello	Kentucky	583	597	1180	83
23	Marissa Fedora	TCU	585	595	1180	82
24	Noah Meierotto	Alaska	582	597	1179	80
25	Lauri Syrja	West Virginia	585	594	1179	79
26	Tori Watts	Georgia Southern	580	598	1178	75
27	Camryn Camp	West Virginia	580	598	1178	68
28	Jordan de Jesus	Ole Miss	583	594	1177	77
29	Carley Seabrooke	Nebraska	585	592	1177	72
30	Teagan Perkowski	Alaska	583	593	1176	75
31	Sam Adkins	Kentucky	582	594	1176	70
32	Emma Pohlmann	Georgia Southern	583	592	1175	79
33	Alivia Perkins	Nebraska	574	593	1167	66
34	Ryan Wee	Navy	580	587	1167	61
35	Zahra Gonzalez Mazo	Georgia Southern	579	587	1166	53
36	Susan Carter	Ole Miss	580	584	1164	61
37	Tobias Bernhoft-Osa	Alaska	570	592	1162	64
38	Martin Voss	Kentucky	572	586	1158	61
39	Catherine Dely	Navy	563	575	1138	51
–	Kameron Wells	UTEP	–	597	597	51
–	Caroline Martin	Murray State	–	597	597	47
–	Lily Wytko	Air Force	–	595	595	48
–	Lea Soulé	Murray State	589	–	589	39
–	Lily Miller	Air Force	–	588	588	38
–	Carlotta Salafia	Murray State	586	–	586	31
–	Katrina Demerle	Memphis	583	–	583	32
–	Addison Antwiler	Army	582	–	582	31
–	Marshall Schmidt	Alaska	581	–	581	26
