= Ole Miss Rebels rifle =

Rifle team of the University of Mississippi

Ole Miss Rebels
- Founded: 1996; 30 years ago
- University: University of Mississippi
- Athletic director: Keith Carter
- Head coach: Will Shaner (1st season)
- Conference: Patriot Rifle
- Location: Oxford, Mississippi, US
- Arena: Patricia C. Lamar National Guard Readiness Center
- Colors: Cardinal red and navy blue

NCAA Team Third Place
- 2021, 2026

NCAA Individual Runners-up – Smallbore
- 2026

NCAA Individual Third Place – Smallbore
- 2021

NCAA Individual Champions – Air Rifle
- 2025, 2026

NCAA Individual Third Place – Air Rifle
- 2021

NCAA Tournament appearances
- 2006, 2021, 2022, 2023, 2024, 2025, 2026

The Ole Miss Rebels rifle team represents the University of Mississippi in collegiate-level rifle shooting. The team competes in NCAA Division I and is a member of the Patriot Rifle Conference (PRC). Previously, the program was part of the Great America Rifle Conference (GARC) before departing for the PRC in 2024. The team won its first ever individual championship when Audrey Gogniat won the air rifle competition in 2025.

== History ==
The university first announced the formation of an intercollegiate rifle team in April 1996, with the intent to debut the team in the fall of that year. The impetus behind the decision was that the university needed to add another women's team to comply with Title IX stipulations. The Southeastern Conference mandated that each member school have two more women's schools than men's (at the time, Ole Miss had eight men's sports and seven women's). To meet the requirement, Athletic Director Pete Boone added softball, soccer, and rifle, in order to avoid dropping a men's sport. While college rifle is considered a coed school by the NCAA, Ole Miss added it as a woman-only activity.

=== Valerie Boothe era (1996–2016) ===
The team's first head coach was Valerie Boothe, who worked with the University of Tennessee at Martin's ROTC rifle squad. The Rebels' NCAA rifle championships debut occurred in 2006, following a fifth-place finish in the Great America Rifle Conference championship. At the national championship, the Rebels finished sixth with a score of 4616 points, 64 points shy of champions Alaska. Boothe was recognized as the National Coach of the Year by the Collegiate Rifles Coaches Association following the Rebels' championship appearance.

In 2016, following her twentieth season at the helm, Boothe was relieved of her head coaching duties. Athletic director Ross Bjork claimed that "a change was necessary to reach a position of national competitiveness in this unique sport."

=== Marsha Beasley era (2016–23) ===
Following Boothe's departure, the Rebels signed Marsha Beasley, former West Virginia Mountaineers rifle head coach from 1990 to 2006. In 2017–18 season, Beasley led the Rebels to a school-record seven wins and was named the Collegiate Rifle Association's Co-National Coach of the Year. During the 2020–21 season, the Rebels qualified for the national championship for the first time in 15 years, and entered the competition ranked number 2 nationally. The Rebels finished third in the competition, with 4710 points, 21 shy of champions Kentucky. Lea Horvath finishing third in both smallbore and air rifle competitions for a unanimous first-team All-American selection.

Following that third-place finish, Beasley led the Rebels to two more championship appearances. The Rebels finished fourth in 2022, with 4713 points, 26 away from repeat champions Kentucky. In the following year's championship, Ole Miss again finished fourth with 4713 points, this time 16 less than champions Alaska. The team finished second in the team smallbore competition.

Beasley announced her retirement in July 2023.

=== Rachel Martin and Will Shaner era (2023–present) ===
Replacing Beasley was Rachel Martin, former head coach of Nebraska Cornhuskers rifle from 2020 to 2022 before taking the assistant coaching position at Ole Miss the previous season. Under Martin, the Rebels continued the streak of NCAA championship appearances, with a seventh-place finish in 2024 and a fourth-place finish in 2025. Audrey Gogniat, a bronze medalist at the women's 10 metre air rifle event at the 2024 Summer Olympics, won the individual air rifle event, marking the Rebels' first individual rifle champion since the team's foundation. Following the 2024–25 season, Martin resigned as head coach to look for other professional opportunities.

In May 2025, the Rebels announced the promotion of assistant coach and Olympic gold medalist Will Shaner to serve as the head coach for the 2025–26 season. In his first season at the helm, the Rebels finished third as a team at the 2026 NCAA Rifle Championships. Gogniat reprised her individual air rifle championship and finished second in the smallbore competition.

== See also ==
- List of NCAA rifle programs
