= 1988 NCAA Rifle Championships =

1988 NCAA Rifle Championship
Tournament information
- Sport: Collegiate rifle shooting
- Location: (Virginia) Lexington, VA
- Host(s): Virginia Military Institute
- Venue(s): Kilbourne Hall
- Participants: 8

Final positions
- Champions: West Virginia (4th title)
- 1st runners-up: Murray State
- 2nd runners-up: South Florida

Tournament statistics
- Smallbore: Web Wright, WVU
- Air rifle: Deena Wigger, MUR

The 1988 NCAA Rifle Championships were contested at the ninth annual competition to determine the team and individual national champions of NCAA co-ed collegiate rifle shooting in the United States. The championship was held at Kilbourne Hall at the Virginia Military Institute in Lexington, Virginia.

West Virginia, with a team score of 6,192, returned to the top of the team standings, finishing nine points ahead of defending champion Murray State. It was the Mountaineers fourth national title and fourth title in six years.

The individual champions were, for the smallbore rifle, defending titlist Mike Anti (West Virginia), and, for the air rifle, Deena Wigger (Murray State).

== Qualification ==
Since there is only one national collegiate championship for rifle shooting, all NCAA rifle programs (whether from Division I, Division II, or Division III) were eligible. A total of seven teams ultimately contested this championship.

== Results ==
- Scoring: The championship consisted of 120 shots by each competitor in smallbore and 40 shots per competitor in air rifle.

=== Team title ===
Rank	Team	Points
1st place, gold medalist(s)	West Virginia	6,192
2nd place, silver medalist(s)	Murray State	6,183
3rd place, bronze medalist(s)	South Florida	6,152
4	Tennessee Tech	6,140
5	Alaska–Fairbanks	6,135
6	Tennessee–Martin	6,086
7	St. John's (NY)	6,075
8	Navy	6,056

=== Individual events ===
Event	Winner	Score
Smallbore	Web Wright, West Virginia	1,168
Air rifle	Deena Wigger, Murray State	390
