= Peter Durben =

American sport shooter

Personal information
- Nationality: American
- Born: Saint Paul, Minnesota, United States
- Education: University of South Florida

Sport
- Sport: Riflery

Peter Durben is an American sport shooter. He competed in the Men's 50 meter Free Rifle Prone event at the 1992 Summer Olympics in Barcelona. He is also the brother of fellow Olympic rifle shooter Daniel Durben. Durben attended the University of South Florida, where he majored in chemical engineering and competed on the Bulls rifle team, which finished second in the 1989 NCAA Rifle Championship.
