= 2025 NCAA Rifle Championships =

- Season: 2024–25
- Teams: 8
- Format: Points System
- Finals site: Memorial Coliseum; Lexington, Kentucky
- Champions: West Virginia (20th title)
- Runner-up: Kentucky (7th runner-up)
- Winning coach: Jon Hammond (7th title)
- Most Outstanding Performer: Rachael Charles (Alaska Fairbanks)

The 2025 NCAA Rifle Championships was a tournament held to determine the National Collegiate Athletic Association (NCAA) rifle shooting champions for the 2024–25 season. The 45th annual edition of the championship was held on March 14 and 15, 2025, at the Memorial Coliseum on the campus of the University of Kentucky in Lexington, Kentucky, United States.

West Virginia won the national championship, winning its 20th tournament with a 4738-point aggregate score. Kentucky finished second with 4737 points, marking the university's seventh runner-up finish in the NCAA championships. Alaska Fairbanks finished third with 4726 points, marking its second straight third-place finish.

Rachael Charles of Alaska Fairbanks was named the Most Outstanding Performer after finishing first in individual aggregate scoring, with 1,191 points. Cecelia Ossi of Alaska Fairbanks won the individual smallbore competition with a score of 464.7 points in the finals, while Audrey Gogniat of Ole Miss won the individual air rifle competition with a finals score of 251.0 points.

== Bid selection ==
Teams were selected by averaging their three highest regular-season match aggregate scores and adding that value to their aggregate score at their designated NCAA qualifier event. The top eight teams would be selected to compete in the national championship. The NCAA hosted its selection show for rifle on February 24, 2025.

Team qualifiers for the 2025 NCAA rifle championship
Team	Appearance	Last appearance
Air Force	23rd	2024
Alaska Fairbanks	38th	2024
Georgia Southern	1st	Never
Kentucky	30th	2024
Murray State	36th	2023
Ole Miss	6th	2024
TCU	18th	2024
West Virginia	41st	2024

Five shooters each from the eight selected schools competed in the individual smallbore and air rifle events. Eight individuals from non-qualifying schools also qualified for the national championships based on their marks in their NCAA qualifier event. In the smallbore event, Marleigh Duncan of Navy, Emma Rhode of Nebraska, and Erin Schnupp of Akron qualified. In air rifle, Addison Antwiler of Army, Hayden Bell of Morehead State, Gabriella Sprague of Ohio State, and Carlee Valenta of UTEP qualified. Maddy Moyer of Nebraska qualified for both the smallbore and air rifle events.

== Results ==
=== Smallbore ===
Individual smallbore final results
Place	Athlete	Team	Qualifying score	Final score
1st place, gold medalist(s)	Cecelia Ossi	Alaska Fairbanks	593	464.7
2nd place, silver medalist(s)	Rachael Charles	Alaska Fairbanks	595	463.6
3rd place, bronze medalist(s)	Katie Zaun	TCU	589	453.6
4	Braden Peiser	Kentucky	591	442.0
5	Sofia Ceccarello	Kentucky	591	431.5
6	Griffin Lake	West Virginia	591	420.3
7	Elizabeth Probst	Kentucky	589	408.8
8	Natalie Perrin	West Virginia	592	407.2

Team smallbore results
Place	Team	Aggregate score	Centers
1st place, gold medalist(s)	Alaska Fairbanks	2355	147
2nd place, silver medalist(s)	Kentucky	2354	135
3rd place, bronze medalist(s)	West Virginia	2350	145
4	TCU	2335	126
5	Ole Miss	2333	124
6	Georgia Southern	2333	113
7	Murray State	2322	111
8	Air Force	2321	117

=== Air rifle ===
Individual air rifle final results
Place	Athlete	Team	Qualifying score	Final score
1st place, gold medalist(s)	Audrey Gogniat	Ole Miss	600	251.0 (10.6)*
2nd place, silver medalist(s)	Braden Peiser	Kentucky	599	251.0 (9.8)*
3rd place, bronze medalist(s)	Ashlyn Blake	West Virginia	597	228.9
4	Carlotta Salafia	Murray State	598	207.2
5	Natalie Perrin	West Virginia	598	185.7
6	Katie Zaun	TCU	599	164.9
7	Victoria Leppert	Air Force	598	143.8
8	Lauren Hurley	Air Force	597	120.9

*Score from shoot-off

Team air rifle results
Place	Team	Aggregate score	Centers
1st place, gold medalist(s)	West Virginia	2388	210
2nd place, silver medalist(s)	Ole Miss	2383	207
3rd place, bronze medalist(s)	Kentucky	2383	198
4	Air Force	2382	198
5	Georgia Southern	2380	189
6	TCU	2377	183
7	Alaska Fairbanks	2371	191
8	Murray State	2371	187

=== Final ===
Following the air rifle results, West Virginia emerged as the tournament's winner, securing their first championship since 2017 aggregate score of 4738. The win marked 20 tournament wins for the Mountaineers, with this being their seventh title under head coach Jon Hammond. Kentucky finished second with a 4737 score, marking the seventh runner-up finish in the Wildcats' history. Alaska Fairbanks rounded out the podium in third place, with a score of 4726.

Ole Miss finished fourth with a score of 4716, and Georgia Southern finished in fifth with a score of 4713. TCU finished in sixth with a score of 4712. Air Force finished in seventh with 4703, and Murray State finished eighth with 4693.

Team final results
Place	Team	Smallbore aggregate	Air rifle aggregate	Total aggregate	Centers
1st place, gold medalist(s)	West Virginia	2350	2388	4738	355
2nd place, silver medalist(s)	Kentucky	2354	2383	4737	333
3rd place, bronze medalist(s)	Alaska Fairbanks	2355	2371	4726	338
4	Ole Miss	2333	2383	4716	331
5	Georgia Southern	2333	2380	4713	302
6	TCU	2335	2377	4712	309
7	Air Force	2321	2382	4703	315
8	Murray State	2322	2371	4693	298

In the individual competition, Rachael Charles of Alaska Fairbanks was named the Most Outstanding Performer of the championship, with an aggregate score of 1191 (595 in smallbore and 596 in air rifle).

Individual shooter final results
Place	Athlete	Team	Smallbore aggregate	Air rifle aggregate	Total aggregate	Centers
1st place, gold medalist(s)	Rachael Charles	Alaska Fairbanks	595	596	1191	101
2nd place, silver medalist(s)	Braden Peiser	Kentucky	591	599	1190	93
3rd place, bronze medalist(s)	Natalie Perrin	West Virginia	592	598	1190	90
4	Griffin Lake	West Virginia	591	597	1188	94
5	Katie Zaun	TCU	589	599	1188	91
6	Sofia Ceccarello	Kentucky	591	597	1188	83
7	Audrey Gogniat	Ole Miss	587	600	1187	93
8	Gracie Dinh	Ole Miss	588	597	1185	85
9	Elizabeth Probst	Kentucky	589	595	1184	85
10	Cecelia Ossi	Alaska Fairbanks	593	591	1184	83
11	Victoria Leppert	Air Force	582	598	1180	79
12	Emme Walrath	Georgia Southern	586	594	1180	75
12	Tori Watts	Georgia Southern	586	594	1180	75
14	Carlotta Salafia	Murray State	581	598	1179	87
15	Ashlyn Blake	West Virginia	582	597	1179	82
16	Mikole Hogan	TCU	585	594	1179	73
17	Lily Wytko	Air Force	582	596	1178	88
18	Gavin Barnick	West Virginia	585	592	1177	81
19	Emma Pohlmann	Georgia Southern	581	596	1177	77
20	Lauren Hurley	Air Force	579	597	1176	83
21	Bremen Butler	Georgia Southern	580	596	1176	75
22	Lauri Syrja	West Virginia	579	596	1175	80
23	Rylie Passmore	TCU	581	594	1175	78
24	Sam Adkins	Kentucky	583	592	1175	72
25	Amanda Pettersen	Alaska Fairbanks	581	593	1174	75
26	Scott Patterson	Murray State	580	594	1174	67
27	Lucie Kissenberger	Alaska Fairbanks	582	591	1173	78
28	Lea Horvath	Ole Miss	580	592	1172	78
29	Micah Hames	TCU	580	590	1170	75
30	Jordan De Jesus	Ole Miss	578	592	1170	71
31	John Blanton	Murray State	580	590	1170	67
32	M'Leah Lambdin	Ole Miss	575	594	1169	74
33	Maddy Moyer	Nebraska	576	593	1169	73
34	Zach Jackson	Murray State	581	587	1168	66
35	Scott Rockett	Air Force	576	591	1167	69
36	Allison Henry	Murray State	575	589	1164	71
37	Martin Voss	Kentucky	575	588	1163	67
38	Christina Hillinger	TCU	573	589	1162	70
39	Ella Goldfaden	Georgia Southern	573	588	1161	65
40	William Steen	Air Force	578	581	1159	69
–	Carlee Valenta	UTEP	–	595	595	51
–	Gabriella Sprague	Ohio State	–	595	595	47
–	Addison Antwiler	Army	–	594	594	44
–	Hayden Bell	Morehead State	–	591	591	45
–	Emma Rhode	Nebraska	586	–	586	36
–	Sara Karasova	Alaska Fairbanks	585	–	585	33
–	Erin Schnupp	Akron	582	–	582	34
–	Marleigh Duncan	Navy	579	–	579	25
