= 2015 NCAA Rifle Championships =

2015 NCAA Rifle Championship

Tournament information
- Sport: Collegiate rifle shooting
- Location: (Alaska) Fairbanks, AK
- Host(s): University of Alaska Fairbanks
- Venue(s): E.F. Horton Rifle Range
- Participants: 8 teams

Final positions
- Champions: West Virginia (17th title)
- 1st runners-up: Alaska
- 2nd runners-up: TCU

Tournament statistics
- Smallbore champion: Rachel Martin, Nebraska
- Air rifle champion: Maren Prediger, West Virginia

The 2015 NCAA Rifle Championships were contested at the 36th annual NCAA-sanctioned competition to determine the team and individual national champions of co-ed collegiate rifle shooting in the United States.

The championships were held at the E.F. Horton Rifle Range at the University of Alaska Fairbanks in Fairbanks, Alaska.

Two-time defending champions West Virginia again won the team championship, the Mountaineers' seventeenth NCAA national title in rifle.

== Qualification ==
With only one national collegiate championship for rifle shooting, all NCAA rifle programs (whether from Division I, Division II, or Division III) were eligible. A total of eight teams contested this championship.

== Results ==
- Scoring: The championship consisted of 60 shots for both smallbore and air rifle per team.

=== Team title ===
- (DC) = Defending champions
- Italics = Inaugural championship
- † = Team won center shot tiebreaker

| Rank | Team | Points |
|---|---|---|
| 1st place, gold medalist(s) | West Virginia (DC) | 4,702 |
| 2nd place, silver medalist(s) | Alaska | 4,700 |
| 3rd place, bronze medalist(s) | TCU | 4,667† |
| 4 | Nebraska | 4,667 |
| 5 | Jacksonville State | 4,664 |
| 6 | Kentucky | 4,657 |
| 7 | Air Force | 4,642 |
| 8 | Murray State | 4,637 |

=== Individual events ===
| Event | Winner | Score |
|---|---|---|
| Smallbore | Rachel Martin, Nebraska | 453.3 |
| Air rifle | Maren Prediger, West Virginia | 205.8 |
