= 1989 NCAA Rifle Championships =

1989 NCAA Rifle Championship
Tournament information
- Sport: Collegiate rifle shooting
- Location: (Kentucky) Murray, KY
- Host(s): Murray State University
- Participants: 7

Final positions
- Champions: West Virginia (5th title)
- 1st runners-up: South Florida
- 2nd runners-up: Tennessee Tech

Tournament statistics
- Smallbore: Deb Sinclair, UAF
- Air rifle: Michelle Scarborough, USF

The 1989 NCAA Rifle Championships were contested at the ninth annual competition to determine the team and individual national champions of NCAA co-ed collegiate rifle shooting in the United States. The championship was held at (what is now known as) the Pat Spurgin Rifle Range at Murray State University in Murray, Kentucky.

West Virginia, with a team score of 6,234, retained the team championship, finishing 54 points ahead of South Florida. It was the Mountaineers second consecutive and fifth overall national title.

The individual champions were, for the smallbore rifle, defending titlist Deb Sinclair (Alaska–Fairbanks), and, for the air rifle, Michelle Scarborough (South Florida).

== Qualification ==
Since there is only one national collegiate championship for rifle shooting, all NCAA rifle programs (whether from Division I, Division II, or Division III) were eligible. A total of seven teams ultimately contested this championship.

== Results ==
- Scoring: The championship consisted of 120 shots by each competitor in smallbore and 40 shots per competitor in air rifle.

=== Team title ===
Rank	Team	Points
1st place, gold medalist(s)	West Virginia	6,234
2nd place, silver medalist(s)	South Florida	6,180
3rd place, bronze medalist(s)	Tennessee Tech	6,167
4	Air Force	6,110
5	Murray State	6,102
6	Alaska–Fairbanks	6,069
7	UTEP	6,039

=== Individual events ===
Event	Winner	Score
Smallbore	Deb Sinclair, Alaska	1,171
Air rifle	Michelle Scarborough, South Florida	399
