= Griffin Lake =

American sport shooter (born 2005)

- Born: May 4, 2005 (age 21); Emmaus, Pennsylvania
- Occupation: Sport shooting
- Years active: 2021 - present

Griffin Lake is an American sport shooter who competes in rifle shooting events for West Virginia University and for the United States national team. He was the West Virginia Mountaineers' individual champion and Most Outstanding Performer at the 2026 NCAA Rifle Championships, and he has won multiple medals at ISSF junior international competitions, including gold at the 2026 ISSF Junior World Championships.

== Early life ==
Lake was born on May 4, 2005, and is from Emmaus, Pennsylvania. He began shooting recreationally with his family at around age five and started competing at age eleven, joining the Ontelaunee Rod & Gun Club Junior Rifle Team in New Tripoli, Pennsylvania. He also shot for his high school team, Emmaus High School. As a junior competitor, Lake set U.S. national records in the 3-position smallbore event and won titles at Civilian Marksmanship Program national and regional championships in 2022. He competed for the United States at the 2022 ISSF Junior World Championships in Cairo, where he won a bronze medal in the junior men's 50m rifle three-position event. He signed a national letter of intent to shoot at West Virginia University in 2022.

== Career ==
=== College career ===
Lake shoots for the West Virginia Mountaineers rifle team under head coach Jon Hammond. He was part of West Virginia's national championship teams in 2025 and 2026, the program's 20th and 21st NCAA titles.

At the 2026 NCAA Rifle Championships, held March 13–14, 2026, at the Covelli Center in Columbus, Ohio, Lake won the individual aggregate title with a score of 1,194 points (101 X-count), finished runner-up in both the smallbore (595) and air rifle (599) individual competitions, and was named the tournament's Most Outstanding Performer, becoming the fifth West Virginia shooter to receive the honor. West Virginia's air rifle team score of 2,395 tied the NCAA record, and the team's aggregate of 4,748 secured the program's 21st national championship.

=== International career ===
Competing for USA Shooting, Lake reached the smallbore final at the 2024 ISSF Junior World Championships, finishing sixth individually and helping the U.S. team place seventh.

At the 2025 ISSF Junior World Cup in Suhl, Germany, Lake won a bronze medal in the men's 50m rifle prone event, the first medal of the event for the U.S. team, and went on to reach finals in the 50m three-position and air rifle events as well as the mixed team air rifle event.

Lake was also a member of the 2025 U.S. Junior Pan American Games team in Asunción, winning silver in the men's 10m air rifle and bronze in the mixed team air rifle event, and won multiple titles at the 2025 USA Shooting Junior Olympic Championships in the men's air rifle and 3-position smallbore events.

At the 2026 ISSF Junior World Championships, Lake won gold medals in the junior men's 50m rifle prone event and the 50m rifle three-position team event, along with a silver in the 10m air rifle team event and a bronze in the 50m rifle prone team event.
