= 1987 NCAA rifle championships =

Eighth annual collegiate shooting tournament

1987 NCAA Rifle Championship
Tournament information
- Sport: Collegiate rifle shooting
- Location: (Ohio) Cincinnati, OH
- Host(s): Xavier University
- Venue(s): Xavier University Rifle Range
- Participants: 6

Final positions
- Champions: Murray State (2nd title)
- 1st runners-up: West Virginia
- 2nd runners-up: South Florida

Tournament statistics
- Smallbore: Web Wright, WVU
- Air rifle: Rob Harbison, UTM

The 1987 NCAA Rifle Championships were contested at the eighth annual competition to determine the team and individual national champions of NCAA co-ed collegiate rifle shooting in the United States. The championship was held at the Xavier University Rifle Range at Xavier University in Cincinnati, Ohio.

Murray State, with a team score of 6,205, bested defending champions West Virginia in the team standings by 2 points to claim their second national title. It was the Racers' second title in three seasons.

The individual champions were, for the smallbore rifle, Web Wright (West Virginia), and, for the air rifle, Rob Harbison (Tennessee–Martin).

== Qualification ==
Since there is only one national collegiate championship for rifle shooting, all NCAA rifle programs (whether from Division I, Division II, or Division III) were eligible. A total of seven teams ultimately contested this championship.

== Results ==
- Scoring: The championship consisted of 120 shots by each competitor in smallbore and 40 shots per competitor in air rifle.

=== Team title ===
Rank	Team	Points
1st place, gold medalist(s)	Murray State	6,205
2nd place, silver medalist(s)	West Virginia	6,203
3rd place, bronze medalist(s)	South Florida	6,175
4	Tennessee Tech	6,113
5	Navy	6,107
6	Army	6,094

=== Individual events ===
Event	Winner	Score
Smallbore	Web Wright, West Virginia	1,174
Air rifle	Rob Harbison, Tennessee–Martin	392
