= NC State Wolfpack =

Intercollegiate sports teams of North Carolina State University

- University: North Carolina State University
- Nickname: Wolfpack
- NCAA: Division I (FBS)
- Conference: Atlantic Coast Conference
- Athletic director: Boo Corrigan
- Location: Raleigh, North Carolina
- Varsity teams: 22
- Football stadium: Carter–Finley Stadium
- Basketball arena: Lenovo Center (men); Reynolds Coliseum (women)
- Baseball stadium: Doak Field
- Softball stadium: Curtis & Jacqueline Dail Softball Stadium
- Soccer stadium: Dail Soccer Field
- Aquatics center: Willis R. Casey Aquatics Center
- Other venues: Paul Derr Track & Field Facility; J. W. Isenhour Tennis Center; Lonnie Poole Golf Course
- Colors: Red and white
- Mascot: Mr. Wuf & Ms. Wuf
- Website: gopack.com
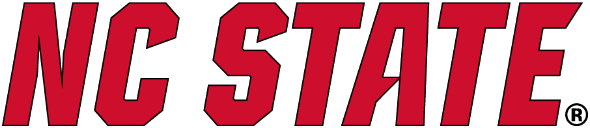

Atlantic Coast Conference logo in NC State's colors

The NC State Wolfpack is the nickname of the athletic teams representing North Carolina State University. The Wolfpack competes at the National Collegiate Athletic Association (NCAA) Division I (Football Bowl Subdivision (FBS) for college football) as a member of the Atlantic Coast Conference (ACC) for all sports since the 1953–54 season. The athletic teams of the Wolfpack compete in 22 intercollegiate varsity sports. NC State is a founding member of the ACC and has won twelve national championships: six NCAA championships, two AIAW championships, and four titles under other sanctioning bodies. Most NC State fans and athletes recognize the rivalry with the North Carolina Tar Heels as their biggest.

The logo for NC State athletics is a wolf head wearing a sailor cap. The wolf depicted is known by NC State fans as "Tuffy" (not to be confused with the on-site mascots, Mr. and Ms. Wuf). The wolf head logo was preceded by the block S logo, which consisted of an 'N' and a 'C' inscribed in a larger 'S'.

NC State athletic teams are nicknamed the 'Wolfpack'. The name was unofficially adopted by the football program in 1921 following an unsigned letter to the NC State Alumni News suggesting the moniker "Wolf Pack". Other varsity teams of that era were called the "Red Terrors" until 1948, when a campus-wide vote chose "Wolfpack" as the nickname for all varsity teams. Prior to the adoption of the current nickname, North Carolina State athletic teams went by such names as the Aggies, the Techs, the Red Terrors, and Farmers.

== Sports sponsored ==
| Men's Sports | Women's Sports |
|---|---|
| Baseball | Basketball |
| Basketball | Cross Country |
| Cross Country | Golf |
| Football | Gymnastics |
| Golf | Soccer |
| Soccer | Softball |
| Swimming & Diving | Swimming & Diving |
| Tennis | Tennis |
| Track and Field^{†} | Track and Field^{†} |
| Wrestling | Volleyball |
† – Track and Field includes both indoor and outdoor.

=== Baseball ===
- Head Coach: Elliott Avent
- Stadium: Doak Field
- ACC Championships: 5 (1968, 1973, 1974, 1975, 1992)
- CWS appearances: 4 (1968, 2013, 2021, 2024)

=== Men's basketball ===
- Head Coach: Justin Gainey
- Arena: Lenovo Center
- National Championships: 2 (1974, 1983)
- Southern Conference Championships: 7 (1929, 1947, 1948, 1949, 1950, 1951, 1952)
- ACC Championships: 11 (1954, 1955, 1956, 1959, 1965, 1970, 1973, 1974, 1983, 1987, 2024)

The above record of conference titles does not include regular season 1st place finishes as championships – the ACC recognizes only the winner of the ACC Tournament as its champion.

=== Women's basketball ===
- Head Coach: Wes Moore
- Arena: Reynolds Coliseum
- ACC Championships (regular season): 6 (1978, 1980, 1983, 1985, 1990, 2022)
- ACC Championships (ACC Tournament): 7 (1980, 1985, 1987, 1991, 2020, 2021, 2022)

=== Cross country ===
==== Men's cross country ====
- Head Coach: Laurie Henes
- NCAA Southeast Region Championships: 9 (2001, 2002, 2003, 2004, 2006, 2007, 2011, 2016, 2018)
- ACC Championships: 16 (1953, 1986, 1991, 1992, 1995, 1996, 1997, 1998, 1999, 2001, 2002, 2003, 2004, 2006, 2009, 2011)

==== Women's cross country ====
- Head Coach: Laurie Henes
- National Championships (Team): 6 (1979†, 1980†, 2021, 2022, 2023, 2025)
- National Champions (Individual): 6 (1979†, 1980†, 1981, 1983, 1985, 2022)
  - (1979) Julie Shea
  - (1980) Julie Shea
  - (1981) Betty Springs
  - (1983) Betty Springs
  - (1985) Suzie Tuffey
  - (2022) Katelyn Tuohy
- NCAA Southeast Region Championships: 14 (2000, 2001, 2006, 2007, 2016, 2017, 2018, 2019, 2021, 2022, 2023, 2024, 2025, 2026)
- ACC Championships: 31 (1978, 1979, 1980, 1983, 1984, 1985, 1987, 1988, 1989, 1990, 1991, 1992, 1993, 1995, 1996, 1997, 1998, 2000, 2001, 2002, 2006, 2016, 2017, 2018, 2019, 2020, 2021, 2022, 2023, 2025, 2026)

The women's cross country team has competed in more NCAA championships than any other school in the nation (25). Additionally the Wolfpack women's cross country team has won more ACC cross country championships (31) than all other schools combined and are the most by an ACC women's program in any sport.

†AIAW Women's National Championships

=== Football ===
- Head Coach: Dave Doeren
- Stadium: Carter–Finley Stadium
- ACC Championships: 7 (1957, 1963, 1964, 1965, 1968, 1973, 1979)
- Southern Conference Championships: 1 (1927)
- South Atlantic Intercollegiate Championships: 3 (1907, 1910, 1913)
- Bowl games: 37 (18-18-1)

=== Golf ===
- Head Coach: Press McPhaul and Darby Sligh
- Course: Lonnie Poole Golf Course
- National Championships (Men's individual): 1 (2009 Matt Hill)
- ACC Championships (Men's): 1 (1990)

=== Gymnastics ===
- Head Coach: Kim Landrus
- Stadium: Reynolds Coliseum
- ACC Championships: 2 (1984, 2024)
- EAGL Championships: 6 (1999, 2000, 2007, 2009, 2013, 2018)

=== Men's soccer ===
- Head Coach: Marc Hubbard
- Stadium: Dail Soccer Field
- NCAA Tournament Appearances: 18 (1981, 1983, 1984, 1985, 1986, 1987, 1990, 1991, 1992, 1994, 2003, 2005, 2009, 2017, 2018, 2019, 2024, 2025)
- ACC Regular Season Championships: 1 (1994)
- ACC Tournament Championships: 1 (1990)

=== Women's soccer ===
- Head Coach: Tim Santoro
- Stadium: Dail Soccer Field
- NCAA Tournament Appearances: 16 (1985, 1986, 1987, 1988, 1989, 1990, 1991, 1992, 1994, 1995, 1996, 2016, 2017, 2018, 2019, 2021)
- NCAA Tournament Finalist: 1 (1988)
- ACC Regular Season Championships: 1 (1988)
- ACC Tournament Championships: 1 (1988)

=== Softball ===
- Head Coach: Lindsay Leftwich
- Stadium: Curtis & Jacqueline Dail Softball Stadium
- ACC Championships: 2 (2006, 2013)

=== Swimming and diving ===
- Head Coach: Braden Holloway
- Stadium: Willis R. Casey Aquatics Center
- National Champions (Individual): 26
- ACC Championships (Men's): 33 (1954, 1955, 1956, 1961, 1963, 1966, 1967, 1968, 1969, 1971, 1972, 1973, 1974, 1975, 1976, 1977, 1978, 1979, 1980, 1981, 1982, 1984, 1985, 1992, 2015, 2016, 2017, 2018, 2019, 2020, 2022, 2023, 2024)
- ACC Championships (Women's): 4 (1979,1980, 2017, 2019)

=== Men's tennis ===
- Head Coach: Kyle Spencer
- Stadium: J. W. Isenhour Tennis Center
- ACC Team Championships: 2 (1978, 1979)
- ACC Singles Champions: 4 (1978, 1979, 1997, 1998)
- ACC Doubles Champions: 5 (1976, 1978, 1980, 1981, 1992)
- notable former players: John Sadri, Roberto Bracone

=== Women's tennis ===
- Head Coach: Simon Earnshaw
- Stadium: J. W. Isenhour Tennis Center
- National Champions: 2
  - Doubles - 2022– Jaeda Daniel/Nell Miller
  - Doubles - 2025 - Gabbi Broadfoot/Tori Osuigwe
- ACC Team Championships: 2 (2023, 2026)

=== Track and field ===
- Head Coach: Rollie Geiger and Laurie Henes
- Stadium: Paul Derr Track & Field Facility
- National Champions (Men's Individual - outdoor): 2
- National Champions (Women's Individual - indoor): 2
- National Champions (Women's Individual - outdoor): 11
- ACC Championships (Men's): (Indoor - 1988)(Outdoor - 1983, 1984, 1985, 1986, 1987, 1988, 1996)

=== Volleyball ===
- Head Coach: Megan Wargo-Kearney
- Stadium: Reynolds Coliseum
- ACC Tournament Champions: 1 (1987)

=== Wrestling ===
- Head Coach: Pat Popolizio
- Stadium: Reynolds Coliseum
- NCAA National Champions (Individual): 10
- NCAA All-Americans: 59
- ACC Championships: 21 (1976, 1978, 1981, 1982, 1983, 1988, 1989, 1990, 1991, 1996, 2001, 2002, 2004, 2007, 2016, 2019, 2020, 2021, 2022, 2023, 2024)

North Carolina State University's wrestling team was established in 1925 and goes by the team nickname of the "Wolfpack". Pat Popolizio was named head wrestling coach for the Wolfpack on April 10, 2012. Popolizio was a three-time NCAA qualifier at Oklahoma State University. The wrestling team competes their home matches in the Reynolds Coliseum.

In 2012, Popolizio left his previous program, Binghamton University, with All-American heavyweight Nick Gwiazdowski leaving with him. After redshirting for a year (to avoid losing a year of eligibility per NCAA transfer rules), Gwiazdowski won national titles in 2014 and 2015, becoming the first Wolfpack wrestler to win multiple titles.

During the 2016 season, North Carolina State went as high as number two in the national rankings and had the school record for most wins in a single season. The Wolfpack finished tied for fourth at the 2018 NCAA Tournament, the programs highest finish at the national championships.

- 10 Individual NCAA Championships:
  - (1980) Matt Reiss 167 lbs
  - (1984) Tab Thacker Heavyweight
  - (1988) Scott Turner 150 lbs
  - (1993) Sylvester Terkay Heavyweight
  - (2009) Darrion Caldwell 149 lbs
  - (2014, 2015) Nick Gwiazdowski Heavyweight
  - (2018) Michael Macchiavello 197 lbs
  - (2025) Vincent Robinson 125 lbs
  - (2026) Isaac Trumble Heavyweight

=== Cheerleading ===
NC State also competes in one coed varsity sport.

- Head Coach: Jennifer Marks
- UCA National Titles: Championships: (3) 1986, 1990, 1991
- NCA National Titles: Championships: (5) 2001, 2016, 2018 (Small Coed), 2018 (Gameday), 2023
- UCA National Titles: Group Stunt (3) 2016, 2020, 2024

Cheerleading: NC State fields a full varsity cheerleading team, which is currently coached by head coach Jennifer Marks. The team has achieved impressive success, winning 3 national championships from the Universal Cheerleading Association, 4 national championships from the National Cheerleading Association, and 3 national championships in the Group Stunt competition from the Universal Cheerleading Association.

=== Rifle ===
NC State sponsored a rifle team from 1958 to 2023. In recent decades, this was a coed team, as were most NCAA rifle programs; rifle is the only NCAA sport in which men and women compete alongside and against one another as equals. The Wolfpack won 10 team titles in the South East Air Rifle Conference, a conference specifically for the air rifle discipline, and had also been a member of the Great America Rifle Conference. Rifle was dropped at the end of the 2022–23 season.

== Non-varsity sports ==
North Carolina State University offers numerous non-varsity and club level sports throughout the year. This includes, but is not limited to; baseball, basketball, cheerleading, crew, hockey, lacrosse, rugby, sailing, soccer, swimming, ultimate frisbee and many others.

The North Carolina State University Men's Rugby Football Club was founded in 1965. NC State plays college rugby in the Atlantic Coast Rugby League against its traditional ACC rivals. The NC State rugby team is led by head coach Jim Latham. The Wolfpack plays their home games at the Upper Method Road Field. NC State won the Atlantic Coast Invitational 7s tournament in 2010 and 2011. The Wolfpack finished 13th at the 2011 USA Rugby Sevens Collegiate National Championships. NC State finished 12th at the 2012 Collegiate Rugby Championship, a tournament broadcast live on NBC from PPL Park in Philadelphia. NC State scored a notable upset against #7 ranked Davenport to reach the finals of the 2012 ACI 7s tournament in Blacksburg, only to lose in the final to host Virginia Tech. In 2018, the Wolfpack won the USA Rugby Division II National Championship over Wisconsin-Whitewater and would add the USA Rugby College Sevens National Championship in 2019.

As the university's oldest active sports club, the NC State Sailing Club was founded in 1954, and since 1973 has fielded a competitive intercollegiate co-ed fleet racing team. The program added a women's sailing team in 2013, and an offshore yacht-racing program in 2016. With their home facility at Lake Crabtree County Park, the "SailPack," as the club is known, competes in the South Atlantic Intercollegiate Sailing Association, a division of the Intercollegiate Sailing Association (ICSA). NC State is a Division 1/Cross-Regional classified team within the ICSA competing on par with varsity programs. The SailPack has qualified for SAISA conference championship regattas in coed fleet racing consecutively since the fall of 2012. NC State won the SAISA Conference Coed Fleet Racing title in 2021-2022, and 2022-2023 seasons. As of spring 2024, NC State Sailing is ranked 32nd nationally in coed fleet racing, while the program is ranked 16th nationally in women's fleet racing. NC State has qualified for ICSA College Sailing National Coed Fleet Racing Championships each year from 2021 through 2024, four years consecutively; while the women's program has qualified for the ICSA College Sailing Women's Fleet Racing National Championships for three years consecutively beginning in 2022. As of 2024 NC State is the highest ranking active program in North Carolina ahead of Duke, UNC-Chapel Hill, UNC-Wilmington, Wake Forest, UNC-Charlotte, ECU, and Davidson. Lake Crabtree is also the home venue for NC State's annual Triangle Tango Regatta which features college sailing teams from each active program in North Carolina and other regional states. Additional dinghy and offshore coastal training activities for the SailPack are located in Oriental, North Carolina where NC State Sailing hosts a major intercollegiate regatta each spring known as the SailPack Oriental Intercollegiate Regatta. The 2018 edition of this event was the largest-ever one-design, collegiate regatta ever held in North Carolina. NC State Sailing, together with the SailPack Foundation, host community sailing during the summer and teach sailing and racing skills to the public free of charge.

NC State's ski team is a member of the United States Collegiate Ski and Snowboard Association (USCSA) and competes in races regularly during the winter season.

NC State ultimate frisbee was established in 1978 and currently participates in the USA Ultimate D-1 men's league. The men's team has had 8 national tournament appearances and won the national championships in 1999.

The NC State men's and women's club hockey teams (nicknamed the Icepack) participate in the ACCHL. The Icepack were founded in 1976 and have been coached by Timothy Healy since 2019, and he has been assisted by Alex Rossetto, Nagib Ward, and Alex Fong. The team calls the Invisalign Arena in Morrisville home. Each year, the Wolfpack hosts the Stephen Russell Memorial Tournament to kick off the season in memory of a goaltender for the team from 2006 to 2009. The annual Governor's Cup rivalry game against UNC is also a highlight of the year, played at Lenovo Center before the Thanksgiving holiday break. In 2018–19, NC State finished with an undefeated regular season capped off with an ACCHL title, regional championship and a Nationals appearance. The men's team has won the ACCHL tournament 4 times (2001, 2019, 2020, 2021). The women's team was established in 2019 and has won the ACCHL tournament 1 time (2021).

NC State also boasts a growing men's lacrosse team, formerly an NCAA Division I program from 1973 to 1982. Under head coach Chris Demarest, the Wolfpack went 11–3 in 2017 and advanced to the SELC Tournament in Johns Creek, Georgia before falling to the Georgia Tech Yellow Jackets, who advanced to the semi-final round of the MCLA D1 national championship.

NC State college bass fishing team won the 2006 and 2012 Collegiate bass fishing series.

NC State club sports and intramural championships are covered by PackTV, a division of the Office of Information Technology at the university. PackTV is a student-driven sport channel that is on channel 32.2 on campus as well as streamed online through Apple TV and Roku. Along with intramural championships, club soccer, hockey, lacrosse, and basketball among others, PackTV has also covered varsity-level men's and women's soccer, softball and swimming.

== Championships ==
=== NCAA team championships ===
North Carolina State has won 6 NCAA team national championships.

- Men's (2)
  - Basketball (2): 1974, 1983
- Women's (4)
  - Cross Country (4): 2021, 2022, 2023, 2025

=== Other national team championships ===
- Women's (2)
  - Cross Country (2): 1979*, 1980*

* Prior to 1982, the AIAW administered championships in women's cross country. The NCAA held its first women's cross country championship in 1981.

- Co-Ed (8)
  - Cheerleading (3): 1986, 1990, 1991, 2001, 2016, 2018, 2018, 2023
- see also:
  - ACC NCAA team championships
  - List of NCAA schools with the most NCAA Division I championships

=== NCAA individual championships ===
NC State athletes have won 45 NCAA and 7 AIAW individual championships as of November 18, 2022

== Notable alumni ==
- Nazmi Albadawi, men's soccer (2010–13)
- Chuck Amato, football and wrestling (1965–69)
- Debbie Antonelli, women's basketball (1982–86)
- Andy Barkett, baseball (1992–95)
- Brian Bark, baseball (1987–90)
- Aaron Bates, baseball (2005–06)
- Joan Benoit, cross country (1977–79)
- Simonas Bilis, swimming (2012–16)
- Andrew Brackman, baseball and men's basketball (2005–08)
- Greg Briley, baseball (1986)
- Jacoby Brissett, football (2014-15)
- Andre Brown, football (2004–08)
- Chucky Brown, basketball (1985–89)
- Jimmy Brown, baseball (1932)
- Ted Brown, football (1975–78)
- Willie Burden, football (1971–73)
- Tommy Burleson, men's basketball (1972–74)
- Dick Burrus, baseball (1919)
- Darrion Caldwell, wrestling (2006–2011)
- Mike Caldwell, baseball (1968–71)
- Kenny Carr, men's basketball (1975–77)
- Lorenzo Charles, men's basketball (1982–85)
- Cravont Charleston, track and field (2016–21)
- Bradley Chubb, football (2014–17)
- Tim Clark, men's golf (1996–97)
- Chris Colmer, football (2002–05)
- Chris Corchiani, men's basketball (1988–91)
- Jerricho Cotchery, football (2000–04)
- Bill Cowher, football (1977–79)
- Gabbi Cunningham, Track and field (2015-19)
- Doug Davis, baseball (1982–84)
- Joe DeBerry, baseball (1917–20)
- Vinny Del Negro, men's basketball (1983–87)
- Joey Devine, baseball (2003–05)
- Bill Evans, baseball (1915)
- Adam Everett, baseball (1996)
- Brian Frasure, track and field (1992–96)
- Stu Flythe, baseball (1934–36)
- Tatyana Forbes, Softball (2020-21)
- David Fox, men's swimming & diving (1990–94)
- Terry Gannon, men's basketball (1981-85)
- Roman Gabriel, football (1960–62)
- Mike Glennon, football (2008–12)
- Tom Gugliotta, men's basketball (1989–92)
- Nick Gwiazdowski, wrestling (2012–16)
- Maggie Haney, gymnastics (1997–2000)
- Jeff Hartsock, baseball (1986–88)
- J.J. Hickson, men's basketball (2007–08)
- Trent Hidlay, wrestling (2018–24)
- Nyheim Hines, football (2015–2017), track and field (2015–16)
- Julius Hodge, men's basketball (2001–05)
- Dutch Holland, baseball (1923–25)
- Torry Holt, football (1995–98)
- Charmaine Hooper, women's soccer (1987–90)
- Cullen Jones, men's swimming & diving (2002–06)
- Erik Kramer, football (1985–87)
- Trudi Lacey, women's basketball(1977–81)
- Johnny Lanning, baseball (1931–32)
- Manny Lawson, football (2002–05)
- Sidney Lowe, men's basketball (1980–83)
- Michael Macchiavello, wrestling (2013–18)
- Matt Mangini, baseball (2005–06)
- Pablo Mastroeni, men's soccer (1995–98)
- Joe McIntosh, football (1981–84)
- Nate McMillan, men's basketball (1985–86)
- Jim McNamara, baseball (1984–86)
- Louie Meadows, baseball (1980–82)
- Jakobi Meyers, football (2016-18)
- Rodney Monroe, men's basketball (1988–91)
- George Murray, baseball (1918–21)
- Jessica O'Rourke, women's soccer (2004–07)
- Chad Orvella, baseball (2002–03)
- Chink Outen, baseball (1927–28)
- Jeff Pierce, baseball (1990–91)
- Dan Plesac, baseball (1981–83)
- Mike Quick, football (1978–81)
- Tab Ramos, men's soccer (1984–87)
- Buck Redfern, baseball (1921–24)
- Jim Ritcher, football (1976–79)
- Philip Rivers, football (2000–04)
- Dave Robertson, baseball (1910–12)
- Koren Robinson, football (1999–2001)
- Carlos Rodon, baseball (2012–14)
- John Sadri, men's tennis (1976–78)
- Ronnie Shavlik, men's basketball (1954–56)
- Dennis Smith Jr., men's basketball (2016–17)
- Tommy Smith, baseball (1972–74)
- Thori Staples, women's soccer (1992–95)
- Andrea Stinson, women's basketball (1987–91)
- Tim Stoddard, baseball (1972–75), basketball (1973–1975)
- Doug Strange, baseball (1983–85)
- Eric Surkamp, baseball (2006)
- Craig Sutherland, men's soccer (2010–11)
- Sylvester Terkay, wrestling (1991–93)
- Tab Thacker, wrestling (1980–84)
- David Thompson, men's basketball (1973–75)
- Joe Thuney, football (2011–16)
- Monte Towe, men's basketball (1972–75)
- Trea Turner, baseball (2012–14)
- T. J. Warren, men's basketball (2012–14)
- Spud Webb, men's basketball (1984–85)
- Mario Williams, football (2003–05)
- Adrian Wilson, football (1997–01)
- Payton Wilson, football (2018-23)
- Russell Wilson, football (2007–10), baseball (2008–10)
- Will Wilson, baseball (2016–19)
- Tracy Woodson, baseball (1982–84)

Fourteen NC State athletes have won a total of 21 Olympic medals: Tommy Burleson and Kenny Carr in men's basketball; Joan Benoit in the women's marathon; Lucas Kozeniesky in rifle; Diana Shnaider in women's tennis; and Stephen Rerych, Steve Gregg, Dan Harrigan, Duncan Goodhew, David Fox, Cullen Jones, Ryan Held, David Bethlehem, and Katharine Berkoff in swimming. Additionally, Kay Yow coached the women's basketball team to a gold medal in the 1988 Olympics in Seoul South Korea

== NC State Fight Song ==
The words to the Fight Song were written by Hardy Ray, Class of 1926, and the music was written by Edmund L. Gruber in 1908. It is essentially a sped-up version of "The Caisson Song", or more recently, "The Army Goes Rolling Along."

== Red and White Song ==
The Red and White Song is a popular song sung by fans and played by the band at many NC State athletic events, especially at football and basketball games. It was written by J. Perry Watson, a former director of music at NC State, and was introduced in 1961; students first sang the "Red and White" song at the NC State – Maryland game on February 13, 1961. The song, although very popular, is in fact not the official Fight Song of NC State. The colors mentioned in the song refer to NC State's main athletic colors, while "Caroline", "Devils", and "Deacs" refer to NC State's rivals: North Carolina, Duke, and Wake Forest.

== The NC State Alma Mater ==
NC State's Alma Mater was written by two students in the early 1920s. Dr. Alvin M. Fountain, a class of 1922 alumnus and editor of The Technician, wrote the words, while Bonnie Norris, from the class of 1923, composed the music.

In 2022, N.C. State changed the lyrics from "Where the winds of Dixie softly blow" to "Where the Southern winds so softly blow".

== Mascot ==
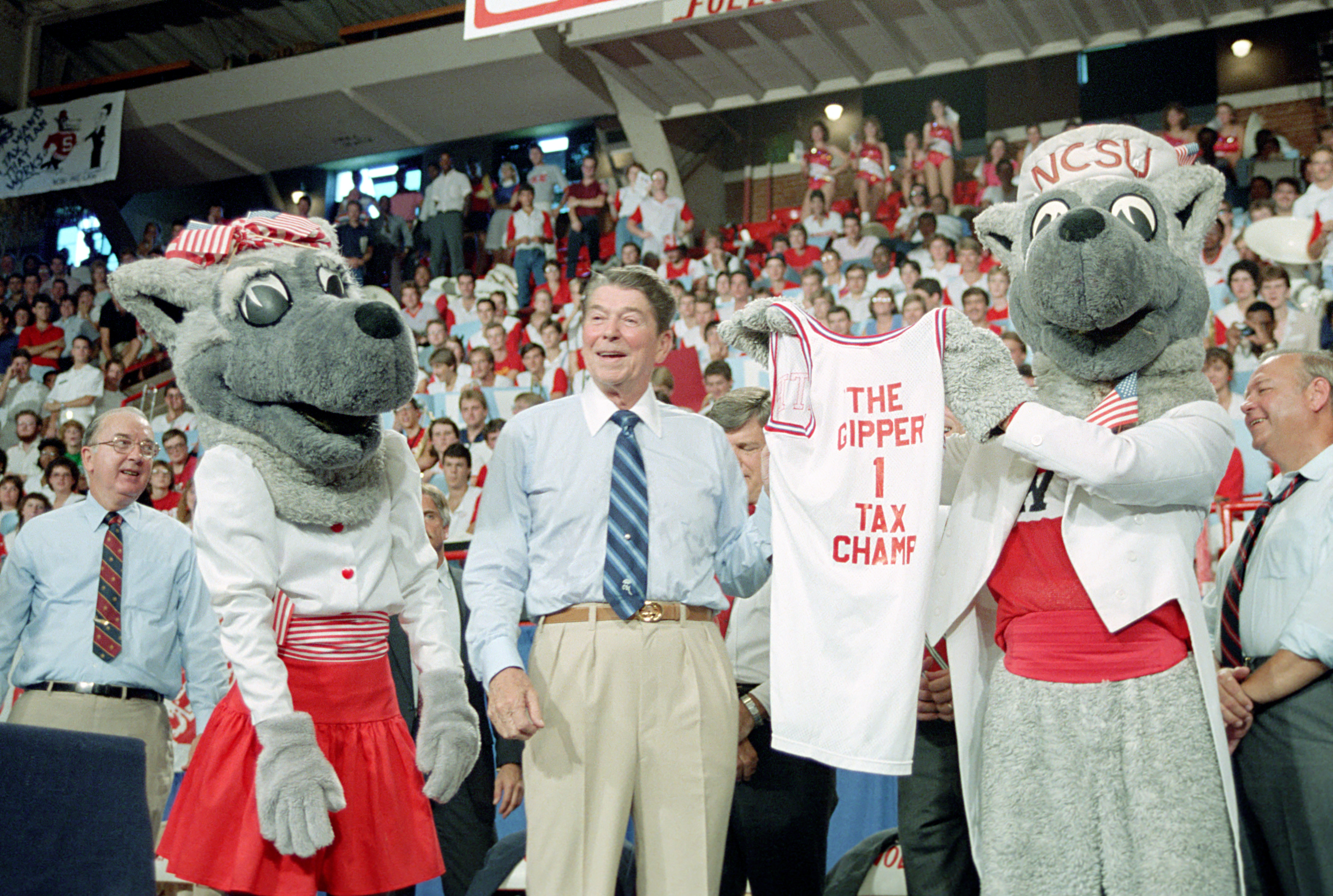
Mr. and Ms. Wuf with President Ronald Reagan in 1985

Since 1975, the NC State Wolfpack athletic teams have been represented at athletic events by its mascots, Mr. and Ms. Wuf, who were married on February 28, 1981, at Reynolds Coliseum at halftime of a college basketball game between NC State and Wake Forest. Wake Forest's Demon Deacon mascot appropriately presided over the nuptials. In print, the "Strutting Wolf" is used and is known by the name "Tuffy." In September 2010, a purebred Tamaskan dog became the new live mascot, "Tuffy".

== See also ==
- List of college athletic programs in North Carolina
- North Carolina–NC State rivalry
- Textile Bowl
- East Carolina–NC State rivalry
