= Daniel Durben =

American sports shooter

Personal information
- Born: April 2, 1959 (age 67) Saint Paul, Minnesota, United States

Sport
- Sport: Sports shooting

Daniel Durben (born April 2, 1959) is an American sports shooter. He competed in the men's 50 metre rifle three positions event at the 1988 Summer Olympics. His brother Peter also competed as an Olympic shooter.
