= South Florida Bulls rifle =

- Founded: 1985
- Folded: 1990
- University: University of South Florida
- Location: Tampa, Florida, US
- Nickname: Bulls
- Colors: Green and gold

NCAA Team Runners-up
- 1989

NCAA Team Third Place
- 1987, 1988

NCAA Individual Champions – Smallbore
- Michelle Scarborough: 1990

NCAA Individual Champions – Air Rifle
- Michelle Scarborough: 1989

The South Florida Bulls rifle team represented the University of South Florida in the sport of rifle. The program consisted of a men's and women's co-ed team which competed in NCAA Division I. The rifle team only existed for five years, but was very successful in that time, earning three top-three team finishes in NCAA National Championship events and winning two individual national titles. Roger Johnson served as head coach for the team's entire existence.

== History ==
The USF rifle team first competed in the NCAA Championship in the 1985–86 season. Since so few schools sponsored rifle at the time, all teams that sponsored it were eligible for the championship. The Bulls finished tied for 5th out of the 7 teams that competed in the 1986 NCAA Championship. They returned to the event in 1987 and 1988, where they finished in third place both times. They also won the NRA Smallbore Intercollegiate Sectionals in 1987. In 1989 the team had their best finish ever, taking second place in the NCAA Championship. The program never competed as a team again after the 1989 championship, with the athletic department citing budget problems as the reason.

== Athletes ==
USF Athletic Hall of Fame inductee Michelle Scarborough won two individual national titles with the Bulls rifle team, winning championships in the 1989 air rifle event and the 1990 smallbore event (smallbore is considered the more prestigious of the two events in college riflery). Rifle is the only NCAA sponsored sport where men and women directly compete against each other, meaning that Scarborough was not only the best woman at these events, but shot better than all the men as well. Scarborough's 1989 championship in air rifle was the highest score for both men and women ever recorded in the event, with an unprecedented 399 out of a possible 400 points. Her record stood until the event format changed from 40 shots to 60 shots in 2005.

Three Bulls shooters have competed in the Olympic Games. Dorothee Deuring represented Austria in 1988, Kristen Peterson represented the United States in 1988 and 1992, and Peter Durben represented the United States in 1992. Other athletes competed internationally as well. Most notably, Michelle Scarborough won three team gold and an individual bronze medal at the 1991 Pan American Games and Matthew Suggs won a team gold and individual silver medal at the 1987 ISSF 10 meter air rifle world championship.

== See also ==
- University of South Florida
- South Florida Bulls
