= J. W. Isenhour Tennis Center =

Tennis facility in Raleigh, North Carolina

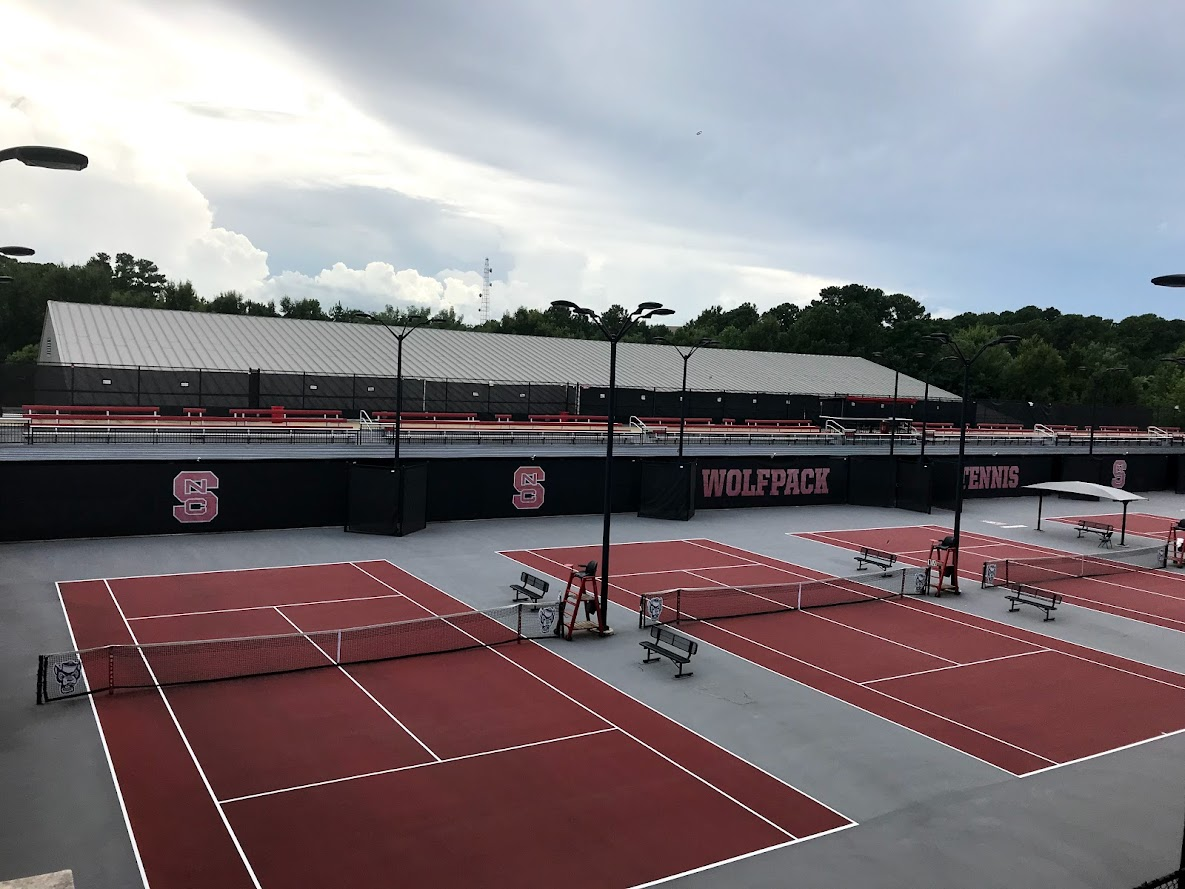
- Interactive map of J. W. Isenhour Tennis Center
- Coordinates: 35.787531°N 78.681065°W
- Owner: North Carolina State University
- Capacity: 1,200

Construction
- Renovated: 2011

The J.W. Isenhour Tennis Center houses the men's and women's tennis programs of North Carolina State University in Raleigh, North Carolina. It is located across the street from Doak Field on the NC State campus.

Completed in 2004, the facility was named in honor of a former head coach of the men's tennis program, who led it to the ACC Championships in 1978 and 79, and to play in the NCAA Championship in 1978.

== Facilities ==
In 2004, the facility was granted the United States Tennis Association's Outstanding Facility award, making it one of only four collegiate facilities to have received the award, and one of fifteen nationwide.

The outdoor stadium was completed in 2011 with seating for 1000 spectators.

Currently, the complex has four inside tennis courts, and six outside tennis courts. Also, the complex includes locker rooms, a lounge for the players, and public restrooms.

== Sources ==
- Facilities Description of J.W. Isenhour Tennis Center
