= Audrey Gogniat =

Swiss sports shooter (born 2002)

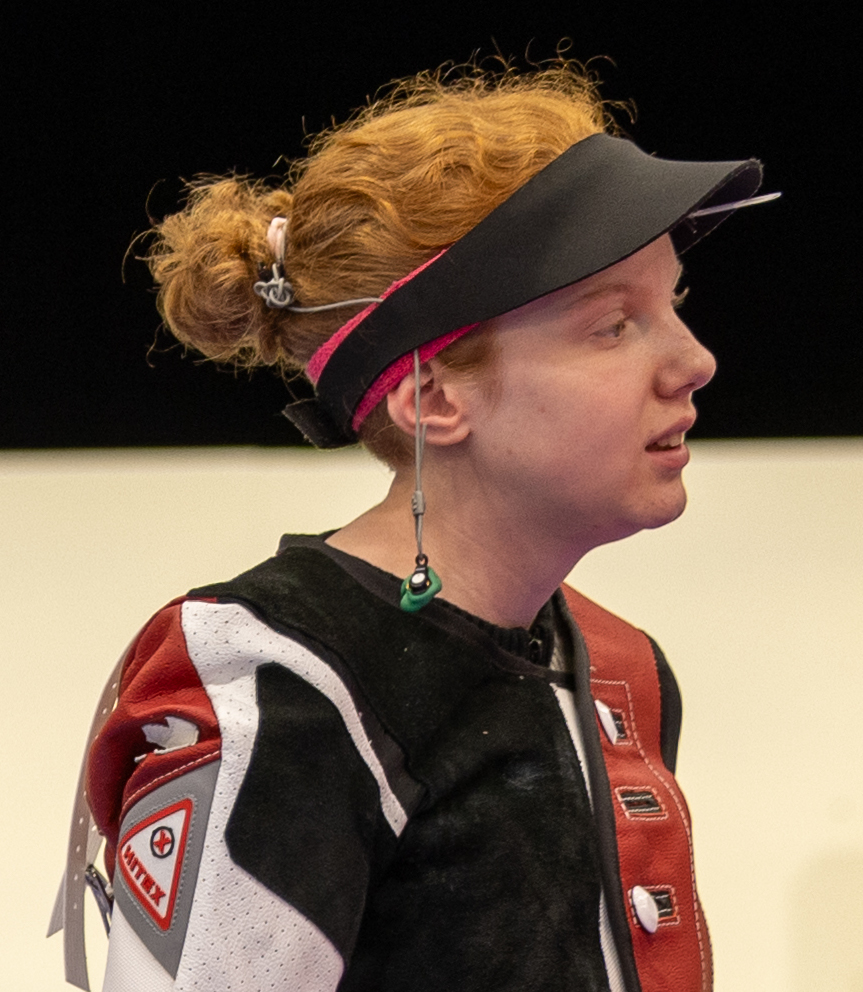
- Gogniat at the 2024 Summer Olympics

Personal information
- Nationality: Switzerland
- Born: 30 October 2002 (age 23) Le Noirmont, Jura, Switzerland

Sport
- Sport: Sports shooting
Medal record
Women's shooting
Representing Switzerland
Olympic Games
Bronze medal – third place	2024 Paris	10 metre air rifle
European Games
Gold medal – first place	2023 Kraków-Małopolska	10 m air rifle team
European Championships
Gold medal – first place	2025 Osijek	10 m air rifle mixed team
Silver medal – second place	2023 Tallinn	Air rifle Junior
Silver medal – second place	2025 Osijek	10 m air rifle
Bronze medal – third place	2024 Győr	10 m air rifle

Audrey Gogniat (born 30 October 2002) is a Swiss sports shooter. She has won two medals in air rifle events at the European Shooting Championships. She won the bronze medal in the 10 metre air rifle event at the Summer Olympics 2024 in Paris.

Since 2024, Gogniat has been a member of the Ole Miss Rebels rifle team. She won the air rifle national championship at the 2025 NCAA Rifle Championships.
