= 2021 NCAA Rifle Championships =

2021 NCAA Rifle tournament
- Teams: 8
- Format: Points system
- Finals site: (Ohio) Columbus, Ohio; Lt. Hugh W. Wylie Rifle Range
- Champions: Kentucky Wildcats (3rd title)
- Runner-up: TCU Horned Frogs (27th title game)
- Winning coach: Harry Mullins (3rd title)
- Most Outstanding Performer: Mary Tucker (Kentucky)
- Attendance: No fan attendance permitted due to COVID-19.
- Television: NCAA

The 2021 NCAA Rifle Championships took place from March 12 to March 13 in Columbus, Ohio, at the Lt. Hugh W. Wylie Rifle Range. The tournament went into its 41st NCAA Rifle Championships, after having been canceled mid-event in 2020 due to COVID-19, and featured eight teams across all divisions. 48 athletes including 40 from qualifying teams and 8 at-large individuals competed in the event.

== Team results ==
Rank	Team	Points
1st place, gold medalist(s)	Kentucky	4,731
2nd place, silver medalist(s)	TCU	4,722
3rd place, bronze medalist(s)	Ole Miss	4,710
4	West Virginia	4,704
5	Alaska	4,682
6	Nebraska	4,676
7	Memphis	4,661
8	Air Force	4,656

== Individual results ==
- Note: Table does not include eliminations

Games	Gold	Silver	Bronze
Air rifle details	Mary Tucker (249.4); Kentucky	Will Shaner (248.7); Kentucky	Lea Horvath (228.0); Ole Miss
Smallbore details	Mary Tucker (463.3); Kentucky	Stephanie Grundsoe (459.1); TCU	Lea Horvath (449.1); Ole Miss
