= College bass fishing =

College bass fishing is competitive bass fishing that is played by teams from universities and colleges. The NCAA is not involved in college bass fishing, allowing teams to use sponsorships to their advantage and keep their winnings. College bass fishing consists of mostly club teams, but there are a select few varsity bass fishing programs. There are an estimated 610 college bass fishing teams in the United States. The major college bass fishing tournament series are the FLW Outdoors College Series, Boat U.S. Bass Pro Shops College Bass Fishing Series, Carhartt Bassmaster College Bass Fishing Series, and the Fishlife Collegiate Tour.

== History ==
The first known college bass fishing tournament took place at Lake Monroe, Indiana on April 18, 1992 between Purdue University and Indiana University. Purdue won the tournament by three pounds. Some of the historically most successful college bass fishing teams are Auburn University, Murray State University, Bethel University, University of Florida, Virginia Tech, University of Georgia, North Carolina State University, Louisiana State University, and the University of Illinois. College bass fishing is a growing college sport and in recent years, some schools have even started varsity programs, such as Adrian College in Michigan and Campbellsville University in Kentucky. These schools are both the first varsity college bass fishing programs in their state. The University of Delaware Bass Fishing Team was the first collegiate bass fishing team in the state of Delaware.

== Official rules and scoring ==
- Two fisherman allowed per boat
- Bass kept must be at least 12 inches in length (depending on the lake)
- Five bass limit allowed per team at weigh in (largemouth bass, smallmouth bass, spotted bass, are the only species accepted)
- .25 ounces deducted for each dead bass weighed in
- One pound deducted for each short bass weighed in
- One pound deducted for every minute late after weigh-in deadline time
- Greatest overall weight of bass limit wins the event

== Different tournament series, divisions, regionals, and tournaments ==
=== Abu Garcia College Fishing ===
In 2020, Abu Garcia, a fishing brand manufacturer, assumed title sponsorship of the FLW College Fishing circuit.

- Central Division
- Northern Division
- Southeastern Division
- Southern Division
- Western Division
- Open
- Championship

=== Carhartt Bassmaster College Series ===
- Southern Regional
- Central Regional
- Eastern Regional
- Western Regional
- Midwestern Regional
- Wild Card

=== Cabela's Collegiate Bass Fishing Series ===
- Collegiate Big Bass Bash
- Collegiate Bass Fishing Open
- Collegiate Bass Fishing Shootout
- Collegiate Bass Fishing Championship

== Championships ==
=== Abu Garcia College Fishing Championships ===
Known as FLW College Series before 2020

- 2010: University of Florida
- 2011: University of Florida
- 2012: Kansas State University
- 2013: University of Louisiana Monroe
- 2014: University of Minnesota
- 2015: University of South Carolina
- 2016: University of South Carolina
- 2017: Kansas State University
- 2018: University of Louisiana Monroe
- 2019: Murray State University
- 2020: Stephen F. Austin State University

=== Cabela's Collegiate Bass Fishing Series ===
- 2006: North Carolina State University
- 2007: University of Kansas
- 2008: Texas A&M
- 2009: Murray State University
- 2010: Tarleton State University
- 2011: University of Arkansas
- 2012: North Carolina State University
- 2013: Bethel University
- 2014: Lamar University
- 2015: Northern Kentucky University
- 2016: Auburn University
- 2017: University of North Alabama
- 2018: Bethel University

=== The Fishlife Collegiate Tour ===
- 2013: Alabama
- 2014: Alabama/Birmingham Southern
