= William Shaner =

American sports shooter

Personal information
- Born: April 25, 2001 (age 25) Colorado Springs, Colorado, United States
- Height: 6 ft 2 in (188 cm)
- Weight: 140 lb (64 kg)

Sport
- Country: United States
- Sport: Shooting (ISSF and NCAA)
- Event(s): 10m Air Rifle, 10m Air Rifle Mixed Team, 50m 3P Smallbore, 50m Prone Smallbore
- Club: National Training Center Shooting Club, Kentucky Wildcats
Medal record
Men's shooting
Representing the United States
Olympic Games
Gold medal – first place	2020 Tokyo	10m air rifle
World Championships
Bronze medal – third place	2018 Changwon, Korea	50 m rifle prone
Gold medal – first place	2021 Lima, Peru	10 m air rifle junior
Gold medal – first place	2021 Lima, Peru	10 m air rifle mixed juniors
World Cup
Gold medal – first place	2021 Croatia	10m air rifle
Junior World Cup
Gold medal – first place	2018 Suhl	50 m rifle prone

William Shaner (born April 25, 2001, in Colorado Springs, Colorado) is an American sports shooter. He won gold medals in the men's 10 metre air rifle event at the 2020 Summer Olympics, the 10m air rifle event at the 2021 ISSF World Cup Croatia, and the 10m air rifle event at the 2021 ISSF Junior World Championship Lima, and the bronze medal in the 50 m rifle prone event at the 2018 World Championships.

Shaner was also part of the University of Kentucky rifle team that won the 2021 NCAA Rifle Championships.
