= Murray State Racers =

Athletic teams of Murray State University, Kentucky US

- University: Murray State University
- Conference: MVC (primary); MVFC (football); OVC (rifle)
- NCAA: Division I (FCS)
- Athletic director: Nico Yantko
- Location: Murray, Kentucky
- Varsity teams: 15
- Football stadium: Roy Stewart Stadium
- Basketball arena: CFSB Center
- Baseball stadium: Reagan Field
- Other venues: Racer Arena
- Mascot: Racer One and Dunker
- Nickname: Racers
- Fight song: The Old Grey Mare
- Colors: Navy blue and gold
- Website: goracers.com

The Murray State Racers are the athletic teams that represent Murray State University (MSU), located in Murray, Kentucky, United States, in intercollegiate sports as a member of the NCAA Division I ranks (for football, the Football Championship Subdivision), primarily competing in the Missouri Valley Conference (MVC) since the 2022–23 academic year. The Racers previously competed in the Ohio Valley Conference (OVC) from 1948–49 to 2021–22; and in the Kentucky Intercollegiate Athletic Conference (KIAC; now known as the River States Conference (RSC) since the 2016–17 school year) of the National Association of Intercollegiate Athletics (NAIA) from 1933–34 to 1947–48.

== Varsity teams ==
Murray State competes in 15 intercollegiate varsity sports: Men's sports include baseball, basketball, cross country, football and golf; while women's sports include basketball, cross country, golf, soccer, softball, tennis, track & field and volleyball; and co-ed sports include rifle.

Men's sports	Women's sports
Baseball	Basketball
Basketball	Cross Country
Cross Country	Golf
Football	Soccer
Golf	Softball
	Tennis
	Track and field^{†}
	Volleyball
Co-ed sports
Rifle
† – Track and field includes both indoor and outdoor.

Murray State men's athletics began in 1925–26, the school's third year, with the first women's team following in 1928–29. The teams were originally known as the Thoroughbreds as a nod to the state of Kentucky's history with horseracing. Over time, however, sports writers and editors found the name to be too cumbersome, so they often shortened it to "T-Breds", "Breds", "Race Horses", and "Racers". The Racers nickname began to grow in popularity through the late 1950s, and it was adopted as the official nickname in 1961. The baseball team continued to use the Thoroughbreds or "Breds" nicknames until 2014. The women's teams were known as Lady Racers until "Lady" was officially dropped in 2007.

A charter member of the Ohio Valley Conference, Murray State University sponsors five men's, nine women's and one co-ed teams in NCAA sanctioned sports. On January 7, 2022, it was announced that Murray State would join the Missouri Valley Conference on July 1, 2022.

== Men's basketball ==
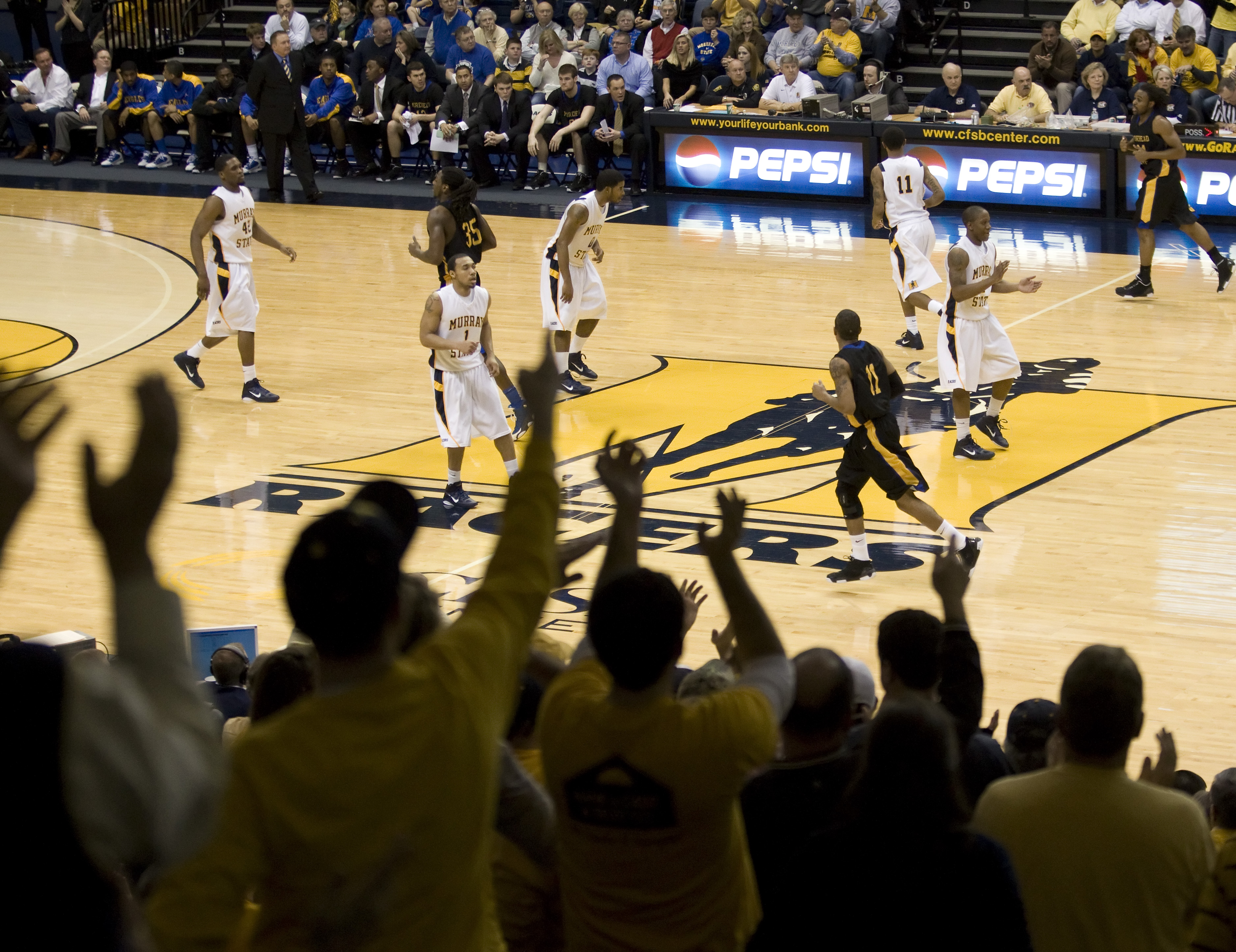
Murray State men's basketball game, 2011

Murray State is known for its men's basketball program, which has won 28 Ohio Valley Conference regular season championships, 18 OVC tournament championship, and made 18 appearances in the NCAA tournament, most recently in 2022. The tournament appearances included one win in 1988 the Racers defeated North Carolina State in the first round but lost to Kansas in the second round. In 2010, 22 years to the date of the 1988 win, the Racers beat the Vanderbilt Commodores and lost to the Butler Bulldogs in the second round. In the 2006 tournament, junior guard Trey Pearson missed a critical 3-point shot in the final seconds of the first-round game against No. 3 seeded defending champion North Carolina. UNC was fouled on the rebound and went to the line to sink the game clinching shots to defeat the No. 14 seeded Racers 69–65.

The Racers won their first-round game in the 2010 NCAA tournament in dramatic fashion, defeating fourth-seeded Vanderbilt 66–65 on a buzzer beating jump shot by senior Danero Thomas. This was the first time that any Ohio Valley Conference team had advanced to the 2nd round of the NCAA tournament since Middle Tennessee State advanced in 1989.

One of the more famous tournament games in the program's history was their first-round matchup against #1 seeded Michigan State in 1990, in which they took to overtime before finally succumbing to the Spartans 75–71, making them one of the closest #16 teams to defeating a #1 seed since the 64-team format came to be in 1985 until it was finally done by UMBC in 2018.

The Murray State basketball program first competed in the 1925–1926 season under head coach Carlisle Cutchin. Murray State finished 9–5 in their inaugural season, with the first game being a 31–14 loss to Will Mayfield College. From 1925 to 1941 Cutchin went on to lead the basketball team to a 296–96 record and three appearances in the NAIA men's basketball tournament, where the Thoroughbreds finished third in 1938 and second in 1941.

Current North Carolina State head basketball coach Mark Gottfried coached the Racers to three Ohio Valley Conference Championships, all three years he coached there, the only OVC coach to accomplish such a mark.

The Murray State basketball program has been recognized as one of the top 30 basketball programs in modern history by ESPN. The Racers are the highest true mid-major team in ESPN's rankings.

The most well-known players in Racer history are Joe Fulks, Popeye Jones, James Singleton, Isaiah Canaan, Cameron Payne, and Ja Morant. Fulks starred for two seasons at Murray State (1941–42 and 1942–43), twice earning All-Kentucky Intercollegiate Athletic Conference honors, before leaving school to join the Marines during World War II. Fulks scored 621 points in 47 games during his Murray State career, a 13.2 average in an era when teams averaged less than 50 points a game. His fame grew to greater heights as a professional, becoming one of the NBA's early stars as a scoring champ with the Philadelphia Warriors. He was named to the NBA 25th Anniversary Team in 1971 and was inducted into the Basketball Hall of Fame in 1978.

While at Murray State, Jones scored 2,057 points which still ranks fourth all time for the Racers. He is also Murray State's all-time leader in rebounds with 1,374, and led the nation in that category in the 1990–91 season. Jones is the only player in MSU history to record more than 2,000 points and 1,000 rebounds. Jones helped lead the Racers to OVC championships in 1991 and 1992. He went on to play 11 seasons in the NBA after being drafted in the second round by the Houston Rockets in the 1992 NBA draft. He's also served as an NBA assistant coach, most recently with the Indiana Pacers.

James Singleton joined Coach Tevester Anderson's team and instantly became one of the top players in the Ohio Valley Conference from 2001 to 2003. Singleton was a dominant force for the Racers, earning two-time All-OVC selection with 811 points (13.5ppg) and 632 rebounds (10.5) in 60 games. As of 2023, his 632 rebounds rank first all-time at MSU among two-year players, and his 811 points rank 12th. He led the OVC in back-to-back seasons in rebound average, a feat no other Racer has achieved since. Singleton also set the program record for the best 3-point percentage in a single game by making 8-of-8 from beyond the arch, breaking the Ohio Valley Conference record previously held by UT Martin's Okechi Egbe of 7-of-7. His professional basketball career spanned 14 years from 2003 to 2017, including stints with the NBA's Los Angeles Clippers (2005–07), Dallas Mavericks (2008–10), and Washington Wizards (2012). He also had successful basketball stints in China, South Korea, and Italy among other places.

Canaan, Morant, and Payne are current NBA players, with Payne Murray State's first NBA first round draft selection, picked 14th overall by the Oklahoma City Thunder in the 2016 NBA draft. Morant was the Racers' highest-ever draft selection, picked second overall by the Memphis Grizzlies in 2019, and went on to be named the league's rookie of the year in 2020 and most improved player in 2022.

Murray State's historic basketball rivalry is with nearby Western Kentucky. The two teams became archrivals during their time together in the Ohio Valley Conference. Although the schools no longer share their conference affiliation, the rivalry game remains an annual event on each team's schedule. The two teams have met in basketball 148 times. For the remainder of the Racers' tenure in the OVC, their primary conference rival was Austin Peay State University. Murray State has three built-in regional rivals in its current home of the Missouri Valley Conference. Southern Illinois University Carbondale (SIU), already an MVC member, and Belmont University, which moved alongside Murray State from the OVC to the MVC in 2022, are both about two hours' drive away. The University of Evansville, also an established MVC member, is not much farther away than Belmont or SIU.

The Murray State basketball program has become a stepping stone to major-college coaching success in recent years. Five of the last six Murray State coaches have gone on to head coaching positions at major conference schools.

- Mark Gottfried served as head coach of the Racers from 1995 to 1998. Gottfried became the first head coach to win three OVC titles in only three seasons. In his last season, the Racers finished 25th in the final AP Poll. Gottfried went on to be head coach of the Alabama Crimson Tide of the Southeastern Conference from 1998 to 2009, and the NC State Wolfpack of the Atlantic Coast Conference from 2011 to 2017.
- Mick Cronin served as head coach of the Racers from 2003 to 2006. Cronin coached the Racers to two OVC championship and two NCAA tournament appearances in his three seasons as head coach at Murray State. He served as head coach of the Cincinnati Bearcats of the Big East Conference from 2006 to 2019 and is currently the head coach of the UCLA Bruins of the Pac-12 Conference.
- Billy Kennedy served as head coach of the Racers from 2006 to 2011. Kennedy set a Murray State record for most wins in a season, with 31 victories in the 2009–2010 season. Kennedy took the Racers into the second round of the NCAA tournament for only the second time in school history. He served as the head coach of the Texas A&M Aggies of the Big 12 Conference from 2011 to 2019 and is now an assistant coach with the Wichita State Shockers of the American Athletic Conference.
- Steve Prohm, Billy Kennedy's top assistant at Murray State, served as head coach of the Racers from 2012 to 2015, and returned to the Racers as head coach in 2022 after his successor Matt McMahon left for the head coaching vacancy at LSU. Prohm led the Racers to 31 victories and the Round of 32 in the NCAA tournament in 2012. His 2015 team won 25 straight games during the season and finished with two wins in the National Invitation Tournament. Between his stints with the Racers, he was head coach of the Iowa State Cyclones of the Big 12 Conference from 2015 to 2021.
- Matt McMahon, Steve Prohm's top assistant at Murray State, served as head coach of the Racers from 2015 to 2022. Prohm led the Racers to 154 victories and three OVC Tournament Championships. In three NCAA tournament appearances, McMahon's Racers reached the Round of 32 in 2019 and 2022. After the 2021–22 season, McMahon left Murray State to become the head coach at LSU in the Southeastern Conference.

Ohio Valley Conference regular season championships

1951, 1964, 1968, 1969, 1980, 1982, 1983, 1988, 1989, 1990, 1991, 1992, 1994, 1995, 1996, 1997, 1998, 1999, 2000, 2006, 2010, 2011, 2012, 2015, 2018, 2019, 2020, 2022

Ohio Valley Conference tournament championships

1951, 1964, 1988, 1990, 1991, 1992, 1995, 1997, 1998, 1999, 2002, 2004, 2006, 2010, 2012, 2018, 2019, 2022

== Football ==
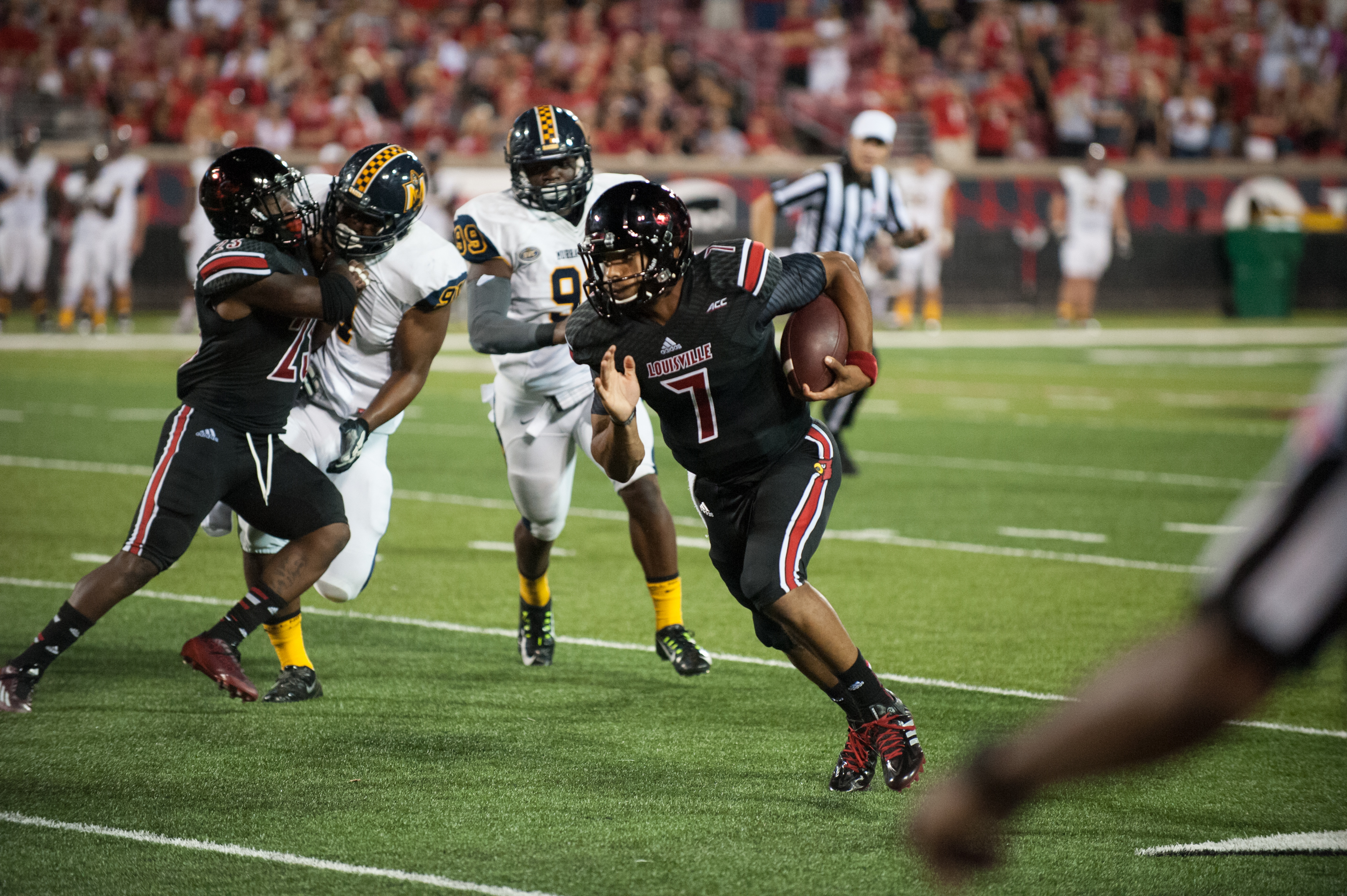
Murray State (in white) v Louisville game, held to honor military service members in 2014

The Murray State football program first competed on the gridiron in 1924. The first game was a 0–0 tie against Union University. The Racers have had 45 winning seasons. Murray State has produced 33 All-American selections with 14 of them earning First Team All-American honors. Murray State's largest margin of victory over another Division I program came in 1932 when the Racers defeated the Louisville Cardinals by a score of 105–0. The Racers modern-day scoring record was set on October 9, 2010, with a 72-59 homecoming victory over the Missouri State Bears.

Murray State's football rivalries have historically been with the Eastern Kentucky Colonels and the Western Kentucky Hilltoppers. The rivalry with the Hilltoppers began in 1931, and it later became an annual trophy game known as the Battle for the Red Belt.

The Murray State football program has become a steppingstone to major-college coaching success. Five former Murray State coaches have gone on to head coaching positions at BCS schools.

- Mike Gottfried served as head coach of the Racers from 1978 to 1980. He was recognized as OVC Coach of the Year in 1979. Gottfried went on to coach the Cincinnati Bearcats, Kansas Jayhawks, and Pittsburgh Panthers.
- Ron Zook served as a secondary coach at Murray State under Gottfried from 1978 to 1980. Zook went on to become the head coach of the Florida Gators from 2002 to 2004 and the Illinois Fighting Illini from 2005 to 2011, and is now a college football studio analyst with CBS.
- Frank Beamer served as head coach of the Racers from 1981 to 1986. After leaving Murray State, Beamer went on to build the Virginia Tech program into a national power through the 1990s and early 2010s.
- Ralph Friedgen was an assistant coach at Murray State under Frank Beamer in 1981. Friedgen was head coach at Maryland from 2001 to 2010.
- Houston Nutt was head coach of the Racers from 1993 to 1996. He was recognized as the Eddie Robinson National Coach of the Year in 1996 and the OVC Coach of the Year in 1995 and 1996 while coaching the Racers to back-to-back OVC championships. Nutt went on to coach the Arkansas Razorbacks to three SEC division titles, and he also served as the head coach of Ole Miss from 2008 to 2011. In his first two years at Ole Miss, Nutt coached the Rebels to back-to-back Cotton Bowl Classic victories. Nutt is now a studio analyst for CBS.

In addition to the success of former Racer football coaches, former players have also gone on to achieve major successes. Former Racer quarterback Justin Fuente was named head football coach of the Memphis Tigers in 2011. As a player, Fuente was named Ohio Valley Conference Player of the Year in 1999. As a senior in 1999, Fuente set school season records for passing yards (3,498), attempts (400), completions (240) and touchdowns (27). Fuente still holds the MSU record for most 300-yard passing games with 10. He was named head coach at Virginia Tech in 2016, succeeding former Racer head coach Frank Beamer.

The Racers have appeared in only one bowl game, when they were invited to the 1949 Tangerine Bowl. This was only the third installment of the Tangerine bowl, which is now known as the Citrus Bowl. The Racers played to a 21–21 tie against Sul Ross State University. The Racers were coached by Fred Faurot, who was the younger brother of legendary Missouri Tigers coach Don Faurot.

Ohio Valley Conference championships

1948, 1950, 1951, 1979, 1986, 1995, 1996, 2002

Bowl game appearances

1949 Tangerine Bowl

== Baseball ==
Murray State baseball reached national prominence in the 1970s under coach Johnny Reagan. The Thoroughbreds won or shared 11 conference titles during his 36-year tenure (1958–1993). He also led Murray State to 27-straight winning seasons and its first two NCAA Division I Baseball Championship appearances, in 1975 and 1979. Murray State also reached the NCAA Regionals in 2003. Murray State's 1975 team finished the season with a 40–9 record, was ranked No. 23 in Division I and led the nation in batting average (.332). The 1979 team (27–10–2), ranked 17th in Division I, came one win from advancing to the College World Series. Murray State's 1973 (19th) and 1974 (28th) teams also finished the season ranked in the NCAA poll.

Notable Murray State baseball alumni include Pat Jarvis, Jack Perconte, and Kirk Rueter.

At the time the new athletics nickname was adopted in 1961, the Murray State baseball team had just purchased new uniforms and equipment bags with the Thoroughbreds logo on it, so the team requested and received a one-year extension before adopting the new nickname. Alumni and fans admired the team for keeping the original nickname, so the baseball team remained known as the Thoroughbreds until 2014. In May 2014, athletic director Allen Ward announced that the baseball team would join the rest of the Murray State athletic teams and be identified as the Racers. Ward cited the need for the baseball program to enjoy the same brand identity and benefits that are afforded to the rest of the teams that identify as Racers.

In 2025, Murray State made its first Men's College World Series appearance in program history, becoming the fourth 4th-seed ever to appear in the tournament.

== Rifle ==
The Murray State Rifle program has enjoyed a long history of success since it was established in the 1956–57 season. The program has produced three team national championships in 1978 (NRA), 1985 (NCAA), and 1987 (NCAA). The team was runner up to the NCAA national championship in 1986 and 1988. In addition to national championship, Murray State rifle won 15 OVC team championships, seven individual NCAA champions, and produced six USA Olympic Team members. The current head coach is Alan Lollar. The Racers compete at the Pat Spurgin Rifle Range at Roy Stewart Stadium. The rifle range is one of the finest shooting venues in the sport, and it has hosted the NCAA championships seven times.

NCAA team national championships

1978, 1985, 1987

NCAA individual national champions

- Pat Spurgin – 1984 (Air rifle) / 1985 (Smallbore)
- Marianne Wallace – 1986 (Air rifle)
- Deena Wigger – 1988 (Air rifle)
- Benjamin Belden – 1995 (Air rifle)
- Marra Hastings – 1997 (Air rifle)
- Morgan Hicks – 2004 (Air rifle)

Ohio Valley Conference Team Championships

1994, 1995, 1996, 1997, 1998, 1999, 2000, 2004, 2010, 2011, 2016, 2017, 2018, 2019, 2021

US Olympic Team members

- Pat Spurgin – 1984 (gold-medal winner)
- William Beard – 1984
- May Ann Schweitzer – 1984
- Roger Withrow – 1984
- Deena Wigger – 1988
- Morgan Hicks – 2004

== Softball ==
In May 2008, Murray State announced that it would add women's softball to its lineup of sponsored NCAA Division I teams. Softball would replace rowing, which would be immediately discontinued as a university sponsored sport. At the time of the announcement, the active roster for the rowing team had less than 10 members. Adding softball would aid the university's Title IX compliance goals by adding additional opportunities for female athletes. Additionally, the sport of softball was seen as more identifiable than rowing in the university's service region. Prior to the announcement, Murray State was the only school in the Ohio Valley Conference that had not sponsored softball at the NCAA level.

Murray State formed a partnership with the city of Murray in which the softball program would have use of a field at the city park in exchange for significant upgrades to the facility that would remain the property of the city parks. The Racer softball team played its first intercollegiate game on February 26, 2010, against SIU Edwardsville at the Ole Miss Classic in Oxford, Mississippi.

Murray State Softball is led by head coach Kara Amundson, assistant Ashley Gilland, and graduate assistant Zach Parsons. Coach Amundson is entering her 10th season as head coach in the 2022 season and served as an assistant at Northern Illinois for two seasons, while coaching two all-MAC and academic all-conference selections. Coach Gilland is also entering her 10th season in 2022 and spent two years at Northern Iowa before Murray State. Coach Gilland serves as the hitting and outfield coach.

== Track and field ==
Murray State competes only in women's track and field. Historically, the track and field program included both men and women; however, in 2004 the men's program was reduced to a non-scholarship program. In October 2006, athletic director Allen Ward announced that the non-scholarship men's track and field program was being eliminated, effective immediately. Murray State cited budgetary and Title IX concerns as reasons for eliminating the men's track and field program. The men's team had been exceptionally successful in competition, producing ten Olympic athletes, eleven instances of OVC Men's Athlete of the Year honors, and 40 instances of NCAA Men's All-America honors. One of the team's final members was Wesley Korir, who transferred to Louisville to finish his college career and went on to win the 2012 Boston Marathon.

The program has produced successful athletes. In 2012, Alexis Love, was named the Female Track Athlete of the Year in the OVC and Athlete of the OVC Outdoor Championship. Love competed at the competed at the United States Track and Field Olympic Trials. She set a school record in the 60m and 200m during her indoor season. In 2019, Love was inducted into Murray State's Hall of Fame.

Murray State's women track team won the 2019 OVC Outdoor Championship. Where athlete Tamdra Lawrence became the first in OVC history to win the 100m event in four consecutive seasons. The track team is coached by Adam Kiesler. Kiesler has been the head coach since 2016.

Men's team Olympians

- Tommy Turner – 1972 (1600 Relay)
- Everton Cornelius – 1976 (Long Jump)
- Cuthbert Jacobs – 1976 (400 Meters & 1600 Relay)
- Fred Sowerby – 1976 (400 Meters & 1600 Relay)
- David Warren – 1980 (800 Meters)
- Alfred Brown – 1984 (400 Meters)
- Elvis Forde – 1984 (400 Meters & 1600 Relay)
- Patterson Johnson – 1988 (Sprints)
- Stevon Roberts – 1992 (800 Meters & 1600 Meters)
- Seibert Straughn – 1992 (400 Meters & 1600 Meters)

Women's team Olympians

- Heather Samuel – 1992 (100 Meters & 200 Meters)

== Tennis ==
The Men's Tennis program began play 1954 and won 19 Ohio Valley Conference championships during its existence. The team captured 10 OVC titles in a row during the 1980s under coach Bennie Purcell. Men's Tennis was eliminated as a university sponsored NCAA level sport in May 2016 in response to state budget cuts. Elimination of the men's tennis program was expected to save the athletic program roughly $165,000.

== Soccer ==
The Murray State Women's soccer team joined the Ohio Valley Conference in 2000. Since then the team has captured four regular season championships and three tournament champions. In 2015, 2016, 2017, and 2018 the Racers were back to back to back to back champions. They consecutively received freshman of the year for two years in a row as well. In 2015 the Racers went 10–0 in conference play and also won the tournament beating Southeast Missouri 1–0 in the OVC Tournament championship. In 2017 the Racers won the regular season title and the OVC Tournament title as well. In the 2019 season they scored the most goals ever scored in a season (27) and the single season assist, single season goals, and single season points record was broken.

In 2018 Harriet Withers got the honor to get her jersey retired. Withers sets the record for most career goals ever scored by a racer soccer player. She also ended her career with 38 career goals and 15 career assists. She also was the OVC offensive player for 3 years in a row. Withers an Australian native came to Murray state in 2014 where she started 12 games out 20 in her freshman year.

After her freshman year she started every single game during the rest of her time for Murray State soccer. She helped lead Murray State to three conference championships and two conference tournament championships. Withers had a degree in Physical Education in hopes of becoming a college coach.

Shortly after Withers graduated from Murray State she became an assistant coach for Bard college in Annandale, New York. She was assistant coach at a Division 3 program for only one year in 2018. She helped coach the team to the record of 4-11-1 in her time of working there.

Miyah Watford was the first American from Murray State to go overseas and play professional soccer. She played in Vestmanneyjar, Iceland in her first professional contract. Watford finished her senior campaign with 15 goals and 5 assists.

She broke the single season goal record in her senior campaign and the single season points record. Which ended her career with 31 goals and 76 points in just three years. Finished her career with three regular season titles and 2 tournament titles.

== National championships ==
=== Team ===
Missouri Valley Conference's logo in Murray States colors

Association	Division	Sport	Year	Opponent/ runner-up	Score
NCAA	Division I	Rifle (2)	1985	West Virginia	6,150–6,149 (+1)
NCAA	Division I	Rifle (2)	1987	West Virginia	6,205–6,203 (+2)

== Rivalries ==
Historically, Murray State's biggest rival was Western Kentucky University, now of Conference USA. The Racers also have a well-known rivalry with Austin Peay State University, which was an in-conference matchup from Peay's arrival in the OVC in 1962 until both schools' 2022 departure from the OVC.

=== Western Kentucky ===
In 1922, the Murray State Normal School was chartered as a state-supported teacher training institution, because the Western Kentucky State Normal School and Eastern Kentucky State Normal School could no longer produce a sufficient number of teachers to support the growing demand in the state. Located only 120 miles away from one another, and both in the western portion of the state, Murray State and Western Kentucky quickly became known as sister institutions as well as fierce competitors. In 1941, prior to a SIAA championship game between the Racers and Hilltoppers, Murray State President James H. Richmond remarked, "We are always happy when we can defeat our chief rival and greatest friend."

==== Football rivalry ====
The football rivalry with Western Kentucky began with a Hilltopper victory on October 24, 1931. In 1939, both institutions strengthened the rivalry by scheduling the match up as the final game of their regular seasons. This tradition continued, with only four interruptions, for the next 46 years. In 1948 both schools joined to form the Ohio Valley Conference, where Murray won the first championship in football. The football rivalry was cemented as an annual trophy game in 1978 known as the Battle for the Red Belt. The annual meetings between the two teams ended in 2000, but the Battle for the Red Belt is still played on in intermittent basis. The last game was played in 2008 when a record crowd of 22,297 in Bowling Green watched the Hilltoppers beat the Racers 50-9 and maintain possession of the Red Belt. The Racers and Hilltoppers have met 67 times in football, with Western Kentucky leading the series 36–24–7.

==== Basketball rivalry ====
Murray State and Western Kentucky have met 148 times in basketball since 1932. The basketball rivalry is the oldest in the state of Kentucky. Murray State won the first meeting in 1932 by a score of 26–24 in a game played on the stage at Lovett Auditorium. Western Kentucky leads the overall series 95–53, but Murray State has won 10 of the last 19 games since Western Kentucky left the Ohio Valley Conference in 1982.

The Murray State-Western Kentucky basketball rivalry has been every bit as bitter as the football rivalry. During the 1954–55 season, the teams met four times in a series of contests that also included severe fouls on the court, ejected players, punches thrown by fans in the stands, and even a fainting cheerleader. During the next season, Racers coach Rex Alexander publicly accused the Hilltopper coaching staff of poor sportsmanship and accused Western Kentucky of enjoying an unfair home-court advantage because of "loose officiating". Following a February 1956 victory by the Racers, the winning score of 74-70 was found painted on the sidewalk in front of Henry Hardin Cherry Hall and paint was thrown on the statue of Henry Hardin Cherry on WKU's campus.

=== Austin Peay ===
Murray State's primary basketball rivalry inside the Ohio Valley Conference was with Austin Peay State University in nearby Clarksville, Tennessee. The fans and students from the two towns, located only 60 miles apart, have developed a love-hate relationship with one another that has contributed to the growing intensity of the rivalry. In 2009, ESPN the Magazine featured the Murray State-Austin Peay rivalry as the best rivalry in the OVC and one of the best in the nation. Murray State holds the overall lead in the series 71–40, with Austin Peay winning only nine times in Murray since the series began in 1941.

Both schools left the OVC in July 2022, with Murray State moving to the Missouri Valley Conference and Peay to the ASUN Conference.

== Club sports ==
=== Bass Fishing ===
The Murray State Bass Anglers fishing team was formed in 2004. Since that time, the club has grown to more than 60 members. The NCAA is not involved in college bass fishing, allowing teams to use sponsorships to their advantage and keep their winnings. The club participates in about 20 tournaments each year against other college and university teams from around the United States. Murray State's close proximity to world class finishing opportunities at Kentucky Lake has made the school an attractive choice for students involved with competitive fishing.

The team frequently finishes in the top 10 out of more than 200 schools in the School of the Year Rankings of the Bass Pro Shops Collegiate Fishing Series:

Year	Final ranking
2012	1st
2013	4th
2014	4th
2015	2nd
2016	3rd
2017	6th
2018	3rd
2019	4th
2020	4th
2021	6th

=== Equestrian ===
Murray State has enjoyed a long tradition of equestrian teams at the club level. The current equestrian club team is operated through the College of Agriculture and has more than 50 participants. The equestrian club team competes in Zone 5, Region I of the Intercollegiate Horse Show Association (IHSA). In May 2008, Murray State University President Dr. Randy Dunn charged Director of Athletics Allen Ward with the responsibility of moving the sport of equestrian from club status to NCAA varsity status. Equestrian offers high female participation rates, which will help the university meet its Title IX obligations. When Murray State begins competition at the NCAA Division I level, the Racers will join the University of Tennessee at Martin as the only schools in the Ohio Valley Conference to sponsor equestrian teams at the NCAA level.

=== Rodeo ===
Murray State has fielded a Rodeo team since 1976. The co-ed team competes in the Ozarks Region of the National Intercollegiate Rodeo Association. In 2014, head coach J.D. Van Hooser was voted NIRA Ozark Region "Coach of the Year" by the other coaches in the region.

=== Rowing ===
Murray State President Kern Alexander floated the idea of establishing a rowing team soon after he assumed his role as president of the university. In Spring 1996 the plan to establish the rowing team was officially announced. The thought of a primarily ivy league sport at Murray State was met with skepticism among some groups. In fact the Murray State student newspaper printed a column mocking the plan, calling it "Alexander's Navy." The plan called for Murray State to practice as well as host home regattas on Kentucky Lake. Murray State was the first school in the State of Kentucky with a rowing program, established two years ahead of the University of Louisville.

In Fall 1996, Stephen Marchino was hired as head coach assisted by Dan Lavit. 172 students attended the first series of tryouts for the new rowing team, held at Roy Stewart Stadium. By Spring 1997 the team had been narrowed to a final group of 31 students. The first competition for the new rowing team was a duel race with Northwestern State University at the Natchitoches River.

In 1998 the women's program was elevated to NCAA status, while the men's team remained at the club level. The move to NCAA status for the women's team was done out of Title IX considerations; however, it brought increased funding, scholarships, and recognition to the Murray State rowing program. The program began hosting the annual Racer Regatta on Kentucky Lake beginning in 1999. Bill McLean was hired as head coach in 2003 after serving as the head coach at the University of Rochester for eight seasons. In the following years, McClean made great strides in turning the women's program into an award-winning NCAA rowing program. McClean hired the program's first full-time assistant coach in 2007. Robert Montague joined the program as a full-time assistant coach after serving three years as the head coach of the rowing club at the College of William and Mary.

In May 2008 Murray State announced that the rowing program would no longer be sponsored at the NCAA level. Athletic Director Allen Ward indicated that the move was necessary to increase female participation while managing costs. As a result, rowing was cut and replaced with women's softball and future plans to add equestrian as an NCAA sponsored sport. Ward noted, "It was important that we address the annual budget in a manner that does not jeopardize the opportunity for competitive success across the board. Our evaluation concluded that the sport of rowing does not ideally fit programmatically at the university, so we are choosing to replace it with sports that are more identifiable with the Murray State service region." Following the loss of university funding and sponsorship at the NCAA level in 2008, the men's and women's programs have continued on in competition as a club program.

=== Rugby ===
The Murray State Rugby Club was founded in 1996. The club competes as part of the MidSouth Rugby Football Union. In addition to intercollegiate matches, the club also sponsors an alumni match each year in which Murray State alumni face off against the student team in a best of three series.
