= Alaska Nanooks =

Intercollegiate athletics team of University of Alaska Fairbanks

- University: University of Alaska Fairbanks
- Nickname: Nanooks
- NCAA: Division II (primary); Division I (hockey only)
- Conference: GNAC (primary); Patriot Rifle Conference (rifle); RMISA (Nordic skiing); Independent (ice hockey)
- Athletic director: Dr. Brock Anundson
- Location: Fairbanks, Alaska
- Varsity teams: 10 (4 men's, 5 women's, 1 co-ed)
- Basketball arena: Alaska Airlines Gymnasium at the Patty Center
- Other venues: Carlson Center
- Colors: Blue and gold
- Mascot: Nook
- Website: alaskananooks.com
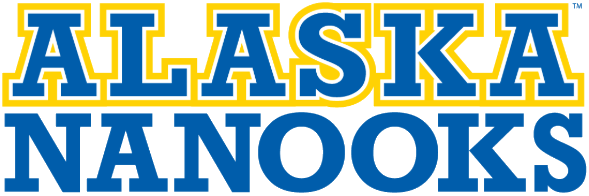

Team NCAA championships
- 11

Individual and relay NCAA champions
- 19

The Alaska Nanooks are the intercollegiate athletics teams that represent the University of Alaska Fairbanks. The Nanooks name is derived from the Inupiaq "nanuq", meaning polar bear. The school colors are blue and gold. The Nanooks compete at the NCAA Division II level for all sports except men's ice hockey (NCAA Division I). The majority of Nanooks sports are members of the Great Northwest Athletic Conference, the hockey team is an Independent (after spending several years in the Central Collegiate Hockey Association) and plays at the 4,595-seat Carlson Center located west of downtown Fairbanks, while the women's swim team is a member of the Pacific Collegiate Swimming and Diving Conference, the men's and women's skiing teams are members of the Rocky Mountain Intercollegiate Ski Association, and the rifle team competes as a member of the Patriot Rifle Conference.

== Sports sponsored ==
Men's sports	Women's sports
Basketball	Basketball
Cross country	Cross country
Ice hockey^{1}	Skiing
Skiing	Swimming
	Volleyball
Co-ed sports
Rifle
^{1} – competes in [[NCAA Division I|Division I]].

=== Ice hockey ===
Intercollegiate men's ice hockey began in the 1925–26 season. The team had competed as an independent team in Division I through the 1960s and Division II through the 1970s. The Nanooks returned to the Division I level in the 1985–86 season and joined the Great West Hockey Conference (GWHC). The team won the 1987–88 GWHC regular season and 1988 playoff championship. The team has also been a member of both the Central Collegiate Hockey Association from 1995 to until its dissolution in 2013, where the Nanooks appeared in their first ever NCAA Division I Men's Ice Hockey Tournament in 2010 before falling 3–1 to Boston College., as well as the Western Collegiate Hockey Association from 2013 until its dissolution in 2021. Currently, the team plays as an independent.

=== Rifle ===
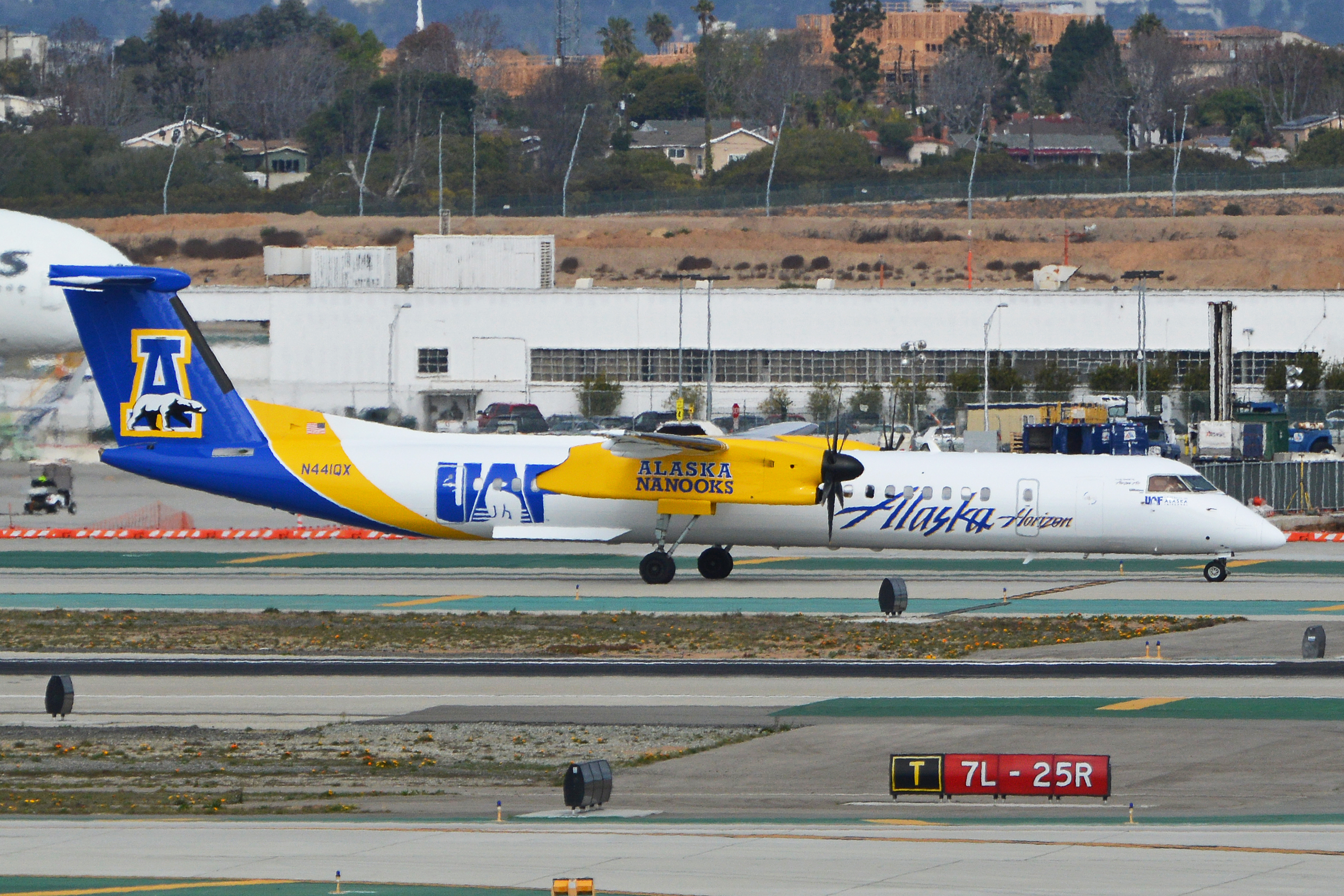
A Dash 8-Q400 of Horizon Air was painted to advertise the Alaska Nanooks. The aircraft is seen here at Los Angeles International Airport (February 2014)

The mixed rifle team has won eleven NCAA Rifle Championships (1994, 1999–2004, 2006–2008, 2023) and finished as runner-up seven times. In addition to the team championships, Nanook riflers have won individual NCAA championships in air rifle and smallbore rifle 17 times. In 2007 the university hosted the NCAA Rifle Championship, which saw the host Nanooks win their eighth title in nine years in front of a crowd of about 1,000. The Nanooks rifle team most recently won the 2023 National Championship, bettering its last runner-up finish to West Virginia University in 2015.

In June 2013, the Nanooks became a charter member of the Patriot Rifle Conference.

=== Skiing ===
The Nanooks were members of the Central Collegiate Ski Association from 1992 to 2016. They joined the Rocky Mountain Intercollegiate Ski Association in the 2016–17 season. Olympic cross-country skier Tyler Kornfield competed for the Nanooks in both Nordic skiing and cross-country running.
