= Army Black Knights =

College sports program of the United States Military Academy

- University: United States Military Academy
- Nickname: Black Knights
- NCAA: Division I (FBS)
- Conference: Patriot League (primary); The American (football); ECAC (men's gymnastics); AHA (men's ice hockey); GARC (rifle); NIRA (women's rugby); Rugby East (men's rugby); CSFL (sprint football); EIWA (wrestling); NCA (cheerleading)
- Athletic director: Tom Theodorakis
- Location: West Point, New York, U.S.
- Football stadium: Michie Stadium; Shea Stadium (Sprint football)
- Basketball arena: Christl Arena
- Ice hockey arena: Tate Rink
- Baseball stadium: Johnson Stadium at Doubleday Field
- Volleyball arena: Gillis Field House
- Colors: Black, gold, and gray
- Mascot: Mule
- Fight song: On, Brave Old Army Team
- Website: goarmywestpoint.com
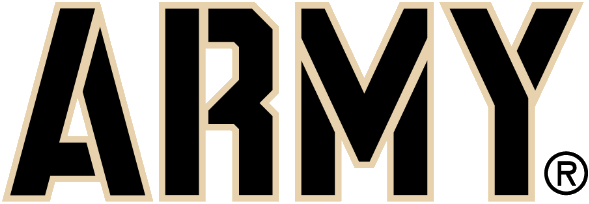

The Army Black Knights are the athletic teams that represent the United States Military Academy, located in West Point, New York.

The Black Knights compete at the National Collegiate Athletic Association (NCAA) Division I level as a non-football member of the Patriot League, a football-only member of the American Athletic Conference in the Football Bowl Subdivision (FBS), and a member of Atlantic Hockey America, the Collegiate Sprint Football League (men), the Eastern Intercollegiate Gymnastics League (men), the Eastern Intercollegiate Wrestling Association, the Great America Rifle Conference, the National Collegiate Boxing Association, the National Collegiate Paintball Association, and the National Intercollegiate Women's Fencing Association. Army is also one of approximately 300 members of the Eastern College Athletic Conference (ECAC).

Three of the service academies (Army, Air Force, and Navy) compete for the Commander-in-Chief's Trophy, which is awarded to the academy that defeats the others in football that year or is retained by the prior year's winner in the event of a three-way tie.

== History ==
Since 1899, Army's mascot has officially been a mule because of the animal's historical importance in military operations. For many years, Army's teams were known as the "Cadets". The academy's football team was nicknamed "The Black Knights of the Hudson" due to the black color of its uniforms. In 1999, Army adopted "Black Knights" as its official nickname in all sports. They may also use "Cadets" in certain circumstances.

U.S. sports media use Army as a synonym for the academy. In 2015, the academy adopted this usage formally, referring to its sports programs as Army West Point.

"On Brave Old Army Team", by Philip Egner, is the school's fight song. Army's chief sports rival is the Naval Academy, due to its long-standing football rivalry and the inter-service rivalry with the Navy in general. Fourth class cadets verbally greet upper-class cadets and faculty with "Beat Navy", while the tunnel that runs under Washington Road is named the "Beat Navy" tunnel. In the first half of the 20th century, Army and Notre Dame were football rivals, but that rivalry has largely died out and has only been intermittently played in recent decades.

== Athletic programs ==
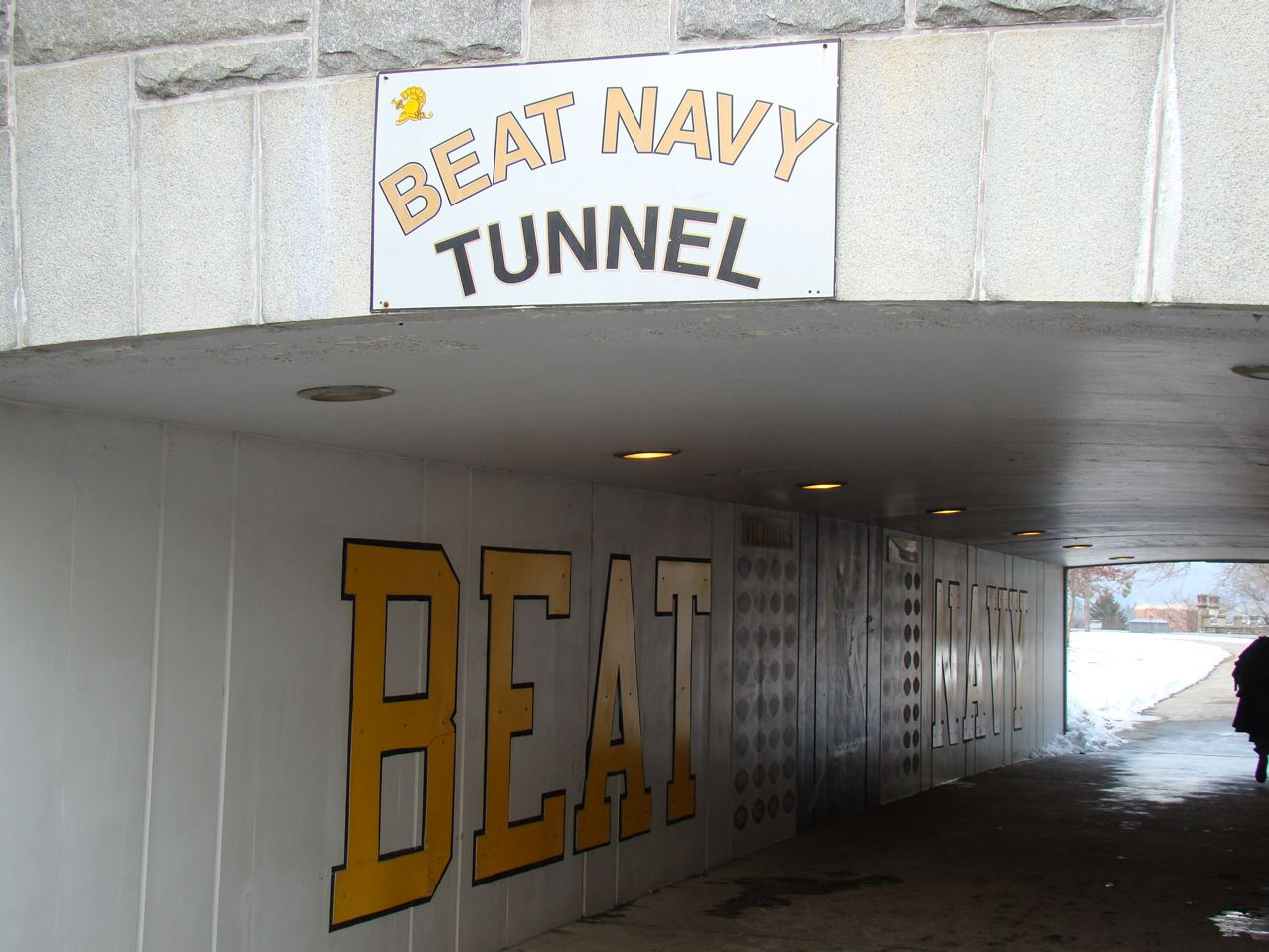
The "Beat Navy" tunnel at Michie Stadium on the U.S. Military Academy campus

| Men's sports | Women's sports |
|---|---|
| Baseball | Softball |
| Basketball | Basketball |
| Cross country | Cross country |
| Soccer | Soccer |
| Lacrosse | Lacrosse |
| Swimming and diving | Swimming and diving |
| Tennis | Tennis |
| Track and field^{†} | Track and field^{†} |
| Rugby | Rugby |
| Football | Volleyball |
| Sprint football | |
| Golf | |
| Gymnastics | |
| Ice hockey | |
| Wrestling | |
Co-ed sport
Rabble Rousers (Cheerleading and Dance)
Rifle
† – Track and field includes both indoor and outdoor

=== Football ===
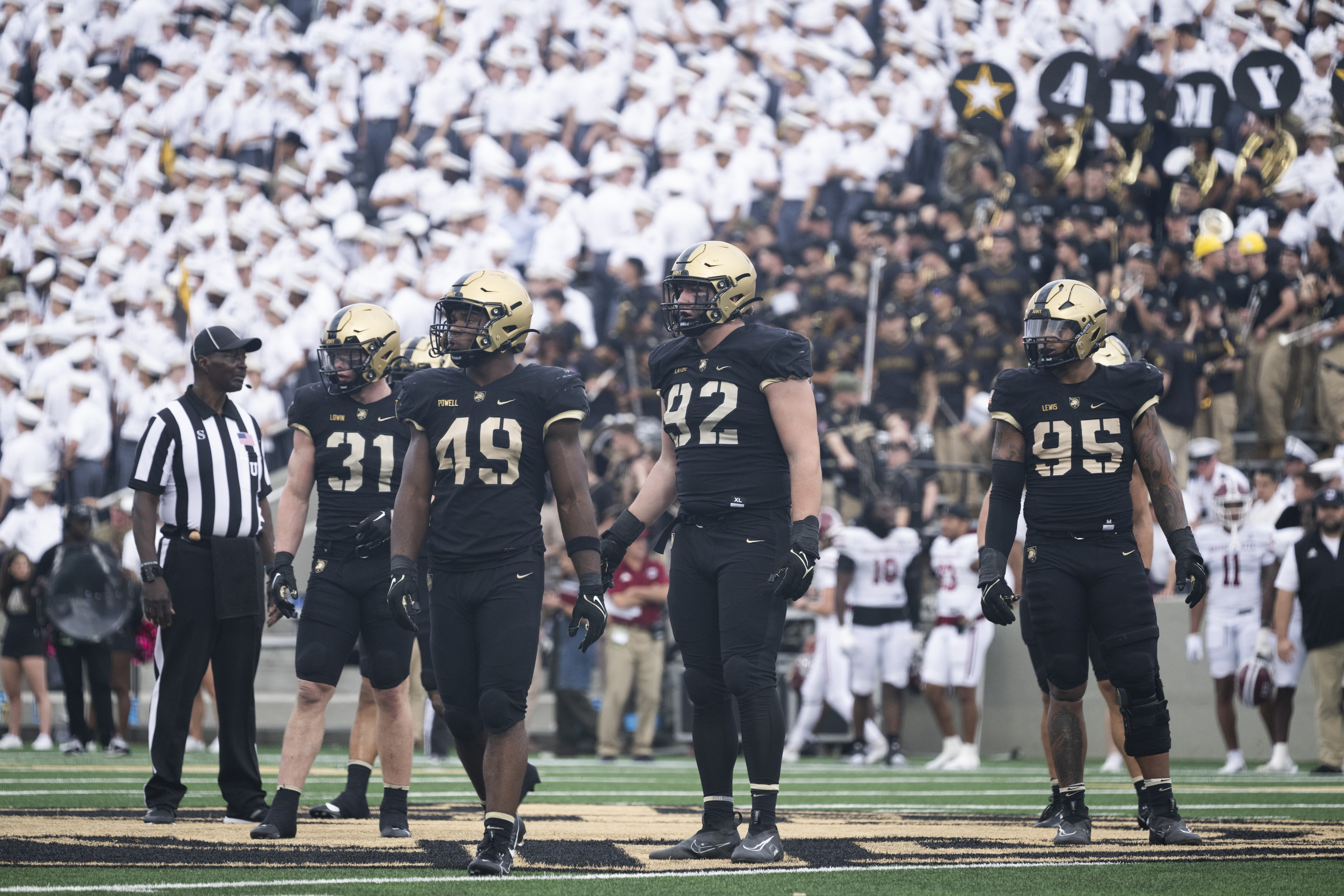
Army football players during a game at Michie Stadium in 2023

Since the 2024 season, Army has been a football-only member of the American Athletic Conference (The American). For almost all of Army's previous football history, with the exception of a relatively short stint as a football-only member of Conference USA, it had been an NCAA Division I Football Bowl Subdivision independent school (not in a conference), and before joining The American was one of only four remaining FBS independents. Army was recognized as the national champions in 1944, 1945 and 1946. The annual Army–Navy Game between the Black Knights of Army and the Midshipmen of the Naval Academy at Annapolis (Navy) is among the most storied rivalries in all of college sports and currently marks the end of regular season play for college football each year. Although the two academies' football programs are now united in The American, their rivalry game continues as a non-conference game on its traditional date.

=== Men's golf ===
The men's golf team has won 21 conference championships:

- Metro Atlantic Athletic Conference (9): 1982–88, 1989 (spring), 1989 (fall)
- Patriot League (11): 1991–93, 1994 (spring), 1994 (fall), 1995, 2002, 2004–05, 2011, 2016, 2019

=== Men's ice hockey ===
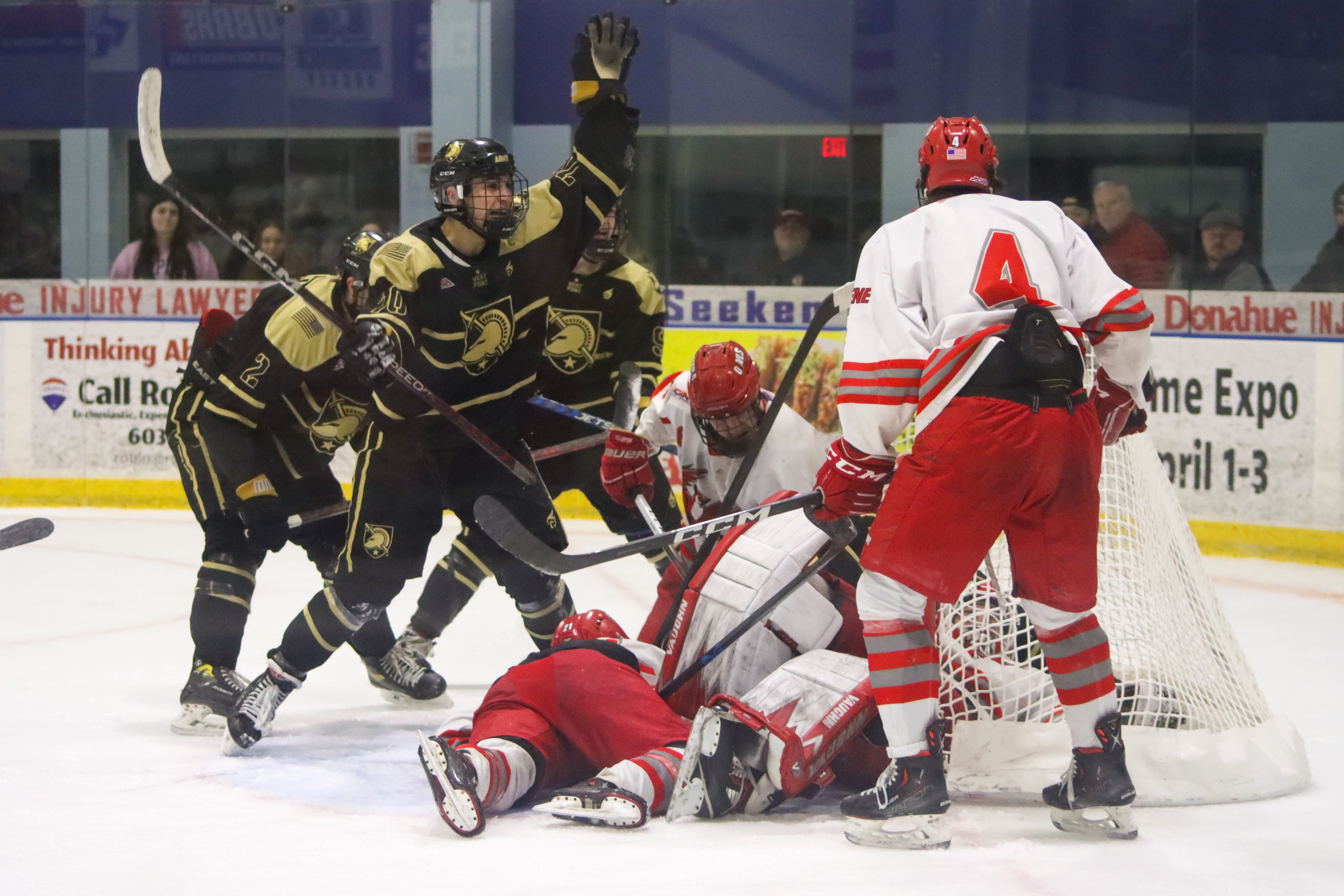
The Army club hockey team celebrates a goal during an ACHA game against Keene State in 2024

Every year, Army faces the Royal Military College of Canada (RMC) Paladins in the annual West Point Weekend hockey game. This series, conceived in 1923, is the longest-running annual international sporting event in the world.

=== Men's rugby ===
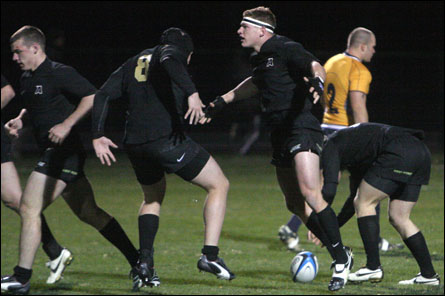
The Army Rugby Football Club

Army rugby plays college rugby in the Division 1–A Eastern Conference. The Black Knights play their home games at the Anderson Rugby Complex on the campus of West Point. Rugby is a relatively popular sport at Army; for example, the 2012 game against Air Force was attended by 2,000 fans. Army is led by Director of Rugby Matt Sherman.

Army has one of the most successful college rugby teams in the country. Army played in three consecutive national championship games from 1990 to 1992 and reached the national semi-finals four consecutive years from 2000 to 2003, twice in a row in 2009 and 2010. More recently, Army reached the quarterfinals in 2013. Army also plays in the Collegiate Rugby Championship for rugby sevens, the highest profile college rugby tournament in the U.S., reaching the finals in 2011. The Collegiate Rugby Championship had been played every year in early June near Philadelphia and was broadcast live on NBC. It has been played in New Orleans since 2021.

=== Men's soccer ===
Army won the Division 1-A rugby national championship in XVs in 2022, defeating St. Mary's of California, 20-8. The team defeated three perennial powerhouses in a row by earlier defeating both Life University and Lindenwood University in the tournament.

=== Wrestling ===
The Army Black Knights Wrestling team host home dual meets, tournaments, workout, and practice in the state of the art facility Arvin Gymnasium on campus. The team currently competes in the Eastern Intercollegiate Wrestling Association (EIWA) since Army is a member of the non-wrestling Patriot League.

In 2014, Kevin Ward, a former Oklahoma State All-American, was named the new head coach of Army wrestling. In 2010, Ward started the Ouachita Baptist University wrestling program, the first NCAA wrestling program in Arkansas.

=== Non-varsity sports ===
==== Boxing ====
In intercollegiate competition, both the men's and women's boxing teams compete in the National Collegiate Boxing Association, though the women's team was part of the United States Intercollegiate Boxing Association from 2013 until 2015. The men's team won the national NCBA tournament from 2008 to 2011, from 2013 to 2014, and from 2016 to 2019; the women's team won the first-ever USIBA women's championship in 2013 (also the very first national collegiate women's boxing tournament in the U.S.), won again in 2014, and won the NCBA championship in 2017 and 2018.

==== Handball ====
The Army handball team is the most successful college handball team. They have at least 37 men and 23 women National Championship titles.

== Awards ==
- Lt. Raymond Enners Award (national men's lacrosse award; named for a member of the Class of 1967)
- Maggie Dixon Award (national women's basketball rookie coach award; named for Army women's basketball coach)
- NCAA Award of Valor:
  - 2007 — Derek Hines (Class of 2003), who demonstrated valor in Afghanistan before being killed there.
  - 2008 — Emily Perez (Class of 2005), who died after an improvised explosive device exploded near her vehicle in Iraq and whose U.S. Army unit recognized her for her leadership after her death.
- NCAA Theodore Roosevelt Award:
  - 1967 — Dwight D. Eisenhower (football)
  - 1973 — Omar Bradley (baseball)

== Hall of Fame ==
For a list of members by name, sport, class year, or induction year, see footnote The Army Sports Hall of Fame consists of displays in the Kenna Hall of Army Sports, which is located within the Kimsey Athletic Center. The first set of members was inducted in 2004.

== See also ==
- Military World Games
- List of college athletic programs in New York#Division I
- United States Military Academy grounds and facilities#Athletic facilities
- List of sportspeople educated at the United States Military Academy
