= Alejandro Villanueva (American football) =

American football player (born 1988)

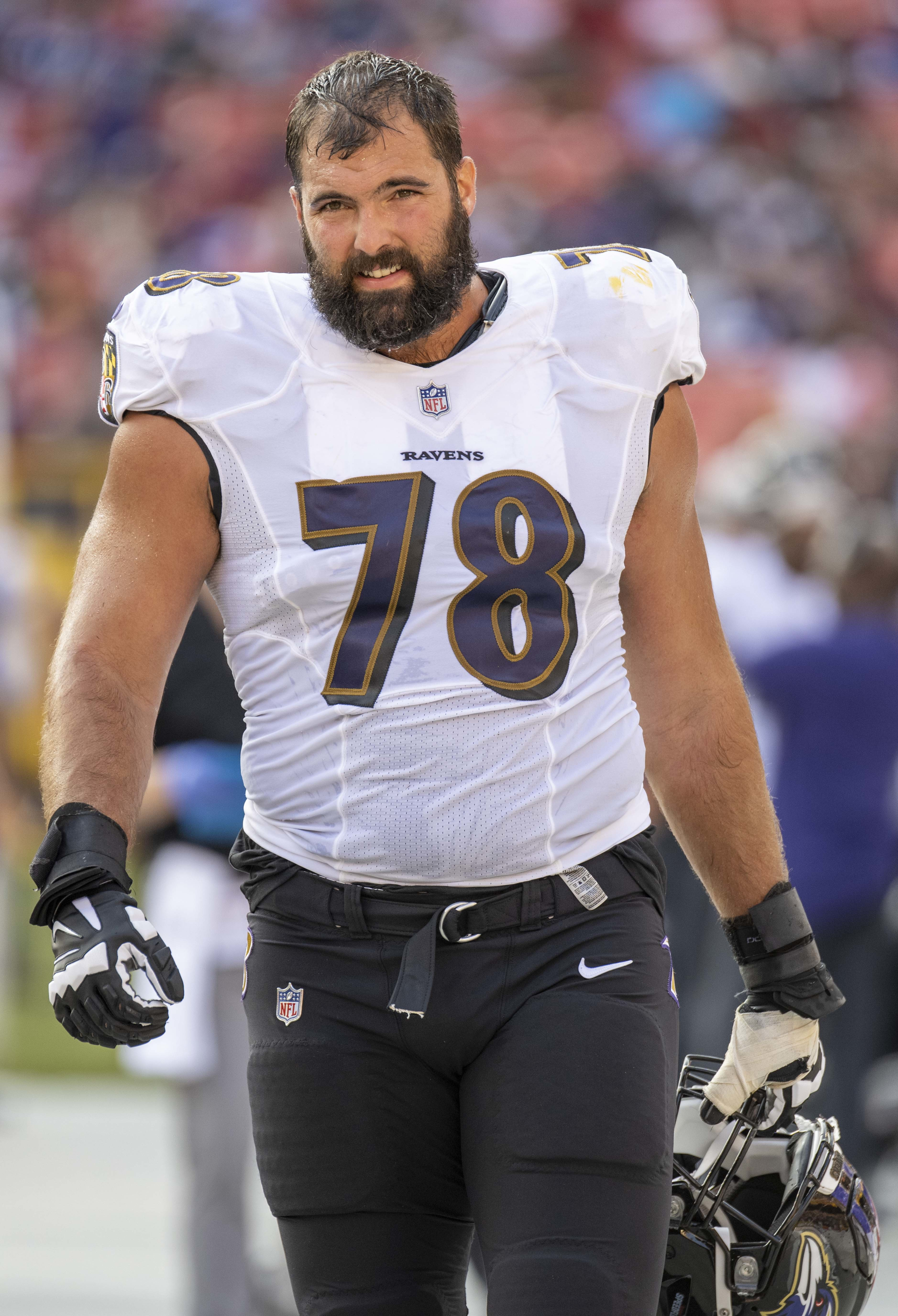
- Villanueva with the Baltimore Ravens in 2021

No. 78
- Position: Offensive tackle

Personal information
- Born: September 22, 1988 (age 38); Meridian, Mississippi, U.S.
- Listed height: 6 ft 9 in (2.06 m)
- Listed weight: 320 lb (145 kg)

Career information
- High school: SHAPE (Casteau, Belgium)
- College: Army
- NFL draft: 2010: undrafted

Career history
- Philadelphia Eagles (2014)*; Pittsburgh Steelers (2014–2020); Baltimore Ravens (2021)
- * Offseason or practice squad member only

Awards and highlights
- 2× Pro Bowl (2017, 2018)

Career NFL statistics
- Games played: 113
- Games started: 107
- Total tackles: 4
- Receptions: 1
- Receiving yards: 2
- Receiving touchdowns: 1
- Fumble recoveries: 3
- Stats at Pro Football Reference

Alejandro Villanueva Martín (born September 22, 1988) is a Spanish-American former professional football player who was an offensive tackle for eight seasons in the National Football League (NFL). He played college football for the Army Black Knights and fulfilled his service commitment after graduation, where he reached the rank of captain. Villanueva also served in the 75th Ranger Regiment, earning a Bronze Star. After serving three tours of duty in Afghanistan, he signed a contract with the Philadelphia Eagles in 2014, but was waived prior to the season. He then signed with the Pittsburgh Steelers and played for them for six seasons until signing with the Baltimore Ravens in 2021 for his final season.

== Early life ==
Villanueva was born on Naval Air Station Meridian in Meridian, Mississippi, to Ignacio Villanueva, a Spanish Naval officer who worked for NATO, and his Spanish wife Matilde Martín. Both his mother and father are over 6 feet (1.83 m) tall. Alejandro is the eldest of the family's four children, including siblings Carmen, Iñaki and Paloma.

During his childhood, he lived in Rhode Island, Spain, and Belgium. In Spain he learned to play rugby, which, for a time, he preferred to football. Later when his family moved to Belgium he continued to play rugby at SHAPE High School. One of his friends from SHAPE was later recruited to play football for the Army Black Knights, and raved about Villanueva to the Army coaches, putting him on their radar. They kept in touch and Villanueva told him that he was considering attending West Point, a school to which he later attended.

His brother Iñaki Villanueva is a professional rugby union player. He plays with the Spain national rugby union team and with the sevens team. He was in the squad that qualified for the 2016 Olympics, and he played in the Olympic tournament.

== College career ==
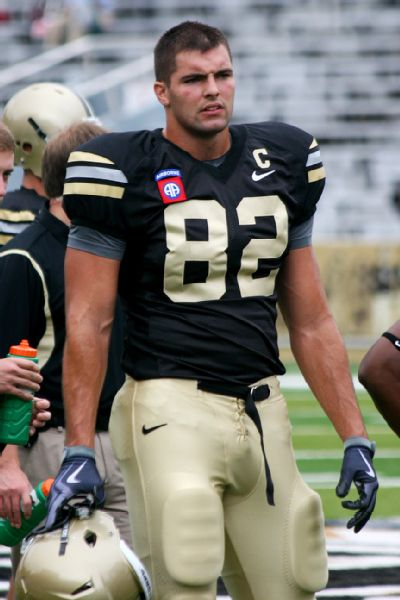
Villanueva during his first class year with Army

Villanueva played college football for the Army Black Knights at several positions, including left tackle, defensive lineman, and wide receiver. Though originally recruited as a tight end, he played defensive end during his freshman season, mostly on special teams. In his sophomore season offensive line coach John Tice lobbied to have Villanueva converted to an offensive tackle which occurred near the end of his sophomore year. By his junior season he started every game at left tackle. Voted a team captain before his senior year, he reluctantly converted once more to become a 290 pounds (130 kg) wide receiver; a feature story in the Army football program read, "Already touted as the tallest football player in the country, Villanueva completed the transformation from being an offensive lineman for the past two years, to running routes on the field with the starting offense last Saturday night." His height, while reported by Army Football in 2009 to be 6 feet 10 inches (2.08 m), was given by the Philadelphia Eagles in 2014 as 6 feet 9 inches (2.06 m).

== Professional career ==
Pre-draft measurables
Height	Weight
6 ft 9 in (2.06 m)	277 lb (126 kg)
All values from Pro Day

=== Tryouts ===
Although he went undrafted in the 2010 NFL draft, he received a tryout with the Cincinnati Bengals as a tight end, but did not make the team and went back into military service. Two years later, he made a second attempt to play in the NFL as a tight end. He was given a tryout and practiced with the Chicago Bears, but was not signed. After finishing his last tour with the 75th Ranger Regiment, Villanueva decided to pursue his NFL career again and began working out at Savannah State University. In March 2014, he paid $245 to attend a regional NFL combine in Flowery Branch, Georgia. During this time, the NFL held 10 regional combines nationwide and had over 3,000 prospects attend. In April 2014, he was one of 240 prospects invited to the NFL super regional combine in Detroit and met with representatives from the Philadelphia Eagles.

=== Philadelphia Eagles ===
On May 5, 2014, he was signed to the Philadelphia Eagles for an undisclosed contract to play as a defensive end. His signing marked the second time the Eagles had signed a military veteran in recent years, having previously had Chad Hall, a wide receiver from the Air Force, as a member of the team. Villanueva said that if he did not make an NFL roster, he planned to serve a fourth tour of duty in Afghanistan. He commented, "I see this as a win-win situation. Obviously, I'm trying to get to a team and contribute. But if I can't, then I can't wait to get back to the Army and serve in the same manner that I have." During training camp, Villanueva gained 40 pounds (18 kg), noting that he is eating a consistent diet, which contrasted with his military career insofar as while in the military, he often did not have time or inclination to eat, whereas with the Eagles, he was getting "plenty to eat". It was announced on August 23 that he was one of 14 players cut from the team.

=== Pittsburgh Steelers ===
On August 21, 2014, during a pre-season game against the Pittsburgh Steelers, Villanueva was spotted by Steelers' head coach Mike Tomlin, who was impressed with his size and athleticism. Eight days after he was waived by the Philadelphia Eagles, the Pittsburgh Steelers signed him to their practice squad on August 31, 2014. Upon joining his new team, he was immediately changed from a defensive end to an offensive tackle, as it was thought to better suit him. As a defensive end for the Eagles, Villanueva weighed 250 lb. Within a year of becoming an offensive tackle, he rose up to 340 lb. Throughout the 2014 season, Villanueva was kept on the practice squad to learn the position, put on more weight, and develop his abilities.

==== 2015 ====
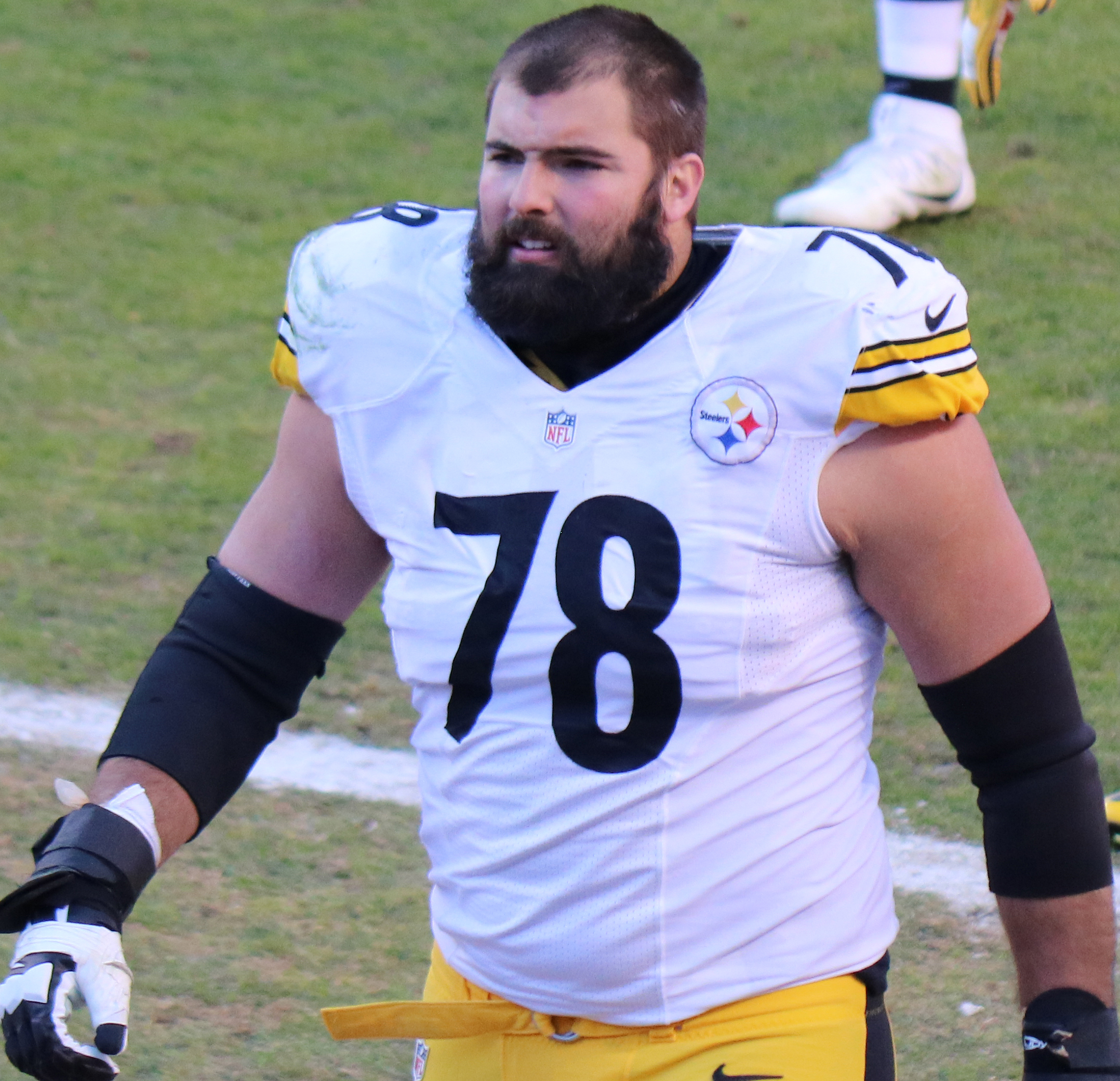
Villanueva with the Steelers in 2015

On January 6, 2015, the Pittsburgh Steelers signed him to a two-year, $960,000 reserve/futures contract. He was able to get reps in training camp and preseason as the second-team swing tackle, after Mike Adams suffered an injury. With Adams unable to recover before the regular season, Villanueva was slated as the Steelers' swing tackle to begin the 2015 season. He made his debut during the 2015 season opener against the New England Patriots, playing five snaps as an extra tackle on goal-line plays. He also appeared on special teams and played a few plays at tight end during this period.

On October 18, 2015, Villanueva received his first opportunity at left tackle against the Arizona Cardinals after starting left tackle Kelvin Beachum left the game with a torn ACL.

The following week, Villanueva received his first career start at offensive tackle since his sophomore year at Army in 2008 and was tasked with blocking Kansas City Chiefs Pro-Bowl defensive end, Tamba Hali. He allowed a strip sack in the fourth quarter, which aided the Chiefs in defeating the Steelers. With Beachum out for the remainder of the season, Villanueva continued to play left tackle and started the last 12 games of the Steelers' season, including two playoffs games. In his first season as a starter, he was ranked the 48th best offensive tackle by Pro Football Focus with an overall grade of 47.5. He surrendered 39 pressures on 459 pass blocking snaps and ranked as the 11th-worst offensive tackle in pass blocking efficiency with a grade of 93.2 by PFF.

==== 2016 ====
Villanueva was named the starting left tackle position to begin the 2016 season after Kelvin Beachum left via free agency and after outperforming Ryan Harris in training camp. Villanueva struggled early on in the season and surrendered five sacks in the first six games of the season. His run blocking and pass protection greatly improved after Week 7 and he only allowed one sack in the last ten games, helping the Pittsburgh Steelers reach the playoffs. He finished the season ranking as the 23rd best offensive tackle in the league after receiving an 82.4 overall grade from Pro Football Focus. Including the three playoff games, Villanueva allowed 46 pressures and was penalized eight times in 19 starts with 26 of those pressures and five penalties coming in the first six regular season games. From Week 11 to the AFC Championship, he performed well enough to rank as the best offensive tackle in that span.

==== 2017 ====
On July 27, 2017, Villanueva signed a four-year, $24 million contract extension with the Steelers. Villanueva was credited with creating an audible that included the phrase "Dilly Dilly" from a Bud Light television commercial, that quarterback Ben Roethlisberger later used in a live game. On December 19, 2017, Villanueva was named to his first Pro Bowl along with fellow Steeler offensive linemen David DeCastro and Maurkice Pouncey. He became the first service academy graduate to play in the Pro Bowl since Roger Staubach in 1979. Villanueva started all 16 games in 2017 received an overall grade of 74.3 from Pro Football Focus. His grade ranked him 24th among all offensive tackles in the NFL.

===== National anthem controversy =====
On September 24, 2017, prior to a game against the Chicago Bears at Soldier Field, the Steelers did not take the field for the national anthem in order to avoid getting caught up in the controversy related to players kneeling or displaying other signs of racial protest around the NFL started by Colin Kaepernick.

Villanueva was the lone member of the Steelers to appear publicly for the national anthem, standing in front of the entrance tunnel for the performance while the rest of the team remained in the tunnel. Head coach Mike Tomlin stated a wish to simply play the game and not allow for any show of support one way or the other on the issue. Likely as a result of this, Villanueva's jersey became the top selling jersey on the NFL's official store in the 24-hour period after Sunday's games started. The move caught some of his teammates and coach Tomlin by surprise. Later, Villanueva apologized for his appearance saying, "I see that picture of me standing by myself and I'm embarrassed to a degree, because unintentionally I left my teammates behind." At a press conference the day after, he said, "Unfortunately, I threw my teammates under the bus, unintentionally...Every single time I see that picture of me, standing by myself, I feel embarrassed."

In additional comments, he said, "It wasn't me stepping forward. I never planned to boycott the plan that the Steelers came up with. I just thought there would be some middle ground where I could stand in the tunnel, nobody would see me."

==== 2018 ====
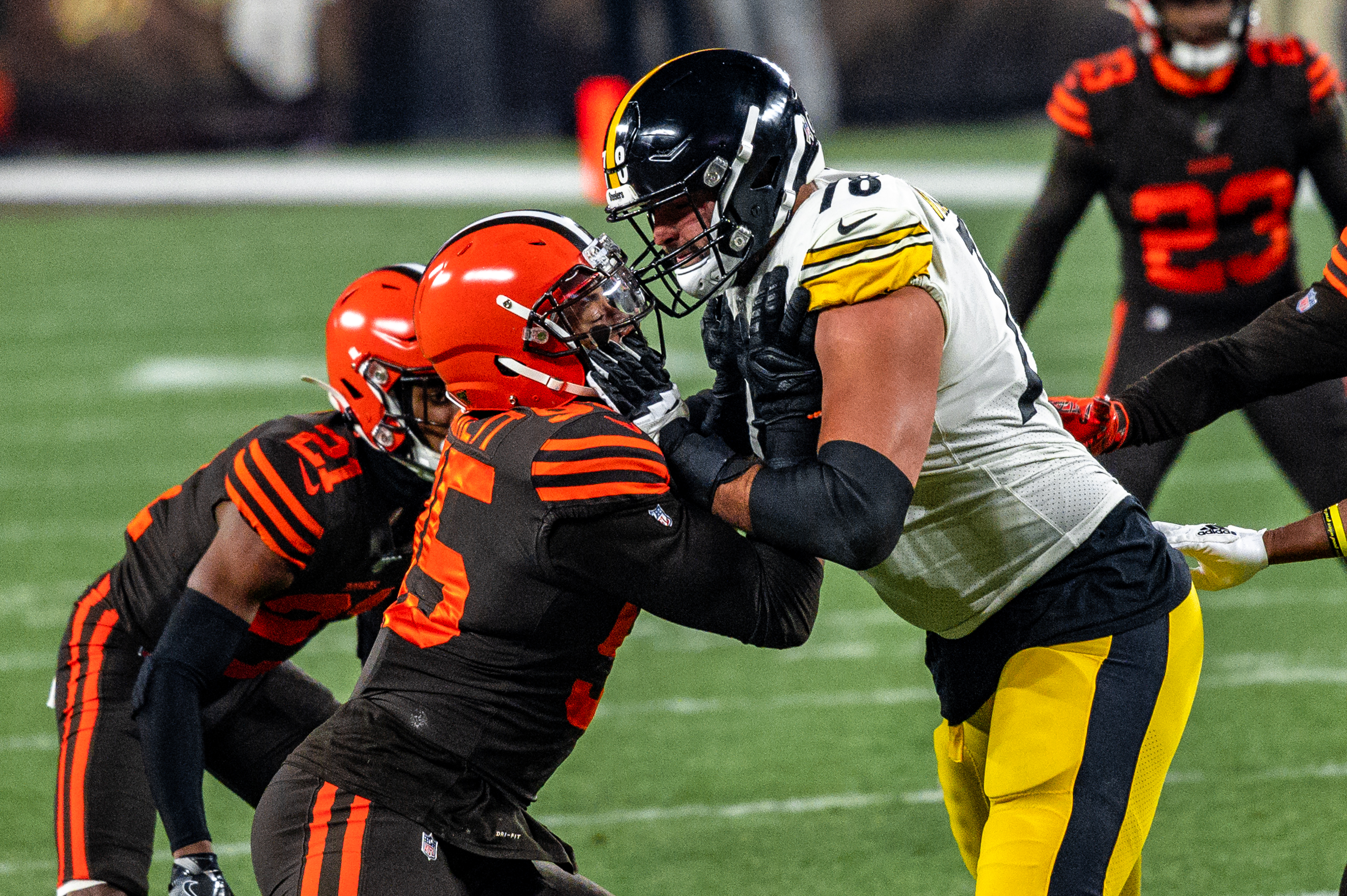
Villanueva in a game against the Cleveland Browns in 2019

On November 25, 2018, Villanueva caught his first career touchdown pass on a fake field goal from Chris Boswell at the end of the first half in a game against the Denver Broncos. He received an overall grade of 78.1 from Pro Football Focus in 2018, which ranked as the 12th highest grade among all qualifying offensive tackles.

==== 2020 ====
On September 28, 2020, Villanueva taped Sergeant First Class Alwyn Cashe's name on the back of his helmet, covering the name of Antwon Rose Jr, who was killed by an East Pittsburgh police officer in June 2018 after being involved in a drive-by shooting. Cashe was a US Army non-commissioned officer posthumously awarded the Silver Star ( Later upgraded to the Congressional Medal Of Honor) in 2005 for actions he took in Operation Iraqi Freedom to rescue soldiers from a burning vehicle, during which time he sustained burns over 75% of his body and ultimately succumbed to his injuries. The Steelers team had previously decided to honor Rose. Villanueva stated his actions were intended to support the campaign to upgrade Cashe's award for valor from the Silver Star to the Medal of Honor.

=== Baltimore Ravens ===
On May 4, 2021, Villanueva signed a two-year, $14 million contract with the Baltimore Ravens.

=== Retirement ===
On March 9, 2022, Villanueva announced his retirement from the NFL.

=== NFL career statistics ===
Year	Team	Games	Starts
2015	PIT	16	10
2016	PIT	16	16
2017	PIT	16	16
2018	PIT	16	16
2019	PIT	16	16
2020	PIT	16	16
2021	BAL	17	17
Career		113	107

== Military career ==
Alejandro Villanueva
- Military career
- Allegiance: United States
- Branch: United States Army
- Service years: 2010–2015
- Rank: Captain
- Units: 1st Battalion, 75th Ranger Regiment; 2nd Battalion, 87th Infantry Regiment, 10th Mountain Division
- Conflicts: War in Afghanistan
- Awards: Bronze Star Medal with "V" device (2)

After graduating from the United States Military Academy, Villanueva was commissioned into the United States Army on May 22, 2010, as a second lieutenant in the Infantry. Directly after being commissioned he attended various military schools, including the Infantry, Airborne, and Ranger Schools; all located at Fort Benning, Georgia. After completing the three courses, he was assigned to the 10th Mountain Division at Fort Drum, New York. It was with the 10th Mountain Division he deployed for the first time for 12 months to Afghanistan in support of Operation Enduring Freedom - Afghanistan as a rifle platoon leader. As a result of his actions during this deployment he was awarded a Bronze Star Medal with "V" device for rescuing wounded soldiers while under enemy fire. When he returned from his deployment, he was reassigned as a company executive officer.

Villanueva volunteered for the 75th Ranger Regiment's Ranger Orientation Program in 2013. He was assigned to the 1st Ranger Battalion. His roles within the Battalion have included plans officer, platoon leader, and company executive officer.

He has deployed two more times to Afghanistan for a total of eight months between both deployments. In 2015, Villanueva left the army when downsizing efforts meant he would have to wait 18 months for a command position that would last less than 12 months.

=== Commendations ===
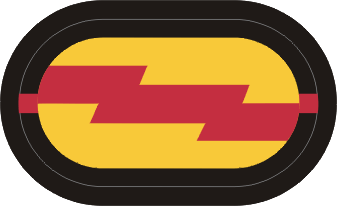
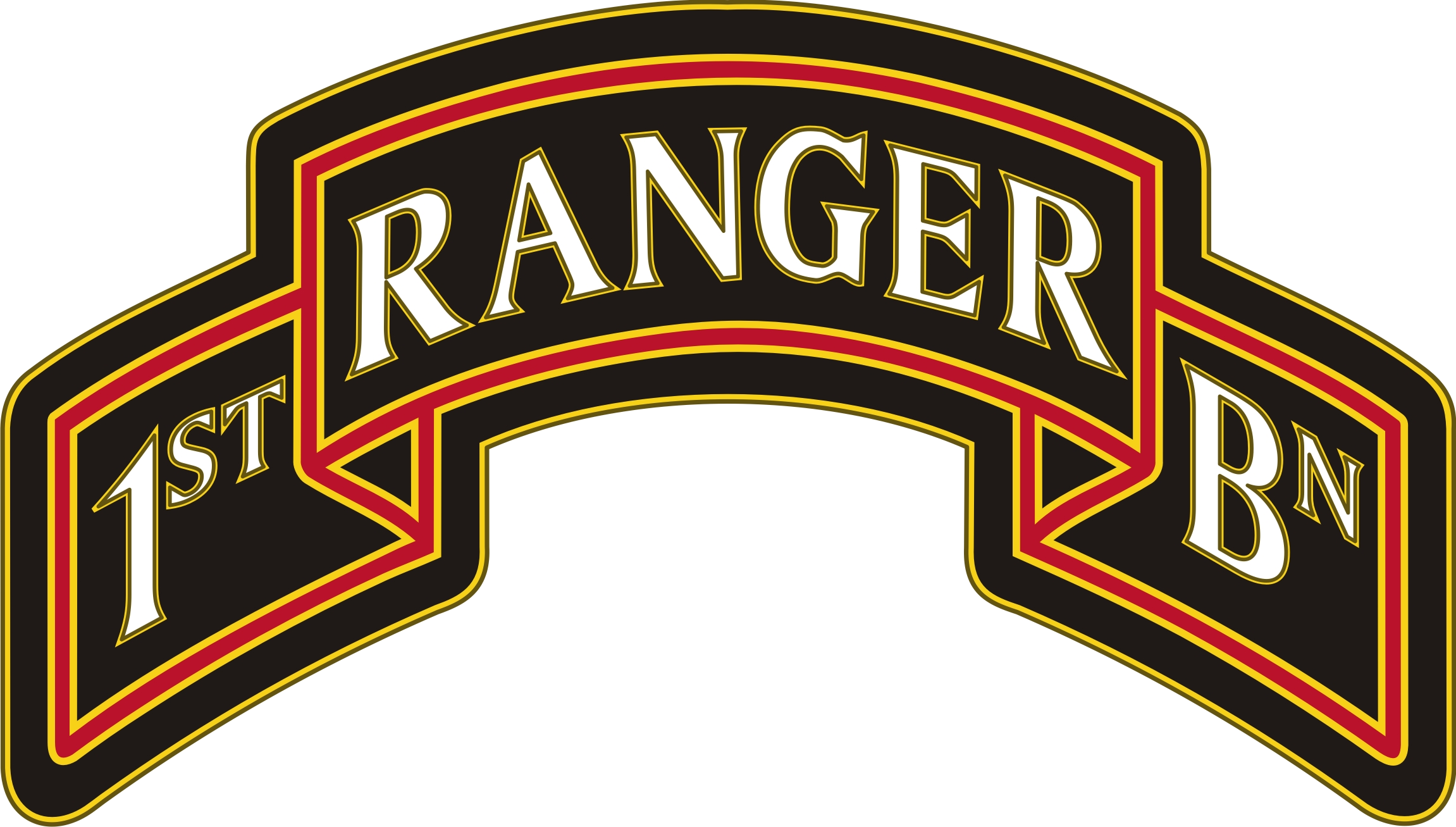

Badge	Combat Infantryman Badge		
1st row	Bronze Star Medal with "V" device and 1 bronze oak leaf cluster		
2nd row	National Defense Service Medal	Afghanistan Campaign Medal with 1 bronze Campaign star	Global War on Terrorism Service Medal
3rd row	Army Service Ribbon	Army Overseas Service Ribbon	NATO Medal for service with ISAF
Badges	Parachutist Badge with 1st Ranger Battalion background trimming	Ranger tab	1st Ranger Battalion Combat Service Identification Badge

== Personal life ==
Villanueva has spoken publicly about the importance of his Catholic faith in his life and work. In November 2013, he married Madelyn Muldoon in a small ceremony in her parents' backyard. He met her through her brother, Joe Muldoon, with whom he played football at Army, and the two began dating in the spring of 2012. On May 9, 2015, Alejandro and Madelyn had a larger ceremony at the Jesus the Divine Word Catholic Church in Huntingtown, Maryland.

In the fall of 2015, Villanueva enrolled in Carnegie Mellon University's Tepper School of Business to earn a Master of Business Administration (MBA) degree. After studying part-time for four years, one more than is typical for a student in Tepper's MBA program, Villanueva received his degree in 2019.

During the 2017 season, Villanueva taught JuJu Smith-Schuster, his 20-year-old teammate, how to drive using Villanueva's own Ford F-150 Limited.

=== Endorsements ===
Villanueva began a partnership with USAA in 2016 and appeared in one of the company's member's voices commercials. His wife and son also appear in it.

== See also ==
- List of sportspeople educated at the United States Military Academy
