= Andrew Rodriguez =

Andrew Rodriguez may refer to:

- Andrew Rodriguez (singer-songwriter) (born 1971), Canadian singer-songwriter
- Andrew Rodriguez (American football) (born 1990), American football player
