= Army Black Knights football =

American athletic football program of the U. S. Military Academy

2026 Army Black Knights football team
- First season: 1890; 136 years ago
- Athletic director: Tom Theodorakis
- Head coach: Jeff Monken; 12th season, 89–63 (.586)
- Location: West Point, New York
- Stadium: Michie Stadium (capacity: 36,000)
- NCAA division: Division I FBS
- Conference: American
- Colors: Black, gold, and gray
- All-time record: 746–553–51 (.571)
- Bowl record: 9–3 (.750)

National championships
- Claimed: 1914, 1916, 1944, 1945, 1946

Conference championships
- American: 2024
- Heisman winners: Doc Blanchard – 1945; Glenn Davis – 1946; Pete Dawkins – 1958
- Consensus All-Americans: 37
- Rivalries: Air Force (CiCT); Navy (rivalry, CiCT); Notre Dame (rivalry)

Uniforms
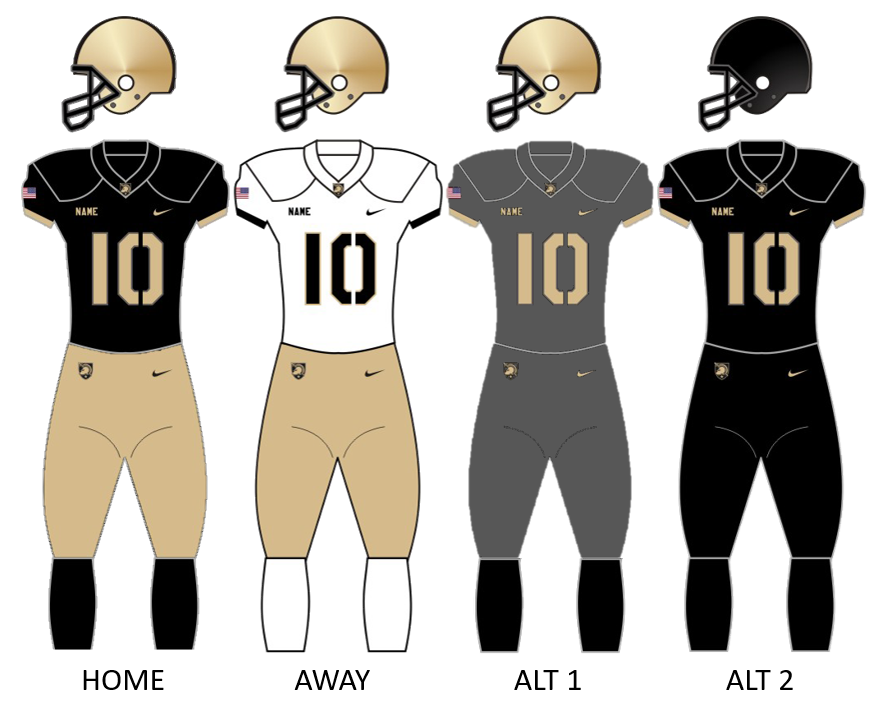
- Fight song: On, Brave Old Army Team
- Mascot: Army Mules
- Marching band: United States Military Academy Band
- Outfitter: Nike
- Website: GoArmyWestPoint.com

The Army Black Knights football team, historically known as the Army Cadets, represents the United States Military Academy in college football. The Black Knights team competes in the Football Bowl Subdivision (FBS) of the National Collegiate Athletic Association (NCAA) as a member of the American Conference. The Black Knights play home games in Michie Stadium with a capacity of 36,000 on the academy grounds in West Point, New York. The Black Knights are coached by Jeff Monken, who has held the position since 2014.

Army claims five national championships, including two AP Trophies in 1944 and 1945. Army has produced 24 players and four coaches in the College Football Hall of Fame, 37 consensus All-Americans, and three Heisman Trophy winners: Doc Blanchard (1945), Glenn Davis (1946), and Pete Dawkins (1958).

With the exception of seven seasons (1998–2004) when the team was a member of Conference USA, Army competed as an independent, meaning that they had no affiliation with any conference. They started to compete in the American Athletic Conference, now known as the American Conference, as a football-only member in 2024. For all other sports Army is primarily a member of the Patriot League.

Army competes with their historic rivals Navy in the Army–Navy Game, traditionally the final game of the college football regular season. The three major service academies—Army, Navy, and Air Force—compete for the Commander-in-Chief's Trophy; Army has won the award ten times, most recently in 2023.

== History ==
Army's football program began on November 29, 1890, when Navy challenged the cadets to a game of the relatively new sport. Navy defeated Army at West Point that year, but Army avenged the loss in Annapolis the following year. The academies still clash every December in what is traditionally the last regular-season Division I college-football game.

Army's football team reached its pinnacle of success during the Second World War under coach Earl Blaik when Army won three consecutive national championships in 1944, 1945 and 1946, and produced two Heisman Trophy winners: Doc Blanchard (1945), Glenn Davis (1946). From 1944 to 1950, the Cadets had 57 wins, 3 losses and 4 ties. During this time span, Army won three national championships. Army produced a third Heisman trophy winner in 1958 when Pete Dawkins took the honors.

Past NFL coaches Vince Lombardi and Bill Parcells were Army assistant coaches early in their careers.

The football team plays its home games at Michie Stadium, where the playing field is named after Earl Blaik. Cadets' attendance is mandatory at football games and the Corps stands for the duration of the game. At all home games, one of the four regiments marches onto the field in formation before the team takes the field and leads the crowd in traditional Army cheers. Two of the regiments are tasked with performing the morning parade while the last regiment is tasked with ancillary stadium duties.

For many years, Army teams were known as the "Cadets." In the 1940s, several papers called the football team "the Black Knights of the Hudson." From then on, "Cadets" and "Black Knights" were used interchangeably until 1999, when the team was officially nicknamed the Black Knights. Individual cadets as well as groups of cadets to include the entire team are still often referred to as "Cadet" or "The Cadets" with regard to athletic events.

Between the 1998 and 2004 seasons, Army's football program was a member of Conference USA, but starting with the 2005 season Army reverted to its former independent status. Army competes with Navy and Air Force for the Commander-in-Chief's Trophy. In 2024, Army began competing in the American Athletic Conference, renamed in 2025 to American Conference. While Air Force plays in the Mountain West Conference, Navy has been a football member of the American since 2015. The regular season matchup between Army and Navy is contested as a non-conference matchup after the conference championship game and therefore does not affect conference standings.

== Championships ==
=== National championships ===
Army has won five national championships from NCAA-designated major selectors, including twice (1944, 1945) from the AP Poll.

Year	Coach	Selectors	Record	Final AP	Final Coaches
1914	Charles Daly	Helms, Parke Davis (co), Houlgate, National Championship Foundation	9–0	–	–
1916	Charles Daly	Parke Davis (co)	9–0	–	–
1944	Earl Blaik	AP, Berryman, Billingsley MOV, Boand, DeVold, Dunkel, Football Research, Helms, Houlgate, Litkenhous, National Championship Foundation (co), Poling, Sagarin (co), Williamson	9–0	No. 1	–
1945	Earl Blaik	AP, Berryman, Billingsley, Boand, DeVold, Dunkel, Football Research, Helms, Houlgate, Litkenhous, National Championship Foundation (co), Poling, Sagarin, Sagarin (ELOChess), Williamson	9–0	No. 1	–
1946	Earl Blaik	Billingsley, Boand (co), Football Research, Helms (co), Houlgate, Poling (co)	9–0–1	No. 2	–

=== Conference championships ===
Season	Conference	Coach	Conference record	Overall record
2024	American Athletic Conference	Jeff Monken	8–0	11–2

== Lambert Trophy ==
The Lambert-Meadowlands Trophy (known as the Lambert Trophy), established in 1936, is an annual award given to the best team in the East in Division I FBS (formerly I-A) college football and is presented by the Metropolitan New York Football Writers. Army has won the Lambert Trophy nine times; seven times under head coach Earl "Red" Blaik in the 1940s and 1950s, and twice under head coach Jeff Monken in 2018 and 2020.

Year	Coach	Record	Final AP rank
1944	Earl Blaik	9–0	#1
1945	Earl Blaik	9–0	#1
1946	Earl Blaik	9–0–1	#2
1948	Earl Blaik	8–0–1	#6
1949	Earl Blaik	9–0	#4
1953	Earl Blaik	7–1–1	#14
1958	Earl Blaik	8–0–1	#3
2018	Jeff Monken	11–2	#19
2020	Jeff Monken	9–3	NR

== Bowl games ==
Army has played in 12 bowl games. They have a record of 9–3.

Season	Coach	Bowl	Date	Opponent	Result
1984	Jim Young	Cherry Bowl	December 22, 1984	Michigan State	W 10–6
1985	Jim Young	Peach Bowl	December 31, 1985	Illinois	W 31–29
1988	Jim Young	Sun Bowl	December 24, 1988	Alabama	L 28–29
1996	Bob Sutton	Independence Bowl	December 31, 1996	Auburn	L 29–32
2010	Rich Ellerson	Armed Forces Bowl	December 30, 2010	SMU	W 16–14
2016	Jeff Monken	Heart of Dallas Bowl	December 27, 2016	North Texas	W 38–31 ^{OT}
2017	Jeff Monken	Armed Forces Bowl	December 23, 2017	San Diego State	W 42–35
2018	Jeff Monken	Armed Forces Bowl	December 22, 2018	Houston	W 70–14
2020	Jeff Monken	Liberty Bowl	December 31, 2020	West Virginia	L 21–24
2021	Jeff Monken	Armed Forces Bowl	December 22, 2021	Missouri	W 24–22
2024	Jeff Monken	Independence Bowl	December 28, 2024	Louisiana Tech	W 27–6
2025	Jeff Monken	Fenway Bowl	December 27, 2025	UConn	W 41–16

=== Future bowl tie-ins ===
The NCAA's football oversight committee determined the number of primary bowl tie-ins for each FBS conference and FBS independent for the 2020–2025 bowl cycle using eligibility data from the 2014–2017 seasons. The Black Knights received one guaranteed tie-in per year. On October 24, 2019, the West Point Athletic Department announced that they had agreed to a contract that placed their team, if eligible, in the Independence Bowl for three of the six years, with the remaining years being contracted to an ESPN Events-owned bowl.

The contract includes a clause that allows Army the ability to accept a bid from a different bowl game once during the three-year agreement with the Independence Bowl and once during the three-year agreement with ESPN Events. Aligning with this, on November 5 Army announced that it had agreed to a secondary contractual tie-in with the Duke's Mayo Bowl. It agreed that it would serve as the primary backup for the bowl and would have the opportunity to accept an invitation to the game twice during the six-year cycle. The Duke's Mayo Bowl's primary tie-ins for the 2020–2025 cycle are the ACC (all years), the SEC (odd years), and the Big Ten (even years); if any of those conferences were unable to place a team into the bowl during any of those years, Army would be extended an invitation to fill their place. The opponent conferences for the Independence Bowl were announced to be the Pac-12 and the American on January 30, 2020.

Season	Bowl	Opponent
2020	Independence Bowl	Pac-12
2021	ESPN Owned and Operated Bowl	–
2022	Independence Bowl	American
2023	ESPN Owned and Operated Bowl	–
2024	Independence Bowl	Pac-12
2025	ESPN Owned and Operated Bowl	–

The Duke's Mayo Bowl can extend an invitation to Army once during the even years (2020, 2022, 2026) and once during the odd years (2021, 2023, 2025) to fill a vacancy as part of a secondary tie-in.

ESPN Events operates the following 16 bowls that Army could be invited to during odd years of the cycle:

- Armed Forces Bowl
- Birmingham Bowl
- Boca Raton Bowl
- Cure Bowl
- Famous Idaho Potato Bowl
- Fenway Bowl
- First Responder Bowl
- Frisco Bowl
- Gasparilla Bowl
- Hawaii Bowl
- Las Vegas Bowl
- Myrtle Beach Bowl
- New Mexico Bowl
- Salute to Veterans Bowl (formerly Camellia Bowl)
- Texas Bowl
- Xbox Bowl (replaced the Bahamas Bowl from 2025)

== Head coaches ==
Coach	Years	Seasons	Games	Record	Pct.	Bowl Games
Dennis Michie†	1890, 1892	1	6	3–2–1	.583	
Henry L. Williams	1891	1	7	5–1–1	.786	
Laurie Bliss	1893	1	9	4–5	.444	
Harmon S. Graves	1894–1895	2	14	10–4	.714	
George P. Dyer	1896	1	6	3–2–1	.583	
Herman Koehler	1897–1900	4	33	19–11–3	.621	
Leon Kromer	1901	1	8	5–1–2	.750	
Dennis E. Nolan	1902	1	8	6–1–1	.813	
Edward Leonard King	1903	1	9	6–2–1	.722	
Robert Boyers	1904–1905	2	18	11–6–1	.639	
Henry Smither	1906–1907	2	10	7–2–1	.750	
Ernest Graves, Sr.	1906, 1912	2	16	7–8–1	.469	
Harry Nelly	1908–1910	3	22	15–5–2	.727	
Joseph Beacham	1911	1	8	6–1–1	.813	
Charles Dudley Daly	1913–1916, 1919–1922	8	74	58–13–3	.804	
Geoffrey Keyes	1917	1	8	7–1	.875	
Hugh Mitchell	1918	1	1	1–0	1.000	
John McEwan	1923–1925	3	26	18–5–3	.750	
Biff Jones	1926–1929	4	40	30–8–2	.775	
Ralph Sasse	1930–1932	3	32	25–5–2	.813	
Garrison H. Davidson	1933–1937	5	47	35–11–1	.755	
William H. Wood	1938–1940	3	28	12–13–1	.481	
Earl Blaik	1941–1958	18	164	121–33–10	.768	
Dale Hall	1959–1961	3	29	16–11–2	.586	
Paul Dietzel	1962–1965	4	40	21–18–1	.538	
Tom Cahill	1966–1973	8	81	40–39–2	.506	
Homer Smith	1974–1978	5	55	21–33–1	.391	
Lou Saban	1979	1	11	2–8–1	.227	
Ed Cavanaugh	1980–1982	3	33	10–21–2	.333	
Jim Young	1983–1990	8	91	51–39–1	.566	3
Bob Sutton	1991–1999	9	100	44–55–1	.445	1
Todd Berry	2000–2003	4	41	5–36	.122	
John Mumford	2003	1	6	0–6	.000	
Bobby Ross	2004–2006	3	34	9–25	.265	
Stan Brock	2007–2008	2	24	6–18	.250	
Rich Ellerson	2009–2013	5	61	20–41	.328	1
Jeff Monken	2014–present	11	141	83–58	.589	6

† Dennis Michie coached 1 game in 1890, and then coached a full season in 1892.

== Rivalries ==
=== Commander-in-Chief's Trophy ===
Air Force, Army, and Navy have played each other every year since 1972 for the Commander-in Chief's Trophy. Air Force leads the FBS service academies with 21 victories, Navy has 16 victories, and Army has 10 victories, with the trophy being shared 5 times. Navy is the current holder of the trophy.

==== Air Force ====
Air Force and Army meet annually and vie for the Commander-in-Chief's Trophy. Air Force leads Army 38–19–1 through the 2023 season. In a shocking upset Army defeated Air Force on November 4, 2023, in Denver at Empower Field. Air Force was nationally ranked and undefeated going into the game. Army prevailed 23–3.

After the Navy–Notre Dame game was canceled in 2020, the Army–Air Force game became the longest uninterrupted intersectional rivalry in college football.

==== Navy ====
Army and Navy play each other annually in the Army–Navy game, which is also a part of the Commander-in-Chief's Trophy. This series is one of the NCAA's oldest and most traditional rivalries. They first met in 1890, and have played each other annually since 1930. The games are generally played at a neutral site. Navy leads the series 63–55–7 through the 2024 season.

=== Notre Dame ===
Notre Dame is a rivalry which some feel has fallen into obscurity. In much of the early 20th century, Army and Notre Dame were considered football powerhouses, and met 34 times between 1913 and 1947. Though the rivalry has slowed down, they last met in 2024, with Notre Dame winning 49–14. Many media members considered the 1946 contest to be the "Game of the Century". Notre Dame leads the series 40–8–4 through the 2024 season.

== Michie Stadium ==
Michie Stadium, which opened in 1924, is the home stadium of the Army Black Knights in West Point, New York. The stadium is named after the first Army football head coach, Dennis Michie. In 1999, the field was renamed Blaik Field at Michie Stadium in honor of former coach Earl Blaik.

In 1999, Sports Illustrated ranked Michie Stadium the third-best sports venue of the 20th century.

== Traditions ==
Songs

Alma Mater is the Army's school song. Army's fight song is "On, Brave Old Army Team". Army also plays other organized cheers; Army Rocket Yell, Black, Gold, and Gray, and USMA Cheer.

Mascot

Army's mascots are the Army Mules. While dating back to 1899, they were officially adopted as mascots by West Point in 1936.

== College Football Hall of Fame ==
The following four individuals have been inducted into the College Football Hall of Fame as coaches.

Name	Position	Years at Army	Inducted
Biff Jones	HC	1926–1929	1954
Earl "Red" Blaik	HC	1941–1958	1964
Jim Young	HC	1983–1999	1999
Henry L. Williams	HC	1891	1951

The following 24 individuals have been inducted into the College Football Hall of Fame as players. Daly and McEwan also served as Army's head coach.

Name	Position	Years at Army	Inducted
Charlie Daly	QB	1901–1902	1951
Chris Cagle	HB	1926–1929	1954
Ed Garbisch	C/OG	1921–1924	1954
Elmer Oliphant	FB	1916–1917	1955
Glenn Davis	HB	1943–1946	1961
John McEwan	C	1913–1916	1962
Doc Blanchard	FB	1944–1946	1964
Paul Bunker	HB/OT	1901–1902	1969
Harry Wilson	HB	1924	1973
Barney Poole	TE/DE	1944–1946	1974
Alex Weyand	OT	1914–1915	1974
Pete Dawkins	HB	1956–1958	1975
Harvey Jablonsky	OG	1931–1933	1978
Bud Sprague	OT	1926–1927	1979
Bill Carpenter	TE	1957–1959	1982
Arnold Galiffa	QB	1947–1949	1983
Doug Kenna	QB	1942–1944	1984
Don Holleder	End/QB	1953–1955	1985
Robin Olds	T	1941–1942	1985
Joe Steffy	OG	1945–1947	1987
John Green	OG	1943–1945	1989
Frank Merritt	OT	1942–1943	1996
Bob Anderson	HB	1957–1959	2004
Arnold Tucker	QB	1945–1946	2008

=== Other notable players ===
President of the United States and General of the Army Dwight D. Eisenhower and General of the Army Omar Bradley were on the 1912 Army football team. Eisenhower was injured and his football career was over by 1913, when the two future generals were juniors. Bradley, a star of the Army baseball team for four years, was on the field in 1913 when Notre Dame upset Army in a historic college football game in which the forward pass was used for the first time. Bradley played end opposite the legendary Knute Rockne, the Notre Dame end who later coached the Irish to national championships before dying in a plane crash near Bazaar, Kansas, on Easter Friday in 1931.

== Retired numbers ==
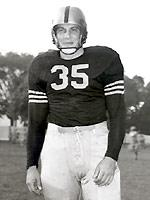
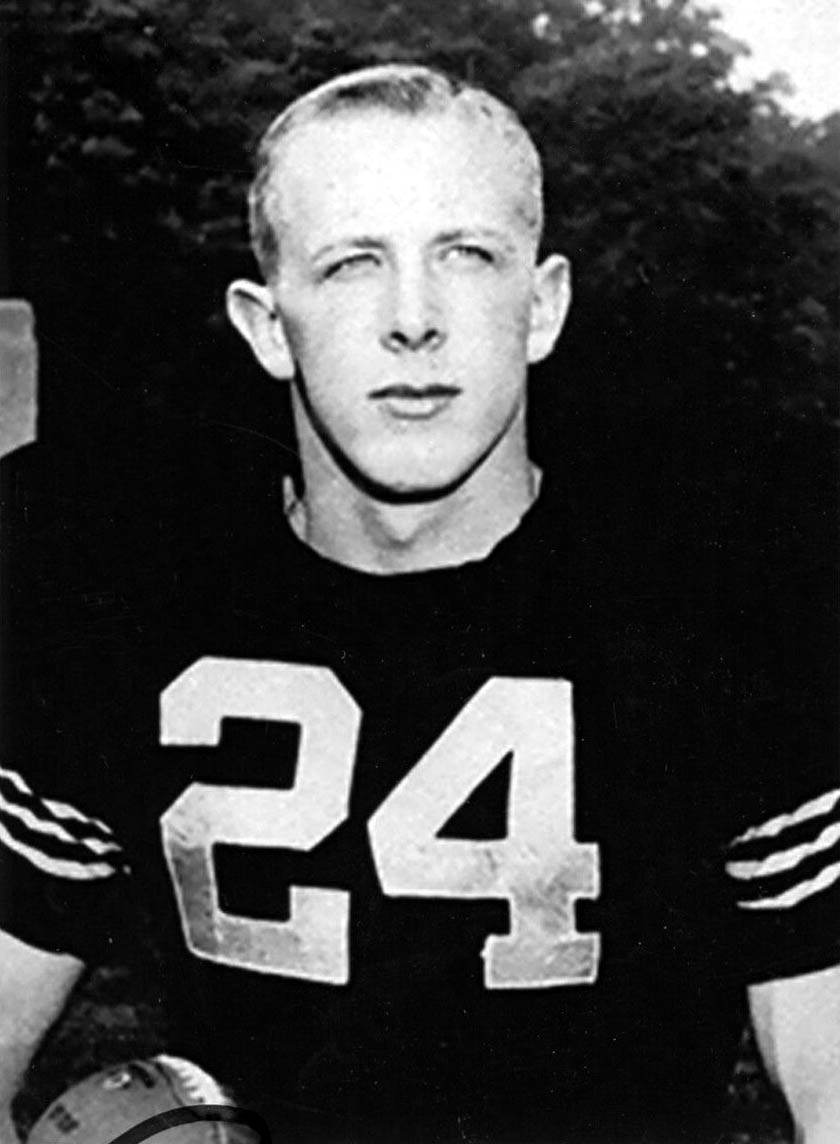
Pete Dawkins (right) and Doc Blanchard, two of the players who have their numbers retired by Army

Army Black Knights retired numbers
No.	Player	Pos.	Tenure	No. ret.	Ref.
24	Pete Dawkins	HB	1956–1958	2008	
35	Doc Blanchard	FB	1944–1946	2009	
41	Glenn Davis	HB	1943–1946	2005	
61	Joe Steffy	G	1945–1947	2009	

== Award winners ==
- Heisman Trophy

Doc Blanchard – 1945
Glenn Davis – 1946
Pete Dawkins – 1958

- AFCA Coach of the Year

Earl Blaik – 1946
Tom Cahill – 1966

- Eddie Robinson Coach of the Year

Tom Cahill – 1966

- Bobby Dodd Coach of the Year

Bob Sutton – 1996

- George Munger Collegiate Coach of the Year

Jeff Monken – 2018

- Vince Lombardi College Football Coach of the Year

Jeff Monken – 2018

- President's Award

Jeff Monken – 2018

- ECAC Division I FBS Football Coach of the Year

Jeff Monken – 2021

- AFCA Division I FBS Assistant Coach of the Year

Sean Saturnio – 2024

- Maxwell Award

Glenn Davis – 1944
Doc Blanchard – 1945
Pete Dawkins – 1958

- Outland Trophy

Joe Steffy – 1947

- William V. Campbell Trophy

Andrew Rodriguez – 2011

- James E. Sullivan Award

Doc Blanchard 1945
Arnold Tucker 1946
Andrew Rodriguez – 2011

- Defender of the Nation Award

Andrew King – 2016
Arik Smith – 2021

== Future schedules ==
Announced schedules as of November 19, 2026.

2026	2027	2028	2029	2030	2031	2032	2033	2034	2035	2036
Bryant		at Boston College	The Citadel	at Old Dominion	at Middle Tennessee	Old Dominion			Louisiana Tech	at UMass
at Louisiana Tech	at Air Force		at Missouri	Eastern Michigan	Cincinnati	at UMass		at Troy		
Air Force	at UConn	Air Force	at Air Force	Air Force	at Air Force	Air Force	at Air Force	Air Force	at Air Force	Air Force
vs. Navy^{1}	vs. Navy^{2}	vs. Navy^{2}	vs. Navy^{3}	vs. Navy^{2}	vs. Navy^{3}	vs. Navy^{2}	vs. Navy^{3}	vs. Navy^{2}	vs. Navy^{3}	vs. Navy^{3}

1. At MetLife Stadium, East Rutherford, NJ
2. At Lincoln Financial Field, Philadelphia, PA
3. At TBD
- In 2033, Army currently has five non–conference games scheduled and needs to eliminate one more.

== Radio ==
Radio rights are held by Learfield through Army West Point Sports Properties, a joint venture with the USMA, and are branded on-air as the "Army Sports Network from Learfield". Pamal Broadcasting-owned WGHQ in Kingston, New York serves as the network's flagship station.

=== Former affiliates (1 station) ===
- WVKZ/1240: Schenectady

=== Current broadcast team ===
Army Sports Network

- Rich DeMarco (play-by-play)
- Dean Darling (color analyst)
- Tony Morino (sideline reporter)
- Joe Beckerle (pre and post-game)

== See also ==
- Emerald Isle Classic

== Bibliography ==
- Anderson, Lars (2007). Carlisle vs. Army: Jim Thorpe, Dwight Eisenhower, Pop Warner, and the Forgotten Story of Football's Greatest Battle. Random House. ISBN 978-1400066001.
- Drape, Joe (2012). Soldiers First: Duty, Honor, Country, and Football at West Point. Macmillan Publishers. ISBN 978-1429955348.
