= List of sportspeople educated at the United States Military Academy =

The United States Military Academy (USMA) is an undergraduate college in West Point, New York that educates and commissions officers for the United States Army. The Academy is a member of the Division I Patriot League in most sports, but its men's ice hockey program competes in the Atlantic Hockey league and its football program competes independent of a league. The academy fields 24 club sports teams. In addition, about 65% of the cadets compete in intramural sports, known at the academy as "company athletics".

This list is drawn from alumni of the Military Academy who are athletes or athletic coaches. Eleven alumni have competed in the Olympic Games as athletes or coaches. The first was George S. Patton (class of 1909) in the modern pentathlon at the 1912 Summer Olympics. The most recent is Mike Krzyzewski (class of 1969), who was head coach of the U.S. men's basketball team at the 2016 Summer Olympics. Three alumni are recipients of college football's Heisman Trophy: Doc Blanchard (class of 1947), Glenn Davis (class of 1947), and Pete Dawkins (class of 1959). Bob Mischak (class of 1954) was named No. 7 on NFL.com's list of Top Ten All Time NFL Players from service academies, and was a three-time Super Bowl winner.

== Athletic figures ==
Note: "Class year" refers to the alumni's class year, which usually is the same year they graduated. However, in times of war, classes often graduate early.

=== Athletes ===
Name	Class year	Notability	References
Abner Doubleday	1842	Major general during the American Civil War; subject of a myth that he invented baseball	
Guy Henry	1898	Major general; Spanish–American War, Philippine–American War, World War I, World War II; commander of the 3rd Cavalry Regiment; recipient of two Army Distinguished Service Medals and the Silver Star; son of brigadier general, Medal of Honor recipient, and Puerto Rico governor Guy Vernor Henry; bronze medalist at the 1912 Summer Olympics in equestrianism	
Paul Bunker	1903	Colonel; selected as a member of the College Football All-America Team in 1901 and 1902 and as the retroactive Heisman Trophy winner for 1902 by Sports Illustrated; member of the College Football Hall of Fame	
George S. Patton	1909	General; 1912 Summer Olympics, modern pentathlon, 5th place; Pancho Villa Expedition; World War II; Battle of Saint-Mihiel, Meuse-Argonne Offensive; commander of the 1st Tank Brigade/304th Tank Brigade; commander of the 3rd Cavalry Regiment; commander of the 2nd Armored Division; commander of the II Corps; commander of the Seventh United States Army, Third United States Army, and Fifteenth United States Army during World War II; descendant of Brigadier General Hugh Mercer; father of Major General George Patton IV; Patton series of tanks were named for him	
Elmer Oliphant	1918	World War I; professional football player; considered one of the all-time greatest college football players; established world record in 220-yard (200 m) low hurdles	
P.C. Hains	1924	Major general; cavalry officer; modern pentathlon at the 1928 Summer Olympics	
John Roosma	1926	Colonel during World War II; Basketball Hall of Fame; the academy's basketball Most Valuable Player award is named after him	
Robin Olds	1943	Brigadier general; World War II, Vietnam War; group commander in the 86th Fighter-Interceptor Wing; commander of the No. 1 Squadron RAF and 434th Fighter Squadron; commander of the 81st Tactical Wing and the 8th Tactical Fighter Wing; recipient of the Air Force Cross, two Air Force Distinguished Service Medals, and four Silver Stars; son of Major General Robert Olds; member of the College Football Hall of Fame	
Doc Blanchard	1947	United States Air Force fighter pilot; combat veteran of Vietnam War; football player known as "Mr. Inside" who won the Heisman Trophy, Maxwell Award, and James E. Sullivan Award, all in 1945	
Glenn Woodward Davis	1947	Served three years in the Army before joining the Los Angeles Rams; football player known as "Mr. Outside" who won the Maxwell Award (1944) and Heisman Trophy (1946)	
James V. Hartinger	1949	United States Air Force General; fighter pilot; combat veteran of Korean War and Vietnam War; National Lacrosse Hall of Fame inductee; Hartinger Medal for significant contributions to the military space mission named after him	
Dan Foldberg	1951	Colonel; infantry officer and combat veteran of the Korean War and Vietnam War; football and lacrosse All-American at the academy; Earl Blaik called him the greatest end he coached; drafted by the Detroit Lions football team but chose a career in the Army instead	
Bill Carpenter	1959	Lieutenant general; Distinguished Service Cross recipient during the Vietnam War; paratrooper; football player known as the "Lonesome End"; College Football Hall of Fame inductee	
Pete Dawkins	1959	Brigadier general; Heisman Trophy Maxwell Award winner (1958); Rhodes Scholar; PhD from Princeton University; paratrooper; recipient of two Bronze Stars during the Vietnam War; only cadet in history to simultaneously be brigade commander, president of his class, captain of the football team, and a "Star Man" in the top five percent of his class academically	
Ronald Zinn	1962	Captain; killed in action in 1965 during the Vietnam War; race walker in the 1960 Summer Olympics and 6th place in racewalking in the 1964 Summer Olympics	
Mike Silliman	1966	Captain; gold medal in men's basketball at the 1968 Summer Olympics	
Michael Thornberry	1994	First lieutenant; ninth place in team handball in the 1996 Summer Olympics	
Dan Hinote	1996	Ice hockey forward who played professionally in the National Hockey League (NHL), American Hockey League (AHL), Ontario Hockey League (OHL) and internationally; subsequently a coach	
Dan Browne	1997	First lieutenant; professional distance runner; 2002 U.S. Marathon champion; 2004 Summer Olympics competitor at 10 km and marathon	
Ronnie McAda	1997	First lieutenant; last pick in the 1997 NFL draft, selected by the Green Bay Packers, thus earning the distinction of being a Mr. Irrelevant	
Anita Allen	2000	Captain; placed eighteenth in the modern pentathlon at the 2004 Summer Olympics	
Lorenzo Smith III	2000	Captain; placed sixth in bobsledding at the 2006 Winter Olympics	
Boyd Melson	2003	Captain; boxer, 2004 World Military Boxing Championships, gold medal (69-kg. weight class)	
Brad Roberts	2006	Ice hockey goalie who played professionally in the Canadian Hockey League (CHL) with the Youngstown Steelhounds 2006–08 after playing at Army 2002–06	
Caleb Campbell	2007	First lieutenant; selected by the Detroit Lions with the 218th pick (7th round) in the 2008 NFL draft	
Zach McKelvie	2009	Ice hockey defenseman who played professionally in the American Hockey League (AHL) and East Coast Hockey League (ECHL) 2011–14 after spending four seasons at Army 2005–09	
Alejandro Villanueva	2010	Captain; infantry officer, combat veteran of the War in Afghanistan, and recipient of the Bronze Star with "V" Device; offensive tackle for the Pittsburgh Steelers and Baltimore Ravens	
Stewart Glenister	2011	West Point cadet; represented American Samoa in 50 m freestyle swimming at the 2008 Summer Olympics	
Stephen Scherer	2011	West Point cadet; made the U.S. 2008 Summer Olympics team in 10 m air rifle team at the age of 19 as a plebe	
Josh McNary	2011	First lieutenant; linebacker for the Indianapolis Colts	
Collin Mooney	2012	First lieutenant; fullback who played for the Tennessee Titans and the Atlanta Falcons	
Chris Rowley	2013	American baseball pitcher for the Toronto Blue Jays of Major League Baseball (MLB)	
Brett Toth	2018	American football offensive tackle for the Philadelphia Eagles of the National Football League (NFL); also saw time with the Arizona Cardinals from 2019-2020 and the Carolina Panthers in 2023 before returning to Philly. Super Bowl champion with the Eagles in 2025 (LIX)	
Cole Christiansen	2019	American football linebacker for the Kansas City Chiefs and previously the Los Angeles Chargers of the National Football League (NFL); Super Bowl champion with Kansas City in 2022 and 2023 (LVII) and (LVIII)	
Elijah Riley	2020	American football defensive back for the New York Giants, Philadelphia Eagles, New York Jets and Pittsburgh Steelers of the National Football League (NFL)	
Jacob Hurtubise	2020	American baseball outfielder for the Cincinnati Reds of Major League Baseball (MLB)	
Sammy Sullivan	2020	American rugby athlete and 2024 Team USA Olympian; competed for the US at the 2024 Summer Olympics, where the team earned a bronze medal	
Tom Rigney	2020	Lacrosse defenseman who played for the Denver Outlaws of the Premier Lacrosse League (PLL) in 2020	
Jon Rhattigan	2021	American football linebacker for the Las Vegas Raiders and previously of the Pittsburgh Steelers, Carolina Panthers and Seattle Seahawks of the National Football League (NFL)	
Connelly Early	2021-22	American baseball Minor League pitcher for the Boston Red Sox of Major League Baseball (MLB)	
Andre Carter II	2023	American football linebacker for the Miami Dolphins and previously for the Detroit Lions, Las Vegas Raiders and Minnesota Vikings of the National Football League (NFL)	
Jimmy Ciarlo	2024	American football linebacker for the Miami Dolphins and previously for the Buffalo Bills and New York Jets of the National Football League (NFL)	
Lucas Scott	2025	American football fullback for the Baltimore Ravens of the National Football League (NFL)	

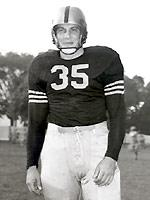
Felix "Doc" Blanchard

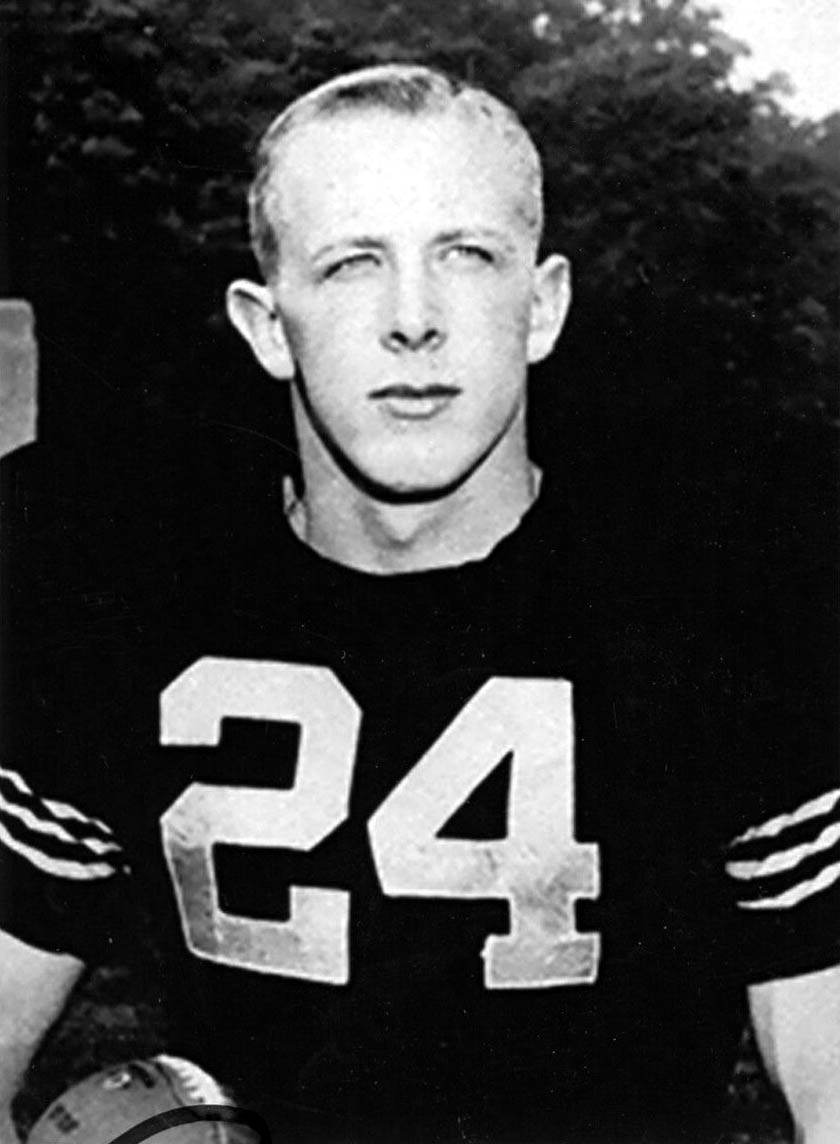
Pete Dawkins

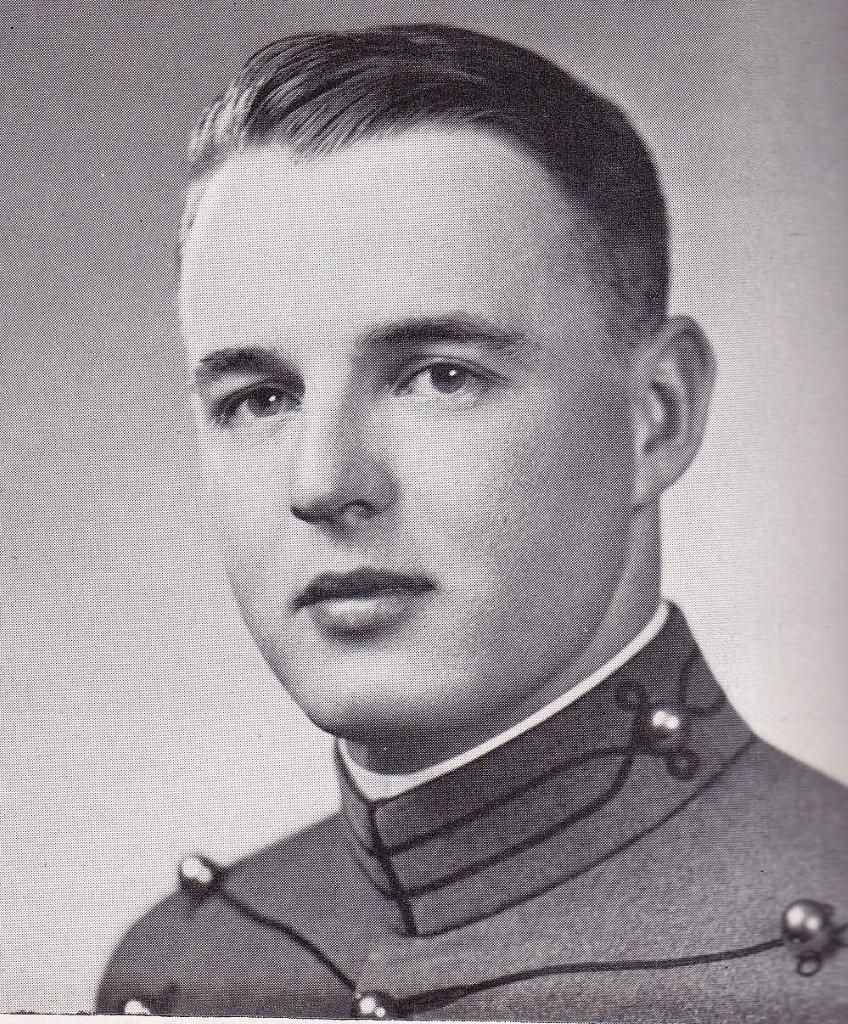
Glenn Davis

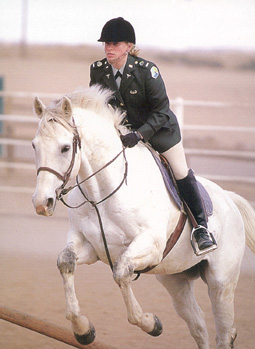
Anita Allen

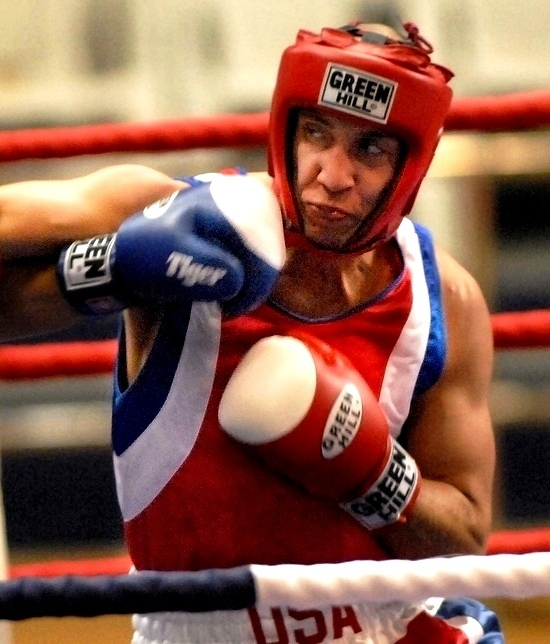
Boyd Melson

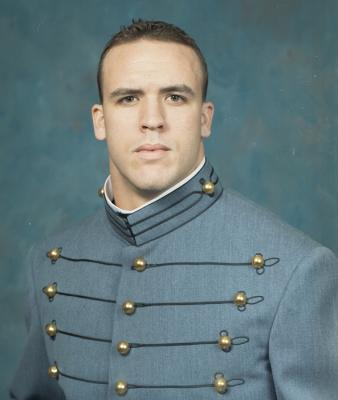
Caleb Campbell

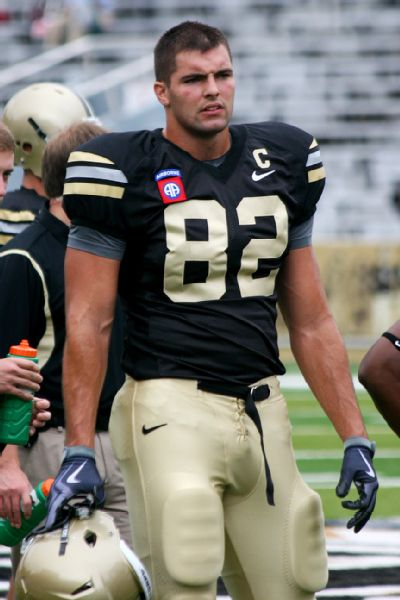
Alejandro Villanueva

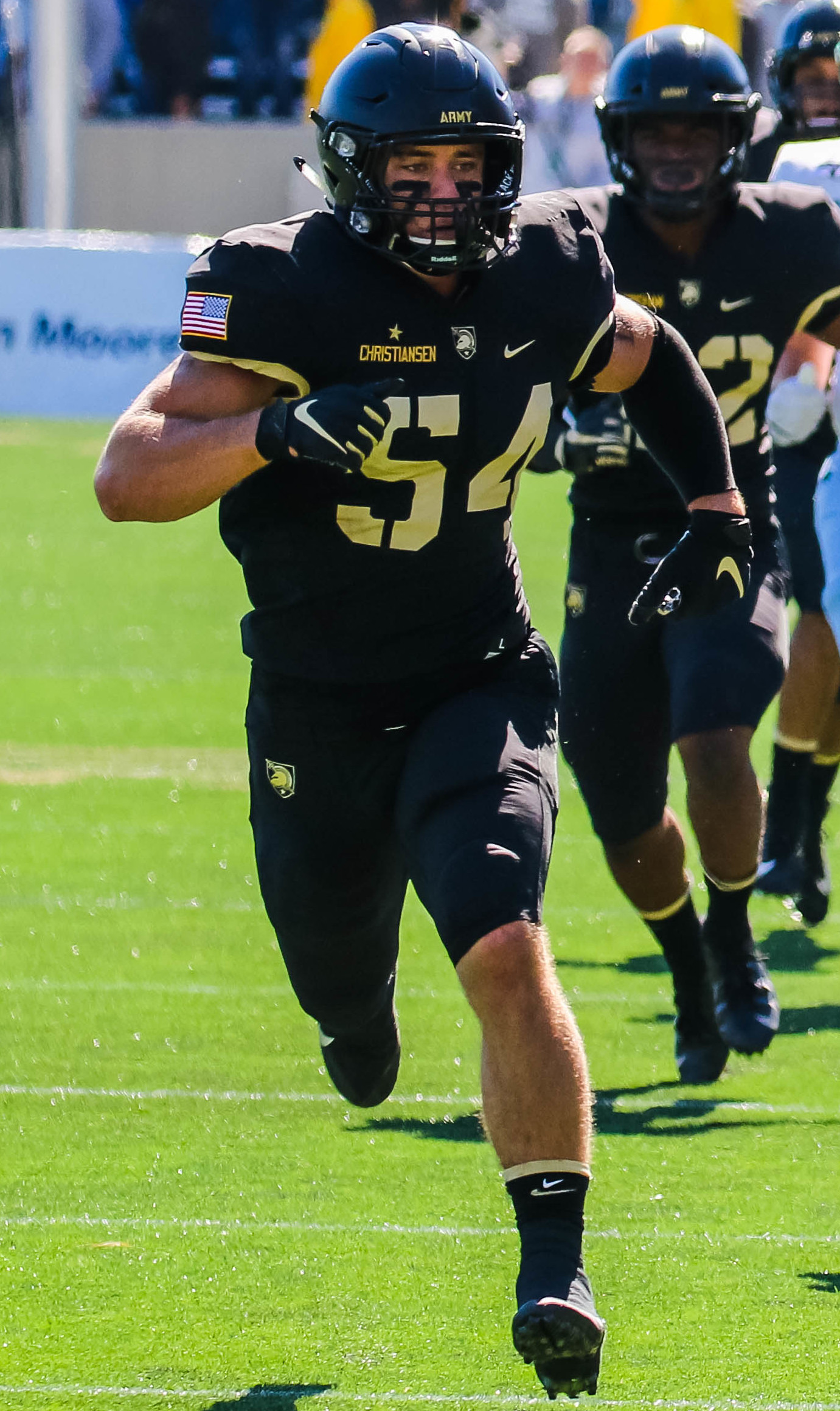
Cole Christiansen

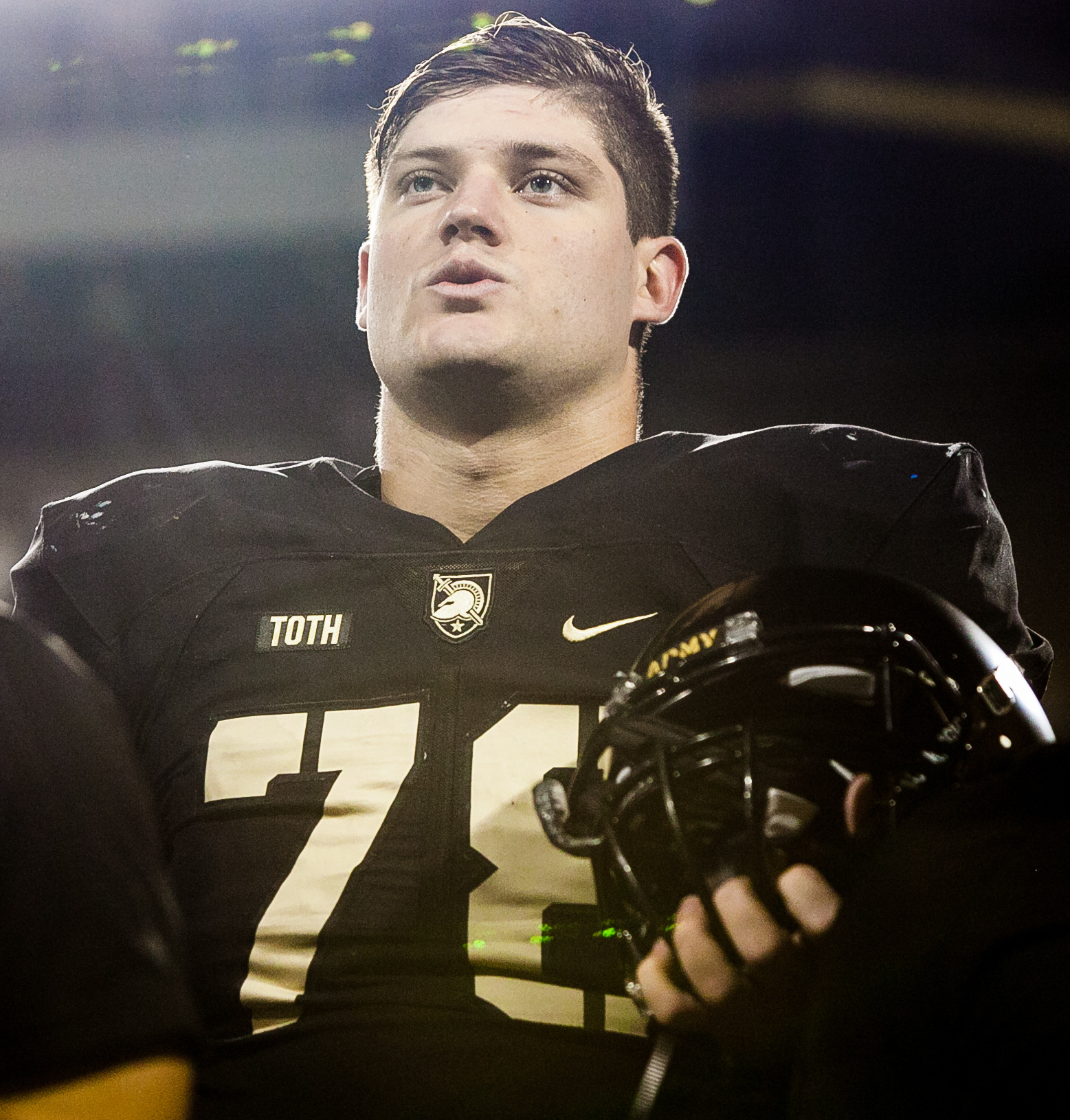
Brett Toth

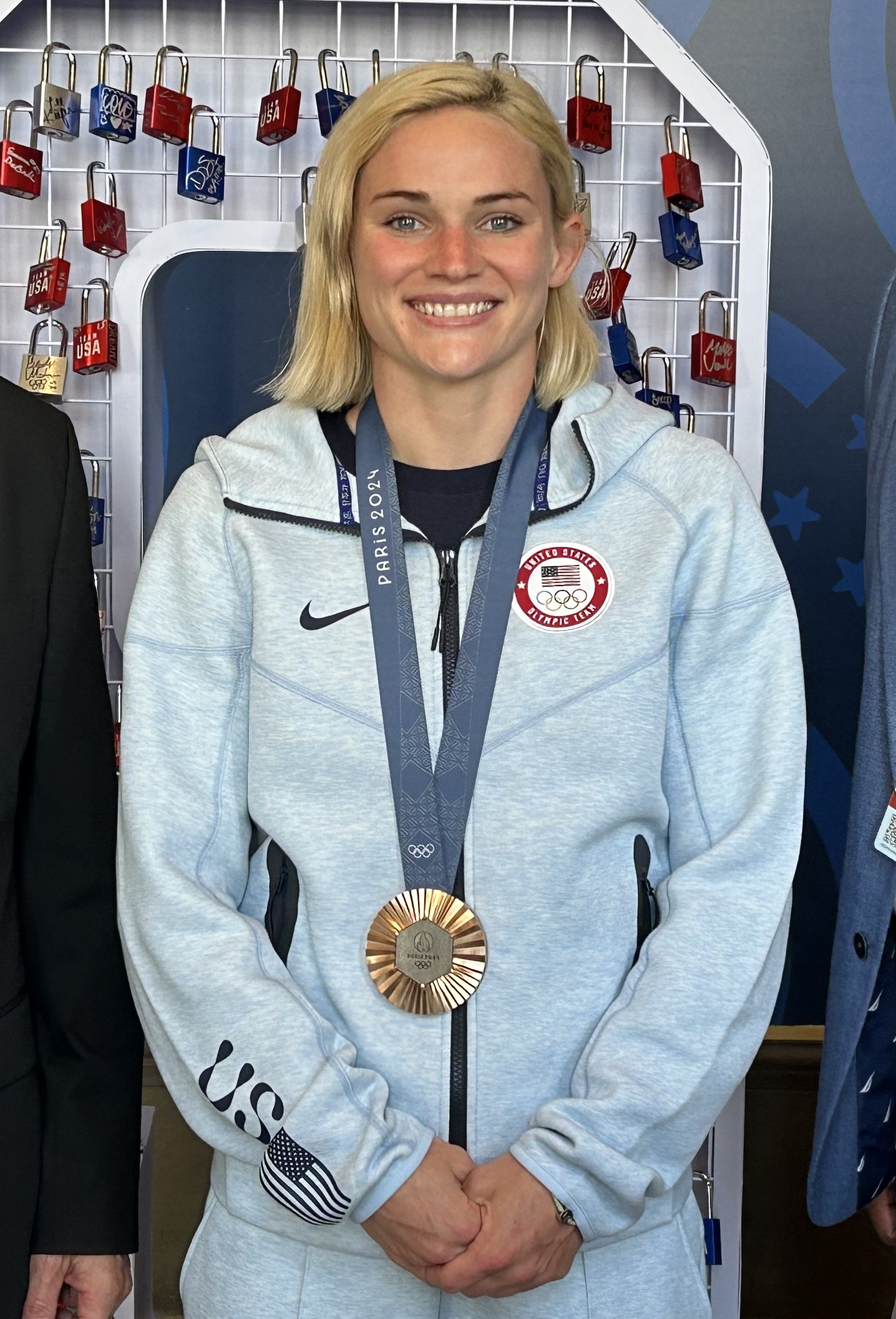
Sammy Sullivan

=== Coaches ===
Name	Class year	Notability	References
Charles S. Farnsworth	1883	Major general; Spanish–American War; University of North Dakota head football coach (1895–1896)	
Joseph Stilwell	1904	General; organized and was head coach of the first basketball team at West Point	
Charles Dudley Daly	1905	Lieutenant colonel; World War I; "Godfather of West Point Football"; early promoter of American football	
Robert Neyland	1916	Brigadier general; World War I; University of Tennessee head football coach (1926–1939) and (1946–1952); member of College Football Hall of Fame (as a coach); four-time national champion and five-time SEC champion at Tennessee	
Earl Blaik	1920	Cavalry officer for two years; head football coach at Dartmouth College (1934–1940) and United States Military Academy (1941–1958); member of College Football Hall of Fame; two-time national champion at Army (as a coach)	
Robert V. Whitlow	1943	United States Army Air Forces and Air Force fighter and bomber pilot, World War II; head football coach (1955) and athletic director (1954–1957) of the Air Force Academy; "athletic director" of the Chicago Cubs baseball club (1963–1965)	
Bill Yeoman	1948	Head coach at the University of Houston; member of the College Football Hall of Fame; inventor of the Veer Offense; played prominent role in racial integration of college athletics in the South; captain of undefeated 1948 Army football team and second team All-American center; only underclassman to captain an Army football team	
Mike Krzyzewski	1969	Captain; recipient of West Point Association of Graduates Distinguished Graduate award in 2005; the winningest head coach in NCAA Division I history. Served as head basketball coach for West Point (1975–1981) and Duke University (1981–2022); men's basketball gold medal-winning team head coach at 2008, 2012, and 2016 Summer Olympics; five-time NCAA national champion; 2001 inductee of the Naismith Memorial Basketball Hall of Fame	
Ben Kotwica	1997	Linebacker and team captain for Army 1993–1996; served in the Army as a helicopter pilot, reaching the rank of captain by 2004; began his NFL coaching career in 2007 with the New York Jets	
Tony Coaxum	2000	Cornerback at Army 1996–1999; coached at West Point 2007–13 before joining the Denver Broncos in 2015, where he helped the team win Super Bowl 50; head coach at Bluefield State 2020–23	

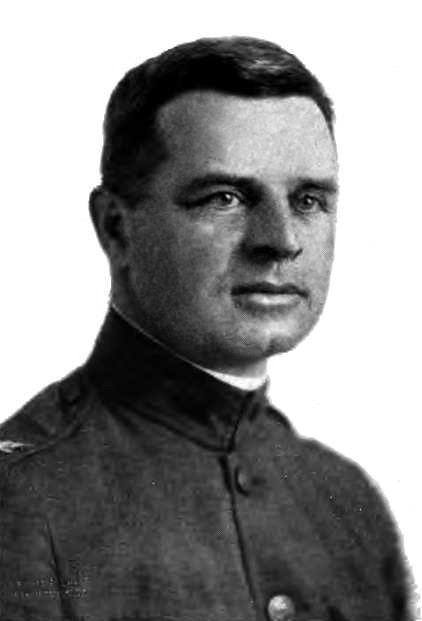
Charles Daly

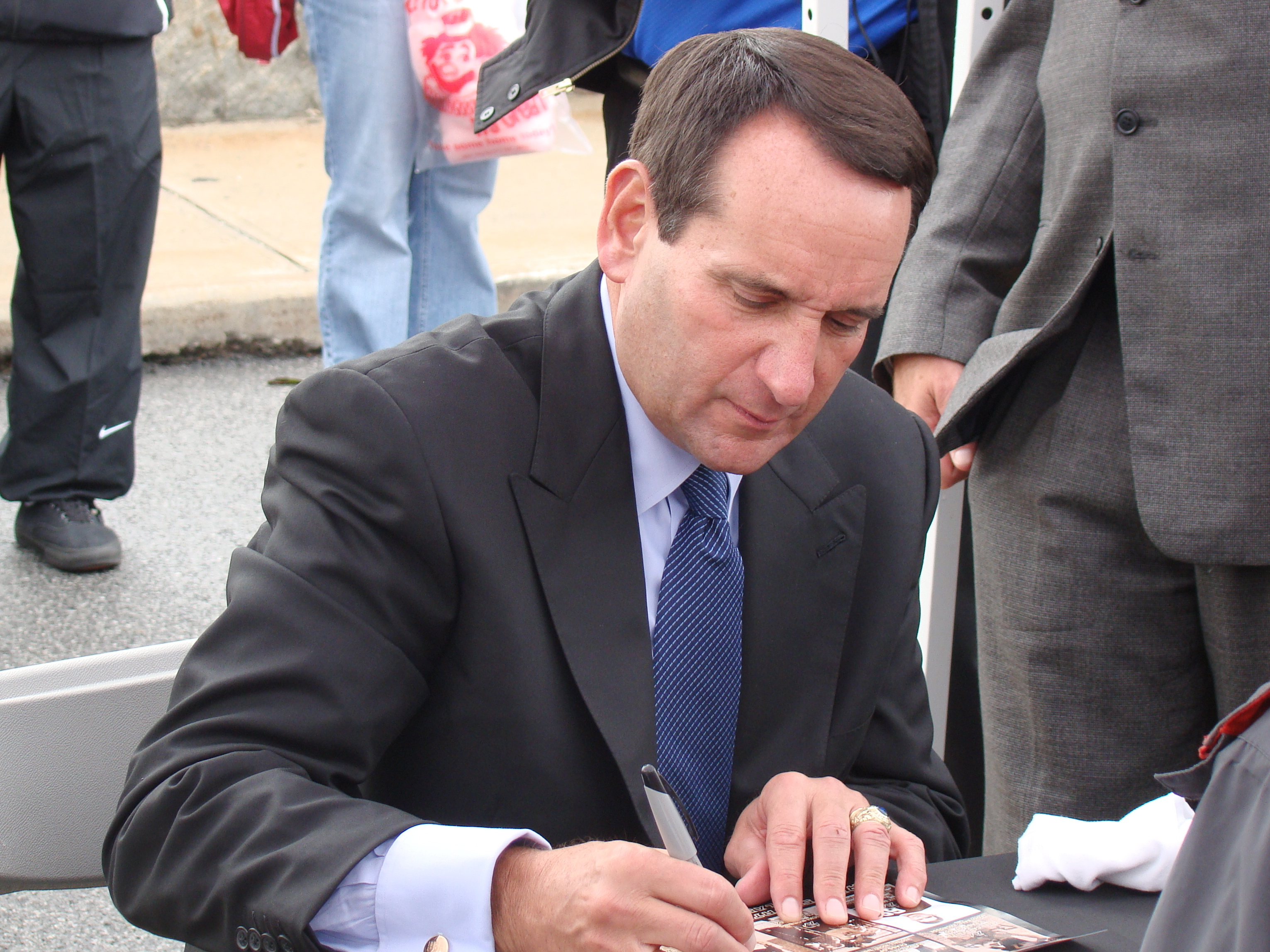
Mike Krzyzewski
