= The Corps, and the Corps, and the Corps =

"The Corps, and the Corps, and the Corps" may refer to:

- Refrain of West Point hymn "The Corps", or "The Corps! The Corps! The Corps!"
- Close of retirement speech of Gen. Douglas MacArthur
