= Bishop Ireton High School =

Location
- 201 Cambridge Road; Alexandria, Virginia 22314; United States

Information
- School type: Private, high school
- Motto: Advance Always
- Religious affiliation: Catholic
- Patron saint: St. Francis de Sales
- Established: 1964; 62 years ago
- Founders: Oblates of St. Francis de Sales
- Oversight: Diocese of Arlington
- Head of School: Kathleen McNutt
- Teaching staff: 100 (FTE) (2026–27)
- Grades: 9–12
- Gender: Coed
- Enrollment: 950 (2026–27)
- Student to teacher ratio: 10∶1 (2026–27)
- Colors: Cardinal; Gold
- Athletics conference: Washington Catholic Athletic Conference
- Nickname: Cardinals
- Rival: Bishop Denis J. O'Connell
- Accreditation: Southern Association of Colleges and Schools
- Newspaper: The BI Word
- Website: Official website

Bishop Ireton High School is a Catholic high school located in Alexandria, Virginia, less than one mile from Old Town Alexandria. The school was founded in 1964 by the Oblates of St. Francis de Sales, and named in honor of Peter Leo Ireton, Bishop of Richmond from 1945 to 1958. The school originally admitted only male students. Bishop Ireton, more commonly known as "BI" or simply "Ireton", became coeducational in 1990 after the closing of sister school, St. Mary's Academy. In 2008, the Oblates withdrew their presence from Ireton and the school is now managed by the Diocese of Arlington.

The patron of Bishop Ireton High School is St. Francis de Sales, a 16th Century apologist and writer of mystical theology, a Doctor of the Church, and patron saint of writers and journalists.

== Notable alumni ==
- Dave Grohl from the Foo Fighters and Nirvana (attended freshman and part of sophomore years)
- Bob McDonnell, former Governor of Virginia
- Andrew Rodriguez, winner of the 2011 Campbell Trophy, given annually to the top scholar-athlete in NCAA Division 1 football
- Kat Radley, comedian
- Jeffrey C. McKay, Chairman of the Fairfax County Board of Supervisors
- Carlos G. Muñiz, Chief Justice of the Supreme Court of Florida
