= Andrew Rodriguez (American football) =

American football player (born 1990)

No. 42
- Position: Linebacker
- Class: 2009–2011

Personal information
- Born: May 12, 1990 (age 36)
- Listed height: 6 ft 3 in (1.91 m)
- Listed weight: 217 lb (98 kg)

Career information
- High school: Alexandria (VA) Bishop Ireton

Awards and highlights
- James E. Sullivan Award (2011); William V. Campbell Trophy (2011)

Andrew Scott Rodriguez (born May 12, 1990) is an American former football player for the Army Black Knights of the United States Military Academy.

A graduate of Bishop Ireton High School in Alexandria, Virginia, Rodriguez started in twelve games as a sophomore for the Black Knights. Prior to his junior season, he suffered a serious back injury which caused him to miss the rest of the season but made a comeback for his senior year, for which he was voted captain by his teammates. He won the 2011 James E. Sullivan Award and the William V. Campbell Trophy.

Rodriguez graduated in 2012, ranking third in his class. His father is General David M. Rodriguez, Commanding General of the United States Africa Command (AFRICOM).

Pre-draft measurables
| Height | Weight |
|---|---|
| 6 ft 2 3/8 in (1.89 m) | 218 lb (99 kg) |
Values from Pro Day
