= Philip Egner =

American military bandmaster (1870–1956)

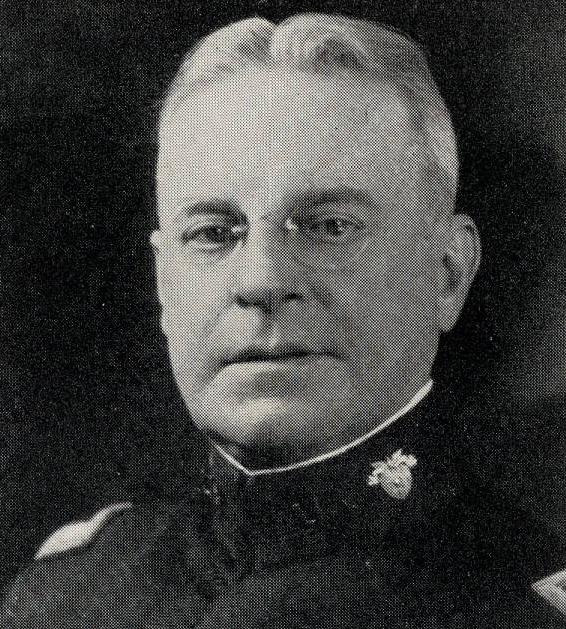
- Egner pictured in 1928 at the age of 58.
- Born: April 17, 1870; New York, New York, United States
- Died: February 3, 1956 (aged 85)
- Burial place: West Point Cemetery
- Spouse: Anna Habsen
- Military career
- Allegiance: United States
- Branch: U.S. Army
- Service years: 1898–1901; 1909–1934
- Rank: Captain
- Units: 17th Infantry Regiment; U.S. Military Academy
- Commands: West Point Band
- Awards: Spanish Campaign Medal

Philip Egner (April 17, 1870 – February 3, 1956) was a U.S. military bandmaster who served as longtime director of the U.S. Army's West Point Band.

As a child, Egner was a musical prodigy. During his early career he performed with the Metropolitan Opera and New York Philharmonic, but left civilian life to join the U.S. Army at the outbreak of the Spanish–American War, spending three years in the Philippines as bandmaster of the 17th Infantry Regiment. He would later be appointed band director at the U.S. Military Academy at West Point and is best remembered for composing "On, Brave Old Army Team", West Point's fight song.

== Early life ==
Egner was born in New York City to German immigrants Philippe and Emma Egner and grew up in East Orange, New Jersey. His father was a music teacher and, by age six, the younger Egner had mastered the violin; he was described by one account as a "child prodigy". Egner went on to learn additional instruments and, by age 16, was the leader of his own orchestra in Atlantic City, New Jersey.

== Career ==
Early in Egner's career he performed as a cellist with the Metropolitan Opera and the New York Philharmonic. In 1898, on the outbreak of war with Spain, Egner joined the United States Army and was appointed bandmaster of the 17th Infantry Regiment. He spent the next three years in the Philippines.

Returning to the United States, Egner briefly toured the U.S. as an instrumentalist in the vaudevillian performances of Lillian Russell and the minstrel shows of Primrose and West. He later served as director of the Brooklyn Rapid Transit Company Band, and for six years led the band of New York's Hebrew Orphans Asylum (HOA), a Jewish orphanage organized and disciplined along military lines. His HOA band established a reputation as the "best boys' band in the city" and his work with the ensemble has been credited with leading to his appointment as bandmaster at West Point, a post he held from 1909 to his retirement in 1934.

In 1910 Egner collaborated on scripting a new cheer with one of West Point's yell kings. While returning to his quarters, Egner began whistling an improvised tune which he decided would go well with the words for the new cheer, making it more suited for a fight song than a football chant. He scribbled the notes on his shirt cuff and the resulting composition became "On, Brave Old Army Team".

During his time at West Point, Egner also composed the "Official West Point March", among other songs. He scored the 1916 musical comedy staged by the cadets, The Wasp-Waisted Vampires about a time in the future when half the corps of cadets is women and the academy on the verge of being shuttered by the U.S. government on account of a lack of wars (at the end of the show the "good news" arrives that Highland Falls, New York has been invaded, thereby justifying continued congressional appropriations to West Point). In 1932 Egner invited Mabel Bauer, a music teacher in New Haven, Connecticut and wife of a West Point alumnus, to direct the band in performing Franz von Blon's "With Energy and Strength", which marked the first time since the band's formation in 1817 that a woman had taken-up the baton. From 1929 until his retirement five years later, Egner also served as director of the West Point Glee Club.

Major-General Perry Griffith, who attended West Point in the early 1930s, recalled cadet dances of that era held at Camp Clinton – the academy's then summer tactical course for third-year cadets – in a 1983 article for West Point's alumni magazine The Assembly.

Hop music had to be taken casually, for what came out was strictly Philip Egner's boys' idea of jazz, and a shag of Tiger Rag usually sound like "Stars and Stripes Forever" or "French National Defile".

The 1915 edition of the academy's yearbook, The Howitzer, was dedicated by the corps of cadets to Egner for his "unfailing kindness and untiring labor in our behalf".

== Personal life ==
Egner married Emma Hausens in 1895, with whom he had one daughter and one son. Emma died in 1926 and Philip married Gertrude Laswick Specht in 1927. She had 3 sons and 1 daughter. Gertrude died in 1939, and in 1942 Philip married her sister, Anna Laswick. He died in 1956 and is buried in the West Point Cemetery beneath a grave etched with the first seven notes of the chorus to "On, Brave Old Army Team". Anna, his last wife is buried with him. She died in 1967.

== See also ==
- United States military bands
