= Tom Theodorakis =

American college athletic director

Current position
- Title: Athletic director
- Team: Army
- Conference: Patriot League

Biographical details
- Born: February 22, 1984 (age 42); Syracuse, New York
- Education: Syracuse University

Playing career
- 2002–2006: Syracuse
- Position: Defense

Administrative career (AD unless noted)
- 2006-2009: Air Force (Director)
- 2009-2013: Arizona (Assistant AD)
- 2013-2015: UCLA (Associate AD)
- 2015–2021: Arizona (Associate AD)
- 2021–2023: Harvard (Senior Associate AD)
- 2023–2025: Army (Deputy AD)
- 2025–present: Army (AD)

Tom Theodorakis (born February 22, 1984) is the current director of athletics for the United States Military Academy. Theodorakis attended college at Syracuse University, where he played on the Syracuse Orange men's lacrosse team from 2003 to 2006. Theodorakis was part of the Syracuse lacrosse team that won the 2004 NCAA Division I men's lacrosse tournament. Theodorakis worked at the Air Force Academy from 2006–2009 and served as an assistant athletic director at the University of Arizona from 2009 to 2014, as an associate athletic director at the University of California, Los Angeles from 2014 to 2015, as an associate athletic director at the University of Arizona from 2015 to 2021, and as a senior associate athletic director at Harvard University from 2021 to 2022.

He joined the United States Military Academy as deputy athletic director in 2022. Theodorakis was named the school's athletic director on February 6, 2025.
