= On, Brave Old Army Team =

Song
- Published: 1910
- Genre: Fight song
- Songwriter: Philip Egner

"On, Brave Old Army Team" is the fight song of the United States Military Academy. It was composed in 1910 by Philip Egner, the then-director of the West Point Band.

== History ==
In 1910 Philip Egner collaborated on scripting a new cheer with one of West Point's yell kings. While returning to his quarters, Egner began whistling an improvised tune which he decided would go well with the words for the new cheer, making it more suited for a fight song than a football chant. He scribbled the notes on the cuff of his shirt so he wouldn't forget them and the resulting composition became "On, Brave Old Army Team".

The chorus of "On, Brave Old Army Team" sung by West Point's corps of cadets at the 2014 Army–Navy Game.

== Reception and influence ==
"On, Brave Old Army Team" has been called a "classic fight song" by the Phoenix New Times, one of the "50 Greatest College Fight Songs of All Time" by Bleacher Report, one of the "12 best fight songs in college football" by The Buffalo News, and was listed as one of the "Top Twenty-Five College Fight Songs" by William Studwell in his book College Fight Songs II: A Supplementary Anthology.

The importance of the song to cadet morale has been frequently referenced in media reports on West Point athletics, as during the academy's dramatic 1960 football victory over Syracuse University, when Sports Illustrated reported that "at half time, the Orange band marched and the "national champion" baton twirler performed. But the corps roared back with choruses of On, Brave Old Army Team". The tombstone of former West Point football coach Earl Blaik is inscribed with the words "On, Brave Old Army Team". Egner's tombstone, meanwhile, has the first seven notes of the song's chorus etched on it.

== Lyrics ==
"On, Brave Old Army Team"
West Point Band performing in 2013

"On, Brave Old Army Team".
The West Point cadet Glee Club performing

The Army team's the pride and dream
Of every heart in gray.
The Army line you'll ever find
A terror in the fray.
And when the team is fighting
For the Black and Gray and Gold,
We're always near with song and cheer
And this is the tale we're told:
The Army team

Rah! Rah! Rah! Boom!

On, brave old Army team!
On to the fray.
Fight on to victory
For that's the fearless Army way.

== See also ==
- The Corps (song)
