= Army Mules =

Mascots of the United States Military Academy

Army Mule
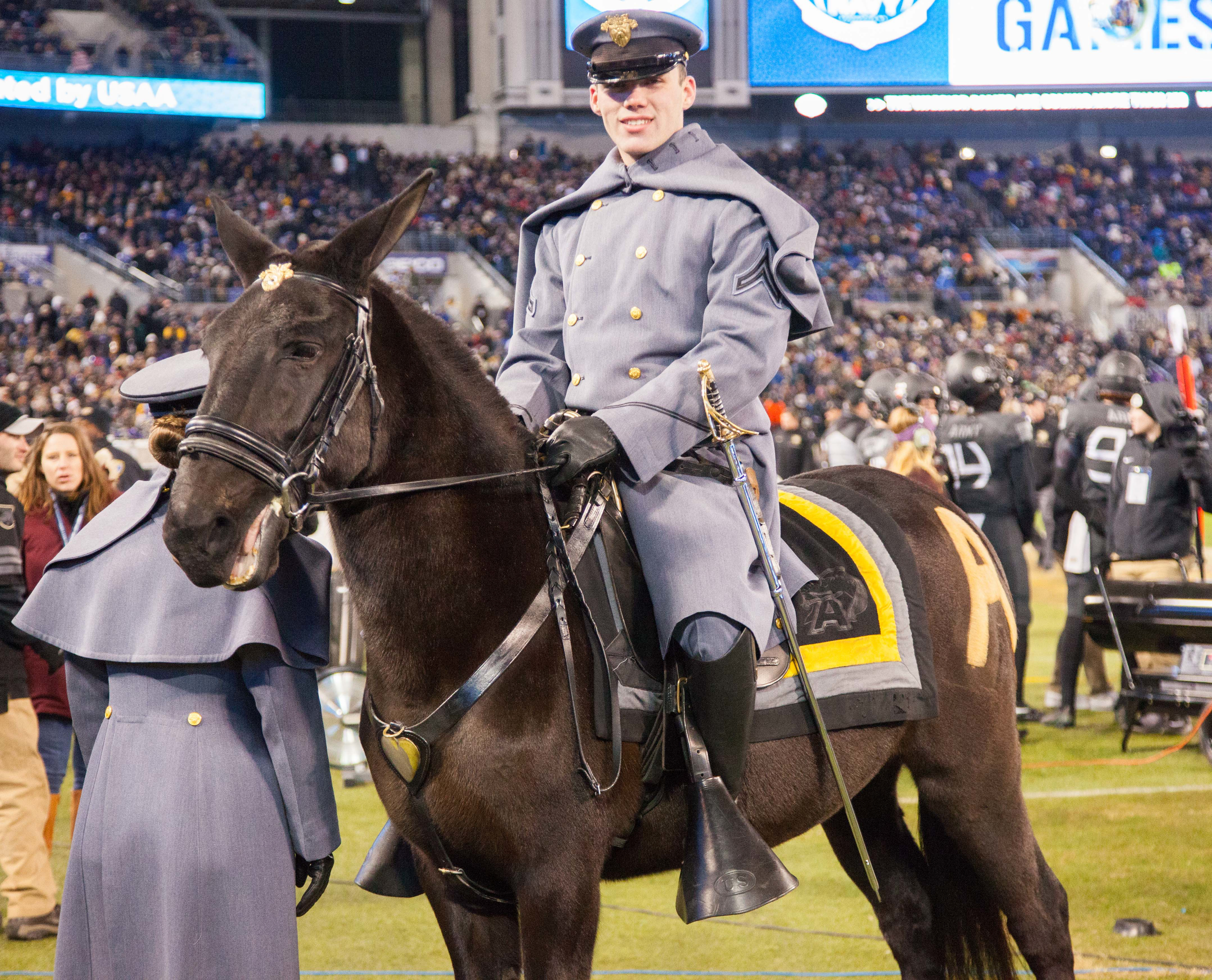
- Army Mule in 2016
- University: United States Military Academy
- Conference: Patriot League
- Description: Live mules
- First seen: 1899

The Army Mules are a group of mules which serve as the mascots for the United States Military Academy in West Point, New York.

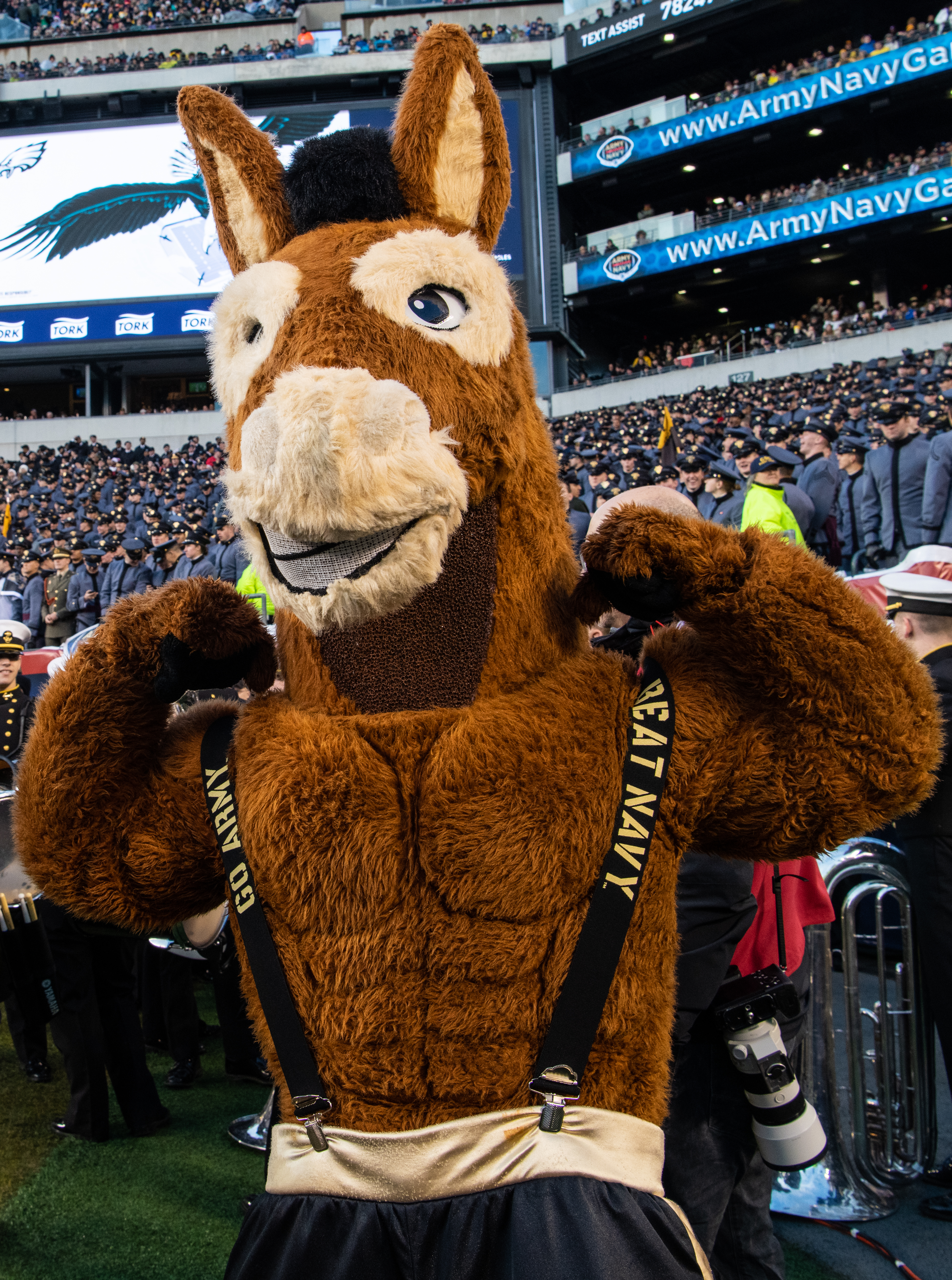
Costumed mascot

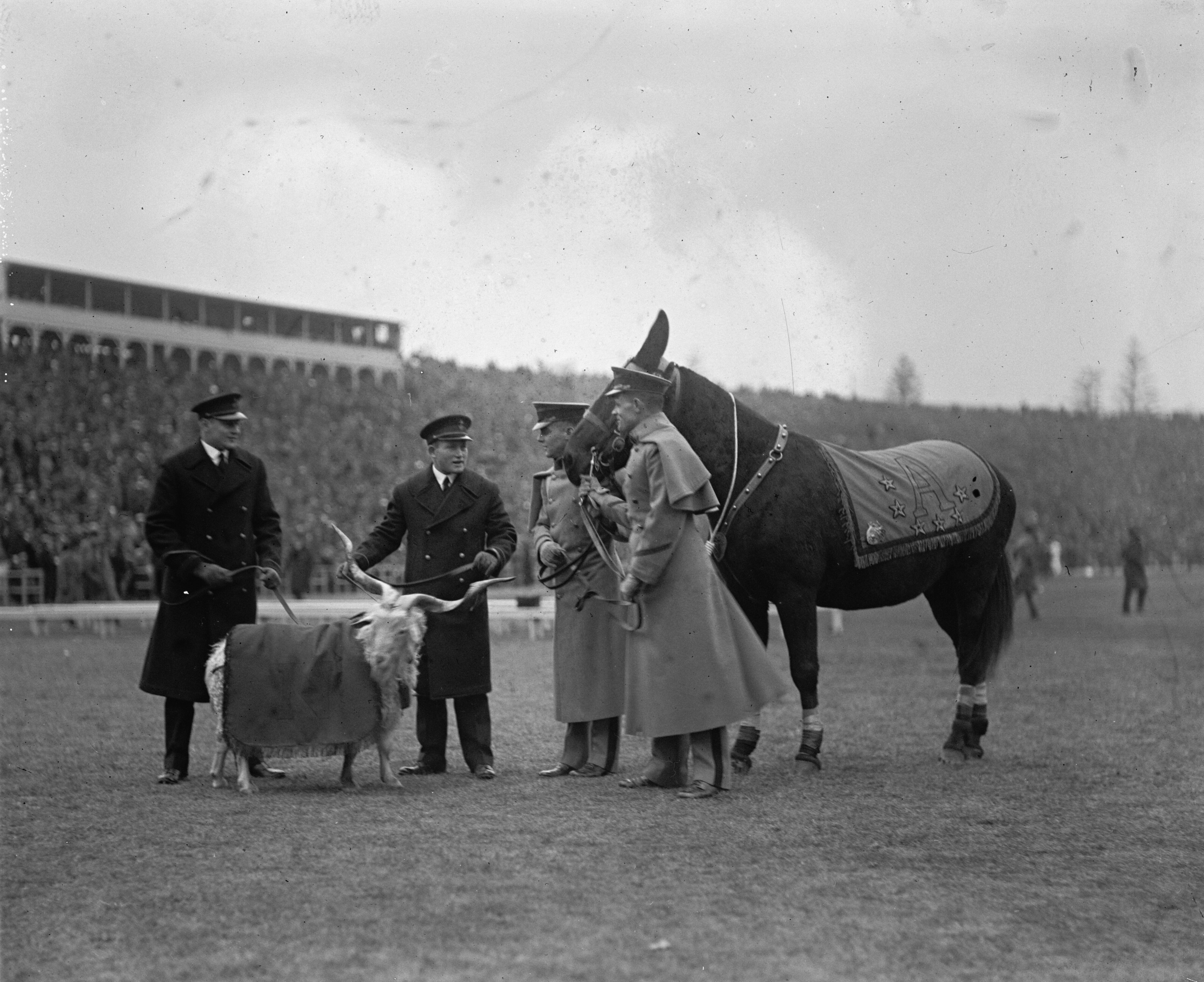
Bill the Goat and Army Mule at the 1924 Army–Navy Game

The tradition of mules as mascots for Army dates back to 1899, when an officer at the Philadelphia Quartermaster Depot decided that the team needed a mascot to counter the Navy goat. Mules were an obvious choice, as they were used as haulers for Army gear for generations. Not much is known about the "official" mules until 1936, when Mr. Jackson (named for Thomas J. "Stonewall" Jackson), a former Army pack mule, arrived from Front Royal, Virginia. He served for twelve years, presiding over two national championship teams. Starting with Mr. Jackson, there have been seventeen "official" Army mules, only one, Buckshot, being female. The current Mule Corps are:

- Ranger III (formerly known as Jack): Ranger III, one of the Army Mules, has been on campus since 2011. He was trained by MAJ Anne Hessinger, an Army veterinarian who served at West Point in 2003–2006. Named, like his predecessor, for the 75th Ranger Regiment and all Rangers past and present, Ranger III came to the academy in 2011 as a gift of Steve Townes, class of 1975. He stands at 16.2 hands (66 inches, 168 cm) and is the son of a Percheron mare.
- Stryker (formerly known as Abe): Stryker is the half-brother of Ranger III. He was also trained by MAJ Anne Hessinger and gifted by Steve Townes. Stryker stands at a height slightly shorter than his brother.
- Paladin (formerly known as Apache and Rocky): The newest member of the group, joined in February 2016, and is also a gift of Steve Townes. Paladin stands about two hands shorter than the half-brothers, and is half thoroughbred rather than Percheron.

The Army Mules are trained by cadet Mule Riders, a part of the Spirit Support Activity of the U.S. Corps of Cadets. The current Army Mule Riders are: Cadet Garrett Dolan, 2021, Cadet Sarah Traynor, 2022, Cadet Kyle Kass, 2023, and Cadet Benjamin Bennett, 2024. Together they are present at many of West Point's athletic events, parades, and other ceremonial activities.

The Mules serve not only as West Point's mascot, but also as the mascot for the entire United States Army.

Former Army Mules
Name	Years	Donor	Notes
Mr. Jackson	1936–1948	Remount Station, Front Royal, Virginia	First "official" mule
Pancho	1939–1958	Ecuador	Also known as "Skippy", a gift of Colon Alfaro, the Ecuadorian Ambassador to the US and father to two members of the class of 1939
Hannibal I	1948–1964	U.S. Army (a six-year veteran)	Originally named "Bud" and renamed by the Corps of Cadets, Hannibal I died in 1964 after being kicked by another mule
K.C. MO	1957–1969	Mr. James M. Parker of Kansas City, Missouri	Known to throw his riders; retired early
Trotter	1957–1972	U.S. Army 35th Quartermaster Pack Unit, Fort Carson, Colorado	Named for his ability to trot long distances
Hannibal II	1964–1980	The Hannibal, Missouri Chamber of Commerce	Originally named "Jack"
Buckshot	1964–1986	A gift of the United States Air Force Academy	Exchanged for a ceremonial sword
Spartacus	1973–1994	Governor Warren E. Hearnes of Missouri	Nicknamed "Frosty" for his white muzzle
Ranger I	1978–1995	Ranger Association of World War II	Son of a Percheron draft mare and a Spanish jack
Black Jack	1985–1989	Senator Albert Gore, Sr. of Tennessee	Died of cancer two days before the 1989 Army-Navy Game
Traveler	1990–2002	Anonymous	Also known as "Dan," known for his ability to do fancy steps
Trooper	1990–2002	Mr. Bob Griffin of Houston, Texas	Also known as "Ernie," known for his advanced training
Raider	1995–2011	Quincy (IL) Notre Dame High School Foundation	Formerly known as "Joker." Known for his reddish color, white star on his forehead, calm demeanor and high level of sociability. Son of a Tennessee Walker mare
Ranger II	2002–2011	Steven Townes, Class of 1975	Also known as "George," known for his small size and shy character. Son of a Quarter Horse mare
General Scott	2002–2011	Steven Townes, Class of 1975	Also known as "Scotty." Known for his large size, beautiful dark coat and skittish tendencies. He is named for Lt. Gen. (Ret.) Willard W. Scott Jr., a former USMA Superintendent and Army Mule supporter. Son of a Clydesdale mare
Paladin	Present	Steven Townes, Class of 1975	formerly known as Jack. The son of a Percheron mare.
Stryker	Present	Steven Townes, Class of 1975	formerly known as Abe. The half-brother of Ranger III
Ranger III	Present	Steven Townes, Class of 1975	formerly known as Apache and Rocky. The newest member of the group, joined in February 2016.
