= The Corps (song) =

Poetic hymn

"The Corps"
Bishop H.S. Shipman's "The Corps" is considered the second most important song at the United States Military Academy behind the Alma Mater.

"The Corps" is a poetic hymn associated with the United States Military Academy. It is second in importance to only the Academy's Alma Mater. The words were written by West Point Chaplain, Bishop H.S. Shipman, around 1902. The accompanying music was composed in 1910 specially for the ceremonial closing of the Old Cadet Chapel and opening of the new Cadet Chapel. "The Corps" was first sung on the steps of the Cadet Chapel on 12 June 1910, and became part of the graduation ceremony starting in 1911. Today, "The Corps" is typically sung by the Cadet Glee Club (West Point's choir) in companion to the Alma Mater at alumni gatherings, graduation, memorial ceremonies and funerals.

== Lyrics ==
The original words to The Corps, as written in 1902 are:

THE CORPS! THE CORPS! THE CORPS!

The Corps, bareheaded, salute it, with eyes up, thanking our God.
That we of the Corps are treading, where they of the Corps have trod.
They are here in ghostly assemblage. The men of the Corps long dead.
And our hearts are standing attention, while we wait for their passing tread.
We Sons of today, we salute you. You Sons of an earlier day;
We follow, close order, behind you, where you have pointed the way;
The long gray line of us stretches, thro' the years of a century told
And the last man feels to his marrow, the grip of your far off hold.
Grip hands with us now though we see not, grip hands with us strengthen our hearts.
As the long line stiffens and straightens with the thrill that your presence imparts.
Grip hands tho' it be from the shadows. While we swear, as you did of yore.

Or living, or dying, to honor, the Corps, and the Corps, and the Corps.

=== Change of gender-specific lyrics ===
In 2008, the superintendent of the United States Military Academy, LTG Franklin L. Hagenbeck, ordered a change to the lyrics of The Corps and the Alma Mater. The change was to remove gender-specific language in the songs, which were written when the Academy only admitted male cadets. LTG Hagenbeck wrote a letter to the Association of Graduates explaining the reasoning for his decision.

The changes are:

- FROM: "The men of the Corps long dead" TO: "The ranks of the Corps long dead"
- FROM: "We sons of today, we salute you" TO: "The Corps of today, we salute you"
- FROM: "You sons of an earlier day" TO: The Corps of an earlier day"
- FROM: "And the last man feels to his marrow" TO: "And the last one feels to the marrow"
