= 2009 NCAA Bowling Championship =

Tournament details
- Dates: April 2009
- Teams: 8

Final positions
- Champions: Nebraska (3rd title)
- Runners-up: Central Missouri (3rd title match)

Tournament statistics
- Matches played: 15
- Attendance: 1,236 (82 per match)

Awards
- Best player: Cassandra Leuthold, Nebraska

The 2009 NCAA Bowling Championship was the sixth annual tournament to determine the national champion of women's NCAA collegiate ten-pin bowling. The tournament was played at Super Bowl Lanes in Canton, Michigan during April 2009.

Nebraska defeated Central Missouri in the championship match, 4 games to 1, to win their third national title.

== Qualification ==
Since there is only one national collegiate championship for women's bowling, all NCAA bowling programs (whether from Division I, Division II, or Division III) were eligible. A total of 8 teams were invited to contest this championship, which consisted of a modified double-elimination style tournament.

Team	Appearance	Previous
Arkansas State	2nd	2008
Central Missouri	5th	2008
Delaware State	1st	Never
Maryland–Eastern Shore	6th	2008
Fairleigh Dickinson	5th	2007
Nebraska	6th	2008
New Jersey City	6th	2008
Vanderbilt	4th	2008

== Tournament bracket ==
- Site: Super Bowl Lanes, Canton, Michigan

Rounds 1–2	Rounds 2–3
Nebraska	4
Arkansas State	3
Nebraska	1
F. Dickinson	4
F. Dickinson	4(1)
Vanderbilt	2(1)
Upper Bracket
Arkansas State	3
Vanderbilt	4	Central Missouri	4
Vanderbilt	0
Central Missouri	4
UMES	0
Central Missouri	1
Delaware State	4
Delaware State	4
New Jersey City	3
Lower Bracket
UMES	1(1)
New Jersey City	4(1)	Nebraska	4
New Jersey City	3

Rounds 4–5
F. Dickinson	2	3
Central Missouri	4	4
Delaware State	2	2
Nebraska	4	4

Championship
Central Missouri	1
Nebraska	4

== All-tournament team ==
- Cassandra Leuthold, Nebraska
- Valerie Calberry, Nebraska
- Theresa Christopher, Central Missouri
- Jazmyne Hefflefinger, Delaware State
- Sara Litteral, Fairleigh Dickinson
- Erica Perez, Fairleigh Dickinson
