= 2013 NCAA Bowling Championship =

Tournament details
- Dates: April 11–13, 2013
- Teams: 8

Final positions
- Champions: Nebraska (4th title)
- Runners-up: Vanderbilt (3rd title match)

Tournament statistics
- Matches played: 14
- Attendance: 995 (71 per match)

Awards
- Best player: Liz Kuhlkin (Nebraska)

The 2013 NCAA Bowling Championship was the 10th annual tournament to determine the national champion of women's NCAA collegiate ten-pin bowling. The tournament was played at Freeway Lanes in Canton, Michigan from April 11–13, 2013.

Nebraska defeated Vanderbilt in the championship match, 4½ games to 2½ (211–199, 186–197, 156–169, 190–190, 196–189, 202–182, 246–200), to win their fourth national title. The Cornhuskers were coached by Bill Straub.

Nebraska's Liz Kuhlkin was named the tournament's Most Outstanding Player. Kuhlkin, along with four other bowlers, also comprised the All Tournament Team.

== Qualification ==
Since there is only one national collegiate championship for women's bowling, all NCAA bowling programs (whether from Division I, Division II, or Division III) were eligible. A total of 8 teams were given at-large bids for this championship, which consisted of a modified double-elimination style tournament.

| Team | Appearance | Previous |
|---|---|---|
| Arkansas State | 6th | 2012 |
| Central Missouri | 10th | 2012 |
| Fairleigh Dickinson | 9th | 2012 |
| Maryland–Eastern Shore | 10th | 2012 |
| Nebraska | 10th | 2012 |
| Sam Houston State | 2nd | 2011 |
| Vanderbilt | 8th | 2012 |
| Wisconsin–Whitewater | 1st | Never |

== Tournament bracket ==
- Site: Super Bowl Lanes, Canton, Michigan
- Host: Detroit Titans

Rounds 1–2; April 12 | Rounds 2–3; April 12
3 | Nebraska | 4
1 | Central Missouri | 1
3 | Nebraska | 4
2 | UMES | 1
2 | UMES | 4
7 | UW–Whitewater | 2
Upper Bracket
1 | Central Missouri | 4
7 | UW–Whitewater | 1 | 4 | Arkansas State | 4
1 | Central Missouri | 0
4 | Arkansas State | 4
6 | Sam Houston State | 0
4 | Arkansas State | 3
5 | Vanderbilt | 4
5 | Vanderbilt | 4
8 | Fairleigh Dickinson | 2
Lower Bracket
6 | Sam Houston State | 2
8 | Fairleigh Dickinson | 4 | 2 | UMES | 4
8 | Fairleigh Dickinson | 2

Rounds 4–5; April 12–13
3 | Nebraska | 4 | –
4 | Arkansas State | 1 | –
5 | Vanderbilt | 4 | –
2 | UMES | 3 | –

Championship; April 13
3 | Nebraska | 4½
5 | Vanderbilt | 2½

=== Championship Match ===
| Team | Game 1 | Game 2 | Game 3 | Game 4 | Game 5 | Game 6 | Game 7 |
|---|---|---|---|---|---|---|---|
| #3 Nebraska (4½) | 211 | 186 | 156 | 190 | 196 | 202 | 246 |
| #5 Vanderbilt (2½) | 199 | 197 | 169 | 190 | 189 | 182 | 200 |

== All-tournament team ==
- Liz Kuhlkin, Nebraska (Most Outstanding Player)
- Elise Bolton, Nebraska
- Jessica Earnest, Vanderbilt
- Amanda Labossiere, Arkansas State
- Kristie Lopez, UMES
