= List of NCAA women's bowling programs =

These collegiate women's bowling teams compete as members of the National Collegiate Athletic Association (NCAA). As of the coming 2026–27 season, 97 NCAA member schools sponsored the sport. The largest number of competing schools is found in Division I with 40. Division II has 37 and Division III has 20. Unlike in most sports for which the NCAA holds championships, one bowling championship is held, open to members of all three divisions.

Division II will have its own bowling championship starting in 2027–28.

== Current teams ==
As of the coming 2026–27 NCAA bowling season, these schools sponsor a bowling team that is recognized by the NCAA. All institutions on this list are located within the United States. Conference affiliations reflect those for bowling, and do not necessarily match the schools' primary conferences.

Institution	Teams	Location	State	Conference	Division
Adelphi	Panthers	Garden City	NY	East Coast Conference	II
Alabama A&M	Lady Bulldogs	Normal	AL	Southwestern Athletic Conference	I
Alabama State	Lady Hornets	Montgomery	AL	Southwestern Athletic Conference	I
Alvernia	Golden Wolves	Reading	PA	Allegheny Mountain Collegiate Conference	III
Arkansas State	Red Wolves	Jonesboro	AR	Conference USA	I
Augustana (IL)	Vikings	Rock Island	IL	College Conference of Illinois and Wisconsin	III
Aurora	Spartans	Aurora	IL	College Conference of Illinois and Wisconsin	III
Baldwin Wallace	Yellow Jackets	Berea	OH	Independent	III
Barton	Bulldogs	Wilson	NC	Conference Carolinas	II
Belmont Abbey	Crusaders	Belmont	NC	Conference Carolinas	II
Bowie State	Bulldogs	Bowie	MD	Central Intercollegiate Athletic Association	II
Bryant	Bulldogs	Smithfield	RI	East Coast Conference	II (Note: Reflects the conference's membership in Division II. Bryant is a full member of Division I.)
Caldwell	Cougars	Caldwell	NJ	Central Atlantic Collegiate Conference	II
Carroll	Pioneers	Waukesha	WI	College Conference of Illinois and Wisconsin	III
Carthage	Firebirds	Kenosha	WI	College Conference of Illinois and Wisconsin	III
Central Missouri	Jennies	Warrensburg	MO	Great Lakes Valley Conference	II
Chestnut Hill	Griffins	Philadelphia	PA	Central Atlantic Collegiate Conference	II
Coppin State	Eagles	Baltimore	MD	Mid-Eastern Athletic Conference	I
Daemen	Wildcats	Amherst	NY	East Coast Conference	II
Delaware State	Hornets	Dover	DE	Mid-Eastern Athletic Conference	I
Dominican (NY)	Chargers	Orangeburg	NY	Central Atlantic Collegiate Conference	II
Duquesne	Dukes	Pittsburgh	PA	NEC	I
D'Youville	Saints	Buffalo	NY	East Coast Conference	II
Edgewood	Eagles	Madison	WI	Independent	III
Elizabeth City State	Vikings	Elizabeth City	NC	Central Intercollegiate Athletic Association	II
Elmhurst	Bluejays	Elmhurst	IL	College Conference of Illinois and Wisconsin	III
Emmanuel (GA)	Lions	Franklin Springs	GA	Conference Carolinas	II
Fairleigh Dickinson	Knights	Teaneck	NJ	NEC	I
Fayetteville State	Lady Broncos	Fayetteville	NC	Central Intercollegiate Athletic Association	II
Felician	Golden Falcons	Lodi	NJ	Central Atlantic Collegiate Conference	II
Florida A&M	Lady Rattlers	Tallahassee	FL	Southwestern Athletic Conference	I
Grambling State	Tigers	Grambling	LA	Southwestern Athletic Conference	I
Hilbert	Hawks	Hamburg	NY	Allegheny Mountain Collegiate Conference	III
Holy Family	Tigers	Philadelphia	PA	Central Atlantic Collegiate Conference	II
Howard	Bison	Washington	DC	Mid-Eastern Athletic Conference	I
Illinois Wesleyan	Titans	Bloomington	IL	College Conference of Illinois and Wisconsin	III
Indianapolis	Greyhounds	Indianapolis	IN	Great Lakes Valley Conference	II
Jackson State	Lady Tigers	Jackson	MS	Southwestern Athletic Conference	I
Jacksonville State	Gamecocks	Jacksonville	AL	Conference USA	I
Johnson C. Smith	Golden Bulls	Charlotte	NC	Central Intercollegiate Athletic Association	II
Kutztown	Golden Bears	Kutztown	PA	East Coast Conference	II
La Roche	Redhawks	McCandless (Note: The La Roche campus is physically located in McCandless but has a Pittsburgh mailing address.)	PA	Allegheny Mountain Collegiate Conference	III
Lakeland	Muskies	Plymouth	WI	College Conference of Illinois and Wisconsin	III
Le Moyne	Dolphins	DeWitt (Note: The Le Moyne campus is physically located in DeWitt but has a Syracuse mailing address.)	NY	NEC	I
Lewis	Flyers	Romeoville	IL	Great Lakes Valley Conference	II
LIU	Sharks	Brooklyn/Brookville (Note: LIU has two main campuses, one in Brooklyn and the other in Brookville. The overall athletic administration is in Brookville, but many sports operate out of Brooklyn. All LIU teams are open to undergraduates at both campuses who meet NCAA eligibility requirements.)	NY	NEC	I
Livingstone	Blue Bears	Salisbury	NC	Central Intercollegiate Athletic Association	II
Louisiana Tech	Lady Techsters	Ruston	LA	Independent	I
Marian (WI)	Sabres	Fond du Lac	WI	College Conference of Illinois and Wisconsin	III
Maryland Eastern Shore	Hawks	Princess Anne (Note: UMES has a Princess Anne mailing address, but lies in unincorporated Somerset County.)	MD	Mid-Eastern Athletic Conference	I
Maryville (MO)	Saints	Town and Country (Note: The main Maryville campus is physically in Town and Country, but has a St. Louis mailing address.)	MO	Great Lakes Valley Conference	II
McKendree	Bearcats	Lebanon	IL	Great Lakes Valley Conference	II
Mercyhurst	Lakers	Erie	PA	NEC	I
Merrimack	Warriors	North Andover	MA	Independent	I
Molloy	Lions	Rockville Centre	NY	East Coast Conference	II
Monmouth	Hawks	West Long Branch	NJ	NEC	I
Morgan State	Lady Bears	Baltimore	MD	Mid-Eastern Athletic Conference	I
Mount St. Mary's	Mountaineers	Emmitsburg (Note: The Mount St. Mary's campus has an Emmitsburg mailing address, but lies in unincorporated Frederick County.)	MD	Independent	I
Nebraska	Cornhuskers	Lincoln	NE	Conference USA	I
Newman	Jets	Wichita	KS	Great Lakes Valley Conference	II
Niagara	Purple Eagles	Niagara University (Note: The Niagara campus is its own census-designated place and postal entity within the town of Lewiston.)	NY	NEC	I
Norfolk State	Spartans	Norfolk	VA	Mid-Eastern Athletic Conference	I
North Carolina A&T	Aggies	Greensboro	NC	Mid-Eastern Athletic Conference	I
Oklahoma Christian	Lady Eagles	Edmond	OK	Great Lakes Valley Conference	II
Penn State Behrend	Lions	Erie	PA	Allegheny Mountain Collegiate Conference	III
Pitt–Bradford	Panthers	Bradford	PA	Allegheny Mountain Collegiate Conference	III
Pitt–Greensburg	Bobcats	Greensburg	PA	Allegheny Mountain Collegiate Conference	III
Prairie View A&M	Panthers	Prairie View	TX	Southwestern Athletic Conference	I
Quincy	Hawks	Quincy	IL	Great Lakes Valley Conference	II
Roberts Wesleyan	Redhawks	North Chili (Note: The Roberts Wesleyan campus is physically located in North Chili but has a Rochester mailing address.)	NY	East Coast Conference	II
Rockford	Regents	Rockford	IL	Independent	III
Sacred Heart	Pioneers	Fairfield	CT	Conference USA	I
Saint Anselm	Hawks	Manchester	NH	East Coast Conference (Note: Saint Anselm has announced it will start a transition to Division III in 2027–28 as a new member of the New England Women's and Men's Athletic Conference, which does not sponsor bowling. The school has yet to announce a bowling affiliation beyond the 2026–27 season.)	II
St. Thomas Aquinas	Spartans	Sparkill	NY	East Coast Conference	II
Saint Vincent	Bearcats	Latrobe	PA	Allegheny Mountain Collegiate Conference	III
Sam Houston	Bearkats	Huntsville	TX	Conference USA	I
Shaw	Bears	Raleigh	NC	Central Intercollegiate Athletic Association	II
Shawnee State	Bears	Portsmouth	OH	TBA	II
Southern	Lady Jaguars	Baton Rouge	LA	Southwestern Athletic Conference	I
Texas Southern	Tigers	Houston	TX	Southwestern Athletic Conference	I
Thomas More	Saints	Crestview Hills	KY	Conference Carolinas (Note: Conference Carolinas and this institution's primary conference, the Great Midwest Athletic Conference, operate a joint bowling championship. The NCAA considers all schools in the alliance to be CC bowling members.)	II
Tulane	Green Wave	New Orleans	LA	Conference USA	I
UAB	Blazers	Birmingham	AL	Mid-Eastern Athletic Conference	I
Ursuline	Arrows	Pepper Pike	OH	Conference Carolinas	II
Valparaiso	Beacons	Valparaiso	IN	Conference USA	I
Vanderbilt	Commodores	Nashville	TN	Conference USA	I
Virginia State	Trojans	Ettrick (Note: The Virginia State campus is physically located in Ettrick but has a Petersburg mailing address.)	VA	Central Intercollegiate Athletic Association	II
Virginia Union	Panthers	Richmond	VA	Central Intercollegiate Athletic Association	II
Wagner	Seahawks	Staten Island	NY	NEC	I
Walsh	Cavaliers	North Canton	OH	Conference Carolinas	II
Western Illinois	Leathernecks	Macomb	IL	Independent	I
Wichita State	Shockers	Wichita	KS	Conference USA	I
William Smith	Herons	Geneva	NY	Allegheny Mountain Collegiate Conference	III
Wilmington	Wildcats	New Castle	DE	Central Atlantic Collegiate Conference	II
Wisconsin–Whitewater	Warhawks	Whitewater	WI	Independent	III
Wright State	Raiders	Fairborn (Note: The Wright State campus is physically located in Fairborn but has a Dayton mailing address.)	OH	Conference USA	I
Youngstown State	Penguins	Youngstown	OH	Conference USA	I

== Future teams ==
Institution	Teams	Location	State	Conference	Div.	First season
Murray State	Racers	Murray	Kentucky	TBA	I	2027–28
Texas A&M–Texarkana	Eagles	Texarkana	Texas	TBA (Note: Texas A&M–Texarkana, which currently sponsors bowling for both men and women, will start a transition from the NAIA to NCAA Division II in July 2027.)	II	2027–28
