= 2012 NCAA Bowling Championship =

Tournament details
- Dates: April 13–14, 2012
- Teams: 8

Final positions
- Champions: Maryland Eastern Shore (3rd title)
- Runners-up: Fairleigh Dickinson (3rd title match)

Tournament statistics
- Matches played: 14
- Attendance: 938 (67 per match)

Awards
- Best player: T'nia Falbo (Maryland Eastern Shore)

The 2012 NCAA Bowling Championship was the ninth annual tournament to determine the national champion of women's NCAA collegiate ten-pin bowling. The tournament was played at Freeway Lanes in Wickliffe, Ohio from April 13–14, 2012.

Maryland Eastern Shore defeated Fairleigh Dickinson in the championship match, 4 games to 2 (222–204, 236–215, 167–249, 208–168, 170–223, 203–176), to win their third, and second consecutive, national title. The Hawks were coached by Kristina Frahm, who also the Most Outstanding Player of UMES' 2011 championship team. This would draw Maryland Eastern Shore even with Nebraska at 3 national titles.

Maryland Eastern Shore's T'nia Falbo was named the tournament's Most Outstanding Player. Falbo, along with four other bowlers, also comprised the All Tournament Team.

== Qualification ==
Since there is only one national collegiate championship for women's bowling, all NCAA bowling programs (whether from Division I, Division II, or Division III) were eligible. A total of 8 teams were invited to contest this championship, which consisted of a modified double-elimination style tournament.

Team	Appearance	Previous
Arkansas State	5th	2011
Central Missouri	9th	2011
Fairleigh Dickinson	8th	2011
Maryland–Eastern Shore	9th	2011
Nebraska	9th	2011
Sacred Heart	5th	2008
Valparaiso	1st	Never
Vanderbilt	7th	2011

== Tournament bracket ==
- Site: Freeway Lanes, Wickliffe, Ohio
- Host: Mid-American Conference

Rounds 1–2; April 13	Rounds 2–3; April 13
1	Vanderbilt	4
8	Valparaiso	1
1	Vanderbilt	1½
5	UMES	4½
5	UMES	4
4	Sacred Heart	3
Upper Bracket
8	Valparaiso	4
4	Sacred Heart	3	2	Nebraska	4
8	Valparaiso	3
3	Fairleigh Dickinson	4
6	Arkansas State	1
3	Fairleigh Dickinson	4
2	Nebraska	3
7	Central Missouri	0
2	Nebraska	4
Lower Bracket
6	Arkansas State	4
7	Central Missouri	3	1	Vanderbilt	4
6	Arkansas State	2

Rounds 4–5; April 13–14
5	UMES	4	–
2	Nebraska	1	–
3	Fairleigh Dickinson	0	4
1	Vanderbilt	4	3

Championship; April 14
5	UMES	4
3	Fairleigh Dickinson	2

=== Championship Match ===
Team	Game 1	Game 2	Game 3	Game 4	Game 5	Game 6
#5 Maryland Eastern Shore (4)	222	236	167	208	170	203
#3 Fairleigh Dickinson (2)	204	215	249	168	223	176

== All-tournament team ==
- T'nia Falbo, Maryland Eastern Shore (Most Outstanding Player)
- Joely Carrillo, Fairleigh Dickinson
- Natalie Cortese, Valparaiso
- Kayla Johnson, Nebraska
- Amanda LaBossiere, Arkansas State
