= 2010 NCAA Bowling Championship =

Tournament details
- Dates: April 2010
- Teams: 8

Final positions
- Champions: Fairleigh Dickinson (2nd title)
- Runners-up: Nebraska (4th title match)

Tournament statistics
- Matches played: 13
- Attendance: 1,286 (99 per match)

Awards
- Best player: Danielle McEwan (Fairleigh Dickinson)

The 2010 NCAA Bowling Championship was the seventh annual tournament to determine the national champion of women's NCAA collegiate ten-pin bowling. The tournament was played at Carolier Brunswick Zone in North Brunswick, New Jersey during April 2009.

Fairleigh Dickinson defeated Nebraska in the championship match, 4 games to 3 (209–167, 202–222, 203–213, 229–192, 201–222, 230–190, 208–174), to win their second national title. The Knights were coached by Mike LoPresti.

FDU's Danielle McEwan was named the tournament's Most Outstanding Player. McEwan, along with four other bowlers, also comprised the All Tournament Team.

This would be the first time two former champions faced off in the finals.

== Qualification ==
Since there is only one national collegiate championship for women's bowling, all NCAA bowling programs (whether from Division I, Division II, or Division III) were eligible. A total of 8 teams were invited to contest this championship, which consisted of a modified double-elimination style tournament.

Team	Appearance	Previous
Arkansas State	3rd	2009
Central Missouri	6th	2009
Delaware State	2nd	2009
Maryland–Eastern Shore	7th	2009
Fairleigh Dickinson	6th	2009
Nebraska	7th	2009
New Jersey City	7th	2009
Vanderbilt	5th	2009

== Tournament bracket ==
- Site: Carolier Brunswick Zone, North Brunswick, New Jersey

Rounds 1–2	Rounds 2–3
Nebraska	4
Central Missouri	1
Nebraska	2
Fairleigh Dickinson	4
Fairleigh Dickinson	4
New Jersey City	2
Upper Bracket
Central Missouri	0(1)
New Jersey City	4(1)	UMES	1
New Jersey City	4
UMES	4
Vanderbilt	3
UMES	2
Arkansas State	4
Arkansas State	4
Delaware State	0
Lower Bracket
Vanderbilt	4
Delaware State	2	Nebraska	4
Vanderbilt	1

Rounds 4–5
Fairleigh Dickinson	4
New Jersey City	2
Arkansas State	2
Nebraska	4

Championship
Fairleigh Dickinson	4
Nebraska	3

== All-tournament team ==
- Danielle McEwan, Fairleigh Dickinson (Most Outstanding Player)
- Cassandra Leuthold, Nebraska
- Jenn Marmo, New Jersey City
- Erica Perez, Fairleigh Dickinson
- Samantha Santoro, Arkansas State
