= 2004 NCAA Bowling Championship =

Tournament details
- Dates: April 2004
- Teams: 8

Final positions
- Champions: Nebraska (1st title)
- Runners-up: Central Missouri State (1st title match)

Tournament statistics
- Matches played: 15
- Attendance: 439 (29 per match)

The 2004 NCAA Bowling Championship was the first annual tournament to determine the national champion of women's NCAA collegiate ten-pin bowling. The tournament was played at Emerald Bowl in Houston, Texas during April 2004.

Nebraska defeated Central Missouri State in the championship match, 4 games to 2, to win their first national title. The Cornhuskers were coached by Bill Straub.

The awards for Most outstanding bowler and All-tournament team were not given out until 2005.

== Qualification ==
Since there is only one national collegiate championship for women's bowling, all NCAA bowling programs (whether from Division I, Division II, or Division III) were eligible. A total of 8 teams were invited to contest the inaugural championship.

Team	Appearance	Previous
Central Missouri State	1st	Never
Fairleigh Dickinson	1st	Never
Maryland–Eastern Shore	1st	Never
Nebraska	1st	Never
New Jersey City	1st	Never
Sacred Heart	1st	Never
Southern	1st	Never
Winston-Salem State	1st	Never

== Tournament bracket ==
- Site: Houston, Texas

Round 1	Round 2	Round 3–4	Rounds 6–7; April 10
C. Missouri State	4
Winston-Salem State	1
C. Missouri State	4
Fairleigh Dickinson	3
Fairleigh Dickinson	4
Southern	3
C. Missouri State	4
Nebraska	3
Sacred Heart	4
New Jersey City	0
Sacred Heart	2
Nebraska	4
Nebraska	4
UMES	3	C. Missouri State	2	2
Nebraska	4	4
Lower round 1	Lower round 2	Lower round 3	Lower final
Fairleigh Dickinson	4
Winston-Salem State	0	Southern	1	Nebraska	4
Southern	4	Fairleigh Dickinson	1	New Jersey City	3
New Jersey City	4
Sacred Heart	1
New Jersey City	4	New Jersey City	4
UMES	0

== See also ==
- Pre–NCAA Women's Bowling Championship (United States Bowling Congress)
