= 2026 NCAA Bowling Championship =

Collegiate bowling championship tournament

Tournament details
- Dates: April 10–11, 2026
- Teams: 19

Final positions
- Champions: Jacksonville State (2nd title)
- Runners-up: Wichita State (1st title match)

The 2026 NCAA Bowling Championship was the 22nd edition of the NCAA Bowling Championship, the annual tournament to determine the national champion of women's NCAA collegiate ten-pin bowling. The finals were hosted by the Mid-American Conference (MAC) and played at the Yorktown Lanes in Parma Heights, Ohio from April 10 to 11, 2026. The championship game was streamed live on ESPNU. Jacksonville State defeated Wichita State in the championship game to win its second title.

== Format ==
The 2026 championship featured a 19-team format, with 4 regionals. One regionals had four teams, while three had five, with play-in matches between Carroll and Fayetteville State in Lansing, Michigan, Dominican (NY) and Alabama A&M in Rochester, New York, and Belmont Abbey and Saint Vincent in Pittsburgh, Pennsylvania. Each region had one winner who would go on to play in a four-team tournament for the national championship. The 2026 pre-determined regional locations were as follows:

- Arlington, Texas
- Lansing, Michigan
- Rochester, New York
- Pittsburgh, Pennsylvania

Each regional was played as a double-elimination tournament, except for the three play-in matches. All regional matches, except for what the NCAA calls "if necessary regional finals", were best-of-three matches bowled in the following order: five-person team, Baker total pinfall, Baker best-of-seven match play. Any "if necessary regional final" was Baker best-of-seven. Regional winners advanced to the championship event, which was also double-elimination. All matches were bowled under the standard format for regionals (best-of-three matches using specified formats in a specific order) except the championship final, which was Baker best-of-seven.

== Qualification ==
Since there is only one national collegiate championship for women's bowling, all NCAA bowling programs (whether from Division I, Division II, or Division III) were eligible. A total of 19 teams competed in the double-elimination tournament, with 11 conference champions receiving automatic bids and eight teams receiving at-large bids. The teams were revealed in a selection show on March 25, 2026.

=== Bids ===
There were 19 teams selected for the tournament - 11 were selected automatically as conference champions, while another eight were selected at-large. The top four teams in the tournament were seeded and assigned to separate regions; they were the only teams seeded for this tournament.

Conference USA (CUSA) had the most bids of any conference with eight, while the Great Lakes Valley Conference (GLVC) had two. The Allegheny Mountain Collegiate Conference (AMCC), Central Atlantic Collegiate Conference (CACC), College Conference of Illinois and Wisconsin (CCIW), Central Intercollegiate Athletic Association (CIAA), East Coast Conference (ECC), Conference Carolinas/Great Midwest Athletic Conference (G-MAC), Mid-Eastern Athletic Conference (MEAC), Northeast Conference (NEC), and Southwestern Athletic Conference (SWAC) sent only their conference tournament champions.

Seed	Team	Conference	Bid type	Appearance	Last
1	Jacksonville State	CUSA	Automatic	3rd	2025
2	Vanderbilt	CUSA	At-large	20th	2025
3	Arkansas State	CUSA	At-large	18th	2025
4	Louisiana Tech	CUSA	At-large	6th	2025
	Alabama A&M University	SWAC	Automatic	4th	2014
	Belmont Abbey	GMAC	Automatic	3rd	2025
	Bryant	ECC	Automatic	1st	Never
	Carroll	CCIW	Automatic	1st	Never
	Dominican (NY)	CACC	Automatic	1st	Never
	Duquesne	NEC	Automatic	4th	2024
	Fayetteville State	CIAA	Automatic	5th	2025
	Maryville	GLVC	At-large	4th	2025
	Nebraska	CUSA	At-large	22nd	2025
	Newman	GLVC	Automatic	1st	Never
	North Carolina A&T	MEAC	Automatic	8th	2025
	Saint Vincent	AMCC	Automatic	2nd	2025
	Sam Houston	CUSA	At-large	14th	2025
	Wichita State	CUSA	At-large	2nd	2025
	Youngstown State	CUSA	At-large	6th	2025

== Tournament bracket ==
All regions were double-elimination, except for the finals, which was double-elimination before a single Baker best-of-7 championship match.

=== Lansing Regional ===
==== Play-in ====
Play-in match
Carroll	2
Fayetteville State	1

==== Bracket ====
First round Consolation first round
1	Jacksonville State	2
Carroll	0
Winner's bracket
Youngstown State	0
North Carolina A&T	2
Carroll	1
Youngstown State	2
Loser's bracket

Second round Consolation second round
1	Jacksonville State	2
North Carolina A&T	0
Youngstown State	0
North Carolina A&T	2

Regional final
1	Jacksonville State	2	-
North Carolina A&T	0	-

=== Rochester Regional ===
==== Play-in ====
Play-in match
Dominican (NY)	2
Alabama A&M	0

==== Bracket ====
First round Consolation first round
2	Vanderbilt	2
Dominican (NY)	0
Winner's bracket
Maryville	1
Sam Houston	2
Dominican (NY)	0
Maryville	2
Loser's bracket

Second round Consolation second round
2	Vanderbilt	2
Sam Houston	1
Maryville	2
Sam Houston	1

Regional final
2	Vanderbilt	1	4
Maryville	2	0

=== Pittsburgh Regional ===
==== Play-in ====
Play-in match
Saint Vincent	1
Belmont Abbey	2

==== Bracket ====
First round Consolation first round
3	Arkansas State	2
Belmont Abbey	0
Winner's bracket
Nebraska	2
Duquesne	1
Belmont Abbey	2
Duquesne	0
Loser's bracket

Second round Consolation second round
3	Arkansas State	2
Nebraska	0
Duquesne	0
Nebraska	2

Regional final
3	Arkansas State	2	-
Nebraska	1	-

=== Arlington Regional ===
First round Consolation first round
4	Louisiana Tech	2
Bryant	1
Winner's bracket
Wichita State	1
Newman	2
Bryant	0
Wichita State	2
Loser's bracket

Second round Consolation second round
4	Louisiana Tech	2
Newman	0
Wichita State	2
Newman	0

Regional final
4	Louisiana Tech	1	0
Wichita State	2	4

=== Finals ===
==== Parma Heights, Ohio ====
First round Consolation first round
1	Jacksonville State	2
Wichita State	0
Winner's bracket
2	Vanderbilt	2
3	Arkansas State	0
Wichita State	2
2	Arkansas State	0
Loser's bracket

Second round Consolation second round
1	Jacksonville State	2
2	Vanderbilt	0
Wichita State	2
2	Vanderbilt	1

Championship final
1	Jacksonville State	4
Wichita State	1
