= List of NCAA Women's Bowling Baker 300 Games =

The Baker format in Ten-pin bowling is the cornerstone of team play because each player contributes frames to a single game. A single player on a 5-person team would bowl frames 1 & 6, 2 & 7, etc. To bowl a perfect Baker 300, all 5 players have to throw two strikes each and the final bowler, or "anchor", having to throw the two fill frames in the 10th for a total of four. Only a handful of Baker 300 games have been shot which is made more difficult as games in NCAA bowling are played on sport compliant patterns.

The following list records the NCAA Baker 300 games shot to date:

Number	Team	Date	Tournament	Players	Ref
1	Maryland Eastern Shore	April 9, 2004	2004 NCAA Bowling Championship	Megan Raymond, Maryetta Lewis, Victoria Gay and 2 others	
2	Vanderbilt	April 12, 2007	2007 NCAA Bowling Championship	Michelle Peloquin, Kaitlin Reynolds, Karen Grygiel, Mandy Kiely, Josie Earnest	
3	Adelphi	March 9, 2008 (vs Fairleigh Dickinson)	ECAC Championship	Cristina Reale, Dianna Molenko, Michelle Montgoris, Kristin Hayes, Danielle Locurto	
4	Vanderbilt (2)	March 20, 2011 (vs Central Missouri) (Final 5 frames of Baker 300)	Music City Classic	Sarah O'Brien, Amanda Halter, Jessica Earnest, Brittni Hamilton, Samantha Hesley	
5	Fairleigh Dickinson	November 16, 2012 (vs Norfolk State)	Eastern Shore Hawk Classic	**Nicolette Sarin**, **Michelle Hunzaker**, Abigail Aubart, **Liat Vizenfeld**, Danielle McEwan	
6	Maryland Eastern Shore (2)	January 27, 2013 (vs Vanderbilt)	Kutztown Invitational	Kristie Lopez, Valentina Collazos, **Mariana Alvarado**, Anggie Ramirez, T'Nia Falbo	'
7	Central Missouri	March 3, 2013 (vs Wisconsin-Whitewater) (UCM Jennies Baker 300)	Central Missouri Women's Invitational	Mary Wells, Kelli Schroeder, Larissa Lantto, Kara Richard, Natalie Jimenez	
8	Fairleigh Dickinson (2)	January 24, 2014 (vs Norfolk State) (USBC Video)	Kutztown Invitational	Morgan Brown, **Nicolette Sarin**, **Michelle Hunzaker**, Melanie Hannon, **Liat Vizenfeld**	
9	LIU Brooklyn	January 26, 2014 (vs Monmouth University)	Kutztown Invitational	Brittany Hart and 4 others	
10	Nebraska	March 9, 2014 (vs Wisconsin-Whitewater) (USBC Video)	Music City Classic	Bethany Hedley, Andrea Ruiz, Liz Kuhlkin and 2 others	
11	Vanderbilt (3)	March 9, 2014 (vs Arkansas State) (USBC Video)	Music City Classic	Tori Ferris, Giselle Poss, **Natalie Goodman**, **Nicole Mosesso**, **Robyn Renslow**	
12	Vanderbilt (4)	November 7, 2014 (vs Prairie View A&M)	Crusader Classic	Amanda Fry, **Nicole Mosesso**, Rebecca Reguero, **Natalie Goodman**, **Robyn Renslow**	
13	Maryland Eastern Shore (3)	January 25, 2015 (vs Wisconsin-Whitewater)	Kutztown Invitational	Melanie Copey, Victoria Jones, Valerie Riggin, Tatiana Munoz, **Mariana Alvarado**	
14	Nebraska (2)	November 11, 2016 (vs Lincoln University (MO))	UWW Warhawk Classic	Meghan Straub, Briana Zaberek, Kelly Belzeski, Gazmine Mason, Julia Bond	
15	Sam Houston	November 5, 2017 (vs Stephen F. Austin)	Track Kat Klash	Hayley Connelly, Madysen Keller, Taryn Gray, Stephanie Zavala, Amber Macleod	
16	Vanderbilt (5)	January 19, 2018 (vs. Saint Francis (PA))	Kutztown Invitational	Bryanna Leyen, Kelsey Abrahamsen, Jordan Newham, Kristin Quah, Maria Bulanova	
17	Saint Francis (PA)	February 8, 2019 (vs. LIU-Post)	KU Golden Bear Classic	Hannah Schoeppner, Kristen Battles, Amanda Balas, Haley Carroll, Sarah Littleton	
18	Nebraska (3)	November 17, 2019 (vs. Sam Houston)	SFA Ladyjack Hammer Classic	Allison Morris, Michelle Guarro, Cassidy Ray, Leah Glazer, Raquel Glazer	
19	Louisiana Tech	April 7, 2021 (vs. Sam Houston)	2021 NCAA National Championship	Kaitlyn Eder, Ashley Channell, Lindsay Manning, Emily Rettig, Allie Leiendecker	
20	Youngstown State	February 25, 2022 (vs. Valparaiso)	University of Nebraska Big Red Invitational	Lyndsay Ennis, **Kirsten Moore**, **Madyson Marx**, **Jade Cote**, Emma Dockery	
21	McKendree	March 26, 2022 (vs. Maryville)	2022 GLVC Women's Bowling Championship Tournament	Britaney Myers, **Maranda Pattison**, **Isabel Allen**, **Rebecca Hagerman**, Hope Gramly	
22	Vanderbilt (6)	November 11, 2022 (vs. Maryville)	LadyJack Invitational	Mabel Cummins, **Caroline Thesier**, **Alyssa Ballard**, **Paige Peters**, **Victoria Varano**	
23	Stephen F. Austin	January 22, 2023 (vs. Maryville)	Northeast Classic	Isabel Hughes, Carlen Gattenby, Brystal Beyer, Chloe Skurzynski, Carlene Beyer	
24	Arkansas State	February 19, 2023 (vs. Sam Houston)	Mid-Winter Invitational	Karli VanDuinen, Sarah Sanes, Emma Stull, Faith Welch, Brooklyn Buchanan	
25	Jacksonville State	November 17, 2023 (vs. Duquesne)	Eastern Shore Hawk Classic	Kayla Smith, **Isabel Allen**, **Maranda Pattison**, **Rebecca Hagerman**, Crystal Elliott	
26	Duquesne	November 17, 2023 (vs. Central Missouri)	Eastern Shore Hawk Classic	Ranelle Ulanday, Morgan Brookover, Maribeth Baker, Shannon Small, Kiearra Saldi	
27	Youngstown State (2)	November 17, 2023 (vs. Fairleigh Dickinson)	Eastern Shore Hawk Classic	Megan Grams, Madison Doseck, **Kirsten Moore**, **Jade Cote**, **Madyson Marx**	
28	Vanderbilt (7)	February 18, 2024 (vs. Jacksonville State)	Mid-Winter Invitational	**Caroline Thesier**, Kailee Channell, **Alyssa Ballard**, **Paige Peters**, **Victoria Varano**	
29	Valparaiso	January 31, 2025 (vs. UIndy)	Saints Invitational	Mia Kottke, Peytin Brake, Payton Rowley, Alexis Wooley, Jen Patz	
30	Wichita State	January 18, 2026 (vs. Maryville)	Northeast Classic	Paige Wagner, Ashtyn Woods, Aleesha Oden and 2 others	
31	Oklahoma Christian	February 1, 2026 (vs. Newman)	Columbia 300 Saints Invite	Rhiannon Davis, Tori Justice, Zandria Davis and 2 others	
32	Vanderbilt (8)	April 3, 2026 (vs. Dominican (NY))	2026 NCAA Bowling Championship - Rochester Regional	Natalie Kent, **Alyssa Ballard**, Avery Domaguin, Dannielle Henderson, Katelyn Abigania	
33	Jacksonville State (2)	October 16, 2026 (vs. Youngstown State)	Chelsea Gilliam Penguin Classic	Emma Yoder, Ashlin Teves, Abbie Leiendecker, Kaitlyn Stull, Annalise O'Bryant	

- Players in bold contributed strikes in more than one Baker 300 game.
