= NCAA bowling championship =

US women's college championship

- Sport: Bowling
- Founded: 2004
- No. of teams: 95 (regular season, 2025–26); 19 (championship, 2025)
- Most recent champion: Jacksonville State (2)
- Most titles: Nebraska (6)
- Broadcaster: ESPNU
- Website: NCAA.com

The NCAA bowling championship is a women's championship in college bowling sanctioned by the National Collegiate Athletic Association (NCAA). Unlike many NCAA sports, only one National Collegiate championship is held each season with teams from Division I, Division II, and Division III competing together. Nineteen teams, eleven of them automatic qualifiers and the other eight being at-large selections, are chosen by the NCAA Bowling Committee to compete in the championship. The championship was first held in April 2004.

The most successful team is Nebraska with 6 titles in school history. Jacksonville State is the reigning champion for their 2nd title in school history, defeating Wichita State 4 games to 1 in the 2026 championship which was held at Yorktown Lanes in the Cleveland suburb of Parma Heights, Ohio.

Nebraska is the only program to qualify for all 22 NCAA Bowling Championships since the NCAA started sponsoring bowling in the 2003–04 season.

In July 2025, the Division II Management Council recommended that the division's executive board sponsor legislation that would establish a separate D-II bowling championship. This legislation was considered by the D-II membership at the 2026 NCAA convention. The Division II Championships Committee had started a feasibility study for a D-II bowling championship after the 2023–24 school year, at which time 38 D-II members sponsored the sport. Under current Division II rules, 35 members must sponsor a sport before a separate D-II championship can be established. The final legislation was approved at the 2026 NCAA convention, with the first D-II bowling championship taking place in April 2028. Current NCAA rules require that once a division-specific championship is approved for a sport that uses the National Collegiate format, two National Collegiate championships must be held before the division championship can start.

== Format ==
The collegiate bowling season runs from late October through the end of March, and the National Collegiate Women's Bowling Championship is held in April.

=== Through 2017 ===
The format for the championships from 2004 to 2017 began with qualifying rounds in which each team bowled one five-person regular team game against each of the other seven teams participating in the championship.

Teams would then be seeded for bracket play based on their qualifying rounds win–loss record and then competed in best-of-seven-games Baker matches in a double elimination tournament. In the Baker format, each of the five team members, in order, bowls one frame until a complete (10-frame) game is bowled. A Baker match tied 3½ games to 3½ games after seven games is decided by a tiebreaker, using the Modified Baker format, which takes the scoring from only frames 6 thru 10.

=== 2018 and 2019 ===
In previous years, all eight participants received at-large bids. In 2018 the NCAA Women's Bowling Committee selected a field of ten participants. Six teams are automatic qualifiers from the conferences that have been granted an automatic bid, and the other four receive at-large bids. At that time, the six conferences that fulfilled the criteria to be granted an automatic qualifier were the Division I Mid-Eastern Athletic Conference, Northeast Conference, Southland Bowling League, and Southwestern Athletic Conference, plus the Division II Central Intercollegiate Athletic Association and East Coast Conference. The ten participants were ranked and seeded based on the criteria used by the selection committee. The top six seeds automatically entered the championship bracket. The four lowest-seeded teams played in on-campus opening round matches to determine the two participants advancing to the eight-team championship bracket. To minimize travel costs, the matchups were determined by geographical proximity rather than seedings.

In 2019, the championship field expanded from 10 to 12 teams, coinciding with two new conferences fulfilling the criteria for automatic qualification—the Division II Mid-America Intercollegiate Athletics Association (MIAA) and the Division III Allegheny Mountain Collegiate Conference. Accordingly, eight conference champions received automatic bids, and the NCAA Women's Bowling Committee selected four at-large teams to fill out the 12-team field. The top four teams were seeded into the Championship bracket, while the eight remaining teams competed in four play-in matches. The winners of these matches were seeded into the eight-team championship bracket.

Qualifying rounds were eliminated in favor of a seeded double-elimination bracket. Each match within the bracket consisted of best-of-three matches using specified formats (five-person regular team matches, Baker total pinfall, and Baker match play).

The championship finals were a best-of-seven match using Baker match play rules. The tiebreaker rule used through 2017 will still apply to Baker match play in the new format.

=== 2020–2027 ===
The championship was scheduled to expand to 16 teams in 2020. The number of automatic bids was reduced by one after the MIAA bowling league disbanded at the end of the 2018–19 season. Although five schools that had participated in the final season of MIAA bowling became part of the new bowling league of the Great Lakes Valley Conference (GLVC), those schools were not in the same bowling league for a sufficient time to allow the GLVC to inherit the MIAA's automatic bid.

The 2020 tournament was intended to be the first to feature regional play. The field was to be split into four regions, each with four teams competing at predetermined sites; each of the top four seeds as chosen by the NCAA selection committee would be placed in a separate regional. Each regional was to be played as a double-elimination tournament, with the format identical to that introduced for the championship event in 2019. All regional matches, except for what the NCAA calls "if necessary regional finals", are best-of-three matches bowled in the following order: five-person team, Baker total pinfall, Baker best-of-seven match play. Any "if necessary regional final" will be Baker best-of-seven. Regional winners will advance to the championship event, which will also be double-elimination. All matches will be bowled under the standard format for regionals (best-of-three matches using specified formats in a specific order) except the championship final, which will be Baker best-of-seven.

On March 12, 2020, the NCAA announced that the 2020 tournament was canceled due to the COVID-19 pandemic.

The 2021 tournament featured six automatic berths (CIAA had its championship cancelled due to COVID-19) and ten at-large selections. This was the first tournament to feature regional play. Both regional and championship rounds were all played at one site. The 2022 tournament saw the number of automatic bids increase by two, to eight, with the GLVC champion receiving an automatic bid for its champion and the CIAA champion returning after a one-year absence. There were eight at-large selections. For the first time, regional competition took place at four predetermined regional sites - Erie, PA, Rochester, NY, Lansing, MI, and Arlington, TX, with the regional winners advancing to the championship round. The 2023 tournament saw the College Conference of Illinois & Wisconsin gain an automatic bid, bringing the total number of automatic bids to nine. Eight at-large selections and four predetermined regional sites carried over from the 2022 tournament. The 2024 tournament saw the bowling alliance between Conference Carolinas and the Great Midwest Athletic Conference gain an automatic bid, bringing the total number of automatic bids to ten. Eight at-large selections and four predetermined regional sites carried over from the 2023 tournament. The 2025 tournament saw the Central Atlantic Collegiate Conference gain an automatic bid, bringing the total number of automatic bids to eleven. Eight at-large selections and four predetermined regional sites carried over from the 2024 tournament. The 2026 tournament kept the same number of automatic bids, at-large selections, and four predetermined regional sites.

=== From 2028 ===
After the 2026–27 season, Division II members will no longer participate in the National Collegiate championship, instead holding their own championship. The format for the National Collegiate championship going forward has yet to be determined. Neither Division I nor Division III has sufficient members to hold its own championship.

== Champions ==
All schools are listed with their current athletic brand names, which do not always match those used by a school in the relevant season.

NCAA National Collegiate Bowling Championship
Year	Site	Championship						
Year	Site	Winner	Score	Runner-up	Individual Games	Most Valuable Bowler	Winning Head Coach	Ref
2004; Details	Emerald Bowl; Houston, Texas	Nebraska	4–2	Central Missouri	170–131, 160–208, 185–190, 239–150, 219–197, 215–173 (Note: Nebraska had to win two best-of-seven matchups against Central Missouri (who advanced to the finals after going undefeated in Friday's double elimination format) to win the first NCAA bowling title. Nebraska won the first match 4–2 (183–176, 168–200, 195–170, 212–212 (60–40), 168–203, 246–195) to force the winner-take-all match.)	Shannon Pluhowsky, Nebraska	Bill Straub	
2005; Details	Wekiva Lanes; Orlando, Florida	Nebraska (2)	4–2	Central Missouri	220–210, 247–266, 148–192, 205–190, 190–172, 235–184 (Note: Under the same double elimination format used in 2004, Nebraska went undefeated, winning three matches on Friday, meaning they only had to win once (out of a possible two best-of-seven matches) against Central Missouri to win the NCAA Bowling Championship. Nebraska needed only one best-of-seven match-up to win their second straight NCAA Bowling title.)	Amanda Burgoyne, Nebraska	Bill Straub (2)	
2006; Details	Emerald Bowl; Houston, Texas	Fairleigh Dickinson	4–1	Alabama A&M	209–165, 148–184, 172–165, 200–179, 196–165 (Note: Fairleigh Dickinson (only team undefeated, 3-0 after Friday's double elimination matches) needed only one best-of-seven match (out of a possible two matches) to defeat Alabama A&M.)	Lisa Friscioni, Fairleigh Dickinson	Mike LoPresti	
2007; Details	Wekiva Lanes; Apopka, Florida	Vanderbilt	4–3	Maryland Eastern Shore	167–164, 242–166, 154–202, 148–170, 224–180, 178–235, 198–150 (Note: The double elimination format was tweaked in 2007 and was last used in the 2019 championships. Under the previous double elimination format used from 2004–2006, the finalist with one loss had to defeat the undefeated finalist twice in best-of-seven matches to win the bowling championship. Beginning in 2007, two teams that win two best-of-seven matches advance to the semifinals. In the semifinals, the two undefeated teams would only need to win once out a possible two matches to advance to the final. In the 2007 championships, Vanderbilt and Maryland Eastern Shore won two matches to advance to the semifinals. Both teams only needed one match to advance to the best-of-seven finals match.)	Josie Earnest, Vanderbilt	John Williamson	
2008; Details	Thunder Alley; Omaha, Nebraska	Maryland Eastern Shore	4–2	Arkansas State	179–223, 200–181, 180–182, 217–164, 175–152, 174–170	Jessica Worsley, Maryland Eastern Shore	Sharon Brummell	
2009; Details	Super Bowl Lanes; Canton, Michigan	Nebraska (3)	4–1	Central Missouri	200–185, 149–198, 201–168, 201–177, 190–135	Cassandra Leuthold, Nebraska	Bill Straub (3)	
2010; Details	Brunswick Zone Carolier Lanes; North Brunswick, New Jersey	Fairleigh Dickinson (2)	4–3	Nebraska	209–167, 202–222, 203–213, 229–192, 201–222, 230–190, 208–174	Danielle McEwan, Fairleigh Dickinson	Mike LoPresti (2)	
2011; Details	Skore Lanes; Taylor, Michigan	Maryland Eastern Shore (2)	4–2	Vanderbilt	215–197, 164–193, 201–248, 234–204, 235–166, 192–181	Kristina Frahm, Maryland Eastern Shore	Sharon Brummell (2)	
2012; Details	Freeway Lanes; Wickliffe, Ohio	Maryland Eastern Shore (3)	4–2	Fairleigh Dickinson	222–204, 236–215, 167–249, 208–168, 170–223, 203–176	T'nia Falbo, Maryland Eastern Shore	Kristina Frahm	
2013; Details	Super Bowl Lanes; Canton, Michigan	Nebraska (4)	4½–2½	Vanderbilt	211–199, 186–197, 156–169, 190–190, 196–189, 202–182, 246–200	Liz Kuhlkin, Nebraska	Bill Straub (4)	
2014	Game of Wickliffe; Wickliffe, Ohio	Sam Houston	4–2	Nebraska	181–166, 182–187, 193–190, 189–197, 205–191, 195–165	Kimi Davidson, Sam Houston	Brad Hagen	
2015	Tropicana Lanes; Richmond Heights, Missouri	Nebraska (5)	4–2	Stephen F. Austin	237–232, 178–253, 201–171, 179–188, 205–201, 195–154	Julia Bond, Nebraska	Bill Straub (5)	
2016	Brunswick Zone Carolier Lanes; North Brunswick, New Jersey	Stephen F. Austin	4–3	Nebraska	193–205, 238–198, 265–242, 164–227, 196–187, 160–237, 247–192	Kiara Grant, Stephen F. Austin	Amber Lemke	
2017	Raising Cane's River Center; Baton Rouge, Louisiana	McKendree	4–0	Nebraska	182–169, 244–192, 224–212, 240–223	Breanna Clemmer, McKendree	Shannon O'Keefe	
2018; Details	Tropicana Lanes; Richmond Heights, Missouri	Vanderbilt (2)	4–3	McKendree	224–204, 174–233, 182–193, 233–204, 203–255, 208–205, 220–191	Emily Rigney & Katie Stark, Vanderbilt	John Williamson (2)	
2019; Details	RollHouse Wickliffe; Wickliffe, Ohio	Stephen F. Austin (2)	4–1	Vanderbilt	167–183, 222–166, 203–175, 224–190, 213–202	Paige Beeney, Stephen F. Austin	Amber Lemke (2)	
2020	Thunderbowl Lanes; Allen Park, Michigan	Canceled due to the COVID-19 pandemic						
2021; Details	AMF Pro Lanes; North Kansas City, Missouri	Nebraska (6)	4–1	Arkansas State	217–224, 235–194, 201–190, 179–162, 198–170	Crystal Elliott, Nebraska	Paul Klempa	
2022; Details	Wayne Webb's Columbus Bowl; Columbus, Ohio	McKendree (2)	4–0	Stephen F. Austin	201–188, 200–188, 186–182, 215–189	Hope Gramly, McKendree	Shannon O'Keefe (2)	
2023; Details	South Point Hotel; Enterprise, Nevada	Vanderbilt (3)	4–3	Arkansas State	156–191, 171–189, 215–198, 159–196, 205–156, 193–187, 193–160	Jennifer Loredo, Vanderbilt	John Williamson (3)	
2024	Thunderbowl Lanes; Allen Park, Michigan	Jacksonville State	4–3	Arkansas State	239–194, 204–211, 244–207, 183–221, 205–255, 237–190, 255–192	Rebecca Hagerman, Jacksonville State	Shannon O'Keefe (3)	
2025	Suncoast Bowling Center; Las Vegas, Nevada	Youngstown State	4–3	Jacksonville State	204–199, 248–210, 206–258, 244–226, 200–223, 214–232, 228–203	Jade Cote, Youngstown State	Doug Kuberski	
2026	Yorktown Lanes; Parma Heights, Ohio	Jacksonville State (2)	4–1	Wichita State	208–216, 246–213, 240–196, 185–169, 191–184	Erin Klemencic, Jacksonville State	Shannon O'Keefe (4)	
2027	AMF Mt. Lebanon Lanes; Pittsburgh, Pennsylvania							
2028	Royal Scot Golf & Bowl; Lansing, Michigan							

== Team titles ==
Schools that have won the NCAA Championship
6, 3, 2, 1

Team	#	Years
Nebraska	6	2004, 2005, 2009, 2013, 2015, 2021
Maryland Eastern Shore	3	2008, 2011, 2012
Vanderbilt	3	2007, 2018, 2023
Fairleigh Dickinson	2	2006, 2010
Jacksonville State	2	2024, 2026
McKendree	2	2017, 2022
Stephen F. Austin	2	2016, 2019
Sam Houston	1	2014
Youngstown State	1	2025

== Result by school and year ==
51 teams have appeared in the NCAA Tournament in at least one year starting with 2004. The results for all years are shown in this table below. Conference affiliations in the table reflect those in place for the 2026–27 school year. The code in each cell represents the furthest the team made it in the respective tournament:

2004 through 2019

- CH National Champion
- RU National Runner-up
- 3 3rd Place (2004 through 2006 only.)
- 4 4th Place (2004 through 2006 only.)
- 3ᴛ Semifinalists (Starting in 2007, there were two 4-team brackets, so two teams tied for 3rd.)
- 5ᴛ Tied for 5th place
- 7ᴛ Tied for 7th place
- P Lost Play-In Match (2018 through 2019 only.)

2021 through present

- CH National Champion
- RU National Runner-up
- 3 3rd Place
- 4 4th Place
- R_{2} 2nd Place at Regional
- R_{3} 3rd Place at Regional
- R_{4} 4th Place at Regional
- • Lost Play-In Match at Regional

School	Conference	#	8	4	RU	CH	04	05	06	07	08	09	10	11	12	13	14	15	16	17	18	19	21	22	23	24	25	26
Nebraska	CUSA	22	22	18	10	6	CH	CH	3	3ᴛ	7ᴛ	CH	RU	3ᴛ	3ᴛ	CH	RU	CH	RU	RU	3ᴛ	3ᴛ	CH	R_{2}	3	R_{2}	3	R_{2}
Vanderbilt	CUSA	20	20	11	6	3			5ᴛ	CH	3ᴛ	5ᴛ	5ᴛ	RU	3ᴛ	RU	5ᴛ	7ᴛ	7ᴛ	3ᴛ	CH	RU	R_{2}	3	CH	R_{2}	R_{2}	3
Maryland Eastern Shore	MEAC	14	13	7	4	3	7ᴛ	7ᴛ	7ᴛ	RU	CH	7ᴛ	5ᴛ	CH	CH	3ᴛ	3ᴛ			5ᴛ		3ᴛ				R_{3}		
Stephen F. Austin	defunct	7	7	4	4	2												RU	CH	7ᴛ		CH		RU	R_{2}		R_{2}	
Fairleigh Dickinson	NEC	15	13	9	3	2	4	3	CH	3ᴛ		3ᴛ	CH	3ᴛ	RU	5ᴛ	7ᴛ	5ᴛ		7ᴛ			R_{3}	4			R_{3}	
McKendree	GLVC	7	7	6	3	2													3ᴛ	CH	RU	5ᴛ	3	CH	4			
Jacksonville State	CUSA	3	3	3	3	2																				CH	RU	CH
Sam Houston	CUSA	14	11	5	1	1								7ᴛ		7ᴛ	CH	3ᴛ	5ᴛ	3ᴛ	3ᴛ	7ᴛ	R_{2}	R_{4}	R_{2}	4	R_{3}	R_{3}
Youngstown State	CUSA	6	4	3	1	1																	4	R_{3}	R_{2}	3	CH	R_{3}
Arkansas State	CUSA	18	17	7	4	-					RU	7ᴛ	3ᴛ	5ᴛ	5ᴛ	3ᴛ	5ᴛ	5ᴛ	5ᴛ	5ᴛ	5ᴛ	7ᴛ	RU	R_{2}	RU	RU	R_{3}	4
Central Missouri	GLVC	13	13	3	3	-	RU	RU	5ᴛ	5ᴛ	5ᴛ	RU	7ᴛ	7ᴛ	7ᴛ	5ᴛ	7ᴛ	7ᴛ	7ᴛ									
Wichita State	CUSA	2	2	2	1	-																					4	RU
Alabama A&M	SWAC	2	1	1	1	-			RU																			•
New Jersey City	AMCC	7	7	4	-	-	3	5ᴛ	4	7ᴛ	3ᴛ	5ᴛ	3ᴛ															
Wisconsin–Whitewater	Independent	3	3	2	-	-										7ᴛ	3ᴛ	3ᴛ										
North Carolina A&T	MEAC	8	6	1	-	-													3ᴛ		5ᴛ		R_{2}	R_{3}	R_{2}	R_{3}	R_{2}	R_{2}
Delaware State	MEAC	3	2	1	-	-						3ᴛ	7ᴛ										R_{3}					
Bethune–Cookman	defunct	2	2	1	-	-		4	7ᴛ																			
Sacred Heart	CUSA	9	7	-	-	-	5ᴛ	5ᴛ		5ᴛ	7ᴛ				7ᴛ							5ᴛ	R_{2}	R_{4}	R_{3}			
Louisiana Tech	CUSA	6	3	-	-	-																	R_{4}	R_{2}	R_{3}	R_{2}	R_{3}	R_{2}
Minnesota State	defunct	2	2	-	-	-				7ᴛ	5ᴛ																	
Fayetteville State	CIAA	5	1	-	-	-		7ᴛ																	•	•	•	•
Maryville (MO)	GLVC	4	2	-	-	-																			R_{3}	R_{3}	R_{2}	R_{2}
Duquesne	NEC	4	1	-	-	-																	R_{3}		R_{3}	R_{2}		R_{3}
Kutztown	ECC	2	1	-	-	-								5ᴛ													R_{4}	
Mount St. Mary's	Independent	2	1	-	-	-																	R_{4}	R_{2}				
Southern	SWAC	1	1	-	-	-	5ᴛ																					
Winston-Salem State	defunct	1	1	-	-	-	7ᴛ																					
Valparaiso	CUSA	1	1	-	-	-									5ᴛ													
Lincoln Memorial	defunct	1	1	-	-	-															7ᴛ							
Saint Francis (PA)	defunct	1	1	-	-	-															7ᴛ							
Medaille	defunct	4	-	-	-	-																P	R_{3}	R_{3}	R_{4}			
Prairie View A&M	SWAC	4	-	-	-	-																P	R_{4}		R_{4}		•	
Belmont Abbey	Carolinas	3	-	-	-	-																				R_{4}	R_{4}	R_{4}
Bowie State	CIAA	3	-	-	-	-															P	P		R_{4}				
Alabama State	SWAC	2	-	-	-	-																		R_{4}		•		
Marian (WI)	CCIW	2	-	-	-	-																				R_{4}	R_{4}	
Mercyhurst	ECC	2	-	-	-	-																			R_{4}	R_{4}		
Saint Vincent	AMCC	2	-	-	-	-																					•	•
Texas Southern	SWAC	1	-	-	-	-															P							
Caldwell	CACC	1	-	-	-	-																P						
Roberts Wesleyan	ECC	1	-	-	-	-																	R_{4}					
Wilmington (DE)	CACC	1	-	-	-	-																		R_{3}				
Carthage	CCIW	1	-	-	-	-																			R_{4}			
Merrimack	NEC	1	-	-	-	-																				R_{3}		
William Smith	AMCC	1	-	-	-	-																				R_{4}		
Felician	CACC	1	-	-	-	-																					R_{4}	
Newman	GLVC	1	-	-	-	-																						R_{3}
Bryant	ECC	1	-	-	-	-																						R_{4}
Carroll	CCIW	1	-	-	-	-																						R_{4}
Dominican (NY)	CACC	1	-	-	-	-																						R_{4}

== NCAA programs ==
A total of 95 teams (Note: From the linked website, select "Women's Bowling" from the "Sport" menu, and the desired division from the "Division" menu.) are competing in the 2025–26 season:

- 39 from Division I
- 36 from Division II
- 20 from Division III

== Conferences ==
- Allegheny Mountain Collegiate Conference (9 D-III schools)
- Central Atlantic Collegiate Conference (6 D-II schools)
  - The CACC started sponsoring bowling in 2022–23. The CACC received its first automatic bid to the Championship in 2024–25.
- Central Intercollegiate Athletic Association (8 D-II schools)
- College Conference of Illinois and Wisconsin (8 D-III schools)
  - The CCIW effectively absorbed the Central Intercollegiate Bowling Conference, a D-III league that had received official NCAA recognition in 2019–20. Four of the six CIBC members were already full CCIW members. CCIW received its first automatic bid to the Championship in 2022–23.
- Conference Carolinas and Great Midwest Athletic Conference (7 D-II schools)
  - The two D-II leagues announced that they would conduct a joint bowling championship effective in 2021–22. The alliance received its first automatic bid to the Championship in 2023–24.
- Conference USA (12 D-I schools)
  - The Southland Bowling League merged into CUSA after the 2022–23 season. Of the eight final SBL members, two were full CUSA members, namely Louisiana Tech, which has been a full CUSA member since 2013, and Sam Houston, which became a full member in July 2023. The other six SBL members became CUSA associates. These schools were joined by Jacksonville State, which also became a full member in July 2023 and added bowling at that time. CUSA inherited the SBL's automatic bid. In 2024–25, CUSA added affiliate Wichita State, which elevated its club team to full varsity status at that time. After that season, Stephen F. Austin dropped bowling, while CUSA added Nebraska, Sacred Heart, and Wright State as new associates.
- East Coast Conference (9 D-II and 1 D-I schools)
- Great Lakes Valley Conference (7 D-II schools) (Note: The GLVC added women's bowling for 2019–20, effectively absorbing the former bowling league of the Mid-America Intercollegiate Athletics Association. Of the six schools that competed in MIAA bowling in 2018–19, five joined GLVC bowling. Lincoln (MO) dropped bowling after the 2019–20 season, but was immediately replaced by the new bowling team of full GLVC member Quincy. The GLVC has received an automatic bid to the Championship since 2021–22.)
- Mid-Eastern Athletic Conference (9 D-I schools)
- Northeast Conference (8 D-I schools)
- Southwestern Athletic Conference (9 D-I schools)

== See also ==
- List of NCAA Women's Bowling Baker 300 Games
- List of NCAA women's bowling programs
- NAIA Women's Bowling Championship
- NAIA Men's Bowling Championship
