= 2007 NCAA Bowling Championship =

Tournament details
- Dates: April 2007
- Teams: 8

Final positions
- Champions: Vanderbilt (1st title)
- Runner-up: UMES (1st title match)

Tournament statistics
- Matches played: 13
- Attendance: 781 (60 per match)

Awards
- Best player: Josie Earnest, Vanderbilt

The 2007 NCAA Bowling Championship was the fourth annual tournament to determine the national champion of women's NCAA collegiate ten-pin bowling. The tournament was played in Apopka, Florida during April 2007.

Vanderbilt defeated Maryland–Eastern Shore in the championship match, 4 games to 3, to win their first national title.

== Qualification ==
Since there is only one national collegiate championship for women's bowling, all NCAA bowling programs (whether from Division I, Division II, or Division III) were eligible. A total of 8 teams were invited to contest this championship, which consisted of a modified double-elimination style tournament.

Team	Appearance	Previous
Central Missouri	3rd	2006
Fairleigh Dickinson	4th	2006
Maryland–Eastern Shore	4th	2006
Minnesota State–Mankato	1st	Never
Nebraska	4th	2006
New Jersey City	4th	2006
Sacred Heart	3rd	2005
Vanderbilt	2nd	2006

== Tournament bracket ==
- Site: Apopka, Florida

Rounds 1–2
Fairleigh Dickinson	4
MSU–Mankato	1
UMES	4
Central Missouri	2
MSU–Mankato	0
Central Missouri	4
Vanderbilt	4
Sacred Heart	2
Nebraska	4
New Jersey City	2
Sacred Heart	4
New Jersey City	3

Rounds 2–3
Fairleigh Dickinson	4
UMES	3
Nebraska	4
Central Missouri	3
Vanderbilt	4
Nebraska	2
Fairleigh Dickinson	4
Sacred Heart	1

Round 4
UMES	4	–
Nebraska	2	–
Vanderbilt	4	–
Fairleigh Dickinson	1	–

Championship
UMES	3
Vanderbilt	4

== All-tournament team ==
- Josie Earnest, Vanderbilt
- Kristi Kerr, Fairleigh Dickinson
- Kaitlin Reynolds, Vanderbilt
- Marion Singleton, UMES
- Jessica Worsley, UMES
