= 2006 NCAA Bowling Championship =

Tournament details
- Dates: April 2006
- Teams: 8

Final positions
- Champions: Fairleigh Dickinson (1st title)
- Runner-up: Alabama A&M (1st title match)

Tournament statistics
- Matches played: 14
- Attendance: 442 (32 per match)

Awards
- Best player: Lisa Friscioni (Fairleigh Dickinson)

The 2006 NCAA Bowling Championship was the third annual tournament to determine the national champion of women's NCAA collegiate ten-pin bowling. The tournament was played in Houston, Texas during April 2006.

Fairleigh Dickinson defeated Alabama A&M in the championship match, 4 games to 1, to win their first national title.

The tournament's Most outstanding bowler was Lisa Friscioni from Fairleigh Dickinson. An All-tournament team of five bowlers was also named.

== Qualification ==
Since there is only one national collegiate championship for women's bowling, all NCAA bowling programs (whether from Division I, Division II, or Division III) were eligible. A total of 8 teams were invited to contest this championship, which consisted of a double-elimination style tournament.

Team	Appearance	Previous
Alabama A&M	1st	Never
Bethune–Cookman	2nd	2005
Central Missouri State	2nd	2005
Fairleigh Dickinson	3rd	2005
Maryland–Eastern Shore	3rd	2005
Nebraska	3rd	2005
New Jersey City	3rd	2005
Vanderbilt	1st	Never

== Tournament bracket ==
- Site: Houston, Texas

Round 1	Round 2	Round 3–4	Round 6
Nebraska	4
New Jersey City	1
Nebraska	3
Alabama A&M	4
Alabama A&M	4
UMES	1
Alabama A&M	3
F. Dickinson	4
Vanderbilt	4
C. Missouri State	1
Vanderbilt	3
F. Dickinson	4
F. Dickinson	4
Bethune-Cookman	2	F. Dickinson	4	–
Alabama A&M	1	–
Lower round 1	Lower round 2	Lower round 3	Lower final
Vanderbilt	0
New Jersey City	4	New Jersey City	4	Alabama A&M	4
UMES	2	New Jersey City	2	Nebraska	2
Nebraska	4
Nebraska	4
C. Missouri State	4	C. Missouri State	2
Bethune–Cookman	2
