= Maria Bulanova =

Maria Bulanova may refer to:

- Maria Bulanova (bowler)
- Maria Bulanova (ballet dancer)
