= Bulanov =

Bulanov (Russian: Буланов) is a Russian masculine surname, its feminine counterpart is Bulanova. It may refer to

- Aleksandr Bulanov (born 1989), Russian shot putter
- Igor Bulanov (born 1963), Russian footballer
- Maria Bulanova (bowler) (born 1998), Russian bowler
- Maria Bulanova (ballet dancer) (born 2001), Russian ballet dancer
- Tatiana Bulanova (born 1969), Russian singer
- Vyacheslav Bulanov (born 1970), Russian ice hockey referee
