= Joe Williams (defensive end) =

American football player (born 1942)

No. 79, 77
- Position: Defensive end

Personal information
- Born: May 12, 1942 (age 84); Camden, New Jersey, U.S.
- Listed height: 6 ft 3 in (1.91 m)
- Listed weight: 250 lb (113 kg)

Career information
- High school: Haddon Heights (Haddon Heights, New Jersey)
- College: Maryland State
- NFL draft: 1965: undrafted

Career history
- Baltimore Colts (1965)*; Montreal Alouettes (1965–1966); Toronto Argonauts (1966); Baltimore Colts (1967)*; Virginia Sailors (1967–1968); Roanoke Buckskins (1969–1970); Cleveland Browns (1971)*; Washington Redskins (1974)*
- * Offseason or practice squad member only

Joe Williams (born May 12, 1942) is an American former professional football defensive end who played two seasons in the Canadian Football League (CFL) with the Montreal Alouettes and Toronto Argonauts. He played college football at Maryland State College.

== Early life and college ==
Joe Williams was born on May 12, 1942, in Camden, New Jersey. He attended Haddon Heights High School in Haddon Heights, New Jersey.

Williams played tight end for the Maryland State Hawks of Maryland State College from 1961 to 1964.

== Professional career ==
After going undrafted in the 1965 NFL draft, Williams signed with the Baltimore Colts as a linebacker. He was released on August 10, 1965.

Williams played in 13 games for the Montreal Alouettes of the Canadian Football League (CFL) from 1965 to 1966 as a defensive end. He recovered three fumbles in 1965 and also spent some time on offense. He finished the 1966 CFL season by appearing in one game for the Toronto Argonauts.

Williams signed with the Colts again in 1967 but was released. He played in the Atlantic Coast Football League for the Virginia Sailors from 1967 to 1968, and for the Roanoke Buckskins from 1969 to 1970.

Williams was signed by the Cleveland Browns in 1971, but later released in mid-July 1971. He briefly signed with the Washington Redskins in 1974.
