= Craig Robinson (American football) =

American football player (born 1948)

No. 70, 75
- Position: Offensive tackle

Personal information
- Born: December 23, 1948 (age 77); Austin, Texas, U.S.
- Listed height: 6 ft 4 in (1.93 m)
- Listed weight: 250 lb (113 kg)

Career information
- High school: Sidney Lanier (Austin)
- College: Houston
- NFL draft: 1971: 16th round, 392nd overall pick

Career history
- New Orleans Saints (1971)*; Roanoke Buckskins (1971); Baltimore Colts (1972)*; Houston Oilers (1972)*; New Orleans Saints (1972–1973); Washington Redskins (1975)*; San Antonio Wings (1975)
- * Offseason or practice squad member only
- Stats at Pro Football Reference

Joe Craig Robinson (born December 23, 1948) is an American former professional football offensive tackle who played for the New Orleans Saints of the National Football League (NFL). He played college football for the Houston Cougars and was selected by the Saints in the 16th round of the 1971 NFL draft.

== Early life ==
Joe Craig Robinson was born on December 23, 1948, in Austin, Texas. He played high school football at Sidney Lanier High School in Austin. He was only 16 during his senior football season.

== College career ==
In spring 1966, Robinson signed his letter of intent to attend the University of Houston and play college football for the Cougars. He played for the freshman team in 1966 as an offensive tackle. He played for the varsity team in 1967 but did not earn a varsity letter. Robinson ended up redshirting the 1967 season. He only played 28 minutes in 1968 as the backup to Bill Cloud. Robinson became a starter at right tackle three games into the 1969 season after the Cougar offensive line was reshuffled due to an injury to starting guard Ronnie Herman. Robinson was a varsity letterman in 1969 and 1970. He was a team captain in 1970.

== Professional career ==
Robinson was selected by the New Orleans Saints in the 16th round, with the 392nd overall pick, of the 1971 NFL draft. He was released on September 17 before the start of the 1971 regular season.

Robinson then signed with the Roanoke Buckskins of the Atlantic Coast Football League on September 23, 1971. He signed with the Baltimore Colts in 1972. On August 25, 1972, he was traded to the Houston Oilers for cash. Robinson was released by the Oilers before the start of the regular season.

On September 30, 1972, Robinson was signed by the Saints again. He played in the next five games as a reserve offensive tackle before being placed on the taxi squad. On November 25, it was reported that he had been promoted back to the active roster. Robinson played in three more games for the Saints that year. He appeared in 11 games in 1973. He was released on September 10, 1974, before the regular season.

Robinson signed with the Washington Redskins in 1975. He was released on August 8 during the 1975 preseason.

Robinson was signed by the San Antonio Wings of the World Football League (WFL) on August 20, 1975, during midseason. He was on the Wings' active roster during the 1975 WFL season. He was released on September 19, 1975, after the tenth game of the season.
