= 2011 NCAA Bowling Championship =

Tournament details
- Dates: April 15–16, 2011
- Teams: 8

Final positions
- Champions: Maryland Eastern Shore (2nd title)
- Runners-up: Vanderbilt (2nd title match)

Tournament statistics
- Matches played: 13
- Attendance: 878 (68 per match)

Awards
- Best player: Kristina Frahm (Maryland Eastern Shore)

The 2011 NCAA Bowling Championship was the eighth annual tournament to determine the national champion of women's NCAA collegiate ten-pin bowling. The tournament was played at Skore Lanes in Taylor, Michigan from April 15–16, 2011.

Maryland Eastern Shore defeated Vanderbilt in the championship match, 4 games to 2 (215–197, 164–193, 201–248, 234–204, 235–166, 192–181), to win their second national title. The Hawks were coached by Sharon Brummell.

Maryland Eastern Shore's Kristina Frahm was named the tournament's Most Outstanding Player. Frahm, along with four other bowlers, also comprised the All Tournament Team.

== Qualification ==
Since there is only one national collegiate championship for women's bowling, all NCAA bowling programs (whether from Division I, Division II, or Division III) were eligible. A total of 8 teams were invited to contest this championship, which consisted of a modified double-elimination style tournament.

Team	Appearance	Previous
Arkansas State	4th	2010
Central Missouri	7th	2010
Fairleigh Dickinson	7th	2010
Kutztown	1st	Never
Maryland–Eastern Shore	8th	2010
Nebraska	8th	2010
Sam Houston State	1st	Never
Vanderbilt	6th	2010

== Tournament bracket ==
- Site: Skore Lanes, Taylor, Michigan
- Host: Detroit Titans

Rounds 1–2; April 15	Rounds 2–3; April 15
1	Fairleigh Dickinson	4
8	Kutztown	3
1	Fairleigh Dickinson	3.5†
4	Vanderbilt	3.5
4	Vanderbilt	4
5	Central Missouri	1
Upper Bracket
8	Kutztown	4
5	Central Missouri	3	3	UMES	4
8	Kutztown	2
3	UMES	4
6	Arkansas State	1
3	UMES	2
2	Nebraska	4
2	Nebraska	4
7	Sam Houston State	1
Lower Bracket
6	Arkansas State	4
7	Sam Houston State	2	4	Vanderbilt	4
6	Arkansas State	2

Round 4 April 16
1	Fairleigh Dickinson	1	2
3	UMES	4	4
2	Nebraska	1	1
4	Vanderbilt	4	4

Championship; April 16
3	UMES	4
4	Vanderbilt	2

- † Fairleigh Dickinson defeated Vanderbilt in a tiebreaker, 107–105.

=== Championship Match ===
Team	Game 1	Game 2	Game 3	Game 4	Game 5	Game 6
#3 Maryland Eastern Shore (4)	215	164	201	234	235	192
#4 Vanderbilt (2)	192	193	248	204	166	181

== All-tournament team ==
- Kristina Frahm, Maryland Eastern Shore (Most Outstanding Player)
- Tracy Ganjoin, Fairleigh Dickinson
- Brittni Hamilton, Vanderbilt
- Kristina Mickelson, Nebraska
- María Rodríguez, Maryland Eastern Shore
