= 2005 NCAA Bowling Championship =

Tournament details
- Dates: April 2005
- Teams: 8

Final positions
- Champions: Nebraska (2nd title)
- Runners-up: Central Missouri State (2nd title match)

Tournament statistics
- Matches played: 14
- Attendance: 556 (40 per match)

Awards
- Best player: Amanda Burgoyne (Nebraska)

The 2005 NCAA Bowling Championship was the second annual tournament to determine the national champion of women's NCAA collegiate ten-pin bowling. The tournament was played at Wekiva Lanes in Orlando, Florida during April 2005.

Nebraska defeated Central Missouri State in the championship match, 4 games to 2, to win their second consecutive national title. This was a rematch of the previous year's final, also won by Nebraska. The Cornhuskers were coached by Bill Straub.

The tournament's Most outstanding bowler was Amanda Burgoyne from Nebraska. An All-tournament team of five bowlers was also named.

== Qualification ==
Since there is only one national collegiate championship for women's bowling, all NCAA bowling programs (whether from Division I, Division II, or Division III) were eligible. A total of 8 teams were invited to contest this championship, which consisted of a double-elimination style tournament.

Team	Appearance	Previous
Bethune–Cookman	1st	Never
Central Missouri State	2nd	2004
Fairleigh Dickinson	2nd	2004
Fayetteville State	1st	Never
Maryland–Eastern Shore	2nd	2004
Nebraska	2nd	2004
New Jersey City	2nd	2004
Sacred Heart	2nd	2004

== Tournament bracket ==
- Site: Wekiva Lanes, Orlando, Florida

Round 1	Round 2	Round 3–4	Round 6
Nebraska	4
Fayetteville State	0
Nebraska	4
Sacred Heart	1
Sacred Heart	4
Bethune–Cookman	1
Nebraska	4*
F. Dickinson	3
New Jersey City	4
C. Missouri State	3
New Jersey City	0
F. Dickinson	4
F. Dickinson	4
UMES	1	Nebraska	4	–
C. Missouri State	2	–
Lower round 1	Lower round 2	Lower round 3	Lower final
Sacred Heart	1
C. Missouri State	4	C. Missouri State	4	F. Dickinson	0
UMES	2	C. Missouri State	4	C. Missouri State	4
Bethune–Cookman	3
New Jersey City	3
Fayetteville State	0	Bethune–Cookman	4
Bethune–Cookman	4

=== Notes ===
- Each match consisted of a best-of-seven series of games.
- Since Nebraska won its first championship match, an additional Round 7 was not necessary.

== All-tournament team ==
- Amanda Burgoyne, Nebraska (Most outstanding bowler)
- Lindsay Baker, Nebraska
- Tina Peak, Central Missouri State
- Elysia Current, Fairleigh Dickinson
- Sarah Circle, Bethune–Cookman
