= 2025 NCAA Bowling Championship =

Collegiate bowling championship tournament

Tournament details
- Dates: April 11–12, 2025
- Teams: 19

Final positions
- Champions: Youngstown State (1st title)
- Runners-up: Jacksonville State (3rd title match)

The 2025 NCAA Bowling Championship was the 21st edition of the NCAA Bowling Championship, the annual tournament to determine the national champion of women's NCAA collegiate ten-pin bowling. The finals were hosted by the UNLV and played at the Suncoast Bowling Center in Las Vegas, Nevada from April 11 to 12, 2025. The championship game was streamed live on ESPNU. Youngstown State defeated Jacksonville State in the championship game to win its first title.

== Format ==
The 2025 championship featured a 19-team format, with 4 regionals. One regionals had four teams, while three had five, with play-in matches between Belmont Abbey and Prairie View A&M in Arlington, Texas, Marian and Saint Vincent in Rochester, New York, and Kutztown and Fayetteville State in Pittsburgh, Pennsylvania. Each region had one winner who would go on to play in a four-team tournament for the national championship. The 2025 pre-determined regional locations were as follows:

- Arlington, Texas
- Lansing, Michigan
- Rochester, New York
- Pittsburgh, Pennsylvania

Each regional was played as a double-elimination tournament, except for the three play-in matches. All regional matches, except for what the NCAA calls "if necessary regional finals", were best-of-three matches bowled in the following order: five-person team, Baker total pinfall, Baker best-of-seven match play. Any "if necessary regional final" was Baker best-of-seven. Regional winners advanced to the championship event, which was also double-elimination. All matches were bowled under the standard format for regionals (best-of-three matches using specified formats in a specific order) except the championship final, which was Baker best-of-seven.

== Qualification ==
Since there is only one national collegiate championship for women's bowling, all NCAA bowling programs (whether from Division I, Division II, or Division III) were eligible. A total of 19 teams competed in the double-elimination tournament, with 11 conference champions receiving automatic bids and eight teams receiving at-large bids. The teams were revealed in a selection show on March 26, 2025.

=== Bids ===
There were 19 teams selected for the tournament - 11 were selected automatically as conference champions, while another eight were selected at-large. The top four teams in the tournament were seeded and assigned to separate regions; they were the only teams seeded for this tournament.

Conference USA (CUSA) had the most bids of any conference with eight. The Allegheny Mountain Collegiate Conference (AMCC), Central Atlantic Collegiate Conference (CACC), College Conference of Illinois and Wisconsin (CCIW), Central Intercollegiate Athletic Association (CIAA), East Coast Conference (ECC), Great Lakes Valley Conference (GLVC), Conference Carolinas/Great Midwest Athletic Conference (G-MAC), Mid-Eastern Athletic Conference (MEAC), Northeast Conference (NEC), and Southwestern Athletic Conference (SWAC) sent only their conference tournament champions. Additionally, one independent team received an at-large bid to the tournament.

Seed	Team	Conference	Bid type	Appearance	Last
1	Jacksonville State	CUSA	At-large	2nd	2024
2	Nebraska	Independent	At-large	21st	2024
3	Youngstown State	CUSA	At-large	5th	2024
4	Wichita State	CUSA	Automatic	1st	Never
	Arkansas State	CUSA	At-large	17th	2024
	Belmont Abbey	GMAC	Automatic	2nd	2024
	Fairleigh Dickinson	NEC	Automatic	15th	2022
	Fayetteville State	CIAA	Automatic	4th	2024
	Felician	CACC	Automatic	1st	Never
	Kutztown	ECC	Automatic	1st	Never
	Louisiana Tech	CUSA	At-large	5th	2024
	Marian	CCIW	Automatic	2nd	2024
	Maryville	GLVC	Automatic	3rd	2024
	North Carolina A&T	MEAC	Automatic	7th	2024
	Prairie View A&M	SWAC	Automatic	4th	2023
	Saint Vincent	AMCC	Automatic	1st	Never
	Sam Houston	CUSA	At-large	13th	2024
	Stephen F. Austin	CUSA	At-large	7th	2023
	Vanderbilt	CUSA	At-large	19th	2024

== Tournament bracket ==
All regions were double-elimination, except for the finals, which was double-elimination before a single Baker best-of-7 championship match.

=== Arlington Regional ===
==== Play-in ====
Play-in match
Belmont Abbey	2
Prairie View A&M	1

==== Bracket ====
First round Consolation first round
1	Jacksonville State	2
Belmont Abbey	0
Winner's bracket
Sam Houston	1
SFA	4
Belmont Abbey	0
Sam Houston	2
Loser's bracket

Second round Consolation second round
1	Jacksonville State	2
SFA	0
Sam Houston	0
SFA	2

Regional final
1	Jacksonville State	2	-
SFA	0	-

=== Pittsburgh Regional ===
==== Play-in ====
Play-in match
Kutztown	2
Fayetteville State	1

==== Bracket ====
First round Consolation first round
2	Nebraska	2
Kutztown	0
Winner's bracket
Arkansas State	1
Maryville	2
Kutztown	0
Arkansas State	2
Loser's bracket

Second round Consolation second round
2	Nebraska	2
Maryville	1
Arkansas State	0
Maryville	2

Regional final
2	Nebraska	2	-
Maryville	1	-

=== Rochester Regional ===
==== Play-in ====
Play-in match
Marian	2
Saint Vincent	1

==== Bracket ====
First round Consolation first round
3	Youngstown State	2
Marian	0
Winner's bracket
North Carolina A&T	2
Louisiana Tech	1
Marian	0
Louisiana Tech	2
Loser's bracket

Second round Consolation second round
3	Youngstown State	4
North Carolina A&T	2
Louisiana Tech	0
North Carolina A&T	2

Regional final
3	Youngstown State	2	-
North Carolina A&T	1	-

=== Lansing Regional ===
First round Consolation first round
4	Wichita State	2
Felician	0
Winner's bracket
Vanderbilt	2
FDU	1
Felician	1
FDU	2
Loser's bracket

Second round Consolation second round
4	Wichita State	2
Vanderbilt	0
FDU	1
Vanderbilt	2

Regional final
4	Wichita State	2	-
Vanderbilt	0	-

=== Finals ===
==== Las Vegas, Nevada ====
First round Consolation first round
1	Jacksonville State	2
4	Wichita State	1
Winner's bracket
2	Nebraska	0
3	Youngstown State	2
4	Wichita State	0
2	Nebraska	2
Loser's bracket

Second round Consolation second round
1	Jacksonville State	2
3	Youngstown State	1
2	Nebraska	0
3	Youngstown State	2

Championship final
1	Jacksonville State	3
3	Youngstown State	4
