= 2024 NCAA Bowling Championship =

Collegiate bowling championship tournament

Tournament details
- Dates: April 12–13, 2024
- Teams: 18

Final positions
- Champions: Jacksonville State (1st title)
- Runners-up: Arkansas State (4th title match)

The 2024 NCAA Bowling Championship was the 20th edition of the NCAA Bowling Championship, the annual tournament to determine the national champion of women's NCAA collegiate ten-pin bowling. The finals were hosted by the University of Detroit and played at the Thunderbowl Lanes in Allen Park, Michigan from April 12 to 13, 2024. The championship game was streamed live on ESPNU. Jacksonville State defeated Arkansas State in the championship game to win its first title in the program’s inaugural season.

== Format ==
The 2024 championship featured an 18-team format, with 4 regionals. Two regionals had four teams, while two had five, with play-in matches between Fayetteville State and William Smith in Rochester, New York, and Alabama State and Belmont Abbey in Arlington, Texas. Each region had one winner who would go on to play in a four-team tournament for the national championship. The 2024 pre-determined regional locations were as follows:

- Arlington, Texas
- Lansing, Michigan
- Rochester, New York
- Pittsburgh, Pennsylvania

Each regional was played as a double-elimination tournament, except for the two play-in matches. All regional matches, except for what the NCAA calls "if necessary regional finals", were best-of-three matches bowled in the following order: five-person team, Baker total pinfall, Baker best-of-seven match play. Any "if necessary regional final" was Baker best-of-seven. Regional winners advanced to the championship event, which was also double-elimination. All matches were bowled under the standard format for regionals (best-of-three matches using specified formats in a specific order) except the championship final, which was Baker best-of-seven.

== Qualification ==
Since there is only one national collegiate championship for women's bowling, all NCAA bowling programs (whether from Division I, Division II, or Division III) were eligible. A total of 18 teams competed in the double-elimination tournament, with ten conference champions receiving automatic bids and eight teams receiving at-large bids. The teams were revealed in a selection show on March 27, 2024.

=== Bids ===
There were 18 teams selected to the tournament - ten were selected automatically as conference champions, while another eight were selected at-large. The top four teams in the tournament were seeded and assigned to separate regions; they were the only teams seeded for this tournament.

Conference USA (CUSA) had the most bids of any conference with five, while the Northeast Conference (NEC) and Mid-Eastern Athletic Conference (MEAC) had two. The Allegheny Mountain Collegiate Conference (AMCC), College Conference of Illinois and Wisconsin (CCIW), Central Intercollegiate Athletic Association (CIAA), East Coast Conference (ECC), Great Lakes Valley Conference (GLVC), Conference Carolinas/Great Midwest Athletic Conference (G-MAC), and Southwestern Athletic Conference (SWAC) sent only their conference tournament champions. Additionally, two independent teams received an at-large bid to the tournament.

Seed	Team	Conference	Bid type	Appearance	Last
1	Jacksonville State	CUSA	Automatic	1st	Never
2	Arkansas State	CUSA	At-large	16th	2023
3	Youngstown State	CUSA	At-large	4th	2023
4	North Carolina A&T	MEAC	At-large	6th	2023
	Alabama State	SWAC	Automatic	3rd	2022
	Belmont Abbey	GMAC	Automatic	1st	Never
	Duquesne	NEC	At-large	3rd	2023
	Fayetteville State	CIAA	Automatic	3rd	2023
	Hobart and William Smith	AMCC	Automatic	1st	Never
	Louisiana Tech	CUSA	At-large	4th	2023
	Marian	CCIW	Automatic	1st	Never
	Maryland-Eastern Shore	MEAC	Automatic	14th	2019
	Maryville	GLVC	Automatic	2nd	2023
	Mercyhurst	ECC	Automatic	2nd	2023
	Merrimack	NEC	Automatic	1st	Never
	Nebraska	Independent	At-large	20th	2023
	Sam Houston	CUSA	At-large	12th	2023
	Vanderbilt	Independent	At-large	18th	2023

== Tournament bracket ==
All regions were double-elimination, except for the finals, which was double-elimination before a single Baker best-of-7 championship match.

=== Pittsburgh Regional ===
First round Consolation first round
1	Jacksonville State	2
Mercyhurst	0
Winner's bracket
Duquesne	2
UMES	1
Mercyhurst	0
UMES	2
Loser's bracket

Second round Consolation second round
1	Jacksonville State	2
Duquesne	1
UMES	1
Duquesne	2

Regional final
1	Jacksonville State	2	-
Duquesne	1	-

=== Rochester Regional ===
==== Play-in ====
Play-in match
William Smith	2
Fayetteville State	0

==== Bracket ====
First round Consolation first round
2	Arkansas State	2
William Smith	0
Winner's bracket
Vanderbilt	1
Merrimack	2
William Smith	0
Vanderbilt	2
Loser's bracket

Second round Consolation second round
2	Arkansas State	2
Merrimack	1
Vanderbilt	2
Merrimack	0

Regional final
2	Arkansas State	2	-
Vanderbilt	1	-

=== Lansing Regional ===
First round Consolation first round
3	Youngstown State	2
Marian	0
Winner's bracket
Nebraska	0
Maryville	2
Marian	0
Nebraska	2
Loser's bracket

Second round Consolation second round
3	Youngstown State	2
Maryville	0
Nebraska	2
Maryville	1

Regional final
3	Youngstown State	0	4
Nebraska	2	2

=== Arlington Regional ===
==== Play-in ====
Play-in match
Alabama State	0
Belmont Abbey	2

==== Bracket ====
First round Consolation first round
4	North Carolina A&T	2
Belmont Abbey	0
Winner's bracket
Louisiana Tech	1
Sam Houston	2
Belmont Abbey	0
Louisiana Tech	2
Loser's bracket

Second round Consolation second round
4	North Carolina A&T	1
Sam Houston	2
Louisiana Tech	2
4	North Carolina A&T	0

Regional final
Sam Houston	2	-
Louisiana Tech	1	-

=== Finals ===
==== Allen Park, Michigan ====
First round Consolation first round
1	Jacksonville State	2
Sam Houston	0
Winner's bracket
2	Arkansas State	2
3	Youngstown State	0
Sam Houston	1
3	Youngstown State	2
Loser's bracket

Second round Consolation second round
1	Jacksonville State	2
2	Arkansas State	0
3	Youngstown State	0
2	Arkansas State	2

Championship final
1	Jacksonville State	4
2	Arkansas State	3
