= 2008 NCAA Bowling Championship =

Tournament details
- Dates: April 2008
- Teams: 8

Final positions
- Champions: UMES (1st title)
- Runner-up: Arkansas State (1st title match)

Tournament statistics
- Matches played: 15
- Attendance: 467 (31 per match)

Awards
- Best player: Jessica Worsley, UMES

The 2008 NCAA Bowling Championship was the fifth annual tournament to determine the national champion of women's NCAA collegiate ten-pin bowling. The tournament was played in Omaha, Nebraska during April 2007.

Maryland–Eastern Shore defeated Arkansas State in the championship match, 4 games to 2, to win their first national title.

== Qualification ==
Since there is only one national collegiate championship for women's bowling, all NCAA bowling programs (whether from Division I, Division II, or Division III) were eligible. A total of 8 teams were invited to contest this championship, which consisted of a modified double-elimination style tournament. Two more matches, comprising Round 5, were played this year.

Team	Appearance	Previous
Arkansas State	1st	Never
Central Missouri	4th	2007
Maryland–Eastern Shore	5th	2007
Minnesota State–Mankato	2nd	2007
Nebraska	5th	2007
New Jersey City	5th	2007
Sacred Heart	4th	2007
Vanderbilt	3rd	2007

== Tournament bracket ==
- Site: Thunder Alley, Omaha, Nebraska

Rounds 1–2
Central Missouri	4
Nebraska	1
New Jersey City	4
MSU–Mankato	1
Nebraska	0
MSU–Mankato	4
UMES	4
Vanderbilt	0
Arkansas State	4
Sacred Heart	0
Vanderbilt	4
Sacred Heart	3

Rounds 2–3
Central Missouri	2
New Jersey City	4
Arkansas State	4
MSU–Mankato	1
UMES	4
Arkansas State	3
Central Missouri	2
Vanderbilt	4

Rounds 4–5
New Jersey City	2	3
Arkansas State	4	4
UMES	2	4
Vanderbilt	4	3

Championship
Arkansas State	2
UMES	4

== All-tournament team ==
- Jessica Worsley, UMES
- Maria Rodriguez, UMES
- Maggie Adams, Arkansas State
- Brittany Garcia, Vanderbilt
- Vicki Spratford, New Jersey City
