= Nebraska Cornhuskers bowling =

University of Nebraska–Lincoln bowling team

Nebraska Cornhuskers
- Founded: 1983; 42 years ago
- University: University of Nebraska–Lincoln
- Athletic director: Troy Dannen
- Head coach: Paul Klempa (7th season)
- Conference: Conference USA
- Location: Lincoln, Nebraska
- Home arena: Husker Bowling Center
- Nickname: Cornhuskers
- Colors: Scarlet and cream

National championships
- 1991, 1995, 1997, 1999, 2001, 2004, 2005, 2009, 2013, 2015, 2021

NCAA Tournament appearances
- 2004, 2005, 2006, 2007, 2008, 2009, 2010, 2011, 2012, 2013, 2014, 2015, 2016, 2017, 2018, 2019, 2021, 2022, 2023, 2024, 2025

The Nebraska Cornhuskers bowling team competes as part of NCAA Division I, representing the University of Nebraska–Lincoln in Conference USA. The program was founded as a club team in 1983 and became a varsity sport in 1997.

Nebraska is the most successful collegiate program in bowling history, winning eleven national championships and qualifying for every NCAA championship. Most of this success came under Bill Straub, who founded the team in 1989 and coached for thirty-six years. The team has been coached by longtime assistant Paul Klempa since Straub's retirement in 2019.

== History ==
Nebraska's bowling program began in 1983 under head coach Bill Straub, who led the team to Women's International Bowling Congress-sanctioned national titles in 1991 and 1995. Women's bowling became an official varsity sport at NU in 1997, though its two-time club champion men's program did not, and the school granted Jennifer Daugherty the first full scholarship in collegiate bowling history. Nebraska won three more WIBC titles before the NCAA sanctioned its first bowling tournament in 2004. The Cornhuskers won the first two NCAA championships under Straub, who retired in 2019 as a ten-time national champion and was elected to the United States Bowling Congress Collegiate Hall of Fame in 2025. The program has never been ranked lower than seventh.

In 2019, Straub retired and longtime assistant Paul Klempa was named head coach. Klempa led NU to its eleventh national title in 2021.

== Conference affiliations ==
- Independent (1997–2025)
- Conference USA (2025–present)

== Coaches ==
=== Coaching history ===
No.	Coach	Tenure
1	Bill Straub	1990–2019
2	Paul Klempa	2019–present

=== Coaching staff ===
Name	Position	First year	Alma mater
Paul Klempa	Head coach	2019	Nebraska
Julia Bond	Assistant coach	2021	Nebraska

== Championships and awards ==
=== Team national championships ===
- WIBC: 1991, 1995, 1997, 1999, 2001
- NCAA: 2004, 2005, 2009, 2013, 2015, 2021

=== Individual awards ===
- National bowler of the year: Kim Berke (1992), Diandra Hyman (2000), Shannon Pluhowsky (2001, 2004, 2005), Lindsay Baker (2006), Amanda Burgoyne (2007), Cassandra Leuthold (2010), Lizabeth Kuhlkin (2015), Raquel Orozco (2020), Crystal Elliot (2021), Jillian Martin (2025)
- NCAA championship most outstanding bowler: Shannon Pluhowsky (2004), Amanda Burgoyne (2005), Cassandra Leuthold (2009), Lizabeth Kuhlkin (2013), Julia Bond (2015), Crystal Elliott (2021)
- National coach of the year: Bill Straub (2005, 2013, 2017)

=== NCAA champions ===
- Amanda Burgoyne – 2005
- Julia Bond – 2016
- Kelly Belzeski – 2017

=== First-team All-Americans ===
Twenty Nebraska bowlers have combined for thirty-nine first-team All-America honors, in addition to sixteen second-team and thirteen third-team selections. The National Tenpin Coaches Association replaced the National Collegiate Bowling Coaches Association as the primary selector of All-America teams in 2004.

- Kim Berke – 1991
- Carrie Machuga – 1993
- Andrea Rigby – 1995
- Jennifer Daugherty – 1996, 1997, 1998
- Brenda Norman – 1996
- Brenda Edwards – 1997
- Diandra Hyman – 2000, 2001
- Shannon Pluhowsky – 2001, 2002, 2005
- Kari Schwager – 2002
- Amanda Burgoyne – 2005, 2006, 2007
- Lindsay Baker – 2005, 2006
- Cassandra Leuthold – 2008, 2009, 2010
- Kayla Johnson – 2012
- Lizabeth Kuhlkin – 2013, 2014, 2015
- Julia Bond – 2016, 2017, 2018
- Raquel Orozco – 2018, 2019, 2020
- Meghan Straub – 2019
- Crystal Elliot – 2021, 2023
- Jillian Martin – 2023, 2024, 2025
- Kayla Verstraete – 2025

== Seasons ==
National champion

Year (Note: Results unavailable prior to Nebraska's establishment of bowling as a varsity sport.)	Coach	Postseason
Independent (1997–2025)
1997–98	Bill Straub	WIBC 4th
1998–99	Bill Straub	WIBC champion
1999–00	Bill Straub	WIBC 3rd
2000–01	Bill Straub	WIBC champion
2001–02	Bill Straub	WIBC 9th
2002–03	Bill Straub	WIBC 7th
2003–04	Bill Straub	NCAA champion
2004–05	Bill Straub	NCAA champion
2005–06	Bill Straub	NCAA 3rd
2006–07	Bill Straub	NCAA T–3rd
2007–08	Bill Straub	NCAA T–7th
2008–09	Bill Straub	NCAA champion
2009–10	Bill Straub	NCAA runner-up
2010–11	Bill Straub	NCAA T–3rd
2011–12	Bill Straub	NCAA 3rd
2012–13	Bill Straub	NCAA champion
2013–14	Bill Straub	NCAA runner-up
2014–15	Bill Straub	NCAA champion
2015–16	Bill Straub	NCAA runner-up
2016–17	Bill Straub	NCAA runner-up
2017–18	Bill Straub	NCAA 4th
2018–19	Bill Straub	NCAA T–3rd
2019–20	Paul Klempa	Canceled (Note: Canceled due to the COVID-19 pandemic)
2020–21	Paul Klempa	NCAA champion
2021–22	Paul Klempa	NCAA T–5th
2022–23	Paul Klempa	NCAA 3rd
2023–24	Paul Klempa	NCAA regional
2024–25	Paul Klempa	NCAA 3rd
Conference USA (2025–present)
2025–26	Paul Klempa	
