= 2018 NCAA Bowling Championship =

Collegiate bowling tournament

Tournament details
- Dates: April 12–14, 2018
- Teams: 10

Final positions
- Champions: Vanderbilt (2nd title)
- Runner-up: McKendree (2nd title match)

Tournament statistics
- Matches played: 14

The 2018 NCAA Bowling Championship was the 15th edition of the NCAA Bowling Championship, an annual tournament to determine the national champion of women's NCAA collegiate ten-pin bowling. The tournament was played at the Tropicana Lanes in St. Louis, Missouri from April 12–14, 2018.

== Qualification ==
Since there is only one national collegiate championship for women's bowling, all NCAA bowling programs (whether from Division I, Division II, or Division III) were eligible. A total of ten teams contested the championship (six automatically qualifying conference champions and four at-large bids), which consisted of a modified double-elimination style tournament.

=== Bids ===
Seed	Team	Conference	Appearance	Last
1	Nebraska Cornhuskers	Independent	15th	2017
2	McKendree Bearcats	GLVC	3rd	2017
3	Arkansas State Red Wolves	SBL	11th	2017
4	Vanderbilt Commodores	SBL	13th	2017
5	Sam Houston State Bearkats	SBL	7th	2017
6	North Carolina A&T Aggies	MEAC	2nd	2016
7	Saint Francis Red Flash	NEC	1st	–
8	Lincoln Memorial Railsplitters	ECC	1st	–
9	Bowie State Bulldogs	CIAA	1st	–
10	Texas Southern Lady Tigers	SWAC	1st	–

== Tournament bracket ==
=== Play-in rounds ===
Play-in
7	Saint Francis	2
9	Bowie State	0

Play-in
8	Lincoln Memorial	2
10	Texas Southern	0

=== Championship tournament ===
First round
1	Nebraska	2
8	Lincoln Memorial	0
4	Vanderbilt	2
5	Sam Houston State	1
5	Sam Houston State	2
8	Lincoln Memorial	0
3	Arkansas State	2
6	North Carolina A&T	0
2	McKendree	2
7	Saint Francis	0
6	North Carolina A&T	2
7	Saint Francis	0

Quarterfinals
1	Nebraska	0
4	Vanderbilt	2
5	Sam Houston State	2
3	Arkansas State	0
3	Arkansas State	1
2	McKendree	2
6	North Carolina A&T	0
1	Nebraska	2

Semifinals
4	Vanderbilt	1	2
5	Sam Houston State	2	0
2	McKendree	2
1	Nebraska	0

Championship
4	Vanderbilt	4
2	McKendree	3
