= 2019 NCAA Bowling Championship =

Collegiate bowling tournament

Tournament details
- Dates: April 11–13, 2019
- Teams: 8

Final positions
- Champions: Stephen F. Austin (2nd title)
- Runners-up: Vanderbilt (5th title match)

Tournament statistics
- Matches played: 14

The 2019 NCAA Bowling Championship was the 16th annual tournament to determine the national champion of women's NCAA collegiate ten-pin bowling. The tournament was played at the RollHouse Wickliffe in Wickliffe, Ohio from April 11–13, 2019.

== Qualification ==
Since there is only one national collegiate championship for women's bowling, all NCAA bowling programs (whether from Division I, Division II, or Division III) were eligible. A total of 8 teams were given at-large bids for this championship, which consisted of a modified double-elimination style tournament.

=== Bids ===
Team	Appearance	Last
No. 1 Vanderbilt Commodores	14th	2018
No. 2 McKendree Bearcats	4th	2018
Arkansas State Red Wolves	12th	2018
Maryland Eastern Shore Hawks	13th	2017
Nebraska Cornhuskers	16th	2018
Sacred Heart Pioneers	6th	2012
Sam Houston State Bearkats	8th	2018
Stephen F. Austin Ladyjacks	4th	2017

== Tournament bracket ==
Rounds 1–2; April 11	Rounds 2–3; April 11–12
1	Vanderbilt	1
Sacred Heart	4
Sacred Heart	0
Nebraska	2
Nebraska	2
Arkansas State	0
Upper Bracket
1	Vanderbilt	4
Arkansas State	0
1	Vanderbilt	4
2	McKendree	0
Sam Houston State	1
Stephen F. Austin	2
Stephen F. Austin	2
2	McKendree	1
Maryland Eastern Shore	0
2	McKendree	2
Lower Bracket
Sam Houston State	0
Maryland Eastern Shore	2
Maryland Eastern Shore	4
Sacred Heart	1

Rounds 4–5; April 12–13
Nebraska	0	2
1	Vanderbilt	2	4
Stephen F. Austin	2	–
Maryland Eastern Shore	1	–

Championship; April 13
1	Vanderbilt	1
Stephen F. Austin	4

== National Championship ==
Team	1	2	3	4	5
No. 1 Vanderbilt	183	166	175	190	202
Stephen F. Austin	167	222	203	224	213

2019 NCAA Bowling National Champions	Stephen F. Austin Ladyjacks
