= Merrimack Warriors women's bowling =

Women's bowling team of Merrimack College

Merrimack Women’s Bowling
- University: Merrimack College
- Head coach: Jalen Scott Jones (3rd season)
- Conference: DI independent
- Location: North Andover, Massachusetts
- Nickname: Warriors

NCAA tournament appearances
- 2024

Conference tournament champions
- NEC: 2024

The Merrimack College Women’s Bowling program was founded in 2022. They compete as a National Collegiate Athletic Association (NCAA) Division I. They formerly competed in the Northeast conference and won the conference tournament in just their second year. They now compete as a DI independent.

== History ==
The program was founded in 2022. Jalen Scott-Jones would be named as the programs first head coach. They would play their first season during the 2022-23 season as a member of the NEC. The team would find immediate success. As in just their first year they would go 39-19 overall pulling of numerous wins over nationally ranked opponents. They themselves would also find themselves in the top 25 for the first time during the season. On top of this they would also win their first in season tournament when they took first place in the Garden state classic. They would not be able to compete in the NEC tournament though due to the NCAAs transitional period for schools that recently moved to DI. Despite this was a remarkable year for a team in just their first season. The following year they would one up the success of their first season as they would go 43-25 overall being a top ranked school for most of the season. They were also now eligible for the NEC tournament and the warriors made the most of their opportunity in dominant fashion. Winning all 4 of the tournament games including the championship game VS sacred heart 2-0. Securing their first championship in program history in just their second year of existence. This would result in the warriors making their first appearance in the NCAA tournament and would even upset the 4 seed Vanderbilt in the opening game. Before eventually being eliminated in the third round of the regionals putting an end to a historic season.

In 2024 Merrimack College would join the MAAC. This left the program in a bit of a tough spot. Because the MAAC did not sponsor Women’s Bowling. This would force the team to become a DI independent. Now as an independent the team would still go on to have a great year going 41-24 overall. But due to a lack of a conference they would not get a chance to play for an automatic bid in the NCAA tournament.

== Head coaching records ==
Coach	Tenure	Record	%
Jalen Scott Jones	2022–Present	123-68	.644

== In season tournament championships ==
- Garden state classic (2023)
- SHU bowl for cure invitational (2023)
- Northeast Roundup (2024)
- Niagara university Brunswick tournament (2024)

== Division I tournament results ==
Merrimack has made one appearance in the NCAA Division I Women’s bowling playoffs; their record is 1–2.

Year	Round	Opponent	Result
2024	Regional round 2 Regional round 3	Vanderbilt Arkansas St Vanderbilt	W 2-1 L2-1 L 2-0

== Season by season ==
Season	Coach	Record	Postseason	Notes
2022-23	Jalen Scott Jones	39-19		
2023-24	Jalen Scott Jones	43-25	NEC champions NCAA regional round 3	
2024-25	Jalen Scott Jones	41-24		Became a DI independent
