= Maria Bulanova (ballet dancer) =

Russian ballet dancer (born 2001)

- Born: January 12, 2001 (age 25); Saint Petersburg, Russia
- Education: Vaganova Ballet Academy
- Occupation: Ballet dancer
- Years active: since 2008 – present
- Dancing career
- Current group: Mariinsky Ballet

Maria Andreevna Bulanova (born January 12, 2001, Saint Petersburg) is a Russian ballet dancer. She has been a first soloist of the Mariinsky Ballet since 2025 and was nominated for the “Golden Mask” national theatre award in 2022.

== Biography and career ==
Bulanova was born in Saint Petersburg, and started her ballet training at the Academy of Classical Russian Ballet, under Vladislav Kuramshin. From 2008 to 2015 she performed in the academy's theatre troupe named “Choreographic miniatures”, and toured Russia and abroad.

In 2011, Bulanova enrolled at the Vaganova Ballet Academy under Lyudmila Komolova. However, she left the academy after one term.

Bulanova participated in the Youth America Grand Prix international ballet competitions in 2012 and 2013, and was a finalist in 2015, placing in the top 12 in the junior group.

In 2015, Bulanova graduated from secondary school after passing her final examinations. That same year she returned to the Vaganova Ballet Academy, to join the class taught by the Russian ballet tutor Lyudmila Kovaleva.

Bulanova won first prize at the International Vaganova-Prix Ballet Dancers’ Competition in St Petersburg in 2016. In 2018, she graduated from the academy with an excellent diploma and was invited to join the Mariinsky Ballet. Since November 2019, she has been the second soloist of the ballet company. Since September 2025, she has been the first soloist of the Mariinsky Theatre Ballet Company.[5][6].

In 2022, Bulanova was nominated for the “Golden Mask” theatre award in the category “Ballet – modern dance/the best female performance” for her role as 1st Fairy in the ballet Renard. Mavra. The Fairy's Kiss.

Ballet critic Anna Gordeeva has commented on Bulanova's performances

“the young dancer has significant talent – she is able to convey the relationship between her heroine and Death: Myrtha, the Queen of the Wilis or Zarema, who is ready to murder out of jealousy – her performance is something you cannot forget.. Ms. Bulanova looks great in the “Rubies”. .. For now it seems that she will conquer any technique and any style absolutely.^{[1]} One of the most interesting parts Ms. Bulanova has portrayed was the role of Lilac Fairy in the “Sleeping Beauty” – a gracious, dreamy character. In reality she stood against Evil, but despite the ballerina's fragility, her character carried a sense of convincing, confident vigour. Her Lilac Fairy ensured a happy ending to the sweet story, which has such a scary beginning.”^{[2]}

== Repertoire ==
- La Sylphide (Effie)
- Giselle (Myrtha)
- La Bayadère (Gamzatti, D’Jampe, Grand pas)
- Swan Lake (brides, big swans, pas de deux from the Act II)
- The Sleeping Beauty (Lilac Fairy)
- Le Corsaire (Medora, Trio of Odalisques)
- Don Quixote (Kitri, Street Dancer)
- Scheherazade (Zobeide)
- The Firebird (The Firebird, the Princess of Great Beauty)
- The Fountain of Bakhchisarai (Zarema)
- The Nutcracker (Waltz of the Flores, Waltz of the Snowflakes)
- Jewels
- Symphony in C (III. Allegro vivace)
- A Midsummer Night's Dream (Hippolyta)
- In the Night
- The Legend of Love (Dance of the Court Dancers, monologue of Mekhmeneh Bahnu, adagio Act III)
- The Little Humpbacked Horse (Mare, Sea Princess)
- Anna Karenina (Princess Betsy)
- Cinderella (Female Dance, Dance teachers)
- Paquita (Carducha)
- Pulcinella (Prudenza)
- Push Comes to Shove
- Le baiser de la fée (Fairy I)
- The Pharaoh's Daughter (Fisherman’s Wife)
- The Bronze Horseman (The Queen of the Ball)
- LENINGRAD SYMPHONY (the Girl) ballet set to music by Dmitry Shostakovich
- Spartacus (Aegina,Maiden from Gades)
- Le Jeune homme et la mort (choreographer Roland Petit)

== Awards ==
- 2014: first prize in the “Anna Pavlova” international competition of junior ballet dancers in the category “Modern choreography” and second prize in the category “Soloists of classic dance”, medium group (10-13 y.o.).
- 2016: laureate of Vaganova-Prix competition, 1st rank.
- 2022: nomination for “Golden Mask” award in the category “Ballet/Contemporary Dance – Best Actress” for the role of 1st Fairy in the ballet Renard. Mavra. The Fairy's Kiss.
