= Roanoke Buckskins =

Defunct American football team

- Founded: 1969
- Folded: 1971
- League: Atlantic Coast Football League
- Based in: Roanoke, Virginia
- Arena: Victory Stadium

The Roanoke Buckskins were a minor league American football team based in Roanoke, Virginia. They played three seasons in the Atlantic Coast Football League (ACFL) from 1969 to 1971 and played their home games at Victory Stadium in Roanoke.
