= Maria Bulanova (bowler) =

Russian ten-pin bowler

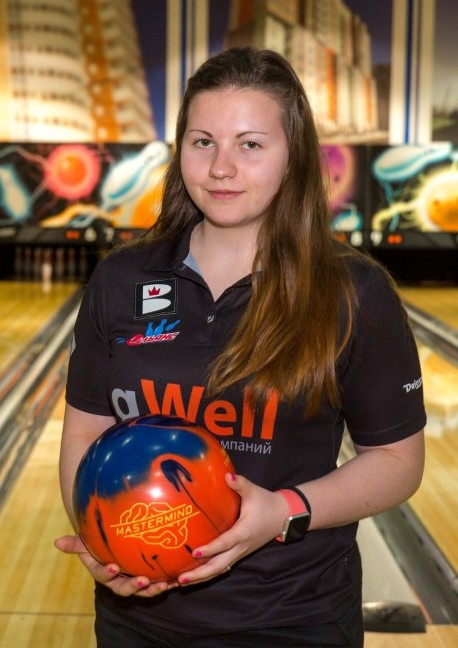
- Born: Maria Bulanova; October 13, 1998 (age 27); Moscow, Russia
- Occupation: Ten-pin bowler
- Years active: 2005–present

Maria Bulanova (born October 13, 1998) is a right-handed ten-pin bowler from Moscow, Russia, and is considered one of the top players on the Federation of Bowling of Russia. The youngest holder of the highest Russian's bowling sports rank - Master of sports of Russia of the international class. Russian national team (youth & adult) member since 2012. Champion of Russia 2013-2015, the first in Russian history individual and team gold winner in international youth championships. Fifteen time prize winner of European youth championships (3 gold, 6 silver and 6 bronze). Winner of European Champions Cup 2015. The first Russian athlete to win a Gold medal in an international adult championship. She is a member of team Alliance (Nizhniy Novgorod, Russia) and a member of the Brunswick pro staff.

In September 2013, Bulanova became the youngest player ever to win a European Bowling Tour title, at age 14.

In March 2016 she broke the record over 6 games in singles of European Youth Championships by a score of 1470.

She studied at Vanderbilt University (class 2020) in Nashville, TN. Representing the Vanderbilt Commodores as a part of their Women’s Bowling Team - National Collegiate Athletic Association's National Bowling Championships 2018. 2 times First-team All-American (2017, 2019) and Second-team All-American 2018. The National Rookie of the Year 2017. The Division I Player of the Year 2019. Bulanova included in Russian bowling Hall of fame since 2014 and was awarded the Female Amateur Athlete of the Year 2019 honoree of Tennessee Sports Hall of Fame.

== Personal stats ==
- Throws: Right
- Hometown: Moscow, Russia
- 300 games: 3
- Highest 3-game series: 809
- Highest 6-game series: 1483

== Titles and awards ==
- 4-time prizewinner on European Youth Championships 2013 (1 silver and 3 bronze medals)
- Winner of RedExpress Russian Open 2013 (12th step of European Bowling Tour)
- Champion of Russia 2013
- Champion of European Youth Championship 2014 in singles and team events, silver in all events
- Champion of Russia on Russian Team Championships 2014 in all women events - doubles, trios, teams and individual all event
- 3rd place on 5th Russian Open 2014 (13th step of EBT)
- 4th place and special prize for best women result (299) in one game on 50th Bowling World Cup 2014.
- Champion of Russia 2014.
- Winner of 2nd Hurghada Open
- 4-time prizewinner on European Youth Championships 2015 (1 silver and 3 bronze medals)
- Champion of Russia on Russian Championships 2015 in all women events - singles, doubles, trios, teams and all events. Rolled the lone women's 300.
- Winner of European Champions Cup 2015
- 3rd place on 51st Bowling World Cup 2015
- Champion of European Youth Championship 2016 in singles, silver in all events, teams and masters.
- Owner of the European Tenpin Bowling Federation's record over 6 games in Singles of European Youth Championships by a score of 1470.
- Vice-champion on European Champions Cup 2016
- Southland Bowling League Bowler of the Month for December 2016
- In the season 2016–2017 was named first-team All-American and the national Rookie of the Year
- In the season 2017–2018 was named second-team All-American
- National Collegiate Athletic Association Bowling National Champion 2018
- Southland Bowling League Bowler of the Month for October 2018
- Southland Bowling League Bowler of the Month for February 2019
- In the season 2018–2019 was named Southland Bowling League Player of the Year and All-Conference First Team
- In the season 2018–2019 was named the Division I Player of the Year and first-team All-American
- In 2019 was awarded the Female Amateur Athlete of the Year 2019 honoree of Tennessee Sports Hall of Fame
- Southland Bowling League Bowler of the Month for January 2020

== Pictures ==
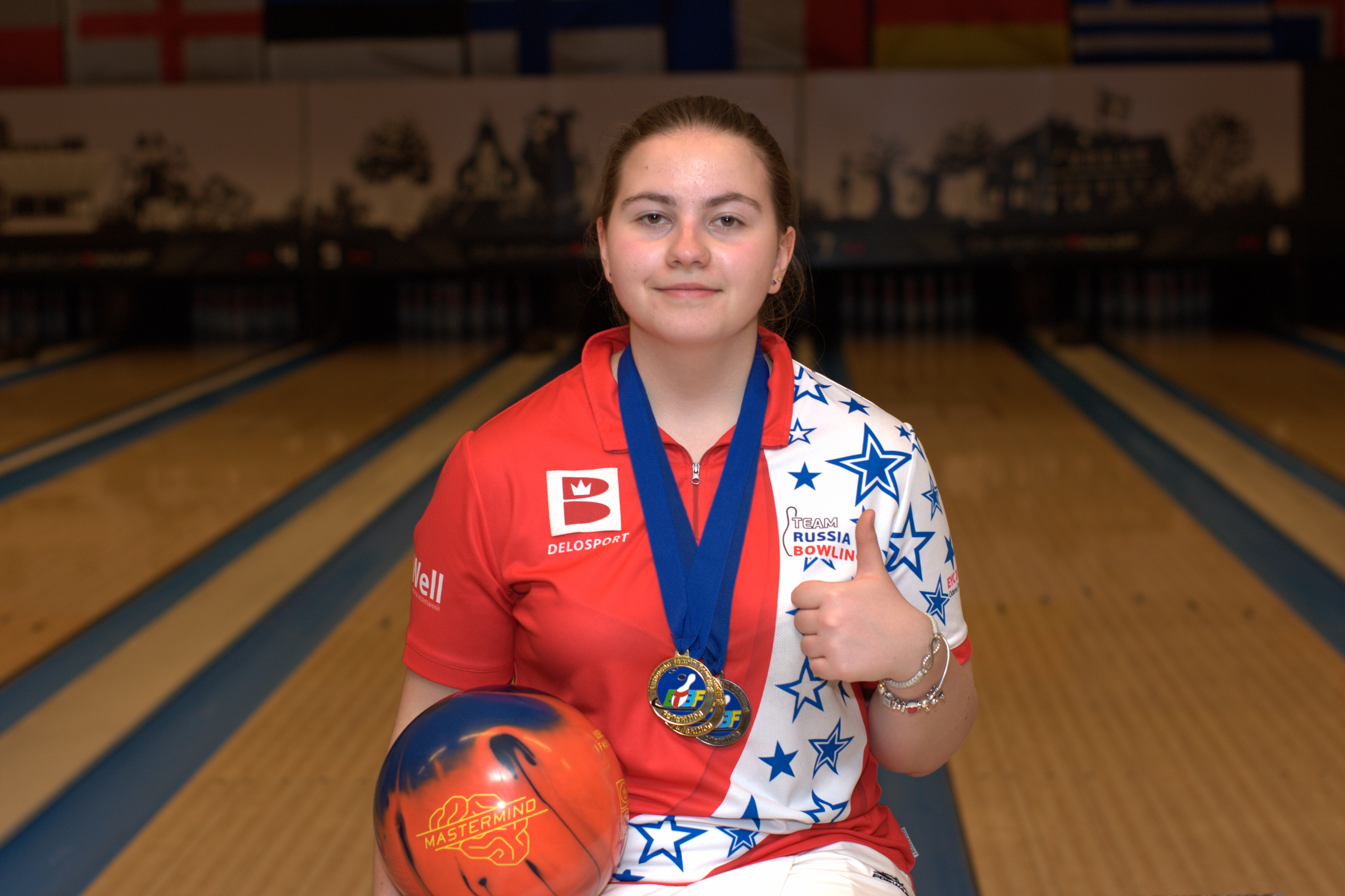
Maria Bulanova, twice champion of European Youth Championship 2014 (singles & team events) and silver prize winner in all events

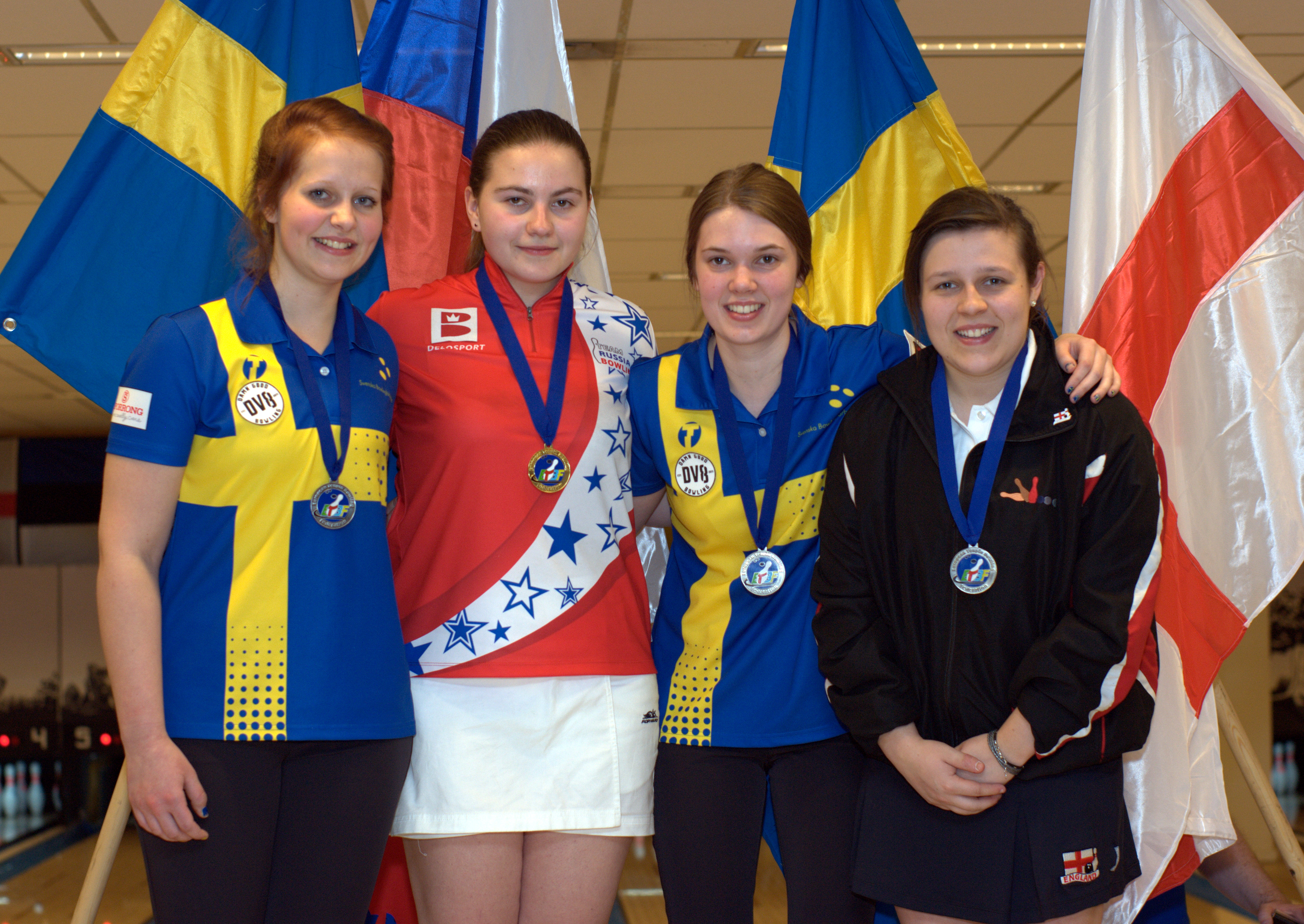
Prize winners of European Youth Championship 2014 in singles event with champion Maria Bulanova

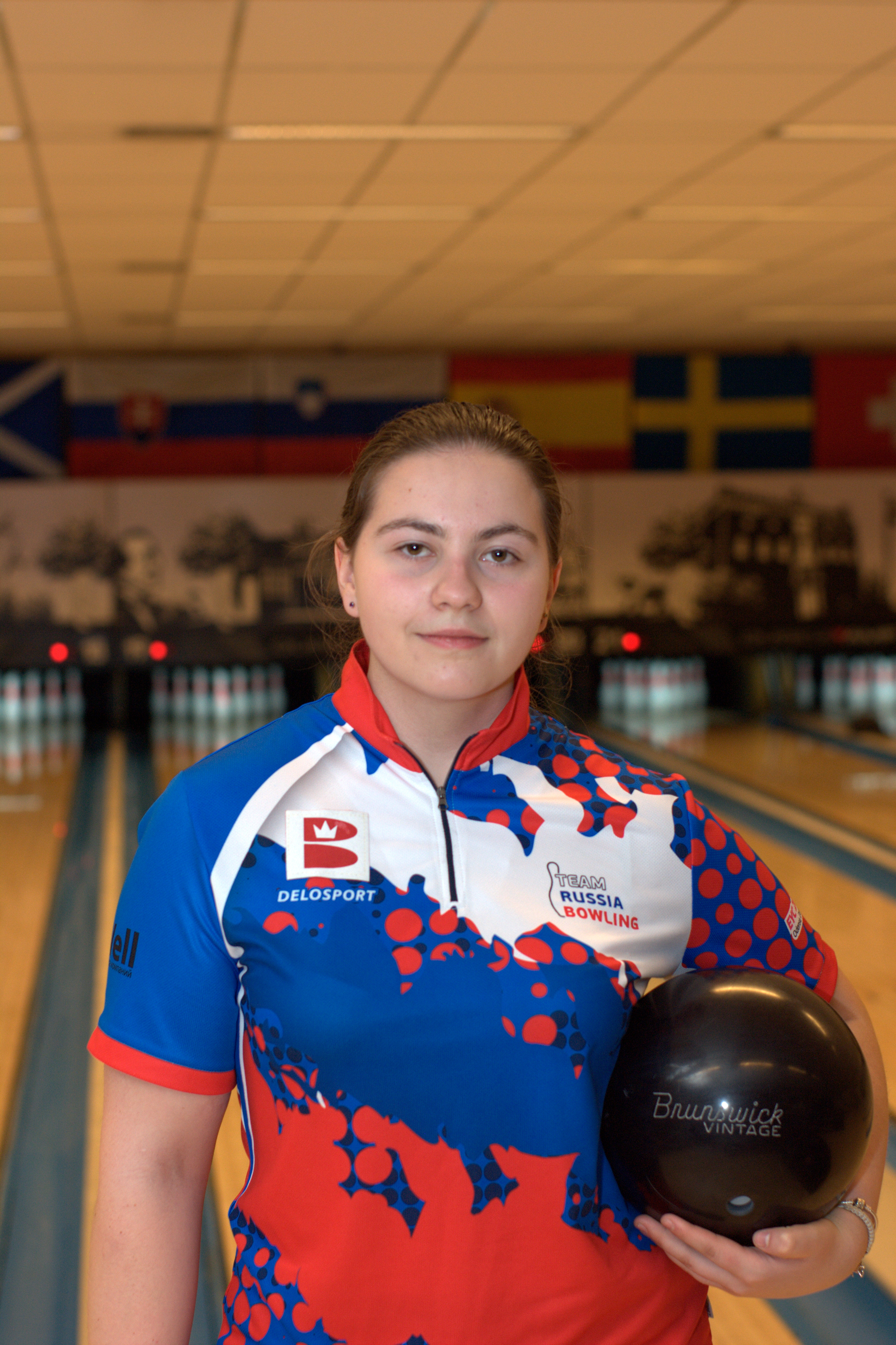
Maria Bulanova

== Sources ==
- http://www.bowlwithbrunswick.com/pros/maria-bulanova
- http://russianbowling.ru
- https://www.bowling.ru
- http://www.bowlingdigital.com
- http://talktenpin.co.uk
- https://web.archive.org/web/20170921123325/http://rusbowling.com/
- https://web.archive.org/web/20140427045258/http://bowlingnn.ru/
- http://www.bowlersjournal.com
- https://vucommodores.com/sports/wbowl/
