= Delaware State Hornets =

Intercollegiate sports teams of Delaware State University

- University: Delaware State University
- Nickname: Hornets
- NCAA: Division I (FCS)
- Conference: Mid-Eastern Athletic Conference (primary); Northeast Conference (baseball, women's golf, women's lacrosse, women's soccer); ECAC (equestrian)
- Athletic director: Brian Ellerbe (Interim)
- Location: Dover, Delaware
- Varsity teams: 18
- Football stadium: Alumni Stadium
- Basketball arena: Memorial Hall
- Baseball stadium: Bob Reed Field
- Colors: Columbia blue and red
- Mascot: Too-Fly
- Website: dsuhornets.com
- Dsu-hornets-wordmark.svg

The Delaware State Hornets are the eighteen sports teams representing Delaware State University in Dover, Delaware in intercollegiate athletics, including men and women's basketball, cross country running, tennis, and track and field; women's-only bowling, softball, and volleyball; and men's-only baseball.

== History ==
The Hornets compete in NCAA Division I; they have been members of the Mid-Eastern Athletic Conference since 1970. While most teams play in the MEAC, the women's equestrian team plays in the ECAC/National Collegiate Equestrian Association, and the baseball, women's soccer, women's lacrosse and women's golf teams all compete in the Northeast Conference.

The university's Department of Intramural Sports provides a wide variety of quality recreational programs for students, faculty and staff.

In 2024, Delaware State announced the school would field a women's wrestling program, the first for an HBCU. The program would begin competition in 2025 when women's collegiate wrestling becomes an official NCAA sport. The Hornets had a men's program until 2009.

== Sponsored sports ==
A member of the Mid-Eastern Athletic Conference (MEAC), Delaware State sponsors teams in six men's and twelve women's NCAA sanctioned sports.

Men's sports	Women's sports
Baseball	Basketball
Basketball	Bowling
Cross country	Cross country
Football	Equestrian
Track and field^{†}	Golf
	Lacrosse
	Soccer
	Softball
	Tennis
	Track and field^{†}
	Volleyball
	Wrestling
† – Track and field includes both indoor and outdoor

=== Basketball ===
The university has both men's and women's basketball teams.

Its men's basketball team won the 2005 MEAC championship and earned a berth in the 2005 NCAA tournament. Playing as a sixteen-seed, the Hornets lost 57–46 in the opening round to one-seed Duke University. The Hornets also have made back to back National Invitation Tournament appearances in 2006 and 2007.

The women's basketball team won the 2006 MEAC championship and earned a berth in the 2006 NCAA tournament. Playing as a fifteen-seed, the Lady Hornets kept the game close down by only three until nine minutes remained in the game, but lost 62–47 in the opening round to two-seed Vanderbilt University.
