= Maryland Eastern Shore Hawks =

Intercollegiate sports teams of University of Maryland Eastern Shore

- University: University of Maryland Eastern Shore
- NCAA: Division I
- Conference: MEAC (primary); NEC (baseball, men's & women's golf)
- Athletic director: Tara Owens
- Location: Princess Anne, Maryland
- Varsity teams: 15
- Basketball arena: Hytche Athletic Center
- Baseball stadium: Hawk Stadium
- Nickname: Hawks
- Colors: Maroon and gray
- Mascot: Harry
- Website: easternshorehawks.com

The University of Maryland Eastern Shore Hawks (commonly UMES and also known as the Eastern Shore Hawks) are the fifteen sports teams representing the University of Maryland Eastern Shore in Princess Anne, Maryland in intercollegiate athletics. These include men and women's basketball, cross country, indoor track, outdoor track, and tennis; women's sports include bowling, softball, and volleyball; men's sports include baseball and golf. The Hawks are members of the Mid-Eastern Athletic Conference (MEAC) in most sports, with other memberships in the Eastern College Athletic Conference and Northeast Conference.

The Hawks compete in the MEAC for all sports except baseball, men's golf, and women's golf, in which they compete as Northeast Conference members, and additionally in the ECAC for cross country, track and field and bowling.

== Teams ==
Men's sports	Women's sports
Baseball	Basketball
Basketball	Bowling
Cross country	Cross country
Golf	Golf
Track and field^{†}	Softball
Volleyball	Tennis
	Track and field^{†}
	Volleyball
† – Track and field includes both indoor and outdoor

== Football ==
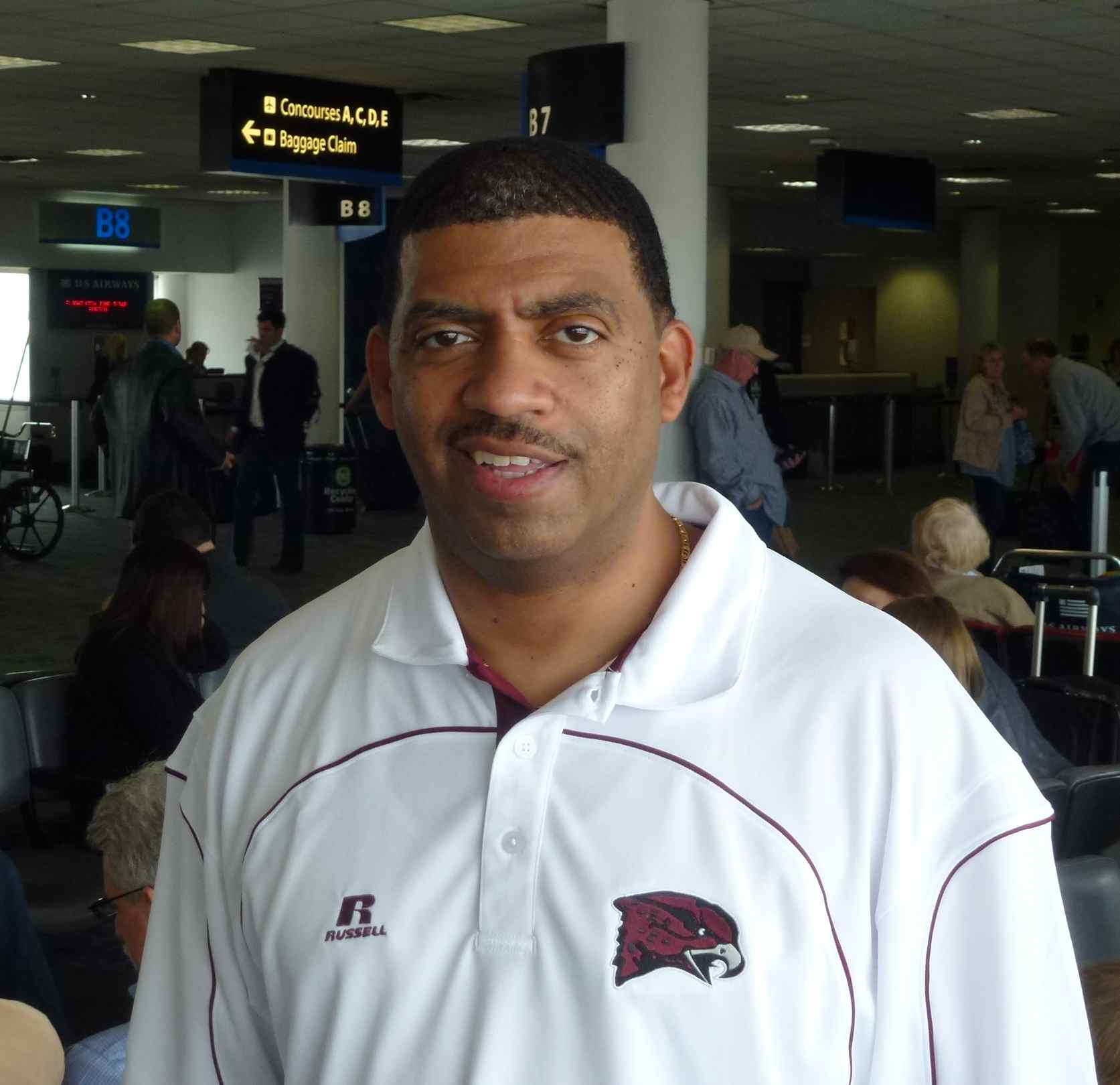
Fred Batchelor, former head coach of the women's basketball team

From 1946 to 1980, Maryland Eastern Shore (Maryland State College from 1946 to 1970) fielded a successful football program. UMES football produced 20 future NFL players, most notably Art Shell of the Oakland / Los Angeles Raiders. The program was discontinued in 1980.

== Bowling ==
Since it was upgraded to an NCAA varsity sport in 2003–04, the Hawks have had one of the best programs in NCAA Bowling. The Hawks have won three national titles (2008, 2011, 2012) and were national runners-up in 2007. UMES has also won five MEAC titles in that span.

== NCAA national championships ==
=== Team ===
Sport	Association	Division	Year	Opponent	Score
Bowling (3)	NCAA	Division I	2008	Arkansas State	4–2
Bowling (3)	NCAA	Division I	2011	Vanderbilt	4–2
Bowling (3)	NCAA	Division I	2012	Fairleigh Dickinson	4–2
Men's outdoor track and field (2)	NAIA (1)	Single	1963	Omaha	82–33 (+49)
Men's outdoor track and field (2)	NCAA (1)	Division II	1963	Fresno State	98–64 (+34)

== Notable former Hawks ==
- Emerson Boozer (1965) - Former NFL Running Back, New York Jets
- Roger Brown (1960) - Former NFL Defensive Tackle, Detroit Lions and Los Angeles Rams
- Earl Christy (1967) - Former NFL Cornerback, New York Jets
- Jim Duncan (1968) - Former NFL Cornerback, Baltimore Colts and New Orleans Saints
- Brasheedah Elohim - American-Israeli women's professional basketball player
- Carl Hairston (1975) - Former NFL defensive lineman and coach
- Merrecia James (2008) - Jamaican Track & Field middle-distance runner
- Charles Mays (1964) - Olympic long jumper and New Jersey State Assemblyman
- Johnny Sample (1958) - Former NFL Defensive Back, Baltimore Colts, Pittsburgh Steelers, and Washington Redskins
- Art Shell (1968) - Pro Football Hall of Famer and Former NFL offensive tackle and coach, Los Angeles/Oakland Raiders, Atlanta Falcons, and Kansas City Chiefs
- Ira Smith (1990) - Former Minor League baseball player, Los Angeles Dodgers system
- Charlie Stukes (1967) - Former NFL Defensive Back, Baltimore Colts and Los Angeles Rams
- Billy Thompson (1969) - Former NFL Defensive Back, Denver Broncos
- Joe Williams (1965) - Former CFL Defensive End, Montreal Alouettes and Toronto Argonauts
