= Fairleigh Dickinson Knights =

Sports teams of a university or college

- University: Fairleigh Dickinson University
- Conference: Northeast Conference
- NCAA: Division I
- Athletic director: Bradford Hurlbut
- Location: Teaneck, New Jersey
- Varsity teams: 20
- Basketball arena: Bogota Savings Bank Center
- Baseball stadium: Naimoli Family Baseball Complex
- Softball stadium: FDU Softball Field
- Volleyball arena: Bogota Savings Bank Center
- Mascot: Knightro
- Nickname: Knights
- Colors: Burgundy and blue
- Website: fduknights.com
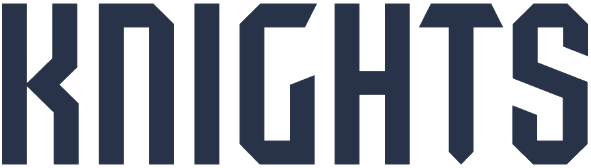

The Fairleigh Dickinson Knights refer to the 17 intercollegiate sports teams representing Fairleigh Dickinson University's Metropolitan campus in Teaneck & Hackensack, New Jersey. Fairleigh Dickinson's Florham Campus has a different mascot, the Fairleigh Dickinson Blue Devils. Fairleigh Dickinson University or (FDU) offers a variety of sports on the Division I level. The women's bowling team has won two national titles: in 2006 and 2010. The men's basketball team has reached the NCAA Tournament seven times in the program's history (1985, 1988, 1998, 2005, 2016, 2019, and 2023). The Knights compete in the NCAA Division I and are members of the Northeast Conference.

In 2023, the men's basketball team created one of the biggest upsets in the NCAA tournament history by overcoming a 23.5 point spread to knock off Purdue. In doing so, the Knights became the second team in history as a 16-seed team to defeat a 1-seed team.

== Sports sponsored ==
A member of the Northeast Conference, Fairleigh Dickinson sponsors teams in nine men's and eleven women's NCAA sanctioned sports:

Men's sports	Women's sports
Baseball	Basketball
Basketball	Bowling
Cross country	Cross country
Golf	Fencing
Soccer	Golf
Tennis	Lacrosse
Track and field^{†}	Soccer
Volleyball	Softball
	Tennis
	Track and field^{†}
	Volleyball
† – Track and field includes both indoor and outdoor.

=== Men's basketball ===
On March 17, 2023, the FDU team became the second team in history to upset a 1 seed as a 16 seed against Purdue in the 2023 NCAA Division I men's basketball tournament.

=== Men's soccer ===
Toby Kim has been coach of the soccer team for over a quarter of a century, and was named 2000 Northeast Conference Men's Soccer Coach of the Year. As of 2022, he was the winningest coach in FDU men's soccer history (223-186-65, .538), the winningest coach in Northeast Conference history (115-60-37, .626), and the ninth active-winningest-coach in NCAA Division I.

Jacob Lissek holds the Knights' all-time career record for shutouts (26).

=== Women's bowling ===
The Knights bowling team won the NCAA Bowling National Championship in 2006 and 2010.

== Florham Campus ==
The FDU Florham Campus sports teams are called the Devils. They are in NCAA Division III and the Eastern College Athletic Conference (ECAC) and they compete in the Middle Atlantic Conferences' (MAC) MAC Freedom. The women's basketball team won the national collegiate basketball championship in the year 2013–2014.

The Women's basketball team also made it to the NCAA tournament four times in a row from the year 2012 to 2016. Their mascot is Ian the Devil.
