= Central Missouri Mules and Jennies =

- University: University of Central Missouri
- Nickname: Mules (men); Jennies (women)
- NCAA: Division II
- Conference: MIAA (primary); GLVC (women's bowling)
- Athletic director: Matt Howdeshell
- Location: Warrensburg, Missouri
- Varsity teams: 15 (7 men's, 8 women's)
- Football stadium: Audrey J. Walton Stadium
- Basketball arena: Jerry M. Hughes Athletic Center
- Colors: Cardinal and black
- Mascot: Mo the Mule
- Fight song: 'Go Mules'
- Website: ucmathletics.com

The Central Missouri Mules and Jennies are the athletic teams that represent the University of Central Missouri, located in Warrensburg, Missouri, in intercollegiate sports at the Division II level of the National Collegiate Athletic Association (NCAA). Central Missouri has primarily competed in the Mid-America Intercollegiate Athletics Association since its founding in the 1912–13 academic year.

== Origin of nickname ==
When the 1921–22 school year began, school officials decided "Normals" and "Teachers" were no longer appropriate nicknames for Central's athletic teams. Therefore, the school's athletic committee established a contest that promised the winner a three-year postgraduate subscription of the school newspaper. More than 80 suggestions were received, but the winning entry was submitted by John Thomason of Chilhowee, Missouri, Class of 1924, who felt that at least one Missouri team should be known as "Mules".

The "Jennies" nickname for Central Missouri's women's athletic teams was officially adopted in February 1974 after the school's student newspaper, The Muleskinner, offered a prize of $50 in a contest to choose a nickname for the women's athletic teams. Cynthia Almaguer of Knob Noster, Missouri, Class of 1974, was chosen winner from 34 entries. Almaguer told the contest judges, "The reason I picked the name is because of the obvious feminine kinship of the jenny to our mule mascot. It is a fact that a mule is a descendant of a female donkey – the jenny."

In truth, however, mules are sired by jack asses (male donkeys) mated to mares (female horses); a jenny crossed with a stallion (male horse) produces a hinny.

== Sports sponsored ==
MIAA logo in Central Missouri's colors

Men's sports	Women's sports
Baseball	Basketball
Basketball	Bowling
Cross country	Cross country
Football	Golf
Golf	Soccer
Track and field^{†}	Softball
Wrestling	Track and field^{†}
	Volleyball
† – Track and field includes both indoor and outdoor

=== Men's basketball ===
The Mules have been playing basketball since 1905, and are among the top two teams in all-time wins on the NCAA Division II level. The Mules have won four national titles: in 1937, 1938 (both National Association of Intercollegiate Athletics, before the NCAA sponsored a Division II tournament), in 1984 (when UCM, then Central Missouri State University, was the first school ever to win NCAA men's and women's basketball championships in the same season), and in 2014. UCM swept the Division II titles in 1984. (The feat was later duplicated by Northwestern College (Iowa) in NAIA Division II in 2001 and the University of Connecticut in NCAA Division I in 2004 and 2014, although the Mules are the only team to win both championships on the same day and on the same court.)

Entering the 2008–09 season, Central Missouri was second in Division II history in wins, with 1,469. Only Central Washington University has more.

The Mules were under the leadership of Head Coach Kim Anderson until the end of the 2014 year, a standout player in the late 1970s at the University of Missouri under coach Norm Stewart.

=== Prominent men's basketball coaches ===
- Phog Allen – coached at UCM 1912–1919; compiled 84–31 record before returning to coach his alma mater, the University of Kansas.
- Tom Scott – coached at UCM from 1939 to 1942 and 1945–46. Scott was lured away by the North Carolina Tar Heels, where he was head coach from 1946 to 1952, when replaced by Frank McGuire.
- Gene Bartow – coached three seasons at UCM, 1961–1964; coached for 34 seasons at the collegiate level, including succeeding the legendary John Wooden at UCLA in 1975 and creating the basketball program at UAB.
- Joe B. Hall – followed Bartow as coach for the 1964–65 season before going to the University of Kentucky, where he would eventually succeed the legendary Adolph Rupp in 1972.
- Lynn Nance – came to UCM from Iowa State in time for the 1980–81 season. Nance led the Mules to their third national championship in 1984. He stayed at the helm until 1985 and finished with a record of 115–35. He went on to coach at the University of Washington.
- Jim Wooldridge – followed Nance, coaching 1985–91, in which he compiled a record of 131–48. His final three squads made the Sweet Sixteen in Division II. After UCM, Wooldridge coached at several NCAA Division I schools, and is currently the Director of Intercollegiate Athletics for UC Riverside.
- Kim Anderson – coached from 2002 to 2014, winning the National Championship in 2014 and compiling a record of 274–94. Anderson left to coach for his alma mater, the University of Missouri, in 2014.

=== Women's basketball ===
The university has sponsored women's basketball since 1970. The Jennies began competing on the NCAA Division II level during the 1982–83 season. Prior to that, they were members of the AIAW (Association of Intercollegiate Athletics for Women). In the 35 seasons of Jennies basketball, only two seasons have ended with a sub-.500 record. Besides the national title in 1984, the program has a history of great postseason success.

- 1983 – Final Four
- 1984 – Won Championship
- 1985 – Lost title game
- 1986 – Elite Eight
- 1987 – Sweet Sixteen
- 1988 – Sweet Sixteen
- 1989 – Final Four
- 1990 – Elite Eight
- 2018 – Won Championship

In the 2006–07 season, despite one of the worst season's in school history at 14–14, UCM was 10th in all of Division II in home attendance.

=== Baseball ===
The Mules baseball program has been arguably the most successful program in the school's history. The team has taken part in the Division II World Series 13 times, 12 of those being since 1989. They have been to the title game three times, winning the title in 1994 coached by Dave Van Horn and 2003 coached by Brad Hill. The Mules have a large number of current pro players, especially considering that UCM is a Division II school. In the 2005 Major League Baseball Draft, five Mules were selected in the first 11 rounds.

==== Notable players ====
Currently, there are 14 professionals that attended Central Missouri.

- Morgan Burkhart (played 1994) – Manager – Windy City Thunderbolts (Frontier League)
- Josh Outman (2005) – Left-handed Pitcher – Oakland (MLB – Cleveland Indians)
- Seth Wheeler– catcher – current Emporia State University coach

=== Softball ===
Central Missouri's softball team appeared in two Women's College World Series in 1971 and 1972.

=== Football ===
A Mules football game in 2026

Football has been sponsored by the university since 1895. Historically, it has not enjoyed the consistent success that other athletic teams have had. However, with the hiring of head coach Willie Fritz before the 1997 season, the Mules became relevant again. Since coming to UCM, Fritz has a record of 82–40. That includes two postseason appearances. In 2001, the Mules went 10–2 and won the Mineral Water Bowl in Excelsior Springs, Missouri. In 2002, they made their first ever trip to the NCAA Division II playoffs, losing to Northern Colorado 49–28.

Prior to the NCAA sponsoring a playoff in Division II, Central Missouri played in three bowl games.

- 1950 Mirza Shrine Bowl in Pittsburg, Kansas, where they defeated Pittsburg State University 32–21.
- 1968 Mineral Water Bowl – Were defeated 10–0 by Doane College
- 1970 Pecan Bowl in Arlington, Texas – Lost to Arkansas State University 38–21.

The Mules have won or shared eight MIAA conference titles in football. (1926, 1956, 1970, 1983, 1986, 1987, 1988, 2003)

==== Prominent coaches ====
The Mules have had two prominent coaches who have guided them. Phog Allen coached football at Central from 1912 to 1917, with a record of 29–19–2. Al Molde came on in 1980. Molde only stayed three seasons, but his tenure turned around a program that wished the 1970s never happened. Central's record from 1971 to 1979 was 27–63–2. Molde left in 1983 after compiling a 17–9–4 record in his three seasons. After leaving Central Missouri, Molde coached at Eastern Illinois, followed by Division I Western Michigan.

==== Mules in the pros ====
- Jeff Wright – DT – Drafted by the Buffalo Bills in round 8 of the 1988 NFL draft. Played through 1994 and started at nose tackle in four Super Bowls.
- Colston Weatherington – DE – Drafted in the seventh round of the 2001 NFL draft by the Dallas Cowboys. He was released by the Cowboys in 2003, but signed as a free agent with the Dallas Desperados of the Arena Football League. He was named Defensive Lineman of the Year for the AFL in 2006 and in 2008.
- Toby Korrodi – QB – Signed as an undrafted free agent by the Arizona Cardinals immediately after the 2007 NFL draft. Currently a free agent after being released in August 2007.
- Roderick Green – OLB – Selected by the Baltimore Ravens in the fifth round of the 2004 NFL draft, the highest any UCM football player has ever been drafted. Green played with the San Francisco 49ers in 2006, where he had 4.5 sacks as a pass-rush specialist.
- Delanie Walker – TE – Selected as the sixth pick of the sixth round in the 2006 NFL draft by the San Francisco 49ers.
- Todd Devoe – WR – Signed onto the Baltimore Ravens practice squad in 2003. Also spent time on the practice squads of the Tennessee Titans and Miami Dolphins. In 2005, he signed with the Denver Broncos and had nine catches, including one touchdown.

Jennie's Soccer

The Jennie's completed a perfect season going 27–0 during the 2017 season. They went on to win their first soccer championship winning in penalty kicks.
