= List of NCAA Division I conference changes in the 2010s =

National Collegiate Athletic Association logo

In the 2010s, many college or university athletic programs have changed membership from one National Collegiate Athletic Association athletic conference to another.

== 2019–2020 ==
Note

- Because of the COVID-19 pandemic, schools that made conference moves affecting only spring sports were unable to complete their first seasons in the new league, or in some cases to even play said seasons.

School	Sport(s)	Former Conference	New Conference
Abilene Christian Wildcats	Beach volleyball	Independent	Southland
Akron Zips	Baseball	No team	MAC
Akron Zips	Women's lacrosse	No team	ASUN
Augustana (IL) Vikings (Note: This school is an NCAA Division III member. Bowling, a women-only sport at the NCAA level, has a single national championship for all three NCAA divisions.)	Bowling	Independent	CIBC (Note: The Central Intercollegiate Bowling Conference was an NCAA Division III league, but its bowling schools competed alongside Division I and Division II members for a single national championship in that sport.)
Aurora Spartans	Bowling	Independent	CIBC
Austin Peay Governors	Beach volleyball	Independent	OVC
Bloomsburg Huskies (Note: This school is a Division II member, but has long competed in Division I wrestling.)	Wrestling	EWL	MAC
Boise State Broncos	Baseball	No team	Mountain West
Bryant Bulldogs	Field hockey	MAAC	NEC
Central Arkansas Bears	Men's soccer	MVC	Sun Belt
Central Arkansas Sugar Bears	Beach volleyball	Independent	Southland
Central Missouri Jennies (Note: This school is an NCAA Division II member. Bowling, a women-only sport at the NCAA level, has a single national championship for all three NCAA divisions. In that sport, Division II members are allowed to award the same number of full scholarship equivalents as Division I institutions.)	Bowling	MIAA (D-II)	GLVC (Note: The Great Lakes Valley Conference, which added bowling for 2019–20, is an NCAA Division II league, but its bowling schools compete alongside Division I and Division III members for a single national championship in that sport.)
Chattanooga Mocs	Beach volleyball	No team	OVC
Clarion Golden Eagles	Wrestling	EWL	MAC
Clemson Tigers	Softball	No team	ACC
Cleveland State Vikings	Wrestling	EWL	MAC
Delaware Valley Aggies (Note: Delaware Valley is a Division III member. Fencing has a single NCAA championship open to members of all three divisions.)	Fencing	No team	Independent
Drury Panthers	Bowling	MIAA (D-II)	GLVC
Eastern Kentucky Colonels	Beach volleyball	Independent	OVC
Edinboro Fighting Scots	Wrestling	EWL	MAC
Elmhurst Blue Jays	Bowling	MIAA (D-II)	CIBC
Fairfield Stags	Field hockey	MAAC	NEC
Franklin Pierce Ravens	Women's ice hockey	Independent	NEWHA (Note: The New England Women's Hockey Alliance, formed in 2017 as a scheduling alliance between the then-current Division I and Division II women's ice hockey independents, was officially recognized as an NCAA conference effective with the 2019–20 season.)
George Mason Patriots	Wrestling	EWL	MAC
Hampton Pirates	Football	Division I FCS independent	Big South
Houston Baptist Huskies	Beach volleyball	Independent	Southland
Jacksonville State Gamecocks	Beach volleyball	Independent	OVC
Lewis Flyers	Bowling	Independent	GLVC
Lincoln (MO) Blue Tigers	Bowling	MIAA (D-II)	GLVC
Little Rock Trojans	Wrestling	No team	Pac-12
LIU Sharks (Note: After the 2018–19 school year, Long Island University merged the athletic programs of its two campuses—Division I LIU Brooklyn and Division II LIU Post—into a single Division I program under the LIU name. All varsity sports previously sponsored by either campus continued to be sponsored by the new LIU program, which inherited LIU Brooklyn's Division I and Northeast Conference memberships. The new nickname of Sharks was announced on May 15, 2019.)	Men's cross country (Note: At the time LIU announced its athletic merger, this sport was sponsored by LIU Post but not LIU Brooklyn.)	ECC (Division II)	NEC
LIU Sharks	Women's fencing	Independent (Division II)	Independent
LIU Sharks	Field hockey	MAAC	NEC
LIU Sharks (Note: LIU Brooklyn announced that it would add women's ice hockey shortly before the LIU athletic merger was announced.)	Women's ice hockey	No team	NEWHA (Note: When LIU Brooklyn announced that it would add women's hockey, it announced that it would join the New England Women's Hockey Alliance, which was a scheduling agreement between all of the then-current Division I and Division II independents in the sport. The NEWHA officially organized as a conference in 2018, and received official NCAA recognition for 2019–20 and beyond.)
LIU Sharks	Football	NE10 (Division II)	NEC
LIU Sharks	Men's lacrosse	ECC (Division II)	NEC
LIU Sharks	Women's water polo	No team	MAAC
LIU Sharks	Wrestling	Independent (Division II)	EIWA
Lock Haven Bald Eagles	Wrestling	EWL	MAC
Louisiana–Monroe Warhawks	Beach volleyball	Independent	CCSA
Marian (WI) Sabres	Bowling	Independent	CIBC
Maryville (MO) Saints	Bowling	MIAA (D-II)	GLVC
UMass Lowell River Hawks	Women's volleyball	America East	Dropped women's volleyball
McKendree Bearcats	Bowling	MIAA (D-II)	GLVC
Merrimack Warriors	Full membership	NE10 (Division II)	NEC
Missouri State Lady Bears	Beach volleyball	Independent	CCSA
Monmouth Hawks	Field hockey	MAAC	AmEast
Morehead State Eagles	Beach volleyball	Independent	OVC
New Mexico Lobos	Beach volleyball	Independent	Dropped beach volleyball
New Mexico Lobos	Skiing	RMISA	Dropped skiing
New Mexico Lobos	Men's soccer	C-USA	Dropped men's soccer
NJIT Highlanders	Men's lacrosse	Independent	NEC
New Orleans Privateers	Beach volleyball	Independent	Southland
Nicholls Colonels	Beach volleyball	Independent	Southland
North Alabama Lions	Football	Division I FCS independent	Big South
North Central (IL) Cardinals	Bowling	Independent	CIBC
Pacific Tigers	Field hockey	America East	Dropped field hockey
Post Eagles	Women's ice hockey	Independent	NEWHA
Presbyterian Blue Hose	Wrestling	Division I independent	SoCon
Purdue Fort Wayne Mastodons	Men's indoor and outdoor track & field	No teams	Summit
Rider Broncs	Field hockey	MAAC	NEC
Rider Broncs	Wrestling	EWL	MAC
Sacred Heart Pioneers	Field hockey	MAAC	NEC
Saint Anselm Hawks	Women's ice hockey	Independent	NEWHA
St. Francis Brooklyn Terriers	Women's soccer	No team	NEC
St. Francis Brooklyn Terriers	Men's volleyball	No team	Independent
Saint Michael's Purple Knights	Women's ice hockey	Independent	NEWHA
Sam Houston State Bearkats	Beach volleyball	No team	Southland
Savannah State Tigers and Lady Tigers	Full membership	MEAC	SIAC (Division II)
Southeastern Louisiana Lady Lions	Beach volleyball	No team	Southland
Stephen F. Austin Ladyjacks	Beach volleyball	No team	Southland
Tusculum Pioneers	Bowling	No team	ECC
Tusculum Pioneers (Note: This school is a Division II member. The NCAA organizes a joint national championship event open to D-I and D-II members, and scholarship limits are identical in both divisions.)	Men's volleyball	No team	Independent
UC San Diego Tritons (Note: At the time UC San Diego moved women's water polo to the Big West, it was a Division II member. Women's water polo has a single NCAA championship open to all NCAA member schools.)	Women's water polo	WWPA	Big West
UConn Huskies	Women's rowing	American	CAA
UMPI Owls	Skiing	EISA	USCSA (Note: USCSA is a collegiate sports federation separate from the NCAA.)
Upper Iowa Peacocks	Bowling	Independent	GLVC
UT Martin Skyhawks	Beach volleyball	Independent	OVC
Wagner Seahawks	Field hockey	Club team	NEC
Wisconsin–Whitewater Warhawks	Bowling	Independent	CIBC

== 2018–2019 ==
School	Sport(s)	Former Conference	New Conference
Belmont Bruins	Men's soccer	Horizon	SoCon
Bloomfield Bears	Bowling	No team	ECC (Division II)
Caldwell Cougars	Bowling	NEC	ECC (Division II)
California Baptist Lancers	Full membership	PacWest (Division II)	WAC
Campbell Fighting Camels	Football	Pioneer League	Big South
Cincinnati Bearcats	Women's lacrosse	Big East	The American
Connecticut Huskies	Women's lacrosse	Big East	The American
Daemen Wildcats	Men's volleyball	No team	Independent
East Carolina Pirates	Women's lacrosse	Independent	The American
Eastern Kentucky Colonels	Men's and women's tennis	OVC	Dropped tennis
Eastern Michigan Eagles	Softball, men's swimming & diving, women's tennis, wrestling	MAC	Dropped all four sports
Florida Gators	Women's lacrosse	Big East	The American
Hampton Pirates	Full membership (except football)	MEAC	Big South (Note: At the time Hampton's Big South move was announced, it was not certain whether Hampton football would immediately move to the Big South; the conference stated that Hampton would start Big South football play "no later than 2019.")
Hampton Pirates	Football	MEAC	Division I FCS independent
Hartwick Hawks (Note: Hartwick is an NCAA Division III member, but was one of a small number of schools that had been specifically allowed to award scholarships in one men's and one women's sport as a Division I member. Hartwick's former "D-I" women's sport of water polo has only one national championship for all three NCAA divisions.)	Men's soccer	Sun Belt	Empire 8 (Division III)
Hartwick Hawks	Women's water polo	CWPA	Dropped women's water polo
Holy Cross Crusaders	Women's ice hockey	Independent (Note: Although an independent, Holy Cross was part of the New England Women's Hockey Alliance, then a scheduling agreement among several independent Division I and Division II ice hockey teams.)	Hockey East
Idaho Vandals	Football	Sun Belt	Big Sky
Indiana Hoosiers	Women's water polo	CWPA	MPSF
Kent State Golden Flashes	Women's lacrosse	No team	ASUN
Kentucky Wesleyan Panthers	Bowling	No team	Independent
Lewis Flyers	Bowling	No team	Independent
Liberty Flames	Football	Big South	Division I FBS independent
Liberty Flames	Full membership (except football, field hockey and women's swimming & diving)	Big South	ASUN
Monmouth Hawks	Bowling	Southland Bowling	MEAC
Mount St. Mary's Mountaineers	Men's soccer	No team	NEC
New Mexico State Aggies	Football	Sun Belt	Division I FBS independent
North Alabama Lions	Full membership (except football)	Gulf South (Division II)	ASUN
North Alabama Lions	Football	Gulf South (Division II)	Division I FCS independent
North Dakota Fighting Hawks	Full membership (except football)	Big Sky	Summit League
North Dakota Fighting Hawks	Football	Big Sky	Division I FCS independent
Old Dominion Monarchs	Women's lacrosse	ASUN	Big East
Old Dominion Monarchs	Women's rowing	Big 12	The American
Presbyterian Blue Hose	Wrestling	No team	Division I independent
St. Bonaventure Bonnies	Men's lacrosse	Club team	MAAC
Saint Peter's Peahens	Bowling	Independent	Dropped bowling
Saint Peter's Peacocks & Peahens	Men's and women's tennis	MAAC	Dropped tennis
Saint Vincent Bearcats	Bowling	Independent	AMCC (Note: The Allegheny Mountain Collegiate Conference is an NCAA Division III league, but its bowling schools compete alongside Division I and Division II members for a single national championship in that sport.)
Salem Tigers (Note: This school is an NCAA Division II member. Women's water polo has a single national championship for all divisions. In that sport, Division II members are allowed to award the same number of full scholarship equivalents as Division I institutions.)	Women's water polo	Club team	WWPA
Siena Saints	Field hockey	MAAC	Dropped field hockey
SIU Edwardsville Cougars	Wrestling	SoCon	MAC
Southern Miss Lady Eagles	Beach volleyball	No team	CCSA
TCU Horned Frogs	Beach volleyball	Independent	CCSA
Temple Owls	Women's lacrosse	Big East	The American
UAB Blazers	Bowling	Independent	MEAC
Urbana Blue Knights	Men's volleyball	No team	Independent
USC Upstate Spartans	Full membership (non-football)	ASUN	Big South
Utah Utes	Men's lacrosse	Club team	Independent
Vanderbilt Commodores	Women's lacrosse	Big East	The American
Walsh Cavaliers	Bowling	No team	Independent
Wittenberg Tigers (Note: This school is an NCAA Division III member. Women's water polo has a single national championship for all divisions.)	Women's water polo	No team	CWPA
Youngstown State Penguins	Bowling	Independent	Southland Bowling

== 2017–2018 ==
School	Sport(s)	Former Conference	New Conference
Appalachian State Mountaineers	Field hockey	Independent	MAC
Arizona State Sun Devils	Men's tennis	No team	Pac-12
Arizona State Sun Devils	Women's lacrosse	Club team	Pac-12
Augustana (IL) Vikings	Bowling	No team	Independent
Binghamton Bearcats	Men's swimming & diving	Independent	America East
Boise State Broncos	Wrestling	Pac-12	Dropped wrestling
Buffalo Bulls	Women's rowing	CAA	Dropped women's rowing
Buffalo Bulls	Baseball, men's soccer, men's swimming & diving	MAC	Dropped all three sports
Cal State Bakersfield Roadrunners	Men's golf	WAC	Dropped men's golf
Cal State Bakersfield Roadrunners	Women's water polo	MPSF	Dropped women's water polo
Cal State Northridge Matadors	Men's volleyball	MPSF	Big West
California Golden Bears	Women's lacrosse	MPSF	Pac-12
California Baptist Lancers	Men's volleyball	MPSF	Dropped men's volleyball
Central Michigan Chippewas	Women's lacrosse	ASUN	SoCon
Charlotte 49ers	Women's golf	No team	C-USA
Clemson Tigers	Women's diving (Note: The NCAA considers swimming and diving to be a single sport. Following the 2011–12 school year, Clemson almost completely eliminated its program in that sport, dropping the entire sport for men and also dropping women's swimming. Only women's diving was retained.)	ACC	Dropped women's diving
Coastal Carolina Chanticleers	Football	Division I FCS independent	Sun Belt
Colorado Buffaloes	Women's lacrosse	MPSF	Pac-12
Concordia–Irvine Eagles	Men's volleyball	Independent	MPSF
Delaware State Hornets	Women's lacrosse	ASUN	SoCon
Detroit Titans	Women's lacrosse	ASUN	SoCon
Drake Bulldogs	Men's tennis	MVC	Summit League
Duke Blue Devils	Softball	No team	ACC
East Carolina Pirates	Women's lacrosse	Club team	Independent
Evansville Purple Aces	Men's and women's indoor and outdoor track & field	No teams	MVC
Fresno Pacific Sunbirds	Women's water polo	Golden Coast	WWPA
Fresno State Bulldogs	Women's water polo	Independent	Golden Coast
Fresno State Bulldogs	Wrestling	Club team	Big 12
Furman Paladins	Women's lacrosse	ASUN	SoCon
Grand Canyon Antelopes	Men's volleyball	MIVA	MPSF
Hartford Hawks	Women's lacrosse	Club team	America East
Hawaiʻi Rainbow Warriors	Men's volleyball	MPSF	Big West
Illinois State Redbirds	Men's tennis	MVC	Summit League
IUPUI Jaguars	Full membership	Summit League	Horizon
Kansas State Wildcats	Women's soccer	Independent	Big 12
Long Beach State 49ers	Men's volleyball	MPSF	Big West
Maine Black Bears	Men's swimming & diving	Independent	America East
McKendree Bearcats (Note: This school is an NCAA Division II member. Men's water polo has a single national championship for all divisions. In that sport, Division II members are allowed to award the same number of full scholarship equivalents as Division I institutions.)	Men's water polo	Club team (CWPA)	CWPA (varsity division)
McKendree Bearcats	Women's water polo	Club team (CWPA)	WWPA
Mercer Bears	Women's lacrosse	ASUN	SoCon
Missouri State Lady Bears	Beach volleyball	No team	Independent
Missouri State Lady Bears	Field hockey	MAC	Dropped field hockey
North Dakota Fighting Hawks	Men's and women's swimming & diving	WAC	Dropped swimming & diving
North Dakota Fighting Hawks	Women's ice hockey	WCHA	Dropped women's ice hockey
Northern Iowa Panthers	Wrestling	MAC	Big 12
Notre Dame Fighting Irish	Men's ice hockey	Hockey East	Big Ten
NYIT Bears	Baseball	Independent	East Coast (Division II)
Oregon Ducks	Women's lacrosse	MPSF	Pac-12
Pfeiffer Falcons (Note: At the time Pfeiffer dropped men's volleyball, it was an NCAA Division II member and thus eligible to compete in the sport's combined Division I/II national championship, but had announced that it would transition to NCAA Division III starting with the 2017–18 school year. The school dropped men's volleyball due to a lack of D-III men's volleyball schools in its region.)	Men's volleyball	Conference Carolinas	Dropped men's volleyball
Queens (NC) Royals	Men's volleyball	Club team	Independent
St. Thomas Aquinas Spartans	Bowling	No team	ECC (Division II)
Saint Vincent Bearcats	Bowling	No team	Independent
SIU Edwardsville Cougars	Men's soccer	MVC	MAC
Southern Illinois Salukis	Men's and women's tennis	MVC	Dropped tennis
Stanford Cardinal	Women's lacrosse	MPSF	Pac-12
Stony Brook Seawolves	Men's tennis	MVC	Dropped men's tennis
UAB Blazers	Football	No team	C-USA
UC Irvine Anteaters	Men's volleyball	MPSF	Big West
UC San Diego Tritons	Men's volleyball	MPSF	Big West
UC Santa Barbara Gauchos	Men's volleyball	MPSF	Big West
UMBC Retrievers	Men's swimming & diving	CCSA	America East
USC Trojans	Women's lacrosse	MPSF	Pac-12
UT Arlington Mavericks	Women's golf	No team	Sun Belt
Valparaiso Crusaders	Full membership (except football)	Horizon	MVC
Valparaiso Crusaders	Men's swimming, (Note: Valparaiso does not include divers in its men's swimming & diving program.) men's tennis	Horizon	Summit League
VMI Keydets	Men's and women's swimming & diving	CCSA	America East
Wichita State Shockers	Full membership (non-football)	MVC	The American
Wofford Terriers	Women's lacrosse	No team	SoCon

== 2016–2017 ==
School	Sport(s)	Former Conference	New Conference
Albany Great Danes	Women's tennis	America East	Dropped women's tennis
Butler Bulldogs	Women's lacrosse	Club team	Big East
Charleston Cougars	Beach volleyball	Independent	CCSA
The Citadel Bulldogs	Rifle	Independent/SEARC	SoCon
Cleveland State Vikings	Men's lacrosse	Club team	Independent
Coastal Carolina Chanticleers	Full membership (initially non-football)	Big South	Sun Belt
Coastal Carolina Chanticleers	Football	Big South	Division I FCS independent
Coastal Carolina Chanticleers	Women's lacrosse	Big South	Atlantic Sun
Delaware State Hornets	Women's lacrosse	Independent	Atlantic Sun
Denver Pioneers	Women's lacrosse	MPSF	Big East
Duquesne Dukes	Bowling	No team	NEC
East Tennessee State Buccaneers	Football	Division I FCS independent	SoCon
Fresno State Bulldogs	Women's water polo	Club team	Independent
Georgia Southern Eagles	Rifle	Independent/SEARC	SoCon
Hampton Pirates and Lady Pirates	Men's lacrosse, women's soccer	No teams	Independent
Hartford Hawks	Men's tennis	MVC	Dropped tennis
Hartford Hawks	Women's tennis	America East	Dropped tennis
Johns Hopkins Blue Jays	Women's lacrosse	Independent	Big Ten
Kansas State Wildcats	Women's soccer	No team	Independent
La Salle Explorers	Men's water polo	Club team	CWPA
La Salle Explorers	Women's golf, women's water polo	No golf team; club water polo team	MAAC
Liberty Lady Flames	Field hockey	Independent	Big East
Lincoln Memorial Railsplitters	Men's volleyball	Club team	Independent
LIU Brooklyn Blackbirds	Field hockey	No team	MAAC (Note: Although LIU Brooklyn initially announced that it would start varsity field hockey in 2015, the team did not actually debut until 2016.)
Long Beach State 49ers	Men's water polo	MPSF	Golden Coast
Massachusetts Minutemen	Football	MAC	Division I FBS independent
Morehead State Eagles	Beach volleyball	No team	Independent
Morehead State Eagles	Women's indoor track & field	No team	OVC
Morehead State Eagles	Men's and women's tennis	OVC	Dropped both sports
NJIT Highlanders	Men's soccer	Sun Belt	Atlantic Sun
North Dakota Fighting Hawks	Baseball	WAC	Dropped baseball
North Dakota Fighting Hawks	Men's golf	Big Sky	Dropped men's golf
North Georgia Nighthawks	Rifle	Independent/SEARC	SoCon
Pacific Tigers	Men's water polo	MPSF	Golden Coast
Pepperdine Waves	Men's water polo	MPSF	Golden Coast
Quinnipiac Bobcats	Field hockey	MAAC	Big East
Saint Francis Red Flash	Women's water polo	Club team	CWPA
San Jose State Spartans	Men's water polo	MPSF	Golden Coast
Stony Brook Seawolves	Women's tennis	America East	MVC
UAB Blazers	Bowling	No team	Independent
UAB Blazers	Rifle	Independent	SoCon
UC Irvine Anteaters	Men's water polo	MPSF	Golden Coast
UC Santa Barbara Gauchos	Men's water polo	MPSF	Golden Coast
UMBC Retrievers	Men's tennis	MVC	Dropped tennis
UMBC Retrievers	Women's tennis	America East	Dropped tennis
UNC Wilmington Seahawks	Beach volleyball	Independent	CCSA
VMI Keydets	Rifle	Mid-Atlantic Rifle	SoCon
Wagner Seahawks	Men's water polo	Club team	CWPA
Wagner Seahawks	Women's fencing	No team	Independent
Wofford Terriers	Rifle	Independent/SEARC	SoCon
Youngstown State Penguins	Bowling	No team	Independent

== 2015–2016 ==
School	Sport(s)	Former Conference	New Conference
Air Force Falcons	Men's lacrosse	Independent	SoCon
Air Force Falcons	Wrestling	WWC	Big 12
Akron Zips	Baseball	MAC	Dropped baseball
Alderson Broaddus Battlers	Men's volleyball	Club team	Independent
Appalachian State Mountaineers	Field hockey	NorPac	Independent
Arizona Wildcats	Beach volleyball	Independent	Pac-12
Arizona State Sun Devils	Beach volleyball	Independent	Pac-12
Arizona State Sun Devils	Men's ice hockey	Club team	Independent
Army Black Knights	Women's lacrosse	Club team	Patriot League
Cal Poly Mustangs	Beach volleyball	Independent	Big West
Cal State Northridge Matadors	Beach volleyball	Independent	Big West
California Golden Bears	Beach volleyball	Independent	Pac-12
California Golden Bears	Field hockey	NorPac	America East
Central Michigan Chippewas	Women's lacrosse	Club team	Atlantic Sun
Charleston (WV) Golden Eagles	Men's volleyball	Independent	EIVA
Charlotte 49ers	Football	Division I FCS independent	C-USA
Coastal Carolina Chanticleers	Beach volleyball	No team	Atlantic Sun
Columbus State Cougars	Rifle	OVC	Dropped rifle
CSU Bakersfield Roadrunners	Beach volleyball	Independent	Big West
Denver Pioneers	Women's gymnastics	MRGC	Big 12
East Tennessee State Buccaneers	Football	No team	Division I FCS independent
Fairfield Stags	Field hockey	America East	MAAC
FIU Panthers	Beach volleyball	Independent	CCSA
Florida Atlantic Owls	Beach volleyball, men's swimming & diving	Independent	CCSA
Florida State Seminoles	Beach volleyball	Independent	CCSA
Georgia State Panthers	Beach volleyball	Independent	CCSA
Hawaiʻi Rainbow Wahine	Beach volleyball	Independent	Big West
Kennesaw State Owls	Football	No team	Big South
Liberty Lady Flames	Field hockey	NorPac	Independent
Long Beach State 49ers	Beach volleyball	Independent	Big West
Loyola Marymount Lions	Beach volleyball	Independent	WCC
LSU Tigers	Beach volleyball	Independent	CCSA
Mercyhurst Lakers	Women's water polo	CWPA	WWPA
Merrimack Warriors	Women's ice hockey	Club team	Hockey East
Murray State Racers	Men's tennis	OVC	Dropped men's tennis
Navy Midshipmen	Football	Division I FBS Independent	The American
New Jersey City Gothic Knights	Bowling	Independent	AMCC
NJIT Highlanders	Full membership	Independent	Atlantic Sun
NJIT Highlanders	Women's tennis	America East	Atlantic Sun
North Dakota State Bison	Wrestling	WWC	Big 12
Northern Colorado Bears	Wrestling	WWC	Big 12
Northern Kentucky Norse	Full membership	Atlantic Sun	Horizon
Old Dominion Monarchs	Men's swimming & diving	Independent	CCSA
Oregon Ducks	Beach volleyball	Independent	Pac-12
Pacific Tigers	Field hockey	NorPac	America East
Pacific Tigers	Beach volleyball	Independent	WCC
Pepperdine Waves	Beach volleyball	Independent	WCC
Portland Pilots	Beach volleyball	No team	WCC
Radford Highlanders	Women's lacrosse	Club team	Big South
Saint Mary's Gaels	Beach volleyball	Independent	WCC
San Francisco Dons	Beach volleyball	Independent	WCC
Santa Clara Broncos	Beach volleyball	Independent	WCC
South Carolina Gamecocks	Beach volleyball	Independent	CCSA
South Dakota State Jackrabbits	Wrestling	WWC	Big 12
Stanford Cardinal	Beach volleyball	Independent	Pac-12
Stanford Cardinal	Field hockey	NorPac	America East
Tulane Green Wave	Beach volleyball	Independent	CCSA
UAB Blazers	Football	C-USA	Dropped football
UAB Blazers	Beach volleyball	Independent	CCSA
UAB Blazers	Bowling	Independent	Dropped bowling (Note: Initially, UAB announced that it would also drop rifle. However, on July 21, 2015, the school announced that the rifle team would be immediately reinstated.)
UC Davis Aggies	Field hockey	NorPac	America East
UCLA Bruins	Beach volleyball	Independent	Pac-12
UNC Wilmington Seahawks	Beach volleyball	No team	Independent
USC Trojans	Beach volleyball	Independent	Pac-12
Utah Valley Wolverines	Wrestling	WWC	Big 12
UTRGV Vaqueros (Note: The University of Texas Rio Grande Valley (UTRGV) entered full operation on July 1, 2015, with the merger of the University of Texas–Pan American (UTPA) and the University of Texas at Brownsville. About a year before the merger, the University of Texas System announced that the UTPA athletic program would be converted to that of UTRGV, and the new nickname of Vaqueros was announced in November 2014.)	Men's soccer	No team	WAC
Villanova Wildcats	Women's rowing	The American	CAA
Washington Huskies	Beach volleyball	Independent	Pac-12
West Virginia Mountaineers	Men's golf	No team	Big 12
Western Kentucky Hilltoppers and Lady Toppers	Men's and women's swimming & diving	C-USA	Dropped both sports
Wyoming Cowboys	Wrestling	WWC	Big 12

== 2014–2015 ==
School	Sport(s)	Former Conference	New Conference
Abilene Christian Wildcats	Football	Division I FCS independent	Southland
Alabama Crimson Tide	Women's rowing	C-USA	Big 12
Appalachian State Mountaineers	Full membership	SoCon	Sun Belt
Arkansas State Red Wolves	Bowling	Independent	Southland Bowling (Note: The Southland Bowling League was formally established on January 20, 2015, but competition began immediately, with only a conference tournament in its inaugural 2014–15 season. The SBL is administratively supported by the Southland Conference, but operates as a separate single-sport conference.)
Bellarmine Knights	Men's lacrosse	ECAC Lacrosse	SoCon (Note: Bellarmine initially announced that it would join the ASUN Conference for men's lacrosse. On January 9, 2014, the A-Sun and Southern Conference announced a lacrosse alliance that would see the SoCon take over sponsorship of men's lacrosse from the A-Sun effective with the 2014–15 school year (2015 season).)
Belmont Bruins	Men's soccer	Independent	Horizon League
Binghamton Bearcats	Men's golf	America Sky	Big Sky
Binghamton Bearcats	Men's tennis	America East	MAC
Boston College Eagles	Fencing	IFA	ACC
Boston University Terriers	Wrestling	EIWA	Dropped wrestling
Caldwell Cougars	Bowling	No team	NEC
Cal State San Bernardino Coyotes	Women's water polo	WWPA	Dropped women's water polo
Charleston (WV) Golden Eagles	Men's volleyball	Club team	Independent
Chicago State Cougars	Women's soccer	No team	WAC
Colorado College Tigers (Note: Colorado College is an NCAA Division III member that fields Division I teams in men's ice hockey and women's soccer. The school is one of six D-III members that is specifically allowed to award scholarships in its Division I sports, a practice otherwise prohibited in Division III.)	Women's soccer	C-USA	Mountain West
Connecticut Huskies	Men's ice hockey	Atlantic Hockey	Hockey East
Davidson Wildcats	Full membership	SoCon	Atlantic 10
Davidson Wildcats	Field hockey	NorPac	Atlantic 10
Davidson Wildcats	Men's and women's swimming and diving	CCSA	Atlantic 10
Davidson Wildcats	Women's lacrosse	Big South	Atlantic 10
Duke Blue Devils	Fencing	Independent	ACC
East Carolina Pirates	Full membership	Conference USA	The American
East Tennessee State Buccaneers	Full membership (non-football)	Atlantic Sun	SoCon
Elon Phoenix	Full membership	SoCon	CAA
Fairfield Stags	Men's lacrosse	ECAC Lacrosse	CAA
Florida Gators	Women's lacrosse	ALC	Big East
Furman Paladins	Men's lacrosse	Atlantic Sun	SoCon
Gannon Golden Knights	Women's water polo	CWPA	WWPA
Georgia Regents Jaguars (Note: Georgia Regents, now known as Augusta, was and still is an NCAA Division II member, but competes in Division I men's and women's golf.)	Men's golf	Independent	MEAC
Georgia Southern Eagles	Full membership	SoCon	Sun Belt
Georgia State Panthers	Men's soccer	Independent	Sun Belt
Hartford Hawks	Men's golf	America Sky	Big Sky
Hartwick Hawks	Men's soccer	MAC	Sun Belt
High Point Panthers	Men's lacrosse	Atlantic Sun	SoCon
Houston Baptist Huskies	Football	Division I FCS Independent	Southland
Howard Bison	Men's soccer	Independent	Sun Belt
Howard Lady Bison	Women's soccer	Independent	SWAC
Idaho Vandals	Full membership (except football)	WAC	Big Sky
Idaho Vandals	Football	Division I FBS independent	Sun Belt
Incarnate Word Cardinals	Football	Division I FCS independent	Southland
Incarnate Word Cardinals	Men's soccer	Independent	WAC
Jacksonville Dolphins	Men's lacrosse	Atlantic Sun	SoCon
Johns Hopkins Blue Jays	Men's lacrosse	Independent	Big Ten
Johns Hopkins Blue Jays	Women's lacrosse	ALC	Independent
Kansas Jayhawks	Women's rowing	Big 12 & C-USA	Big 12 only
Kansas State Wildcats	Women's rowing	Big 12 & C-USA	Big 12 only
Longwood Lancers	Field hockey	NorPac	MAC
Louisiana Tech Lady Techsters	Bowling	Independent	Southland Bowling
Louisville Cardinals	Full membership	The American	ACC
Louisville Cardinals	Field hockey, women's lacrosse	Big East	ACC
Maryland Terrapins	Full membership	ACC	Big Ten
McKendree Bearcats	Men's volleyball	Independent	MIVA
Mercer Bears	Full membership	Atlantic Sun	SoCon
Mercer Bears	Football	Pioneer	SoCon
Mercer Bears	Women's lacrosse	No team	Atlantic Sun
Mercer Bears	Women's track and field	No team	SoCon
Michigan Wolverines	Men's lacrosse	ECAC Lacrosse	Big Ten
Michigan Wolverines	Women's lacrosse	ALC	Big Ten
Monmouth Hawks	Football	Division I FCS independent	Big South
Monmouth Hawks	Bowling	Independent	Southland Bowling
Montana Grizzlies	Softball	No team	Big Sky
New Mexico State Aggies	Football	Division I FBS independent	Sun Belt
NJIT Highlanders	Men's lacrosse	Club team	Independent
NJIT Highlanders	Men's soccer	Independent	Sun Belt
North Carolina Tar Heels	Fencing	Independent	ACC
North Dakota (no nickname)	Men's golf	America Sky	Big Sky
Northern Colorado Bears	Men's golf	America Sky	Big Sky
Northwestern Wildcats	Women's lacrosse	ALC	Big Ten
Notre Dame Fighting Irish	Fencing	MFC	ACC
Ohio State Buckeyes	Men's lacrosse	ECAC Lacrosse	Big Ten
Ohio State Buckeyes	Women's lacrosse	ALC	Big Ten
Oklahoma Sooners	Women's rowing	Big 12 & C-USA	Big 12 only
Old Dominion Monarchs	Women's lacrosse	Independent	Atlantic Sun
Old Dominion Lady Monarchs	Women's rowing	C-USA	Big 12
Oral Roberts Golden Eagles	Full membership	Southland	The Summit
Pacific Tigers	Men's volleyball	MPSF	Dropped men's volleyball
Penn State Nittany Lions	Men's lacrosse	CAA	Big Ten
Penn State Nittany Lions	Women's lacrosse	ALC	Big Ten
Providence Friars	Women's volleyball	America East	Big East
Radford Highlanders	Field hockey	NorPac	Dropped field hockey
Radford Highlanders	Men's track and field (indoor & outdoor)	Big South	Dropped both sports
Radford Highlanders	Women's swimming and diving	CCSA	Dropped women's swimming and diving
Richmond Spiders	Men's lacrosse	Atlantic Sun	SoCon
Richmond Spiders	Women's golf	CAA	Patriot League
Robert Morris Colonials	Field hockey, men's cross country, men's and women's tennis, men's indoor and outdoor track & field, women's golf	NEC	Dropped all seven sports
Rutgers Scarlet Knights	Full membership	The American	Big Ten
Rutgers Scarlet Knights	Field hockey, men's and women's lacrosse	Big East	Big Ten
Rutgers–Newark Scarlet Raiders (Note: Rutgers–Newark is an NCAA Division III member, but had been specifically allowed to compete as a scholarship-granting Division I program in men's volleyball. The school began a transition to Division III men's volleyball in the 2010–11 school year (2011 season), and stopped awarding scholarships to incoming athletes at that time. The transition was completed after the 2014 season.)	Men's volleyball	EIVA	CVC (D-III)
Sacramento State Hornets	Men's golf	America Sky	Big Sky
Sacramento State Hornets	Women's rowing	C-USA	The American
Sam Houston State Bearkats	Bowling	Independent	Southland Bowling
San Diego State Aztecs	Women's rowing	C-USA	The American
Southern Utah Thunderbirds	Men's golf	America Sky	Big Sky
Stephen F. Austin Ladyjacks	Bowling	Independent	Southland Bowling
Temple Owls	Baseball, men's indoor and outdoor track & field, softball	The American	Dropped all four sports (Note: Temple initially announced it would also drop women's rowing and the non-NCAA sport of men's rowing. However, after the city of Philadelphia agreed to pay for the renovation of Temple's former boat house, the school announced that rowing would remain a varsity sport for both sexes.)
Temple Owls	Men's gymnastics	EIGL	Dropped men's gymnastics
Tennessee Lady Volunteers	Women's rowing	C-USA	Big 12
Texas Longhorns	Women's rowing	Big 12 & C-USA	Big 12 only
Texas–Pan American Broncs	Women's soccer	No team	WAC
Tulane Green Wave	Full membership	Conference USA	The American
Tulane Green Wave	Bowling	Independent	Southland Bowling
Tulsa Golden Hurricane	Full membership	Conference USA	The American
UMass Lowell River Hawks	Men's and women's lacrosse	Club teams	America East
Utah Valley Wolverines	Men's soccer	No team	WAC
Valparaiso Crusaders	Bowling	Independent	Southland Bowling
Vanderbilt Commodores	Women's lacrosse	ALC	Big East
Vanderbilt Commodores	Bowling	Independent	Southland Bowling
VMI Keydets	Full membership	Big South	SoCon
VMI Keydets	Men's lacrosse	Atlantic Sun	SoCon
Weber State Wildcats	Men's golf	America Sky	Big Sky
West Virginia Mountaineers	Women's rowing	Big 12 & C-USA	Big 12 only
WKU Hilltoppers	Full membership	Sun Belt	Conference USA
WKU Hilltoppers	Men's tennis	Sun Belt	Dropped men's tennis

== 2013–2014 ==
Note

- On February 28, 2013, it was reported that the seven Catholic schools that had announced plans to leave the Big East Conference (collectively called the "Catholic 7") would do so in July 2013, two years ahead of the original schedule, and would keep the "Big East" name. On April 3, the football-sponsoring conference that retained the charter of the original Big East announced that it would be called the American Athletic Conference (AAC or The American). Accordingly, the following convention is being used in the 2013–14 table:
  - Big East (1979–2013) — The conference as it existed before July 2013.
  - Big East (2013) — The new conference formed by the "Catholic 7" schools.

School	Sports(s)	Former Conference	New Conference
Abilene Christian Wildcats	Full membership	Lone Star (Division II)	Southland
Abilene Christian Wildcats	Football	Lone Star (Division II)	Division I FCS independent
Adelphi Panthers	Men's soccer	Division I independent	Northeast-10 (Division II)
Air Force Falcons	Men's soccer	MPSF	WAC
Air Force Falcons	Men's swimming & diving	MPSF	WAC
Air Force Falcons	Rifle	Independent	PRC
Alaska Nanooks	Men's ice hockey	CCHA	WCHA
Alaska Nanooks	Rifle	Independent	PRC
Albany Great Danes	Football	NEC	CAA Football (Note: CAA Football has been administered by the multi-sports Coastal Athletic Association (then the Colonial Athletic Association) since 2007, but is a separate entity.)
Azusa Pacific Cougars	Women's water polo	CWPA	Golden Coast
Binghamton Bearcats	Wrestling	CAA	EIWA
Boston University Terriers	Full membership	America East	Patriot League
Boston University Terriers	Wrestling	CAA	EIWA
Bowling Green Falcons	Men's ice hockey	CCHA	WCHA
BYU Cougars	Softball	PCSC	WCC
Butler Bulldogs	Full membership	Atlantic 10	Big East (2013)
California Baptist Lancers	Women's water polo	CWPA	Golden Coast
Charleston Cougars	Full membership	SoCon	CAA
Charleston Cougars	Men's and women's swimming & diving	CCSA	CAA
Charlotte 49ers	Full membership (Note: Charlotte initially joined Conference USA as a full but non-football member. The football team, which started play in 2013, joined in 2015.)	Atlantic 10	Conference USA
Charlotte 49ers	Football	No team	Division I FCS Independent
Chicago State Cougars	Full membership	Great West	WAC
Chicago State Cougars	Men's golf	America Sky	WAC
Cincinnati Bearcats	Women's lacrosse	Big East (1979–2013)	Big East (2013)
Colorado Buffaloes	Women's lacrosse	Club team	MPSF
Colorado College Tigers	Men's ice hockey	WCHA	NCHC
Creighton Bluejays	Full membership	MVC	Big East (2013)
CSU Bakersfield Roadrunners	Full membership	Independent	WAC
CSU Bakersfield Roadrunners	Men's golf	America Sky	WAC
CSU Bakersfield Roadrunners	Men's soccer	MPSF	WAC
CSU Bakersfield Roadrunners	Softball	PCSC	WAC
CSU Bakersfield Roadrunners	Men's swimming & diving	MPSF	WAC
Dallas Baptist Patriots (Note: Dallas Baptist is an NCAA Division II member, but competes in Division I baseball.)	Baseball	WAC	MVC
Denver Pioneers	Full membership	WAC	The Summit
Denver Pioneers	Men's ice hockey	WCHA	NCHC
Denver Pioneers	Men's lacrosse	ECAC Lacrosse	Big East (2013)
Denver Pioneers	Men's soccer	MPSF	The Summit
Denver Pioneers	Men's and women's swimming & diving	MPSF	The Summit
DePaul Blue Demons	Full membership	Big East (1979–2013)	Big East (2013)
Drexel Dragons	Wrestling	CAA	EIWA
Ferris State Bulldogs	Men's ice hockey	CCHA	WCHA
Florida Atlantic Owls	Full membership	Sun Belt	Conference USA
Florida Atlantic Owls	Men's soccer	MAC	Conference USA
FIU Panthers	Full membership	Sun Belt	Conference USA
Fresno Pacific Sunbirds	Women's water polo	CWPA	Golden Coast
Furman Paladins	Men's lacrosse	Club team	Atlantic Sun
George Mason Patriots	Full membership	CAA	Atlantic 10
George Mason Patriots	Wrestling	CAA	EWL
Georgetown Hoyas	Full membership	Big East (1979–2013)	Big East (2013)
Georgia State Panthers	Full membership	CAA	Sun Belt
Georgia State Panthers	Men's soccer	CAA	Division I independent
Grand Canyon Antelopes	Full membership	PacWest (Division II)	WAC
High Point Panthers	Men's lacrosse	Independent	Atlantic Sun
Hobart Statesmen	Men's lacrosse	ECAC Lacrosse	NEC
Hofstra Pride	Wrestling	CAA	EIWA
Houston Cougars	Full membership	Conference USA	American
Houston Cougars	Women's golf	No team	American
Houston Baptist Huskies	Full membership	Great West	Southland
Houston Baptist Huskies	Men's gplf	America Sky	Southland
Houston Baptist Huskies	Men's soccer	MPSF	WAC
Idaho Vandals	Football	WAC	Division I FBS independent
Incarnate Word Cardinals	Full membership	Lone Star (Division II)	Southland
Incarnate Word Cardinals	Football	Lone Star (Division II)	Division I FCS independent
Incarnate Word Cardinals	Men's soccer	Lone Star (Division II)	Independent
Incarnate Word Cardinals	Men's and women's swimming & diving	Lone Star (Division II)	CCSA
Lake Superior State Lakers	Men's ice hockey	CCHA	WCHA
Louisiana Tech Bulldogs and Lady Techsters	Full membership	WAC	Conference USA
Louisville Cardinals	Field hockey, women's lacrosse	Big East (1979–2013)	Big East (2013)
Loyola Chicago Ramblers	Full membership	Horizon League	MVC
Loyola (MD) Greyhounds	Full membership	MAAC	Patriot League
Loyola (MD) Greyhounds	Men's lacrosse	ECAC Lacrosse	Patriot League
Loyola (MD) Greyhounds	Women's lacrosse	Big East (1979–2013)	Patriot League
Loyola Marymount Lions	Softball	PCSC	WCC
Loyola Marymount Lions	Women's water polo	WWPA	Golden Coast
Marquette Golden Eagles	Full membership	Big East (1979–2013)	Big East (2013)
Memphis Tigers	Full membership	Conference USA	American
Mercer Bears	Football	No team	Pioneer
Miami RedHawks	Men's ice hockey	CCHA	NCHC
Michigan Wolverines	Men's ice hockey	CCHA	Big Ten
Michigan State Spartans	Men's ice hockey	CCHA	Big Ten
Middle Tennessee Blue Raiders	Full membership	Sun Belt	Conference USA
Minnesota Golden Gophers	Men's ice hockey	WCHA	Big Ten
Minnesota-Duluth Bulldogs	Men's ice hockey	WCHA	NCHC
Monmouth Hawks	Full membership	NEC	MAAC
Monmouth Hawks	Football	NEC	Division I FCS independent
Mount St. Mary's Mountaineers	Men's and women's golf, men's soccer	NEC	Dropped all three sports
Nevada Wolf Pack	Rifle	Independent	PRC
New Jersey City Gothic Knights	Bowling	NEC	Independent
New Mexico Lobos	Men's soccer	MPSF	Conference USA
New Mexico State Aggies	Football	WAC	Division I FBS independent
New Orleans Privateers	Full membership	Independent	Southland
NJIT Highlanders	Men's swimming & diving	METS	CCSA
North Dakota (no nickname)	Baseball	Great West	WAC
North Dakota (no nickname)	Men's ice hockey	WCHA	NCHC
North Dakota (no nickname)	Men's swimming & diving	MPSF	WAC
Northern Colorado Bears	Baseball	Great West	WAC
Northern Michigan Wildcats	Men's ice hockey	CCHA	WCHA
North Texas Mean Green	Full membership	Sun Belt	Conference USA
Notre Dame Fighting Irish	Full membership (Note: While Notre Dame became a full ACC member, its football team has remained an FBS independent to this day. The ACC and Notre Dame have an extensive cross-scheduling arrangement in football.)	Big East (1979–2013)	ACC
Notre Dame Fighting Irish	Men's ice hockey	CCHA	Hockey East
Oakland Golden Grizzlies	Full membership	The Summit	Horizon League
Ohio State Buckeyes	Men's ice hockey	CCHA	Big Ten
Ohio State Buckeyes	Rifle	Independent	PRC
Old Dominion Monarchs	Full membership (Note: Old Dominion initially joined Conference USA as a full but non-football member. The football team, relaunched in 2013 after a decades-long absence, joined in 2014.)	CAA	Conference USA
Old Dominion Monarchs	Field hockey	CAA	Big East (2013)
Old Dominion Monarchs	Women's lacrosse	CAA	Independent
Old Dominion Monarchs	Wrestling	CAA	MAC
Omaha Mavericks	Men's ice hockey	WCHA	NCHC
Pacific Tigers	Full membership	Big West	West Coast
Pacific Tigers	Women's water polo	Big West	Golden Coast
Penn State Nittany Lions	Men's ice hockey	Division I Independent	Big Ten
Pittsburgh Panthers	Full membership	Big East (1979–2013)	ACC
Pittsburgh Panthers	Wrestling	EWL	ACC
Providence Friars	Full membership	Big East (1979–2013)	Big East (2013)
Quinnipiac Bobcats	Full membership	NEC	MAAC
Richmond Spiders	Men's lacrosse	Club team	Atlantic Sun
Richmond Spiders	Men's soccer, men's track and field	Atlantic 10	Dropped both sports
Rider Broncs	Wrestling	CAA	EWL
Rutgers Scarlet Knights	Field hockey, men's and women's lacrosse	Big East (1979–2013)	Big East (2013)
Sacramento State Hornets	Women's rowing	WIRA	Conference USA
St. Cloud State Huskies	Men's ice hockey	WCHA	NCHC
St. John's Red Storm	Full membership	Big East (1979–2013)	Big East (2013)
Saint Mary's Gaels	Softball	PCSC	WCC
San Diego Toreros	Softball	PCSC	WCC
San Diego State Aztecs	Women's rowing	WIRA	Conference USA
San Diego State Aztecs	Women's water polo	Big West	Golden Coast
San Jose State Spartans	Full membership	WAC	Mountain West
San Jose State Spartans	Men's soccer	MPSF	WAC
Santa Clara Broncos	Softball	PCSC	WCC
Santa Clara Broncos	Women's water polo	WWPA	Golden Coast
Seattle Redhawks	Men's soccer	MPSF	WAC
Seattle Redhawks	Men's swimming & diving	MPSF	WAC
Seton Hall Pirates	Full membership	Big East (1979–2013)	Big East (2013)
South Alabama Jaguars	Football	Division I FCS Independent	Sun Belt
SMU Mustangs	Full membership	Conference USA	American
Stetson Hatters	Football	No team	Pioneer
Stony Brook Seawolves	Football	Big South	CAA Football
Syracuse Orange	Full membership	Big East (1979–2013)	ACC
TCU Horned Frogs	Rifle	Independent	PRC
Temple Owls	Full membership	Atlantic 10	American
Temple Owls	Field hockey, women's lacrosse	Atlantic 10	Big East (2013)
Texas–Arlington Mavericks	Full membership	WAC	Sun Belt
Texas–Pan American Broncs	Full membership	Great West	WAC
Texas–Pan American Broncs	Men's golf	America Sky	WAC
Texas State Bobcats	Full membership	WAC	Sun Belt
Towson Tigers	Men's soccer	CAA	Dropped men's soccer
UAH Chargers	Men's ice hockey	Division I Independent	WCHA
UCF Knights	Full membership	Conference USA	American
UConn Huskies (Note: The 2013–14 school year was the first in which the University of Connecticut officially used "UConn" as its primary athletic brand.)	Field hockey, women's lacrosse	Big East (1979–2013)	Big East (2013)
UMass Lowell River Hawks	Full membership	Northeast-10 (Division II)	America East
UMBC Retrievers	Men's swimming & diving	America East	CCSA
UMKC Kangaroos	Full membership	The Summit	WAC
UNLV Rebels	Men's soccer	MPSF	WAC
UNLV Rebels	Men's swimming & diving	MPSF	WAC
Utah State Aggies	Full membership	WAC	Mountain West
Utah Valley Wolverines	Full membership	Great West	WAC
Utah Valley Wolverines	Men's golf	America Sky	WAC
Utah Valley Wolverines	Softball	PCSC	WAC
UTEP Miners	Rifle	Independent	PRC
UTSA Roadrunners	Full membership	WAC	Conference USA
Villanova Wildcats	Full membership	Big East (1979–2013)	Big East (2013)
VMI Keydets	Men's lacrosse	MAAC	Atlantic Sun
Western Michigan Broncos	Men's ice hockey	CCHA	NCHC
Wisconsin Badgers	Men's ice hockey	WCHA	Big Ten
Wyoming Cowboys	Men's swimming & diving	MPSF	WAC
Xavier Musketeers	Full membership	Atlantic 10	Big East (2013)

== 2012–2013 ==
School	Sport(s)	Former Conference	New Conference
Adelphi Panthers	Men's soccer	Atlantic Soccer	Independent
Alabama A&M Bulldogs	Men's soccer	Independent	Dropped men's soccer
Belmont Bruins	All sports (non-football)	Atlantic Sun	OVC
Belmont Bruins	Men's soccer	Atlantic Sun	Independent
Butler Bulldogs	All sports except football and women's golf	Horizon	Atlantic 10
Butler Bulldogs	Women's golf	Horizon	MAAC
BYU Cougars	Softball	WAC	PCSC
Cal Poly Mustangs	Football	Great West	Big Sky
Cal State Bakersfield Roadrunners	Baseball	Division I Independent	WAC
Campbell Lady Camels	Women's lacrosse	No team	Big South
Clemson Tigers	Men's and women's swimming & diving	ACC	Dropped all except women's diving
Columbus State Cougars	Rifle	Independent	OVC
Coastal Carolina Chanticleers	Women's lacrosse	No team	Big South
Dallas Baptist Patriots (Note: Dallas Baptist is an NCAA Division II member, but competes in Division I baseball.)	Baseball	Division I Independent	WAC
Davidson Wildcats	Women's lacrosse	National Lacrosse	Big South
Denver Pioneers	All sports (non-football)	Sun Belt	WAC
Detroit Titans	Women's lacrosse	National Lacrosse	Atlantic Sun
Fresno State Bulldogs	All sports	WAC	Mountain West
Hartwick Hawks	Men's soccer	Atlantic Soccer	MAC
Hawaiʻi (Rainbow) Warriors and Rainbow Wahine	All sports except football, women's indoor track and field, and swimming and diving for both sexes	WAC	Big West
Hawaiʻi Warriors	Football	WAC	Mountain West
Hawaiʻi Rainbow Wahine	Women's indoor track and field, and women's swimming and diving	WAC	MPSF
Hawaiʻi Rainbow Warriors	Men's swimming and diving	WAC	MPSF
High Point Panthers	Women's lacrosse	National Lacrosse	Big South
Houston Baptist Huskies	Men's soccer	Atlantic Soccer	MPSF
Howard Bison	Men's soccer	Atlantic Soccer	Independent
Howard Bison	Women's lacrosse	National Lacrosse	Atlantic Sun
Idaho State Bengals	Softball	PCSC	Big Sky
Jacksonville Dolphins	Women's lacrosse	National Lacrosse	Atlantic Sun
Kennesaw State Owls	Women's lacrosse	No team	Atlantic Sun
Liberty Lady Flames	Women's lacrosse	National Lacrosse	Big South
Lindenwood Lady Lions	Women's ice hockey	Division I Independent	CHA
Longwood Lancers	All sports (non-football) except men's soccer and women's lacrosse	Division I Independent	Big South
Longwood Lancers	Men's soccer	Atlantic Soccer	Big South
Longwood Lancers	Women's lacrosse	National Lacrosse	Big South
Maryland Terrapins	Men's and women's swimming, men's tennis, men's cross country, men's indoor track and field (Note: Maryland also dropped the non-NCAA sport of acrobatics and tumbling, which it had sponsored at a varsity level.)	ACC	Dropped all five sports
Maryland Terrapins	Women's water polo	CWPA	Dropped women's water polo
Massachusetts Minutemen	Football	CAA	MAC
Michigan Wolverines	Men's lacrosse	CCLA Division I (club lacrosse)	ECAC Lacrosse League
Missouri Tigers	All sports except wrestling	Big 12	SEC
Missouri Tigers	Wrestling	Big 12	MAC
Nebraska-Omaha Mavericks	All sports except hockey and baseball	MIAA (Division II)	The Summit
Nebraska-Omaha Mavericks	Baseball	Independent	The Summit
Nebraska-Omaha Mavericks	Men's soccer	No team	The Summit
Niagara Purple Eagles	Women's ice hockey	CHA	Dropped women's hockey
Nevada Wolf Pack	All sports	WAC	Mountain West
NJIT Highlanders	Men's soccer	ASC	Independent
North Dakota (no nickname)	All sports except hockey and baseball	Great West	Big Sky
Northern Colorado Bears	Softball	PCSC	Big Sky
Northern Iowa Panthers	Wrestling	WWC	MAC
Northern Kentucky Norse	All sports (non-football)	GLVC (Division II)	Atlantic Sun
Oral Roberts Golden Eagles	All sports (non-football) except men's soccer	The Summit	Southland
Penn State Nittany Lions	Men's ice hockey	ACHA Division 1 independent (club hockey)	Division I Independent
Penn State Nittany Lions	Women's ice hockey	ECWHL (ACHA Division 1, club hockey)	CHA
Portland State Vikings	Softball	PCSC	Big Sky
Presbyterian Blue Hose	Women's lacrosse	National Lacrosse	Big South
RIT Tigers	Women's ice hockey	ECAC West (D-III)	CHA
Sacramento State Hornets	Men's soccer	MPSF	Big West
Sacramento State Hornets	Softball	PCSC	Big Sky
San Diego State Aztecs	Women's water polo	MPSF	Big West
Seattle Redhawks	All sports (non-football)	Division I Independent	WAC
Seattle Redhawks	Softball	PCSC	WAC
Seattle Redhawks	Women's golf	WCC	WAC
South Dakota Coyotes	Football	Great West	MVFC
SIU Edwardsville Cougars	Wrestling	Division I independent	Southern
Southern Utah Thunderbirds	All sports except football	The Summit	Big Sky
Southern Utah Thunderbirds	Baseball	Great West	Dropped baseball
Southern Utah Thunderbirds	Football	Great West	Big Sky
Stetson Hatters	Women's lacrosse	No team	Atlantic Sun
TCU Horned Frogs	All sports	Mountain West	Big 12
Temple Owls	Football	MAC	Big East
Texas A&M Aggies	All sports	Big 12	SEC
Texas–Arlington Mavericks	All sports (non-football)	Southland	WAC
Texas State Bobcats	All sports except football	Southland	WAC
Texas State Bobcats	Football	Division I FCS Independent	WAC
UC Davis Aggies	Football	Great West	Big Sky
UNC Asheville Bulldogs	Women's swimming	No team	CCSA
USC Trojans	Women's lacrosse	(non-lacrosse)	MPSF
UTSA Roadrunners	All sports except football	Southland	WAC
UTSA Roadrunners	Football	Division I FCS Independent	WAC
VCU Rams	All sports (non-football)	CAA	Atlantic 10
Weber State Wildcats	Softball	PCSC	Big Sky
West Virginia Mountaineers	All sports except men's soccer, rifle, and women's gymnastics	Big East	Big 12
West Virginia Mountaineers	Men's soccer	Big East	MAC
West Virginia Mountaineers	Women's gymnastics	EAGL	Big 12
West Virginia Mountaineers	Women's rowing	Big East	Big 12 & C-USA
Winthrop Eagles	Women's lacrosse	No team	Big South

== 2011–2012 ==
School	Sport(s)	Former Conference	New Conference
Boise State Broncos	All sports except wrestling	WAC	Mountain West
BYU Cougars	All sports except football, softball, and men's volleyball	Mountain West	WCC
BYU Cougars	Football	Mountain West	Independent
BYU Cougars	Softball	Mountain West	WAC
Campbell Fighting Camels	All sports except football, men's wrestling, and women's swimming and diving	Atlantic Sun	Big South
Centenary Gentlemen	All sports (non-football)	The Summit	American Southwest (Division III)
Cleveland State Vikings	Baseball	Horizon	Dropped baseball
Colorado Buffaloes	All sports except skiing and indoor track & field	Big 12	Pac-12
Colorado Buffaloes	Indoor track & field	Big 12	MPSF
Eastern Illinois Panthers	Men's soccer	Missouri Valley	The Summit
Lamar Cardinals	Football	Division I FCS Independent	Southland
Le Moyne Dolphins	Baseball	Independent	Northeast-10 (Division II)
Lindenwood Lady Lions	Women's ice hockey	CCWHA (ACHA Division I, club hockey)	Division I Independent
Nebraska Cornhuskers	All sports	Big 12	Big Ten
Nebraska-Omaha Mavericks	Baseball	MIAA (Division II)	Independent
New Orleans Privateers	All sports (non-football)	Independent	Independent (Division II)
North Carolina Central Eagles	All sports except men's golf	Independent	MEAC
Old Dominion Monarchs	Football	Division I FCS Independent	CAA
Portland Pilots	Women's rowing	Club team	WCC
Savannah State Tigers	All sports except men's and women's golf	Independent	MEAC
SIU Edwardsville Cougars	All sports (non-football)	Independent	Ohio Valley
South Alabama Jaguars	Football	Unclassified (exhibition only)	Division I FCS Independent
South Dakota Coyotes	All sports except football	Great West	The Summit
Texas State Bobcats	Football	Southland	Division I FCS Independent
Utah Utes	All sports	Mountain West	Pac-12
Wayne State Warriors	Women's ice hockey	CHA	Dropped hockey

== 2010–2011 ==
School	Sport(s)	Former Conference	New Conference
Bemidji State Beavers	Men's ice hockey	CHA	WCHA
Duquesne Dukes	Baseball	Atlantic 10	Dropped baseball
Georgia State Panthers	Football	(non-football)	Division I FCS Independent
High Point Panthers	Women's lacrosse	Club team	National Lacrosse Conference
Hofstra Pride	Football	CAA	Dropped football
Lamar Cardinals	Football	(non-football)	Division I FCS Independent
Old Dominion Monarchs	Football	(non-football)	Division I FCS Independent
New Orleans Privateers	All sports (non-football)	Sun Belt	Independent
Niagara Purple Eagles	Men's ice hockey	CHA	Atlantic Hockey
Northeastern Huskies	Football	CAA	Dropped football
Robert Morris Colonials	Men's ice hockey	CHA	Atlantic Hockey
SIU Edwardsville Cougars	Men's soccer	Division I Independent	Missouri Valley Conference
UAH Chargers	Hockey	CHA	Division I Independent
UNO Mavericks	Hockey	CCHA	WCHA

== See also ==
- 1996 NCAA conference realignment
- 2005 NCAA conference realignment
- 2010–2014 NCAA conference realignment
- 2021–2024 NCAA conference realignment
