= 2023 NCAA Bowling Championship =

Collegiate bowling championship tournament

Tournament details
- Dates: April 14–15, 2023
- Teams: 17

Final positions
- Champions: Vanderbilt (3rd title)
- Runners-up: Arkansas State (3rd title match)

The 2023 NCAA Bowling Championship was the 19th edition of the NCAA Bowling Championship, the annual tournament to determine the national champion of women's NCAA collegiate ten-pin bowling. The finals were hosted by UNLV and played at the South Point Hotel in Enterprise, Nevada from April 14 to 15, 2023. The championship game was streamed live on ESPNU. Vanderbilt beat Arkansas State in the championship game to win their third title.

== Format ==
The 2023 championship featured a 17-team format, with 4 regionals. Each regional consisted of four teams, except for the Arlington regional which had five with a play-in match between Fayetteville State and Prairie View. Each regional had one winner who would go on to play in a four-team tournament for the national championship. The 2023 pre-determined regional locations were as follows:

- Arlington, Texas
- Lansing, Michigan
- Rochester, New York
- Pittsburgh, Pennsylvania

Each regional was played as a double-elimination tournament, except for the one play-in match. All regional matches, except for what the NCAA calls "if necessary regional finals", were best-of-three matches bowled in the following order: five-person team, Baker total pinfall, Baker best-of-seven match play. Any "if necessary regional final" was Baker best-of-seven. Regional winners advanced to the championship event, which was also double-elimination. All matches were bowled under the standard format for regionals (best-of-three matches using specified formats in a specific order) except the championship final, which was Baker best-of-seven.

== Qualification ==
Since there is only one national collegiate championship for women's bowling, all NCAA bowling programs (whether from Division I, Division II, or Division III) were eligible. A total of 17 teams competed in the double-elimination tournament, with nine conference champions receiving automatic bids and eight teams receiving at-large bids. The teams were revealed in a selection show on March 29, 2023.

=== Bids ===
There were 17 teams selected to the tournament - nine were selected automatically as conference champions, while another eight were selected at-large. The top four teams in the tournament were seeded and assigned to separate regions; they were the only teams seeded for this tournament.

The Southland Bowling League (SBL) had the most bids of any conference with six, while the Northeast Conference (NEC) and Great Lakes Valley Conference (GLVC) had two. The Allegheny Mountain Collegiate Conference (AMCC), Central Intercollegiate Athletic Association (CIAA), College Conference of Illinois and Wisconsin (CCIW), East Coast Conference (ECC), Mid-Eastern Athletic Conference (MEAC), and Southwestern Athletic Conference (SWAC) sent only their conference tournament champions. Additionally, one independent team received an at-large bid to the tournament.

Seed	Team	Conference	Bid type	Appearance	Last
1	McKendree	GLVC	Automatic	7th	2022
2	Vanderbilt	SBL	At-large	17th	2022
3	Arkansas State	SBL	Automatic	15th	2022
4	Nebraska	Independent	At-large	19th	2022
	Carthage	CCIW	Automatic	1st	Never
	Duquesne	NEC	At-large	2nd	2021
	Fayetteville State	CIAA	Automatic	2nd	2005
	Louisiana Tech	SBL	At-large	3rd	2022
	Maryville	GLVC	At-large	1st	Never
	Medaille	AMCC	Automatic	4th	2022
	Mercyhurst	ECC	Automatic	1st	Never
	North Carolina A&T	MEAC	Automatic	5th	2022
	Prairie View A&M	SWAC	Automatic	3rd	2021
	Sacred Heart	NEC	Automatic	9th	2022
	Sam Houston	SBL	At-large	11th	2022
	Stephen F. Austin	SBL	At-large	6th	2022
	Youngstown State	SBL	At-large	3rd	2022

== Tournament bracket ==
All regions were double-elimination, except for the finals, which was double-elimination before a single Baker best-of-7 championship match.

=== Arlington Regional ===
==== Play-in ====
Play-in match
Fayetteville State	1
Prairie View A&M	2

==== Bracket ====
First round Consolation first round
1	McKendree	2
Prairie View	0
Winner's bracket
Sam Houston	0
Louisiana Tech	2
Prairie View	0
Sam Houston	2
Loser's bracket

Second round Consolation second round
1	McKendree	2
Louisiana Tech	0
Sam Houston	2
Louisiana Tech	1

Regional final
1	McKendree	2	-
Sam Houston	0	-

=== Lansing Regional ===
First round Consolation first round
2	Vanderbilt	2
Carthage	0
Winner's bracket
Youngstown State	2
Maryville	0
Carthage	0
Maryville	2
Loser's bracket

Second round Consolation second round
2	Vanderbilt	2
Youngstown State	0
Maryville	1
Youngstown State	2

Regional final
2	Vanderbilt	0	4
Youngstown State	2	0

=== Rochester Regional ===
First round Consolation first round
3	Arkansas State	2
Sacred Heart	0
Winner's bracket
North Carolina A&T	2
Medaille	0
Sacred Heart	2
Medaille	0
Loser's bracket

Second round Consolation second round
3	Arkansas State	2
North Carolina A&T	1
Sacred Heart	0
North Carolina A&T	2

Regional final
3	Arkansas State	2	-
North Carolina A&T	0	-

=== Pittsburgh Regional ===
First round Consolation first round
4	Nebraska	2
Mercyhurst	0
Winner's bracket
Stephen F. Austin	0
Duquesne	2
Mercyhurst	1
Stephen F. Austin	2
Loser's bracket

Second round Consolation second round
4	Nebraska	2
Duquesne	0
Stephen F. Austin	2
Duquesne	1

Regional final
4	Nebraska	2	-
Stephen F. Austin	1	-

=== Finals ===
==== Las Vegas, Nevada ====
First round Consolation first round
1	McKendree	0
4	Nebraska	2
Winner's bracket
2	Vanderbilt	0
3	Arkansas State	2
1	McKendree	0
2	Vanderbilt	2
Loser's bracket

Second round Consolation second round
4	Nebraska	0
3	Arkansas State	2
2	Vanderbilt	2
4	Nebraska	0

Championship final
3	Arkansas State	3
2	Vanderbilt	4
