= 2022 NCAA Bowling Championship =

Collegiate bowling championship tournament

Tournament details
- Dates: April 15–16, 2022
- Teams: 16

Final positions
- Champions: McKendree (2nd title)
- Runners-up: Stephen F. Austin (4th title match)

The 2022 NCAA Bowling Championship was the 18th edition of the NCAA Bowling Championship, the annual tournament to determine the national champion of women's NCAA collegiate ten-pin bowling. The finals were hosted by the Mid-American Conference and played at Wayne Webb's Columbus Bowl in Columbus, Ohio from April 15–16, 2022.

McKendree would win their second national title after beating 2-time champion Stephen F. Austin 4–0 in the final with scores of 201–188, 200–188, 186–182, 215–189. This was only the second time in tournament history that a team swept all 4 games in the championship match, both times by McKendree.

== Format ==
The 2022 championship continued the 16-team format that debuted in the 2021 tournament. However, whereas the 2021 regionals were also contested at the championship site, the 2022 regionals took place at four pre-determined locations:

- Arlington, Texas
- Erie, Pennsylvania
- Lansing, Michigan
- Rochester, New York

Each regional was played as a double-elimination tournament. All regional matches, except for what the NCAA calls "if necessary regional finals", were best-of-three matches bowled in the following order: five-person team, Baker total pinfall, Baker best-of-seven match play. Any "if necessary regional final" was Baker best-of-seven. Regional winners advanced to the championship event, which was also double-elimination. All matches were bowled under the standard format for regionals (best-of-three matches using specified formats in a specific order) except the championship final, which was Baker best-of-seven.

== Qualification ==
Since there is only one national collegiate championship for women's bowling, all NCAA bowling programs (whether from Division I, Division II, or Division III) were eligible. A total of 16 teams competed in the double-elimination tournament, with eight conference champions receiving automatic bids and eight teams receiving at-large bids. The teams were revealed in a selection show on March 30, 2022.

=== Bids ===
There were 16 teams selected to the tournament - eight were selected automatically as conference champions, while another eight were selected at-large. The top four teams in the tournament were seeded and assigned to separate regions; they were the only teams seeded for this tournament

The Southland Bowling League (SBL) had the most bids of any conference with six, while the Northeast Conference (NEC) had three. The Allegheny Mountain Collegiate Conference (AMCC), Central Intercollegiate Athletic Association (CIAA), East Coast Conference (ECC), Great Lakes Valley Conference (GLVC), Mid-Eastern Athletic Conference (MEAC), Southwestern Athletic Conference (SWAC) sent only their conference tournament champions. Additionally, one independent team received an at-large bid to the tournament.

Seed	Team	Conference	Bid type	Appearance	Last
1	McKendree	GLVC	Automatic	6th	2021
2	Nebraska	Independent	At-large	18th	2021
3	Vanderbilt	SBL	Automatic	16th	2021
4	Sam Houston State	SBL	At-large	10th	2021
	Alabama State	SWAC	Automatic	1st	Never
	Arkansas State	SBL	At-large	14th	2021
	Bowie State	CIAA	Automatic	3rd	2019
	Fairleigh Dickinson	NEC	At-large	14th	2021
	Louisiana Tech	SBL	At-large	2nd	2021
	Medaille	AMCC	Automatic	3rd	2021
	Mount St. Mary's	NEC	At-large	2nd	2021
	North Carolina A&T	MEAC	Automatic	4th	2021
	Sacred Heart	NEC	Automatic	8th	2021
	Stephen F. Austin	SBL	At-large	5th	2019
	Wilmington (DE)	ECC	Automatic	1st	Never
	Youngstown State	SBL	At-large	2nd	2021

== Tournament bracket ==
All regions were double-elimination, except for the finals, which was double-elimination before a single Baker best-of-7 championship match.

=== Erie Regional ===
First round Consolation first round
1	McKendree	2
Bowie State	0
Winner's bracket
Mount St. Mary's	2
Medaille	1
Bowie State	0
Medaille	2
Loser's bracket

Second round Consolation second round
1	McKendree	2
Mount St. Mary's	0
Mount St. Mary's	2
Medaille	1

Regional final
1	McKendree	0	4
Mount St. Mary's	2	2

=== Arlington Regional ===
First round Consolation first round
4	Sam Houston State	0
Stephen F. Austin	2
Winner's bracket
Louisiana Tech	1
North Carolina A&T	2
4	Sam Houston State	0
Louisiana Tech	2
Loser's bracket

Second round Consolation second round
Stephen F. Austin	2
North Carolina A&T	0
North Carolina A&T	0
Louisiana Tech	2

Regional final
Stephen F. Austin	2	-
Louisiana Tech	0	-

=== Rochester Regional ===
First round Consolation first round
2	Nebraska	0
Wilmington (DE)	2
Winner's bracket
Fairleigh Dickinson	2
Sacred Heart	0
2	Nebraska	2
Sacred Heart	0
Loser's bracket

Second round Consolation second round
Wilmington (DE)	0
Fairleigh Dickinson	2
Wilmington (DE)	0
2	Nebraska	2

Regional final
Fairleigh Dickinson	2	-
2	Nebraska	0	-

=== Lansing Regional ===
First round Consolation first round
3	Vanderbilt	2
Alabama State	0
Winner's bracket
Arkansas State	2
Youngstown State	1
Alabama State	0
Youngstown State	2
Loser's bracket

Second round Consolation second round
3	Vanderbilt	2
Arkansas State	1
Arkansas State	2
Youngstown State	1

Regional final
3	Vanderbilt	2	-
Arkansas State	0	-

=== Finals ===
First round Consolation first round
1	McKendree	1
Stephen F. Austin	2
Winner's bracket
Fairleigh Dickinson	1
3	Vanderbilt	2
1	McKendree	2
Fairleigh Dickinson	0
Loser's bracket

Second round Consolation second round
Stephen F. Austin	2
3	Vanderbilt	1
3	Vanderbilt	1
1	McKendree	2

Championship final
Stephen F. Austin	0
1	McKendree	4
