= NCAA independents =

NCAA Independents may refer to:

- NCAA Division I FBS independent schools
- NCAA Division I FCS independent schools
- NCAA Division I independent schools — in general
- NCAA Division I independent schools (ice hockey)
- NCAA Division II independent schools
- NCAA Division III independent schools
- NCAA independent schools (lacrosse) – all divisions
