= Jacksonville Dolphins =

Jackson University sports teams

- University: Jacksonville University
- Nickname: Dolphins
- NCAA: Division I
- Conference: ASUN Conference (primary); MAAC (rowing)
- Athletic director: Alex Ricker-Gilbert
- Location: Jacksonville, Florida
- Varsity teams: 18 (7 men's, 10 women's, 1 co-ed)
- Basketball arena: Swisher Gymnasium
- Baseball stadium: John Sessions Stadium
- Softball stadium: Debbie and Fred Pruitt Softball Complex
- Soccer stadium: Southern Oak Stadium
- Other venues: VyStar Veterans Memorial Arena
- Colors: Green and white
- Mascot: Dunk'n the Dolphin
- Website: judolphins.com

The Jacksonville Dolphins are the intercollegiate athletics teams that represent Jacksonville University, located in Jacksonville, Florida. The Dolphins participate in NCAA Division I athletics, and are primarily members of the ASUN Conference. Some teams in sports that are not sponsored by the ASUN play in other conferences; specifically, the men's and women's rowing teams are in the Metro Atlantic Athletic Conference. The men's lacrosse team had played in the Southern Conference (SoCon) from 2015 to 2022, but that sport will return to the ASUN for the 2023 season (2022–23 school year).

== Conference affiliations ==
NJCAA

- NJCAA Independent (1948–1957)

NAIA

- NAIA Independent (1957–1966)

NCAA

- NCAA Division I Independent (1966–1976)
- Sun Belt Conference (1976–1998)
- Atlantic Sun Conference (1998–present) (Note: Formerly known as the Trans Atlantic Athletic Conference (TAAC) until 2001, later known as the Atlantic Sun Conference until 2016, and then known as the ASUN Conference until 2023)

== Varsity teams ==
Men's sports	Women's sports
Baseball	Basketball
Basketball	Beach volleyball
Cross country	Cross country
Golf	Golf
Lacrosse	Lacrosse
Rowing	Rowing
Soccer	Soccer
Hockey	Softball
	Track and field^{†}
	Volleyball
† – Track and field includes both indoor and outdoor

=== Baseball ===
The baseball team began play in 1957. It competed in the small-school College Division until 1969, its first season in the University Division (which later became NCAA Division I). Its first conference membership was in the Sun Belt Conference, where it first played in 1978. The Dolphins were affiliated with that conference until 1998, when they joined the Trans America Athletic Conference (later renamed the Atlantic Sun).

The Dolphins have participated in 15 NCAA tournaments, the first being in 1968, when they were in the College Division Tournament. The other 14 have come in Division I. Jacksonville's best showing in the NCAA tournament came in the 1976 South Regional, when they were one game away from the College World Series, but were eliminated by Auburn 7–5. The Dolphins also were part of the NCAA tournament in 1972, 1989, 1991, 1994, 1995, 1999, 2001, 2003, 2006, 2007, 2009, 2011, and 2018.

=== Men's basketball ===
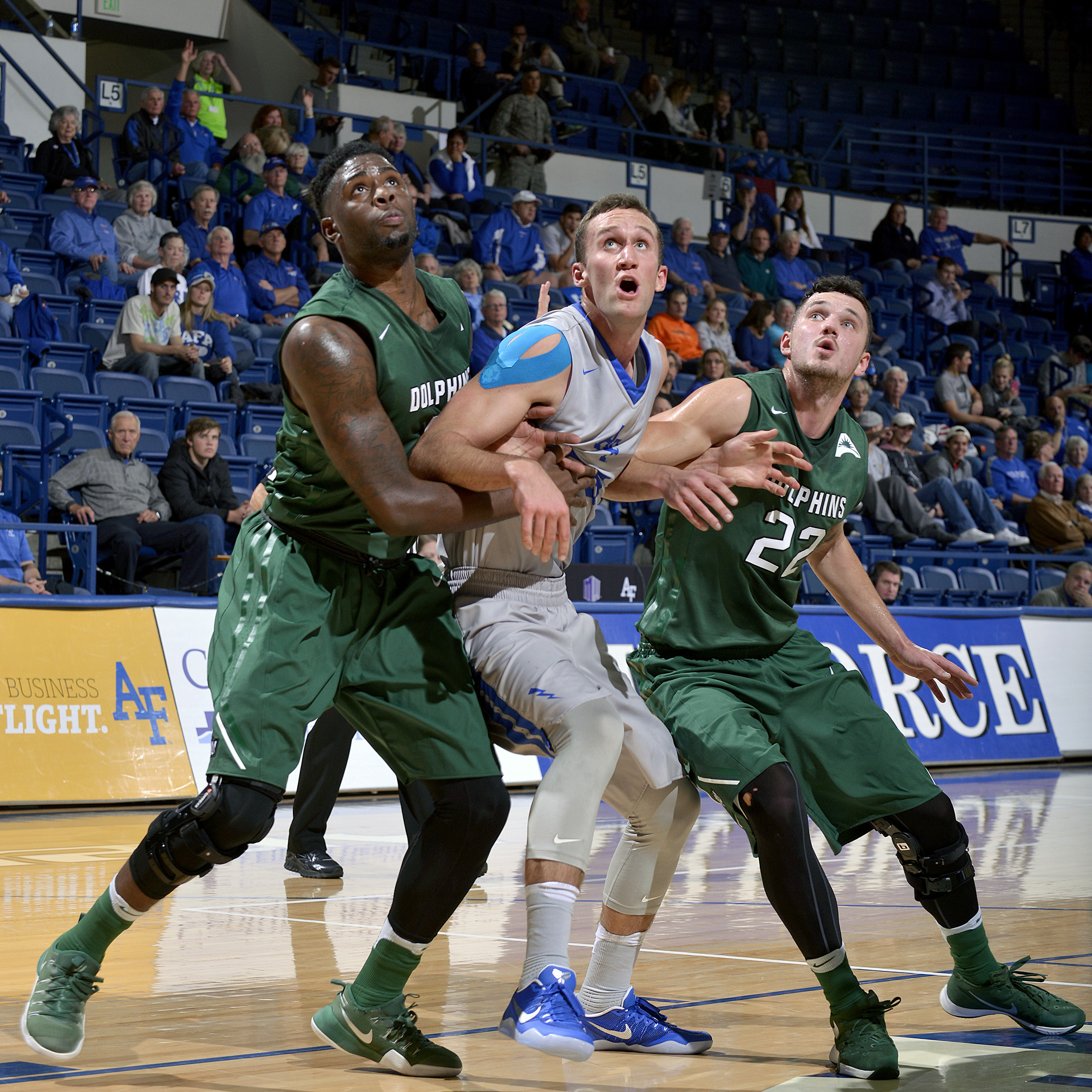
A game between the Jacksonville Dolphins and Air Force Falcons men's basketball teams in 2016

The men's basketball program was established in 1949. Jacksonville has appeared in five NCAA Division I men's basketball tournaments, most recently in 1986. Their most successful tournament was the first they participated in, the 1970 NCAA tournament.

The Dolphins, led by NBA Hall-of-Famer Artis Gilmore, the school's all-time leader in rebounds, blocks and field goals, and Rex Morgan, the career assists leader, advanced to the title game before losing to UCLA 80–69. During that 1969–70 season, the team became the first NCAA basketball program to average 100 points per game in a season.

The Dolphins have won one A-Sun regular-season title (2008–09), but have not yet won the conference tournament and the accompanying automatic bid to the NCAA tournament as an A-Sun member.

=== Soccer ===
The team is a member of the ASUN Conference, which is part of the National Collegiate Athletic Association's Division I. Jacksonville's first men's soccer team was fielded in 1957. The team plays its home games at Southern Oak Stadium. The Dolphins are coached by Mauricio Ruiz.

The Dolphins have been in several NCAA conferences over their 60-year history. In 1959, the Dolphins won the Florida Intercollegiate Conference. The Dolphins have won three Sun Belt Conference Men's Soccer tournaments, with one coming 1987 and the other two coming from 1995–1996. In 2008, the Dolphins won the Atlantic Sun Men's Soccer tournament. The Dolphins best performance in NCAA Division I Men's Soccer Championship came in 1998, where they reached the round of 16.

=== Football ===
The football team competed in the Pioneer Football League, a Division I football-only conference. Their first season of play was in 1998, and they had been members of the Pioneer Football League during 2001 and 2019.

They played their home games at D. B. Milne Field, which has a listed capacity of 5000 spectators.

The Dolphins won the PFL conference title in 2008 and 2010, and represented the PFL in the 2008 Gridiron Classic, losing to Albany.

On December 3, 2019, the university announced it was discontinuing its football program.

==== Bowl games ====
Season	Bowl	Champion		Runner-up	
2008	Gridiron Classic	Albany	28	Jacksonville	0

=== Lacrosse ===
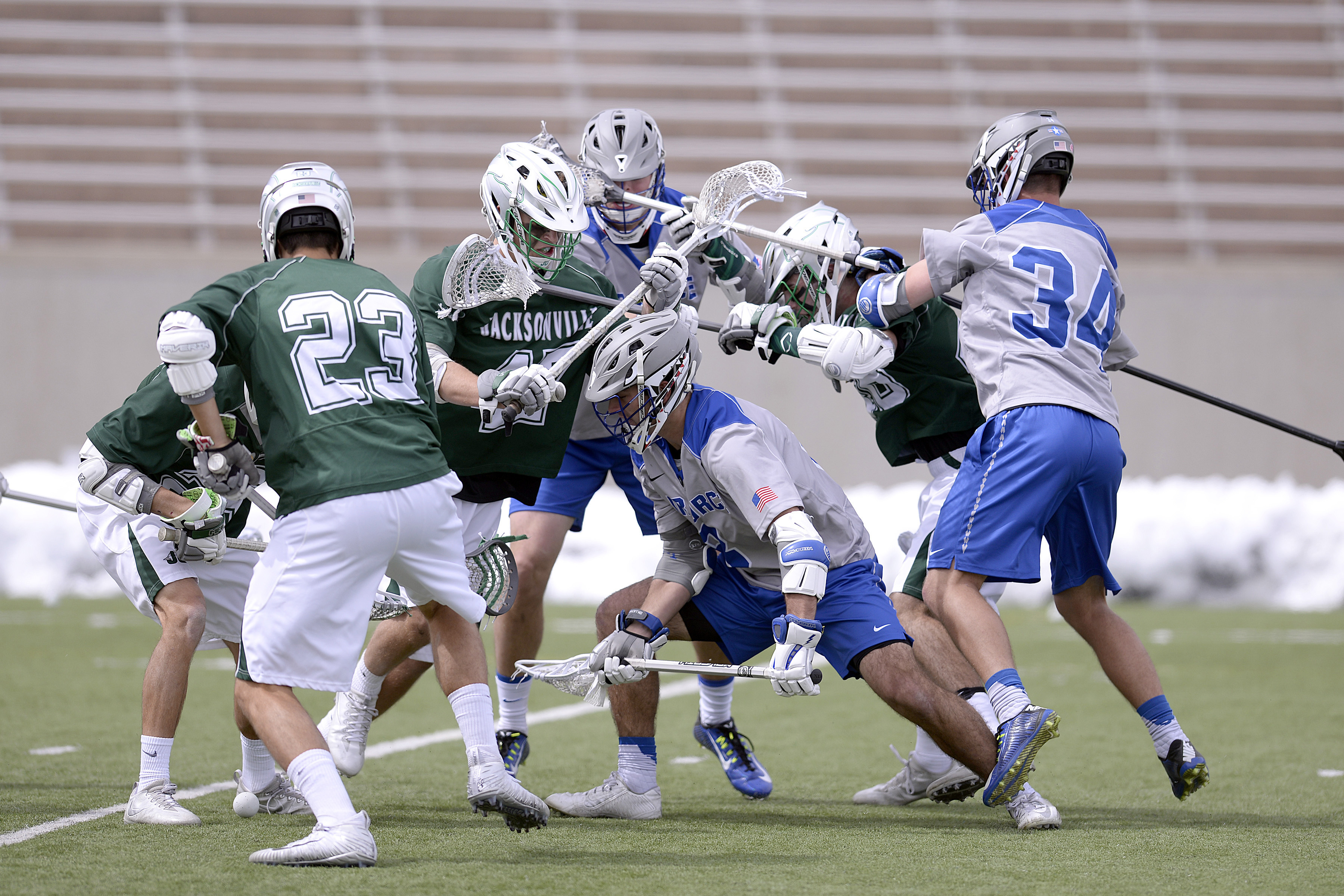
Jacksonville v Air Force game in 2023

Jacksonville fielded both men's and women's NCAA Division I lacrosse teams starting with the 2010 season; both programs became the first in Florida to compete in an NCAA game on February 6, 2010.

The women's team was a founding member of the National Lacrosse Conference. In addition to Jacksonville, the eight-team conference includes southern-based universities Davidson, High Point, Presbyterian, Liberty, and Longwood, as well as northern programs Detroit Mercy and Howard. The conference was a provisional conference for two years by NCAA standards; it must exist for two years to earn a potential automatic qualifier into the NCAA tournament. The NLC disbanded after the 2012 season after the two all-sports conferences that contained most of that league's members, the ASUN and Big South, began sponsoring women's lacrosse.

The men's team, the only men's Division I lacrosse team in Florida, will play in the school's full-time home of ASUN Conference as of the next NCAA lacrosse season in 2023. This followed an eight-season run in the Southern Conference. John Galloway was named head coach in June 2016 after a four-year stint at Providence College. From Syracuse, New York, Galloway played goalkeeper for Syracuse University and ended his college career with an NCAA-record 59 wins while playing a record 3,776 minutes. He later played professionally and for the United States men's national lacrosse team in 2014. Casey Powell, also a decorated professional lacrosse player, came on board as Jacksonville's first assistant in June 2016.

== Sailing ==
The sailing team competes in the South Atlantic Intercollegiate Sailing Association of the Inter-Collegiate Sailing Association and has won two national championships, the 2020–21 and 2021-22 Women's Singlehanded National Championship.

== Traditions and rivalries ==
Jacksonville University's most notable rivalry is with crosstown opponents and fellow ASUN members, the University of North Florida Ospreys. The two universities contest the "River City Rumble", in which the school with the most wins over the other across all sports receives a trophy, the SunTrust Old Wooden Barrel. JU holds the edge in the men's basketball series 15–11 in favor of JU after the 2014–15 regular season. However, UNF leads the series 10–7 since UNF became a full Division I member.

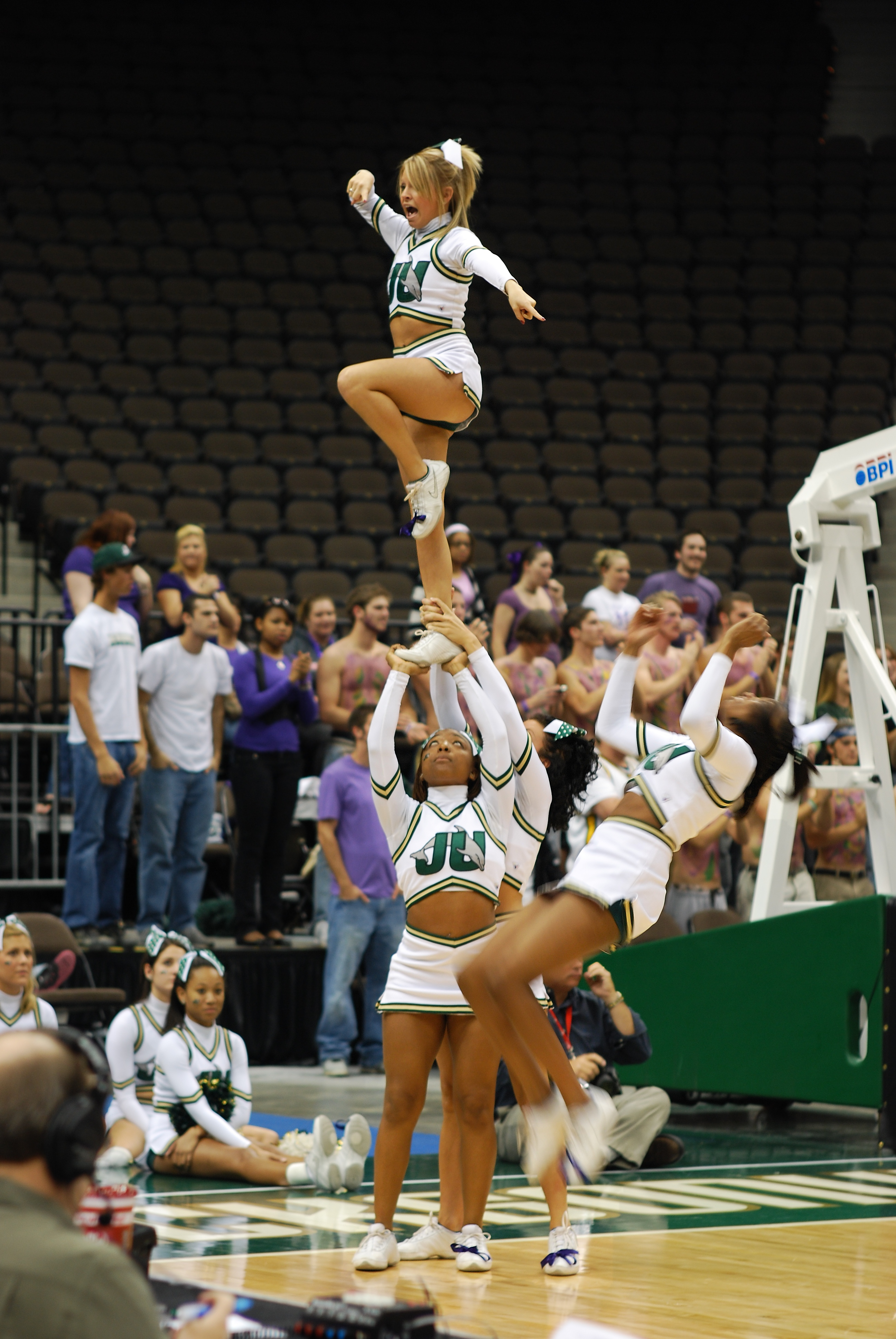
Flying JU Cheerleaders

Year	Winner
2005–06	JU, 11–9
2006–07	UNF, 11–9
2007–08	Tied 10–10
2008–09	JU, 13–7
2009–10	JU, 11–9
2010–11	JU, 11–9
2011–12	UNF, 13–7
2012–13	UNF, 14.5–7.5
2013–14	Tied 11–11
2014–15	UNF, 14–8
2015–16	JU, 12–10
Years with barrel: UNF 7, JU 5
