= National Lacrosse Conference =

- Association: NCAA
- Founded: 2008
- Folded: 2012
- Sports fielded: College lacrosse; men's: 0; women's: 1
- Division: Division I
- No. of teams: 8
- Headquarters: Detroit, Michigan
- Region: Southeastern United States, Michigan
- Website: nlclacrosse.com

The National Lacrosse Conference (NLC) was an NCAA Division I women's lacrosse-only college athletic conference whose members were located primarily in the Southeastern United States, with one team, Detroit (now athletically branded as Detroit Mercy), located in Michigan. The league formed in 2008 in advance of the 2009 NCAA lacrosse season, and played its first season with four member teams. Three more schools joined for the 2010 season with an additional school joining in 2011. The NLC had 8 member schools by the end of its existence. The NLC did not have an automatic bid to the NCAA Tournament; conference members could qualify through an at-large bid.

The conference disbanded in 2012 after the Atlantic Sun Conference (ASUN) and Big South Conference began sponsoring women's lacrosse. In the ASUN, Jacksonville had been the only full member to sponsor women's lacrosse, but Kennesaw State and Stetson added the sport in 2012–13. Those schools brought Detroit and Howard into ASUN lacrosse. As for the Big South, three full members—High Point, Liberty, and Presbyterian—sponsored the sport during the NLC's final season in 2012. The number of full Big South members sponsoring the sport increased to seven for the 2012–13 school year when NLC member Longwood, previously a basketball independent, joined the Big South and Campbell, Coastal Carolina, and Winthrop added the sport. Davidson followed these schools into Big South lacrosse.

== Final members ==
Institution	City	Nickname	Founded	Affiliation	Enrollment	Tenure (Note: Years listed are lacrosse seasons. Since NCAA lacrosse is a spring sport, the year of joining is the calendar year before the first season.)	Current women's lacrosse conference
Davidson College	Davidson, North Carolina	Wildcats	1837	Private/Presbyterian	1,700	2009–2012	Atlantic 10 Conference
University of Detroit Mercy	Detroit, Michigan	Titans	1877	Private/Catholic	6,000	2009–2012	Mid-American Conference
Howard University	Washington, D.C.	Lady Bison	1867	Private	9,000	2009–2012	Northeast Conference
Jacksonville University	Jacksonville, Florida	Dolphins	1934	Private	3,100	2010–2012	ASUN Conference
Liberty University	Lynchburg, Virginia	Lady Flames	1971	Private/Baptist	19,900	2010–2012	ASUN Conference
Longwood University	Farmville, Virginia	Lancers	1839	Public	4,479	2009–2012	Big South Conference
Presbyterian College	Clinton, South Carolina	Blue Hose	1880	Private/Presbyterian	1,300	2010–2012	Big South Conference
High Point University	High Point, North Carolina	Panthers	1924	Private/Methodist	3,079	2011–2012	Big South Conference

== Conference champions ==
- 2009 – Longwood
- 2010 – Longwood
- 2011 – High Point
