= Craig Keilitz =

Craig Keilitz is the Executive Director of the American Baseball Coaches Association. Keilitz was named to his current position on Feb. 17, 2014 and took over as Executive Director on July 1, 2014.

Keilitz previously served as vice president for athletics and athletic director (AD) at High Point University. He was named AD on January 9, 2008 and named Vice President for Athletics on August 21, 2013. He previously worked at Wake Forest University for 13 years and the University of Michigan as the NCAA compliance director.

Since Keilitz has been athletic director, the High Point Panthers added men's and women's lacrosse and completed several athletic facility renovations, including a $2 million upgrade of HPU's Millis Center and installation of Mondo 3NX turf in Vert Stadium. High Point University has broken ground on a new Athletic Performance Center that is set to open in 2014. Planning has been announced for a new basketball arena.

Keilitz was named Executive Director of the American Baseball Coaches Association on Feb. 17, 2014, and will assume that position on July 1, 2014.

Keilitz's father, Dave Keilitz, is former baseball coach and athletic director at Central Michigan University. Dave became Executive Director of the ABCA in 1994 and announced his retirement in 2013, the position Craig Keilitz took in 2014.
