= Northern Pacific Field Hockey Conference =

The Northern Pacific Field Hockey Conference (NorPac) was an NCAA Division I conference that only sponsored women's field hockey. Founded in 1982, it began as a California-based conference, but expanded over time to include schools across the United States.

Over time, most of the NorPac's eastern schools left the conference for various reasons. The conference played its last season in 2014 and formally disbanded at the end of the 2014–15 school year. The four founding members, all from California, became single-sport members of the America East Conference. The two remaining eastern schools, Appalachian State and Liberty, became Division I field hockey independents. Both would join conferences in the coming years; Liberty became a single-sport member of the Big East Conference in 2016, and Appalachian State became a single-sport member of the Mid-American Conference in 2017.

== Final members ==
- Appalachian State Mountaineers
- Liberty Lady Flames
- California Golden Bears
- Pacific Tigers
- Stanford Cardinal
- UC Davis Aggies

== Other former members ==
- Davidson Wildcats – left in 2014 when the school joined the field hockey-sponsoring Atlantic 10 Conference (A10)
- Davis & Elkins Senators – dropped program
- Longwood Lancers – now an associate member of the Mid-American Conference (MAC)
- Missouri State Lady Bears – dropped program after the 2017 season
- Radford Highlanders – dropped program after the 2013 season
- Saint Louis Billikens – left in 2005 when the school joined the A10
