= American Baseball Coaches Association =

American sport organization

- Nickname: ABCA
- Formation: 1945
- Headquarters: Greensboro, North Carolina
- Members: 15,500 (Sept. 1 - Aug. 31)
- Executive Director: Craig Keilitz
- Website: abca.org

The American Baseball Coaches Association (ABCA) is the world’s largest amateur baseball coaching organization and a leading professional association for baseball coaches across all levels of the sport. Founded in 1945, the ABCA represents over 15,000 members from all 50 U.S. states and more than 40 countries worldwide, encompassing coaches from youth, high school, junior college, NAIA, and NCAA divisions.

The ABCA advances the profession of coaching through education, advocacy, resources, and community building. It organizes the annual ABCA Convention, which is recognized as the world’s largest baseball convention, and supports year-round coaching education through clinics, publications, webinars and digital resources.

== History ==
The organization was founded on June 29, 1945 when 27 college baseball coaches gathered in New York City to promote and improve college baseball. Originally named the American Association of College Baseball Coaches, early meetings focused on national statistics, promotion of the game, and cooperation with professional baseball.

Since then, the ABCA has grown substantially, serving coaches at every amateur level and expanding its programs and services to support coaching education internationally.

Read more about the association's inception and history.

== Membership ==
The ABCA membership provides baseball coaches with year-round educational resources, professional tools, networking opportunities, publications, and practical support designed to enhance coaching effectiveness at all levels of the game. The membership year runs from September 1 through August 31 annually.

Membership Benefits:

ABCA Video Library: One of the most valued benefits of membership is access to the ABCA Video Library, which contains more than 1,000 on-demand coaching clinic videos. These videos include full presentations from annual ABCA Conventions dating back to 2008, sessions from regional Barnstormers Clinics, webinars, and other educational events. Coaches can filter and search by topic, speaker, or event, enabling focused study on specific techniques, strategies, or areas of interest. This digital archive functions as a virtual coaching mentor, allowing members to learn from leading practitioners whenever needed.

Inside Pitch Magazine: Members receive Inside Pitch, the official ABCA magazine, six times per year. The publication offers in-depth features on coaching philosophies, trends, practice planning, player development, and interviews with respected coaches and experts. A full digital archive of past issues is also available to members.

Annual ABCA Convention: Members may attend the world’s largest baseball coaching convention each January. Convention programming includes more than 50 educational clinics, panel discussions, youth sessions, and the ABCA Trade Show, where hundreds of vendors showcase products, equipment, and training tools. Clinic sessions are also live streamed and later added to the Video Library.

Barnstormers Regional Clinics: The ABCA organizes multiple one-day regional coaching clinics throughout the fall. These events offer on-field demonstrations, group sessions, and peer interaction, and are free for members to attend.

Insurance Coverage: U.S. resident members receive a $1 million personal liability insurance policy at no extra cost, covering coaching duties at practices and games. This benefit provides peace of mind for coaches against liability claims arising from their professional responsibilities.

ABCA Press Box Newsletter: Delivered weekly, the Press Box e-newsletter keeps members updated with news, coaching tips, tactical articles, job listings, open date opportunities, and association announcements.

Discount and Member Pricing Programs: Members enjoy exclusive discounts on baseball equipment, training tools, technology, team gear, rental cars, and hotel reservations through numerous partner programs. These savings support both personal and team-level budgeting needs.

Job Board and Open Dates Listings: The ABCA Job Postings and Open Schedule Dates listings are free for members to post and use, helping coaches find employment opportunities or fill scheduling gaps. These pages receive high visibility and are widely used by athletic departments at all levels.

ABCA Podcast: The ABCA Podcast features discussions with successful coaches and experts on topics such as mechanics, practice design, leadership, recruiting, and the mental game, offering continuous learning in audio format.

Surveys and Advocacy: Members have the opportunity to participate in surveys and legislative consultations affecting baseball rules and governance at multiple levels, enabling coaches to have a voice in shaping the sport’s future.

Awards and Recognition Programs: The ABCA organizes a broad awards program, including Coaches of the Year, All-Region and All-American teams, and Player of the Year honors, celebrating excellence and achievement across divisions.

== ABCA Convention ==
The ABCA Convention is held each January and is recognized as the largest baseball coaching convention in the world. It spans four days and draws thousands of coaches for educational clinics, keynote sessions, panel discussions, networking opportunities, and the ABCA Trade Show, which features hundreds of companies showcasing the latest baseball products and innovations.

Clinic topics cover all facets of the game, from pitching and hitting to strength and conditioning, team building, and player development. The convention also includes youth coaches sessions and Expo Theater presentations.

The Convention content is also live-streamed and later made available on demand to members through the ABCA Video Library.

Upcoming ABCA Convention Sites & Dates:

- January 7-10, 2027: Chicago, Illinois
- January 6-9, 2028: Nashville, Tennessee
- January 4-7, 2029: National Harbor, Maryland
- January 3-6, 2030: Austin, Texas

== Educational Coaching Resources ==
The ABCA supports its mission through a variety of resources, including:

- ABCA Video Library: A repository of over 1,000 coaching clinic videos.
- Inside Pitch Magazine: Bi-monthly publication with coaching features, strategy, and news.
- ABCA Press Box: Weekly e-newsletter with news, tactical insights, and updates for members.
- ABCA Podcast: Weekly audio content covering a broad range of coaching topics.
- Mobile App: The “My ABCA” app provides on-the-go access to benefits and community engagement tools.

== Awards & Recognitions ==
The American Baseball Coaches Association's robust awards program honors hundreds of coaches and thousands of athletes on an annual basis. The ABCA Hall of Fame, which is the association's highest honor, was founded in 1966. The ABCA/Rawlings All-America Teams are the oldest All-America teams in college baseball, founded in 1949, and they are the only All-Americans selected by coaches.

=== ABCA Hall of Fame ===
The ABCA Hall of Fame was established in 1966 and remains the association’s highest honor, recognizing coaches who have demonstrated excellence, leadership, and significant contributions to the sport. More than 350 coaches have been inducted since the inaugural class.

Eligibility criteria include a minimum of 15 years of head coaching experience, ABCA membership, contributions to the ABCA and to the advancement of baseball, and exemplary character. Inductees are honored annually at the ABCA Convention Hall of Fame Banquet.

=== ABCA/ATEC Coaches of the Year ===
The ABCA/ATEC National & Regional Coaches of the Year are selected by member coaches in 11 divisions and recognized annually at the ABCA Convention.

=== ABCA/Soldier Sports National Assistant Coaches of the Year ===
The ABCA/Soldier Sports Assistant Coach of the Year Award, selected in 11 divisions, recognizes coaching expertise, recruiting, loyalty to the program and respect for the players and the game, among other criteria. The Assistant Coaches of the Year are recognized annually at the ABCA Convention.

=== Lefty Gomez Award ===
The ABCA/Wilson Lefty Gomez Award has been presented since 1962. The ABCA/Wilson Lefty Gomez Award goes to an individual who has distinguished himself amongst his peers and has contributed significantly to the game of baseball locally, nationally and internationally.

=== ABCA Dave Keilitz Ethics in Coaching Award ===
The Dave Keilitz Ethics in Coaching Award honors individuals who embody the ABCA Code of Ethics. The ABCA strives for sportsmanship, ethics, and integrity to the highest degree.

=== ABCA/Rawlings All-America Teams ===
The ABCA/Rawlings All-America Teams are the oldest All-America teams in college baseball, founded in 1949, and are the only teams selected by coaches. They are selected in nine divisions, from NCAA to high school.

=== ABCA/Rawlings Position Players & Pitchers of the Year ===
ABCA/Rawlings Pitchers and Position Players of the Year are selected in nine divisions (NCAA Div. I, II & III, NAIA, NJCAA Div. I, II & III, Pacific Association and High School) and chosen from the All-America First Teams.

=== ABCA/Rawlings All-Region Teams ===
The ABCA/Rawlings All-Region Teams honor more than 1,000 student-athletes on an annual basis. All-Region Teams are selected in five divisions (NCAA Div. I, II & III, Pacific Association, High School).

=== ABCA/Rawlings Gold Glove Awards ===
The ABCA/Rawlings Gold Glove Teams are selected in nine divisions, with all honorees receiving a Rawlings Gold Glove similar to those awarded to Major League players. This award was founded in 2007.

=== ABCA Defensive All-Region Teams ===
The ABCA Region All-Defensive Teams are selected by the All-America committees for NCAA Div. II & III, as well as the Pacific Association. The first ever Region All-Defensive teams were selected in 2023.

=== ABCA Team Academic Excellence Award ===
The ABCA Team Academic Excellence Award, presented by SportsAttack, honors high school and college programs that posted a GPA over 3.0 on a 4.0 scale. Nearly 800 programs are recognized annually.

=== ABCA Century Club ===
The ABCA Century Club recognizes member coaches for every 100 victories they accumulate, awarding each with a certificate and recognition in ABCA publications.

=== ABCA Lifetime Membership ===
ABCA Lifetime Membership is awarded to coaches who have been members of the organization for 35 consecutive years and support to amateur baseball across the world. The newest Lifetime Members are honored each year at the annual ABCA Convention.

=== Travel & Youth Baseball Service Awards ===
The ABCA Travel Baseball and Youth Baseball Service Awards were introduced in 2023 to honor coaches making significant contributions to youth in their community through the sport of baseball.
