= NCAA independent schools (lacrosse) =

NCAA independent lacrosse schools are four-year institutions in the United States that do not belong to a lacrosse-only conference or a primary all-sports conference that sponsors lacrosse. As of the 2026–27 academic year there are two men's and four women's lacrosse programs in Division I, Division II, and Division III that compete as independents.

== Division I ==
=== Men's ===
No programs will compete as independents in the 2027 season.

=== Women's ===
No programs will compete as independents in the 2027 season.

== Division II ==
=== Men's ===
Institution	Location	Nickname	Affiliation	Enrollment
Virginia State University	Petersburg, Virginia	Trojans	Public	4,592

== Division III ==
=== Men's ===
Institution	Location	Nickname	Affiliation	Enrollment
Whittier College	Whittier, California	Poets	Private	2,259

=== Women's ===
Institution	Location	Nickname	Affiliation	Enrollment
Colorado College	Colorado Springs, Colorado	Tigers	Private	2,011
University of Dallas	Irving, Texas	Crusaders	Catholic (Diocesan)	2,576
University of Northwestern – St. Paul	Saint Paul, Minnesota	Eagles	Nondenominational Christian	2,005
SUNY Canton	Canton, New York	Roos	Public	3,700

== See also ==
- College lacrosse
- NCAA independents
