= 2021 NCAA Bowling Championship =

Collegiate bowling championship tournament

Tournament details
- Dates: April 7–10, 2021
- Teams: 16

Final positions
- Champions: Nebraska (6th title)
- Runners-up: Arkansas State (2nd title match)

The 2021 NCAA Bowling Championship was the 17th edition of the NCAA Bowling Championship, the annual tournament to determine the national champion of women's NCAA collegiate ten-pin bowling. The tournament was hosted by the University of Central Missouri and played at the AMF Pro Bowl Lanes in North Kansas City, Missouri from April 7–10, 2021.

== Qualification ==
Since there is only one national collegiate championship for women's bowling, all NCAA bowling programs (whether from Division I, Division II, or Division III) were eligible. A total of 16 teams competed in the double elimination tournament, with six conference champions receiving automatic bids and ten teams receiving at-large bids. The teams were revealed in a selection show on March 31, 2021.

=== Bids ===
Sixteen teams contested the tournament. The Southland Bowling League (SBL) had the most bids of any conference with five, while the Northeast Conference (NEC) had four and the Mid-Eastern Athletic Conference (MEAC) had two. The Allegheny Mountain Collegiate Conference (AMCC), Southwestern Athletic Conference (SWAC), East Coast Conference (ECC), and Great Lakes Valley Conference (GLVC) sent only their conference tournament champion; the first three by an automatic bid and the last by an at-large bid. Additionally, one independent team received an at-large bid to the tournament.

Due in part to the tournament's expansion to sixteen teams, seven programs made their NCAA Tournament debut; three automatic qualifiers and four at-large bids.

Seed	Team	Conference	Bid type	Appearance	Last (Note: Since the 2020 championship tournament was cancelled because of the COVID-19 pandemic, the last tournament to be held was in 2019.)	Ref
1	McKendree Bearcats	GLVC	At-large (Note: McKendree won the GLVC tournament championship, but the conference does not have an automatic bid to the tournament for their champion.)	5th	2019	
2	Nebraska Cornhuskers	Independent	At-large	17th	2019	
3	North Carolina A&T Aggies	MEAC	Automatic	3rd	2018	
4	Louisiana Tech Lady Techsters	SBL	At-large	1st	—	
5	Fairleigh Dickinson Knights	NEC	Automatic	13th	2017	
6	Arkansas State Red Wolves	SBL	At-large	13th	2019	
7	Vanderbilt Commodores	SBL	Automatic	15th	2019	
8	Duquesne Dukes	NEC	At-large	1st	—	
9	Sacred Heart Pioneers	NEC	At-large	7th	2019	
10	Mount St. Mary's Mountaineers	NEC	At-large	1st	—	
11	Delaware State Hornets	MEAC	At-large	3rd	2010	
12	Sam Houston State Bearkats	SBL	At-large	9th	2019	
13	Youngstown State Penguins	SBL	At-large	1st	—	
14	Prairie View A&M Panthers	SWAC	Automatic	1st	—	
15	Medaille Mavericks	AMCC	Automatic	1st	—	
16	Roberts Wesleyan Redhawks	ECC	Automatic	1st	—	

== Schedule ==
All times Central (UTC-05:00).

Round	Date	Time
Regional stage
First round	April 7	9:00 a.m.
Second round	April 7	3:00 p.m.
Consolation first round	April 7	3:00 p.m.
Consolation second round	April 8	9:00 a.m.
Regional final	April 8	3:00 p.m.
Finals first round	April 9	9:00 a.m.
Finals consolation first round	April 9	3:00 p.m.
Finals second round	April 9	3:00 p.m.
Finals consolation second round	April 10	9:00 a.m.
National championship Broadcast on ESPNU	April 10	6:00 p.m.

== Tournament bracket ==
=== Region 1 ===
First round Consolation first round
1	McKendree	2
16	Roberts Wesleyan	0
8	Duquesne	0
9	Sacred Heart	2
Lower round 1
16	Roberts Wesleyan	0
8	Duquesne	2

Second round Consolation second round
1	McKendree	2
9	Sacred Heart	1
Lower final
9	Sacred Heart	2
8	Duquesne	1

Regional final
1	McKendree
9	Sacred Heart

=== Region 2 ===
First round Consolation first round
2	Nebraska	1
15	Medaille	2
7	Vanderbilt	2
10	Mount St. Mary's	0
Lower round 1
2	Nebraska	2
10	Mount St. Mary's	1

Second round Consolation second round
15	Medaille	0
7	Vanderbilt	2
Lower final
15	Medaille	0
2	Nebraska	2

Regional final
7	Vanderbilt
2	Nebraska

=== Region 3 ===
First round Consolation first round
3	North Carolina A&T	2
14	Prairie View A&M	1
6	Arkansas State	2
11	Delaware State	0
Lower round 1
14	Prairie View A&M	0
11	Delaware State	2

Second round Consolation second round
3	North Carolina A&T	1
6	Arkansas State	2
Lower final
3	North Carolina A&T	2
11	Delaware State	1

Regional final
6	Arkansas State
3	North Carolina A&T

=== Region 4 ===
First round Consolation first round
4	Louisiana Tech	0
13	Youngstown State	2
5	Fairleigh Dickinson	2
12	Sam Houston State	0
Lower round 1
4	Louisiana Tech	1
12	Sam Houston State	2

Second round Consolation second round
13	Youngstown State	2
5	Fairleigh Dickinson	0
Lower final
5	Fairleigh Dickinson	1
12	Sam Houston State	2

Regional final
13	Youngstown State
12	Sam Houston State

=== Finals ===
Finals first round Consolation first round
1	McKendree	2
13	Youngstown State	0
2	Nebraska	2
6	Arkansas State	0
Lower round 1
13	Youngstown State	1
6	Arkansas State	2

Finals second round Consolation second round
1	McKendree	1
2	Nebraska	2
Lower final
1	McKendree	1
6	Arkansas State	2

National championship
2	Nebraska
6	Arkansas State
