= High Point Panthers =

Athletics teams of High Point University

- University: High Point University
- NCAA: Division I
- Conference: Big South (primary); Atlantic 10 (men's lacrosse); MAC (women's rowing)
- Athletic director: Dan Hauser
- Location: High Point, North Carolina
- Varsity teams: 17
- Basketball arena: Qubein Center
- Baseball stadium: George S. Erath Field at Coy O. Williard Baseball Stadium
- Other venues: Millis Center (volleyball); Vert Track, Soccer and Lacrosse Stadium (track, soccer, lacrosse)
- Nickname: Panthers
- Colors: Purple and white
- Mascot: Prowler the Panther
- Website: highpointpanthers.com
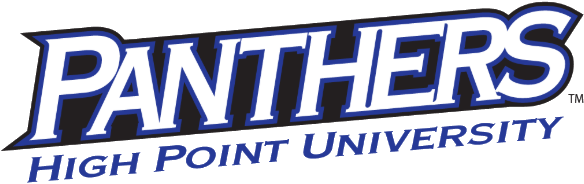

The High Point Panthers are the 17 varsity athletic teams that represent High Point University (HPU) in High Point, North Carolina, United States. All of HPU's varsity teams compete at the NCAA Division I level. All sports except men's lacrosse and women's rowing compete in the Big South Conference. The men's lacrosse team joined the Atlantic 10 Conference after the 2022 season. Women's rowing was added in 2024–25, initially competing as an independent until joining the new rowing league of the Mid-American Conference in 2025–26. The Panthers joined Division I in 1999, after having been NCAA Division II and being members of the National Association of Intercollegiate Athletics (NAIA) prior to 1992. HPU was a founding member of the North State Conference, which is now the NCAA Division II Conference Carolinas.

Dan Hauser became HPU's athletic director in May 2014. He replaced Craig Keilitz, who held the position from 2008 to 2014. Keilitz replaced Woody Gibson, who had been AD since 1999. HPU's other previous athletic directors include Jerry Steele, who was also basketball coach from 1972 to 2003, and Virgil Yow, who was also a coach.

HPU's main athletic facilities are the Millis Center (volleyball), Vert Stadium (track, soccer and lacrosse) and Williard Stadium (baseball). In September 2018, ground broke on the Qubein Center (full name: Nido and Mariana Qubein Arena and Conference Center). The facility hosts men's and women's basketball and seats 4,500 spectators. It was originally scheduled to open for the 2020–21 school year, but construction delays brought on by COVID-19 delayed the opening to 2021–22.

== Teams ==
A member of the Big South Conference, High Point sponsors teams in eight men's and nine women's NCAA sanctioned sports:

| Men's sports | Women's sports |
|---|---|
| Baseball | Basketball |
| Basketball | Cross country |
| Cross country | Golf |
| Golf | Lacrosse |
| Lacrosse | Rowing |
| Soccer | Soccer |
| Track and field | Track and field |
| | Volleyball |

=== Men's basketball ===
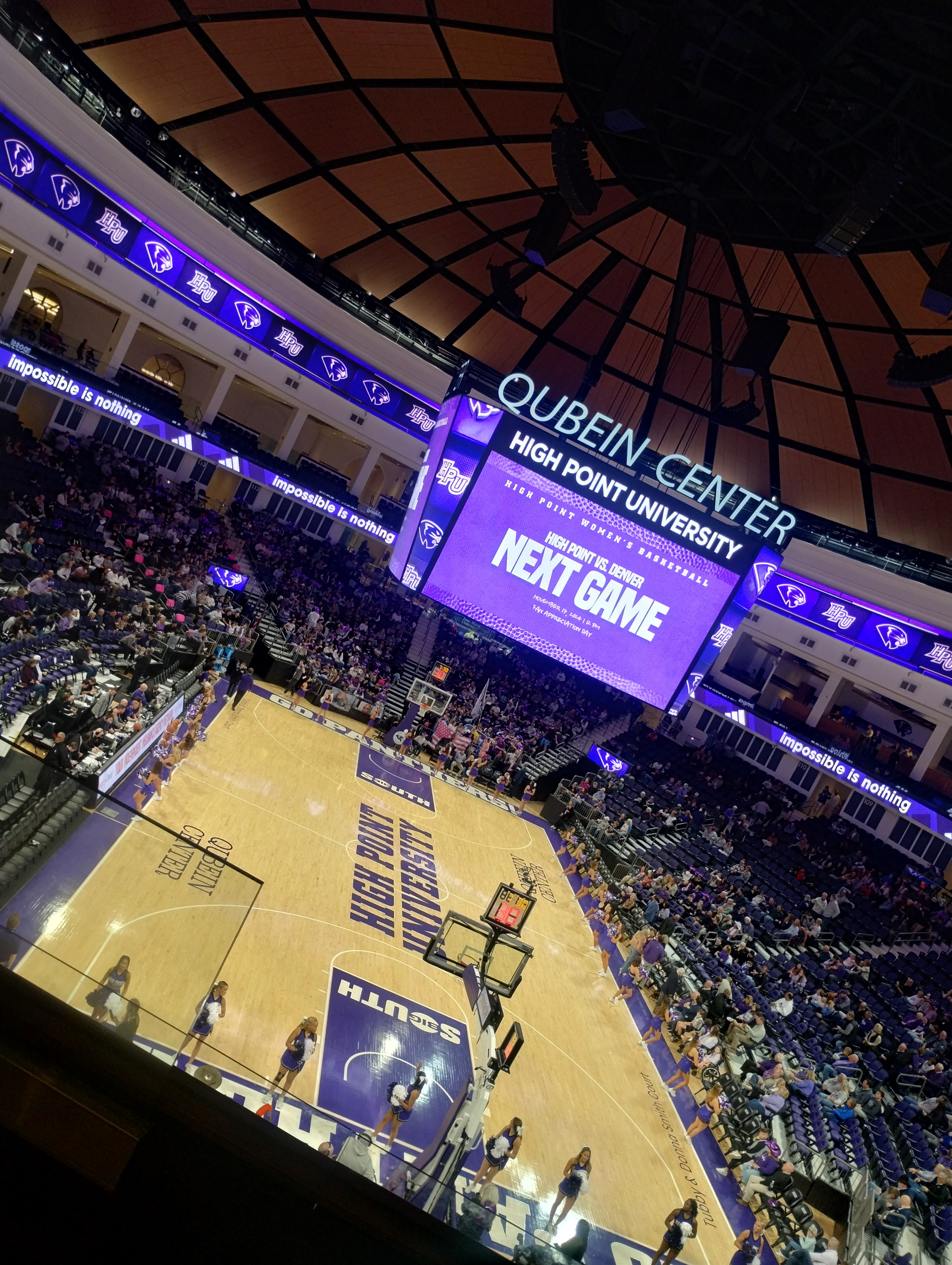
Qubein Center, home to the High Point basketball teams

The team began varsity play in 1927–28 and was a charter member of the North State Conference (now Conference Carolinas) from 1930–31 through 1996–97, when the school began its transition to NCAA Division I. High Point won 15 regular-season championships and 13 tournament championships while in the North State Conference and participated in the NAIA national tournament in 1939, 1942, 1946, 1951, 1964, 1965, 1969 and 1979. High Point participated in the NCAA Division II Tournament in 1997.

HPU moved up to NCAA Division I in 1999–2000 and joined the Big South Conference. The Panthers made it to the Big South final in their first year of eligibility in 2002 and also made it to the championship game in 2004. HPU has had two Big South Players of the Year: Danny Gathings (2003–04) and Arizona Reid (2006–07, 2007–08). Reid is the only player in conference history with over 2,000 points and 1,000 rebounds and was A.P. All-American honorable mention twice. In 2011–12, guard Nick Barbour broke Reid's Division I scoring record, finishing his career with 2,121 points. Barbour became the second player in team history to lead HPU in scoring four times in a row. The Panthers made their first Division I NCAA Tournament in 2025.

The team's prominent alumni include former head coach Tubby Smith, former NBA head coach Gene Littles and former NBA referee Joe Forte. Littles is the program's all-time leading scorer, with 2,398 points from 1965 to 1969. George Nostrand played at High Point from 1941 to 1944 and went on to play in the first NBA game ever in 1946. Along with Cherry, High Point's prominent head coaches have been Virgil Yow (1933–45, 1953–62), J.D. Barnett (1971–72), Jerry Steele (1972–2003) and Bart Lundy (2003–09).

=== Women's basketball ===
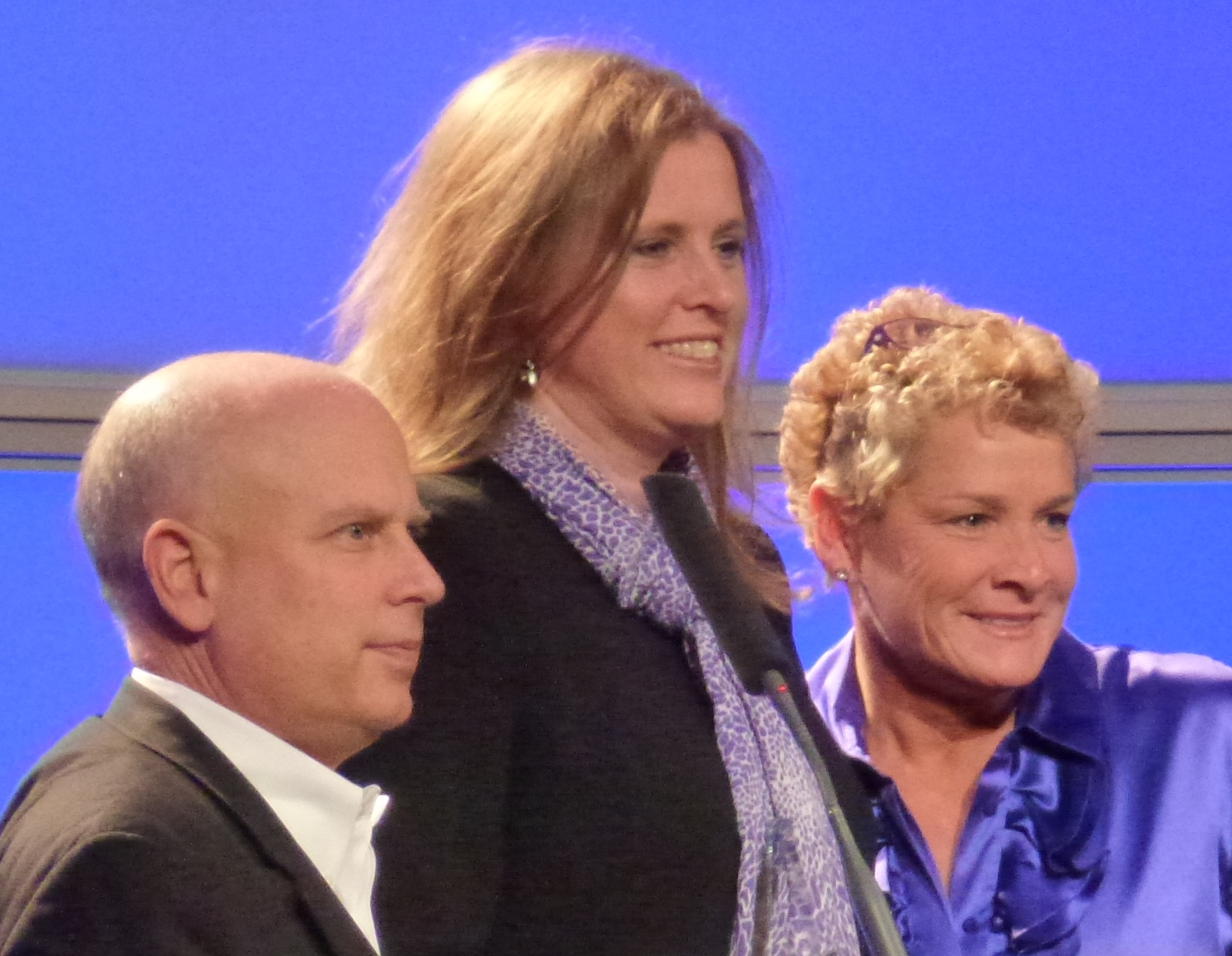
Jennifer Hoover, Head Coach, accepting Maggie Dixon Rookie Coach of the Year Award

High Point University started women's basketball in 1967–68 and the team is now coached by DeUnna Hendrix (pronounced de-AH-nah), who was hired in May 2012. Hendrix served as assistant coach for one season under Jennifer Hoover. In Hoover's only season in 2011–12, the team achieved a record of 20–13. Her performance earned her the Maggie Dixon Rookie of the Year award, presented to a coach with remarkable success in their rookie year as a head coach. Hoover was then hired by her alma mater, Wake Forest, to be head coach in May 2012.

High Point won the 1978 AIAW Division II national championship with a 92–88 overtime win over South Carolina State. The following year, High Point set a program record with 33 wins but was unable to defend its national title, falling to Tougaloo in the AIAW Region II Tournament.

High Point completed its transition to Division I in 1999–2000 and joined the Big South Conference. High Point has finished above .500 in the Big South in every season since 2000–01. HPU won the Big South regular season championship in 2006–07, the team's only title since joining the league. High Point finished second in the Big South regular season and made it to the Big South tournament final in 2011–12, just the second time the team finished in the top two in the standings and made it to the championship in the same season. High Point earned its second WNIT berth in 2012.

High Point's all-time leading scorer is current Spring Hill College head coach Karen (Curtis) McConico who scored 2,612 points from 1994 to 1998. The team's most prominent alumnus is former Duke head coach and current television color commentator Debbie Leonard who played for High Point from 1970 to 1974.

The first female player played on a college men's basketball team in 1944 when then High Point men's coach Virgil Yow recruited Nancy Isenhour to be on the team. She started three games.

=== Cross country and track & field ===
Head coach Mike Esposito leads HPU's men's and women's cross country, indoor and outdoor track & field teams. Esposito was coach at Mount Tabor High School in Winston-Salem, North Carolina, for 19 years and has been High Point's head coach since 2005. HPU's longest-tenured coach was Bob Davidson, who led HPU for 39 seasons into the early 2000s. The Panthers' strongest events are cross country and long-distance events in track & field. HPU's men's cross country team won three-straight Big South Championships from 2002 to 2004 and has been runner-up at the Big South Championship from 2007 to 2011. The women's cross country team won its first Big South Championship in 2011 and Esposito was named conference Coach of the Year. The Panthers have had two NCAA Division I All-Americans in track & field; Jemissa Hess in the indoor mile in 2005 and Sydney Horn in the pole vault in 2021. Two alumni have competed in the Olympics: Taylor Milne represented Canada in the 1,500-meter in 2008 and Tamas Kovacs represented Hungary in the marathon in 2012. Other notable alumni include former Tennessee head coach Bill Webb and current ZAP Fitness runners Jesse Cherry and Cole Atkins. HPU's Vert Stadium is named in honor of Dick Vert, an HPU trustee who was a cross country and middle-distance runner and graduated from HPU in 1960.

=== Football ===
High Point University had football from the 1920s until 1950 and was a member of the North State Conference. HPU played at NC State in the 1930 season opener, which was the first night football game played in the state of North Carolina. The team played at Albion Millis Stadium, now the site of Vert Stadium. There is often speculation about High Point restarting a football program but no timeline has been announced.

=== Men's golf ===
Men's golf is one of High Point's longest-running sports behind men's basketball. The team moved up to NCAA Division I in 1999 and had its best Big South Championship finish, third, in 2006. HPU's highest individual finisher was Ryan Taylor, who placed second in 2007. The team's most prominent alumnus is Roger Watson, who played for HPU from 1963 to 1966, won national club championships in 1974 and 1975 and has since been inducted to several halls of fame, including the NAIA Hall of Fame and North Carolina Sports Hall of Fame. High Point named Brady Gregor head coach in 2016, replacing Greg Flesher (2012–16).

=== Women's golf ===
High Point University started Women's Golf in 2003–04 and the team achieved its highest Big South Championship finish – second – in 2019. HPU has had two individual Big South Women's Golf Champions, Ann Marie Dalton in 2008 and Samantha Vodry in 2019. Vodry also advanced to the NCAA Regionals via at-large bid as the first post-season qualifier in HPU history in 2021. Alexis Bennett was named Head Coach on July 22, 2016, and has led the team to 4 top-4 conference finishes and 5 tournament titles.

=== Men's lacrosse ===
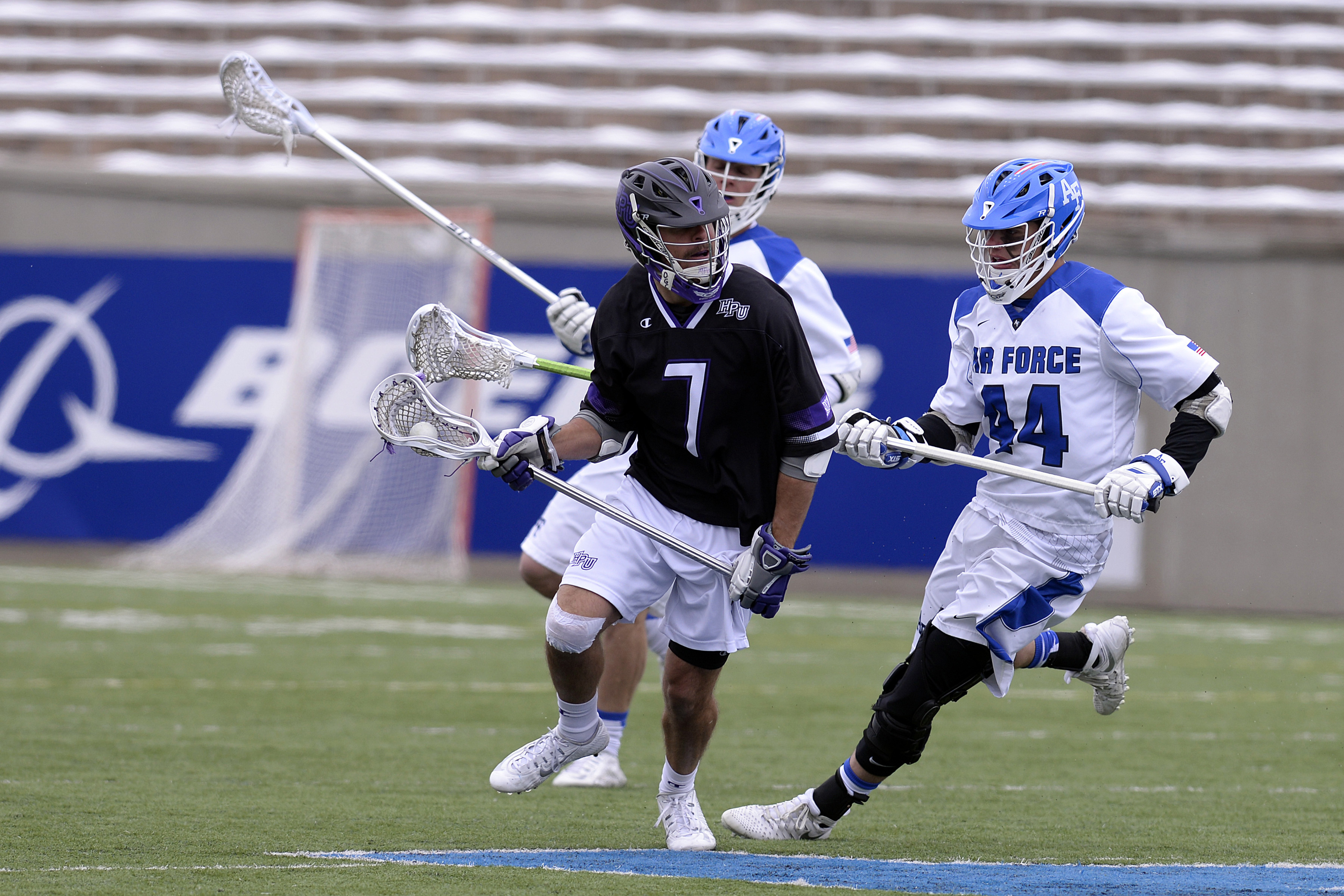
A lacrosse game between High Point and Air Force in 2016

High Point University announced the addition of men's lacrosse as part of the university's $2.1 billion growth plan in September 2010. HPU's first varsity men's lacrosse season will be 2013. HPU named Jon Torpey head coach in 2010 and he joined HPU on a full-time basis in June 2011. Torpey's college teammate at Ohio State, Pat Tracy, as well as former Maryland attacker Michael Phipps joined HPU as assistant coaches in 2011. High Point brought in 20 players for the 2011–12 season, who redshirted in preparation for the inaugural varsity season. The 2012–13 roster features 39 players, including three from North Carolina and three from Canada.

=== Women's lacrosse ===
High Point is a member of the Big South Conference

High Point University announced the addition of women's lacrosse in 2009 and won the National Lacrosse Conference championship in its first season of 2011. The Panthers went 15–4 in their inaugural campaign, setting a record for wins by a first-year NCAA Division I program. The previous record was 13–4 by Navy in 2008. The team is coached by Lyndsey Boswell, who was named NLC Coach of the Year in 2011. She had been head coach at St. Andrews Presbyterian College and was an NCAA Division II All-American while playing at Pfeiffer. HPU attacker Grace Gaeng transferred from Maryland and was named NLC Player of the Year in 2011. The team repeated with a 15–4 record in 2012 and won the NLC regular season. High Point moved to the Big South Conference in 2013 and has won the conference tournament in 2013, 2014, and 2017. In the 2013 NCAA tournament, they lost 18–7 to Loyola (Maryland) and in 2014 they fell 18–4 to Notre Dame.

=== Men's soccer ===
High Point men's soccer began play in 1929. In their second season in 1930, the Panthers hosted the first-ever intercollegiate soccer game held below the Mason–Dixon line, beating Catawba College 1–0. The team was dropped in 1942 due to World War II but was then brought back in 1971 and moved to Division I in 1999.

HPU recorded its best overall record and won its first-ever Big South Regular Season Championship in 2010 when the team went 16-4-1 overall and perfect 8-0-0 in the Big South. The Panthers reached the Big South Championship twice but lost both times, falling to Winthrop in 2006 and Coastal Carolina in 2010. Karo Okiomah became HPU's first Big South Player of the Year and All-American after scoring 12 goals in 16 games for the Panthers in 2010. The team achieved national rankings in 2010 and 2012 and is the only HPU team to achieve a Div. I ranking to date. Dustin Fonder was named High Point's head coach in 2007 and was named Big South Coach of the Year in 2009 and 2010.

=== Women's soccer ===
High Point University began women's soccer in 1992 and won Big South Tournaments in 2003, 2007, 2009 and 2010, advancing to the NCAA Tournament each of those seasons. The program holds a Big South record with six-straight shutouts in conference tournament games, not allowing a goal in either the 2009 or 2010 tournaments. HPU tied for its first Big South regular season title in 2010. In its most recent NCAA Tournament game at Maryland on November 12, 2010, High Point led 1–0 before falling to the Terrapins, 4–1. The team is coached by former Francis Marion head coach Marty Beall.

=== Women's volleyball ===
High Point University began its volleyball program in 1973 and moved up to NCAA Division I in 1999. The Panthers tied for their first Big South regular season championship in 2008, going 26–7 overall and 13–3 in league play. Former Dayton and Maryland assistant coach Jason Oliver was named HPU's head coach in 2009 and led the team to its first-ever Big South Tournament title and NCAA appearance in 2010. Audie Gonzalez was named tournament MVP. The Panthers played No. 12 Duke, taking a 3–0 loss at Cameron Indoor Stadium in their first NCAA Tournament game on December 3, 2010. In 2016, Tom Mendoza was named head coach, and in his first year, he led High Point to a 23–10 record and another Big South conference title. In the NCAA tournament, the Panthers lost to No. 7 North Carolina in three sets.

=== Men's and women's tennis ===
High Point University stopped its tennis program in 2008. Most recently the 2003 Men's team won the Big South Tennis Championship defeating fellow Big South member Winthrop University. The Panthers, who played in five consecutive NAIA national championship tournaments (1970–75) finished #4 in 1974 NAIA Men's National Championship in Kansas City, Missouri. Coach Ray Alley was named 1975 NAIA men's Tennis National Coach of the Year. Peter Ranney was named NAIA Honorable Mention All-American in 1975.

Finland stars from the early 1990s and 2000s included All-Conference, Rolex Champion, and Athletes of the Year players Vesa Kemppainen, Pekka Pohjamo, and Tavvi Surousa. High Point star Pekka Pohjamo won the singles and doubles at the 1994 Rolex ITA Collegiate Invitational. He teamed with American Donald Marriott to take the doubles title. Donald Marriott who played in the early 1990s also garnered All-Conference, Millis-Scholar Athlete, and All-District awards. Marriott would also win multiple "City of High Point" tennis championships 96,98,03 and North Carolina State Doubles titles including the 2003 NC State Mixed Doubles Championship. He is currently the Men's and Women's Head Tennis coach for Lee's McRae College in Banner Elk, North Carolina.
