= Longwood Lancers =

Athletics teams of Longwood University

- University: Longwood University
- Nickname: Lancers (official); Blue and White (unofficial)
- NCAA: Division I
- Conference: Big South (primary); MAC (field hockey)
- Athletic director: Tim Hall
- Location: Farmville, Virginia
- Varsity teams: 18 (19 beginning in 2028)
- Basketball arena: Joan Perry Brock Center
- Baseball stadium: Charles Buddy Bolding Stadium
- Softball stadium: Lancer Field
- Soccer stadium: Longwood University Athletics Complex
- Colors: Blue and white
- Mascot: Elwood
- Website: longwoodlancers.com

The Longwood Lancers are the intercollegiate athletics teams that represent Longwood University, located in Farmville, Virginia. The University's 18 men’s and women’s teams compete at the National Collegiate Athletic Association (NCAA) Division I level. Since 2012, the Lancers have been a member of the Big South Conference.

In March 2022, the Longwood Lancers men's basketball and women's basketball teams won Big South Tournament titles, punching the first tickets to the NCAA basketball tournament in the school’s Division I history. Only three times in Big South Conference history has the same institution claimed the men's and women's basketball titles in the same year. Both teams also won regular-season titles in the 2021-2022 season, with the men's team in sole possession of first place and the women's team tied for first. In 2024, the Lancers won the Big South men's basketball tournament for the second time in three years and earned a berth in the NCAA Division I Tournament.

Since joining the Big South, the Longwood softball team has won five Big South tournament crowns and three regular-season titles. The Lancers have appeared in the NCAA Division I softball tournament four times.

The Lancer mascot is Elwood, a horse, and the official logo features a horse’s head atop a lance. The Lancers' fight song is "Hail to Longwood U."

== Sports sponsored ==
Men's sports	Women's sports
Baseball	Basketball
Basketball	Cross country
Cross country	Field hockey
Golf	Golf
Soccer	Lacrosse
Tennis	Soccer
Track and field^{†}	Softball
	Tennis
	Track and field^{†}
	Volleyball (2028)
† – Track and field includes both indoor and outdoor

== Conference affiliations ==
Longwood is a member of the Big South Conference

- 1972–73 to 1981–82: Association for Intercollegiate Athletics for Women (Note: Women's sports only)
- 1976–77 to 1980–81: NCAA Division III Independent (Note: Men's sports only)
- 1981–82 to 1982–83: NCAA Division II Independent (Note: Its women's sports joined the NCAA during the 1982–83 school year.)
- 1983–84 to 1987–88: Mason–Dixon Conference
- 1988–89 to 1994–95: NCAA Division II Independent
- 1995–96 to 2002–03: Carolinas–Virginia Athletic Conference (Note: Now currently known as the Conference Carolinas since the 2007–08 school year.)
- 2003–04: NCAA Division II Independent
- 2004–05 to 2011–12: NCAA Division I Independent
- 2012–13 to present: Big South Conference

== Championships ==
Longwood softball has won the Big South tournament 5 times in the 10 years the team has been in the league.

=== Men's Basketball ===
- Big South Tournament Championships (2): 2022, 2024
- Big South Regular Season Championships (1): 2022

=== Women's Basketball ===
- Big South Tournament Championships (1): 2022
- Big South Regular Season Championships (1): 2022 (tied for first place)

=== Softball ===
- Big South Tournament Championships (5): 2013, 2015, 2016, 2017, 2019
- Big South Regular Season Championships (5): 2015, 2016, 2019, 2022, 2023

=== Baseball ===
- Division II South Atlantic Regional Championship (1): 1991

=== Men's Soccer ===
- Atlantic Soccer Conference Tournament Championship (2): 2008, 2011

=== Women's Lacrosse ===
- National Lacrosse Conference Championship (2): 2009, 2010

=== Women's Golf ===
- Division II National Golf Coaches Association National Championships (4): 1987-88, 1990, 1993, 1995

=== Men's Golf ===
- Big South Tournament Championship (1): 2023

Women's Tennis

- Big South Regular Season Championship (1): 2026

== Longwood in the NCAA Tournament ==
=== Men's Basketball ===
Year	Seed	Round	Opponent	Result
2022	#14 South	First round	#3 Tennessee	L 56–88
2024	#16 South	First round	#1 Houston	L 46–86

=== Women's Basketball ===
Year	Seed	Round	Opponent	Result
2022	#16	First Four; First round	#16 Mount St. Mary's #1 NC State	W, 74-70; L, 68–96

=== Softball ===
Year	Record	Pct	Regional
2013	0–2	.000	Knoxville Regional
2015	1–2	.333	Knoxville Regional
2016	2–2	.500	Harrisonburg Regional
2017	2–2	.500	Knoxville Regional
2019	0–2	.000	Knoxville Regional
Totals	5–10	.333	
