= Southland Bowling League =

- Association: NCAA
- Founded: 2015
- Folded: 2023
- Sports fielded: Bowling
- Division: National Collegiate
- No. of teams: 8
- Headquarters: Frisco, Texas
- Website: Southland Bowling

The Southland Bowling League (SBL) was a National Collegiate Athletic Association (NCAA) bowling-only conference. The SBL was founded in 2015 for schools that sponsor women's bowling teams, but did not have bowling sponsored by their primary conferences. The SBL champion received an automatic bid to the NCAA Bowling Championship since the NCAA first awarded such bids in 2018. While the conference operated independently, administrative services were provided by the Southland Conference. The SBL merged into Conference USA (CUSA) after the 2022–23 season, with CUSA inheriting the SBL's automatic championship berth.

The SBL received at least three bids to the NCAA Championship in each season of its existence. Following the inaugural SBL Championship, four league teams (Arkansas State, Sam Houston State, Stephen F. Austin, and Vanderbilt) received at-large bids to the 2015 NCAA Championships, filling half of the eight available spots. The same four teams would receive at-large bids to the 2016 NCAA Bowling Championships and 2017 NCAA Bowling Championships. In 2018, the first year for automatic bids to the NCAA Championship and also the first year for a 10-team championship event, Vanderbilt earned the automatic bid and Arkansas State and Sam Houston received at-large bids. In 2019, Sam Houston State earned the automatic bid, while Arkansas State, Stephen F. Austin, and Vanderbilt received at-large bids. In 2021, Vanderbilt earned the automatic bid, while Arkansas State, Louisiana Tech, Sam Houston, and Youngstown State received at-large bids. In 2022, six of the eight members made the NCAA Bowling Championships field with Vanderbilt earning the automatic bid, while Arkansas State, Louisiana Tech, Sam Houston State, Stephen F. Austin, and Youngstown State all receiving at-large bids. In the league's final season in 2023, the same six members from 2022 made the NCAA Bowling Championships field, with Arkansas State earning the automatic bid.

In July 2021, it was announced that Sam Houston and Stephen F. Austin left the Southland for the Western Athletic Conference. After the two schools announced they would join the WAC in fall 2022, they were expelled by the Southland Conference and joined the WAC a year ahead of the originally planned schedule. Despite leaving the Southland Conference in all other sports, Sam Houston and Stephen F. Austin remained in the SBL and both participated in the 2022 and 2023 SBL Championships.

== Final members ==
All of the SBL's final members now compete in CUSA bowling except Stephen F. Austin, which dropped bowling after the 2024–25 season.

School	Location	Founded	Type	Approximate Enrollment	Joined	Nickname	Primary conference during SBL membership	Current primary conference
Arkansas State University	Jonesboro, AR	1909	Public	13,600	2015	Red Wolves	Sun Belt Conference	
Louisiana Tech University	Ruston, LA	1894	Public	11,300	2015	Lady Techsters	Conference USA	Sun Belt Conference
Sam Houston State University	Huntsville, TX	1879	Public	19,600	2015	Bearkats	Southland Conference (2015–2021); Western Athletic Conference (Note: The Western Athletic Conference changed its name to United Athletic Conference in July 2026.) (2021–2023)	Conference USA
Stephen F. Austin State University	Nacogdoches, TX	1921	Public	13,000	2015	Ladyjacks	Southland Conference (2015–2021); Western Athletic Conference (2021–2023)	Southland Conference
Tulane University	New Orleans, LA	1834	Private	13,500	2015	Green Wave	American Conference (Note: Known before July 2025 as the American Athletic Conference.)	
Valparaiso University	Valparaiso, IN	1859	Private (Independent Lutheran)	4,500	2015	Beacons	Missouri Valley Conference	
Vanderbilt University	Nashville, TN	1873	Private	12,700	2015	Commodores	Southeastern Conference	
Youngstown State University	Youngstown, OH	1908	Public	11,400	2018	Penguins	Horizon League	

On August 7, 2018, the SBL and Youngstown State University announced that Youngstown State's bowling program was joining the league for competition beginning in the 2018–2019 season. Youngstown State replaced Monmouth, who accepted an invitation to join the MEAC.

== Previous members ==
School	Location	Founded	Type	Approximate Enrollment	Nickname	Joined	Left	Primary conference during SBL membership	Current bowling conference
Monmouth University	West Long Branch, NJ	1933	Private	6,200	Hawks	2015	2018	Metro Atlantic Athletic Conference (Note: Monmouth joined the Colonial Athletic Association, now known as the Coastal Athletic Association, in 2022. The Metro Atlantic Athletic Conference would change its name to Metro Conference in July 2026.)	Northeast Conference (Note: While media still use the "Northeast Conference" name, the conference's official name has been NEC since October 2025.)

== SBL Championship ==
Year	Venue Location	Champion	Runner-up	Third	Fourth	Fifth	Seventh
2015	Del-Mar Lanes; Houston, TX	Vanderbilt	Arkansas State	Valparaiso	Sam Houston State	Monmouth; Stephen F. Austin	Louisiana Tech; Tulane
2016	AMF All Star Lanes; Kenner, LA	Arkansas State	Sam Houston State	Vanderbilt	Stephen F. Austin	Monmouth; Tulane	Louisiana Tech; Valparaiso
2017	Hijinx Lanes; Jonesboro, AR	Vanderbilt	Arkansas State	Stephen F. Austin	Tulane	Monmouth; Sam Houston State	Louisiana Tech; Valparaiso
2018	USA Bowl Dallas; Dallas, TX	Arkansas State	Stephen F. Austin	Vanderbilt	Monmouth	Louisiana Tech; Sam Houston State	Tulane; Valparaiso
2019	USA Bowl Dallas; Dallas, TX	Sam Houston State	Vanderbilt	Stephen F. Austin	Arkansas State	Louisiana Tech; Tulane	Valparaiso; Youngstown State
2021	Colonial Bowling Lanes; Harahan, LA	Vanderbilt	Louisiana Tech	Sam Houston State	Arkansas State	Stephen F. Austin; Youngstown State	Tulane; Valparaiso
2022	Colonial Bowling Lanes; Harahan, LA	Vanderbilt	Youngstown State	Louisiana Tech	Arkansas State	Sam Houston; Tulane	Stephen F. Austin; Valparaiso
2023	Rowlett Bowlarama; Rowlett, TX	Arkansas State	Sam Houston	Louisiana Tech	Youngstown State	Vanderbilt; Stephen F. Austin	Tulane; Valparaiso

=== All-Tournament Teams ===
Year	Most Valuable Bowler	Team
2015	Nicole Mosesso (Vanderbilt)	Sarah Lokker (Arkansas State) • Sadie Jasinski (Valparaiso) • Stephanie Schwartz (Stephen F. Austin) • Torrie Decker (Valparaiso) • Giselle Poss (Vanderbilt)
2016	Jordan Richard (Arkansas State)	Stephanie Zavala (Sam Houston State) • Brooke Wood (Arkansas State) • Jadee Scott-Jones (Arkansas State) • Carrie Hopkinson (Sam Houston State) • Katelyn Reth (Monmouth)
2017	Katie Stark (Vanderbilt)	Maria Bulanova (Vanderbilt) • Jordan Richard (Arkansas State) • Stephanie Schwartz (Stephen F. Austin) • Janine Kuwahara (Sam Houston State) • Tiera Gulum (Tulane)
2018	Jordan Richard (Arkansas State)	Leah Glazer (Arkansas State) • Stephanie Schwartz (Stephen F. Austin) • Dakota Faichnie (Stephen F. Austin) • Kristin Quah (Vanderbilt) • Jackie Evans (Monmouth)
2019	Bea Hernandez (Sam Houston State)	Madysen Keller (Sam Houston State) • Maria Bulanova (Vanderbilt) • Samantha Gainor (Vanderbilt) • Sarah Gill (Stephen F. Austin) • Denishya Waller (Arkansas State)
2021	Mabel Cummins (Vanderbilt)	Angelica Anthony (Vanderbilt) • Allie Leiendecker (Louisiana Tech) • Danielle Jedlicki (Louisiana Tech) • Denise Blankenzee (Sam Houston State) • Carlene Beyer (Stephen F. Austin)
2022	Mabel Cummins (Vanderbilt)	Amanda Naujakoas (Vanderbilt) • Emma Dockery (Youngstown State) • Emma Wrenn (Youngstown State) • Allie Leiendecker (Louisiana Tech) • Brooklyn Buchanan (Arkansas State)
2023	Maggie Thoma (Arkansas State)	Faith Welch (Arkansas State) • Elise Chambers (Sam Houston) • Denise Blankenzee (Sam Houston) • Megan Grams (Youngstown State) • Lindsay Manning (Louisiana Tech)

== NCAA Bowling Championship participation ==
Teams	Appearances	Years	Best Result
Arkansas State	15	2008, 2009, 2010, 2011, 2012, 2013, 2014, 2015, 2016, 2017, 2018, 2019, 2021, 2022, 2023	Runner-up 2008, 2021, 2023
Louisiana Tech	3	2021, 2022, 2023	Regional Finalist 2022
Sam Houston	11	2011, 2013, **2014**, 2015, 2016, 2017, 2018, 2019, 2021, 2022, 2023	**Champion** 2014
Stephen F. Austin	6	2015, **2016**, 2017, **2019**, 2022, 2023	**Champion** 2016, 2019
Valparaiso	1	2012	Tied 5th 2012
Vanderbilt	17	2006, **2007**, 2008, 2009, 2010, 2011, 2012, 2013, 2014, 2015, 2016, 2017, **2018**, 2019, 2021, 2022, **2023**	**Champion** 2007, 2018, 2023
Youngstown State	3	2021, 2022, 2023	4th 2021

Bold: Champion
Italics: Runner-Up

== See also ==
- NCAA bowling championship
