= North Dakota State Bison =

College sports team

- University: North Dakota State University
- NCAA: Division I (FBS)
- Conference: Summit League (primary); Mountain West (football); Pac-12 (wrestling)
- Athletic director: Matt Larsen
- Location: Fargo, North Dakota
- Varsity teams: 16 (8 men, 8 women)
- Football stadium: Fargodome
- Basketball arena: Scheels Center
- Baseball stadium: Newman Outdoor Field
- Softball stadium: Tharaldson Park
- Soccer stadium: Dacotah Field
- Other venues: Bentson Bunker Fieldhouse
- Colors: Green and yellow
- Mascot: Thundar
- Fight song: On Bison; We are the Pride
- Website: gobison.com

The North Dakota State Bison are the athletic teams of North Dakota State University (NDSU), which is located in the city of Fargo, North Dakota. The teams are often called the "Thundering Herd". The current logo is a bison.

== Sports sponsored ==
Men's sports	Women's sports
Baseball	Basketball
Basketball	Cross country
Cross country	Golf
Football	Soccer
Golf	Softball
Track and field^{†}	Track and field^{†}
Wrestling	Volleyball
† – Track and field includes both indoor and outdoor.

A member of the Summit League, North Dakota State University sponsors teams in eight men's and eight women's NCAA sanctioned intercollegiate sports: The football team competes as a member of the Mountain West Conference. The wrestling team competes as an affiliate member of the Pac-12 Conference.

In the past, North Dakota State has been a member of the North Central Conference, the Great West Football Conference, the Missouri Valley Football Conference, the Big 12 Conference, and the United Soccer Conference. It has also been an independent.

== National championships ==
The Bison have won thirty NCAA national championships, both at the Division I and Division II levels.

=== Team ===
Sport	Association	Division	Year	Opponent/Runner-up	Score
Women's basketball (5)	NCAA	Division II	1991	Southeast Missouri State	81–74
Women's basketball (5)	NCAA	Division II	1993	Delta State	95–63
Women's basketball (5)	NCAA	Division II	1994	Cal State San Bernardino	89–56
Women's basketball (5)	NCAA	Division II	1995	Portland State	98–85
Women's basketball (5)	NCAA	Division II	1996	Shippensburg	104–78
Men's cross country (1)	NCAA	College	1972	South Dakota State	84–143 (-59)
Football (18)	NCAA	Division II (poll)	1965	Middle Tennessee State; Cal State Los Angeles	—
Football (18)	NCAA	Division II (poll)	1968	San Diego State	—
Football (18)	NCAA	Division II (poll)	1969	Montana	—
Football (18)	NCAA	Division II (game)	1983	Central State (OH)	41–21
Football (18)	NCAA	Division II (game)	1985	North Alabama	35–7
Football (18)	NCAA	Division II (game)	1986	South Dakota	27–7
Football (18)	NCAA	Division II (game)	1988	Portland State	35–21
Football (18)	NCAA	Division II (game)	1990	IUP	51–11
Football (18)	NCAA	Division I FCS	2011	Sam Houston State	17–6
Football (18)	NCAA	Division I FCS	2012	Sam Houston State	39–13
Football (18)	NCAA	Division I FCS	2013	Towson	35–7
Football (18)	NCAA	Division I FCS	2014	Illinois State	29–27
Football (18)	NCAA	Division I FCS	2015	Jacksonville State	37–10
Football (18)	NCAA	Division I FCS	2017	James Madison	17–13
Football (18)	NCAA	Division I FCS	2018	Eastern Washington	38–24
Football (18)	NCAA	Division I FCS	2019	James Madison	28–20
Football (18)	NCAA	Division I FCS	2021	Montana State	38–10
Football (18)	NCAA	Division I FCS	2024	Montana State	35–32
Softball (1)	NCAA	Division II	2000	Kennesaw State	3–1
Women's indoor track and field (1)	NCAA	Division II	2002	Saint Augustine's	67½–45
Wrestling (4)	NCAA	Division II	1988	Nebraska–Omaha	88–81 3/4
Wrestling (4)	NCAA	Division II	1998	South Dakota State	112–78
Wrestling (4)	NCAA	Division II	2000	Central Oklahoma	91.5–75
Wrestling (4)	NCAA	Division II	2001	South Dakota State	98.5–91

=== Individual ===
The Bison have won two individual event championships, all at the Division I level.

Sport	Association	Division	Year	Champion	Event
Men's track and field (2)	NCAA	Division I	2019	Payton Otterdahl	Indoor Shot Put
Men's track and field (2)	NCAA	Division I	2019	Payton Otterdahl	Weight Throw

== Individual sports ==
=== Football ===
The Bison football team, which since 1993 played their home games at the Fargodome, was a dominant force in Division II. Through January 2022, they have won 17 NCAA national titles. Eight were at the Division II level (1965, 1968, 1969, 1983, 1985, 1986, 1988, and 1990) before moving up to Division I-AA (now FCS) in 2004 where they have won nine national championships (2011, 2012, 2013, 2014, 2015, 2017, 2018, 2019, 2021). NDSU is the only team at any level of NCAA football to have won five straight national championships. The program was the winningest in the history of the NCAA Division II North Central Conference, with 17 outright championships and 27 total league football titles. The program has also been quite successful since moving up to the D1 FCS classification. In 2006 the Bison posted a 10–1 record that included a win over FBS Ball State. During a 2006 game against FBS Minnesota, NDSU led for much of the game, but a last-second field goal attempt was blocked by Minnesota, resulting in a 10–9 loss. The following season, the Bison won their first Great West Football Conference championship and achieved the number 1 ranking in major FCS polls for a majority of the season. During this season the 2007 Bison football team defeated FBS members Central Michigan University and the University of Minnesota. In 2010 the Bison defeated the FBS Kansas Jayhawks, 6–3, for their first win over a Big 12 program. The Bison won the 2011 FCS national championship, defeating Sam Houston State University, 17–6. The 2011 title was their ninth overall. The Bison returned to the FCS championship game in 2012 and soundly defeated Sam Houston State University in a rematch of the 2011 title game, 39–13. Expectations were high entering the 2013 season. The season commenced with a game against the Kansas State Wildcats, the reigning Big 12 Champions. The Bison took a quick lead, but let a 7–7 halftime score get away from them; trailing 21–7 in the third quarter. The Bison finished the game with an 18-play 80-yard drive that used 8 1/2 minutes, leaving 28 seconds on the clock for the Wildcats, trailing by 3. NDSU Linebacker Grant Olson intercepted the first pass attempt by the Wildcats, sealing their 7th win over FBS teams since their move to FCS. ESPN College GameDay broadcast an episode from Fargo. The Bison finished the season 15–0 with a victory over the Towson Tigers, 35–7. Despite a cast of new coaches, the 2014 Bison finished the season with a 15–1 record, including another win over Big 12 Iowa State and won their fourth consecutive national championship. ESPN College GameDay was broadcast from Fargo for the 2nd consecutive year.

In 2016, the Bison upset AP-ranked 13 Iowa at Kinnick Stadium. This still stands as NDSU's most notable win, and one of the highest profile upsets in Division I football history. Despite the impressive win, the remainder of the season would not be like the previous years for the Bison. NDSU would give up the Dakota Marker for the first time since the 2009 season. They would also see their national title streak end at five after a loss to James Madison in the semifinals at the Fargodome, who would eventually win the National Championship that season.

In the 2017 season, NDSU would return to the title game and avenge their loss the previous season, defeating James Madison in Frisco 17-13. The 2018 season would see one of the Bison's most dominant seasons, especially since 2013, when the team went 15-0 for the second time in program history. The team only played one team in a one score game (the Dakota Marker game against #3 South Dakota State), and accomplished a score differential of 28.9 points). Before the team's eventual victory over South Dakota State in the FCS semifinals, coach Chris Klieman was announced as the next head coach at Kansas State. Klieman was allowed to finish out his season at NDSU, beating SDSU in the semis and then Eastern Washington in the National Championship game.

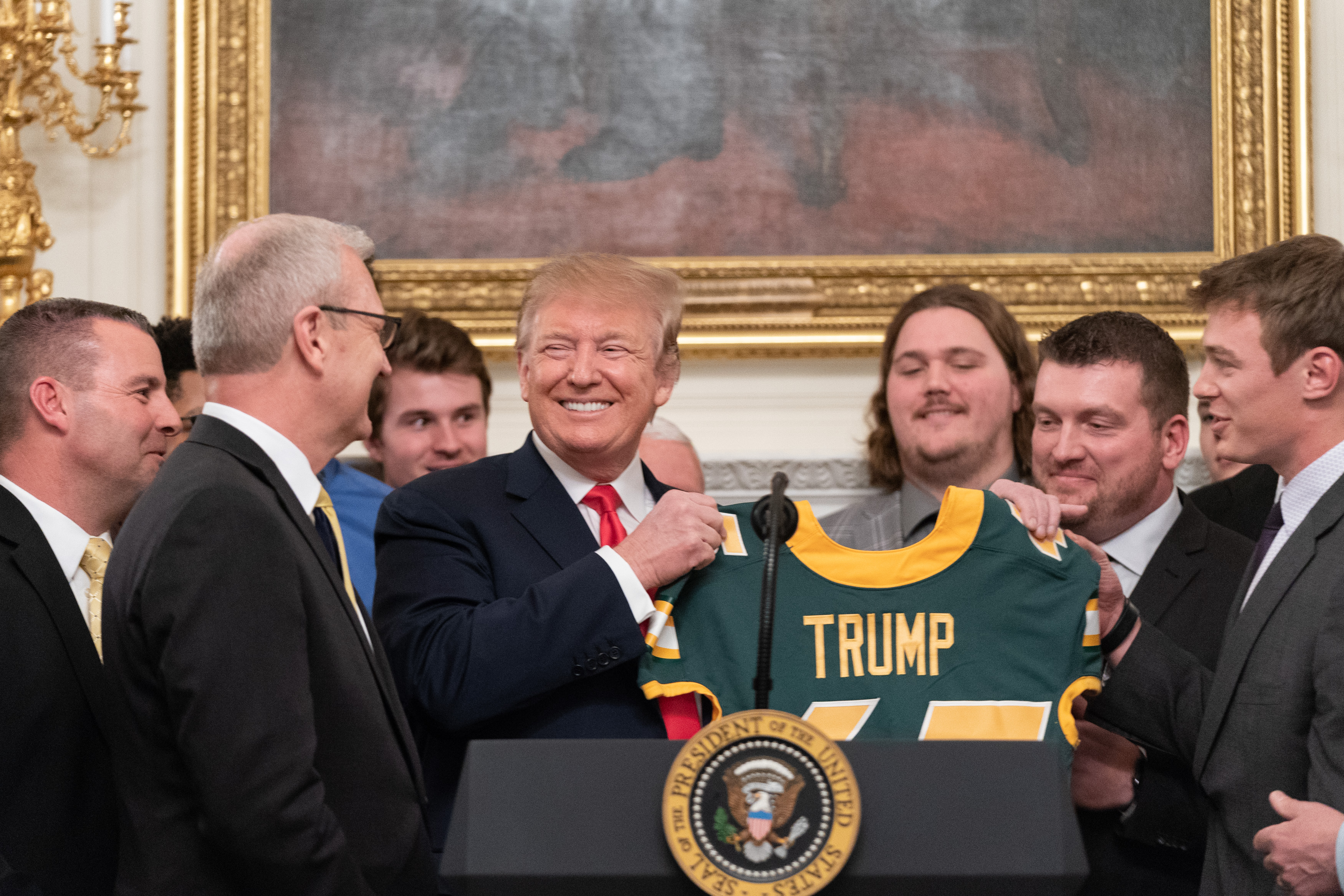
NDS players with President Donald Trump at the White House in 2019

The 2019 season started a new leaf for NDSU, with Matt Entz being announced as the next head coach for the Bison after previously serving as the team's defensive coordinator the last several seasons. As far as the on-field product was concerned, it was one of the best in program history again. With Trey Lance at the helm for the Bison in his redshirt freshman season, NDSU achieved a 16-0 record for the first time in program history and for only the second time in Division I football history (1894 Yale being the only other program to reach the mark). This was highlighted by the National Championship game win against James Madison in which NDSU won on a game-sealing interception in the redzone with under five seconds remaining. Unfortunately after the season ended, the COVID-19 pandemic hit and the 2020 FCS season was postponed to the Spring of 2021. This wouldn't be the first unfortunate thing to happen to the school in that academic year, as the football team would have a very rare year in the team's history, going 7-3 in the shortened season. The Bison also ended their national championship streak of 3 titles (between 2018 and 2020) after they lost to eventual champion Sam Houston in the FCS quarterfinals.

The 2021 season could be categorized as a "return to their roots" type season for NDSU, after the team went 14-1. The team's only loss being in the Dakota Marker game in Brookings to 4th ranked SDSU. The Bison dominated their way to their ninth national championship, beating playoff rival James Madison in the semifinals in a close game, and then beating Montana State in the title game 38-10.

However, in the 2022 season the Bison would stumble again. The team went 12-3, losing more than 1 game in a season for only the second time since 2011. NDSU lost their first game to an FBS opponent since losing to Minnesota in 2009, after they lost a three-point game at Arizona. The blows would continue as the team not only did not reclaim the Dakota Marker (losing 23-21 at home to 2nd ranked South Dakota State), but would fall to the Jackrabbits again in the National Championship game. The 2023 edition of North Dakota State would also have their struggles, losing three games again, this time in the regular season and did not receive a seed heading into the FCS playoffs. The Bison would manage to beat Drake, Montana State in walk-off fashion, avenging their loss to South Dakota earlier in the season, before being bested by Montana in the FCS semifinals. It was also announced earlier that same week that fifth year head coach Matt Entz would be leaving Fargo to join the USC staff as the linebackers coach and assistant head coach. Tim Polasek was soon named as the next head coach for the Bison.

The 2024 season was a return to form for the program, with Polasek at the helm. The Bison would post a 14–2 record, defeating Montana State in the 2025 NCAA Division I Football Championship Game to claim the program's 10th FCS title and 18th overall title. In the process, NDSU would reclaim the Dakota Marker trophy for the first time since 2019. They would defeat South Dakota State again in the FCS semifinals, starting their first winning streak over their archrivals for the first time since they won 3 in a row in 2018 and 2019. Following the win over the Jacks, NDSU would rise to number 1 in both the FCS STATS and coaches polls for the first time since October 2022. NDSU would fall to a FBS opponent for the second time since 2016, losing a 5 point game to Deion Sanders' Colorado in the season opener. The Bison would also claim a share of the 2024 MVFC title, their first since 2021. In 2025, NDSU went 12–1, including an undefeated regular season. That also meant that the Bison defeated the Jacks to keep the Dakota Marker for the second year in a row and increased their winning streak to 3 over their rivals to the South. They also defeated UND in Grand Forks after falling to them to the last time NDSU visited. NDSU would also win their first outright MVFC title since 2021. However, this year would land in the Bison history books, just not in the best way. NDSU drew the number one seed in the FCS playoffs and would faceoff against Illinois State in the second round. The Bison would fall to the Redbirds, having given up a 13 point lead with 2 minutes left, to be eliminated before the quarterfinal round for the first time in their history.

Then, on February 9, 2026, North Dakota State announced they would be leaving the MVFC and the FCS to join the Mountain West Conference of the FBS on July 1, 2026.

=== Men's Basketball ===
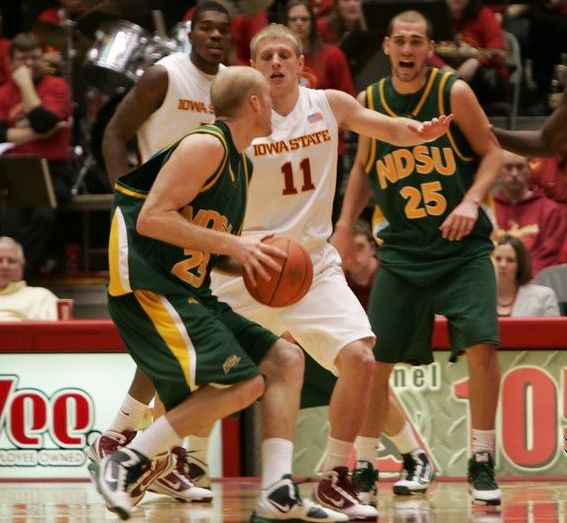
NDS v Iowa State game in 2010

The Bison basketball program includes a men's and a women's team. The teams play at the Scheels Center inside the Sanford Health Athletic Complex (SHAC). They won five NCAA National Championships during the decade (1991, 1993–1996). The men's basketball team won an upset victory over the University of Wisconsin on January 21, 2006, potentially increasing its chances of being accepted into a conference. The Bison also upset Marquette University on their home court at their tournament, 64–60, on December 2, 2006.

On February 28, 2009, the Bison men's basketball team captured the Summit League regular-season championship, the school's first at the Division I level, by defeating Oral Roberts 75–72 in Tulsa, OK. Two weeks later, NDSU earned its first men's basketball NCAA berth by winning the Summit League Tournament played at Sioux Falls, SD. The Bison defeated Centenary 83–77 in the tourney quarterfinals, stopped Southern Utah 79–67 in the semifinals, and edged Oakland 66–64 in the championship game. The Bison traveled to Minneapolis for a first-round game with the defending national champions, the Kansas Jayhawks, and fell 84–74. NDSU's tournament appearance marked the first time in almost 35 years that a Division I men's program qualified for the tournament in its first season of eligibility.

2013 NDSU season highlights included a win over Notre Dame for their first ever win over an ACC team. NDSU advanced to the NCAA tournament for a 2nd time and received a #12 seed. They defeated #5 Oklahoma 80–75 in a second-round matchup of the NCAA basketball tournament and fell to San Diego State, one win short of the Sweet 16.

In 2014, NDSU won the Summit League Tournament and advanced to their 3rd NCAA basketball tournament as a #15 seed, eventually falling to #2 seed Gonzaga 86–76.
Several years later, the Bison men's team surprised the Summit League and won the conference tournament, advancing to the NCAA tournament for the fourth time in program history. NDSU would be handed the 16 seed in the East, and was selected to play in the First Four. The Bison beat NC Central in the program's second tournament win, before falling to top-seeded Duke in the first round.

The Bison appeared ready to repeat as champions in the Summit League in the 2019-20 season. They tied South Dakota State for the regular season title, and then won the Summit League tournament for the fifth time in program history. Unfortunately, the NCAA tournament was canceled amid the COVID-19 pandemic.
NDSU would continue to appear in the conference tournament title game, but came up short in the 2020-21 season (loss to Oral Roberts), the 2021-22 season (loss to South Dakota State), and in the 2022-23 season (loss to Oral Roberts).

In the 2023–24 season, the Bison lost in the quarterfinals of the Summit League tournament for the first time since 2017, marking a downward turn for the typically successful program. The following season would be a rebound for the Bison though, winning 21 games including a program boosting win over Butler on December 10, 2024. This success would fall short though in the Summit League tournament, with the Bison failing to make it past the quarterfinals for the second season in a row.

In the 2025–26 season, the Bison was a return to form for the program. While the transfer portal continued to recycle the team every year, NDSU would end up going 27–8. They racked up the accolades, winning the outright Summit League regular season title and numerous league awards, and went into Sioux Falls with the top seeded in the 2026 Summit League men's basketball tournament. The Bison would run thru the tournament, that they had struggled in for the last couple years, and defeat North Dakota to win the program's sixth tournament title and earn their fifth NCAA tournament appearance. They would end up getting the 14th seed in the East and would draw 3rd seed Michigan State. The Bison would be outmatched by the Spartans of the Big Ten Conference, falling in the first round, 92–67.

=== Women's Basketball ===
North Dakota State's women's basketball team is the school's only basketball team to win a national championship at any level and is the school's only other program to win at least five national titles besides the football team. The women's basketball team was a dominant force in Division II throughout the 1990s, as the Bison won five Division II titles. However, since the school emerged from reclassification in 2008, the team has not accomplished much.

The Bison have only made it past the quarterfinal round of the Summit League tournament three times. Recently, the Bison have started to change under head coach Jory Collins. In Collins' second season as Bison head coach, NDSU went 15-9 overall and 9-7 in Summit League play, as the program's third Division I season with a winning record. His time at NDSU has also featured 4 out of the program's 5 total Summit League tournament wins.

The 2023–24 season was a start of a new era for Bison women's basketball not previously seen since their Division II days. NDSU would finish the season with a 22-12 record and an impressive 13-3 Summit League record to clinch the 2 seed in the conference tournament for the second season in a row. This time, the Bison made it to their first ever Summit League championship game against women's basketball powerhouse and longtime rival, South Dakota State. They would fall to the Jacks in a close game, but would also clinch a bid to the WNIT. The Bison would win their first postseason game in a home match against Montana, but fell several days later to Minnesota. The following season, the Bison would yet again hit the 20 win mark, but would fall in the conference tournament in the quarterfinal round. NDSU would receive a WNIT bid for the third season in a row, this time improving yet again on their previous season's success in the postseason and made it to the Great 8 round before falling to Troy.

In 2025–26, this hot streak continued. North Dakota State hit another milestone in defeating their rival, South Dakota State, in Brookings on January 17, 2026. It was NDSU's first win over their southern rival since January 4, 2015, and their first win in Brookings since December 4, 2010. It ultimately snapped a 24-game losing streak to the Jackrabbits. Several milestones continued to be hit as the season went on. On February 21, 2026, the Bison secured at least a share of their first ever Summit League regular season title, and locked down the top seed in the upcoming Summit League tournament. They would later secure the outright regular season title. The Bison would reach the Summit League championship game against South Dakota State yet again, but were unable to win the game. However, since they won the regular season title but didn't make the NCAA tournament, they received an automatic bid to the 2026 Women's Basketball Invitation Tournament, their first ever bid to the WBIT, and a top four seed. The Bison would win their first round game, but fall in their second round matchup. NDSU ended the season with a record of 29–5, by far the best record of their Division I era and most since the 1995–96 season.

=== Wrestling ===
The Bison wrestling program had success under coach Bucky Maughan, winning four NCAA Division II team National Championships (1988, 1998, 2000, 2001). Maughan retired in 2011 after 37 years and his successor is two-time NCAA All-American Roger Kish. Kish led the 2013–14 NDSU team to career highs in rankings and tournament placement since the Bison joined the Division I ranks. In 2013, NDSU earned its first D1 All American and four through 2015. The team is a member of the Pac-12 Conference.

In 2023, the Bison earned their next highest ranking in their Division I era at No. 15 before losing to No. 10 Minnesota. Later that same season, NDSU saw three wrestlers reach the All-American round, a record for the program. After the 2023–24 season ended, coach Roger Kish announced he was leaving Fargo to be the head coach at Oklahoma. He would be replaced by Obe Blanc, who had served on the NDSU staff for the last four seasons in as an assistant.

On April 1, 2026, North Dakota State announced they would be moving the wrestling program to the Pac-12 Conference on July 1, 2026.

=== Volleyball ===
The 2008–2009 season was when the school first became fully eligible for Division I competition. In December 2008 NDSU's women's volleyball team captured the Summit League's regular season and tournament championships (doing so with a perfect league record) to become the first program at the school to earn a berth in a Division I NCAA tournament. The Bison dropped their opening round match to the University of Minnesota.

=== Softball ===
In the spring of 2009, the Bison women's softball team won the Summit League tournament in Macomb, Illinois, becoming the school's third team to appear in an NCAA tournament in the calendar year. In its opening game in May, the Bison upset 9th-ranked Oklahoma, 1–0, in an 11-inning game that spanned two days due to a weather delay. The Bison won the regional with victories over Tulsa, 3–2 and 4–1, to advance to the Super Regional (Sweet Sixteen) of the tournament, where they were eliminated.
Since that season, the Bison have reached nine more NCAA tournaments, including a streak of six straight tournaments from 2014-19. However, the team has not reached a Super Regional since 2009.
Recently, the Bison stumbled since the COVID-19 pandemic caused the 2020 season to abruptly end after just a month. NDSU has not reached the NCAA tournament since 2019, and has not won the Summit League regular season title since 2019.

=== Baseball ===
The NDSU baseball team plays their home games at Newman Outdoor Field on the north side of campus. The team has not had a large amount of success compared to their Spring counterpart: NDSU's softball team. While the Bison won three North Central Conference titles while in Division II, after the school moved up to Division I in 2008 the team has only won the Summit League twice.

The Bison advanced to their first NCAA tournament in 2014 after winning the Summit League baseball tournament for the first time. However, they would go winless in their first national appearance. Later in 2021, NDSU would win the Summit League tournament for the second time in program history, upsetting Oral Roberts to advance to the program's second NCAA tournament appearance in Division I. This time, the Bison found their first national tournament win in a 6-1 victory over Nevada at the Stanford Regional.

While the 2022 season did not see the Bison return to the NCAA tournament, the team did achieve yet another first. The team won the Summit League regular season title for the first time in program history, finishing with a 17-5 record in conference play which was another high for the program. In the Summit League tournament, the team fell to fourth seeded Omaha to be eliminated from the tournament.

The following season, 2023, the team hosted their first Summit League tournament. In that tournament, NDSU entered as the 2nd seed. The Bison lost to South Dakota State to start the tournament, beat Omaha, but lost to the Jacks again to be eliminated in the final elimination game for the second year in a row.

After another campaign in 2024 that left the Bison staying at home in Fargo, they would find success in 2025 - winning the program's third Summit League tournament. In the NCAA tournament, the Bison would find their second-ever tournament win against Kansas. However, they would be eliminated by Creighton after also losing to Arkansas in the opening round.

=== Soccer ===
The North Dakota State Bison women's soccer team plays their home games at Dacotah Field nestled in between the school's training facility/basketball arena and the indoor track facility on the North side of campus.

The NDSU soccer program has only been in existence since 1995, when the program played their first season under coach Gordon Henderson in Division II. The team played at two different sites while in Division II. The Bison started at Cardinal Muench Seminary's field off of NDSU's campus. Then after the 1996 season, the team moved on campus for the first time playing on a field part of the Ellig Sports Complex on the northwest side of campus.

While in Division II, the team played in their first and only Division II tournament. In the 1999 season, the Bison placed second in the North Central Conference regular season. Since the conference did not have a full-league tournament, the top two teams were good enough to make the full Division II tournament. After that, the NCC started a conference tournament, in 2000 NDSU was the runner-up in the final game and missed the national tournament. Between that season and 2004, the Bison wouldn't finish high enough to make the conference tournament and did not see another Division II tournament. After the 2003 season, NDSU started their reclassification to Division I. During their reclassification years, the Bison started as Division I independents, joined the United Soccer Conference, and then finally joined the Summit League which has served as their conference of the future.

Starting in 2008, the Bison emerged from reclassification and finished 7th in the Summit League and missed the conference tournament. But then in 2009, the team made their first Summit League tournament, and lost in the championship game.

In 2010, the Bison women's soccer team achieved the program's first NCAA tournament bid with a victory over Western Illinois in the Summit League tournament final.

Since the 2010 season, NDSU would make the conference tournament 8 consecutive seasons, which included 4 runner-ups. However, the team has not reached a Division I tournament since 2010.

Under current head coach Mike Regan, the Bison have made three Summit League tournaments in his six seasons in Fargo, at one point missing the tournament for three seasons in a row. In 2024, the Bison won the Summit League regular season title for the first time since 2016. Unfortunately, this wouldn't manifest into success in the postseason, as NDSU would fall in the semifinals to Oral Roberts in PK's.

== Mascot ==
"Thundar" is the official mascot of NDSU athletics. The mascot, which resembles the American bison, comes from the term "thundering herd," a nickname given to NDSU athletic teams since changing its name from "Aggies" to "Bison" in 1919. While some form of a "Bison Mascot" has been used at NDSU athletic events since the mid-1960s, "Thundar" did not become the official mascot of the university until 1991.

== Media ==
NDSU athletics radio coverage rights are held by Radio FM Media with games also airing on the 24-station Bison Radio Network. TV rights for the Bison are held by Forum Communications, a Fargo-based communications company that owns TV stations affiliated with ABC, for all sports.

In addition to broadcast rights, the NDSU Bison also receive dedicated print coverage in Bison Illustrated. The monthly magazine brings readers behind the scenes coverage of NDSU teams, players, coaches, administration, and alumni. The magazine is distributed free of charge in locations around the Fargo-Moorhead area and is available via paid subscription for out-of-state readers.
