= List of NCAA Division I conference changes in the 2000s =

National Collegiate Athletic Association logo

NCAA Division I conference realignment refers to changes in the alignment of college or university athletic programs from one National Collegiate Athletic Association athletic conference to another.

== 2009–2010 ==
School	Sport(s)	Former Conference	New Conference
Air Force Falcons	Men's lacrosse	GWLL	ECAC Lacrosse
Albany Great Danes	Women's golf	America East	MAAC
Bellarmine Knights	Men's lacrosse	GWLL	ECAC Lacrosse
Boston University Terriers	Women's golf	America East	MAAC
Bryant Bulldogs	Full membership	Division I Independent	Northeast
Chicago State Cougars	Full membership (non-football)	Independent	Great West
Denver Pioneers	Men's lacrosse	GWLL	ECAC Lacrosse
Georgetown Hoyas	Men's lacrosse	ECAC Lacrosse	Big East
Hartford Hawks	Women's golf	America East	MAAC
Houston Baptist Huskies	Full membership (non-football)	Independent	Great West
Iona Gaels	Football	Division I FCS Independent	Dropped football
Marist Red Foxes	Football	(non-football)	Pioneer
NJIT Highlanders	Full membership (non-football)	Independent	Great West
Northern Colorado Bears	Baseball	Division I Independent	Great West
Northern Iowa Panthers	Baseball	MVC	Dropped baseball
North Dakota Fighting Sioux	Full membership	North Central (D-II)	Great West
Notre Dame Fighting Irish	Men's lacrosse	GWLL	Big East
NYIT Bears	Baseball	Division I Independent	Great West
Ohio State Buckeyes	Men's lacrosse	GWLL	ECAC Lacrosse
Penn State Nittany Lions	Men's lacrosse	ECAC Lacrosse	CAA
Quinnipiac Bobcats	Men's lacrosse	GWLL	ECAC Lacrosse
Rutgers Scarlet Knights	Men's lacrosse	ECAC Lacrosse	Big East
Seattle Redhawks	Baseball	(non-baseball)	Division I Independent
St. John's Red Storm	Men's lacrosse	ECAC Lacrosse	Big East
South Dakota Coyotes	Full membership	North Central (D-II)	Great West
Texas–Pan American Broncs	Full membership (non-football)	Independent	Great West
UMass Minutemen	Men's lacrosse	ECAC Lacrosse	CAA
Utah Valley Wolverines	Full membership (non-football)	Independent	Great West
Vermont Catamounts	Baseball	America East	Dropped baseball
Western Kentucky Hilltoppers	Football	Independent	Sun Belt

== 2008–2009 ==
School	Sport(s)	Former Conference	New Conference
Arizona State Sun Devils	Men's tennis	Pac-10	Dropped men's tennis
Bryant Bulldogs	All sports	Northeast-10 (Division II)	Independent
Cal State Bakersfield Roadrunners	Baseball	(non-baseball)	Independent
Campbell Fighting Camels	Football	(non-football)	Pioneer
Chicago State Cougars	Cross country, track & field, golf, and tennis	Independent	Great West
Cincinnati Bearcats	Women's lacrosse	Independent	Big East
Duquesne Dukes	Football	MAAC	NEC
Florida Atlantic Owls	Men's soccer	Atlantic Soccer	MAC
Gardner–Webb Runnin' Bulldogs	All sports except football	Atlantic Sun	Big South
Hawaii−Hilo Vulcans	Baseball	Division I Independent	Pacific West (Division II)
Houston Baptist Huskies	Cross country, track & field, golf, and tennis	Independent	Great West
Iona Gaels	Football	MAAC	Division I FCS Independent
La Salle Explorers	Football	MAAC	Dropped football
Louisville Cardinals	Women's lacrosse	Independent	Big East
Morehead State Eagles	Men's and women's indoor track & field	OVC	Dropped both sports
Morehead State Eagles	Women's golf	No team	OVC
NJIT Highlanders	Cross country, track & field, golf, and tennis	Independent	Great West
North Dakota Fighting Sioux	Football, cross country, track & field, golf, and tennis	North Central (D-II)	Great West
North Dakota Fighting Sioux	All sports except football, cross country, track & field, golf, and tennis	North Central (D-II)	Independent
North Dakota State Bison	Football	Great West Football	MVFC
Oregon Ducks	Baseball	(non-baseball)	Pac-10
Presbyterian Blue Hose	All sports	Independent	Big South
Philadelphia Rams	Men's soccer	Atlantic Soccer	CACC (D-II)
Samford Bulldogs	All sports	Ohio Valley	Southern
South Dakota Coyotes	Football, cross country, track & field, golf, and tennis	North Central (D-II)	Great West
South Dakota State Jackrabbits	Football	Great West Football	MVFC
SIU Edwardsville Cougars	All sports (non-football)	GLVC (Division II)	Independent
Texas–Pan American Broncs	Cross country, track & field, golf, and tennis	?	Great West
Utah Valley Wolverines	Cross country, track & field, golf, and tennis	Independent	Great West
Wayne State Warriors	Men's ice hockey	CHA	Dropped men's ice hockey

== 2007–2008 ==
School	Sport(s)	Former Conference	New Conference
Austin Peay Governors	Football	Division I FCS independent	Ohio Valley
Central Arkansas Bears	Football	Division I FCS independent	Southland Conference
Cincinnati Bearcats	Women's lacrosse	Club team	Independent
Delaware Blue Hens	Football	Atlantic 10	CAA
Florida Gulf Coast Eagles	All sports (non-football)	Independent (Division II)	Atlantic Sun
Hofstra Pride	Football	Atlantic 10	CAA
Houston Baptist Huskies	All sports	NAIA	Independent
IPFW Mastodons	All sports except men's volleyball	Independent	The Summit
James Madison Dukes	Football	Atlantic 10	CAA
Le Moyne Dolphins	Baseball	MAAC	Independent
Louisville Cardinals	Women's lacrosse	Club team	Independent
Maine Black Bears	Football	Atlantic 10	CAA
Massachusetts Minutemen	Football	Atlantic 10	CAA
New Hampshire Wildcats	Football	Atlantic 10	CAA
Northeastern Huskies	Football	Atlantic 10	CAA
North Carolina Central Eagles	All sports	CIAA (Division II)	Independent
North Dakota State Bison	All sports except football	Independent	The Summit
Presbyterian Blue Hose	All sports	South Atlantic (Division II)	Independent
Rhode Island Rams	Football	Atlantic 10	CAA
Richmond Spiders	Football	Atlantic 10	CAA
South Carolina Upstate Spartans	All sports (non-football)	Peach Belt (Division II)	Atlantic Sun
South Dakota State Jackrabbits	All sports except football, men's wrestling, and women's equestrian	Independent	The Summit
Temple Owls	Football	Independent	Mid-American
Towson Tigers	Football	Atlantic 10	CAA
UC Davis Aggies	All sports expect football	Independent	Big West
Valparaiso Crusaders	All sports except football	Mid-Continent	Horizon League
Villanova Wildcats	Football	Atlantic 10	CAA
William & Mary Tribe	Football	Atlantic 10	CAA

== 2006–2007 ==
School	Sport(s)	Former Conference	New Conference
Air Force Falcons	Men's ice hockey	CHA	Atlantic Hockey
Air Force Falcons	Wrestling	Division I independent	WWC
Austin Peay Governors	Football	Pioneer	Division I FCS independent
Birmingham–Southern Panthers	All sports (non-football)	Big South	SCAC (Division III)
Central Arkansas Bears and Sugar Bears	All sports expect football	GSC (Division II)	Southland
Central Arkansas Bears	Football	GSC (Division II)	Division I FCS Independents
Chicago State Cougars	All (non-football)	Mid-Continent	Division I independent
Florida Atlantic Owls	All sports (expect football, which joined Sun Belt in 2005–2006)	Atlantic Sun	Sun Belt
Louisiana–Monroe Warhawks	All except football	Southland	Sun Belt
Missouri State Bears	Men's cross country, men's tennis, men's track & field	MVC	Dropped all three sports
NJIT Highlanders	All (non-football)	Division II	Division I independent
North Dakota State Bison	Wrestling	Division I independent	WWC
Northern Colorado Bears	All sports except baseball and wrestling	Division I IndependentGreat West Football	Big Sky
Northern Colorado Bears	Wrestling	Division I independent	WWC
Northern Iowa Panthers	Wrestling	Division I independent	WWC
St. Francis (NY) Terriers	Baseball	NEC	Dropped baseball
South Dakota State Jackrabbits	Wrestling	Division I independent	WWC
Texas A&M–Corpus Christi Islanders	All sports (non-football)	Division I Independent	Southland
Utah Valley Wolverines	Wrestling	Division I independent	WWC
Wyoming Cowboys	Wrestling	Division I independent	WWC

== 2005–2006 ==
School	Sport(s)	Former Conference	New Conference
Army Black Knights	Football	Conference USA	Division I-A Independent
Boston College Eagles	All	Big East	ACC
Charlotte 49ers	All (non-football)	Conference USA	Atlantic 10
Cincinnati Bearcats	All	Conference USA	Big East
DePaul Blue Demons	All (non-football)	Conference USA	Big East
East Tennessee State Buccaneers	All (non-football)	Southern	Atlantic Sun
Florida Atlantic Owls	Football	Division I-AA Independent	Sun Belt
FIU Golden Panthers	Football	Division I-AA Independent	Sun Belt
FIU Golden Panthers	Men's soccer	Atlantic Soccer Conference	Conference USA
Georgia State Panthers	All (non-football)	Atlantic Sun	CAA
Idaho Vandals	All	Sun Belt	WAC
Kennesaw State Owls	All (non-football)	Peach Belt (Division II)	Atlantic Sun
Kentucky Wildcats	Men's soccer	MAC	Conference USA
Louisville Cardinals	All	Conference USA	Big East
Louisville Cardinals	Field hockey	MAC	Big East
Marquette Golden Eagles	All (non-football)	Conference USA	Big East
Marshall Thundering Herd	All	MAC	Conference USA
New Mexico State Aggies	All	Sun Belt	WAC
Northeastern Huskies	All except football and ice hockey	America East	CAA
North Florida Ospreys	All (non-football)	Peach Belt (Division II)	Atlantic Sun
Quinnipiac Bobcats	Men's ice hockey	Atlantic Hockey	ECAC Hockey
Quinnipiac Bobcats	Women's ice hockey	CHA	ECAC Hockey
Rice Owls	All	WAC	Conference USA
Sacramento State Hornets	Baseball	Division I Independent	WAC
Saint Louis Billikens	All (non-football)	Conference USA	Atlantic 10
South Carolina Gamecocks	Men's soccer	Division I independent	Conference USA
South Florida Bulls	All	Conference USA	Big East
Southeastern Louisiana Lions	Football	Division I-AA Independent	Southland
SMU Mustangs	All	WAC	Conference USA
Stephen F. Austin Lumberjacks	Baseball	(non-baseball)	Southland Conference
TCU Horned Frogs	All	Conference USA	Mountain West
Temple Owls	Football	Big East	Division I-A Independent
Troy Trojans	All except football	Atlantic Sun	Sun Belt
Tulsa Hurricane	All	WAC	Conference USA
UCF Golden Knights	All	Atlantic SunMAC (football)	Conference USA
Utah State Aggies	All	Big WestSun Belt (football)	WAC
UTEP Miners	All	WAC	Conference USA
Vermont Catamounts	Men's and women's ice hockey	ECAC Hockey	Hockey East

== 2004–2005 ==
School	Sport(s)	Former Conference	New Conference
Connecticut Huskies	Football	Division I-A Independent	Big East
Cal Poly Mustangs	Football	Division I-AA Independent	Great West
Clarkson Golden Knights	Women's ice hockey	Independent	ECAC Hockey
Detroit Titans	Baseball	Horizon	Dropped baseball
East Tennessee State Buccaneers	Football	Southern	Dropped football
Findlay Oilers	Ice hockey (men's and women's)	CHA	Dropped hockey
Longwood Lancers	All sports (non-football)	CVAC (Division II)	Division I Independent
Miami Hurricanes	All sports except baseball	Big East	ACC
Miami Hurricanes	Baseball	Division I Independent	ACC
North Dakota Fighting Sioux	Women's ice hockey	Independent	WCHA
North Dakota State Bison	All sports except football	North Central (D-II)	Division I Independent
North Dakota State Bison	Football	North Central (D-II)	Great West
Northern Colorado Bears	Football	Division I-AA Independent	Great West
Pace Setters	Baseball	Division I Independent	Northeast-10 (Division II)
Quinnipiac Bobcats	Women's ice hockey	Independent	CHA
Saint Mary's Gaels	Football	Division I-AA Independent	Dropped football
South Dakota State Jackrabbits	All sports except football	North Central (D-II)	Division I Independent
South Dakota State Jackrabbits	Football	North Central (D-II)	Great West
Southern Utah Thunderbirds	Football	Division I-AA Independent	Great West
Towson Tigers	Football	Patriot League	Atlantic 10
Troy Trojans	Football	Division I-A Independent	Sun Belt
UC Davis Aggies	All sports except football	CCAA (D-II)	Independent
UC Davis Aggies	Football	Division I-AA Independent	Great West
Virginia Tech Hokies	All sports	Big EastEWL	ACC

== 2003–2004 ==
School	Sport(s)	Former Conference	New Conference
Birmingham–Southern Panthers	All sports (non-football)	Independent	Big South
Centenary Gentlemen and Ladies	All sports except for women's gymnastics and men's and women's rifle	Independent	Mid-Con
Dallas Baptist Patriots	Baseball	Heartland Conference (D-II)	Independent
Drexel Dragons	Baseball	CAA	Dropped baseball
Drexel Dragons	Women's volleyball	CAA	Dropped women's volleyball
Elon Phoenix	All sports	Big South	SoCon
Fairfield Stags	Football	MAAC	Dropped football
Fairfield Stags	Men's ice hockey	MAAC	Dropped hockey
Iona Gaels	Men's ice hockey, men's & women's tennis	MAAC	Dropped all three sports
Jacksonville State Gamecocks	All sports except football and rifle	A-Sun	OVC
Jacksonville State Gamecocks	Football	Southland	OVC
Jacksonville State Gamecocks	Rifle	GARC	OVC
Lipscomb Bisons	All sports (non-football)	Independent	A-Sun
Morris Brown Wolverines	All sports	Independent	Discontinued athletics
Northern Colorado Bears	All	North Central (D-II)	Independent
Samford Bulldogs	All sports except football	A-Sun	OVC
Samford Bulldogs	Football	Division I-AA Independent	OVC
St. John's Red Storm	Football	Division I-AA Independent	Dropped football
South Florida Bulls	Football	Division I-A Independent	Conference USA
Southeastern Louisiana Lions	Football	No team	Division I-AA Independent
UMBC Retrievers	All sports (non-football)	NEC	America East
Utah State Aggies	Football	Division I-A Independent	Sun Belt
Utah State Aggies	Women's basketball	No team	Big West
Utah Valley Wolverines	All sports (non-football)	NJCAA	Independent
VMI Keydets	All sports	SoCon	Big South

== 2002–2003 ==
School	Sport(s)	Former Conference	New Conference
Central Florida Golden Knights	Football	Division I-A Independent	MAC
Findlay Oilers	Women's ice hockey	Great Lakes Women's Hockey Association	CHA
FIU Golden Panthers	Football	Started football	Division I-AA Independent
Howard Bison	Baseball	MEAC	Dropped baseball
Mercyhurst Lakers	Women's ice hockey	Great Lakes Women's Hockey Association	CHA
Niagara Purple Eagles	Women's ice hockey	ECAC	CHA
Sacramento State Hornets	Baseball	Big West	Independent
St. John's Red Storm	Football	Northeast	Division I-AA Independent
Wayne State Warriors	Women's ice hockey	Great Lakes Women's Hockey Association	CHA

== 2001–2002 ==
School	Sport(s)	Former Conference	New Conference
American Eagles	All (non-football)	CAA	Patriot League
Arkansas State Indians	Football	Big West	Sun Belt
Austin Peay Governors	Football	Division I-AA Independent	Pioneer
Boise State Broncos	All	Big West	WAC
Delaware Fightin' Blue Hens	All except football	America East	CAA
Davidson Wildcats	Football	Division I-AA Independent	Pioneer
Drexel Dragons	All (non-football)	America East	CAA
Georgetown Hoyas	Football	Division I-AA Independent	Patriot League
Hofstra Flying Dutchmen	All except football	America East	CAA
Idaho Vandals	Football	Big West	Sun Belt
Iowa State Cyclones	Baseball	Big 12	Dropped baseball
Jacksonville Dolphins	Football	Division I-AA Independent	Pioneer
Louisiana–Monroe Indians	Football	Division I-A Independent	Sun Belt
Louisiana Tech Bulldogs and Lady Techsters	All	Sun Belt	WAC
Middle Tennessee Blue Raiders	All	Division I-A Independent	Sun Belt
Morehead State Eagles	Football	Division I-AA Independent	Pioneer
New Mexico State Aggies	All	Big West	Sun Belt
North Texas Mean Green	All	Big West	Sun Belt
Richmond Spiders	All except football	CAA	Atlantic 10
TCU Horned Frogs	All	WAC	Conference USA
Towson Tigers	All except football	America East	CAA
Utah State Aggies	Football	Big West	Division I-A Independent
Western Kentucky Hilltoppers	Football	Ohio Valley	Gateway
Youngstown State Penguins	All except football	Mid-Continent	Horizon

== 2000–2001 ==
School	Sport(s)	Former Conference	New Conference
Army Cadets	Men's ice hockey	CHA	MAAC
Connecticut Huskies	Football	Atlantic 10	Division I-A Independent
FIU Golden Panthers	Men's soccer	TAAC	Atlantic Soccer Conference
Georgetown Hoyas	Football	MAAC	Division I-AA Independent
Nevada Wolf Pack	All	Big West	WAC
St. John's Red Storm	Football	Division I-AA Independent	Northeast
Virginia Tech Hokies	All except football & wrestling	Atlantic 10	Big East

== See also ==
- 1996 NCAA conference realignment
- 2005 NCAA conference realignment
- 2010–2014 NCAA conference realignment
