= Bob Backlund =

American professional wrestler (born 1949)

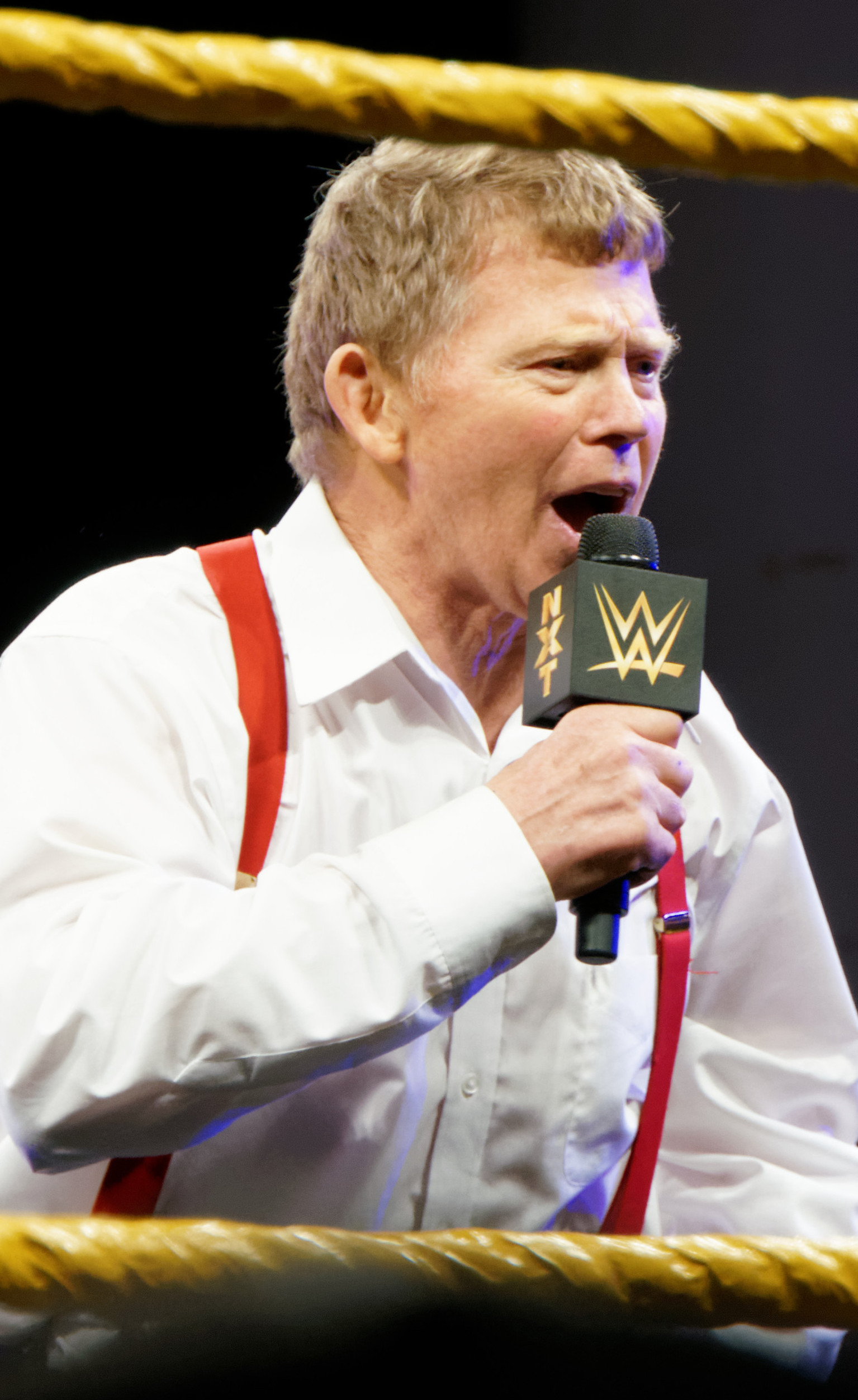
- Backlund in 2014

Personal information
- Born: Robert Louis Backlund; August 14, 1949 (age 77) Princeton, Minnesota, U.S.
- Education: North Dakota State University
- Spouse: Corki Backlund (m. 1967)
- Children: 1

Professional wrestling career
- Ring name(s): Bob Backlund; Mr. Backlund
- Billed height: 6 ft 1 in (185 cm)
- Billed weight: 234 lb (106 kg)
- Billed from: Princeton, Minnesota
- Trained by: Eddie Sharkey
- Debut: 1973
- Retired: 2018

Bob Backlund
- Full name: Robert Louis Backlund
- Weight: 190 lb (86 kg)
- Born: 14 August 1949 (age 77); Princeton, Minnesota, U.S.
- High school: Princeton High School
- College: North Dakota State University
- NCAA championships: 1
Medal record
NCAA Division II Wrestling Championships
Gold medal – first place	1971 Fargo	190 lbs

Robert Louis Backlund (born August 14, 1949) is an American retired amateur and professional wrestler. He is best known for his appearances in the World Wide Wrestling Federation/World Wrestling Federation from 1976 to 1984 and in the 1990s, where he held the WWWF/WWF Championship on two occasions. His 2,135-day reign is recognized as the second longest in the championship's history. (Note: Backlund lost the WWF Heavyweight Championship to Antonio Inoki after 648 days, but WWE does not officially acknowledge the title change and recognizes Backlund's reign as uninterrupted at 2,135 days.) Backlund was inducted into the WWE Hall of Fame in 2013.

Backlund began his career in amateur wrestling, competing for the North Dakota State University Bison from the late 1960s to early 1970s. He began training as a professional wrestler in 1973 under Eddie Sharkey and competed for the American Wrestling Association. He then wrestled for the National Wrestling Alliance and won the NWA Missouri Heavyweight Championship in 1976. Later that year he joined the World Wide Wrestling Federation, defeating Superstar Billy Graham for the WWWF Heavyweight Championship in 1978. He held the championship until 1983, where he lost it in a match against the Iron Sheik. Shortly after losing the title, Backlund left the WWF, but returned in 1992 and was in the 1993 Royal Rumble match for over an hour, a record held until the 2004 Royal Rumble. At the 1994 Survivor Series, Backlund won his second WWF Championship, defeating Bret Hart. He held the championship for three days, before losing it to Diesel at a house show in Madison Square Garden.

In addition to his time with the WWWF/WWF, Backlund has had success in Wrestling and Romance, Championship Wrestling from Florida, New Japan Pro-Wrestling and was inducted into the George Tragos/Lou Thesz Professional Wrestling Hall of Fame in 2016.

== Early life ==
Backlund was born in Princeton, Minnesota, in 1949. He is a graduate of Princeton High School, where he was a state finalist in wrestling. During his freshman year while at Waldorf College in Forest City, Iowa, Backlund was an All-American in both football and wrestling (191 lb [87 kg], finishing third). During his sophomore campaign, Backlund focused on wrestling and once again earned All-American honors (190 lb [86 kg] and national runner-up). Backlund was an amateur wrestler at North Dakota State University, winning the Division II NCAA Championship at 190 pounds in 1971. In 1972 Backlund moved up to the heavyweight class and finished fifth at the NCAA DII Nationals. He graduated from North Dakota State University with a degree in physical education.

== Professional wrestling career ==
=== Early career (1973−1976) ===
Backlund was trained for professional wrestling by renowned trainer Eddie Sharkey and made his debut for the American Wrestling Association (AWA) in 1973. After leaving the AWA, Backlund traveled the United States, working for the National Wrestling Alliance in its various territories. In 1974, Backlund wrestled in Texas, for Dory Funk Jr. and Terry Funk's Amarillo, Texas-based Western States Sports promotion. In March, he defeated Terry Funk for the NWA Western States Heavyweight Championship (the promotion's top title). Backlund held it for two months, before losing it to Karl Von Steiger in May.

In mid-1975, Backlund started working for Georgia Championship Wrestling (GCW). He teamed with Jerry Brisco to win the NWA Georgia Tag Team Championship from Toru Tanaka and Mr. Fuji in October 1975. They held the championship belts for two months before losing to Les Thornton and Tony Charles. In 1976, Backlund left Georgia for Championship Wrestling from Florida (CWF, NWA Florida). Here he teamed with Steve Keirn to defeat Bob Orton Jr. and Bob Roop for the NWA Florida Tag Team Championship. Backlund and Keirn lost the title to The Hollywood Blonds (Buddy Roberts and Jerry Brown) in October 1976. While working for NWA Florida, Backlund also wrestled in St. Louis, Missouri, for Sam Muchnick's St. Louis Wrestling Club. He defeated Harley Race to win the NWA Missouri Heavyweight Championship on April 23, 1976, and he lost the title to Jack Brisco on November 26.

=== World Wide Wrestling Federation / World Wrestling Federation (1976–1984) ===
==== Road to the title and early successes (1976−1981) ====
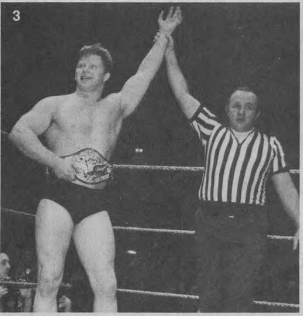
Backlund declared the WWWF Heavyweight Champion, February 20, 1978

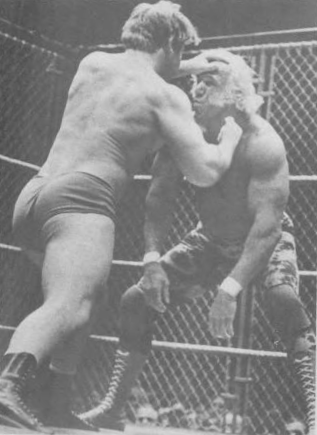
Backlund (left) versus Superstar Billy Graham (right) in a steel cage match in April 1978.

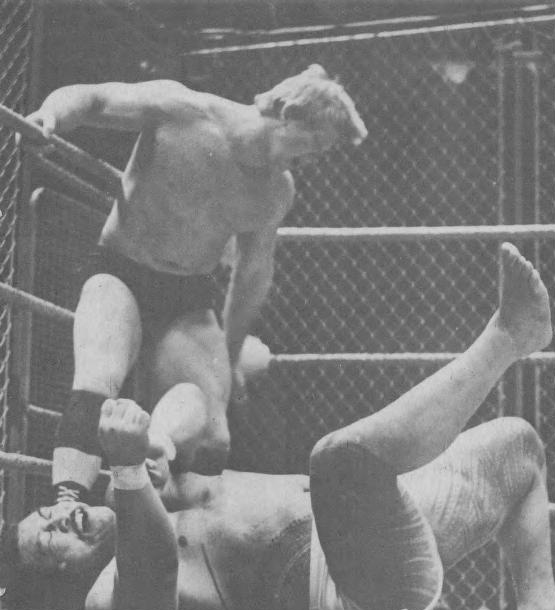
Backlund (top) kicks Peter Maivia (bottom) during their steel cage match, c. 1979

In late 1976, Backlund joined Vincent J. McMahon's World Wide Wrestling Federation. He was managed by "The Golden Boy" Arnold Skaaland. Less than four months into his WWWF run, Backlund received his first shot at the WWWF Heavyweight Championship against Superstar Billy Graham, but he lost by countout. Through 1977, Backlund received additional title shots at the champion, and his fortunes started to change; the two went to a double countout in one match, then Backlund defeated Graham, but by countout (the title can only change hands via pinfall or submission). On February 20, 1978, at Madison Square Garden, Backlund finally scored a pinfall victory over Graham and won the title, despite Graham's leg being on the rope during the pinfall.

Backlund's early challengers for the title included Spiros Arion, Mr. Fuji, Ivan Koloff, George "the Animal" Steele, and Ken Patera, and he had his first high-profile title match in Japan, defending against Antonio Inoki. He also won a series of rematches against Graham, including an April 1978 steel cage match at Madison Square Garden.

Three days after winning the WWWF Heavyweight Championship, Backlund clashed with the NWA World Heavyweight champion Harley Race in a rare "WWWF vs. NWA" title match. Both titles were on the line, but neither changed hands as the two fought to a 60-minute time limit draw. Defending against other champions became a recurring theme in Backlund's run with the title. He faced the AWA World Heavyweight champion (Nick Bockwinkel) and two NWA World Heavyweight champions (Harley Race four times and Ric Flair once). He defeated the NWA Florida Heavyweight champion Don Muraco. In August 1982, he battled Canadian International Heavyweight Champion Billy Robinson to a 63-minute curfew draw in Montreal.

Early in his run, Backlund and Peter Maivia formed a successful tag team and challenged for the WWWF World Tag Team Championship, held by the Yukon Lumberjacks. During a television taping that aired on WWF Championship Wrestling in October 1978, Maivia turned on Backlund and attacked him and Skaaland. In the immediate aftermath, fans for the first time got to see another side of Backlund's personality: that of a raving, ranting maniac when angered or pushed hard enough; in the post-match interview, Backlund screamed to interviewer Vince McMahon that he was going to "kill that son of a bitch!" Backlund eventually won a series of matches against Maivia, including a steel cage match in January 1979 at Madison Square Garden, although he was not able to fulfill his threat to end the life of Maivia.

In 1979, the World Wide Wrestling Federation (WWWF) became the World Wrestling Federation (WWF). On November 30, 1979, NWF Heavyweight champion Antonio Inoki defeated Backlund in Tokushima, Japan to win the WWF title. Backlund then won a rematch on December 6. However, WWF president Hisashi Shinma declared the re-match a no contest due to interference from Tiger Jeet Singh, and Inoki remained champion. Inoki refused the title on the same day, and it was declared vacant. Backlund later defeated Bobby Duncum in a Texas death match to regain the title on December 17. Inoki's reign is not recognized by WWE in its WWF/WWE title history.

On August 9, 1980, Backlund teamed with Pedro Morales to capture the WWF Tag Team Championship from the Wild Samoans at Showdown at Shea. Backlund and Morales were forced to vacate the title due to a then-extant WWF rule stating that no one can hold two championships at the same time. Backlund had more tag team success when he (along with Antonio Inoki) won the "1980 MSG Tag Team League Tournament", last defeating Hulk Hogan and Stan Hansen on December 10 in Osaka, Japan. Backlund and Inoki finished the tournament with seven wins and two double-countout decisions.

Also during 1980, Backlund and Hogan met in a series of highly publicized matches; although he scored several countout victories over Hogan, Backlund never was able to score a decisive victory over his charismatic young challenger, and Hogan – showing flashes of his future superstardom – proved to be one of Backlund's toughest opponents. Backlund was also able to overcome a challenge from Ken Patera, with whom he feuded on-and-off from 1978 until early 1981, including during Patera's reign as WWF Intercontinental Heavyweight champion.

==== Continued success (1981–1983) ====
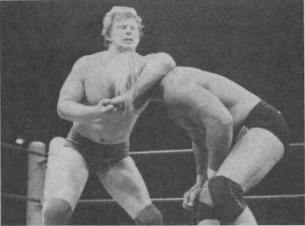
Backlund with Hulk Hogan in a headlock during a 1981 match

Backlund's WWF Heavyweight Championship was held up after a match in New York City against Greg "the Hammer" Valentine on October 19, 1981, after a dazed referee "accidentally" gave the championship belt to Valentine as part of the storyline, it constituted an interruption of Backlund's title reign. However, Backlund was billed as the WWF Heavyweight champion in other cities in the days following the controversy. In the early part of the 1980s, when no promotion held nationally televised events, it was not uncommon practice to "hold up" the title in one area (to build interest in a rematch the "former" champion would win) while ignoring the situation in other parts of the territory. On November 23, Backlund pinned Valentine for the "vacant in New York only" WWF Heavyweight Championship. A rematch for the title, held inside a steel cage at the Philadelphia Spectrum in January 1982, also saw Backlund emerge the winner, securing the victory when he hit a piledriver on Valentine onto the mat. Even with the title being held up against Inoki and Valentine, Backlund is recognized by WWE as having one continuous title reign from 1978 to 1983 as WWE champion.

Backlund continued to be successful into 1982 and 1983, successfully defending against a variety of contenders, ranging from Adrian Adonis, "Cowboy" Bob Orton, Big John Studd, Ivan Koloff, Magnificent Muraco and Sgt. Slaughter. One of his most memorable encounters came in mid-1982, when he won a steel cage match against "Superfly" Jimmy Snuka; in that match, at Madison Square Garden, Snuka scaled the top of the cage, intending to perform his Superfly Splash onto a prone Backlund to incapacitate him, but Backlund moved after Snuka began to fly through the air and went on to escape the cage. He also turned back a challenge from Superstar Billy Graham, who returned to the WWF in late 1982 wanting to reclaim the championship.

==== Title loss (1983–1984) ====
After having been popular with the fans from early on, in the final months of his title reign, Backlund changed his image, cutting his mop hair into a crew cut, wearing amateur wrestling singlets and losing muscle mass and definition. Fans seemingly grew weary of this "Howdy Doody" character (as the Grand Wizard had dubbed him). In 1983, he was voted the Wrestling Observer Newsletter's "Most Overrated Wrestler". Vince McMahon, who had bought the WWF from his father, wanted to put the title on the more charismatic and muscular Hulk Hogan. McMahon initially suggested Backlund turn heel and lose to Hogan, but when Backlund refused, a transitional champion became necessary between Backlund and Hogan. Backlund sustained a (kayfabe) arm injury when the Iron Sheik assaulted him with his Persian clubs and on December 26, 1983, Backlund lost the title to the Sheik when Backlund's manager, Arnold Skaaland, threw in the towel while Backlund was locked in the camel clutch.

Due to Backlund's injury, Hogan took over Backlund's rematch and became the new WWF World Heavyweight Champion. The injury was a television story only; Backlund wrestled the Iron Sheik at least three times for the title at house shows (including once at the Boston Garden, winning by disqualification), and also wrestled the Magnificent Muraco for the Intercontinental Heavyweight Championship, also at a non-televised house show.

Backlund continued to work for the WWF for a while after the title change, but did not receive another title shot for the WWF World Heavyweight Championship after Hogan's victory. On August 4, 1984, Backlund defeated Salvatore Bellomo in his last WWF match for eight years.

=== Semi-retirement (1984–1992) ===
After leaving the WWF, Backlund had a run in the short-lived Pro Wrestling USA, a joint promotion of the NWA and the AWA, meant to combat the national expansion of the WWF. In Pro Wrestling USA, Backlund unsuccessfully challenged AWA World Heavyweight champion Rick Martel. He dropped out of the professional wrestling scene in 1985.

Backlund made a surprise return in 1991 for Herb Abrams' short-lived Universal Wrestling Federation (UWF). At Beach Brawl, he defeated Ivan Koloff.

Backlund also wrestled for Newborn UWF and UWF International in Japan, in a series of matches with Nobuhiko Takada in 1988 and 1991.

During his time away from the ring, Backlund coached amateur wrestling at Bacon Academy and Rocky Hill High School in Connecticut.

=== World Wrestling Federation (1992–1997) ===
==== Initial return (1992–1994) ====
In 1992 with the World Wrestling Federation struggling to find a new direction, Backlund made a surprise return to the company on July 1, 1992, in White Plains, New York and defeated Skinner. After defeating Skinner in a rematch the following day and Steve Lombardi in July, Backlund went into hiatus while the company prepared to introduce him to a new generation of fans.

On the September 27, 1992 episode of Wrestling Challenge a vignette aired promoting the return of Backlund to the World Wrestling Federation. During his absence, the WWF had expanded into an international wrestling promotion, due in part to the colorful characters of the "Rock 'n' Wrestling Connection Era", which Hulk Hogan helped to kickstart eight years prior. Backlund, whose persona remained the same as it was in his heyday, seemed to be out of step with the evolution of the WWF. Many fans did not remember him, as he had left just prior to Vince McMahon's national expansion. Backlund made his official return on the November 28, 1992 episode of WWF Superstars of Wrestling and defeated Tom Stone. On the November 29 episode of Prime Time Wrestling he secured his first significant victory by defeating Repo Man.

Backlund began to tour full time on house shows at the end of November, defeating Papa Shango on multiple occasions. On November 19, 1992, he got his first opportunity for a championship, facing and then defeating Shawn Michaels by countout in Cadillac, Michigan. On November 28, he made his return to Madison Square Garden for the first time in over eight years, defeating Rick Martel. He closed out the year remaining undefeated in competition and being announced as a participant in the upcoming Royal Rumble.

At the 1993 Royal Rumble, Backlund, the number two entrant lasted sixty-one minutes and ten seconds, a duration record that stood until 2004, when Chris Benoit broke it. On January 29, 1993, he faced Shawn Michaels at Madison Square Garden, again defeating the Intercontinental Champion by countout. The following day Backlund finally sustained his first defeat in his comeback, losing by pinfall to Michaels at a house show in New Haven, Connecticut. This would be his only loss for some time as he continued to beat Michaels by countout in subsequent rematches. One of these untelevised matches was included on the home video, WWF Wrestling Grudge Matches.

Backlund's first WrestleMania appearance was at WrestleMania IX, where he was quickly pinned by Razor Ramon. On April 8, he faced Shawn Michaels at a WWF Superstars taping in Paris, France and was pinned. This began the first sustained losing streak of his WWF comeback, as Michaels defeated Backlund in subsequent rematches. On the May 2, 1993 episode of Wrestling Challenge . Backlund faced Lex Luger in a qualifying match for the upcoming King of the Ring tournament but was defeated by countout.

In May 1993 he rebounded to defeat Blake Beverly in several house show encounters. On the May 30, 1993 episode of All American Wrestling he battled Bam Bam Bigelow to a time limit draw. On the June 19, episode of WWF Mania he teamed with fellow veteran Tito Santana to defeat The Headshrinkers. On the June 20, episode of Wrestling Challenge Backlund was defeated by Doink the Clown. Entering the summer, Backlund found himself programmed into a house show series against fellow babyface Bret Hart. Hart defeated Backlund in their first encounter in Baltimore, Maryland on June 11, and the two faced off again the following day at Madison Square Garden. After a match that lasted over 32 minutes, Hart again defeated Backlund. The two wrestlers shook hands after the match.

Afterwards Backlund found himself sliding further down the card, losing to newcomers Mr. Hughes and Bastion Booger in numerous house show encounters in the summer of 1993. At "The SummerSlam Spectacular" on August 29, 1993, he again faced Intercontinental Champion Shawn Michaels and once more was defeated. Backlund entered the fall of 1993 now in the lower card, and he rebounded to defeat Damien Demento and Papa Shango in numerous house show encounters. On November 6, 1993, in Shamokin, Pennsylvania, Backlund faced yet another newcomer in Diesel, pinning him in their first match. Diesel would return the favor, pinning Backlund on November 12 in Winnipeg, Manitoba. This was followed by several additional losses to Diesel, and Backlund ended the second year of his comeback still mired in the midcard.

Backlund competed in the 1994 Royal Rumble, this time only lasting a little over twelve seconds. As the winter continued victories were seldom as Diesel continued to dominate their house show series. Backlund also faced newcomer Jeff Jarrett at numerous events and was winless. He took a sabbatical and did not compete for several months before returning in May 1994. On the WWF's tour of Japan that month he was defeated by Masashi Aoyagi in Nagoya on May 7, 1994. Backlund rebounded to pin Rick Martel in Sapporo, Japan four days later.

==== Feud with Bret Hart; WWF Champion (1994–1995) ====
The former WWF Champion was now nearly two years into his comeback as the summer of 1994 began and he now found himself slotted as an opening card performer. In that role he defeated The Brooklyn Brawler in multiple house show matches. However, on the July 16, 1994 episode of WWF Superstars he unexpectedly made a challenge to WWF World Heavyweight Champion Bret Hart. It was accepted, and on the July 30, 1994, episode of Superstars, Backlund wrestled what was billed as an "Old Generation vs. New Generation" match against Bret Hart, with Hart's WWF Championship on the line. Over the preceding weeks, the WWF aired vignettes of Backlund training for this match. Hart won the match, capitalizing after Backlund mistakenly believed he had won and helped Hart to his feet. Backlund "snapped" after Hart repeatedly tried to offer a sportsmanlike handshake following the match. He slapped Hart in the face and locked him in the crossface chickenwing submission hold, while screaming hysterically. After finally releasing the hold, Backlund stared at his hands in apparent shock. Backlund then started to regularly "snap" in similar fashion during his matches, viciously attacking his opponent with the crossface chickenwing and refusing to release it after the opponent submitted. He would then seemingly snap back to normal and appear horrified by what he had done.

On the August 1, 1994 episode of Monday Night Raw, which aired shortly after his match with Hart, Backlund cemented his heel turn when he appeared on Jerry Lawler's "King's Court." He claimed that he should still be considered the legitimate WWF Champion, as he had not been pinned by The Iron Sheik, nor submitted to the camel clutch, but at the same time denounced the fans for supporting the "New Generation". Backlund continued wrestling under the new gimmick of an out of touch and highly volatile eccentric, out to teach "The New Generation" a lesson. He dressed in business suits (complete with a bow tie), had a hyperactive personality and used (and often misused, for comic effect) large words during his interviews. He demanded that he be addressed as Mr. Backlund, and he would only sign autographs for wrestling fans if they could recite the names of all of the United States Presidents in chronological order. On several instances, he assaulted wrestlers and other WWF employees and placed them in the crossface chickenwing. These victims include Jim Ross, Duke "The Dumpster" Droese, WWF Magazine writer Lou Gianfriddo, and his former manager Arnold Skaaland, whom he blamed for costing him the WWF World Heavyweight Championship in 1983.

On November 23, 1994, at the Survivor Series pay-per-view in San Antonio, Texas, Backlund faced Bret Hart in a Throw in the Towel match for the WWF Championship where the only way for a wrestler to win was to have the opponent's valet, like Arnold Skaaland did for Backlund over a decade earlier, stop the match by throwing a towel into the ring. Backlund began displaying a white towel that he claimed was the same one that was thrown into the ring the night he lost to The Iron Sheik. To serve as his second for the match, Backlund paired up with Owen Hart, the brother and chief rival of the reigning champion who had tried and failed multiple times that year to wrest the belt from Bret.

Late in the match, as Backlund was locked in Hart's trademark Sharpshooter submission, Owen entered the ring and attacked Bret from behind to cause him to break the hold. Bret's cornerman for the match, Davey Boy Smith, chased Owen around the ring only to collide head first with the ring stairs. When Bret turned around to argue with his brother, Backlund took advantage and locked the crossface chickenwing on the champion. Hart fought the hold for an unprecedented eight-and-a-half minutes, but refused to give up.

Since Smith was unconscious on the floor, he was unable to save Hart. Owen took advantage by picking up the pink and black towel Smith carried and, feigning concern for the well-being of his brother, approached his father Stu and his mother Helen who were seated at ringside. As Backlund continued to cinch in the crossface chickenwing in the ring, Owen pleaded for his parents to stop the match. Stu refused, not trusting Owen's motives. Helen, however, did not want to see Bret risk further injury and she grabbed the towel and threw it into the ring. Backlund was awarded the championship and celebrated in the ring while Owen rejoiced in finally having cost his brother the championship. After the match, Backlund conducted a brief interview which he concluded by screaming how he felt "like God".

Backlund's second reign as WWF Champion was brief, as he lost the title three days later to Diesel at a non-televised show in Madison Square Garden, the site of many of Backlund's victories in the 1970s and 1980s. Diesel kicked Backlund in the stomach, hit him with a Jackknife Powerbomb and pinned him in eight seconds. For weeks afterwards, fans jeered Backlund with chants of "Eight seconds! Eight seconds!". In a 2005 interview for the Pro Wrestling Torch, Diesel recalled how Backlund sold his Jackknife Powerbomb by crawling up the aisleway, back to the dressing room area of the Garden. Nash said, "He couldn't have put me over any stronger". This match was the last time (to date) the WWF Championship changed hands at a non-televised event, and aside from Money in the Bank cash-ins, this match remains the shortest WWF title match ever; in fact, it would be tied by Randy Orton cashing in his Money in the Bank contract on Daniel Bryan at the 2013 SummerSlam, or Brock Lesnar's quick victory against Kofi Kingston at SmackDown's 20th Anniversary in 2019. Backlund faced Diesel in a series of rematches in December 1994 and January 1995, but was unable to regain the title.

==== Presidential campaign (1995–1996) ====
After the title loss, Backlund wrestled progressively less often, never again reaching main event status.

On January 22, 1995, he competed in the 1995 Royal Rumble in Tampa, Florida. This time Backlund was quickly eliminated, being tossed over the top rope in just 16 seconds. On February 19 on the WWF Action Zone he defeated Davey Boy Smith via disqualification when Bret Hart attacked him. On the March 13, episode of Monday Night Raw Backlund battled Intercontinental Champion Jeff Jarrett in a rare heel vs heel match; Backlund won via disqualification after Razor Ramon attacked Jarrett to prevent the title from changing hands and preserving Ramon's scheduled title opportunity at the upcoming WrestleMania. On April 2, 1995, Backlund faced Bret Hart in a "I Quit" match at WrestleMania XI, which Backlund lost, even though he never actually said "I quit", instead screaming unintelligibly into the microphone, which special guest referee Roddy Piper seemed to interpret as "I quit".

Following WrestleMania and the feud with Hart ended, the WWF ran an angle in which Backlund declared his candidacy for President of the United States in advance of the 1996 United States presidential election. Several vignettes aired, featuring Backlund preaching socially conservative values, and one showed him campaigning at a beach. On the May 5, 1995 episode of Monday Night Raw he announced his candidacy. In subsequent weeks Backlund provided numerous policy objectives if becoming president, including the prohibition of rock music. The latter led to a feud with newcomer and musician Man Mountain Rock. Their first match took place on June 10, 1995, in Madison Square Garden; Rock defeated Backlund. On the June 12 episode of Raw he found the guitar of Rock in the backstage area and destroyed it, furthering the feud. Backlund ultimately gained the upper hand in the feud and dominated Man Mountain in matches as the summer of 1995 progressed.

Meanwhile, Backlund continued to make television appearances as the year progressed, "campaigning" for the Presidency of the United States. On September 24, 1995, at In Your House 3 he introduced Dean Douglas for his match with Razor Ramon and proceeded to berate the audience. After a two-month absence from competition he returned to action on October 6, 1995, in Madison Square Garden and was defeated by 1-2-3 Kid. This began a house show series that saw the Kid gain numerous victories over the former WWF Champion, before Backlund finally gained a win at a show in Utica, New York on October 15, 1995. On October 28, 1995, he wrestled his first televised match since WrestleMania XI, defeating Bob Clancy on an episode of WWF Superstars. In November he began another house show program, this time with Bob Holly and was undefeated. Still campaigning for the Presidency, Backlund confronted a Bill Clinton impersonator who was seated at ringside at the 1995 Survivor Series. On the November 27, 1995 episode of Raw, he would again attack Bret Hart.

On the December 2, 1995 episode of WWF Superstars he was interviewed by Jim Ross. Backlund attacked Ross and placed him in the cross-faced chicken wing. Savio Vega made the save, and the two battled to a double countout a week later on Superstars. On the December 11, 1995 episode of Monday Night Raw, he faced WWF World Champion Bret Hart in a non-title match. Hart defeated Backlund via disqualification after the latter applied the cross face chicken wing and refused to release it, with Davey Boy Smith also attacking Hart. Backlund would afterwards mainly compete in house shows. Backlund began a house show feud with Savio Vega but was winless, including a dark match on December 17 at the In Your House V PPV. He concluded the year teaming with BodyDonna Skip in a series of matches against Savio Vega & Fatu.

This transitioned Backlund to a house show series with Fatu, and Backlund began 1996 with multiple defeats to the former Headshrinker. He competed in the Royal Rumble but this time was eliminated by Yokozuna. Shortly after he took another sabbatical before returning on May 18, 1996, to defeat Roy Raymond on WWF Superstars. On May 9, he was defeated by Vega in the first round of the Kuwait Cup in Kuwait City. The two wrestled again at Madison Square Garden on May 19, 1996; Backlund was again defeated. This would be Backlund's final wrestling match of his comeback.

Backlund's appearances began to become sporadic as the year wore on. He returned on July 12, 1996, at the In Your House: International Incident PPV, still campaigning for the Presidency. On the July 22 episode of Monday Night Raw he continued to campaign in the crowd, and on the August 12 episode he joined the commentary team and said that he was bringing someone to the WWF that would be superior to WWF World Champion Shawn Michaels. The angle of Backlund's campaign was quietly dropped before it reached a conclusion.

==== Managing The Sultan (1996–1997) ====
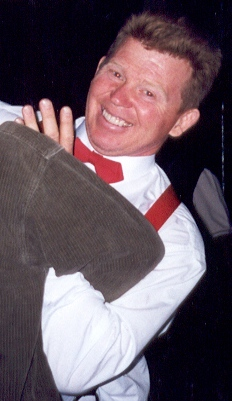
Backlund in September 1998

On September 9, 1996, on Raw Championship Friday, Backlund announced a partnership with his old nemesis, The Iron Sheik to co-manage his new mystery charge. On the September 9 edition of RAW the wrestler was revealed as The Sultan in the WWF. Backlund would accompany the Sultan to various matches for the remainder of 1996.

Backlund continued to guide his protege as 1997 began. On the March 10, 1997 episode of Monday Night Raw, he declared that The Sultan would defeat Rocky Maivia and attain the Intercontinental title at the upcoming WrestleMania 13. Rocky however was victorious at the PPV; after the match The Sultan, The Iron Shiek, and Backlund attacked Miavia until the latter's father Rocky Johnson came to his son's aid. Backlund's final appearance in his second WWF run came at In Your House 14: Revenge of the 'Taker on April 20, 1997, where he managed The Sultan in his win over Flash Funk.

=== Wrestle Association R (1994) ===
In 1994, Backlund while under contract with WWF worked for Genichiro Tenryu's Wrestle Association R in Japan. He won the WAR World Six-Man Tag Team Championship with Scott Putski and former WWF wrestler The Warlord defeating Fuyuki-Gun members Hiromichi Fuyuki, Gedo and Jado on August 26. They dropped the titles back to Fuyuki, Gedo, and Jado a few days later.

=== Independent circuit (1995–1998) ===
In 1995, while still working for the WWF, Backlund started wrestling on the independent circuit. He mainly wrestled for Windy City Wrestling from 1995 to 1998. He lost to Jimmy Snuka on February 27, 1996, at Trans World Wrestling Federation event. After leaving WWF in 1997, Backlund continued in the indies. On November 11, 1998, he lost to Lance Diamond at NWA New Jersey event.

=== Battlarts (1998–1999) ===
From 1998 to 1999, Backlund wrestled for Battlarts in Japan.

=== World Wrestling Federation (1999, 2000) ===
In February 1999, Backlund appeared on an episode of Sunday Night Heat in a skit in which himself, The Iron Sheik, and Dominic Denucci gave comedic advice to Mankind before his WWF Championship match with The Rock at St. Valentine's Day Massacre.

Backlund returned to the WWF in the 2000 Royal Rumble. After that, he briefly managed Intercontinental and European Champion Kurt Angle, and he taught his crossface chickenwing submission hold to Angle. Later on, Angle fired Backlund and locked him in that move, after discovering Backlund had booked him in a two-fall triple threat match against Chris Benoit and Chris Jericho (with both of his titles on the line) at WrestleMania 2000, where he ultimately lost both titles. Backlund teamed with Angle on SmackDown! as they lost to Jericho and Tazz by disqualification on March 16.

=== New Japan Pro-Wrestling (2001) ===
In October 2001 he returned to New Japan Pro-Wrestling teaming with Tatsumi Fujinami for a few matches. He once again retired from wrestling.

=== Total Nonstop Action Wrestling (2007) ===
After many references to Bob Backlund were made by Kevin Nash, he officially debuted in Total Nonstop Action Wrestling (TNA) in January 2007, at the Final Resolution pay-per-view, judging the finals of the Paparazzi Championship Series (PCS) between Alex Shelley and Austin Starr. Given the tie breaking vote, Backlund launched a long explanation before declaring his decision a draw, and the match was restarted by PCS director Kevin Nash. After Shelley won the match, Starr pie-faced Backlund because he believed Backlund had cost him the match, at which Backlund responded by putting Starr in the crossface chickenwing. At Against All Odds after Senshi defeated Austin Starr, Backlund came out and put his own chickenwing on Starr before dragging him to the back.

Backlund then began to make regular appearances on Impact!. During this time, he was described as crazy and weird by commentators Don West and Mike Tenay, somewhat similar to the "Mr. Backlund" gimmick of his second WWF tenure. At Destination X, Backlund was in the corner of Austin Starr who lost to Senshi in a Crossface Chickenwing match. At Lockdown, Backlund was the special guest referee in a Six Sides of Steel match where Senshi defeated Austin Starr.

Backlund made his in-ring return at Slammiversary, where he defeated Alex Shelley. He then teamed with Jerry Lynn to lose to Alex Shelley and Chris Sabin (managed by Kevin Nash) at Victory Road. When TNA redesigned their website, Backlund's profile was removed, signalling the end of his run with the company.

=== Late career (2007–present) ===
On the 15th Anniversary episode of Raw on December 10, 2007, Backlund participated in the 15th Anniversary battle royal, along with 14 other wrestlers from Raw''s 15-year history. Backlund was eliminated from the match by Skinner.

On the July 9, 2012, episode of Raw, after Heath Slater's match with Sin Cara, Slater issued a challenge to any "past champion" as part of a weekly series of Legend appearances. Backlund emerged from backstage to answer this challenge and, as Backlund entertained the crowd, Slater kicked him in the stomach and mocked him; Backlund responded by putting Slater in the crossface chickenwing, which he refused to break for 20 seconds after Slater had tapped out. He later appeared on Raw 1000 with all of the other Legends who had faced Slater over prior weeks, helping Lita chase Slater back into the ring when he tried to run away from Lita and the APA.

Backlund was inducted into the WWE Hall of Fame on April 6, 2013, by his friend Maria Menounos, and was acknowledged onstage with the year's other inductees at WrestleMania 29.

Backlund made an appearance on the October 7, 2013, episode of Raw, unsuccessfully attempting to canvass votes in order to become the special guest referee for the WWE Championship match at Hell in a Cell; Shawn Michaels later won a public vote and was named as the special guest referee. However, Backlund did appear in a segment at Hell in a Cell together with The Prime Time Players, where they played WWE 2K14. Since April 2014, he has served as an ambassador for WWE.

On the May 5, 2016, episode of SmackDown, Backlund was asked by Darren Young to be his life coach, and Backlund agreed, vowing to "Make Darren Young Great Again". Over the next several months, various vignettes featuring Young and Backlund aired, with Backlund assuming the role of Young's life coach. On the July 11 episode of Raw, Young won a battle royal to become the number one contender for the Intercontinental Championship. At Battleground, Young faced The Miz in a match that resulted in a double-countout after he applied the Crossface Chickenwing to Miz outside the ring to protect Backlund from Miz and Maryse. On July 19 at the 2016 WWE draft, Backlund and Young were drafted to Raw. In early 2017, after Young got injured, Backlund ceased appearing on television. On October 29, 2017, Young was released from WWE, ending the storyline. Backlund's profile on WWE.com was then moved to the Hall of Fame page shortly afterwards.

On September 21, 2009, Backlund defeated Jason Rumble at NWA On Fire in Springvale, Maine. He would wrestle for Juggalo Championship Wrestling Legends & Icons event defeating Ken Patera on August 12, 2011.

At 68 years old, Backlund returned to Japan and joined for Dradition Pro Wrestling for two events in 2018. On April 20 he teamed with Riki Choshu and Tatsumi Fujinami to defeat Jinsei Shinzaki, Kazma Sakamoto and Tajiri. The next day he teamed with Hiro Saito and Yoshiaki Fujiwara as they lost to Fujinami, Choshu, and Masakatsu Funaki.

== Legacy ==
Backlund is viewed as one of the best wrestlers of his era, in 2011 Bleacher Report ranked him #38 on their list of the greatest wrestlers of all time noting: that he was "the last real hero before the Hulk Hogan Era in the WWF" and "he was also one of the last great technical wrestlers in the WWF." Another part of Backland's legacy is his 2,135 day WWWF/WWF Championship reign which is recognized as the second longest in the championship's history only behind Bruno Sanmmartino's 2,803 day reign. In addition Backlund was known for his technical wrestling prowess, "being credited for breaking the ground for more technically skilled wrestlers." Matthew Hester of Bleacher Report stated that without Backlund "we may have never seen champs like HBK, Bret Hart or Jeff Hardy."

== Books ==
Backlund's autobiography, The All-American Boy: Lessons and Stories on Life from Wrestling Legend Bob Backlund, was released on September 18, 2015. The 452-page book, contributed to by Robert H. Miller, includes interviews with Roddy Piper, Ric Flair, The Iron Sheik and Vince McMahon.

== Acting career ==
Backlund was a guest on MTV's Singled Out, where he acted in sketches with hosts Jenny McCarthy and Chris Hardwick. He played the role of Friar Chuck, alongside Maria Menounos and John Waters, in the feature film comedy In the Land of Merry Misfits. The film played at the 2007 Tribeca Film Festival, where Backlund appeared and signed autographs.

== Other media ==
=== Video games ===
Video game appearances
Year	Title	Notes
2002	Legends of Wrestling II	Video game debut
2004	Showdown: Legends of Wrestling	
2014	WWE SuperCard	Mobile game

== Personal life ==
Backlund and his wife, high school physical education teacher Corki, have a daughter named Carrie. They sold their home in Glastonbury, Connecticut and moved to Florida in the spring of 2023. In 2000, he unsuccessfully ran for a Connecticut seat in Congress on a Republican ticket.

== Championships and accomplishments ==
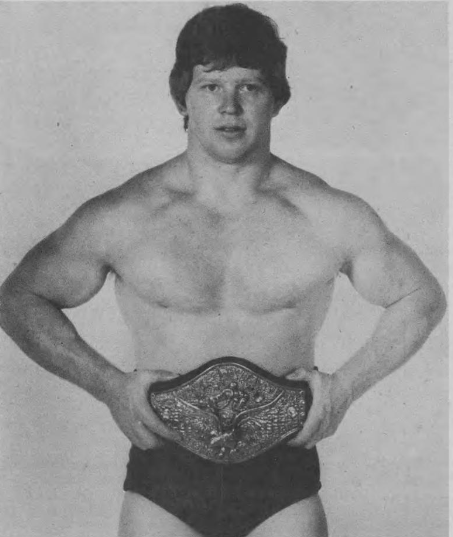
Backlund as WWF Heavyweight Champion, c. 1982

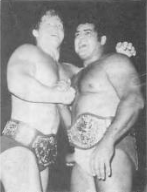
Backlund and Pedro Morales as WWF Tag Team Champions in 1980

- Championship Wrestling from Florida
  - NWA Florida Tag Team Championship (1 time) – with Steve Keirn
- George Tragos/Lou Thesz Professional Wrestling Hall of Fame
  - Class of 2016
- Georgia Championship Wrestling
  - NWA Georgia Tag Team Championship (1 time) – with Jerry Brisco
- International Professional Wrestling Hall of Fame
  - Class of 2023
- New Japan Pro-Wrestling
  - MSG Tag League (1980) – with Antonio Inoki
  - Greatest 18 Club inductee
- Northeast Wrestling Federation
  - NEWF Heavyweight Championship (1 time) 2004)
- North Dakota State University Athletic Hall of Fame
  - (Class of 1983)
- Pro Wrestling Illustrated
  - Match of the Year (1978) vs. Superstar Billy Graham on February 20
  - Match of the Year (1982) vs. Jimmy Snuka in a steel cage match on June 28
  - Most Hated Wrestler of the Year (1994)
  - Most Inspirational Wrestler of the Year (1977, 1981)
  - Rookie of the Year (1976)
  - Wrestler of the Year (1980, 1982)
  - Ranked No. 7 of the 500 best singles wrestlers of the PWI Years in 2003
- Professional Wrestling Hall of Fame and Museum
  - Modern Era (Class of 2008)
- St. Louis Wrestling Club
  - NWA Missouri Heavyweight Championship (1 time)
- Waldorf University Athletic Hall of Fame
  - (Class of 2015)
- Western States Sports
  - NWA Western States Heavyweight Championship (3 times)
- World Wide Wrestling Federation/World Wrestling Federation/WWE
  - WWWF/WWF (World) Heavyweight Championship (2 times)
  - WWF Tag Team Championship (1 time) – with Pedro Morales
  - Slammy Award (1 time)
    - Most Eccentric (1994)
  - WWE Hall of Fame (Class of 2013)
- Wrestling and Romance
  - WAR World Six-Man Tag Team Championship (1 time) – with Scott Putski and The Warlord
- Wrestling Observer Newsletter
  - Best Technical Wrestler (1980)
  - Match of the Year (1980) vs. Ken Patera in a Texas Death match on May 19 in New York City, New York
  - Most Disgusting Promotional Tactic (1982) Being WWF Champion
  - Most Overrated Wrestler (1983)
  - Wrestling Observer Newsletter Hall of Fame (Class of 2004)
