= Obe Blanc =

American wrestler and coach

Personal information
- Born: May 17, 1985 (age 41) Jean-Rabel, Haiti
- Home town: Naples, Florida, U.S.
- Weight: 125.6 lb (57 kg)

Sport
- Country: United States
- Sport: Wrestling
- Events: Freestyle and Folkstyle
- College team: Oklahoma State; Lock Haven
- Team: USA
Medal record
Men's freestyle wrestling
Representing the United States
Pan American Games
Silver medal – second place	2011 Guadalajara	55 kg
Pan American Championships
Silver medal – second place	2009 Maracaibo	55 kg
Silver medal – second place	2010 Monterrey	55 kg
Waclaw Ziolkowski Memorial
Gold medal – first place	2012 Siedlce	55 kg

Obe Blanc (born May 17, 1985) is an American wrestler and coach. He competed at 57 kg in freestyle wrestling at the World Championships for the United States in 2010. Blanc was named head coach of the North Dakota State Bison wrestling team in 2023.

== Biography ==
=== High School ===
Blanc wrestled for Lely High School in Naples, Florida during his high school career. He was a Florida 2A wrestling state champion, and was ranked sixth in the nation by Amateur Wrestling News during his senior season.

=== College ===
After high school, Blanc attended Lock Haven University, where he placed sixth at 125 pounds at the 2007 NCAA Wrestling National Championships, earning him All-American honors. He finished his collegiate career at Oklahoma State, where he was one win shy of All-American honors at the 2009 NCAA Wrestling National Championships.

=== Senior level ===
Internationally, Blanc finished first at the United States World Team Trials in 2010, and finished 9th at the 2010 World Wrestling Championships. Other notable finishes in tournaments include a silver medal in the 2011 Pan American Games, University Nationals silver medal, and 2013 United States World Team Trials champion. Blanc was also an alternate for the 2012 Summer Olympics.

== Major results ==
Year	Tournament	Location	Result	Event
2009	Pan American Championships	Maracaibo, Venezuela	2nd	Freestyle 55 kg
2010	Pan American Championships	Monterrey, Mexico	2nd	Freestyle 55 kg
2010	World Championships	Moscow, Russia	9th	Freestyle 55 kg
2011	Waclaw Ziolkowski Memorial	Poznan, Poland	11th	Freestyle 55 kg
2011	Pan American Games	Guadalajara, Mexico	2nd	Freestyle 55 kg
2012	Yasar Dogu Tournament	Ankara, Turkey	17th	Freestyle 55 kg
2012	Waclaw Ziolkowski Memorial	Siedlce, Poland	1st	Freestyle 55 kg
2013	World Cup	Tehran, Iran	5th	Freestyle 55 kg
