= Western Wrestling Conference =

- Association: NCAA
- Founded: April 27, 2006
- Folded: July 29, 2015
- Sports fielded: Men's wrestling
- Division: Division I
- No. of teams: 6
- Headquarters: Orem, Utah
- Region: Midwestern United States, Western United States

The Western Wrestling Conference (WWC) was an NCAA Division I wrestling-only conference that competed from 2006 through 2015. All of its past members became associate members of the Big 12 Conference, and all but one continue to compete in Big 12 wrestling. The exception is Fresno State, which was a charter WWC member but dropped the sport before conference competition started, revived the sport in 2017 as a Big 12 associate member, and dropped wrestling again after the 2020–21 season.

== History ==
The conference was formed on April 27, 2006, by eight schools with wrestling squads that had formerly competed as independents since the WWC charter members were all members of conferences that did not sponsor wrestling except one true independent. The original members were the United States Air Force Academy and the University of Wyoming of the Mountain West Conference, California State University, Fresno (more commonly known as Fresno State) of the Western Athletic Conference, North Dakota State University and South Dakota State University of the Summit League, the University of Northern Colorado of the Big Sky Conference, the University of Northern Iowa of the Missouri Valley Conference, and independent Utah Valley University (then named Utah Valley State College).

Fresno State dropped its wrestling program before competing in the conference.

On October 22, 2006, the conference logo, designed by Flint Communications of Fargo, North Dakota, was introduced.

The conference began competition in the 2006–07 school year.

In 2012, Northern Iowa became an associate member of the Mid-American Conference, reducing the WWC membership to six.

Lacking the required minimum of seven member schools, the NCAA did not recognize the conference and required the WWC schools athletes to qualify for the NCAA Division I Wrestling Championships through the Western Regional Tournament — a tournament which included only the six WCC schools and also served as the de facto conference championship .

The Big 12 Conference had been wrestling with only four teams since Nebraska moved to the Big Ten in 2011, but the NCAA had annually granted a waiver for its conference championships to be recognized and its champions and runners-up to be granted automatic qualification to the national championships. In 2015, the NCAA declined to grant the waiver, and the Big 12 Conference coaches declined to have their athletes wrestle in the Western Regional Tournament. As a result, Big 12 wrestlers advanced to the NCAA Championships only as at-large invitees. At that time, talk began about the Big 12 inviting the Western Wrestling Conference teams to become affiliate members of the Big 12.

On July 29, 2015, the Big 12 Conference and the six member schools of the WWC announced that Air Force, North Dakota State, Northern Colorado, South Dakota State, Utah Valley, and Wyoming were being added to the Big 12's wrestling competition as affiliates, joining Big 12 full-member schools Iowa State, Oklahoma, Oklahoma State, and West Virginia to make a 10-team conference. While expanding the competition by 150%, the Big 12 ended its tradition (carried over from the prior Big Eight Conference) of holding the championships at campus sites, holding the 2016 Big 12 Wrestling Championships at the Sprint Center (now T-Mobile Center) in Kansas City, Missouri.

The WWC's absorption by the Big 12 was completed in 2017 when the Big 12 added Northern Iowa and the resurrected Fresno State wrestling program as associate members.

== Final Members ==
- Air Force Falcons (2007–2015)
- North Dakota State Bison (2007–2015)
- Northern Colorado Bears (2007–2015)
- South Dakota State Jackrabbits (2007–2015)
- Utah Valley Wolverines (2007–2015)
- Wyoming Cowboys (2007–2015)

== Former members ==
- Fresno State Bulldogs (never competed, dropped program) – program revived in 2017 in the Big 12, but dropped again in 2021
- Northern Iowa Panthers (2007–2012) - moved to Mid-American Conference, now in the Big 12

== Team dual meet champions ==
Year	Champion	Record	Ref
2007	Northern Iowa	4–0	
2008	Northern Iowa	4–0	
2009	Wyoming	5–0	
2010	Wyoming	6–0	
2011	Northern Iowa	5–0	
2012	Wyoming	6–0	
2013	North Dakota State	5–0	
2014	North Dakota State; Wyoming	4–1	
2015	North Dakota State	5–0	

== Team tournament champions ==
The NCAA West Regional served as the conference tournament.

Year	Champion	Points	Ref
2007	Northern Iowa	96.0	
2008	Northern Iowa	119.0	
2009	Northern Iowa	94.0	
2010	Wyoming	75.0	
2011	Wyoming	93.0	
2012	Wyoming	93.5	
2013	Wyoming	79.0	
2014	North Dakota State	74.0	
2015	North Dakota State	70.5	
