= Arthur Maughan =

American wrestler and coach (1940–1941)

Arthur "Bucky" Maughan (1940/1941 – October 15, 2024) was an American wrestler. He was a distinguished member of the National Wrestling Hall of Fame and head coach of the wrestling team at North Dakota State University in Fargo, North Dakota, where he was head coach from 1964.

Maughan coached four national championship teams: in 1988, 1998, 2000 and 2001. During his collegiate career, he won three national wrestling titles. He was the NCAA champion at 115 pounds in 1963 for Moorhead State University and also won the NAIA 123 pound championship in 1962 and 1963.

On May 17, 2011, Maughan announced his retirement. He died on October 15, 2024, at the age of 83.
