= Roger Kish =

American wrestler and wrestling coach

Current position
- Title: Head coach
- Team: Oklahoma
- Conference: Big 12
- Record: 0–0

Biographical details
- Born: Lapeer, Michigan, U.S.

Playing career
- 2004–2008: Minnesota

Coaching career (HC unless noted)
- 2008–2009: Minnesota (assistant)
- 2009–2011: North Dakota State (assistant)
- 2011–2023: North Dakota State
- 2023–present: Oklahoma

Roger Kish is an American wrestler and the current head coach of the Oklahoma Sooners wrestling team. A native of Lapeer, Michigan, Kish was a four-time Michigan state wrestling champion. Kish is currently tied for ninth all time on the Michigan high school single season win record list. He is second all time on the MHSAA career wins compiling a record of 252-2. Kish went on to become only the 11th four-time champion in MHSAA history. His performance in 2003 earned him the Junior Schalles Award for top high school pinner. He next wrestled at the University of Minnesota, compiling a career record of 117-27. As a sophomore and a junior in college, he finished 2nd at the national tournament. After leaving the University of Minnesota, Kish became an assistant wrestling coach at North Dakota State University. He was hired as the head coach at North Dakota State in 2011 and became the youngest NCAA Division I head coach in any sport.

Prior to Oklahoma, Kish was the head coach of the North Dakota State Bison wrestling program from 2012 to 2023, just a few years after NDSU became eligible for Division I competition. During his tenure, six wrestlers earned All-American status.
