= North Dakota State Bison wrestling =

Wrestling team of North Dakota State University

- University: North Dakota State University
- Head coach: Obe Blanc (3rd season)
- Conference: Pac-12
- Location: Fargo, ND
- Arena: Scheels Center (capacity: 5,460)
- Nickname: Bison

Team national championships
- NCAA Division II; 4

National championship years
- NCAA Division II; 1988, 1998, 2000, 2001

Conference championships
- Western Wrestling Conference; 2014, 2015

Conference Tournament championships
- North Central Conference; 1979, 1982, 1983, 1984, 1985, 1986, 1987, 1988, 1989, 1990, 1992, 1993, 1994, 1998, 2001, 2002, 2004

The North Dakota State Bison wrestling team represents North Dakota State University in Fargo, North Dakota. The Bison compete in the Pac-12 Conference (NDSU's primary conference, the Summit League, does not have wrestling) and wrestle their home duals at the Scheels Center. NDSU is currently coached by Obe Blanc.

== History ==
North Dakota State wrestling began in 1957 when head coach Tom Neuberger led the team to victory in their first dual meet against Valley City State University. Neuberger passed the coaching reins to Bucky Maughan in 1964. Since that time, NDSU has won four NCAA Division II wrestling titles, 30 individual national champions, and 159 All-Americans. The first individual National Champions were Bob Backlund and Bill Demaray in 1971. The team has since transitioned to NCAA Division I and emerged from reclassification in 2007.

The Bison have had only three permanent head wrestling coaches in their history. Tom Nueberger coached the team from 1957-1963. During that time, Don Lemnus served as acting coach in 1961. In 1964 National Wrestling Hall of Fame member Bucky Maughan took over the program and led the team through four Division II team titles and NDSU's transition to Division I. On May 17, 2011 Bucky Maughan announced his retirement. His replacement would eventually be Roger Kish, who was a two-time NCAA runner-up at the University of Minnesota. Kish left after 12 years in 2023 and was replaced by Obe Blanc, an All-American wrestler for Lock Haven University and former assistant at North Carolina State University and NDSU.

In 2013-14, the Bison wrestling team had its best season to date as a Division I school. The team reached its highest ranking of 20th in the USA Today polls and finished 21st in the national championship. Steven Monk finished third at the NCAA championships at 165 pounds. Monk was the eighth Bison wrestler to earn All-American status and the second since the school completed its transition to Division I, after Trent Sprenkle, who finished fifth at the 125 pound weight class in 2013. In 2015, Hayden Zillmer (6th at 184) and Kurtis Julson (8th at 174) were the only two WWC athletes to earn All-America honors. After the season, it was announced that NDSU and other WWC schools would merge with the Big 12 Conference.

In 2020, the season was shortened due to the COVID-19 pandemic, and All-Americans were named without the basis of the NCAA tournament. Three Bison were named All-Americans that year including: Cam Sykora (133), Jared Franek (157), and Andrew Fogarty (165).

In 2022-23, the Bison wrestling team had an all-time great season as a Division I school. NDSU reached its highest ranking ever of 15th in the USA Today polls and finished 18th in the national championship. The Bison brought a total of six wrestlers to the national tournament, which ties a program Division I record (weight, rank): Jared Franek (157, No. 4), Michael Caliendo (165, No. 7), Kellyn March (149, No. 13), Owen Pentz (197, No. 16), DJ Parker (184, No. 29), McGwire Midkiff (133, No. 32). Jared Franek's tournament rank of 4th in his weight class ties a program Division I record set by Steven Monk in 2014. Jared Franek would wind up winning the Elite 90 award for wrestling, and would finish fourth at the tournament, officially naming him an All-American. Michael Caliendo finished seventh in his weight class, also earning the All-American title. The other four Bison wrestlers were eliminated before the blood round. After the season finished, Roger Kish left the program to become the head coach at Oklahoma. Obe Blanc was named as his replacement on May 5, 2023. Blanc rises from associate head coach, the position he had held with the Bison for the past two seasons.

On April 1, 2026, North Dakota State announced that the team would be moving to the Pac-12 Conference starting on July 1, 2026.

== Home meets ==
Home meets are currently held at the Scheels Center. The new arena was completed in 2016 after a $50 million renovation of the old Bison Sports Arena. The Bison hosted the Division II wrestling tournament three times in the Bison Sports Arena. Prior to that arena opening in 1970, NDSU competed in the Bentson Bunker Fieldhouse on campus.

== Coaches ==
#	Name	Years	Dual Record	Conference Titles	NCAA Titles
1	Tom Neuberger	1957–61, 1962–64	27–52–4	0	0
2	Don Lemnus	1961–62	4–8–1	0	0
3	Bucky Maughan	1964–2011	467–157–13	17	4
4	Roger Kish	2011–2023	108–70–0	2	0
5	Obe Blanc	2023–present	3–11	0	0
Overall		1957–present	609–298–18	19	4

== Championships ==
NCAA Division II team titles: 1988, 1998, 2000, 2001

North Central Conference Division II team titles: 1979, 1982, 1983, 1984, 1985, 1986, 1987, 1988, 1989, 1990, 1991, 1992, 1993, 1994, 1998, 2001, 2002, 2004

Western Wrestling Conference team titles: (Division I): 2013, 2014, 2015

== All-Americans ==
The following are a list of Bison All-Americans determined by winning a certain number of matches in the NCAA Division I Wrestling Championships.

Division I

- Trent Sprenkle, 125 (2013, 5th)
- Steven Monk, 165 (2014, 3rd)
- Kurtis Julson, 174 (2015, 8th)
- Hayden Zillmer, 184 (2015, 6th)
- Cam Sykora, 133 (2020^, 2nd)
- Jared Franek, 157 (2020^, HM)
- Andrew Fogarty, 165 (2020^, HM)
- Jared Franek, 157 (2023, 4th)
- Michael Caliendo, 165 (2023, 7th)
- Gavin Drexler, 149 (2025, 8th)

^ - Due to the COVID-19 pandemic, the NCAA tournament did not happen in 2020, so the NWCA recognized All-Americans based on body of work and conference tournament results

== Elite 90 Award ==
The following wrestler(s) were named as the NCAA's Elite 90 award winner in Wrestling for that academic year.

- Jared Franek (2022, 2023)
