= United Soccer Conference =

NCAA Division I conference

Official logo of United Soccer Conference

The United Soccer Conference was an NCAA Division I conference founded in 2005 whose members competed in the sport of women's soccer. On February 10, 2007, New Jersey Institute of Technology joined the conference, however later that year on July 1, 2007, Indiana Purdue-Fort Wayne, North Dakota State, and South Dakota State left the conference and joined The Summit League. On February 12, 2009, it was announced that the Great West Conference would add Delaware State, Howard, and South Carolina State as associate members to compete in a soccer conference with Houston Baptist, NJIT, North Dakota, South Dakota, and Utah Valley beginning with the 2009–2010 school year. This left Longwood to compete as an independent for the 2009–10 school year, and caused the United Soccer Conference to fold.

Charter members of the conference were Delaware State, Howard, IPFW, Longwood, South Carolina State, and Utah Valley

== Former members ==
Institution	Team	Joined	Left	Current women's soccer conference
Delaware State University	Hornets	2005	2009	Independent
Howard University	Lady Bison	2005	2009	Southwestern Athletic Conference
Indiana University – Purdue University Fort Wayne (Note: IPFW split into two separate institutions on July 1, 2018. The school's athletic program was inherited by Purdue University Fort Wayne, the larger of the two new institutions, and rebranded at that time as "Purdue Fort Wayne".)	Mastodons	2005	2006	Summit League
Longwood University	Lancers	2005	2009	Big South Conference
New Jersey Institute of Technology	Highlanders	2007	2009	ASUN Conference
North Dakota State University	Bison	2006	2006	Summit League
South Carolina State University	Lady Bulldogs	2005	2009	Independent
South Dakota State University	Jackrabbits	2006	2006	Summit League
Utah Valley University	Wolverines	2005	2009	Western Athletic Conference

== Conference Champions ==
Season	Conference Champion
2005	IPFW
2006	South Dakota State
2007	Utah Valley State
