= NCAA Division II Wrestling Championships =

College wrestling tournament

- Association: NCAA
- Sport: College wrestling
- Founded: 1963; 63 years ago
- Division: Division II
- No. of teams: 42 of 59 (2015)
- Country: United States
- Most recent champion: Nebraska–Kearney(6th)
- Most titles: Central Oklahoma (9)
- Website: NCAA.com

The NCAA Division II Wrestling Championships for individuals and teams were first officially sponsored in 1963 and have since been held annually.

The NCAA Division II Wrestling Championships is a double-elimination tournament for individuals competing in ten weight classes. Sixteen wrestlers in each class qualify through four "Super Regional" tournaments. During the championships, individual match winners earn points based on the level and quality of the victory, which are totaled to determine the team championship standings.

In addition to determining the national championship, the NCAA Division II Wrestling Championships also determine the Division II All-America team. The top eight finishers in each weight class qualify for Division II All-American status.

On March 13, 2020, the NCAA cancelled all of its 2020 wrestling championships due to the COVID-19 pandemic.

== Team champions ==
- Prior to 1963, only a single national championship was held for all members of the NCAA; Division II competition began in 1963, with Division III following in 1974.
- Names used are those current in the years listed.

Year	Host city (Host institution)	Team championship				Most Outstanding Wrestler (Team) (Weight)
Year	Host city (Host institution)	Winner	Points	Runner-up	Points	Most Outstanding Wrestler (Team) (Weight)
1963	Cedar Falls, IA (State College of Iowa)	Western State (CO) ^{(1)}	62	Southern Illinois	57	Not awarded
1964	Cedar Falls, IA (State College of Iowa)	Western State (CO) ^{(2)}	51	Colorado School of Mines	49	Not awarded
1965	Golden, CO (Colorado School of Mines)	Mankato State ^{(1)}	57	Cal Poly	54	Not awarded
1966	Mankato, MN (Mankato State College)	Cal Poly ^{(1)}	55	Wilkes	51	Warren Crow (Albany) (123)
1967	Wilkes-Barre, PA (Wilkes College)	Portland State ^{(1)}	86	Mankato State	57	Rich Sanders (Portland State) (115)
1968	Mankato, MN (Mankato State College)	Cal Poly ^{(2)}	91	Portland State	62	Rich Sanders (Portland State) (123)
1969	San Luis Obispo, CA (California State Polytechnic College)	Cal Poly ^{(3)}	127	Colorado State College	81	Carl Ragland (Old Dominion) (152)
1970	Ashland, OH (Ashland College)	Cal Poly ^{(4)}	82	Northern Iowa	58	Terry Hall (Cal Poly) (118)
1971	Fargo, ND (North Dakota State University)	Cal Poly ^{(5)}	118	Slippery Rock State	58	Stan Dziedzic (Slippery Rock State) (150)
1972	Oswego, NY (State University of New York at Oswego)	Cal Poly ^{(6)}	94	North Dakota State; Northern Iowa	65 1/2	Wade Schalles (Clarion State) (150)
1973	Brookings, SD (South Dakota State University)	Cal Poly ^{(7)}	108	Clarion State	80	Larry Morgan (Cal Poly) (134)
1974	Fullerton, CA (California State University, Fullerton)	Cal Poly ^{(8)}	112	Northern Iowa	95 1/2	Floyd Hitchcock (Bloomsburg State) (177)
1975	East Stroudsburg, PA (East Stroudsburg State College)	Northern Iowa ^{(1)}	124	SIU Edwardsville	71 1/2	Randy Batten (Chattanooga) (118)
1976	Fargo, ND (North Dakota State University)	Cal State Bakersfield ^{(1)}	92 1/2	Chattanooga	88 1/4	Rick Jensen (South Dakota State) (126)
1977	Cedar Falls, IA (University of Northern Iowa)	Cal State Bakersfield ^{(2)}	107 1/4	Augustana (SD)	78	Franc Affentranger (Cal State Bakersfield) (134)
1978	Cedar Falls, IA (University of Northern Iowa)	Northern Iowa ^{(2)}	124	Cal State Bakersfield	100 1/2	John Azevedo (Cal State Bakersfield) {118)
1979	Brookings, SD (South Dakota State University)	Cal State Bakersfield ^{(3)}	112 3/4	Eastern Illinois	112 1/2	Joe Gonzales (Cal State Bakersfield) {118)
1980	Omaha, NE (University of Nebraska Omaha)	Cal State Bakersfield ^{(4)}	110 1/2	Northern Iowa	89	Brian Parlet (Augustana (SD)) (177)
1981	Davis, CA (University of California, Davis)	Cal State Bakersfield ^{(5)}	144 1/2	Eastern Illinois	98	Dan Cuestas (Cal State Bakersfield) (126)
1982	Kenosha, WI (University of Wisconsin–Parkside)	Cal State Bakersfield ^{(6)}	166 1/2	North Dakota State	78 3/4	Mike Langlais (North Dakota State) (142)
1983	Fargo, ND (North Dakota State University)	Cal State Bakersfield ^{(7)}	107 1/2	North Dakota State	103 3/4	Jessie Reyes (Cal State Bakersfield) (142)
1984	Baltimore, MD (Morgan State University)	SIU Edwardsville ^{(1)}	141 1/2	Cal State Bakersfield	93	John Davis (Morgan State) (158)
1985	Fairborn, OH (Wright State University)	SIU Edwardsville ^{(2)}	132 3/4	Nebraska–Omaha	84 1/4	Koln Knight (Augustana College (SD)) (190)
1986	Edwardsville, IL (Southern Illinois University Edwardsville)	SIU Edwardsville ^{(3)}	119	Edinboro	106 1/2	Koln Knight (Augustana (SD)) (190)
1987	Edwardsville, IL (Southern Illinois University at Edwardsville)	Cal State Bakersfield ^{(8)}	90 1/2	SIU Edwardsville	69 1/2	Daryl Pope (Cal State Bakersfield) (184)
1988	Omaha, NE (University of Nebraska Omaha)	North Dakota State ^{(1)}	88	Nebraska–Omaha	81 3/4	Carlton Haselrig (Pittsburgh–Johnstown) (Hwt.)
1989	California, PA (California University of Pennsylvania)	Portland State ^{(2)}	102 1 /2	Ferris State	56 1/4	Dan Russell (Portland State) (150)
1990	Kenosha, WI (University of Wisconsin–Parkside)	Portland State ^{(3)}	100 3/4	Central State (OK)	96	Dan Russell (Portland State) (158)
1991	Fargo, ND (North Dakota State University)	Nebraska–Omaha ^{(1)}	79 1/2	Central State (OK)	64	Dan Russell {Portland State) (167)
1992	Greeley, CO (University of Northern Colorado)	Central Oklahoma ^{(1)}	91 1/2	North Dakota State; Portland State	78 1/2	Mike Leberknight (Northern Colorado) (177)
1993	Brookings, SD (South Dakota State University)	Central Oklahoma ^{(2)}	108 1/2	Nebraska–Omaha	68	Glen Frank (Colorado School of Mines) (134)
1994	Pueblo, CO (University of Southern Colorado)	Central Oklahoma ^{(3)}	127 1/4	Mankato State	67 1/2	Brian Melchiori (Central Oklahoma) (126)
1995	Kearney, NE (University of Nebraska at Kearney)	Central Oklahoma ^{(4)}	148	Nebraska–Omaha	103	Brian Kapusta (North Dakota State) (118)
1996	Greeley, CO (University of Northern Colorado)	Pittsburgh–Johnstown ^{(1)}	86 1/2	Central Oklahoma	81 1/2	Chad Lamer (South Dakota State) (190)
1997	Fargo, ND (North Dakota State University)	San Francisco State ^{(1)}	95	Nebraska–Omaha	81	Nate Hendrickson (Moorhead State) (167)
1998	Pueblo, CO (University of Southern Colorado)	North Dakota State ^{(2)}	112	South Dakota State	78	Travis King (South Dakota State) (150)
1999	Omaha, NE (University of Nebraska Omaha)	Pittsburgh–Johnstown ^{(2)}	110	Nebraska–Omaha	105 1/2	Jody Strittmatter (Pittsburgh–Johnstown) (125)
2000	Brookings, SD (South Dakota State University)	North Dakota State ^{(3)}	91 1/2	Central Oklahoma	75	Kris Nelson (North Dakota State) (133)
2001	Greeley, CO (University of Northern Colorado)	North Dakota State ^{(4)}	98 1/2	South Dakota State	91	Steve Saxlund (North Dakota State) (184)
2002	Kenosha, WI (University of Wisconsin–Parkside)	Central Oklahoma ^{(5)}	128	North Dakota State	116 1/2	Todd Fuller (North Dakota State) (174)
2003	Wheeling, WV (West Liberty State College)	Central Oklahoma ^{(6)}	87 1/2	Nebraska–Kearney	73 1/2	Cole Province (Central Oklahoma) (133)
2004	Mankato, MN (Minnesota State University, Mankato)	Nebraska–Omaha ^{(2)}	97 1/2	North Dakota State	95	Waylon Lowe (Findlay) (165)
2005	Omaha, NE (University of Nebraska Omaha)	Nebraska–Omaha ^{(3)}	109 1/2	Augustana (SD)	101	Tom Meester (Augustana (SD)) (184)
2006	Findlay, OH (University of Findlay)	Nebraska–Omaha ^{(4)}	117	Nebraska–Kearney	98 1/2	Les Sigman (Nebraska–Omaha) (Hwt.)
2007	Kearney, NE (University of Nebraska at Kearney)	Central Oklahoma ^{(7)}	124 1/2	Nebraska–Kearney	108 1/2	J.D. Naig (Nebraska–Omaha) (174)
2008	Cedar Rapids, IA (Upper Iowa University)	Nebraska–Kearney ^{(1)}	108 1/2	Minnesota State	108	Cody Garcia (Nebraska–Omaha) (125)
2009	Houston, TX (NCAA Division II)	Nebraska–Omaha ^{(5)}	146 1/2	Newberry	80 1/2	Joe Kemmerer (Kutztown) (133)
2010	Omaha, NE (University of Nebraska Omaha)	Nebraska–Omaha ^{(6)}	131	Augustana (SD)	72	Shane Valko (Pittsburgh–Johnstown) (133)
2011	Kearney, NE (University of Nebraska at Kearney)	Nebraska–Omaha ^{(7)}	102 1/2	St. Cloud State	90 1/2	Donovan McMahill (Western State (CO)) (197)
2012	Pueblo, CO (Colorado State University Pueblo)	Nebraska–Kearney ^{(2)}	107	St. Cloud State	95	Luke McPeek (Adams State) (197)
2013	Birmingham, AL (NCAA Division II)	Nebraska–Kearney ^{(3)}	108	St. Cloud State	105	Shamus O’Grady (St. Cloud State) (184)
2014	Cleveland, OH (NCAA Division II)	Notre Dame (OH) ^{(1)}	99 1/2	Nebraska–Kearney	64 1/2	Casy Rowell (Central Oklahoma) (133)
2015	St. Louis, MO (Maryville University)	St. Cloud State ^{(1)}	84 1/2	Nebraska–Kearney	76 1/2	Chris Watson (Central Oklahoma) (165)
2016	Sioux Falls, SD (Northern Sun Intercollegiate Conference & Sioux Falls Sports Authority)	St. Cloud State ^{(2)}	90	Notre Dame (OH)	82	Joey Davis (Notre Dame (OH)) (184)
2017	Birmingham, AL (University of Alabama in Huntsville)	Notre Dame (OH) ^{(2)}	103.5	St. Cloud State	67	DeAndre’ Johnson (Limestone) (157),
2018	Cedar Rapids, IA (Upper Iowa University)	St. Cloud State ^{(3)}	92.5	Notre Dame (OH)	84	Nick Becker (Wisconsin–Parkside) (174)
2019	Cleveland, OH (NCAA Division II)	St. Cloud State ^{(4)}	95.5	Wheeling Jesuit	87.5	Shane Ruhnke (Millersville) (165)
2020	Cancelled due to the COVID-19 pandemic					
2021	St. Louis, MO (NCAA Division II)	St. Cloud State ^{(5)}	107	Nebraska–Kearney	105.5	Lukas Martin (Fairmont State) (149)
2022	St. Louis, MO (NCAA Division II)	Nebraska–Kearney ^{(4)}	127	Central Oklahoma	86	Darrell Mason (Minnesota State) (285)
2023	Cedar Rapids, IA (NCAA Division II)	Central Oklahoma ^{(8)}	121	Lander	78	Josiah Rider (Adams State) (149)
2024	Wichita, KS (NCAA Division II)	Central Oklahoma ^{(9)}	110	Lander	86.5	Derek Blubaugh (Indianapolis) (197)
2025	Indianapolis, IN (University of Indianapolis & Indiana Sports Corp)	Nebraska–Kearney ^{(5)}	115	Augustana (SD)	63	
2026	Sioux Falls, SD	Nebraska–Kearney ^{(6)}	83	Parkside	78	

Note: Shaded scores = Closest margin of victory, 1/4 point in 1979 & widest margin of victory, 88 1/4 points in 1982.

== Team titles ==
- List updated through the 2026 Championships

Team	#	Winning years
Central Oklahoma	9	1992, 1993, 1994, 1995, 2002, 2003, 2007, 2023, 2024
Cal Poly–San Luis Obispo	8	1966, 1968, 1969, 1970, 1971, 1972, 1973, 1974
Cal State Bakersfield	8	1976, 1977, 1979, 1980, 1981, 1982, 1983, 1987
Nebraska–Omaha	7	1991, 2004, 2005, 2006, 2009, 2010, 2011
Nebraska–Kearney	6	2008, 2012, 2013, 2022, 2025, 2026
St. Cloud State	5	2015, 2016, 2018, 2019, 2021
North Dakota State	4	1988, 1998, 2000, 2001
Portland State	3	1967, 1989, 1990
SIU Edwardsville	3	1984, 1985, 1986
Northern Iowa	2	1975, 1978
Notre Dame (OH)	2	2014, 2017
Pitt–Johnstown	2	1996, 1999
Western Colorado	2	1963, 1964
Minnesota State	1	1965
San Francisco State	1	1997

=== Winning streaks ===
School	Team titles	Years
Cal Poly–San Luis Obispo	7	1968–1974
Cal State Bakersfield	5	1979–1983
Central Oklahoma	4	1992–1995
SIU Edwardsville	3	1984–1986
Nebraska–Omaha	3	2004–2006
Nebraska–Omaha	3	2009–2011

== Division II wrestlers to Division I championships ==
Through 1989, the Division II finalists advanced to the Division I championships, held the following week, where many athletes earned All-American recognition in two divisions during the same season. This practice was discontinued after Carlton Haselrig of the Pittsburgh–Johnstown Mountain Cats won the Division II heavyweight title and advanced to Division I, where he also won the heavyweight title three years in a row, 1987–89.

== Former Division II team champions now in Division I ==
School	Championships	Year moved	Current wrestling conference (as of 2026–27)	Note
Cal Poly	8–1966, 1968–74	1975	Pac-12 Conference (Note: Primary conference: Big West)	
Portland State	3–1969, 1989–90	1996	—	Dropped wrestling in 2009 for economic reasons
Cal State Bakersfield	8–1976–77, 1979–83, 1987	1988	Pac-12 Conference	
UNI	2–1975, 1978	1982	Big 12 Conference (Note: Primary conference: Missouri Valley)	Won single division (now DI) title in 1950
SIUE	3–1984–86	2009	Southern Conference (Note: Primary conference: Ohio Valley)	
North Dakota State	4–1988, 1998, 2000–01	2004	Pac-12 Conference (Note: Primary conference: Summit League)	
Omaha	7–1991, 2004–06, 2009–11	2012	—	School dropped wrestling at start of its transition to Division I (Note: Omaha coach Mike Denny and several wrestlers moved to Maryville University to begin a "new" program.)

== See also ==
- NCAA Division I Men's Wrestling Championships
- NCAA Division III Men's Wrestling Championships
- NAIA national wrestling championship
- Pre-NCAA Wrestling Champion
- U Sports (Canada)
- Intercollegiate women's wrestling champions
