= List of NCAA Division I men's wrestling programs =

This is a list of men's collegiate wrestling programs in the United States that compete in NCAA Division I. For the 2026–27 NCAA Division I men's wrestling season, 77 schools in the United States sponsor Division I varsity men's wrestling. The most recent changes to the roster of D-I wrestling programs came in 2025–26 with the subtraction of one program. This list reflects each team's conference affiliation as of that season.

NB: Women's wrestling became an official NCAA championship sport in 2025–26; however, of the 113 women's programs that competed in 2025–26, only six are sponsored by Division I members.

== Men's wrestling conferences ==
- Before its 2024 expansion, the Big Ten Conference was the only all-sport conference whose members (14) all competed in wrestling. The four newest members, Oregon, USC, UCLA, and Washington, do not sponsor wrestling.
- The seven wrestling schools in the Atlantic Coast Conference (ACC) are all currently full members of the conference.
- The Mid-American Conference (MAC) had eight affiliate members in addition to five full members after adding the seven members of the Eastern Wrestling League (EWL) as new affiliates starting in the 2019–20 season. The number of affiliates was down to seven when Cleveland State dropped wrestling after the 2024–25 season, and the number of full members dropped by one when Northern Illinois moved to the non-wrestling Horizon League after the 2025–26 season, with NIU men's wrestling moving to the Pac-12 Conference.
- Following the 2024 collapse of the Pac-12 Conference, which saw 10 of the 12 full members leave—including two men's wrestling schools in Arizona State (Big 12) and Stanford (ACC)—the Pac-12 men's wrestling league had only 4 members, with one full member and three associates. The Pac-12 resumed full operation in 2026–27 with nine total full members, and still officially sponsors men's wrestling despite none of the seven new full members sponsoring that sport. The Pac-12 added five programs as men's wrestling affiliates in 2026–27. Northern Illinois joined from the MAC, and Air Force, North Dakota State, Northern Colorado, and South Dakota State joined from Big 12 men's wrestling.
- The Southern Conference (SoCon) with three full members that sponsor men's wrestling, meets the membership requirement by having six associate members, with the newest associate Bellarmine being the most recent addition in 2020–21 and completing the transition from Division II at the end of the 2023-24 season.
- The Eastern Intercollegiate Wrestling Association (EIWA) is a men's wrestling-only conference with 12 current members, the most recent addition being Morgan State University in 2024–25. EIWA member Franklin & Marshall is the only Division III school competing in Division I wrestling.
- The Ivy League is the newest Division I men's wrestling league, having been formed after the 2023-24 academic year. The six members that sponsor wrestling were previously members of the EIWA, but broke off after the 2023-24 season to have their own conference and tournament.
- The Big 12 Conference (Big 12) had lost its NCAA recognition when men's wrestling membership fell to only four full member schools, despite the fact that three of those four schools had won a combined 49 NCAA Division I wrestling team titles. On July 29, 2015, the Big 12 announced that the members of the Western Wrestling Conference (which had six members, but was not recognized by the NCAA) had been accepted as affiliate members of the Big 12, increasing the number of participating schools to ten and restoring the conference's automatic bids. The Big 12 has since added three more wrestling affiliates, though one of these, namely Fresno State, dropped the sport after the 2020–21 season. California Baptist was officially granted Division I status in August 2022. Missouri, previously a full Big 12 member before moving to the Southeastern Conference, where it was the only school that then sponsored wrestling, moved back to the conference as an affiliate in 2021-22 after spending the previous nine years as an affiliate member of the MAC. Oklahoma remained in Big 12 wrestling after otherwise joining the SEC in 2024. California Baptist dropped men's wrestling after the 2025–26 season, and Air Force, North Dakota State, Northern Colorado, and South Dakota State left at that time to become Pac-12 affiliates.

== Current Division I schools ==
School	Location	State	Nickname	Head Coach	Conference	Primary conference	National titles
American University	Washington	DC	Eagles	Jason Borrelli	EIWA	Patriot League	0
Appalachian State University	Boone	NC	Mountaineers	JohnMark Bentley	SoCon	Sun Belt	0
Arizona State University	Tempe	AZ	Sun Devils	Zeke Jones	Big 12		1 – 1988
Bellarmine University	Louisville	KY	Knights	Ned Shuck	SoCon	ASUN	0
Binghamton University	Vestal	NY	Bearcats	Kyle Borshoff	EIWA	America East	0
Commonwealth University-Bloomsburg (Bloomsburg)	Bloomsburg	PA	Huskies	John Stutzman	MAC	PSAC (Div. II)	0 (2 NAIA – 1960, 1965)
Brown University	Providence	RI	Bears	Jordan Leen	Ivy League		0
Bucknell University	Lewisburg	PA	Bison	Dan Wirnsberger	EIWA	Patriot League	0
University at Buffalo	Buffalo (Note: The entire University at Buffalo has a Buffalo mailing address, but its athletic administration and almost all of its athletic facilities, including the wrestling venue, are in the adjacent town of Amherst.)	NY	Bulls	Donnie Vinson	MAC		0 (1 Div. III – 1978)
California Polytechnic State University (Cal Poly)	San Luis Obispo	CA	Mustangs	Jon Sioredas	Pac-12	Big West	0 (8 Div II– 1966, 1968–74)
California State University, Bakersfield	Bakersfield	CA	Roadrunners	Luke Smith	Pac-12	Big West	0 (8 Div. II – 1976-77, 1979–83, 1987)
Campbell University	Buies Creek	NC	Fighting Camels	Scotti Sentes	SoCon	CAA	0
Central Michigan University	Mount Pleasant	MI	Chippewas	Ben Bennett	MAC		0
The Citadel	Charleston	SC	Bulldogs	Ryan LeBlanc	SoCon		0
Pennsylvania Western University, Clarion (Clarion)	Clarion	PA	Golden Eagles	Keith Ferraro	MAC	PSAC (Div. II)	0
Columbia University	New York	NY	Lions	Zach Tanelli	Ivy League		0
Cornell University	Ithaca	NY	Big Red	Mike Grey	Ivy League		0
Davidson College	Davidson	NC	Wildcats	Nate Carr Jr.	SoCon	Atlantic 10	0
Drexel University	Philadelphia	PA	Dragons	Matt Azevedo	EIWA	CAA	0
Duke University	Durham	NC	Blue Devils	Glenn Lanham	ACC		0
Pennsylvania Western University, Edinboro (Edinboro)	Edinboro	PA	Fighting Scots	Matt Hill	MAC	PSAC (Div. II)	0
Franklin & Marshall College	Lancaster	PA	Diplomats	Mike Rogers	EIWA	Centennial (Div. III)	0
Gardner-Webb University	Boiling Springs	NC	Runnin' Bulldogs	Daniel Elliot	SoCon	Big South	0
George Mason University	Fairfax (Note: The main campus has a Fairfax mailing address, but is outside the Fairfax city limits in unincorporated Fairfax County.)	VA	Patriots	Frank Beasley	MAC	Atlantic 10	0
Harvard University	Cambridge (Note: Although the athletic department offices and most athletic facilities are within the Boston city limits and have a Boston mailing address, the wrestling venue is in Cambridge, also home to the university administration and its undergraduate campus.)	MA	Crimson	Jay Weiss	Ivy League		0
Hofstra University	Hempstead	NY	Pride	Dennis Papadatos	EIWA	CAA	0
University of Illinois Urbana-Champaign (Illinois)	Champaign–Urbana	IL	Fighting Illini	Mike Poeta	Big Ten		0
Indiana University Bloomington (Indiana)	Bloomington	IN	Hoosiers	Angel Escobedo	Big Ten		1 – 1932
University of Iowa	Iowa City	IA	Hawkeyes	Tom Brands	Big Ten		24 – 1975-76, 1978–86, 1991–93, 1995-2000, 2008–10, 2021
Iowa State University	Ames	IA	Cyclones	Kevin Dresser	Big 12		8 – t-1933, 1965, 1969, 1970, 1972–73, 1977, 1987
Kent State University	Kent	OH	Golden Flashes	Jim Andrassy	MAC		0
Lehigh University	Bethlehem	PA	Mountain Hawks	Pat Santoro	EIWA	Patriot League	0
University of Arkansas at Little Rock (Little Rock)	Little Rock	AR	Trojans	Neil Erisman	Pac-12	UAC	0
Long Island University (LIU)	Brookville	NY	Sharks	Joe Patrovich	EIWA	NEC	0
Commonwealth University-Lock Haven (Lock Haven)	Lock Haven	PA	Bald Eagles	Scott Moore	MAC	PSAC (Div. II)	0 (4 NAIA – 1961, 1963, 1966–67)
University of Maryland, College Park (Maryland)	College Park	MD	Terrapins	Alex Clemsen	Big Ten		0
University of Michigan	Ann Arbor	MI	Wolverines	Sean Bormet	Big Ten		0
Michigan State University	East Lansing	MI	Spartans	Roger Chandler	Big Ten		1 – 1967
University of Minnesota	Minneapolis and St. Paul	MN	Golden Gophers	Brandon Eggum	Big Ten		3 – 2001-02, 2007
University of Missouri	Columbia	MO	Tigers	Brian Smith	Big 12	SEC	0
Morgan State University	Baltimore	MD	Bears	Kenny Monday	EIWA	MEAC	0
University of Nebraska–Lincoln (Nebraska)	Lincoln	NE	Cornhuskers	Mark Manning	Big Ten		0
North Carolina State University (NC State)	Raleigh	NC	Wolfpack	Pat Popolizio	ACC		0
University of North Carolina at Chapel Hill (North Carolina)	Chapel Hill	NC	Tar Heels	Rob Koll	ACC		0
North Dakota State University	Fargo	ND	Bison	Obe Blanc	Pac-12	Summit League	0 (4 Div. II – 1988, 1998, 2000–01)
University of Northern Colorado	Greeley	CO	Bears	Troy Nickerson	Pac-12	Big Sky	0
Northern Illinois University	DeKalb	IL	Huskies	Ryan Ludwig	Pac-12	Horizon League	0
University of Northern Iowa	Cedar Falls	IA	Panthers	Doug Schwab	Big 12	MVC	1 – 1950 (2 Div. II – 1975, 1978)
Northwestern University	Evanston	IL	Wildcats	Matt Stormiolo	Big Ten		0
Ohio University	Athens	OH	Bobcats	Joel Greenlee	MAC		0
Ohio State University	Columbus	OH	Buckeyes	Tom Ryan	Big Ten		1 – 2015
University of Oklahoma	Norman	OK	Sooners	Roger Kish	Big 12	SEC	7 – 1932, 1951-52, 1957, 1960, 1964, 1974
Oklahoma State University–Stillwater (Oklahoma State)	Stillwater	OK	Cowboys	David Taylor	Big 12		34 – 1928-31, t-1933, 1934–42, 1946, 1948–49, 1954–56, 1958–59, 1961–62, 1964, 1966, 1968, 1971, 1989, 1990, 1994, 2003–06
Oregon State University	Corvallis	OR	Beavers	Chris Pendleton	Pac-12		0
University of Pennsylvania (Penn)	Philadelphia	PA	Quakers	Matt Valenti	Ivy League		0
Pennsylvania State University (Penn State)	University Park	PA	Nittany Lions	Cael Sanderson	Big Ten		14 – 1953, 2011–14, 2016–19, 2022-2026
University of Pittsburgh	Pittsburgh	PA	Panthers	Keith Gavin	ACC		0
Presbyterian College	Clinton	SC	Blue Hose	Mark Cody	SoCon	Big South	0
Princeton University	Princeton	NJ	Tigers	Joe Dubuque	Ivy League		0
Purdue University	West Lafayette	IN	Boilermakers	Tony Ersland	Big Ten		0
Rider University	Lawrenceville	NJ	Broncs	John Hangey	MAC	Metro	0
Rutgers University–New Brunswick (Rutgers)	New Brunswick	NJ	Scarlet Knights	Scott Goodale	Big Ten		0
Sacred Heart University	Fairfield	CT	Pioneers	John Clark	EIWA	Metro	0
South Dakota State University	Brookings	SD	Jackrabbits	Damian Hahn	Pac-12	Summit League	0
Southern Illinois University Edwardsville (SIU Edwardsville or SIUE)	Edwardsville	IL	Cougars	Jeremy Spates	MAC	OVC	0 (3 Div. II – 1984-86)
Stanford University	Stanford	CA	Cardinal	Chris Ayres	ACC		0
University of Tennessee at Chattanooga (Chattanooga)	Chattanooga	TN	Mocs	Kyle Ruschell	SoCon		0
United States Air Force Academy (Air Force)	Colorado Springs	CO	Falcons	Sam Barber	Pac-12	Mountain West	0
United States Military Academy (Army)	West Point	NY	Black Knights	Kevin Ward	EIWA	Patriot League	0
United States Naval Academy (Navy)	Annapolis	MD	Midshipmen	Cary Kolat	EIWA	Patriot League	0
Utah Valley University	Orem	UT	Wolverines	Adam Hall	Big 12	Big West	0
University of Virginia	Charlottesville	VA	Cavaliers	Steve Garland	ACC		0
Virginia Military Institute (VMI)	Lexington	VA	Keydets	Jim Gibson	SoCon		0
Virginia Tech	Blacksburg	VA	Hokies	Tony Robie	ACC		0
West Virginia University	Morgantown	WV	Mountaineers	Tim Flynn	Big 12		0
University of Wisconsin–Madison (Wisconsin)	Madison	WI	Badgers	Chris Bono	Big Ten		0
University of Wyoming	Laramie	WY	Cowboys	Mark Branch	Big 12	Mountain West	0

== In transition ==
School	City	State	Nickname	Conference	Primary conference	National titles	Full membership
Mercyhurst University	Erie	Pennsylvania	Lakers	–	Northeast Conference	–	July 2027

== Map of Division I men's wrestling programs ==
All Division I men's wrestling programs during the 2026–27 season. Conferences (clockwise from northeast): purple pog: EIWA, green pog: Ivy League, cyan pog: ACC, black pog: SoCon, green dot: Big 12, red pog: Pac-12, blue dot: Big Ten, orange pog: MAC, white pog: Independent. Labels: 1: American, 2: Army, 3: Bloomsburg, 4: Bucknell, 5: Clarion, 6: Columbia, 7: Drexel, 8: Edinboro, 9: Franklin & Marshall, 10: George Mason, 11: Hofstra, 12: Lehigh, 13: Lock Haven, 14: LIU, 15: Mercyhurst, 16: Penn, 17: Penn St., 18: Princeton, 19: Rider, 20: Rutgers, 21: Sacred Heart, 22: Maryland

== Map of Defunct Division I men's wrestling programs (Since 1953) ==
Defunct Division I men's wrestling programs as of the 2026–27 season. Conference as of discontinuation (clockwise from northeast): blue marker: CAA, purple pog: EIWA, yellow pog: ACC, cyan pog: SEC, black pog: SoCon, green pog: Big 12, red pog: Pac-12, green marker: Big West, purple marker: Big Sky, yellow marker: WAC, orange pog: Missouri Valley, blue pog: OVC, white pog: MAC, black marker: Independent/Unknown Conference

Notes

- The NEIWA merged into ECC which merged into the CAA
- Dropped Collegiate Programs since 1953
- Dropped College Wrestling Teams

== See also ==
- Collegiate wrestling
- List of NCAA Division II men's wrestling programs
- List of NCAA Divisions II and III schools competing in NCAA Division I sports
- List of NCAA women's wrestling programs (in all divisions)
