= List of NCAA Divisions II and III schools competing in NCAA Division I sports =

The National Collegiate Athletic Association (NCAA) is divided into three divisions: Division I, Division II, and Division III. The main reason for Division II and Division III schools to compete in Division I is that certain sports have either only a single division or only Divisions I and III. As a result of this, there are some D-II and III conferences with a conference championship in a sport that has only one or two NCAA divisions (e.g. bowling, men's volleyball).

Some schools, however, have opted to compete in a sport at a higher level and are allowed to do so by the NCAA under certain circumstances. First, schools in Divisions II and III are allowed to classify one men's sport and one women's sport as Division I (except for football and basketball), provided that they were sponsoring said sports at Division I level prior to 2011. In addition to this, a lower-division school may compete as a Division I member in a given sport if the NCAA does not sponsor a championship in that sport for the school's own division. Division II schools may award scholarships and operate under Division I rules in their Division I sports. Division III schools cannot award scholarships in their Division I sports (except as noted below), but can operate under most Division I rules in those sports.

While many of the lower division schools playing with the "big schools" are frequently heavily outclassed, others not only compete successfully, but are among the elite programs in their sport (e.g. Alaska-Fairbanks in rifle, Johns Hopkins in men's lacrosse, Minnesota Duluth in both men's and women's ice hockey).

Five Division III members are allowed to award athletic scholarships in their Division I sports—a practice otherwise not allowed for Division III schools. All of these schools sponsored a men's sport in the NCAA University Division, the predecessor to today's Division I, before the NCAA adopted its current three-division setup in 1974–75. At that time, the NCAA did not sponsor championships in women's sports. Today, these schools, sometimes called "grandfathered", are allowed to award scholarships in the one originally grandfathered sport, plus one women's sport.

Notes

- Under current NCAA rules, beach volleyball and bowling are women's sports; rifle is technically a men's sport, but schools can field men's, women's, and/or mixed teams; skiing is a co-ed sport with teams having men's and women's squads. Fencing had the same status as skiing before the reinstatement of separate men's and women's team championships in 2025–26. Women's wrestling became an official NCAA championship sport in 2025–26, and acrobatics & tumbling and stunt will follow in 2026–27.
- Separate championships for Division II bowling and Division III women's wrestling will be established in 2027–28.
- Future conference affiliations indicated in this article will take effect on July 1 of the stated year. In the case of spring sports, the first year of competition will take place in the calendar year after the conference move becomes official.

== Division II schools competing in Division I ==
The following table is a list of Division II schools competing in Division I.

Conference affiliations reflect those for the specific sports in which each school competes alongside D-I schools, and do not necessarily match their primary affiliations. Years for conference moves or the addition of sports reflect calendar years. For spring sports, this is the year before the start of competition.

Legend: Pink = Leaving division. Green = Future.

School	Nickname	Location	Sport	Conference
Adams State	Grizzlies	Alamosa, CO	Women's wrestling	Rocky Mountain Athletic Conference
Adelphi	Panthers	Garden City, NY	Bowling (Note: A Division II bowling championship will be established in 2027–28.)	East Coast Conference
Alaska	Nanooks	Fairbanks, AK	Men's ice hockey	Independent
Alaska	Nanooks	Fairbanks, AK	Rifle	Patriot Rifle Conference
Alaska	Nanooks	Fairbanks, AK	Skiing	Central Collegiate Ski Association
Alaska Anchorage	Seawolves	Anchorage, AK	Men's ice hockey	Independent
Alaska Anchorage	Seawolves	Anchorage, AK	Women's gymnastics	Mountain Pacific Sports Federation
Allen	Yellow Jackets	Columbia, SC	Women's wrestling	Conference Carolinas
American International	Yellow Jackets	Springfield, MA	Men's volleyball	East Coast Conference
Assumption	Greyhounds	Worcester, MA	Men's ice hockey	Northeast-10 Conference
Assumption	Greyhounds	Worcester, MA	Women's ice hockey	New England Women's Hockey Alliance
Augusta	Jaguars	Augusta, GA	Men's golf	West Coast Conference
Augusta	Jaguars	Augusta, GA	Women's golf	West Coast Conference
Augustana (SD)	Vikings	Sioux Falls, SD	Men's ice hockey	Central Collegiate Hockey Association
Barry	Buccaneers	Miami Shores, FL	Beach volleyball	Sunshine State Conference
Barry	Buccaneers	Miami Shores, FL	Men's volleyball	Independent
Barton	Bulldogs	Wilson, NC	Men's volleyball	Conference Carolinas
Belmont Abbey	Crusaders	Belmont, NC	Bowling	Conference Carolinas
Belmont Abbey	Crusaders	Belmont, NC	Men's volleyball	Conference Carolinas
Bemidji State	Beavers	Bemidji, MN	Men's ice hockey	Central Collegiate Hockey Association
Bemidji State	Beavers	Bemidji, MN	Women's ice hockey	Western Collegiate Hockey Association
Benedict	Tigers	Columbia, SC	Men's volleyball	Southern Intercollegiate Athletic Conference
Bentley	Falcons	Waltham, MA	Men's ice hockey	Atlantic Hockey America
Biola	Eagles	La Mirada, CA	Men's water polo	Western Water Polo Association
Biola	Eagles	La Mirada, CA	Women's water polo	Western Water Polo Association
Bloomsburg	Huskies	Bloomsburg, PA	Men's wrestling	Mid-American Conference
Bluefield State	Big Blue	Bluefield, WV	Women's wrestling	Conference Carolinas
Bowie State	Bulldogs	Bowie, MD	Bowling	Central Intercollegiate Athletic Association
Bridgeport	Purple Knights	Bridgeport, CT	Women's gymnastics	Gymnastics East Conference
Bridgeport	Purple Knights	Bridgeport, CT	Women's wrestling	Independent
Caldwell	Cougars	Caldwell, NJ	Bowling	Central Atlantic Collegiate Conference
Cal State East Bay	Pioneers	Hayward, CA	Women's water polo	Western Water Polo Association
Cal State Los Angeles	Golden Eagles	Los Angeles, CA	Beach volleyball	Independent
Cal State Monterey Bay	Otters	Seaside, CA	Women's water polo	Western Water Polo Association
Carson–Newman	Eagles	Jefferson City, TN	Beach volleyball	South Atlantic Conference
Catawba	Indians	Salisbury, NC	Beach volleyball	South Atlantic Conference
Catawba	Indians	Salisbury, NC	Men's volleyball	Independent
Central Missouri	Jennies	Warrensburg, MO	Bowling	Great Lakes Valley Conference
Central State	Marauders	Wilberforce, OH	Men's volleyball	Southern Intercollegiate Athletic Conference
Chadron State	Eagles	Chadron, NE	Women's wrestling	Rocky Mountain Athletic Conference
Chaminade	Silverswords	Honolulu, HI	Beach volleyball	Independent
Charleston (WV)	Golden Eagles	Charleston, WV	Men's volleyball	Eastern Intercollegiate Volleyball Association
Chestnut Hill	Griffins	Philadelphia, PA	Bowling	Central Atlantic Collegiate Conference
Chowan	Hawks	Murfreesboro, NC	Bowling	Conference Carolinas
Clarion	Golden Eagles	Clarion, PA	Men's wrestling	Mid-American Conference
Colorado Mesa	Mavericks	Grand Junction, CO	Beach volleyball	Independent
Colorado Mesa	Mavericks	Grand Junction, CO	Women's wrestling	Rocky Mountain Athletic Conference
Concord	Mountain Lions	Athens, WV	Women's wrestling	Independent
Concordia–Irvine	Eagles	Irvine, CA	Beach volleyball	Independent
Concordia–Irvine	Eagles	Irvine, CA	Men's volleyball	Mountain Pacific Sports Federation
Concordia–Irvine	Eagles	Irvine, CA	Men's water polo	Western Water Polo Association
Concordia–Irvine	Eagles	Irvine, CA	Women's water polo	Golden Coast Conference
Daemen	Wildcats	Amherst, NY	Bowling	East Coast Conference
Daemen	Wildcats	Amherst, NY	Men's volleyball	Northeast Conference
Dallas Baptist	Patriots	Dallas, TX	Baseball	Pac-12 Conference
Davenport	Panthers	Grand Rapids, MI	Women's wrestling	Great Lakes Valley Conference
Dominican (NY)	Chargers	Orangeburg, NY	Men's volleyball	East Coast Conference
Drury	Panthers	Springfield, MO	Bowling	Great Lakes Valley Conference
D'Youville	Saints	Buffalo, NY	Bowling	East Coast Conference
D'Youville	Saints	Buffalo, NY	Men's volleyball	Northeast Conference
D'Youville	Saints	Buffalo, NY	Women's wrestling	Independent
East Stroudsburg	Warriors	East Stroudsburg, PA	Women's wrestling	Independent
Eckerd	Tritons	St. Petersburg, FL	Beach volleyball	Sunshine State Conference
Edinboro	Fighting Scots	Edinboro, PA	Men's wrestling	Mid-American Conference
Edward Waters	Tigers	Jacksonville, FL	Men's volleyball	Southern Intercollegiate Athletic Conference
Elizabeth City State	Vikings	Elizabeth City, NC	Bowling	Central Intercollegiate Athletic Association
Emmanuel (GA)	Lions	Franklin Springs, GA	Beach volleyball	South Atlantic Conference
Emmanuel (GA)	Lions	Franklin Springs, GA	Bowling	Conference Carolinas
Emmanuel (GA)	Lions	Franklin Springs, GA	Men's volleyball	Conference Carolinas
Emmanuel (GA)	Lions	Franklin Springs, GA	Women's wrestling	Conference Carolinas
Emory & Henry	Wasps	Emory, VA	Women's wrestling	Conference Carolinas
Erskine	Flying Fleet	Due West, SC	Beach volleyball	South Atlantic Conference
Erskine	Flying Fleet	Due West, SC	Men's volleyball	Conference Carolinas
Fayetteville State	Lady Broncos	Fayetteville, NC	Bowling	Central Intercollegiate Athletic Association
Felician	Golden Falcons	Rutherford, NJ	Bowling	Central Atlantic Collegiate Conference
Felician	Golden Falcons	Rutherford, NJ	Women's wrestling	Independent
Ferris State	Bulldogs	Big Rapids, MI	Men's ice hockey	Central Collegiate Hockey Association
Florida Southern	Moccasins	Lakeland, FL	Beach volleyball	Sunshine State Conference
Fort Hays State	Tigers	Hays, KS	Women's wrestling	Independent
Fort Valley State	Wildcats	Fort Valley, GA	Men's volleyball	Southern Intercollegiate Athletic Conference
Francis Marion	Patriots	Florence, SC	Men's golf	Big Sky Conference
Franklin Pierce	Ravens	Rindge, NH	Men's ice hockey	Northeast-10 Conference
Franklin Pierce	Ravens	Rindge, NH	Women's ice hockey	New England Women's Hockey Alliance
Fresno Pacific	Sunbirds	Fresno, CA	Men's water polo	Western Water Polo Association
Fresno Pacific	Sunbirds	Fresno, CA	Women's water polo	Western Water Polo Association
Frostburg State	Bobcats	Frostburg, MD	Women's wrestling	Independent
Gannon	Golden Knights	Erie, PA	Men's water polo	Western Water Polo Association
Gannon	Golden Knights	Erie, PA	Women's water polo	Western Water Polo Association
Gannon	Golden Knights	Erie, PA	Women's wrestling	Independent
Grand Valley State	Lakers	Allendale, MI	Women's wrestling	Great Lakes Valley Conference
Hawaii Pacific	Sharks	Honolulu, HI	Beach volleyball	Independent
Holy Family	Tigers	Philadelphia, PA	Bowling	Central Atlantic Collegiate Conference
Jamestown	Jimmies	Jamestown, ND	Men's volleyball	Great Lakes Valley Conference
Jamestown	Jimmies	Jamestown, ND	Women's wrestling	Independent
Jessup	Warriors	Rocklin, CA	Men's volleyball	Mountain Pacific Sports Federation
Johnson C. Smith	Golden Bulls	Charlotte, NC	Bowling	Central Intercollegiate Athletic Association
Kentucky State	Thorobreds	Frankfort, KY	Men's volleyball	Southern Intercollegiate Athletic Conference
King	Tornado	Bristol, TN	Men's volleyball	Conference Carolinas
King	Tornado	Bristol, TN	Women's wrestling	Conference Carolinas
Kutztown	Golden Bears	Kutztown, PA	Bowling	East Coast Conference
Lake Superior State	Lakers	Sault Ste. Marie, MI	Men's ice hockey	Central Collegiate Hockey Association
Lees–McRae	Bobcats	Banner Elk, NC	Men's volleyball	Conference Carolinas
LeMoyne–Owen	Magicians	Memphis, TN	Men's volleyball	Southern Intercollegiate Athletic Conference
Lewis	Flyers	Romeoville, IL	Bowling	Great Lakes Valley Conference
Lewis	Flyers	Romeoville, IL	Men's volleyball	Midwestern Intercollegiate Volleyball Association
Lincoln Memorial	Railsplitters	Harrogate, TN	Bowling	Conference Carolinas
Lincoln Memorial	Railsplitters	Harrogate, TN	Men's volleyball	Independent
Lincoln Memorial	Railsplitters	Harrogate, TN	Women's wrestling	Conference Carolinas
Livingstone	Blue Bears	Salisbury, NC	Bowling	Central Intercollegiate Athletic Association
Lock Haven	Bald Eagles	Lock Haven, PA	Field hockey	Atlantic 10 Conference
Lock Haven	Bald Eagles	Lock Haven, PA	Men's wrestling	Mid-American Conference
Lock Haven	Bald Eagles	Lock Haven, PA	Women's wrestling	Independent
Maryville	Saints	Town and Country, MO	Bowling	Great Lakes Valley Conference
Maryville	Saints	Town and Country, MO	Men's volleyball	Great Lakes Valley Conference
Maryville	Saints	Town and Country, MO	Men's ice hockey (2027)	TBA
McKendree	Bearcats	Lebanon, IL	Beach volleyball	Independent
McKendree	Bearcats	Lebanon, IL	Bowling	Great Lakes Valley Conference
McKendree	Bearcats	Lebanon, IL	Men's volleyball	Midwestern Intercollegiate Volleyball Association
McKendree	Bearcats	Lebanon, IL	Men's water polo	Western Water Polo Association
McKendree	Bearcats	Lebanon, IL	Women's water polo	Western Water Polo Association
McKendree	Bearcats	Lebanon, IL	Women's wrestling	Great Lakes Valley Conference
Menlo	Oaks	Atherton, CA	Men's volleyball	Mountain Pacific Sports Federation
Menlo	Oaks	Atherton, CA	Women's wrestling	Mountain Pacific Sports Federation
Mercy	Mavericks	Dobbs Ferry, NY	Men's volleyball	East Coast Conference
Michigan Tech	Huskies	Houghton, MI	Men's ice hockey	Central Collegiate Hockey Association
Michigan Tech	Huskies	Houghton, MI	Skiing	Central Collegiate Ski Association
Minnesota State–Mankato	Mavericks	Mankato, MN	Men's ice hockey	Central Collegiate Hockey Association
Minnesota State–Mankato	Mavericks	Mankato, MN	Women's ice hockey	Western Collegiate Hockey Association
Minnesota Duluth	Bulldogs	Duluth, MN	Men's ice hockey	National Collegiate Hockey Conference
Minnesota Duluth	Bulldogs	Duluth, MN	Women's ice hockey	Western Collegiate Hockey Association
Minot State	Beavers	Minot, ND	Women's wrestling	Independent
Missouri S&T	Miners	Rolla, MO	Men's volleyball	Great Lakes Valley Conference
Molloy	Lions	Rockville Centre, NY	Bowling	East Coast Conference
Monroe	Mustangs	New Rochelle, NY	Men's volleyball (2027)	TBC – likely East Coast Conference
Morehouse	Maroon Tigers	Atlanta, GA	Men's volleyball	Southern Intercollegiate Athletic Conference
Mount Olive	Trojans	Mount Olive, NC	Men's volleyball	Conference Carolinas
Mount Olive	Trojans	Mount Olive, NC	Women's wrestling	Conference Carolinas
Newberry	Wolves	Newberry, SC	Men's volleyball	Independent
Newberry	Wolves	Newberry, SC	Women's wrestling	Independent
North Georgia	Nighthawks	Dahlonega, GA	Rifle	Southern Conference
North Greenville	Trailblazers	Tigerville, SC	Men's volleyball	Conference Carolinas
Northeastern State	RiverHawks	Tahlequah, OK	Women's wrestling	Independent
Northern Michigan	Wildcats	Marquette, MI	Men's ice hockey	Central Collegiate Hockey Association
Northern Michigan	Wildcats	Marquette, MI	Skiing	Central Collegiate Ski Association
Northern Michigan	Wildcats	Marquette, MI	Women's wrestling	Great Lakes Valley Conference
Oklahoma Christian	Eagles and Lady Eagles	Oklahoma City, OK	Bowling	Independent
Palm Beach Atlantic	Sailfish	West Palm Beach, FL	Beach volleyball	Sunshine State Conference
Pitt–Johnstown	Mountain Cats	Johnstown, PA	Women's wrestling	Independent
Point Park	Pioneers	Pittsburgh, PA	Women's wrestling	Independent
Post	Eagles	Waterbury, CT	Men's ice hockey	Northeast-10 Conference
Post	Eagles	Waterbury, CT	Women's ice hockey	New England Women's Hockey Alliance
Puerto Rico–Bayamón	Cowboys	Bayamón, PR	Men's volleyball	Independent
Puerto Rico–Mayagüez	Colegio	Mayagüez, PR	Men's volleyball	Independent
Puerto Rico–Río Piedras	Colegio	Gallitos & Jerezanas, PR	Men's volleyball	Independent
Quincy	Hawks	Quincy, IL	Bowling	Great Lakes Valley Conference
Quincy	Hawks	Quincy, IL	Men's volleyball	Great Lakes Valley Conference
Quincy	Hawks	Quincy, IL	Women's wrestling	Great Lakes Valley Conference
Roberts Wesleyan	Redhawks	North Chili, NY	Bowling	East Coast Conference
Roberts Wesleyan	Redhawks	North Chili, NY	Men's volleyball	East Coast Conference
Rockhurst	Hawks	Kansas City, MO	Men's volleyball	Great Lakes Valley Conference
Roosevelt	Lakers	Chicago, IL	Men's volleyball	Great Lakes Valley Conference
Saint Anselm	Hawks	Goffstown, NH	Men's ice hockey	Northeast-10 Conference
Saint Anselm	Hawks	Goffstown, NH	Women's ice hockey	New England Women's Hockey Alliance
Saint Anselm	Hawks	Goffstown, NH	Bowling	East Coast Conference
St. Cloud State	Huskies	St. Cloud, MN	Men's ice hockey	National Collegiate Hockey Conference
St. Cloud State	Huskies	St. Cloud, MN	Women's ice hockey	Western Collegiate Hockey Association
St. Cloud State	Huskies	St. Cloud, MN	Skiing (Women's only)	Central Collegiate Ski Association
Saint Leo	Lions	St. Leo, FL	Beach volleyball	Sunshine State Conference
Saint Michael's	Purple Knights	Colchester, VT	Men's ice hockey	Northeast-10 Conference
Saint Michael's	Purple Knights	Colchester, VT	Women's ice hockey	New England Women's Hockey Alliance
Saint Michael's	Purple Knights	Colchester, VT	Skiing	Eastern Intercollegiate Ski Association
St. Thomas Aquinas	Spartans	Sparkill, NY	Bowling	East Coast Conference
St. Thomas Aquinas	Spartans	Sparkill, NY	Men's volleyball	East Coast Conference
Salem	Tigers	Salem, WV	Men's water polo	Western Water Polo Association
Salem	Tigers	Salem, WV	Women's water polo	Western Water Polo Association
Shaw	Bears	Raleigh, NC	Bowling	Central Intercollegiate Athletic Association
Shawnee State	Bears	Portsmouth, OH	Bowling	Independent
Simon Fraser	Red Leafs	Burnaby, BC	Women's wrestling	Rocky Mountain Athletic Conference (U Sports and CWUAA in 2027)
Sioux Falls	Cougars	Sioux Falls, SD	Women's wrestling	Independent
Southern Connecticut	Fighting Owls	New Haven, CT	Women's gymnastics	Gymnastics East Conference
Southern New Hampshire	Penmen	Manchester, NH	Men's ice hockey	Northeast-10 Conference
Southwest Baptist	Bearcats	Bolivar, MO	Beach volleyball	Independent
Southwest Baptist	Bearcats	Bolivar, MO	Men's volleyball	Great Lakes Valley Conference
Spring Hill	Badgers	Mobile, AL	Beach volleyball	Independent
Tampa	Spartans	Tampa, FL	Beach volleyball	Sunshine State Conference
Texas A&M–Kingsville	Javelinas	Kingsville, TX	Beach volleyball	Independent
Texas A&M–Texarkana	Eagles	Texarkana, TX	Beach volleyball (2027)	Independent
Texas Woman's	Pioneers	Denton, TX	Women's gymnastics	Midwest Independent Conference
Texas Woman's	Pioneers	Denton, TX	Women's wrestling	Rocky Mountain Athletic Conference
Tiffin	Dragons	Tiffin, OH	Women's wrestling	Independent
Tusculum	Pioneers	Tusculum, TN	Beach volleyball	South Atlantic Conference
Tusculum	Pioneers	Tusculum, TN	Bowling	Conference Carolinas
Tusculum	Pioneers	Tusculum, TN	Men's volleyball	Independent
UC Merced	Golden Bobcats	Merced, CA	Men's volleyball	Mountain Pacific Sports Federation
UC Merced	Golden Bobcats	Merced, CA	Men's water polo	Western Water Polo Association
UC Merced	Golden Bobcats	Merced, CA	Women's water polo	Western Water Polo Association
Upper Iowa	Peacocks	Fayette, IA	Women's wrestling	Great Lakes Valley Conference
Ursuline	Arrows	Pepper Pike, OH	Bowling	Great Midwest Athletic Conference
Vanguard	Lions	Costa Mesa, CA	Beach volleyball	Independent
Vanguard	Lions	Costa Mesa, CA	Men's volleyball	Mountain Pacific Sports Federation
Vanguard	Lions	Costa Mesa, CA	Women's wrestling	Mountain Pacific Sports Federation
Virginia State	Trojans	Ettrick, VA	Bowling	Central Intercollegiate Athletic Association
Virginia Union	Panthers	Richmond, VA	Bowling	Central Intercollegiate Athletic Association
Walsh	Cavaliers	North Canton, OH	Bowling	Great Midwest Athletic Conference
Wayne State (MI)	Warriors	Detroit, MI	Men's fencing	Midwest Fencing Conference
Wayne State (MI)	Warriors	Detroit, MI	Women's fencing	Midwest Fencing Conference
Wayne State (NE)	Wildcats	Wayne, NE	Beach volleyball	Independent
West Chester	Golden Rams	West Chester, PA	Women's gymnastics	Gymnastics East Conference
West Liberty	Hilltoppers	West Liberty, WV	Women's wrestling	Independent
Western Colorado	Mountaineers	Gunnison, CO	Women's wrestling	Rocky Mountain Athletic Conference
Westminster (UT)	Griffins	Salt Lake City, UT	Skiing	Rocky Mountain Intercollegiate Ski Association
Wheeling	Cardinals	Wheeling, WV	Women's wrestling	TBA
William Jewell	Cardinals	Liberty, MO	Women's wrestling	Great Lakes Valley Conference
Wilmington	Wildcats	New Castle, DE	Bowling	Central Atlantic Collegiate Conference
Winona State	Warriors	Winona, MN	Women's gymnastics	Wisconsin Intercollegiate Athletic Conference

== Division III schools competing in Division I ==
The following table is a list of Division III schools competing in Division I, including those which play in sports that have only one national championship event open to members of all NCAA divisions. Grandfathered schools, with their scholarship sports, are indicated in bold type.

Conference affiliations reflect those for the specific sports in which each school competes alongside D-I schools, and do not necessarily match their primary affiliations.

School	Nickname	City	Sport	Conference
Adrian	Bulldogs	Adrian, MI	Bowling	Independent
Adrian	Bulldogs	Adrian, MI	Women's wrestling (Note: A Division III women's wrestling championship will be established in 2027–28.)	Independent
Albion	Britons	Albion, MI	Women's wrestling	Independent
Alfred State	Pioneers	Alfred, NY	Women's wrestling	Allegheny Mountain Collegiate Conference
Alma	Scots	Alma, MI	Bowling	Independent
Alma	Scots	Alma, MI	Women's wrestling	Independent
Alvernia	Golden Wolves	Reading, PA	Women's wrestling	Middle Atlantic Conference
Arcadia	Knights	Glenside, PA	Women's wrestling	Middle Atlantic Conference
Augsburg	Auggies	Minneapolis, MN	Women's wrestling	Independent
Augustana (IL)	Vikings	Rock Island, IL	Bowling	College Conference of Illinois and Wisconsin
Augustana (IL)	Vikings	Rock Island, IL	Men's water polo	Mountain Pacific Sports Federation
Augustana (IL)	Vikings	Rock Island, IL	Women's water polo	Collegiate Water Polo Association
Augustana (IL)	Vikings	Rock Island, IL	Women's wrestling	College Conference of Illinois and Wisconsin
Aurora	Spartans	Aurora, IL	Bowling	College Conference of Illinois and Wisconsin
Aurora	Spartans	Aurora, IL	Women's wrestling	College Conference of Illinois and Wisconsin
Austin	Kangaroos	Sherman, TX	Men's water polo	Mountain Pacific Sports Federation
Austin	Kangaroos	Sherman, TX	Women's water polo	Collegiate Water Polo Association
Azusa Pacific	Cougars	Azusa, CA	Women's water polo	Southern California Intercollegiate Athletic Conference
Babson	Beavers	Wellesley, MA	Skiing	Independent
Baldwin Wallace	Yellow Jackets	Berea, OH	Women's wrestling	Independent
Bates	Bobcats	Lewiston, ME	Skiing	Eastern Intercollegiate Ski Association
Berry	Vikings	Mount Berry, GA	Beach volleyball	Independent
Bethany (WV)	Bison	Bethany, WV	Women's wrestling	Independent
Bowdoin	Polar Bears	Brunswick, ME	Skiing	Eastern Intercollegiate Ski Association
Brandeis	Judges	Waltham, MA	Men's fencing	Independent
Brandeis	Judges	Waltham, MA	Women's fencing	Independent
Brockport	Golden Eagles	Brockport, NY	Women's gymnastics	Eastern College Athletic Conference
Buena Vista	Beavers	Storm Lake, IA	Women's wrestling	American Rivers Conference
Buffalo State	Bengals	Buffalo, NY	Women's wrestling	Allegheny Mountain Collegiate Conference
Caltech	Beavers	Pasadena, CA	Men's fencing	Independent
Caltech	Beavers	Pasadena, CA	Women's fencing	Independent
Caltech	Beavers	Pasadena, CA	Men's water polo	Southern California Intercollegiate Athletic Conference
Caltech	Beavers	Pasadena, CA	Women's water polo	Southern California Intercollegiate Athletic Conference
Cal Lutheran	Kingsmen & Regals	Thousand Oaks, CA	Men's water polo	Southern California Intercollegiate Athletic Conference
Cal Lutheran	Kingsmen & Regals	Thousand Oaks, CA	Women's water polo	Southern California Intercollegiate Athletic Conference
Carthage	Firebirds	Kenosha, WI	Bowling	College Conference of Illinois and Wisconsin
Carthage	Firebirds	Kenosha, WI	Women's wrestling	College Conference of Illinois and Wisconsin
Cedar Crest	Falcons	Allentown, PA	Women's wrestling	Independent
Centenary (LA)	Ladies	Shreveport, LA	Women's gymnastics	Midwest Independent Conference
Centenary (NJ)	Cyclones	Hackettstown, NJ	Women's wrestling	Independent
Central (IA)	Dutch	Pella, IA	Women's wrestling	American Rivers Conference
Chapman	Panthers	Orange, CA	Men's water polo	Southern California Intercollegiate Athletic Conference
Chapman	Panthers	Orange, CA	Women's water polo	Southern California Intercollegiate Athletic Conference
Chatham	Cougars	Pittsburgh, PA	Women's wrestling	TBA
CCNY	Beavers	New York, NY (Note: The US Postal Service uses "New York, NY" as an address only for Manhattan. Addresses in the rest of the city reflect a borough or a neighborhood.)	Women's fencing	National Intercollegiate Women's Fencing Association
Claremont–Mudd–Scripps Colleges (Note: A combined team of Claremont McKenna College, Harvey Mudd College, and Scripps College.)	Stags & Athenas	Claremont, CA	Men's water polo	Southern California Intercollegiate Athletic Conference
Claremont–Mudd–Scripps Colleges	Stags & Athenas	Claremont, CA	Women's water polo	Southern California Intercollegiate Athletic Conference
**Clarkson**	Golden Knights	Potsdam, NY	**Men's** ice hockey	ECAC Hockey
**Clarkson**	Golden Knights	Potsdam, NY	**Women's** ice hockey	ECAC Hockey
Coast Guard	Bears	New London, CT	Rifle	Mid-Atlantic Rifle Conference
Coe	Kohawks	Cedar Rapids, IA	Women's wrestling	American Rivers Conference
Colby	Mules	Waterville, ME	Skiing	Eastern Intercollegiate Ski Association
Colby–Sawyer	Chargers	New London, NH	Skiing	Eastern Intercollegiate Ski Association
**Colorado College**	Tigers	Colorado Springs, CO	**Men's** ice hockey	National Collegiate Hockey Conference
**Colorado College**	Tigers	Colorado Springs, CO	**Women's** soccer	Mountain West Conference
Connecticut College	Camels	New London, CT	Men's water polo	Northeast Water Polo Conference
Connecticut College	Camels	New London, CT	Women's water polo	Collegiate Water Polo Association
Cornell (IA)	Rams	Mount Vernon, IA	Women's wrestling	Independent
Cortland State	Red Dragons	Cortland, NY	Women's gymnastics	Independent
Delaware Valley	Aggies	Doylestown, PA (Note: The campus has a Doylestown mailing address, but is located in the separate jurisdictions of Doylestown Township and New Britain.)	Men's fencing	Independent
Delaware Valley	Aggies	Doylestown, PA	Women's fencing	Independent
Delaware Valley	Aggies	Doylestown, PA	Women's wrestling	Middle Atlantic Conference
Dubuque	Spartans	Dubuque, IA	Women's wrestling	American Rivers Conference
Drew	Rangers	Madison, NJ	Men's fencing	Independent
Drew	Rangers	Madison, NJ	Women's fencing	National Intercollegiate Women's Fencing Association
East Texas Baptist	Tigers	Marshall, TX	Beach volleyball	Independent
Eastern	Eagles	St. Davids, PA	Women's wrestling	Middle Atlantic Conference
Elmhurst	Bluejays	Elmhurst, IL	Bowling	College Conference of Illinois and Wisconsin
Elmhurst	Bluejays	Elmhurst, IL	Women's wrestling	College Conference of Illinois and Wisconsin
Elmira	Soring Eagles	Elmira, NY	Women's wrestling	Allegheny Mountain Collegiate Conference
Eureka	Red Devils	Eureka, IL	Women's wrestling	St. Louis Intercollegiate Athletic Conference
Franklin & Marshall	Diplomats	Lancaster, PA	Men's wrestling	Eastern Intercollegiate Wrestling Association
Gettysburg	Bullets	Gettysburg, PA	Women's wrestling	Independent
Greensboro	Pride	Greensboro, NC	Women's wrestling	Independent
Greenville	Panthers	Greenville, IL	Men's gymnastics	Eastern Intercollegiate Gymnastics League
Greenville	Panthers	Greenville, IL	Women's gymnastics	Independent (Wisconsin Intercollegiate Athletic Conference in 2026)
Grove City	Wolverines	Grove City, PA	Women's water polo	Collegiate Water Polo Association
Gustavus Adolphus	Golden Gusties	St. Peter, MN	Women's gymnastics	Wisconsin Intercollegiate Athletic Conference
Gustavus Adolphus	Golden Gusties	St. Peter, MN	Skiing	Central Collegiate Ski Association
Hamline	Pipers	St. Paul, MN	Women's gymnastics	Wisconsin Intercollegiate Athletic Conference
Haverford	Fords	Haverford, PA	Men's fencing	Independent
Haverford	Fords	Haverford, PA	Women's fencing	National Intercollegiate Women's Fencing Association
Heidelberg	Student Princes	Tiffin, OH	Women's wrestling	Independent
Hendrix	Warriors	Conway, AR	Beach volleyball	Independent
Hilbert	Hawks	Hamburg, NY	Bowling	Allegheny Mountain Collegiate Conference
Hiram	Terriers	Hiram, OH	Women's wrestling	Allegheny Mountain Collegiate Conference
Hobart	Statesmen	Geneva, NY	Men's lacrosse	Northeast Conference
Hunter	Hawks	New York, NY	Men's fencing	Independent
Hunter	Hawks	New York, NY	Women's fencing	National Intercollegiate Women's Fencing Association
Huntingdon	Hawks	Montgomery, AL	Beach volleyball	Independent
Huntingdon	Hawks	Montgomery, AL	Women's wrestling	St. Louis Intercollegiate Athletic Conference
Illinois Wesleyan	Titans	Bloomington, IL	Bowling	College Conference of Illinois and Wisconsin
Illinois Wesleyan	Titans	Bloomington, IL	Women's wrestling	College Conference of Illinois and Wisconsin
Ithaca	Bombers	Ithaca, NY	Women's gymnastics	Independent
Ithaca	Bombers	Ithaca, NY	Women's wrestling	Independent
John Carroll	Blue Streaks	University Heights, OH	Women's wrestling	Allegheny Mountain Collegiate Conference
John Jay	Bloodhounds	New York, NY	Rifle	Mid-Atlantic Rifle Conference
**Johns Hopkins**	Blue Jays	Baltimore, MD	Men's fencing	Independent
**Johns Hopkins**	Blue Jays	Baltimore, MD	Women's fencing	National Intercollegiate Women's Fencing Association
**Johns Hopkins**	Blue Jays	Baltimore, MD	**Men's** lacrosse	Big Ten Conference
**Johns Hopkins**	Blue Jays	Baltimore, MD	**Women's** lacrosse	Big Ten Conference
**Johns Hopkins**	Blue Jays	Baltimore, MD	Men's water polo	Collegiate Water Polo Association
Kean	Cougars	Union, NJ	Women's wrestling	Independent
Keystone	Giants	La Plume, PA	Women's wrestling	TBA
LaGrange	Panthers	LaGrange, GA	Beach volleyball	Independent
Lakeland	Muskies	Plymouth, WI (Note: The main campus has a Plymouth mailing address but is located in the nearby town of Herman.)	Bowling	College Conference of Illinois and Wisconsin
Lakeland	Muskies	Plymouth, WI	Women's wrestling	College Conference of Illinois and Wisconsin
La Verne	Leopards	La Verne, CA	Men's water polo	Southern California Intercollegiate Athletic Conference
La Verne	Leopards	La Verne, CA	Women's water polo	Southern California Intercollegiate Athletic Conference
Lawrence	Vikings	Appleton, WI	Men's fencing	Independent
Lawrence	Vikings	Appleton, WI	Women's fencing	Independent
Linfield	Wildcats	McMinnville, OR	Women's wrestling	Independent
Loras	Duhawks	Dubuque, IA	Women's wrestling	American Rivers Conference
Luther (IA)	Norse	Decorah, IA	Women's wrestling	American Rivers Conference
Lynchburg	Hornets	Lynchburg, VA	Beach volleyball	Independent
Lyon	Scots	Batesville, AR	Women's wrestling	St. Louis Intercollegiate Athletic Conference
Macalester	Scots	St. Paul, MN	Women's water polo	Collegiate Water Polo Association
Maine Maritime	Mariners	Castine, ME	Women's wrestling	Independent
Maine–Presque Isle	Owls	Presque Isle, ME	Skiing	Eastern Intercollegiate Ski Association
Manchester	Spartans	North Manchester, IN	Women's wrestling	Independent
Marian (WI)	Sabres	Fond du Lac, WI	Bowling	College Conference of Illinois and Wisconsin
Maritime College	Privateers	Fort Schuyler, NY	Rifle	Mid-Atlantic Rifle Conference
Mary Hardin–Baylor	Crusaders	Belton, TX	Beach volleyball	Independent
Marymount	Saints	Arlington, VA	Women's wrestling	Independent
Massachusetts Maritime	Buccaneers	Buzzards Bay, MA	Women's rifle	Independent
McDaniel	Green Terror	Westminster, MD	Women's wrestling	Independent
McMurry	War Hawks	Abilene, TX	Men's gymnastics (2027)	TBA
McMurry	War Hawks	Abilene, TX	Women's gymnastics (2027)	TBA
Middlebury	Panthers	Middlebury, VT	Skiing	Eastern Intercollegiate Ski Association
Millikin	Big Blue	Decatur, IL	Women's wrestling	College Conference of Illinois and Wisconsin
Misericordia	Cougars	Dallas, PA	Women's wrestling	Middle Atlantic Conference
MIT	Engineers	Cambridge, MA	Men's fencing	Eastern College Athletic Conference
MIT	Engineers	Cambridge, MA	Women's fencing	Eastern College Athletic Conference
MIT	Engineers	Cambridge, MA	Rifle	Mid-Atlantic Rifle Conference
MIT	Engineers	Cambridge, MA	Rowing	Patriot League
MIT	Engineers	Cambridge, MA	Men's water polo	Collegiate Water Polo Association
Mount Aloysius	Mounties	Cresson, PA	Bowling	Allegheny Mountain Collegiate Conference
Mount St. Joseph	Lions	Delhi Township, OH (Note: The campus has a Cincinnati mailing address.)	Women's wrestling	TBA
Mount Union	Purple Raiders	Alliance, OH	Women's wrestling	Independent
Muhlenberg	Mules	Allentown, PA	Women's wrestling	Independent
New England College	Pilgrims	Henniker, NH	Women's wrestling	New England Wrestling Association
North Central (IL)	Cardinals	Naperville, IL	Bowling	College Conference of Illinois and Wisconsin
North Central (IL)	Cardinals	Naperville, IL	Women's wrestling	College Conference of Illinois and Wisconsin
Norwich	Cadets	Northfield, VT	Women's wrestling	New England Wrestling Association
NYU	Violets	New York, NY	Men's fencing	Independent
NYU	Violets	New York, NY	Women's fencing	Independent
Occidental	Tigers	Los Angeles, CA	Men's water polo	Southern California Intercollegiate Athletic Conference
Occidental	Tigers	Los Angeles, CA	Women's water polo	Southern California Intercollegiate Athletic Conference
Otterbein	Cardinals	Westerville, OH	Women's wrestling	Independent
Pacific (OR)	Bozers	Forest Grove, OR	Women's wrestling	Independent
Penn State Altoona	Lions	Logan Township, PA (Note: The campus has an Altoona mailing address.)	Bowling	Allegheny Mountain Collegiate Conference
Penn State Altoona	Lions	Logan Township, PA	Women's wrestling	Allegheny Mountain Collegiate Conference
Penn State Behrend	Lions	Erie, PA	Bowling	Allegheny Mountain Collegiate Conference
Penn State Behrend	Lions	Erie, PA	Men's water polo	Mountain Pacific Sports Federation
Penn State Behrend	Lions	Erie, PA	Women's water polo	Collegiate Water Polo Association
Pitt–Bradford	Panthers	Bradford, PA	Bowling	Allegheny Mountain Collegiate Conference
Plymouth State	Panthers	Plymouth, NH	Skiing	Eastern Intercollegiate Ski Association
Pomona–Pitzer Colleges (Note: A combined team of Pomona College and Pitzer College.)	Sagehens	Claremont, CA	Men's water polo	Southern California Intercollegiate Athletic Conference
Pomona–Pitzer Colleges	Sagehens	Claremont, CA	Women's water polo	Southern California Intercollegiate Athletic Conference
Randolph	WildCats	Lynchburg, VA	Women's wrestling	Independent
Redlands	Bulldogs	Redlands, CA	Men's water polo	Southern California Intercollegiate Athletic Conference
Redlands	Bulldogs	Redlands, CA	Women's water polo	Southern California Intercollegiate Athletic Conference
**RPI**	Engineers	Troy, NY	**Men's** ice hockey	ECAC Hockey
**RPI**	Engineers	Troy, NY	**Women's** ice hockey	ECAC Hockey
Rhode Island College	Anchorwomen	Providence, RI	Women's gymnastics	Independent
RIT	Tigers	Henrietta, NY (Note: The campus has a Rochester mailing address.)	Men's ice hockey	Atlantic Hockey America
RIT	Tigers	Henrietta, NY	Women's ice hockey	Atlantic Hockey America
Rose–Hulman	Fightin' Engineers	Terre Haute, IN	Rifle	Independent
**St. Lawrence**	Saints	Canton, NY	**Men's** ice hockey	ECAC Hockey
**St. Lawrence**	Saints	Canton, NY	**Women's** ice hockey	ECAC Hockey
**St. Lawrence**	Saints	Canton, NY	Skiing	Eastern Intercollegiate Ski Association
St. Olaf	Oles	Northfield, MN	Skiing	Central Collegiate Ski Association
St. Scholastica	Saints	Duluth, MN	Skiing	Central Collegiate Ski Association
Saint Vincent	Bearcats	Latrobe, PA	Bowling	Allegheny Mountain Collegiate Conference
Schreiner	Mountaineers	Kerrville, TX	Women's wrestling	St. Louis Intercollegiate Athletic Conference
Simpson	Storm	Indianola, IA	Men's gymnastics	Eastern Intercollegiate Gymnastics League
Simpson	Storm	Indianola, IA	Women's gymnastics	Wisconsin Intercollegiate Athletic Conference
Simpson	Storm	Indianola, IA	Women's wrestling	American Rivers Conference
Smith	Pioneers	Northampton, MA	Women's fencing	National Intercollegiate Women's Fencing Association
Southern Virginia	Knights	Buena Vista, VA	Women's wrestling	Independent
Springfield (MA)	Pride	Springfield, MA	Men's gymnastics	Eastern Intercollegiate Gymnastics League
Springfield (MA)	Pride	Springfield, MA	Women's gymnastics	Eastern College Athletic Conference
Stevens	Ducks	Hoboken, NJ	Men's fencing	Independent
Stevens	Ducks	Hoboken, NJ	Women's fencing	National Intercollegiate Women's Fencing Association
Stevenson	Mustangs	Baltimore County, MD	Beach volleyball	Independent
Trine	Thunder	Angola, IN	Women's wrestling	Independent
Tufts	Jumbos	Medford, MA	Women's fencing	Independent
Union (NY)	Garnet Chargers	Schenectady, NY	Men's ice hockey	ECAC Hockey
Union (NY)	Garnet Chargers	Schenectady, NY	Women's ice hockey	ECAC Hockey
Ursinus	Bears	Collegeville, PA	Women's gymnastics	Eastern College Athletic Conference
Ursinus	Bears	Collegeville, PA	Women's wrestling	Independent
Utica	Pioneers	Utica, NY	Women's water polo	Collegiate Water Polo Association
Utica	Pioneers	Utica, NY	Women's wrestling	Independent
Vassar	Brewers	Poughkeepsie, NY	Men's fencing	Eastern College Athletic Conference
Vassar	Brewers	Poughkeepsie, NY	Women's fencing	Eastern College Athletic Conference
Vermont State Castleton	Spartans	Castleton, VT	Skiing	Independent
Wartburg	Knights	Waverly, IA	Women's wrestling	American Rivers Conference
Washington & Jefferson	Presidents	Washington, PA	Men's water polo	Mountain Pacific Sports Federation
Washington & Jefferson	Presidents	Washington, PA	Women's water polo	Collegiate Water Polo Association
Waynesburg	Yellow Jackets	Waynesburg, PA	Women's wrestling	Independent
Wellesley	Blue	Wellesley, MA	Women's fencing	Independent
Western New England	Golden Bears	Springfield, MA	Women's wrestling	Independent
Westminster (MO)	Blue Jays	Fulton, MO	Women's wrestling	St. Louis Intercollegiate Athletic Conference
Whittier	Poets	Whittier, CA	Men's water polo	Southern California Intercollegiate Athletic Conference
Whittier	Poets	Whittier, CA	Women's water polo	Southern California Intercollegiate Athletic Conference
Williams	Ephs	Williamstown, MA	Skiing	Eastern Intercollegiate Ski Association
Wilkes	Colonials	Wilkes-Barre, PA	Women's wrestling	Independent
Wisconsin–Eau Claire	Blugolds	Eau Claire, WI	Women's gymnastics	Wisconsin Intercollegiate Athletic Conference
Wisconsin–La Crosse	Eagles	La Crosse, WI	Women's gymnastics	Wisconsin Intercollegiate Athletic Conference
Wisconsin–Oshkosh	Titans	Oshkosh, WI	Women's gymnastics	Wisconsin Intercollegiate Athletic Conference
Wisconsin–Oshkosh	Titans	Oshkosh, WI	Women's wrestling	Independent
Wisconsin–Stevens Point	Pointers	Stevens Point, WI	Women's wrestling	Independent
Wisconsin–Stout	Blue Devils	Menomonie, WI	Women's gymnastics	Wisconsin Intercollegiate Athletic Conference
Wisconsin–Whitewater	Warhawks	Whitewater, WI	Bowling	Independent
Wisconsin–Whitewater	Warhawks	Whitewater, WI	Women's gymnastics	Wisconsin Intercollegiate Athletic Conference
Wittenberg	Tigers	Springfield, OH	Women's water polo	Collegiate Water Polo Association
Wittenberg	Tigers	Springfield, OH	Women's wrestling	TBA
Yeshiva	Maccabees	New York, NY	Men's fencing	Independent
Yeshiva	Maccabees	New York, NY	Women's fencing	National Intercollegiate Women's Fencing Association
York (PA)	Spartans	Spring Garden Township, PA (Note: The campus has a York mailing address.)	Women's wrestling	Middle Atlantic Conference

== See also ==
- List of NCAA Division I institutions
- List of NCAA Division II institutions
- List of NCAA Division III institutions
