= John M. Belk Arena =

Arena in North Carolina, United States

- McKillop Court
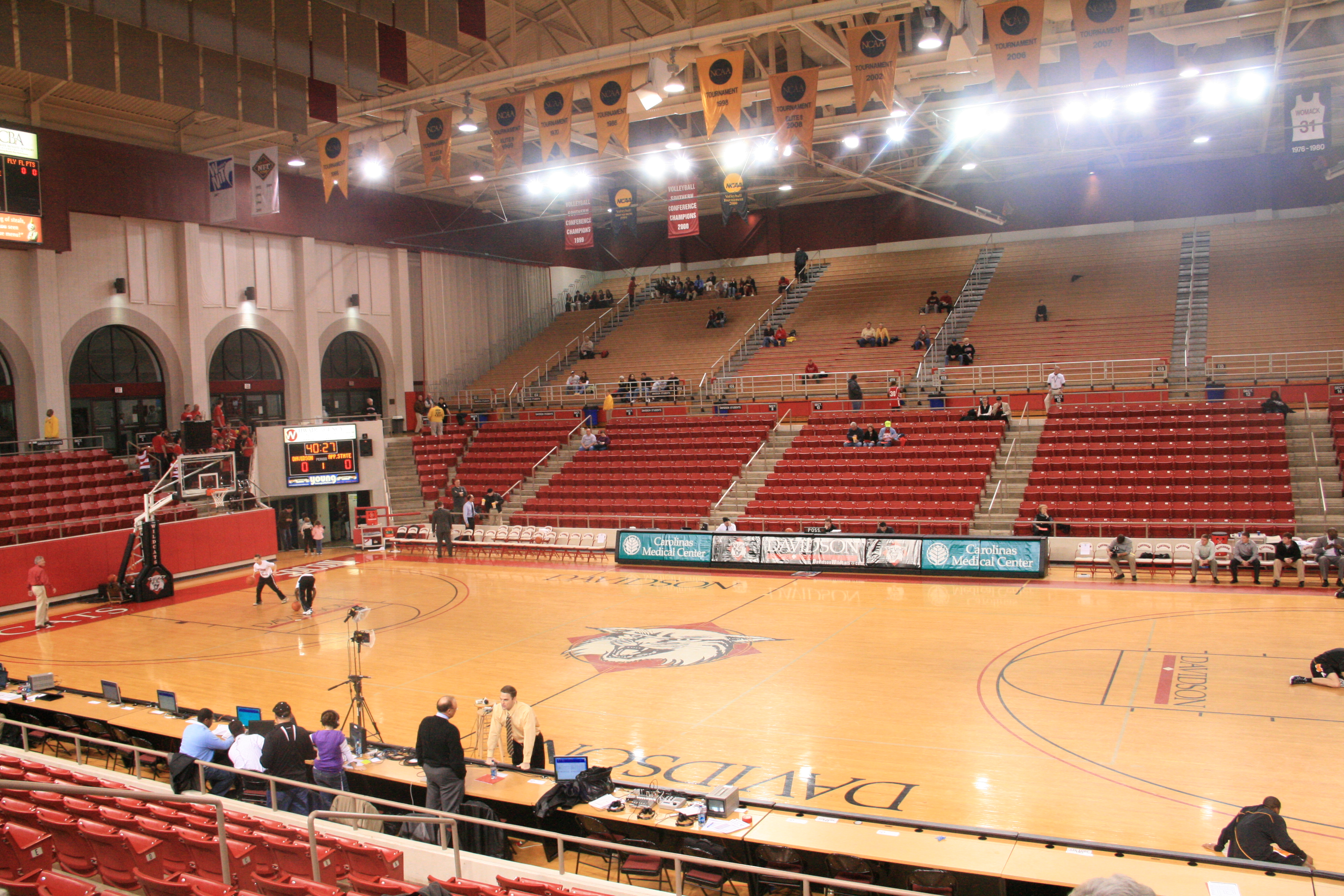
- Interactive map of John M. Belk Arena
- Location: 200 Baker Drive; Davidson, North Carolina, USA
- Coordinates: 35.499278°N 80.840521°W
- Owner: Davidson College
- Operator: Davidson College
- Capacity: 4,300
- Surface: Hardwood

Construction
- Groundbreaking: September 1988
- Opened: November 12, 1989
- Cost: $12.3 million ($31.9 million in 2025 dollars)
- Architects: O'Dell & Associates, Inc.
- General contractors: Rodgers Builders, Inc.

Tenants
- Davidson men's and women's basketball Davidson women's volleyball

John M. Belk Arena is a 5,295-seat multi-purpose arena, located on the campus of Davidson College, in Davidson, North Carolina, United States. It is named for Davidson alumnus and benefactor John M. Belk (1920–2007), class of 1943.

As the centerpiece of the Baker Sports Complex, it is home to the Davidson Wildcats men's and women's basketball teams, the Davidson Wildcats wrestling team, and the women's volleyball team.

The playing surface is named McKillop Court in honor of former men's basketball coach Bob McKillop, who has coached the most victories in the school's history.

Bob Dylan performed at the arena during his 2006 North American Tour on May 2, 2006.

== See also ==
- List of NCAA Division I basketball arenas
