= List of NCAA women's wrestling programs =

These collegiate women's wrestling teams compete as members of the National Collegiate Athletic Association (NCAA). Currently, 125 NCAA member athletic programs—124 in the United States and one in Canada—sponsor the sport. The majority of competing programs are members of Division III; a large minority of participants are in Division II, and only seven are members of Division I. The 2025–26 school year was the first for women's wrestling as an official NCAA championship sport. The first championship meet used what the NCAA calls the "National Collegiate" format, in which members of all divisions competed.

At the 2026 NCAA convention, Division III approved the establishment of its own women's wrestling championship. The first Division III championship will be held in spring 2028.

== Current teams ==
As of the 2026–27 season, these schools sponsor a women's wrestling team that is recognized by the NCAA. All institutions on this list are located within the United States except for Simon Fraser (the NCAA's only Canadian member), located in the Vancouver suburb of Burnaby. Conference affiliations reflect those for wrestling, and do not necessarily match the schools' primary conferences.

NB: Conference affiliations are mostly drawn from the NCAA membership directory. However, some schools are listed in that directory with women's wrestling membership in conferences that do not sponsor the sport. All discrepancies were cross-checked against conference websites.

Institution	Teams	Location	State/province	Conference	Division
Delaware State	Hornets	Dover	DE	Independent	I
Iowa	Hawkeyes	Iowa City	IA	Independent	I
Lehigh	Mountain Hawks	Bethlehem	PA	Independent	I
Lindenwood	Lions	St. Charles	MO	Independent	I
Mercyhurst	Lakers	Erie	PA	Independent	I
Presbyterian	Blue Hose	Clinton	SC	Independent	I
Sacred Heart	Pioneers	Fairfield	CT	Independent	I
Adams State	Grizzlies	Alamosa	CO	Rocky Mountain Athletic Conference	II
Allen	Yellow Jackets	Columbia	SC	Conference Carolinas	II
Bluefield State	Big Blue	Bluefield	WV	Conference Carolinas	II
Bridgeport	Purple Knights	Bridgeport	CT	Independent	II
Chadron State	Eagles	Chadron	NE	Rocky Mountain Athletic Conference	II
Colorado Mesa	Mavericks	Grand Junction	CO	Rocky Mountain Athletic Conference	II
Concord	Mountain Lions	Athens	WV	Independent	II
Davenport	Panthers	Grand Rapids	MI	Great Lakes Valley Conference	II
D'Youville	Saints	Buffalo	NY	Independent	II
East Stroudsburg	Warriors	East Stroudsburg	PA	Independent	II
Edinboro	Fighting Scots	Edinboro	PA	Independent	II
Emmanuel (GA)	Lions	Franklin Springs	GA	Conference Carolinas	II
Emory & Henry	Wasps	Emory	VA	Conference Carolinas	II
Fairmont State	Fighting Falcons	Fairmont	WV	Independent	II
Felician	Golden Falcons	New Jersey	NJ	Independent	II
Ferrum	Panthers	Ferrum	VA	Conference Carolinas	II
Fort Hays State	Tigers	Hays	KS	Independent	II
Frostburg State	Bobcats	Frostburg	MD	Independent	II
Gannon	Golden Knights	Erie	PA	Independent	II
Grand Valley State	Lakers	Allendale	MI	Great Lakes Valley Conference	II
Jamestown	Jimmies	Jamestown	ND	Independent	II
King	Tornado	Bristol	TN	Conference Carolinas	II
Lincoln Memorial	Railspliters	Harrogate	TN	Conference Carolinas	II
Lock Haven	Bald Eagles	Lock Haven	PA	Independent	II
McKendree	Bearcats	Lebanon	IL	Great Lakes Valley Conference	II
Menlo	Oaks	Atherton	CA	Mountain Pacific Sports Federation	II
Minot State	Beavers	Minot	ND	Independent	II
Mount Olive	Trojans	Mount Olive	NC	Conference Carolinas	II
Newberry	Wolves	Newberry	SC	Conference Carolinas	II
Northern Michigan	Wildcats	Marquette	MI	Great Lakes Valley Conference	II
Northeastern State	RiverHawks	Tahlequah	OK	Independent	II
Pitt–Johnstown	Mountain Cats	Johnstown	PA	Independent	II
Point Park	Pioneers	Pittsburgh	PA	Independent	II
Quincy	Hawks	Quincy	IL	Great Lakes Valley Conference	II
Simon Fraser	Red Leafs	Burnaby	BC	Rocky Mountain Athletic Conference (Note: Simon Fraser plans to leave the NCAA and rejoin Canada's governing body of U Sports in 2027.)	II
Sioux Falls	Cougars	Sioux Falls	SD	Independent	II
Texas Woman's	Pioneers	Denton	TX	Rocky Mountain Athletic Conference	II
Tiffin	Dragons	Tiffin	OH	Independent	II
Upper Iowa	Peacocks	Fayette	IA	Great Lakes Valley Conference	II
Vanguard	Lions	Costa Mesa	CA	Mountain Pacific Sports Federation	II
West Liberty	Hilltoppers	West Liberty	WV	Independent	II
Western Colorado	Mountaineers	Gunnison	CO	Rocky Mountain Athletic Conference	II
Wheeling	Cardinals	Wheeling	WV	Independent	II
William Jewell	Cardinals	Liberty	MO	Great Lakes Valley Conference	II
Adrian	Bulldogs	Adrian	MI	Independent	III
Albion	Britons	Albion	MI	Independent	III
Alfred State	Pioneers	Alfred	NY	Allegheny Mountain Collegiate Conference	III
Alma	Scots	Alma	MI	Independent	III
Alvernia	Golden Wolves	Reading	PA	Middle Atlantic Conference	III
Arcadia	Knights	Glenside	PA	Middle Atlantic Conference	III
Augsburg	Auggies	Minneapolis	MN	Independent	III
Augustana (IL)	Vikings	Rock Island	IL	College Conference of Illinois and Wisconsin	III
Aurora	Spartans	Aurora	IL	College Conference of Illinois and Wisconsin	III
Baldwin Wallace	Yellow Jackets	Berea	OH	Independent	III
Bethany (WV)	Bison	Bethany	WV	Independent	III
Buena Vista	Beavers	Storm Lake	IA	American Rivers Conference	III
Buffalo State	Bengals	Buffalo	NY	Allegheny Mountain Collegiate Conference	III
Carthage	Firebirds	Kenosha	WI	College Conference of Illinois and Wisconsin	III
Cedar Crest	Falcons	Allentown	PA	Independent	III
Concordia	Falcons	Mequon	WI	College Conference of Illinois and Wisconsin	III
Centenary (NJ)	Cyclones	Hackettstown	NJ	Independent	III
Central (IA)	Dutch	Pella	IA	American Rivers Conference	III
Chatham	Cougars	Pittsburgh	PA	Independent	III
Coe	Kohawks	Cedar Rapids	IA	American Rivers Conference	III
Cornell (IA)	Rams	Mount Vernon	IA	Independent	III
Delaware Valley	Aggies	Doylestown (Note: The campus has a Doylestown mailing address, but is divided between the separate jurisdictions of Doylestown Township and New Britain.)	PA	Middle Atlantic Conference	III
Dubuque	Spartans	Dubuque	IA	American Rivers Conference	III
Eastern	Eagles	St. Davids	PA	Middle Atlantic Conference	III
Elmhurst	Blue Jays	Elmhurst	IL	College Conference of Illinois and Wisconsin	III
Elmira	Soaring Eagles	Elmira	NY	Allegheny Mountain Collegiate Conference	III
Eureka	Red Devils	Eureka	IL	St. Louis Intercollegiate Athletic Conference	III
Gettysburg	Bullets	Gettysburg	PA	Independent	III
Greensboro	Pride	Greensboro	NC	Independent	III
Heidelberg	Student Princes	Tiffin	OH	Independent	III
Hiram	Terriers	Hiram	OH	Allegheny Mountain Collegiate Conference	III
Huntingdon	Hawks	Montgomery	AL	St. Louis Intercollegiate Athletic Conference	III
Illinois Wesleyan	Titans	Bloomington	IL	College Conference of Illinois and Wisconsin	III
Ithaca	Bombers	Ithaca	NY	Independent	III
John Carroll	Blue Streaks	University Heights	OH	Allegheny Mountain Collegiate Conference	III
Kean	Cougars	Union	NJ	Independent	III
Keystone	Giants	La Plume	PA	Independent	III
Lakeland	Muskies	Herman (Note: The main campus has a Plymouth mailing address.)	WI	Independent	III
Linfield	Wildcats	McMinnville	OR	Independent	III
Loras	Duhawks	Dubuque	IA	American Rivers Conference	III
Luther (IA)	Norse	Decorah	IA	American Rivers Conference	III
Lyon	Scots	Batesville	AR	St. Louis Intercollegiate Athletic Conference	III
Maine Maritime	Mariners	Castine	ME	Independent	III
Manchester	Spartans	North Manchester	IN	Independent	III
Marymount	Saints	Arlington	VA	Independent	III
McDaniel	Green Terror	Westminster	MD	Independent	III
McMurry	War Hawks	Abilene	TX	St. Louis Intercollegiate Athletic Conference	III
Millikin	Big Blue	Decatur	IL	College Conference of Illinois and Wisconsin	III
Misericordia	Cougars	Dallas	PA	Middle Atlantic Conference	III
Mount St. Joseph	Lions	Delhi Township (Note: The campus has a Cincinnati mailing address.)	OH	Independent	III
Mount Union	Purple Raiders	Alliance	OH	Independent	III
MSOE	Raiders	Milwaukee	WI	College Conference of Illinois and Wisconsin	III
Muhlenberg	Mules	Allentown	PA	Independent	III
New England College	Pilgrims	Henniker	NH	New England Wrestling Association	III
North Central (IL)	Cardinals	Naperville	IL	College Conference of Illinois and Wisconsin	III
Norwich	Cadets	Northfield	VT	New England Wrestling Association	III
Otterbein	Cardinals	Westerville	OH	Independent	III
Pacific (OR)	Boxers	Forest Grove	OR	Independent	III
Penn State Altoona	Lions	Logan Township (Note: The campus has an Altoona mailing address.)	PA	Allegheny Mountain Collegiate Conference	III
Randolph	WildCats	Lynchburg	VA	Independent	III
Schreiner	Mountaineers	Kerrville	TX	St. Louis Intercollegiate Athletic Conference	III
Simpson	Storm	Indianola	IA	American Rivers Conference	III
Southern Virginia	Knights	Buena Vista	VA	Independent	III
Trine	Thunder	Angola	IN	Independent	III
Ursinus	Bears	Collegeville	PA	Independent	III
Utica	Pioneers	Utica	NY	Independent	III
Wartburg	Knights	Waverly	IA	American Rivers Conference	III
Waynesburg	Yellow Jackets	Waynesburg	PA	Independent	III
Western New England	Golden Bears	Springfield	MA	Independent	III
Westminster (MO)	Blue Jays	Fulton	MO	St. Louis Intercollegiate Athletic Conference	III
Wilkes	Colonials	Wilkes-Barre	PA	Independent	III
Wisconsin–Oshkosh	Titans	Oshkosh	WI	Independent	III
Wisconsin–Stevens Point	Pointers	Stevens Point	WI	Independent	III
Wittenberg	Tigers	Springfield	OH	Independent	III
York (PA)	Spartans	Spring Garden Township (Note: The campus has a York mailing address.)	PA	Middle Atlantic Conference	III

== Future teams ==
In addition to those listed above, six schools are known to be adding women's wrestling in 2027–28 and one more in 2028–29.

Institution	Teams	Location	State	Conference	Div.	First season
Columbia	Lions	New York	NY	TBA	I	2027–28
Iowa State	Cyclones	Ames	IA	TBA	I	2027–28
Juniata	Eagles	Huntingdon	PA	TBA	III	2027–28
Kent State	Golden Flashes	Kent	OH	TBA	I	2027–28
Lackawanna	Falcons	Scranton	PA	TBA	II	2027–28
Olivet	Comets	Olivet	MI	TBA	III	2027–28 (Note: According to Olivet's press release, women's wrestling will compete as a club sport in 2026–27, with full varsity competition planned to start in 2027–28.)
Texas Wesleyan	Rams	Fort Worth	TX	TBA	II	2028–29
