= VMI Keydets wrestling =

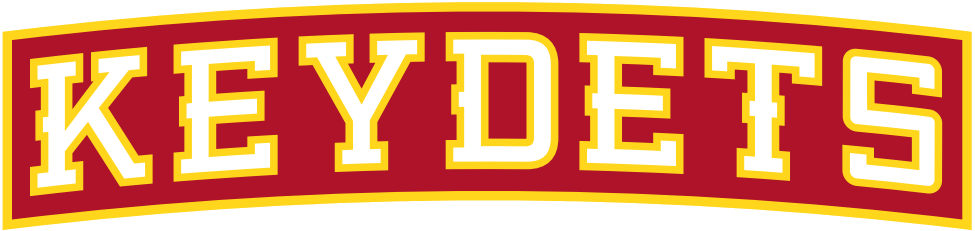
- University: Virginia Military Institute
- Head coach: Jim Gibson (2 seasons season)
- Conference: SoCon
- Location: Lexington, VA
- Arena: Cocke Hall (capacity: 1,200)
- Nickname: Keydets
- Colors: Red, white, and yellow

All-Americans
- 3

Conference championships
- 113 (individual)

Conference Tournament championships
- 1930, 1935, 1938, 1943, 1951, 1957, 1985, 1995, 1997

The VMI Keydets wrestling team began in 1921 and represents the Virginia Military Institute of Lexington, Virginia (VMI) as a member of the Southern Conference (SoCon) of NCAA Division I wrestling. The squad is coached by Jim Gibson.

== History ==
The VMI wrestling team has had three wrestlers earn All-American honors. Warren Landis was a national runner-up at 155-lbs in 1933. Charlie Branch finished in fourth place at 142-lbs at the 1994 NCAA Division I Wrestling Championships, becoming the school's second wrestling All-American. Branch later served as the head coach of the Eastern Michigan Eagles wrestling team. Leslie Apedoe, a native of Ghana, became an All-American by placing sixth at heavyweight at the 1999 NCAA Championships. VMI wrestling has won nine conference tournament championships in their team's history.
