= Drexel Dragons wrestling =

- Founded: 1947–48; 79 years ago
- University: Drexel University
- Head coach: Matt Azevedo (15th season)
- Assistant coach: Mauro Correnti, Chad Walsh
- Conference: EIWA
- Location: Philadelphia, PA
- Arena: Daskalakis Athletic Center
- Nickname: Dragons
- Colors: Navy blue and gold
- Fight song: Drexel Fight Song

All-Americans
- 2

Conference championships
- 34 Individual Champions

Conference Tournament championships
- 1985

The Drexel Dragons wrestling team represents collegiate wrestling at Drexel University. The team currently competes in the Eastern Intercollegiate Wrestling Association in Division I of the National Collegiate Athletic Association (NCAA) and hold home matches at the Daskalakis Athletic Center in Philadelphia, Pennsylvania.

== History ==
Drexel's primary conference, the Coastal Athletic Association (CAA), sponsored wrestling until 2013. Conference realignment and movement by other CAA teams ended CAA sponsorship of wrestling. Since 2014 Drexel has competed in Eastern Intercollegiate Wrestling Association.

Drexel has two NCAA All-Americans to its credit: Rob Rebmann in 2004 and Ryan Hluschak in 2007.
