= Binghamton Bearcats wrestling =

Binghamton Bearcats
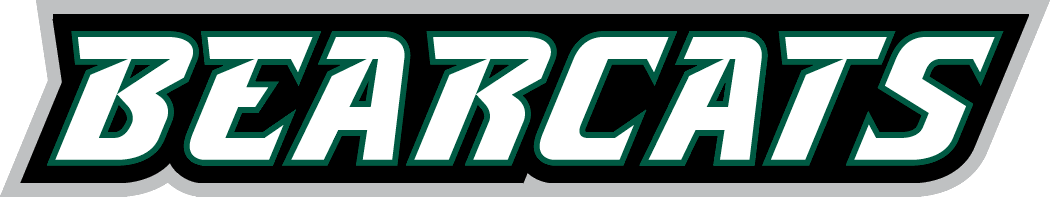
- University: Binghamton University
- Head coach: Kyle Borshoff (3rd season)
- Conference: EIWA
- Location: Vestal, NY
- Arena: West Gym (capacity: 1,135)
- Nickname: Bearcats
- Colors: Dark green, white, and black

Conference Tournament championships
- 2010 (CAA)

The Binghamton Bearcats wrestling team represents Binghamton University of Vestal, New York. The Bearcats compete in the Eastern Intercollegiate Wrestling Association (EIWA) and are coached by Kyle Borshoff.

== History ==
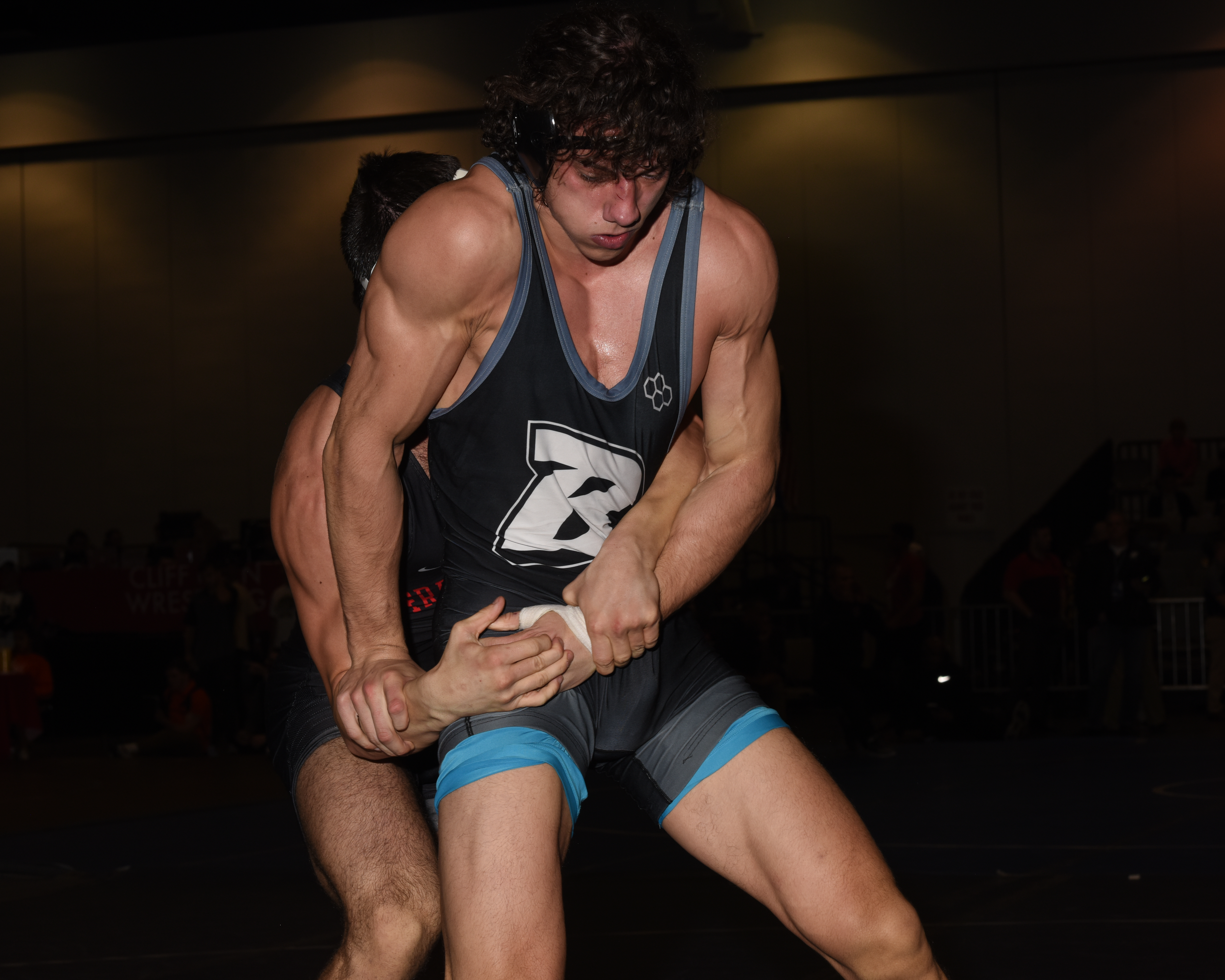
A Binghamton wrestling match in 2017

Binghamton has fielded a college wrestling team since 1969. The team competed on the NCAA Division III level until 1998. The Bearcats moved to Division II in 1999 and Division I in 2002. The wrestling team joined the Eastern Intercollegiate Wrestling Association in July 2013. Previously, it had been an associate member of the Colonial Athletic Association, but conference realignment led the CAA to drop the sport. The rest of Binghamton's intercollegiate teams, except golf, are members of the America East Conference. The Bearcats have had four All-American wrestlers (Josh Patterson 7th, Justin Lister 4th, Nick Gwiazdowski 8th, Donald Vinson 3rd) since joining Division I and had 25 All-Americans in Divisions II and III.

The squad was coached by Pat Popolizio, a former wrestler for the Oklahoma State Cowboys, who left in 2012 to take the head wrestling coach position at North Carolina State University. Popolizio was succeeded by Matt Dernlan who had been the head coach of the Clarion Golden Eagles.

In December 2017, Dernlan resigned as head coach. Kyle Borshoff, a two-time All-American at American University, was named head coach.
