= American Eagles wrestling =

American Eagles
- University: American University
- Head coach: Jason Borelli (5th season)
- Assistant coach: Alex Tirapelle and Joey Dance
- Conference: EIWA
- Location: Washington, D.C.
- Arena: Bender Arena (capacity: 3,044)
- Nickname: Eagles
- Colors: Blue, white, and red

The American Eagles men's wrestling team represents American University in Washington, D.C. in NCAA Division I wrestling. The school's team competes in the Eastern Intercollegiate Wrestling Association (EIWA). Their home matches are held in Bender Arena. The school has had one national champion wrestler, with wrestlers having earned 18 NCAA Division I All-American honors.

== History ==
=== Mark Cody era (2001–2011) ===
When Mark Cody began coaching at American, he transformed an almost extinct team into a nationally ranked team. While at the helm, the Eagles were able to gain a National Champion and 14 All-Americans.

In 2004–05, Daniel Waters received All-American status by placing 8th at Nationals, becoming the first wrestler in AU history to gain that honor.

In 2005–06, Muzaffar Abdurakhmanov placed 3rd at Nationals while Josh Glenn placed 6th. It was the first time AU had two All-Americans in the same year and the first time in AU wrestling history that American broke the Top 20 at Nationals with a 17th-place finish.

In 2006–07, Josh Glenn beat Kurt Backes from Iowa State 6-4 in the NCAA Finals. Glenn became not only the first AU wrestler to win nationals, but the first AU athlete to win a National Title.

In 2007–08, Josh Glenn took 4th place at Nationals, becoming the first 3X All-American in American University Wrestling history. In addition, Michael Cannon placed 6th at Nationals.

In 2008–09, Michael Cannon placed 8th at Nationals, earning the honor a second time. In addition, Kyle Borshoff placed 7th.

In 2009–10, for the first time in AU wrestling history, the Eagles had three All-Americans in the same year. Michael Cannon placed 3rd at Nationals, becoming the 2nd wrestler to earn 3 All-American titles. Kyle Borshoff placed 8th at Nationals, earning his 2nd All-American title in his career. Finally, Steve Fittery placed 5th at Nationals. The Eagles also placed 14th in the nation.

In 2010–11, the American University Wrestling team not only broke multiple records, but also did the best they ever did at Nationals. Ganbayar Sanjaa placed 4th at Nationals, earning his 1st All-American title. Steve Fittery placed 3rd at Nationals, earning his 2nd All-American title in his career. Fittery also only lost one match that year. Finally, Ryan Flores became the 2nd wrestler in AU history to make it to the NCAA Finals. Unfortunately, Flores lost to Zach Rey of Lehigh 1-0. Team wise, American University placed 5th, behind Penn State, Cornell, Iowa, and Oklahoma State. This is still the best finish in school history. Mark Cody earned National Coach of the Year, the first time he has ever earned it in his career.

Following the 2011 season, Mark Cody took the head coaching job at the University of Oklahoma.

=== Teague Moore era (2011–2021) ===
In 2011–12, Teague Moore took over the team. Kyle Borshoff stepped up from volunteer assistant coach to 1st assistant coach. Pete Friedl, 3X All-American of Illinois, become the 2nd Assistant coach. Moore helped lead the eagles to a 19th-place finish at the NCAAs. Moore also led the Eagles to a 3rd-place finish at the EIWA's, the highest finish AU has accomplished ever. Moore was fired in January 2021 and former Eagles wrestler Jason Grimes was his interim replacement. American did not compete during the regular season.

=== Jason Borelli era (2021-present) ===
In April 2021, American named Jason Borelli as its new head coach. Borelli previously coached Stanford for 13 years until 2021.

In his fourth season, Borelli coached Caleb Campos to a fourth place finish at the NCAA Championship. Campos was Borelli’s first All-American during his tenure and AU’s first since 2016. The Eagles finished 23rd in the nation, marking the first top 25 finish since the Mark Cody era.

== Achievements ==
=== Individual ===
Category	Amount	Individual (year)
NCAA Champion	1	*Josh Glenn (2007)
NCAA All-Americans	18	*Daniel Waters (2005), *Muzaffar Abdurakhmanov (2006), *Josh Glenn (2006–08), *Michael Cannon (2008–10), *Kyle Borshoff (2009–10), *Steve Fittery (2010–11), *Ganbayar Sanjaa (2011–12), *Ryan Flores (2011–12) *David Terao (2015-2016) *Caleb Campos (2025-2026)
NCAA Academic All-American	21	*David Lombardy (1998), *Daniel Waters (2005), *Muzaffar Abdurakhmanov (2006), *Matt Morkel (2006), *Michael Cannon (2007, 2008, 2009, 2010), *Damian Swielik (2007), *Jason Borshoff (2008, 2010), *Josh Glenn (2008), *Christopher Stout (2008), *Andrew Silber (2009), *Steve Fittery (2010, 2011), *Bubby Graham (2011), *Ryan Flores (2011–12), *Ganbayar Sanjaa (2011), *Matt Mariacher (2011–12), *Thomas Williams (2012); *Danny Mitchell (2011–12); *Kevin Tao (2012)
NCAA Qualifiers	62	*Rob Ferrara (1973); *Loren Danielson (1979); *Chuck Toler (1985); *Makr Shuffin (1989); *Chris Toth (1989–90); *Malone Chase (1993–94); *Rob Hjerling (1993–94); *Jacob Scott (1994–95); *Bret Ruth (1996–97); *Rob Chavez (1997); *Rob Puzio (1997–98); *Matt Esposito (1998–99); *Josh Schroeder (1999); *Marc Hoffer (1999, 2001–02); *Denis Alamplav (2000–01); *Ryan Palinger (2001); *Wille Harris (2002); *Daniel Waters (2005); *Muzaffar Abdurakhmanov (2005–06); *Adam LoPiccolo (2005–06); *Josh Glenn (2005–08); *Kyle Borshoff (2007, 2009–10); *Mike Cannon (2007–10); *Rudy Rueda (2007); *Jason Borshoff (2008); *Chris Stout (2008); *Andrew Silber (2009); *Jordan Lipp (2010); *Steve Fittery (2010–11); *Patrick Graham (2011); *Matt Mariacher (2011–12); *Ryan Flores (2011–12); *Ganbayar Sanjaa (2011–12); *Daniel Mitchell (2010–12); *Kevin Tao (2012–13); *Blake Herrin (2013); *David Terao (2013)
EIWA Champions	12	*Muzaffar Abdurakhmanov (2005–06), *Josh Glenn (2006–08), *Michael Cannon (2009–10), *Steve Fittery (2011), *Matt Mariacher (2011–12), *Ryan Flores (2011–12) *Caleb Campos (2025-2026)
Midlands Champions	3	*Josh Glenn (2007), *Michael Cannon (2008), *Steve Fittery (2009/2011)
NWCA All-Star Classic Invitation	5	*Mark Hoffer (2001); *Kyle Borshoff (2009); *Ryan Flores (2010); *Ganbayar Sanjaa (2011); *Ryan Flores (2011) * Kevin Tao (2012)
National Coach of the Year	1	*Mark Cody (2011)
Elite 89	1	*Danny Mitchell (2012)
EIWA Wrestler of the Year	1	Josh Glenn (2007)
EIWA Most Outstanding Wrestler	1	Muzaffar Abdurakhmanov (2006)
EIWA Fletcher Award	1	Josh Glenn (2008)
EIWA Freshman of the Year	1	Josh Glenn (2005)
EIWA Billy Sheridan Memorial Award	1	Ryan Flores (2012)
AU Senior Student-Athlete of the Year	7	*Brian Sulmonatti (1979); *Jacob Scott (1995); *Matt Esposito (1999); *Josh Glenn (2008); *Mike Cannon (2010); *Steve Fittery (2011); *Ryan Flores (2012)

=== Team ===
Category	Times	Year (place)
NCAA Top 5 Finish	1	2011 (5th)
NCAA Top 20 Finish	3	2006 (17th), 2007 (17th), 2010 (14th), 2011 (5th), 2012 (19th)
Champions of the Classroom	2	2007–08, 2008–09

=== Individual records ===
Category	Record Holder (Total)[Year]	2nd Highest (Total)[Year]	3rd Highest (Total)[Year]	Current Wrestlers (Total)
Career Wins	Marc Hoffer (125)[1997-02]	Michael Cannon (122)[2006–10]	Josh Glenn (110)[2004–08]	XXXX
Single Season Wins	Josh Glenn (35)[2005–06]	Kyle Borshoff (33)[2008–09], Michael Cannon (33)[2008–09], Steve Fittery (33)[2010–11], Matt Mariacher(33)[2010–11], Daniel Mitchell (33)[2010–11]	Daniel Waters (32)[2003–04]	XXX
Career Dual Meet Wins	Michael Cannon (64)[2006–10]	Josh Glenn (55)[2004–08]	Kyle Borshoff (53)[2006–10]	XXX
Single Season Dual Meet Wins	Steve Fittery (20) [2010–11]	Josh Glenn (18) [2005–06]	Michael Cannon (17) [2007–08 & 2008–09], Ganbayar Sanjaa (17)[2010–11]	XXXXX
Career Falls	Josh Glenn (44)[2004–08]	Ryan Flores (27) [2010–12]	Michael Cannon (26)[2006–10]	CURRENT WRESTLERS WILL BE SHOWN AFTER FIRST MATCH
Single Season Falls	Josh Glenn (21)[2005–06]	Ryan Flores (17)[2011–12]	Steve Fittery (14)[2010–11]	XXX
Career Major Decisions	Michael Cannon (26)[2006–10]	Steve Fittery (19)[2009–11] Matt Mariacher (19) [2008–12]	Josh Glenn (18)[2004–08]	XXXX
Single Season Major Decisions	Steve Fittery (14)[2009–10]	Chris Stout (11)[2007–08]	Michael Cannon (9)[2008–09 & 2009–10]	XXX
Career Tech-Falls	Steve Fittery (13)[2009–11]	Michael Cannon (12)[2006–10]	Josh Glenn (10)[2004–08]	CURRENT WRESTLERS WILL BE SHOWN AFTER FIRST MATCH
Single Season Tech-Falls	Steve Fittery (7)[2010–11]	Steve Fittery (6)[2009–10]	Josh Glenn (5)[2004–05], Nick Arujau (5)[2010–11]	XXX

Italicized: Current AU Wrestlers
