= Mid-Atlantic Rifle Conference =

- Association: NCAA
- Founded: 1978
- Commissioner: Dr. Bailey Urbach, President
- Sports fielded: Rifle
- Division: III
- No. of teams: 5 NCAA, 4 club level
- Most recent champion: Mount Aloysius College (2026)
- Website: http://www.midatlanticrifle.org/

The Mid-Atlantic Rifle Conference (MAC) is a National Collegiate Athletic Association (NCAA) rifle-only conference. The MAC was established in 1978 for schools that sponsor NCAA sanctioned varsity rifle teams, but do not have rifle as a sponsored sport in their primary conferences, as well as for non-NCAA sanctioned collegiate club teams.

== Members ==
=== Current members ===
Institution	Location	Founded	Enrollment	Nickname	Primary conference
NCAA-sanctioned varsity teams
John Jay	New York, NY	1964	16,000+	Bloodhounds	City University of New York Athletic Conference (Div. III)
MIT	Cambridge, MA	1861	10,894	Engineers	New England Women's and Men's Athletic Conference (Div. III)
Schreiner University	Kerrville, TX	1923	1,308	Mountaineers	Southern Collegiate Athletic Conference (Div. III)
Norwich University	Northfield, VT	1819	2,100+	Cadets	New England Women's and Men's Athletic Conference (Div. III)
Mount Aloysius College	Cresson, PA	1853	1,097	Mounties	Allegheny Mountain Collegiate Conference (Div. III)
University club teams
Coast Guard	New London, CT	1876	1,045	Bears	New England Women's and Men's Athletic Conference (Div. III)
University of Rhode Island	Kingston, RI	1892	18,061	Rams	Atlantic 10 Conference (Div. I)
SUNY Maritime	Throggs Neck, NY	1874	1,850	Privateers	Skyline Conference (Div. III)
Hillsdale College	Hillsdale, MI	1844	1,573	Chargers	Great Midwest Athletic Conference (Div. II)
Indiana Tech	Fort Wayne, IN	1930	9,652	Warriors	Wolverine–Hoosier Athletic Conference (NAIA)

=== Former members ===
Former members include:

- Akron
- Appalachian State
- Army
- Brandeis
- Columbia
- Cornell
- DePaul
- Drexel
- Duquesne
- Indiana (PA)
- Johns Hopkins
- Kings College
- Kutztown
- Lehigh University
- Loyola (Maryland)
- Mass Maritime
- Merchant Marine Academy
- Navy
- University of the Sciences in Philadelphia
- NJIT
- Penn
- Penn State
- Princeton
- St. John's
- SUNY Plattsburgh
- Trinity College
- VMI
- Various ROTC teams from member schools
- Wentworth Tech
- Yale University

== Champions ==
From 1989 - 2022, the conference sponsored championship titles in multiple competitive divisions based on score classification. From 2023 - present, one title is awarded per event and overall amongst all member institutions.

== See also ==
- List of NCAA rifle programs
- NCAA Rifle Championship
