= Lehigh Mountain Hawks =

Athletic teams of Lehigh University

- University: Lehigh University
- Nickname: Mountain Hawks
- NCAA: Division I (FCS)
- Conference: Patriot League (primary); EIWA (wrestling); MARC (men's rowing)
- Athletic director: Jeremy L. Gibson
- Location: Bethlehem, Pennsylvania, U.S.
- Varsity teams: 23
- Football stadium: Goodman Stadium
- Basketball arena: Stabler Arena
- Baseball stadium: J. David Walker Field at Legacy Park
- Softball stadium: Leadership Park
- Soccer stadium: Ulrich Sports Complex
- Volleyball arena: Leeman-Turner Arena At Grace Hall
- Other venues: List: Frank Banko Field; Goodman Campus Cross Country Course; Goodman Track and Field Complex; Jacobs Pool; Leeman-Turner Arena at Grace Hall; Lewis Indoor Tennis Center/Ulrich Varsity Tennis Courts; Rauch Fieldhouse; Saucon Valley Country Club; Steiner/Steinberg Boathouse
- Colors: Brown and white
- Mascot: Clutch
- Website: lehighsports.com

The Lehigh Mountain Hawks are the athletic teams representing Lehigh University in Bethlehem, Pennsylvania. The Hawks participate in NCAA Division I competition as a member of the Patriot League. In football, Lehigh competes in the Division I Football Championship Subdivision (FCS).

== History ==
=== 19th century ===
The athletic teams at Lehigh University were founded in 1865. They were known as the Engineers until the 1995–96 academic year. Some believe that this nickname was a reference to the Lehigh Valley Railroad, not to the school's academic engineering program.

=== 20th century ===
There was a logo of a giant Lehigh Engineer looking through a surveyor's transit while an airliner flew over him and a diesel passenger train steamed beneath his feet in use at Lehigh during the 1950s and 1960s. As the university expanded following the advent of coeducation in 1971, while the number of engineering students remained steady, the percentage of students enrolled in engineering declined from 50% to about 30%. As a result, during the school's 1988 appearance in the men's NCAA basketball tournament, TV commentators were encouraged to refer to the school by its colors, Brown and White.

Beginning in the 1980s and until 1995, the team used a logo of a train locomotive with an "L" on the front. In November 1995, the school introduced the Mountain Hawk as a mascot, replacing the "L train", which stemmed from a student-based movement to come up with a suitable mascot; the Mountain Hawk was officially voted in as the new mascot by the Lehigh Student Senate soon after. Controversy arose the following year, when the school's nickname was changed to the Mountain Hawks. Many alumni and students, including various members of Lehigh's Marching 97, still object, though the school's athletes were cited as being strong supporters of this change.

=== 21st century ===
The university lists all three nicknames, Engineers, Brown & White, and Mountain Hawks, in its media guides. In November 2008, just before the 144th game against Lafayette, the mascot was given the name "Clutch." The name was chosen after a long contest of name suggestions and voting.

== Rivalries ==
Lehigh is especially known for its football rivalry with Lafayette College, the most frequently-played matchup in college football history. Known as The Rivalry, as of 2023 both teams have met 159 times.

== Sponsored sports ==
Men's sports	Women's sports
Baseball	Basketball
Basketball	Cross Country
Cross Country	Field hockey
Football	Golf
Golf	Lacrosse
Lacrosse	Rowing
Rowing	Soccer
Soccer	Softball
Swimming & Diving	Swimming & Diving
Tennis	Tennis
Track & field^{†}	Track & field^{†}
Wrestling	Volleyball
† – Track and field includes both indoor and outdoor.

=== Baseball and softball ===
Lehigh has very successful programs in both baseball (men) and softball (women), having won both Patriot League titles in 2015 and advancing to the NCAA playoffs. More recently, the Lehigh softball team won the 2022 Patriot League Softball Tournament and advanced to the Washington regional in the NCAA Tournament.

=== Basketball ===
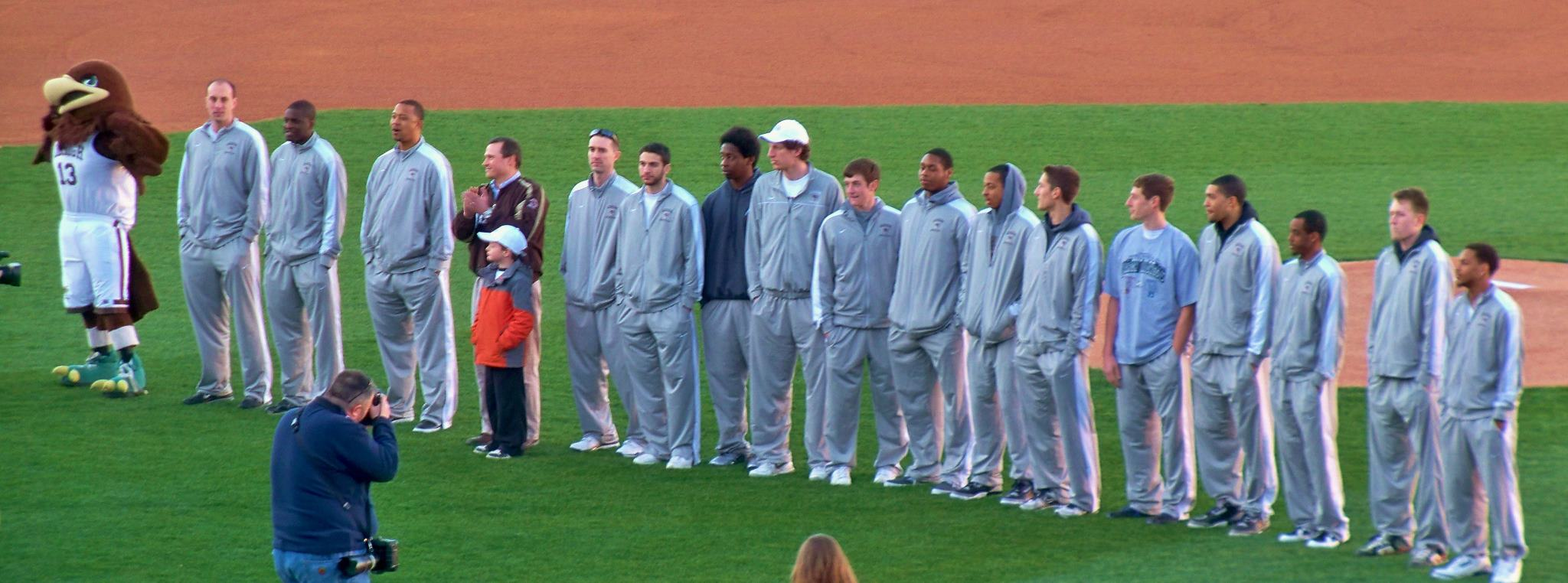
The 2011–12 Lehigh men's basketball team

Lehigh is also competitive in men's and women's basketball. Both teams play in Stabler Arena. The men's and women's teams both won the Patriot League championship in 2010. The Men's team went on to the NCAA Tournament, losing in the first round to top-ranked University of Kansas.

The Mountain Hawks men's basketball team is best known for its first-round game in the 2012 NCAA Men's Division I Basketball Tournament as a #15 seed on March 16, 2012 against the #2 seed Duke Blue Devils. Despite being a heavy underdog, due in large part to future NBA player CJ McCollum's 30-point game, the Mountain Hawks defeated Duke 75–70 making it only the sixth time that a 15th seed has defeated a 2nd seed.

=== Football ===
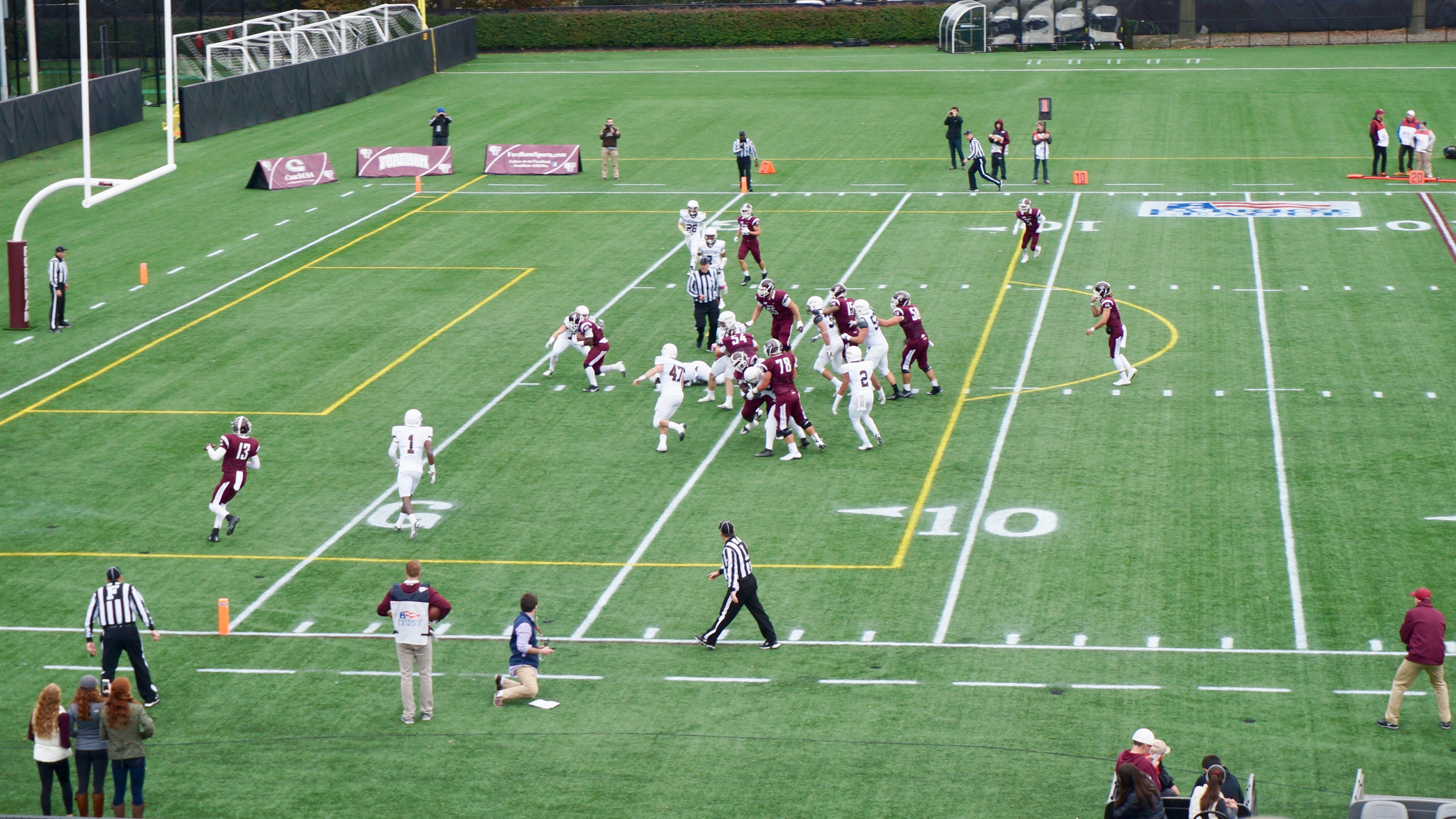
Lehigh v Fordham game in 2015

The varsity football team competes at the Division I FCS level. Lehigh won the 1977 Division II National Championship by defeating Jacksonville State 33–0 in the Pioneer Bowl. The Engineers were 1979 1-AA National Runners-up after falling to Eastern Kentucky in the title game. Lehigh has ten Patriot League championships, which is the most amongst league members. The program has also enjoyed seven FCS playoff appearances: 1980, 1998, 1999, 2000, 2001, 2004, 2010 and 2011.

Lehigh is also part of the most played rivalry in college football. The Mountain Hawks have met the Lafayette Leopards 159 times. Lafayette leads the all-time series 82–72–5. The game is traditionally played on the Saturday before Thanksgiving.

Football games are held at Goodman Stadium, which has been recognized as the "Best Game Day Atmosphere in the Patriot League." Tailgate parties are a big part of the experience, attracting many students and alumni who attend the games.

In the Lehigh Mountain Hawks 2016 football season they finished with 9 wins and 3 losses, and made the playoffs for the first time since 2011. They went undefeated in the Patriot League winning all 6 games, while winning 3 games and losing 2 games against out of conference opponents. They played the University of New Hampshire in the first round of the 2016 FCS playoffs, where they lost 21 to 64.

The senior captains for the 2016 season were quarterback Nick Shafnisky, linebacker Colton Caslow, offensive center Brandon Short, and offensive tackle Zach Duffy.

After the 2016 season, Nick Shafnisky was named Patriot League Offensive Player of the Year and Lehigh football Head Coach Andy Coen was named Patriot League Coach of the Year. Lehigh also received nine first team honors for senior quarterback Nick Shafnisky, sophomore running back Dom Bragalone, junior wide receiver and return specialist Gatlin Casey, junior wide receiver Troy Pelletier, senior offensive tackle Zach Duffy, sophomore place kicker and punter Ed Mish, and senior linebacker Colton Caslow. Lehigh also earned four second team honors for junior offensive tackle Tim O'Hara, senior offensive tackle Brandon Short, junior defensive lineman Tyler Cavenas, and senior defensive back Brandon Leaks.

In the upcoming 2017 football season the Lehigh Mountain Hawks will be looking towards defending their 2016 Patriot League Championship, and hope to repeat. Lehigh will kick off their season with a home game against Villanova. They have dropped Princeton from their schedule and will be facing Wagner instead for their fifth game of the season.

=== Lacrosse ===
Lehigh's lacrosse team competes in the nine-team Patriot League. The Mountain Hawks have a strong tradition in lacrosse, but have only appeared twice (2012, 2013) in the present NCAA championships since its formation in 1971. Lehigh has accumulated seven national lacrosse titles under the former USILA national title format and strongly contributed to the growth of lacrosse in Pennsylvania.

=== Soccer ===
Lehigh men's and women's soccer are NCAA Division I programs that compete in the Patriot League. Both teams are highly competitive. The 2006 men's team had a 15–2–3 overall record and became the first Patriot League team to go a perfect 7–0 in league play. They advanced to the third round of the NCAA play-offs before losing to the number-one seed. Both teams are sponsored by Nike as well.

The head coach of the men's team is Dean Koski, and he is assisted by Ryan Hess and goalkeeper coach Matt Deming. This past season (2016), the Lehigh men's soccer team posted a 7–10–1. However, they won the Patriot League Championship in 2015, earning them an automatic berth to the NCAA tournament.

Leading the women's team is Eric Lambinus, assisted by Lauren Calabrese, Madi Morgan, and Bill Moukoulis. In their 2016 season, they went eight games without giving up a single goal, putting them at first in the country for goals against. They're overall record in that season was 11–5–2.

Both teams play on Ulrich Field, located in Ulrich Sports Complex on Goodman Campus at Lehigh University. The field is grass with stands that hold about 1,300 fans. Locker rooms and practice fields (Kauffman Fields) are located a short distance from the game field. There are three grass fields with an irrigation/sprinkler system to keep up maintenance.

Combined between the two teams, 24 student athletes made the Patriot League Honor Roll, having a 3.2 GPA or higher during the fall semester (Women: 15, Men: 9).

=== Tennis ===
Julius Seligson played collegiate tennis at Lehigh University, graduating in 1930. He never lost a regular season match. In 1928 he won the NCAA Men's Tennis Championship in singles, to become Lehigh's first individual national champion. He won 66 straight matches, before losing in the 1930 NCAA finals. He won the NCAA indoor singles championship in 1928, 1929, and 1930.

=== Wrestling ===
Lehigh's wrestling team competes in the EIWA and has a strong tradition in the sport dating back to 1910. Over its history, Lehigh has won 34 EIWA team championships and 203 Lehigh wrestlers have won EIWA individual championships. The team regularly places among the top 10 at the NCAA Division I Wrestling Championships and is considered one of the nation's best collegiate wrestling programs. In addition to its EIWA successes, Lehigh has had 28 national NCAA individual champions, 137 NCAA All-Americans, and 16 top five NCAA team finishes. Its last national champion was Darian Cruz in 2017.

Among Lehigh wrestling alumni are several coaches of the sport at other universities and colleges, including Jason Kutz (1998) at East Stroudsburg University, Chris Ayres (1999) at Princeton University, Cory Cooperman (2006), assistant wrestling coach at Rutgers University, and Troy Letters (2006) and Derek Zinck (2006), assistant wrestling coaches at Princeton. Bobby Weaver, a Lehigh wrestling alumnus, is a former won a gold medal in wrestling at the 1984 Summer Olympics.

In 2006, the wrestling team marked its fifth straight EIWA championship. In 2018, they won the EIWA championship again, snapping the 11-year streak of Cornell University, the team's biggest rival. Lehigh's current head wrestling coach is Pat Santoro, a Lehigh wrestling alumnus and former EIWA champion, and the team's home is Leeman-Turner Arena at Grace Hall, often referred to as "The Snakepit", with a capacity of 2,200.

Audrey Jimenez was awarded the 2026 Anthony-Maroulis Trophy for her successes in women's wrestling.

== Marching 97 ==
Lehigh's marching band is known as the "Marching 97". The number "97" represents the number of people who are in the marching band. It is composed of 12 ranks of 8 members and one drum major to conduct the entire band. The Marching 97 is known for its antics, silliness, and tradition in Lehigh University.

First created in 1906 under direction of E.E. Ross with only 15 men as a band. The band only grew from there and started to perform in halls such as Drown Hall and Carnegie Hall. The Marching 97 allowed women to join as cheerleaders in 1969. They were considered to be part of the band, but women were admitted as musicians in 1973.

In the 1970s, Professor Rich Aaronson asked if the Marching 97 could play in his Economics 001 class. The 97 enjoyed doing this and has taken requests for other classes. This is how the popular "Eco-flame" was created and it is done every year on the week Lehigh faces its rival, Lafayette College. Similar to the Eco-flame, if asked, the 97 will gather volunteering members to "flame" events on Lehigh. These events could be away football games, events organized by Lehigh, or Alums who ask to play at one of their events on Lehigh. The Marching 97 play at every home game and follow the football team whenever possible.

Today, the Marching 97 is entirely student-ran and is one of the country's only marching bands to do so. The band has performed at Carnegie Hall, Drown Hall, and at the New York World's Fair, as well as at Yankee Stadium in 2014 for the 150th meeting of the Lehigh-Lafayette game. In 2017, the Marching 97 was invited to march in London's New Year's Parade.
