= Davidson Wildcats wrestling =

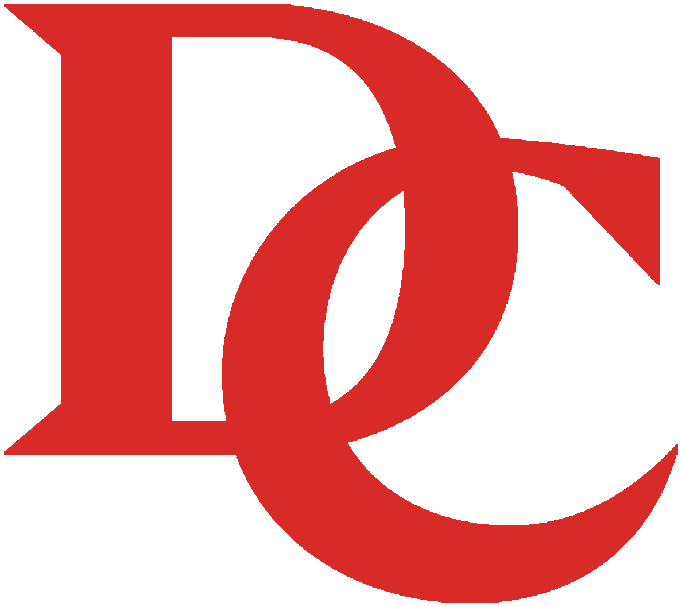
- University: Davidson College
- Head coach: Nate Carr Jr
- Conference: SoCon
- Location: Davidson, NC
- Arena: Belk Arena (capacity: 5,700)
- Nickname: Wildcats
- Colors: Red and black

The Davidson Wildcats wrestling team represents Davidson College of Davidson, North Carolina in NCAA Division I wrestling. The Wildcats are associate members of the Southern Conference since their primary conference, the Atlantic Ten Conference does not sponsor the sport.

The squad is coached by Nate Carr Jr. Ty Eustice (Iowa) is head assistant coach and Marcus Coleman (Iowa State) is an assistant coach.

The team has had eleven Southern Conference champions, including one in each year from 2013 to 2015. Davidson has never had an All-American wrestler at the NCAA Wrestling Championships.
