= Eastern Intercollegiate Wrestling Association =

American NCAA Division I conference

The Eastern Intercollegiate Wrestling Association (EIWA) is an NCAA Division I collegiate wrestling conference. It held its first championship tournament in 1905, making it the oldest wrestling conference in the NCAA. The EIWA's charter members were Columbia, Penn, Princeton, and Yale. Thirty-three different schools have been members of the EIWA during its history, all schools from the Eastern United States. Its current members are schools in the Northeast whose main conferences do not sponsor wrestling, including the Patriot League, America East Conference, Northeast Conference, Mid-Eastern Athletic Conference, and Coastal Athletic Association. Franklin & Marshall College is the only Division III school that competes in Division I wrestling.

== Current members ==
The EIWA currently has 12 members:

- American University
- United States Military Academy (Army)
- Binghamton University
- Bucknell University
- Drexel University
- Franklin and Marshall College
- Hofstra University
- Lehigh University
- Long Island University
- Morgan State University
- United States Naval Academy (Navy)
- Sacred Heart University

== Recent success and developments ==
At the 2011 NCAA Wrestling Championship, three EIWA teams placed in the top 10: Cornell placed 2nd, American University placed 5th, and Lehigh University placed 8th. In 2012, Cornell finished 4th and Lehigh 8th; Cornell was also 5th in 2013 and 7th in 2014.

In the same period, the EIWA had forty-four All-Americans; also, Kyle Dake of Cornell was awarded the Dan Hodge Trophy as national wrestler of the year and was named most outstanding wrestler of the NCAA tournament after becoming the first NCAA wrestler ever to win four national championships in four different weight classes in consecutive years.

In 2013, the EIWA absorbed Boston University, Hofstra, Drexel, and Binghamton after the Colonial Athletic Association ceased sponsorship of wrestling, making an 18-team conference for the 2013–14 season. The EIWA was reduced to 16 in 2014-15 with the departure of Rutgers to the Big Ten Conference and discontinuation of the BU program.

The most recent change in the EIWA membership was announced in April 2019. Long Island University announced that the wrestling team that had represented its Post campus in Division II would join the EIWA once the merger of the athletic programs of its Brooklyn and Post campuses took effect in July 2019. The renamed LIU Sharks joined NEC rival Sacred Heart, bringing the conference to seventeen members.

For the 2020–21 season, the EIWA had ten schools competing, as the six Ivy League schools and the Centennial Conference (which includes Franklin & Marshall) did not hold winter sports due to the COVID-19 pandemic.

On December 19, 2023, the six Ivy League members announced that they were leaving the EIWA to compete exclusively under the Ivy League banner starting in the 2024–25 season.

On September 19, 2024, Morgan State University, a program that resumed competition in 2023 after a 26-year hiatus and the lone Division I HBCU wrestling program, joined the EIWA. Morgan State is the first HBCU to join the EIWA.

== Former EIWA schools ==
School	How The Program Left
Boston University	Dropped Wrestling
Brown	Moved to Ivy League
Columbia	Moved to Ivy League
Cornell	Moved to Ivy League
Dartmouth	Dropped Wrestling
East Stroudsburg	Moved to Division II
Harvard	Moved to Ivy League
Penn	Moved to Ivy League
Penn State	Moved to the Eastern Wrestling League, and later to the Big Ten Conference
Pitt	Moved to the Eastern Wrestling League, and later the Atlantic Coast Conference
Princeton	Moved to Ivy League
Rutgers	Moved to the Big Ten Conference
Syracuse	Dropped Wrestling
Temple	Dropped Wrestling
US Coast Guard	Moved to Division III
US Merchant Marine	Moved to Division III
Virginia	Moved to the ACC
Wilkes	Moved to Division III
William & Mary	Dropped Wrestling
Yale	Dropped Wrestling

== League champions ==
Year	Host	Champion	Year	Host	Champion	Year	Host	Champion	Year	Host	Champion
1905	Penn	Yale	1942	Penn State	Penn State	1980	Lehigh	Lehigh	2019	Binghamton	Lehigh
1906	Columbia	Yale	1943	Penn	Navy	1981	Princeton	Syracuse	2020	Lehigh	Lehigh
1907	Princeton	Yale	1944	Lehigh	Navy	1982	Lehigh	Navy	2021	None	Lehigh
1908	Penn	Yale	1945	Lehigh	Navy	1983	Lehigh	Lehigh	2022	Cornell	Cornell
1909	Yale	Yale	1946	Lehigh	Navy	1984	Navy	Navy	2023	Penn	Cornell
1910	Penn	Cornell	1947	Yale	Lehigh	1985	F&M	Lehigh	2024	Bucknell	Cornell
1911	Princeton	Princeton	1948	Lehigh	Lehigh	1986	Lehigh	Navy	2025	Lehigh	Lehigh
1912	Columbia	Cornell	1949	Cornell	Syracuse	1987	Princeton	Army	2026	American	Lehigh
1913	Cornell	Cornell	1950	Princeton	Syracuse	1988	Syracuse	Lehigh	2027	Army	
1914	Penn	Cornell	1951	Penn State	Penn State	1989	Lehigh	Syracuse			
1915	Lehigh	Cornell	1952	Lehigh	Penn State	1990	Wilkes	Navy			
1916	Princeton	Cornell	1953	Princeton	Penn State	1991	Lehigh	Syracuse			
1917	Cornell	Cornell	1954	Cornell	Pitt	1992	Penn	Cornell			
1918	Columbia	Penn State	1955	Penn State	Pitt	1993	Lehigh	Cornell			
1919	Penn State	Penn State	1956	Lehigh	Pitt	1994	Cornell	Syracuse			
1920	Penn	Penn State	1957	Penn State	Penn State	1995	Navy	Lehigh			
1921	Princeton	Penn State	1958	Pitt	Cornell	1996	Syracuse	Penn			
1922	Lehigh	Cornell	1959	Cornell	Lehigh	1997	Penn	Penn			
1923	Cornell	Cornell	1960*	Princeton	Penn State	1998	Lehigh	Penn			
1924	Yale	Penn State			Pitt	1999	Army	Penn			
1925	Columbia	Penn State	1961	Lehigh	Lehigh	2000	Navy	Lehigh			
1926	Penn State	Cornell	1962	Penn State	Lehigh	2001	Penn	Harvard			
1927*	Penn	Lehigh	1963	Navy	Syracuse	2002	Lehigh	Lehigh			
		Yale	1964	F&M	Lehigh	2003	Cornell	Lehigh			
1928	Princeton	Lehigh	1965	Cornell	Syracuse	2004	Penn	Lehigh			
1929	Lehigh	Lehigh	1966	Pitt	Lehigh	2005	Navy	Lehigh			
1930	Cornell	Cornell	1967	Penn	Lehigh	2006	Lehigh	Lehigh			
1931	Yale	Lehigh	1968	Pitt	Navy	2007	East Stroudsburg	Cornell			
1932	Syracuse	Lehigh	1969	Princeton	Navy	2008	F&M	Cornell			
1933	Columbia	Lehigh	1970	Penn State	Navy	2009	Penn	Cornell			
1934	Penn State	Lehigh	1971	Navy	Penn State	2010	Lehigh	Cornell			
1935	Penn	Lehigh	1972	Temple	Navy	2011	Bucknell	Cornell			
1936	Princeton	Penn State	1973	Pitt	Penn State	2012	Princeton	Cornell			
1937	Lehigh	Penn State	1974	Navy	Navy	2013	Rutgers	Cornell			
1938	Cornell	Lehigh	1975	Navy	Lehigh	2014	Penn	Cornell			
1939	Yale	Lehigh	1976	F&M	Lehigh	2015	Lehigh	Cornell			
1940	Syracuse	Lehigh	1977	Syracuse	Lehigh	2016	Princeton	Cornell			
1941*	Columbia	Princeton	1978	Penn	Princeton	2017	Bucknell	Cornell			
		Yale	1979	Princeton	Lehigh	2018	Hofstra	Lehigh			

* Tie for team title

== Total championships ==
Team	Championships
Lehigh	40
Cornell	27
Penn State	16
Navy	13
Syracuse	8
Yale	7
Penn	4
Pitt	4
Princeton	3
Army	1
Harvard	1

== See also ==
- NCAA Wrestling Team Championship
