= Clarion Golden Eagles wrestling =

Clarion Golden Eagles
- University: PennWest Clarion
- Head coach: Keith Feraro (4th season)
- Conference: MAC
- Location: Clarion, PA
- Arena: Waldo S. Tippin Gymnasium (capacity: 2,500)
- Nickname: Golden Eagles
- Colors: Blue and gold

NCAA individual champions
- 8

Conference Tournament championships
- 1965, 1972, 1973, 1974, 1976, 1977, 1978, 1980, 1981, 1983, 1986, 1991, 1992, 1994, 1995, 2010

The Clarion Golden Eagles wrestling team represents PennWest Clarion in Clarion, Pennsylvania in wrestling.

The squad is coached by Keith Feraro, who replaced Troy Letters. Letter's replaced Matt Derlan, who is now the coach of the Binghamton Bearcats. Derlan replaced Teague Moore who left the Clarion collegiate wrestling program to become the head coach at American University.

The Golden Eagles wrestle in the Mid-American Conference (MAC) and as of the 2018–2019 season participated in the Pennsylvania State Athletic Conference (PSAC) as well. The Eagles were members of the Eastern Wrestling League until the end of the 2018–19 season when all members of the EWL accepted affiliate membership in the MAC for wrestling starting in the 2019–20 season. They qualify for the NCAA Division I Wrestling Championships as Division I members of the MAC. The PSAC comprises both Division I and II squads.

Notable former Golden Eagle wrestlers include national champions Wade Schalles and Kurt Angle, who after leaving Clarion would go on to win a gold medal in the 1996 Summer Olympics before embarking on a career in professional wrestling. In 2020, Clarion wrestling alumnus Bekzod Abdurakhmonov won a bronze medal at the Tokyo Olympics

== National Collegiate Athletic Association National Champions ==
Name	Year	NCAA Location	High School
Gary Barton	1972	University of Maryland	Fairview, Pennsylvania
Wade Schalles	1972	University of Maryland	Hollidaysburg, Pennsylvania
Don Rohn	1973	University of Washington	Saucon Valley, Pennsylvania
Wade Schalles	1973	University of Washington	Hollidaysburg, Pennsylvania
Bill Simpson	1973	University of Washington	Gaithersburg, Maryland
Kurt Angle	1990	University of Maryland	Mt. Lebanon, Pennsylvania
Kurt Angle	1992	Oklahoma City, OK	Mt. Lebanon, Pennsylvania
Sheldon Thomas	1996	University of Minnesota	St. Marks, Delaware

== Team Championships ==
Championship	Year
Pennsylvania State Athletic Conference	2010
Eastern Wrestling League	1995
Eastern Wrestling League	1994
Pennsylvania State Athletic Conference	1994
Pennsylvania State Athletic Conference	1992
Pennsylvania State Athletic Conference	1991
Pennsylvania State Athletic Conference	1986
Pennsylvania State Athletic Conference	1983
Pennsylvania State Athletic Conference	1981
Eastern Wrestling League	1980
Pennsylvania State Athletic Conference	1978
Pennsylvania State Athletic Conference	1977
Pennsylvania State Athletic Conference	1976
Pennsylvania State Athletic Conference	1974
Pennsylvania State Athletic Conference	1973
Pennsylvania State Athletic Conference	1972
Pennsylvania State Athletic Conference	1965

== Rankings ==
Clarion's wrestling program earned its highest ever dual meet ranking in 1986. The Golden Eagles went on to finish the season undefeated, with a record of 17–0–1. The 1986 season was the third season in Clarion's history in which the Golden Eagles finished without a loss.

NWCA Division I National Dual Meet Wrestling Rankings (February 3, 1986)

1. University of Iowa
2. Iowa State University
3. Clarion University
4. Penn State University
5. University of Wisconsin
6. Bloomsburg University
7. University of Oklahoma
8. University of North Carolina
9. University of Northern Iowa
10. Oklahoma State University

== Clarion University Golden Eagles Wrestling Head Coaches ==
Name	First year	Last year	Years	Matches	Wins	Losses	Ties	Win %	Alma mater
Frank Lignelli	1959	1966	6	73	61	12	0	.836	Clarion State Teachers College
Bob Bubb	1967	1992	25	447	322	121	4	.725	University of Pittsburgh ('59)
Jack Davis	1993	1997	4	82	43	34	5	.555	Clarion State College
Ken Nellis	1998	2006	8	139	47	89	3	.349	Clarion University of Pennsylvania ('86)
Teague Moore	2007	2011	5	98	37	60	1	.383	Oklahoma State University ('99)
Matt Dernlan	2012	2012	1	13	6	7	0	.462	Liberty University ('96)
Troy Letters	2013	2014	2	39	14	25	0	.483	Lehigh University
Keith Ferraro	2014	present	9	140	64	76	0	.457	Lock Haven University ('03)
