= 2023 NCAA Women's Water Polo Championship =

Collegiate water polo championship

Tournament details
- Dates: May 10–14, 2023
- Teams: 9

Final positions
- Champions: Stanford
- Runners-up: USC
- Third place: Princeton, UCLA

Awards
- Best player: Aria Fischer (Stanford)

The 2023 NCAA National Collegiate Women's Water Polo Championship was the 22nd edition of the NCAA Women's Water Polo Championship, the annual tournament to decide the championship of NCAA women's collegiate water polo. The tournament was held from May 10 to May 14, 2023, from the Eberhardt Aquatics Center in Stockton, California. The championship game was streamed live on ESPNU. Stanford defeated USC 11-9 for the program's ninth national title in this sport.

== Qualifying teams ==
The field of teams was revealed in a selection show held on May 1, 2023. Six conferences were granted automatic qualification to the championship: the Big West Conference, Collegiate Water Polo Association, Golden Coast Conference, Metro Atlantic Athletic Conference, Mountain Pacific Sports Federation, and Western Water Polo Association. Three additional teams earned entry into the tournament with at-large bids, with all of them coming from the Mountain Pacific Sports Federation.

Seed	Team	Conference	Bid type	Appearance
1	Stanford	MPSF	Automatic	22nd
2	USC	MPSF	At-large	18th
3	California	MPSF	At-large	9th
4	UCLA	MPSF	At-large	21st
	Biola	WWPA	Automatic	1st
	Fresno State	GCC	Automatic	3rd
	Long Island	MAAC	Automatic	1st
	Princeton	CWPA	Automatic	4th
	UC Irvine	Big West	Automatic	8th

== Schedule and results ==
All times Eastern.

Game	Time	Matchup	Score	TV	Attendance
Opening Round – Wednesday, May 10
1	4:00 p.m.	LIU vs. Biola	10–8	NCAA.com	
Quarterfinals – Friday, May 12
2	3:00 p.m.	No. 1 Stanford vs. LIU	23–0	NCAA.com	
3	5:00 p.m.	No. 4 UCLA vs. UC Irvine	14–12	NCAA.com	
4	7:00 p.m.	No. 2 USC vs. Fresno State	12–8	NCAA.com	
5	9:00 p.m.	No. 3 California vs. Princeton	9–11	NCAA.com	
Semifinals – Saturday, May 13
6	8:00 p.m.	No. 1 Stanford vs. No. 4 UCLA	14–9	NCAA.com	
7	10:00 p.m.	No. 2 USC vs. Princeton	18–8	NCAA.com	
Championship – Sunday, May 14
8	10:00 p.m.	No. 1 Stanford vs. No. 2 USC	11–9	ESPNU	2,449

== Tournament bracket ==
Opening round Wednesday, May 10, 2023
Long Island	10
Biola	8

Quarterfinals; Friday, May 12, 2023
1	Stanford	23
Long Island	0
4	UCLA	14
UC Irvine	12
2	USC	12
Fresno State	8
3	California	9
Princeton	11

Semifinals; Saturday, May 13, 2023
1	Stanford	14
4	UCLA	9
2	USC	18
Princeton	8

Championship; Sunday, May 14, 2023
1	Stanford	11
2	USC	9

== All Tournament Team ==
=== First Team ===
- Aria Fischer (Most Outstanding Player, Stanford)
- Paige Hauschild (USC)
- Ava Johnson (UCLA)
- Tilly Kearns (USC)
- Lindsey Lucas (Princeton)
- Ryann Neushul (Stanford)
- Jovanna Sekulic (Princeton)

=== Second Team ===
- Katrina Drake (UCLA)
- Elena Flynn (UC Irvine)
- Daphne Guervremont (Fresno State)
- Jewel Roemer (Stanford)
- Carolyne Stern (Stanford)
- Razanne Voorvelt (California)
- Bayley Weber (USC)
