= 2026 NCAA Women's Water Polo Championship =

Collegiate water polo championship

Tournament details
- Dates: April 22 and 24–26, 2026
- Teams: 9

Final positions
- Champions: Southern California
- Runners-up: California

The 2026 NCAA National Collegiate Women's Water Polo Championship was the 25th edition of the NCAA Women's Water Polo Championship, the annual tournament to decide the champion of NCAA women's collegiate water polo. The tournament started on April 22 and resumed April 24 through April 26, 2026, at the Canyonview Pool in San Diego, California, which was hosted by University of California, San Diego (UC San Diego). The opening match was on ESPN+ but the majority of the tournament was streamed on NCAA.com, while the national championship game was aired live on ESPNU.

== Qualifying teams ==
The field of teams was revealed during a selection show that was held on April 13, 2026. Six conferences were granted automatic qualification to the championship: the Big West Conference, Collegiate Water Polo Association, Golden Coast Conference, Metro Atlantic Athletic Conference, Mountain Pacific Sports Federation and Western Water Polo Association. Three additional teams gained entry into the tournament with at-large bids, all of which came from the Mountain Pacific Sports Federation.

Seed	Team	Conference	Bid type	Appearance
1	Stanford	MPSF	Automatic	25th
2	UCLA	MPSF	At-large	24th
3	Southern California	MPSF	At-large	22nd
4	California	MPSF	At-large	12th
	Hawai'i	Big West	Automatic	10th
	Loyola Marymount	GCC	Automatic	11th
	Harvard	CWPA	Automatic	2nd
	Wagner	MAAC	Automatic	12th
	Concordia Irvine	WWPA	Automatic	1st

== Schedule and results ==
all times Eastern.

Game	Time	Matchup	Score	TV	Attendance
Opening Round – Wednesday, April 22
1	9:00 p.m.	Wagner vs. CUI	10–8	ESPN+	
Quarterfinals – Friday, April 24
2	3:00 p.m.	Stanford vs. Wagner	18–6	NCAA.com	
3	5:00 p.m.	California vs. Hawai'i	15–10	NCAA.com	
4	7:00 p.m.	UCLA vs. Harvard	15–5	NCAA.com	
5	9:00 p.m.	Southern California vs. LMU	10–5	NCAA.com	
Semifinals – Saturday, April 25
6	7:00 p.m.	Stanford vs. California	11–13	NCAA.com	
7	10:00 p.m.	UCLA vs. Southern California	10–11	NCAA.com	
Championship – Sunday, April 26
8	9:00 p.m.	California vs. Southern California	9–10	ESPNU	

== Tournament bracket ==
Opening round Wednesday, April 22, 2026
Wagner	10
CUI	8

Quarterfinals; Friday, April 24, 2026
1	Stanford	18
Wagner	6
4	California	15
Hawai'i	10
2	UCLA	15
Harvard	5
3	Southern California	10
LMU	5

Semifinals; Saturday, April 25, 2026
1	Stanford	11
4	California	13
2	UCLA	10
3	Southern California	11

Championship; Sunday, April 26, 2026
4	California	9
3	Southern California	10

== All tournament team ==
*Most Valuable Player of the Tournament

=== First Team ===
- Emily Ausmus* (Southern California)
- Julia Bonaguidi (California)
- Anna Pearson (UCLA)
- Anna Reed (Southern California)
- Ava Stryker (Southern California)
- Eszter Varró (California)
- Ella Woodhead (Stanford)

=== Second Team ===
- Juliette Dhalluin (Stanford)
- Jenna Flynn (Stanford)
- Rachel Gazzaniga (Southern California)
- Abbi Magee (California)
- Taylor Smith (UCLA)
- Lauren Steele (UCLA)
- Agatha Weston (Hawai'i)
