= 2024 NCAA Women's Water Polo Championship =

Collegiate water polo championship

Tournament details
- Dates: May 10–12, 2024
- Teams: 9

Final positions
- Champions: UCLA
- Runners-up: California
- Third place: Hawaii and Stanford

Awards
- Best player: Lauren Steele (UCLA)

The 2024 NCAA National Collegiate Women's Water Polo Championship was the 23rd edition of the NCAA Women's Water Polo Championship, the annual tournament which is to decide the championship of NCAA women's collegiate water polo. The tournament was held from May 10 to May 12, 2024, at the Spieker Aquatics Complex in Berkeley, California. The championship game aired live on ESPNU. Other matches were streamed on NCAA.com. The UCLA Bruins defeated Cal to win the national championship, first since 2009 as well the 8th in this sport plus it was the 123rd NCAA title for the university.

== Qualifying teams ==
The field of teams was revealed in a selection show on April 29, 2024. Six conferences were granted automatic qualification to the championship: the Big West Conference, Collegiate Water Polo Association, Golden Coast Conference, Metro Atlantic Athletic Conference, Mountain Pacific Sports Federation and Western Water Polo Association. Three additional teams earned entry into the tournament with at-large bids, with all of them coming from the Mountain Pacific Sports Federation.

Seed	Team	Conference	Bid type	Appearance
1	UCLA	MPSF	Automatic	22nd
2	Hawai'i	Big West	Automatic	8th
3	California	MPSF	At-large	10th
4	Stanford	MPSF	At-large	23rd
	USC	MPSF	At-large	19th
	Fresno State	GCC	Automatic	4th
	Princeton	CWPA	Automatic	5th
	Biola	WWPA	Automatic	2nd
	Wagner College	MAAC	Automatic	1st

== Schedule and results ==
All times Eastern.

Game	Time	Matchup	Score	TV	Attendance
Opening Round – Wednesday, May 8
1	8:00 p.m.	Wagner vs. Biola	15–14	NCAA.com	
Quarterfinals – Friday, May 10
2	3:00 p.m.	No. 1 UCLA vs. Wagner	17–7	NCAA.com	
3	5:00 p.m.	No. 4 Stanford vs. USC	8–3	NCAA.com	
4	7:00 p.m.	No. 2 Hawaii vs. Princeton	11–6	NCAA.com	
5	9:00 p.m.	No. 3 California vs. Fresno State	14–7	NCAA.com	
Semifinals – Saturday, May 11
6	5:00 p.m.	No. 1 UCLA vs. No. 4 Stanford	10–8	NCAA.com	
7	7:00 p.m.	No. 2 Hawaii vs. No. 3 California	6–9	NCAA.com	
Championship – Sunday, May 12
8	10:00 p.m.	No. 1 UCLA vs. No. 3 California	7–4	ESPNU	1,585

== Tournament bracket ==
Opening round Wednesday, May 8, 2024
Wagner	15
Biola	14

Quarterfinals; Friday, May 10, 2024
1	UCLA	17
Wagner	7
4	Stanford	8
USC	3
2	Hawaii	11
Princeton	6
3	California	14
Fresno State	7

Semifinals; Saturday, May 11, 2024
1	UCLA	10
4	Stanford	8
2	Hawaii	6
3	California	9

Championship; Sunday, May 12, 2024
1	UCLA	7
3	California	4

== All Tournament Team ==
=== First Team ===
- Lauren Steele (Most Outstanding Player, UCLA)
- Hannah Palmer (UCLA)
- Anna Pearson (UCLA)
- Bia Mantellato Dias (Hawaii)
- Bernadette Doyle (Hawaii)
- Maryn Dempsey (California)
- Sophie Wallace (Stanford)

=== Second Team ===
- Kayla Yelensky (Princeton)
- Nina Flynn (California)
- Isabel Williams (California)
- Hailey Andress (Fresno State)
- Tina Hicks (Stanford)
- Ava Striker (USC)
- Acba Monarusa Boix (Hawaii)
