= 2022 NCAA Women's Water Polo Championship =

Collegiate water polo championship

Tournament details
- Dates: May 4–8, 2022
- Teams: 9

Final positions
- Champions: Stanford
- Runners-up: USC
- Third place: UCLA, California

Awards
- Best player: Makenzie Fischer, Stanford

The 2022 NCAA National Collegiate Women's Water Polo Championship was the 21st edition of the NCAA Women's Water Polo Championship, the annual tournament to decide the championship of NCAA women's collegiate water polo. The tournament was held May 4–8, 2022, at the Canham Natatorium in Ann Arbor, Michigan. Stanford defeated USC 10–7 for the program's eighth national title in the sport.

== Qualifying teams ==
The field of teams was revealed in a selection show on April 25, 2022. Six conferences were granted automatic qualification to the championship: the Big West Conference, Collegiate Water Polo Association, Golden Coast Conference, Metro Atlantic Athletic Conference, Mountain Pacific Sports Federation, and Western Water Polo Association. Three additional teams earned entry into the tournament with at-large bids, with all of them coming from the Mountain Pacific Sports Federation.

== Schedule and results ==
All times Eastern.

Game	Time	Matchup	Score	TV	Attendance
Opening Round – Wednesday, May 4
1	11 a.m.	Wagner vs. Salem	15–9	BTN+	
Quarterfinals – Friday, May 6
2	12:00 p.m.	No. 1 Stanford vs. Wagner	16–6	NCAA.com	
3	2:00 p.m.	No. 4 UCLA vs. UC Irvine	8–7	NCAA.com	
4	4:00 p.m.	No. 2 USC vs. Fresno State	15–9	NCAA.com	
5	6:00 p.m.	No. 3 California vs. Michigan	10–4	NCAA.com	
Semifinals – Saturday, May 7
6	3:00 p.m.	Stanford vs. UCLA	10–7	NCAA.com	
7	5:00 p.m.	USC vs. California	9–7	NCAA.com	
Championship – Sunday, May 8
8	3:00 p.m.	Stanford vs. USC	10–7	ESPNU	1,569

== Tournament bracket ==
Opening round Wednesday, May 4, 2022
Wagner	15
Salem	9

Quarterfinals; Friday, May 6, 2022
1	Stanford	16
Wagner	6
4	UCLA	8
UC Irvine	7
2	USC	15
Fresno State	9
3	California	10
Michigan	4

Semifinals; Saturday, May 7, 2022
1	Stanford	10
4	UCLA	7
2	USC	9
3	California	7

Championship; Sunday, May 8, 2022
1	Stanford	10
2	USC	7

== All Tournament Team ==
=== First Team ===
- Makenzie Fischer, Stanford (Most Outstanding Player)
- Aria Fischer, Stanford
- Paige Hauschild, USC
- Tilly Kearns, USC
- Maddie Musselman, UCLA
- Tara Prentice, UC Irvine
- Isabel Williams, California

=== Second Team ===
- Ryann Neuschul, Stanford
- Jewel Roemer, Stanford
- Maya Avital, Stanford
- Emma Wright, California
- Maddie O'Reilly, Michigan
- Fanni Muzsnay, Fresno State
- Abbey Simshauser, Wagner
