= 2002 NCAA Women's Water Polo Championship =

Water polo tournament season

Tournament details
- Dates: May 11–12, 2002
- Teams: 4

Final positions
- Champions: Stanford (1st title)
- Runners-up: UCLA (2nd title game)
- Third place: Loyola Marymount
- Fourth place: Michigan

Tournament statistics
- Matches played: 3
- Goals scored: 51 (17 per match)
- Top goal scorer(s): Brenda Villa, Stanford (5)

Awards
- Best player: Jackie Frank, Stanford

The 2002 NCAA Women's Water Polo Championship was the second annual tournament to determine the national championship of NCAA women's collegiate water polo. The single elimination tournament was played at the McDonald's Olympic Swim Stadium in Los Angeles, California from May 11–12, 2002.

Stanford, in a rematch of the previous year's final, defeated UCLA in the final, 8–4, to win their first NCAA championship. The Cardinal (23–2) were coached by John Tanner.

The leading scorer for the tournament was Brenda Villa, from Stanford, with 5 goals. Stanford's Jackie Frank was named the tournament's Most Outstanding Player.

First and second All Tournament Teams were also named, each consisting of seven players.

== Qualification ==
Since there has only ever been one single national championship for women's water polo, all NCAA women's water polo programs (whether from Division I, Division II, or Division III) were eligible. A total of 4 teams were invited to contest this championship.

Team	Appearance	Previous
Loyola Marymount	2nd	2001
Michigan	1st	Never
Stanford	2nd	2001
UCLA	2nd	2001

== Tournament bracket ==
- Site: McDonald's Olympic Swim Stadium, Los Angeles, California

Semifinals; May 11, 2002
Stanford	13
Michigan	3
UCLA	11
Loyola Marymount	2

Championship; May 12, 2002
Stanford	8
UCLA	4
Third Place; May 11, 2002
Michigan	4
Loyola Marymount	6

== All tournament teams ==
=== First Team ===
- Jackie Frank, Stanford (Most Outstanding Player)
- Kelly Heuchan, UCLA
- Ellen Estes, Stanford
- Robin Beauregard, UCLA
- Brenda Villa, Stanford
- Lucy Windes, Loyola Marymount
- Natalie Golda, UCLA
- Amber Stachowski, UCLA

=== Second Team ===
- Betsey Armstrong, Michigan
- Thalia Munro, UCLA
- Julie Gardner, Stanford
- Teresa Guidi, Loyola Marymount
- Wendy Watkins, Stanford
- Jamie Hipp, UCLA
- Jen Crisman, Michigan
- Margie Dingeldein, Stanford

== See also ==
- Pre-NCAA Intercollegiate Women's Water Polo Champions (pre-2001)
- NCAA Men's Water Polo Championship
