= 2025 NCAA Women's Water Polo Championship =

Collegiate water polo championship

Tournament details
- Dates: May 9–11, 2025
- Teams: 9

Final positions
- Champions: Stanford, 10th title
- Runners-up: USC
- Third place: Hawaii and UCLA

Awards
- Best player: Christine Carpenter, Stanford

The 2025 NCAA National Collegiate Women's Water Polo Championship was the 24th edition of the NCAA Women's Water Polo Championship, for the annual tournament to decide the championship of NCAA women's collegiate water polo. The tournament was held from May 9 to May 11, 2025, at the IU Natatorium in Indianapolis, Indiana. In the championship game, aired live on ESPNU, Stanford defeated Southern California 11-7. It was Stanford's 10th NCAA title in women's water polo plus it was 137th NCAA title in a team sport.

== Qualifying teams ==
The field of teams was revealed in a selection show that was on April 28, 2025. Six conferences are granted automatic qualification to the championship: the Big West Conference, Collegiate Water Polo Association, Golden Coast Conference, Metro Atlantic Athletic Conference, Mountain Pacific Sports Federation and Western Water Polo Association. Three additional teams earned entry into the tournament with at-large bids, with all of them coming from the Mountain Pacific Sports Federation.

Seed	Team	Conference	Bid type	Appearance
1	Stanford	MPSF	Automatic	24th
2	UCLA	MPSF	At-large	23rd
3	USC	MPSF	At-large	21st
4	Hawai'i	Big West	Automatic	9th
	California	MPSF	At-large	19th
	Loyola Marymount	GCC	Automatic	10th
	Harvard	CWPA	Automatic	1st
	McKendree	WWPA	Automatic	1st
	Wagner College	MAAC	Automatic	8th

== Schedule and results ==
All times Eastern

Game	Time	Matchup	Score	TV	Attendance
Opening Round – Wednesday, May 7
1	6:00 p.m.	Wagner vs. McKendree	19–7	NCAA.com	
Quarterfinals – Friday, May 9
2	12:00 p.m.	Stanford vs. Wagner	28–7	NCAA.com	
3	2:00 p.m.	Hawaii vs. California	8–7	NCAA.com	287
4	4:00 p.m.	UCLA vs. LMU (CA)	11–8	NCAA.com	302
5	6:00 p.m.	Southern California vs. Harvard	18–7	NCAA.com	345
Semifinals – Saturday, May 10
6	12:00 p.m.	Stanford vs. Hawaii	13–4	NCAA.com	329
7	2:00 p.m.	UCLA vs. Southern California	13–15	NCAA.com	348
Championship – Sunday, May 11
8	12:00 p.m.	Stanford vs. Southern California	11–7	ESPNU	398

== Tournament bracket ==
Opening round Wednesday, May 7, 2025
Wagner	19
McKendree	7

Quarterfinals; Friday, May 9, 2025
1	Stanford	28
Wagner	6
4	Hawaii	8
California	7
2	UCLA	11
LMU (CA)	8
3	USC	18
Harvard	7

Semifinals; Saturday, May 10, 2025
1	Stanford	13
4	Hawaii	4
2	UCLA	13
3	USC	15

Championship; Sunday, May 11, 2025
1	Stanford	11
3	USC	7

== All Tournament Team ==
=== First Team ===
- Ryann Neushul (Stanford)
- Jenna Flynn (Stanford)
- Emma Lineback (UCLA)
- Tilly Kearns (USC)
- Rachel Gazzaniga (USC)
- Bernadette Doyle (Hawai’i)
- Christine Carpenter (Most Outstanding Player, Stanford)

=== Second Team ===
- Ava Stryker (USC)
- Anna Pearson (UCLA)
- Jordan Wedderburn (Hawai’i)
- Eszter Varro (California)
- Ruby Hodge (Harvard)
- Ruth Arino Ariz (Loyola Marymount)
- Anna Reed (USC)
