= Verica Bakoc =

Canadian water polo player (born 1999)

Verica Bakoc OLY
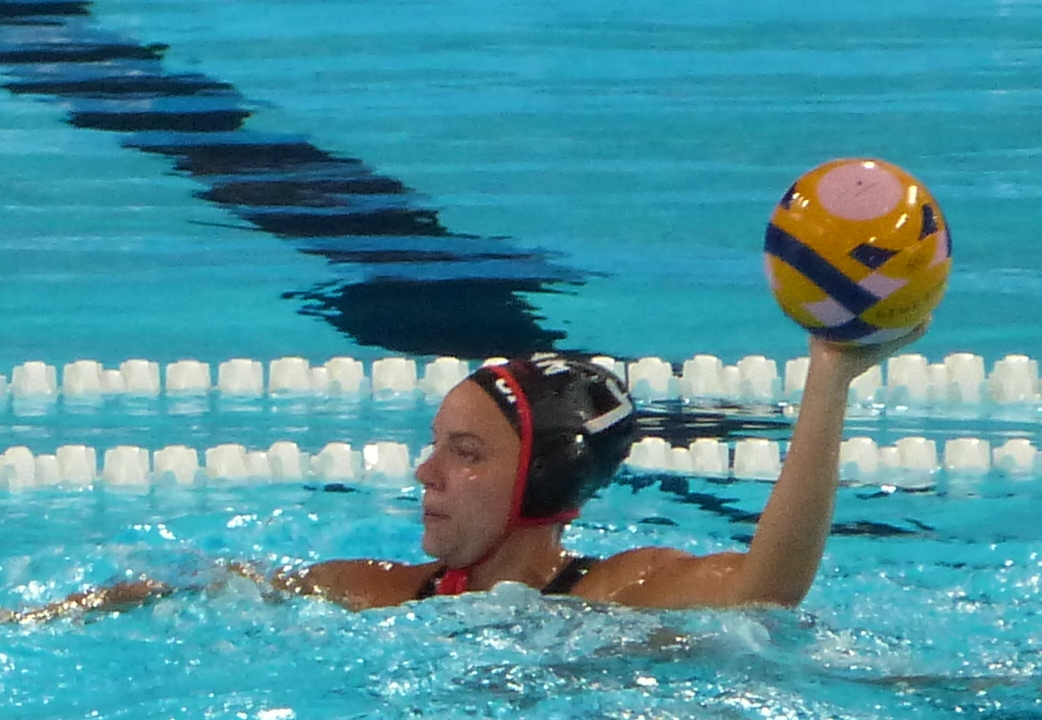
- Bakoc in 2024

Personal information
- Full name: Verica Bakoc
- Born: May 3, 1999 (age 27) Toronto, Ontario, Canada
- Height: 1.72 m (5 ft 8 in)

Sport
- Sport: Water polo
- Position: Field player
- College team: USC Trojans
- Current club: Rapallo Pallanuoto
Medal record
Women's water polo
Representing Canada
FINA World League
Silver medal – second place	2017 Shanghai
Pan American Games
Silver medal – second place	2023 Santiago	Team

Verica Bakoc (pronounced [ʋêritsa bǎkotʃ]; born May 3, 1999) is a Canadian water polo player who plays for Rapallo and for the Canada women's national team.

== Career ==
=== College and club career ===
Bakoc was part of the USC Trojans side that finished first in the 2018 NCAA Women's Water Polo Championship, second in 2019 and first in 2021.

She was also part of the Ethnikos Piraeus side that won the 2021–22 Women's LEN Trophy and has played for Mediterrani.

Bakoc signed for Rapallo ahead of the 2025–26 Serie A1 season.

=== International career ===
Bakoc represented Canada at the youth and junior level at the FINA Youth World Championships in 2016 where she won bronze as well as at the 2019 Universiade and 2019 FINA Junior World Championships.

She represented Canada at the 2017 FINA Intercontinental Tournament, the 2022 FINA Water Polo World League, the 2022 World Aquatics Championships, 2023 World Aquatics Championships, the 2023 Pan American Games (winning silver), the 2024 World Aquatics Championships and at the 2024 Summer Olympics.

== Personal life ==
Bakoc's father Dragan is involved in professional soccer as the president of Serbian White Eagles FC and the Canadian Soccer League. Her family hails from Herceg Novi, Montenegro.
