= 2001 NCAA Women's Water Polo Championship =

Water polo tournament season

Tournament details
- Dates: May 2001
- Teams: 4

Final positions
- Champions: UCLA (1st title)
- Runner-up: Stanford (1st title game)
- Third place: Loyola Marymount
- Fourth place: Brown

Tournament statistics
- Matches played: 3
- Goals scored: 51 (17 per match)
- Top goal scorer(s): Kelly Heuchan, UCLA (4)

Awards
- Best player: Coralie Simmons, UCLA

The 2001 NCAA Women's Water Polo Championship was the first annual tournament to determine the national championship of NCAA women's collegiate water polo. The single elimination tournament was played at the Avery Aquatic Center in Stanford, California during May 2001.

UCLA defeated Stanford in the final, 5–4, to win their first NCAA championship. The Bruins (19–4) were coached by Adam Krikorian. Krikorian also won a championship as the coach of UCLA's men's water polo team during the same 2000–01 season.

The leading scorer for the tournament was Kelly Heuchan, from UCLA, with 4 goals. First and second All Tournament Teams were also named, with seven players comprising the former (including the tournament's Most Outstanding Player, Coralie Simmons from UCLA) and six for the latter.

== Qualification ==
Since there has only ever been one single national championship for women's water polo, all NCAA women's water polo programs (whether from Division I, Division II, or Division III) were eligible. A total of 4 teams were invited to contest this championship.

Team	Appearance	Previous
Brown	1st	Never
Loyola Marymount	1st	Never
Stanford	1st	Never
UCLA	1st	Never

== Tournament bracket ==
- Site: Avery Aquatic Center, Stanford, California

Semifinals
UCLA	11
Loyola Marymount	5
Stanford	12
Brown	0

Championship
UCLA	5
Stanford	4
Third Place
Loyola Marymount	9
Brown	5

== All tournament teams ==
=== First Team ===
- Coralie Simmons, UCLA (Most Outstanding Player)
- Robin Beauregard, UCLA
- Kelly Heuchan, UCLA
- Jackie Frank, Stanford
- Ellen Estes, Stanford
- Brenda Villa, Stanford
- Lucy Windes, Loyola Marymount

=== Second Team ===
- Margie Dingeldein, Stanford
- Jamie Hipp, UCLA
- Elaine Zivich, UCLA
- Jamie Kroeze, Loyola Marymount
- Jenny Lamb, UCLA
- Kristin Guerin, UCLA

== See also ==
- Pre-NCAA Intercollegiate Women's Water Polo Champions (tournaments from before NCAA sponsorship in 2001)
- NCAA Men's Water Polo Championship
