= 2003 NCAA Women's Water Polo Championship =

Tournament details
- Dates: May 10–11, 2003
- Teams: 4

Final positions
- Champions: UCLA (2nd title)
- Runners-up: Stanford (3rd title game)
- Third place: Loyola Marymount
- Fourth place: Indiana

Tournament statistics
- Matches played: 4
- Goals scored: 36 (9 per match)
- Attendance: 4,276 (1,069 per match)
- Top goal scorer(s): Jessica López, UCLA; Kelly Rulon, UCLA; Lauren Boreta, Stanford; Hannah Luber, Stanford; Katie Hicks, LMU (3)

Awards
- Best player: Robin Beauregard, UCLA

The 2002 NCAA Women's Water Polo Championship was the third annual tournament to determine the national championship of NCAA women's collegiate water polo. The single-elimination tournament was played at Canyonview Pool at the University of California, San Diego in La Jolla, San Diego, California from May 10–11, 2003.

UCLA, in a rematch of the previous two years' finals, defeated Stanford in the final, 4–3, to win their second NCAA championship. The Bruins (23–4) were coached by Adam Krikorian.

UCLA's Robin Beauregard was named the tournament's Most Outstanding Player. Five different players (2 from UCLA, 2 from Stanford, and 1 from Loyola Marymount) tied as the tournament's leading scorer, with 3 goals each.

== Qualification ==
Since there has only ever been one single national championship for women's water polo, all NCAA women's water polo programs (whether from Division I, Division II, or Division III) were eligible. A total of 4 teams were invited to contest this championship.

Team	Appearance	Previous
Loyola Marymount	3rd	2002
Indiana	1st	Never
Stanford	3rd	2002
UCLA	3rd	2002

== Tournament bracket ==
- Site: Canyonview Pool, La Jolla, San Diego, California

Semifinals; May 10, 2003
Stanford	13
Indiana	2
UCLA	8
Loyola Marymount	2

Championship; May 11, 2003
Stanford	3
UCLA	4
Third Place; May 11, 2003
Indiana	2
Loyola Marymount	5

== All tournament teams ==
=== First Team ===
- Robin Beauregard, UCLA (Most Outstanding Player)
- Natalie Golda, UCLA
- Jessica López, UCLA
- Jackie Frank, Stanford
- Julie Gardner, Stanford
- Hannah Luber, Stanford
- Kelty Luber, Stanford
- Brenda Villa, Stanford
- Katie Hicks, Loyola Marymount
- Krista Peterson, Indiana

=== Second Team ===
- Maureen Flanagan, UCLA
- Jamie Hipp, UCLA
- Kelly Rulon, UCLA
- Teresa Guidi, Loyola Marymount
- Devon Wright, Loyola Marymount
- Kristin Stanford, Indiana

== See also ==
- Pre-NCAA Intercollegiate Women's Water Polo Champions (pre-2001)
- NCAA Men's Water Polo Championship
