= 2016–17 NCAA championships =

The 2016–17 NCAA championships were contested by the NCAA throughout the course of the 2016–17 college athletics season to determine the team and individual national champions of 23 different men's and women's sports at the Division I, Division II, and Division III levels. Some sports have championships at all three levels and others have just a single national championship.

== Championships ==
=== Division I ===
Sport/Event	Championship	Finals Site Host(s)	Date(s)	Team Champion(s)
Baseball	2017 NCAA Division I baseball tournament	TD Ameritrade Park Omaha; Omaha, Nebraska,	June 17–29, 2017	Coastal Carolina
Basketball (M)	2017 NCAA Division I men's basketball tournament	University of Phoenix Stadium; Glendale, Arizona	April 1–3, 2017	North Carolina (5th)
Basketball (W)	2017 NCAA Division I women's basketball tournament	American Airlines Center; Dallas, Texas,	March 31–April 2, 2017	South Carolina (1st)
Cross Country (M)	2016 NCAA Division I Cross Country Championships	Wabash Valley Family Sports Center; Terre Haute, Indiana; Indiana State University	November 19, 2016	Northern Arizona (1st)
Cross Country (W)	2016 NCAA Division I Cross Country Championships	Wabash Valley Family Sports Center; Terre Haute, Indiana; Indiana State University	November 19, 2016	Oregon (4th)
Field hockey	2016 NCAA Division I Field Hockey Championship	L.R. Hill Complex; Norfolk, Virginia; Old Dominion University	November 18–20, 2016	Delaware (1st)
Football	2016 NCAA Division I FCS football season	Toyota Stadium; Frisco, Texas,	January 7, 2017	James Madison (2nd)
Golf (M)	2017 NCAA Division I Men's Golf Championship	Rich Harvest Farms; Sugar Grove, Illinois; Northern Illinois University	May 26–31, 2017	Oklahoma
Golf (W)	2017 NCAA Division I Women's Golf Championship	Rich Harvest Farms; Sugar Grove, Illinois; Northern Illinois University	May 19–24, 2017	TBD
Ice Hockey (M)	2017 NCAA Division I Men's Ice Hockey Tournament	United Center; Chicago, Illinois; Notre Dame University	April 6–8, 2017	Denver (8th)
Ice Hockey (W)	2017 NCAA National Collegiate Women's Ice Hockey Tournament	Family Arena; St. Charles, Missouri; Lindenwood University	March 17–19, 2017	Clarkson (2nd)
Lacrosse (M)	2017 NCAA Division I Men's Lacrosse Championship	Gillette Stadium; Foxborough, Massachusetts; University of Massachusetts Amherst	May 20–21, 2017	TBD
Lacrosse (W)	2017 NCAA Division I Women's Lacrosse Championship	Gillette Stadium; Foxborough, Massachusetts; University of Massachusetts Amherst	May 26–28, 2017	TBD
Rowing (W)	2017 NCAA Division I Rowing Championships	Lake Mercer; West Windsor, New Jersey,	May 26–28, 2017	TBD
Soccer (M)	2016 NCAA Division I Men's Soccer Championship	BBVA Compass Stadium; Houston, Texas; University of Houston	November 17–December 11, 2016	Stanford (2nd)
Soccer (W)	2016 NCAA Division I Women's Soccer Tournament	Avaya Stadium; San Jose, California	December 2–4, 2016	USC (2nd)
Softball	2017 NCAA Division I softball tournament	ASA Hall of Fame Stadium; Oklahoma City, Oklahoma	June 1–7, 2017	TBD
Swimming and Diving (M)	2017 NCAA Division I Men's Swimming and Diving Championships	Indiana University Natatorium; Indianapolis, Indiana; IUPUI	March 23–25, 2017	TBD
Swimming and Diving (W)	2017 NCAA Division I Women's Swimming and Diving Championships	Indiana University Natatorium; Indianapolis, Indiana; IUPUI	March 16–18, 2017	TBD
Tennis (M)	2017 NCAA Division I Tennis Championships	Dan Magill Tennis Complex; Athens, Georgia; University of Georgia	May 18–29, 2017	TBD
Tennis (W)	2017 NCAA Division I Tennis Championships	Dan Magill Tennis Complex; Athens, Georgia; University of Georgia	May 18–29, 2017	TBD
Indoor Track and Field (M)	2017 NCAA Division I Indoor Track and Field Championships	Gilliam Indoor Track; College Station, Texas; Texas A&M University	March 10–11, 2017	Texas A&M (1st)
Indoor Track and Field (W)	2017 NCAA Division I Indoor Track and Field Championships	Gilliam Indoor Track; College Station, Texas; Texas A&M University	March 10–11, 2017	Oregon (7th)
Outdoor Track and Field (M)	2017 NCAA Division I Outdoor Track and Field Championships	Hayward Field; Eugene, Oregon; University of Oregon	June 7–10, 2017	TBD
Outdoor Track and Field (W)	2017 NCAA Division I Outdoor Track and Field Championships	Hayward Field; Eugene, Oregon; University of Oregon	June 7–10, 2017	TBD
Volleyball (M)	2017 NCAA National Collegiate men's volleyball tournament	St. John Arena; Columbus, Ohio; Ohio State University	May 4–6, 2017	Ohio State (3rd)
Volleyball (W)	2016 NCAA Division I women's volleyball tournament	Sprint Center; Kansas City, Missouri; UMKC	December 15–17, 2016	Stanford (7th)
Wrestling	2017 NCAA Division I Wrestling Championships	Scottrade Center; St. Louis, Missouri; University of Missouri	March 16–18, 2017	Penn State (7th)

=== Single Championship ===
Sport/Event	Championship	Finals Site/Location Host(s)	Date(s)	Team Champion
Beach Volleyball (W)	2017 NCAA Beach Volleyball Championship	Gulf Shores, Alabama; University of Alabama at Birmingham	May 5–7, 2017	USC (2nd)
Bowling (W)	2017 NCAA Bowling Championship	River Center Baton Rouge; Baton Rouge, Louisiana; Tulane University	April 13–15, 2017	McKendree (1st)
Fencing (Co-ed)	2017 NCAA Fencing Championships	Fishers S&E Center; Fishers, Indiana; Notre Dame University	March 23–26, 2017	Notre Dame (5th)
Gymnastics (M)	2017 NCAA Men's Gymnastics Championships	Holleder Center; West Point, New York; United States Military Academy	April 20–22, 2017	Oklahoma (11th)
Gymnastics (W)	2017 NCAA Women's Gymnastics Championship	Chaifetz Arena; St. Louis, Missouri; University of Missouri	April 14–16, 2017	Oklahoma (3rd)
Rifle (Co-ed)	2017 NCAA Rifle Championships	Converse Hall; Columbus, Ohio; Ohio State University	March 10–11, 2017	West Virginia (19th)
Skiing (Co-ed)	2017 NCAA Skiing Championships	Cannon Mountain; Franconia, New Hampshire; University of New Hampshire	March 8–11, 2017	Denver (23rd)
Water Polo (M)	2016 NCAA Men's Water Polo Championship	Uytengsu Aquatics Center; Los Angeles, California; University of Southern California	December 2–3, 2016	California (14th)
Water Polo (W)	2017 NCAA Women's Water Polo Championship	Indiana University Natatorium; Indianapolis, Indiana; IUPUI	May 12–14, 2017	TBD
