= 2019 NCAA Women's Water Polo Championship =

2019 college water polo tournament

Tournament details
- Dates: May 7–12, 2019
- Teams: 10

Final positions
- Champions: Stanford
- Runners-up: USC
- Third place: California; UCLA

Tournament statistics
- Matches played: 9

Awards
- Best player: Makenzie Fischer, Stanford

The 2019 NCAA National Collegiate Women's Water Polo Championship was the 19th annual tournament to decide the championship of NCAA women's collegiate water polo. Two play-in games were held on May 7, with the winners advancing to the main tournament, May 10–12 at the Avery Aquatic Center in Stanford, California, hosted by Stanford University.

== Qualification ==
The tournament was open to all programs from Divisions I, II, and III. Ten teams participated in the tournament: seven automatic bids and three at-large bids.

=== Bids ===
Team	Conference	Record	Bid	Source
No. 1 USC Trojans	MPSF	26–1	Automatic	
No. 2 Stanford Cardinal	MPSF	20–2	At-large	
No. 3 UCLA Bruins	MPSF	23–6	At-large	
No. 4 California Golden Bears	MPSF	16–8	At-large	
Hawaii Rainbow Wahine	Big West	18–5	Automatic	
Michigan Wolverines	CWPA	23–8	Automatic	
Pacific Tigers	Golden Coast	17–8	Automatic	
Wagner Seahawks	MAAC	30–9	Automatic	
California Lutheran Regals	SCIAC	21–8	Automatic	
UC San Diego Tritons	WWPA	21–13	Automatic	

== Tournament bracket ==
All times Eastern.

Play–in games Tuesday, May 7, 2019
Wagner	8
UC San Diego	12
Pacific	16
California Lutheran	4

Quarterfinals; Friday, May 10, 2019
1	USC	14
UC San Diego	8
4	California	17
Hawaii	13
2	Stanford	18
Pacific	9
3	UCLA	13
Michigan	7

Semifinals; Saturday, May 11, 2019
1	USC	10
4	California	8
2	Stanford	8
3	UCLA	7

Championship; Sunday, May 12, 2019
1	USC	8
2	Stanford	9

== Game summaries ==
=== Play–in games ===
May 7, 2019; 3:00 p.m.	Report	Wagner	8–12	UC San Diego	Avery Aquatic Center; Stanford, California
May 7, 2019; 3:00 p.m.	Report	Score by quarters: 1–4, 3–2, 1–2, 3–4			Avery Aquatic Center; Stanford, California
May 7, 2019; 3:00 p.m.	Report	Daisy Nankervis 3 Savannah Henshaw 2 Sofia Diaz Alvarez 1 Kristy Donkin 1 Jacqui Sjogren 1	Goals	Shelby Stender 4 Sydney Boland 2 Grace Pevehouse 2 Chanel Schilling 1 Ciara Franke 1 Jessee Ransone 1 Taylor Onstott 1	Avery Aquatic Center; Stanford, California

May 7, 2019; 4:45 p.m.	Report	Pacific	16–4	California Lutheran	Avery Aquatic Center; Stanford, California
May 7, 2019; 4:45 p.m.	Report	Score by quarters: 4–1, 3–1, 5–1, 4–1			Avery Aquatic Center; Stanford, California
May 7, 2019; 4:45 p.m.	Report	Kyra Christmas 5 Toula Falvey 3 Mariana Duarte 2 Savannah Fitzgerald 2 Truly Dorland 1 Viktoria Tamas 1 Lucy Davis 1 Brianna Utas 1	Goals	Lexi Rond 2 Nicole Roed 1 Mardell Ramirez 1	Avery Aquatic Center; Stanford, California

=== Quarterfinals ===
May 10, 2019; 3:00 p.m.	Report	No. 1 USC	14–8	UC San Diego	Avery Aquatic Center; Stanford, California
May 10, 2019; 3:00 p.m.	Report	Score by quarters: 3–1, 3–3, 6–0, 2–4			Avery Aquatic Center; Stanford, California
May 10, 2019; 3:00 p.m.	Report	Alejandra Aznar 3 Maud Megens 2 Verica Bakoc 2 Elise Stein 2 Denise Mammolito 1 Paige Hauschild 1 Kelsey McIntosh 1 Bayley Weber 1 Grace Tehaney 1	Goals	Grace Pevehouse 5 Chanel Schilling 1 Shelby Stender 1 Sydney Boland 1	Avery Aquatic Center; Stanford, California

May 10, 2019; 4:45 p.m.	Report	No. 4 California	17–13	Hawaii	Avery Aquatic Center; Stanford, California
May 10, 2019; 4:45 p.m.	Report	Score by quarters: 6–5, 2–3, 6–3, 3–2			Avery Aquatic Center; Stanford, California
May 10, 2019; 4:45 p.m.	Report	Brigit Mulder 4 Emma Wright 4 Kitty Lynn Joustra 3 Sarah Siepker 2 Elli Protopapas 2 Hannah DeRose 1 Georgia Bogle 1	Goals	Elyse Lemay-Lavoie 6 Maxine Schaap 2 Anna Bonamusa Boix 2 Femke Aan 1 Carmen Baringo 1 Irene Gonzalez 1	Avery Aquatic Center; Stanford, California

May 10, 2019; 6:30 p.m.	Report	No. 2 Stanford	18–9	Pacific	Avery Aquatic Center; Stanford, California
May 10, 2019; 6:30 p.m.	Report	Score by quarters: 5–1, 5–3, 5–2, 3–3			Avery Aquatic Center; Stanford, California
May 10, 2019; 6:30 p.m.	Report	Aria Fischer 5 Madison Berggren 4 Makenzie Fischer 2 Kat Klass 2 Madison Stamen 2 Chloe Harbilas 1 Sarah Klass 1 Mackenzie Wiley 1	Goals	Kyra Christmas 2 Viktoria Szmodics 2 Savannah Fitzgerald 2 Truly Dorland 1 Viktoria Tamas 1 Ana Martinez do Amaral 1	Avery Aquatic Center; Stanford, California

May 10, 2019; 8:15 p.m.	Report	No. 3 UCLA	13–7	Michigan	Avery Aquatic Center; Stanford, California
May 10, 2019; 8:15 p.m.	Report	Score by quarters: 4–3, 4–2, 2–2, 3–0			Avery Aquatic Center; Stanford, California
May 10, 2019; 8:15 p.m.	Report	Maddie Musselman 4 Lizette Rozeboom 4 Bronte Halligan 3 Kelsey Blacker 1 Rachel Whitelegge 1	Goals	Maddy Steere 2 Julia Sellers 2 Sofie Pontre 1 Abby Andrews 1 Maddie O'Reilly 1	Avery Aquatic Center; Stanford, California

=== Semifinals ===
May 11, 2019; 6:00 p.m.	Report	No. 1 USC	10–8 (OT)	No. 4 California	Avery Aquatic Center; Stanford, California
May 11, 2019; 6:00 p.m.	Report	Score by quarters: 3–2, 2–2, 1–1, 1–2 OT: 3–1			Avery Aquatic Center; Stanford, California
May 11, 2019; 6:00 p.m.	Report	Paige Hauschild 3 Alejandra Aznar 2 Maud Megens 1 Tilly Kearns 1 Grace Tehaney 1 Bayley Weber 1 Mireia Guiral 1	Goals	Brigit Mulder 2 Lauren Charter 1 Emma Wright 1 Sarah Siepker 1 Claire Sonne 1 Kitty Lynn Joustra 1 Elli Protopapas 1	Avery Aquatic Center; Stanford, California

May 11, 2019; 8:00 p.m.	Report	No. 2 Stanford	8–7 (OT)	No. 3 UCLA	Avery Aquatic Center; Stanford, California
May 11, 2019; 8:00 p.m.	Report	Score by quarters: 4–0, 1–2, 0–3, 1–1 OT: 2–1			Avery Aquatic Center; Stanford, California
May 11, 2019; 8:00 p.m.	Report	Aria Fischer 5 Makenzie Fischer 1 Kat Klass 1 Ryann Neushul 1	Goals	Maddie Musselman 2 Lexi Liebowitz 2 Rachel Whitelegge 1 Roxy Wheaton 1 Val Ayala 1	Avery Aquatic Center; Stanford, California

=== National Championship ===
May 12, 2019; 6:00 p.m.	Report	No. 1 USC	8–9	No. 2 Stanford	Avery Aquatic Center; Stanford, California
May 12, 2019; 6:00 p.m.	Report	Score by quarters: 2–2, 3–3, 3–3, 0–1			Avery Aquatic Center; Stanford, California
May 12, 2019; 6:00 p.m.	Report	Mireia Guiral 4 Maud Megens 2 Tilly Kearns 1 Kelsey McIntosh 1	Goals	Makenzie Fischer 3 Aria Fischer 2 Ryann Neushul 2 Kat Klass 1 Hannah Shabb 1	Avery Aquatic Center; Stanford, California

== Tournament awards ==
All–tournament first team
Player	Team
Emalia Eichelberger	Stanford
Aria Fischer	Stanford
Makenzie Fischer	Stanford
Paige Hauschild	USC
Maud Megens	USC
Maddie Musselman	UCLA
Ryann Neushul	Stanford

All–tournament second team
Player	Team
Mireia Guiral	USC
Bronte Halligan	UCLA
Kitty Lynn Joustra	California
Kat Klass	Stanford
Amanda Longan	USC
Denise Mammolito	USC
Emma Wright	California

Tournament MVP
Makenzie Fischer
Stanford
