= 2021 NCAA Women's Water Polo Championship =

Collegiate water polo championship

Tournament details
- Dates: May 14–16, 2021
- Teams: 10

Final positions
- Champions: USC Trojans
- Runners-up: UCLA Bruins

The 2021 NCAA National Collegiate Women's Water Polo Championship was the 20th edition of the NCAA Women's Water Polo Championship, the annual tournament to decide the championship of NCAA women's collegiate water polo. The tournament was held May 14–16, 2021, at the Spieker Aquatics Center in Los Angeles, California, which was hosted by the University of California, Los Angeles (UCLA).

== Qualifying teams ==
The field of teams was revealed in a selection show on May 3, 2021. Seven conferences were granted automatic qualification to the championship: the Big West Conference, Collegiate Water Polo Association, Golden Coast Conference, Metro Atlantic Athletic Conference, Mountain Pacific Sports Federation, Southern California Intercollegiate Athletic Conference, and Western Water Polo Association. Three additional teams gained entry into the tournament with at-large bids, with all of them coming from the MPSF.

Seed	School	Conference	Record	Berth	Source
4	Arizona State	MPSF	13–11	At-large	
	Cal Lutheran	SCIAC	7–0	Automatic	
	Fresno State	Golden Coast	12–5	Automatic	
	Hawaii	Big West	11–1	Automatic	
	Marist	MAAC	8–0	Automatic	
	Michigan	CWPA	21–4	Automatic	
	Salem	WWPA	18–11	Automatic	
2	Stanford	MPSF	12–5	At-large	
3	UCLA	MPSF	13–4	At-large	
1	USC	MPSF	19–1	Automatic	

== Schedule and results ==
All times Pacific (UTC-07:00).

Game	Time	Matchup	Score	TV	Attendance
First Round – Wednesday, May 12
1	11:00 a.m.	Marist vs. Salem	9–8	P12+ UCLA	
2	1:00 p.m.	Fresno State vs. Cal Lutheran	15–7	P12+ UCLA	
Quarterfinals – Friday, May 14
3	12:00 p.m.	No. 1 USC vs. Marist	24–5	NCAA.com	
4	2:00 p.m.	No. 4 Arizona State vs. Michigan	9–5	NCAA.com	
5	4:00 p.m.	No. 2 Stanford vs. Fresno State	16–9	NCAA.com	
6	6:00 p.m.	No. 3 UCLA vs. Hawaii	12–7	NCAA.com	
Semifinals – Saturday, May 15
7	3:00 p.m.	No. 1 USC vs. No. 4 Arizona State	10–4	NCAA.com	
8	5:00 p.m.	No. 2 Stanford vs. No. 3 UCLA	7–9	NCAA.com	
Championship – Sunday, May 16
9	3:00 p.m.	No. 1 USC vs. No. 3 UCLA	18-9	NCAA.com	

== Tournament bracket ==
Play–in games Tuesday, May 12, 2021
Marist	9
Salem	8
Fresno State	15
Cal Lutheran	7

Quarterfinals; Friday, May 14, 2021
1	USC	24
Marist	5
4	Arizona State	9
Michigan	5
2	Stanford	16
Fresno State	9
3	UCLA	12
Hawaii	7

Semifinals; Saturday, May 15, 2021
1	USC	10
4	Arizona State	4
2	Stanford	7
3	UCLA	9

Championship; Sunday, May 16, 2021
1	USC	18
3	UCLA	9

== Game summaries ==
=== Opening round ===
May 12, 2021; 11:00 a.m.	Marist	9–8	Salem	Spieker Aquatics Center – Los Angeles, California; Referees: Gary Hull, Peter Sophabmixay
May 12, 2021; 11:00 a.m.	Score by quarters: 2–2, 1–3, 3–1, 3–2			Spieker Aquatics Center – Los Angeles, California; Referees: Gary Hull, Peter Sophabmixay

May 12, 2021; 1:00 p.m.	Fresno State	15–7	Cal Lutheran	Spieker Aquatics Center – Los Angeles, California; Referees: Mike Stuart, Jennifer McCall
May 12, 2021; 1:00 p.m.	Score by quarters: 4–1, 1–2, 4–2, 6–2			Spieker Aquatics Center – Los Angeles, California; Referees: Mike Stuart, Jennifer McCall
