= NCAA women's water polo championship =

Annual college water polo tournament

- Association: NCAA
- Sport: Collegiate Water polo
- Founded: 2001; 25 years ago
- Division: Division I and Division II
- No. of teams: 9 (currently)
- Country: United States
- Most recent champion: USC (7th title)
- Most titles: Stanford (10)
- Website: NCAA.com

The NCAA women's water polo championship is the annual tournament that is hosted by the NCAA to determine the team national champion of women's collegiate water polo among its members in the United States, held each year since 2001. UCLA won the first title by defeating Stanford 5–4.

Unlike most NCAA sports, only one National Collegiate championship is held each season with teams from Division I and Division II. Division III received their own in the sport starting in 2022.

Stanford has been the most successful program, with 10 championships; UCLA has the second most (8), followed by USC (7). One of these three California schools has won the championship every year since the tournament began in 2001.

While the tournament often includes teams from around the country, most programs are located within the state of California, and no school from outside California has ever surpassed third place or participated in the NCAA Women's Water Polo Championship game. Indeed, only four times has a school other than Stanford, UCLA, or USC participated in the championship game: Loyola Marymount lost to USC in 2004 and California lost to Stanford in 2011, lost to UCLA in 2024, and lost to USC in 2026.

== Format ==
Seven conferences have teams competing in women's water polo: the Big West Conference, the Collegiate Water Polo Association (CWPA), the single-sport Golden Coast Conference, the Metro Atlantic Athletic Conference (MAAC), the Mountain Pacific Sports Federation (MPSF), the Southern California Intercollegiate Athletic Conference (SCIAC) and the Western Water Polo Association (WWPA). Some teams compete at Division III, either as members of the Southern California Intercollegiate Athletic Conference or as an independent. Teams qualify by either winning their respective conference tournament or receiving one of the few at large bids available.

== Champions ==
Year	National Champion	Score	Runner-up	Host or site
2001	UCLA	5–4	Stanford	Stanford University, Avery Aquatic Center, Stanford, California
2002	Stanford	8–4	UCLA	USC, McDonald's Swim Stadium, Los Angeles, California
2003	UCLA (2)	4–3	Stanford	UC San Diego, Canyonview Pool, La Jolla, California
2004	USC	10–8	Loyola Marymount	Stanford University, Avery Aquatic Center, Stanford, California
2005	UCLA (3)	3–2	Stanford	University of Michigan, Canham Natatorium, Ann Arbor, Michigan
2006	UCLA (4)	9–8	USC	UC Davis, Schaal Aquatics Center, Davis, California
2007	UCLA (5)	5–4	Stanford	Long Beach State, Joint Forces Training Base, Los Alamitos, California
2008	UCLA (6)	6–3	USC	Stanford University, Avery Aquatic Center, Stanford, California
2009	UCLA (7)	5–4	USC	University of Maryland, Eppley Recreation Center Natatorium, College Park, Maryland
2010	USC (2)	10–9	Stanford	San Diego State, Aztec Aquaplex, San Diego, California
2011	Stanford (2)	9–5	California	University of Michigan, Canham Natatorium, Ann Arbor, Michigan
2012	Stanford (3)	6–4	USC	San Diego State, Aztec Aquaplex, San Diego, California
2013	USC (3)	10–9 ^{5OT}	Stanford	Harvard University, Blodgett Pool, Cambridge, Massachusetts
2014	Stanford (4)	9–5	UCLA	USC, Uytengsu Aquatics Center, Los Angeles, California
2015	Stanford (5)	7–6	UCLA	Stanford University, Avery Aquatic Center, Stanford, California
2016	USC (4)	8–7	Stanford	UCLA, Spieker Aquatics Center, Los Angeles, California
2017	Stanford (6)	8–7	UCLA	IUPUI, Indiana University Natatorium, Indianapolis, Indiana
2018	USC (5)	5–4	Stanford	USC, Uytengsu Aquatics Center, Los Angeles, California
2019	Stanford (7)	9–8	USC	Stanford, Avery Aquatic Center, Stanford, California
2020	Cancelled due to the coronavirus pandemic			University of the Pacific, Chris Kjeldsen Pool Complex, Stockton, California
2021	USC (6)	18–9	UCLA	UCLA, Spieker Aquatics Center, Los Angeles, California
2022	Stanford (8)	10–7	USC	Michigan, Canham Natatorium, Ann Arbor, Michigan
2023	Stanford (9)	11–9	USC	University of the Pacific, Chris Kjeldsen Pool Complex, Stockton, California
2024	UCLA (8)	7–4	California	California, Spieker Aquatics Complex, Berkeley, CA
2025	Stanford (10)	11-7	USC	IUPUI, Indiana University Natatorium, Indianapolis, Indiana
2026	USC (7)	10–9	California	UC San Diego, Canyonview Aquatic Center, La Jolla, CA

== Team titles ==
Schools that have won the NCAA Championship
10, 8, 7

Team	#	Years
Stanford	10	2002, 2011, 2012, 2014, 2015, 2017, 2019, 2022, 2023, 2025
UCLA	8	2001, 2003, 2005, 2006, 2007, 2008, 2009, 2024
USC	7	2004, 2010, 2013, 2016, 2018, 2021, 2026

== Result by school and year ==
28 teams have appeared in the NCAA Tournament in at least one year starting with 2001 (the initial year that the post-season tournament was under the auspices of the NCAA). The results for all years are shown in this table below.

The code in each cell represents the furthest the team made it in the respective tournament:

- • Opening/Play-in Round (since 2014)
- QF Quarterfinals (since 2005)
- SF Semifinals
- RU National Runner-up
- CH National Champion

School	Conference	#	SF	CG	CH	01	02	03	04	05	06	07	08	09	10	11	12	13	14	15	16	17	18	19	21	22	23	24	25	26
Stanford	MPSF	25	25	18	10	RU	CH	RU	SF	RU	SF	RU	SF	SF	RU	CH	CH	RU	CH	CH	RU	CH	RU	CH	SF	CH	CH	SF	CH	SF
UCLA	MPSF	24	23	13	8	CH	RU	CH		CH	CH	CH	CH	CH	QF	SF	SF	SF	RU	RU	SF	RU	SF	SF	RU	SF	SF	CH	SF	SF
USC	MPSF	22	21	15	7				CH	SF	RU	SF	RU	RU	CH	SF	RU	CH	SF	SF	CH	SF	CH	RU	CH	RU	RU	QF	RU	CH
California	MPSF	12	10	3	-										SF	RU			SF	SF		SF	SF	SF		SF	QF	RU	QF	RU
Loyola Marymount	GCC	11	5	1	-	SF	SF	SF	RU	QF		QF		QF	SF		QF												QF	QF
Hawaii	Big West	10	6	-	-					SF	SF			SF				SF		QF				QF	QF			SF	SF	QF
Michigan	CWPA	11	2	-	-		SF			QF			QF	QF	QF						SF	QF	QF	QF	QF	QF				
UC Irvine	Big West	8	1	-	-											QF	SF		QF	QF		QF	QF			QF	QF			
Princeton	CWPA	5	1	-	-												QF	QF		QF							SF	QF		
Indiana	MPSF	3	1	-	-			SF								QF			QF											
Hartwick	defunct	3	1	-	-				SF		QF	QF																		
San Diego State	GCC	3	1	-	-							SF	QF								QF									
Arizona State	MPSF	3	1	-	-														QF		QF				SF					
UC Davis	GCC	2	1	-	-						QF		SF																	
Brown	CWPA	1	1	-	-	SF																								
Wagner	Metro	12	-	-	-					QF		QF							•	•	•	QF	QF	•		QF		QF	QF	QF
Pomona–Pitzer	SCIAC	8	-	-	-							QF	QF		QF		QF	QF	•			•	•							
UC San Diego	Big West	8	-	-	-											QF		QF	QF	QF	QF	•	•	QF						
Marist	Metro	5	-	-	-						QF		QF	QF	QF										QF					
Fresno State	GCC	4	-	-	-																				QF	QF	QF	QF		
Cal Lutheran	SCIAC	3	-	-	-									QF										•	•					
Iona	Metro	3	-	-	-											QF	QF	QF												
Pacific	GCC	3	-	-	-																	QF	QF	QF						
Harvard	CWPA	2	-	-	-																								QF	QF
Whittier	SCIAC	2	-	-	-															•	•									
Salem (WV)	WWPA	2	-	-	-																				•	•				
Biola	WWPA	2	-	-	-																						•	•		
Redlands	SCIAC	1	-	-	-					QF																				
Claremont-Mudd-Scripps	SCIAC	1	-	-	-						QF																			
UC Santa Barbara	Big West	1	-	-	-																QF									
LIU	Metro	1	-	-	-																						QF			
McKendree	WWPA	1	-	-	-																								•	
Concordia Irvine	WWPA	1	-	-	-																									•

== Tournaments ==
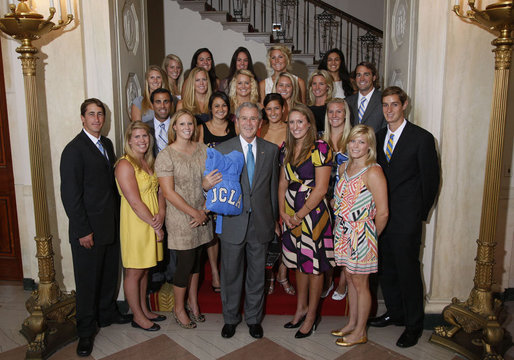
The University of California-Los Angeles Bruins are honored at the White House by President of the United States George W. Bush in June 2008 for their winning the 2008 Division I national championship.

=== 2018 ===
The NCAA Women's Water Polo Championship was held on May 8–13, 2018 at the USC Uytengsu Aquatics Center, Los Angeles, California. Ten teams were selected to participate in the annual event. Conference champions from the Big West, CWPA, Golden Coast Conference, MAAC, MPSF, SCIAC and WWPA are represented with the seven automatic bids. They were joined by three at-large teams, with play-in games ahead of the tournament.

Conference Champions:

- Big West - UC-Irvine
- CWPA - Michigan
- Golden Coast - Pacific
- MAAC - Wagner
- MPSF - USC
- SCIAC - Pomona-Pitzer
- WWPA - UC-San Diego
- at-large teams - Stanford, UCLA, California

Opening Round (May 8): Wagner def. UC-San Diego 10–7, UC Irvine def. Pomona-Pitzer 16–2

First Round (May 11): No. 1 USC def. Wagner 12–5; No. 4 UCLA def. Pacific 8–4; No. 2 Stanford def. UC Irvine 14–8; No. 3 California def. Michigan 13–6

Semi-finals (May 12): No. 1 USC def. No. 4 UCLA 10–6; No. 2 Stanford def. No. 3 California 11–7

Championship (May 13): No. 1 USC def. No. 2 Stanford 5-4

=== 2017 ===
The NCAA Women's Water Polo Championship was held on May 12–14, 2017 at the IU Natatorium; Indianapolis, IN. Ten teams were selected to participate in the annual event. Conference champions from the Big West, CWPA, Golden Coast Conference, MAAC, MPSF, SCIAC and WWPA are represented with the seven automatic bids. They are joined by three at-large teams, with play-in games ahead of the tournament.

Conference Champions:

- Big West - UC-Irvine
- CWPA - Michigan
- Golden Coast - Pacific
- MAAC - Wagner
- MPSF - UCLA
- SCIAC - Pomona-Pitzer
- WWPA - UC-San Diego

Opening Round (May 6): Wagner def. UC-San Diego 6–5, Pacific def. Pomona-Pitzer 11–5

First Round (May 12): No. 1 UCLA def. Wagner 17–2; California def. No. 4 UC Irvine 9–7; No. 2 Stanford def. Pacific 13–6; No. 3 USC def. Michigan 12–6

Semi-finals (May 13): No. 1 UCLA def. Cal 14–11; No. 2 Stanford def. No. 3 USC 11–10

Championship (May 14, 3:00 PM ET): No. 2 Stanford def. No. 1 UCLA 8-7

Maggie Steffens of Stanford, who scored the winning goal against UCLA with 9 seconds left, was named the tournament's most valuable player.

=== 2016 ===
The NCAA Women's Water Polo Championship was held on May 13–15, 2016 with UCLA, Los Angeles hosting. Eight teams were selected to participate in the annual event. Conference champions from the Big West, CWPA, Golden Coast Conference, MAAC, MPSF, SCIAC and WWPA were represented with the seven automatic bids. They were joined by three at-large teams, with play-in games conducted on May 10, 2016.

Play-in games (May 10, 2016, Canyonview Aquatic Center at the University of California, San Diego): San Diego State def. Wagner 7–4, UC San Diego def. Whitter 11–7

Tournament First Round games (May 13, 2016): UCLA def. UC San Diego 17–4, Stanford def. UC Santa Barbara 12–5, Southern California def. San Diego State 12–3, Michigan def. Arizona State 5-4

Semi-finals (May 14, 2016): Southern California def. Michigan 9–6, Stanford def. UCLA 7-4

Championship (May 15, 2016): Southern California def. Stanford 8–7

=== 2015 ===
The NCAA Women's Water Polo Championship was held on May 8–10, 2015 with Stanford, Stanford, CA hosting. Eight teams participated in the event. As has been the case since 2011, conference champions from the MPSF, WWPA, SCIAC, CWPA, MAAC, and Big West represented the six automatic bids. They were joined by four at-large teams, with play-in games being conducted on May 2: UC San Diego (18-18) def. Whittier (21-14) 17–11, Princeton (29-3) def. Wagner (25-8) 12–2.

Tournament First Round games (May 8, 2015): UCLA (24-2) def. UC San Diego 9–2, California (19-7) def. UCI (19-8) 6–5, Southern Cal (22-5) def. Hawaii (18-9) 14–7, Stanford (23-2) def. Princeton (30-4) 7–2.

Semi-finals (May 9, 2015): UCLA def. California 9–5, Stanford def. Southern Cal 9–8

Championship (May 10, 2015): Stanford def. UCLA, 7–6

=== 2014 ===
The NCAA Women's Water Polo Championship was held on May 9–11, 2014 with USC, Los Angeles hosting. Eight teams participated. Play-in games among four at-large teams were conducted May 3 on the campuses of the higher-seeded teams, with No. 8 seed Indiana defeating No. 9 seed Wagner 11–6, and No. 7 seed UC San Diego defeating No. 10 seed Pomona Pitzer 13–9.

Tournament First Round games (May 9, 2014): No. 1 seed Stanford def. No. 8 seed Indiana 18–2, No. 2 seed UCLA def. No. 7 seed UC San Diego 12–8, No. 3 seed USC def. No. 6 seed UCI 14–11, No. 4 seed Cal def. No. 5 seed ASU 7–4

Semi-finals (May 10, 2014): [1] Stanford def. [4] California 12–8, [2] UCLA def. [3] USC 5–3

Championship (May 11, 2014): [1] Stanford def. [2] UCLA 9–5

Annika Dries of Stanford was named the tournament's most outstanding player.

=== 2013 ===
The NCAA Women's Water Polo Championship was held on May 10–12, 2013 with Harvard University, Cambridge, MA hosting. Eight teams participated. Conference champions from the MPSF, WWPA, SCIAC, CWPA, MAAC, and Big West were joined by two at-large teams.

Tournament First Round games (May 10, 2013): No. 2 seed Stanford (27-2) def. No. 7 seed Iona (21-8) 20–3; No. 3 seed UCLA (26-6) def. No. 6 seed Princeton (26-5) 8–6; No. 1 seed Southern California (24-1) def. Pomona-Pitzer (18-16) 27–1; No. 4 seed Hawaii (21-9) def. No. 5 seed UC San Diego (25-13) 13–6

Semi-finals (May 11, 2013): No. 2 seed Stanford def. No. 3 seed UCLA 5–3; No. 1 seed Southern California def. No. 4 seed Hawaii 16–9

Championship (May 12, 2013): No. 1 seed Southern California def. No. 2 seed Stanford, 10-9^{5OT}

=== 2012 ===
The tournament was held at the SDSU's Aztec Aquaplex in San Diego, California with automatic bids for the MPSF, CWPA, Big West, MAAC, WWPA and SCIAC conferences. The three-day championships on May 11–13, 2012, also had two at-large teams.

Tournament First Round games (May 11, 2012): No. 1 Stanford (23-2) def. No. 8 Pomona-Pitzer (21-16) 17–5; No. 2 UCLA (21-3) def. No. 7 Iona (24-11) 14–3; No. 3 Southern California (21-5) def. No. 6 Princeton (28-4) 14–2; No. 4 UC Irvine (24-6) def. No. 5 Loyola Marymount (20-9) 8–6.

Semi-finals (May 12, 2012: No. 1 Stanford def. No. 4 UC Irvine 12–3; No. 3 Southern California def. No. 2 UCLA 12–10.

Championship (May 13, 2012): No. 1 Stanford def. No. 3 Southern California 6–4.

=== 2011 ===
The tournament was held at the University of Michigan's Canham Natatorium in Ann Arbor, Michigan with automatic bids for the MPSF (Stanford), CWPA (Indiana), Big West (UCI), MAAC (Iona), WWPA (UC San Diego) and SCIAC (Redlands). The three-day championships on May 13–15, 2011, also had two at-large teams.

Tournament First Round games: No. 1 Stanford (25-1) def. No. 8 Iona College/University of Redlands (play-in winner) 22–7; No. 4 USC (18-6) def. No. 5 UCI (21-8) 14–9; No. 3 UCLA (24-6) def. No. 6 Indiana (21-8) 8–5; No. 2 California (24-4) def. No. 7 UC San Diego (17-18) 13–5.

Semi-finals: No. 2 California def. No. 3 UCLA 7–4; No. 1 Stanford def. No. 4 Southern California 8–4.

Championship: No. 1 Stanford defeated No. 2 California 9-5 for its second national title.

All Tournament First Team: Amber Oland, Stanford; Annika Dries, Stanford; Emily Csikos, Cal; Kim Krueger, Stanford; Patricia Jancso, USC; Melissa Seidemann, Stanford; Dana Ochsner, Cal; Priscilla Orozco, UCLA

All Tournament Second Team: Stephane Peckham, Cal; Jakie Kohli, Indiana; Joelle Bekhazi, USC; KK Clark, UCLA; Cortney Collyer, UC Irvine; Jessy Cardey, UC Irvine; Maggie Wood, Iona; Kelly Easterday, UCLA

Tournament MVP: Annika Dries, Stanford

=== 2010 ===
The tournament field was announced on Monday, May 3, 2010, with the championship tournament on May 14–16 at San Diego State University's Aztec Aquaplex. Teams that received automatic bids were UCLA (MPSF), Michigan (CWPA), Marist (MAAC), Loyola Marymount (WWPA) and Pomona-Pitzer (SCIAC). Stanford, Cal and USC of MPSF received at-large bids.

Tournament Bracket: #1 Stanford (24-2) def. #8 Pomona-Pitzer (18-14) 23–3; #2 USC (22-3) def. #7 Marist (18-14) 20–5; #6 Loyola Marymount (27-4) def. #3 UCLA (20-7) 5–4; #4 Cal (24-8) def. #5 Michigan (32-6) 12–8.

Semi-finals: #1 Stanford def. #4 Cal 6–3; #2 USC def. #6 Loyola Marymount 10–6.

Southern California defeated Stanford in the title game 10-9 for its second national title in school history.

=== 2009 ===
The following conferences and institutions received automatic qualification for the 2009 championships, which were played on May 8–10: Collegiate Water Polo Association, Michigan; Metro Atlantic Athletic Conference, Marist; Mountain Pacific Sports Federation, USC; Southern California Intercollegiate Athletic Conference, Cal Lutheran; and Western Water Polo Association, Loyola Marymount. The following institutions received at-large bids to the championship field: Stanford, UCLA, and Hawaii.

The first-round games: #1 seed USC (24-1) def. #8 Cal Lutheran (19-12) 22–2; #2 Stanford (24-3) def. #7 Marist (18-13) 21–5; #3 UCLA (22-6) def. #6 Michigan (33-8) 13–6; and #4 Hawaii (18-8) def. # 5 Loyola Marymount (24-7) 11–7.

Semi-finals: #1 USC def. #4 Hawaii 17–5; #3 UCLA def. #2 Stanford 12–11.

The UCLA Bruins women's team (3rd seeded) battled the #1 rated USC Trojans for the national championship on Sunday, May 10, 2009, at College Park, Maryland. With two goals from Tanya Gandy in the first minute of the game, UCLA won a record fifth consecutive crown, 11th national title and 7th NCAA crown, by a score of 5–4. Gandy earned the NCAA Tournament's most valuable player honor.

== See also ==
- Pre-NCAA Intercollegiate Women's Water Polo Champions
- NCAA men's water polo championship
