= Spieker Aquatics Center =

Stadium in Los Angeles, California, United States

Coordinates: 34.0749°N 118.4506°W

The Spieker Aquatics Center is a 2,500-capacity stadium in Los Angeles, California used by UCLA water polo, swimming, and diving teams. The $14-million center was built in 2009 and is named for Tod and Catherine Spieker. Tod was a student-athlete at UCLA, competing from 1968 to 1971 in swimming.

The Dirks Pool at Spieker Aquatics Center is named after Carolyn Dirks.

The athletic teams using the facilities have won 20 NCAA national championships. Men's swimming and diving won in 1982; men's water polo team were champions in 1969, 1971–72, 1995–96, 1999–2000, 2004, 2014–15 and 2017; and the women's water polo team captured the title in 2001, 2003, 2005–09 and 2024.

The center features a 52-meter, all deep water pool with a diving bulkhead; platform for diving as well as one-meter and three-meter boards; men's and women's locker rooms; permanent seating for 800 people, with the ability to seat 1,700 additional spectators in temporary seating; and a "Wall of Champions" showcasing accomplishments of past teams. It also has an 8'6" x 15'6" video display board.

== Notable events ==
The 2010 MPSF Women's Water Polo Championship Tournament was held April 30-May 2, 2010 at the Spieker Aquatics Center.

In 2011, the AT&T National Diving Championships were held at the center (August 9–14). 125 divers competed for 10 national titles and to represent the United States at the 2011 Pan American Games. Athletes also qualified for the 2012 US Olympic Team Trials. NBC Sports and Universal Sports broadcast the championships from Westwood. Olympian diver Dr. Sammy Lee was the awards presenter.

The 2011 MPSF Men's Water Polo Championship Tournament was held at UCLA from November 25 through November 27. The USA Men's water polo team held a training game vs. the Hungary team at the Spieker Aquatics Center on May 31, 2012, prior to the 2012 Olympics.

In 2015, the NCAA Men's Water Polo Championship was held on December 6, 2015, and the UCLA Bruins defeated the USC Trojans 10–7 for their second consecutive national title. The 2016 NCAA Women's Water Polo Championship was held at Spieker Aquatics Center.

The 2016 NCAA Women's Water Polo Championship was held May 13–15, 2016, with the USC Trojans defeating the Stanford Cardinal, 8–7. Also the 2021 NCAA Women's Water Polo Championship took place at the aquatics center.

The 2021 NCAA Men's Water Polo Championship was held December 4–5, 2021, California defeated USC 13-12 for the national championship.

The 2024 MPSF Men's Water Polo Championship Tournament was held at UCLA from November 22 through November 24, 2024.

The 2025 MPSF Women's Water Polo Championship Tournament was held at UCLA from April 25 through April 27, 2005.
