= 2016 NCAA Women's Water Polo Championship =

Tournament details
- Dates: May 10, 13-15
- Teams: 10

Final positions
- Champions: USC Trojans
- Runners-up: Stanford Cardinal
- Third place: UCLA Bruins
- Fourth place: Michigan Wolverines

Tournament statistics
- Matches played: 14

Awards
- Best player: Stephania Haralabidis

The 2016 NCAA Women's Water Polo Championship was the 16th annual tournament to determine the national champion of NCAA women's collegiate water polo. Tournament matches were played at the UCLA Spieker Aquatics Center in Los Angeles, California from May 13–15, 2016. The USC Trojans defeated the 2015 champions, the Stanford Cardinal, 8-7 to win their fifth national title, while finishing the season 26-0.

== Qualification ==
Since there is only one NCAA championship for women's water polo, all women's water polo programs, whether from Division I, Division II, or Division III, are eligible. For the first time, ten teams participated in the tournament. The automatic qualifiers came from the following conferences: Big West Conference, Collegiate Water Polo Association, Golden Coast Conference, Metro Atlantic Athletic Conference, Mountain Pacific Sports Federation, Southern California Intercollegiate Athletic Conference, and Western Water Polo Association. Three additional teams were selected at large without geographical restrictions by the selection committee. The four lowest seeded teams played in the two play-in games on Tuesday, May 10.

=== Play-in games ===
- Site: RIMAC (UC San Diego), San Diego, California

Play-in game
Whittier College	7
UC San Diego	11

Play-in game
San Diego State	7
Wagner College	4

== Tournament bracket ==
- Site: Spieker Aquatics Center (UCLA), Los Angeles, California

Fifth place
UC San Diego	2
Arizona State	8
Seventh place
UC Santa Barbara	8
San Diego State	2

Consolation semifinals
UC San Diego	10
UC Santa Barbara	5
San Diego State	5
Arizona State	7

First round
UC San Diego	4
UCLA	17
UC Santa Barbara	5
Stanford	12
San Diego State	3
USC	12
Arizona State	4
Michigan	5

Championship semifinals
UCLA	4
Stanford	7
USC	9
Michigan	6

Championship
Stanford	7
USC	8
Third place
UCLA	5
Michigan	4

== All Tournament Team ==
TBD

== See also ==
- NCAA Men's Water Polo Championship

== Notes ==
- Game time each day: Noon, 1:45 p.m., 3:30 p.m., 5:15 p.m. (local time)
