= California Baptist University =

Baptist university in Riverside, California, US

Coordinates: 33°55′48″N 117°25′30″W

- Former name: California Baptist College (1950–1998)
- Motto: Live Your Purpose
- Type: Private university
- Established: 1950; 76 years ago
- Religious affiliation: California Southern Baptist Convention
- Endowment: $157.6 million (2024)
- President: Ronald L. Ellis
- Students: 12,466 (Fall 2025)
- Location: Riverside, California, United States
- Campus: Suburban, 160 acres (65 ha)
- Colors: Navy blue and gold
- Nickname: Lancers
- Sporting affiliations: NCAA Division I, Big West Conference; Western Water Polo Association (men's water polo); Golden Coast Conference (women's water polo)
- Website: calbaptist.edu

California Baptist University (Cal Baptist or CBU) is a private university in Riverside, California, United States. Founded in 1950 as California Baptist College, it is affiliated with the California Southern Baptist Convention, an organization affiliated with the Southern Baptist Convention. CBU is accredited by the WASC Senior College and University Commission.

== History ==
=== 1950s through 1990s ===
Founded in 1950 as California Baptist College in El Monte, California by the Los Angeles Southern Baptist Association, the new college enrolled 120 students during its first year under the leadership of the first president, P. Boyd Smith. In 1953, the college moved under the wing of the California Southern Baptist Convention, the same year that the first edition of the Angelos, the college yearbook, was published. In 1954, the college received its charter from the State of California and eight students became the first to earn undergraduate degrees from CBC.

Soon the college outgrew its facilities, and in 1955 it moved its campus to the then-rural city of Riverside, California. The school's new 75.6-acre campus was already equipped with constructed buildings that could be used for offices, classrooms, and living areas. What is now known as the Annie Gabriel Library, was the first to be built in 1921. In 1927, the original administration building was constructed whereas the W.E. James Building was built in 1934. The building which now houses the ceramics studio and boiler was constructed in 1938. In 1958, the college named its second president, Loyed Simmons.

The 1960s and 1970s brought significant milestones. In 1961, CBC received full regional accreditation from the Western College Association, now known as WSCUC. In 1964, the college began expanding with the construction of the Lancer Arms Apartments as enrollment reached 500. In 1968, Smith Hall and Simmons Hall were constructed and dedicated, named in honor of the college's first two presidents. In 1973, the Wallace Book of Life Building was dedicated. In 1979, the college's $800,000 note for the Riverside campus was paid.

The 1980s and 1990s marked continued academic growth for the college. In 1984, the first graduate degree was granted and accreditation was received from the National Association of Schools of Music. In 1986, the Board of Trustees voted to create the California Baptist College Development Foundation. In 1990, the first Evening College classes were offered in the High Desert, California.

In 1994, Ronald L. Ellis was named the fifth president of the college, when enrollment stood at 808 students. Under his leadership, enrollment grew to 1,000 by 1995, 1,500 by 1996, and 2,000 by 1997. In 1996, CBC became the first college on the West Coast to receive accreditation from the Association of College Business Schools and Programs (now ACBSP). In 1997, Mission Hall, the Fitness Center, Training Room, and Athletic Offices were constructed.

In September 1998, California Baptist College officially became California Baptist University. In this same year, U.S. News & World Report listed CBU among the top five regional liberal arts colleges for student-faculty ratio.

=== 2000s through present day ===
Between 2000 and 2020, CBU continued to grow in enrollment and academic offerings. Enrollment exceeded 4,700 students in 2010 and reached a record 7,144 in 2013. In 2015, fall enrollment reached 8,541, eclipsing the "8080 by 2020" enrollment goal five years ahead of schedule. In fall 2020, enrollment totaled 11,317 despite the coronavirus pandemic. That year, CBU honored 3,194 graduates in a virtual commencement ceremony.

To accommodate growth, CBU added new academic programs, student housing, and facilities. In 2001, the previously acquired Willow Wood Apartments and Pine Creek Villas were consolidated as University Place Apartments. The School of Music was established in 2002, and the Dr. Bonnie G. Metcalf School of Education followed in 2003. That same year, the Eugene and Billie Yeager University Center was completed, housing classrooms, administration offices, the cafeteria, computer labs, and faculty offices. In 2004, Phase I of The Cottages student housing was completed. The School of Nursing was established in 2005, and the School of Engineering was established in 2007.

CBU added its College of Allied Health (later renamed College of Health Science) in 2010. That same year, CBU was approved to begin the NCAA Division II membership process, joining the Pacific West Conference for competition beginning in 2011. In 2011, the campus expanded to 128 acres and the College of Architecture, Visual Arts and Design was established.

In 2013, the aviation science program launched its inaugural class, and FedEx Express donated a Boeing 727-200F to the program. On September 8, 2015, CBU offered its first doctoral degree, a Doctorate of Nursing Practice (DNP) through the School of Nursing. The 153,000-square-foot CBU Events Center opened in November 2017. The following year, the Dennis and Carol Troesh Engineering Building was opened. In 2017–18, CBU won its first-ever Learfield Directors' Cup and began its transition to NCAA Division I, joining the Western Athletic Conference.

CBU's newest student housing, Magnolia Crossing, opened for residents in fall 2020. In 2021, the Chronicle of Higher Education ranked CBU No. 7 among the fastest-growing colleges in the United States, reflecting 169% enrollment growth from 2009 through 2019. The CBU Soccer Stadium was completed and dedicated in 2022.

In 2023, CBU received the largest gift in its history — $28.5 million from Dale E. and Sarah Ann Fowler — and named its events center in their honor. In The Wall Street Journal's 2024 Best Colleges rankings, CBU tied for No. 1 in the nation for career preparedness and earned the No. 2 spot for best student experience. In 2024, the Baseball and Softball Clubhouse was completed and dedicated.

In fall 2025, CBU achieved record enrollment of 12,516 students, surpassing a goal of 12,000 that had been set in 2015.

=== Expulsion of Domaine Javier ===
On August 30, 2011, California Baptist University expelled incoming nursing student Domaine Javier for being a transgender woman. CBU claimed she had concealed her identity when applying to the school. Before attending classes, Javier revealed her identity on MTV's True Life, after which CBU expelled her. As a result, Javier's attorneys filed a lawsuit against the school on grounds of discrimination, citing California's Unruh Civil Rights Act. Javier also brought suit against the university for breach of contract. Riverside County Superior Court Judge Gloria Connor Trask ruled on July 11, 2014, that as a transgender person, Javier's application violated the university's moral code and the school was within its rights to expel her. Trask, however, ruled that the university should not have prohibited Javier from entering university businesses and services which were open to the public. Because of California Baptist's decision to bar Javier from their campus businesses, Judge Trask ordered the school to pay her $4,000 in statutory damages in addition to attorney's fees.

=== Presidents ===
Presidents of the institution have included:

- P. Boyd Smith, 1950 - 1958
- Loyed Simmons, 1958 – 1971
- James R. Staples, 1971 – 1984
- Russell R. Tuck, 1984 – 1994
- Ronald L. Ellis, 1994 – present

== Campus ==
Campus

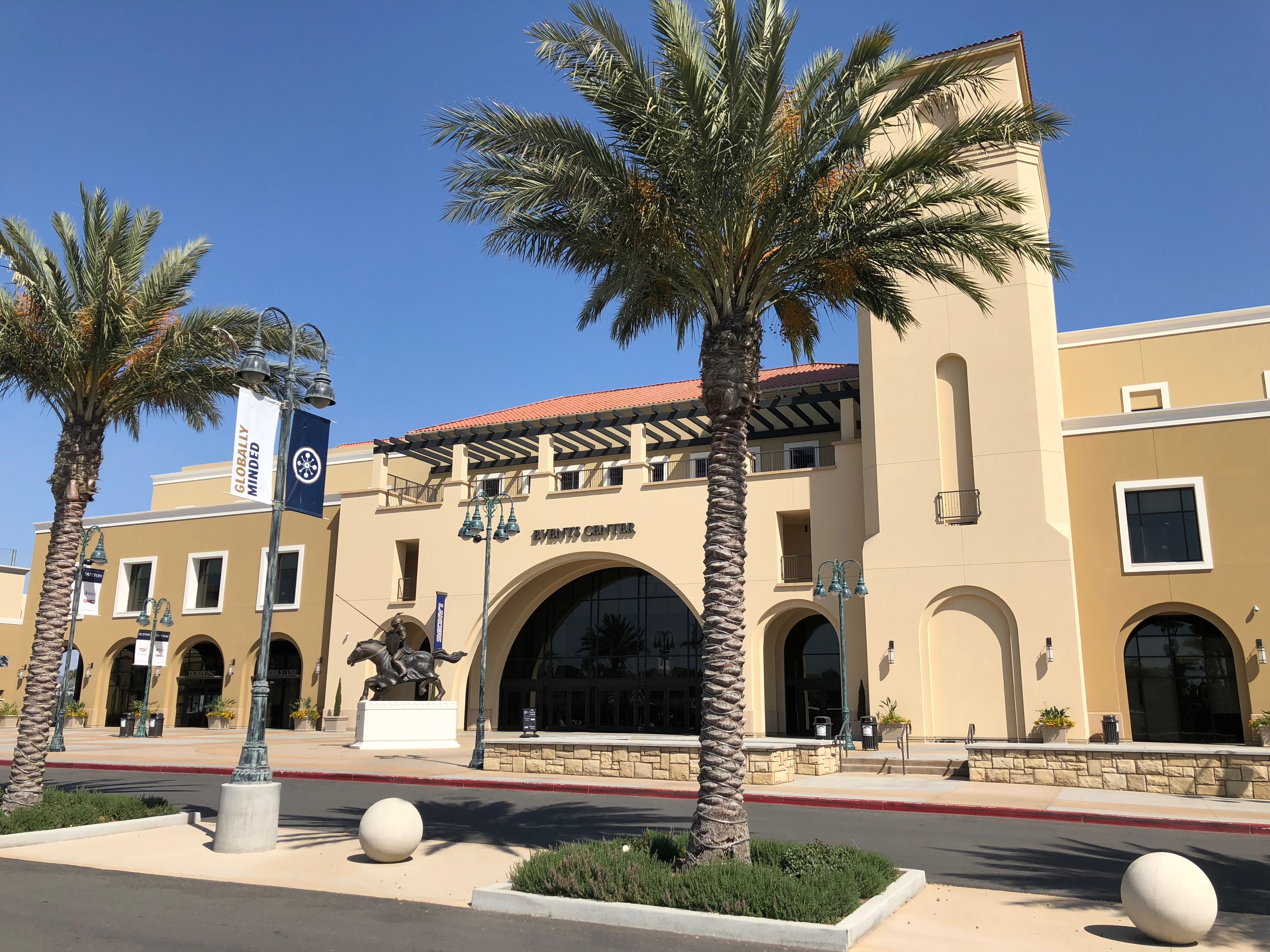
Events Center

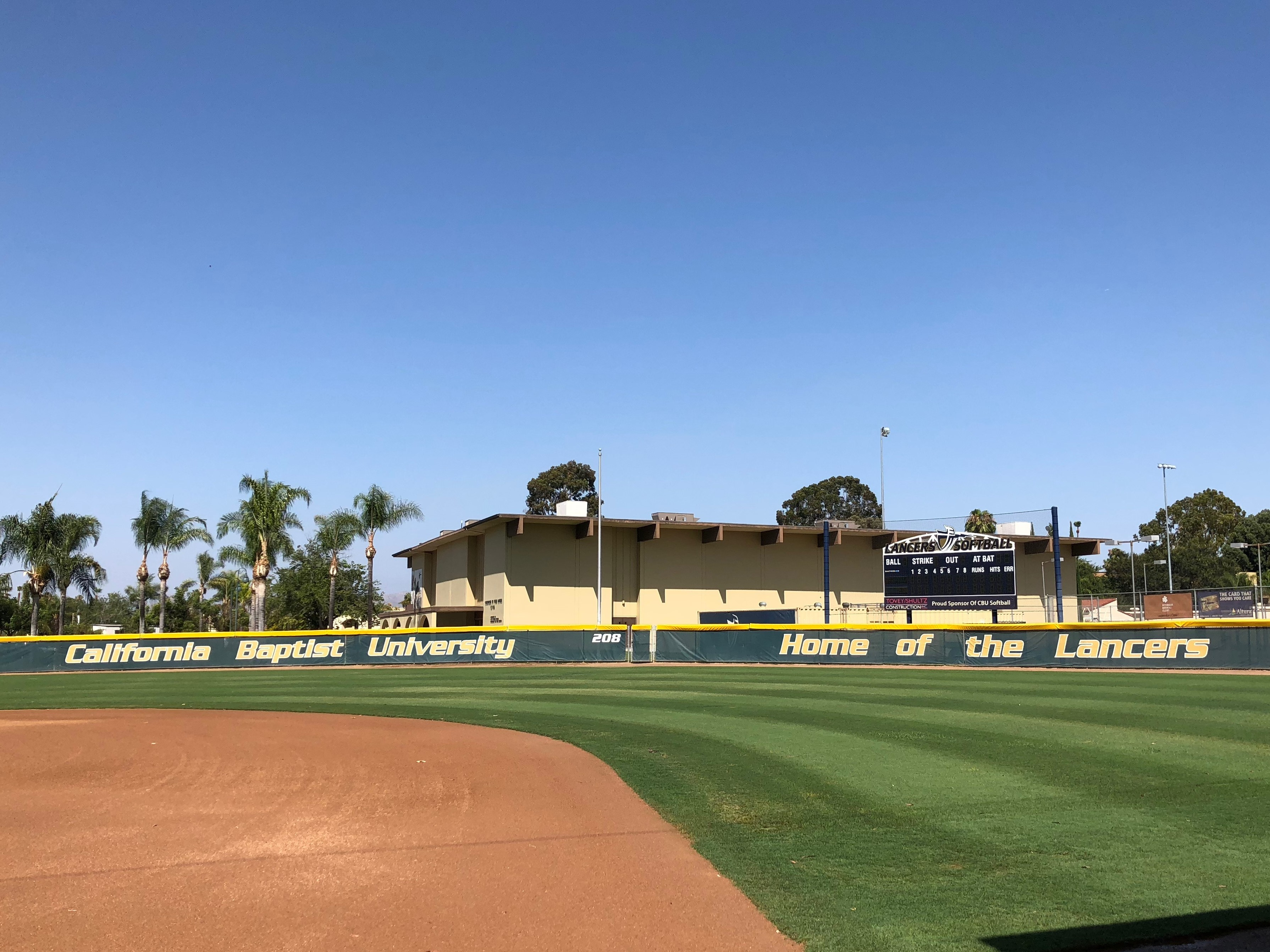
John C. Funk Stadium

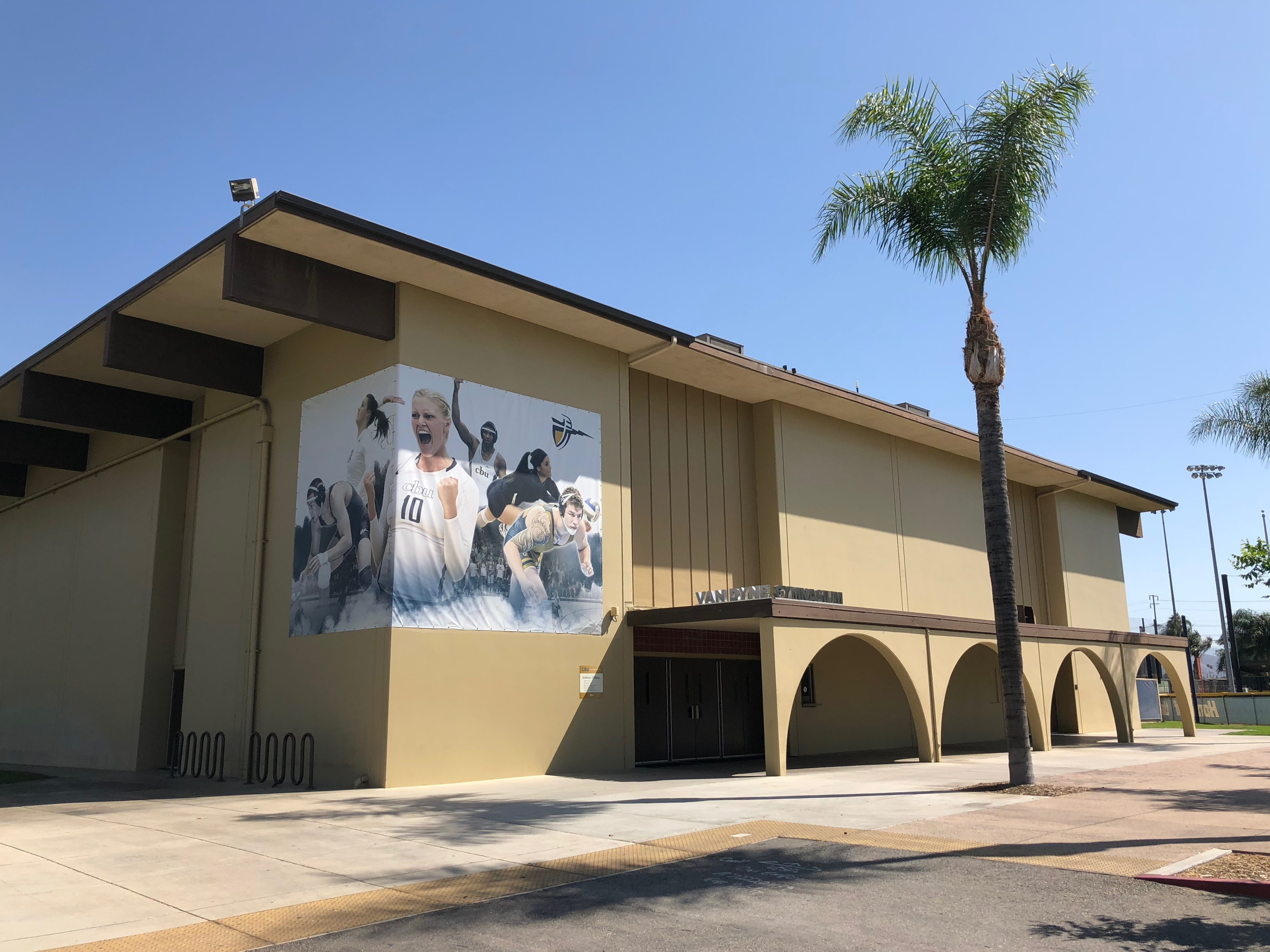
Van Dyne Gym

CBU's 162-acre main campus is in Riverside's Magnolia Avenue district. The rankings website Niche listed CBU as number three on its 2026 Best College Campuses in America ranking.

=== Campus ===
CBU is known for its Mission Revival style architecture, a hallmark of the campus that reflects the regional architectural tradition popularized in the 1920s and 1930s. CBU's original campus buildings were constructed for the Neighbors of Woodcraft fraternal organization between 1922 and 1938, and are listed as contributors to the California Baptist University Historic District by the City of Riverside.

The Annie Gabriel Library, originally built as a hospital in 1922, is the oldest structure on campus. The W.E. James Building, designed by architect Henry L. Jekel and constructed in 1925–26, originally served as a retirement home.

As the university has expanded, new construction has continued the Mission Revival style. The JoAnn Hawkins Music Building, home to the Shelby and Ferne Collinsworth School of Performing Arts, was completed in 2005. The Dr. Robert K. Jabs School of Business building was dedicated in 2012 and renamed the Hae and Shina Park Building in 2023. The Recreation Center was dedicated in January 2013 and offers 80,000 square feet of fitness and recreation space. The adjoining Athletic Performance Center, which opened in 2019, features a 10,800-square-foot weight room — the largest for an NCAA Division I non-football institution in California.

The 153,000-square-foot Dale E. and Sarah Ann Fowler Events Center, a $73 million project seating 5,050, was dedicated in 2017 and named in honor of its benefactors in 2023. The center is home to CBU's men's and women's basketball teams and hosts events open to the public, including "A CBU Christmas," an annual holiday musical and theater production.

The Dennis and Carol Troesh Engineering Building, a 100,000-square-foot academic facility, opened in 2018.

== Academics ==
=== Schools ===
Academics at the university are organized into the following colleges and schools:

- College of Architecture, Visual Art and Design
- College of Arts and Sciences
- College of Behavioral and Social Sciences
- College of Health Science
- College of Nursing
- Gordon and Jill Bourns College of Engineering
- Dr. Bonnie G. Metcalf School of Education
- Dr. Robert K. Jabs School of Business
- School of Christian Ministries
- Shelby and Ferne Collinsworth School of Performing Arts

=== Incorporation, accreditations, and memberships ===
CBU is institutionally accredited by the WASC Senior College and University Commission (WSCUC), having first received accreditation in 1961. In 2011, WSCUC awarded CBU a 10-year accreditation reaffirmation, the maximum period granted by the commission and the first time in the institution's history it had received the maximum extension. CBU received a second consecutive 10-year reaffirmation in 2025, with the next review expected in 2035. In addition, more than 20 individual academic programs hold accreditations from discipline-specific organizations.

The university is a member of the Council for Christian Colleges and Universities, the Association of Independent California Colleges and Universities, the International Association of Baptist Colleges and Universities, and the Servicemembers Opportunity Colleges. CBU is affiliated with the Lake Erie College of Osteopathic Medicine (LECOM) through an Early Acceptance Program that offers qualified students provisional acceptance to LECOM's medical, dental, and pharmacy programs.

== Student life ==
=== Campus housing ===
CBU provides on-campus housing for more than 3,500 undergraduate students across 10 living areas, including Smith and Simmons Halls, Tower Hall, The Cottages, The Village, Magnolia Crossing, College Park, The Point, Lancer Arms, Colony, and University Place.

=== Campus traditions ===
CBU's Community Life office coordinates annual campus traditions including Lancer Madness, which kicks off basketball season; the Fortuna Bowl intramural flag football championship; TWIRP (The Woman Is Required to Pay) week; and the Yule festival, a holiday celebration dating back to 1955.

== Athletics ==
The California Baptist University athletic teams are called the Lancers. The university is a member of the Division I level of the National Collegiate Athletic Association (NCAA), primarily competing in the Western Athletic Conference (WAC) for most of its sports since the 2018–19 academic year; while the men's water polo team competes in the Western Water Polo Association (WWPA); and the women's water polo team competes in the Golden Coast Conference (GCC). The Lancers previously competed in the Pacific West Conference (PacWest) of the NCAA Division II ranks from 2011–12 to 2017–18; and in the Golden State Athletic Conference (GSAC) of the National Association of Intercollegiate Athletics (NAIA) from 1987–88 to 2010–11.

CBU concluded its primary membership with the Western Athletic Conference on June 30, 2026. It began its new era of athletics with the Big West Conference on July 1, 2026.

=== Division I era ===
The Lancers began a four-year transition to NCAA Division I and the Western Athletic Conference (WAC) in 2018–19, becoming eligible for postseason play in the 2022–23 season. In March 2024, the women's basketball team won the WAC Tournament championship and earned the program's first NCAA Tournament berth. In March 2026, the men's basketball team won the WAC Tournament championship to earn their first NCAA Tournament appearance. CBU currently competes in 18 intercollegiate varsity sports. The university joined the Big West Conference on July 1, 2026.

=== Pre-division I era ===
The Lancers previously competed in the Pacific West Conference (PacWest) of the NCAA Division II ranks from 2011–12 to 2017–18; and in the Golden State Athletic Conference (GSAC) of the National Association of Intercollegiate Athletics (NAIA) from 1987–88 to 2010–11.

=== National championships ===
NCCAA
Sport	Year(s)
Baseball	2012, 2013
Men's Golf	2012
Women's Golf	2011
Men's Soccer	2011, 2012
Women's Soccer	2011, 2012
Softball	2012
Women's Volleyball	2011

NAIA
Sport	Year(s)
Softball	2009
Men's Swimming	2006, 2007, 2008, 2009
Women's Swimming	2005, 2006, 2007, 2008, 2011
Men's Track and Field	1999
Men's Volleyball	1999, 2001, 2004, 2005, 2006, 2007, 2010, 2011
Women's Volleyball	2004, 2005

Other
Sport	Year(s)
Wrestling (NCWA)	2011, 2013
Cheerleading (NCA)	2013, 2014, 2015, 2016, 2017, 2018, 2019, 2022, 2024
Dance (NDA)	2022
STUNT	2021, 2022, 2023, 2024

== Notable alumni and faculty ==
- Rick Warren (1976) – author and pastor
- Savali Talavou Ale (1977) – politician
- Nathan Fletcher (1997) – politician
- Dustin-Leigh Konzelman (2005) – beauty pageant contestant
- Fraser Kershaw (2006) – activist
- Brent Kutzle (2007) – musician
- Anthony Evans – musician
- Tom Brooks – musician
- Travis Cottrell – writer, musician, and arranger
- Jay Obernolte (2020) – politician
- Evan Honer (2022) – musician
- Corey Jackson (2022) – politician
