= 2017 NCAA Women's Water Polo Championship =

Tournament details
- Dates: May 6, 12-14
- Teams: 10

Final positions
- Champions: Stanford Cardinal
- Runners-up: UCLA Bruins

Tournament statistics
- Matches played: 9

The 2017 NCAA National Collegiate Women's Water Polo Championship was the 17th annual tournament to decide the championship of NCAA women's collegiate water polo. Two play-in games were held on May 6, with the winners advancing to the main tournament, May 12-14 at Indiana University Natatorium in Indianapolis, Indiana, hosted by IUPUI. Stanford defeated UCLA 8-7 to win its third national championship in four years.

== Qualification ==
The tournament is open to all programs from Divisions I, II, and III. Ten teams will participate in the tournament, with the champions of the Big West Conference, Collegiate Water Polo Association, Golden Coast Conference, Metro Atlantic Athletic Conference, Mountain Pacific Sports Federation, Southern California Intercollegiate Athletic Conference, and Western Water Polo Association earning automatic bids. Three teams were selected at large.

=== Opening round ===
- May 6, 2017

San Diego, CA
8	UC San Diego	5
9	Wagner	6

Stockton, CA
7	Pacific	11
10	Pomona-Pitzer	5

== Tournament bracket ==
- May 12-14 at Indiana University Natatorium, Indianapolis, Indiana

First Round
1	UCLA	17
9	Wagner	2
4	UC Irvine	7
5	California	9
2	Stanford	13
7	Pacific	6
3	USC	12
6	Michigan	6

Semifinals
1	UCLA	14
5	California	11
2	Stanford	11
3	USC	10

Championship
1	UCLA	7
2	Stanford	8

== All Tournament Team ==
TBA
