= Canham Natatorium =

College swimming venue

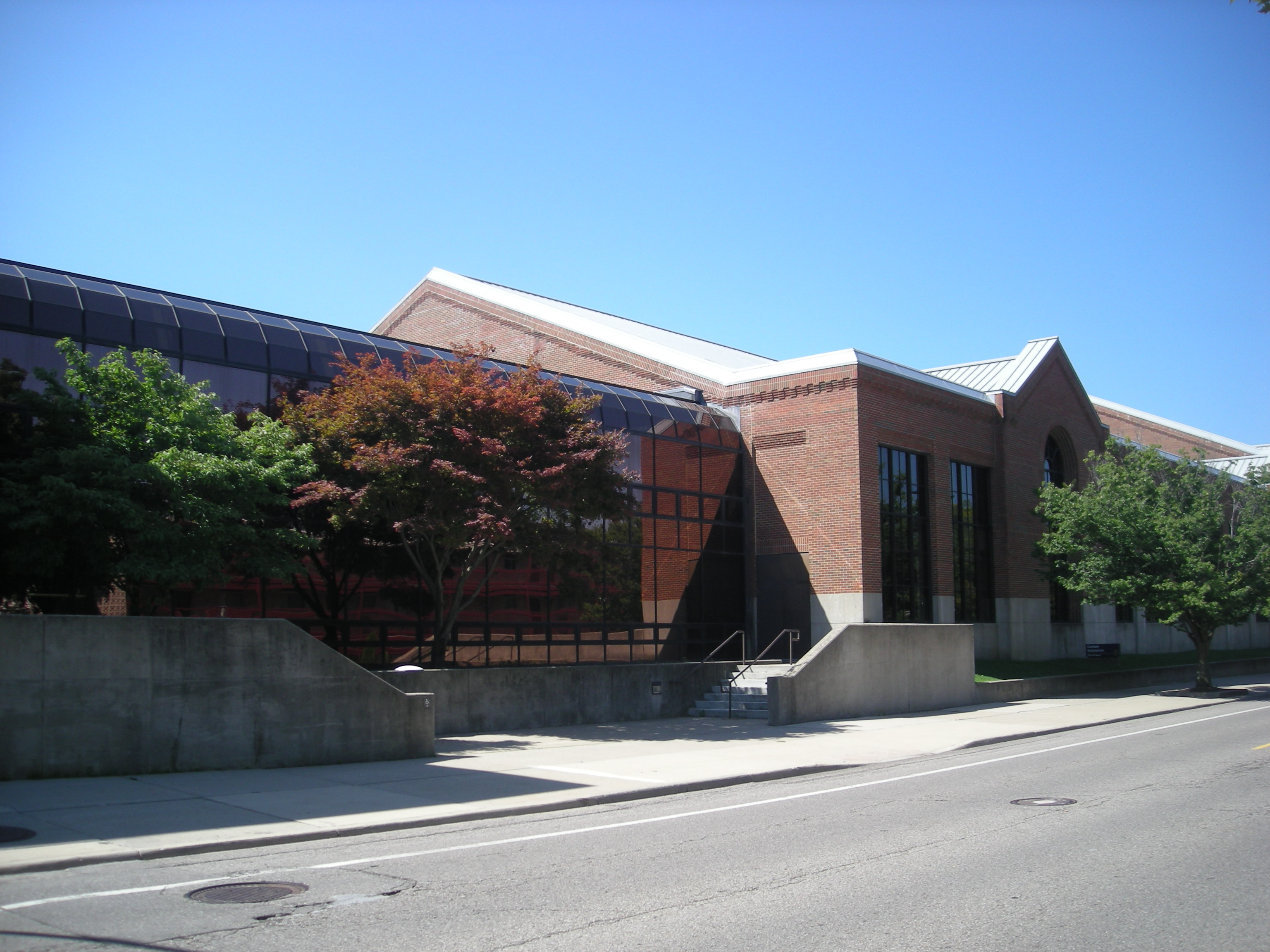
- Interactive map of Canham Natatorium
- Full name: Donald B. Canham Natatorium
- Location: 500 E. Hoover St. Ann Arbor, MI 48109
- Coordinates: 42°16′4″N 83°44′27.7″W
- Owner: University of Michigan
- Operator: University of Michigan
- Capacity: 1,200

Construction
- Built: 1988
- Opened: 1988
- Renovated: 1998
- Cost: $8.5 million

Tenants
- Michigan Wolverines swimming and diving (NCAA) (1988–present); Michigan Wolverines women's water polo (NCAA) (2001–present)

The Canham Natatorium is a swimming facility on the University of Michigan campus in Ann Arbor, Michigan. The facility is used by the Michigan Wolverines swimming and diving and women's water polo teams.

== History ==
The Natatorium was completed in 1988 and is dedicated to former Michigan athletic director Don Canham, who retired in June 1988. The complex is 59,000 square feet and features a 50-meter pool, eight lanes wide, while the diving well features an Olympic Tower with a 10-meter diving platform, one and three-meter springboards, and a hot tub. In 2002, Michigan dedicated the diving pool in Canham Natatorium to diving coach Dick Kimball, who retired after the season following 43 years of service for the university. Kimball coached nine Olympic medalists, five NCAA Champions, and a record 33 Big Ten Conference championship teams.

In 1998, the Natatorium underwent renovations, including a new roofing system, ventilation system, and new filtration equipment for both swimming and diving pools. A state-of-the-art lighting system for the competition pool was also installed, allowing lighting levels to be adjusted based upon the level of activity in competition. In 2014, an elevated diving mezzanine and space for an endless pool training system below it were installed. The mezzanine features a pair of springboards and thick foam pads for the divers to land on for dry-land training.

== Notable events ==
The pool has hosted several high-level national meets since 1988, including the 1992 Phillips 66 National Diving Championship, the 1993 U.S. Open Swimming Championships, and the 1994 U.S. Speedo Junior National Championship. It has also hosted the 1996 NCAA Division I Women's Swimming and Diving Championships and the 2005 and 2022 NCAA Women's Water Polo Championships.

They have also hosted the Big Ten Conference Women's Swimming and Diving Championship five times (1989, 1993, 2002, 2009, 2016) and the Big Ten Conference Men's Swimming and Diving Championship six times (1990, 1996, 2000, 2003, 2008, 2014).
