= Concordia Golden Eagles =

Athletic teams representing Concordia University Irvine

- University: Concordia University Irvine
- Conference: PacWest (primary); GCC (women's water polo); MPSF (men's volleyball); PCSC (men's swimming and diving); RMAC (men's lacrosse); WWLL (women's lacrosse); WWPA (men's water polo)
- NCAA: Division II
- Athletic director: Crystal Rosenthal
- Location: Irvine, California
- Varsity teams: 22 (10 men's, 12 women's)
- Basketball arena: CU Arena
- Baseball stadium: Golden Eagles Field
- Soccer field: Golden Eagles Field
- Nickname: Golden Eagles
- Colors: Green and gold
- Website: cuigoldeneagles.com

The Concordia Golden Eagles, formerly known as the Concordia Eagles, are the athletic teams that represent Concordia University Irvine, located in Irvine, California, in intercollegiate sports as a member of the Division II level of the National Collegiate Athletic Association (NCAA). The Golden Eagles primarily competed in the Pacific West Conference (PacWest) for most of their sports since the 2015–16 academic year; while its men's volleyball team competes in the Mountain Pacific Sports Federation (MPSF); and its men's water polo team competes in the Western Water Polo Association (WWPA). CUI previously competed in the Golden State Athletic Conference (GSAC) of the National Association of Intercollegiate Athletics (NAIA) from 1987–88 to 2014–15; and as an NAIA Independent from 1981–82 to 1986–87. The CUI women's water polo team competed in the Golden Coast Conference (GCC) until the 2022 spring season.

== History ==
The Golden Eagles have won championships in sixteen separate sports, including national championships in women's cross country (2000), volleyball (2012 for women and 2013 for men), men's basketball (2003, 2012), baseball (2011), and softball (2013).

The Golden Eagles competed in the NAIA from 1981 to 2015 (mostly primarily in the GSAC) before transitioning to NCAA Division II.

CUI's athletic teams were previously known as the Eagles, and adopted the Golden Eagles nickname prior to the 2022–23 academic year.

== Varsity sports ==
CUI competes in 21 intercollegiate varsity sports: Men's sports include baseball, basketball, cross country, lacrosse, soccer, swimming & diving, tennis, track & field, volleyball and water polo; while women's sports include softball, basketball, beach volleyball, cheerleading, cross country, soccer, softball, stunt, swimming & diving, tennis, track & field and volleyball. Former sports included women's lacrosse and women's water polo.

== Club sports ==
CUI also utilizes club teams for lacrosse for both men and women.

== National championships ==
=== Team ===
| Sport | Association | Division | Year | Opponent/Runner-up | Score/Points |
|---|---|---|---|---|---|
| Men's basketball (2) | NAIA | Division I | 2003 | Mountain State | 88–84 (OT) |
| Men's basketball (2) | NAIA | Division I | 2012 | Oklahoma Baptist | 72–69 |
| Baseball (1) | NAIA | Single | 2011 | Lubbock Christian | 9–3 |
| Women's cross country (1) | NAIA | Single | 2001 | Concordia Nebraska | 133–188 |
| Softball (1) | NAIA | Single | 2013 | Spring Hill | 8–3 |
