= Kelly Heuchan =

Australian water polo player

Personal information
- Nationality: Australia
- Born: 30 January 1980 (age 46) Perth, Western Australia
- Height: 1.78 m (5 ft 10 in)
- Weight: 67 kg (148 lb)

Sport
- Sport: Water polo
- Position: driver

Senior clubs
- Years: Team
- ?-?: Fremantle Marlins
National team
- Years: Team
- ?-?: Australia

Kelly Heuchan (born 30 January 1980) is an Australian former female water polo player.

She was a member of the Australia women's national water polo team, playing as a driver, and participated at the 2004 Summer Olympics. On the club level she played for Fremantle Marlins in Australia.

== Personal life ==
She has three children with her ex-husband Steve Parks, an American rower.
