= Jacqueline Frank DeLuca =

American water polo player (born 1980)

Personal information
- Born: May 1, 1980 (age 46) Hermosa Beach, California, United States

Sport
- Sport: Water polo
Medal record
Representing the United States
Olympic Games
Bronze medal – third place	2004 Athens	Team competition
World Championships
Gold medal – first place	2003 Barcelona	Team competition

Jacqueline "Jackie" Frank DeLuca Cochran (born May 1, 1980) is an American water polo goalkeeper, 2004 bronze medal Olympian and two-time collegiate National Player of the Year.

== Early life ==
Jackie Frank began competitive swimming at the Long Beach Swim Club at age 10. After a year of swimming, she joined the water polo team. In the last game of the year, she played in goal when the regular goalie did not show up and ended up making first-team all-tournament.

Frank is 1998 graduate of Los Alamitos High School, where she competed on both the swim and water polo teams and was named First-Team All-America in water polo each of her four years. Her Los Al Griffins water polo team won the Southern Section Championship in 1996 and her swimming team won the Southern Section Championship in 1994. In her junior year, her girls water-polo team finished 24–0. Besides athletics, Frank was active in the Key Club and was selected for the California Scholarship Federation.

== Stanford University ==
As a freshman in 1999, Jackie Frank redshirted to train with the U.S. National Team. The next year, however, she decided to return to Stanford and did not play with the US Olympic team at the 2000 Sydney Olympics. As a first year goalie, Frank played in 27 games for 686 minutes and recorded a GAA of 4.65. She played well against good opponents: 15 saves to keep Cal scoreless in the first three periods of play in the Northern California Regional Qualifiers, 7 saves to help Stanford to an 8–5 win over the California Golden Bears in the National Championship third-place game.

As a sophomore in 2001, Frank was named First Team All-America by the American Water Polo Coaches Association and All-Tournament Team honors at the NCAA and the MPSF Championships. She recorded 151 saves in 25 games with a 6.0 saves per game average and held opponents to just 79 goals. The Stanford Athletic Board awarded Jackie Frank the Block 'S' for the athlete with the highest cumulative grade point average.

In 2002: Stanford women's water polo had a 23–2 season and avenged their 2001 loss in the NCAA Women's Water Polo Championship by beating UCLA 8–4. Frank was voted the MVP of the tournament; in the final game she had 12 saves and allowed only 1 goal when UCLA had 6 on 5 advantage. The American Water Polo Coaches Association named her Player of the Year for a second year in a row. Frank had 161 saves in goal for the Stanford Cardinal, averaging 7.32 per game and allowed only 87 opponent goals. She was also selected as an Academic All-American and Stanford Athletic Board Block 'S' outstanding athlete for a second year.

The Stanford women made their third consecutive appearance in the NCAA title game in May 2003. Frank's statistics by then: 23 games, 142 saves, including a thrilling overtime game against UCLA at the MPSF Tournament with 22 saves. The senior goalkeeper was honored as the NCAA Player of the Year and Mountain Pacific Sports Federation Goalie of the Year for the second straight season. In June 2003, Jackie Frank receiving the Stanford Athletic Board's highest honor, The Al Masters Award, for attaining the highest standards of athletic performance, leadership and academic achievement. The same month, Frank was named recipient of the Peter J. Cutino Award, which annually recognizes the best male and female American collegiate water polo player.

== Olympics and international play ==
Jacqueline Frank Deluca Cochran played on the U.S. Senior National Team from 1998 to 2004, and since summer of 2002 as starting goalkeeper. In five games at the 2002 World Cup in Perth, Australia, Frank amassed 52 saves, including a tournament-high 14 in a semifinal game against Canada and 8 in the silver medal performance against Hungary. Her 4.2 goals per game was the lowest among all goalies at the World Cup.

In June 2004, Jackie Frank came up with two stops during the deciding penalty shootout of an eventual 12–10 win over Hungary in the gold medal game of the FINA Women's Water Polo World League Super Final. In Long Beach, California before a crowd of 3,108, Team USA and Hungary never got more than one goal ahead of each other through 36 minutes of play. Still tied 8–8 at the end of regulation, the gold-medal decision came down to a penalty shootout.

The 2004 U.S. women's Olympic water polo team, with Jackie Frank as goalie, just missed out on the gold medal game when Italy defeated the US on a last minute shot that got past Frank for a goal. The team defeated Australia for the bronze medal. She was the top goalkeeper at the 2004 Olympics, with 41 saves.

After taking a year off to have a baby, Stanford alumna and 2004 Olympic Team goalkeeper Jackie Cochran, formerly Frank, rejoined the USA Water Polo Women's National Team in October 2005. A month later. her first competition was the Speedo Top 40 tournament at the USA Water Polo National Training Center in Los Alamitos, where she had won MVP honors in 2002.

Jackie completed dermatology residency at Wake Forest Baptist health and is now a dermatologist at Kaiser Permanente in southern California. She has 5 children and is married to Pat Cochran. She is now a coach at Shore aquatics along with her husband, coaching the girl's 14u team.

== See also ==
- United States women's Olympic water polo team records and statistics
- List of Olympic medalists in water polo (women)
- List of women's Olympic water polo tournament goalkeepers
- List of world champions in women's water polo
- List of World Aquatics Championships medalists in water polo
