= Biola Eagles =

- University: Biola University
- Nickname: Eagles
- Association: Division II
- Conference: PacWest (primary); PCSC (swimming); WWPA (water polo)
- Athletic director: Dr. Bethany Miller
- Location: La Mirada, California
- Varsity teams: 17 (8 men's, 9 women's)
- Basketball arena: Chase Gymnasium
- Baseball stadium: Eagles Diamond
- Softball stadium: Freedom Field
- Soccer stadium: Al Barbour Field
- Colors: Red, blue, and white
- Website: athletics.biola.edu

The Biola Eagles are the athletic teams that represent Biola University, located in La Mirada, California, in intercollegiate sports as a member of the Division II level of the National Collegiate Athletic Association (NCAA), primarily competing in the Pacific West Conference (PacWest) since the 2017–18 academic year; while its men's and women's swimming & diving teams compete in the Pacific Collegiate Swim and Dive Conference (PCSC). The men and women's water polo teams compete in the Western Water Polo Association (WWPA). They were also a member of the National Christian College Athletic Association (NCCAA), primarily competing as an independent in the West Region of the Division I level. The Eagles previously competed in the Golden State Athletic Conference (GSAC) of the National Association of Intercollegiate Athletics (NAIA) from 1994 to 1995 to 2016–17.

== History ==
Biola University Athletics was an active member of the NAIA from 1964 to 2017. The Eagles were accepted for provisional NCAA membership on July 20, 2016, and played their initial PacWest Conference season in 2017–18. BU was accepted for full NCAA Division II membership on July 12, 2019. Biola University was established as the Bible Institute of Los Angeles in 1908.

=== Brand identity ===
On August 7, 2026, Biola Athletics introduced a refreshed brand identity, replacing branding in use since 2012. Developed over more than a year with the branding studio Daake and its affiliate, The Athletic Branding Company, it includes a redesigned "Biola" script logo, a new Eagle mascot mark, a custom typeface inspired by the "Jesus Saves" signs above Biola's original downtown Los Angeles campus, and Biola Blue as a secondary color alongside red and white. New uniforms, a redesigned Chase Gymnasium court and updated facility signage are being rolled out through the 2026–27 academic year.

== Varsity teams ==
Biola competes in 17 intercollegiate varsity sports: Men's sports include baseball, basketball, cross country, soccer, swimming, tennis, track & field, and water polo; while women's sports include basketball, cross country, soccer, softball, swimming, tennis, track & field, volleyball, and water polo. Former sports included men's golf and women's golf. In September 2026, Biola announced that it would add women's flag football as its 18th varsity sport and 10th women's program, with the founding class arriving in fall 2027 and the inaugural season in spring 2028. The team will begin play as an NCAA Division II independent; Biola is the second PacWest member, after Hawaii Pacific, to add the sport.

=== Men's basketball ===
Dave Holmquist is the school's men's basketball coach. He coached for 40 seasons in the National Association of Intercollegiate Athletics and is the winningest active coach in the NAIA Division I rankings (947–364). He now has over 1,050 career coaching victories.

=== Men's water polo ===
In 2023, Biola, a Division II member of the Western Water Polo Association (WWPA), won the WWPA tournament championship, defeating Concordia 18–12 to earn the program's first berth in the NCAA men's water polo championship. The Eagles lost 20–7 to top-seeded UCLA in the quarterfinals. Nolan Rapp was named the Association of Collegiate Water Polo Coaches (ACWPC) Division II Player of the Year and head coach Rick Nordell the ACWPC Division II Coach of the Year for the 2023 season.

=== Swimming and diving ===
Biola's swimming and diving program competed in the NAIA before joining NCAA Division II in 2017. During the 2010s the women's team produced a run of NAIA national champions led by sisters Christine Tixier and Lisa Tixier; Christine won eight individual national titles and was NAIA Women's Swimmer of the Year in 2014 and 2015, and Lisa was NAIA Women's Swimmer of the Year in 2017. April Smith became the program's first national champion in 2010, Christina Ali won a national title in 2016, and the women's team placed third at the 2017 NAIA Championships, its best national finish.

=== Women's soccer ===
Biola has sponsored women's soccer since 1992, competing in the NAIA and the Golden State Athletic Conference before joining NCAA Division II in 2017. In 2017, the Eagles went 17–3–2 and won the National Christian College Athletic Association (NCCAA) national championship, defeating Indiana Wesleyan 4–0 in the final; Madyson Brown was named NCCAA Player of the Year and head coach Erin Brunelle the NCCAA Coach of the Year.

=== Men's soccer ===
Biola has fielded men's soccer since the 1960s, competing in the NAIA and the Golden State Athletic Conference before moving to NCAA Division II and the Pacific West Conference in 2017. In 2022, the Eagles earned a share of the PacWest regular-season title, the program's first conference championship at the NCAA Division II level, and forward Kristian Colaci was named PacWest Player of the Year.

=== Volleyball ===
Biola's women's volleyball program competed in the NAIA before joining NCAA Division II and the Pacific West Conference in 2017. The Eagles won back-to-back National Christian College Athletic Association (NCCAA) Division I national championships in 2017 and 2018, and were NAIA national runners-up in 1985, 1997, and 2013.

=== Cross country ===
Biola's men's and women's cross country teams competed in the NAIA and the National Christian College Athletic Association (NCCAA) before joining NCAA Division II in 2017. The men's team won NCCAA national championships in 2017 and 2018, and the women's team won the NCCAA title in 2018.

=== Track and field ===
Biola's track and field program has produced national champions and All-Americans in the NAIA and NCAA Division II. Musa Dogon Yaro won the 1971 NAIA 800-meter national title and competed for Nigeria at the 1968 and 1972 Olympic Games. At the 2026 NCAA Division II Outdoor Championships, Joshua Widdows won the 400-meter hurdles silver medal and Eboselulu Omofoma the triple jump bronze.

=== Softball ===
Biola's softball program competed in the NAIA before joining NCAA Division II in 2018. In 2021, its first year of NCAA Division II postseason eligibility, the Eagles finished as the NCAA Division II national runners-up, losing the championship series to West Texas A&M.

== National championships and honors ==
- Volleyball: NCCAA Division I national champions in 2017 and 2018.
- Men's cross country: NCCAA national champions in 2017 and 2018.
- Men's basketball: NCCAA Division I national champions in 1976 and 1978, and NAIA Division I national runner-up in 1982.
- Softball: NCAA Division II national runner-up in 2021, losing the championship series to West Texas A&M.

== Athletic director ==
Dr. Bethany Miller currently serves as the athletic director, overseeing all 17 varsity programs.
