= Robin Beauregard =

American water polo player (born 1979)

Personal information
- Full name: Robin Mary Beauregard
- Born: February 23, 1979 (age 47) Long Beach, California, U.S.
- Occupation: Phyical Therapist

Sport
- Sport: Water Polo
- Position: Center (2-meter position)
- College team: University of California Los Angeles
- Coached by: Adam Krikorian (UCLA); Guy Baker (Olympics)
Medal record
Women's water polo
Representing United States
Olympic Games
Silver medal – second place	2000 Sydney	Team competition
Bronze medal – third place	2004 Athens	Team competition
World Championships
Gold medal – first place	2003 Barcelona	Team competition
Pan American Games
Silver medal – second place	1999 Winnipeg	Team competition

Robin Mary Beauregard (born February 23, 1979) is an American water polo player, who won the silver medal at the 2000 Summer Olympics, and a bronze medal at the 2004 Summer Olympics. Beauregard plays the position of center defender.

Beauregard was born February 23, 1979 in Long Beach California. She attended Marina High School, which did not have a female water polo team until her junior year. Prior to playing on the girls team, she played on the boy's team which won the Southern California High School Water Polo Championships in November 1995.

== Olympics ==
=== 2000 Sydney silver medal ===
Beauregard played with the U.S. women's team at the 2000 Summer Olympics in Sydney, Australia, that won the silver medal in the 2000 Olympic water polo team competition. A strong scorer and important team contributor, Beauregard was credited with six goals in 2000 Olympic competition, which included three in an early game against Canada. For the 2000 Olympics, she was trained and mentored by Hall of Fame Olympic Head Coach Guy Baker. The Australian team took the gold medal, and the Russian Federation team took the bronze.

=== 2004 Athens bronze medal ===
Four years later, Beauregard was part of the U.S. women's team at the 2004 Summer Olympics in Athens, Greece that won the bronze medal in the 2004 Olympic women's team competition, where she was again managed by Olympic coach Guy Baker. At the 2004 Olympic semi-final, the Greek team beat Australia 6-2 to move on to the finals. Italy trailed the United States for most of the other semi-final game, but eventually won 6-5 leaving the U.S. team with the bronze medal. Italy had defeated Greece, 7-2, in group play, but the final game for the gold and silver medal was quite close, and was tied 7-7 at the end of regular play. Greece took a 9-7 lead in overtime, but Italy tied the game, and then won the game by a score of 10-9 in a second overtime, capturing the gold medal, with Greece receiving the silver.

=== University of California Los Angeles ===
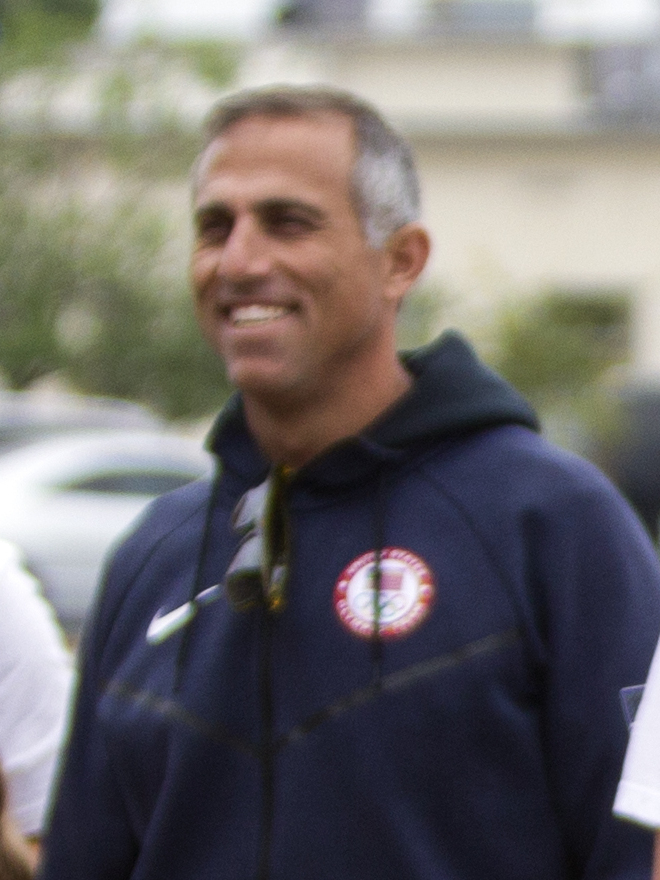
Krikorian in 2018

Beauregard attended and played water polo for the University of California Los Angeles (UCLA) under Head Coach Adam Krikorian. She was named the Most Outstanding Player at the 2003 NCAA Championships, where UCLA beat Stanford University winning the national championship by a score of 4–3. She was with two other UCLA teams women's water polo teams that won the NCAA National championship as a Freshman on the team that won the 2001 National Championships, and as a Senior on the team that won the 2003 National championships. Beauregard was a First Team NCAA All-American three times while at UCLA. She was twice a candidate for the distinctive Peter J. Cutino Award which honors the male and female collegiate water polo players of the year.

In international competition, she was part of the U.S. National team that won a gold medal at the 2003 World Championships in Barcelona, Spain and a silver medal at the 1999 Pan American games in Winnipeg, Canada.

=== Honors ===
In 2011, she was inducted into the USA Water Polo Hall of Fame, and in 2017 became a member of the UCLA Hall of Fame.

In professional pursuits, she holds a PHd. in Physical Therapy, and has worked with ProSport Physical Therapy in California's Rancho Santa Margarita.

== International competition ==
- Olympic Games: Silver Medal (2000), Bronze Medal (2004)
- World Championships: Gold Medal (2003)
- Pan American Games: Second Place (1999)
- FINA World Cup: Second Place (2002)
- FINA World Championships: Fourth Place (2001)

== See also ==
- United States women's Olympic water polo team records and statistics
- List of Olympic medalists in water polo (women)
- List of world champions in women's water polo
- List of World Aquatics Championships medalists in water polo
