= Golden Coast Conference =

- Association: NCAA
- Founded: 2013
- Commissioner: Mike Daniels (since October 2013)
- Sports fielded: 1; men's: 0; women's: 1
- Division: National Collegiate
- No. of teams: 7 (8 in 2026, 5 in 2027)
- Region: West Coast
- Website: www.gccwaterpolo.com

The Golden Coast Conference (GCC) is a collegiate athletic conference in the United States in which its members compete in the National Collegiate Athletic Association National Collegiate (D-NC) division. The conference sponsors one sport, water polo, and was founded in 2013 fielding women's teams. A men's division was added for fall 2016, but was discontinued after the 2022 season.

== History ==
=== Founding ===
Founded in 2013, the Golden Coast Conference originally started as a women's only conference in NCAA water polo. Mike Daniels, the commissioner of the Golden State Athletic Conference, was named as the league's first commissioner in October 2013 and held both roles simultaneously. The National Collegiate Athletic Association awarded Division I status to the conference effective August 1, 2013.

GCC founding members were Azusa Pacific University, California Baptist University, Fresno Pacific University, Loyola Marymount University, San Diego State University, Santa Clara University and University of the Pacific. The first season of play was in Spring 2014, although the league did not qualify for an automatic bid to the NCAA Women's Water Polo Championship.

The Spring 2016 season marked the first time the conference had an automatic bid to the NCAA Women's Water Polo Championship with the inaugural honors going to San Diego State.

=== Introduction of men's division ===
Fall 2016 saw the introduction of a men's competition as the non-Pac-12 Conference members playing water polo within the Mountain Pacific Sports Federation totaled six, the required number for a new conference. California State University, Long Beach, Pepperdine University, San Jose State University, University of California, Irvine, University of California, Santa Barbara, and University of the Pacific broke away from the MPSF to create the men's division of the Golden Coast Conference. The splintering caused the MPSF's membership to drop to 4 teams. The effects of the split were felt across the country and resulted in a major realignment of the Collegiate Water Polo Association.

With the West Coast Conference and Big West Conference both sponsoring men's water polo in 2023, all six men's members of the conference left after the 2022 season, causing the Golden Coast Conference to stop sponsoring men's water polo.

== Members ==
Members departing for the Big West Conference in 2027.

Institution	Location	Nickname	Joined	Primary Conference	Division
University of California, Davis	Davis, California	Aggies	2026	Mountain West	NCAA D-I
California State University, Fresno	Fresno, California	Bulldogs	2017	Mountain West	NCAA D-I
Loyola Marymount University	Los Angeles, California	Lions	2014	West Coast	NCAA D-I
University of the Pacific	Stockton, California	Tigers	2014	West Coast	NCAA D-I
San Diego State University	San Diego, California	Aztecs	2014	Mountain West	NCAA D-I
Santa Clara University	Santa Clara, California	Broncos	2014	West Coast	NCAA D-I
Saint Mary's College of California	Moraga, California	Gaels	2026	West Coast	NCAA D-I
San Jose State University	San Jose, California	Spartans	2026	Mountain West	NCAA D-I

=== Former members ===
Institution	Location	Nickname	Joined	Left	Primary Conference	Division	(M)	(W)
Azusa Pacific University	Azusa, California	Cougars	2014	2026	SCIAC	NCAA D-III		✓
California Baptist University	Riverside, California	Lancers	2014	2026	Big West	NCAA D-I		✓
University of California, Irvine	Irvine, California	Anteaters	2016	2023	Big West	NCAA D-I	✓	
California State University, Long Beach	Long Beach, California	Beach	2016	2023	Big West	NCAA D-I	✓	
University of California, Santa Barbara	Isla Vista, California	Gauchos	2016	2023	Big West	NCAA D-I	✓	
Concordia University–Irvine	Irvine, California	Eagles	2015	2025	Pacific West	NCAA D-II		✓
Fresno Pacific University	Fresno, California	Sunbirds	2014	2017	CCAA	NCAA D-II		✓
University of the Pacific	Stockton, California	Tigers	2016	2023	West Coast	NCAA D-I	✓	
Pepperdine University	Malibu, California	Waves	2016	2023	West Coast	NCAA D-I	✓	
San Jose State University	San Jose, California	Spartans	2016	2023	Mountain West	NCAA D-I	✓	
