= Collegiate Water Polo Association =

College water polo conference

The Collegiate Water Polo Association is a conference of colleges and universities in the Eastern United States that sponsors 19 men's and 17 women's teams that compete in varsity water polo. The winners of the conference tournaments earn one of the four spots in the NCAA Men's Water Polo Championship and one of the eight spots in the NCAA Women's Water Polo Championship. The CWPA sponsors club team competition in 17 men's divisions and 13 women's divisions across the United States.

== History ==
The conference was founded in the early 1970s as the Mid Atlantic Conference by Dick Russell, the swimming and water polo coach at Bucknell University with member schools from New York, Pennsylvania, New Jersey, and Maryland. The first conference championship was held in 1972, with Yale defeating Harvard.

The organization was run by the conference's coaches until a commissioner was hired in 1990. In 1993, the Mid Atlantic Conference admitted the full memberships of the New England and Southern Conferences, changing its name to the Mid Atlantic Conference with 39 varsity and club member schools. The following year, the conference went co-ed, raising the number of member teams to 55. As the organization expanded into the Midwest in 1995, the referees from the Eastern Water Polo Referees Association opted to go on strike, so the conference established its own refereeing bureau. With 95 teams from the Northeast, Midwest, and South, the conference took its present name in 1996.

The CWPA continued expanding, entering the Northwest in 1998, the Great Plains and California in 1999, and now has membership in 43 of the contiguous 48 States.

== CWPA staff ==
- Commissioner- Dan Sharadin
- Director of Communications- Ed Haas
- Membership Services- Calianne Timothy
- Director of Multimedia- TBA
- Director of Creative Services- Justin Dorazio
- Director of Officials- Ed Reed

== Varsity teams competing in the CWPA ==
=== Men's teams ===
Mid-Atlantic Water Polo Conference

- Bucknell
- Fordham
- George Washington
- Mercyhurst
- Mount St. Mary's
- Navy
- Wagner

Northeast Water Polo Conference

- Brown
- Harvard
- Iona
- LIU
- MIT
- Princeton

=== Women's teams ===
Division I

- Brown University
- Bucknell University
- George Washington University
- Harvard University
- Indiana University - Starting in 2028
- Mercyhurst University
- University of Michigan
- Princeton University

Division III

- Augustana College
- Austin College
- Carthage College
- Connecticut College
- Denison University
- Grove City College
- Macalester College
- Penn State Behrend
- Saint Francis University (PA)
- Washington & Jefferson College
- Wheaton College (MA)

== Club teams competing in the CWPA ==
=== Men's teams ===
Atlantic Division

- Georgetown
- James Madison
- Maryland
- Navy
- North Carolina
- NC State
- Virginia
- Virginia Tech
- Wake Forest

Big Ten Division

- Illinois
- Indiana
- Iowa
- Michigan
- Michigan State
- Northwestern
- Ohio State
- Purdue
- Wisconsin

Colonial Division

- Amherst
- Coast Guard
- UMass
- Middlebury
- Wesleyan
- Williams
- WPI

Florida Division

- UCF "A"
- UCF "B"
- Florida "A"
- Florida "B"
- Florida Atlantic
- Florida Gulf Coast
- Florida State
- Miami (Fla.)

Great Lakes Division

- Cincinnati
- Davenport
- Dayton
- Grand Valley State
- Miami (Ohio)
- Notre Dame
- Xavier

Heartland Division

- Augustana (IL)
- Carleton
- Grinnell
- Knox
- Macalester
- Saint John's (MN)
- St. Mary's (MN)
- St. Olaf

Mid Atlantic Division A

- Carnegie Mellon
- Drexel
- Penn
- Penn State "A"
- Penn State "B"
- Pittsburgh
- Villanova

Mid Atlantic Division B

- Albright
- Bloomsburg
- Bucknell
- Delaware
- Lehigh
- Rutgers
- Saint Joseph's
- West Chester

Missouri Valley Division

- Lindenwood "A"
- Lindenwood "B"
- McKendree
- Missouri
- Missouri S&T
- Saint Louis
- Washington University in St. Louis
- Iowa State University

New England Division

- Boston College
- Boston University
- UConn
- Dartmouth
- Northeastern
- Tufts
- Yale

New York Division Eastern Region

- Columbia
- NYU
- RPI
- Coast Guard
- Merchant Marine
- Army

New York Division Western Region

- Binghamton
- Buffalo
- Cornell "A"
- Cornell "B"
- Hamilton
- Syracuse

North Atlantic Division

- Bates
- Bowdoin
- Colby
- Vermont

Northwest Division

- Boise State
- Central Washington
- Oregon
- Oregon State
- Seattle
- Washington
- Western Washington

Pacific Coast Division

- Cal Poly "A"
- Cal Poly "B"
- UCLA "A"
- UCLA "B"
- Long Beach State
- UC Santa Barbara
- USC

Rocky Mountain Division

- Colorado "A"
- Colorado "B"
- Colorado Mesa
- Colorado School of Mines
- Colorado State
- Denver
- New Mexico
- Utah "A"
- Utah "B"
- Utah State
- Wyoming

Sierra Pacific Division

- California
- UC Davis "A"
- UC Davis "B"
- UC Merced
- UC Santa Cruz
- Cal State Chico
- California Maritime
- Cal State Monterey
- San Jose State
- Stanford

Southeast Division

- Alabama
- Auburn
- Clemson
- Georgia
- Georgia Southern
- Georgia Tech
- Kennesaw State
- Tennessee
- Vanderbilt

Southwest Division

- Arizona
- Arizona State
- UC Irvine
- UC San Diego "A"
- UC San Diego "B"
- Cal State Northridge
- San Diego
- San Diego State

Texas Division

- Baylor
- Houston
- LSU
- Rice
- Texas A&M "A"
- Texas A&M "B"
- Texas State
- Texas Tech
- Texas "A"
- Texas "B"
- SMU

==== Men's Division III Collegiate Club Champions ====
- 1999 Wesleyan University
- 2000 RIT
- 2001 Trinity University
- 2002 RIT
- 2003 Middlebury College
- 2004 Wesleyan University
- 2005 Wesleyan University
- 2006 Lindenwood University
- 2007 Lindenwood University
- 2008 Lindenwood University
- 2009 Tufts University
- 2010 UC-Santa Cruz
- 2011 Washington University in St. Louis
- 2012 Monmouth College
- 2013 UC-Santa Cruz
- 2014 UC-Santa Cruz/Washington University in St. Louis (Co-Champions)
- 2015 Washington University in St. Louis
- 2016 Washington University in St. Louis
- 2017 Washington University in St. Louis
- 2018 Washington University in St. Louis
- 2019 Washington University in St. Louis
- 2020 Cancelled due to COVID-19 pandemic
- 2021 Cancelled

==== Men's National Collegiate Club Champions ====
- 1993 Northwestern University
- 1994 United States Military Academy
- 1995 University of Dayton
- 1996 University of Michigan
- 1997 Dartmouth College
- 1998 University of Michigan
- 1999 Cal Poly State University
- 2000 Michigan State University
- 2001 Cal Poly State University
- 2002 Cal Poly State University
- 2003 University of Michigan
- 2004 Cal Poly State University
- 2005 Grand Valley State University
- 2006 Michigan State University
- 2007 Cal Poly State University
- 2008 Michigan State University
- 2009 UCLA
- 2010 UCLA
- 2011 USC
- 2012 USC
- 2013 UCLA
- 2014 Lindenwood University
- 2015 Lindenwood University
- 2016 Lindenwood University
- 2017 San Diego State University
- 2018 Lindenwood University
- 2019 Lindenwood University
- 2020 Canceled due to COVID-19 pandemic
- 2021 Michigan State University
- 2022 UC San Diego
- 2023 UC San Diego
- 2024 UC San Diego
- 2024 Cal Poly

=== Women's teams ===
Atlantic Division

- Duke
- Georgetown
- James Madison
- North Carolina
- Virginia
- Virginia Tech

Big Ten Division

- Illinois
- Iowa
- Michigan "A"
- Michigan "B"
- Michigan State
- Ohio State
- Purdue
- Wisconsin

Heartland Division

- Augustana
- Carleton
- Grinnell
- Knox
- St. Mary's (MN)
- St. Olaf

Mid Atlantic Division

- Carnegie Mellon
- Penn
- Penn State Blue
- Penn State White
- Pittsburgh
- West Chester

Midwest Division

- Cincinnati
- Grand Valley State "A"
- Grand Valley State "B"
- Illinois State
- Lindenwood
- Miami (Ohio)
- Notre Dame
- Ohio
- Saint Louis
- Washington (St. Louis)

New England Division

- Boston College
- Boston University
- Dartmouth
- UMass
- Northeastern
- Wesleyan
- Williams

New York Division

- Colgate
- Columbia
- Cornell
- Hamilton
- Hartwick
- NYU
- Syracuse

North Atlantic Division

- Bates
- Bowdoin
- Coast Guard "A"
- Coast Guard "B"
- MIT
- Middlebury
- Tufts
- Wellesley
- Yale

Northwest Division

- Oregon "A"
- Oregon "B"
- Oregon State
- Portland State
- Washington
- Western Washington

Pacific Coast Division

- Cal Poly "A"
- Cal Poly "B"
- Long Beach State
- UCLA "A"
- UCLA "B"
- UC Riverside
- UC Santa Barbara "A"
- UC Santa Barbara "B"
- USC

Rocky Mountain Division

- Air Force
- Colorado
- Colorado School of Mines
- Colorado State
- Denver
- New Mexico

Sierra Pacific Division

- California "A"
- California "B"
- UC Davis "A"
- UC Davis "B"
- California Maritime
- Cal State Chico
- Fresno State
- Saint Mary's (CA)
- San Jose State
- UC Santa Cruz "A"
- UC Santa Cruz "B"

Southeast Division

- UCF
- Emory
- Florida "A"
- Florida "B"
- FAU
- Florida State
- Georgia Tech

Southwest Division

- Arizona
- Arizona State
- UC Irvine
- UC San Diego "A"
- UC San Diego "B"
- San Diego
- San Diego State "A"
- San Diego State "B"

Texas Division

- Baylor
- Rice
- Texas
- Texas A&M "A"
- Texas A&M "B"
- Texas State

==== Women's Division III Collegiate Club Champions ====
- 2019 Middlebury College
- 2020 Cancelled due to COVID-19 pandemic
- 2021 Competition not held

==== Women's National Collegiate Club Champions ====
- 2000 University of Washington
- 2001 Michigan State University
- 2002 Michigan State University
- 2003 California Polytechnic State University
- 2004 California Polytechnic State University
- 2005 California Polytechnic State University
- 2006 Michigan State University
- 2007 Fresno State University
- 2008 California Polytechnic State University
- 2009 California Polytechnic State University
- 2010 California Polytechnic State University
- 2011 California Polytechnic State University
- 2012 University of California-Davis
- 2013 University of California-Davis
- 2014 San Diego State University
- 2015 University of California
- 2016 University of California-Santa Barbara
- 2017 University of California-Davis
- 2018 University of California-Davis
- 2019 University of Florida
- 2020 Cancelled due to COVID-19 pandemic
- 2021 Competition not held
- 2022 University of California
- 2023 University of Michigan
- 2024 University of Michigan
- 2025 University of California-Los Angeles

== See also ==
- USA Water Polo Hall of Fame
