= Western Water Polo Association =

American sporting association

- Association: NCAA
- Founded: 1981
- Commissioner: Christy Medigovich (since 2013)
- Sports fielded: 1; men's: 1; women's: 1
- Division: National Collegiate
- No. of teams: 8
- Region: Western United States, Illinois, Pennsylvania, and West Virginia
- Website: thewwpa.com

The Western Water Polo Association (WWPA) is a single sport college athletic conference sponsoring men's and women's water polo. The WWPA is affiliated with the NCAA, and includes 8 member institutions across California, Illinois, West Virginia, and Pennsylvania. The league has seven teams in its men's league and eight in its women's league, with Cal State Monterey Bay only fielding a women's team.

The WWPA members play a regular season of conference and non-conference games, followed by a championship tournament at the conclusion of both the men's and women's seasons, with the winner earning the league's automatic bid to the NCAAs.

== Members ==
NCAA water polo is a fall sport for men and a spring sport for women. For women's members, the year of joining is the calendar year before the first season of competition. For men's members, the year of departure is the calendar year after the final season of competition. All current institutions are members of NCAA Division II.

=== Men's teams ===
Institution	Location	Nickname	Joined	Primary Conference
Biola University	La Mirada, California	Eagles	2022	Pacific West
Concordia University–Irvine	Irvine, California	Eagles	2016	Pacific West
Fresno Pacific University	Fresno, California	Sunbirds	2014	Pacific West
Gannon University	Erie, Pennsylvania	Golden Knights	2023	Pennsylvania State
McKendree University	Lebanon, Illinois	Bearcats	2023	Great Lakes Valley
Salem University	Salem, West Virginia	Tigers	2023	Independent
University of California, Merced	Merced, California	Bobcats	2025	California

=== Women's teams ===
Institution	Location	Nickname	Joined	Primary Conference
Biola University	La Mirada, California	Eagles	2022	Pacific West
California State University, Monterey Bay	Seaside, California	Otters	2005	California
Concordia University–Irvine	Irvine, California	Eagles	2025	Pacific West
Fresno Pacific University	Fresno, California	Sunbirds	2017	Pacific West
Gannon University	Erie, Pennsylvania	Golden Knights	2014	Pennsylvania State
McKendree University	Lebanon, Illinois	Bearcats	2017	Great Lakes Valley
Salem University	Salem, West Virginia	Tigers	2018	Independent
University of California, Merced	Merced, California	Bobcats	2025	California

=== Former members ===
Institution	Location	Nickname	Joined	Left	Primary Conference	Division	(M)	(W)
United States Air Force Academy	Colorado Springs, Colorado	Falcons	1981	2023	Mountain West	NCAA D-I	✓	
California Baptist University	Riverside, California	Lancers	2013	2023	WAC	NCAA D-I	✓	
University of California, Davis (UC Davis)	Davis, California	Aggies	1981	2023	Big West	NCAA D-I	✓	
University of California, San Diego (UC San Diego)	San Diego, California	Tritons	1981	2023	Big West	NCAA D-I	✓	
University of California, San Diego (UC San Diego)	San Diego, California	Tritons	2015	2020	Big West	NCAA D-I		✓
Loyola Marymount University	Los Angeles, California	Lions	1987	2023	West Coast	NCAA D-I	✓	
Mercyhurst University	Erie, Pennsylvania	Lakers	2015	2024	Northeast	NCAA D-I		✓
Mercyhurst University	Erie, Pennsylvania	Lakers	2023	2024	Northeast	NCAA D-I	✓	
Santa Clara University	Santa Clara, California	Broncos	1981	2023	West Coast	NCAA D-I	✓	
Sonoma State University	Rohnert Park	Seawolves	2015	2020	CCAA	NCAA D-II		✓
