= Bids to college bowl games =

The teams that participate in the National Collegiate Athletic Association's Division I Football Bowl Subdivision earn the right to compete in a series of post-season games called bowl games. As of 2024, there are 42 bowl games (not counting the College Football Playoff National Championship), and all are contractually obligated to offer bids to specific conferences, a situation known as a "tie-in". The "top" six bowl games ("New Year's Six") in the nation select their teams as part of the College Football Playoff (CFP), which was put into place for a minimum of 12 years, beginning with the 2014 season. Prior to 2014, the top five games in the country were chosen under the system known as the Bowl Championship Series. The bowls outside of the CFP have individual contracts with the conferences to offer preferential bids to teams from those conferences. As long as teams are bowl eligible, they may be selected by these bowls to meet these contracts.

== College Football Playoff ==
The College Football Playoff consists of seven bowls: the Rose Bowl, Sugar Bowl, Orange Bowl, Cotton Bowl, Fiesta Bowl, Peach Bowl, and the College Football Playoff National Championship. First round games are played at the home stadium of the highest seed.

Twelve schools are selected for the playoff. The top five conference champions in the CFP rankings receive automatic bids. No conference will have an automatic bid. A conference must have a minimum of eight members for its champion to be eligible for a guaranteed bid.

=== "New Year's Six" bowl games ===
The New Year's Six bowl games make up the CFP quarterfinals and semifinals.

Games	First game
Capital One Orange Bowl	1935
Goodyear Cotton Bowl Classic	1937
Rose Bowl Game presented by Prudential	1902
Allstate Sugar Bowl	1935
Chick-fil-A Peach Bowl	1968
VRBO Fiesta Bowl	1971

*The top Group of Five champion will be placed into one of the At-Large spots, if they are not selected to be in the CFP.

=== Bowl Championship Series ===
From 1998 to 2013, the national champion was determined on the field by the Bowl Championship Series. The Bowl Championship Series consisted of five games, the Rose Bowl, Fiesta Bowl, Orange Bowl, and Sugar Bowl, as well as the BCS Championship Game. A composite system of computer rankings and human polls was used to rank the teams in the Division I–Football Bowl Subdivision. As with the College Football Playoff, the BCS consisted the champions of major conferences, at-large teams, and occasionally Notre Dame or teams from mid-major conferences. Consideration was given to historic associations between the conferences and the bowl games themselves. Tie-ins still apply, unless a team obligated to a certain bowl game is selected for the BCS Championship Game.

== Other bowl games ==
The bowls that are not part of the CFP have contractual ties to specific conferences. For the 2019–2020 bowl season, all bowls have at least two tie-ins, meaning that there are no at-large spots open in these bowls, assuming that all conferences produce enough bowl eligible teams. Many bowls also have contingency contracts to offer spots to other specific conferences should their first choice not be eligible. If any slot cannot be filled by a contracted conference at all, then the spot becomes open, and the bowl can offer the slot to any eligible team.

To be eligible, a team must have at least as many wins against FBS opponents as it has total losses in the regular season (excluding the conference championship game), except that a team may count one win against an FCS team that has given out at least 56.7 full scholarships per year over the past two years. (The number 56.7 comes from 90% of the pre-settlement limit of 63 full scholarships that an FCS team was allowed to have.) The exclusion of conference championship games was added after UCLA, which was the Pac-12 South representative in 2011, was 6–6 and lost the conference championship game that they participated only because of USC, which won the division that year, was on NCAA probation. The NCAA granted UCLA a waiver, and the exception appeared the following year, where the rule was used by Georgia Tech, the only eligible team among the three tied teams in the Coastal Division that was eligible for postseason because of NCAA probation, was also 6–6 and lost the conference championship game .)

If, as happened in 2015, there are more bowl game openings than eligible teams, then additional teams can become eligible. Teams are divided into four groups, which are added one at a time until there are enough teams to fill all of the bowls.The groups are:

1. A team that does not have a "counted" win against an FCS team, but beat an FCS team that did not meet the 90% scholarship requirement, and would have been bowl eligible had that game counted.
2. A team that plays 13 games in its regular season (excluding conference championship games, as that was previously referenced; a 13th game is possible if a team plays at Hawaii) and has a 6–7 record, since six wins is normally bowl eligible.
3. A team in the second year of an FCS to FBS transfer "probationary period" that would have been eligible had it been a full FBS member.
4. If there are still bowl openings remaining, enough teams with 5–7 or 5–6 counted records to fill the remaining spots become eligible. These are taken in order of the teams' most recent four-year football Academic Progress Rates (APRs), with ties broken by their one-year football APRs, starting with the most recent and working backwards.

.

Note that, once all of the bowl bids have been accepted, should a team have to withdraw, the bowl's organizer may choose any team not serving a postseason ban to replace it, regardless of its record or APR. In 2024, when Marshall withdrew from the Independence Bowl, that bowl selected Louisiana Tech to replace it, even though its APR was among the lowest among 5–7 teams.

=== Records vs. selection order ===
The contracts specify that the respective bowl committees receive a certain choice of teams. The selection order lists shown below (No. 1, No. 2, No. 3, etc.) indicate only the order in which the respective bowl committees make their selections. The choices are typically not predicated on end-of-season rankings or actually final regular season records/standings. For example, a bowl with the "# 3 pick" from a particular conference does not mean necessarily it has to select the "third place team" from that conference. When it becomes that committee's turn to pick, it may pick any of the remaining teams from that conference (with respect to the aforementioned eligibility rules detailed above).

A committee may select one team over another due to geographical proximity, travel ability for the fanbase, or other factors. Bowls may choose to "skip" teams in order to avoid regular season rematches, or perhaps bowl rematches from the previous season. In various cases, bowls have embraced a particular team(s) participating in same bowl in two consecutive seasons, but may shy away from inviting them for a third consecutive season. However, in most cases, the order loosely follows the general order of the regular season records/rankings.

Some conferences have special selection parameters written into their contracts with specific bowls—for example, the Citrus Bowl is contractually obligated to select the winningest Big Ten and SEC teams that do not make a CFP game, or a team within one win of the winningest in its conference. The MAC's bowl contracts require that both division champions, if eligible, receive bids to one of its five contracted bowls.

== Order of selection ==
Teams must be bowl-eligible to be selected for a bowl game. Should a conference not have enough eligible teams to meet their obligations, the bowls at the end of the selection process are free to choose a replacement team from among any remaining bowl-eligible teams that are not already committed to a bowl game. If a conference has more teams chosen for the College Football Playoff (CFP) than its table accounts for, the remaining bowls still select in the same order. For example, if two Big 12 teams are in the CFP, the Alamo Bowl would then have the third (and not second) selection from the Big 12, and all remaining bowls would also shift accordingly. This increases the likelihood that the conference will not be able to provide enough teams to meet its tie-in obligations.

=== American Conference ===
Pick	Name	Location	Opposing conference	Opposing pick
1	Fenway Bowl	Boston, Massachusetts	ACC	8/9/10/11/12
2	Military Bowl	Annapolis, Maryland	ACC	8/9/10/11/12
3/4/5/6/7/8 (Note: The American Conference is entitled to 6 selections out of the 9 bowls classified as potential destinations. This bowl usually features an American Conference team.)	First Responder Bowl	Dallas, Texas	All FBS Conferences	Last
3/4/5/6/7/8 (Note: The American Conference is entitled to 6 selections out of the 9 bowls classified as potential destinations.)	Myrtle Beach Bowl	Conway, South Carolina	Sun Belt	3/4/6
3/4/5/6/7/8	Cure Bowl	Orlando, Florida	Sun Belt	3/4/6
3/4/5/6/7/8	Boca Raton Bowl	Boca Raton, Florida	All FBS Conferences	Last
3/4/5/6/7/8	Frisco Football Classic	Frisco, Texas	All FBS Conferences	Last
3/4/5/6/7/8 (Note: The American Conference is entitled to 6 selections out of the 9 bowls classified as potential destinations. This bowl is unlikely to feature an American Conference team.)	New Mexico Bowl	Albuquerque, New Mexico	MWC or C-USA	4/5 (MWC) or 2/3/4/5/6 (C-USA)
3/4/5/6/7/8 (Note: The American Conference is entitled to 6 selections out of the 9 bowls classified as potential destinations. This bowl has never featured an American Conference team.)	Salute to Veterans Bowl	Montgomery, Alabama	Sun Belt or MAC	3/4/6 (Sun Belt) or 3 (MAC)
Backup (Note: If the SEC or Big 12 do not send a team to the Liberty Bowl, the American Conference will send a team.)	Liberty Bowl	Memphis, Tennessee	SEC or Big 12	3/4/5/6/7/8 (SEC) or 5 (Big 12)
Backup (Note: If the SEC or ACC do not send a team to the Gasparilla or Birmingham Bowl, the American Conference will send a team, counting towards one of its 6 entitled selections. The Gasparilla Bowl is usually viewed as a priority over the Birmingham Bowl in bowl allocations, therefore the Birmingham Bowl is more likely to feature an American Conference team.)	Gasparilla Bowl	Tampa, Florida	SEC or ACC	9/10 (SEC) or 8/9/10/11/12 (ACC)
Backup	Birmingham Bowl	Birmingham, Alabama	SEC or ACC	9/10 (SEC) or 8/9/10/11/12 (ACC)

=== Atlantic Coast Conference ===
Pick	Name	Location	Opposing conference	Opposing pick
1	College Football Playoff	Misc.	All FBS Conferences	N/A
2	Pop-Tarts Bowl	Orlando, Florida	Big 12	3
3/4	Holiday Bowl	San Diego, California	Legacy Pac-12 (Big Ten, Big 12, ACC, Oregon State, Washington State)	3
3/4	Gator Bowl	Jacksonville, Florida	SEC	3/4/5/6/7/8
5/6/7	Duke's Mayo Bowl	Charlotte, North Carolina	SEC or Big Ten (Note: The Big Ten and SEC alternate between the Duke's Mayo Bowl and the Las Vegas Bowl each year. In 2026, the SEC plays in the Las Vegas Bowl and the Big Ten plays in the Duke's Mayo Bowl.)	3/4/5/6/7/8 (SEC) or 4 (Big Ten)
5/6/7	Sun Bowl	El Paso, Texas	Legacy Pac-12 (Big Ten, Big 12, ACC, Oregon State, Washington State)	4
5/6/7	Pinstripe Bowl	New York City	Big Ten	6
8/9/10/11/12	Gasparilla Bowl	Tampa, Florida	SEC	9/10
8/9/10/11/12	Birmingham Bowl	Birmingham, Alabama	SEC	9/10
8/9/10/11/12	Fenway Bowl	Boston, Massachusetts	American	1
8/9/10/11/12	San Juan Bowl	San Juan, Puerto Rico	Sun Belt	1
8/9/10/11/12	Military Bowl	Annapolis, Maryland	American	2
13	ESPN Events Bowls	Misc.	All FBS Conferences	Last

=== Big 12 Conference ===
Pick	Name	Location	Opposing conference	Opposing pick
1	College Football Playoff	Misc.	All FBS Conferences	N/A
2	Alamo Bowl	San Antonio, Texas	Legacy Pac-12 (Big Ten, Big 12, ACC, Oregon State, Washington State)	1
3	Pop-Tarts Bowl	Orlando, Florida	ACC	2
4	Texas Bowl	Houston, Texas	SEC	3/4/5/6/7/8
5	Liberty Bowl	Memphis, Tennessee	SEC	3/4/5/6/7/8
6	Cactus Bowl	Tempe, Arizona	Big Ten	7
7	Independence Bowl	Shreveport, Louisiana	Legacy Pac-12 (Big Ten, Big 12, ACC, Oregon State, Washington State)	6
8	ESPN Events Bowls	Misc.	All FBS Conferences	Last

=== Big Ten Conference ===
Pick	Name	Location	Opposing conference	Opposing pick
1	College Football Playoff	Misc.	All FBS Conferences	N/A
2	Citrus Bowl	Orlando, Florida	SEC	2
3	ReliaQuest Bowl	Tampa, Florida	SEC	3/4/5/6/7/8
4	Las Vegas Bowl	Paradise, Nevada	Legacy Pac-12 (Big Ten, Big 12, ACC, Oregon State, Washington State)	2
4	Duke's Mayo Bowl	Charlotte, North Carolina	ACC	5/6/7
5	Music City Bowl	Nashville, Tennessee	SEC	3/4/5/6/7/8
6	Pinstripe Bowl	New York City	ACC	5/6/7
7	Cactus Bowl	Tempe, Arizona	Big 12	6

=== Conference USA ===
Pick	Name	Location	Opposing conference	Opposing pick
1	New Orleans Bowl	New Orleans, Louisiana	Sun Belt	2
2/3/4/5/6 (Note: C-USA is entitled to 5 selections out of the 14 bowls classified as potential destinations. This bowl usually features a C-USA team.)	New Mexico Bowl	Albuquerque, New Mexico	MWC	4/5
2/3/4/5/6 (Note: C-USA is entitled to 5 selections out of the 14 bowls classified as potential destinations.)	Puerto Rico Bowl	Bayamón, Puerto Rico	MAC	1
2/3/4/5/6	Myrtle Beach Bowl	Conway, South Carolina	Sun Belt	3/4/6
2/3/4/5/6	First Responder Bowl	Dallas, Texas	American	3/4/5/6/7/8
2/3/4/5/6	Cure Bowl	Orlando, Florida	Sun Belt	3/4/6
2/3/4/5/6	68 Ventures Bowl	Mobile, Alabama	Sun Belt	5
2/3/4/5/6	Armed Forces Bowl	Fort Worth, Texas	All FBS Conferences	Last
2/3/4/5/6	Boca Raton Bowl	Boca Raton, Florida	All FBS Conferences	Last
2/3/4/5/6	Frisco Bowl	Frisco, Texas	All FBS Conferences	Last
2/3/4/5/6 (Note: C-USA is entitled to 5 selections out of the 14 bowls classified as potential destinations. This bowl is unlikely to feature a C-USA team.)	Salute to Veterans Bowl	Montgomery, Alabama	Sun Belt or MAC	3/4/6 (Sun Belt) or 3 (MAC)
Backup (Note: If the Big 12 or Legacy Pac-12 do not send a team to the Independence Bowl, C-USA will send a team, counting towards one of its 5 entitled selections.)	Independence Bowl	Shreveport, Louisiana	Big 12 or Legacy Pac-12 (Big Ten, Big 12, ACC, Oregon State, Washington State)	7 (Big 12) or 6 (Legacy Pac-12)
Backup (Note: If the ACC or American do not send a team to the Fenway Bowl, C-USA may send a team, counting towards one of its 5 entitled selections.)	Fenway Bowl	Boston, Massachusetts	ACC or American	8/9/10/11/12 (ACC) or 1 (American)
Backup (Note: If the SEC or ACC do not send a team to the Gasparilla or Birmingham Bowl, C-USA will send a team, counting towards one of its 5 entitled selections. The Gasparilla Bowl is usually viewed as a priority over the Birmingham Bowl in bowl allocations, therefore the Birmingham Bowl is more likely to feature a C-USA team.)	Gasparilla Bowl	Tampa, Florida	SEC or ACC	9/10 (SEC) or 8/9/10/11/12 (ACC)
Backup	Birmingham Bowl	Birmingham, Alabama	SEC or ACC	9/10 (SEC) or 8/9/10/11/12 (ACC)

=== Mid-American Conference ===
Pick	Name	Location	Opposing conference	Opposing pick
1	Puerto Rico Bowl	Bayamón, Puerto Rico	All FBS Conferences	Last
2	Arizona Bowl	Tucson, Arizona	MWC	2
3 (Note: This bowl usually features a MAC team.)	Salute to Veterans Bowl	Montgomery, Alabama	Sun Belt	3/4/6
4	ESPN Events Bowls	Misc.	All FBS Conferences	Last

=== Mountain West Conference ===
Pick	Name	Location	Opposing conference	Opposing pick
1/6 (Note: If not selected for the College Football Playoff, the Mountain West champion will likely be selected to the Armed Forces Bowl or the Frisco Bowl. If more than three Mountain West teams are bowl eligible, the remaining teams will be assigned to the Armed Forces, Boca Raton, Famous Idaho Potato, Frisco, New Mexico and Puerto Rico bowls.)	Armed Forces Bowl	Fort Worth, Texas	All FBS Conferences	Last
1/6	Frisco Bowl	Frisco, Texas	All FBS Conferences	Last
2	Arizona Bowl	Tucson, Arizona	MAC	2
Hawaii or 3	Hawaii Bowl	Honolulu, Hawaii	Pac-12	2
4/5	New Mexico Bowl	Albuquerque, New Mexico	C-USA	2/3/4/5/6
4/5	Famous Idaho Potato Bowl	Boise, Idaho	Pac-12	3
6	Puerto Rico Bowl	Bayamón, Puerto Rico	MAC	1
6	Boca Raton Bowl	Boca Raton, Florida	All FBS Conferences	Last
Backup (Note: If the Big Ten or Big 12 do not send a team to the Cactus Bowl, the Mountain West will send a team.)	Cactus Bowl	Tempe, Arizona	Big Ten or Big 12	7 (Big Ten) or 6 (Big 12)

=== Pac-12 Conference ===
Legacy members
Pick	Name	Location	Opposing conference	Opposing pick
1	Alamo Bowl	San Antonio, Texas	Big 12	2
2	Las Vegas Bowl	Paradise, Nevada	SEC or Big Ten	3/4/5/6/7/8 (SEC) or 4 (Big Ten)
3	Holiday Bowl	San Diego, California	ACC	3/4
4	Sun Bowl	El Paso, Texas	ACC	5/6/7
5 (Note: The Poinsettia Bowl selects the top remaining Pac-12 team after College Football Playoff selections.)	Poinsettia Bowl	San Diego, California	Pac-12 (current members)	1
6	Independence Bowl	Shreveport, Louisiana	Big 12	7

Current members
Pick	Name	Location	Opposing conference	Opposing pick
1	Poinsettia Bowl	San Diego, California	Legacy Pac-12 (Big Ten, Big 12, ACC)	5
2	Hawaii Bowl	Honolulu, Hawaii	MWC	Hawaii or 3
3	Famous Idaho Potato Bowl	Boise, Idaho	MWC	4/5
4	ESPN Events Bowls	Misc.	All FBS Conferences	Last

=== Southeastern Conference ===
Pick	Name	Location	Opposing conference	Opposing pick
1	College Football Playoff	Misc.	All FBS Conferences	N/A
2	Citrus Bowl	Orlando, Florida	Big Ten	2
3/4/5/6/7/8	Las Vegas Bowl	Paradise, Nevada	Legacy Pac-12 (Big Ten, Big 12, ACC, Oregon State, Washington State)	2
3/4/5/6/7/8	ReliaQuest Bowl	Tampa, Florida	Big Ten	3
3/4/5/6/7/8	Gator Bowl	Jacksonville, Florida	ACC	3/4
3/4/5/6/7/8	Texas Bowl	Houston, Texas	Big 12	4
3/4/5/6/7/8	Music City Bowl	Nashville, Tennessee	Big Ten	5
3/4/5/6/7/8	Duke's Mayo Bowl	Charlotte, North Carolina	ACC	5/6/7
3/4/5/6/7/8	Liberty Bowl	Memphis, Tennessee	Big 12	5
9/10	Gasparilla Bowl	Tampa, Florida	ACC	8/9/10/11/12
9/10	Birmingham Bowl	Birmingham, Alabama	ACC	8/9/10/11/12

=== Sun Belt Conference ===
Pick	Name	Location	Opposing conference	Opposing pick
1	San Juan Bowl	San Juan, Puerto Rico	ACC	8/9/10/11/12
2	New Orleans Bowl	New Orleans, Louisiana	C-USA	1
3/4/6	Salute to Veterans Bowl	Montgomery, Alabama	MAC	3
3/4/6	Myrtle Beach Bowl	Conway, South Carolina	All FBS Conferences	Last
3/4/6	Cure Bowl	Orlando, Florida	All FBS Conferences	Last
5	68 Ventures Bowl	Mobile, Alabama	All FBS Conferences	Last
7	ESPN Events Bowls	Misc.	All FBS Conferences	Last

=== Division I FBS Independents ===
Of the independent Football Bowl Subdivision teams, only Notre Dame has contractual bowl agreements.

- Notre Dame – eligible for ACC-contracted bowls and is automatically selected to the College Football Playoff if ranked inside the top 12. However, Notre Dame cannot be selected by an ACC bowl if there is an eligible ACC team with at least two more wins than Notre Dame.
- UConn – UConn has no bowl tie-ins and is selected as an at-large team.

=== Division I FCS ===
For the only bowl game in the Football Championship Subdivision, the Celebration Bowl, the Southwestern Athletic Conference and Mid-Eastern Athletic Conference both have tie-ins. Each conference must send their champion to the game.

=== Division II ===
==== Lone Star Conference ====
The Lone Star Conference has a tie-in with the Heritage Bowl. The LSC is one of three conferences (the others being the MIAA and GAC) from which the bowl can draw its teams.

==== Mid-America Intercollegiate Athletics Association ====
The Mid-America Intercollegiate Athletics Association has a tie-in with the Heritage Bowl. The MIAA is one of three conferences (the others being the LSC and GAC) from which the bowl can draw its teams.

==== Great American Conference ====
The Great American Conference has a tie-in with the Heritage Bowl. The GAC is one of three conferences (the others being the MIAA and LSC) from which the bowl can draw its teams.

==== Great Lakes Valley Conference ====
The Great Lakes Valley Conference has a tie-in with the Albanese Candy Bowl against the Great Midwest Athletic Conference.

==== Great Midwest Athletic Conference ====
The Great Midwest Athletic Conference has a tie-in with the Albanese Candy Bowl against the Great Lakes Valley Conference.
