= 2026 Puerto Rico Bowl =

Postseason college football bowl game

2026 Sanders Grossman Law Puerto Rico Bowl
- 1st Puerto Rico Bowl
- Date: December 22, 2026
- Season: 2026
- Stadium: Juan Ramón Loubriel Stadium
- Location: Bayamón, Puerto Rico

United States TV coverage
- Network: ESPN

The 2026 Puerto Rico Bowl is a college football bowl game that is scheduled to be played on December 22, 2026, at Juan Ramón Loubriel Stadium located in Bayamón, Puerto Rico. The inaugural Puerto Rico Bowl game will feature teams from the Mid-American Conference and an at-large bid. The game is scheduled to begin at 1:30 p.m. EST and will air on ESPN. The Puerto Rico Bowl will be one of the 2026–27 bowl games concluding the 2026 FBS football season. The game is sponsored by Sanders Grossman Law, a personal injury law firm, and is officially known as the Sanders Grossman Law Puerto Rico Bowl.

== Teams ==
Based on conference tie-ins, the game will feature teams from the Mid-American Conference (MAC), and an at-large bid.

== Game summary ==
2026 Puerto Rico Bowl

Quarter	1	2	3	4	Total
	-	-	-	-	0
	-	-	-	-	0

at Juan Ramón Loubriel Stadium • Bayamón, Puerto Rico

- Date: Tuesday, December 22, 2026
- Game time: 1:30 p.m. EST
- TV: ESPN
