= Gloria Nevarez =

American athletic administrator

Current position
- Title: Commissioner
- Team: Mountain West

Biographical details
- Born: June 15, 1971 (age 55); San Jose, California, U.S.
- Education: University of Massachusetts, Amherst (BS); University of California, Berkeley (JD)

Playing career
- 1989–1992: UMass
- Position: Forward

Administrative career (AD unless noted)
- 1998–1999: San José State (asst. AD for compliance)
- 1999–2001: California (SWA)
- 2002–2007: West Coast Conference (assoc. commissioner & SWA)
- 2007–2010: Oklahoma (SWA)
- 2010–2018: Pac-12 Conference (Senior assoc. commissioner & SWA)
- 2018–2023: West Coast Conference (commissioner)
- 2023–present: Mountain West Conference (commissioner)

Gloria Elaine Nevarez (born June 15, 1971) is the current commissioner of the Mountain West Conference (MW). Nevarez assumed the position from retiring MW commissioner Craig Thompson on January 1, 2023. Before joining the MW, she had been the fourth full-time commissioner of the West Coast Conference (WCC). Nevarez is the first Hispanic-American to become a commissioner of an NCAA Division I conference. Prior to her duties as WCC commissioner, Nevarez served as a senior level administrator at the WCC as well as the Pac-12 Conference, University of Oklahoma, University of California, Berkeley, and San Jose State University.

== Early life and education ==
Nevarez was born in San Jose, California. She was raised in Santa Clara, California. Nevarez graduated from Santa Clara High School in 1989 and played on its basketball (as forward and center) and softball (as shortstop) teams. During the 1986-87 girls' basketball season, as a sophomore, Nevarez earned second team all-league honors. Nevarez followed up during her junior year by earning both third team all-regional honors and all-league first team honors during the 1987-88 girls' basketball season, and finished the 11th best scorer in the Peninsula region by "averag[ing] nearly 15 points per game last season". Her team finished 4th in the league. During the 1988-89 girls' basketball season, Nevarez earned second team all-regional honors and, once again, earned all-league second team honors.

Nevarez also earned second-team all-league honors during the 1988 girls' softball season. Nevarez went on to attend the University of Massachusetts (UMass), where she was a scholarship student-athlete in basketball under second-year head coach Kathy Hewelt. Nevarez graduated from UMass (cum laude) with a B.S. in Sports Management in 1993. After completion of her career at UMass, Nevarez attended the UC Berkeley School of Law where she graduated with a Juris Doctor in 1997

== Career ==
Finishing the completion of her J.D. degree, Nevarez began a career at a law firm. After a brief time practicing law, Nevarez was hired as the first full-time director of compliance for athletics at San Jose State University. From there, Nevarez returned to UC Berkeley, joining the athletic program staff as the Assistant Athletics Director of Compliance and Legal Affairs, while also serving as the interim Senior Woman Administrator. Following that, Nevarez began a term as the Associate Commissioner and Senior Woman Administrator for the West Coast Conference for the next five years. In August 2007, Nevarez was named Senior Associate Athletics Director and Senior Woman Administrator at the University of Oklahoma.

In March 2010, Nevarez was named Senior Associate Commissioner and Senior Woman Administrator of the Pac-10 Conference, known since 2011 as the Pac-12 Conference. During her time at the Pac-12, Nevarez oversaw all sports and championships except football and was the leagues' point person for men's basketball. Additionally, Nevarez was instrumental in the Pac-12's expansion from 10 institutions to 12, the relocation of the men's basketball tournament to Las Vegas, and the women's basketball tournament to Seattle. She was the lead on various international trips to China and Australia taken by Pac-12 teams, notably, Nevarez was instrumental in assisting UCLA when three players were arrested in China for stealing.

In March 2018, the West Coast Conference Presidents' Council selected Nevarez as its fourth full-time commissioner.

In November 2022, the Mountain West Conference Board of Directors selected Nevarez as the new commissioner; she officially assumed her duties on January 1, 2023.

== Personal ==
Nevarez is married to fellow UC Berkeley School of Law graduate Richard Young. Additionally, Nevarez has served as an adjunct faculty member at the University of San Francisco teaching on topics in sports law. Her father is of Mexican descent and her mother is of mixed Filipina and Irish ancestry.
