= Craig Thompson (sports administrator) =

American athletic administrator (born 1956)

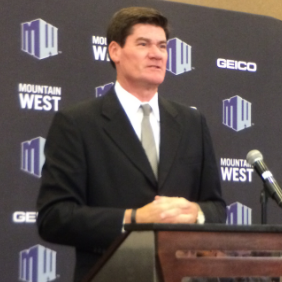
- Thompson at a press conference in 2016

Biographical details
- Born: August 1, 1956 (age 70); Estherville, Iowa, U.S.
- Education: University of Minnesota

Administrative career (AD unless noted)
- 1978–1980: Kansas State (asst. SID)
- 1980–1983: Kansas City Kings (dir. of public relations)
- 1983–1987: Metro Conference (dir. of communications)
- 1987–1991: American South Conference (commissioner)
- 1991–1998: Sun Belt Conference (commissioner)
- 1998–2022: Mountain West Conference (commissioner)

Craig Donald Thompson (born August 1, 1956) is an American athletic administrator. He became the commissioner of the Mountain West Conference (MW) upon the formation of the league in 1998 and served until retiring from the position at the end of 2022.

Thompson previously served as commissioner of the Sun Belt Conference from 1991 to 1998 and as the sole commissioner in the history of the American South Conference from 1987 to 1991. Thompson attended the University of Minnesota, graduating in 1978 with a bachelor's degree in journalism. After graduating, Thompson held several positions in public relations for Kansas State University, the NBA's Kansas City Kings and the Metro Conference. Thompson was named the first commissioner of the Mountain West Conference on October 15, 1998.

On September 14, 2022, Thompson announced that he would retire effective on December 31 of that year. The MW announced on November 11 that Thompson would be replaced by Gloria Nevarez, previously commissioner of the West Coast Conference.
