= Lamar Lady Cardinals volleyball =

American college volleyball team

- Founded: 1973
- University: Lamar University
- Athletic director: Jeff O'Malley
- Head coach: Ariel Apolinario
- Conference: Southland
- Location: Beaumont, Texas
- Home arena: McDonald Gym (capacity: 500)
- Colors: Red and white

AIAW/NCAA Regional Final
- +1976, +1977 +Regional Champions

AIAW/NCAA Tournament appearance
- 1983, 1984, 1993, 2008

Regional AIAW Tournament appearance
- 1975, 1976, 1977, 1979

Conference tournament champion
- 1983, 1984, *1987, **1993, 2008; Southland; *American South; **Sun Belt

Conference regular season champion
- *1990, **1997, 2001, 2007; Southland; *American South; **Sun Belt

The Lamar Lady Cardinals volleyball team represents Lamar University in the National Collegiate Athletic Association (NCAA) Division I. The Lady Cardinals compete in the Southland Conference and play their home games at McDonald Gym, an on campus facility in Beaumont, Texas. Ariel Apolinario was named head coach on January 5, 2024. He replaced former head coach Brandon Crisp who left the program on November 13, 2023.

== History ==
The Lady Cardinals have competed every season from 1973. Since 1982, the program has competed as an NCAA Division I program. From 1973 to 1981, the program competed in the Association for Intercollegiate Athletics for Women (AIAW) (1973–1981). As an AIAW member, the Lady Cardinals won the state AIAW championship in 1975 and finished seventh in the AIAW Nationals. The team won regional AIAW championships in 1976 and 1977 finishing ninth in the AIAW Nationals both years and finished fourteenth in the AIAW Nationals in 1979.

Competing as an NCAA Division I program, the team has won four regular season conference championships including one American South Conference championship (1990), one Sun Belt Conference championship (1997), and two Southland Conference championships (2001, 2007). The team also won five conference tournament championships including three Southland Conference championships (1983, 1984, 2008), one American South Conference championship (1987), and one Sun Belt Conference championship (1993). The Lady Cardinals participated in the NCAA Division I Volleyball tournament four times (1983, 1984, 1993, 2008). Their best conference record was in 2007 with a 15–1 regular season Southland Conference championship record under head coach Justin Gilbert.

== Awards and honors ==
=== AIAW All-Southwest Region ===
- Lucy Wiggins, 1975
- Laura Broughton, 1976
- Kathy MacEachern, 1976
- Melonie Floyd, 1980, '81

=== American South Conference ===
1st Team all conference

- Trisha Beissel, 1987
- Leanne Zeek, 1988, '89
- Cassi Presley, 1988
- Lisa Kachel, 1990
- Jenny Heisler, 1990

Tournament MVP

- Trisha Beissel, 1987

=== Southland Conference ===
Player of the year

- Liz Blue, 1983
- Natalie Sarver, 2002
- Molli Abel, 2007

Freshman of the year

- Wendy Krell, 2009
- Cortney Moore, 2011

Newcomer of the year

- Kathy Givens, 1983
- Trisha Beissel, 1984
- Charyl Norwood, 2000
- Shalayne Blythe, 2007
- Christine Hobbs, 2010

1st Team all conference

- Liz Blue, 1983
- Ruby Randolph, 1984, '85
- Veronica Carter, 1984, '85
- Georgia Briones, 1986
- Tracy Turner, 1986
- Charyl Norwood, 2001
- Urissa White, 2001
- Natalie Sarver, 2001, '02
- Buchi Okoh, 2006
- Molli Abel, 2007
- Adrian Meengs, 2007, '09
- Kaci Brewer, 2007
- Lauren Holdorff, 2008
- Jayme Bazile, 2010
- Chelsea Grant, 2015, '16

Coach of the year

- Katrinka Jo Crawford, 1983, '84
- Jim Barnes, 2001
- Justin Gilbert, 2007

=== Sun Belt Conference ===
Freshman of the year

- Mirian Erikson, 1991
- Kim Green, 1992

Most outstanding player

- Miriam Erikson, 1993

1st Team all conference

- Mirian Erikson, 1992, '93
- Shawn Flowers, 1993
- Kim Green, 1994
- Meredith Terrell, 1997
- Jaime Ewing, 1997

Coach of the year

- Jim Barnes, 1997

== Year-by-year results ==
Year-by-year results
Season	Conference	Coach	Overall				Conference				Notes
Season	Conference	Coach	Games	Win	Loss	Tie	Games	Win	Loss	Tie	Notes
AIAW Year-by-Year Results
1973		Claudia Perry	38	30	8	0	0	0	0	0	Results not available
1974		Claudia Perry	33	27	5	1	0	0	0	0	Results not available
		Claudia Perry	71	57	13	1					
1975		Rosie Petty	62	54	7	1	0	0	0	0	Texas AIAW State Champions, 7th AIAW Nationals
1976		Rosie Petty	62	43	16	3	0	0	0	0	Southwest AIAW Region Champions, 9th AIAW Nationals
1977		Rosie Petty	58	47	10	1	0	0	0	0	Southwest AIAW Region Champions, 9th AIAW Nationals
1978		Rosie Petty	48	37	10	0	0	0	0	0	No results available
		Rosie Petty	229	181	43	5					
1979		Linda Willis	49	37	12	0	0	0	0	0	No results available, 14 AIAW Nationals
1980		Linda Willis	59	26	33	0	0	0	0	0	
		Linda Willis	98	53	45	0					
1981		Katrinka Crawford	48	23	25	0	0	0	0	0	
	AIAW Overall		446	314	126	6					
NCAA Year-by-Year Results
1982	Southland	Katrinka Crawford	57	22	35	0	6	4	2	0	
1983	Southland	Katrinka Crawford	55	33	22	0	3	3	0	0	1st Southland South Division, SLC Tournament Champions, 1st Round NCAA tournament
1984	Southland	Katrinka Crawford	45	24	21	0	6	5	1	0	2nd Southland Conference, SLC Tournament Champions, 1st Round NCAA tournament
1985	Southland	Katrinka Crawford	46	32	14	0	6	5	1	0	2nd Southland Conference
1987	American South	Katrinka Crawford	38	20	18	0	6	6	0	0	1st American South Conference, American South tournament champions
1988	American South	Katrinka Crawford	44	19	25	0	10	8	2	0	2nd American South Conference
1989	American South	Katrinka Crawford	40	24	16	0	10	7	3	0	
1990	American South	Katrinka Crawford	44	30	14	0	12	11	1	0	American South Champions
1991	Sun Belt	Katrinka Crawford	36	20	16	0	5	4	1	0	2nd Sun Belt West
1992	Sun Belt	Katrinka Crawford	37	17	20	0	9	5	4	0	5th Sun Belt
1993	Sun Belt	Katrinka Crawford	36	24	12	0	9	7	2	0	3rd Sun Belt, Sun Belt Tournament Champions, 1st round NCAA tournament
1994	Sun Belt	Katrinka Crawford	29	12	17	0	9	6	3	0	5th Sun Belt
1995	Sun Belt	Katrinka Crawford	35	13	22	0	9	5	4	0	4th Sun Belt
		Katrinka Crawford	590	313	277	0	100	76	24	0	
1996	Sun Belt	Jim Barnes	33	20	13	0	9	3	6	0	6th Sun Belt
1997	Sun Belt	Jim Barnes	37	22	15	0	9	8	1	0	Sun Belt Champions
1998	Sun Belt	Jim Barnes	31	19	12	0	20	11	9	0	6th Sun Belt
1999	Southland	Jim Barnes	32	17	15	0	20	11	9	0	6th Southland
2000	Southland	Jim Barnes	35	24	11	0	20	12	8	0	5th Southland
2001	Southland	Jim Barnes	31	26	5	0	20	18	2	0	Southland Conference Champions
		Jim Barnes	199	128	71	0	98	63	35	0	
2002	Southland	Fiona Bolton-Simmons	33	26	7	0	20	17	3	0	2nd Southland
2003	Southland	Fiona Bolton-Simmons	31	10	21	0	20	3	17	0	10th Southland
2004	Southland	Fiona Bolton-Simmons	32	9	23	0	20	2	18	0	
		Fiona Bolton-Simmons	96	45	51	0	60	22	38	0	
2005	Southland	Justin Gilbert	29	8	21	0	16	6	10	0	8th Southland
2006	Southland	Justin Gilbert	33	13	20	0	16	8	8	0	2nd Southland East
2007	Southland	Justin Gilbert	34	25	9	0	16	15	1	0	Southland Conference Champions
2008	Southland	Justin Gilbert	29	17	12	0	16	12	4	0	Southland Conference Tournament Champions, NCAA Tournament 1st round
2009	Southland	Justin Gilbert	29	15	14	0	16	9	7	0	3rd Southland West
2010	Southland	Justin Gilbert	29	13	16	0	16	8	8	0	2nd Southland East
2011	Southland	Justin Gilbert	32	11	21	0	16	9	7	0	2nd Southland East
2012	Southland	Justin Gilbert	32	10	22	0	18	2	16	0	9th Southland
2013	Southland	Justin Gilbert	30	9	21	0	18	7	11	0	9th Southland
		Justin Gilbert	277	121	156	0	148	76	72	0	
2014	Southland	Alan Edwards	28	5	23	0	16	5	11	0	11th Southland
2015	Southland	Alan Edwards	30	14	16	0	16	4	12	0	10th Southland
2016	Southland	Alan Edwards	28	6	22	0	16	6	10	0	11th Southland
2017	Southland	Alan Edwards	26	4	22	0	16	2	14	0	11th Southland
		Alan Edwards	112	29	83	0	64	17	47	0	
2018	Southland	Michelle Kuester	27	7	20	0	16	4	12	0	11th Southland
2019	Southland	Michelle Kuester	26	9	17	0	16	4	12	0	12th Southland
		Michelle Kuester	53	16	37	0	32	8	24	0	
2020	Southland	Jordan Lay	17	1	16	0	12	1	11	0	12th Southland
2021	WAC	Jordan Lay	26	4	22	0	12	0	12	0	6th WAC Southwest Division
		Jordan Lay	43	5	38	0	24	1	23	0	
2022	Southland	Brandon Crisp	21	8	13	0	10	2	8	0	10th Southland
2023	Southland	Brandon Crisp	29	2	27	0	18	2	16	0	10th Southland
		Brandon Crisp	50	10	40	0	28	4	18	0	
2024	Southland	Ariel Apolinario									
		Ariel Apolinario									
	NCAA Overall		1370	644	726	0	552	267	288	0	
Team; Overall			1818	952	856	6	554	267	286	0	

(Results reflect games through November 11, 2023.)

== Postseason ==
=== NCAA Division I Tournament ===
Source: The Lady Cardinals have appeared in the NCAA Division I Women's Volleyball Championship four times. They have a record of 0–4.

Year	Round	Opponent	Result
1983	First round	Texas	L 0–3
1984	First round	Texas	L 0–3
1993	First round	Arizona	L 0–3
2008	First round	Texas	L 0–3

== Home court ==
While McDonald Gym has been home court since 2007, both McDonald Gym and the Montagne Center have served as home courts over the life of the program. The most recent move to the Montagne Center was when McDonald Gym was completely renovated in 2006-07 as part of the $17,800,000 126,000 sq ft Sheila Umphrey Recreational Center project. Following renovations, the volleyball team moved back to its current home, McDonald Gym.

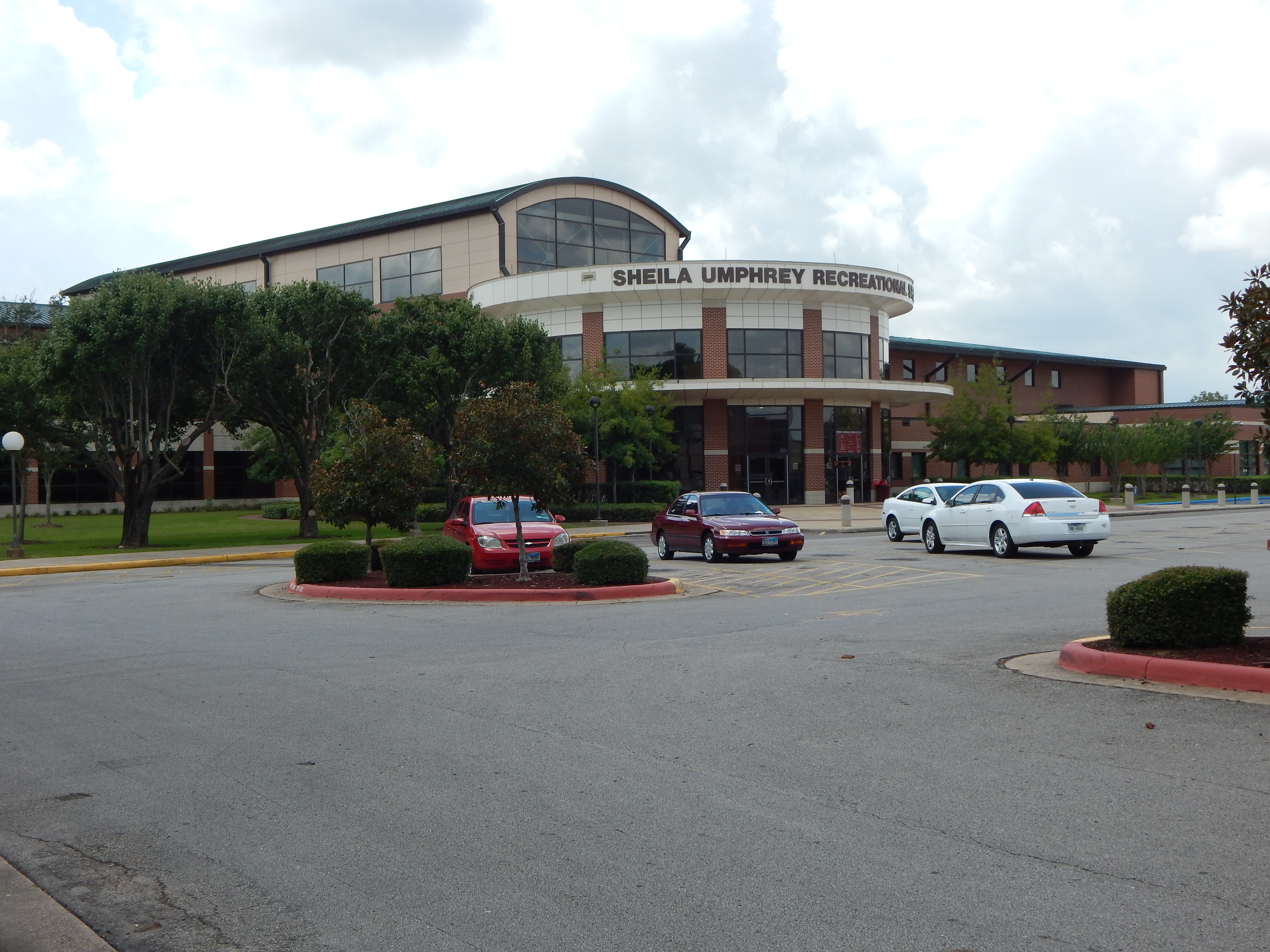
Sheila Umphrey Recreation Center and McDonald Gym

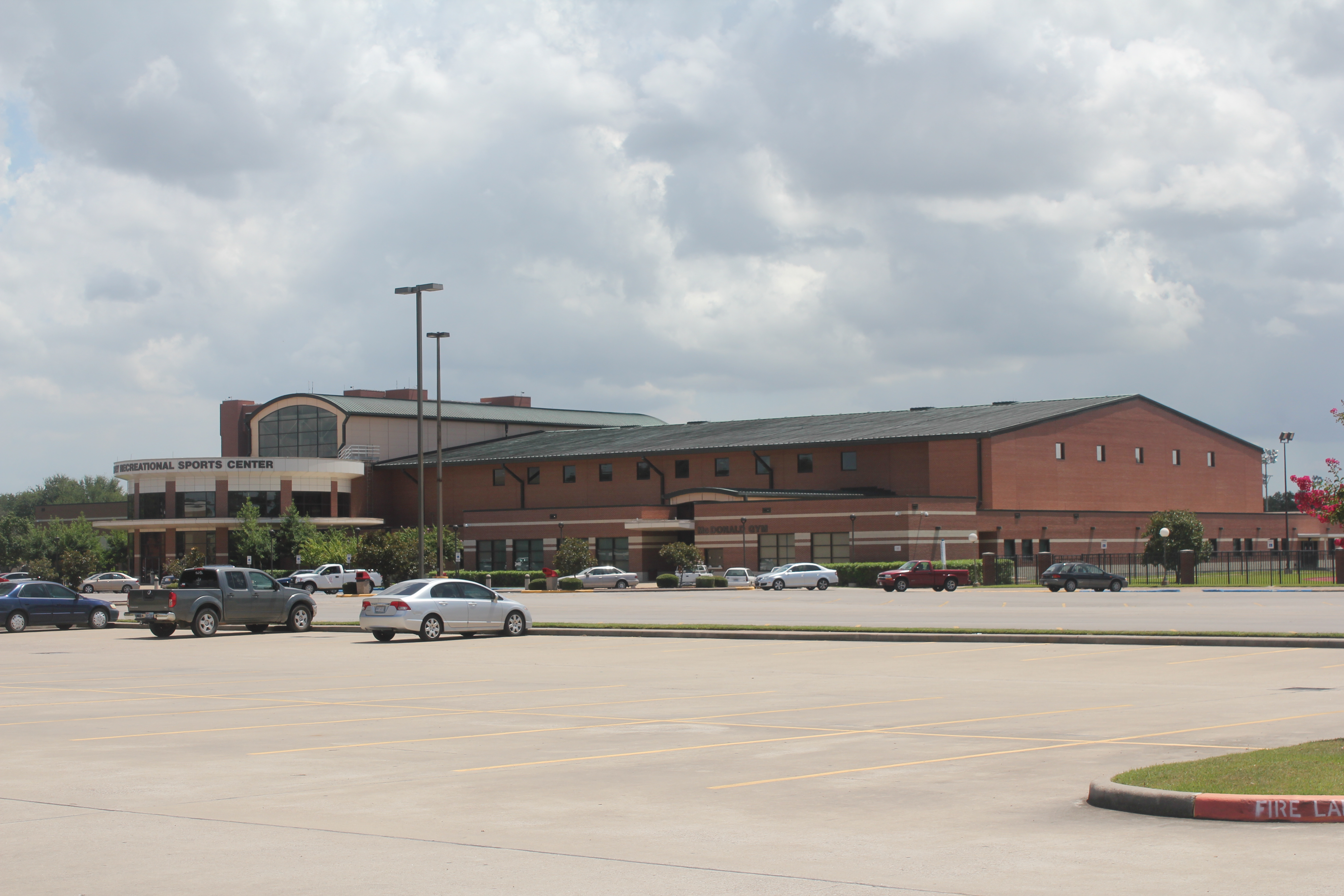
McDonald Gym and Sheila Umphrey Recreation Center

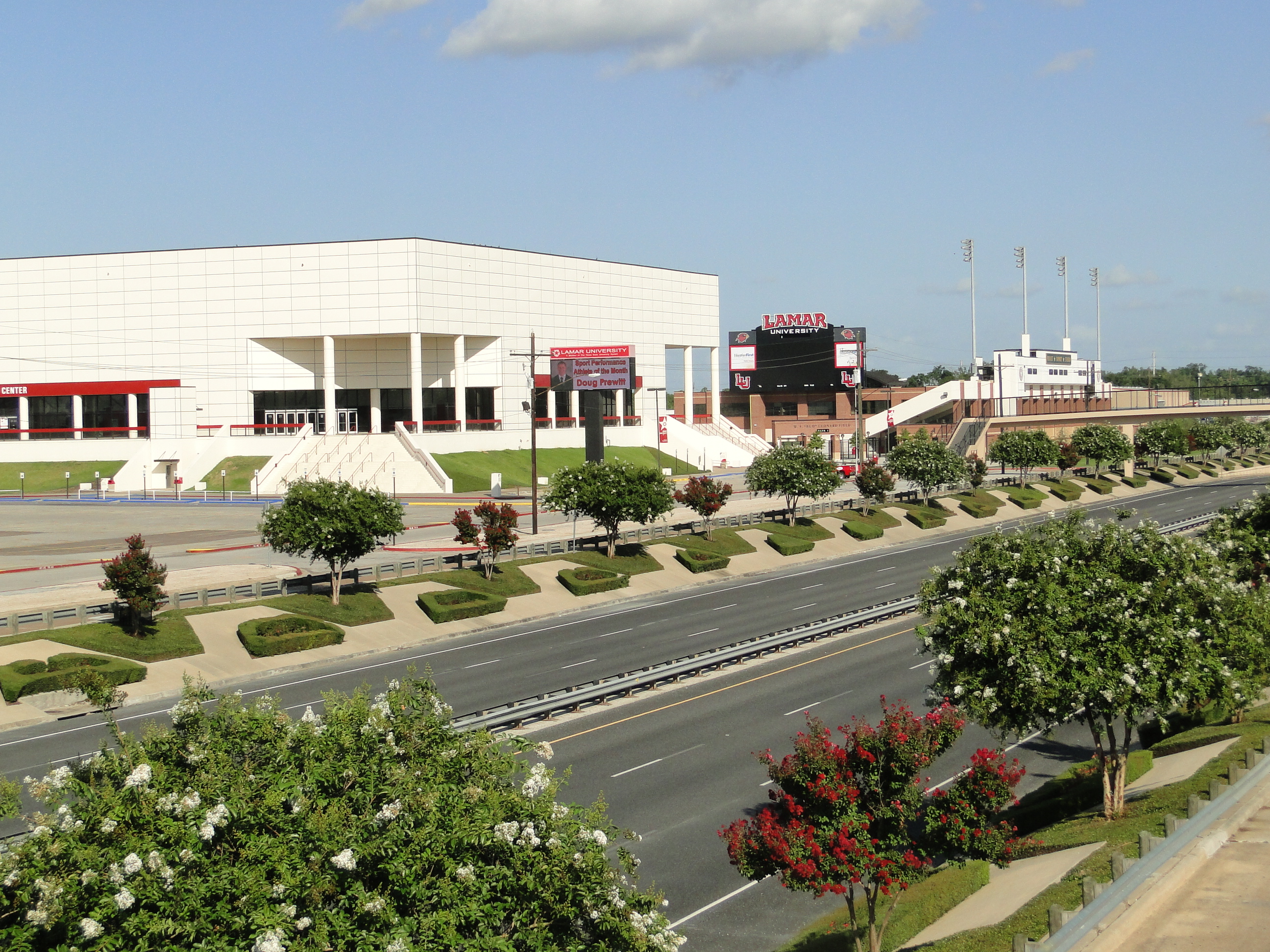
Montagne Center across the freeway

== See also ==
- List of NCAA Division I women's volleyball programs
