= Mountain West Conference =

American collegiate athletic conference

- Association: NCAA
- Founded: May 26, 1998; 28 years ago
- Commissioner: Gloria Nevarez (since January 1, 2023)
- Sports fielded: 23; men's: 11; women's: 12
- Division: Division I
- Subdivision: FBS
- No. of teams: 10
- Headquarters: Las Vegas, Nevada
- Region: Western United States
- Broadcasters: CBS Sports; Fox Sports; CW Sports
- Streaming partners: Kiswe; ESPN; Paramount+; Fox One
- Website: themw.com

Locations
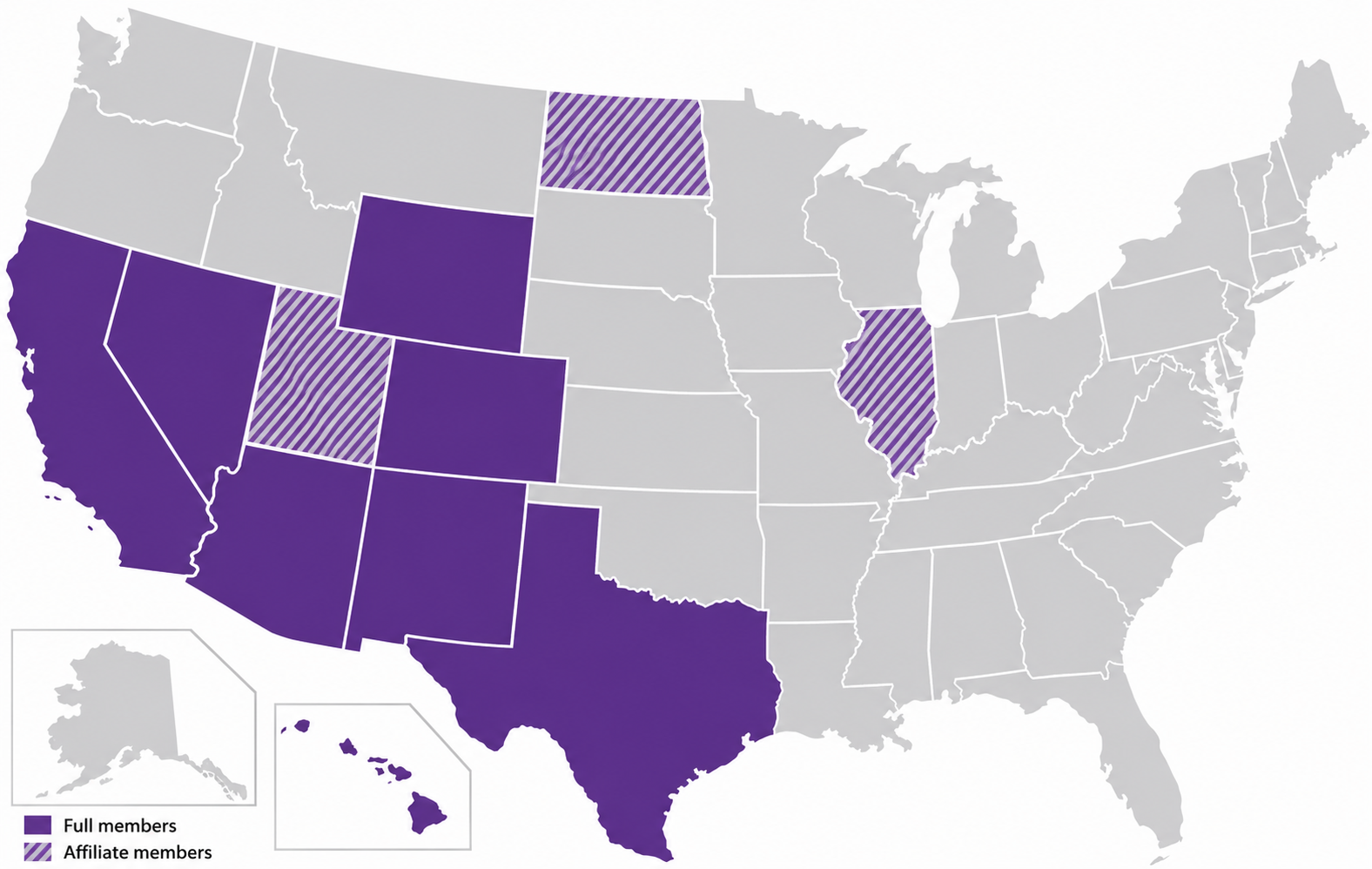

The Mountain West Conference (MW) is a collegiate athletic conference in the Western United States, participating in NCAA Division I. Its football teams compete in the Football Bowl Subdivision (FBS). The MW officially began operations on January 4, 1999. Geographically, the MW covers a broad expanse of the Western United States, with member schools located in Arizona, California, Colorado, Hawaii, Illinois, Nevada, New Mexico, North Dakota, Utah, Texas, and Wyoming. Gloria Nevarez took over as commissioner of the MW on January 1, 2023, following the retirement of founding commissioner Craig Thompson.

The charter members of the MW included the United States Air Force Academy, Brigham Young University, Colorado State University, San Diego State University, the University of New Mexico, the University of Nevada, Las Vegas, University of Utah and the University of Wyoming. Before forming the Mountain West Conference, all eight charter members had been members of the Western Athletic Conference (WAC) and half of these had been charter members of that conference from 1962.

== History ==
Mountain West Conference members
— Full member
— Full Member (Non-Football)
— Associate member

=== Genesis ===
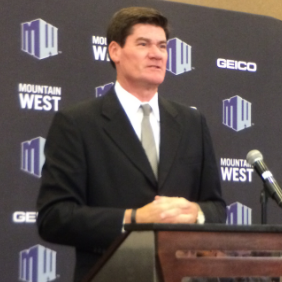
Craig Thompson was hired as the inaugural commissioner of the Mountain West on October 15, 1998, and served until his retirement on December 31, 2022. Before joining the MW, he had been commissioner of the Sun Belt Conference.

The creation of the MW was a delayed aftereffect of the 1996 NCAA conference realignment, which had initially been triggered two years earlier when the Big Eight Conference agreed to merge with four members of the Southwest Conference (SWC) to create the Big 12 Conference, which would begin competition in the 1996–97 school year.

The Western Athletic Conference, which had initially announced plans to expand beyond its then-current 10 members to at least 12, ended up with even more potential expansion prospects. Ultimately, the WAC took in three of the four SWC schools left out of the Big 12 merger, Rice University, Southern Methodist University (SMU), and Texas Christian University (TCU). Three other schools were added to bring the total membership to 16, namely Big West Conference members San José State University and UNLV, plus the University of Tulsa, an NCAA football independent and otherwise a member of the Missouri Valley Conference. The WAC's 16 teams were divided into four four-team "quadrants", two of which rotated between the Mountain and Pacific Divisions every two years. However, the newly expanded WAC was soon wracked by tension between the established and new members.

In spring of 1998, BYU and Utah proposed a permanent split into two eight-team divisions. The proposal would have forced some schools into an unnatural alignment because of the geographic distribution of the conference. Air Force was the most strident opponent of this proposal, threatening to become an independent. Soon after the proposal by BYU and Utah, the presidents of Air Force, BYU, Colorado State, Utah, and Wyoming met at Denver International Airport to discuss their future, and they agreed to break away from the WAC to form a new conference. They invited the WAC members New Mexico, San Diego State, and UNLV to join them in what became the Mountain West Conference.

The next move for the MW came in 2005, when the conference added TCU, who had spent the previous four seasons in Conference USA (C-USA).

=== Early-2010s realignment ===
On June 11, 2010, Boise State University agreed to join the conference as its tenth member. On June 17, 2010, Utah announced it would be leaving the Mountain West to join what would become the Pac-12 Conference. On August 18, 2010, amidst rumors that BYU was considering leaving the Mountain West to go independent in football and rejoin the Western Athletic Conference in all other sports, the Mountain West Conference officially extended invitations to California State University, Fresno (Fresno State) and the University of Nevada, Reno (Nevada). Both schools accepted and would become the tenth and eleventh members of the league. BYU announced on August 31, 2010, that it would leave the Mountain West Conference and go Independent in football and become a member of the West Coast Conference (WCC) in other sports starting in 2011. On November 29, 2010, TCU announced all athletic teams would move to the Big East Conference effective in 2012. (Less than a year later, on October 10, 2011, TCU announced it would not join the Big East but would join the Big 12, home to fellow former SWC members Baylor, Texas, Texas Tech, and formerly Texas A&M, in 2012 instead.) On December 10, 2010, the University of Hawaiʻi at Mānoa accepted a bid to become the 10th member of the conference for football only. These changes would leave the Mountain West Conference with 10 teams for the 2012 football season.

During the era of football's Bowl Championship Series (BCS), which was replaced by the College Football Playoff (CFP) in 2014, the MW champion qualified for a BCS bowl four times after the BCS formula was tweaked to allow teams from non-BCS conferences to play in BCS bowls if ranked in the top 12. However, two of the three schools that qualified are no longer with the conference.

On October 14, 2011, the Mountain West and C-USA announced a plan for a football only alliance. On February 13, 2012, the two leagues announced that both conferences would be dissolving after the 2012–13 season to reform into one conference with at least 15 members for all sports, and a 16th team, University of Hawaiʻi at Mānoa as a football-only member. However, when the two conferences discussed their plans with the NCAA, they were told that due to NCAA rules, they would forfeit substantial revenues. Specifically, the new conference would receive only one automatic bid to NCAA championships; at least one of the former conferences would lose future revenue distributions from the NCAA men's basketball tournament; and at least one former conference would not be able to collect exit fees from any members that departed to join the new conference. As a result, the Mountain West and C-USA backed away from a full merger. In late March of that year, the commissioners of both conferences stated that all 16 schools had entered into binding agreements to form a new "association", although the Mountain West and C-USA would have apparently remained separate legal entities. In the end, this alliance never materialized due to both conferences soon adding new teams.

On May 2, 2012, San José State and Utah State agreed to join the conference for the 2013–14 academic year. On December 31 of that year, Boise State announced that it had backed out of its previously announced move to the Big East for football and the Big West for other sports, and would remain in the MW.

On January 16, 2013, San Diego State accepted an offer to remain/return to the Mountain West Conference in all sports. Keeping SDSU in the conference gave the Mountain West 12 football members, allowing for a championship game to be held. The first championship game took place on December 7, 2013.

=== Further membership changes ===
In February 2018, The San Diego Union-Tribune reported that the MW was looking to expand in the near future. In the report, commissioner Craig Thompson revealed that the conference had discussed expansion with six schools, with WCC member Gonzaga (which has not sponsored football since World War II) the only school mentioned by name. Thompson added that Gonzaga could potentially join the MW as a full but non-football member as early as July 2018. While Thompson said that BYU had not contacted the conference, the report indicated that BYU would be open to an MW return, at least in non-football sports, should Gonzaga join. A later Union-Tribune report indicated that talks were advanced enough that the conference's presidents planned a vote on an invitation to Gonzaga during the MW men's and women's basketball tournaments in Las Vegas, but decided to delay the vote until after the Final Four. However, on April 2, the day of the Division I men's title game, Gonzaga athletic director Mike Roth notified the MW, the WCC, and media that the school would remain in the WCC for the immediate future.

On June 30, 2022, UCLA and Southern Cal announced their departure from the Pac-12 Conference to the Big Ten Conference beginning in the 2024–25 academic year. After that announcement, San Diego State had been considered one of the top candidates for Pac-12 expansion. On June 16, 2023, Pete Thamel of ESPN reported that San Diego State had given the Mountain West Conference notice that the school would be departing from the conference and asked for an extension for the departure deadline of July 1, 2023, to avoid paying extra exit fees. The Mountain West Conference denied the request for a deadline extension and considered the letter from San Diego State as a formal notice of departure and began to proceed with the separation process; however, San Diego State disputed that its letter of intent was a formal notice. On June 30, 2023, with the Pac-12 still lacking a media rights agreement for 2024–25, ESPN reported that San Diego State would remain in the Mountain West Conference, rescinding the intention to withdraw from the conference. The MW and San Diego State reached a settlement of their dispute the following month, with SDSU remaining a member for the immediate future.

In September 2023, after a mass exodus from the Pac-12 left Oregon State and Washington State as its only remaining members, MW commissioner Gloria Nevarez began discussions with the two schools regarding various options for partnership, affiliation, or merger. On December 1, 2023, the conference announced that it would enter into a football scheduling agreement with the two schools for the 2024 season. All 12 Mountain West members would play one game against either Oregon State or Washington State in the 2024 season, giving both schools three home games and three away games. These games did not count towards Mountain West conference standings, and Oregon State and Washington State remained members of the Pac-12. On April 16, 2024, it was also announced that Washington State would be joining the MW as an affiliate for baseball and women's swimming.

On September 12, 2024, it was announced that Boise State, Fresno State, Colorado State, and San Diego State would be leaving the MW and joining the Pac-12 in 2026. On September 24, Utah State also accepted an offer to join the Pac-12 in 2026 as its seventh member.

On October 1, 2024 it was announced that the University of Texas at El Paso (UTEP) would be joining the Mountain West starting in the 2026–27 academic year. On October 14, Craig Angelos, athletic director of football-only member Hawaii, confirmed outside reports that the school would upgrade to full MW membership in 2026. This move was officially announced the next day. On November 1, 2024, Grand Canyon University announced it was joining the Mountain West no later than July 1, 2026. On July 8, 2025, the Mountain West announced Grand Canyon would join the conference for the 2025-26 school year.

On December 10, 2024 it was announced that UC Davis would join the Mountain West Conference in all sports except football, for which it will remain in the Big Sky Conference. This move happened on July 1, 2026.

On January 3, 2025, Northern Illinois University accepted an invitation from the MW to join for football only in 2026. The move became official on January 7, after approval by NIU's governing board. On October 2, 2025, the MW announced that NIU would also join for women's gymnastics in 2026. On October 29, 2025, it was announced that the Mountain West would begin sponsoring both men's soccer and men's swimming and diving for the 2026-27 school year. Alongside them, Utah Tech announced it would join as a baseball and men's soccer affiliate.

On February 8, 2026, North Dakota State University accepted an invitation to join the Mountain West Conference as a football-only affiliate member beginning with the 2026 season. Under the terms of the agreement, North Dakota State will transition its football program from the Missouri Valley Football Conference to the Mountain West, while the university’s other sports will remain members of the Summit League.

In July 2026, the MW moved its headquarters from Colorado Springs, Colorado, where it had been based since its founding, to the Las Vegas Valley, specifically to the Town Square development south of the Las Vegas Strip in the unincorporated community of Enterprise.

== Member schools ==
=== Current full members ===
Institution	Location	Founded	Type	Enrollment	Median earnings	Endowment (2026; millions)	Nickname	Joined (Note: Represents the calendar year when fall sports competition begins.)	Colors
United States Air Force Academy (Air Force)	Air Force Academy, Colorado (Note: Virtually all of the Air Force Academy grounds, including the cadet area and all athletic facilities, are outside the city limits of Colorado Springs. The US Census Bureau and US Postal Service consider the Academy to be its own entity, respectively designating it as "Air Force Academy" and "USAF Academy".)	1954	Federal (Military)	4,181	—	$156.5 (2024)	Falcons	1999	
Grand Canyon University (Note: Non-football member.)	Phoenix, Arizona	1949	Private (Non-denominational)	25,300 (Note: On-campus enrollment)	$74,343	$547.2 (2025)	Antelopes	2025	
University of California, Davis (UC Davis) (Note: Non-football member.)	Davis, California	1905	Public	40,848	$73,086	$865.4	Aggies	2026	
University of Hawaiʻi at Mānoa	Honolulu, Hawaii	1907	Public	19,097	$61,093	$706.8	Rainbow Warriors/Wahine	2026	
University of Nevada, Reno	Reno, Nevada	1874	Public	21,034	$67,498	$640.3	Wolf Pack	2012	
University of Nevada, Las Vegas (UNLV)	Las Vegas, Nevada (Note: The UNLV campus lies outside the Las Vegas city limits in the unincorporated area of Paradise. The US Postal Service considers all unincorporated communities in the Las Vegas Valley, including Paradise, to have a Las Vegas address.)	1957	Public	30,660	$62,637	$393.4	Rebels	1999	
University of New Mexico	Albuquerque, New Mexico	1889	Public	21,738	$59,818	$1,000.0	Lobos	1999	
San José State University	San Jose, California	1857	Public	32,432	$89,614	$231.1	Spartans	2013	
University of Texas at El Paso (UTEP)	El Paso, Texas	1913	Public	25,121	$58,771	$386.8	Miners	2026	
University of Wyoming	Laramie, Wyoming	1886	Public	12,238	$61,749	$900.0 (2024)	Cowboys & Cowgirls	1999	

=== Current affiliate members ===
Institution	Location	Founded	Type	Enrollment	Endowment (2026; millions)	Nickname	Joined (Note: Represents the calendar year when fall sports competition begins.)	Colors	MW sport	Primary conference
Colorado College	Colorado Springs, Colorado	1874	Nonsectarian	2,266	$1,064.0	Tigers	2014		Women's soccer	Southern (SCAC) (Note: Currently an NCAA Division III athletic conference)
North Dakota State University (NDSU)	Fargo, North Dakota	1890	Public	11,609	$486.2 (2024)	Bison	2026		Football	Summit
Northern Illinois University (NIU)	DeKalb, Illinois	1895	Public	16,078	$131.4	Huskies	2026		Football	Horizon
Northern Illinois University (NIU)	DeKalb, Illinois	1895	Public	16,078	$131.4	Huskies	2026		Women's gymnastics	Horizon
Utah Tech University	St. George, Utah	1911	Public	13,207	$37.2 (2024)	Trailblazers	2026		Baseball	Big Sky
Utah Tech University	St. George, Utah	1911	Public	13,207	$37.2 (2024)	Trailblazers	2026		Men's soccer	Big Sky

=== Former full members ===
Institution	Location	Founded	Type	Enrollment	Nickname	Joined (Note: Represents the calendar year when fall sports competition begins.)	Left (Note: Represents the calendar year when spring sports competition ends.)	Colors	Current conference
Boise State University	Boise, Idaho	1932	Public	26,155	Broncos	2011	2026		Pac-12
Brigham Young University (BYU)	Provo, Utah	1875	LDS Church	34,390	Cougars	1999	2011		Big 12
California State University, Fresno (Fresno State)	Fresno, California	1911	Public	25,047	Bulldogs	2012	2026		Pac-12
Colorado State University	Fort Collins, Colorado	1870	Public	33,648	Rams	1999	2026		Pac-12
Texas Christian University (TCU)	Fort Worth, Texas	1873	Disciples of Christ	11,938	Horned Frogs	2005	2012		Big 12
San Diego State University	San Diego, California	1897	Public	32,599	Aztecs	1999	2026		Pac-12
University of Utah	Salt Lake City, Utah	1850	Public	34,900	Utes	1999	2011		Big 12
Utah State University	Logan, Utah	1888	Public	27,943	Aggies	2013	2026		Pac-12

=== Membership timeline ===
Full members Full members (non-football) Associate members (football only) Assoc. member (list sports) Independent Other conference 1 Other conference 2

== NCAA team championships ==
School	Team Championships				Non-NCAA DI Team Championships (Note: Excluded from this list are all national championships earned outside the scope of NCAA Division I competition, including Division I FBS football titles, women's AIAW championships, and retroactive Helms Athletic Foundation titles.)			
School	Total	Men	Women	Co-ed	Total	Men	Women	Co-ed
UTEP	21	21	0	0	0	0	0	0
San Jose State	10	7	3	0	92	55	34	3
Hawaii	6	3	3	0	2	0	2	0
New Mexico	3	0	2	1	0	0	0	0
Wyoming	3	1	0	2	1	0	1	0
UNLV	2	2	0	0	0	0	0	0
UC Davis	0	0	0	0	11	3	8	0
Nevada	0	0	0	0	10	7	1	2
Grand Canyon	0	0	0	0	8	8	0	0
Air Force	0	0	0	0	2	0	2	0
Total	24	13	8	3	126	73	48	5

=== Affiliate member championships ===
Totals only include Mountain West affiliated sports.

School	Team Championships			
School	Total	Men	Women	Co-ed
Colorado College	0	0	0	0
North Dakota State	0	0	0	0
Northern Illinois	0	0	0	0
Utah Tech	0	0	0	0
Total	0	0	0	0

== Sports ==
The Mountain West Conference sponsors championship competition in eight men's and 11 women's NCAA sanctioned sports. Hawai'i is only an associate member for football, and Colorado College is only an associate member for women's soccer.

Teams in Mountain West competition (Note: Numbers of teams are as of the 2025–26 school year)
Sport	Men's	Women's
Baseball	7	–
Basketball	11	11
Cross country	9	11
Football	12	–
Golf	11	9
Gymnastics	–	4
Soccer	6	12
Softball	–	9
Swimming and diving	5	9
Tennis	7	11
Track and field (indoor)	8	11
Track and field (outdoor)	8	11
Volleyball	–	11

=== Men's sports ===
Member	Baseball	Basketball	Cross country	Football	Golf	Soccer	Swimming and Diving	Tennis	Track & field indoor	Track & field outdoor	Total MW sports
Air Force	Yes	Yes	Yes	Yes	Yes	Yes	Yes	Yes	Yes	Yes	10
UC Davis	Yes	Yes	Yes	No (Note: UC Davis plays football at the FCS level as an affiliate member of the Big Sky Conference.)	Yes	Yes	No	Yes	No	Yes	7
Grand Canyon	Yes	Yes	Yes	No	Yes	Yes	Yes	Yes	Yes	Yes	9
Hawai'i	Yes	Yes	No	Yes	Yes	No	Yes	Yes	No	No	6
Nevada	Yes	Yes	Yes	Yes	Yes	No	No	Yes	No	No	6
UNLV	Yes	Yes	No	Yes	Yes	Yes	Yes	Yes	No	No	7
New Mexico	Yes	Yes	Yes	Yes	Yes	No	No	Yes	Yes	Yes	8
San Jose State	Yes	Yes	Yes	Yes	Yes	Yes	No	No	Yes	Yes	8
UTEP	No	Yes	Yes	Yes	Yes	No	No	No	Yes	Yes	6
Wyoming	No	Yes	Yes	Yes	Yes	No	Yes	No	Yes	Yes	7
Current Totals	8+1 (Note: Affiliate member Utah Tech)	10	8	8+2 (Note: Affiliate members North Dakota State and Northern Illinois)	10	5+1	5	7	6	7	72+4

==== Men's varsity sports not sponsored by the Mountain West ====
Future members in green.

School	Fencing	Gymnastics	Ice hockey	Lacrosse	Rifle (Note: Rifle is technically a men's sport, but men's, women's, and coed teams all compete against each other. Air Force fields a coed team.)	Skiing	Volleyball	Water polo	Wrestling
Air Force	Independent	MPSF	AHA	ASUN	PRC			WCC (Note: Joining the Big West in 2027.)	Pac-12
Hawai'i							Big West		
Nevada						RMISA			
San Jose State								WCC	
UC Davis								WCC	
Wyoming									Big 12

=== Women's sports ===
Member	Basketball	Cross country	Golf	Gymnastics	Soccer	Softball	Swimming & diving	Tennis	Track & field indoor	Track & field outdoor	Volleyball	Total MW sports
Air Force	Yes	Yes	No	Yes	Yes	No	Yes	Yes	Yes	Yes	Yes	9
UC Davis	Yes	Yes	Yes	Yes	Yes	Yes	Yes	Yes	Yes	Yes	Yes	11
Grand Canyon	Yes	Yes	Yes	No	Yes	Yes	Yes	Yes	Yes	Yes	Yes	10
Hawai'i	Yes	Yes	Yes	No	Yes	Yes	Yes	Yes	Yes	Yes	Yes	10
Nevada	Yes	Yes	Yes	No	Yes	Yes	Yes	Yes	Yes	Yes	Yes	10
UNLV	Yes	Yes	Yes	No	Yes	Yes	Yes	Yes	Yes	Yes	Yes	10
New Mexico	Yes	Yes	Yes	No	Yes	Yes	Yes	Yes	Yes	Yes	Yes	10
San Jose State	Yes	Yes	Yes	Yes	Yes	Yes	Yes	Yes	Yes	Yes	Yes	11
UTEP	Yes	Yes	Yes	No	Yes	Yes	No	No	Yes	Yes	Yes	8
Wyoming	Yes	Yes	Yes	No	Yes	No	Yes	Yes	Yes	Yes	Yes	9
Current Totals	10	10	9	3+1 (Note: Affiliate member Northern Illinois)	10+1 (Note: Affiliate member Colorado College)	8	9	9	10	10	10	93+2

==== Women's varsity sports not sponsored by the Mountain West ====
Future members in green. Departing members in pink.

School	Beach volleyball	Equestrian (Note: Part of the NCAA Emerging Sports for Women program.)	Fencing	Field hockey	Lacrosse	Rifle (Note: Rifle is technically a men's sport, but men's, women's, and coed teams all compete against each other. Air Force and UTEP respectively field coed and women-only teams.)	Sailing (Note: Not organized by the NCAA.)	Skiing	Water polo
Air Force			MPSF			PRC			
Grand Canyon	MPSF (Note: Joining the Big West in 2027.)								
Hawai'i	Big West						PCCSC		Big West
Nevada								RMISA	
San Jose State	MPSF								Golden Coast
UC Davis	WCC	ECAC		MPSF	Big 12				Golden Coast
UTEP	CUSA					PRC			

== Financials ==
=== Conference distributions ===
The following table shows Mountain West Conference distributions during the fiscal year beginning 07-01-2024 ending 06-30-2025 as reported by ProPublica using Schedule A of the Mountain West Conference tax filing submitted on May 15, 2026.

Institution	2024–25 Distribution
UNLV	$8,842,026
San José State	$8,462,470
New Mexico	$8,392,318
Wyoming	$8,210,984
Nevada	$8,116,659
Air Force	$7,122,822
Hawaiʻi	$3,320,747
Average of 11 full share members	$9,096,354.64

=== CNBC list of the most valuable Mountain West schools ===
Rankings as of December 19, 2025 (2024–2025 academic year)

MWC	NCAA	School	Valuation	Value Change	Revenue	Revenue Change
1	75	UNLV Rebels	$190 million	New entry	$61 million	New entry

=== Athletic department revenue by school ===
Total revenue includes ticket sales, contributions and donations, rights and licensing, student fees, school funds and all other sources including TV income, camp income, concessions, and novelties.

Total expenses includes coach and staff salaries, scholarships, buildings and grounds, maintenance, utilities and rental fees, recruiting, team travel, equipment and uniforms, conference dues, and insurance.

The following table shows institutional reporting to the United States Department of Education as shown on the DOE Equity in Athletics website for the 2024–25 academic year. Since Air Force is not available from that source, it was obtained from Knight Commission for the 2024–2025 academic year.Schools in italics are affiliate members.

Institution	2024–25 Total Revenue from Athletics	2024–25 Total Expenses on Athletics
United States Air Force Academy	$87,262,660	$78,771,360
University of Nevada, Las Vegas	$77,272,658	$74,767,674
University of New Mexico	$61,160,745	$56,544,018
University of Hawaiʻi at Mānoa	$53,793,049	$53,793,049
University of Nevada, Reno	$53,153,531	$53,153,531
University of Wyoming	$50,399,891	$50,399,891
University of California, Davis	$46,854,471	$46,854,471
San José State University	$42,944,067	$42,944,067
North Dakota State University	$34,788,259	$34,212,041
Northern Illinois University	$34,342,695	$34,342,695
Grand Canyon University	$33,277,918	$33,277,918
University of Texas at El Paso	$32,413,794	$32,413,794
Utah Tech University	$23,448,672	$18,870,761
Colorado College	$12,665,376	$12,665,376

== Apparel ==
Schools in italics are affiliate members.

School	Provider
Air Force	Nike
Colorado College	Nike
Grand Canyon	Nike
Hawaiʻi	Nike
Nevada	Adidas
New Mexico	Nike
North Dakota State	Under Armour
Northern Illinois	Adidas
San Jose State	Under Armour
UC Davis	Adidas
UNLV	Nike
Utah Tech	Nike
UTEP	Adidas
Wyoming	Adidas

== Commissioners ==
Since the birth of the conference in 1999, the Mountain West has had two commissioners:

Name	Years	Tenure	Conference name(s)
Craig Thompson	1999–2022	23 years	Mountain West Conference
Gloria Nevarez	2024–present	3 years	Mountain West Conference

== Rivalries ==
=== Conference (football) ===
Totals and records following the completion of the 2025 football season.

Teams		Rivalry name	Trophy	Meetings (last)	Record	Series leader
Hawai'i	Air Force	Air Force–Hawai'i football rivalry	Kuter Trophy	24 (2025)	14–9–1	Air Force
Hawai'i	San José State	Dick Tomey Legacy Game	Dick Tomey Legacy Trophy	48 (2026)	25–22–1	San José State
Hawai'i	UNLV	Hawai'i–UNLV football rivalry	Island Showdown Trophy	35 (2025)	19–16	Hawai'i
Hawai'i	Wyoming	Hawai'i–Wyoming football rivalry	Paniolo Trophy	28 (2025)	11–17	Wyoming
Nevada	UNLV	Battle for Nevada	Fremont Cannon	51 (2025)	29–22	Nevada
New Mexico	UTEP	New Mexico–UTEP football rivalry	N/A	9 (2026)	5-4-0	UTEP
North Dakota State	Wyoming	Battle of the Basins	The Basins Trophy	2 (2026)	1-1-0	Tied

=== Non–conference (including other sports) ===
Mountain West Team	Opponent(s)	First meeting	Game	Trophy	Reigning champion (last meeting)	Next meeting
Air Force	Army & Navy	1972		Commander-in-Chief's Trophy	Navy (2025)	2026
Air Force	Colorado State	1957	Air Force–Colorado State football rivalry	Ram–Falcon Trophy	Air Force (2025)	
Hawai'i	Fresno State	1938	Battle for the Golden Screwdriver	Golden Scewdriver	Fresno State (2025)	
Northern Illinois	Ball State	1941	Ball State–Northern Illinois football rivalry	Bronze Stalk Trophy	Northern Illinois (2025)	
New Mexico	Arizona	1908	Arizona–New Mexico football rivalry	Kit Carson Rifle	Arizona (2024)	No future games scheduled at the moment
New Mexico	New Mexico State	1894	Rio Grande Rivalry	The Chile Roaster	New Mexico (2026)	2027
Nevada	Boise State	1971	Boise State–Nevada football rivalry	none	Boise State (2025)	
North Dakota State	South Dakota State	1903	Dakota Marker	Dakota Marker	North Dakota State (2025)	
San José State	Stanford	1900	Bill Walsh Legacy Game	none	Stanford (2025)	2028
San José State	Fresno State	1921	Battle for the Valley	Valley Trophy	Fresno State (2025)	2026
UC Davis	Sacramento State	1954	Causeway Classic	Causeway Core	UC Davis (2025)	No future games scheduled at the moment
UC Davis	Cal Poly	1939	Battle for the Golden Horseshoe	The Golden Horseshoe	UC Davis (2025)	2026
UTEP	New Mexico State	1914	Battle of I-10	Silver Spade Trophy and the Mayor's Cup	New Mexico State (2025)	2027
Wyoming	Colorado State	1899	Border War	Bronze Boot	Wyoming (2025)	2026

== Football ==
=== Bowl games ===
The Mountain West Conference has agreements with six bowls.

Since the 2014 season, the Mountain West champion is eligible for an at-large berth in the Cotton Bowl Classic, Fiesta Bowl, or Peach Bowl, if it is the highest-ranked conference champion among the "Group of Five" conferences (which also includes The American, CUSA, MAC, and Sun Belt) in the final College Football Playoff rankings, if it is not in the top 4. In the 2014 season, Boise State became the first team to receive this berth, being selected for and winning the Fiesta Bowl.

As of 2026:

Pick	Name	Location	Opposing conference	Opposing pick
Non–specific	Boca Raton Bowl	Boca Raton, Florida	G6	Non–specific
Non–specific	Hawaii Bowl	Honolulu, Hawaii	American	Non–specific
Non–specific	Famous Idaho Potato Bowl	Boise, Idaho	MAC	Non–specific
Non–specific	New Mexico Bowl	Albuquerque, New Mexico	CUSA	Non–specific
Non–specific	Armed Forces Bowl	Fort Worth, Texas	Big 12 And G6	Non–specific
Non–specific	Puerto Rico Bowl	Bayamón, Puerto Rico	MAC	Non–specific
Non–specific	Snoop Dogg Arizona Bowl	Tucson, Arizona	MAC	Non–specific
Non–specific	Scooter's Coffee Frisco Bowl	Frisco, Texas	American	Non–specific
Conditional*	Cactus Bowl	Phoenix, Arizona	Big 10 And Big 12	Non–specific
Conditional*	ESPN Owned/Operated Bowls			

- If Hawaii is bowl eligible and not MW champions or selected for a CFP bowl, they will receive a berth in the Hawaii Bowl.
- The MW will only send a team to the Cactus or San Francisco Bowls if one of the primary conferences affiliated with those bowls is unable to fill their slots.

=== Bowl records ===
As of the 2024-25 bowl games

School	Appearances	W	L	T	Win %	BCS/ NY6	National championships
Air Force	30	16	13	1	.550	0–0	0
NIU	16	6	10	0	.375	1–0	0
Nevada	18	7	12	0	.368	0–0	0
Wyoming	18	10	9	0	.526	0–0	0
Hawai'i	14	8	6	0	.571	0–1	0
New Mexico	14	4	9	1	.346	0–0	0
San Jose State	14	7	7	0	.500	0–0	0
UTEP	19	8	11	0	.421	0–0	0
UNLV	6	4	2	0	.667	0–0	0
North Dakota State	0	0	0	0	–	0–0	0

=== Bowl Challenge Cup ===
ESPN created the Bowl Challenge Cup in 2002 for the conference that had the best college football bowl record among Division I Football Bowl Subdivision conferences. The conference has won it five times, more than any other conference, by finishing with bowl game records of 2–1 in 2004–05, 4–1 in 2007–08, 4–1 in 2009–10, 4–1 in 2010–11 and 5–1 in 2021–22.

== Men's basketball ==
The Mountain West and Missouri Valley Conferences hold an annual challenge series that was renewed in the 2015–16 season after a two-year hiatus. The series began in the 2009–10 season but temporarily ended when the original contract ran out after the 2012–13 season, During the first four seasons of the series, it involved all members of the MW and an equal number of the 10 MVC teams in basketball. With the MW now having 11 basketball members to the MVC's 10, the renewed series involves all MVC teams, with one MW team sitting out.

The first game was on November 13, 2009, featuring the Bradley Braves and the BYU Cougars in Provo and it concluded on December 23 with the Wyoming Cowboys visiting the Northern Iowa Panthers in Cedar Falls, Iowa. The challenge is similar to the ACC-Big Ten Challenge, which pits men's basketball teams from the Atlantic Coast Conference and the Big Ten Conference.

=== NCAA tournament records ===
As of the 2023–24 NCAA Division I men's basketball season

School	Appearances	W	L	Win %	Wins per appearance	National championships
UNLV	20	33	19	.635	1.650	1 (1990)
UTEP	18	14	18	.438	0.000	1 (1966)
New Mexico	16	10	16	.385	0.533	0
Wyoming	16	9	21	.300	0.563	1 (1943)
Nevada	11	6	11	.353	0.600	0
Hawaii	9	4	8	.333	0.000	0
Grand Canyon	5	1	5	.167	0.000	0
Air Force	4	0	4	.000	0.000	0
San Jose State	3	0	3	.000	0.000	0
UC Davis	1	1	1	.500	0.000	0

== Women's basketball ==
=== NCAA tournament records ===
School	Appearances	W	L	Win %	Wins per appearance	National championships
UNLV	10	3	10	.231	0.300	0
New Mexico	8	3	8	.273	0.375	0
Hawaii	7	2	7	.222	0.000	0
Wyoming	2	0	2	.000	0.000	0
UTEP	3	1	2	.333	0.000	0
UC Davis	3	0	3	.000	0.000	0
Air Force	0	0	0	–	0.000	0
Nevada	0	0	0	–	0.000	0
San Jose State	0	0	0	–	0.000	0

== Facilities ==
School	Football stadium	Capacity	Basketball arena	Capacity	Baseball stadium	Capacity	Soccer stadium	Capacity
Air Force	Falcon Stadium	39,441	Clune Arena	5,858	Erdle Field	1,000	Cadet Soccer Stadium	3,000
Colorado College	Women's soccer-only member						Stewart Field	1,000
Grand Canyon	Non-football school		Global Credit Union Arena	7,500	Brazell Field	4,500	GCU Stadium	6,000
Hawaiʻi	Clarence T. C. Ching Athletics Complex (Note: Temporary stadium until the new Aloha Stadium is completed.)	15,000	Stan Sheriff Center	10,300	Les Murakami Stadium	4,312	Waipiʻo Peninsula Soccer Stadium	4,500
Nevada	Mackay Stadium	27,000	Lawlor Events Center (Note: Nevada men's basketball currently plans to move to a new 10,000-seat off-campus arena at the Grand Sierra Resort in 2027. The Lawlor Events Center will remain home to women's basketball.)	12,000	William Peccole Park	3,000	Mackay Stadium	27,000
New Mexico	University Stadium	39,224	The Pit-Powered by Nusenda	15,411	Lobo Baseball Field	1,000	UNM Soccer Complex	6,200
North Dakota State	Fargodome	18,700	Football-only member					
Northern Illinois	Brigham Field at Huskie Stadium	23,595	Football-only member					
San Jose State	CEFCU Stadium	21,520	Provident Credit Union Event Center	5,000	Excite Ballpark	4,200	Spartan Soccer Complex	1,560
UC Davis	Non-football member (Note: UC Davis competes in the Big Sky Conference (FCS) for football. They play their home games at UC Davis Health Stadium, which seats 10,367.)		University Credit Union Center	7,600	Dobbins Stadium	3,500	Aggie Soccer Field	1,000
UNLV	Allegiant Stadium	65,000	Thomas & Mack Center (men); Cox Pavilion (women)	17,923; 2,500	Earl Wilson Stadium	3,000	Peter Johann Memorial Soccer Field	2,500
Utah Tech	Baseball and men's soccer-only member				Bruce Hurst Field	2,500	Greater Zion Stadium	6,500
UTEP	Sun Bowl Stadium	51,500	Don Haskins Center	12,222	Non-baseball school		University Field	5,000
Wyoming	War Memorial Stadium	30,514	Arena-Auditorium	11,612	Non-baseball school		Madrid Sports Complex	700

== Elevation ==
The Mountain West's slogan is "Above the rest", and over half of the member institutions, plus women's soccer-only member Colorado College, are at more than 4,000 feet (1,200 meters) above sea level. This impacts endurance in sports like football, soccer, and the distance races in track & field and swimming meets; air resistance in sprints and horizontal jumps in track & field; and aerodynamics in baseball, softball, tennis, golf, and the discus and javelin throws. The Mountain West's institutions have the highest average elevations in NCAA Division I sports.

=== Campus and football stadium elevations ===
Schools in italics are single-sport members. In the case of women's soccer-only member Colorado College, "stadium elevation" refers to the school's soccer venue.

School	Campus elevation (ft)	Stadium elevation (ft)
Air Force	7,258	6,621
Wyoming	7,220	7,220
Colorado College	6,053	6,053
New Mexico	5,174	5,100
Nevada	4,564	4,610
UTEP	3,700	3,910
Utah Tech	2,880	2,860
UNLV	2,024	2,190
Grand Canyon	1,086	N/A
North Dakota State	900	900
Northern Illinois	871	870
Hawaii	105	19
San Jose State	85	93
UC Davis	49	47
