= Mid-American Conference =

U.S. college sports conference

- Association: NCAA
- Founded: 1946; 80 years ago
- Commissioner: Jon Steinbrecher (since 2009)
- Sports fielded: 24; men's: 11; women's: 13
- Division: Division I
- Subdivision: FBS
- No. of teams: 12
- Headquarters: Cleveland, Ohio
- Region: Great Lakes, New England, California
- Broadcasters: ESPN; CBS Sports (via ESPN); MyNetworkTV (via ESPN; WMU Broncos only); RESN (via ESPN; Ohio schools only); FanDuel Sports Net (EMU Eagles only); BCSN (Toledo and BGSU only); Scripps Sports (via BCSN; Toledo Rockets only)
- Website: getsomemaction.com

Locations

The Mid-American Conference (MAC) is a collegiate athletic conference with a membership base mostly in the Great Lakes region, stretching from Massachusetts to California. Its members compete in National Collegiate Athletic Association (NCAA) Division I. For football, the conference participates in the NCAA's Football Bowl Subdivision. Nine of the twelve full member schools are in Ohio and Michigan, with single members located in Indiana, Massachusetts, California, and New York.

The MAC is headquartered in the Public Square district in downtown Cleveland, Ohio, and has two members in the nearby Akron area. The conference ranks highest among all ten NCAA Division I FBS conferences for graduation rates.

== History ==
The five charter members of the Mid-American Conference were Ohio University, Butler University, the University of Cincinnati, Wayne University (now Wayne State University), and Western Reserve University, one of the predecessors to today's Case Western Reserve University. Wayne University left after the first year. Miami University and Western Michigan University took the place of those charter members for the 1948 season. The MAC added the University of Toledo (1950), Kent State University (1951), and Bowling Green State University (1952). The University of Cincinnati resigned its membership February 18, 1953, with an effective date of June 1, 1953. Cincinnati's decision was based on a new requirement that at least 5 conference football games would have to be scheduled each season, university president Raymond Walters saying they "...regretfully resign...as the university could not continue under the present setup..."

The membership was steady for the next two decades except for the addition of Marshall University in 1954 and the departure of Western Reserve in 1955. Marshall was expelled from the conference in 1969 due to NCAA violations. The first major expansion since the 1950s took place in the mid-1970s with the addition of Central Michigan University and Eastern Michigan University in 1972 and Ball State University and Northern Illinois University in 1973. NIU left after the 1985–86 season. The University of Akron joined the conference in 1992. The conference became the largest in Division I-A with the re-admittance of Marshall and NIU in 1997 and addition of the Bulls from the University at Buffalo in 1998. The University of Central Florida, a non-football all-sports member in the Atlantic Sun Conference at the time, joined for football only in 2002, becoming the first football-only member in conference history. Marshall and Central Florida left after the 2004–05 academic year, both joining Conference USA in all sports.

In May 2005, the Temple Owls in Philadelphia signed a six-year contract with the MAC as a football-only school and began play in the East Division in 2007.

The Louisville Cardinals were a MAC affiliate for field hockey for a number of years when Louisville was a member of the Metro Conference and Conference USA, winning two MAC tourney titles in 2003 and 2004.

The Missouri State Bears, Evansville Purple Aces, and Southern Illinois Salukis participate in the MAC for men's swimming and diving. In 2012, the West Virginia Mountaineers joined the Florida Atlantic Owls and Hartwick College Hawks as men's soccer affiliates. Florida Atlantic departed upon joining Conference USA in 2013. Hartwick's contract was not renewed by the MAC in 2015. Nine schools are wrestling affiliates; most became affiliates when the MAC absorbed the former Eastern Wrestling League in 2019. Appalachian State University and Longwood University are associates in field hockey; Missouri State had also been a member in that sport from 2005 until dropping field hockey after the 2016 season. Binghamton University is an affiliate in men's tennis. In June 2017, SIU Edwardsville (SIUE) was invited to become an affiliate member in both men's soccer and wrestling in 2018. When Buffalo suddenly dropped four sports, including men's soccer, SIUE's move in that sport was made immediately.

The UMass Minutemen joined the MAC as a football-only member in July 2012; the university announced that the team would leave the MAC at the end of the 2015 season due to contractual issues. Meanwhile, Temple ended its affiliation with the MAC in football and joined the Big East for football in July 2012. Following the split of the Big East into football-sponsoring and non-football conferences in July 2013, Temple became a full member of the football-sponsoring portion, the American Athletic Conference, ending its membership in the Atlantic 10 at that time. The Chicago State Cougars were an affiliate for men's tennis until joining the Western Athletic Conference, which sponsors that sport, in July 2013.

The conference unveiled the addition of women's lacrosse to its sport sponsorship in November 2019. Lacrosse began competing under the MAC banner with six teams in the 2021 season with MAC members Akron, Central Michigan and Kent State joined by associate members Detroit Mercy, Robert Morris, and Youngstown State. Eastern Michigan became the seventh women's lacrosse member when it added the sport in the 2022 season.

At the end of the 2022 season, the MAC discontinued men's soccer as a sponsored sport. While the conference realignment of the early 2020s did not affect the MAC's core membership up to that time, it significantly impacted the amount of men's soccer sponsoring programs within the conference, and ultimately led to the conference lacking enough teams to maintain its automatic bid to the NCAA tournament. Of the four full MAC members that sponsored men's soccer in the 2022 season, Bowling Green, Northern Illinois, and Western Michigan moved the sport to the Missouri Valley Conference, and Akron moved it to the Big East Conference.

The MAC eliminated its East and West divisions for football in January 2024. The divisions had already been eliminated for other sports in 2020. Later that year, in late February, it was announced that the UMass Minutemen and Minutewomen will join the conference as a full member beginning in 2025, returning UMass football to the MAC. In July, the conference announced that it would begin sponsoring women's rowing for the 2025–26 season; full members Eastern Michigan, Toledo, and UMass would be joined by affiliate members Delaware, High Point, and Temple.

On January 3, 2025, it was reported that Northern Illinois had accepted an invitation from the Mountain West Conference to join as an affiliate member for football in 2026. This move was made official on January 7, after approval by NIU's governing board. Current MAC bylaws stipulate that all members must play football within the conference; correspondingly, multiple media reports in February 2025 indicated that NIU was set to rejoin the Horizon League, a non-football conference in which it had been a member from 1994 to 1997, in 2026. This move was also made official on February 27, after approval by NIU's governing board. NIU applied to maintain MAC affiliate membership in women's gymnastics and men's wrestling, neither of which the Horizon sponsors. However, this did not come to pass, and NIU instead joined the Mountain West and the Pac-12 Conference as an affiliate for those respective sports. In football, NIU's membership was effectively replaced by the addition of Sacramento State in July 2026, resulting in the conference's footprint in that sport stretching from Massachusetts to California.

Sacramento State is officially moving to the FBS level and will be joining the Mid-American Conference (MAC) as a football-only member starting in July 2026 for a five-year term. As a distant member, Sacramento State faces heavy travel, but this is viewed as a necessary step for FBS status. Only the football program is joining the Mid-American Conference (MAC). They will compete in the Big West in all other sports. They will be the first western based team ever to join the Mid-American Conference (MAC). Sacramento State will as part of its agreement to join the Mid-American Conference (MAC) cover all air travel costs for visiting conference football teams to Sacramento. This arrangement is for the duration of the five-year term beginning July 1, 2026. The school must pay an $18 million entry fee just to join the Mid-American Conference (MAC), with $6 million due in the first year. An additional $5 million must be paid to the NCAA for the transition from FCS to FBS. Sacramento State President Luke Wood projects that the move will generate nearly $975 million in local economic impact for the school over the five-year period. It is not known at this point if the former FCS school who tried to join the new Pac-12 and Mountain West prior to this will remain in the conference after the 5-year agreement. The school was actually at one point denied by the NCAA the right to become an FBS school.

== Member universities ==
=== Membership map ===
Mid-American Conference
Location of full MAC members: current member

=== Current full members ===
There are twelve public universities with full membership:

Institution	Location	Founded	Type	Enrollment (Fall 2025)	Median earnings	Endowment (millions)	Nickname	Joined (Note: Represents the calendar year when fall sports competition begins.)	Colors
University of Akron	Akron, Ohio	1870	Public	15,318	$62,809	$235	Zips	1992	
Ball State University	Muncie, Indiana	1918	Public	20,200	$57,619	$325	Cardinals	1973	
Bowling Green State University	Bowling Green, Ohio	1910	Public	19,484	$54,998	$155	Falcons	1952	
University at Buffalo	Buffalo, New York	1846	Public	32,347	$71,430	$1,020	Bulls	1998	
Central Michigan University	Mount Pleasant, Michigan	1892	Public	14,500	$61,298	$246	Chippewas	1971	
Eastern Michigan University	Ypsilanti, Michigan	1849	Public	12,176	$59,616	$94	Eagles	1971	
Kent State University	Kent, Ohio	1910	Public	26,822	$56,839	$301	Golden Flashes	1951	
University of Massachusetts Amherst (UMass)	Amherst, Massachusetts	1863	Public	31,300	$78,620	$672	Minutemen & Minutewomen	2025 (Note: UMass was a MAC affiliate in football from the 2012 to 2015 fall seasons (2012-13 to 2015-16 school years).)	
Miami University	Oxford, Ohio	1809	Public	22,460	$70,785	$814	RedHawks	1947	
Ohio University	Athens, Ohio	1804	Public	30,682	$70,528	$879	Bobcats	1946	
University of Toledo	Toledo, Ohio	1872	Public	13,165	$66,084	$625	Rockets	1950	
Western Michigan University	Kalamazoo, Michigan	1903	Public	17,331	$62,885	$760	Broncos	1947	

=== Current affiliate members ===
As of 2026–27, 21 schools have MAC affiliate membership status. On July 1, 2012, Temple joined the Big East Conference for football only (the school's other sports would join the Big East/American for 2013–14), and Massachusetts replaced Temple as a football-only member in the MAC East Division. On September 19, 2012, the MAC announced Missouri, Northern Iowa and Old Dominion would join as wrestling affiliates; as the Southeastern and Missouri Valley Conferences do not sponsor wrestling. Missouri and Northern Iowa participated only in the conference tournament in the 2012–13 school year, and began full conference play in 2013–14. Old Dominion did not begin MAC competition until 2013–14, when it left the Colonial Athletic Association (which had sponsored wrestling, but no longer does so) for Conference USA (which has never sponsored the sport). Old Dominion discontinued wrestling in April 2020.

On July 1, 2013, Florida Atlantic's men's soccer program moved with the rest of its athletic program to Conference USA, and Chicago State's men's tennis team followed the rest of its sports to the Western Athletic Conference.

The 2014–15 school year saw one affiliate member leave for another conference and two new affiliates join. The Hartwick men's soccer team left the MAC for the Sun Belt Conference, which had announced in February 2014 that it would reinstate men's soccer, a sport that it last sponsored in 1995, for the 2014 season. The new affiliates for 2014-15 were Binghamton in men's tennis and Longwood in field hockey.

On July 1, 2017, one associate member left the MAC, another associate member dropped one of its two MAC sports, and two new schools became associate members. Northern Iowa wrestling moved from the MAC to the Big 12 Conference. Missouri State dropped field hockey, but remained a MAC member in men's swimming & diving. Appalachian State joined MAC field hockey, and SIU Edwardsville (SIUE) joined in men's soccer. SIUE was initially announced as joining in both men's soccer and wrestling in 2018, but less than a week after the initial announcement, the conference indicated that SIUE men's soccer would immediately join. SIUE wrestling joined on its originally announced schedule.

On March 5, 2019, the conference announced that it would be adding the seven former members of the Eastern Wrestling League as affiliate members in wrestling, making the MAC the second-largest wrestling conference for academic year 2019–20.

With the addition of women's lacrosse, the MAC added affiliate members Detroit Mercy, Robert Morris, and Youngstown State in the 2020–21 academic year. UDM and YSU, all-sports members of the Horizon League, were announced as incoming associates at the same time the MAC announced the addition of lacrosse. RMU was announced as an incoming associate in late June 2020, shortly after the school announced it would join the Horizon League in July 2020.

In June 2020, SIUE announced that it would leave the MAC men's soccer league in 2021 to rejoin its previous men's soccer home of the Missouri Valley Conference. It remains in MAC wrestling to this day.

Also in 2021, Missouri left MAC wrestling and returned to its former home of the Big 12 Conference as a wrestling-only member. At the same time, four schools became single-sport MAC members-Bellarmine in field hockey, Georgia Southern and Georgia State in men's soccer, and Valparaiso in men's swimming (the school does not include diving in its men's aquatics program).

In 2022, West Virginia men's soccer was scheduled to leave the MAC for single-sport membership in Conference USA (CUSA). However, due to the tenuous future of CUSA at that time, West Virginia opted instead to join the Sun Belt Conference (SBC) in 2022 as that league reinstated men's soccer. Georgia Southern and Georgia State, both full SBC members, also returned men's soccer to their home conference in 2022. In response, the MAC announced that Chicago State would join as a men's soccer affiliate as of the 2022–23 season, as the Cougars prepared to depart the Western Athletic Conference in all sports, including soccer. Also in 2022, the MAC gained another affiliate when another Chicago institution, UIC, joined for men's swimming & diving. Ultimately, Chicago State's tenure as a MAC affiliate lasted only for the 2022 season, as the conference dropped men's soccer at season's end. 2023 saw UIC adding men's tennis to its affiliate membership, as well as the announcement that James Madison would be joining as an affiliate for field hockey in 2024.

In 2024, the Missouri Valley Conference announced it would begin sponsoring men's swimming & diving for the 2024–25 season. At the time, the MAC men's swimming programs consisted of 2 MAC schools and 5 affiliates from the MVC; correspondingly, all of these programs would move to the MVC for the following season, with the 2 MAC schools (Ball State and Miami) joining the MVC as affiliates for that sport. However, shortly after dropping men's swimming, the MAC announced it would begin sponsoring a new sport, women's rowing, in 2025–26. Accordingly, it brought on 3 new affiliates for that sport: Delaware, High Point, and former football affiliate Temple. Delaware will also join in field hockey in 2027–2028.

Institution	Location	Founded	Type	Enrollment	Nickname	Joined (Note: Represents the calendar year when fall sports competition begins.)	Colors	MAC sport(s)	Primary conference
Appalachian State University	Boone, North Carolina	1899	Public	19,089	Mountaineers	2017		Field hockey	Sun Belt
Bellarmine University	Louisville, Kentucky	1950	Catholic (Archdiocese of Louisville)	3,973	Knights	2021		Field hockey	ASUN
California State University, Sacramento	Sacramento, California	1947	Public	30,883	Hornets	2026		Football	Big West
California State University, Sacramento	Sacramento, California	1947	Public	30,883	Hornets	2026		Women's rowing	Big West
Commonwealth University-Bloomsburg	Bloomsburg, Pennsylvania	1839	Public	9,950	Huskies	2019		Men's wrestling	PSAC (Note: Currently an NCAA Division II athletic conference.)
Commonwealth University-Lock Haven	Lock Haven, Pennsylvania	1870	Public	4,607	Bald Eagles	2019		Men's wrestling	PSAC
University of Delaware	Newark, Delaware	1743	Public (Note: Delaware is officially chartered as a "privately-governed, state-assisted" institution. This status is broadly similar to that of New York State's statutory colleges, most of which are housed at Cornell University, or institutions in Pennsylvania's Commonwealth System of Higher Education.)	23,774	Blue Hens	2025		Women's rowing	CUSA
University of Delaware	Newark, Delaware	1743	Public	23,774	Blue Hens	2027		Field hockey	CUSA
University of Detroit Mercy	Detroit, Michigan	1877	Catholic (Jesuit & R.S.M.)	5,700	Titans	2020		Women's lacrosse	Horizon
Drake University	Des Moines, Iowa	1881	Private	4,774	Bulldogs	2026		Men's tennis	Missouri Valley
George Mason University	Fairfax, Virginia (Note: The main campus has a Fairfax mailing address but is in unincorporated Fairfax County, Virginia.)	1957	Public	35,047	Patriots	2019		Men's wrestling	Atlantic 10
High Point University	High Point, North Carolina	1924	United; Methodist	4,545	Panthers	2025		Women's rowing	Big South
James Madison University	Harrisonburg, Virginia	1908	Public	21,496	Dukes	2024		Field hockey	Sun Belt (American in 2027)
Longwood University	Farmville, Virginia	1839	Public	4,800	Lancers	2014		Field hockey	Big South
University of Nebraska Omaha	Omaha, Nebraska	1908	Public	15,058	Mavericks	2026		Men's tennis	Summit League
PennWest Clarion (Note: Clarion and Edinboro, previously separate institutions in the Pennsylvania State System of Higher Education formally named "Location University of Pennsylvania", became campuses of the new Pennsylvania Western University (PennWest) on July 1, 2022. Both continue to have their own athletic programs, branded solely with their location (as was the case before the PennWest merger).)	Clarion, Pennsylvania	1867	Public	5,225	Golden Eagles	2019		Men's wrestling	PSAC
PennWest Edinboro	Edinboro, Pennsylvania	1857	Public	4,834	Fighting Scots	2019		Men's wrestling	PSAC
Rider University	Lawrenceville, New Jersey	1865	Nonsectarian	5,400	Broncs	2019		Men's wrestling	Metro
Robert Morris University	Moon Township, Pennsylvania	1921	Nonsectarian	4,895	Colonials	2020		Women's lacrosse	Horizon
Southern Illinois University Edwardsville (Note: SIU Edwardsville (SIUE) competed in the MAC as an affiliate member for men's soccer from the 2017 to 2020 fall seasons (2017-18 to 2020-21 school years).)	Edwardsville, Illinois	1957	Public	14,142	Cougars	2018		Men's wrestling	OVC
Temple University (Note: Temple competed in the MAC as an affiliate member for football from the 2005 to 2011 fall seasons (2005-06 to 2011-12 school years).)	Philadelphia, Pennsylvania	1884	State-related	37,365	Owls	2025		Women's rowing	American
University of Illinois Chicago	Chicago, Illinois	1859	Public	34,199	Flames	2023		Men's tennis	Missouri Valley
Youngstown State University	Youngstown, Ohio	1908	Public	15,058	Penguins	2020		Women's lacrosse	Horizon

=== Former full members ===
School names, nicknames, and colors listed here reflect those used during each school's MAC tenure.

Institution	Location	Founded	Type	Nickname	Joined (Note: Represents the calendar year when fall sports competition begins.)	Left (Note: Represents the calendar year when spring sports competition ends.)	Colors	Current conference
Butler University	Indianapolis, Indiana	1855	Nonsectarian	Bulldogs	1946	1950		Big East (Note: For football, Butler competes in the Pioneer Football League (PFL).)
University of Cincinnati	Cincinnati, Ohio	1819	Public	Bearcats	1946	1953		Big 12
Marshall University	Huntington, West Virginia	1837	Public	Thundering Herd	1954	1969		Sun Belt
Marshall University	Huntington, West Virginia	1837	Public	Thundering Herd	1997	2005		Sun Belt
Northern Illinois University	DeKalb, Illinois	1895	Public	Huskies	1975	1986		Horizon League; Mountain West (Football)
Northern Illinois University	DeKalb, Illinois	1895	Public	Huskies	1997	2026		Horizon League; Mountain West (Football)
Wayne University (Note: Currently known as Wayne State University since 1956.)	Detroit, Michigan	1868	Public	Tartars (Note: Wayne State's athletic teams changed from Tartars to Warriors in 1999.)	1946	1947		GLIAC (Note: Currently an NCAA Division II athletic conference.)
Western Reserve University (Note: Western Reserve merged with Case Institute of Technology in 1967 to form Case Western Reserve University, with the athletic programs merging in 1971.)	Cleveland, Ohio	1826	Nonsectarian	Red Cats (Note: Western Reserve's teams were known as the Red Cats during their time in the MAC. With the athletic merger, Case Western Reserve abandoned the nicknames of both former institutions and adopted Spartans.)	1946	1955		UAA (Note: Currently an NCAA Division III athletic conference.)

=== Former affiliate members ===
School names, nicknames, and colors listed here reflect those used during each school's MAC tenure.

Institution	Location	Founded	Type	Nickname	Joined (Note: Represents the calendar year when fall sports competition begins.)	Left (Note: Represents the calendar year when spring sports competition ends.)	Colors	MAC sport(s)	Current primary conference	Current conference in former MAC sport(s)
Binghamton University (Note: Legally known as the State University of New York at Binghamton. The university actively discourages media use of the full name, or any formulation which includes "SUNY".)	Vestal, New York (Note: The campus is physically located in Vestal but has a Binghamton mailing address.)	1946	Public	Bearcats	2014	2023		Men's tennis	America East	NEC
University of Central Florida	Orlando, Florida (Note: The main campus has an Orlando mailing address but is entirely located in unincorporated Orange County.)	1963	Public	Golden; Knights (Note: Central Florida (UCF), known as the Golden Knights during its MAC tenure, dropped "Golden" from the athletic nickname in 2007 as part of its rebrand to the UCF Knights.)	2002	2005		Football	Big 12	
Chicago State University	Chicago, Illinois	1867	Public	Cougars	2007	2013		Men's tennis	NEC	
Chicago State University	Chicago, Illinois	1867	Public	Cougars	2022 (Note: On November 11, 2022, the MAC announced that it was suspending men's soccer as a conference sport effective at the end of the 2022 fall season (2022–23 school year).)	2023		Men's soccer	NEC	
Cleveland State University	Cleveland, Ohio	1964	Public	Vikings	2019	2025		Men's wrestling	Horizon	Dropped sport
University of Evansville	Evansville, Indiana	1854	United; Methodist	Purple Aces	2009	2024		Men's swimming (Note: Institution also has diving.)	MVC	
Florida Atlantic University	Boca Raton, Florida	1961	Public	Owls	2008	2013		Men's soccer	American	
Georgia Southern University	Statesboro, Georgia	1906	Public	Eagles	2021	2022		Men's soccer	Sun Belt	
Georgia State University	Atlanta, Georgia	1913	Public	Panthers	2021	2022		Men's soccer	Sun Belt	
Hartwick College (Note: In early 2014, the MAC made the decision "... to move forward without multi-divisional institutions." The conference then informed Hartwick that their contract as an affiliate member would not be renewed.)	Oneonta, New York	1797	Nonsectarian	Hawks	2007	2014		Men's soccer	Empire 8 (Note: Currently an NCAA Division III athletic conference.)	
Indiana University-Purdue University; Fort Wayne (Note: Currently known as Purdue University Fort Wayne since 2018.)	Fort Wayne, Indiana	1917	Public	Mastodons (Note: Indiana University-Purdue University Fort Wayne (IPFW), known as the IPFW Mastodons during their affiliation with the MAC for men's soccer and men's tennis, rebranded their athletic program as the Fort Wayne Mastodons in 2016. Following IPFW's split into two separate institutions in July 2018, the Fort Wayne athletic program transferred to the larger of the two new institutions, Purdue University Fort Wayne, and the athletic program rebranded again as the Purdue Fort Wayne Mastodons. The school colors changed to the old gold and black used by the other members of the Purdue system, most notably the main campus.)	2002	2007		Men's tennis	Horizon	
Indiana University-Purdue University; Fort Wayne	Fort Wayne, Indiana	1917	Public	Mastodons	2005	2007		Men's soccer	Horizon	
University of Kentucky	Lexington, Kentucky	1865	Public	Wildcats	1995	2005		Men's soccer	SEC	Sun Belt
University of Louisville	Louisville, Kentucky	1798	Public	Cardinals	1994	2005		Field hockey	ACC	
University of Massachusetts	Amherst, Massachusetts	1863	Public	Minutemen	2012	2016		Football	MAC	
University of Missouri	Columbia, Missouri	1839	Public	Tigers	2012	2021		Men's wrestling	SEC	Big 12
Missouri State University	Springfield, Missouri	1905	Public	Bears & Lady Bears	2005	2017		Field hockey	CUSA	Dropped sport
Missouri State University	Springfield, Missouri	1905	Public	Bears & Lady Bears	2009	2024		Men's swimming	CUSA	MVC
University of Northern Iowa	Cedar Falls, Iowa	1876	Public	Panthers	2012	2017		Men's wrestling	MVC	Big 12
Old Dominion University	Norfolk, Virginia	1930	Public	Monarchs	2013	2020		Men's wrestling	Sun Belt	Dropped sport
Southern Illinois University Carbondale	Carbondale, Illinois	1869	Public	Salukis	2009	2024		Men's swimming	MVC	
Southern Illinois University Edwardsville (Note: SIU Edwardsville (SIUE) remains in the MAC as an affiliate member for men's wrestling.)	Edwardsville, Illinois	1957	Public	Cougars	2017	2021		Men's soccer	OVC	
Temple University (Note: Temple returned to the MAC in 2025 as an affiliate member for women's rowing.)	Philadelphia, Pennsylvania	1884	State-related	Owls	2007	2012		Football	American	
University of Illinois Chicago	Chicago, Illinois	1859	Public	Flames	2022	2024		Men's swimming	MVC	
Valparaiso University	Valparaiso, Indiana	1859	Lutheran	Beacons	2021	2024		Men's swimming	MVC	
West Virginia University	Morgantown, West Virginia	1867	Public	Mountaineers	2012	2022		Men's soccer	Big 12	Sun Belt

=== Membership timeline ===
Full members Full members (non-football) Associate members (football only) Independent Other conference 1 Other conference 2

== Academics ==
One of the current full member schools, the University at Buffalo, is a member of the Association of American Universities (AAU). All members of the MAC are classified among "R2: Doctoral Universities – High research spending and doctorate production" except for the University at Buffalo, Kent State University, the University of Massachusetts Amherst, and Ohio University, which are classified among "R1: Doctoral Universities – Very high research spending and doctorate production". Member schools are also ranked nationally and globally by various groups, including U.S. News & World Report and Times Higher Education.

University	Location	Affiliation	Carnegie	Endowment	USN Nat.	URAP Global
University of Akron	Akron, Ohio	Public	Research (High)	$236,000,000	293–381	763
Ball State University	Muncie, Indiana	Public	Research (High)	$325,000,000	192	1,437
Bowling Green State University	Bowling Green, Ohio	Public	Research (High)	$200,000,000	246	1,443
University at Buffalo	Buffalo, New York	Public	Research (Very High)	$1,020,000,000	79	279
Central Michigan University	Mount Pleasant, Michigan	Public	Research (High)	$246,000,000	240	1,335
Eastern Michigan University	Ypsilanti, Michigan	Public	Research (High)	$78,000,000	293–381	2,187
Kent State University	Kent, Ohio	Public	Research (Very High)	$188,000,000	211	801
Miami University	Oxford, Ohio	Public	Research (High)	$736,000,000	91	1,061
Ohio University	Athens, Ohio	Public	Research (Very High)	$943,400,000	176	701
University of Toledo	Toledo, Ohio	Public	Research (Very High)	$551,000,000	293–381	745
Western Michigan University	Kalamazoo, Michigan	Public	Research (High)	$495,000,000	246	1,292

== Sports ==
The Mid-American Conference sponsors championship competition in 9 men's and 13 women's NCAA sanctioned sports, with women's lacrosse becoming the newest sport in 2020–21. As of the 2024–25 school year, 16 schools are associate members for four sports.

As the MAC is an FBS conference, its full members are subject to the NCAA requirement that FBS members field teams in at least 16 NCAA-recognized sports. However, as of 2017, the MAC itself required sponsorship of only four sports: football, men's and women's basketball, and women's volleyball. This may have since changed, as UMass was accepted as a new conference member effective in 2025 despite not sponsoring women's volleyball.

Teams in MAC competition
Sport	Men's	Women's
Baseball	11	–
Basketball	13	13
Cross country	9	12
Field hockey	–	8
Football	12	–
Golf	8	10
Gymnastics	–	7
Lacrosse	–	7
Soccer	–	12
Softball	–	12
Swimming and diving	–	8
Tennis	6	7
Track and field (indoor)	4	12
Track and field (outdoor)	5	12
Volleyball	–	12
Wrestling	13	–

=== Men's sponsored sports by school ===
School	Baseball	Basketball	Cross country	Football	Golf	Tennis	Track and field (indoor)	Track and field (outdoor)	Wrestling	Total MAC sports
Akron	Yes	Yes	Yes	Yes	No	No	Yes	Yes	No	6
Ball State	Yes	Yes	No	Yes	Yes	Yes	No	No	No	5
Bowling Green	Yes	Yes	Yes	Yes	Yes	No	No	No	No	5
Buffalo	No	Yes	Yes	Yes	No	Yes	Yes	Yes	Yes	7
Central Michigan	Yes	Yes	Yes	Yes	Yes	No	No	No	Yes	6
Eastern Michigan	Yes	Yes	Yes	Yes	Yes	No	Yes	Yes	No	7
Kent State	Yes	Yes	Yes	Yes	Yes	No	Yes	Yes	Yes	8
Miami (OH)	Yes	Yes	Yes	Yes	Yes	No	No	Yes	No	6
Ohio	Yes	Yes	Yes	Yes	Yes	No	No	No	Yes	6
Toledo	Yes	Yes	Yes	Yes	Yes	Yes	No	No	No	6
UMass	Yes	Yes	Yes	Yes	No	No	Yes	Yes	No	6
Western Michigan	Yes	Yes	No	Yes	No	Yes	No	No	No	4
Totals	11	12	10	12+1 (Note: Affiliate member Sacramento State.)	7	4+3 (Note: Affiliate members Drake, Omaha, and UIC.)	5	6	4+7 (Note: Affiliates Bloomsburg, Clarion, Edinboro, George Mason, Lock Haven, Rider, and SIUE.)	70+11

==== Men's varsity sports not sponsored by the MAC ====
School	Ice hockey	Lacrosse	Rifle (Note: Rifle is technically a men's sport, but men's, women's, and coed teams all compete against each other. Akron fields a coed team.)	Soccer	Swimming & diving	Volleyball
Akron	No	No	GARC	Big East	No	No
Ball State	No	No	No	No	MVC	MIVA
Bowling Green	CCHA	No	No	MVC	No	No
Miami	NCHC	No	No	No	MVC	No
UMass	Hockey East	A-10	No	Summit	MVC	No
Western Michigan	NCHC	No	No	MVC	No	No

=== Women's sponsored sports by school ===
School	Basketball	Cross country	Field hockey	Golf	Gymnastics	Lacrosse	Rowing	Soccer	Softball	Swimming	Tennis	Track and field (indoor)	Track and field (outdoor)	Volleyball	Total MAC sports
Akron	Yes	Yes	No	Yes	No	Yes	No	Yes	Yes	Yes	No	Yes	Yes	Yes	10
Ball State	Yes	Yes	Yes	Yes	Yes	No	No	Yes	Yes	Yes	Yes	Yes	Yes	Yes	12
Bowling Green	Yes	Yes	No	Yes	Yes	No	No	Yes	Yes	Yes	Yes	Yes	Yes	Yes	11
Buffalo	Yes	Yes	No	No	No	No	No	Yes	Yes	Yes	Yes	Yes	Yes	Yes	9
Central Michigan	Yes	Yes	Yes	Yes	Yes	Yes	No	Yes	Yes	No	No	Yes	Yes	Yes	11
Eastern Michigan	Yes	Yes	No	Yes	Yes	Yes	Yes	Yes	No	Yes	No	Yes	Yes	Yes	11
Kent State	Yes	Yes	Yes	Yes	Yes	Yes	No	Yes	Yes	No	No	Yes	Yes	Yes	11
Miami	Yes	Yes	Yes	No	No	No	No	Yes	Yes	Yes	Yes	Yes	Yes	Yes	10
Ohio	Yes	Yes	Yes	Yes	No	No	No	Yes	Yes	Yes	No	Yes	Yes	Yes	10
Toledo	Yes	Yes	No	Yes	No	No	Yes	Yes	Yes	Yes	Yes	Yes	Yes	Yes	11
UMass	Yes	Yes	Yes	No	No	Yes	Yes	Yes	Yes	Yes	Yes	Yes	Yes	No	11
Western Michigan	Yes	Yes	No	Yes	Yes	No	No	Yes	Yes	No	Yes	Yes	Yes	Yes	10
Totals	12	12	6+4 (Note: Affiliate members Appalachian State, Bellarmine, James Madison, and Longwood.)	9	6	5+3 (Note: Affiliate members Detroit Mercy, Robert Morris, and Youngstown State)	3+4 (Note: Affiliate members Delaware, High Point, Sacramento State, and Temple)	12	11	9	7	12	11	11	127+11

==== Women's varsity sports not sponsored by the MAC ====
School	Flag football (Note: Part of the NCAA Emerging Sports for Women program.)	Lightweight rowing (Note: Lightweight rowing is sanctioned by the Intercollegiate Rowing Association, not the NCAA.)	Rifle (Note: Rifle is technically a men's sport, but men's, women's, and coed teams all compete against each other. Akron fields a coed team.)	Synchronized skating (Note: Synchronized skating is sanctioned by U.S. Figure Skating, not by the NCAA. Most synchronized skating teams are clubs not affiliated with any college or university; Miami is one of about 15 schools that sponsor varsity or club teams.)	Wrestling
Akron	No	No	GARC	No	No
Eastern Michigan	No (Note: Eastern Michigan will add flag football in 2026–27.)	No (Note: Eastern Michigan will add women's lightweight rowing in 2026–27.)	No	No	No
Kent State	No	No	No	No	No (Note: Kent State will add women's wrestling in 2027–28.)
Miami	No	No	No	Independent	No

== Football ==
=== Scheduling ===
On November 30, 2023, the MAC approved a new scheduling format for football effective for the 2024 season, eliminating its East and West Divisions for the first time since 1996 in favor of a pod-based protected rivalry system. Under the new system, teams will be divided into 4 pods of 3 teams each, and each team will be guaranteed to face the other 2 teams in its pod every season. Additionally, every team in the MAC will be guaranteed to face every other team in the MAC at least once every three years. The MAC Football Championship Game, which previously matched the winner of the East Division against the winner of the West Division, will instead put the two teams in the MAC with the highest conference winning percentage. The pods are as follows:

MAC Pods
	School 1	School 2	School 3
Pod 1	Akron	Buffalo	Kent State
Pod 2	Ball State	Miami (OH)	Ohio
Pod 3	Bowling Green	Northern Illinois	Toledo
Pod 4	Central Michigan	Eastern Michigan	Western Michigan

=== All-time results ===
For the current season, see 2026 Mid-American Conference football season.

Team	First season	All-time record	All-time win %	Bowl appearances	Bowl record	MAC titles	Other conference titles	Stadium	Head coach
Akron	1891	534–602–36	.471	3	1–2	1	0	InfoCision Stadium – Summa Field	Joe Moorhead
Ball State	1924	479–461–32	.509	9	1–8	5	5	Scheumann Stadium	Mike Uremovich
Bowling Green	1919	570–432–52	.565	15	5–10	12	5	Doyt Perry Stadium	Eddie George
Buffalo	1894	415–561–28	.427	7*	4–3	1	1	Broadview Stadium	Pete Lembo
Central Michigan	1896	651–454–37	.586	13	4–9	7	9	Kelly/Shorts Stadium	Matt Drinkall
Eastern Michigan	1891	495–630–47	.442	8	2–6	1	9	Rynearson Stadium	Chris Creighton
Kent State	1920	365–608–28	.379	5	1–4	1	0	Dix Stadium	Mark Carney
UMass	1879	582–661–50	.469	0	0–0	0	22	Warren McGuirk Alumni Stadium	Joe Harasymiak
Miami (OH)	1888	743–489–44	.600	16	9–7	15	7	Yager Stadium	Chuck Martin
Ohio	1894	608–587–47	.508	16	8–8	5	6	Peden Stadium	John Hauser
Sacramento State	1954	330–414–8	.444	2	0–2	0	7	Hornet Stadium	Alonzo Carter
Toledo	1917	588–456–24	.562	22	12–10	12	3	Glass Bowl	Mike Jacobs
Western Michigan	1905	603–488–24	.552	12	2–10	3	1	Waldo Stadium	Lance Taylor

- - Buffalo was invited to Tangerine Bowl in 1958 but declined due to Florida's segregation laws at the time which would not have allowed Buffalo's two black players to participate.

=== MAC champions ===
Bowl games

As of 2026, the MAC is contracted to provide a team for each of four college football bowl games: the Arizona Bowl, Famous Idaho Potato Bowl, Puerto Rico Bowl, and Salute to Veterans Bowl. The MAC can also provide teams to different ESPN-owned bowls that have agreements with the Group of 5 conferences to choose two teams (but selections aren't locked in to certain conferences)

Name	Location	Opposing conference
68 Ventures Bowl	Mobile, Alabama	Sun Belt or CUSA (if a MAC team is chosen)
Arizona Bowl	Tucson, Arizona	Mountain West
Boca Raton Bowl	Boca Raton, Florida	Sun Belt, CUSA, Mountain West or American (if a MAC team is chosen)
Cure Bowl	Orlando, Florida	Sun Belt, CUSA, or American (if a MAC team is chosen)
Famous Idaho Potato Bowl	Boise, Idaho	Mountain West
Frisco Bowl	Frisco, Texas	Sun Belt, CUSA, Mountain West or American (if a MAC team is chosen)
New Mexico Bowl	Albuquerque, New Mexico	Mountain West (if a MAC team is chosen)
Myrtle Beach Bowl	Conway, South Carolina	Sun Belt or CUSA (if a MAC team is chosen)
Puerto Rico Bowl	Bayamón, Puerto Rico	Sun Belt, CUSA, Mountain West or American
Salute to Veterans Bowl	Montgomery, Alabama	Sun Belt

Notes

- The MAC champion (if not invited to the College Football Playoff or its associated bowls) is not contractually obligated to any specific bowl. The conference and the universities select which teams will play in which of the league's affiliated bowls.

=== College Football Playoff ===
The MAC champion, like the other "Group of 5" conferences received an automatic berth in one of the so-called New Year's Six bowl games associated with the College Football Playoff under either of the following circumstances:

- Selected as one of the top four teams overall by the CFP selection committee, in which case the team will play in a CFP national semifinal.
- Ranked by the committee as the top champion among the five conferences (American, C-USA, MAC, MW, Sun Belt) given access to one of the CFP bowls, in which case the team will play in the so-called "Access Bowl" as an at-large selection.

The first "Access Bowl" berth in 2014 went to Boise State (MW); the 2015 berth went to Houston (American). The MAC got its first berth in 2016 with Western Michigan, who had an undefeated regular season that year and finished ranked at No. 15 in the AP Poll.

During the era of the now-defunct Bowl Championship Series (BCS), one MAC team appeared in a BCS bowl game. In 2012, NIU qualified by being ranked in the top 16 (15th) in the season's final BCS standings, and also higher than at least one champion of a conference that received an automatic berth in a BCS game. In the 2012 season, two such conference champions were ranked below NIU: Big East champion Louisville, who was ranked 22nd, and Big Ten champion Wisconsin, who was unranked. NIU lost to Florida State in the Orange Bowl.

=== Rivalries ===
Football rivalries involving MAC teams include:

Teams		Rivalry name	Trophy	Meetings	First Played	Record	Series leader	Current streak
Akron	Kent State	–	Wagon Wheel	67	1923	37–28–2	Akron	Akron won 2
Akron	Youngstown State	–	Steel Tire	35	1982	19–14–2	Youngstown State	Youngstown State won 3
Ball State	Indiana State	–	Blue Key Victory Bell	64	1924	39–24–1	Ball State	Ball State won 1
Ball State	Miami	The Redbird Rivalry	Redbird Rivalry Trophy	38	1931	13–24–1	Miami	Miami won 5
Ball State	Northern Illinois	Battle for the Bronze Stalk	Bronze Stalk Trophy	53	1941	26–25–2	Northern Illinois	Northern Illinois won 1
Bowling Green	Kent State	–	Anniversary Award	92	1920	62–24–6	Bowling Green	Bowling Green won 2
Bowling Green	Toledo	Battle of I-75	Battle of I-75 Trophy	90	1919	43–42–4	Toledo	Bowling Green won 1
Buffalo	UMass	The Flagship Cup	–	16	1964	9–6	Buffalo	Buffalo won 2
Central Michigan	Eastern Michigan	Rivalry	–	102	1902	64–32–6	Central Michigan	Eastern Michigan won 1
Central Michigan	Western Michigan	Battle of the Cannon Trophy	Victory Cannon	97	1907	55–40–2	Western Michigan	Western Michigan won 2
Miami	Cincinnati	Battle for the Bell	Victory Bell	128	1888	61–60–7	Cincinnati	Cincinnati won 1
Miami	Ohio	Battle of the Bricks	–	101	1908	56–43–2	Miami	Ohio won 1
Miami	Northern Illinois	Battle for the Mallory Cup	Mallory Cup	21	1970	12-9	Miami	Miami won 4
Ohio	Marshall	Battle for the Bell	The Bell	60	1905	33–21–6	Ohio	Marshall won 1
UMass	Boston College	Rivalry	–	27	1899	23–4–1	Boston College	Boston College won 11
UMass	New Hampshire	Colonial Clash	–	74	1897	43–28–3	UMass	New Hampshire won 2
UMass	UConn	Rivalry	The Southwick Jug	78	1897	38–38–2	Tie	UConn won 3

In addition, Central Michigan, Eastern Michigan, and Western Michigan compete for the Michigan MAC Trophy, which is awarded to the team with the best head-to-head record each year. Since the inception of the trophy in 2005, Western Michigan has won 7 times, Central Michigan has won 5 times, and Eastern Michigan has won the trophy 4 times. Western Michigan has won the trophy three straight years (2018–2020) as well as six of seven years from 2014 to 2020 (2014–2016, 2018–2020).

== Basketball ==
In August 2010, Commissioner Jon Steinbrecher and the Cleveland Cavaliers announced that the Mid-American Conference men's and women's basketball tournaments would remain in Cleveland at the venue then known as Quicken Loans Arena and now as Rocket Arena through 2017. Both tournaments have flourished since moving to Cleveland in 2000, with the men's semi-finals and championship regularly drawing large crowds at Quicken Loans Arena. In 2007, the MAC also announced a format change for both tournaments, bringing all twelve men's and women's teams to Cleveland. The MAC also co-hosted the 2007 Women's Final Four at Quicken Loans Arena after successfully hosting the 2006 NCAA Women's Basketball Regional at the same facility.

On May 12, 2020, Steinbrecher announced a suite of major changes to the conference's competitive format across multiple sports in response to fallout from the COVID-19 pandemic. Specific to men's and women's basketball, the following changes took effect in 2020–21 and will continue through at least 2023–24:

- The conference adopted a single league table, eliminating the divisional standings.
- The conference schedule increased from 18 to 20 games.
- Only the top eight men's and women's teams advance to their respective conference tournaments.

== Championships ==
=== Current MAC champions ===
The following are the most recent conference champions of each MAC sport. Champions from the previous academic year are indicated with the calendar year of their title.

In sports in which regular-season and tournament champions are recognized, "RS" indicates regular-season champion and "T" indicates tournament champion.

Fall 2026

Sport	School
Football	()
Soccer (W)	Western Michigan (RS), (T)
Volleyball (W)	(), ()
Cross country (M)	Toledo
Cross country (W)	Toledo
Field hockey (W)	UMass (RS), ()

Winter 2026–27

Sport	School
Basketball (M)	(), ()
Basketball (W)	(),()
Indoor track and field (M)	
Indoor track and field (W)	
Swimming and diving (W)	
Gymnastics (W)	()
Wrestling (M)	(), ()

Spring 2027

Sport	School
Baseball	(),()
Softball	()
Outdoor track and field (M)	
Outdoor track and field (W)	
Golf (M)	
Golf (W)	
Tennis (M)	()()
Tennis (W)	(),()
Lacrosse	()
Rowing	

== Facilities ==
School	Football stadium	Capacity	Basketball arena	Capacity	Baseball stadium	Capacity
Akron	InfoCision Stadium-Summa Field	30,000	James A. Rhodes Arena	5,500	Skeeles Field	1,500
Ball State	Scheumann Stadium	22,500	John E. Worthen Arena	11,500	Shebek Stadium	1,700
Bowling Green	Doyt Perry Stadium	24,000	Stroh Center	4,700	Warren E. Steller Field	2,500
Buffalo	Broadview Stadium	25,013	Broadview Arena	6,100	Non-baseball school	
Central Michigan	Kelly/Shorts Stadium	35,127	McGuirk Arena	5,300	Bill Theunissen Stadium	2,046
Eastern Michigan	Rynearson Stadium	30,200	George Gervin GameAbove Center	8,800	Oestrike Stadium	2,500
Kent State	Dix Stadium	25,319	Memorial Athletic and Convocation Center	6,327	Schoonover Stadium	1,130
Miami	Yager Stadium	24,286	Millett Hall	6,400	Stanley G. McKie Field at Joseph P. Hayden Jr. Park	1,000
Ohio	Peden Stadium	24,000	Convocation Center	13,080	Bob Wren Stadium	4,000
Sacramento State	Hornet Stadium	21,195	Football-only member			
Toledo	Glass Bowl	26,038	Savage Arena	7,300	Scott Park Baseball Complex	1,000
Massachusetts	Warren McGuirk Alumni Stadium	17,000	Mullins Center	9,493	Earl Lorden Field	1,000
Western Michigan	Waldo Stadium	30,200	University Arena	5,421	Robert J. Bobb Stadium at Judson Hyames Field	1,500

== Financials ==
=== Conference distributions ===
The following table shows Mid American Athletic Conference distributions during the fiscal year beginning 07-01-2024 ending 06-30-2025 as reported by ProPublica using Schedule I of the Mid American Athletic Conference tax filing submitted on May 15, 2026.

Institution	2024–25 Distribution
Miami University	$3,218,889
University at Buffalo	$3,179,152
Bowling Green State University	$3,099,523
Western Michigan University	$3,087,423
Ohio University	$3,072,596
University of Toledo	$2,905,696
University of Akron	$2,770,223
Kent State University	$2,570,850
Ball State University	$2,516,533
Eastern Michigan University	$2,516,533
Central Michigan University	$2,489,374
Average for 11 Members	$2,881,134

=== Athletic department revenue by school ===
Total revenue includes ticket sales, contributions and donations, rights and licensing, student fees, school funds and all other sources including TV income, camp income, concessions, and novelties.

Total expenses includes coach and staff salaries, scholarships, buildings and grounds, maintenance, utilities and rental fees, recruiting, team travel, equipment and uniforms, conference dues, and insurance.

The following table shows institutional reporting to the U.S. Department of Education as shown on the DOE Equity in Athletics website for the 2023–24 academic year.

Institution	2023–24 total revenue from athletics	2023–24 total expenses on athletics
University of Massachusetts Amherst	$49,525,166	$49,525,166
University at Buffalo	$42,271,934	$42,113,971
Miami University	$40,819,194	$40,819,194
Western Michigan University	$40,487,398	$40,487,398
University of Toledo	$37,298,170	$37,298,170
Eastern Michigan University	$37,094,526	$37,094,526
Central Michigan University	$36,647,135	$36,647,135
Kent State University	$34,453,185	$34,453,185
Ohio University	$32,958,838	$32,958,838
Bowling Green State University	$32,044,229	$31,864,946
University of Akron	$30,010,416	$30,010,416
Ball State University	$29,737,219	$29,737,219

== Hall of Fame ==
The Mid-American Conference Hall of Fame was the first Division I conference Hall of Fame. It was established in 1987 and classes have been inducted in 1988, 1989, 1990, 1991, 1992, 1994, 2012 and 2013.

In order to be eligible, a person must have participated during the time the university was in the MAC and five years must have passed from the time the individual participated in athletics or worked in the athletic department.

The following is a list of the members of the MAC Hall of Fame, along with school affiliation, sport(s) for which they were inducted, and year of induction.

- Nick Saban, Kent State, football, 2024
- Harold Anderson, Bowling Green, basketball, 1991
- Janet Bachna, Kent State, gymnastics, 1992
- Joe Begala, Kent State, wrestling, 1991
- Tom Beutler, Toledo, football, 1994
- Kermit Blosser, Ohio, golf, 1988
- Jim Corrigall, Kent State, football, 1994
- Hasely Crawford, Eastern Michigan, track and field, 1991
- Ben Curtis, Kent State, golf, 2012
- Caroline (Mast) Daugherty, Ohio, basketball, 1994
- Herb Deromedi, Central Michigan, football, 2012
- Chuck Ealey, Toledo, football, 1988
- Fran Ebert, Western Michigan, softball / basketball, 1992
- Wayne Embry, Miami, basketball, 2012
- Karen Fitzpatrick, Ball State, field hockey, 2012
- John Gill, WMU athlete / coach / administrator, 1994
- Maurice Harvey, Ball State, football, 1992
- Bill Hess, Ohio, football coach, 1992
- Gary Hogeboom, Central Michigan, football, 1994
- Fred Jacoby, MAC commissioner, 1990
- Bob James, MAC commissioner, 1989
- Ron Johnson, Eastern Michigan, football, 1988
- Dave Keilitz, Central Michigan, baseball, 2013
- Ted Kjolhede, Central Michigan, basketball, 1988
- Kim Knuth, Toledo, women's basketball, 2013
- Ken Kramer, Ball State, football, 1991
- Bill Lajoie, Western Michigan, baseball, 1991
- Jack Lambert, Kent State, football, 1988
- Frank Lauterbur, Toledo, football, 1990
- Mel Long, Toledo, football, 1992
- Charlier Maher, Western Michigan, baseball, 1989
- Bill Mallory, Miami/Northern Illinois, football, 2013
- Brad Maynard, Ball State, football, 2013
- Ray McCallum, Ball State, basketball, 1988
- Jack McLain, MAC football official, 1992
- Karen Michalak, Central Michigan, basketball / track and field / field hockey, 1992
- Gordon Minty, Eastern Michigan, track and field, 1994
- Steve Mix, Toledo, basketball, 1989
- Thurman Munson, Kent State, baseball, 1990
- Ira Murchinson, Western Michigan, track and field, 1990
- Don Nehlen, Bowling Green, football, 1994
- Manny Newsome, Western Michigan, basketball, 1988
- Bob Nichols, Toledo, basketball, 2012
- John Offerdahl, Western Michigan, football, 2013
- Bob Owchinko, Eastern Michigan, baseball, 1992
- Ara Parseghian, Miami, football, 1988
- Doyt Perry, Bowling Green, football, 1988
- John Pont, Miami, football player / coach, 1992
- John Pruis, Ball State, president, 1994
- Trevor Rees, Kent State, football, 1989
- David Reese, MAC commissioner, 1988
- George Rider, Miami, track and field, 1989
- William Rohr, Miami, basketball coach 1994
- Dan Roundfield, Central Michigan, basketball, 1990
- Bo Schembechler, Miami, football coach, 1991
- Mike Schmidt, Ohio, baseball, 2012
- Dick Shrider, Miami, basketball, 1990
- Christi Smith, Akron, track and field, 2013
- Jim Snyder, Ohio, basketball, 1991
- Shafer Suggs, Ball State, football, 1989
- Nate Thurmond, Bowling Green, basketball, 1989
- Gary Trent, Ohio, men's basketball, 2013
- Phil Villapiano, Bowling Green, football, 1992
- Bob Welch, Eastern Michigan, baseball, 1990
- Dave Wottle, Bowling Green, track and field, 1990
- Bob Wren, Ohio, baseball, 1989

== Media ==
=== Broadcasts ===
A number of MAC sports, including football, men's and women's basketball, baseball, soccer, wrestling and volleyball, are telecast on Spectrum Sports, replacing SportsTime Ohio and Fox Sports Ohio as the MAC TV partner. Along with Spectrum Sports, ESPN, as well as the American Sports Network, retain the "local and regional" syndication telecast rights to the MAC for football and basketball.

In 2000, ESPN began broadcasting MAC football games on Tuesday and Wednesday nights. The conference agreed to the unusual windows to help improve viewership, as the games would face less competition than games in traditional windows such as on Saturdays); fans would nickname the midweek games MACtion. In 2014, the conference and ESPN agreed to a new 13-year contract, where each school receives more than $800,000 annually, and plays most November football games on weekday nights; 16 of 18 games in 2016 were not on Saturdays, for example. While these mid-week games have a decreased stadium attendance, they benefit from prominent, national television coverage on an ESPN network, as opposed to having to air on lesser-viewed channels or streaming platforms. While noting the smaller attendance, coaches say that midweek games are good for the conference, and give players a break on Saturdays.

Ball State produces its own comprehensive television package with Ball State Sports Link. Affiliate stations include WIPB in Muncie, WNDY in Indianapolis, WPTA in Fort Wayne, WHME in South Bend, WTVW in Evansville, WYIN in Merrillville and Comcast in Michigan. All Ball State Sports Link games are also broadcast on student radio station WCRD and on the Ball State Radio Network produced by WLBC-FM and Backyard Broadcasting.

NIU has multiple football and basketball games telecast by Comcast SportsNet Chicago. In addition, most NIU football and basketball games can be heard on WSCR-AM 670 "The Score"—Chicago's 50,000-watt all-sports station, which reaches 38 states and Canada.

=== MAC Properties ===
MAC Properties (a division of ISP Sports) is the sponsorship arm of the Mid-American Conference, and handles all forms of sponsorship and advertising for the MAC which includes managing and growing its stable of official corporate partners. As of 2010, the MAC has five official corporate partners: FirstEnergy, Marathon, PNC Bank, AutoTrader.com and Cleveland Clinic Sports Health. There are approximately 20 other companies engaged as sponsors of the conference at the non-official level. MAC Properties also assists with the management of the conference's television and radio contracts, including those with ESPN Regional, FOX Sports Ohio and ESPN 850 WKNR among others.
