= Puerto Rico Bowl =

- Sanders Grossman Law Puerto Rico Bowl
- Stadium: Juan Ramón Loubriel Stadium
- Location: Bayamón, Puerto Rico
- Operated: 2026–future
- Conference tie-ins: Mid-American Conference

Sponsors
- Sanders Grossman Law (2026–present)

2026 matchup
- (December 22, 2026)

The Puerto Rico Bowl is a planned NCAA Division I Football Bowl Subdivision college football bowl game to be played in Bayamón, Puerto Rico, at Juan Ramón Loubriel Stadium on December 22, 2026. The bowl has a tie-in with the Mid-American Conference.

Sponsored by law firm Sanders Grossman Law, the game will be officially known as the Sanders Grossman Law Puerto Rico Bowl beginning with its inaugural 2026 edition.

== History ==
On May 8, 2026, the NCAA announced that Puerto Rico was approved for a bowl game. The game will be managed by Complete Sports Management and ESPN Events in collaboration with Discover Puerto Rico. The bowl is slated to be held following the 2026 FBS regular season, in December.

== See also ==
- List of college bowl games
