= List of NCAA Division I conference changes in the 2020s =

National Collegiate Athletic Association logo

Since 2020 many college or university athletic programs have changed membership from one National Collegiate Athletic Association athletic conference to another.

== Announced future changes ==
Notes

- The "year" column indicates the calendar year in which the conference change will take place, which in the case of spring sports will differ from the year in which competition will begin.

School	Sport(s)	Former conference	New conference	Year
Air Force Falcons	Men's water polo	WCC	Big West	2027
Chicago State Cougars	Football	FCS Independent	NEC	2027
Columbia Lions	Women's wrestling	No team	Independent	2027
Delaware Fightin' Blue Hens	Field hockey	MPSF	MAC	2027
Denver Pioneers	Men's and women's swimming & diving	MPSF	WCC	2027
Fairfield Stags	Full membership	Metro	CAA	2027
Fresno State Bulldogs	Women's water polo	GCC	Big West	2027
Grand Canyon Antelopes	Beach volleyball	MPSF	Big West	2027
Indiana Hoosiers	Women's water polo	MPSF	CWPA	2027
Iowa State Cyclones	Women's wrestling	No team	Independent	2027
James Madison Dukes	Full membership	SBC	American	2027
Kent State Golden Flashes	Women's wrestling	No team	Independent	2027
Le Moyne Dolphins	Full membership	NEC	Metro	2027
Loyola (LA) Wolf Pack (Note: Loyola (LA) plans to begin a transition from the NAIA to NCAA Division II in 2027–28, and to align fully with the NCAA in 2028–29. Beach volleyball has a single national championship event open to members of all NCAA divisions.)	Beach volleyball	Independent (NAIA)	Independent (NCAA D-II)	2027
Maryville (MO) Saints	Men's ice hockey	Club team	TBA	2027
McMurry War Hawks (Note: McMurry is an NCAA Division III member; the NCAA championship meets in men's and women's gymnastics are open to members of all NCAA division.)	Men's and women's gymnastics	No teams	TBA	2027
Monroe Mustangs (Note: Monroe starts a transition from the NJCAA to NCAA Division II no later than 2027–28, and aims to align fully with the NCAA in 2028–29. The NCAA's top-level men's volleyball championship is open to members of Divisions I and II. The transition applies to Monroe's New Rochelle campus only; athletics at the Bronx campus will continue to compete in the NJCAA.)	Men's volleyball	Independent (NJCAA)	TBA (Division II)	2027
Morgan State Bears	Men's golf	No team	NEC	2027
Morgan State Lady Bears	Women's golf	No team	MEAC	2027 (Note: At the time Morgan State announced the addition of men's and women's golf, all MEAC members that sponsored golf (whether men's or women's) were NEC associates. In June 2026, the MEAC announced it would start sponsoring women's golf in 2026–27.)
Pacific Tigers	Men's and women's swimming & diving	MPSF	WCC	2027
Pepperdine Waves	Women's swimming & diving	MPSF	WCC	2027
Saint Anselm Hawks (Note: At the time of announcement, Saint Anselm was an NCAA Division II member. The NCAA's top-level women's ice hockey championship is open to members of Divisions I and II.)	Women's ice hockey	NEWHA	NEWMAC (NCAA D-III)	2027
Saint Mary's Gaels	Men's and women's swimming & diving	MPSF	WCC	2027
Salem Tigers (Note: At the time of announcement, Salem is an NCAA Division II member. The NCAA water polo championships for both men and women are open to members of all three NCAA divisions.)	Men's and women's water polo	WWPA	TBA (Note: Salem's NAIA destination, the River States Conference, does not sponsor water polo.)	2027
San Diego Toreros	Women's swimming & diving	MPSF	WCC	2027
San Diego State Aztecs	Women's water polo	GCC	Big West	2027
San Jose State Spartans	Beach volleyball	MPSF	Big West	2027
San Jose State Spartans	Men's water polo	WCC	Big West	2027
San Jose State Spartans	Women's water polo	MPSF	Big West	2027
Seattle Redhawks	Men's and women's swimming & diving	MPSF	WCC	2027
SMU Mustangs	Men's lacrosse	No team	ACC	2027
Stonehill Skyhawks	Full membership	NEC	Metro	2027
Stonehill Skyhawks	Men's golf	No team	Metro	2027
Texas A&M–Texarkana Eagles (Note: Texas A&M–Texarkana plans to begin a transition from the NAIA to NCAA Division II no later than 2027–28, and to align fully with the NCAA in 2028–29. Beach volleyball has a single national championship event open to members of all NCAA divisions.)	Beach volleyball	Independent (NAIA)	Independent (NCAA D-II)	2027
Texas State Bobcats	Women's gymnastics	No team	Pac-12	2027
UC San Diego Tritons	Full membership	Big West	WCC	2027
UC San Diego Tritons	Men's soccer	Pac-12	WCC	2027
UC San Diego Tritons	Men's and women's swimming & diving	MPSF	WCC	2027
UC Santa Barbara Gauchos	Full membership	Big West	WCC	2027
UC Santa Barbara Gauchos	Men's and women's swimming & diving	MPSF	WCC	2027
Longwood Lancers	Women's volleyball	No team	Big South	2028
Murray State Racers	Beach volleyball	No team	TBA	TBA
Murray State Racers	Bowling	No team	TBA	TBA
Murray State Racers	Women's rowing	No team	TBA	TBA
Murray State Racers	Stunt	No team	TBA	TBA
Murray State Racers	Men's tennis	No team	TBA	TBA
Tennessee State Tigers and Lady Tigers	Baseball, women's soccer	No teams	OVC	TBA
Tennessee State Tigers	Men's ice hockey	Club team	TBA	TBA (Note: Tennessee State initially announced it would start varsity men's ice hockey play in 2025–26, later delaying it until 2026–27. The school later canceled its planned 2026–27 season, reportedly due to severe fundraising shortfalls.)
Tennessee State Lady Tigers	Women's ice hockey	Club team	TBA	TBA
Tennessee State Lady Tigers	Women's swimming & diving	No team	TBA	TBA

=== Division II women's bowling (2027) ===
On January 16, 2026, the Division II membership approved the establishment of a bowling championship for that division. Currently, the NCAA bowling championship, sanctioned for women only, uses a "National Collegiate" format, with members of all three divisions competing for a single championship. The first D-II bowling championship will be held in spring 2028; under NCAA rules, once a division-specific championship is created for a sport that uses the National Collegiate format, two National Collegiate championships must be held before the division championship can start.

Unless otherwise noted, the following programs, all of which will compete at the National Collegiate level in 2026–27, will start competing for the new Division II championship in 2027–28, assuming that their parent institutions do not close, drop varsity bowling, or leave Division II. Conference affiliations reflect those for bowling.

Sponsorship information is taken from the official NCAA membership directory, which is searchable by division and sport. The list of NCAA women's bowling programs also contains references to future programs.

School	Current conference
Adelphi Panthers	ECC
Barton Bulldogs	Carolinas
Belmont Abbey Crusaders	Carolinas
Bowie State Bulldogs	CIAA
Caldwell Cougars	CACC
Central Missouri Jennies	GLVC
Chestnut Hill Griffins	CACC
Daemen Wildcats	ECC
Dominican (NY) Chargers	CACC
D'Youville Saints	ECC
Elizabeth City State Vikings	CIAA
Emmanuel (GA) Lions	Carolinas
Fayetteville State Lady Broncos	CIAA
Felician Golden Falcons	CACC
Holy Family Tigers	CACC
Indianapolis Greyhounds	GLVC
Johnson C. Smith Golden Bulls	CIAA
Kutztown Golden Bears	ECC
Lewis Flyers	GLVC
Livingstone Blue Bears	CIAA
Maryville (MO) Saints	GLVC
McKendree Bearcats	GLVC
Molloy Lions	ECC
Newman Jets	GLVC
Oklahoma Christian Lady Eagles	GLVC
Quincy Hawks	GLVC
Roberts Wesleyan Redhawks	ECC
Saint Anselm Hawks (Note: Saint Anselm has announced that it will start a transition to Division III in 2027–28 and join the New England Women's and Men's Athletic Conference.)	ECC (Note: Saint Anselm's bowling affiliation beyond 2026–27 is yet to be determined. Barring any other changes in membership or bowling sponsorship, it will be the only NEWMAC member with a bowling program.)
St. Thomas Aquinas Spartans	ECC
Shaw Bears	CIAA
Shawnee State Bears (Note: Starts NCAA competition in 2026–27 after having competed in the NAIA.)	TBA
Thomas More Saints	Carolinas (Note: This school is a full member of the Great Midwest Athletic Conference, which holds a joint bowling championship with Conference Carolinas. The NCAA considers all G-MAC schools in this alliance to be CC affiliates.)
Ursuline Arrows	Carolinas
Virginia State Trojans	CIAA
Virginia Union Panthers	CIAA
Walsh Cavaliers	Carolinas
Wilmington Wildcats	CACC

=== Division III women's wrestling (2027) ===
Also on January 16, 2026, the Division III membership approved the establishment of a women's wrestling championship for that division. The NCAA women's wrestling championship, introduced in 2025–26, also uses the "National Collegiate" format. The first D-III women's wrestling championship will also be held in spring 2028.

The following programs, all either already competing at the National Collegiate level or planning to do so starting in 2026–27, will start competing for the new Division III championship in 2027–28, assuming that their parent institutions do not close, drop varsity women's wrestling, or leave Division III. Conference affiliations reflect those for women's wrestling.

Sponsorship information is taken from the official NCAA membership directory, which is searchable by division and sport. The list of NCAA women's wrestling programs also contains references to future programs.

School	Current conference
Adrian Bulldogs	Independent
Albion Britons	Independent
Alfred State Pioneers	AMCC
Alma Scots	Independent
Alvernia Golden Wolves	Middle Atlantic
Arcadia Knights	Middle Atlantic
Augsburg Auggies	Independent
Augustana (IL) Vikings	CCIW
Aurora Spartans	CCIW
Baldwin Wallace Yellow Jackets	Independent
Bethany (WV) Bison	Independent
Buena Vista Beavers	A-R-C
Buffalo State Bengals	AMCC
Carthage Firebirds	CCIW
Cedar Crest Falcons	Independent
Centenary (NJ) Cyclones	Independent
Central (IA) Dutch	A-R-C
Chatham Cougars (Note: Starts varsity competition in 2026–27.)	TBA
Coe Kohawks	A-R-C
Cornell (IA) Rams	Independent
Delaware Valley Aggies	Middle Atlantic
Dubuque Spartans	A-R-C
Eastern Eagles	Middle Atlantic
Elmhurst Blue Jays	CCIW
Elmira Soaring Eagles	AMCC
Eureka Red Devils	SLIAC
Gettysburg Bullets	TBA
Greensboro Pride	Independent
Heidelberg Student Princes	Independent
Hiram Terriers	AMCC
Huntingdon Hawks	SLIAC
Illinois Wesleyan Titans	CCIW
Ithaca Bombers	Independent
John Carroll Blue Streaks	AMCC
Kean Cougars	Independent
Keystone Giants	TBA
Lakeland Muskies	Independent
Linfield Wildcats	Independent
Loras Duhawks	A-R-C
Luther Norse	A-R-C
Lyon Scots	SLIAC
Maine Maritime Mariners	Independent
Manchester Spartans	Independent
Marymount Saints	Independent
McDaniel Green Terror	Independent
McMurry War Hawks	SLIAC
Millikin Big Blue	CCIW
Misericordia Cougars	Middle Atlantic
Mount St. Joseph Lions	TBA
Mount Union Purple Raiders	Independent
MSOE Raiders	CCIW
Muhlenberg Mules	Independent
New England Pilgrims	NEWA
North Central (IL) Cardinals	CCIW
Norwich Cadets	NEWA
Otterbein Cardinals	Independent
Pacific (OR) Boxers	Independent
Penn State Altoona Lions	AMCC
Randolph WildCats	Independent
Schreiner Mountaineers	SLIAC
Simpson Storm	A-R-C
Southern Virginia Knights	Independent
Trine Thunder	Independent
Ursinus Bears	Independent
Utica Pioneers	Independent
Wartburg Knights	A-R-C
Waynesburg Yellow Jackets	Independent
Western New England Golden Bears	Independent
Westminster (MO) Blue Jays	SLIAC
Wilkes Colonials	Independent
Wisconsin–Oshkosh Titans	Independent
Wisconsin–Stevens Point Pointers	Independent
Wittenberg Tigers	TBA
York (PA) Spartans	Middle Atlantic

== History ==
=== 2026–2027 ===
School	Sport(s)	Former conference	New conference
Air Force Falcons	Men's soccer	WAC	Mountain West
Air Force Falcons	Men's swimming & diving	MPSF	Mountain West
Air Force Falcons	Men's wrestling	Big 12	Pac-12
Austin Peay Governors	Full membership	ASUN	UAC (Note: The Western Athletic Conference rebranded as the United Athletic Conference in July 2026.)
Boise State Broncos	Full membership	Mountain West	Pac-12
Boise State Broncos	Men's and women's indoor track & field	Mountain West	MPSF
Cal State Bakersfield Roadrunners	Men's and women's swimming & diving	Big West	MPSF
California Baptist Lancers	Full membership	WAC	Big West
California Baptist Lancers	Men's soccer	WAC	Pac-12 (Note: By agreement between the Big West and Pac-12 Conferences, four Big West teams are playing as Pac-12 men's soccer affiliates in 2026.)
California Baptist Lancers	Women's swimming & diving	MPSF	Big West
California Baptist Lancers	Men's swimming & diving	MPSF	Dropped men's swimming & diving
California Baptist Lancers	Men's golf	WAC	Dropped men's golf
California Baptist Lancers	Men's wrestling	Big 12	Dropped men's wrestling
Central Arkansas Bears and Sugar Bears	Full membership	ASUN	UAC
Colorado State Rams	Full membership	Mountain West	Pac-12
Colorado State Rams	Men's and women's indoor track & field	Mountain West	MPSF
Charleston Southern Buccaneers	Football	OVC–Big South	OVC (Note: The Ohio Valley Conference and Big South Conference agreed to dissolve their football alliance, with the alliance being reincorporated into the OVC. The two Big South members that participated in the alliance became OVC football affiliates.)
Chicago State Cougars	Football	No team	FCS Independent
Dallas Baptist Patriots (Note: Dallas Baptist is a Division II member that plays Division I baseball.)	Baseball	CUSA	Pac-12
Delaware State Hornets	Women's golf	NEC	MEAC
Denver Pioneers	Full membership	Summit	WCC
Denver Pioneers	Men's and women's swimming & diving	Summit	MPSF
Drake Bulldogs	Men's tennis	Summit	MAC
Eastern Illinois Panthers	Football	OVC–Big South	OVC
Eastern Kentucky Colonels	Full membership	ASUN	UAC
Fairfield Stags	Field hockey	NEC	CAA
Fresno State Bulldogs	Full membership	Mountain West	Pac-12
Gardner–Webb Runnin' Bulldogs	Football	OVC–Big South	OVC
Gonzaga Bulldogs	Full membership	WCC	Pac-12
Grand Canyon Antelopes	Men's soccer	WAC	Mountain West
Grand Canyon Antelopes	Men's swimming & diving	Big West	Mountain West
Greenville Panthers (Note: Greenville is an NCAA Division III member. The NCAA women's gymnastics championship is open to members of all three NCAA divisions.)	Women's gymnastics	Independent	WIAC (Note: The WIAC is a Division III conference that sponsors women's gymnastics as a de facto Division I sport.)
Hawaiʻi Rainbow Warriors and Rainbow Wahine	Full membership	Big West	Mountain West (Note: Before becoming a full Mountain West member, Hawaiʻi had been a football-only member of the conference since 2012.)
Howard Bison	Women's golf	NEC	MEAC
Illinois State Redbirds	Men's tennis	MVC	Dropped men's tennis
Iona Gaels	Men's and women's tennis	No teams	Metro
Le Moyne Dolphins	Bowling	No team	NEC
LeMoyne–Owen Magicians (Note: LeMoyne–Owen and Thomas More are NCAA Division II members; the NCAA's top-level men's volleyball championship is open to members of Divisions I and II.)	Men's volleyball	SIAC	Dropped men's volleyball
Liberty Flames	Men's soccer	OVC	SoCon
Lindenwood Lions	Football	OVC–Big South	OVC
Little Rock Trojans	Full membership	OVC	UAC
Little Rock Trojans	Women's swimming & diving	MVC	ASUN
Louisiana Tech Bulldogs and Lady Techsters	Full membership	CUSA	Sun Belt
Marshall Thundering Herd	Stunt	No team	Independent (Note: Marshall initially announced that it would drop women's swimming & diving at the same time it would add stunt, but later decided to maintain swimming & diving without interruption.)
Maryland Eastern Shore Hawks	Women's golf	NEC	MEAC
Mercy Mavericks (Note: Mercy is an NCAA Division II member; the NCAA's top-level men's volleyball championship is open to members of Divisions I and II.)	Men's volleyball	No team	ECC (NCAA D-II) (Note: With men's volleyball having a combined national championship for Divisions I and II, the East Coast Conference is a de facto Division I conference in that sport.)
Mercyhurst Lakers	Men's ice hockey	AHA	Dropped men's ice hockey
Mercyhurst Lakers	Women's wrestling	No team	Independent
Merrimack Warriors	Men's volleyball	Independent	NEC
North Alabama Lions	Full membership	ASUN	UAC
North Alabama Lions	Men's and women's indoor track & field	No teams	UAC (Note: North Alabama's track & field programs were initially distance-based, expanding on its existing men's and women's cross country teams.)
North Alabama Lions	Men's and women's outdoor track & field	No teams	UAC
North Carolina Central Eagles	Women's golf	NEC	MEAC
North Dakota Fighting Hawks	Men's and women's tennis	Summit	Dropped tennis
North Dakota State Bison	Football	MVFC	Mountain West
North Dakota State Bison	Men's wrestling	Big 12	Pac-12
Northern Colorado Bears	Men's wrestling	Big 12	Pac-12
Northern Illinois Huskies	Full membership	MAC	Horizon
Northern Illinois Huskies	Football	MAC	Mountain West
Northern Illinois Huskies	Women's gymnastics	MAC	Mountain West
Northern Illinois Huskies	Men's wrestling	MAC	Pac-12
Omaha Mavericks	Men's tennis	Summit	MAC
Oral Roberts Golden Eagles	Men's tennis	Summit	Horizon
Pacific Tigers	Men's volleyball	No team	MPSF
Queens (NC) Royals	Field hockey	Independent	MPSF
Quinnipiac Bobcats	Field hockey	Big East	NEC
Rice Owls	Women's golf	No team	American
Sacramento State Hornets	Full membership	Big Sky	Big West
Sacramento State Hornets	Football	Big Sky	MAC
Sacramento State Hornets	Men's and women's indoor track & field	Big Sky	MPSF
Sacramento State Hornets	Women's rowing	WCC	MAC
Sacred Heart Pioneers	Football	FCS Independent	CAA Football
St. Bonaventure Bonnies	Women's golf	No team	A-10
Saint Francis Red Wolves (Note: When Saint Francis announced its move to D-III, its nickname was Red Flash. The nickname was changed to Red Wolves effective in 2026–27.)	Full membership	NEC	PAC (NCAA D-III)
Saint Louis Billikens	Men's and women's tennis	A-10	Dropped tennis
Saint Mary's Gaels	Men's and women's swimming & diving	No teams	MPSF
Saint Mary's Gaels	Men's water polo	No team	WCC
Saint Mary's Gaels	Women's water polo	No team	GCC
Saint Peter's Peacocks	Women's golf	No team	Metro
St. Thomas Tommies	Men's ice hockey	CCHA	NCHC
San Diego Toreros	Beach volleyball	No team	WCC
San Diego Toreros	Women's swimming & diving	Big West	MPSF
San Diego State Aztecs	Full membership	Mountain West	Pac-12
San Diego State Aztecs	Women's indoor track & field	Mountain West	MPSF
San Jose State Spartans	Men's soccer	WAC	Mountain West
San Jose State Spartans	Women's water polo	MPSF	GCC
Seattle Redhawks	Men's and women's swimming & diving	Big West	MPSF
South Dakota State Jackrabbits	Men's wrestling	Big 12	Pac-12
Southeast Missouri Redhawks	Football	OVC–Big South	OVC
Southern Utah Thunderbirds	Full membership	WAC	Big Sky
Southern Utah Thunderbirds	Women's gymnastics	MPSF	Pac-12
Stetson Hatters	Men's and women's outdoor track & field (Note: Stetson's outdoor track & field program was initially distance-based, building on the school's existing cross country programs.)	No teams	ASUN
Stonehill Skyhawks	Men's swimming & diving	No team	NEC
Tennessee State Tigers	Football	OVC–Big South	OVC
Tennessee Tech Golden Eagles	Full membership	OVC	SoCon
Tennessee Tech Golden Eagles	Football	OVC–Big South	SoCon
Tennessee Tech Golden Eagles	Men's tennis	Horizon	SoCon
Texas State Bobcats	Full membership	Sun Belt	Pac-12
Thomas More Saints	Men's volleyball	GLVC (NCAA D-II) (Note: With men's volleyball having a combined national championship for Divisions I and II, the Great Lakes Valley Conference is a de facto Division I conference in that sport.)	Dropped men's volleyball
Tulsa Golden Hurricane	Men's golf	No team	American
UC Davis Aggies	Full membership	Big West	Mountain West (Note: UC Davis football remains in FCS as a football-only member of the Big Sky.)
UC Davis Aggies	Beach volleyball, men's water polo	Big West	WCC
UC Davis Aggies	Women's water polo	Big West	GCC
UC Riverside Highlanders	Men's soccer	Big West	Pac-12
UC San Diego Tritons	Women's rowing	CAA	WCC
UC San Diego Tritons	Men's soccer	Big West	Pac-12
UC San Diego Tritons	Men's and women's swimming & diving	Big West	MPSF
UC Santa Barbara Gauchos	Women's indoor track & field	Independent	MPSF
UC Santa Barbara Gauchos	Men's and women's swimming & diving	Big West	MPSF
UNLV Rebels	Men's soccer	WAC	Mountain West
UNLV Rebels	Men's swimming & diving	MPSF	Mountain West
UT Martin Skyhawks	Football	OVC–Big South	OVC
Utah State Aggies	Full membership	Mountain West	Pac-12
Utah State Aggies	Men's and women's indoor track & field	Mountain West	MPSF
Utah Tech Trailblazers	Full membership	WAC	Big Sky
Utah Tech Trailblazers	Baseball, men's soccer	WAC	Mountain West
Utah Tech Trailblazers	Men's indoor and outdoor track & field	No teams	Big Sky (Note: Utah Tech's new men's track & field program initially competed only in distance running events, building on the school's existing cross country program.)
Utah Valley Wolverines	Full membership	WAC	Big West
Utah Valley Wolverines	Men's and women's indoor track & field	WAC	MPSF
UTEP Miners	Full membership	CUSA	Mountain West
UT Rio Grande Valley Vaqueros	Men's soccer	Independent	OVC
Villanova Wildcats	Football	CAA Football	Patriot
West Florida Argonauts	Full membership	GSC (NCAA D-II)	ASUN
West Florida Argonauts	Football	GSC (NCAA D-II)	UAC
West Georgia Wolves	Full membership	ASUN	UAC
Western Illinois Leathernecks	Football	OVC–Big South	OVC
Wichita State Shockers	Men's and women's golf	American	Dropped golf
William & Mary Tribe	Football	CAA Football	Patriot
Wyoming Cowboys	Men's swimming & diving	MPSF	Mountain West

=== 2025–2026 ===
School	Sport(s)	Former conference	New conference
Air Force Falcons	Men's swimming & diving	WAC	MPSF
Albany Great Danes	Women's rowing	Independent	CAA
American International Yellow Jackets	Men's ice hockey	Atlantic Hockey America	NE-10 (NCAA D-II) (Note: The NCAA does not sponsor a Division II championship in men's ice hockey. The Northeast-10 Conference, in which American International is a full member, operates a men's ice hockey league under Division II regulations, and does not participate in the Division I championship.)
Augusta Jaguars (Note: Augusta is a Division II member that competes in Division I men's and women's golf.)	Men's and women's golf	Southland	WCC
Austin Peay Governors	Women's lacrosse	No team	ASUN
Boise State Broncos	Beach volleyball	Southland	Big 12
Bryant Bulldogs	Women's rowing	Independent	CAA
Bryant Bulldogs	Men's tennis	Southland	Big South
Cal Poly Mustangs	Men's and women's swimming & diving	Big West	Dropped swimming & diving
Cal Poly Mustangs	Stunt (Note: At the time, stunt did not have an NCAA-sanctioned championship, but was part of the NCAA Emerging Sports for Women program. Stunt graduated from the Emerging Sports program in January 2026, with the first official NCAA championship to be held in 2026–27.)	Club team	Independent
California Baptist Lancers	Men's and women's swimming & diving	WAC	MPSF
Canisius Golden Griffins	Acrobatics & tumbling (Note: At the time, acrobatics & tumbling did not have an NCAA-sanctioned championship, but was part of the NCAA Emerging Sports for Women program. The sport graduated from the Emerging Sports program in January 2026, with the first official NCAA championship to be held in 2026–27.)	No team	Independent
Central Arkansas Sugar Bears	Women's tennis	ASUN	Dropped women's tennis
Chicago State Cougars	Men's and women's tennis	Horizon	NEC
Cleveland State Vikings	Women's golf, softball	Horizon	Dropped both sports
Cleveland State Vikings	Men's wrestling	MAC	Dropped men's wrestling
Connecticut College Camels (Note: Connecticut College and Johns Hopkins are both Division III members. However, men's water polo is a "National Collegiate" sport with a single championship open to members of all divisions.)	Men's water polo	NWPC (Note: Northeast Water Polo Conference, one of the two subgroups within the Collegiate Water Polo Association.)	MPSF
Delaware Fightin' Blue Hens	Full membership	CAA	CUSA
Delaware Fightin' Blue Hens	Field hockey	CAA	MPSF
Delaware Fightin' Blue Hens	Football	CAA Football	CUSA
Delaware Fightin' Blue Hens	Women's ice hockey	No team	Atlantic Hockey America (Note: When Delaware announced the addition of women's ice hockey, it announced that it would join the women-only College Hockey America (CHA). However, CHA had already announced plans to merge with the men-only Atlantic Hockey Association after the 2023–24 season. The merged conference now operates as Atlantic Hockey America, with Delaware joining on the announced schedule.)
Delaware Fightin' Blue Hens	Men's lacrosse	CAA	A-10
Delaware Fightin' Blue Hens	Women's rowing	CAA	MAC
Delaware Fightin' Blue Hens	Men's soccer	CAA	Summit
Delaware Fightin' Blue Hens	Men's and women's swimming & diving	CAA	ASUN
Delaware State Hornets	Women's wrestling (Note: Women's wrestling, previously part of the NCAA Emerging Sports for Women program, became an official NCAA championship sport in 2025–26. The championship meet is a single meet open to all NCAA members regardless of division through the 2026–27 season, after which a separate Division III championship will be introduced.)	No team	Independent
Eastern Illinois Panthers	Men's tennis	Horizon	Dropped men's tennis
Eastern Illinois Panthers	Women's tennis	OVC	Dropped women's tennis
Eastern Michigan Eagles	Women's rowing	CAA	MAC
Eastern Washington Eagles	Men's golf	No team	Big Sky
Florida State Seminoles	Beach volleyball	CCSA	Big 12 (Note: Florida State and South Carolina were originally announced as incoming beach volleyball members of the Mountain Pacific Sports Federation, but instead became Big 12 affiliates in that sport.)
Florida State Seminoles	Women's lacrosse	No team	ACC
Francis Marion Patriots (Note: Francis Marion is a Division II member that plays Division I men's golf.)	Men's golf	Southland	Big Sky
Georgia Southern Eagles	Women's swimming & diving	Sun Belt	ASUN
Grand Canyon Antelopes	Full membership	WAC	Mountain West
Grand Canyon Antelopes	Men's swimming & diving	WAC	Big West
Grand Canyon Antelopes	Men's volleyball	MPSF	Dropped men's volleyball
High Point Panthers	Women's rowing	Independent	MAC
Idaho Vandals	Men's golf	Big West	Big Sky
Idaho Vandals	Women's swimming & diving	WAC	MPSF
Iowa State Cyclones	Women's gymnastics	Big 12	Dropped women's gymnastics (Note: After competing in four meets during the 2025–26 season, Iowa State canceled the remainder of its season and completely dropped the sport.)
James Madison Dukes	Women's swimming & diving	Sun Belt	American
Jamestown Jimmies (Note: Jamestown and Jessup started transitions from the NAIA to NCAA Division II in 2024–25, and aligned fully with the NCAA in 2025–26. The NCAA's top-level men's volleyball championship is open to members of Divisions I and II.)	Men's volleyball	GPAC (NAIA)	GLVC (NCAA D-II)
Jessup Warriors	Men's volleyball	No team	MPSF
Johns Hopkins Blue Jays	Men's water polo	MAWPC (Note: Mid-Atlantic Water Polo Conference, one of the two subgroups within the Collegiate Water Polo Association.)	MPSF
La Salle Explorers	Acrobatics & tumbling	No team	Independent
La Salle Explorers	Baseball	No team	A-10
La Salle Explorers	Women's rugby (Note: Women's rugby does not have an NCAA-sanctioned championship, but is currently part of the NCAA Emerging Sports for Women program.)	No team	Independent
La Salle Explorers	Women's triathlon (Note: Women's triathlon does not have an NCAA-sanctioned championship, but is currently part of the NCAA Emerging Sports for Women program.)	No team	Independent
Liberty Lady Flames	Women's swimming & diving	ASUN	American
Louisiana–Monroe Warhawks	Women's tennis	Sun Belt	Dropped women's tennis
LSU Tigers	Beach volleyball	CCSA	MPSF
Manhattan Jaspers	Acrobatics & tumbling	No team	Independent
Manhattan Jaspers	Women's golf	No team	MAAC
Manhattan Jaspers	Men's volleyball	No team	NEC
Marquette Golden Eagles	Women's swimming (Note: Marquette's program will initially feature swimmers only, with no divers.)	No team	Big East
Marshall Thundering Herd	Women's swimming & diving	Sun Belt	American
Maryland Eastern Shore Hawks	Men's volleyball	No team	NEC
Maryville Saints (Note: This school is a Division II member. The NCAA organizes a joint national championship event open to D-I and D-II members, and scholarship limits are identical in both divisions.)	Men's volleyball	Independent	GLVC (NCAA D-II)
Missouri S&T Miners	Men's volleyball	Independent	GLVC (NCAA D-II)
Missouri State Bears and Lady Bears	Full membership	MVC	CUSA
Missouri State Bears	Football	MVFC	CUSA
Missouri State Bears	Men's soccer	MVC	American
Nebraska Cornhuskers	Bowling	Independent	CUSA
New Haven Chargers	Full membership	NE-10 (NCAA D-II)	NEC
New Mexico State Aggies	Women's swimming & diving	WAC	MPSF
Newberry Wolves	Men's volleyball	No team	Independent
NJIT Highlanders	Men's and women's tennis	Southland	Big South
Northern Arizona Lumberjacks	Women's swimming & diving	WAC	MPSF
Northern Colorado Bears	Men's golf	Summit	Big Sky
Northern Colorado Bears	Women's swimming & diving	WAC	MPSF
Northern Kentucky Norse	Men's volleyball	No team	MIVA
Old Dominion Monarchs	Women's swimming & diving	Sun Belt	ASUN
Pacific Tigers	Men's cross country	No team	WCC
Pacific Tigers	Men's and women's diving (Note: Pacific already sponsored swimming for both sexes, but had not included diving in its aquatics program.)	No team	MPSF
Pacific Tigers	Men's indoor and outdoor track & field	No team	Independent
Providence Friars	Men's and women's golf	No teams	Big East
Purdue Fort Wayne Mastodons	Baseball, softball	Horizon	Dropped both sports
Quincy Hawks	Men's volleyball	MIVA	GLVC (NCAA D-II)
Radford Highlanders	Men's indoor and outdoor track & field (Note: The new men's track & field programs were initially distance-focused, building on Radford's preexisting men's cross country program.)	No teams	Big South
Radford Highlanders	Men's and women's tennis	Big South	Dropped tennis
Richmond Spiders	Football	CAA Football	Patriot
Rockhurst Hawks	Men's volleyball	Independent	GLVC (NCAA D-II)
Roosevelt Lakers	Men's volleyball	Independent	GLVC (NCAA D-II)
Sacramento State Hornets	Men's golf	Big West	Big Sky
Sacred Heart Pioneers	Bowling	Independent	CUSA
San Diego Toreros	Women's swimming & diving	MPSF	Big West
San Jose State Spartans	Beach volleyball	Southland	MPSF
Seattle Redhawks	Full membership	WAC	WCC
Seattle Redhawks	Women's rowing	WIRA	WCC
Seattle Redhawks	Men's and women's swimming & diving	WAC	Big West
Seattle Redhawks	Men's tennis, men's and women's indoor track & field	WAC	Dropped all three sports
South Carolina Gamecocks	Beach volleyball	CCSA	Big 12
South Florida Bulls	Beach volleyball	No team	CUSA
Southwest Baptist Bearcats	Men's volleyball	No team	GLVC (NCAA D-II)
Stephen F. Austin Lumberjacks and Ladyjacks	Beach volleyball, men's & women's golf	Southland	Dropped all three sports
Stephen F. Austin Ladyjacks	Bowling	CUSA	Dropped bowling
Temple Owls	Women's rowing	Independent	MAC
Texas Longhorns	Beach volleyball	CCSA	MPSF
Thomas More Saints	Men's volleyball	Independent	GLVC (NCAA D-II)
Toledo Rockets	Women's rowing	No team	MAC
UC Davis Aggies	Field hockey	America East	MPSF
UC Merced Golden Bobcats (Note: UC Merced began a transition from the NAIA to NCAA Division II in 2024–25, and aligned fully with the NCAA in 2025–26. The NCAA's top-level men's volleyball championship is open to members of Divisions I and II, and the NCAA water polo championships for both men and women are open to members of all three NCAA divisions.)	Men's volleyball	CalPac (NAIA)	MPSF
UC Merced Golden Bobcats	Men's water polo	CalPac (NAIA) (Note: The CalPac (in full, California Pacific Conference) did not officially sponsor men's water polo in 2024–25, but its members that sponsor the sport hold a season-ending round-robin event that served as a de facto conference championship.)	WWPA
UC Merced Golden Bobcats	Women's water polo	Independent (NAIA) (Note: Before 2025–26, UC Merced competed in women's water polo both as an NAIA independent and as a member of the club division of the Collegiate Water Polo Association.)	WWPA
UMass Minutemen and Minutewomen	Full membership	A-10	MAC (Note: Several months after UMass announced its all-sports move to the MAC, that conference announced it would add women's rowing, also sponsored by UMass, in 2025–26.)
UMass Minutemen	Football	Independent (FBS)	MAC
UMass Minutemen	Men's soccer	A-10	Summit League
UMass Minutemen	Men's swimming & diving	A-10	MVC
UNLV Rebels	Men's swimming & diving	WAC	MPSF
Utah Utes	Beach volleyball	Big 12	Dropped beach volleyball
Utah Tech Trailblazers	Women's swimming & diving	WAC	MPSF
UTEP Miners	Women's tennis	CUSA	Dropped women's tennis
UT Rio Grande Valley Vaqueros	Football	No team	Southland (Note: UTRGV initially planned to house football in the United Athletic Conference, a partnership between its then-current primary home of the Western Athletic Conference and the Atlantic Sun Conference. It joined the Southland Conference in July 2024, shortly before starting its first exhibition-only football season.)
UT Rio Grande Valley Vaqueros	Men's soccer	WAC	Independent
UT Rio Grande Valley Vaqueros	Women's swimming & diving	WAC	MPSF
Vanderbilt Commodores	Women's volleyball	No team	SEC
Weber State Wildcats	Men's golf	Summit	Big Sky
West Georgia Wolves	Beach volleyball	No team	ASUN
Wright State Raiders	Bowling	Independent	CUSA
Wyoming Cowboys	Men's swimming & diving	WAC	MPSF

=== 2024–2025 ===
School	Sport(s)	Former conference	New conference
Air Force Falcons	Men's ice hockey	Atlantic Hockey Association	Atlantic Hockey America (Note: Merger of the men-only Atlantic Hockey Association and the women-only College Hockey America.)
Alabama Crimson Tide	Women's rowing	Big 12	SEC
Alabama A&M Bulldogs	Men's cross country	No team	SWAC
Albany Great Danes	Women's rowing	No team	Independent
American International Yellow Jackets	Men's ice hockey	Atlantic Hockey Association	Atlantic Hockey America
Arizona Wildcats	Full membership	Pac-12	Big 12
Arizona State Sun Devils	Full membership	Pac-12	Big 12
Arizona State Sun Devils	Men's ice hockey	Independent	NCHC
Army Black Knights	Football	Independent (FBS)	American
Army Black Knights	Men's ice hockey	Atlantic Hockey Association	Atlantic Hockey America
Bakersfield Roadrunners	Men's and women's swimming & diving	MPSF	Big West
Ball State Cardinals	Men's swimming & diving	MAC	MVC
Barry Buccaneers (Note: This school is a Division II member. Beach volleyball has a single national championship event open to members of all NCAA divisions.)	Beach volleyball	Independent	SSC (Division II)
Barry Buccaneers	Men's volleyball	No team	Independent
Bentley Falcons	Men's ice hockey	Atlantic Hockey Association	Atlantic Hockey America
Brown Bears	Men's wrestling	EIWA	Ivy League (Note: The Ivy League had technically sponsored men's wrestling before 2024–25, but the six members that sponsored the sport competed as members of the Eastern Intercollegiate Wrestling Association. The 2024–25 season was the first for a separate Ivy League conference championship event.)
Bryant Bulldogs	Football	Big South–OVC	CAA Football
Bryant Bulldogs	Men's and women's golf, women's tennis	Southland	OVC
Cal Poly Mustangs	Men's and women's swimming & diving	MPSF	Big West
California Golden Bears	Full membership	Pac-12	ACC
California Golden Bears	Beach volleyball	Pac-12	MPSF
California Golden Bears	Field hockey	AmEast	ACC
Canisius Golden Griffins	Men's ice hockey	Atlantic Hockey Association	Atlantic Hockey America
Catawba Indians	Men's volleyball	No team	Independent
Charlotte 49ers	Women's lacrosse	No team	American (Note: When the addition of women's lacrosse was announced, Charlotte was a member of Conference USA, but had already announced its move to The American effective in 2023.)
Chicago State Cougars	Full membership	Independent	NEC
Chicago State Cougars	Men's and women's golf, men's soccer	OVC	NEC
Chicago State Cougars	Women's triathlon (Note: Women's triathlon does not have an NCAA-sanctioned championship, but is currently part of the NCAA Emerging Sports for Women program.)	No team	Independent
Cincinnati Bearcats	Women's lacrosse	American	Big 12
Cleveland State Vikings	Men's lacrosse	ASUN	NEC
Colorado Buffaloes	Full membership	Pac-12	Big 12
Columbia Lions	Men's wrestling	EIWA	Ivy League
Cornell Big Red	Men's wrestling	EIWA	Ivy League
Dayton Flyers	Women's golf	MAAC	A-10
Detroit Mercy Titans	Men's lacrosse	ASUN	NEC
Duquesne Dukes	Acrobatics and tumbling (Note: At the time, acrobatics & tumbling did not have an NCAA-sanctioned championship, but was part of the NCAA Emerging Sports for Women program. The sport graduated from the Emerging Sports program in January 2026, with the first official NCAA championship to be held in 2026–27.)	No team	Independent
Duquesne Dukes	Women's golf	No team	A-10
Eckerd Tritons	Beach volleyball	Independent	SSC (Division II)
Evansville Purple Aces	Men's swimming & diving	MAC	MVC
Florida Gators	Women's lacrosse	American	Big 12
Florida Southern Moccasins	Beach volleyball	Independent	SSC (Division II)
Grand Canyon Antelopes	Beach volleyball	CCSA	MPSF
Harvard Crimson	Men's wrestling	EIWA	Ivy League
Hawaii Rainbow Warriors and Rainbow Wahine	Men's and women's swimming & diving	MPSF	Big West
High Point Panthers	Women's rowing	No team	Independent
Holy Cross Crusaders	Men's ice hockey	Atlantic Hockey Association	Atlantic Hockey America
Idaho Vandals	Men's golf	Big Sky	Big West
Indianapolis Greyhounds (Note: This school is an NCAA Division II member. Bowling, a women-only sport at the NCAA level, has a single national championship for all three NCAA divisions through the 2026–27 school year, after which a separate Division II championship will be created. Before the settlement of House v. NCAA took effect in 2025–26, effectively replacing scholarship limits in Division I with hard roster limits, Division II members were allowed to award the same number of full scholarship equivalents as Division I institutions.)	Bowling	No team	GLVC (Division II)
Indianapolis Greyhounds (Note: This school is an NCAA Division II member. Women's triathlon championships are currently operated by USA Triathlon outside the NCAA structure, though with partial NCAA recognition.)	Women's triathlon	No team	Independent
Iona Gaels	Acrobatics and tumbling	No team	Independent
Iona Gaels	Men's lacrosse	No team	MAAC
James Madison Dukes	Field hockey	Independent	MAC
Kennesaw State Owls	Full membership	ASUN	CUSA
Kennesaw State Owls	Football	Independent (FCS)	CUSA
Kentucky Wesleyan Panthers	Bowling	G-MAC	Dropped bowling
La Salle Explorers	Women's golf	MAAC	A-10
Le Moyne Dolphins	Men's lacrosse	Independent	NEC
LeMoyne–Owen Magicians	Men's volleyball	No team	SIAC (Division II)
Lindenwood Lions	Men's lacrosse	ASUN	Dropped men's lacrosse
Lindenwood Lions	Men's and women's swimming and diving	Summit	Dropped men's and women's swimming & diving
Lindenwood Lions	Men's tennis	Horizon	Dropped men's tennis
Lindenwood Lions	Men's indoor and outdoor track & field	OVC	Dropped men's indoor and outdoor track & field
Lindenwood Lions	Field hockey and men's wrestling	Independent	Dropped field hockey and men's wrestling
Lindenwood Lions	Women's gymnastics	MIC	Dropped women's gymnastics
Lindenwood Lions	Women's ice hockey	CHA	Atlantic Hockey America
LIU Sharks	Men's lacrosse	MAAC	NEC
Loyola Chicago Ramblers	Women's golf	MAAC	A-10
Loyola Marymount Lions	Men's cross country, women's rowing	WCC	Dropped both sports
Loyola Marymount Lions	Men's and women's outdoor track & field	Independent	Dropped both sports
Loyola Marymount Lions	Women's swimming & diving	PCSDC	Dropped women's swimming & diving
Menlo Oaks (Note: Menlo and Vanguard began transitions from the NAIA to NCAA Division II in 2023–24, and aligned fully with the NCAA in 2024–25. The NCAA's top-level men's volleyball championship is open to members of Divisions I and II.)	Men's volleyball	GSAC (NAIA)	MPSF
Mercyhurst Lakers	Full membership	PSAC (NCAA D-II)	NEC
Mercyhurst Lakers	Bowling	ECC (NCAA D-II)	NEC
Mercyhurst Lakers	Men's ice hockey	Atlantic Hockey Association	Atlantic Hockey America
Mercyhurst Lakers	Women's ice hockey	CHA	Atlantic Hockey America
Mercyhurst Lakers	Men's and women's water polo	WWPA	CWPA
Merrimack Warriors	Full membership	NEC	MAAC
Merrimack Warriors	Football	NEC	Independent (FCS)
Merrimack Warriors	Men's lacrosse	America East	MAAC (Note: Before announcing their moves to the MAAC, Merrimack and Sacred Heart had been announced as members of the NEC's reinstated men's lacrosse league.)
Merrimack Warriors	Men's volleyball	EIVA	Independent
Miami (OH) RedHawks	Men's swimming & diving	MAC	MVC
Missouri State Lady Bears	Acrobatics & tumbling, stunt (Note: At the time, acrobatics & tumbling and stunt did not have NCAA championship events, but were recognized as part of the NCAA Emerging Sports for Women program. Both sports graduated from the Emerging Sports program in January 2026, with the first official NCAA championship events to be held in 2026–27.)	No teams	Independent
Missouri State Bears	Men's swimming & diving	MAC	MVC
Monmouth Hawks	Bowling	MEAC	NEC
Morgan State Bears	Men's wrestling	Independent	EIWA
Niagara Purple Eagles	Men's ice hockey	Atlantic Hockey Association	Atlantic Hockey America
Northern Colorado Bears	Men's golf	Big Sky	Summit
Northern Kentucky Norse	Stunt (Note: At the time, stunt did not have an NCAA-sanctioned championship, but was part of the NCAA Emerging Sports for Women program. Stunt graduated from the Emerging Sports program in January 2026, with the first official NCAA championship to be held in 2026–27.)	No team	Independent
Northern Kentucky Norse	Men's and women's swimming & diving	No teams	Horizon
Northern Kentucky Norse	Women's triathlon	No team	Independent
Notre Dame Fighting Irish	Men's swimming & diving	ACC	Dropped men's swimming & diving (Note: Notre Dame suspended its men's swimming & diving program after an external investigation found that several team members violated NCAA gambling rules by wagering among themselves on results of their competitions.)
Oklahoma Sooners	Full membership	Big 12	SEC (Note: Oklahoma remains a Big 12 member in men's wrestling, a sport not sponsored by the SEC.)
Old Dominion Monarchs	Women's rowing	American	Big 12
Oregon Ducks	Full membership	Pac-12	Big Ten
Oregon Ducks	Beach volleyball	Pac-12	MPSF
Oregon State Beavers	Baseball	Pac-12	Independent
Oregon State Beavers	Men's basketball	Pac-12	WCC (Note: Because Oregon State and Washington State are joining the WCC as affiliate members in twelve sports, each sport is listed one at a time.)
Oregon State Beavers	Women's basketball	Pac-12	WCC
Oregon State Beavers	Women's cross country	Pac-12	WCC
Oregon State Beavers	Men's golf	Pac-12	WCC
Oregon State Beavers	Women's golf	Pac-12	WCC
Oregon State Beavers	Women's rowing	Pac-12	WCC
Oregon State Beavers	Men's soccer	Pac-12	WCC
Oregon State Beavers	Women's soccer	Pac-12	WCC
Oregon State Beavers	Softball	Pac-12	WCC
Oregon State Beavers	Women's volleyball	Pac-12	WCC
Palm Beach Atlantic Sailfish	Beach volleyball	Independent	SSC (Division II)
Penn Quakers	Men's wrestling	EIWA	Ivy League
Penn State Nittany Lions	Women's ice hockey	CHA	Atlantic Hockey America
Princeton Tigers	Men's wrestling	EIWA	Ivy League
Queens Royals	Men's wrestling	Independent	Dropped men's wrestling
Rhode Island Rams	Women's lacrosse	No team	A-10
Richmond Spiders	Women's golf	Patriot	A-10
RIT Tigers	Men's ice hockey	Atlantic Hockey Association	Atlantic Hockey America
RIT Tigers	Women's ice hockey	CHA	Atlantic Hockey America
Robert Morris Colonials	Football	Big South–OVC	NEC
Robert Morris Colonials	Men's ice hockey	Atlantic Hockey Association	Atlantic Hockey America
Robert Morris Colonials	Women's ice hockey	CHA	Atlantic Hockey America
Robert Morris Colonials	Men's lacrosse	ASUN	NEC
Rockhurst Hawks	Men's volleyball	No team	Independent
Sacramento State Hornets	Men's golf	Big Sky	Big West
Sacramento State Hornets	Women's rowing	American	WCC
Sacred Heart Pioneers	Full membership	NEC	MAAC
Sacred Heart Pioneers	Football	NEC	Independent (FCS)
Sacred Heart Pioneers	Men's ice hockey	Atlantic Hockey Association	Atlantic Hockey America
Sacred Heart Pioneers	Men's volleyball	NEC	EIVA
Saint Joseph's Hawks	Women's golf	No team	A-10
Saint Leo Lions	Beach volleyball	Independent	SSC (Division II)
Sam Houston Bearkats	Beach volleyball	No team	CUSA (Note: When the addition of beach volleyball was announced, Sam Houston was a member of the Western Athletic Conference, but had already announced its move to Conference USA effective in 2023.)
San Diego State Aztecs	Women's lacrosse	Pac-12	Big 12
San Diego State Aztecs	Men's soccer	Pac-12	WAC
San Francisco Dons	Men's and women's tennis	WCC	Dropped tennis
Simpson Storm (Note: Simpson is an NCAA Division III member. The NCAA women's gymnastics championship is open to members of all three NCAA divisions.)	Women's gymnastics	Independent	WIAC (Note: The WIAC is a Division III conference that sponsors women's gymnastics as a de facto Division I sport.)
SMU Mustangs	Full membership	American	ACC
SMU Mustangs	Men's swimming & diving	ASUN	ACC
South Florida Bulls	Women's lacrosse	No team	American
Southern Illinois Salukis	Men's swimming & diving	MAC	MVC
Stanford Cardinal	Full membership	Pac-12	ACC
Stanford Cardinal	Beach volleyball	Pac-12	MPSF
Stanford Cardinal	Field hockey	AmEast	ACC
Stephen F. Austin Lumberjacks and Ladyjacks	Full membership	WAC	Southland
Stephen F. Austin Ladyjacks	Beach volleyball	Sun Belt	Southland
Stephen F. Austin Lumberjacks	Football	UAC	Southland
Syracuse Orange	Women's ice hockey	CHA	Atlantic Hockey America
Tampa Spartans	Beach volleyball	Independent	SSC (Division II)
TCU Horned Frogs	Beach volleyball	CUSA	Big 12
Tennessee Lady Volunteers	Women's rowing	Big 12	SEC
Texas Longhorns	Full membership	Big 12	SEC
Tulsa Golden Hurricane	Women's rowing	American	Big 12
UC Davis Aggies	Women's lacrosse	Pac-12	Big 12
UC Davis Aggies	Women's swimming & diving	MPSF	Big West
UC San Diego Tritons	Men's and women's swimming & diving	MPSF	Big West
UC Santa Barbara Gauchos	Men's and women's swimming & diving	MPSF	Big West
UCLA Bruins	Full membership	Pac-12	Big Ten
UCLA Bruins	Beach volleyball	Pac-12	MPSF
UCLA Bruins	Men's and women's indoor track & field	MPSF	Big Ten
UIC Flames	Men's swimming & diving	MAC	MVC
USC Trojans	Full membership	Pac-12	Big Ten
USC Trojans	Beach volleyball	Pac-12	MPSF
USC Trojans	Men's and women's indoor track & field	MPSF	Big Ten
UT Rio Grande Valley Vaqueros	Full membership	WAC	Southland (Note: While UTRGV left the WAC for the Southland Conference after the 2023–24 school year, it remained a WAC associate in men's soccer and women's swimming & diving, neither of which the SLC sponsors.)
UT Rio Grande Valley Vaqueros	Women's swimming and diving	No team	WAC
Utah Utes	Full membership	Pac-12	Big 12
Valparaiso Beacons	Men's swimming (Note: Valparaiso aquatics for both men and women fields swimmers, but not divers.)	MAC	MVC
Vanguard Lions	Men's volleyball	GSAC (NAIA)	MPSF
VMI Keydets	Men's lacrosse	MAAC	NEC
Wagner Seahawks	Men's lacrosse	MAAC	NEC
Washington Huskies	Full membership	Pac-12	Big Ten
Washington Huskies	Beach volleyball	Pac-12	MPSF
Washington State Cougars	Baseball	Pac-12	MW
Washington State Cougars	Men's basketball	Pac-12	WCC
Washington State Cougars	Women's basketball	Pac-12	WCC
Washington State Cougars	Men's cross country	Pac-12	WCC
Washington State Cougars	Women's cross country	Pac-12	WCC
Washington State Cougars	Men's golf	Pac-12	WCC
Washington State Cougars	Women's golf	Pac-12	WCC
Washington State Cougars	Women's rowing	Pac-12	WCC
Washington State Cougars	Women's soccer	Pac-12	WCC
Washington State Cougars	Women's swimming & diving	Pac-12	MW
Washington State Cougars	Women's tennis	Pac-12	WCC
Washington State Cougars	Women's volleyball	Pac-12	WCC
Weber State Wildcats	Men's golf	Big Sky	Summit
West Georgia Wolves	Full membership	Gulf South (NCAA D-II)	ASUN
West Georgia Wolves	Football	Gulf South (NCAA D-II)	UAC
West Georgia Wolves	Men's indoor and outdoor track & field	No teams	ASUN
Western Illinois Leathernecks	Football	MVFC	Big South–OVC
Western Illinois Leathernecks	Men's soccer	Summit	OVC
Wichita State Shockers	Bowling	Club team	CUSA

=== 2023–2024 ===
School	Sport(s)	Former conference	New conference
Abilene Christian Wildcats	Football	WAC	UAC (Note: At the time this change was announced, the merged football league of the Atlantic Sun (ASUN) and Western Athletic Conferences was known by the placeholder name of "ASUN–WAC Football Conference". The permanent name of United Athletic Conference was announced in April 2023.)
Abilene Christian Wildcats	Women's golf	No team	WAC
Air Force Falcons	Women's gymnastics	MPSF	Mountain West
Air Force Falcons	Men's water polo	WWPA	WCC
Akron Zips	Men's soccer	MAC	Big East
Alderson Broaddus Battlers (Note: This school was an NCAA Division II member. The NCAA's top-level championship in men's volleyball is open to members of Divisions I and II.)	Men's volleyball	Independent	School closed
American International Yellow Jackets	Men's volleyball	Independent	East Coast
Arizona Wildcats	Women's triathlon (Note: Women's triathlon does not have an NCAA-sanctioned championship, but is currently part of the NCAA Emerging Sports for Women program.)	No team	Independent
Arkansas State Red Wolves	Bowling	Southland Bowling	CUSA
Assumption Greyhounds	Women's ice hockey	No team	NEWHA (Note: Assumption joined the NEWHA for administrative purposes in 2022, but did not start varsity play until 2023–24.)
Augustana (SD) Vikings (Note: Not to be confused with Augustana College in Illinois, an NCAA Division III member also nicknamed Vikings.)	Men's ice hockey	No team	CCHA
Austin Peay Governors	Football	ASUN	UAC
Bellarmine Knights	Men's and women's swimming & diving	CCSA	ASUN
Bethune–Cookman Wildcats	Bowling	No team	SWAC
Binghamton Bearcats	Men's golf	Big Sky	NEC
Binghamton Bearcats	Men's tennis	MAC	NEC
Binghamton Bearcats	Women's tennis	Independent	NEC
Bluefield State Lady Blues	Bowling	No team	CIAA (Division II)
Bowling Green Falcons	Men's soccer	MAC	MVC
Boise State Broncos	Women's gymnastics	MRGC	Mountain West
BYU Cougars	Full membership	WCC	Big 12
BYU Cougars	Football	Independent (FBS)	Big 12
BYU Cougars	Women's gymnastics	MRGC	Big 12
BYU Cougars	Men's and women's indoor track and field, and swimming & diving	MPSF	Big 12
Cal State Fullerton Titans	Men's water polo	No team	Big West
California Baptist Lancers	Men's water polo	WWPA	WCC
Campbell Fighting Camels	Full membership	Big South	CAA
Campbell Fighting Camels	Football	Big South	CAA Football (Note: CAA Football is a separate entity from the multi-sports Coastal Athletic Association, known before the 2023–24 school year as the Colonial Athletic Association.)
Central Arkansas Bears	Football	ASUN	UAC
Central Arkansas Sugar Bears	Stunt (Note: Stunt, a women-only cheerleading discipline, does not have an NCAA-sanctioned championship, but competition in Divisions I and II became part of the NCAA Emerging Sports for Women program in 2023–24.)	No team	Independent
Chaminade Silverswords (Note: This school is a Division II member. Beach volleyball has a single national championship event open to members of all NCAA divisions.)	Beach volleyball	Club team	Independent
Charlotte 49ers	Full membership	CUSA	American
Chicago State Cougars	Men's soccer	MAC	OVC
Chicago State Cougars	Men's and women's golf	Independent	OVC
Cincinnati Bearcats	Full membership	American	Big 12
Clemson Tigers	Women's gymnastics	No team	ACC
Delaware State Hornets	Women's lacrosse	ASUN	NEC
Delaware State Hornets	Women's soccer	Independent	NEC
Dominican (NY) Chargers	Men's volleyball	No team	East Coast
Duquesne Dukes	Women's triathlon (Note: Women's triathlon does not have an NCAA-sanctioned championship, but is currently part of the NCAA Emerging Sports for Women program.)	No team	Independent
East Tennessee State Buccaneers	Men's indoor track & field	SoCon	Dropped men's indoor track & field
Eastern Illinois Panthers	Men's soccer	Summit	OVC
Eastern Kentucky Colonels	Football	ASUN	UAC
Florida Atlantic Owls	Full membership	CUSA	American (Note: Beach volleyball, a sport not sponsored by The American, remains in CUSA.)
Florida Atlantic Owls	Men's swimming & diving	CCSA	ASUN
Florida Gulf Coast Eagles	Women's swimming & diving	CCSA	ASUN
Gannon Golden Knights (Note: This school is an NCAA Division II member. Men's water polo has a single national championship for all divisions. In that sport, Division II members are allowed to award the same number of full scholarship equivalents as Division I institutions.)	Men's water polo	CWPA	WWPA
Gardner–Webb Runnin' Bulldogs	Men's and women's swimming & diving	CCSA	ASUN
Georgia Southern Eagles	Women's swimming & diving	CCSA	Sun Belt
Hartford Hawks	Full membership	Independent	CCC (NCAA D-III)
Hartford Hawks	Men's golf	Big Sky	CCC (NCAA D-III)
Hartford Hawks	Women's golf	MAAC	Independent (NCAA D-III) (Note: Hartford's new Division III home, then known as the Commonwealth Coast Conference and now as the Conference of New England, sponsors golf only for men.)
Hawaii Pacific Sharks	Beach volleyball	Club team	Independent
Houston Cougars	Full membership	American	Big 12
Houston Christian Huskies	Men's soccer	WAC	OVC
Incarnate Word Cardinals	Men's soccer	Independent	OVC
Iowa Hawkeyes	Women's wrestling (Note: Women's wrestling does not have an NCAA-sanctioned championship, but is currently part of the NCAA Emerging Sports for Women program.)	No team	Independent
Jacksonville State Gamecocks	Full membership	ASUN	CUSA
Jacksonville State Gamecocks	Bowling	No team	CUSA
James Madison Dukes	Women's swimming & diving	CCSA	Sun Belt
Kennesaw State Owls	Football	ASUN	Independent (FCS)
Kentucky Wildcats	Stunt	Independent (Note: Kentucky had a club team in place before elevating stunt to varsity status in 2022–23, a year before the sport was added to the Emerging Sports for Women program in Divisions I and II.)	Independent
Le Moyne Dolphins	Full membership	NE-10 (NCAA D-II)	NEC
Le Moyne Dolphins	Men's lacrosse	NE-10 (NCAA D-II)	Independent (Note: Le Moyne's new home of the Northeast Conference sponsors lacrosse only for women.)
Liberty Flames	Full membership	ASUN	CUSA
Liberty Flames	Football	Independent (FBS)	CUSA
Liberty Flames	Men's soccer	ASUN	OVC
Liberty Lady Flames	Women's swimming & diving	CCSA	ASUN
Lindenwood Lions	Men's soccer	Summit	OVC
LIU Sharks	Acrobatics & tumbling (Note: Acrobatics & tumbling does not have an NCAA-sanctioned championship, but is currently part of the NCAA Emerging Sports for Women program.)	No team	Independent
LIU Sharks	Men's fencing (Note: The NCAA currently operates a single coeducational team championship in fencing, with all bouts involving members of the same sex. At the time of announcement, LIU sponsored varsity fencing, but only for women.)	No team	Independent
Long Beach State Beach	Men's water polo	Golden Coast	Big West
Longwood Lancers	Men's and women's outdoor track & field	No team	Big South
Louisiana Tech Lady Techsters	Bowling	Southland Bowling	CUSA
Loyola Marymount Lions	Men's water polo	WWPA	WCC
Marshall Thundering Herd	Women's swimming & diving	MVC	Sun Belt
McKendree Bearcats	Men's water polo	CWPA	WWPA
Medaille Mavericks (Note: Before its closure, Medaille was a Division III member. The NCAA operates a single bowling championship open to members of all three divisions.)	Bowling	AMCC (Note: The Allegheny Mountain Collegiate Conference is an NCAA Division III league, but its bowling schools compete alongside Division I and Division II members for a single national championship in that sport.)	School closed
Mercyhurst Lakers	Men's water polo	CWPA	WWPA
Missouri State Beach Bears	Beach volleyball	CCSA	CUSA
Morgan State Bears	Men's wrestling	No team	Independent
Murray State Racers	Football	OVC (Note: Murray State was an OVC affiliate member in football for the 2022 season before joining the Missouri Valley Football Conference in 2023.)	MVFC
Navy Midshipmen	Women's triathlon	Club team	Independent
NC State Wolfpack	Women's gymnastics	EAGL	ACC
NC State Wolfpack	Rifle	GARC	Dropped rifle
New Mexico State Aggies	Full membership	WAC	CUSA
New Mexico State Aggies	Football	Independent (FBS)	CUSA
Niagara Purple Eagles	Bowling	No team	NEC
North Alabama Lions	Football	ASUN	UAC
North Florida Ospreys	Women's swimming & diving	CCSA	ASUN
North Carolina Tar Heels	Women's gymnastics	EAGL	ACC
North Carolina A&T Aggies	Football	Big South	CAA Football
North Texas Mean Green	Full membership	CUSA	American
Northern Illinois Huskies	Men's soccer	MAC	MVC
Oklahoma Christian Lady Eagles	Bowling	Club team	Independent
Old Dominion Monarchs	Men's swimming & diving	CCSA	ASUN
Old Dominion Monarchs	Women's swimming & diving	CCSA	Sun Belt
Pacific Tigers	Men's water polo	Golden Coast	WCC
Pepperdine Waves	Men's water polo	Golden Coast	WCC
Pepperdine Waves	Women's swimming & diving	PCSC	MPSF
Pittsburgh Panthers	Women's gymnastics	EAGL	ACC
Queens (NC) Royals	Men's and women's swimming & diving	CCSA	ASUN
Queens (NC) Royals	Men's volleyball	Independent	MIVA
Rice Owls	Full membership	CUSA	American
Rider Broncs	Women's lacrosse	No team	MAAC
Robert Morris Colonials	Men's ice hockey	No team	Atlantic Hockey (Note: At the time Robert Morris announced its reinstatement of men's and women's hockey, neither team had a confirmed conference home, but shortly thereafter both teams were reinstated to their former home conferences, respectively Atlantic Hockey and College Hockey America.)
Robert Morris Colonials	Women's ice hockey	No team	CHA
Roberts Wesleyan Redhawks	Men's volleyball	No team	East Coast
St. Francis Brooklyn Terriers	Full membership	NEC	Dropped athletics
St. Francis Brooklyn Terriers	Men's water polo	CWPA	Dropped men's water polo
St. Francis Brooklyn Terriers	Women's water polo	MAAC	Dropped women's water polo
Saint Mary's Gaels	Women's indoor track & field	Independent	MPSF
St. Thomas Aquinas Spartans	Men's volleyball	No team	East Coast
Salem Tigers	Men's water polo	CWPA	WWPA
Sam Houston Bearkats	Full membership	WAC	CUSA
San Diego State Aztecs	Women's lacrosse	Independent	Pac-12
San Jose State Spartans	Women's gymnastics	MPSF	MW
San Jose State Spartans	Men's water polo	Golden Coast	WCC
Santa Clara Broncos	Men's water polo	WWPA	WCC
SIU Edwardsville Cougars	Men's soccer	MVC	OVC
SMU Mustangs	Men's swimming & diving	American	ASUN
Southern Jaguars	Men's and women's golf, men's tennis	No teams	SWAC
Southern Indiana Screaming Eagles	Men's soccer	Summit	OVC
Southern Utah Thunderbirds	Football	WAC	UAC
Southern Utah Thunderbirds	Women's gymnastics	MRGC	MPSF
Stephen F. Austin Ladyjacks	Bowling	Southland Bowling	CUSA
Stephen F. Austin Lumberjacks	Football	WAC	UAC
Tarleton Texans	Beach volleyball	No team	CUSA
Tarleton Texans	Football	WAC	UAC
TCU Horned Frogs	Beach volleyball	CCSA	CUSA
Thomas More Saints (Note: Thomas More, which was a provisional Division II member in 2022–23 while competing in the NAIA, fully aligned with Division II in 2023. The NCAA organizes a joint national championship event open to D-I and D-II members, and scholarship limits are identical in both divisions.)	Men's volleyball	Mid-South (NAIA)	Independent
Tulane Green Wave	Bowling	Southland Bowling	CUSA
UAB Blazers	Full membership	CUSA	American
UC Davis Aggies	Men's water polo	WWPA	Big West
UC Davis Aggies	Women's lacrosse	Independent	Pac-12
UC Irvine Anteaters	Men's water polo	Golden Coast	Big West
UC San Diego Tritons	Men's water polo	WWPA	Big West
UC Santa Barbara Gauchos	Men's water polo	Golden Coast	Big West
UCF Knights	Full membership	American	Big 12
UCF Knights	Men's soccer	American	Sun Belt
UIC Flames	Men's tennis	Southland	MAC
UNC Asheville Bulldogs	Women's swimming & diving	CCSA	ASUN
UT Martin Skyhawks	Stunt	Exhibition team (Note: UT Martin competed in stunt on an exhibition basis in the 2022–23 school year while awaiting NCAA Division I approval to add stunt to the Emerging Sports for Women program.)	Independent
UT Martin Skyhawks	Women's tennis	OVC	Dropped women's tennis
Utah State Aggies	Women's gymnastics	MRGC	Mountain West
Utah Tech Trailblazers	Football	WAC	UAC
UTSA Roadrunners	Full membership	CUSA	American
Valparaiso Beacons	Bowling	Southland Bowling	C-USA
Vanderbilt Commodores	Bowling	Southland Bowling	CUSA
Wagner Seahawks	Men's fencing (Note: The NCAA currently operates a single coeducational team championship in fencing, with all bouts involving members of the same sex. At the time of announcement, Wagner sponsored varsity fencing, but only for women.)	No team	Independent
Western Illinois Leathernecks	Full membership (except football and men's soccer)	Summit	OVC
Western Michigan Broncos	Men's soccer	MAC	MVC
Wofford Terriers	Softball	No team	SoCon
Xavier Musketeers	Women's lacrosse	Independent	Big East
Youngstown State Penguins	Bowling	Southland Bowling	CUSA

=== 2022–2023 ===
School	Sport(s)	Former Conference	New Conference
Alaska Anchorage Seawolves	Men's ice hockey	No team	Independent
Austin Peay Governors	Full membership	OVC	ASUN
Belmont Bruins	Full membership	OVC	MVC
Belmont Bruins	Men's soccer	SoCon	MVC
Belmont Bruins	Men's tennis	OVC	Horizon
Boise State Broncos	Beach volleyball	Independent	Southland
Bloomfield Bears	Bowling	ECC (Division II)	CACC (Division II)
Bryant Bulldogs	Full membership	NEC	America East
Bryant Bulldogs	Bowling	No team	ECC (Division II) (Note: Although Bryant is a Division I member, its bowling team competes in a Division II conference. Through 2026–27, the NCAA bowling championship is open to members of all NCAA divisions. With a separate Division II bowling championship set to begin in 2027–28, Bryant's future bowling affiliation is uncertain as of May 2026.)
Bryant Bulldogs	Football	NEC	Big South
Bryant Bulldogs	Men's & women's golf and tennis	NEC	Southland
Cal State Fullerton Titans	Women's water polo	No team	Big West
California Baptist Lancers	Men's wrestling	Independent	Big 12
Caldwell Cougars	Bowling	ECC (Division II)	CACC (Division II)
Charleston Cougars	Beach volleyball	ASUN	Sun Belt
Charlotte 49ers	Men's soccer	C-USA	American
Chestnut Hill Griffins	Bowling	ECC (Division II)	CACC (Division II)
Chicago State Cougars	Full membership	WAC	Independent
Chicago State Cougars	Men's soccer	WAC	MAC
Chicago State Cougars	Men's and women's tennis	WAC	Horizon
Clemson Tigers	Women's lacrosse	No team	ACC
Coastal Carolina Chanticleers	Beach volleyball, men's soccer	C-USA	Sun Belt
Coppin State Eagles	Baseball	MEAC	NEC
Daemen Wildcats	Men's volleyball	Independent	NEC
Dallas Baptist Patriots (Note: Dallas Baptist is an NCAA Division II member, but competes in Division I baseball.)	Baseball	MVC	C-USA
Delaware State Hornets	Baseball	MEAC	NEC
Delaware State Hornets	Women's golf	Southland	NEC
D'Youville Saints	Men's volleyball	Independent	NEC
Eastern Illinois Panthers	Men's tennis	OVC	Horizon
Fairleigh Dickinson Knights	Women's lacrosse	No team	NEC
Fairleigh Dickinson Knights	Men's volleyball	Independent	NEC
Felician Golden Falcons	Bowling	ECC (Division II)	CACC (Division II)
FIU Panthers	Men's soccer, women's swimming & diving	C-USA	American
Florida Atlantic Owls	Men's soccer, women's swimming & diving	C-USA	American
Georgia Southern Eagles	Men's soccer	MAC	Sun Belt
Georgia State Panthers	Beach volleyball	C-USA	Sun Belt
Georgia State Panthers	Men's soccer	MAC	Sun Belt
Greenville Panthers (Note: Greenville is an NCAA Division III member. The NCAA holds a single national championship meet in men's gymnastics open to members of all three NCAA divisions.)	Men's gymnastics	No team	EIGL
Hampton Pirates	Full membership	Big South	CAA
Hampton Pirates	Football	Big South	CAA Football (Note: CAA Football is a separate entity from the multi-sports Coastal Athletic Association, known before the 2023–24 school year as the Colonial Athletic Association.)
Hampton Pirates	Men's lacrosse	SoCon	CAA
Hartford Hawks	Full membership	America East	Independent
High Point Panthers	Men's lacrosse	SoCon	A-10
Hobart Statesmen (Note: Hobart is a Division III member that competes in Division I men's lacrosse.)	Men's lacrosse	NEC	A-10
Holy Family Tigers	Bowling	No team	CACC (Division II)
Howard Bison	Men's golf	MEAC	NEC
Incarnate Word Cardinals	Men's soccer	WAC	Independent
Incarnate Word Cardinals	Men's and women's swimming and diving	CCSA	MPSF
Jacksonville Dolphins	Men's lacrosse	SoCon	ASUN
Jacksonville State Gamecocks	Beach volleyball	ASUN	C-USA
James Madison Dukes	Full membership	CAA	Sun Belt
James Madison Dukes	Football	CAA Football	Sun Belt
James Madison Dukes	Women's indoor track & field	ECAC	Sun Belt
James Madison Dukes	Field hockey	CAA	Independent
James Madison Dukes	Women's lacrosse	CAA	American
James Madison Dukes	Women's swimming & diving	CAA & ECAC	CCSA
Kennesaw State Owls	Football	Big South	ASUN
Kentucky Wildcats	Men's soccer	C-USA	Sun Belt
Lamar Cardinals	Full membership	WAC	Southland
Lindenwood Lions	Full membership	GLVC (NCAA D-II)	OVC
Lindenwood Lions	Beach volleyball	No team	OVC (Note: At the time Lindenwood announced the addition of the sport, it was a Division II member and had not announced a future affiliation for that sport. By the time Lindenwood's program started play, it joined a beach volleyball-sponsoring conference.)
Lindenwood Lions	Men's ice hockey	Club team	Independent
Lindenwood Lions	Men's and women's lacrosse	GLVC (NCAA D-II)	ASUN
Lindenwood Lions	Men's soccer, men's and women's swimming & diving	GLVC (NCAA D-II)	Summit
Lindenwood Lions	Men's tennis	GLVC (NCAA D-II)	Horizon (Note: The Ohio Valley Conference merged its men's tennis league into that of the Horizon League shortly after Lindenwood and Southern Indiana officially joined the OVC. The two schools had competed in their former home of the Great Lakes Valley Conference in the 2021–22 season.)
Little Rock Trojans	Full membership	Sun Belt	OVC
LIU Sharks	Men's lacrosse	NEC	MAAC
LIU Sharks	Men's volleyball	Independent	NEC
LIU Sharks	Men's water polo	Club team	CWPA
Louisiana–Monroe Warhawks	Beach volleyball	C-USA	Sun Belt
Loyola Chicago Ramblers	Full membership	MVC	Atlantic 10
Loyola Chicago Ramblers	Women's golf	MVC	MAAC
Marshall Thundering Herd	Full membership	C-USA	Sun Belt
Marshall Thundering Herd	Women's swimming & diving	C-USA	MVC
Marshall Thundering Herd	Men's indoor and outdoor track & field	No teams	Sun Belt
Maryland Eastern Shore Hawks	Beach volleyball	No team	Independent
Maryland Eastern Shore Hawks	Baseball, men's golf	MEAC	NEC
Maryland Eastern Shore Hawks	Women's golf	Southland	NEC
Mercer Bears	Beach volleyball	ASUN	Sun Belt
Mercer Bears	Men's lacrosse	SoCon	ASUN
Merrimack Warriors	Men's lacrosse	NEC	America East
Merrimack Warriors	Men's volleyball	No team	NEC
Missouri S&T Miners	Men's volleyball	No team	Independent
Monmouth Hawks	Full membership	MAAC	CAA
Monmouth Hawks	Field hockey	America East	CAA
Monmouth Hawks	Football	Big South	CAA Football
Mount St. Mary's Mountaineers	Full membership	NEC	MAAC
Mount St. Mary's Mountaineers	Bowling	NEC	Independent
Murray State Racers	Full membership	OVC	MVC (Note: Because the MVC does not sponsor football, Murray State remained in OVC football in the 2022 season until joining the Missouri Valley Football Conference (a separate though related entity) in 2023. It remains in the OVC as a rifle-only member.)
Norfolk State Spartans	Baseball	MEAC	NEC
North Alabama Lions	Football	Big South	ASUN
North Carolina A&T Aggies	Full membership (Note: While North Carolina A&T became a full CAA member, that membership did not include football. The CAA football league, branded as CAA Football, is a separate entity from the all-sports CAA, despite sharing the same administration. NC A&T joined CAA Football in 2023.)	Big South	CAA
North Carolina Central Eagles	Men's golf	MEAC	NEC
North Carolina Central Eagles	Women's golf	Independent	NEC
North Texas Mean Green	Women's swimming & diving	C-USA	American
Old Dominion Monarchs	Full membership	C-USA	Sun Belt
Old Dominion Monarchs	Women's swimming & diving	C-USA	CCSA
Pepperdine Waves	Women's indoor track & field	Independent	MPSF
Queens (NC) Royals	Full membership	SAC (NCAA D-II)	ASUN
Rice Owls	Women's swimming & diving	C-USA	American
Richmond Spiders	Men's lacrosse	SoCon	A-10
Sacred Heart Pioneers	Men's lacrosse	NEC	MAAC
Sacred Heart Pioneers	Men's volleyball	EIVA	NEC
Saint Anselm Hawks	Bowling	No team	ECC (Division II)
St. Bonaventure Bonnies	Men's lacrosse	MAAC	A-10
St. Francis Brooklyn Terriers	Men's volleyball	EIVA	NEC
Saint Francis (PA) Red Flash	Men's volleyball	EIVA	NEC
Saint Joseph's Hawks	Men's lacrosse	NEC	A-10
Saint Mary's Gaels	Women's indoor track & field	No team	Independent
San Jose State Spartans	Beach volleyball	Independent	Southland
Simpson Storm (Note: Simpson is an NCAA Division III member. The NCAA holds single national championship events in men's and women's gymnastics that are open to members of all three NCAA divisions.)	Men's gymnastics	No team	EIGL
Simpson Storm	Women's gymnastics	No team	Independent
South Carolina Gamecocks	Men's soccer	C-USA	Sun Belt
Southern Indiana Screaming Eagles	Full membership	GLVC (NCAA D-II)	OVC
Southern Indiana Screaming Eagles	Men's soccer	GLVC (NCAA D-II)	Summit
Southern Indiana Screaming Eagles	Men's and women's swimming & diving	No teams	Summit
Southern Indiana Screaming Eagles	Men's tennis	GLVC (NCAA D-II)	Horizon
Southern Miss Golden Eagles	Full membership	C-USA	Sun Belt
Southern Utah Thunderbirds	Full membership	Big Sky	WAC
Stephen F. Austin Ladyjacks	Beach volleyball	ASUN	Sun Belt
Stonehill Skyhawks	Full membership	NE-10 (NCAA D-II)	NEC
Stonehill Skyhawks	Men's ice hockey	NE-10 (NCAA D-II)	Independent
Stonehill Skyhawks	Women's ice hockey	No team	NEWHA
Stony Brook Seawolves	Full membership (Note: Stony Brook was already a member of CAA Football, which is a separate entity from the all-sports CAA.)	America East	CAA
Stony Brook Seawolves	Women's tennis	MVC	CAA
Tarleton State Texans	Women's soccer	No team	WAC
Tennessee State Tigers	Men's tennis	OVC	Horizon
Tennessee Tech Golden Eagles	Men's tennis	OVC	Horizon
Texas Longhorns	Beach volleyball	No team	Independent
Texas A&M–Commerce Lions (Note: Known since November 2024 as East Texas A&M University. The nickname of Lions did not change.)	Full membership	LSC (NCAA D-II)	Southland
Tulane Green Wave	Beach volleyball	CCSA	C-USA
UAB Blazers	Men's soccer	C-USA	American
UIC Flames	Full membership	Horizon	MVC
UIC Flames	Men's swimming & diving	Horizon	MAC
UIC Flames	Men's tennis	Horizon	Southland
UMass Minutemen	Men's lacrosse	CAA	A-10
UNCW Seahawks	Beach volleyball	ASUN	Sun Belt
UT Arlington Mavericks	Full membership	Sun Belt	WAC
UTEP Miners	Beach volleyball	No team	C-USA
VMI Keydets	Men's lacrosse	SoCon	MAAC
Wagner Seahawks	Men's lacrosse	NEC	MAAC
West Virginia Mountaineers	Men's soccer	MAC	Sun Belt (Note: West Virginia had originally announced that it would join Conference USA men's soccer in 2022. However, later conference realignment led to the demise of C-USA men's soccer after the 2022 season.)
Wilmington Wildcats	Bowling	ECC (Division II)	CACC (Division II)
Wright State Raiders	Bowling	Club team	Independent
Wright State Raiders	Men's indoor and outdoor track & field	No teams	Horizon
Xavier Musketeers	Women's lacrosse	No team	Independent

=== 2021–2022 ===
School	Sport(s)	Former Conference	New Conference
Abilene Christian Wildcats	Full membership	Southland	WAC (Note: These particular moves were originally announced for 2022. However, they were moved forward to 2021 after the Southland Conference expelled four schools that had announced their departure for the WAC.)
Air Force Falcons	Men's lacrosse	SoCon	ASUN
Alabama–Huntsville Chargers	Men's ice hockey	WCHA	Dropped ice hockey
Alaska Nanooks	Men's ice hockey	WCHA	Independent
Alaska Anchorage Seawolves	Men's ice hockey	WCHA	Dropped ice hockey
American International Yellow Jackets	Men's volleyball	No team	Independent
Augusta Jaguars (Note: Augusta is an NCAA Division II member, but competes in Division I men's and women's golf.)	Men's golf	MEAC	Southland
Augusta Jaguars	Women's golf	Independent	Southland
Augustana (SD) Vikings (Note: This school is a Division II member. Scholarship limits for acrobatics & tumbling differ between Divisions I and II; Division II members may choose to operate under the rules of either division.) (Note: Not to be confused with Augustana College in Illinois, an NCAA Division III member also nicknamed Vikings.)	Acrobatics & tumbling (Note: Acrobatics & tumbling, a women-only sport at the NCAA level, does not have an NCAA-sanctioned championship, but is currently part of the NCAA Emerging Sports for Women program.)	No team	Independent
Bellarmine Knights	Field hockey	Independent	MAC
Bellarmine Knights	Men's lacrosse	SoCon	ASUN
Bemidji State Beavers	Men's ice hockey	WCHA	CCHA (Note: This conference is a revived Central Collegiate Hockey Association, inheriting the name of a conference that had operated from 1971 to 2013.)
Bethune–Cookman Wildcats	Full membership	MEAC	SWAC
Biola Eagles (Note: This school is an NCAA Division II member. Women's water polo has a single national championship for all divisions. In that sport, Division II members are allowed to award the same number of full scholarship equivalents as Division I institutions.)	Men's and women's water polo	No team	WWPA
Bluefield State Lady Blues	Acrobatics & tumbling	No team	Independent
Bowling Green Falcons	Men's ice hockey	WCHA	CCHA
Brown Bears	Equestrian (Note: Equestrianism, a women-only sport at the NCAA level, does not have an NCAA-sanctioned championship, but is currently part of the NCAA Emerging Sports for Women program.)	Club team	Independent
Brown Bears	Women's fencing (Note: While Brown had sponsored fencing for both men and women before dropping the sport effective in 2020–21, the reinstatement of fencing applies only to women.)	Club team	Ivy League
Carroll (WI) Pioneers (Note: This school is an NCAA Division III member. Bowling, a women-only sport at the NCAA level, has a single national championship for all three NCAA divisions.)	Bowling	No team	CCIW (Note: The College Conference of Illinois and Wisconsin is a Division III league that began sponsoring bowling, a sport with a single championship open to members of all NCAA divisions, in 2020–21.)
Central Arkansas Bears	Full membership	Southland	ASUN
Central Arkansas Bears	Men's soccer	Sun Belt	ASUN
Charleston Cougars	Beach volleyball	CCSA	ASUN
Cleveland State Vikings	Men's lacrosse	Independent	ASUN
Coastal Carolina Chanticleers	Beach volleyball	ASUN	C-USA
Coastal Carolina Chanticleers	Men's soccer	Sun Belt	C-USA
Coastal Carolina Chanticleers	Women's lacrosse	SoCon	ASUN
Delaware State Hornets	Women's golf	Independent	Southland
Delaware State Hornets	Women's lacrosse	SoCon	ASUN
Detroit Mercy Titans	Men's lacrosse	MAAC	ASUN
Dixie State (Note: Dixie State University changed its forward-facing name to Utah Tech University in May 2022, ahead of the legal name change on July 1 of that year.) Trailblazers	Football	FCS independent	WAC
Eastern Illinois Panthers	Beach volleyball	No team	OVC
Eastern Kentucky Colonels	Full membership	OVC	ASUN
Eastern Michigan Eagles	Women's lacrosse	No team	MAC
Edward Waters Tigers	Men's volleyball	No team	SIAC
Fairleigh Dickinson Knights	Men's volleyball	No team	Independent
Ferris State Bulldogs	Men's ice hockey	WCHA	CCHA
Florida A&M Rattlers	Full membership	MEAC	SWAC
Florida Atlantic Owls	Beach volleyball	CCSA	C-USA
FIU Panthers	Beach volleyball	CCSA	C-USA
Francis Marion Patriots (Note: Francis Marion is an NCAA Division II member, but competes in Division I men's golf.)	Men's golf	Independent	Southland
Fresno State Bulldogs	Women's lacrosse	MPSF	Dropped women's lacrosse
Fresno State Bulldogs	Men's tennis	MW	Dropped men's tennis
Fresno State Bulldogs	Men's wrestling	Big 12	Dropped men's wrestling
Furman Paladins	Women's lacrosse	SoCon	Big South
George Washington Colonials	Men's indoor track & field, men's tennis	Atlantic 10	Dropped both sports (Note: In addition to the sports named in this listing, George Washington also dropped varsity teams in the non-NCAA sports of men's rowing, sailing, and men's and women's squash.)
George Washington Colonials	Women's water polo	CWPA	Dropped women's water polo
Georgia Southern Eagles	Men's soccer	Sun Belt	MAC
Georgia State Panthers	Beach volleyball	CCSA	C-USA
Georgia State Panthers	Men's soccer	Sun Belt	MAC
Hampton Pirates	Men's lacrosse	Independent	SoCon
Howard Bison	Men's soccer	Sun Belt	NEC
Howard Bison	Women's golf and women's soccer	Independent	NEC
Howard Bison	Women's lacrosse	ASUN	NEC
Iowa Hawkeyes	Men's gymnastics, men's swimming & diving, men's tennis	Big Ten	Dropped all three sports
Jacksonville State Gamecocks	Full membership	Ohio Valley	ASUN
Kutztown Golden Bears	Acrobatics & tumbling	No team	Independent
La Salle Explorers	Baseball, softball, men's and women's tennis, volleyball (Note: Initially, men's swimming & diving was included in the list of programs to be dropped, but this decision was reversed on May 3, 2021.)	Atlantic 10	Dropped all five sports
La Salle Explorers	Men's water polo	CWPA	Dropped men's water polo
Lake Superior State Lakers	Men's ice hockey	WCHA	CCHA
Lamar Cardinals	Full membership	Southland	WAC
LIU Sharks	Men's volleyball	No team	Independent
Louisiana–Monroe Warhawks	Beach volleyball	CCSA	C-USA
Mars Hill Lions	Acrobatics & tumbling	No team	Carolinas (Note: Conference Carolinas is a Division II conference that sponsors acrobatics & tumbling, part of the NCAA Emerging Sports for Women program.)
Maryland Eastern Shore Hawks	Women's golf	Independent	Southland
Maryville (MO) Saints	Men's volleyball	Club team	Independent
Mercer Bears	Women's lacrosse	SoCon	Big South
Michigan State Spartans	Men's and women's swimming & diving	Big Ten	Dropped swimming & diving
Michigan Tech Huskies	Men's ice hockey	WCHA	CCHA
Minnesota Golden Gophers	Men's gymnastics, men's tennis, men's indoor track & field	Big Ten	Dropped all three sports
Minnesota State Mavericks	Men's ice hockey	WCHA	CCHA
Missouri Tigers	Men's wrestling	MAC	Big 12
NJIT Highlanders	Men's and women's tennis	Independent	Southland
North Carolina A&T Aggies	Full membership	MEAC	Big South
North Carolina Central Eagles	Baseball	MEAC	Dropped baseball
Northern Colorado Bears	Baseball	WAC	Summit
Northern Michigan Wildcats	Men's ice hockey	WCHA	CCHA
Omaha Mavericks	Men's swimming & diving	No team	Summit
Pittsburgh Panthers	Women's lacrosse	Club team	ACC
Presbyterian Blue Hose	Football	Division I FCS independent	Pioneer
Robert Morris Colonials	Men's ice hockey	Atlantic Hockey	Dropped men's ice hockey
Robert Morris Colonials	Women's ice hockey	CHA	Dropped women's ice hockey
Robert Morris Colonials	Men's lacrosse	Independent	ASUN
Sacred Heart Pioneers	Women's wrestling (Note: Women's wrestling is currently part of the NCAA Emerging Sports for Women program.)	No team	Independent
St. Francis Brooklyn Terriers	Men's volleyball	Independent	EIVA
St. Thomas Tommies	Full membership	MIAC (Division III)	Summit
St. Thomas Tommies	Football	MIAC (Division III)	Pioneer
St. Thomas Tommies	Men's ice hockey	MIAC (Division III)	CCHA
St. Thomas Tommies	Women's ice hockey	MIAC (Division III)	WCHA
Sam Houston Bearkats	Full membership	Southland	WAC
San Diego State Aztecs	Women's lacrosse	MPSF	Independent
San Diego State Aztecs	Women's rowing	American	Dropped women's rowing
SIU Edwardsville Cougars	Men's soccer	MAC	MVC
Southern Miss Golden Eagles	Beach volleyball	CCSA	C-USA
Stephen F. Austin Lumberjacks	Full membership	Southland	WAC
Stephen F. Austin Ladyjacks	Beach volleyball	Southland	ASUN
Tarleton Texans	Football	FCS independent	WAC
UAB Blazers	Beach volleyball	CCSA	C-USA
UC Davis Aggies	Women's lacrosse	MPSF	Independent
UConn Huskies	Men's cross country, men's swimming & diving, men's tennis	Big East (Note: At the time UConn made this announcement, it was a member of the American Athletic Conference.)	Dropped all three sports (Note: UConn had also announced that it would drop women's rowing, but after a judge's ruling in a Title IX lawsuit brought by team members, the university reinstated rowing for a minimum of two years.)
UNC Wilmington Seahawks	Beach volleyball	CCSA	ASUN
Utah Utes	Men's lacrosse	Independent	ASUN
Valparaiso Beacons (Note: At the time Valparaiso's move was announced, it had abandoned its previous nickname of Crusaders and had yet to adopt a new one. By the start of the 2021–22 NCAA swimming season, Valparaiso had adopted its current nickname of Beacons.)	Men's swimming & diving (Note: The Valparaiso men's aquatics program has swimmers but no divers.)	Summit	MAC
Wagner Seahawks	Men's swimming & diving	No team	NEC
Wofford Terriers	Women's lacrosse	SoCon	Big South

=== 2020–2021 ===
School	Sport(s)	Former Conference	New Conference
Akron Zips	Men's cross country, men's golf, women's tennis	MAC	Dropped all three sports
Akron Zips	Women's lacrosse	ASUN	MAC
Appalachian State Mountaineers	Men's indoor track & field, men's soccer, men's tennis	Sun Belt	Dropped all three sports
Arizona Wildcats	Men's and women's indoor track & field	MPSF	Independent
Arizona State Sun Devils	Men's and women's indoor track & field	MPSF	Independent
Augustana (IL) Vikings	Bowling	CIBC (Note: The Central Intercollegiate Bowling Conference was an NCAA Division III league, but its bowling schools competed alongside Division I and Division II members for a single national championship in that sport.)	CCIW
Aurora Spartans	Bowling	CIBC	CCIW
Bellarmine Knights	Full membership	GLVC (Division II)	ASUN
Bellarmine Knights	Field hockey	GLVC (Division II)	Division I independent
Bellarmine Knights	Men's and women's swimming & diving	GLVC (Division II)	CCSA
Bellarmine Knights	Wrestling	GLVC (Division II)	SoCon
Benedict Tigers	Men's volleyball	No team	SIAC (Note: The Southern Intercollegiate Athletic Conference is a Division II league that originally planned to start sponsoring men's volleyball, a sport with a joint championship for Divisions I and II, in the 2020–21 school year. The conference never played in that season due to COVID-19 issues, instead starting play in 2021–22.)
Boise State Broncos	Baseball, women's swimming & diving	Mountain West	Dropped both sports
Brown Bears	Fencing, men's and women's golf (Note: Brown dropped three other sports, namely women's skiing and men's and women's squash. Brown did not compete within the NCAA structure in skiing, and squash is not an NCAA-sanctioned sport.)	Ivy League	Dropped all three sports (Note: Brown continues to field teams in all sports that it dropped, but at club level instead of varsity level.) (Note: In addition to the sports named, Brown initially dropped its entire men's program in the sport of athletics, encompassing three NCAA-sanctioned sports: cross country and indoor and outdoor track & field. However, the school decided to reinstate all three teams without interruption.)
Brown Bears	Equestrian (Note: Equestrian, a women-only sport at the NCAA level, does not have an NCAA-sanctioned championship, but is currently part of the NCAA Emerging Sports for Women program.)	Independent	Dropped equestrian
Bryant Bulldogs	Men's swimming & diving	MAAC	NEC
Carthage Lady Reds	Bowling	No team	CCIW
Central Michigan Chippewas	Men's volleyball	SoCon	MAC
Central Michigan Chippewas	Men's indoor and outdoor track & field	MAC	Dropped both sports
Central State Marauders	Men's volleyball	No team	SIAC
Chicago State Cougars	Baseball	WAC	Dropped baseball
Chicago State Cougars	Men's soccer	No team	WAC (Note: While Chicago State is a full WAC member, it will not play a full conference schedule in men's soccer until 2021.)
Cincinnati Bearcats	Men's soccer	American	Dropped men's soccer
Coastal Carolina Chanticleers	Women's lacrosse	ASUN	SoCon
CSU Bakersfield Roadrunners	Full membership	WAC	Big West
CSU Bakersfield Roadrunners	Men's and women's swimming and diving	WAC	MPSF
Dartmouth Big Green	Men's and women's golf (Note: Dartmouth also dropped the non-NCAA sport of men's lightweight rowing.)	Ivy League	Dropped both sports
Detroit Mercy Titans	Women's lacrosse	SoCon	MAC
Dixie State Trailblazers	Football	RMAC (Division II)	Division I FCS independent
Dixie State Trailblazers	Full membership	RMAC (Division II)	WAC
D'Youville Saints (Note: When D'Youville announced its move to D-II, its nickname was Spartans. The nickname was changed to Saints effective in 2020–21.) (Note: At the time D'Youville announced this move, it was a member of NCAA Division III but preparing to begin a transition to NCAA Division II in July 2020 as a new member of the East Coast Conference. As a transitional D-II member, it is eligible to award the same number of scholarships in men's volleyball as Division I members, but is not eligible for the combined D-I/D-II national championship until it completes the D-II transition in July 2023.)	Men's volleyball	AMCC (Division III)	Independent (Note: D'Youville's new conference home of the East Coast Conference sponsors volleyball for women only.)
East Carolina Pirates	Men's swimming & diving, men's and women's tennis	American	Dropped all three sports
Elmhurst Blue Jays	Bowling	CIBC	CCIW
Fort Valley State Wildcats	Men's volleyball	No team	SIAC
Furman Paladins	Baseball, men's lacrosse	SoCon	Dropped both sports
Green Bay Phoenix	Men's and women's tennis	Horizon	Dropped tennis
Hampton Pirates	Men's and women's golf	Big South	Dropped golf
Howard Bison	Men's and women's swimming & diving	CCSA	NEC
Howard Bison	Men's golf	No team	MEAC
Howard Bison	Women's golf	No team	Independent
Howard Bison	Women's soccer	SWAC	Independent
Illinois Wesleyan Titans	Bowling	No team	CCIW
Jacksonville Dolphins	Football	Pioneer	Dropped football
Kansas City Roos	Full membership	WAC	Summit
Kansas City Roos	Men's tennis, women's golf	WAC	Dropped both sports
Kent State Golden Flashes	Women's lacrosse	ASUN	MAC
Kentucky State Thorobreds	Men's volleyball	No team	SIAC
Lakeland Muskies	Bowling	No team	CCIW
Limestone Saints	Men's volleyball	Carolinas (Note: "Limestone College Athletics Closes Out Conference Carolinas Era" (Press release). Limestone Saints. June 30, 2020. "The Saints will still maintain a relationship with Conference Carolinas as an associate member in acrobatics and tumbling. The Limestone field hockey and men's wrestling teams will also continue in their respective leagues that are sponsored by Conference Carolinas and the South Atlantic Conference." This press release made no mention of a men's volleyball affiliation.)	Independent
Lincoln (MO) Blue Tigers	Bowling	GLVC (Note: The Great Lakes Valley Conference, which added bowling for 2019–20, is an NCAA Division II league, but its bowling schools compete alongside Division I and Division III members for a single national championship in that sport.)	Dropped bowling
LIU Sharks	Women's gymnastics	No team	EAGL
LIU Sharks	Men's ice hockey	No team	Independent
LIU Sharks	Men's swimming & diving	No team	NEC
Marian (WI) Sabres	Bowling	CIBC	CCIW
Morehouse Maroon Tigers	Men's volleyball	No team	SIAC
Mount St. Mary's Mountaineers	Men's swimming & diving	CCSA	NEC
Mount St. Mary's Mountaineers	Men's and women's water polo	No teams	CWPA
NJIT Highlanders	Full membership	ASUN	America East
NJIT Highlanders	Men's swimming & diving	CCSA	America East
NJIT Highlanders	Men's lacrosse	NEC	America East
NJIT Highlanders	Men's and women's tennis	ASUN	Independent
North Central (IL) Cardinals	Bowling	CIBC	CCIW
North Dakota Fighting Hawks	Football	Division I FCS independent	MVFC
Northern Colorado Bears	Men's and women's tennis	Big Sky	Dropped tennis
Old Dominion Monarchs	Women's lacrosse	Big East	American
Old Dominion Monarchs	Women's volleyball	No team	C-USA
Old Dominion Monarchs	Wrestling	MAC	Dropped wrestling
Paine Lions (Note: At the time, Paine was an NCAA Division II member. The NCAA operates a single men's volleyball championship open to both Division I and Division II members. Scholarship limits in that sport are the same in both divisions.)	Men's volleyball	No team	SIAC (Note: Paine ultimately never played volleyball in the SIAC. The conference did not play volleyball in 2020–21 due to COVID-19 concerns, and Paine left the NCAA for the National Christian College Athletic Association after the 2020–21 school year.)
Presbyterian Blue Hose	Football	Big South	Division I FCS independent
Purdue Fort Wayne Mastodons	Full membership	Summit	Horizon
Robert Morris Colonials	Full membership	NEC	Horizon
Robert Morris Colonials	Football	NEC	Big South (Note: Robert Morris originally planned to play the 2020 football season as a Division I FCS independent and join Big South football in 2021. After COVID-19 led the Big South to move its football season from fall 2020 to spring 2021, with three football members choosing not to play at all in 2020–21, Robert Morris became a Big South football member ahead of schedule.)
Robert Morris Colonials	Men's lacrosse	NEC	Independent (Note: Robert Morris' new home of the Horizon League does not sponsor lacrosse for either sex.)
Robert Morris Colonials	Women's lacrosse	NEC	MAC
Quincy Hawks	Bowling	No team	GLVC
St. Francis Brooklyn Terriers	Men's swimming & diving	ECAC	NEC
Seattle Pacific Falcons	Women's gymnastics	MPSF	Dropped gymnastics
Sonoma State Seawolves	Women's water polo	WWPA	Dropped women's water polo
Southern Utah Thunderbirds	Men's and women's tennis	Big Sky	Dropped tennis
Tarleton State Texans	Full membership	LSC (Division II)	WAC
Tarleton State Texans	Football	LSC (Division II)	Division I FCS independent
UC San Diego Tritons	Full membership	CCAA (Division II)	Big West
UC San Diego Tritons	Women's rowing	WIRA (Division II)	CAA
UConn Huskies	Full membership	American	Big East
UConn Huskies	Football	American	Division I FBS independent
Urbana Blue Knights (Note: Urbana was an NCAA Division II member. The top-level NCAA men's volleyball championship is open to members of both Divisions I and II.)	Men's volleyball	Independent	School closed
Valparaiso Crusaders	Men's soccer	MVC	Dropped men's soccer
Valparaiso Crusaders	Men's tennis	Summit	Dropped men's tennis
Wagner Seahawks	Bowling	No team	NEC
Western Illinois Leathernecks	Men's and women's swimming & diving	Summit	Dropped swimming & diving
Winthrop Eagles	Men's and women's tennis	Big South	Dropped tennis
Wisconsin–Whitewater Warhawks	Bowling	CIBC	Independent
Wright State Raiders	Softball, men's and women's tennis	Horizon	Dropped softball and tennis
Youngstown State Penguins	Women's lacrosse	No team	MAC
Youngstown State Penguins	Men's swimming & diving	No team	Horizon

== See also ==
- 1996 NCAA conference realignment
- 2005 NCAA conference realignment
- 2010–2014 NCAA conference realignment
- 2021–2026 NCAA conference realignment
