= Debbie Corum =

American athletic administrator

Biographical details
- Education: Vanderbilt University

Administrative career (AD unless noted)
- 1994–1996: Stanford (assistant AD)
- 1996–2000: LSU (associate AD)
- 2000–2012: SEC (associate commissioner)
- 2012–2016: Connecticut/UConn (associate AD)
- 2016–2017: Southern Utah (associate AD)
- 2017–2022: Southern Utah

Deborah Corum is an American former college athletics administrator. She was the athletic director at Southern Utah University from 2017 to 2022. Corum served as assistant athletic director for Stanford University from 1994 to 1996, as an associate athletic director at Louisiana State University from 1996 to 2000, as an associate athletic director at the University of Connecticut from 2012 to 2016, and as associate commissioner of the Southeastern Conference from 2000 to 2012. Corum graduated from Vanderbilt University with a bachelor's degree. Corum was named interim athletic director at Southern Utah University on June 20, 2017, then was promoted to the job on a permanent basis on November 30, 2017.
