= Chazz Woodson =

American lacrosse player and coach

Personal information
- Born: August 9, 1982 (age 43) Hampton Roads, Virginia, U.S.
- Height: 5 ft 9 in (175 cm)
- Weight: 165 lb (75 kg; 11 st 11 lb)

Sport
- Position: Attack
- MLL teams: Florida Launch, Long Island Lizards, Boston Cannons, Los Angeles Riptide, Chicago Machine, Ohio Machine
- PLL team: Redwoods Lacrosse Club
- NCAA team: Brown University
- Pro career: 2005–

Chazz Woodson (born August 9, 1982) is a Premier Lacrosse League player for Redwoods Lacrosse Club and head coach of the Hampton Pirates Men’s Lacrosse.

== High school career ==
Woodson graduated from Blue Ridge School in 2001.

== College career ==
Woodson attended Brown University and was a four-year letterman in lacrosse He was a two-time All-Ivy League selection.

== Professional career ==
Woodson was originally selected by the Long Island Lizards in the 2005 MLL Collegiate Draft (19th overall) and appeared in three games with the Lizards. Woodson was traded to the Cannons for midfielder Tim Byrnes and a second round selection in the 2007 MLL Draft. From 2007 to 2008, Woodson played for the LA Riptide. Prior to the 2009 season, the Riptide folded and Woodson went to Chicago to play for The Machine. In 2010, Chazz played for the Washington, now Chesapeake Bayhawks.

In 2019, Chazz was announced as a member of Redwoods Lacrosse Club in Paul Rabil’s Premier Lacrosse League.

== Coaching career ==
On August 20, 2020, Woodson was named head coach of the Hampton Pirates Men’s Lacrosse team. Hampton University is located in Woodson’s hometown of Hampton Roads, Virginia.

== Career statistics ==
=== Brown University ===
Season	GP	G	A	Pts	PPG
2002	14	7	3	10	0.71
2003	14	13	9	22	1.57
2004	14	32	16	48	3.43
2005	12	19	9	28	2.33
Totals	54	71	37	108	2.00

=== MLL ===
		Regular Season							Playoffs
Season	Team	GP	G	2ptG	A	Pts	LB	PIM	GP	G	2ptG	A	Pts	LB	PIM
2005	Long Island	3	1	0	0	1	5	0	0	0	0	0	0	0	0
2006	Boston	11	16	0	2	18	15	2.5	1	1	0	1	1	0	0
2007	Boston	6	10	0	3	13	16	1	-	-	-	-	-	-	-
2007	Los Angeles	4	9	0	1	10	5	6	2	6	0	1	7	4	0
2008	Los Angeles	12	16	0	14	30	21	0	1	2	0	1	3	1	1
2009	Chicago	5	4	0	2	6	2	3	-	-	-	-	-	-	-
MLL Totals		41	56	0	22	78	64	12.5	4	9	0	2	11	5	1
