= Southern Utah Thunderbirds women's gymnastics =

University women's gymnastics

- University: Southern Utah University
- Head coach: Scott Bauman (34th season)
- Conference: Pac-12
- Location: Cedar City, Utah
- Nickname: Thunderbirds
- Colors: scarlet & white

Conference championships
- MPSF: 2025, 2024; Mountain Rim: 2023; WAC: 2010

The Southern Utah Thunderbirds women's gymnastics team is the women's gymnastics team that represents Southern Utah University (SUU) in Cedar City, Utah. Home meets are held in the America First Event Center. The school's team, alternately nicknamed Flippin' Birds, currently competes in the Pac-12 Conference, having joined as a single-sport member in July 2026. SUU previously competed in the Mountain Pacific Sports Federation (MPSF) in 2024 and 2025, the Mountain Rim Gymnastics Conference from 2014 to 2023, Western Athletic Conference (WAC) from 2006 to 2013 and from 1991 to 1993, the Western Gymnastics Conference from 2002 to 2005, and was Independent from 1994 to 2001. The Thunderbirds are currently coached by Scott Bauman. In July 2026, the Flippin' Birds will become single-sport members of the Pac-12 Conference.

The Women's Collegiate Gymnastics Association (WCGA) represents the nation's intercollegiate gymnastics coaches within the NCAA. SUU is one of 83 NCAA women's gymnastics teams in the nation. In the NCAA Regional Championships, there are 4 Regions of 8 teams each, which totals 32 teams. You need to be one of the top two teams in your Region to advance to the Semi-finals, which has 8 teams. Top scoring individuals can go to the Semi-finals. The Final has 4 teams.

== Nickname ==
The women's gymnastics team is also known as the Flippin' Birds. The nickname "Flippin Birds" had its origins around the turn of the century in 2000. A young gymnast asked SUU coach Scott Bauman if they were the Flippin' Birds? He responded no, but that he liked it. They played around with the name a bit and made a shirt that year, and people loved it. Ever since then, the SUU women's gymnastics team has had the moniker of the Flippin' Birds.

== Coaches ==
Scott Bauman: Head Women's Gymnastics Coach from 1992–present (2025) (34 years). Led the Thunderbirds to 2 Conference Championships. Bauman was named the Region II Coach of the Year in 2023, and he was the 1993 Midwest Region Coach of the Year, 2025 MPSF Coach of the Year, 2010 WAC Coach of the Year, and the North Central Region Coach of the Year in 2003 and 2010.

== History ==
Over the past 40 years, as 2024 was the 40th anniversary of SUU's women's gymnastics program dating back to the 1985 season, the Southern Utah gymnastics program has risen from a relatively unknown program to a prominent powerhouse in collegiate gymnastics. Southern Utah has qualified for NCAA Regionals on 19 different occasions. SUU competed in the NAIA Women's Gymnastics Championships (National Association of Intercollegiate Athletics) (NAIA) Nationals in 1985, 1986, and 1988, with their best finish of 7th place in 1988. Southern Utah University's women's gymnastics team has been referred to as "arguably one of the most successful 'small schools' in women's college gymnastics. SUU has won 13 Academic National Championships and taken second 9 times. Stacie Webb scored the first perfect 10 in school history when she did it on balance beam in 2017. Elise Wheeler is the most decorated gymnast in SUU history. Elise was a 3-time All-American on bars (first team), balance beam (first team), and floor (second team) at the 2009 NCAA Women's Gymnastics Championship. She is on the List of former United States women's national gymnastics team rosters in 2000-01 as a Junior National Team member, she was inducted into Southern Utah University's Athletics Hall of Fame as part of the 2021-2022 class, and she was part of the 2010 SUU gymnastics team that was also inducted into Southern Utah University's Athletics Hall of Fame as part of the 2023 class

Four Southern Utah gymnasts have competed at the NCAA women's gymnastics tournament (Championships) in the all-around individual category:

Year	Gymnast	All-Around Place	Vault	Uneven Bars	Balance Beam	Floor
2016	Danielle Ramirez	26th	66th	71st	66th	58th
2010	Elise Wheeler	22nd	40th	15th	21st	21st
2009	Elise Wheeler	17th		13th	6th	28th
2008	Elise Wheeler					
2005	Leah Sakhitab	23rd				
1995	Angie Gunnel					

Two Southern Utah gymnasts have competed at nationals on individual apparatuses:

Year	Gymnast	Apparatus
2015	Jamie Armijo	Uneven Bars-14th
2015	Ana Jawarski	Balance Beam-30th

Each year, Southern Utah University hosts an annual women's gymnastics camp. The camp started in 2010. The summer of 2025 will be the 16th year of the camp.

== Championship results ==
=== Top 25 in the nation (7) ===
SUU has placed in the Top 25 in the nation in 2025, 2023, 2021, 2020, 2017, 2015, and 2010.

=== Conference Champions (4) ===
SUU has won 4 Women's Conference Championships – MPSF (2) in 2025 and 2024, Mountain Rim (1) in 2023, and WAC (1), in 2010.

=== Second place finishes (6) ===
Mountain Rim (2) in 2017 and 2015, Western (3) in 2005, 2004, and 2002, and WAC (1) in 2001.

The Road to Nationals is the official statistical site of NCAA Gymnastics (women's gymnastics) in the United States. Below are the final yearly results:

=== Yearly results ===
Year	Coach	NCAA Rankings	Regionals	Conference Championships
2025	Scott Bauman	21st	6th	1st
2024	Scott Bauman	27th	8th	1st
2023	Scott Bauman	22nd	6th	1st
2022	Scott Bauman	28th	7th	4th
2021	Scott Bauman	23rd	7th	3rd
2020	Scott Bauman	22nd	COVID-19	3rd
2019	Scott Bauman	26th	7th	3rd
2018	Scott Bauman	35th	6th	4th
2017	Scott Bauman	22nd	4th	2nd
2016	Scott Bauman	27th	6th	3rd
2015	Scott Bauman	16th	3rd	2nd
2014	Scott Bauman	26th	5th	3rd
2013	Scott Bauman	31st	5th	5th
2012	Scott Bauman	42nd	10th	3rd
2011	Scott Bauman	33rd	6th	2nd
2010	Scott Bauman	18th	3rd	1st
2009	Scott Bauman	35th	6th	3rd
2008	Scott Bauman	28th	5th	3rd
2007	Scott Bauman	38th		
2006	Scott Bauman	37th		3rd
2005	Scott Bauman	30th	5th	2nd
2004	Scott Bauman	30th	4th	2nd
2003	Scott Bauman	37th		3rd
2002	Scott Bauman	28th	6th	2nd
2001	Scott Bauman	47th		
2000	Scott Bauman	33rd	6th	
1999	Scott Bauman	43rd		
1998	Scott Bauman	42nd		
1997	Scott Bauman			
1996	Scott Bauman			
1995	Scott Bauman			
1994	Scott Bauman			
1993	Scott Bauman			4th
1992	Scott Bauman			
1991				

== Team records ==
=== Top team total ===
Rank	Score	Meet	Year
1	197.275	Utah State	2021
2	197.225	Central Michigan	2020
3	197.125	Brigham Young	2024
3	197.125	Utah State	2023
3	197.125	Brigham Young	2023
6	197.075	Pittsburgh	2020
6	197.075	NC State	2017
8	197.000	Brigham Young	2022
9	196.975	William & Mary	2022
9	196.975	Utah State	2022

=== Top individual all-around ===
Rank	Score	Gymnast	Year
1	39.600	Niya Randolph	2024
