= Southern Utah Thunderbirds cross country =

School, university

Southern Utah Thunderbirds
- University: Southern Utah University
- Head coach: Eric Houle (33rd season)
- Conference: WAC
- Location: Cedar City, Utah, US
- Nickname: Thunderbirds
- Colors: and

Conference champions
- Big Sky: 2020, 2015; Summit: 2011, 2008, 2007, 2006, 2004, 2003, 2001, 2000, 1999, 1998, 1997

The Southern Utah Thunderbirds men's cross country team is the men's cross country team that represents Southern Utah University (SUU) in Cedar City, Utah. The school's team currently competes in the Western Athletic Conference from 2022 forward. SUU previously competed in the Big Sky Conference from 2012 to 2021, the Summit League from 2007 to 2011, the Mid-Continent Conference (which became the Summit League) from 1997 to 2006, the American West Conference from 1993 to 1996, Independent from 1987 to 1992, and the Rocky Mountain Athletic Conference from 1967 to 1986. The Thunderbirds are currently coached by Eric Houle. SUU is one of 319 NCAA Division I cross country teams in the nation.

== History of coaches ==
Eric Houle: Head Cross Country Coach from 1992–present (2024) (33 years). Led the Thunderbirds to 13 Conference Championships. Houle was named the Mountain Regional Coach of the Year in 1999, and the Big Sky Coach of the Year in 2015 and 2020.

== Notable athletes ==
- Cameron Levins: Summit League XC Champion in 2009 and 2011; 4th in the nation at the 2011 NCAA Division I Cross Country Championships; NCAA Champion in the 5,000 meters and 10,000 meters in 2012; The Bowerman award winner in 2012; three-time Canadian XC Champion in 2010, 2011, & 2012; and two-time Olympian in 2012 (London) and 2020 (Tokyo).
- Mike Tate: is a notable long-distance runner who was the Canadian XC Champion in 2019 and Canadian 5,000 Meter Champion in 2021.
- Hayden Hawks: is an American professional trail and ultramarathon runner. He has finished top three (1st place six times) at 9 of the most competitive trail ultramarathons in the world, and he set course records at two of them.

== Championship results ==
=== Top 25 in the nation (7) ===
SUU has placed in the Top 25 in the nation in 2021, 2020, 2018, 2017, 2015, 2014, and 1999. At the 2020 NCAA Division I Cross Country Championships, SUU took 9th in the nation.

=== Mountain region champions (1) ===
SUU won the Mountain region championship in 1999.

=== Conference champions (13) ===
SUU has won 13 Men's Conference Championships – Big Sky (2) in 2020 and 2015, and the Summit League (11), which was previously the Mid-Continent Conference from 1997 to 2006, in 2011, 2008, 2007, 2006, 2004, 2003, 2001, 2000, 1999, 1998, and 1997.

=== Second place finishes (8) ===
WAC (2) in 2024 and 2022, Big Sky (5) in 2021, 2017, 2016, 2014, and 2013, and the Summit League (1) in 2009.

The U.S. Track & Field and Cross Country Coaches Association is the governing body for men's cross country in the United States. Below are the final yearly race results:

=== Yearly results ===
Year	Coach	NCAA Championships	Mountain Regionals	Conference Championships
2024	Eric Houle		11th	2nd
2023	Eric Houle		11th	3rd
2022	Eric Houle		11th	2nd
2021	Eric Houle	24th	5th	2nd
2020	Eric Houle	9th		1st
2019	Eric Houle	33rd	8th	4th
2018	Eric Houle	21st	5th	3rd
2017	Eric Houle	11th	6th	2nd
2016	Eric Houle	27th	6th	2nd
2015	Eric Houle	21st	4th	1st
2014	Eric Houle	22nd		2nd
2013	Eric Houle	33rd	7th	2nd
2012	Eric Houle		8th	3rd
2011	Eric Houle		5th	1st
2010	Eric Houle			5th
2009	Eric Houle		11th	2nd
2008	Eric Houle		9th	1st
2007	Eric Houle		12th	1st
2006	Eric Houle			1st
2005	Eric Houle			
2004	Eric Houle			1st
2003	Eric Houle			1st
2002	Eric Houle			
2001	Eric Houle			1st
2000	Eric Houle	51st		1st
1999	Eric Houle	21st	1st	1st
1998	Eric Houle			1st
1997	Eric Houle			1st
1996	Eric Houle			
1995	Eric Houle			
1994	Eric Houle			
1993	Eric Houle			
1992	Eric Houle			

=== Conference awards ===
Year	Conference	1st Team - Top 10	2nd Team - Top 20
2024	WAC	Santiago Gaitan; Jacob Peterson; Travis Feeny; Hayden Harward	Coleman Cragun
2023	WAC	Jacob Peterson; Travis Feeny	Coleman Cragun; Noah Jenkins
2022	WAC	Isaiah Labra; Travis Feeny; Santiago Gaitan	Hayden Harward
2021	Big Sky	Christian Ricketts; Nate Osterstock; Kevin Ramos	Isaiah Labra
2020	Big Sky	Stefen Rasmuson; Aiden Reed; Nate Osterstock; Christian Ricketts	Isaiah Labra; Santiago Gaitan; Travis Feeny
2019	Big Sky		Sean Newcomb; Christian Ricketts; Nate Osterstock
2018	Big Sky	Christian Ricketts; Aiden Reed; Nate Osterstock	
2017	Big Sky	Mike Tate; Matthew Wright; Josh Collins; Kasey Knevelbaard	George Espino; Aiden Reed; Christian Ricketts
2016	Big Sky	Matthew Wright; Josh Collins; Aiden Reed	Kasey Knevelbaard; George Espino; Liam Kennell
2015	Big Sky	Hayden Hawks; Mike Tate; Matthew Wright; Josh Collins; Ibrahim Ahmed	Shinano Miyazawa; Istvan Szogi
2014	Big Sky	Nate Jewkes; Hayden Hawks	Mike Tate
2013	Big Sky	Ryan Barrus; Mike Tate; Dylan Marx	Hayden Hawks; Clinton Rhoton
2012	Big Sky	Nate Jewkes; Ryan Barrus	Elijah Rono; Clinton Rhoton; Devan Antczak
2011	Summit	Cameron Levins	
2010	Summit		
2009	Summit	Cameron Levins	
2008	Summit	Cameron Levins	
2007	Summit	Cameron Levins	
