= Hampton Pirates and Lady Pirates =

Collegiate sports club in the United States

Hampton Pirates
- University: Hampton University
- Conference: Coastal Athletic Association
- NCAA: Division I (FCS)
- Athletic director: Anthony D. Henderson, Sr.
- Location: Hampton, Virginia
- Varsity teams: 15 (6 men's, 8 women's, 1 co-ed)
- Football stadium: Armstrong Stadium
- Basketball arena: Convocation Center
- Softball stadium: Pirates Softball Stadium
- Lacrosse stadium: Armstrong Stadium
- Tennis venue: Neilson-Screen Stadium
- Volleyball arena: Holland Hall
- Mascot: Petey the Pirate
- Nickname: Pirates
- Colors: Reflex blue and white
- Website: hamptonpirates.com
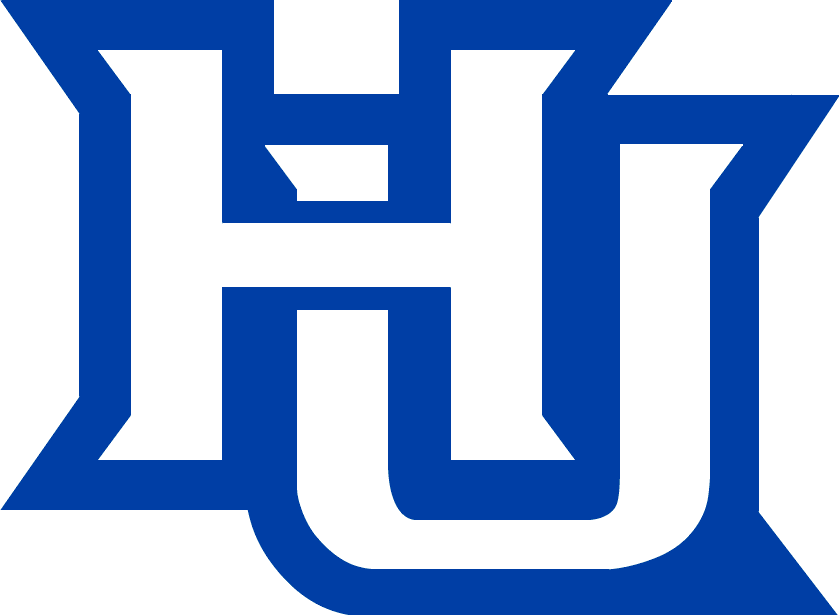

The Hampton Pirates and Lady Pirates refer to the sports teams representing Hampton University in Hampton, Virginia in intercollegiate athletics. The Pirates and Lady Pirates compete in the NCAA Division I Football Championship Subdivision (FCS) and are members of the Coastal Athletic Association.

The Pirates were previously members of the Mid-Eastern Athletic Conference between 1995 and 2018 and the Big South Conference from 2018 to 2022.

== Conference history ==
A member of the Coastal Athletic Association, Hampton sponsors teams in eight men's and nine women's NCAA sanctioned sports. The school also sponsors a co-ed varsity sailing team, but sailing is not an NCAA sanctioned sport. The lacrosse team competes as an independent.

On November 16, 2017, Hampton announced they would be leaving the Mid-Eastern Athletic Conference to join the Big South Conference. Hampton is one of three Division I HBCU (after Tennessee State University of the Ohio Valley Conference and North Carolina A&T State of the Coastal Athletic Association) to be a member of a conference other than the Mid-Eastern Athletic Conference or Southwestern Athletic Conference.'

In 2022, Hampton joined the Coastal Athletic Association.

== Teams ==
Men's sports	Women's sports
Basketball	Basketball
Cross country	Cross country
Football	Soccer
Lacrosse	Softball
Tennis	Tennis
Track and field^{1}	Track and field^{1}
	Volleyball
-	Triathlon
Co-ed sports
Sailing^{2}
^{1} – includes both indoor and outdoor^{2} – not sanctioned by the NCAA.

== Facilities ==
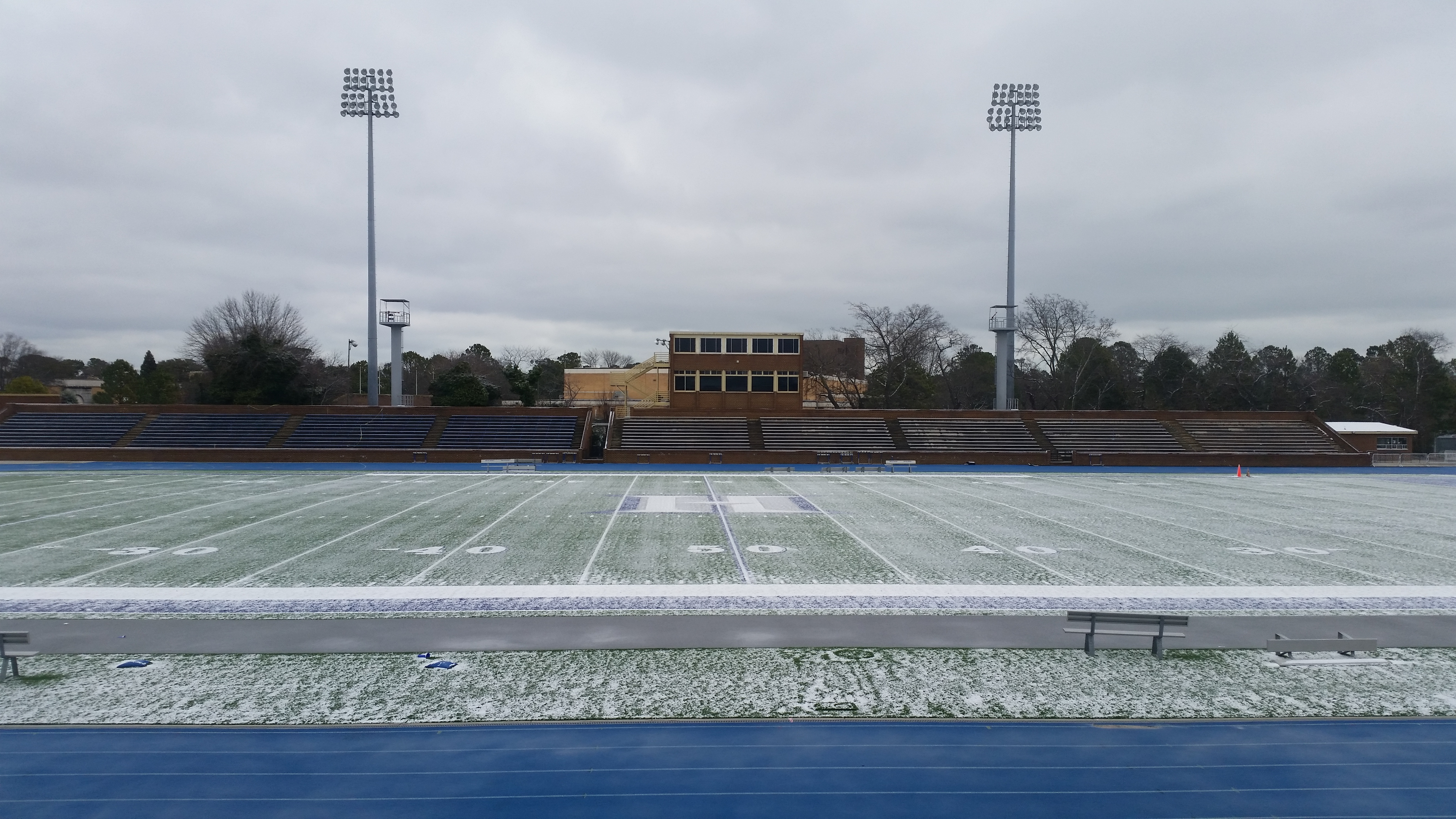
Armstrong Stadium

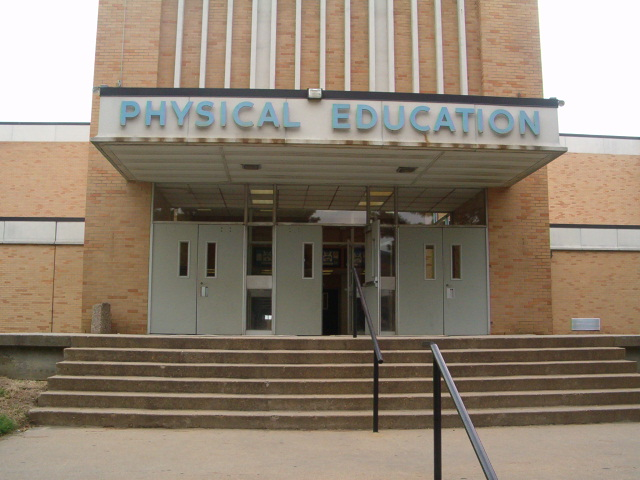
Convocation Center

Venue	Sport(s)	Opened	Capacity	Ref.
Armstrong Stadium	Football; Lacrosse	1928	12,000	
Hampton Convocation Center	Basketball	1993	7,200	
Lady Pirates Softball Complex	Softball	n/a	n/a	
Holland Hall	Volleyball	n/a	n/a	
Neilson-Screen Stadium	Tennis	n/a	n/a	

== National championships ==
=== Team ===
Assoc.	Div.	Total titles	Sport	Competition	Titles	Year	Rival	Score/ points
NCAA	Division II	3	Basketball (women's)	National championship	1	1988	West Texas State	65–48
NCAA	Division II	3	Tennis (men's)	National championship	2	1976	UC Irvine	23–18
NCAA	Division II	3	Tennis (men's)	National championship	2	1989	Cal Poly–SLO	5–1

== Rivalries ==
Hampton has two main rivals: Howard University, also known as The Real HU rivalry, and Norfolk State University, also known as the Battle of the Bay.

During Hampton's switch from the Mid-Eastern Athletic Conference to the Big South Conference, both rivalries were put on hold. In September 2019, Hampton revived their rivalry with Howard during the Chicago Football Classic. The rivalry with Norfolk State resumed on October 2, 2021.
