= Southern Utah Thunderbirds =

- University: Southern Utah University
- Nickname: Thunderbirds
- NCAA: Division I (FCS)
- Conference: Big Sky (primary); Pac-12 (women's gymnastics)
- Athletic director: Tom Higbee (interim)
- Location: Cedar City, Utah
- Varsity teams: 13 (5 men's and 8 women's)
- Football stadium: Eccles Coliseum
- Basketball arena: America First Event Center
- Soccer stadium: Thunderbird Park Complex
- Colors: Scarlet and white
- Website: suutbirds.com

The Southern Utah Thunderbirds are the varsity athletic teams representing Southern Utah University in Cedar City, Utah in intercollegiate athletics. The university sponsors thirteen teams including five men's sports: basketball, cross country, football, golf, and track and field and eight women's sports: basketball, cross country, golf, gymnastics, soccer, softball, track and field, and volleyball. The baseball program was dropped after the 2011–12 season. The Thunderbirds compete in NCAA Division I as part of the Big Sky Conference, after departing from the Western Athletic Conference (rebranded as the United Athletic Conference) on July 1, 2026. Previously, the Thunderbirds competed as members of the Summit League and the American West Conference.

Since 1961, Southern Utah has used the Thunderbird as its team mascot in the sports events they participate in. Its football team mascot is an even more powerful version of the Thunderbird, as it is inspired by Thor, a well-known god of Norse mythology.

In 2022, the Thunderbirds left the Big Sky Conference and joined the Western Athletic Conference. The football team played the 2022 season in a partnership between the WAC and the Atlantic Sun Conference. After that season, the two conferences merged their football leagues, creating what eventually became the United Athletic Conference.

The women's gymnastics team, also known as the Flippin' Birds, is a member of the Mountain Pacific Sports Federation, joining that for the 2023–24 season after the demise of its former gymnastics home of the Mountain Rim Gymnastics Conference.

On June 25, 2025, the Thunderbirds announced that they would be joining the Big Sky Conference alongside fellow WAC member and rival Utah Tech starting in 2026. That September, the Pac-12 Conference announced that the Flippin' Birds would join as a single-sport member, also in 2026.

== Sports sponsored ==
A member of the Western Athletic Conference. SUU sponsors teams in six men's and nine women's NCAA sanctioned sports.

Men's sports	Women's sports
Basketball	Basketball
Cross country	Cross country
Football	Golf
Golf	Gymnastics
Track and field^{†}	Soccer
	Softball
	Track and field^{†}
	Volleyball
† – Track and field includes both indoor and outdoor
