= Mountain Rim Gymnastics Conference =

- Association: NCAA
- Founded: 2013
- Folded: 2023
- Commissioner: Dr. Brian Evans (since 2013)
- Sports fielded: 1; women's: 1
- Division: Division I
- No. of teams: 5
- Headquarters: Logan, Utah
- Region: Western United States
- Website: https://www.mountainrimgym.com

The Mountain Rim Gymnastics Conference (MRGC) was an NCAA Division I women's gymnastics conference for schools that did not have women's gymnastics as a sponsored sport in their primary conferences. Established in 2013 and sponsoring its first competitions in 2014, the conference was recognized by the NCAA in the summer of 2014 and held its first "official" championships in March 2015 with qualifying athletes advancing to the Regionals of the NCAA Women's Gymnastics Championships. The conference was dissolved in 2023 after three of its four members departed; Utah State and Boise State began competing in their primary conference of the Mountain West after it added women's gymnastics as a sponsored sport, and BYU moved to the Big 12 along with the rest of the school's athletic programs.

== Former members ==
Institution	Location	Founded	Enrollment	Joined	Left	Nickname	Primary conference
Boise State University	Boise, Idaho	1932	22,259 (2014)	2013	2023	Broncos	Mountain West Conference
Brigham Young University	Provo, Utah	1875	34,737 (2021)	2013	2023	Cougars	Big 12 Conference
University of Denver	Denver, Colorado	1964	11,809 (2014)	2013	2015	Pioneers	The Summit League
Southern Utah University	Cedar City, Utah	1897	14,330 (2022)	2013	2023	Thunderbirds	Western Athletic Conference
Utah State University	Logan, Utah	1888	27,426 (2021)	2013	2023	Aggies	Mountain West Conference

== Champions ==
Year	Champion	Score	Host
2014	Denver	196.925	BYU
2015	Boise State	196.625	Denver
2016	Boise State	197.025	Boise State
2017	Boise State	197.050	Utah State
2018	Boise State	196.875	Southern Utah
2019	Boise State	196.950	BYU
2020	n/a*	n/a*	Boise State
2021	BYU	196.925	Utah State
2022	Utah State	197.025	Boise State
2023	Southern Utah	196.875	Southern Utah

- *Cancelled due to the coronavirus pandemic

== See also ==
- NCAA women's gymnastics tournament
