= Hampton Pirates men's lacrosse =

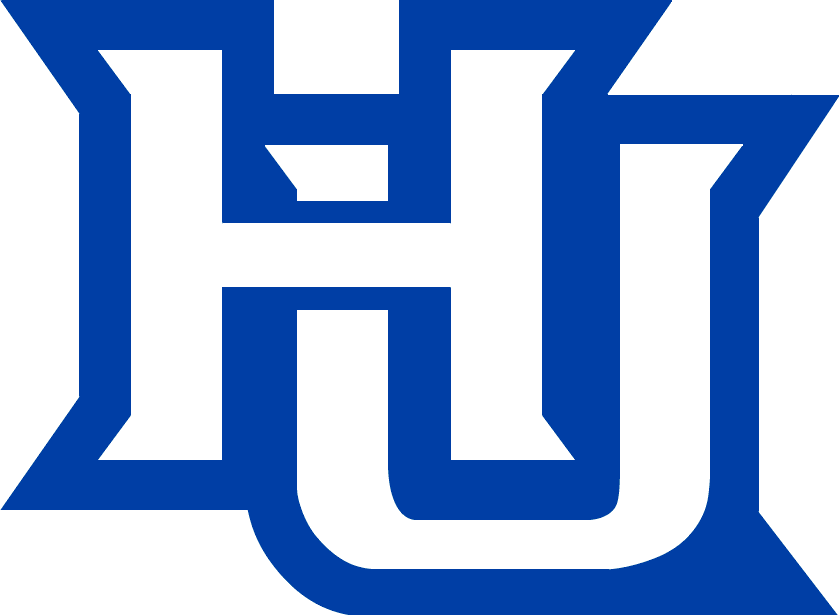
- Founded: 2016; 10 years ago
- University: Hampton University
- Head coach: Chazz Woodson (since 2022 season)
- Stadium: Armstrong Stadium (capacity: 1,500)
- Location: Hampton, Virginia
- Conference: Coastal Athletic Association
- Nickname: Pirates
- Colors: Reflex blue and white

The Hampton Pirates men's lacrosse team represents Hampton University in NCAA Division I men's college lacrosse. They compete as members of the Colonial Athletic Association (CAA).

== History ==
The Pirates' men's lacrosse program was announced on May 5, 2015, and they first competed on February 13, 2016.

On August 20, 2020, Chazz Woodson was named head coach of the team. In 2021, Hampton accepted an invitation to join the Southern Conference as an associate member in men's lacrosse, but they left the SoCon to join the CAA after only one season.

== Season Results ==
The following is a list of the Hampton results by season as an NCAA Division I program:

Season	Coach	Overall	Conference	Standing	Postseason
Lloyd Carter (Independent) (2016–2019)
2016	Lloyd Carter	0–5			
2017	Lloyd Carter	1–7			
2018	Lloyd Carter	5–8			
2019	Lloyd Carter	6–5			
Lloyd Carter:		12–25 (.324)			
Rashad DeVoe (Independent) (2020–2020)
2020	Rashad DeVoe	0–6		†	†
Rashad DeVoe:		0–6 (.000)			
Chazz Woodson (Southern Conference) (2022–2022)
2022	Chazz Woodson	0–10	0–5	6th	
Chazz Woodson (Colonial Athletic Conference) (2023–2025)
2023	Chazz Woodson	0–12	0–7	8th	
2024	Chazz Woodson	0–13	0–7	8th	
2025	Chazz Woodson	0–15	0–7	8th	
Chazz Woodson:		0–50 (.000)			
Vincent Culpeper (Colonial Athletic Conference) (2026–Present)
2026	Vincent Culpeper	0–13	0–6	7th	
Vincent Culpeper:		0–13 (.000)	0–6 (.000)		
Total:		12–94 (.113)			
National champion Postseason invitational champion Conference regular season champion Conference regular season and conference tournament champion Division regular season champion Division regular season and conference tournament champion Conference tournament champion

†NCAA canceled 2020 collegiate activities due to the COVID-19 virus.
