= 2021–2026 NCAA conference realignment =

Changes in US college athletic conferences

The 2021–2026 NCAA conference realignment was a set of extensive changes that occurred in NCAA conference membership, primarily at the Division I level, that began in the 2021–22 academic year following announcements of Texas and Oklahoma leaving the Big 12 Conference for the Southeastern Conference. Most of these changes involved conferences in the Football Bowl Subdivision (FBS) of Division I. All 10 FBS conferences that existed at the start of the realignment cycle have seen changes in their core membership. The Pac-12 Conference lost ten of its twelve members ahead of the 2024–25 academic year, leading to lawsuits and to ad hoc arrangements for its remaining two members until newly invited members could join in 2026. The Associated Press named conference realignment, and in particular the collapse of the Pac-12, as the 2023 story of the year in U.S. sports. At the Group of Six level, six members of Conference USA (CUSA) announced departures for the American Athletic Conference, now known as the American Conference, to also receive improved media exposure, which caused three other CUSA members to leave and join the Sun Belt Conference in fear of the conference folding. As a result, CUSA took in six FCS members and two FBS independents over a three-year span to remain as an FBS competitor.

== FBS conferences affected ==
=== Southeastern Conference ===
Southeastern Conference Members
SEC Members Before 2024:
SEC Members Added in 2024

On July 21, 2021, the Houston Chronicle reported that Oklahoma and Texas had approached the Southeastern Conference (SEC) about the possibility of joining that league. On July 26, Oklahoma and Texas notified the Big 12 Conference that the two schools did not wish to extend their grant of television rights beyond the 2024–25 athletic year and intended to leave the conference. On July 29, the presidents and chancellors of the 14 SEC members voted unanimously to extend invitations to Oklahoma and Texas, effective in 2025. The two schools eventually reached a buyout agreement with the Big 12 that allowed them to join the SEC in 2024.

=== Big 12 Conference ===
Big 12 Conference Members
Big 12 Members before 2023:
Big 12 Members added in 2023
Big 12 Members added in 2024
Big 12 Members departed in 2024

With the losses of Texas and Oklahoma, the Big 12 Conference was reduced from 10 to 8 teams. On September 10, the Big 12 announced that BYU, an FBS independent and full member of the non-football West Coast Conference (WCC), along with American Athletic Conference (The American) members Cincinnati, Houston, and UCF would join the conference no later than 2024–25. At the time of announcement, BYU stated that it would join the Big 12 in 2023. The other three schools entered into negotiations with The American regarding their departure date, and on June 10, 2022, an agreement on a 2023 departure date was announced.

On November 2, 2022, ESPN reported that Gonzaga University athletic director Chris Standiford had met with Big 12 commissioner Brett Yormark while the Gonzaga men's basketball team was in the Dallas area, home to the Big 12 offices, for a scrimmage with Tennessee. This meeting was reportedly part of discussions regarding a possible Gonzaga move to the Big 12 as a full member without football (Gonzaga has not had a football program since 1941). Gonzaga men's basketball has become by far the dominant program in the otherwise mid-major WCC. Going into the 2022–23 season, the Bulldogs had played in every NCAA men's tournament in the 21st century, made national championship games in 2017 and 2021, and had been a top regional seed in four of the previous five NCAA tournaments. Gonzaga, which has been transparent with the WCC about its talks with other conferences, had reportedly also been in membership discussions with the Pac-12 Conference and the Big East Conference (the latter a non-football league). Yormark would later confirm that the conference had met with both Gonzaga and UConn regarding possible membership, but the possible addition of both schools was shelved after the addition of the "Four Corners" Pac-12 members.

In late spring 2023, with the Pac-12 Conference still not having finalized a new media rights deal, multiple media reports linked Colorado, which had left the Big 12 for the then-Pac-10 in 2011, with a potential return to the Big 12. Dennis Dodd of CBSSports.com reported that Colorado had been in what was described as "substantive" talks with the Big 12. Greg Swaim, an Oklahoma radio host described by the sports and culture news site OutKick as "very plugged into the Big 12 landscape," reported over the weekend of June 3–4 that he had been told by multiple sources that Colorado and Arizona were both preparing to join the Big 12. It was also widely rumored that newly hired football head coach Deion Sanders and several influential boosters were pushing for Colorado to return to the Big 12.

Speculation about Colorado's future increased in July. First, in advance of a meeting of Pac-12 chancellors and presidents set for July 20, Colorado chancellor Phil DiStefano publicly suggested that conference commissioner George Kliavkoff provide details on a potential media deal. None were presented, and many within the conference suggested that DiStefano's request was intended to pressure Kliavkoff. After the end of the conference's football media day, which took place the day after the chancellors/presidents meeting, Colorado athletic director Rick George had to dodge many reporters while exiting the event venue. In the meantime, Big 12 officials had reportedly set a deadline of July 25 for Colorado to make a decision on its conference future. The school's board of regents scheduled two meetings for July 26 and 27 at which a Big 12 move was expected to be on the agenda, and the regents posted an agenda for the latter meeting that indicated that a formal vote of some kind was likely. The Big 12 chancellors and presidents held their own meeting on July 26, with conference expansion reportedly on the agenda, and that body reportedly voted unanimously to approve Colorado should it formally apply for membership. An application was expected after the Colorado regents' meeting the following day. On July 27, Colorado announced it would be returning to the Big 12 after 13 years.

In the days after Colorado's announcement, the Pac-12 chancellors and presidents met on August 1, at which time they were presented with the first details of a new media rights deal. This deal was reportedly an exclusively streaming deal with Apple, with returns based mainly on subscription rates. Phil Knight, co-founder and retired CEO of Nike and also an Oregon alumnus and major donor to both the university and its athletic program, strongly supported the Apple deal. This was apparently not enough to satisfy multiple members, including Arizona. On August 3, the Arizona Board of Regents, which oversees the state's three public universities, (Note: Arizona, Arizona State, and Northern Arizona) met, reportedly to discuss a potential Arizona move to the Big 12. That conference's chancellors and presidents met that same day and reportedly approved an Arizona application to join. However, there was an apparent reversal, as the Pac-12 chancellors and presidents called a meeting for the morning of August 4 during which they would accept the Apple deal and sign a grant of rights (GOR), (Note: A contractual term that, in this context, calls for all conference members to sign over their media rights to the conference in exchange for annual payouts during the term of the contract.) with a 10th school to be added later to replace Colorado. Later reports came out that two schools were to receive invitations if the Pac-12 had entered into the GOR—San Diego State and SMU. Then, 10 minutes before the meeting was to start, Washington informed the Pac-12 that it would move to the Big Ten. Washington football coach Kalen DeBoer and the university administration were concerned about the prospect that no Pac-12 games would be available on linear television. Shortly after the morning meeting was canceled, Oregon followed Washington to the Big Ten, and Arizona, Arizona State, and Utah announced they would join the Big 12 beginning in 2024.

In October 2023, The Messenger reported that the Big 12 and Gonzaga had "resumed top-level discussions" regarding a potential move to the conference, possibly as early as 2024–25. Although the Big 12 was dealing with financial and logistical issues surrounding the conference's 2023 and 2024 expansions, the conference presidents and chancellors authorized Yormark to continue discussions with Gonzaga.

The following month, the Big 12 announced it would add two women's sports for 2024–25 and beyond—beach volleyball and lacrosse. At the time, the Big 12 had only one member that sponsored each sport—Cincinnati in women's lacrosse and TCU in beach volleyball. However, each of the incoming members for 2024 sponsored at least one of the two sports. Arizona and Utah sponsored beach volleyball, Colorado sponsored women's lacrosse, and Arizona State sponsored both. The conference press release stated that new members would be added in both sports to enable automatic qualification for NCAA tournaments. This came about for lacrosse on February 21, 2024, with the Big 12 adding Florida, San Diego State, and UC Davis as affiliates for the conference's first season. At the time, Florida played women's lacrosse in The American, and the two California schools played that sport in the Pac-12. Also on February 21, the Big 12 also announced that Old Dominion and Tulsa, both then housing women's rowing in The American (Old Dominion as an affiliate and Tulsa as a full member), would join the Big 12 for women's rowing in 2024–25. The Big 12 announcement hinted at the departure of women's rowing associates and full SEC members Alabama and Tennessee, neither of which was included in the list of Big 12 rowing members for 2024–25. SEC bylaws allow it to hold a championship in any sport sponsored by at least 25% of the full membership. In July 2024, Alabama and Tennessee were joined in the SEC by Oklahoma and Texas, both of which sponsor the sport, and the SEC announced the addition of rowing with the four aforementioned programs on August 23. The Big 12 would reach the required membership level for an eventual automatic berth in the NCAA beach volleyball tournament in 2025–26, when Boise State, Florida State, and South Carolina became affiliates in that sport.

On August 23, 2024, reports about Yormark pursuing current Big East member and football independent UConn arose, with a meeting scheduled to happen no latter than the following week. However, the report indicated that not all of the conference's presidents and chancellors supported the move, predominately due to the poor performance of the school's football program since its departure from the previous FBS-sponsored Big East; any expansion requires the approval of at least 12 of the current 16 members. Ultimately, no invitation came.

=== Big Ten Conference ===
Big Ten Members before 2024
Big Ten Members Added 2024

On June 30, 2022, media reports indicated that UCLA and USC had started the process of leaving the Pac-12 Conference for the Big Ten Conference, with the Big Ten presidents and chancellors having scheduled a meeting that evening to vote on the addition of the two Los Angeles schools. Shortly after this meeting, the Big Ten and both schools issued statements setting a 2024 entry date, immediately after the then-existing Pac-12 media rights contracts expired.

On August 4, 2023, Oregon and Washington announced they would leave the Pac-12 to join the Big Ten effective July 1, 2024.

In an August 10 interview for an Ohio State fan forum, the school's athletic director Gene Smith stated that Fox, the Big Ten's primary media partner, provided extra money to facilitate the addition of Oregon and Washington. According to Smith, Fox agreed to pay $30 to $35 million per year for each of those two schools from their 2024 arrival in the conference through the end of the media deal in the 2029–30 school year. This meant that the 14 existing Big Ten members, plus UCLA and USC (which received full shares from the new media deal upon their arrival in the conference), would see no decrease in payouts during that deal.

=== Pac-12 Conference ===
– Pac-12 members before 2024
– Pac-12 members which departed in 2024
– Pac-12 members which joined in 2026

==== Collapse ====
Shortly after Oklahoma and Texas announced their departure for the SEC, Pac-12 commissioner George Kliavkoff was told by Big 12 commissioner Bob Bowlsby that the eight remaining Big 12 members were interested in joining the Pac-12. The Pac-12 subsequently formed an expansion committee made up of one official from each of the conference's travel pairings. (Note: Arizona–Arizona State, California–Stanford, Colorado–Utah, Oregon–Oregon State, UCLA–USC, and Washington–Washington State) The first and ultimately only committee meeting ended after only a few minutes when USC president Carol Folt, who represented the conference's two Los Angeles schools (UCLA and USC), objected to adding more teams and expressed surprise the Pac-12 was talking about the subject. Kliavkoff, presumably aware of USC's importance to the conference, did not push back against Folt.

On August 24, 2021, the Pac-12 and the Big Ten, along with the Atlantic Coast Conference, announced that the three leagues would be forming a scheduling alliance, likely in response to the SEC's recent expansion. It consisted of adding games between teams in these three conferences in football, as well as men's and women's college basketball.

UCLA's move to the Big Ten required approval of the Regents of the University of California, the governing body of the University of California system. In a move widely viewed as public posturing, the regents threatened to block UCLA's move. Kliavkoff was privately engaged with a group of regents in an effort to work out a deal to keep UCLA in the conference. The regents told Kliavkoff if he could guarantee UCLA a media payout of $52 million a year over the five years of a new Pac-12 media deal—roughly equal to the planned Big Ten payout, less anticipated travel expenses—plus a $15 million payment to the Big Ten to break the school's agreement to join, the regents' vote would be heavily in favor of UCLA staying in the Pac-12. When Kliavkoff presented this offer to the Pac-12 board, interim Oregon president Patrick Phillips ended the discussion by saying that Oregon did not want to be in a conference in which it made less money than UCLA. The UC Regents approved UCLA's move on December 14, 2022.

In October 2022, the Pac-12's exclusive negotiating window for a new media rights deal with its primary broadcast partner, Fox, expired without a new deal. ESPN was still interested in partnering with the Pac-12, even without UCLA and USC. Kliavkoff presented the conference chancellors and presidents with an offer of $30 million annually for each member. Internal Pac-12 analysis had indicated that the media rights were worth somewhere in the vicinity of $35 million each, giving the sides room for negotiation. However, an August 2023 report by the Los Angeles Times revealed that one of the Pac-12 presidents—not identified in the Times report, but speculated by other outlets to be Arizona State president Michael Crow, and later reported by John Canzano to be Utah president Taylor Randall—had worked with a professor on his campus to come up with an estimate of $50 million per school. Kliavkoff presented ESPN with the larger number, which caused ESPN to end negotiations.

As noted, Colorado announced its 2024 return to the Big 12 on July 27, 2023, with Arizona reportedly soon to make its own move to that conference. On August 3, 2023—the same day that the Big 12 met to approve Arizona's application to join the conference—the Big Ten presidents and chancellors met and authorized commissioner Tony Petitti to explore the addition of two other Pac-12 members, Oregon and Washington. No offers were made at that time, nor was any vote to add more schools taken. Washington's governing board met that same day, reportedly to discuss that school's options in realignment. The Big Ten presidents and chancellors met the following day, reportedly to finalize the addition of Oregon and Washington. The two schools reportedly agreed to accept a reduced payout during their first few years as Big Ten members, possibly as low as 50%—but still more in dollar terms than the reported Pac-12 deal with Apple. On August 4, 2023, Oregon and Washington announced they would join the Big Ten effective with the August 2024 expiration of the Pac-12 media contract. As noted previously, Arizona, Arizona State and Utah announced that they would leave for the Big 12 in 2024 on the same day that Oregon and Washington's move was announced.

Shortly after the August 4 mass departure, Pat Forde of Sports Illustrated wrote that the apparent demise of the Pac-12 (at least in its pre-2024 form) could have major implications for the US Olympic team in multiple non-revenue sports. Two of the four schools that then remained in the Pac-12, California and Stanford, are key feeders for the US Olympic program, and also train a significant number of athletes who represent other countries. Forde noted that at the 2020 Summer Olympics, 32 US athletes were Stanford students or alumni, (Note: One of those Stanford products was Forde's daughter Brooke, a swimmer.) and 16 others had the same connections to Cal. He also cited a 2017 study by researchers at the website OlympStats.com that found Stanford had produced more US Olympic athletes than any other university up to that time, and Cal was fourth (UCLA and USC were second and third). CBS Sports journalist Shehan Jeyarajah added that Stanford had won the NACDA Directors' Cup, an annual award presented since 1993–94 to the top overall college sports program, 26 times through 2022–23, and that "a number of non-revenue sport opportunities have been created because of the money paid out by being part of a major football league." He also asked a rhetorical question that even for the West Coast schools that joined the Big Ten, "will the insane costs of flying cross-country for routine conference games be a major deterrent to fielding robust athletic departments?"

On September 1, 2023, the presidents and chancellors of the Atlantic Coast Conference (ACC) voted to approve California and Stanford as members effective August 2, 2024. This left Oregon State and Washington State as the last two Pac-12 members. On the same day that the ACC made its announcement, American Athletic Conference (now American Conference) commissioner Mike Aresco, whose conference had evaluated those two schools as potential members, announced that The American would not add any schools in the Pacific Time Zone.

The Pac-12 then scheduled a board meeting for September 13; an email from the conference's general counsel indicated that some kind of vote could be taken. This led Oregon State and Washington State, along with their presidents, to file a civil action in Whitman County, Washington (where Washington State is located) on September 8 against the Pac-12 and Kliavkoff, requesting a temporary restraining order against the conference. The filing called for a hearing on the restraining order on September 11. The two schools contend that as the only members that have not announced their departure, their presidents are the only legitimate members of the conference's board of directors. According to a report by ESPN's Pete Thamel, "The essence of Washington State and Oregon State's concerns, if the league's 12 schools formally meet, is that the current members could vote to dissolve or evenly distribute the remaining assets." In the court filing, OSU and WSU pointed out that Pac-12 bylaws state that any member that announces its intent to leave "automatically cease(s) to be a member of the Pac-12 Board of Directors and shall cease to have the right to vote on any matter." The filing added that UCLA and USC were immediately stripped of their board seats and voting rights once they announced their move to the Big Ten. OSU and WSU reportedly wished to use the conference's remaining assets, including the "Pac-12" brand, as a lure for a friendly merger with the Mountain West Conference. At the September 11 hearing, Whitman County Superior Court Judge Gary Libey granted the restraining order, preventing the full Pac-12 from meeting until the ownership of the league's assets could be determined. A hearing for a preliminary injunction was scheduled for November 14. On October 9, Washington, acting on behalf of the 10 departing members, filed a motion to intervene in the lawsuit, challenging the grounds for the removal of those members' voting rights and seeking a dismissal of the suit. Before Washington's filing, the sides had entered mediation in an attempt to resolve governance and financial issues outside of the courtroom.

The preliminary injunction against the Pac-12 and its departing members was granted at the November 14 hearing, tentatively giving Oregon State and Washington State full control of the Pac-12 assets. Judge Libey issued a stay of his ruling to November 20, with no objection from OSU or WSU, to allow for the departing schools to file appeals. The University of Washington filed an emergency motion with the Washington Supreme Court two days after the Whitman County hearing, requesting a stay of that court's ruling and the extension of a temporary restraining order, in place since September, that prevented any board action without unanimous consent of all 12 members. The stay was granted, and both sides in the dispute were asked to file briefs regarding the emergency stay no later than November 28, with replies due by December 8. This action was separate from any appeals that UW or any other departing schools could have filed.

On December 15, the Washington Supreme Court declined to review the Whitman County decision, which lifted the stay on that decision and gave effective control of the Pac-12 assets to Oregon State and Washington State. Six days later, all 12 schools announced a settlement of the dispute. The departing schools agreed to forfeit an undisclosed portion of 2023–24 revenue distributions and provide "specific guarantees against potential future liabilities," while Oregon State and Washington State retained control of Pac-12 assets and future revenue. Full details of the settlement were expected to be finalized in the coming days.

With the failed attempt to keep the conference together as a backdrop, the Pac-12 parted ways with the embattled Kliavkoff, effective February 29, 2024.

The University of California Board of Regents panel approved a plan in May 2024 for UCLA to pay $10 million annually to UC Berkeley as compensation for loss in media rights revenue. These payments would subsequently be colloquially referred to as "Calimony".

==== Rebuilding ====
On September 11, 2024, Yahoo Sports writer Ross Dellenger reported that the Pac-12 was set to enter a rebuilding process by inviting various potential new members, among those being current Mountain West schools Boise State, San Diego State, Fresno State and Colorado State. The following day, the conference formally announced that the four schools would be joining on July 1, 2026.

On September 23, 2024, Utah State accepted an offer to join the league as its seventh member. This gave the Pac-12 the seven members needed to preserve its official "multisport" status, though one more football member would be needed to preserve FBS status. On that same day, Memphis, USF, UTSA and Tulane, who were floated as potential Pac-12 expansion targets, declined offers to join the conference and remained committed to the American. UNLV also declined an offer to join and remained in the Mountain West.

On September 24, 2024, the Pac-12 filed a lawsuit against the Mountain West over its 'poaching penalty', which would force the Pac-12 to pay $10 million for each member of the Mountain West that left to join it. The conference called it "anticompetitive" and "unlawful."

After discussions with multiple conferences, on October 1, 2024, Gonzaga announced its departure from the West Coast Conference for the Pac-12 beginning in 2026. Because Gonzaga does not sponsor a football team, the Pac-12 had to add at least one more full member with a football team to preserve its FBS status.

In June 2025, an obscure Twitter/X account promoting Texas State (TXST) (Note: Texas State University prefers to use the abbreviation "TXST" instead of "TSU", presumably to avoid confusion with two other in-state schools, Tarleton State University and Texas Southern University.) running back Lincoln Pare as a 2025 Heisman Trophy candidate included a picture from the Instagram story of university president Kelly Damphousse that featured two beavers floating in the San Marcos River that flows through the university's home city. The post also included an emoji that hinted at Texas State potentially joining Oregon State (nicknamed Beavers) in the Pac-12. Damphousse then reposted this message on June 10, shortly after a regularly scheduled Pac-12 meeting at which Texas State's Pac-12 candidacy was discussed. This sequence immediately led to speculation that TXST was likely to become the needed eighth full member with football.

Shortly after this post, ESPN reported that Texas State was indeed the leading candidate for Pac-12 expansion, stating that "the league's presidents are enamored with a foothold in the state and Damphousse's leadership." Texas State had been seen as a prime Pac-12 candidate for several months. An earlier Twitter/X post by Damphousse in April 2025, which followed speculation that TXST would be willing to accept a reduced media payout to join the Pac-12, hinted at the parameters of a potential offer. In the post, Damphousse commented on his love of lobster bisque: "People sometimes think that I'd be happy with half a bowl of soup. After all, a cup of soup is better than no soup at all. But for me, it's a full bowl or nothing." Placing this comment in further context, Gonzaga will receive a full share of conference media rights (though not of other football-related revenue) despite not having a football program.

Talks between Texas State and the Pac-12 escalated after the conference announced it had extended its then-current media deal with CBS Sports, making the company the anchor partner in a multi-platform package, through 2030–31. On June 25, Texas State informed the SBC that it was expecting a Pac-12 offer, and the Pac-12 had also notified the SBC of its interest in TXST at around that time. On June 27, TXST called a meeting of its system's board of regents for June 30, (Note: Public universities in Texas are subject to that state's open meeting laws, which require 72 hours of notice before a governing board meeting can be held.) during which the Pac-12 offer was accepted and the payment of a $5 million buyout to the school's current home of the Sun Belt Conference (SBC) was approved. The Pac-12 soon added another baseball member, announcing on August 20 that Dallas Baptist, an NCAA Division II member that plays Division I baseball, would leave Conference USA (CUSA) to become a single-sport member in July 2026. This was soon followed by the addition of Southern Utah as a women's gymnastics affiliate, also effective in July 2026.

TXST's move to the Pac-12 has implications not only for the SBC, but also possibly CUSA and the FCS ranks. In fall 2024, with TXST having discussions with other conferences (notably the MW), the SBC considered several CUSA members as potential replacements, with Louisiana Tech reportedly emerging as the main candidate. With the SBC being the only FBS conference with football divisions, TXST's departure would create a vacancy in its West Division, already home to two Louisiana schools (Louisiana and ULM). Also, according to ESPN, "The Sun Belt's realignment strategy for years has been to double-down on regional rivalries, and Louisiana Tech would fall into that category." In turn, CUSA has started evaluating candidates to replace any departing members, with current FCS program Tarleton State viewed as the favorite.

On March 30, 2026, the Pac-12 and the Big West Conference announced a partnership in men's soccer, a sport sponsored by the Big West that had been sponsored by the Pac-12 before its collapse. According to both conferences, the alliance was "designed to strengthen and sustain Division I men’s soccer opportunities across the western United States." With only three full members of the rebooted Pac-12 sponsoring the sport (Gonzaga, Oregon State, San Diego State), the Pac-12 needed at least three more men's soccer teams to preserve its automatic NCAA tournament bid. Under the agreement, four full Big West members—Cal Poly, California Baptist, UC Riverside, and UC San Diego—will play men's soccer as Pac-12 affiliates in the 2026 season. Both conferences will maintain their automatic NCAA tournament bids for the immediate future; each will have seven men's soccer members in 2026 and six in 2027 when UC Santa Barbara and UCSD leave for the West Coast Conference. The agreement also calls for extensive crossover matches between the two conferences.

Two days later, the Pac-12 added four men's wrestling affiliates, all of which had previously been single-sport members of the Big 12—Air Force, North Dakota State, Northern Colorado, and South Dakota State. This move gave the Pac-12 enough members in that sport to ensure an automatic NCAA championship bid, with the nine-member men's wrestling membership being its largest since 2008–09.

=== Atlantic Coast Conference ===
– ACC members before 2024
– ACC non-football member before 2024
– ACC members joined 2024

Prior to the addition of three new members, multiple media reports emerged in May 2023 that seven of the Atlantic Coast Conference's (ACC) 14 football members—Clemson, Florida State, Miami (FL), NC State, North Carolina, Virginia, and Virginia Tech—had met with legal teams in recent months to examine the grant of rights (GOR) agreement within the conference's media rights deal. In May 2012, the ACC had signed a 15-year media deal with ESPN, which was extended in 2016 to run through the 2035–36 school year. Under the GOR, if a school leaves the ACC before 2036, all remaining media revenue under the existing broadcast contract would revert to the conference. In March 2023, Florida State athletic director Michael Alford expressed frustration with the conference's revenue distribution model in a call to ACC commissioner Jim Phillips, noting that by 2024, each ACC school's share of media revenue would be at least $30 million below those of Big Ten and SEC members. Following the ACC spring meetings later in May 2023, the league agreed to a new revenue sharing model in which revenue derived from the College Football Playoff (CFP) and NCAA men's basketball tournament would be distributed based on each school's success in those competitions. Other league revenue would continue to be split evenly between member schools. The new model took effect when the CFP expanded from 4 teams to 12 in 2024. Another aspect of the media deal that would prove important in later expansion discussions is that the contract contains an escalator clause that requires ESPN to increase its payout to the ACC if it expands beyond 14 football members. By 2023, the escalator clause reportedly called for ESPN to pay the ACC an additional $24 million per year per added member.

However, this change was apparently not enough to fully satisfy Florida State. During an August 2, 2023 meeting of the university's governing board, president Richard McCullough told the board that Florida State would have to "very seriously" consider leaving the ACC, barring a more radical change to the conference's revenue sharing model.

On August 7, following the mass exodus of schools from the Pac-12, media reported that the ACC had started exploring the addition of California and Stanford, two of the four schools left behind in the exodus. However, following a conference call of ACC presidents and chancellors on August 9, it was reported that the potential expansion "hit significant roadblocks." The report also confirmed that Notre Dame, a full but non-football ACC member and thus having voting rights on conference expansion, was strongly pushing for the expansion; significantly, Stanford is one of the three schools that Notre Dame football plays every year. By August 11, the potential expansion was described by sources as being "on life support", with Clemson, Florida State, NC State, and North Carolina opposed. ACC bylaws require the approval of 75% of the full members (at the time, 12 out of 15) for any proposed expansion.

Despite this, the ACC had not completely ended expansion discussions. On August 23, reports came out that the ACC was seriously considering the addition of not only Cal and Stanford, but also SMU. At the time, SMU had been in deep discussions with both the Pac-12 and ACC for more than a year, and had also been involved with the Big 12 before that conference lost interest. All three schools were reportedly willing to make major financial concessions to join the conference, with Cal and Stanford being willing to take reduced shares of conference media payouts for at least several years, and SMU being willing to take no broadcast revenue during its first seven years as an ACC member. The three schools' financial concessions would create a pool of funds that the ACC would split among its members. The conference was working on possible financial models for this fund. At the time of the report, no formal vote on expansion had been taken. An ESPN report on August 28 indicated that there was "continued momentum" toward adding all three schools, with one of the four ACC members that had objected to expansion expected to change its vote in the coming days. A conference call involving ACC presidents and chancellors had been scheduled for that day, but was canceled due to a shooting on the North Carolina campus. The conference call was rescheduled for September 1, and the presidents and chancellors voted to approve the addition of all three schools. Reportedly, Clemson, Florida State, and North Carolina still opposed expansion, but NC State changed its vote. The two California schools reportedly joined at about 30% of a full share of media rights, while SMU is not taking any conference media revenue for nine years instead of the previously reported seven. In its ACC membership pitch, SMU also offered to serve as a hub for at least some Olympic sports (Note: In the NCAA context, "Olympic sports" most often refers to sports other than football and basketball, whether or not they are contested in the Olympic Games.) contests involving Cal and Stanford, reducing travel burdens for all other members.

Florida State's legal counsel continued to work with an outside law firm to review the ACC GOR. Despite the success initiatives adopted by the conference in August 2023, FSU had continually pushed for unequal revenue distributions based on each school's media value, a concept rejected by the ACC office. The last straw for FSU was seen as the decision of the CFP selection committee to exclude the unbeaten Seminoles from the 2023 CFP, making them the first and only unbeaten power conference team to be left out of the CFP during its 4-team era. (Note: The playoff expanded to 12 teams in 2024.) This culminated in a meeting of the university's board of trustees on December 22 in which the board voted unanimously to sue the ACC to challenge the GOR and its withdrawal fee. The meeting was immediately followed by the filing of a lawsuit in FSU's home of Tallahassee, in Leon County Circuit Court. The suit claims that the GOR and withdrawal fee, estimated at the time to be about $120 million, (Note: At the time of FSU's initial filing, the ACC's withdrawal fee was three times the conference's annual operating budget, measured at the time a school notifies the conference of its intent to leave.) violate Florida laws on restraint of trade, and also alleges financial mismanagement, breach of contract, and failure to perform. FSU became the first university ever to challenge a conference GOR in court. The ACC responded with a countersuit against FSU's governing board in Mecklenburg County, North Carolina, whose county seat of Charlotte hosts the conference headquarters. The initial complaint asked the court to uphold the GOR, and asserted that any contractual issues should be heard in the headquarters state. The complaint was later amended to allege that FSU violated the GOR by filing the court challenge, and also asserted that FSU had leaked confidential information, specifically details on the ACC media deal with ESPN, in its Florida filing.

On February 16, 2024, the ACC filed a motion to dismiss FSU's suit in Florida. The filing included language that suggested FSU could buy its media rights back from the conference, opening the door to negotiation on the terms of a potential FSU departure from the ACC.

In the following month, Clemson became the second school to challenge the GOR, filing suit in its home jurisdiction of Pickens County, South Carolina. The complaint alleged that the ACC's exit fees were "unconscionable" and "unenforceable", and claimed that the ACC's view that the GOR gave it ownership of Clemson's media rights was a "nonsensical reading" and "inconsistent with the plain language of that agreement". FSU's suit against the ACC claimed its total costs of departure (exit fee and media revenue) at the time of filing were $572 million.

The ACC, Clemson, and FSU announced on March 4, 2025 that they had settled their respective lawsuits. The settlement introduces a new conference revenue sharing model that the ACC calls "brand initiative". TV revenue will be divided 60–40, with the majority going to fund the brand initiative and the rest split evenly among the pre-2024 members. (Note: The three members that joined in 2024, California, SMU, and Stanford, are taking either a greatly reduced media payout (California and Stanford) or none at all (SMU) for several years after their ACC entry.) Revenue shares from the brand initiative in each season will be based on total viewership over the preceding five seasons, weighted more heavily toward the most recent years. Also, the conference exit fee was significantly reduced. While the GOR remains in place, the exit fee in 2026 will be set at $165 million, dropping by $18 million each year until reaching $75 million in 2030–31. Any school paying the appropriate exit fee will keep its media rights. Significantly, media rights deals for the Big Ten, Big 12, and the College Football Playoff will come up for renewal at the same time the exit fee drops to $75 million.

=== American Athletic/American Conference ===
The losses of Cincinnati, Houston, and UCF left the American with 8 remaining schools. After invitations to Mountain West Conference members Boise State, Air Force, Colorado State, and San Diego State to join the American were all declined, The American then pivoted to Conference USA (CUSA) to add 6 of its members on October 21, 2021: Charlotte, Florida Atlantic, UAB, North Texas, Rice, and UTSA. In June 2022, the six schools' entry date of July 2023 was officially confirmed. The additions put The American at 14 members for both football and basketball, with Navy being a football-only member and Wichita State being a non-football full member.

In May 2022, the AAC announced that the four schools that had remained in CUSA men's soccer after the Sun Belt Conference took five schools from the CUSA men's soccer league effective with the upcoming 2022 season—Charlotte, FIU, Florida Atlantic, and UAB—would become men's soccer members in the 2022 season, thus spelling the end of CUSA men's soccer. Of these schools, all but FIU became full members of the AAC in 2023. FIU and Florida Atlantic would also join in women's swimming & diving in July 2022, as did eventual American Conference members North Texas and Rice.

To reiterate, the AAC lost SMU to the ACC effective July 1, 2024, after the ACC voted to admit SMU into the conference on September 1, 2023. On the same day as the ACC announcement, American commissioner Mike Aresco ruled out any expansion in the Pacific Time Zone, stating that the conference would instead "focus any expansion efforts on schools that allow for sensible and sustainable competition and student-athlete well-being within our strong geographic footprint." The day after SMU's departure was announced, reports came out that The American had targeted Army as a football-only replacement for SMU, and that Aresco had begun membership discussions with Army athletic director Mike Buddie. Army's service academy rival Navy has been a football-only American member since 2015. With Army then being an FBS independent, a potential football-only conference move would not have the same financial complications as a normal conference change. Ultimately, the American announced on October 25 that Army would indeed become a football-only member starting in 2024.

However, Army's move had unique financial issues of its own. Before being announced as a new football member of the American, Army had a TV contract with CBS Sports Network (CBSSN) for its home games through the 2028 season, conflicting with the American's broadcast contract with ESPN. The CBSSN contract would remain in place unless the conference or ESPN reached a buyout agreement. Also, Army had over 80 football games scheduled in the coming years, with reported exit fees of over $35 million. The Army program hired a consultant in an attempt to cancel or reschedule as many of the games as possible. Revenue distribution was also a potential issue, as the members that joined in 2023 would not receive a full share of media revenue for several years, though the American had received significant exit fees from the schools that left for the Big 12, and would receive more with SMU's departure. The conference and Army agreed that the Army–Navy Game would continue to be played after the conference championship game as a non-conference matchup, and the two academies would not play each other prior to the traditional date except in the conference title game.

On September 23, 2024, despite rumors, Air Force declined an offer to join the American and remained in the Mountain West.

The American would eventually expand further, announcing on October 12, 2026 that James Madison, a Sun Belt Conference (SBC) member that housed its women's lacrosse and women's swimming & diving programs in the American, would fully join that conference no later than July 2028. The following month, James Madison and the SBC reached a settlement that accelerated the Dukes' arrival in the American to 2027.

In a change not related to realignment, the conference dropped the word "Athletic" from its name on July 21, 2025, becoming simply the American Conference. The initialism "AAC", which was used more by media than by the conference, was also retired, with "American" becoming the official short form.

=== Sun Belt Conference ===
The departures of the 6 schools reduced Conference USA's membership from 14 to 8, and sensing the instability of the conference, the remaining members looked to join other conferences. In late October 2021, CUSA members Southern Miss, Old Dominion and Marshall applied and were accepted to the Sun Belt Conference (SBC) to begin play in the 2022–23 season. On November 6, the Sun Belt added James Madison, a Colonial Athletic Association member playing FCS football. Due to the Colonial's existing policy of prohibiting departing members from participating in conference tournaments, JMU was slated to play the 2022–23 football season as an FBS independent with other sports playing as de facto Sun Belt affiliates; full membership would have begun with the 2023–24 season. However, on February 2, 2022, JMU and the Sun Belt announced that JMU would join for all sports sponsored by the conference, including football, on July 1. On February 11, Southern Miss, Old Dominion, and Marshall announced that they too would join the Sun Belt Conference in 2022. However, CUSA had previously indicated on January 20 that it expected all three schools to remain in the league through 2022–23. ESPN journalist Adam Rittenberg cited an unnamed source regarding this development, "It's not going to be an amicable split. It's gotten ugly, and I assume it's going to get uglier." The source's prediction gained support when Marshall filed suit against CUSA in its local court in an attempt to force a 2022 move. On March 1, the Sun Belt released its 2022 football schedule with Marshall, Old Dominion, and Southern Miss included, making no mention of the ongoing legal dispute or the possibility that the three schools would not become members for the 2022–23 school year. By the end of that month, the three schools and CUSA reached a settlement that allowed the schools to join the Sun Belt in July 2022.

The increase in the SBC football membership led to reports that the conference's two non-football members, Little Rock and UT Arlington, would leave the conference; this eventually happened, with Little Rock joining the Ohio Valley Conference and UT Arlington rejoining the Western Athletic Conference (WAC), a league in which it had been a member in the 2012–13 school year. A few years later, Little Rock announced it will also join the WAC (now rebranded as UAC), starting in 2026–27 season.

==== SEC-Big 12 Alliance in Men's Soccer moves to Sun Belt ====
These moves also led the SBC to reinstate men's soccer, a sport that it had dropped after the 2020–21 school year when a combination of COVID-19 impact and earlier realignment had left the conference with only three men's soccer programs, half of the number required for a D-I conference to maintain its automatic NCAA tournament bid. With three of the four incoming members (Marshall, Old Dominion, and James Madison) sponsoring men's soccer, SBC commissioner Keith Gill had announced in November 2021 that the sport would be reinstated in 2023–24. After the entry of those schools was pushed forward to July 2022, the SBC announced on April 6, 2022, that men's soccer would be reinstated for 2022–23. The three incoming members, plus existing full members Coastal Carolina, Georgia Southern, and Georgia State, were joined by the Southeastern Conference and Big 12 Conference members that sponsor the sport—Kentucky, South Carolina, and West Virginia. Later on, the Sun Belt also announced that future Big 12 member UCF would join as a men's soccer affiliate upon joining the Big 12 in 2023, effectively creating a "6-4" format of six Sun Belt schools and four schools from the non-sponsoring SEC or Big 12 conferences.

The reinstatement of SBC men's soccer left the future of men's soccer in CUSA and the Mid-American Conference in serious doubt, as the two Georgia schools and West Virginia had been MAC men's soccer members (West Virginia had, however, planned to move that sport to CUSA before the Sun Belt reinstated men's soccer), while Coastal Carolina, South Carolina, and Kentucky had been CUSA men's soccer members. This then left both leagues with only four members in the 2022 season. Additionally, CUSA was set to lose three of its four remaining programs for the following season, with Charlotte, Florida Atlantic, and UAB making their move to The American in 2023. This would leave CUSA with only two institutions that sponsor the sport in 2023: FIU and Liberty, the latter of whom would be joining CUSA that season. Due to this, The American decided to admit the existing four CUSA soccer programs to their own league, with all four competing as affiliates in 2022 and FIU continuing as an affiliate after the other schools became full members. For a time, Liberty was left without a conference for its own program, but it would join the newly formed Ohio Valley Conference (OVC) men's soccer league in time for the 2023 season. Meanwhile, the MAC was able to add Chicago State, which was departing from the Western Athletic Conference in all sports, as a men's soccer associate, bringing their own membership to 5. Chicago State ended up becoming an all-sports independent.

At the end of the 2022 season, the MAC discontinued men's soccer as a sponsored sport, having failed to find the sixth member needed to maintain its automatic bid to the NCAA tournament. Of the four full MAC members that sponsored men's soccer in the 2022 season, Bowling Green, Northern Illinois, and Western Michigan moved the sport to the Missouri Valley Conference, and Akron moved it to the Big East Conference. Chicago State eventually joined the newly established OVC men's soccer league.

==== Further changes ====
As noted in the Pac-12 section, Texas State was officially announced on June 30, 2025 as a new Pac-12 member effective in 2026–27. With TXST having flirted with a move to the MW in 2024, the SBC started evaluating candidates for a replacement at that time, and Louisiana Tech—which had been an SBC member from 1991 to 2001—emerged as the frontrunner. These discussions took center stage again following TXST's Pac-12 move, and the SBC presidents and chancellors met on July 10 to discuss inviting Louisiana Tech. While some leaders of schools in the conference's East Division (Note: Since the 2024 season, the SBC has been the only FBS conference to be split into football divisions.) pushed back on the invitation, in the end the proposed invitation to Louisiana Tech received approval from the required 10 of 13 members. The formal vote to invite Louisiana Tech followed on July 14. While full details of Tech's entry remained to be worked out, a 2026 entry date was expected.

When Louisiana Tech accepted the SBC invitation, it notified CUSA of its planned 2026 departure date. Three days later, CUSA pushed back, citing provisions of conference bylaws, but left the door open for a buyout. Despite several months of negotiations, no agreement was reached, which led the University of Louisiana System, whose membership includes established SBC members Louisiana and ULM as well as Louisiana Tech, to file suit against CUSA on Tech's behalf in the school's home of Lincoln Parish, Louisiana on March 5, 2026. In the following week, CUSA and the SBC released their 2026 football schedules, with Tech included in both, which at the time gave the Bulldogs 20 scheduled games (compared to the FBS limit of 12). This led the website FootballScoop to declare the dispute over the terms of Tech's CUSA departure to be "public, ugly, and also a little bit hilarious." In April, CUSA and Tech reached a buyout agreement that allowed Tech to leave for the SBC in July 2026.

That October, James Madison announced that it would leave the SBC no later than July 2028 for the American Conference, already home to two of its women's teams. This move was later accelerated to July 2027.

=== Conference USA ===
Having lost 6 of its 14 members to The American and 3 to the SBC, Conference USA was left with 5 members, short of the NCAA minimum of 6 and the FBS minimum of 8. On November 5, 2021, CUSA invited four schools: FBS independents Liberty and New Mexico State, who then respectively played non-football sports in the ASUN Conference and Western Athletic Conference; full ASUN member Jacksonville State; and full WAC member Sam Houston. All four schools began CUSA play with the 2023–24 season. Per NCAA rules, Jacksonville State and Sam Houston were to serve a two-year probationary period. Liberty and New Mexico State, as established FBS members, did not have to serve probationary periods.

Around the same time, reports surfaced that CUSA members Western Kentucky and Middle Tennessee were poised to join the Mid-American Conference (MAC). However, Middle Tennessee elected to remain in CUSA, and the MAC did not invite Western Kentucky after Middle Tennessee did not join.

In April 2022, it was announced that Dallas Baptist would be moving its baseball program from the Missouri Valley Conference to CUSA effective that July (with play starting in the 2023 season). While all other Dallas Baptist University teams compete in Division II, primarily in the Lone Star Conference, the baseball team competes in Division I. DBU is also the last D-II member playing D-I baseball.

On October 14, 2022, CUSA announced that another ASUN member, Kennesaw State, would start a transition to FBS after the 2022 football season and join CUSA in 2024.

CUSA announced on May 10, 2023 that it would add the women-only sport of bowling (Note: The NCAA sponsors bowling only for women. Men's college bowling is governed outside the NCAA by the United States Bowling Congress.) effective in 2023–24. The new bowling league was established by CUSA absorbing the Southland Bowling League (SBL), which the Southland Conference had created in 2015 as a separate single-sport league. Accordingly, CUSA inherited the SBL's automatic berth in the NCAA Bowling Championship. The eight SBL members, which included established CUSA member Louisiana Tech and new CUSA member Sam Houston, were joined by another new CUSA full member in Jacksonville State, which started a women's bowling program in 2023–24.

ESPN's Pete Thamel reported on November 27, 2023 that Delaware, a member of both sides of the CAA, was planning to transition from FCS to FBS in 2024 and join CUSA in 2025; CUSA officially announced this move the next day. Delaware was ineligible for the FCS playoffs in 2024; however, because of recent changes to bylaws of the all-sports CAA, it remained eligible for CAA championships and automatic NCAA tournament bids in non-football sports until actually leaving the conference. On May 10, 2024, CUSA poached another team from the FCS ranks, announcing that Missouri State, a member of the Missouri Valley Conference and the separate though closely related Missouri Valley Football Conference, would also join in 2025.

In October 2024, UTEP announced it would leave CUSA for the Mountain West Conference starting in 2026. UTEP was the oldest member of the conference, having joined the conference in 2005. On July 15, 2025, after weeks of speculation following Texas State's announcing their departure to the rebuilt Pac-12 in 2026, Louisiana Tech released a statement stating that they would leave for the Sun Belt by July 1, 2026. This would have the effect of dropping the total number of members of CUSA from 12 to 10 by 2026. Dallas Baptist baseball would follow Texas State to the reconfigured Pac-12.

=== Mountain West Conference ===
Multiple media reports indicated that San Diego State University, which had been heavily linked with the Pac-12 after the departure of UCLA and USC was announced, had sent a letter on June 13, 2023 to the MW stating it intended to leave the conference in 2024. The school had also reportedly asked the MW for a one-month extension of the June 30 withdrawal deadline, citing "unforeseen delays involving other collegiate athletic conferences beyond our control", likely a reference to the upcoming Pac-12 media deal that had yet to be finalized. This led to an exchange between the MW and SDSU, with university president Adela de la Torre indicating that the June 13 letter was not a formal resignation. The MW's exit fee with a year's notice is $16.5 million, which increases to $34 million with less than a year's notice—which explained SDSU's reported request for a one-month extension to the deadline. In addition to the Pac-12, SDSU has been seen as a potential Big 12 target. The MW responded with a letter to SDSU stating that it would not approve any extension, and also considered the June 13 letter to be an effective notice of withdrawal. The MW and SDSU reached a settlement the next month, with SDSU remaining a member.

Although not joining the conference, remaining Pac-12 members Oregon State and Washington State came to a scheduling agreement with MW schools in December 2023 where all MW football teams play one and/or the other, in a bid to rebuild the conference, starting in 2024. The agreement, however, was not renewed for 2025, leaving both the Beavers and Cougars as de facto independents following the season.

Washington State later announced it would become an MW affiliate in baseball and women's swimming & diving effective in 2024–25, while Oregon State would join the West Coast Conference as a full affiliate member.

During San Diego State's flirtation with the Pac-12, the MW announced it would begin sponsoring women's gymnastics in the 2023–24 season, with full conference members Air Force, Boise State, San Jose State, and Utah State participating. All had previously participated in the single-sport Mountain Rim Gymnastics Conference, which had also included BYU and Southern Utah. With BYU moving women's gymnastics to the Big 12 together with the bulk of its teams, and Southern Utah not being invited to MW women's gymnastics, Southern Utah was temporarily left without a gymnastics conference, but it would join the Mountain Pacific Sports Federation in September 2023.

On September 12, 2024, Boise State, Colorado State, Fresno State and San Diego State all announced their intentions on leaving the Mountain West and joining the Pac-12, starting in 2026.

On September 23, 2024, Utah State also accepted an offer to join the Pac-12 as its seventh member, starting in 2026, leaving the conference with 6 full members and 7 football members (with Hawaii as a football-only member). Not long after, UNLV and Air Force declined membership offers from the Pac-12 and AAC, respectively, and chose to stay in the Mountain West. An attempt from the Mountain West to invite Texas State also failed, and the Bobcats chose to remain in the Sun Belt, later showing interest in the Pac-12 instead.

Following speculation in the days prior, UTEP announced it would depart Conference USA in 2026 for the Mountain West on October 1, 2024. On October 14, Hawaii athletic director Craig Angelos confirmed outside reports that the school would upgrade to full MW membership in 2026. The MW officially announced this move the next day.

On November 1, 2024, the Mountain West Conference announced that Grand Canyon University, a non-football member of the Western Athletic Conference, would join the league no later than July 2026. Grand Canyon's 2024 announcement stated that it was reneging on a previously announced move to the West Coast Conference, and that if MW bylaws allowed, it would join that conference as early as the second quarter of 2025. On July 8, 2025, it was confirmed that Grand Canyon would officially join the MW one year ahead of schedule. On December 10, 2024, the MW announced that UC Davis would join from the Big West Conference in non-football sports. UC Davis football will remain in FCS as an affiliate of the Big Sky Conference.

During this time, Mid-American Conference member Northern Illinois University was increasingly speculated as a football-only target for the MW. This speculation proved correct, as NIU accepted such an invitation from the MW, with the acceptance reported on January 3, 2025. Following final approval by the school's governing board on January 7, NIU football will join the MW in 2026. It was reported that the MAC would not likely keep NIU as a non-football member, and the MW's invitation was for football only, given the school's geographic separation from the rest of the conference. With that in mind, NIU was reportedly seeking an all-sports affiliation, with speculated future homes being the non-football Horizon League (in which NIU had been a member from 1994 to 1997), Missouri Valley Conference, (Note: The Missouri Valley Football Conference is a separate entity from the MVC.) and Summit League, as well as the FCS Ohio Valley Conference. (Note: At the time, most OVC members played football in the OVC–Big South Football Association, but three then-current members (Little Rock, SIUE, and Southern Indiana) do not play football at all, and Morehead State plays football outside the OVC in the Pioneer Football League. The OVC–Big South alliance was folded into the OVC starting with the 2026 season.) Most industry sources believed that NIU would eventually join the Horizon, and multiple media outlets reported on February 24 that this was indeed the case, with the school's governing board set to vote on a Horizon League return on February 27. NIU applied to maintain MAC membership in two sports not sponsored by the Horizon—women's gymnastics and men's wrestling. The Horizon League move became official on the same day as the board's vote. NIU later announced that its two remaining sports not sponsored by the Horizon would join other conferences in 2026–27. Men's wrestling joined the Pac-12, and women's gymnastics also joined the MW.

The MW later announced that it would start sponsoring men's soccer and men's swimming & diving starting in 2026–27. Four of the six inaugural MW men's soccer teams were full conference members that had previously housed men's soccer in the WAC, namely Air Force, Grand Canyon, San Jose State, and UNLV. The other two were new full MW member UC Davis and new Big Sky member Utah Tech, which became an affiliate in both men's soccer and baseball. Men's swimming & diving, having been reinstated after having been dropped in 2011, initially featured new full MW member Hawaii and established MW members Air Force, Grand Canyon, UNLV, and Wyoming.

In February 2026, multiple media outlets reported that the MW was in serious discussions with 10-time FCS champion North Dakota State which could see the Bison join the conference as a football-only member as early as the 2026 season. On February 8, it was reported that a membership deal with a 2026 entry date had been reached, and the official announcement came the following day.

=== Mid-American Conference ===
The Mid-American Conference (MAC) entered the realignment cycle with the longest period of membership stability of any FBS conference, not having gained or lost a core member since Marshall left in 2005 to join CUSA. This changed on February 26, 2024, when The Athletic reported that the University of Massachusetts Amherst, more often known as UMass, was reported as having been approved for full MAC membership, starting in July 2025. The university was expected to finalize this move in the coming days, and MAC commissioner Jon Steinbrecher stated that the MAC would formally announce UMass' arrival on February 29, with a news conference on the UMass campus in the next week. The MAC announcement was made, with UMass making its own announcement that day in advance of its news conference.

UMass had been a football-only MAC member in the 2012–2015 seasons while otherwise being a member of the Atlantic 10 Conference (A-10). Eventual full membership in the MAC had been part of the affiliation contract, but UMass turned down full membership, choosing to become an FBS independent. In the months leading to the UMass invitation, the school had engaged with CUSA as well as the MAC, but opted for the MAC, which offered a more favorable geographic footprint and sponsored more of the school's sports. UMass requested to remain in the A-10 for men's lacrosse and women's rowing, neither of which was then sponsored by the MAC, though the A-10 was not expected to vote on this request before May 2024. The A-10 would later vote to keep UMass as a men's lacrosse affiliate; women's rowing was left without a conference home before the MAC added the sport for 2025–26. Men's ice hockey, a sport also not sponsored by the MAC, remains in Hockey East. With the MAC set to expand to 13 members for 2025–26, speculation about future additions immediately focused on Middle Tennessee and Western Kentucky, CUSA members which had been courted by the MAC earlier in the decade.

In April 2024, the Missouri Valley Conference announced it would sponsor men's swimming & diving in 2024–25 after an absence of more than 20 years, by absorbing the MAC's operations in that sport. At the time of announcement, five of the seven schools in MAC men's aquatics were full MVC members. The two full MAC members with men's swimming & diving teams, Ball State and Miami (OH), accordingly became MVC associates.

This was followed in July 2024 by the announcement that the MAC would add women's rowing as a sponsored sport in 2025–26, coinciding with the arrival of UMass. The MAC rowing league initially consists of full members Eastern Michigan, Toledo, and UMass, plus affiliates Delaware, High Point, and Temple.

The MAC would lose another member in 2026 with Northern Illinois' departure for MW football and the Horizon League for most other sports. With that as a backdrop, multiple media reports in February 2026 indicated that Sacramento State, at the time a member of the FCS Big Sky Conference but moving to the non-football Big West Conference that July, would join the MAC as a football-only member for the 2026 season. The MAC officially announced Sacramento State's arrival on February 16. Sacramento State would later add women's rowing to its MAC membership, also effective in 2026–27.

== FCS conferences affected ==
The Division I Football Championship Subdivision (FCS) also saw significant changes, most notably the beginning of football sponsorship by the Atlantic Sun Conference (ASUN); the return of football by the Western Athletic Conference (WAC), which previously sponsored football at the FBS level until the end of the 2012 season; and two football-only conference mergers, one involving the ASUN and WAC and the other involving the Big South Conference and Ohio Valley Conference (OVC). A third FCS change was the creation of a formal relationship between the Missouri Valley Football Conference and two non-football leagues, the Missouri Valley Conference (MVC) and Summit League. In 2026, the Western Athletic Conference rebranded as the United Athletic Conference, with the existing ASUN–WAC football alignment continuing within the rebranded all-sports conference. Also in 2026, the Big South–OVC football alliance was reincorporated into the OVC. Since 2021, eight FCS members have transitioned or are transitioning to FBS conferences.

=== Western Athletic Conference ===
On January 14, 2021, the Western Athletic Conference, which last sponsored football at the FBS level during the 2012 season, announced its intention to reinstate football as a conference-sponsored sport at the FCS level, as well as the addition of five new members to the conference in all sports. The new members announced included four Southland Conference members from Texas in Abilene Christian, Lamar, Sam Houston, and Stephen F. Austin, plus Southern Utah from the Big Sky Conference. Those five schools joined existing WAC members that joined the WAC in the previous year, Tarleton and Utah Tech (known as Dixie State before May 2022) (Note: While the school's legal name did not change until July 1, 2022, it began using "Utah Tech" as its forward-facing name that May.) to make up the WAC's initial football membership. The four Southland schools were initially planned to join the WAC for the 2022–23 school year, but the WAC pushed their entry forward to 2021–22 after the Southland expelled all four schools. Southern Utah joined on its originally planned schedule of 2022–23, with SUU and the Big Sky agreeing to honor their scheduling commitments for 2021–22.

That same day, WAC non-football member UTRGV announced that it would begin sponsoring football no later than the 2024 season, while the WAC announced that Chicago State, a geographical outlier for much of its time in the WAC, would depart the conference on July 1, 2022. UTRGV would later announce that it would play an exhibition football schedule in 2024 before starting full varsity play in 2025. However, on March 25, 2024, UTRGV announced it would move its athletic program, including football, from the WAC to the Southland Conference (SLC) in 2024–25 before playing a single game in the alliance.

On November 12, the WAC announced it would add SLC member Incarnate Word for the 2022–23 season. Though fellow SLC member McNeese was rumored to be joining the WAC along with Incarnate Word, it instead chose to remain in the Southland. On January 21, 2022, the WAC added Sun Belt Conference member UT Arlington, which had joined and left the WAC in the early-2010s realignment cycle, for the 2022–23 season.

On April 8, Lamar University announced that it would rejoin the SLC for 2023–24, spending only two years in the WAC. On July 11, Lamar's transition was moved up to the 2022–23 season.

The WAC and ASUN Conference jointly announced on May 18 that they would renew their football partnership, which was originally intended to operate only in the 2021 season. Each conference had planned to have 6 members that were eligible for the FCS playoffs in the 2022 season, but the start of FBS transitions by outgoing ASUN member Jacksonville State and outgoing WAC member Sam Houston rendered both ineligible for the 2022 playoffs.

On June 24, 2022, one week before it was scheduled to join the WAC, Incarnate Word announced that it would instead remain in the SLC. Along with the departures of New Mexico State and Sam Houston to Conference USA and Lamar back to the Southland, the WAC had 11 members going forward, 6 of which were to play football in the conference.

ESPN reported on December 9, 2022 that the WAC and ASUN had agreed to form a new football-only conference that plans to start play in 2024. The initial football membership would consist of Austin Peay, Central Arkansas, Eastern Kentucky, and North Alabama from the ASUN, and Abilene Christian, Southern Utah, Stephen F. Austin, Tarleton, and Utah Tech from the WAC. At the time, UTRGV would have become the 10th member upon its planned addition of football in 2025, but it would later announce its 2024 departure for the SLC. This announcement came after West Georgia was unveiled as a new member of both the ASUN and the new conference, effective in 2024. The new football conference also reportedly planned to move "from what is currently known as FCS football to what is currently known as FBS football at the earliest practicable date." The two conferences made this official on December 20, announcing that they would operate a single football league, tentatively known as the ASUN–WAC Football Conference, starting in 2023. Because of prior scheduling commitments, the football league played a six-game schedule in the 2023 season before a planned move to a full round-robin in 2024. This announcement did not mention a potential move to FBS. The new football league was officially rebranded as the United Athletic Conference (UAC) on April 17, 2023.

On May 10, 2024, the WAC suffered another blow when two non-football full members, Grand Canyon and Seattle, announced that they would move to the West Coast Conference in July 2025. Less than a week later, multiple media reports indicated that Stephen F. Austin would soon leave the WAC in July 2024 to return to the SLC. The move was officially announced on May 29.

That September, the Big West Conference announced that outgoing WAC members Grand Canyon and Seattle, as well as full WCC member and Mountain Pacific Sports Federation (MPSF) women's swimming & diving member San Diego, would become Big West swimming & diving affiliates after the 2024–25 season. Grand Canyon and Seattle have men's and women's teams, while San Diego has only a women's team. This led to rumors that the WAC would drop men's and women's swimming & diving after the that season. These rumors gained credence when the MPSF, a multi-sports conference that sponsors a wide array of non-revenue sports but not football or basketball, announced on February 13, 2025, that it would add seven swim/dive members from the WAC in 2025–26. Full WAC member California Baptist moved its men's and women's teams to the MPSF. The other arrivals—full WAC member Utah Tech and WAC affiliates Idaho, New Mexico State, Northern Arizona, Northern Colorado, and UTRGV—sponsor only the women's sport.

Later that month, reports emerged that the Big West, set to lose Hawaii and UC Davis to the Mountain West Conference in 2026, was to vote February 28 on the possible addition of two WAC members—California Baptist and Utah Valley. By early June, both were announced as new Big West members effective in 2026—California Baptist on March 19 and Utah Valley on June 4. The process of adding Utah Valley was slowed down by several factors. The university president was on bereavement leave for part of spring 2025; several other conferences had at least some interest in adding the school; and Utah Valley wanted to limit the number of key Sunday games it would host (despite being a public school, a large part of its fanbase consists of LDS Church members).

If no new members had joined, the WAC would have been reduced to five members, two shy of the number required to maintain its all-sports status. According to journalist Matt Brown, the WAC had no plans to add any Division II upgraders, and industry sources believed that attempts to recruit more D-I members would be unsuccessful. Brown added, "The most likely outcome, at this point, is that the remaining five institutions find new conference homes and everybody huddles up with the lawyers to figure out how the remaining league assets are split up." He noted that the three remaining Texas members (Abilene Christian, Tarleton State, UT Arlington) had reportedly been candidates for multiple conferences. The remaining Utah schools (Southern Utah, Utah Tech) were not seen as likely candidates for any regional league. However, the two Utah schools would eventually join the Big Sky Conference.

This scenario changed on June 26, 2025, when the Atlantic Sun Conference (ASUN) and the Western Athletic Conference (WAC) jointly announced a major reorganization to take effect in 2026. Under the agreement, the WAC rebranded as the United Athletic Conference (UAC) and continued operations as an NCAA Division I all-sports league, while the ASUN and UAC now operate in partnership under an all-sports consortium model, with the consortium later revealed as Unisun Sports. The full membership of the rebranded UAC includes seven institutions that had competed in UAC football—Abilene Christian, Austin Peay, Central Arkansas, Eastern Kentucky, North Alabama, Tarleton State, and West Georgia—along with non-football UT Arlington and incoming member Little Rock, which would leave the Ohio Valley Conference to join the UAC beginning with the 2026–27 academic year. At the time, the reconfigured ASUN would consist of institutions that do not sponsor scholarship FCS football, including Florida Gulf Coast, Jacksonville, Lipscomb, North Florida, and Queens, along with non-scholarship FCS member Stetson and Bellarmine, which sponsors the non-NCAA variant of sprint football. The ASUN later added Division II upgrader West Florida for 2026–27 as its only scholarship FCS program (see below).

=== ASUN/Atlantic Sun Conference ===
On January 29, 2021, the ASUN Conference (which would revert to its previous branding as the Atlantic Sun Conference in 2023) (Note: The conference still uses "ASUN" as its official abbreviation.) announced that it too would begin sponsoring football at the FCS level beginning in 2022–23, as well as announcing three new members for the 2021–22 season: Jacksonville State and Eastern Kentucky from the Ohio Valley Conference, and Central Arkansas from the Southland Conference. Those three schools plus existing ASUN members Kennesaw State and North Alabama, which had been playing football in the Big South Conference, would make up the first five ASUN football members, with a requisite sixth member to be announced at a later date. For the 2021 football season, the ASUN and WAC formed a football-only partnership, with the three new ASUN members competing alongside WAC members for an automatic bid to the FCS playoffs.

On September 17, that sixth football member was revealed to be Austin Peay, which would join the conference for 2022–23. Though the ASUN had the requisite 6 football members for the 2022 season, the impending departures of Jacksonville State in 2023 and Kennesaw State in 2024 necessitated replacement football members to meet the conference minimum. No such member had been announced. ASUN full member Stetson plays football in the Pioneer Football League, a conference for Division I FCS schools that do not offer football scholarships. Another full member, Bellarmine, added football in 2022 but plays sprint football, a non-NCAA variant played under standard NCAA rules but with player weights limited to 183 pounds (83 kg).

Shortly before Peay was announced as an incoming member, media reports indicated that the ASUN had approached at least five Division II members regarding possible membership—football-sponsoring Valdosta State, West Florida, and West Georgia and non-football Lincoln Memorial and Queens (NC). (Note: Representing Queens University of Charlotte, and not to be confused with Queens College in New York City, which remains in D-II.) On May 7, 2022, Queens, from the D-II South Atlantic Conference, announced that it would move up to Division I and join the ASUN Conference beginning with the 2022–23 season. The ASUN made this move official three days later.

On May 18, the ASUN and WAC announced that they had renewed their 2021 football partnership for the 2022 season. That October, Kennesaw State announced its 2024 departure for Conference USA. This was followed in December 2022 by the two conferences announcing their football-only merger. On September 8, 2023, the ASUN announced that West Georgia would join both the ASUN and UAC in 2024.

On August 28, the ASUN announced that it would begin sponsoring men's and women's swimming & diving effective immediately, taking most of its initial membership from the Coastal Collegiate Sports Association (CCSA), which had originally been founded as a partnership between the ASUN and several other conferences to provide a home for those conferences' swimming & diving programs. Four full ASUN members moved swimming & diving from the CCSA—Bellarmine and Queens for both men and women, and Florida Gulf Coast and North Florida for women only. Four other CCSA members became ASUN associates. Gardner–Webb moved both its men's and women's teams; Old Dominion moved its men's team, and Liberty (a former full ASUN member) and UNC Asheville, neither of which sponsors a men's team, moved their women's teams. The new ASUN men's league also took two members from The American, which dropped men's swimming & diving after the 2022–23 season—established American member SMU and incoming American member Florida Atlantic. SMU would only be an ASUN swimming & diving member for 2023–24 due to its move to the ACC, which sponsors that sport for both sexes. The CCSA, which had previously expanded its scope to include beach volleyball, was left sponsoring only that sport. Its four remaining beach volleyball teams initially announced that they would join the Mountain Pacific Sports Federation for 2025–26 and beyond, but two of these schools, Florida State and South Carolina, instead became Big 12 Conference associates in that sport.

On April 2, 2026, the ASUN announced that West Florida would start a transition to D-I in July 2026 as a new member of that conference, and also join the UAC as a football-only member. It became the only scholarship FCS program in the post-2026 ASUN.

As noted above, the ASUN and WAC implemented an all-sports alignment in 2026, with the WAC continuing operations under the United Athletic Conference name and adding ASUN scholarship FCS programs, apart from West Florida, as full members.

=== Southland Conference ===
With much of the Southland Conference's (SLC) football membership leaving for the WAC and ASUN (Abilene Christian, Lamar, Sam Houston, Stephen F. Austin and Central Arkansas), on September 28, 2021, the Southland announced that Division II school Texas A&M–Commerce (renamed East Texas A&M in 2024) would move up from the D-II Lone Star Conference to Division I and join the conference beginning with the 2022–23 season. At the time, this left the Southland with 8 full members, 6 of which play football.

Shortly after A&M–Commerce was announced as an incoming member, the Southland and Ohio Valley Conference, which had lost three football-sponsoring schools in this realignment cycle (and would later lose a fourth), announced a football scheduling alliance for the 2022 and 2023 seasons.

On November 12, 2021, the WAC announced it would add SLC member Incarnate Word for the 2022–23 season. Though fellow SLC member McNeese was rumored to be joining the WAC along with Incarnate Word, it instead chose to remain in the Southland.

On April 8, 2022, Lamar University announced that it would rejoin the Southland Conference for 2023–24, spending only two years in the WAC before rejoining a conference where it had been a member from 1963 to 1987 and again from 1999 to 2021. On July 11, Lamar announced that it would instead move to the SLC in time for the 2022–23 season.

On June 24, 2022, Incarnate Word announced that instead of joining the WAC on July 1 as previously planned, it would remain in the SLC.

During this cycle, the SLC expanded its affiliate membership far beyond its primary post-2021 footprint of Louisiana and Texas. Nine schools in all joined, with six from East Coast states and single schools from California, Idaho, and Illinois. First, on June 22, 2021, the SLC announced that NJIT would join in men's and women's tennis effective that July. Two days later, the SLC added four schools for golf, also for 2021–22—Francis Marion, a Division II member that plays D-I men's golf, in that sport; Delaware State and Maryland Eastern Shore in women's golf; and Augusta, a D-II member that fields D-I teams in men's and women's golf, in both. In June 2022, the SLC added two more schools as affiliates effective the next month, with Boise State joining in beach volleyball and Bryant joining for men's & women's golf and tennis. However, it would lose two of those new affiliates in 2022–23 when Delaware State and Maryland Eastern Shore moved women's golf to the more geographically appropriate Northeast Conference (NEC) after that conference entered into a partnership with those schools' full-time home of the Mid-Eastern Athletic Conference in baseball and men's and women's golf. Shortly after the MEAC–NEC announcement, the SLC gained a men's tennis affiliate in UIC, whose new home of the Missouri Valley Conference sponsors tennis only for women. Also, San Jose State joined for beach volleyball, uniting it with Boise State, the only other Mountain West Conference member sponsoring that sport. UIC men's tennis spent only one season in the SLC, moving to the Mid-American Conference after the 2022–23 season. Francis Marion would leave SLC men's golf after the 2024–25 season to join the reinstated men's golf league of the Big Sky Conference, and Boise State and San Jose State beach volleyball both left at that time, respectively for the Big 12 and MPSF.

As noted previously, the Southland Bowling League, a bowling-only conference that had been supported by the SLC, was merged into Conference USA after the 2022–23 season.

On March 25, 2024, the SLC expanded again with the announcement that the University of Texas Rio Grande Valley would join the conference effective in July 2024, joining from the WAC. A little more than two months later, Stephen F. Austin announced its return to the SLC on the same schedule.

=== Ohio Valley Conference ===
In addition to three Ohio Valley Conference (OVC) football members joining the ASUN, two additional OVC members announced their intent to leave the conference. On September 28, 2021, non-football member Belmont announced it would join the Missouri Valley Conference (MVC) for the 2022–23 season. On January 7, 2022, Murray State announced that it too would join the MVC for 2022–23. Though the MVC does not sponsor football, Murray State applied to (and eventually joined) the Missouri Valley Football Conference (a separate entity from the Missouri Valley Conference) starting with the 2023 season. At the time of this announcement, the expected 2023 departure of Murray State football would have left the Ohio Valley Conference with 5 football members. (Full OVC member Morehead State plays non-scholarship football in the Pioneer Football League.)

On December 9, 2021, Sun Belt Conference non-football member Little Rock was announced as the newest OVC member starting with the 2022–23 season. Following this, reports began to surface that the OVC had anticipated Murray State leaving, and had actively been exploring other options for expansion, with current D-I FCS schools Arkansas-Pine Bluff of the Southwestern Athletic Conference and Western Illinois of the Summit League, as well as D-II schools Southern Indiana, Hillsdale, Grand Valley State, and Lincoln Memorial, all being named as potential candidates. Exactly two months after Little Rock joined, on February 9, 2022, it was confirmed that Southern Indiana, a non-football sponsoring member from the D-II Great Lakes Valley Conference (GLVC), would begin the process of reclassifying to D-I and would join the OVC in July 2022. Later that same month, on February 23, another GLVC member, the football-sponsoring Lindenwood, was announced as a July 2022 entry.

The day before the Lindenwood announcement saw a major change to the FCS landscape when the OVC and Big South Conference announced their plans to merge their respective football leagues effective in 2023. Certain major details of the alliance—specifically, whether it would be operated by the Big South or OVC, or become a completely separate entity—were not revealed at the time. The alliance was eventually unveiled as the Big South–OVC Football Association, later changed to the final branding of OVC–Big South Football Association. The partnership was officially classified as "an association of their [i.e., the two conferences'] football member institutions" instead of a full-fledged conference (similar to the football arrangement between the ASUN Conference and Western Athletic Conference before the creation of the football-only United Athletic Conference).

On July 6, 2022, the OVC and Horizon League announced their plans to merge their respective men's tennis leagues effective immediately. OVC members that sponsor the sport now compete as affiliate members under the banner of the Horizon League men's tennis championship. The expanded Horizon men's tennis league also includes Belmont, which had officially left the OVC for the MVC days earlier.

The OVC announced on March 28, 2023 that it would add men's soccer as a sponsored sport effective with the upcoming 2023 season. Full members Eastern Illinois, Lindenwood, SIUE, and Southern Indiana were joined by affiliates Chicago State, Houston Christian, Incarnate Word, and Liberty. Chicago State played in OVC men's soccer only in 2023, as it joined the Northeast Conference, which sponsors the sport, in 2024. In 2026, Liberty moved men's soccer to the Southern Conference, while OVC men's soccer added a third Texas member in UTRGV.

On May 12, 2023, the OVC announced that Western Illinois, which had reportedly been considered for membership in 2021, would become a full member effective that July. Western Illinois football played the 2023 season in the Missouri Valley Football Conference before becoming part of the Big South–OVC alliance in 2024. It would also keep men's soccer in the Summit League through the 2023 season, keeping that league at the 6 members needed to maintain the Summit's automatic bid to the NCAA tournament. (Note: Once a conference drops below the required level of sponsorship to qualify for an automatic bid in a given sport, it has a two-year grace period before it loses that bid. With WIU men's soccer staying in the Summit League through 2023–24, that conference had until 2026–27 to restore its men's soccer membership to the required level. The Summit would return to seven men's soccer members in 2025 with the arrival of Delaware and UMass as associate members.)

On August 13, 2025, the Southern Conference (SoCon) announced that football-sponsoring OVC member Tennessee Tech would join the SoCon in 2026. Shortly after, Little Rock announced that it would also leave the OVC, with the UAC as its destination, starting in the 2026-27 season.

Most recently, the OVC and Big South agreed to reincorporate their football alliance into the OVC, with the announcement being made on June 18, 2026. The two Big South schools that had participated in the alliance in the 2025 season, Charleston Southern and Gardner–Webb, became OVC football affiliates.

=== Colonial/Coastal Athletic Association ===
The departure of James Madison left the Colonial Athletic Association (CAA), renamed in 2023 to the Coastal Athletic Association, with 9 all-sports members, with 11 schools participating in the technically separate entity of CAA Football. On January 18, 2022, NJ.com reported that Monmouth, a full member of the Metro Atlantic Athletic Conference and football-only member of the Big South Conference, would join both sides of the CAA starting in 2022–23. They also reported Big South full member Hampton and America East Conference member Stony Brook would probably join the CAA. Hampton had been working toward an eventual CAA invitation since at least 1995, and Stony Brook had been a member of CAA Football since 2013. On January 25, all three schools were officially announced as new members of the all-sports CAA for 2022–23, with Hampton and Monmouth also joining CAA Football.

On February 18, 2022, North Carolina A&T received approval from its board of trustees to move from the Big South to the CAA, and the CAA officially announced A&T's move on February 22. While A&T joined the all-sports CAA for the 2022–23 season, it did not join CAA Football until the 2023 season.

On August 3, 2022, Campbell announced that it too would leave the Big South for both sides of the CAA beginning with the 2023–24 academic year. A year later, CAA Football announced that Bryant would become that league's 16th member in 2024. Later in 2023, Delaware announced its departure for Conference USA effective in 2025. On May 14, 2024, Richmond, otherwise a member of the non-football Atlantic 10 Conference, announced it would leave CAA Football in 2025 for football membership in the Patriot League, where its women's golf team had played before the A-10 began sponsoring that sport in 2024–25.

Two other schools later announced they would leave CAA Football for the Patriot League in 2026. William & Mary announced on April 25 it would join its in-state rival Richmond in Patriot League football, while remaining a member of the all-sports CAA. Villanova, otherwise a Big East Conference member, announced its move on June 5. CAA Football later announced on July 22 that Sacred Heart, which had become an FCS independent after the university left the Northeast Conference for the non-football Metro Atlantic Athletic Conference in 2024, would join in 2026 while remaining a MAAC member.

On June 26, 2026, the CAA announced that Fairfield, a non-football school which had been a CAA member in men's lacrosse since 2014 and added field hockey to its CAA membership in 2026, would become a full member in 2027.

=== Big South Conference ===
On February 7, 2020, North Carolina A&T State University announced it would join Big South from the MEAC as a full member, including football, starting in 2021–22.

On January 25, 2022, the Colonial Athletic Association announced that Big South Conference full member Hampton and football-only member Monmouth would join both sides of the CAA for the 2022–23 season. On February 22, the CAA announced that North Carolina A&T would join the all-sports CAA in 2022–23 and CAA Football a year later. These departures, along with football-only members Kennesaw State and North Alabama leaving to play in the ASUN Conference, at the time brought the Big South membership down to 10 full members and 5 football members, the latter being one short of the conference minimum. (Big South full member Presbyterian plays non-scholarship football in the Pioneer Football League.) On March 29, 2022, the football membership was restored to 6 with the announcement that Bryant would join as a football-only member effective with the 2022 season, but A&T's 2023 departure for CAA Football would again reduce the football membership to 5. On August 3, 2022, the Big South lost another football member as Campbell announced that it would join both sides of the CAA for the 2023–24 academic year, followed on August 10, 2023, by Bryant announcing its own move to CAA Football for 2024–25, and then on November 28 by Robert Morris announcing it would return to its former full-time home of the Northeast Conference as a football associate.

As noted previously, the Big South and OVC effectively merged their football leagues in 2023, with the merged football league being reincorporated into the OVC in 2026.

=== Big Sky Conference ===
Southern Utah left the Big Sky Conference for the WAC on July 1, 2022. Southern Utah's departure left the Big Sky with 10 full members, all of which sponsor football, with Cal Poly and UC Davis as football-only members.

On June 18, 2025, Sacramento State announced it would leave the Big Sky for the non-football Big West Conference effective in 2026. At the time, Sacramento State was attempting to start a transition from FCS to FBS despite not having an invitation from an FBS conference. One week later on June 25, the Big Sky announced that it would add Southern Utah and Utah Tech, the two Utah schools that would be left behind in the ASUN/WAC reorganization, effective in 2026. Sacramento State would eventually receive a football-only invitation from the Mid-American Conference effective with the 2026 season.

=== Northeast Conference/NEC ===
On March 29, 2022, Bryant announced that it would leave the Northeast Conference (NEC) that July, with most sports joining the America East Conference and football joining the Big South. On April 5, the NEC responded by adding Stonehill College for 2022–23, a football-sponsoring Division II institution from the Northeast-10 Conference.

ESPN reported on April 27 that Mount St. Mary's, a full NEC member without a football program, was in the process of a move to the Metro Atlantic Athletic Conference (MAAC; now known as the Metro Conference), where it would join several other basketball-focused private schools. The conference change was officially announced on May 2, 2022, effective that July.

During this realignment, the NEC also announced that it would begin sponsoring men's volleyball in the 2023 season (2022–23 school year) with six teams. The NEC became the second D-I all-sports conference to sponsor the sport, after the Big West Conference. Before the 2022 season, only three NEC members (Sacred Heart, St. Francis Brooklyn, and Saint Francis (PA)) had men's volleyball programs, all competing in the single-sport Eastern Intercollegiate Volleyball Association (EIVA). In the 2022 season, two more full NEC members, Fairleigh Dickinson and LIU, began sponsoring men's volleyball, competing as independents. When announcing its new men's volleyball league, the NEC announced that Merrimack, an all-sports member transitioning from Division II, would launch a men's volleyball program and become the sixth member, thereby reaching the required membership level for an eventual automatic bid to the combined D-I and D-II championship. The EIVA retained six members, maintaining its automatic bid. The NEC eventually added two Division II schools, (Note: The NCAA's top-level championship in men's volleyball is open to both D-I and D-II members, and before the House v. NCAA settlement took full effect in 2025–26, scholarship limits were the same across both divisions. In the post-House era, Division I scholarship limits have been replaced by roster limits.) Daemen and D'Youville, as associate members for its first men's volleyball season. (Note: At the time of announcement, Daemen was a full D-II member, while D'Youville was shortly to enter the final year of its three-year transition from NCAA Division III.)

On May 9, 2022, NEC commissioner Noreen Morris indicated in a Twitter post that the NEC would not sponsor men's lacrosse after the 2021–22 school year. The conference had already lost full members Bryant and Mount St. Mary's, and the impending addition of men's lacrosse by the Atlantic 10 Conference (A-10), confirmed later that month, took away both NEC men's lacrosse affiliates (Hobart and Saint Joseph's). Three of the remaining four NEC men's lacrosse schools, full conference members LIU, Sacred Heart, and Wagner, would be taken in by the MAAC as affiliate members. According to Morris, the fourth, Merrimack, was in membership discussion with multiple lacrosse-sponsoring conferences; it eventually joined the America East Conference for that sport effective with the 2023 season (2022–23 school year).

On July 12, 2022, the NEC and Mid-Eastern Athletic Conference (MEAC) entered into a partnership for baseball and golf, under whose terms all MEAC members that sponsored baseball, men's golf, and women's golf became NEC associate members effective immediately. This marked the end of the MEAC baseball league, which had been reduced to four members due to earlier realignment. Howard, already an NEC associate in six sports, added men's golf to its NEC membership. Coppin State and Norfolk State joined for baseball; Delaware State joined for baseball and women's golf; North Carolina Central joined in men's and women's golf; and Maryland Eastern Shore joined in all three sports. Several months later, the NEC announced that Delaware State would add women's lacrosse and women's soccer to its NEC membership in 2023–24.

St. Francis Brooklyn, which had been a full non-football NEC member since the league's founding in 1981, announced on March 20, 2023, that it was eliminating its athletic program at the end of the 2022–23 school year. Less than two months later, the NEC announced that non-football Division II upgrader Le Moyne would replace St. Francis Brooklyn effective in 2023–24.

On October 23, 2023, the MAAC announced that Merrimack and Sacred Heart would leave the NEC for that conference after the 2023–24 school year. This announcement came less than two weeks after the NEC had announced that it would reinstate men's lacrosse effective with the 2025 season (2024–25 school year), with both departing schools having been announced as new men's lacrosse members. The other announced members were full NEC members Le Moyne, LIU, and Wagner, plus new associates Detroit Mercy and VMI. The NEC announced on November 7 that it would add Cleveland State and former full member Robert Morris as men's lacrosse associates for the 2025 season. This was soon followed by the announcement that Robert Morris would return to NEC football in 2024, and then by the announcement that Chicago State would end its two-year stint as an all-sports independent and join the NEC in 2024. Chicago State joined for all sports except men's and women's tennis, which moved to the NEC once the school's affiliation contract with the Horizon League expired after the 2024–25 season. The MEAC women's golf associates would eventually leave after the 2025–26 season when that conference announced it would sponsor women's golf, though all of those schools continue to house at least one other sport in the NEC.

Further changes came in early April 2024. First, on April 1, Sacred Heart announced it would leave the NEC men's volleyball league after the spring 2024 season to return to the EIVA. Three days later, football-sponsoring Mercyhurst University announced it would transition from the Division II PSAC and join the NEC, bringing the league back to 9 members for the 2024–25 season.

Chicago State had been expected to add FCS football in the 2026 season. In September 2023, the school began a fundraising campaign to expand its sports offerings, including the potential addition of football. On February 11, 2025, CSU announced it had begun a search for its first head football coach, and hired Bobby Rome II that April. CSU ultimately announced that football would indeed start play in 2026, playing its first season as an FCS independent before joining NEC football in 2027.

The month after CSU announced its head coaching search, Saint Francis University (not to be confused with former NEC member St. Francis Brooklyn) announced it would leave the NEC in 2026 to reclassify to NCAA Division III, joining the Presidents' Athletic Conference. In early May 2025, the NEC announced the arrival of another Division II upgrader, the University of New Haven, effective that July. In fall 2026, the conference would lose two more members to the Metro Conference, effective in July 2027. Le Moyne announced its departure in October, and Stonehill announced its move in November.

In a change not directly related to realignment, the conference changed its official name to its longstanding initialism of NEC on October 2, 2025.

=== Missouri Valley Football Conference ===
On April 4, 2022, the Missouri Valley Football Conference announced that Murray State's football team would join the conference beginning with the 2023 season. The move was made as a result of Murray State's previously announced move of its other sports from the Ohio Valley Conference (OVC) to the Missouri Valley Conference (MVC), a separate entity from the MVFC that does not sponsor football.

The MVFC would eventually lose Western Illinois, which left the non-football Summit League for the OVC in 2023. The football team played the 2023 season in the MVFC before leaving for the Big South–OVC football alliance in 2024. It lost a second member in 2025 when Missouri State left for CUSA.

On May 5, 2025, the MVFC announced a new conference structure that formalized the decades-long unofficial ties between the MVFC and MVC, and also established a formal relationship between the MVFC and Summit League. Under the new structure, the commissioners of the MVC and Summit hold the top two positions in the MVFC, and both conferences share administrative duties. Of the 10 MVFC members in the 2025 football season, all but one are members of the two partner conferences.

On February 8, 2026, it was reported that North Dakota State accepted an invitation to join the Mountain West Conference beginning with the 2026 college football season. The MW officially announced the move the next day.

=== Southern Conference ===
While the Southern Conference (SoCon) had no change to its full membership until the 2026 arrival of Tennessee Tech, the addition of men's lacrosse by the Atlantic 10 Conference led to the SoCon disbanding its men's lacrosse league after the 2022 season. The SoCon had sponsored men's lacrosse since the 2015 season, when it took over operational control of the ASUN men's lacrosse league. As part of an agreement with the SoCon, the ASUN reestablished men's lacrosse for the 2022 season, with full member Bellarmine joined by five new single-sport members, while another full ASUN member, Jacksonville, stayed in SoCon men's lacrosse with a mixture of full SoCon members and affiliates.

With Hampton moving to the CAA and affiliates High Point and Richmond (the latter a full A-10 member) moving the sport to the A-10, the SoCon was left with only three men's lacrosse members, with six required to maintain its automatic bid to the NCAA tournament. Accordingly, Jacksonville and full SoCon member Mercer moved that sport to the ASUN, while VMI, also a full SoCon member, returned to its former men's lacrosse home of the Metro Atlantic Athletic Conference, now known as the Metro Conference.

=== Ivy League ===
Since its formal founding in 1954, the Ivy League has never had a membership change, and this realignment cycle has been no exception. However, the Ivies announced a significant change in men's wrestling in December 2023.

The Eastern Intercollegiate Wrestling Association (EIWA) had been founded in 1904, with competition starting the next year, by four Ivy schools (Columbia, Penn, Princeton, Yale; all but Yale were members in 2023–24). Over time, the EIWA would expand beyond the Ivies to include many other programs in the northeastern U.S. Through 2023–24, all Ivy League members that sponsored varsity men's wrestling competed in the EIWA. While Ivy champions were extrapolated from results of dual meets between Ivy members, the Ivies competed for NCAA tournament berths as part of the EIWA. On December 19, 2023, the Ivy League announced it would launch its own conference championship meet starting in the 2024–25 season, ending its relationship of more than a century with the EIWA. With six members, the Ivies gained their own automatic NCAA tournament bid for the first time. The EIWA retained 11 members and its own automatic bid.

=== Patriot League ===
Like the Ivy League, the Patriot League has seen no change to its core membership in this cycle. However, the conference's football league added a member in 2025 with the arrival of Richmond, which was a Patriot League member in women's golf before Richmond's primary conference, the A-10, started sponsoring that sport in 2024–25. The Spiders became the first new member of Patriot League football since the arrival of Georgetown in 2001, and the Spiders' entry was the first change in Patriot League football membership since Towson left in 2004. A year later, Villanova and William & Mary joined as football associates.

=== Mid-Eastern Athletic Conference ===
On February 7, 2020, North Carolina A&T State University announced it would leave the MEAC to join the Big South as a full member, including football, starting in 2021–22. Shortly thereafter, Bethune–Cookman and Florida A&M also announced they would leave the MEAC to join the SWAC.

On July 12, 2022, the Mid-Eastern Athletic Conference (MEAC) and the NEC entered into a partnership for baseball and golf, under whose terms all MEAC members that sponsored baseball, men's golf, and women's golf became NEC associate members effective immediately. This marked the end of the MEAC baseball league, which had been reduced to four members due to earlier realignment. Howard, already an NEC associate in six sports, added men's golf to its NEC membership. Coppin State and Norfolk State joined for baseball; Delaware State joined for baseball and women's golf; North Carolina Central joined in men's and women's golf; and Maryland Eastern Shore joined in all three sports. The women's golf partnership was dissolved when the MEAC began sponsoring that sport in 2026–27, but all schools affected by this development remain NEC associates in at least one other sport.

At the same time the MEAC announced the addition of women's golf, it announced that it would also start sponsoring women's flag football in 2026–27. The MEAC became the first Division I conference to sponsor that sport. Flag football is currently part of the NCAA Emerging Sports for Women program, but is expected to become an official NCAA championship sport in 2027–28. The MEAC would announce that the four full members that committed to play in the first season would be joined by associates Gardner–Webb and Mississippi Valley State.

=== Southwestern Athletic Conference ===
As already noted, Florida A&M and Bethune-Cookman joined from the MEAC as full-members in 2021–22.

=== Pioneer Football League ===
On November 19, 2017, Presbyterian College, a Big South full member, announced it would be moving its football program to the non-scholarship Pioneer Football League starting in 2021–22. Presbyterian's last Big South football season was in 2019; the Blue Hose competed the 2020 season as an independent before joining the Pioneer League for 2021 and beyond. The Blue Hose remain a member of the Big South in all other sports.

The University of St. Thomas, after moving up from Division III to Division I in 2021, joined the Pioneer Football League since its new home of the Summit League did not sponsor football.

== Non-football Division I conferences affected ==
=== America East Conference ===
On May 6, 2021, America East Conference (AmEast) member Hartford's governing board voted to begin the process of transitioning the school's athletic program from Division I to Division III. The plan calls for the following steps:

- January 2022: Formal request for reclassification with the NCAA.
- 2022–23: No athletic scholarships will be awarded to incoming students.
- 2023–24: Become a provisional member in a D-III conference to be determined; transition remaining students off athletic scholarships by the end of that school year.
- 2024–25: Become a full member of the aforementioned D-III conference.
- 2025–26: Full D-III membership.

Hartford left the AmEast on July 1, 2022, competing as a Division I independent in 2022–23 before joining its new D-III home of the Commonwealth Coast Conference (CCC; now known as the Conference of New England) in 2023, with the CCC announcing Hartford's arrival on June 21, 2022.

On January 25, Stony Brook was announced as a full member of the Colonial Athletic Association (now known as Coastal Athletic Association) starting in 2022–23. The school has been a member of CAA Football since 2013.

A little more than two months later on March 29, Bryant was announced as a new member of the America East Conference starting in 2022–23. As noted earlier, Bryant football joined the Big South Conference at that time, became part of the Big South–OVC football alliance in 2023, and joined CAA Football in 2024.

=== Atlantic 10 Conference ===
On November 16, 2021, the Atlantic 10 Conference (A-10) announced that Loyola Chicago would join the conference starting with the 2022–23 season, giving the conference 15 members. At the time, the A-10 did not anticipate gaining or losing any further full members for the foreseeable future, but UMass left for the MAC in 2025.

==== Formation of A-10 men's lacrosse league ====
For several years, the A-10 had been working toward establishing a men's lacrosse league. As of the 2022 season (2021–22 school year), four of its full members (Richmond, St. Bonaventure, Saint Joseph's, and UMass) sponsored men's lacrosse, two short of the number of members required for an automatic berth in the NCAA tournament. On February 2, 2022, USA Lacrosse Magazine reported that the A-10 was evaluating Fairfield, High Point, and Hobart as potential affiliates to reach the required membership total. The A-10 officially announced the addition of men's lacrosse on May 23, 2022, with the four full members joined by High Point and Hobart.

Accordingly, this meant that all of the aforementioned programs would be leaving their current conferences in order to join the A-10's new league. The Colonial Athletic Association, which was the former home of UMass men's lacrosse, was also going through a realignment of its own (see CAA section) and planned on bringing in more lacrosse sponsoring institutions to the conference, while the Metro Atlantic Athletic Conference, St. Bonaventure's former home, still sat at 6 members even after the Bonnies' departure. However, the Northeast Conference, former home of Saint Joseph's and Hobart, as well as the Southern Conference, former home of High Point and Richmond, were put in a more trying situation. The NEC, while also losing the aforementioned two programs, was also losing Bryant and Mount St. Mary's, two full NEC members that both sponsored men's lacrosse. Meanwhile, the SoCon was already sitting precariously at 6 men's lacrosse institutions, and simply could not afford to lose any of their members. This left both conferences with only 4 men's lacrosse sponsoring members each, and with no other option available to them, both conferences announced they would stop sponsoring the sport effective with the 2023 season (though the NEC would eventually reinstate the sport in 2024–25). Three of the four lacrosse programs in the NEC (LIU, Sacred Heart, and Wagner) announced they would join the MAAC as men's lacrosse affiliates, while the fourth, Merrimack, ultimately announced it would house its men's lacrosse program in the America East Conference. For the SoCon, VMI announced it too would be joining the MAAC in lacrosse, which was its former home for the sport from 2002 to 2013. Meanwhile, Jacksonville returned to its full-time home of the ASUN Conference, (Note: When the ASUN reestablished its men's lacrosse league for the 2022 season, Jacksonville remained in SoCon men's lacrosse under the terms of an agreement between the ASUN and SoCon.) joined by Mercer as an affiliate, while Hampton, who was poised to join the CAA as a full member in 2022, had already made plans to move its lacrosse program to the conference as well.

=== Horizon League ===
On January 22, 2022, CBSSports.com reported that UIC would leave the Horizon League for the MVC in July. This report was confirmed on January 26 when UIC was unveiled as a new MVC member, effective that July. The Horizon League dropped to 11 members going forward.

On July 6, 2022, the Ohio Valley Conference (OVC) and Horizon League announced their plans to merge their respective men's tennis leagues effective in the 2022–23 academic year, as already noted. OVC members that sponsor the sport, as well as Belmont, which had left the OVC days earlier for the Missouri Valley Conference, now compete as Horizon affiliate members. Chicago State also became an affiliate member in both men's and women's tennis. The Horizon's men's tennis membership expanded to 11 through the 2023–24 season, but after that season dropped to 10 with full OVC member Lindenwood dropping men's tennis along with eight other NCAA sports. It dropped to 8 members for the 2025–26 season with the departure of Chicago State tennis, which joined the rest of the school's sports in the Northeast Conference, and the elimination of the men's tennis program of affiliate Eastern Illinois.

In 2026, Northern Illinois rejoined the Horizon League after a nearly 30-year absence.

=== Metro Atlantic Athletic/Metro Conference ===
On May 2, 2022, the Metro Atlantic Athletic Conference announced that Mount St. Mary's University would be Monmouth's replacement in the conference starting with the 2022–23 season, maintaining the MAAC's membership at 11 schools.

The MAAC would announce a further expansion in October 2023, with Merrimack and Sacred Heart joining from the NEC in July 2024. This brought the MAAC to its largest-ever membership total of 13.

On May 27, 2026, the conference announced it would rename itself the Metro Conference effective that July 1. (Note: Not to be confused with the Metro Conference that operated from 1975–1995 before merging into Conference USA.) A month later, charter conference member Fairfield announced it would leave the Metro for the CAA in 2027. The Metro replaced Fairfield with Le Moyne, and would also add Stonehill at the same time.

=== Missouri Valley Conference ===
Losing Loyola Chicago, whose men's basketball team had made the Final Four in 2018 and Sweet Sixteen in 2021, was a significant athletic blow to the MVC, but was arguably a larger institutional blow. The Chicago area, especially its suburbs, is a major source of students for many MVC members, and Loyola's departure would leave the conference without a significant presence in the city. (Note: At the time, the MVC had another member in the Chicago area, Valparaiso, but that school is on the eastern fringes of the federally defined Chicago area (as opposed to Loyola being in Chicago proper), and has less than a third of the enrollment of Loyola.) The basketball issue was addressed with the addition of Belmont and Murray State, both frequent contenders for NCAA men's tournament berths, putting the Missouri Valley Conference at 11 members. The issue of a Chicago presence was addressed by entering into negotiations with the city's largest university, UIC. CBSSports.com reported on January 22, 2022, that UIC had indeed been invited and accepted; this move was made official four days later. The conference reportedly reached out to Kansas City of the Summit League for potential membership before this, in addition to UIC, as well as Sun Belt member UT Arlington (which instead rejoined the WAC).

As previously noted, Missouri State left the MVC for CUSA in 2025, coinciding with the formalization of the ties between the MVC and Missouri Valley Football Conference.

=== Summit League ===
On October 4, 2019, the University of St. Thomas, a Minnesota school that was set to be expelled from its longtime athletic home of the NCAA Division III Minnesota Intercollegiate Athletic Conference (MIAC) in 2021, announced that it received an invitation to join the Summit upon its MIAC departure, starting in 2021–22. St. Thomas eventually received a waiver of an NCAA rule mandating that Division III schools can only transition to Division II, allowing the school to move directly to D-I on the originally announced schedule.

On May 12, 2023, Western Illinois University announced that it would leave the Summit League for the Ohio Valley Conference that July. As noted earlier, the men's soccer team remained in the Summit through the 2023 season, after which it joined the OVC. Western Illinois had been a member of the Summit since its 1982 formation as the Association of Mid-Continent Universities, and was the last one of these schools to remain in the conference.

As noted previously, the Summit became an official partner in the Missouri Valley Football Conference starting with the 2025 season.

On October 31, 2025, it was announced that Denver would be leaving the Summit League for the West Coast Conference in all the sports it plays in the former league, beginning on July 1, 2026.

=== West Coast Conference ===
With Brigham Young University leaving the West Coast Conference for the Big 12 in 2023, the WCC dropped to 9 members going forward.

On July 19, 2022, it was announced that the WCC would add men's water polo in 2023–24 with seven members—the four WCC members that sponsor the sport (Loyola Marymount, Pacific, Pepperdine and Santa Clara) plus three affiliates (Air Force, California Baptist and San Jose State). Consequently, two water polo-only conferences were directly affected: the Western Water Polo Association (WWPA) lost four of its then-current nine men's members and the Golden Coast Conference (GCC) lost three of its then-current six men's members (neither conference's women's side was affected).

In December of that year, multiple media reports indicated that the two schools left behind in the mass exodus from the Pac-12, Oregon State and Washington State, were nearing a short-term deal with the WCC for affiliate membership in all sports apart from baseball. Under this arrangement, which would operate in 2024–25 and 2025–26, the so-called "Pac-2" would be eligible for WCC championships and be able to represent the WCC in NCAA championship events. The agreement was officially announced on December 22.

The WCC would expand still further, announcing on May 10, 2024 that Grand Canyon and Seattle would leave the Western Athletic Conference for the WCC in July 2025. Seattle returned to the WCC after a 45-year absence. However, the WCC would lose Gonzaga to the reimagined Pac-12 in 2026, and Grand Canyon announced in November 2024 that it had reneged on its WCC move to instead join the Mountain West Conference. The WCC remains at 10 members in 2026 with the arrival of Denver, and will expand to 12 in 2027 with the arrival of UC San Diego and UC Santa Barbara, both from the Big West Conference. The two University of California campuses will become the WCC's first public schools since Nevada left for the Big Sky Conference in 1979.

=== Big West Conference ===
Hawaiʻi and UC Davis left in 2026 for the Mountain West Conference (with Hawaiʻi having been an MW football member since 2012), while California Baptist, Sacramento State, and Utah Valley joined in 2026, and UC San Diego and UC Santa Barbara will leave for the West Coast Conference in 2027. The BWC added three sports during the cycle, but would later drop two of these.

Men's water polo was added effective in the 2023 season (2023–24 school year) with six full conference members—Cal State Fullerton, Long Beach State, UC Davis, UC Irvine, UC San Diego, and UC Santa Barbara. Of these schools, Long Beach State, UC Irvine, and UC Santa Barbara had been the last three members of the men's side of the GCC; UC Davis and UC San Diego had been in the WWPA; and Cal State Fullerton launched new varsity teams in both men's and women's water polo.

Men's and women's swimming & diving were added in 2024–25. However, both sports were dropped after the 2025–26 season.

== Ice hockey conferences affected ==
=== Central Collegiate Hockey Association ===
On June 28, 2019, seven schools from the ten-member men's side of the Western Collegiate Hockey Association (WCHA) began the process of withdrawing from the conference, with the intent of forming a new conference for the 2021–22 season. These seven schools were Bemidji State, Bowling Green (who had retained the rights to the CCHA name), Ferris State, Lake Superior State, Michigan Tech, Minnesota State and Northern Michigan. The seven schools cited a more compact geographic footprint as one reason for the move; the remaining three WCHA members, Alabama-Huntsville, Alaska and Alaska–Anchorage, all geographic outliers in the WCHA, were notably absent. On February 18, 2020, these seven schools announced they would begin competing in a new CCHA in 2021–22. Later that year, the University of St. Thomas, a former D-III school who had been granted a waiver by the NCAA earlier in the year to transition directly to D-I, was announced to be joining the new CCHA as a member on July 29, 2020, bringing the membership up to an even eight teams.

On May 17, 2022, Augustana University was announced as the league's ninth member. The Vikings played a partial league schedule in the 2023–24 and 2024–25 seasons before playing a full league schedule in 2025–26. The CCHA lost a member in 2026, with the National Collegiate Hockey Conference announcing in May 2024 that St. Thomas would join that league for the 2026–27 season.

=== Western Collegiate Hockey Association ===
The WCHA men's side was forced to disband after seven of its 10 schools left the conference to reestablish the CCHA starting in the 2021–22 academic year. Of the other three remaining programs, Alabama-Huntsville disbanded its program after the 2020–21 season, Alaska became independent, and Alaska–Anchorage would be cut after the 2020–21 season due to a reduction in state funding unless the program could raise $3 million, and the program went on hiatus that year while its future was uncertain. Ultimately, the program was saved, and it returned to play in the 2022–23 season as an independent, following the dissolution of the men's side of its former conference, the WCHA.

The WCHA still operates as a women's ice hockey-only conference and the women's WCHA announced a further expansion effective in 2021–22 with the arrival of St. Thomas, a Twin Cities school that received NCAA approval to directly transition from Division III. The Summit League offered the Tommies a D-I home, and backed the school's bid to directly transition from D-III. Interestingly, through the 2025–26 season, St. Thomas was a member of the men's ice hockey-only CCHA (the conference that replaced the WCHA on the men's side), while being a WCHA member for its women's program.

=== National Collegiate Hockey Conference ===
The National Collegiate Hockey Conference (NCHC), which had not had a membership change since its formation in 2011 and start of play in 2013, announced on July 5, 2023, that Arizona State would become the league's ninth member in 2024. The Sun Devils had played as a D-I independent since being elevated from club to varsity status in 2015. The NCHC announced a further expansion in May 2024, announcing that St. Thomas would join from the CCHA in 2026.

=== Atlantic Hockey Association ===
The only change to the membership of the Atlantic Hockey Association (AHA) was the temporary departure of Robert Morris, which had dropped both men's and women's ice hockey after the 2020–21 season due to COVID-19 impacts but reinstated both teams in 2023–24.

However, a more significant change would come in June 2023 when AHA and College Hockey America (CHA), then a women-only league, jointly announced they would merge into a single conference after the 2023–24 season. The two leagues, while having separate governing boards and bylaws, had a longstanding relationship, having operated with a single commissioner and conference staff since 2010. On April 30, 2024, the new conference was unveiled as Atlantic Hockey America, retaining the AHA initialism.

=== Atlantic Hockey America ===
Shortly after the merger, AHA would lose the American International men when the school announced it would align that team with the rest of its athletic program in Division II after the 2024–25 season. (Note: The NCAA has not sponsored a Division II championship in men's ice hockey since 1998. American International is a full member of the Northeast-10 Conference, most of whose members field men's ice hockey teams within that conference under Division II regulations.) After the 2025–26 season, AHA lost another men's member with Mercyhurst shutting down its men's team while remaining a member of the women's division.

=== Women's ice hockey ===
==== New England Women's Hockey Alliance ====
Stonehill, which had announced a move up from Division II, added women's ice hockey starting in 2022–23, joining the New England Women's Hockey Alliance (NEWHA).

On June 29, 2022, the NEWHA announced that it would expand to 8 members with the addition of Assumption University, which officially joined for administrative purposes on July 1 but did not start conference play until launching its varsity program in the 2023–24 season.

Charter NEWHA member Saint Anselm announced on April 22, 2026 that it would start a transition from Division II to Division III after the 2026–27 season as a new member of the New England Women's and Men's Athletic Conference.

==== College Hockey America ====
As noted previously, College Hockey America fully merged with the Atlantic Hockey Association in July 2024 under the banner of Atlantic Hockey America. The two predecessor conferences had shared a commissioner and office staff since 2010. The first change to CHA during the realignment was the temporary departure of Robert Morris. On December 1, 2023, CHA announced that Delaware would join the conference for the school's first season of varsity women's hockey in 2025–26. Delaware's membership accordingly transferred to the merged AHA.

== Men's volleyball ==
Four all-sports conferences in Divisions I and II began men's volleyball competition during the realignment cycle. The top-level NCAA championship is currently open to members of both divisions.

The Southern Intercollegiate Athletic Conference (SIAC), a D-II league whose full membership consists almost entirely of historically black colleges and universities (HBCUs), initially planned to start men's volleyball competition in the 2021 season (2020–21 school year) (Note: Men and women play NCAA volleyball in separate seasons—men in spring and women in fall.) with six members, all HBCUs. COVID-19 concerns led the SIAC to delay the start of men's volleyball to the 2022 season, by which time it had lost one of its originally planned members but had added a replacement (Edward Waters). The SIAC men's volleyball membership expanded to seven in the 2025 season with the addition of a new program at full conference member and HBCU LeMoyne–Owen.

In September 2021, the NEC (then officially known as the Northeast Conference) announced that it would start men's volleyball competition in the 2023 season, making it the second D-I all-sports conference to sponsor men's volleyball after the Big West Conference. The NEC initially announced that its new league would feature six programs, all representing full NEC members. Fairleigh Dickinson and LIU started competition in the 2022 season as independents; transitional D-I member Merrimack would start a new varsity program in 2023; and Sacred Heart, St. Francis Brooklyn, and Saint Francis (PA) moved from the single-sport Eastern Intercollegiate Volleyball Association (EIVA). The EIVA retained six members and with it its automatic NCAA tournament bid. Shortly after the end of the 2022 season, the NEC announced that two D-II schools that had previously played as independents, Daemen and D'Youville (the latter then a transitional D-II member), would become single-sport NEC associates. NEC men's volleyball would lose St. Francis Brooklyn after the 2023 season when it shut down its athletic program, Sacred Heart after the 2024 season when it returned to the EIVA, and Saint Francis (PA) after the 2026 season when it moved to Division III. The Pennsylvania school's final NEC season was also the first season of varsity play for new NEC affiliates Manhattan and UMES. NEC men's volleyball would also add former full member Merrimack as an affiliate starting with the 2027 season.

In May 2023, the Division II East Coast Conference announced it would add men's volleyball and play its first season in 2024. Full members Roberts Wesleyan and St. Thomas Aquinas were joined by associates American International and Dominican (NY). Alliance had been announced as an associate member, but the university closed immediately before the start of the 2023–24 school year. All of the inaugural ECC men's volleyball members started new men's volleyball programs except for American International, which competed as an independent in 2023. The ECC added a fifth men's volleyball member, one short of the level needed for an eventual automatic bid to the NCAA championship, when full member Mercy added the sport in the 2027 season.

Another Division II conference, the Great Lakes Valley Conference (GLVC), added men's volleyball for the 2026 season. Five full GLVC members played men's volleyball in the 2024 season, with Lewis, McKendree, and Quincy in the single-sport Midwestern Intercollegiate Volleyball Association (MIVA) and Maryville (MO) and Missouri S&T as independents. Rockhurst became the sixth GLVC member to sponsor the sport in the 2025 season, initially as an independent, and Southwest Baptist became the seventh in the 2026 season. Lewis and McKendree remain in the MIVA, with the other full GLVC members being joined by former independent Thomas More plus transitional Division II member Jamestown. Thomas More would ultimately play only in the 2026 season, dropping the sport after that season.

The MIVA, which started the realignment cycle with eight members, expanded to nine members in the 2024 season with the addition of Queens (NC) from the independent ranks. Queens had originally planned to join the MIVA for 2023, but its entry was delayed a year. After the 2025 season, Quincy left for the new GLVC men's volleyball league, but the MIVA maintained its membership at nine with the entry of the new varsity program at Northern Kentucky.

== Men's water polo ==
As noted above, the men's side of the Golden Coast Conference (GCC) disbanded following the 2022 men's season (2022–23 school year) after all of its final six members left for the new men's water polo leagues of the Big West and West Coast Conferences. The GCC remains in operation as a women-only conference.

The men's side of the Western Water Polo Association (WWPA), which lost four of its members to the West Coast Conference's new league, reloaded by adding four Division II members effective with the 2023 season—Gannon, McKendree, Mercyhurst, and Salem. All were already WWPA women's members. However, Mercyhurst would play only one season in the WWPA, returning its men's and women's teams in the sport to the school's former home of the Collegiate Water Polo Association (Note: The CWPA men's division is split into the Mid-Atlantic and Northeast Water Polo Conferences. Mercyhurst competes in the Mid-Atlantic Conference.) after the 2023–24 school year.

== Membership change statistics ==
=== Full membership ===
The following table lists all Division I all-sports conferences and changes to membership as a result of the realignment.

Conference	Old membership total	New membership total	Net change	Members added	Members lost
ACC	15	18	+3	3	0
America East	10	9	−1	1	2
American	11	14	+3	7	4
ASUN	9	8	−1	7	8
Atlantic 10	14	14	0	1	1
Big 12	10	16	+6	8	2
Big East	11	11	0	0	0
Big South	11	9	−2	1	3
Big Sky	11	11	0	2	2
Big Ten	14	18	+4	4	0
Big West	11	10	−1	3	4
Colonial/Coastal (CAA)	10	14	+4	6	2
Conference USA	14	10	−4	7	11
Horizon	12	12	0	1	1
Ivy	8	8	N/A	0	0
MAAC/Metro	11	13	+2	4	2
MAC	12	12	0	1	1
MEAC	11	8	−3	0	3
Missouri Valley	10	11	+1	3	2
MW	11	10	−1	4	5
NEC	10	8	−2	5	7
Ohio Valley	12	9	−3	4	7
Pac-12	12	9	−3	7	10
Patriot	10	10	N/A	0	0
SEC	14	16	+2	2	0
SoCon	10	11	+1	1	0
Southland	13	12	−1	4	5
SWAC	10	12	+2	2	0
Summit	9	8	−1	1	2
Sun Belt	12	13	+1	5	4
WAC/UAC	9	9	0	12	12
West Coast	10	12	+2	4	2
Independent (Note: Not a conference, but added for comparison in membership changes.)	0	0	0	2	2

=== Football ===
The following table is reflective of both football-only membership changes and full membership changes that include football.

Conference	Subdivision	Old membership total	New membership total	Net change	Members added	Members lost
ACC	FBS	14	17	+3	3	0
American	FBS	11	15	+4	8	4
ASUN	FCS	0	0 (Note: As of the 2026 season, all full ASUN members that play scholarship FCS football are associate members of the United Athletic Conference (UAC), which took over a football-only UAC created from the merger of the existing football leagues of the Atlantic Sun (ASUN) and Western Athletic Conference (WAC). The WAC rebranded as the UAC in 2026 as an all-sports conference, and now consists of 9 full-time members and 8 football members, with 5 full-time members coming from the pre-2026 ASUN, 2 from the pre-2026 WAC (plus one non-football member from the pre-2026 WAC and another non-football member arriving from the OVC). One ASUN member that joined in 2026 is a football-only member of the UAC.)	0	7	7
Big Sky	FCS	13	13	0	2	2
Big South	FCS	9	0 (Note: From 2023–25, teams played in the OVC–Big South Football Association, a football-only alliance between Big South and Ohio Valley Conference (OVC). In its final season in 2025, the OVC–Big South consisted of 9 teams (2 teams from Big South and 7 teams from OVC). In 2026, coinciding with the departure of OVC member Tennessee Tech to the Southern Conference, the Big South and OVC agreed that the alliance would be reincorporated into the OVC, with the two Big South alliance members becoming OVC football affiliates.)	−9	2	11
Big 12	FBS	10	16	+6	8	2
Big Ten	FBS	14	18	+4	4	0
CAA Football	FCS	12	13	+1	6	5
Conference USA	FBS	14	10	−4	7	11
Ivy	FCS	8	8	N/A	0	0
MAC	FBS	12	13	+1	2	1
MEAC	FCS	11	8	−3	0	3
MVFC	FCS	11	9	−2	1	3
MW	FBS	12	10	−3	3	5
NEC	FCS	8	9	+1	6	5
Ohio Valley	FCS	9	8	−1	4	5
Pac-12	FBS	12	8	−4	6	10
Patriot	FCS	7	10	+3	3	0
Pioneer	FCS	9	11	+2	2	0
SEC	FBS	14	16	+2	2	0
SoCon	FCS	9	10	+1	1	0
Southland	FCS	11	10	−1	4	5
Sun Belt	FBS	10	13	+3	5	2
SWAC	FCS	10	12	+2	2	0
WAC/UAC	FCS	0	8	+4	13	5
FBS Independents	FBS	7	2	−5	0	5
FCS Independents	FCS	0	1	+1	4	3

== List of FBS schools changing conferences since 2022 ==
The following list only includes changes to the primary conference affiliation or football-only affiliations of FBS schools or those that moved from FCS to FBS.

=== 2022 ===
School	Former Conference	New Conference
James Madison Dukes	CAA (FCS – CAA Football)	Sun Belt
Marshall Thundering Herd	CUSA	Sun Belt
Old Dominion Monarchs	CUSA	Sun Belt
Southern Miss Golden Eagles	CUSA	Sun Belt

=== 2023 ===
School	Former Conference	New Conference
BYU Cougars	WCC (FBS Independent)	Big 12
Charlotte 49ers	CUSA	American
Cincinnati Bearcats	American	Big 12
Florida Atlantic Owls	CUSA	American
Houston Cougars	American	Big 12
Jacksonville State Gamecocks	ASUN (FCS)	CUSA
Liberty Flames	ASUN (FBS Independent)	CUSA
New Mexico State Aggies	WAC (FBS Independent)	CUSA
North Texas Mean Green	CUSA	American
Rice Owls	CUSA	American
Sam Houston Bearkats	WAC (FCS)	CUSA
UAB Blazers	CUSA	American
UCF Knights	American	Big 12
UTSA Roadrunners	CUSA	American

=== 2024 ===
School	Former Conference	New Conference
Arizona Wildcats	Pac-12	Big 12
Arizona State Sun Devils	Pac-12	Big 12
California Golden Bears	Pac-12	ACC
Colorado Buffaloes	Pac-12	Big 12
Kennesaw State Owls	ASUN (FCS Independent)	CUSA
Oklahoma Sooners	Big 12	SEC
Oregon Ducks	Pac-12	Big Ten
SMU Mustangs	American	ACC
Stanford Cardinal	Pac-12	ACC
Texas Longhorns	Big 12	SEC
UCLA Bruins	Pac-12	Big Ten
USC Trojans	Pac-12	Big Ten
Utah Utes	Pac-12	Big 12
Washington Huskies	Pac-12	Big Ten

=== 2025 ===
School	Former Conference	New Conference
Delaware Fightin' Blue Hens	CAA (FCS – CAA Football)	CUSA
UMass Minutemen & Minutewomen	A-10 (FBS Independent)	MAC
Missouri State Bears & Lady Bears	Missouri Valley (FCS - MVFC)	CUSA

=== 2026 ===
School	Former Conference	New Conference
Boise State Broncos	Mountain West	Pac-12
Colorado State Rams	Mountain West	Pac-12
Fresno State Bulldogs	Mountain West	Pac-12
Hawaiʻi Rainbow Warriors & Rainbow Wahine	Big West (Football: Mountain West)	Mountain West
Louisiana Tech Bulldogs and Lady Techsters	CUSA	Sun Belt
North Dakota State Bison	Missouri Valley (FCS)	Football Only: Mountain West
Northern Illinois Huskies	MAC	Horizon; Football Only: Mountain West
Sacramento State Hornets	Big Sky (FCS)	Big West; Football Only: MAC
San Diego State Aztecs	Mountain West	Pac-12
Texas State Bobcats	Sun Belt	Pac-12
Utah State Aggies	Mountain West	Pac-12
UTEP Miners	CUSA	Mountain West

=== 2028 ===
School	Former Conference	New Conference
James Madison Dukes	Sun Belt	American

== See also ==
- 2010–2014 NCAA conference realignment
- 2005 NCAA conference realignment
- 1996 NCAA conference realignment
- List of NCAA Division I conference changes in the 2020s
