= Craig Angelos =

American sports administrator

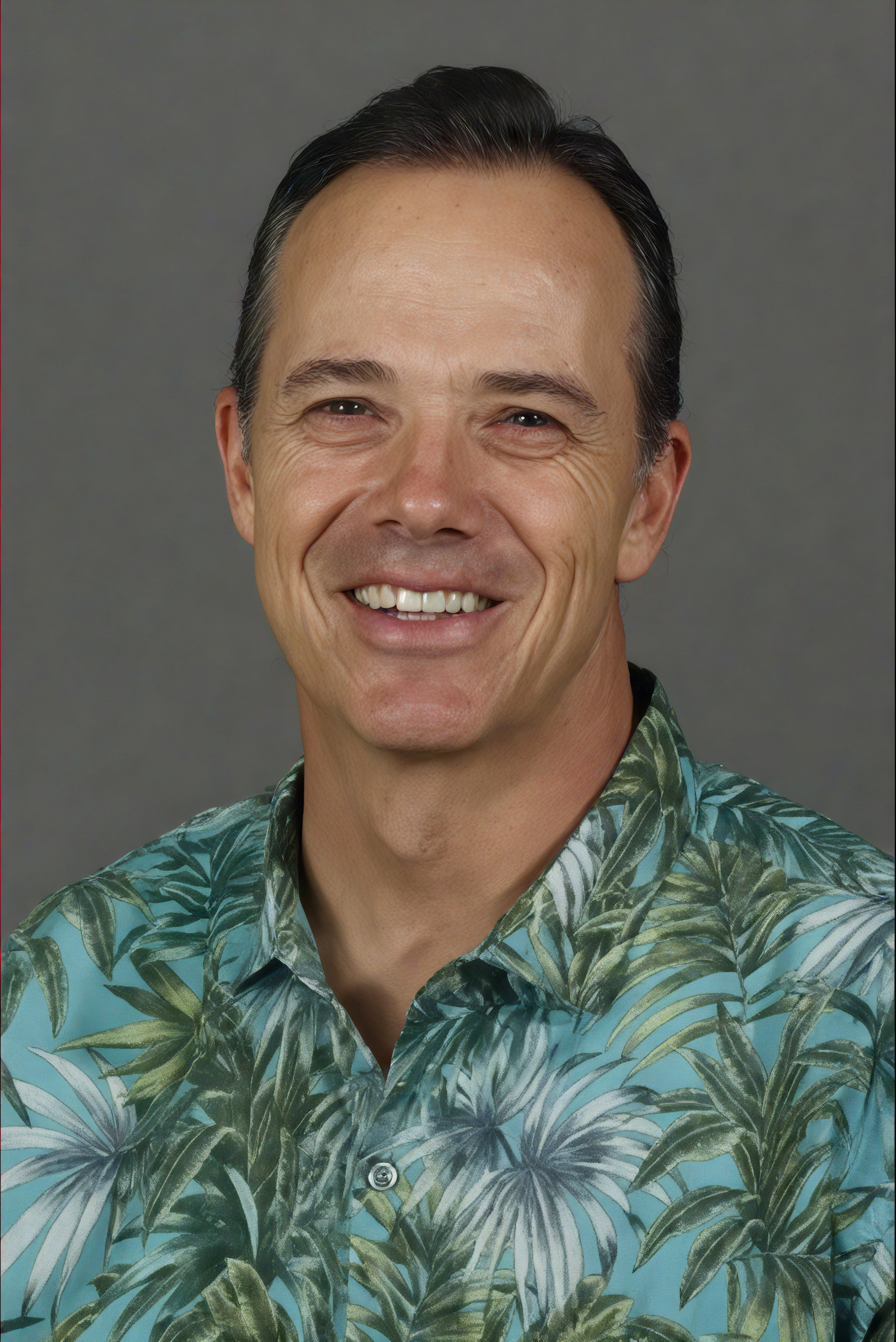
- Angelos in 2024

Biographical details
- Born: Salt Lake City, Utah, U.S.
- Education: Brigham Young University

Administrative career (AD unless noted)
- 1994–2001: Miami (FL) (Sr. Assoc. Athletics Director)
- 2001–2003: Indiana (Deputy AD - External)
- 2003–2012: Florida Atlantic
- 2012–2014: South Florida (Sr. Assoc. AD)
- 2014–2015: FIU (Sr. Assoc. AD)
- 2015–2022: Temple (Deputy AD)
- 2022–2023: LIU (Sr. Deputy AD)
- 2023–2024: Hawaii

Craig Angelos is the former athletic director at the University of Hawai'i at Manoa. He was introduced as athletic director on May 18, 2023, and previously was athletic director for Florida Atlantic University from 2002 to 2012.

In 2024, Angelos successfully negotiated full membership for the Rainbow Warriors and Rainbow Wahine programs in their athletic conference. This negotiation included the removal of travel subsidies, resulting in approximately $1 million in annual savings for the University of Hawai'i athletics department.

Angelos is recognized as a pioneer in utilizing sports betting as a revenue source for collegiate athletics and higher education institutions. He has developed partnerships with various industry entities, particularly Circa Sports, to build revenue-generating initiatives.

Angelos promised to invest and enhance the football program in Mānoa. He negotiated with Hawaiian Airlines to charter all away football travel and saved the department roughly $750,000 with the move. The move improved road team performance and enhanced team GPAs after returning home earlier.

On November 19, 2024, it was announced that Angelos would part ways with the university on December 1, 2024 based on performance.

== Early life ==
Angelos prepped at Skyline High School, where he was the 4A MVP in football and all-state in baseball. He was all-league, team MVP, and led the conference in home runs at Rio Hondo Junior College.

== Career ==
Angelos was the athletic director of Florida Atlantic University from 2003 to 2012. Angelos's contract expired in March 2012. His tenure at FAU included the construction of the FAU Stadium, balanced budgets, and the move of the football team from the Division I FCS to the Division I FBS. According to the Palm Beach Post, Angelos was seriously considered for AD jobs at Brigham Young University, Louisiana State University, and Mississippi State University during his tenure at FAU. After leaving FAU, Angelos had stints at the University of South Florida, Florida International University, Temple University, and Long Island University.

On May 12, 2023, Angelos was recommended by University of Hawaiʻi president David Lassner to become the school's athletic director. Unlike previous candidates for AD, Angelos required confirmation from the board of regents in order to be approved due to changes in state law. Angelos was approved by an 8–2 vote on May 18, 2023. After being hired, Angelos gave fundraising and finding a permanent stadium for the football team as his top priorities. Angelos also aims to secure charter flights for the athletic teams, who normally have to fly to away games on commercial airlines. In February 2024, the university received a $1 million endowment to support student-athletes who had attended high schools in the state.

== Personal life ==
Angelos is a native of Utah and graduated from Brigham Young University, where he was a student-athlete on the baseball team. He received his degree in law from Creighton University. He is married and has six children.
