= Mercer Bears men's lacrosse =

College lacrosse team that represents Mercer University in Macon, Georgia

- University: Mercer University
- Head coach: Ryan Danehy (3rd season)
- Stadium: Five Star Stadium
- Location: Macon, Georgia
- Conference: ASUN
- Nickname: Bears
- Colors: Black and orange

The Mercer Bears men's lacrosse team is a college lacrosse team that represents Mercer University in Macon, Georgia, United States. As of the next NCAA lacrosse season of 2023, the Bears compete in the ASUN Conference. Mercer had competed in its full-time home of the Southern Conference (SoCon) through the 2022 season, but the SoCon shuttered its men's lacrosse league after that season. Chad Surman was the head coach of the Bears lacrosse program, after having been named the interim head coach on August 6, 2020 and subsequently having the interim tag removed on October 27, 2020. Ryan Danehy was hired on August 5, 2022.

== History ==
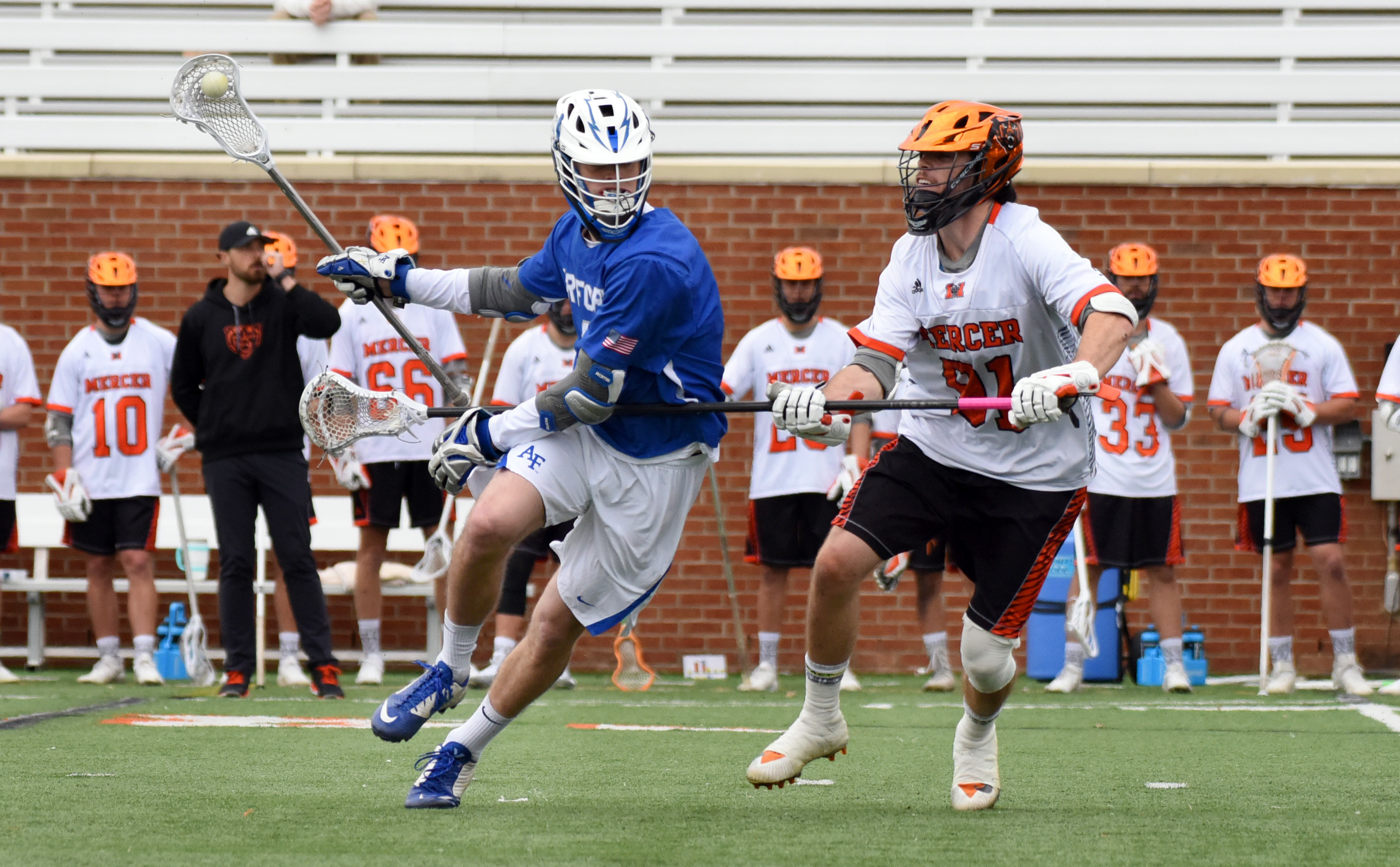
A game between Mercer and Air Force at the Moye Complex in 2019

=== Conference affiliations ===
- Independent (2011–2013)
- ASUN (2014) (Note: Then known as the Atlantic Sun Conference.)
- SoCon (2015–2022)
- ASUN (2023–present)

=== Year by year results ===
Season	Coach	Overall	Conference	Standing	Postseason
2011	Jason Childs	1–12			
2012	Jason Childs	1–13			
2013	Kyle Hannan	4–8			
2014	Kyle Hannan	7–7	4–1	2nd	
2015	Kyle Hannan	5–8	5–1	2nd	
2016	Kyle Hannan	5–8	3–4	5th	
2017	Kyle Hannan	5–8	2–5	6th	
2018	Kyle Hannan	4–10	2–5	7th	
2019	Kyle Hannan	1–12	1–6	7th	
2020	Chad Surman	6–1			
2021	Chad Surman	5–8	2–4	T-5th	
2022	Chad Surman	5–10	2–3	T-3rd	
2023	Ryan Danehy	6–10	5–4	T-4th	
2024	Ryan Danehy	4–10	3–6	T-7th	
2025	Ryan Danehy	2–11	1–4	5th	
2026	Ryan Danehy	1–0	0–0		

=== All-time coaching records ===
Head coach	Years	Win–loss–tie	Pct.
Jason Childs	2011–2012	2–25	.074
Kyle Hannan	2013–2019	31–61	.337
Chad Surman	2020–2022	16–19	.457
Ryan Danehy	2023–present	13–31	.295
