= George Kliavkoff =

College athletics administrator

5th Commissioner of the Pac-12 Conference
- In office July 1, 2021 – February 29, 2024
- Preceded by: Larry Scott
- Succeeded by: Teresa Gould

Personal details
- Born: George Tibor Kliavkoff; 1967 (age 58–59) New York
- Spouse: Ellen Jude Nichols (m. 1998)
- Children: 2
- Education: Boston University (BS); University of Virginia (JD)
- Occupation: Lawyer; Businessman; College Athletics Commissioner

George Tibor Kliavkoff (born 1967) is an American businessperson, a former lawyer, and a former college athletics administrator. He was most recently the commissioner of the Pac-12 Conference, a position he held from 2021 until 2024. Kliavkoff previously held positions at Major League Baseball, NBCUniversal, Hulu, and MGM Resorts International, and was on the boards of A&E Networks, Cirque du Soleil, BetMGM, and others.

== Early life and education ==
Kliavkoff was born in New York State and raised in The Bronx to immigrant parents: Bulgarian Philip George Kliavkoff and Hungarian Susan Eva Sebestyen.

Kliavkoff attended Boston University, graduated in 1989 with a bachelor's degree in journalism, was a member of the university's Kappa Sigma fraternity, Mu Psi chapter, and participated in rowing. He then earned a juris doctor degree from the University of Virginia in 1993.

== Career ==
Kliavkoff launched his professional career as a lawyer before pivoting to a long line of positions in sports and entertainment. After four years at RealNetworks, he joined Major League Baseball in 2003 as an executive vice president for business with MLB Advanced Media. In 2003, Kliavkoff increased the number of subscribers for both MLB.tv and MLB.com that offered "live radio broadcasts on the Internet of every game played, with home, away, and foreign-language feeds available", "3,000 of the greatest games played dating to the 1930s", and "offer[ed] out-of-market fans about 1,500 live video Webcasts of games".

After three years at MLB, as NBCUniversal's first chief digital officer, Kliavkoff was named to lead the transitional management team when NBC Universal and News Corporation announced their online video joint venture in March 2007. He was the venture's interim CEO during its formation until Jason Kilar was hired as the first permanent CEO later that year. Kliavkoff also was on Hulu's board of directors and is recognized as one of the individuals instrumental in founding what became Hulu. He moved to Hearst in 2009, where he was co-president of Hearst Entertainment & Syndication (the company’s cable division that held stakes in ESPN, A&E, Lifetime and History) and president of Hearst Ventures, spending seven years at the company. In 2016, he was named CEO of Jaunt XR, a Disney-backed virtual reality content studio that was subsequently acquired by Verizon.

In 2018, Kliavkoff settled in Las Vegas and was named president of entertainment and sports at MGM Resorts International. In this role, Kliavkoff oversaw operations, finance, strategy, booking, marketing, and ticketing across more than 35 MGM venues. MGM Resorts was at that time the third-largest live events company in the world. His portfolio included hundreds of major concerts and five concurrent Cirque du Soleil productions. Kliavkoff also led BetMGM's strategic growth and was on its board. He also was on a number of other Las Vegas-based boards including T-Mobile Arena and Cirque du Soleil.

During his tenure with MGM, Kliavkoff was on the WNBA's Board of Governors, representing the Las Vegas Aces. He oversaw MGM's sale of the Aces to Las Vegas Raiders owner Mark Davis in 2021. Kliavkoff also was on the boards of the College Football Playoff and the Pasadena Tournament of Roses.

=== Pac-12 Conference ===
On May 13, 2021, Kliavkoff was announced as the Pac-12's choice to replace outgoing commissioner Larry Scott. He assumed the role on July 1, 2021, which began a five-year contract. University of Oregon president Michael H. Schill led the five-person search committee and described Kliavkoff as "the new prototype for a sports commissioner."

Kliavkoff inherited an embattled conference that faced issues with contentious campus relationships, lack of representation in the College Football Playoff, reports of irresponsible conference office spending and shrinking television rights revenues due to the poor performance of the Pac-12 Network.

Kliavkoff led an effort to form an alliance between the Pac-12, the Big Ten and the ACC, with the goal of creating non-conference scheduling opportunities and stabilizing membership.

One day shy of Kliavkoff's one-year anniversary as commissioner of the conference, Pac-12 mainstays USC and UCLA unexpectedly announced intentions to depart for the Big Ten Conference, a move considered "gutting for the future of the Pac-12." On July 27, 2023, Colorado announced it would also leave the Pac-12 in 2024. With the conference reduced to nine teams, Kliavkoff was forced to present the best current media-rights offer on the table to the league's remaining members in hopes of fending off further departures. He did so on August 1, 2023, reportedly revealing an incentive-based deal with Apple with guaranteed payments of around $20 million per school per year, over $10 million less than the rival Big 12 deal. The offer was met with largely negative feedback and began rumors of further defections.

The Pac-12 reportedly was close to sticking together and signing a grant-of-rights contract on the morning of August 4, 2023, with "momentum slowed" between Oregon, Washington, and the Big Ten. However, hours later, Oregon and Washington eventually signed on with the Big Ten, spurring a later departure of Arizona, Arizona State and Utah to the Big 12.

With four schools remaining — California, Oregon State, Stanford and Washington State — Kliavkoff and the Pac-12 issued a statement late on August 4 that its new focus is "securing the best possible future for each of our member universities." On September 1, it was announced that California and Stanford would be departing the Pac-12 for the ACC in 2024.

On September 8, 2023, Oregon State and Washington State — the only two remaining schools in the conference — filed a lawsuit against the Pac-12 and Kliavkoff in Washington State Superior Court for control of the conference, contending that the departing schools, under the conference constitution, forfeited their right to participate in governing the conference by publicly declaring their intention to leave, and that if they retain control they might use it to dissolve the league and drain its millions of dollars in assets.

On February 19, 2024, the Pac-12 board of directors announced that Teresa Gould would replace Kliavkoff as commissioner on March 1.

Analysis of the Pac-12's collapse has noted that Kliavkoff inherited a conference that was already last among the Power Five conferences in per-school media rights revenue, a position it had reached over the prior decade following the independent launch of the Pac-12 Network without a broadcast network partner — unlike the conference networks operated by the Big Ten, SEC, ACC, and Big 12, each of which launched in partnership with ESPN, Fox, or both. The conference had also placed only two participants in the first forty spots of the College Football Playoff's first ten years. A 2023 Los Angeles Times investigation documented multiple instances in which Pac-12 board members — the conference's presidents and chancellors — blocked proposals from Kliavkoff that could have stabilized the conference: a 2021 expansion proposal to absorb remaining Big 12 schools was shut down by USC's president before substantive discussion could occur; a framework negotiated by Kliavkoff with the UC Regents that could have kept UCLA (and thereby the Los Angeles television market) in the conference was rejected by Oregon's interim president; and an ESPN media rights offer that internal Pac-12 analysis indicated was a reasonable starting point for negotiation was replaced, against Kliavkoff’s recommendation, with a $50 million per-school demand from one board member — a figure that caused ESPN to exit negotiations altogether.

== Later career ==
In January 2026, Kliavkoff and co-founder Jennifer Worthington announced the launch of Two Dice, a platform company creating repeatable experience franchises across sports, music, and culture.

== Personal life ==
Kliavkoff grew up in Scarsdale, New York. He married Ellen Jude Nichols in 1998. The couple have two children together. His son, Henry, played men's basketball at Whitman College for two seasons before transferring to the University of Arizona, where he is a student-athlete competing as a flanker for the Arizona Wildcats men's rugby program.

Several months after graduating from law school, Kliavkoff received admission to practice law in California until September 2004.
