= Dartmouth College =

Private university in Hanover, New Hampshire, US

- Latin: Collegii Dartmuthensis
- Motto: Vox clamantis in deserto (Latin – A quotation from the Book of Isaiah in the Old Testament)
- Motto in English: "A voice crying out in the wilderness"
- Type: Private research university
- Established: December 13, 1769; 256 years ago
- Accreditation: NECHE
- Academic affiliations: AAU; COFHE; NAICU; UArctic; Space-grant
- Endowment: $9 billion (2025)
- Budget: $1.5 billion (2024)
- President: Sian Beilock
- Provost: Matt Delmont (interim until 2028)
- Academic staff: 943 (fall 2018)
- Administrative staff: 2,938 full time, 328 part time (Fall 2018)
- Students: 6,746 (fall 2023)
- Undergraduates: 4,447 (fall 2023)
- Postgraduates: 2,299 (fall 2023)
- Location: Hanover, New Hampshire, United States; 43°42′12″N 72°17′18″W
- Campus: 31,869 acres (128.97 km^{2}) (total); Remote town
- Newspaper: The Dartmouth
- Colors: Dartmouth green and white
- Nickname: Big Green
- Sporting affiliations: NCAA Division I FCS – Ivy League; ECAC Hockey; NEISA; IRA; EISA; EARC; EAWRC
- Website: home.dartmouth.edu

Dear Old Dartmouth
- The Dartmouth Decibelles in 2021: file; help

Dartmouth College (/ˈdɑːrtməθ/ DART-məth) is a private Ivy League research university in Hanover, New Hampshire, United States. Established in 1769 by Eleazar Wheelock and Samson Occom to train Native American Christian missionaries, Dartmouth is one of the nine colonial colleges chartered before the American Revolution.

Following a liberal arts curriculum, Dartmouth provides undergraduate instruction in 40 academic departments and interdisciplinary programs, including 60 majors in the humanities, social sciences, natural sciences, and engineering. In addition to the undergraduate faculty of arts and sciences, Dartmouth has four professional and graduate schools: the Geisel School of Medicine, the Thayer School of Engineering, the Tuck School of Business, and the Guarini School of Graduate and Advanced Studies. The university also has affiliations with the Dartmouth–Hitchcock Medical Center. Dartmouth is home to the Rockefeller Center for Public Policy and the Social Sciences, the Hood Museum of Art, the John Sloan Dickey Center for International Understanding, and the Hopkins Center for the Arts. With a student enrollment of about 6,700, Dartmouth is the smallest university in the Ivy League. Undergraduate admissions are highly selective with an acceptance rate of 5.3% for the class of 2028, including a 3.8% rate for regular decision applicants.

Situated on a terrace above the Connecticut River, Dartmouth's 269-acre (109 ha) main campus is in the rural Upper Valley region of New England. The university functions on a quarter system, operating year-round on four ten-week academic terms. Dartmouth is known for its undergraduate focus, Greek culture, outdoors activities, and campus traditions. Its 34 varsity sports teams compete intercollegiately in the Ivy League conference of the NCAA Division I. The university has many prominent alumni, including 170 members of the United States Congress, 25 U.S. governors, 8 U.S. Cabinet secretaries, 3 Nobel Prize laureates, 2 U.S. Supreme Court justices, and a U.S. vice president.

== History ==
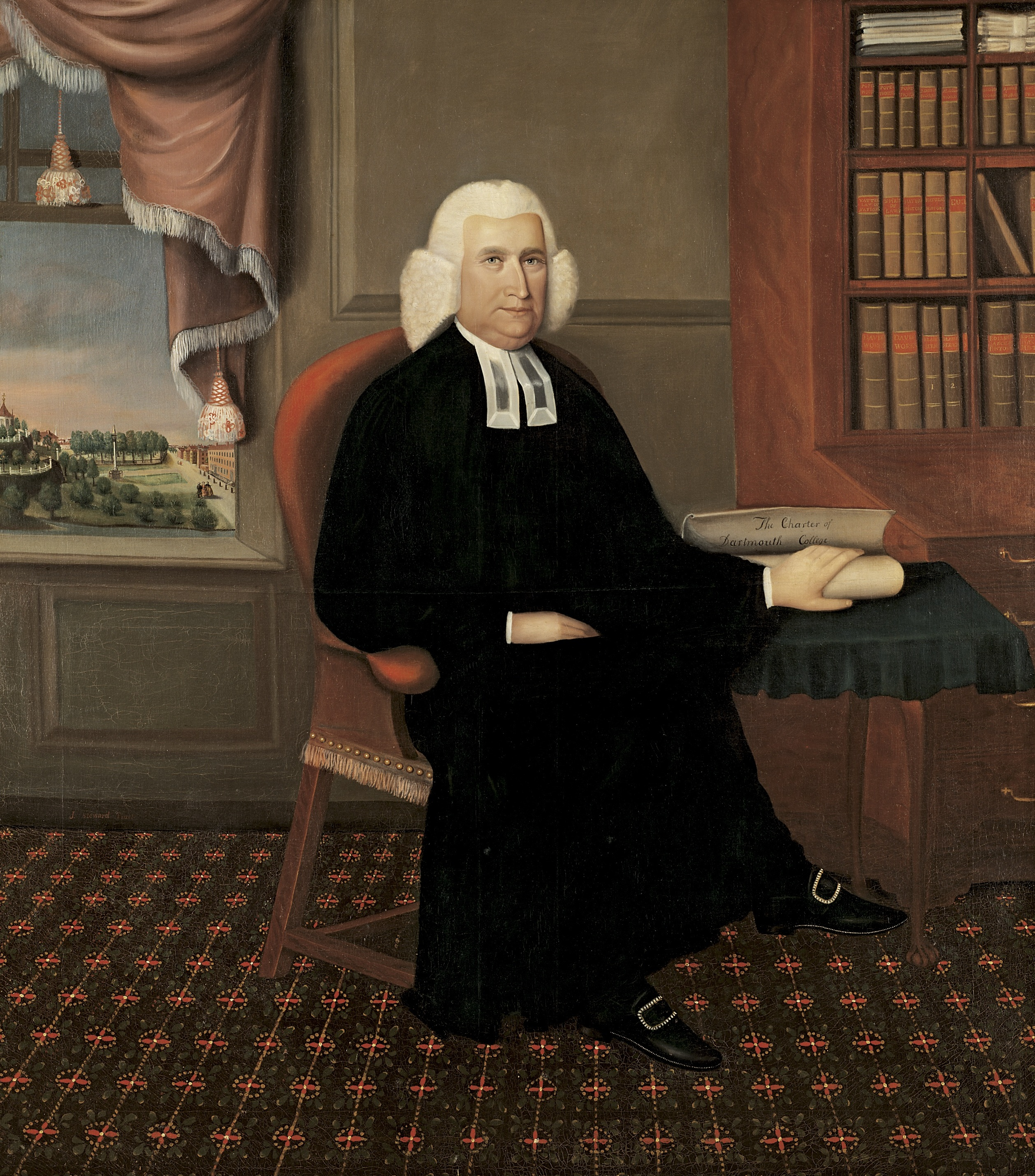
Eleazar Wheelock, Dartmouth College's founder

Dartmouth was founded by Eleazar Wheelock, a Yale graduate and Congregational minister from Windham, Connecticut, who had sought to establish a school to train Native Americans as Christian missionaries. It was one of the nine colonial colleges chartered before the American Revolution. Wheelock's ostensible inspiration for such an establishment resulted from his relationship with Mohegan Indian Samson Occom. Occom became an ordained minister after studying under Wheelock from 1743 to 1747, and later moved to Long Island to preach to the Montauks.

Wheelock founded Moor's Indian Charity School in 1755. The Charity School proved somewhat successful, but additional funding was necessary to continue school's operations, and Wheelock sought the help of friends to raise money. The first major donation to the school was given by John Phillips in 1762, who went on to found Phillips Exeter Academy. Occom, accompanied by the Reverend Nathaniel Whitaker, traveled to England in 1766 to raise money from churches. With these funds, they established a trust to help Wheelock. The head of the trust was a Methodist named William Legge, 2nd Earl of Dartmouth.

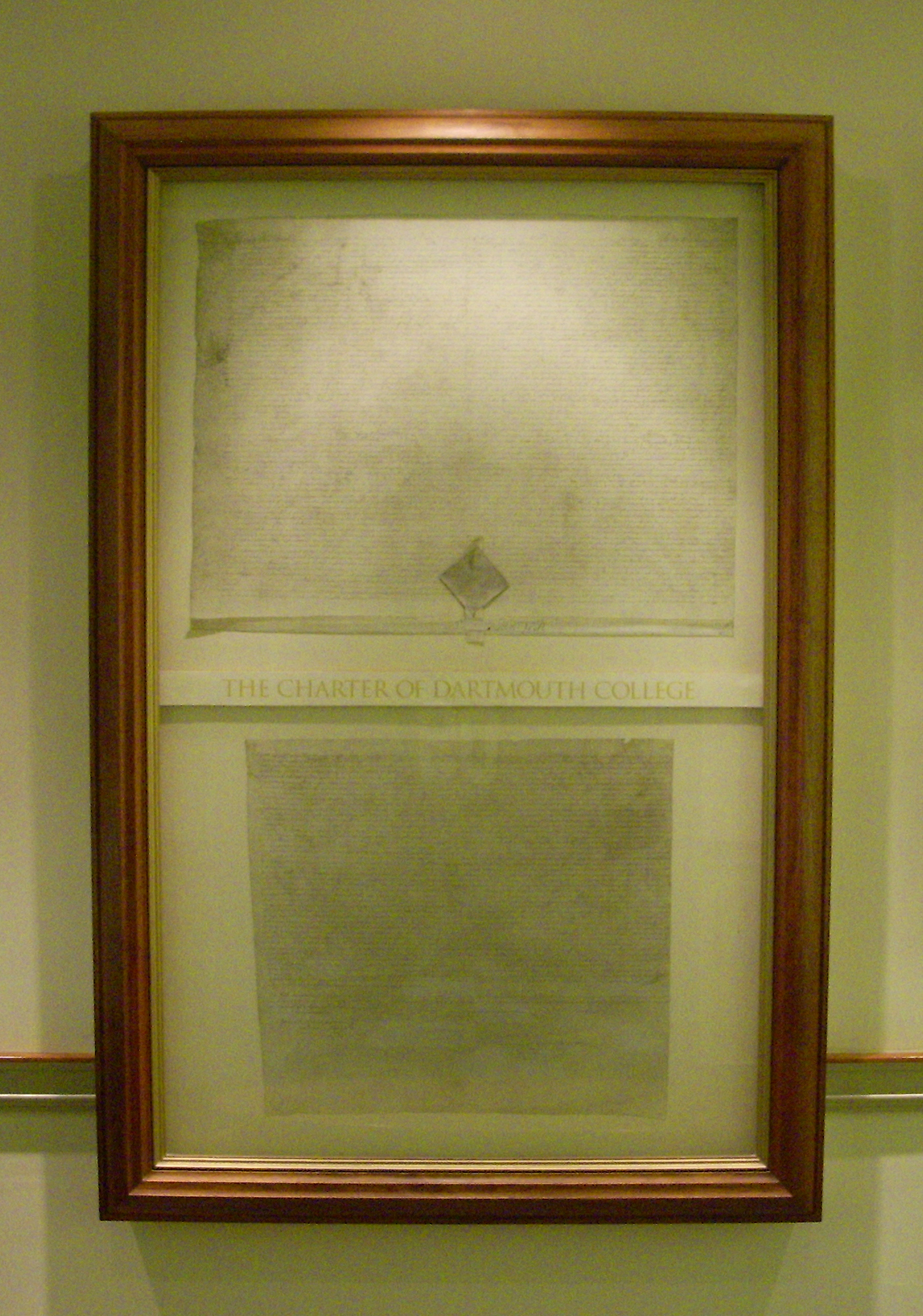
The Charter of Dartmouth College on display in Baker Memorial Library. The charter was signed on December 13, 1769, on behalf of George III.

Although the fund provided Wheelock ample financial support for the Charity School, Wheelock initially had trouble recruiting Indians to the institution, primarily because its location was far from tribal territories. In seeking to expand the school into a college, Wheelock relocated it to Hanover, in the Province of New Hampshire. The move from Connecticut followed a lengthy and sometimes frustrating effort to find resources and secure a charter. The Royal Governor of New Hampshire, John Wentworth, provided the land upon which Dartmouth would be built and on December 13, 1769, issued a royal charter in the name of King George III establishing the college. That charter created a college "for the education and instruction of youth of the Indian tribes in this land in reading, writing, and all parts of learning which shall appear necessary and expedient for civilizing and christianizing children of pagans as well as in all liberal arts and sciences and also of English youth and any others". The reference to educating Native American youth was included to connect Dartmouth to the Charity School and enable the use of the Charity School's unspent trust funds. Named for William Legge, 2nd Earl of Dartmouth – an important supporter of Eleazar Wheelock's earlier efforts but who, in fact, opposed creation of the college and never donated to it – Dartmouth is the nation's ninth oldest college and the last institution of higher learning established under colonial rule. The college granted its first degrees in 1771.

Given the limited success of the Charity School, however, Wheelock intended his new college as one primarily for whites. Occom, disappointed with Wheelock's departure from the school's original goal of Indian Christianization, went on to form his own community of New England Indians called Brothertown Indians in New York.

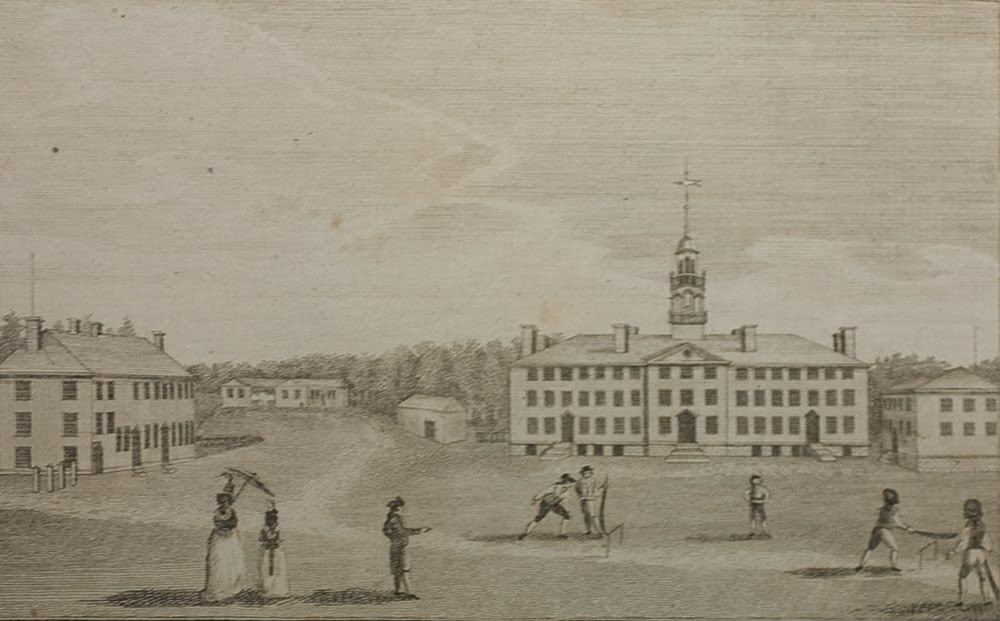
The earliest known image of Dartmouth appeared in the February 1793 issue of Massachusetts Magazine. It depicts a game of wicket.

In 1819, Dartmouth College was the subject of the historic Dartmouth College case, which challenged New Hampshire's 1816 attempt to amend the college charter to make the school a public university. An institution called Dartmouth University occupied the college buildings and began operating in Hanover in 1817, though the college continued teaching classes in rented rooms nearby. Daniel Webster, an alumnus of the class of 1801, presented the college's case to the Supreme Court, which found the amendment of Dartmouth's charter to be an illegal impairment of a contract by the state and reversed New Hampshire's takeover of the college. Webster concluded his peroration with the famous words: "It is, Sir, as I have said, a small college. And yet there are those who love it."

Dartmouth taught its first African-American students in 1775 and 1808. By the end of the Civil War, 20 black men had attended the college or its medical school, and Dartmouth "was recognized in the African-American community as a place where a man of color could go to get educated". One of those first 20 black alumni, Jonathan C. Gibbs, served as Secretary of State and Superintendent of Public Instruction for the state of Florida.

In 1866, the New Hampshire College of Agriculture and the Mechanic Arts was incorporated in Hanover, in connection with Dartmouth College. The institution was officially associated with Dartmouth and was directed by Dartmouth's president. The new college was moved to Durham, New Hampshire, in 1891, and later became known as the University of New Hampshire.

Dartmouth emerged onto the national academic stage at the turn of the 20th century. Prior to this period, the college had clung to traditional methods of instruction and was relatively poorly funded. Under President William Jewett Tucker (1893–1909), Dartmouth underwent a major revitalization of facilities, faculty, and the student body, following large endowments such as the $10,000 given by Dartmouth alumnus and law professor John Ordronaux. 20 new structures replaced antiquated buildings, while the student body and faculty both expanded threefold. Tucker is often credited for having "refounded Dartmouth" and bringing it into national prestige.

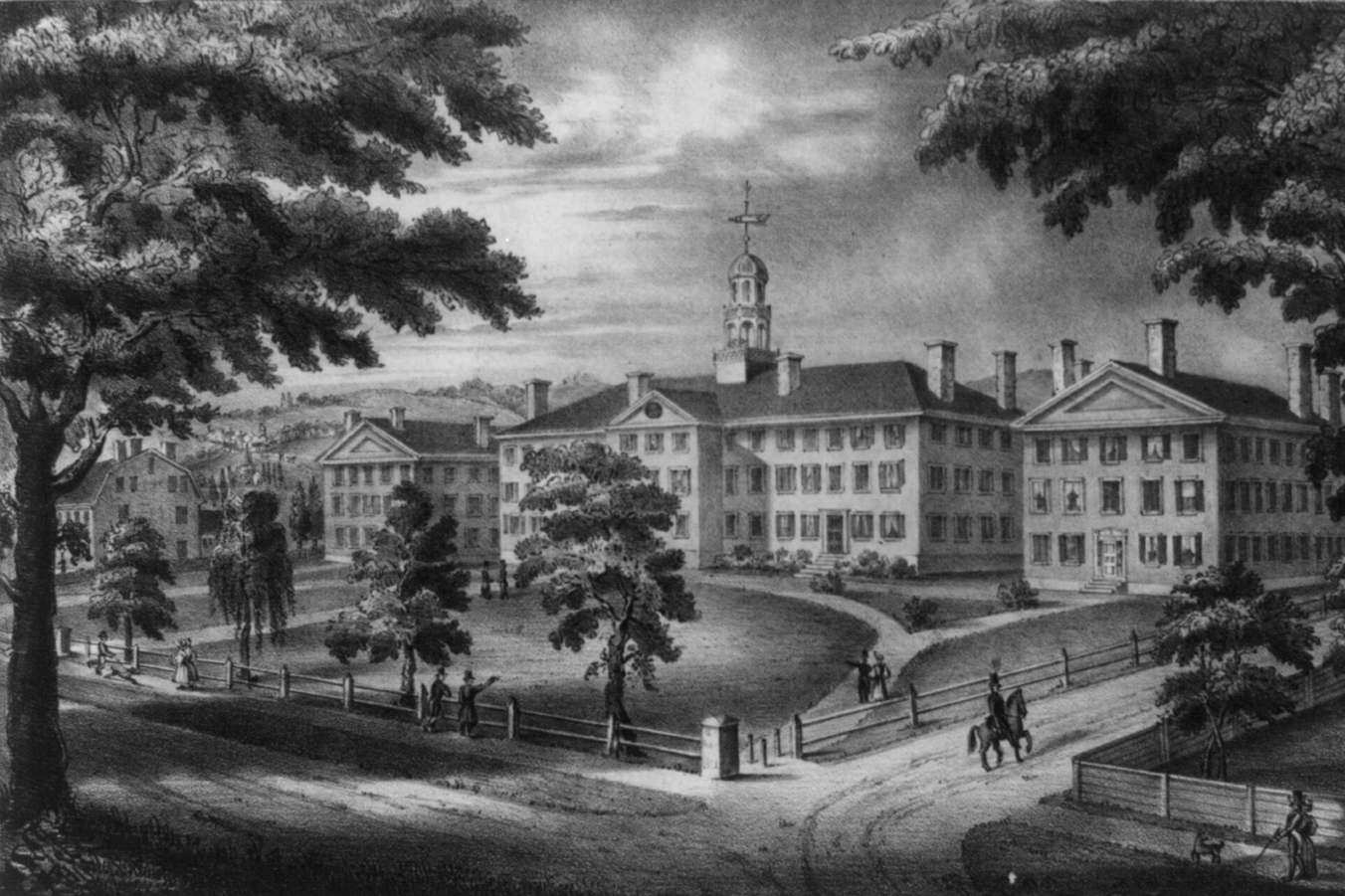
Lithograph of the President's House, Thornton Hall, Dartmouth Hall, and Wentworth Hall

Presidents Ernest Fox Nichols (1909–16) and Ernest Martin Hopkins (1916–45) continued Tucker's trend of modernization, further improving campus facilities and introducing selective admissions in the 1920s. In 1945, Hopkins was subject to no small amount of controversy, as he openly admitted to Dartmouth's practice of using racial quotas to deny Jews entry into the university. John Sloan Dickey, serving as president from 1945 until 1970, strongly emphasized the liberal arts, particularly public policy and international relations. During World War II, Dartmouth was one of 131 colleges and universities nationally that took part in the V-12 Navy College Training Program which offered students a path to a navy commission.

The Dartmouth workshop, which was held in 1956, is widely considered to be the founding event of artificial intelligence as a field.

In 1970, longtime professor of mathematics and computer science John George Kemeny became president of Dartmouth. Kemeny oversaw several major changes at the college. Dartmouth, which had been a men's institution, began admitting women as full-time students and undergraduate degree candidates in 1972 amid much controversy. Lorna C. Hill became the first African-American woman to graduate in the following year, 1973. At about the same time, the college adopted its "Dartmouth Plan" of academic scheduling, permitting the student body to increase in size within the existing facilities.

In 1988, Dartmouth's alma mater song's lyrics changed from "Men of Dartmouth" to "Dear old Dartmouth".

During the 1990s, the college saw a major academic overhaul under President James O. Freedman and a controversial (and ultimately unsuccessful) 1999 initiative to encourage the school's single-sex Greek houses to go coed. The first decade of the 21st century saw the commencement of the $1.5 billion Campaign for the Dartmouth Experience, the largest capital fundraising campaign in the college's history, which surpassed $1 billion in 2008. The mid- and late first decade of the 21st century have also seen extensive campus construction, with the erection of two new housing complexes, full renovation of two dormitories, and a forthcoming dining hall, life sciences center, and visual arts center. In 2004, Booz Allen Hamilton selected Dartmouth College as a model of institutional endurance "whose record of endurance has had implications and benefits for all American organizations, both academic and commercial", citing Dartmouth College v. Woodward and Dartmouth's successful self-reinvention in the late 19th century.

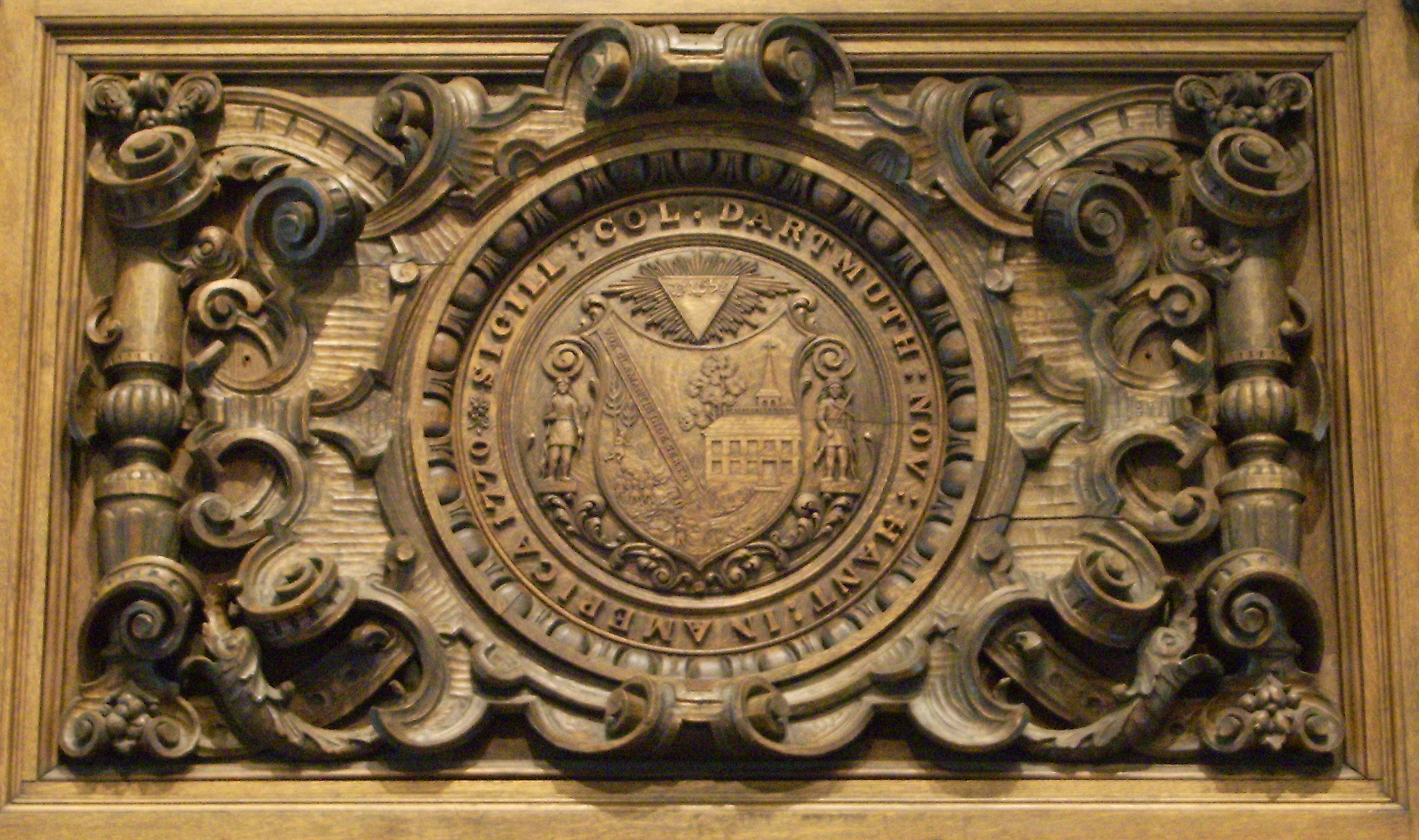
College seal at the Collis Center

Since the election of a number of petition-nominated trustees to the Board of Trustees starting in 2004, the role of alumni in Dartmouth governance has been the subject of ongoing conflict. President James Wright announced his retirement in February 2008 and was replaced by Harvard University professor and physician Jim Yong Kim on July 1, 2009. Kim was succeeded by Philip J. Hanlon in June 2013.

In early August 2019, Dartmouth College agreed to pay nine current and former students a total of $14 million to settle a class-action lawsuit alleging they were sexually harassed by three former neuroscience professors.

In April 2022, Dartmouth College returned the papers of Samson Occom, who helped Eleazar Wheelock secure the funds for Dartmouth College for what Occom believed would be a school for Native students in Connecticut, to the Mohegan Tribe.

On June 12, 2023 Sian Beilock began her tenure as the first female president of Dartmouth.

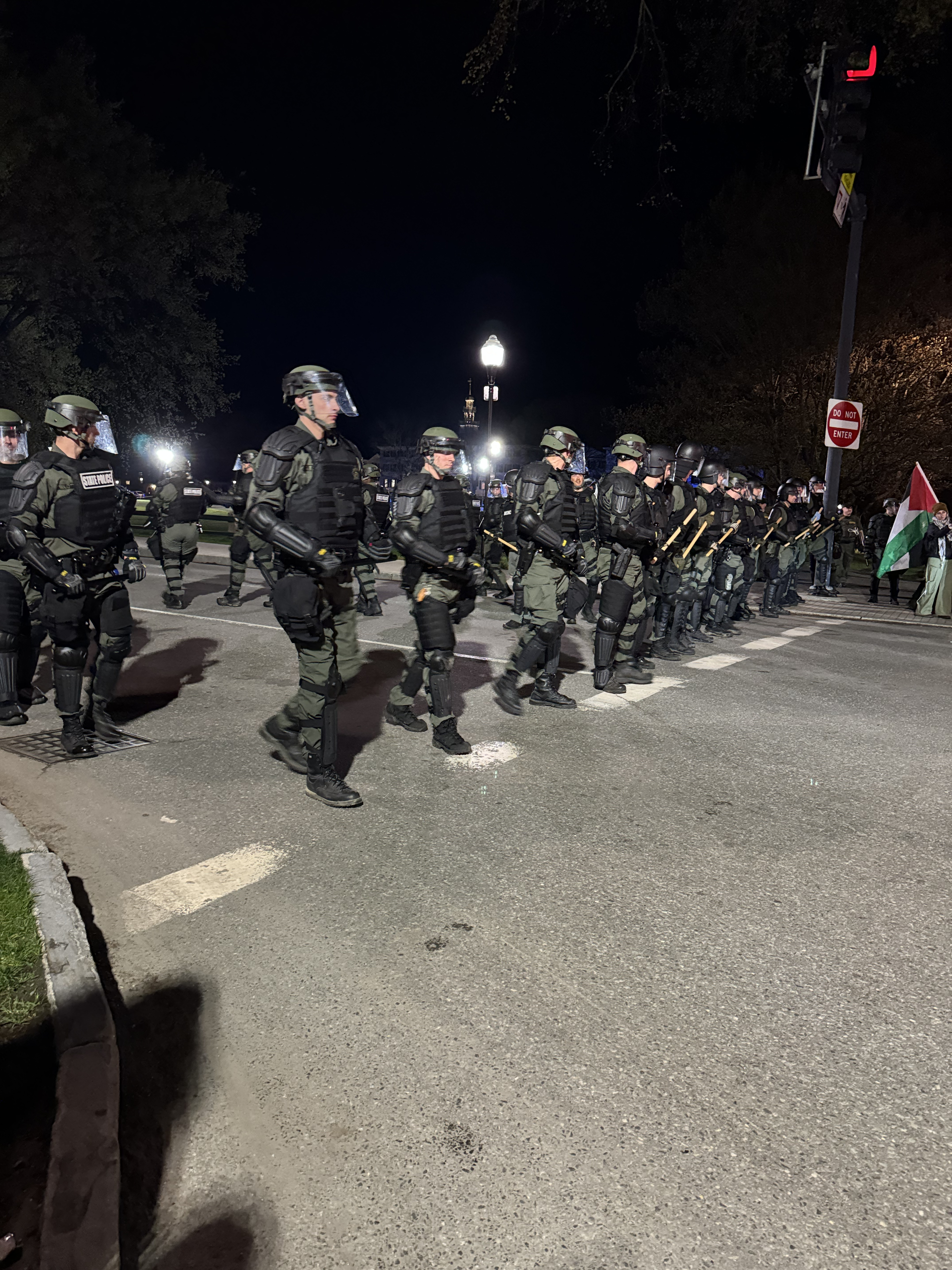
New Hampshire State Police at the May 1st 2024 protests. Over 90 students, faculty, and community members were arrested.

In September 2023, Dartmouth convened an event entitled The Future of Mental Health and Wellness, which included the seven living U.S. Surgeons General at the time. In 2024, the college hired a chief wellness office in order to provide increased mental health support on campus and to help students to manage daily stressors.

In April 2024, Dartmouth announced the creation of the Dartmouth Climate Collaboration, pledging $500 million towards the goal of eliminating carbon emissions on campus by 2050. The plan includes the installation of high-capacity heat pumps and a geoexchange system, making it the largest operational change in the college's history.

In May 2024, about 90 students, faculty and community members who were nonviolently protesting the war in Gaza were taken into custody by the New Hampshire State Police. Two student journalists from The Dartmouth reporting on the protest were among the arrested, though their charges were dropped within days. Following the arrests, the New York Times described Dartmouth as having "stood out for its almost instantaneous response to a nonviolent protest."

== Academics ==
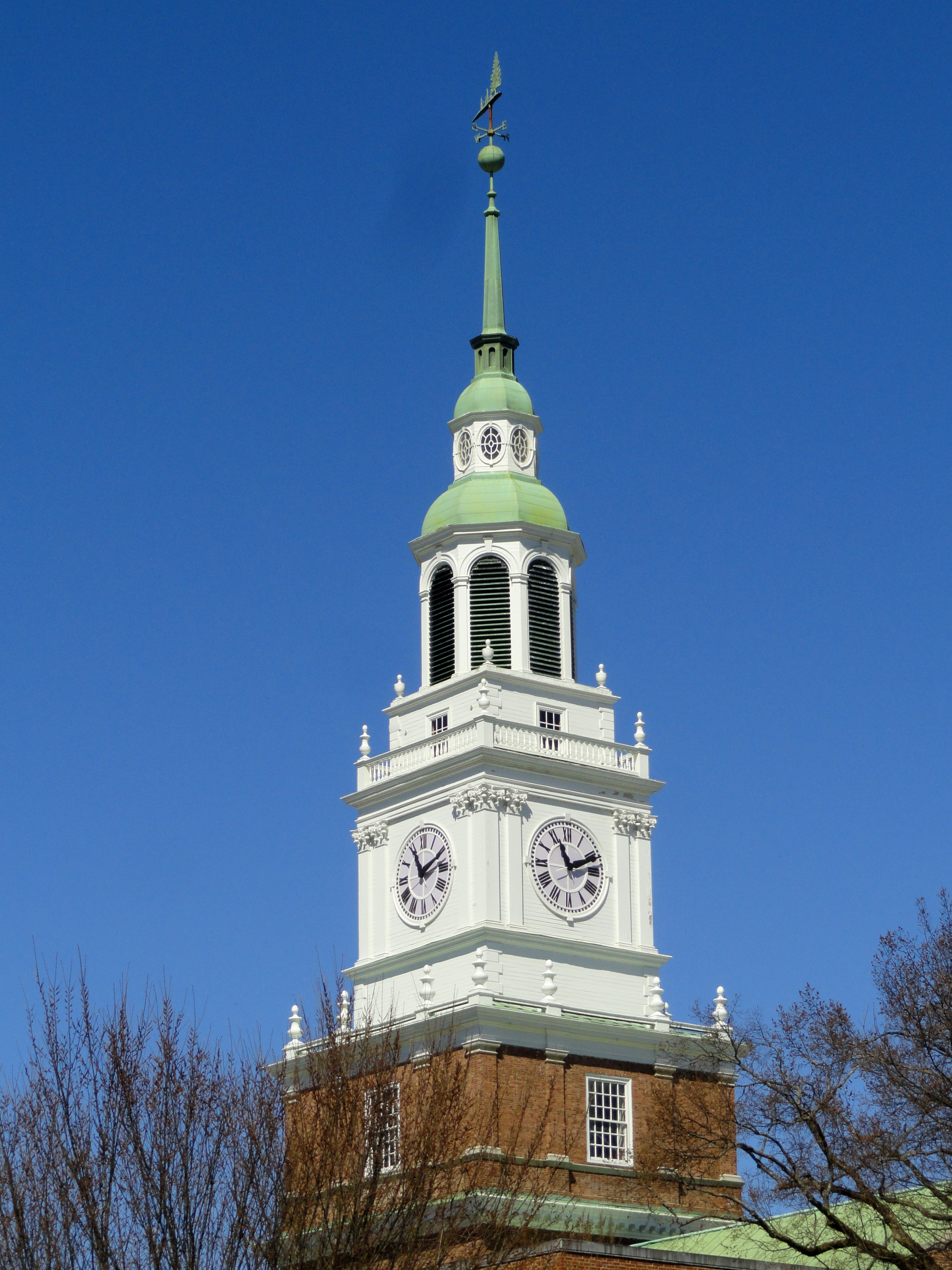
Baker Memorial Library

Dartmouth, a liberal arts institution, offers a four-year Bachelor of Arts and an ABET-accredited Bachelor of Engineering degree to undergraduate students. The college has 39 academic departments offering 56 major programs, while students are free to design special majors or engage in dual majors. For the graduating class of 2017, the most popular majors were economics, government, computer science, engineering sciences, and history. The Economics Department, whose prominent professors include David Blanchflower, Andrew Samwick, and Diego Comin, among others, also holds the distinction as the top-ranked bachelor's-only economics program in the world. The Government Department similarly includes numerous eminent faculty members, such as Stephen Brooks and William Wohlforth, and is among Dartmouth's most popular majors. These two departments are known for enforcing a median grade of B+ in most of their courses in order to curb the burgeoning trend of grade inflation at American universities.

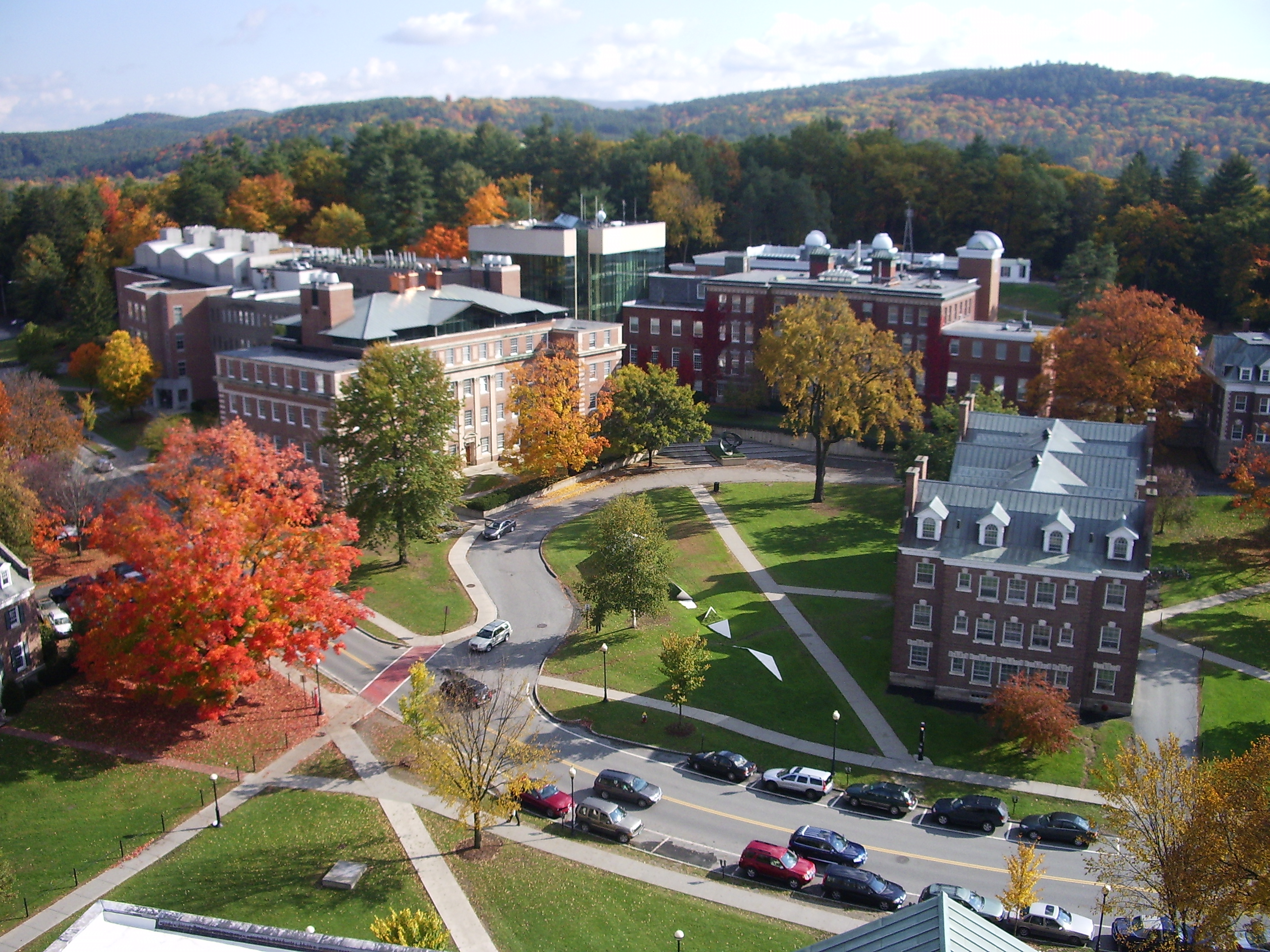
A view of East Campus from Baker Tower

In order to graduate, a student must complete 35 total courses, eight to ten of which are typically part of a chosen major program. Other requirements for graduation include the completion of ten "distributive requirements" in a variety of academic fields, proficiency in a foreign language, and completion of a writing class and first-year seminar in writing. Many departments offer honors programs requiring students seeking that distinction to engage in "independent, sustained work", culminating in the production of a thesis. In addition to the courses offered in Hanover, Dartmouth offers 57 different off-campus programs, including Foreign Study Programs, Language Study Abroad programs, and Exchange Programs.

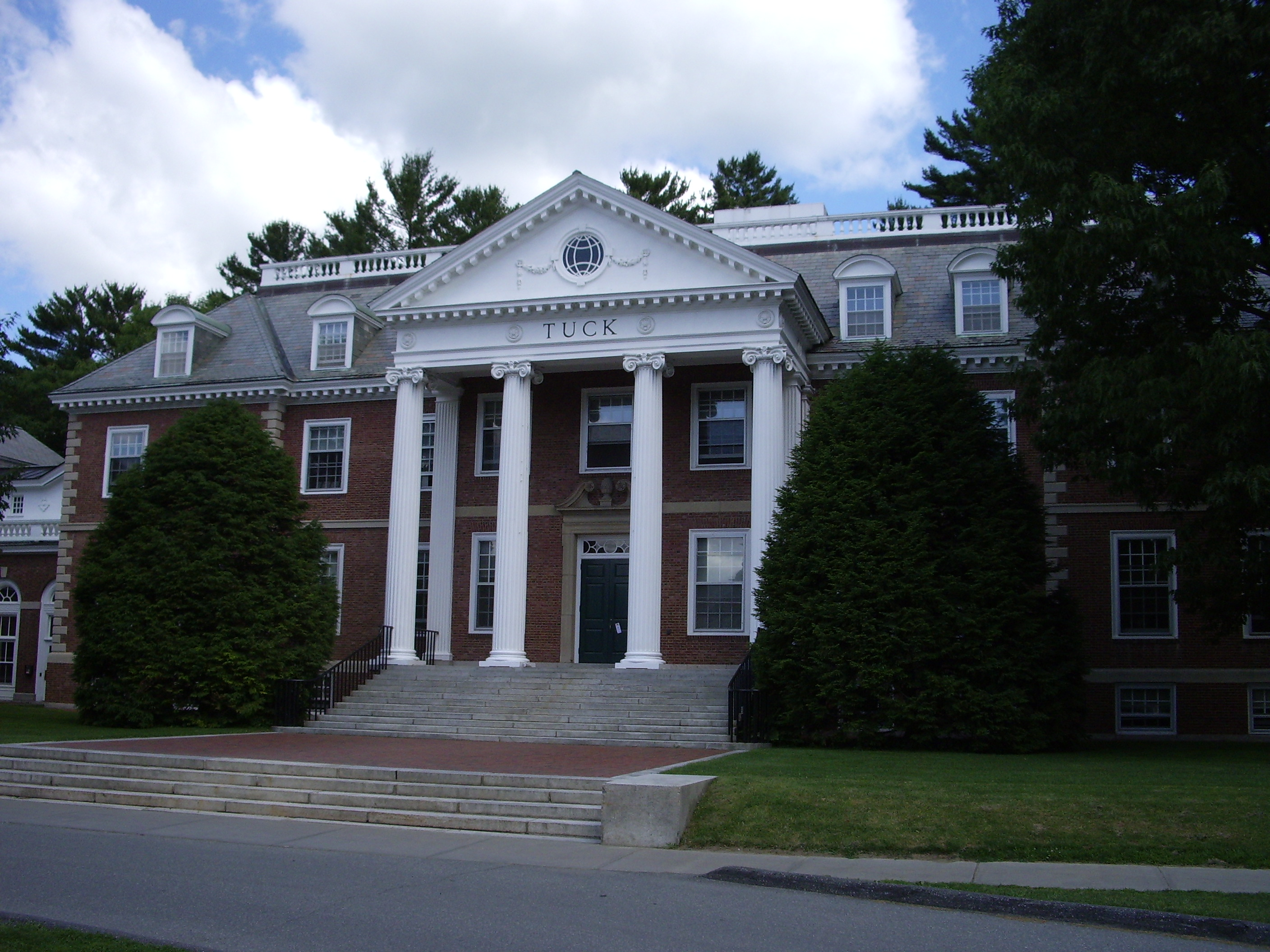
Tuck School of Business

Through the Graduate Studies program, Dartmouth grants doctorate and master's degrees in 19 Arts & Sciences graduate programs. Although the first graduate degree, a PhD in classics, was awarded in 1885, many of the current PhD programs have only existed since the 1960s. Furthermore, Dartmouth is home to three professional schools: the Geisel School of Medicine (established 1797), Thayer School of Engineering (1867)—which also serves as the undergraduate department of engineering sciences—and Tuck School of Business (1900). With these professional schools and graduate programs, conventional American usage would accord Dartmouth the label of "Dartmouth University"; however, because of historical and nostalgic reasons (such as Dartmouth College v. Woodward), the school uses the name "Dartmouth College" to refer to the entire institution.

Dartmouth employs a total of 607 tenured or tenure-track faculty members, including the highest proportion of female tenured professors among the Ivy League universities, and the first black woman tenure-track faculty member in computer science at an Ivy League university.

Dartmouth served as the host member of the University Press of New England from its founding in 1970 until its closure in 2018.

=== Research ===
Dartmouth College is a research institution designated by the Carnegie Classification of Institutions of Higher Education as having "very high research activity". In 2019, Dartmouth College was elected to the Association of American Universities (AAU), an organization of 69 research universities.

Faculty members have been at the forefront of such major academic developments as the Dartmouth Workshop, the Dartmouth Time-Sharing System, Dartmouth BASIC, and Dartmouth ALGOL 30. In 2005, sponsored project awards to Dartmouth faculty research amounted to $169 million.

In 2017, Eric Fossum, a professor of engineering at Dartmouth College, was awarded the Queen Elizabeth Prize for his work on imaging sensor technology. The Pfizer–BioNTech COVID-19 vaccine, which was approved in 2021, was based on findings that originated in a science lab at the college. In 2024, researchers at Dartmouth received a $31.3 million grant from the federal government to further their study of prostate cancer. In 2025, Dartmouth received approximately $97 million worth of funding from the National Institutes of Health.

=== Rankings ===
Academic rankings

National
- Forbes: 16
- U.S. News & World Report: 13 (tie)
- Washington Monthly: 75
- WSJ/College Pulse: 57

Global
- ARWU: 301–400
- QS: 247 (tie)
- THE: 168 (tie)
- U.S. News & World Report: 326 (tie)

USNWR graduate school rankings
Business		6
Engineering		55
Medicine	Primary Care	Tier 1
Medicine	Research	Tier 2

USNWR departmental rankings
Biological Sciences	33
Chemistry	67
Computer Science	43
Earth Sciences	54
Mathematics	53
Physics	61
Psychology	53
Public Health	41

Dartmouth was ranked 12th among undergraduate programs at national universities by U.S. News & World Report in its 2022 rankings. U.S. News also ranked the school 3rd best for veterans, tied for 5th best in undergraduate teaching, and 7th for "best value" national universities. Dartmouth's undergraduate teaching was previously ranked 1st by U.S. News for five years in a row (2009–2013). Dartmouth College is accredited by the New England Commission of Higher Education.

In Forbes' 2019 rankings of 650 universities, liberal arts colleges and service academies, Dartmouth ranked 10th overall and 10th in research universities. In the Forbes 2018 "grateful graduate" rankings, Dartmouth came in first for the second year in a row.

The 2021 Academic Ranking of World Universities ranked Dartmouth among the 90–110th best universities in the nation.

=== Admissions ===
Admissions statistics
- 2023 (Fall) entering class for admissions and GPA; 2020 (Fall) entering class for SAT/ACT, the most recent time it was required
- Admit rate: Overall: 6.23% ED: 19.9% RD: 4.6%

Test scores middle 50%
- SAT EBRW: 710–770
- SAT Math: 730–790
- ACT Composite: 32–35

High school GPA^{[ii]}
- Top 10%: 94.5%
- Top 25%: 98.3%
- Top 50%: 99.8%

Undergraduate admission to Dartmouth College is characterized by the Carnegie Foundation and U.S. News & World Report as "most selective". The Princeton Review, in its 2024 edition, gave the university an admissions selectivity rating of 99 out of 99.

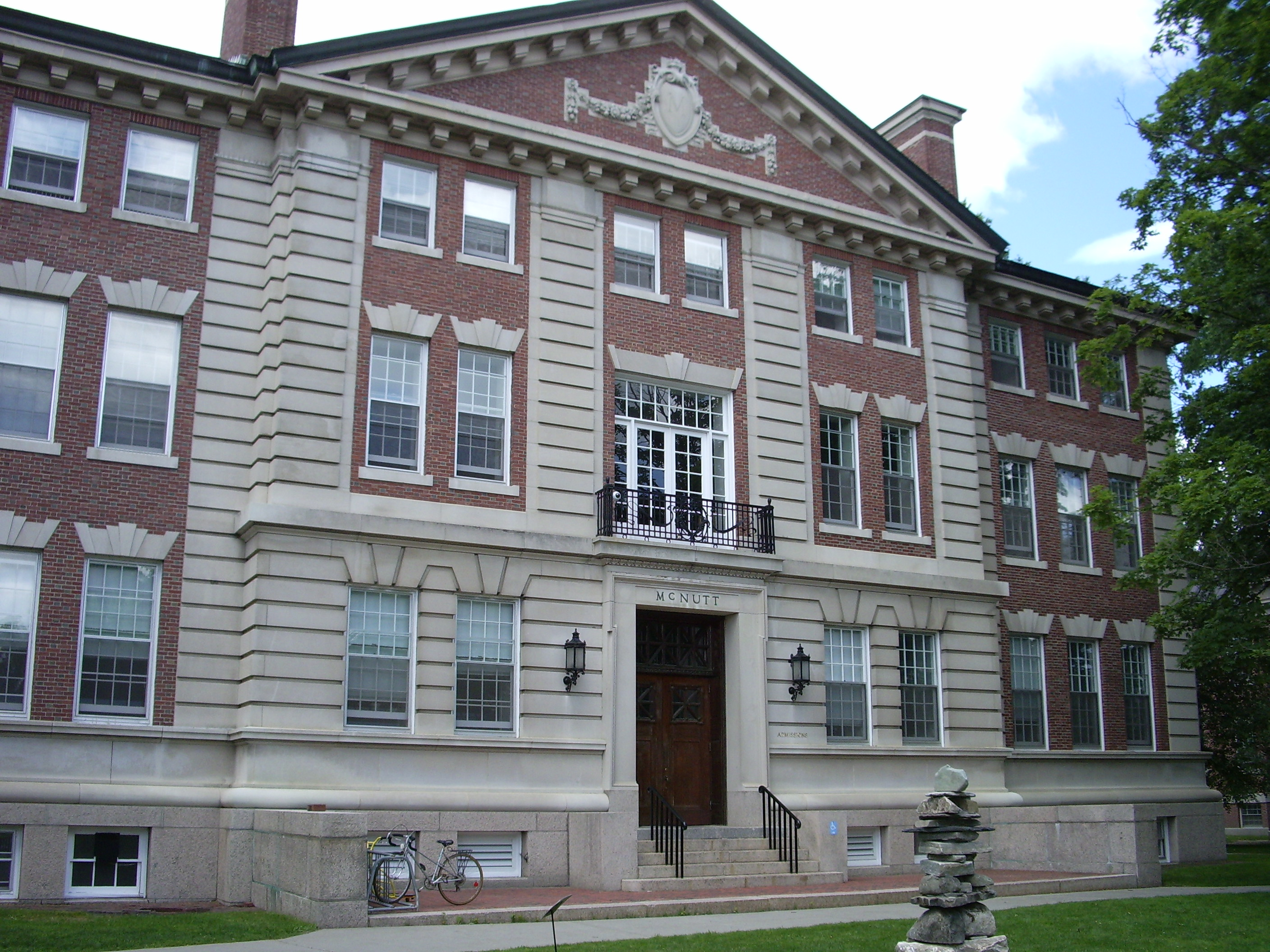
McNutt Hall, home to the Dartmouth Office of Undergraduate Admissions

For the freshman class entering Fall 2023, Dartmouth received a record 28,841 applications of which 6.2% were accepted, consistent with the prior two years; approximately 67% of those accepted are expected to matriculate. Of those admitted students who reported class rank, 444 were ranked first or second in their class, while 96% ranked in the top decile. The admitted students' academic profile showed an all-time high SAT average score of 1501, while the average composite ACT score remained at 33.

Additionally, for the 2016–2017 academic year, Dartmouth received 685 transfer applications of which 5.1% were accepted, with an average SAT composite score of 1490, average composite ACT score of 34, and average college GPA of about 3.85. Dartmouth meets 100% of students' demonstrated financial need in order to attend the college, and currently admits all students, including internationals, on a need-blind basis.

In 2020, Dartmouth made it optional for students applying to the college to submit their SAT scores due to the COVID-19 pandemic. In 2024, the college became the first Ivy League school to announce that it would once again require applicants to submit their test scores.

=== Financial aid ===
Dartmouth guarantees to meet 100% of the demonstrated need of every admitted student who applies for financial aid at the time of admission. Dartmouth is one of seven American universities to practice international need-blind admissions. This means that all applicants, including U.S. permanent residents, undocumented students in the U.S., and international students, are admitted to the college without regard to their financial circumstances. At Dartmouth, free tuition is provided for students from families with total incomes of $125,000 or less and possessing typical assets. Dartmouth is also one of a few U.S. universities to eliminate undergraduate student loans and replace them with expanded scholarship grants. In 2015, $88.8 million (~$118 million in 2025) in need-based scholarships were awarded to Dartmouth students.

The median family income of Dartmouth students is $200,400, with 58% of students coming from the top 10% highest-earning families and 14% from the bottom 60%.

However, a 2022 article from The Dartmouth disputes the college's claims by saying the following: "To put it all together with the $9 million of student debt from the Class of 2021, this change in Dartmouth policy, hailed as "eliminat[ing] loans for undergraduate students" actually eliminated only about a quarter—27.4% to be exact—of student loans for undergraduate students. So, while Dartmouth gets glowing coverage in news publications across the country, 72.6% of the debt it saddles its students with remains."

In March 2024, the estate of Glenn Britt gifted over $150 million to Dartmouth to enable students from middle-income families to attend the college for free.

=== The Dartmouth Plan ===
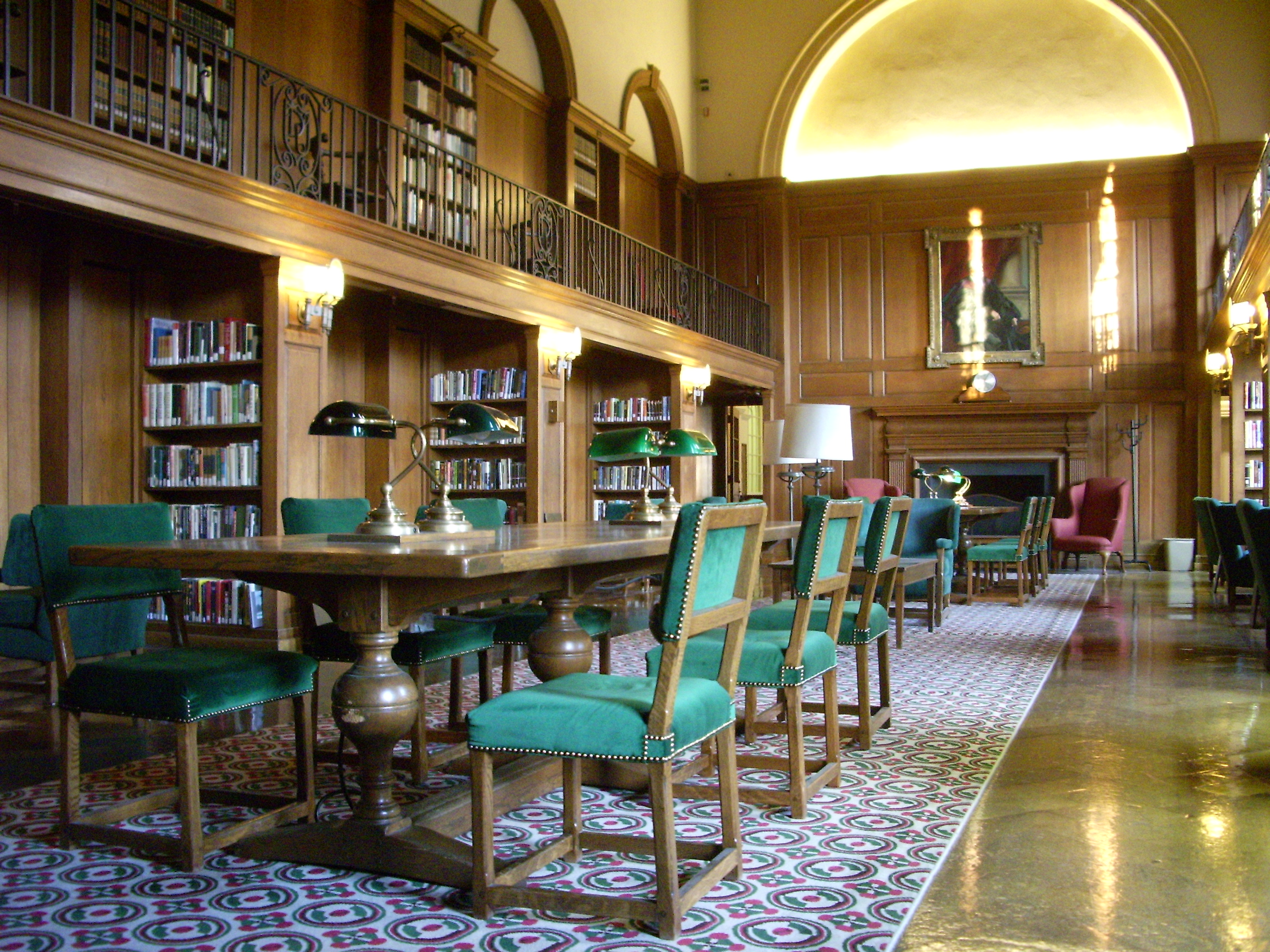
Tower Room in Baker Memorial Library

Dartmouth functions on a quarter system, operating year-round on four ten-week academic terms. The Dartmouth Plan (or simply "D-Plan") is an academic scheduling system that permits the customization of each student's academic year. All undergraduates are required to be in residence for the fall, winter, and spring terms of their freshman year and two terms of their senior year, as well as the summer term of their sophomore year. However, students may petition to alter this plan so that they may be off during terms of their senior year or sophomore summer terms. During all terms, students are permitted to choose between studying on-campus, studying at an off-campus program, or taking a term off for vacation, outside internships, or research projects. The typical course load is three classes per term, and students will generally enroll in classes for 12 total terms over the course of their academic career.

The D-Plan was instituted in the early 1970s at the same time that Dartmouth began accepting female undergraduates. It was initially devised as a plan to increase the enrollment without enlarging campus accommodations, and has been described as "a way to put 4,000 students into 3,000 beds". Although new dormitories have been built since, the number of students has also increased and the D-Plan remains in effect. It was modified in the 1980s in an attempt to reduce the problems of lack of social and academic continuity.

=== Board of trustees ===
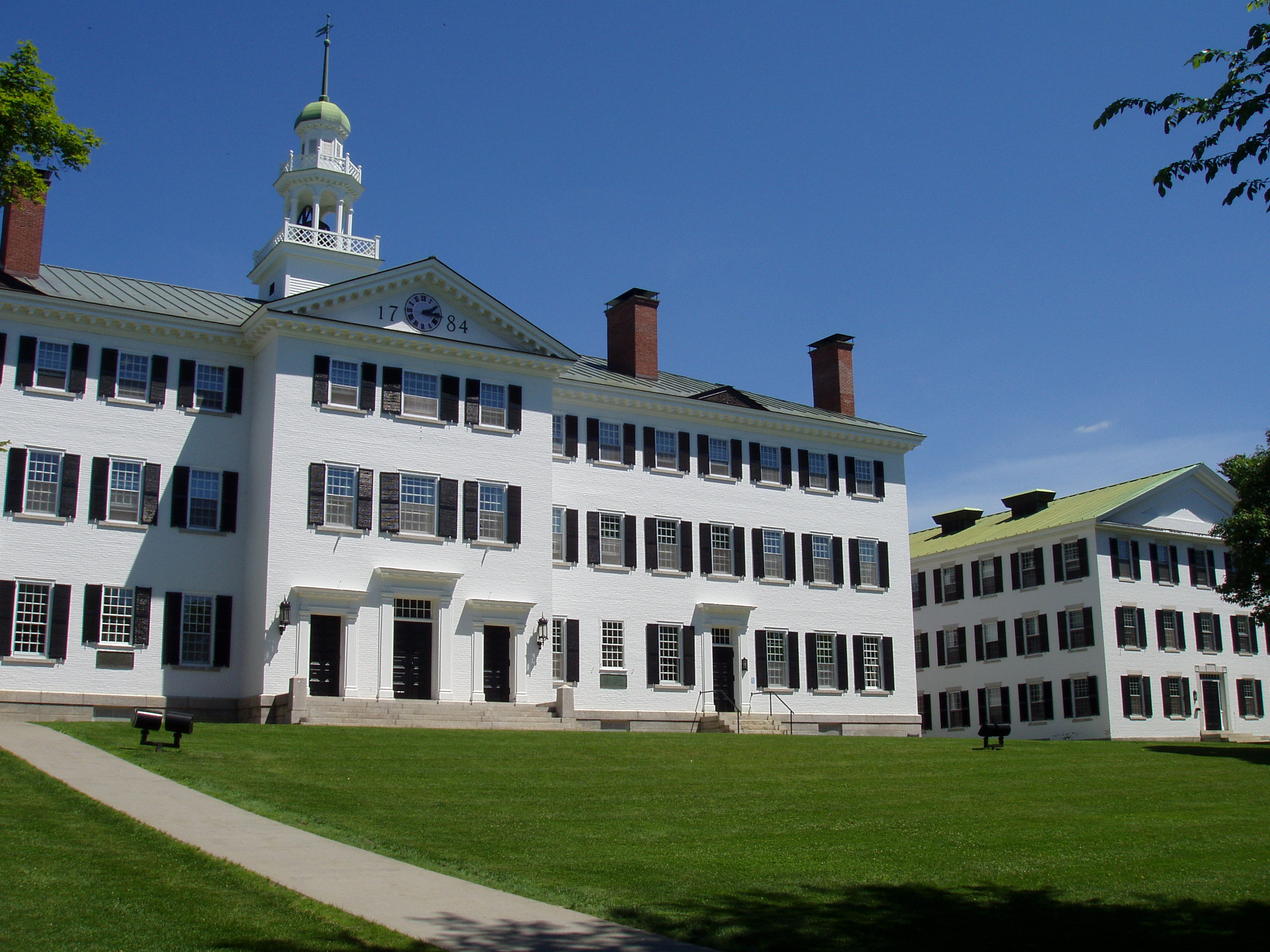
Dartmouth Hall was reconstructed in 1906.

Dartmouth is governed by a board of trustees comprising the college president (ex officio), the state governor (ex officio), 13 trustees nominated and elected by the board (called "charter trustees"), and eight trustees nominated by alumni and elected by the board ("alumni trustees"). The nominees for alumni trustee are determined by a poll of the members of the Association of Alumni of Dartmouth College, selecting from among names put forward by the Alumni Council or by alumni petition.

Although the board elected its members from the two sources of nominees in equal proportions between 1891 and 2007, the board decided in 2007 to add several new members, all charter trustees. In the controversy that followed the decision, the Association of Alumni filed a lawsuit, although it later withdrew the action. In 2008, the board added five new charter trustees.

=== International collaboration ===
The college is an active member of the University of the Arctic. UArctic is an international cooperative network based in the Circumpolar Arctic region, consisting of more than 200 universities, colleges, and other organizations with an interest in promoting education and research in the Arctic region.

== Campus ==
This is what a college is supposed to look like.

— U.S. President Dwight D. Eisenhower, 1953

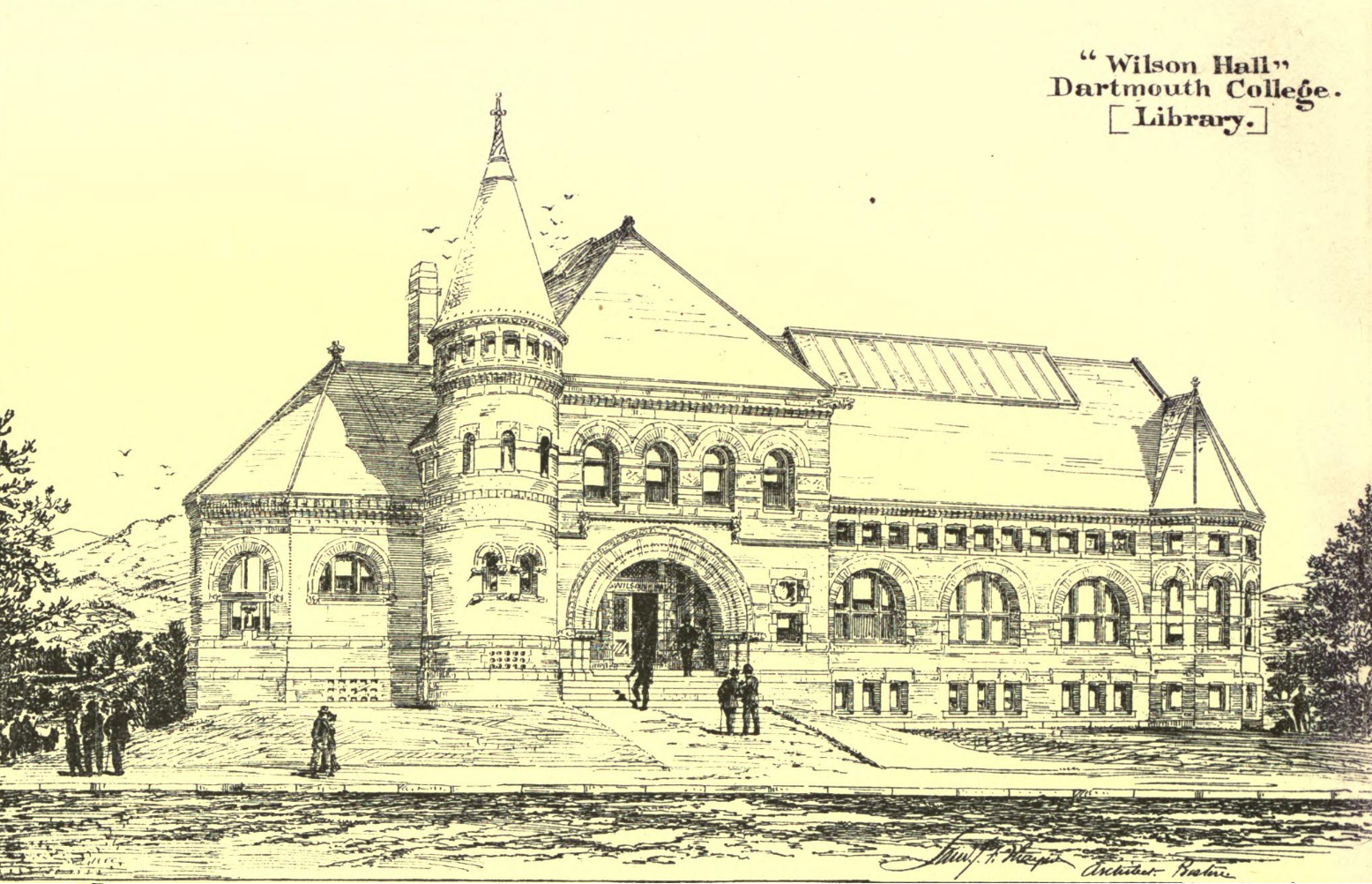
Drawing of Wilson Hall, Dartmouth's first library building, by architect Samuel J. F. Thayer (1842–1893), which appeared in American Architect and Building News in March 1885.

Dartmouth College is situated in the rural town of Hanover, New Hampshire, located in the Upper Valley along the Connecticut River in New England. Its 269-acre (1.09 km^{2}) campus is centered on a 5-acre (2 ha) "Green", a former field of pine trees cleared in 1771. Dartmouth is the largest private landowner of the town of Hanover, and its total landholdings and facilities are worth an estimated $434 million. In addition to its campus in Hanover, Dartmouth owns 4,500 acres (18 km^{2}) of Mount Moosilauke in the White Mountains and a 27,000-acre (110 km^{2}) tract of land in northern New Hampshire known as the Second College Grant.

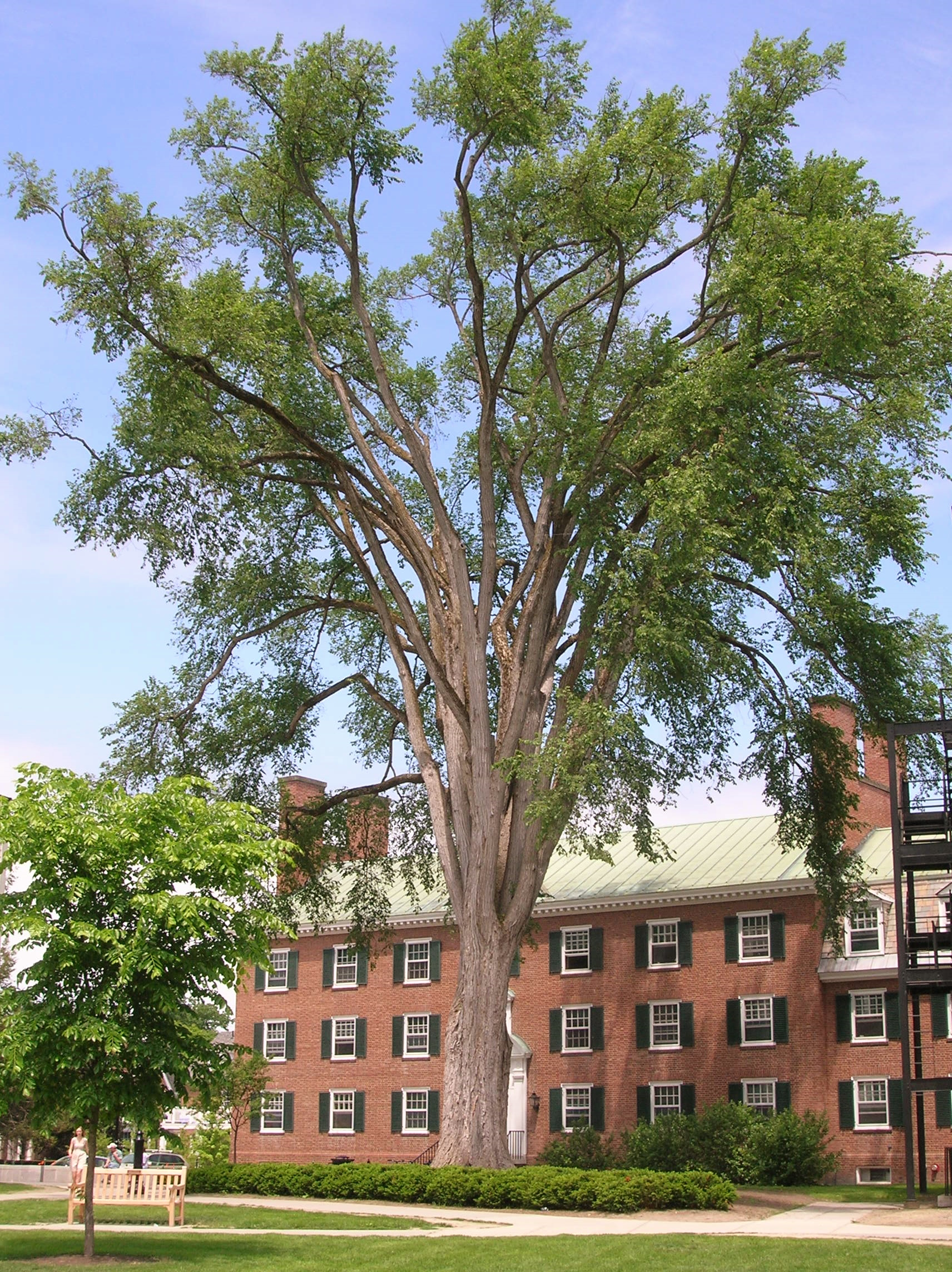
American elm on Dartmouth College campus, June 2011

Dartmouth's campus buildings vary in age from Wentworth and Thornton Halls of the 1820s (the oldest surviving buildings constructed by the college) to new dormitories and mathematics facilities completed in 2006. Most of Dartmouth's buildings are designed in the Georgian colonial architecture style, a theme which has been preserved in recent architectural additions. The college has actively sought to reduce carbon emissions and energy usage on campus, earning it the grade of A− from the Sustainable Endowments Institute on its College Sustainability Report Card 2008.

A notable feature of the Dartmouth campus is its many trees which (despite Dutch elm disease) include some 200 American elms. The campus also has the largest Kentucky coffeetree in New Hampshire, at 91 ft tall.

While Dartmouth's campus is located in a rural setting, it is connected to several major cities by intercity bus services that directly serve Dartmouth and Hanover. Dartmouth Coach provides service from Hanover to South Station and Logan International Airport in Boston as well as New York City, while Greyhound Lines operates a daily route connecting Hanover and Montreal. All three cities are popular weekend/vacation destinations for Dartmouth students.

=== Academic facilities ===
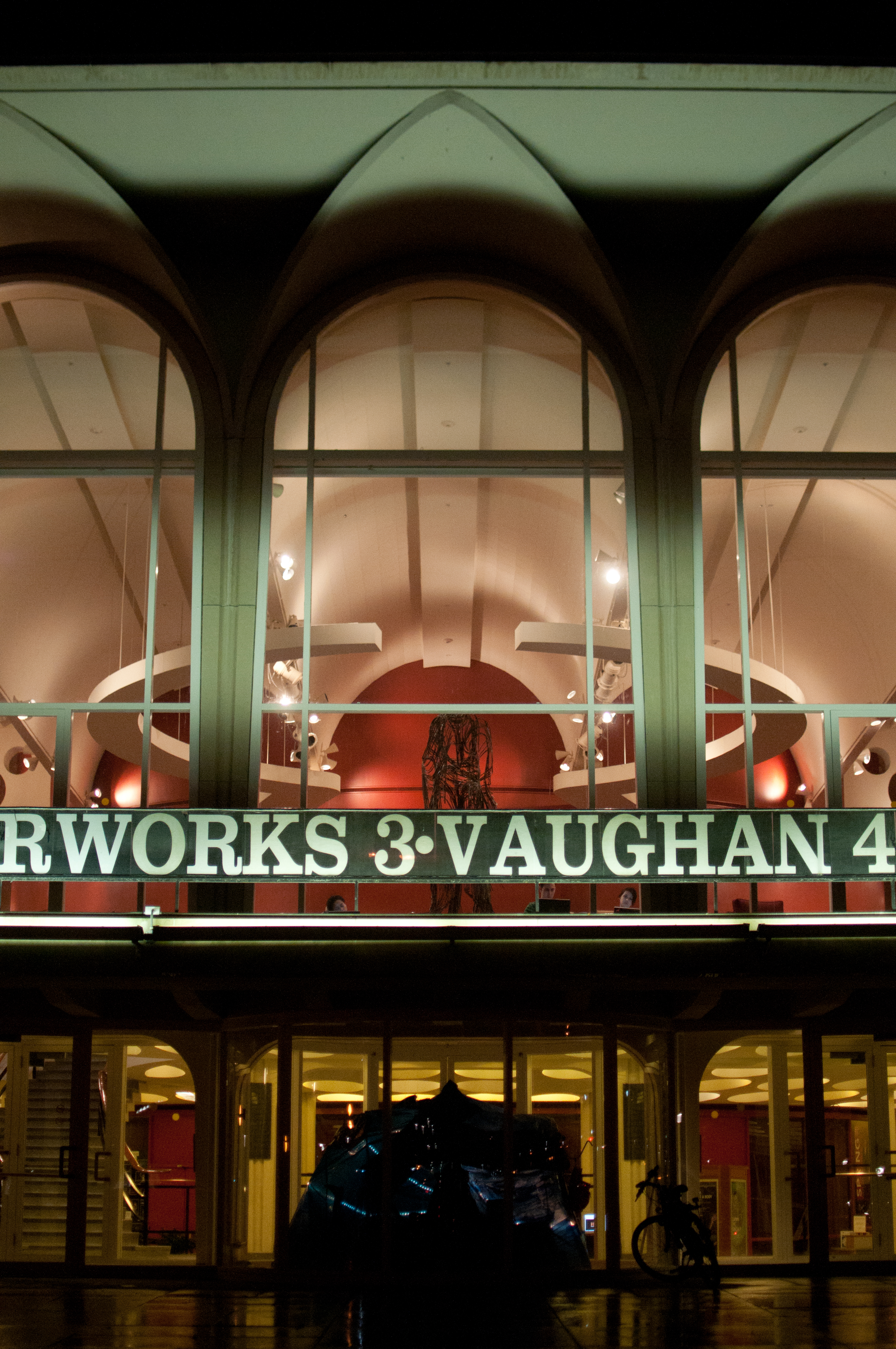
The Hopkins Center

The college's creative and performing arts facility is the Hopkins Center for the Arts ("the Hop"). Opened in 1962, the Hop houses the college's drama, music, film, and studio arts departments, as well as a woodshop, pottery studio, and jewelry studio which are open for use by students and faculty. The building was designed by the famed architect Wallace Harrison, who would later design the similar-looking façade of Manhattan's Metropolitan Opera House at Lincoln Center. Its facilities include two theaters and one 900-seat auditorium and the Courtyard Café dining facility. The Hop is connected to the Hood Museum of Art, arguably North America's oldest museum in continuous operation, and the Loew Auditorium, where films are screened.

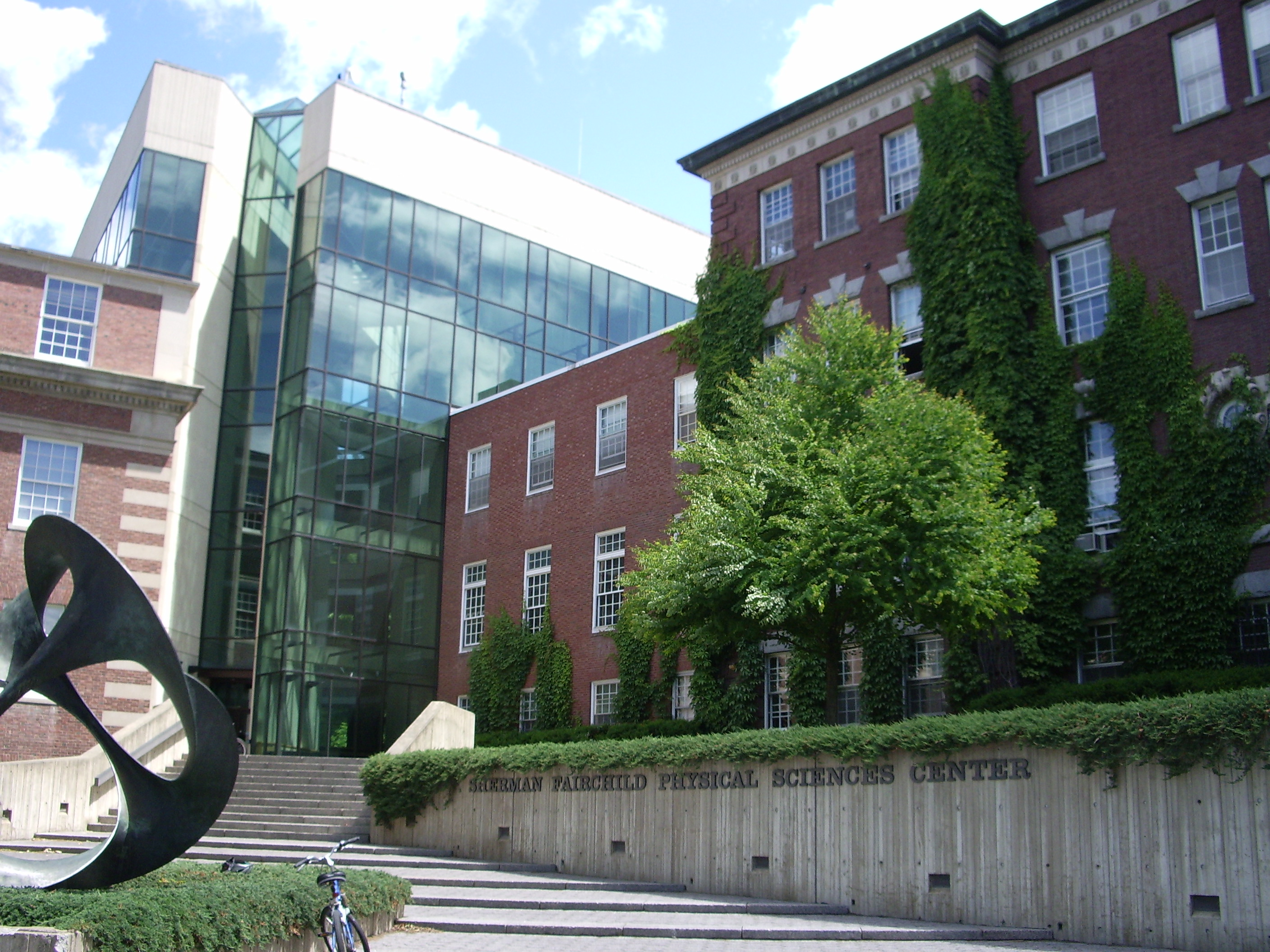
Sherman Fairchild Physical Sciences Center

In addition to its 19 graduate programs in the arts and sciences, Dartmouth is home to three separate graduate schools. The Geisel School of Medicine is located in a complex on the north side of campus and includes laboratories, classrooms, offices, and a biomedical library. The Dartmouth–Hitchcock Medical Center, located several miles to the south in Lebanon, New Hampshire, contains a 396-bed teaching hospital for the Medical School. The Thayer School of Engineering and the Tuck School of Business are both located at the end of Tuck Mall, west of the center of campus and near the Connecticut River. The Thayer School comprises two buildings; Tuck has seven academic and administrative buildings, as well as several common areas. The two graduate schools share a library, the Feldberg Business & Engineering Library. In December 2018, Dartmouth began a major expansion of the west end of campus by breaking ground on the $200 million (~$252 million in 2025) Center for Engineering and Computer Science. The center will house the Computer Science department and Magnuson Center for Entrepreneurship. In October 2019, construction began on the Irving Institute of Energy and Society. Both were completed by Spring 2022, and the Center for Engineering and Computer Science was renamed the Class of 1982 Engineering and Computer Science Center.

Dartmouth's libraries are all part of the collective Dartmouth College Library, which comprises 2.48 million volumes and 6 million total resources, including videos, maps, sound recordings, and photographs. Its specialized libraries include the Biomedical Libraries, Evans Map Room, Feldberg Business & Engineering Library, Jones Media Center, Rauner Special Collections Library, and Sherman Art Library. Baker-Berry Library is the main library at Dartmouth, consisting of a merger of the Baker Memorial Library (opened 1928) and the Berry Library (completed 2002). Located on the northern side of the Green, Baker's 200-foot (61 m) tower is an iconic symbol of the college.

=== Athletic facilities ===
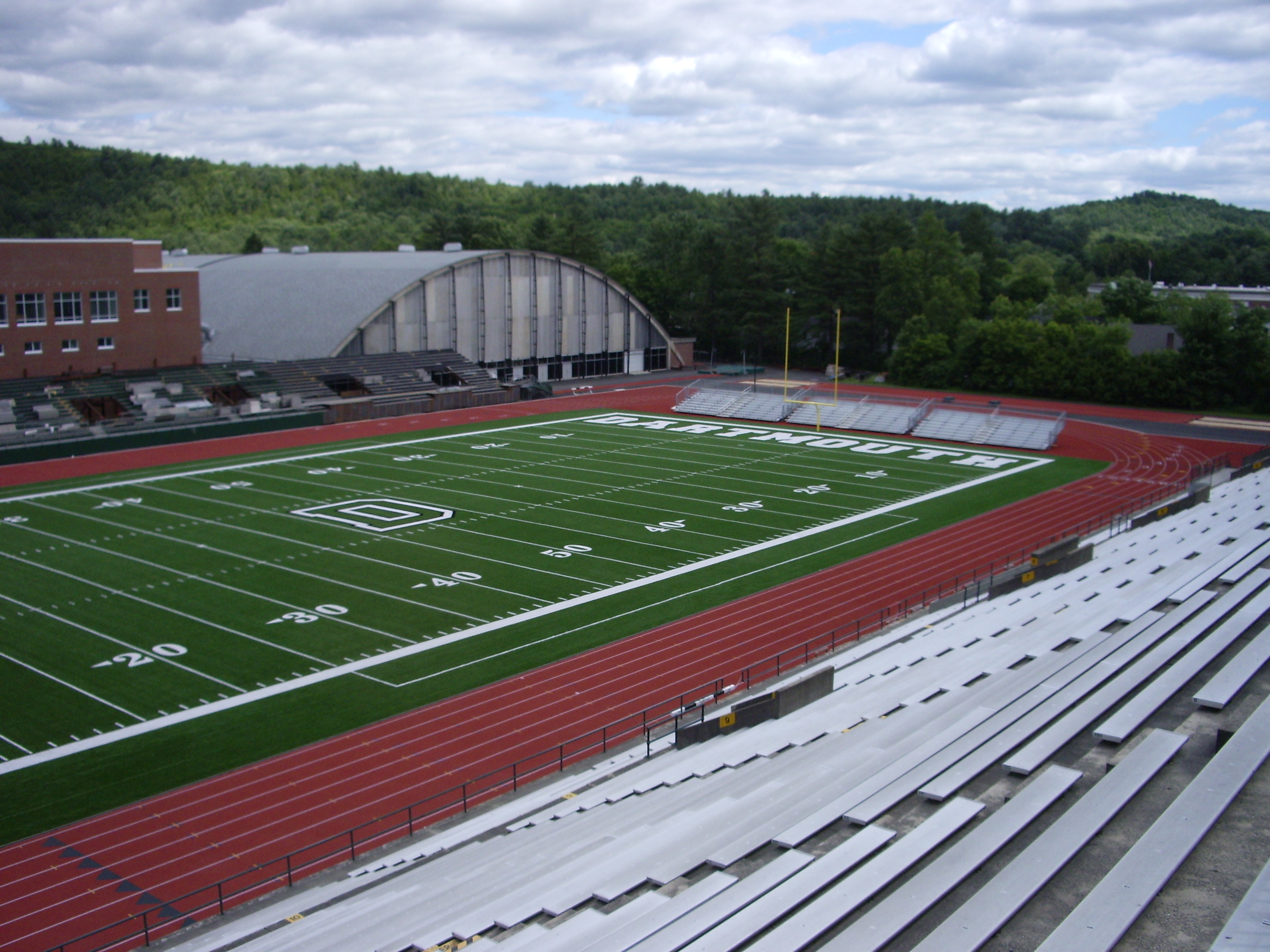
Memorial Field

Dartmouth's original sports field was the Green, where students played cricket and old division football during the 19th century. Today, two of Dartmouth's athletic facilities are located in the southeast corner of campus. The center of athletic life is the Alumni Gymnasium, which includes the Karl Michael Competition Pool and the Spaulding Pool, a fitness center, a weight room, and a 1/13th-mile (123 m) indoor track. Attached to Alumni Gymnasium is the Berry Sports Center, which contains basketball and volleyball courts (Leede Arena), as well as the Kresge Fitness Center. Behind the Alumni Gymnasium is Memorial Field, a 15,600-seat stadium overlooking Dartmouth's football field and track. The nearby Thompson Arena, designed by Italian engineer Pier Luigi Nervi and constructed in 1975, houses Dartmouth's ice rink. Also visible from Memorial Field is the 91,800-square-foot (8,530 m^{2}) Nathaniel Leverone Fieldhouse, home to the indoor track. The new softball field, Dartmouth Softball Park, was constructed in 2012, sharing parking facilities with Thompson arena and replacing Sachem Field, located over a mile from campus, as the primary softball facility.

Dartmouth's other athletic facilities in Hanover include the Friends of Dartmouth Rowing Boathouse and the old rowing house storage facility (both located along the Connecticut River), the Hanover Country Club, Dartmouth's oldest remaining athletic facility (established in 1899), and the Corey Ford Rugby Clubhouse. The college also maintains the Dartmouth Skiway, a 100-acre (0.40 km^{2}) skiing facility located over two mountains near the Hanover campus in Lyme Center, New Hampshire, that serves as the winter practice grounds for the Dartmouth Ski Team, which is a perennial contender for the NCAA Division I championship.

Dartmouth's close association and involvement in the development of the downhill skiing industry is featured in the 2010 book Passion for Skiing as well as the 2013 documentary based on the book Passion for Snow.

=== Residential housing and student life facilities ===
Beginning in the fall term of 2016, Dartmouth placed all undergraduate students in one of six House communities, similar to residential colleges, including Allen House, East Wheelock House, North Park House, School House, South House, and West House, alongside independent Living Learning Communities. Dartmouth used to have nine residential communities located throughout campus, instead of ungrouped dormitories or residential colleges. The dormitories varied in design from modern to traditional Georgian styles, and room arrangements range from singles to quads and apartment suites. Since 2006, the college has guaranteed housing for students during their freshman and sophomore years. More than 3,000 students elect to live in housing provided by college.

In November 2022, Dartmouth Hall was rededicated after a $42 million renovation. Fundraising for the project was led by over 1700 alumnae as part of the celebration of 50 years of coeducation at Dartmouth College.

Campus meals are served by Dartmouth Dining Services, which operates 11 dining establishments around campus. The Class of 1953 Commons, commonly referred to as "Foco", is the all-you-can-eat dining hall, located at the center of campus. Dartmouth also operates à la carte cafes around campus (Collis Café, Courtyard Café, Novack Café, The Fern Coffee & Tea Bar, Ramekin, and Café@Baker), a convenience store (Collis Market), and three snack bars located in the Allen House Commons (also called the "Cube"), McLaughlin Cluster, and East Wheelock Cluster.

The Collis Center is the center of student life and programming, serving as what would be generically termed the "student union" or "campus center". It contains a café, study space, common areas, and a number of administrative departments, including the Academic Skills Center. Robinson Hall, next door to both the Collis Center and the Class of 1953 Commons, contains the offices of a number of student organizations, including the Dartmouth Outing Club and The Dartmouth daily newspaper.

==== House communities ====
Name	Founded	Total capacity	Main location capacity	Main location buildings	Freshman buildings	Color
Allen House	2016	426	257	Gile Hall, Streeter Hall, Lord Hall	Bissell Hall, Cohen Hall	Red
East Wheelock House	2016	327	327	Andres Hall, Zimmerman Hall, Morton Hall, McCulloch Hall		Orange
North Park House	2016	214	137	Thomas Hall, Goldstein Hall, Byrne II Hall, Rauner Hall, Bildner Hall, Berry Hall		Dark Blue
School House	2016	561	333	North, Mid- and South Massachusetts Halls, Hitchcock Hall	Brown Hall, Little Hall, Wheeler Hall	Light Blue
South House	2016	592	366	Topliff Hall, New Hampshire Hall, The Lodge	North, Mid- and South Fayerweather Halls, Richardson Hall	Black
West House	2016	520	335	Russell Sage Hall, Butterfield Hall, Fahey Hall, McLane Hall	French Hall, Judge Hall	Purple

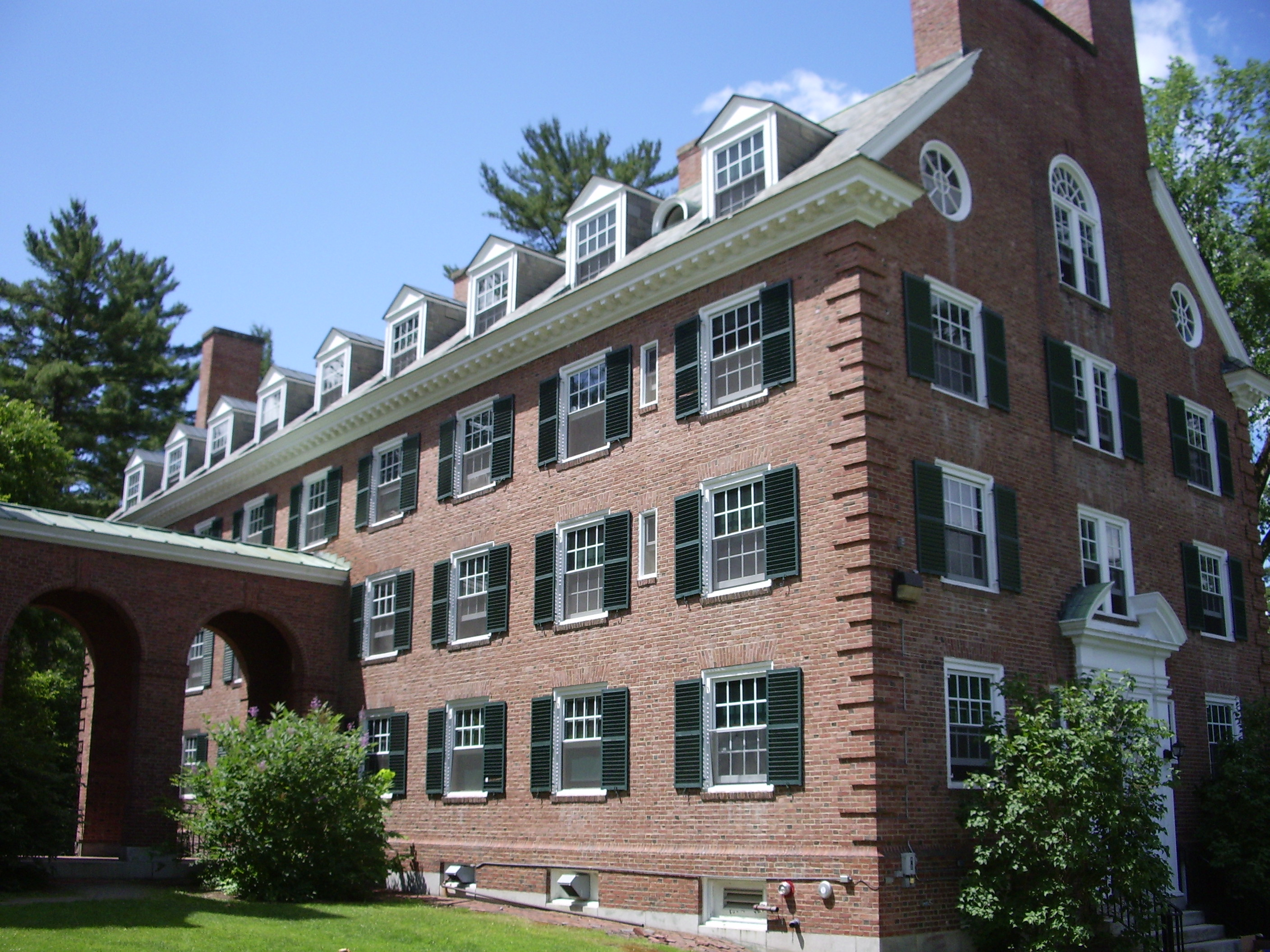
Lord Hall, Allen House

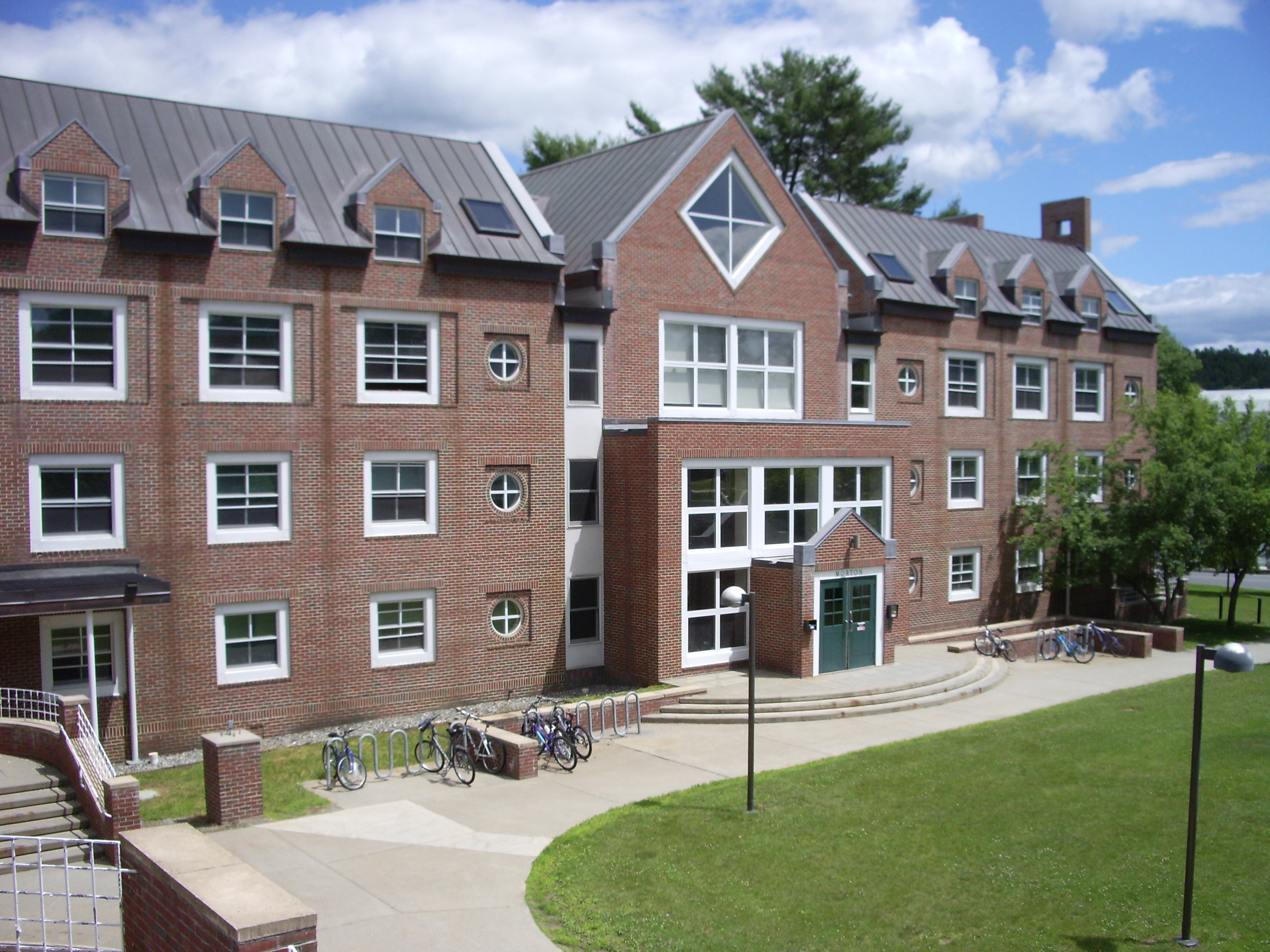
Morton Hall, East Wheelock House

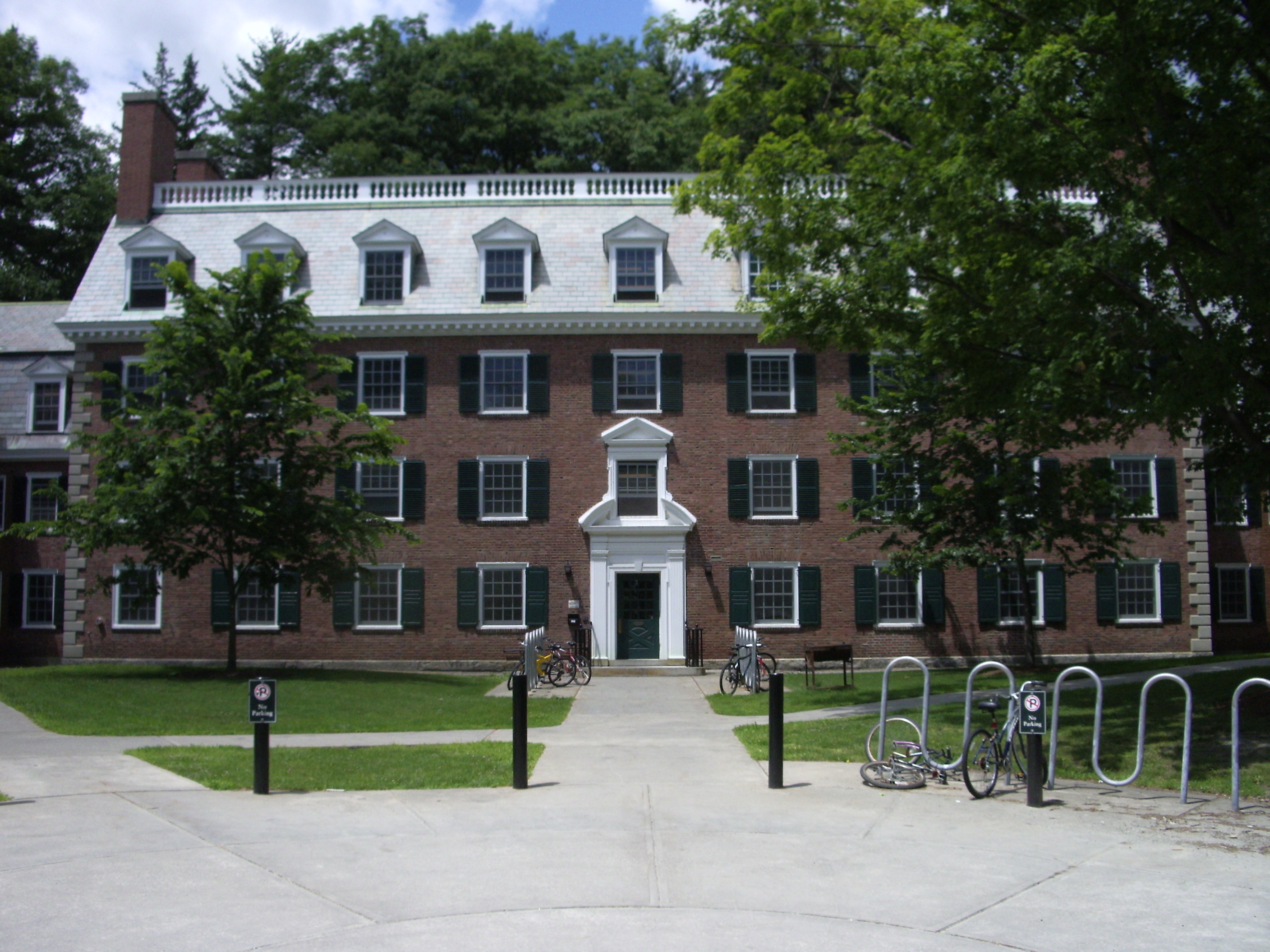
Woodward Hall, North Park House

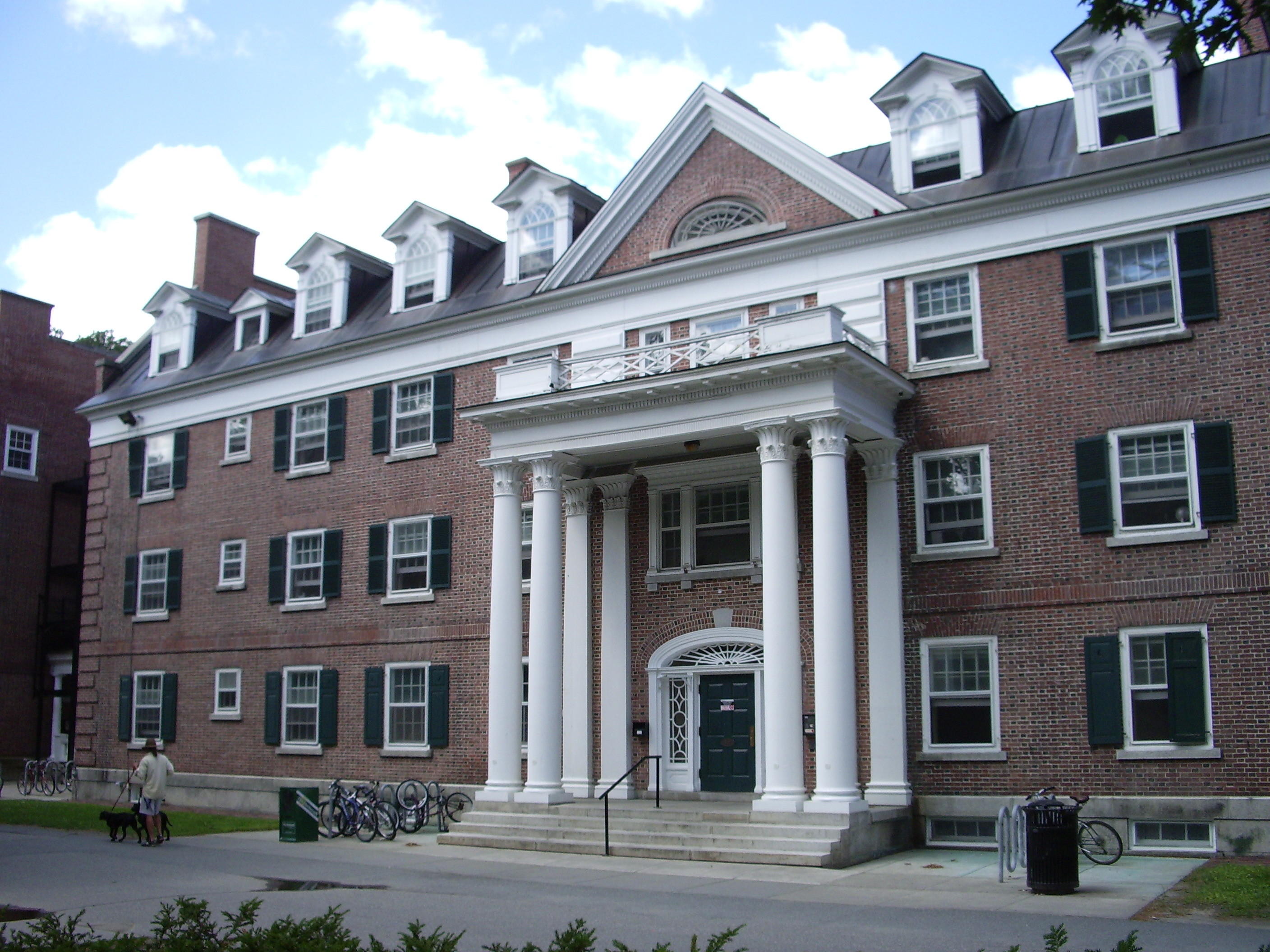
Mid Massachusetts Hall, School House

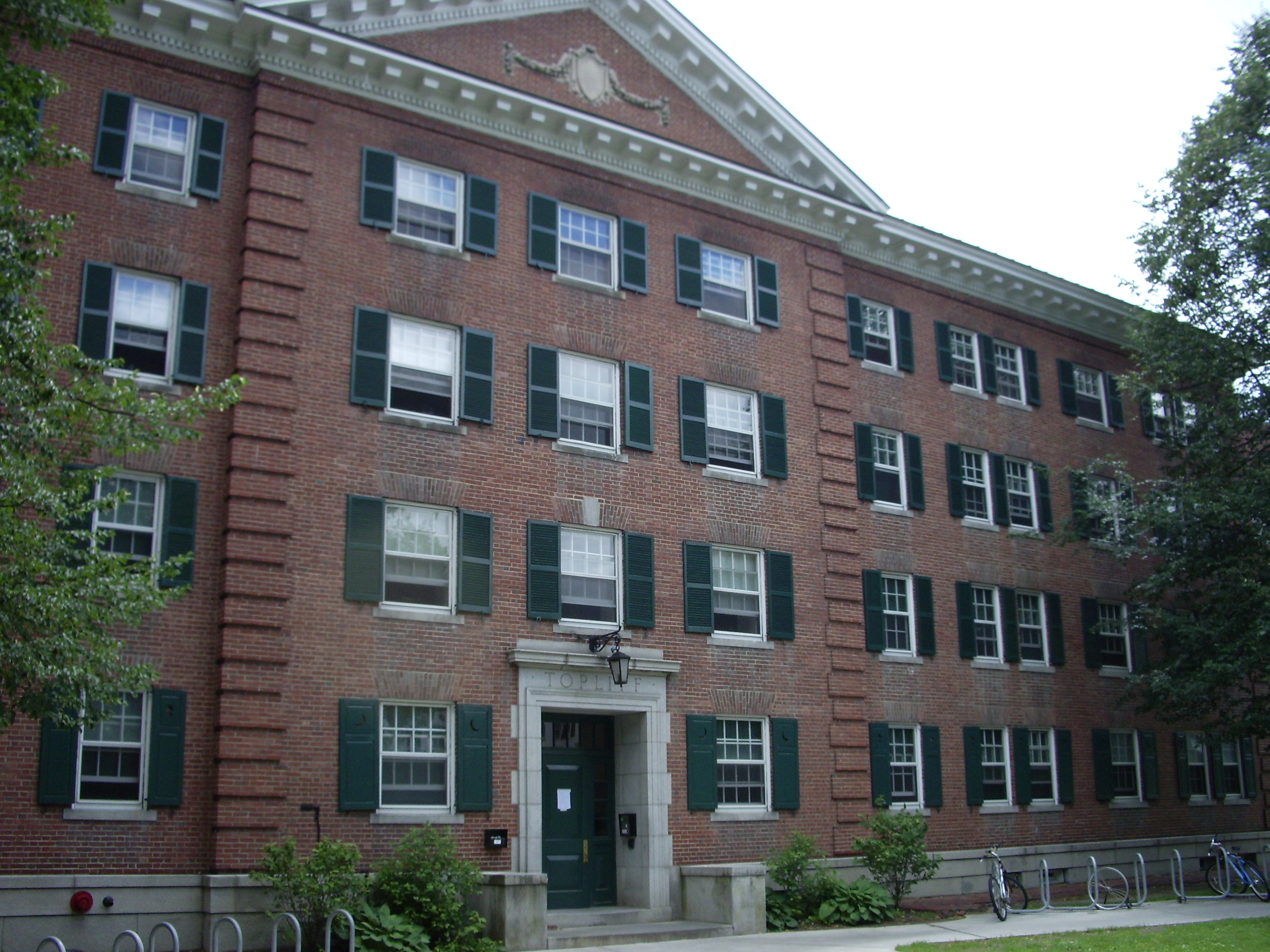
Topliff Hall, South House

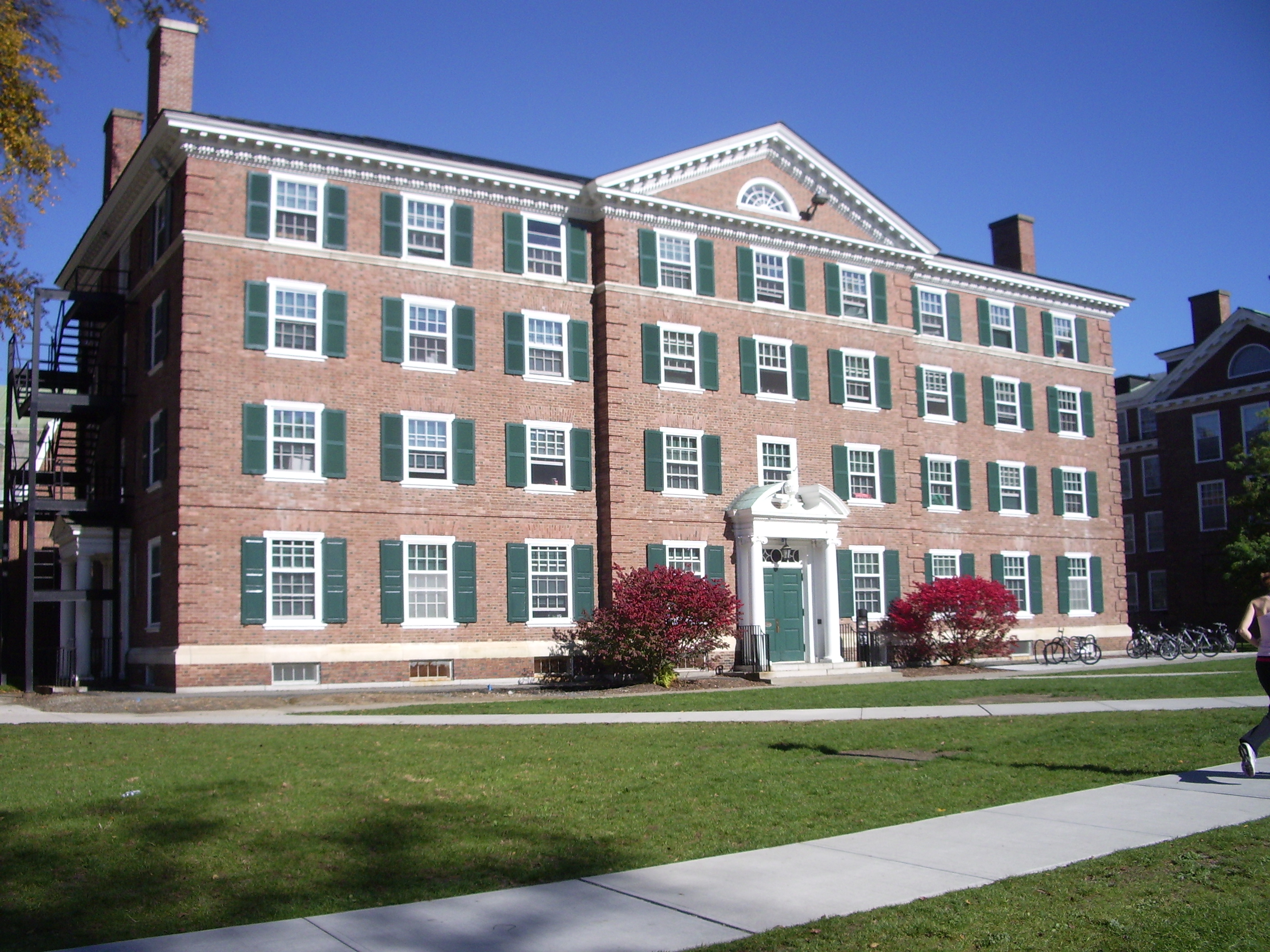
Russell Sage Hall, West House

== Student life ==
Student body composition as of May 2, 2022
Race and ethnicity	Total
White	49%
Asian	15%
Foreign national	11%
Hispanic	10%
Other (Note: Other consists of Multiracial Americans & those who prefer to not say.)	8%
Black	6%
Native American	1%
Economic diversity
Low-income (Note: The percentage of students who received an income-based federal Pell grant intended for low-income students.)	15%
Affluent (Note: The percentage of students who are a part of the American middle class at the bare minimum.)	85%

Dartmouth Student Government represents students on issues related to student life. Annually, students elect a student body president, vice president, and undergraduate senate to represent them in the following academic year. In 2006, The Princeton Review ranked Dartmouth third in its "Quality of Life" category, and sixth for having the "Happiest Students". Athletics and participation in the Greek system are the most popular campus activities. In all, Dartmouth offers more than 350 organizations, teams, and sports. The school is also home to a variety of longstanding traditions and celebrations and has a loyal alumni network; Dartmouth ranked #2 in "The Princeton Review" in 2006 for Best Alumni Network.

In 2014, Dartmouth College was the third highest in the nation in "total of reports of rape" on their main campus, with 42 reports of rape. The Washington Post attributed the high number of rape reports to the fact that a growing number of sexual assault victims feel comfortable enough to report sexual assaults that would have gone unreported in previous years. In 2015, the Huffington Post reported that Dartmouth had the highest rate of bystander intervention of any college surveyed, with 57.7% of Dartmouth students reporting that they would take some sort of action if they saw someone acting in a "sexually violent or harassing manner," compared to 45.5% of students nationally.

Dartmouth fraternities have an extensive history of hazing and alcohol abuse, leading to police raids and accusations of sexual harassment.

=== Student groups ===
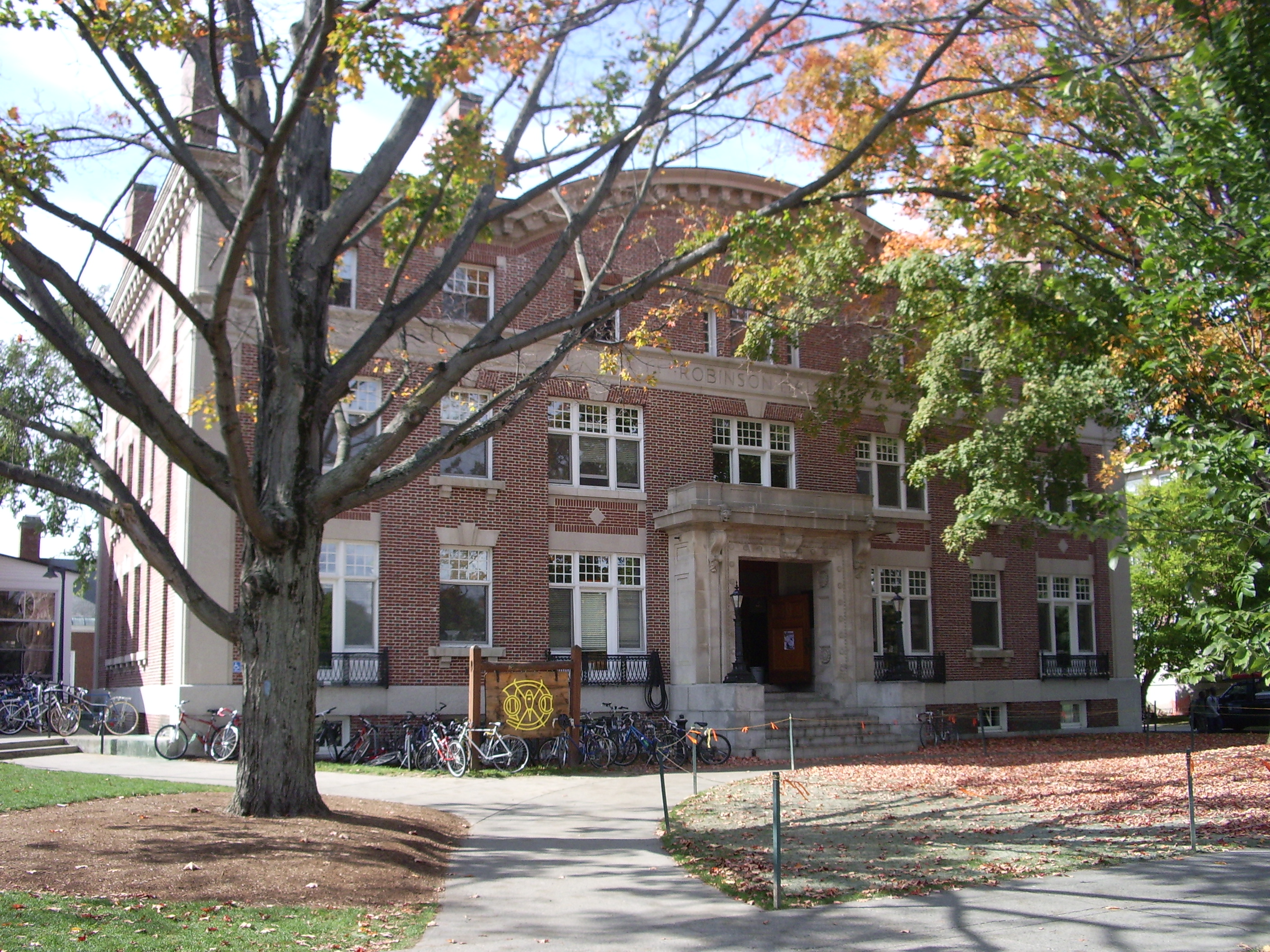
Robinson Hall houses many of the college's student-run organizations, including the Dartmouth Outing Club. The building is a designated stop along the Appalachian Trail.

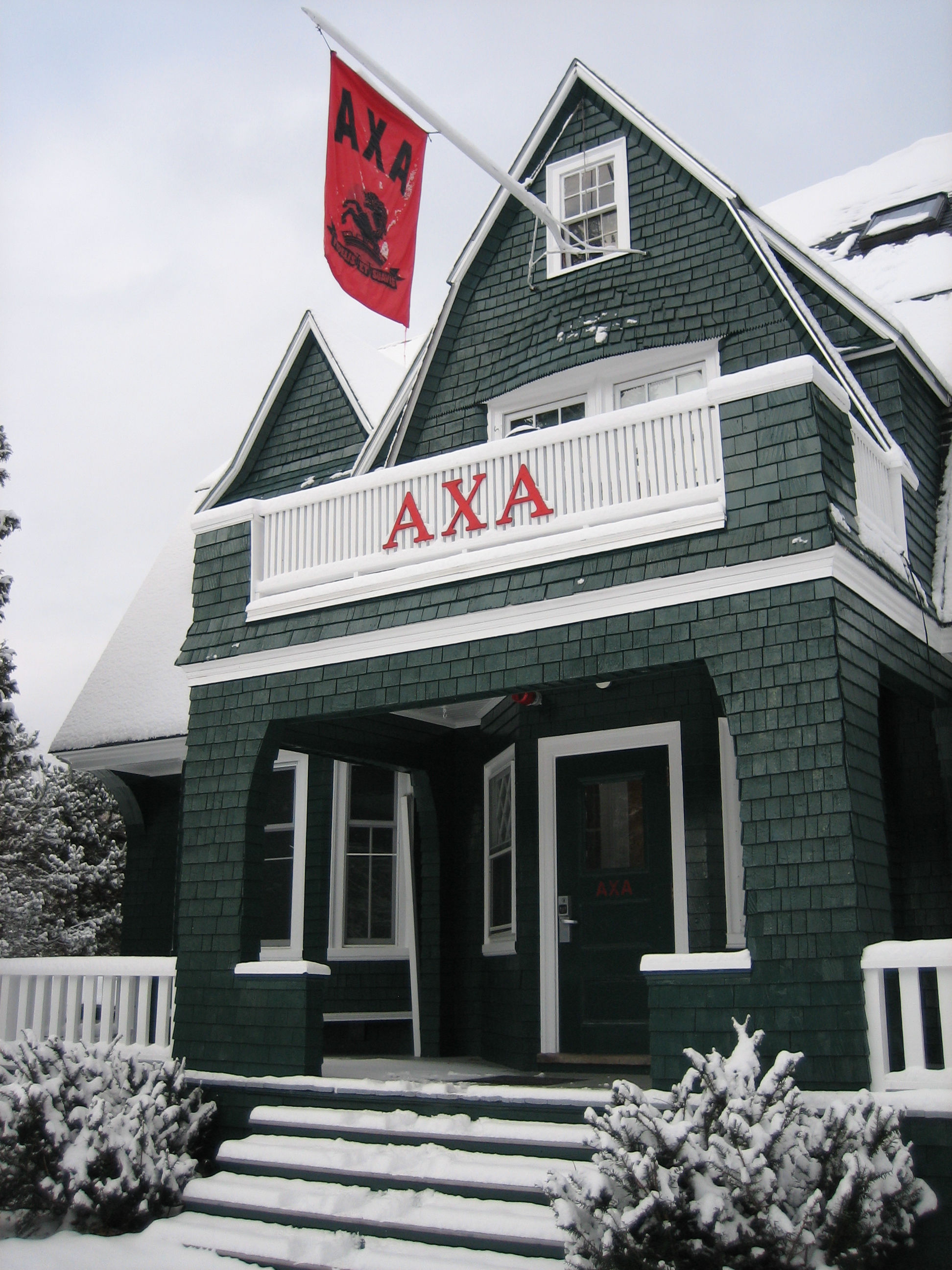
Dartmouth Alpha Chi Alpha fraternity house.

Dartmouth's more than 200 student organizations and clubs cover a wide range of interests. In 2007, the college hosted eight academic groups, 17 cultural groups, two honor societies, 30 "issue-oriented" groups, 25 performing groups, 12 pre-professional groups, 20 publications, and 11 recreational groups. Notable student groups include the nation's largest and oldest collegiate outdoors club, the Dartmouth Outing Club, which includes the nationally recognized Big Green Bus; the campus's oldest a cappella group, The Dartmouth Aires; the controversial independent newspaper The Dartmouth Review; Dartmouth Student Government, the college's official undergraduate student government; and The Dartmouth, arguably the nation's oldest university newspaper. The Dartmouth describes itself as "America's Oldest College Newspaper, Founded 1799".

Partially because of Dartmouth's rural, isolated location, the Greek system dating from the 1840s is one of the most popular social outlets for students. Dartmouth is home to 32 recognized Greek houses: 17 fraternities, 12 sororities, and three coeducational organizations. In 2007, roughly 70% of eligible students belonged to a Greek organization; since 1987, students have not been permitted to join Greek organizations until their sophomore year. Dartmouth College was among the first institutions of higher education to desegregate fraternity houses, doing so in the 1950s, and was involved in the movement to create coeducational Greek houses in the 1970s. In the early first decade of the 21st century, campus-wide debate focused on a board of trustees recommendation that Greek organizations become "substantially coeducational"; this attempt to change the Greek system eventually failed.

Dartmouth also has a number of secret societies, which are student- and alumni-led organizations often focused on preserving the history of the college and initiating service projects. Most prominent among them is the Sphinx society, housed in a prominent Egyptian tomb-like building near the center of campus. The Sphinx has been the subject of numerous rumors as to its facilities, practices, and membership.

The college has an additional classification of social/residential organizations known as undergraduate societies.

=== Athletics ===
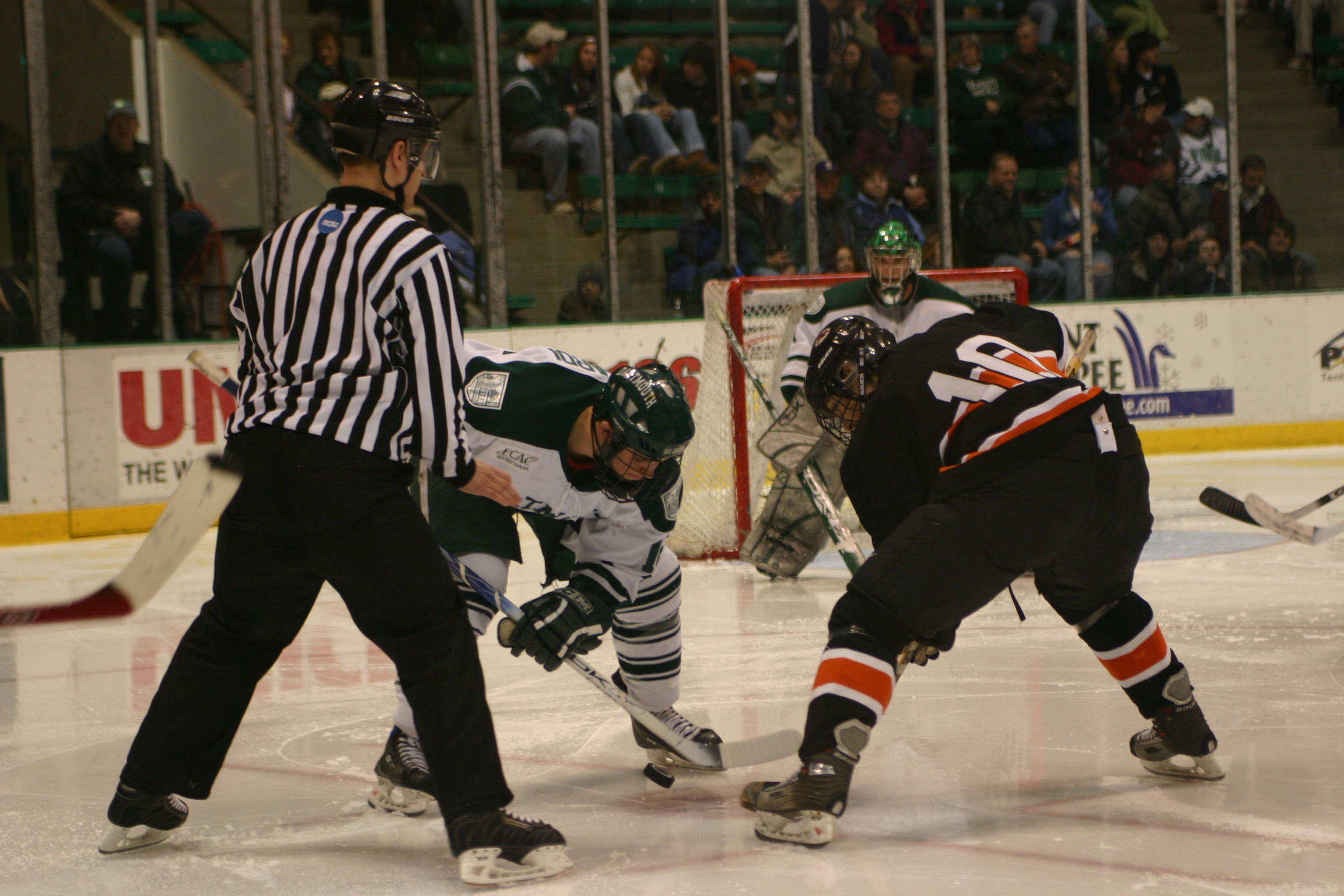
A Dartmouth varsity hockey game against Princeton at Thompson Arena

Approximately 20% of students participate in a varsity sport, and nearly 80% participate in some form of club, varsity, intramural, or other athletics. In 2021, Dartmouth College fielded 33 intercollegiate varsity teams: 15 for men, 17 for women, and coeducational sailing and equestrian programs. Dartmouth's athletic teams compete in the NCAA Division I eight-member Ivy League conference; some teams also participate in the Eastern College Athletic Conference (ECAC). As is mandatory for the members of the Ivy League, Dartmouth College does not offer athletic scholarships. In addition to the traditional American team sports (football, basketball, baseball, and ice hockey), Dartmouth competes at the varsity level in many other sports including track and field, softball, squash, sailing, tennis, rowing, soccer, skiing, and lacrosse.

The college also offers 26 club and intramural sports such as fencing, rugby, water polo, figure skating, boxing, volleyball, ultimate frisbee, and cricket, leading to a 75% participation rate in athletics among the undergraduate student body. The Dartmouth Fencing Team, despite being entirely self-coached, won the USACFC club national championship in 2014. The Dartmouth Men's Rugby Team, founded in 1951, has been ranked among the best collegiate teams in that sport, winning for example the Ivy Rugby Conference every year between 2008 and 2020. The figure skating team won the national championship five straight times from 2004 through 2008. In addition to the academic requirements for graduation, Dartmouth requires every undergraduate to complete a 50-yard (46 m) swim and three terms of physical education.

=== Native Americans at Dartmouth ===
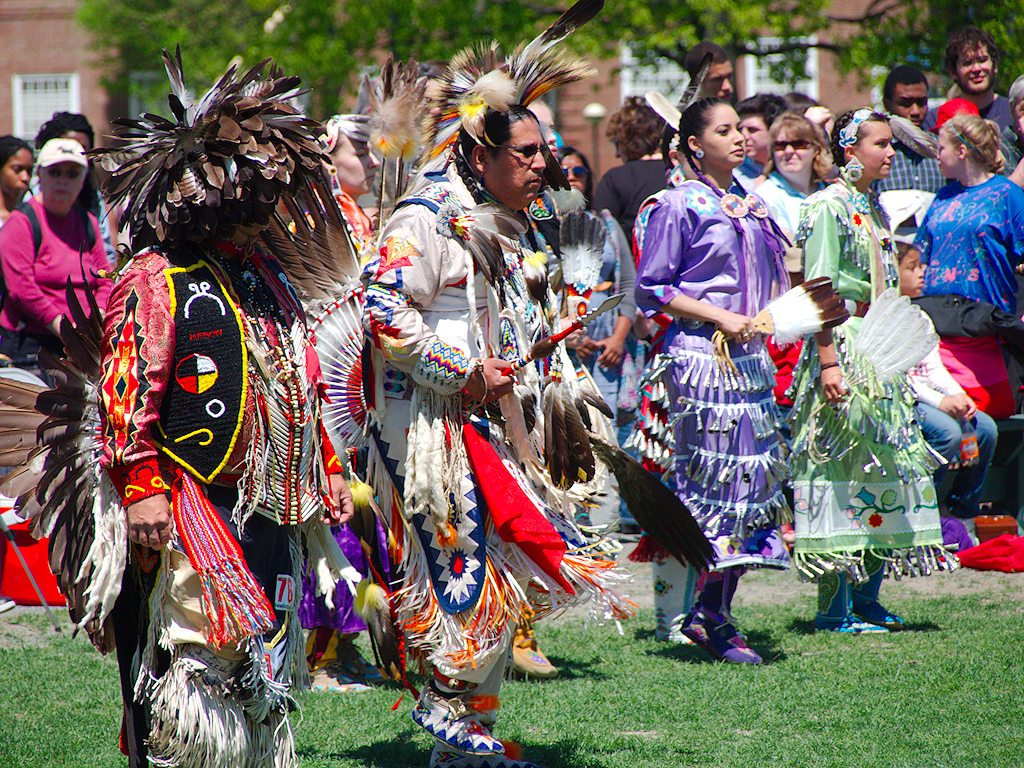
The 40th Dartmouth Powwow

The charter of Dartmouth College, granted to Wheelock in 1769, proclaims that the institution was created "for the education and instruction of Youth of the Indian Tribes in this Land in reading, writing and all parts of Learning ... as well as in all liberal Arts and Sciences; and also of English Youth and any others". However, Wheelock primarily intended the college to educate white youth, and the few Native students that attended Dartmouth experienced much difficulty in an institution ostensibly dedicated to their education. The funds for the Charity School for Native Americans that preceded Dartmouth College were raised primarily by the efforts of a Mohegan named Samson Occom, and at least some of those funds were used to help found the college.

The college graduated only 19 Native Americans during its first 200 years. In 1970, the college established Native American academic and social programs as part of a "new dedication to increasing Native American enrollment". Since then, Dartmouth has graduated over 700 Native American students from over 200 different tribes, more than the other seven Ivy League universities combined.

=== Traditions ===
Dartmouth is well known for its fierce school spirit and many traditions. The college functions on a quarter system, and one weekend each term is set aside as a traditional celebratory event, known on campus as "big weekends" or "party weekends". In the fall term, Homecoming (officially called Dartmouth Night) is marked by a bonfire on the Green constructed by the freshman class. Winter term is celebrated by Winter Carnival, a tradition started in 1911 by the Dartmouth Outing Club to promote winter sports. This tradition is the oldest in the United States, and subsequently went on to catch on at other New England colleges. In the spring, Green Key is a weekend mostly devoted to campus parties and celebration.

The summer term was formerly marked by Tubestock, an unofficial tradition in which the students used wooden rafts and inner tubes to float on the Connecticut River. Begun in 1986, Tubestock was ended in 2006 by town ordinance. The Class of 2008, during their summer term on campus in 2006, replaced the defunct Tubestock with Fieldstock. This new celebration includes a barbecue, live music, and the revival of the 1970s and 1980s tradition of racing homemade chariots around the Green. Unlike Tubestock, Fieldstock is funded and supported by the college.

Another longstanding tradition is four-day, student-run First-Year Trips for incoming freshmen, begun in 1935. Each trip concludes at the Moosilauke Ravine Lodge. In 2011, over 96% of freshmen elected to participate.

== Insignia and other representations ==
=== Motto and song ===
Dartmouth's motto, chosen by Eleazar Wheelock, is Vox clamantis in deserto. The Latin motto is literally translated as "The voice of one crying in the wilderness", but is more often rendered as "A voice crying out in the wilderness". The phrase appears five times in the Bible and is a reference to the college's location on what was once the frontier of European settlement. Richard Hovey's "Men of Dartmouth" was elected as the best of Dartmouth's songs in 1896, and became the school's official song in 1926. The song was retitled to "Alma Mater" in the 1980s when its lyrics were changed to refer to women as well as men.

=== Seal ===
Seal of Dartmouth College

Dartmouth's 1769 royal charter required the creation of a seal for use on official documents and diplomas. The college's founder, Eleazar Wheelock, designed a seal for his college bearing a striking resemblance to the seal of the Society for the Propagation of the Gospel, a missionary society founded in London in 1701, in order to maintain the illusion that his college was more for mission work than for higher education. Engraved by a Boston silversmith, the seal was ready by commencement of 1773. The trustees officially accepted the seal on August 25, 1773, describing it as:

An Oval, circumscribed by a Line containing SIGILL: COL: DARTMUTH: NOV: HANT: IN AMERICA 1770. within projecting a Pine Grove on the Right, whence proceed Natives towards an Edifice two Storey on the left; which bears in a Label over the Grove these Words "vox clamantis in deserto" the whole supported by Religion on the Right and Justice on the Left, and bearing in a Triangle irradiate, with the Hebrew Words [El Shaddai], agreeable to the above Impression, be the common Seal under which to pass all Diplomas or Certificates of Degrees, and all other Affairs of Business of and concerning Dartmouth College.

On October 28, 1926, the trustees affirmed the charter's reservation of the seal for official corporate documents alone. The College Publications Committee commissioned noted typographer William Addison Dwiggins to create a line drawing version of the seal in 1940 that saw widespread use. Dwiggins' design was modified during 1957 to change the date from "1770" to "1769", to accord with the date of the college charter. The trustees commissioned a new set of dies with a date of "1769" to replace the old dies, now badly worn after almost two hundred years of use. The 1957 design continues to be used.

=== Shield ===
On October 28, 1926, the trustees approved a "Dartmouth College Shield" for general use. Artist and engraver W. Parke Johnson designed this emblem on the basis of the shield that is depicted at the center of the original seal. This design does not survive. On June 9, 1944, the trustees approved another coat of arms based on the shield part of the seal, this one by Canadian artist and designer Thoreau MacDonald. That design was used widely and, like Dwiggins' seal, had its date changed from "1770" to "1769" around 1958. That version continues to be used under trademark registration number 3112676 and others.

College designer John Scotford made a stylized version of the shield during the 1960s, but it did not see the success of MacDonald's design. The shield appears to have been used as the basis of the shield of the Geisel School of Medicine, and it has been reproduced in sizes as small as 20 micrometers across. The design has appeared on Rudolph Ruzicka's Bicentennial Medal (Philadelphia Mint, 1969) and elsewhere.

=== Nickname, symbol, and mascot ===
Dartmouth has never had an official mascot. The nickname "The Big Green", originating in the 1860s, is based on students' adoption of a shade of forest green ("Dartmouth Green") as the school's official color in 1866. Beginning in the 1920s, the Dartmouth College athletic teams were known by their unofficial nickname "the Indians", a moniker that probably originated among sports journalists. This unofficial mascot and team name was used until the early 1970s, when its use came under criticism. In 1974, the Trustees declared the "use of the [Indian] symbol in any form to be inconsistent with present institutional and academic objectives of the College in advancing Native American education". Some alumni and students, as well as the conservative student newspaper, The Dartmouth Review, have sought to return the Indian symbol to prominence, but never succeeded in doing so.

Various student initiatives have been undertaken to adopt a mascot, but none has become "official". One proposal devised by the college humor magazine the Dartmouth Jack-O-Lantern was Keggy the Keg, an anthropomorphic beer keg who makes occasional appearances at college sporting events. Despite student enthusiasm for Keggy, the mascot has received approval from only the student government. In November 2006, student government attempted to revive the "Dartmoose" amid renewed controversy surrounding the former unofficial Indian mascot.

== Alumni ==
Notable Dartmouth alumni include:

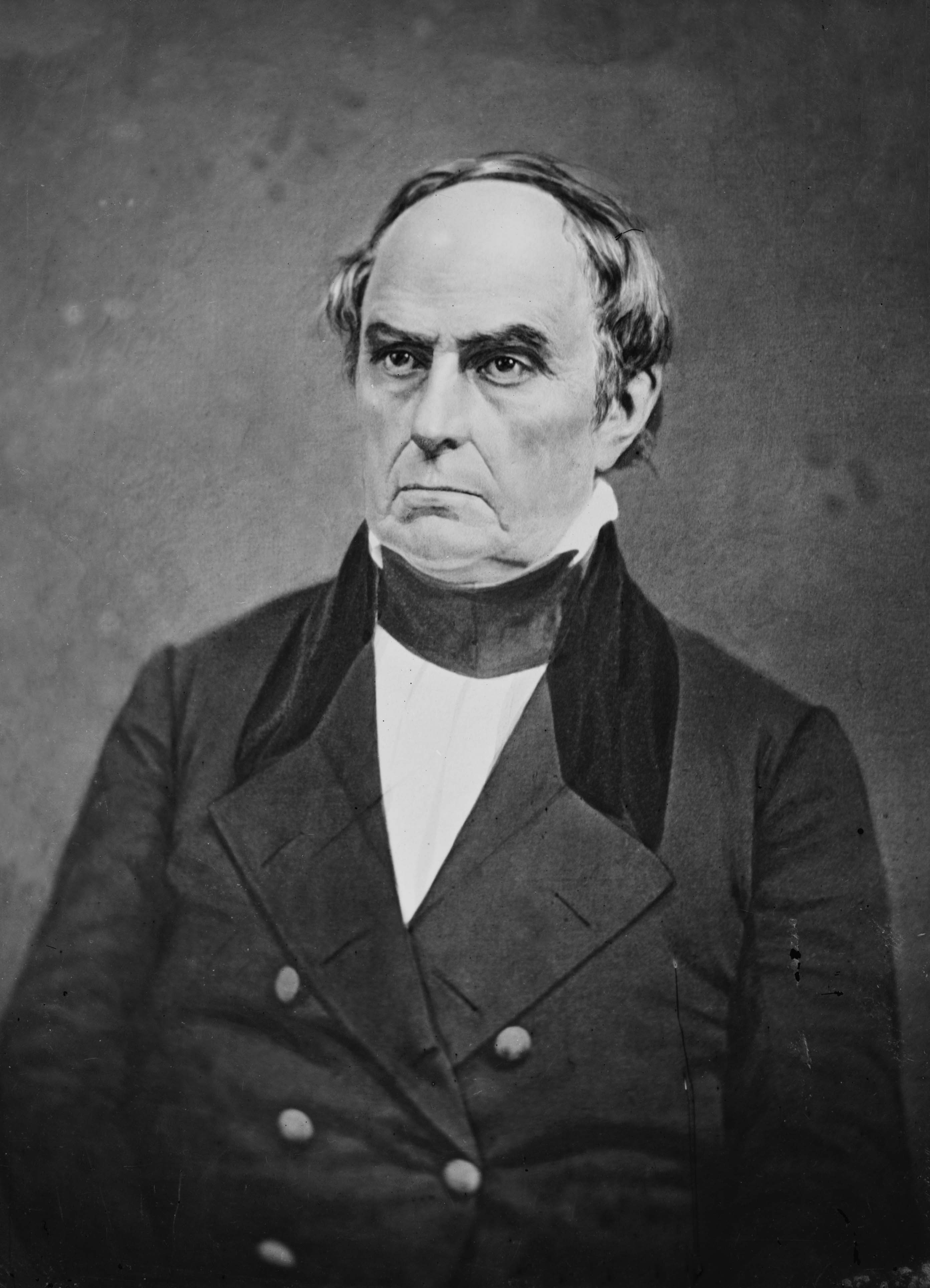
Daniel Webster: former Secretary of State (AB, 1801)

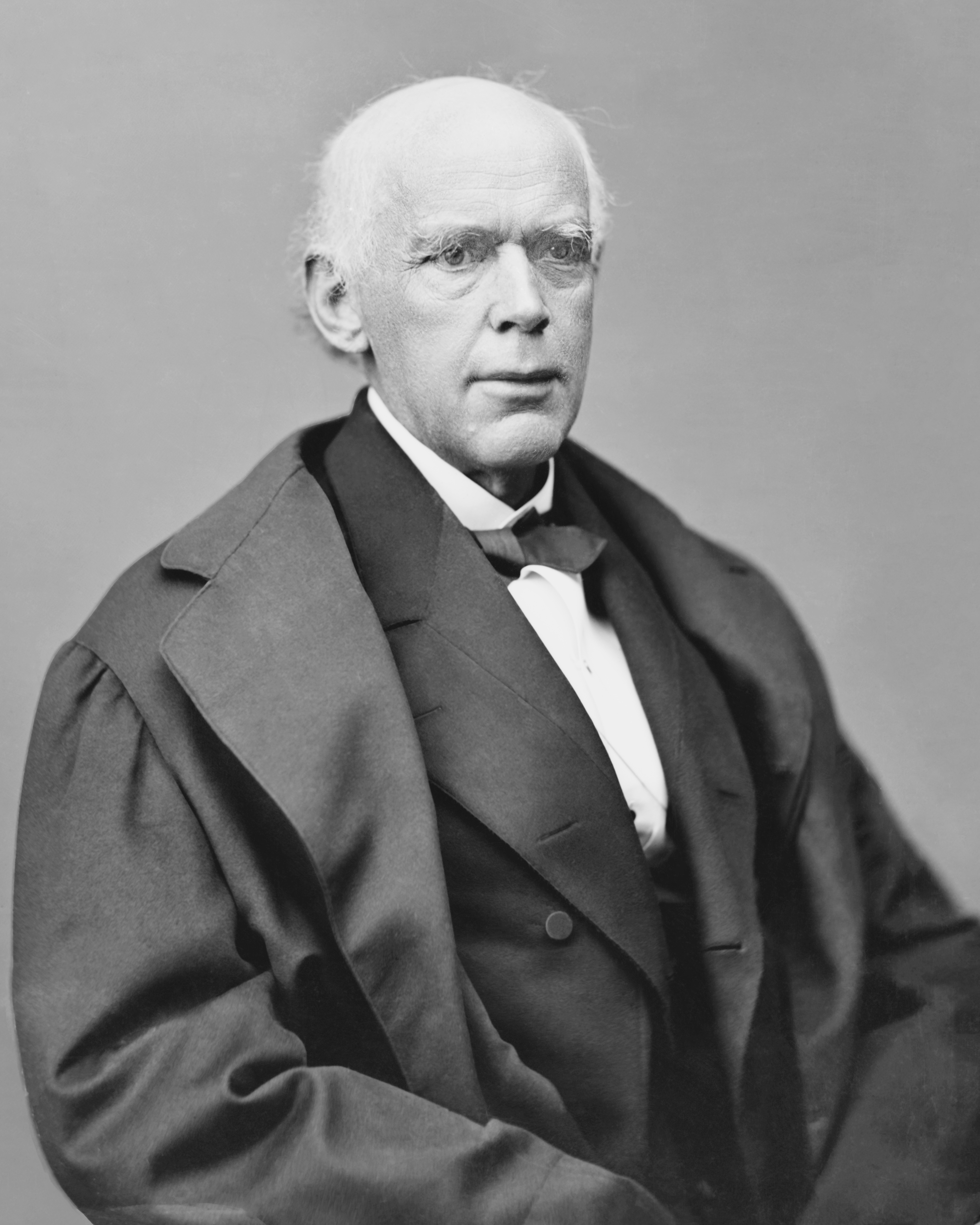
Salmon Chase: former Chief Justice of the U.S. (AB, 1826)

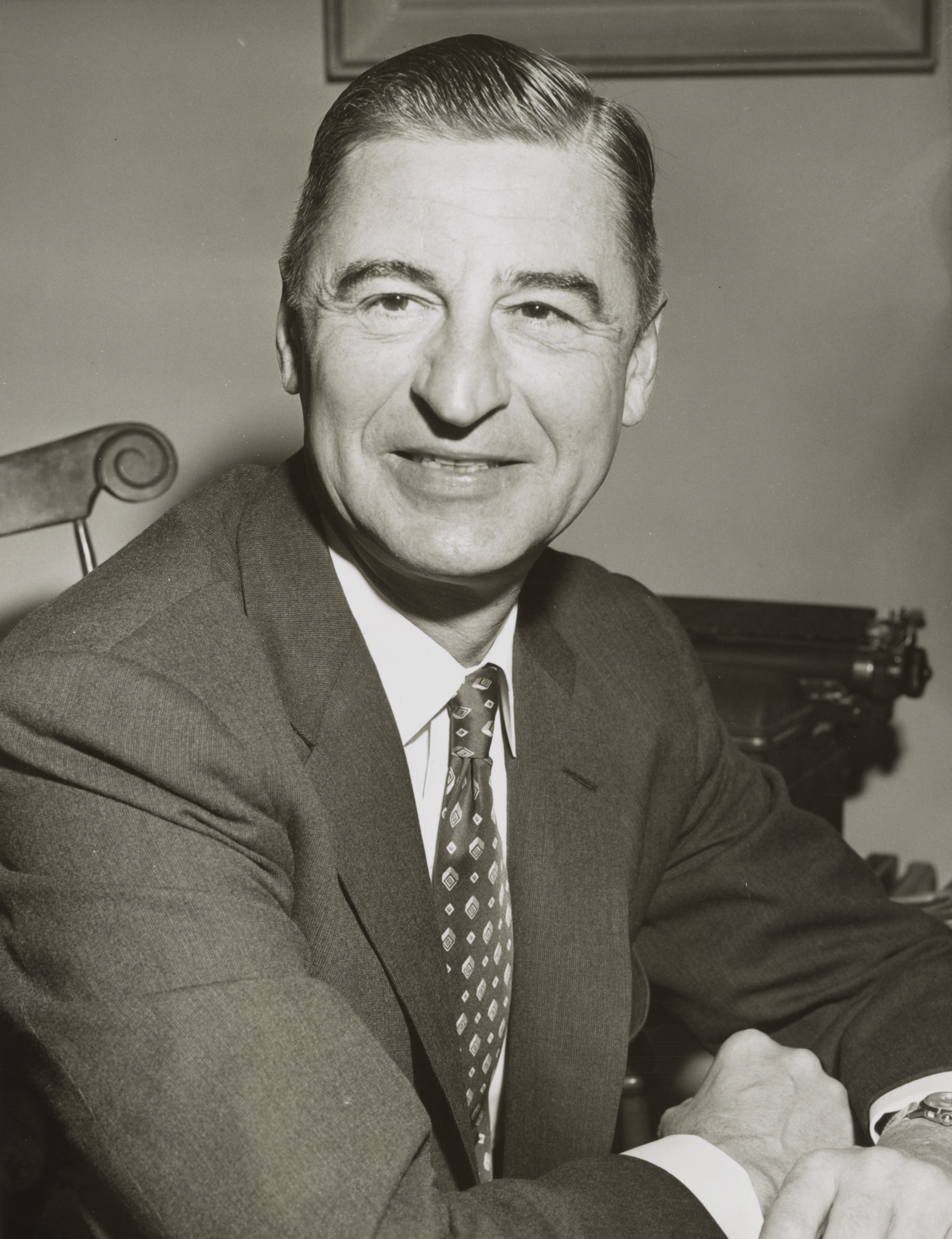
Dr. Seuss: writer and illustrator (AB, 1925)

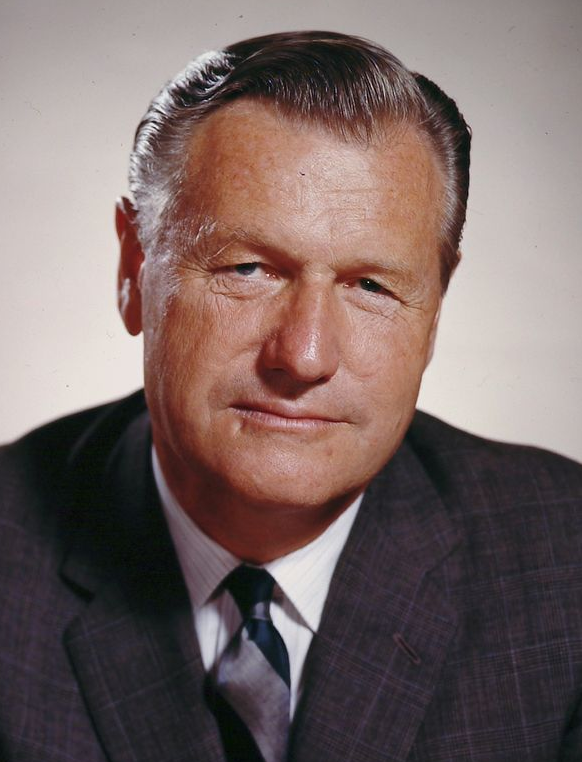
Nelson Rockefeller: former Vice President of the United States (AB, 1930)

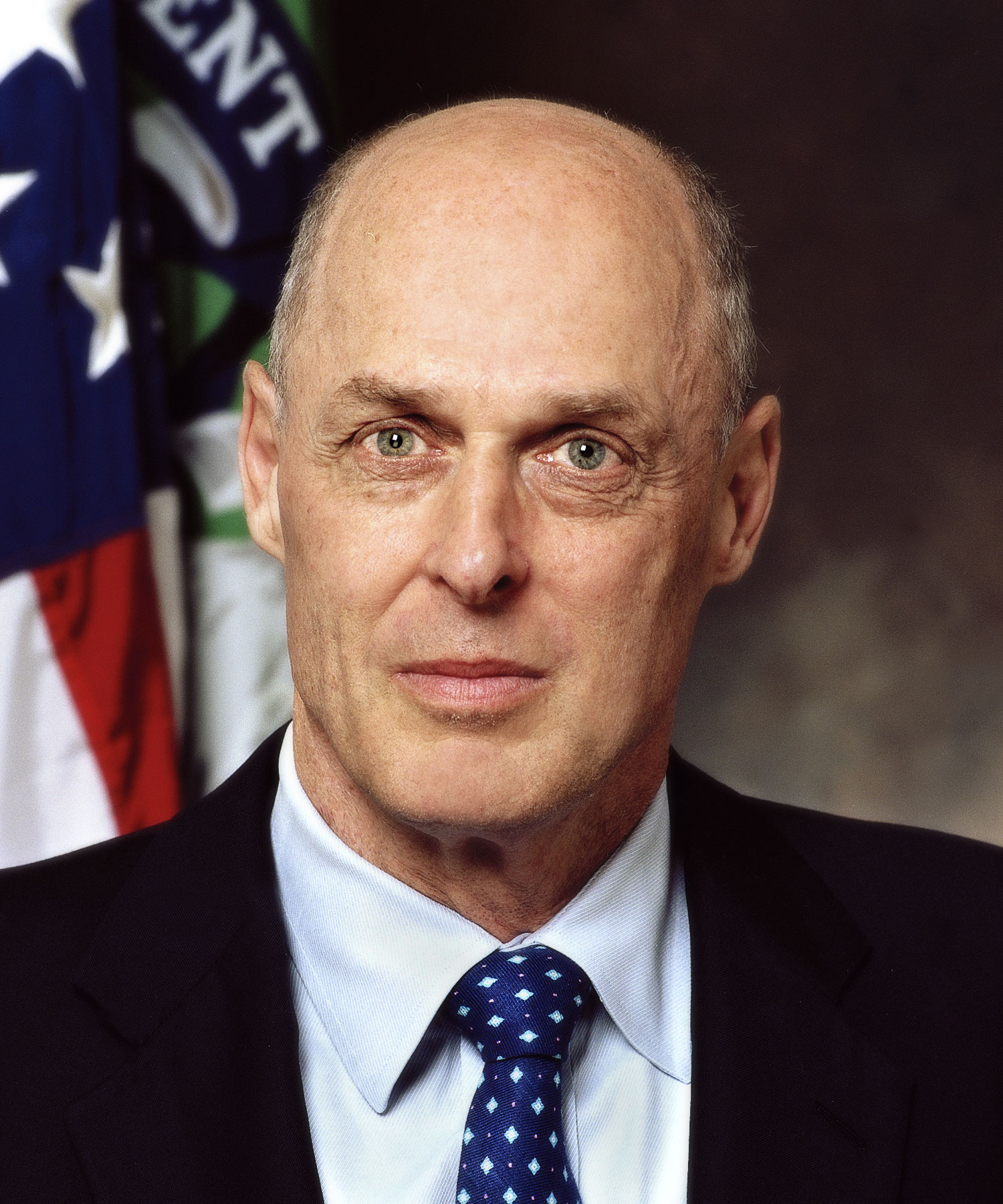
Henry Paulson: former CEO of Goldman Sachs and United States Secretary of the Treasury (AB, 1968)

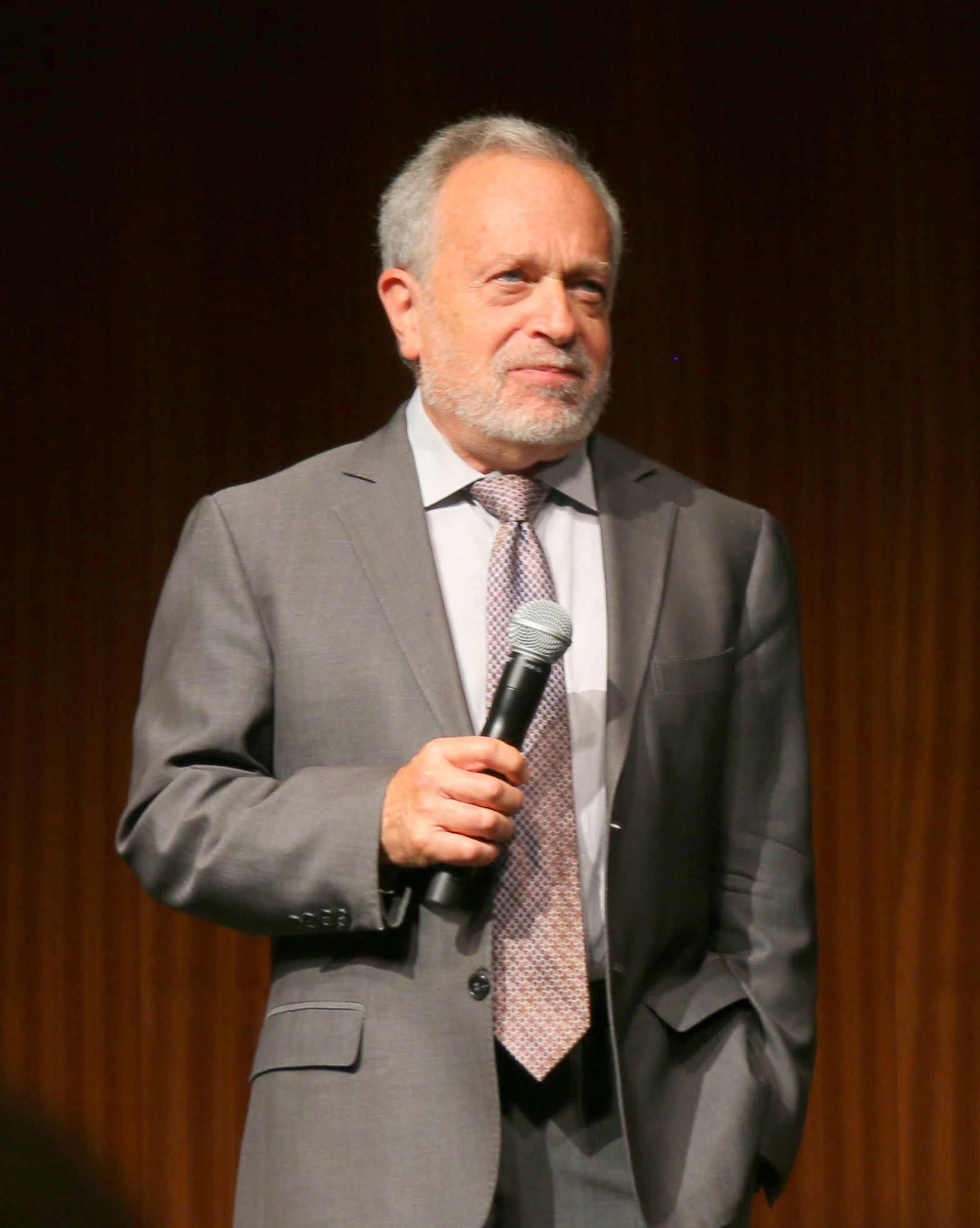
Robert Reich: former United States Secretary of Labor, political commentator, professor, and author (AB, 1968)

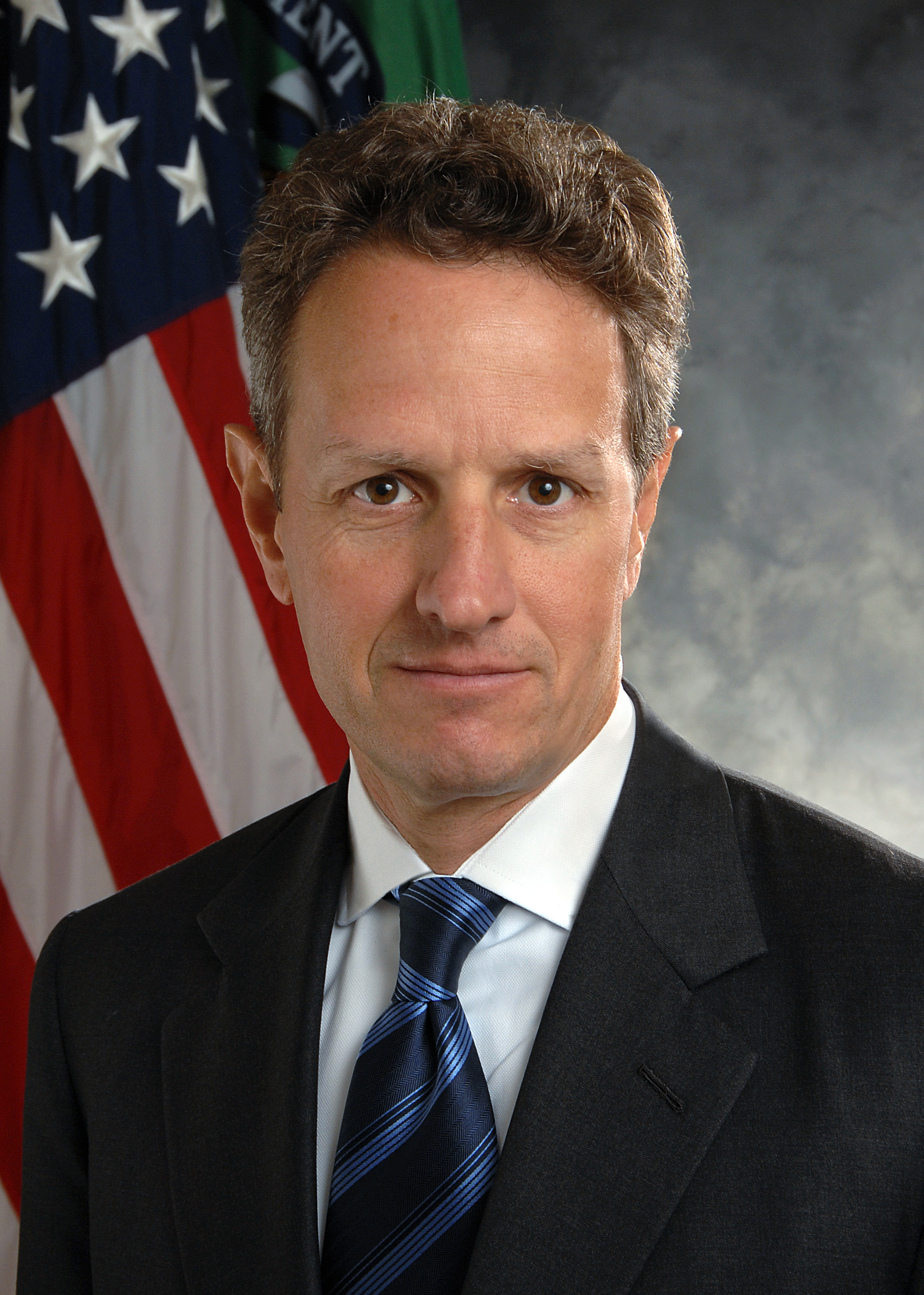
Timothy Geithner, former United States Secretary of the Treasury (AB, 1983)

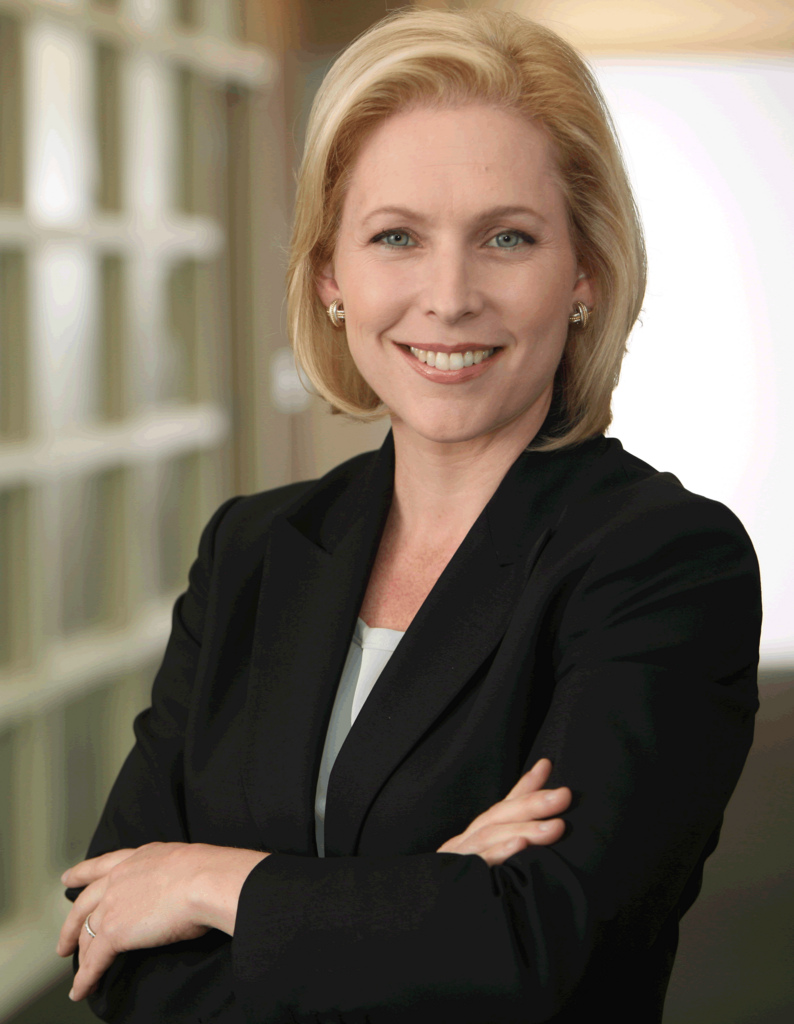
Kirsten Gillibrand: United States senator (AB, 1988)

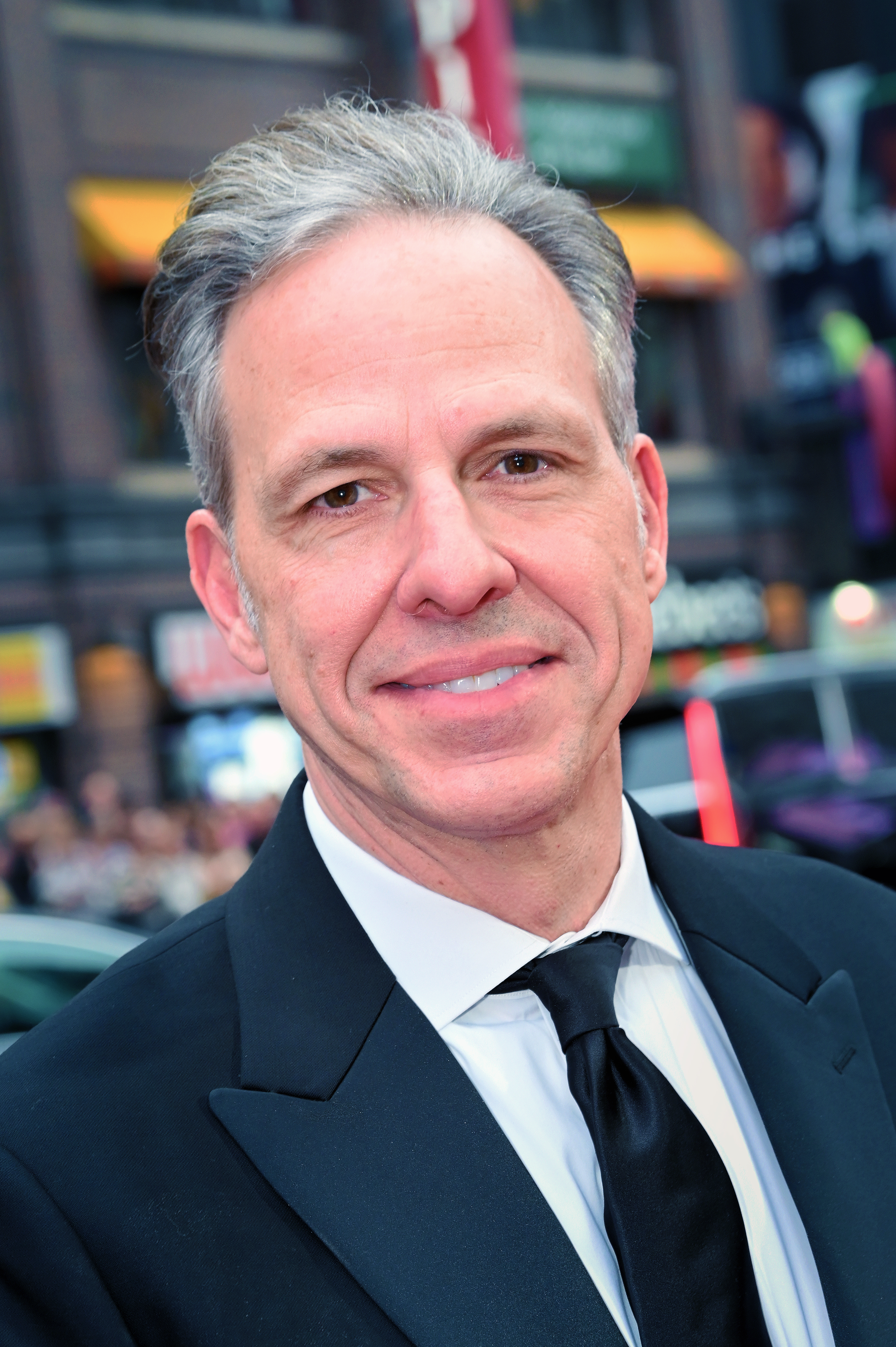
Jake Tapper: journalist, author, and commentator (BA, 1991)

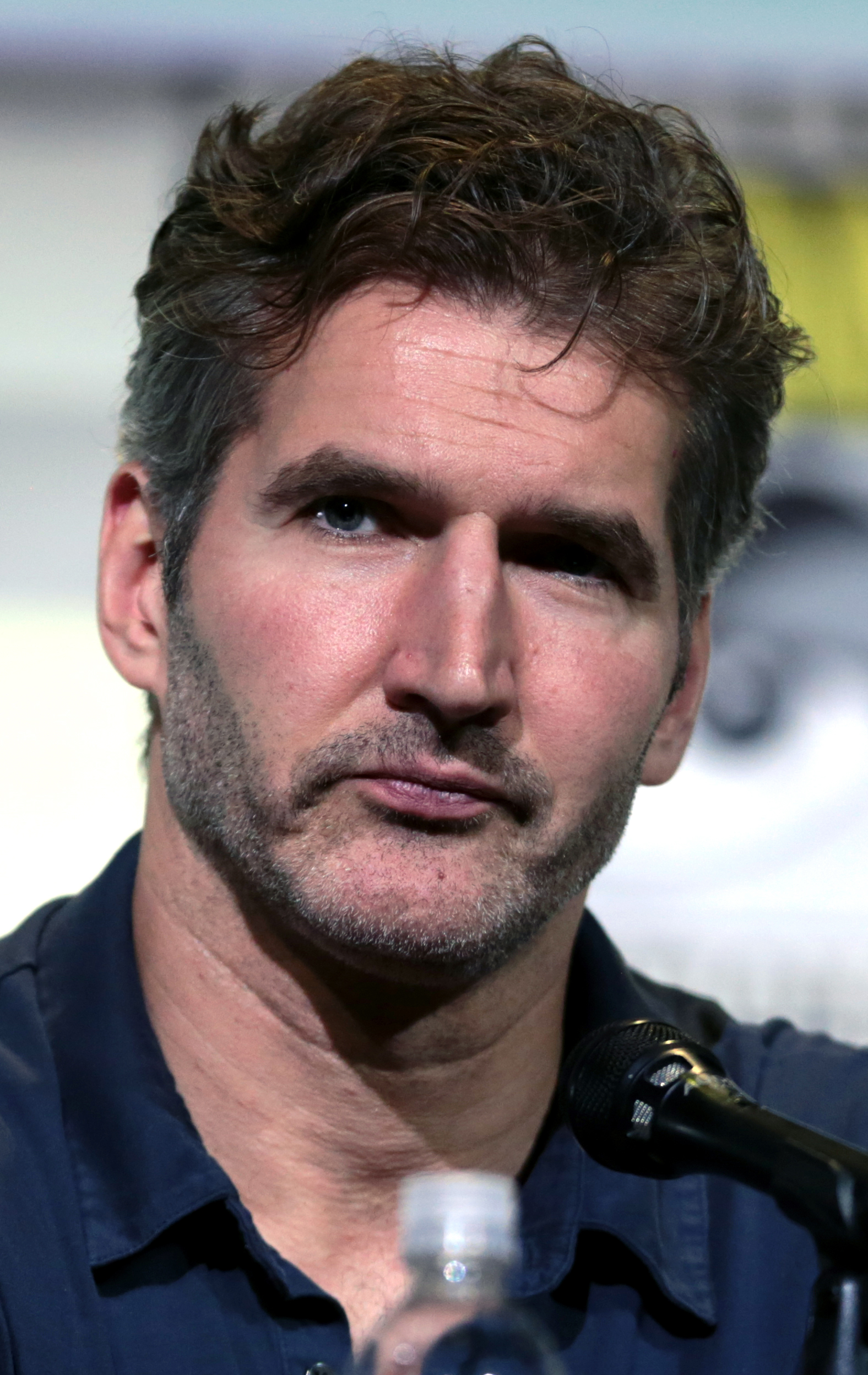
David Benioff: screenwriter and television producer, writer, and director (AB, 1992)

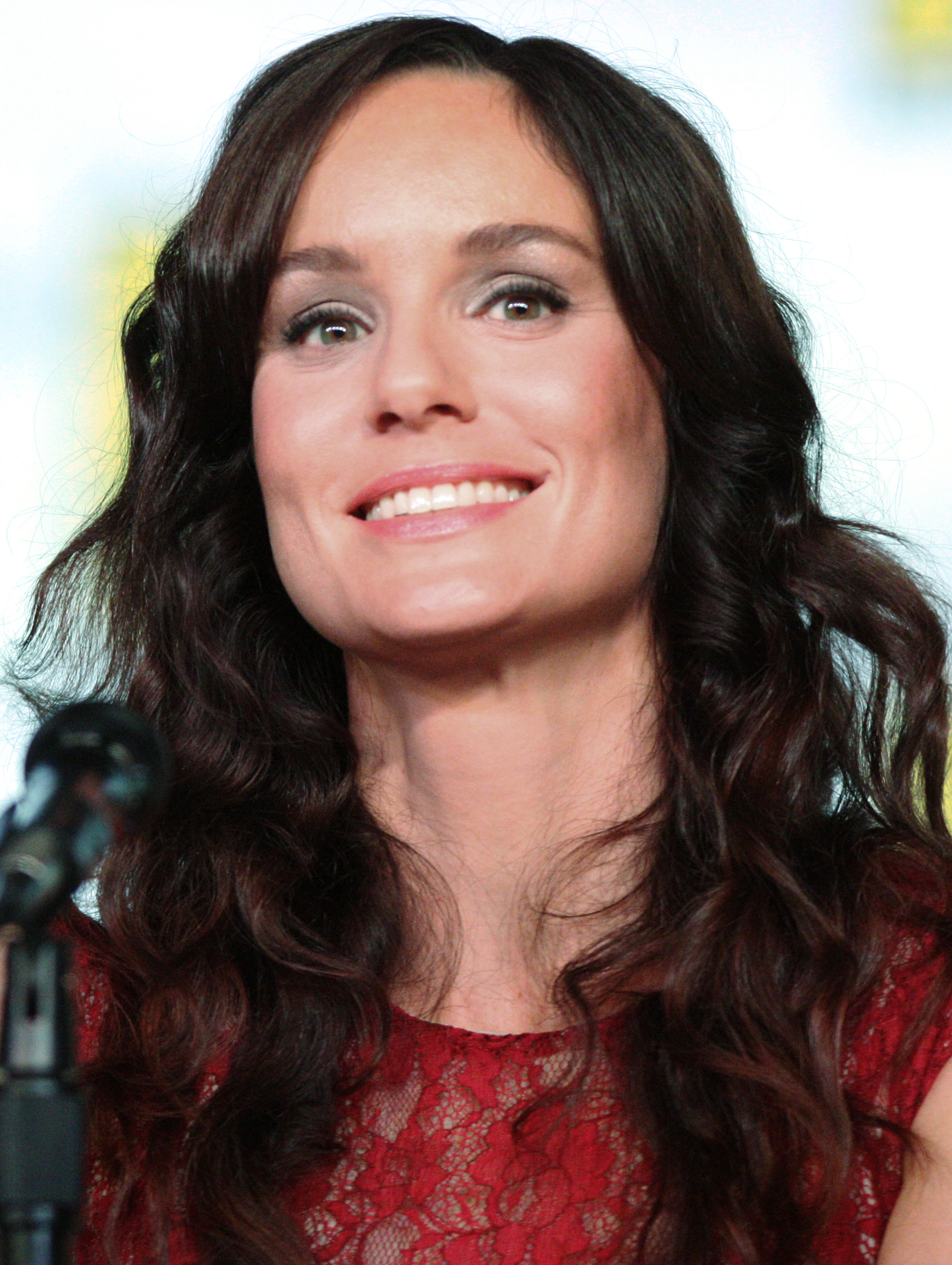
Sarah Wayne Callies: actress (AB, 1999)

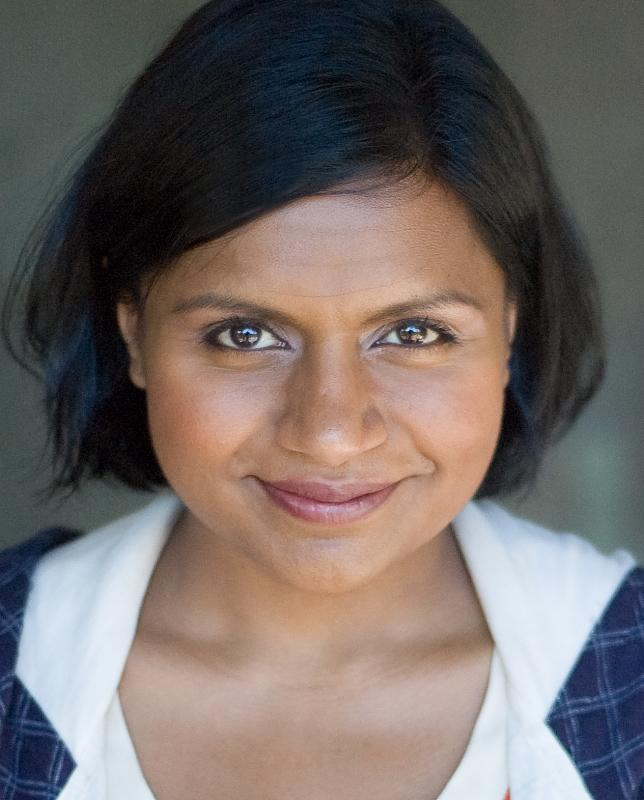
Mindy Kaling: actress and comedian (AB, 2001)

By 2008, Dartmouth had graduated 238 classes of students, and had over 60,000 living alumni in a variety of fields. Finance, consulting, and technology have consistently been the most popular industries to enter for students. Top employers of new graduates include Goldman Sachs, Morgan Stanley, McKinsey & Company, Bain & Company, Amazon, Microsoft, and Google.

=== Politics and business ===
Nelson A. Rockefeller, 41st Vice President of the United States and 49th Governor of New York, graduated cum laude from Dartmouth with a degree in economics in 1930. Over 164 Dartmouth graduates have served in the United States Senate and United States House of Representatives, such as Massachusetts statesman Daniel Webster. Cabinet members of American presidents include Attorney General Amos T. Akerman, Secretary of Defense James V. Forrestal, Secretary of Labor Robert Reich, Secretary of the Treasury Henry Paulson, and Secretary of the Treasury Timothy Geithner. C. Everett Koop was the Surgeon General of the United States under President Ronald Reagan. Two Dartmouth alumni have served as justices on the Supreme Court of the United States: Salmon P. Chase and Levi Woodbury. Eugene Norman Veasey (class of 1954) served as the Chief Justice of Delaware. The 46th governor of Pennsylvania, Tom Wolf; the 42nd governor of Illinois, businessman Bruce Rauner; and the 31st governor and current senator from North Dakota, John Hoeven (R), are also Dartmouth alumni. Ernesto de la Guardia, class of 1925, was president of the Republic of Panama.

Dartmouth alumni serving as CEOs or company presidents and executives include John Henry Patterson (NCR owner) and founder, Charles Alfred Pillsbury, founder of the Pillsbury Company and patriarch of the Pillsbury family, Sandy Alderson (San Diego Padres), Jeffrey R. Immelt (General Electric), Gail Koziara Boudreaux (UnitedHealthcare), Grant Tinker (NBC), and Brian Goldner (Hasbro).

=== Media ===
In film, entertainment, and television, Dartmouth is represented by David Benioff, co-creator, showrunner, and writer of Game of Thrones; Shonda Rhimes, creator of Grey's Anatomy, Private Practice, and Scandal; Budd Schulberg, Academy Award–winning screenwriter of On the Waterfront; Michael Phillips, who won the Academy Award for Best Picture as co-producer of The Sting; Rachel Dratch, a former cast member of Saturday Night Live; Chris Meledandri, executive producer of Ice Age, Horton Hears a Who!, and Despicable Me; writer and director duo Phil Lord and Chris Miller; and the title character of Mister Rogers' Neighborhood, Fred Rogers. Other notable film and television figures include Sarah Wayne Callies (Prison Break), Emmy Award winner Michael Moriarty, Andrew Shue of Melrose Place, Aisha Tyler of Friends and 24, ESPN broadcaster Brett Haber, Connie Britton of Spin City and Friday Night Lights, Mindy Kaling of The Office and The Mindy Project, David Harbour of Stranger Things, and Michelle Khare of Karma.

In literature and journalism, Dartmouth has produced 13 Pulitzer Prize winners: Thomas M. Burton, Richard Eberhart, Justin Harvey Smith and Robert Frost. Other authors and media personalities include CNN Chief White House correspondent and anchor Jake Tapper, novelist and founding editor of The Believer Heidi Julavits, "Dean of rock critics" Robert Christgau, National Book Award winners Louise Erdrich and Phil Klay, novelist/screenwriter Budd Schulberg, political commentator Dinesh D'Souza, radio talk show host Laura Ingraham, commentator Mort Kondracke, and journalist James Panero. Norman Maclean, professor at the University of Chicago and author of A River Runs Through It and Other Stories, graduated from Dartmouth in 1924. Theodor Geisel, better known as children's author Dr. Seuss, was a member of the class of 1925. Tom Ryan, CEO and president of Paramount Streaming and Founder of Pluto TV graduated in 1991.

=== Religion and academia ===
In the area of religion and theology, Dartmouth alumni include priests and ministers Ebenezer Porter, Jonathan Clarkson Gibbs, Caleb Sprague Henry, Arthur Whipple Jenks, Solomon Spalding, and Joseph Tracy; Transcendental Meditation Movement leader John Hagelin; and rabbis Marshall Meyer, Arnold Resnicoff, and David E. Stern. Hyrum Smith, brother of Mormon Prophet Joseph Smith, attended the college in his teens. He was Patriarch of the LDS Church.

Dartmouth alumni in academia include Stuart Kauffman and Jeffrey Weeks, both recipients of MacArthur Fellowships (commonly called "genius grants"). Dartmouth has also graduated three Nobel Prize winners with four separate prizes: Owen Chamberlain (Physics, 1959), K. Barry Sharpless (Chemistry, 2001 and 2022), and George Davis Snell (Physiology or Medicine, 1980). Educators include founder and first president of Bates College Oren Burbank Cheney (1839); the former chancellor of the University of California, San Diego, Marye Anne Fox (PhD. in chemistry, 1974); founding president of Vassar College Milo Parker Jewett; founder and first president of Kenyon College Philander Chase; first professor of Wabash College Caleb Mills; president of Union College Charles Augustus Aiken. Nine of Dartmouth's seventeen presidents were alumni of the college.

=== Sports ===
A number of Dartmouth alumni have found success in professional sports. In baseball, Dartmouth alumni include All-Star and three-time Gold Glove winner and manager Brad Ausmus, All-Star reliever Mike Remlinger, pitcher Kyle Hendricks and first baseman Ben Rice. Professional football players include Miami Dolphins quarterback Jay Fiedler, linebacker Reggie Williams, three-time Pro Bowler Nick Lowery, quarterback Jeff Kemp, and Tennessee Titans tight end Casey Cramer, and Miami Dolphins defensive coordinator Matt Burke.

Dartmouth has also produced a number of Olympic competitors. Lawrence Whitney won bronze at the 1912 Summer Olympics in men's shot put. Adam Nelson won the silver medal in the shot put in the 2000 Sydney Olympics and the gold medal at the 2004 Athens Olympics to go along with his gold medal in the 2005 World Championships in Athletics in Helsinki. Kristin King and Sarah Parsons were members of the United States' 2006 bronze medal-winning ice hockey team. Cherie Piper, Gillian Apps, and Katie Weatherston were among Canada's ice hockey gold medalists in 2006. At the 2024 Olympics, Ariana Ramsey won a bronze medal with the United States women's national rugby sevens team. Dick Durrance and Tim Caldwell competed for the United States in skiing in the 1936 and 1976 Winter Olympics, respectively. Arthur Shaw, Earl Thomson, Edwin Myers, Marc Wright, Adam Nelson, Gerry Ashworth, and Vilhjálmur Einarsson have all won medals in track and field events. Former heavyweight rower Dominic Seiterle is a member of the Canadian national rowing team and won a gold medal at the 2008 Summer Olympics in the men's 8+ event.

== In popular culture ==
Dartmouth College has appeared in or been referenced by a number of popular media. Some of the most prominent include:

- Michael Corleone, the protagonist of Mario Puzo's 1969 novel The Godfather, attends Dartmouth.
- The 1978 comedy film National Lampoon's Animal House, was co-written by Chris Miller '63 and based, according to a CNN interview with John Landis, "on Chris Miller's real fraternity at Dartmouth", Alpha Delta Phi.
- Dartmouth's Winter Carnival tradition was the subject of the 1939 film Winter Carnival starring Ann Sheridan and written by Budd Schulberg '36 and F. Scott Fitzgerald.
- In Seth Rogen's 2007 comedy film Superbad, Dartmouth College is a recurring element of the plot, as two of the main characters have been accepted to the college while a third has been rejected.
- The 2021 HBO comedy-drama series The Sex Lives of College Girls, created by Mindy Kaling, was loosely based on Kaling's experiences as a student at Dartmouth College.

== See also ==
- Dartmouth–Harvard football rivalry
