= Campus of Dartmouth College =

College campus in New Hampshire, U.S.

Dartmouth College

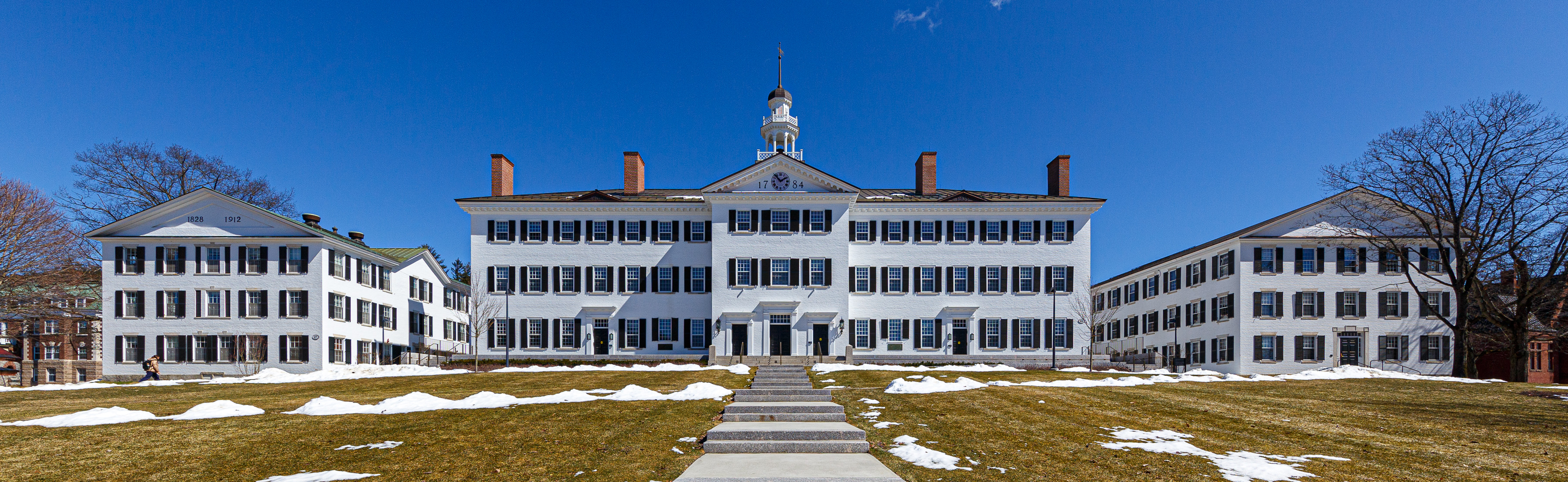
Wentworth Hall, Dartmouth Hall, and Thornton Hall

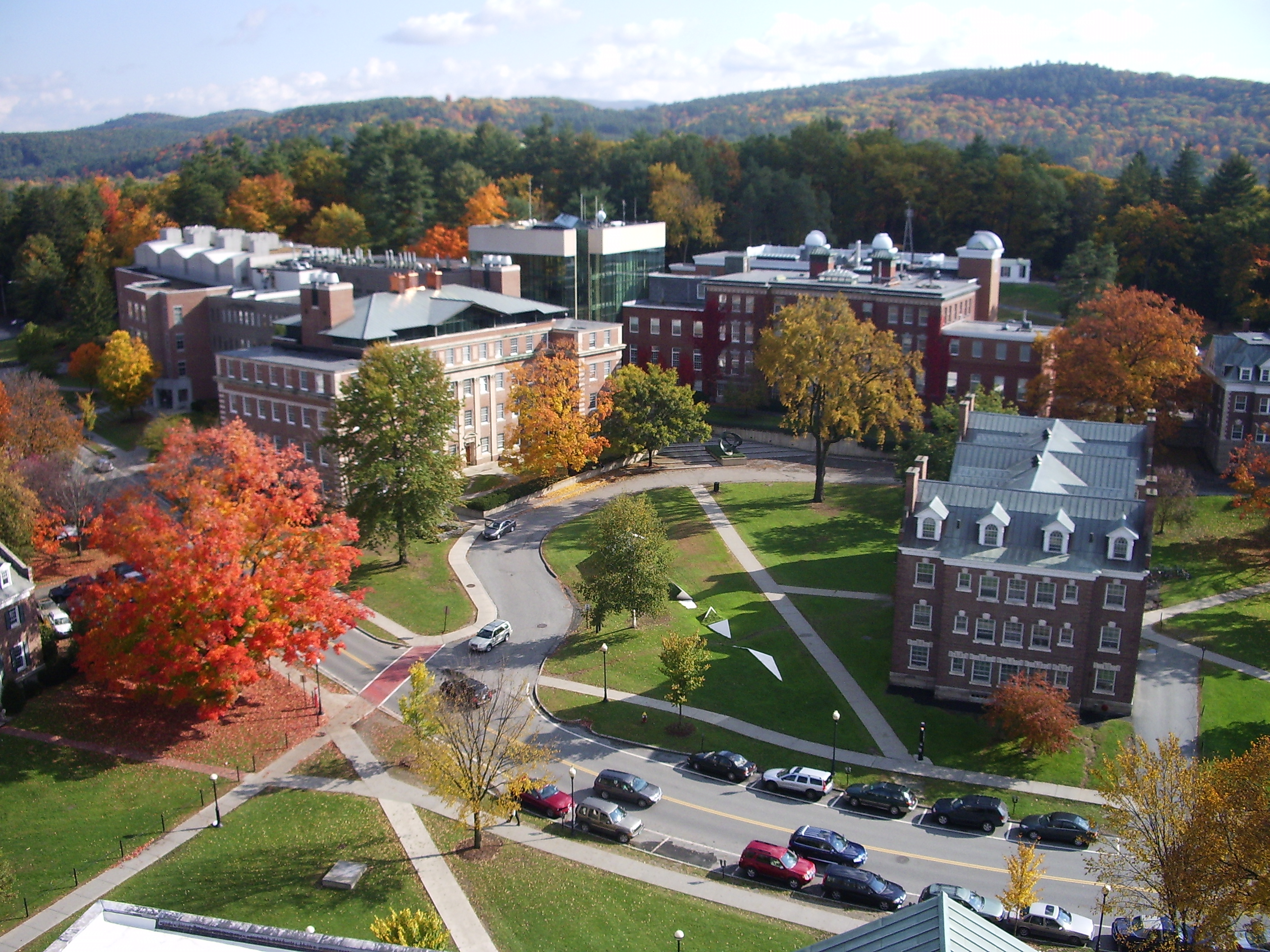
Northeast corner of campus viewed from the tower of Baker Memorial Library. From left to right: the Fairchild Physical Sciences Center (consisting of Burke, Steele, Fairchild and Wilder Halls) and Wheeler Hall.

Dartmouth College is located in the rural town of Hanover in the Upper Valley of the Connecticut River in the New England state of New Hampshire. Dartmouth's 269-acre (1.09 km^{2}) campus centered on the Green makes the institution the largest private landowner in the town of Hanover, and its landholdings and facilities are valued at an estimated $419 million. Dartmouth's campus buildings vary in age from several early 19th century buildings to a number of ongoing construction projects. Most of Dartmouth's buildings are designed in the Georgian style, a theme which has been preserved in recent architectural additions.

== Undergraduate college facilities ==
=== Academic and administrative buildings ===
Building	Image	Constructed	Notes	Reference
44 North College Street		1855 or earlier	44 North College Street was privately owned until at least 1954. Under the college's stewardship, it has served as a Russian language immersion house and an international students' house. Currently, it houses Off-Campus Programs.	
Baker Memorial Library		1928	Baker Library was built to replace the Wilson Hall library with money donated by George Fisher Baker in memory of his uncle, Fisher Ames Baker. The Reserve Corridor in the basement is decorated by a fresco by José Clemente Orozco called The Epic of American Civilization. Baker's iconic 200-foot (61 m) tower is often used as a symbolic representation of the college.	
Bartlett Hall		1890–1891	Bartlett Hall was originally constructed as the college's YMCA headquarters. Today it houses the Department of Asian and Middle Eastern Languages and Literatures and the Program in Asian and Middle Eastern Studies.	
Berry Library		1998–2000	Berry Library is an 80,000-square-foot (7,400 m^{2}) addition to Baker Memorial Library, named for George Berry. It stands on the site of the 1931 Dragon Hall, among other buildings.	
Burke Laboratory		1993–1994	Part of the Sherman Fairchild Physical Sciences Center, the Burke Laboratory is adjoined to the Fairchild Building and currently houses the Chemistry Department offices and laboratories.	
Carpenter Hall		1929	Carpenter currently houses the Art History Department, its Sherman Art Library, and the Program in Women's and Gender Studies.	
Carson Hall		2002	Carson Hall, connected to Berry Library, houses the History Department.	
Clement Hall		1914	Originally built as an auto garage, Clement housed art studios and workspace and the entire Animation section of the Film and Media Studies Department until it was demolished in February 2010.	
Dartmouth Hall		1904–1906	The original Dartmouth Hall, constructed in 1784, was the oldest College building until it burned in 1904. It was reconstructed the following year, and its replacement houses the Department of French and Italian Languages and Literatures, Department of German Studies, and Department of Spanish and Portuguese Languages and Literatures.	
Charles Gilman Life Sciences Laboratory		1964	Gilman housed the Biological Sciences Department until the completion of the Class of 1978 Life Sciences Center and was connected to the Dartmouth Medical School until it was demolished in 2018.	
Haldeman Center		2004–2006	The Haldeman Center houses the Institute for the Study of Applied and Professional Ethics, the Fannie and Alan Leslie Center for the Humanities at Dartmouth College, and the John Sloan Dickey Center for International Understanding.	
Hopkins Center for the Arts		1962	Designed by famed architect Wallace Harrison, the Hopkins Center ("the Hop") houses Dartmouth's Music, Studio Art, and Theater departments. It also contains several auditoriums, a dining facility, and the Paddock Music Library.	
Arthur L. Irving Institute for Energy and Society		2022	The mission of the Institute is “to advance an affordable, sustainable, and reliable energy future for the benefit of society.” Designed by Goody, Clancy & Associates.	
Kemeny Hall		2004–2006	Kemeny Hall is the home of the Mathematics Department, which had previously been scattered among multiple buildings for more than 25 years.	
McNutt Hall		1902–1904	Originally named Tuck Hall, McNutt housed the Tuck School of Business until 1930. Today, the building houses the Office of Undergraduate Admissions, the Office of the Registrar, and Student Financial Services.	
Moore Hall		1996–1998	Moore Hall houses the Psychological and Brain Sciences Department.	
Parkhurst Hall		1911	This building houses administrative offices, including the Office of the President, Office of the Provost, Office of the Dean of the College, and Office of Undergraduate Judicial Affairs.	
Raven House		1944 or later	Raven was built as a "convalescent home" for patients of the hospital that formerly stood nearby. In 1989, Dartmouth purchased the building and converted it to use for computing administration. It also houses the Department of Education.	
Reed Hall		1839–1840	Reed was originally constructed to house Dartmouth's library, which was previously located in the nearby Dartmouth Hall. In the late 19th century, it came to be used partially as a dormitory, and today is home to the Department of Classics, Department of Russian Language and Literature, Comparative Literature Program, Jewish Studies Program, and Linguistics and Cognitive Science Program.	
Rockefeller Hall		1983	Named after U.S. vice president and Dartmouth alumnus Nelson Rockefeller, this annex to Silsby Hall contains the Department of Economics and the Nelson A. Rockefeller Center for Public Policy and the Social Sciences.	
Sanborn House		1929	Sanborn House houses the English Department.	
Shattuck Observatory		1854	Shattuck is an observatory and is the oldest scientific building at Dartmouth. It stands on a hill behind the Sherman Fairchild Physical Sciences Center.	
Fairchild Building		1972–1974	Part of the Sherman Fairchild Physical Sciences Center, the Fairchild Building houses the Department of Geography and the Department of Earth Sciences.	
Sherman House		1883	Originally the home of Dartmouth professor Frank A. Sherman, the Sherman House belonged to Sigma Phi Epsilon fraternity from 1928 until the 1950s. Today, it houses Dartmouth's Native American Studies Program.	
Silsby Hall		1927–1928	Silsby Hall currently houses the Department of Anthropology, Department of Government, and Department of Sociology, Program in African and African-American Studies, Program in Latin American, Latino, and Caribbean Studies, and Program in Mathematics and Social Sciences.	
Steele Chemistry Building		1920–1921	Part of the Sherman Fairchild Physical Sciences Center, the Steele Building used to house the Chemistry department until its move to Burke Laboratory. It is used by the Department of Earth Sciences now and is home to the Environmental Studies Program and the Geochemistry laboratories.	
Sudikoff Hall		1968	Originally the mental health facility for the hospital that formerly stood nearby, Sudikoff now houses Computer Science and its laboratories.	
Thornton Hall		1828–1829	Thornton Hall was originally a dormitory. Today, it houses the Religion and Philosophy departments.	
Webster Hall		1901–1907	Originally an auditorium and concert hall, Webster Hall was temporarily home to the town's Nugget Theater and served as the location for Commencement ceremonies from 1908 to 1930. In 1998, the building was redesigned to house the Rauner Special Collections Library.	
Wentworth Hall		1828–1829	Wentworth served as a dormitory until 1912, when major internal reconstruction transformed it into academic and office space.	
Wilder Hall		1897–1899	Part of the Sherman Fairchild Physical Sciences Center, Wilder Hall houses the Physics and Astronomy Department.	
Wilson Hall		1884–1885	Wilson was built as the first library building of the college. It later housed the anthropology department and the college museum, before the latter was moved to the Hood Museum of Art. Currently, Wilson houses film studios, the Film and Media Studies Department, and a practice hall.	

=== House communities system ===
Dartmouth operates a system of six residential colleges (called "houses") similar to those found at fellow Ivy League institutions Harvard and Yale as well as the universities of Oxford and Cambridge in the United Kingdom. Although every Dartmouth undergraduate is a member of a house, some students choose to live in Greek houses, unaffiliated on-campus housing or move off campus entirely. Dartmouth houses approximately 3,300 students in its facilities, or about 85% of the student body; the remaining 15% opt to live in off-campus housing.

==== Allen House ====
Building	Image	Constructed	Capacity	Notes	Reference
Gile Hall		1928	112	Gile Hall, named for trustee John M. Gile, cost $208,000 to build. It was operated as the "U.S.S. Gile" during World War II.	
Lord Hall		1929	78	Lord Hall, named for trustee John K. Lord, was built alongside Streeter Hall for a combined $297,000.	
Streeter Hall		1929	67	Streeter Hall, named for trustee General Frank S. Streeter, was built alongside Lord Hall for a combined $297,000. The ground floor was remodeled in 1989 to include a kitchen and lounge.	
Wheeler Hall		1898	106	Wheeler Hall cost $83,135 to build. It was featured in a 1974 Pepsi commercial centering on the college's Winter Carnival tradition. Wheeler houses Allen House freshmen.	
Richardson Hall		1905	63	Richardson is the oldest building on campus still used as a residence hall. It cost $49,013 to build. Room 108 housed the unofficial headquarters of Dartmouth Outing Club sub-group Cabin & Trail from 1968 to 1982. Richardson houses Allen House freshmen.	

==== East Wheelock House ====
Building	Image	Constructed	Capacity	Notes	Reference
Andres Hall		1987	84		
McCulloch Hall		1987	78	McCulloch Hall, named for trustee Norman E. McCulloch, Jr. '50, is the most recent addition to the cluster. The $8 million building features an "unconventional" communal bathroom system and basement classroom facilities.	
Morton Hall		1987	84	Morton Hall was renovated in 2017 after a 2016 fire.	
Zimmerman Hall		1987	86		

==== North Park House ====
Building	Image	Constructed	Capacity	Notes	Reference
Ripley Hall		1930	44		
Smith Hall		1930	46	Notable past residents include Robert Reich '68, who lived in room 208 during his freshman year.	
Woodward Hall		1930	47		
Brown Hall		1958	77	Brown Hall is named for trustee Albert O. Brown. Brown Hall houses North Park House freshmen.	

==== School House ====
Building	Image	Constructed	Capacity	Notes	Reference
Hitchcock Hall		1913	84	Named for the Hitchcock Estate on which it was built, Hitchcock Hall served briefly as a barracks in 1918. It opened in January 2008 for Winter Term after undergoing extensive renovation and remodeling.	
North Massachusetts Hall		1912	68	"North Mass" was once home to U.S. Congressman Paul Tsongas '62 in room 301.	
Massachusetts Hall		1907	115	Generally called "Mid Mass," this dormitory cost $80,000 to build. Notable past residents include U.S. Surgeon General C. Everett Koop '37 in room 310, television host Fred Rogers '50 in room 101, and football coach Dave Shula '81 in room 107.	
South Massachusetts Hall		1912	68	"South Mass" functioned as a sick bay for the Naval Training School that operated at Dartmouth during World War II. Notable past residents include actor Andrew Shue '89 in room 305.	
Bissell Hall		1958	76	Bissell Hall is connected to Cohen, with which it shares a lounge. Bissell Hall houses School House freshmen.	
Cohen Hall		1958	77	Suite 103 of Cohen Hall was notably the residence of future Finnish prime minister Paavo Lipponen during his year at Dartmouth, 1960–1961, as well as future IBM CEO Louis V. Gerstner, Jr. Cohen Hall houses School House freshmen.	
Little Hall		1958	75	Little Hall is named for Trustee Clarence B. Little. Little Hall houses School House freshmen.	

==== South House ====
Building	Image	Constructed	Capacity	Notes	Reference
New Hampshire Hall		1908	100	New Hampshire Hall, known as "New Hamp", cost $80,000 to build. It was remodeled in 1928–1930, and will undergo complete renovation starting in 2008. Notable past residents include Reggie Williams '76 who lived in room 211 during his freshman year.	
Topliff Hall		1920	173	Named for benefactor Elijah M. Topliff, this residence hall cost $355,000 to build. It was built to accommodate the post-World War I influx of students, and when constructed, was the largest dormitory on campus. Notable past residents include Dr. Seuss (Theodor Geisel) '25 in room 416 and Louise Erdrich '76 in room 303.	
The Lodge		1961	74	The Lodge was originally the Hanover Inn Motor Lodge, located on Lebanon Street in downtown Hanover. It was converted for student use in 1974.	
North Fayerweather Hall		1907	56	"North Fayer" cost $30,530 to build and was joined to Fayerweather Hall in 1984–1985 by a subterranean passage. "North Fayer" houses South House freshmen.	
Fayerweather Hall		1900	107	Fayerweather Hall, now known as "mid-Fayer," cost $44,060 when it was constructed at the turn of the 20th century. It became a barracks in 1918 and was completely reconstructed in 1928–1930. "Mid-Fayer" houses South House freshmen.	
South Fayerweather Hall		1907	63	"South Fayer", which cost $35,686 to build, burned to its skeleton in December 1909; students escaped by jumping from their windows. Notable past residents include Dartmouth Outing Club founder Fred Harris '11, who injured his knee escaping the fire. The building was rebuilt in 1910. "South Fayer" houses South House freshmen.	

==== West House ====
Building	Image	Constructed	Capacity	Notes	Reference
Russell Sage Hall		1923	122	Russell Sage is the oldest building of West House, named after the Russell Sage Foundation and designed in part by architect John Russell Pope. The Hyphen, a lounge constructed in 1988–1989, connects Russell Sage to Butterfield Hall.	
Butterfield Hall		1940	55	Butterfield was named for philanthropist Ralph Butterfield (class of 1839), who donated the school's natural history museum (since demolished). It was the last pre-World War II dormitory constructed at Dartmouth. The Hyphen, a lounge constructed in 1988–1989, connects Butterfield to Russell Sage Hall.	
Fahey Hall		2006	86		
McLane Hall		2006	126		
French Hall		1962	98	French Hall was remodeled in 1985 and houses West House freshmen.	
Judge Hall		1962	87	Judge Hall houses West House freshmen.	

=== Unaffiliated housing ===
Building	Image	Constructed	Capacity	Notes	Reference
Berry Hall		2006	43		
Bildner Hall		2006	61		
Byrne Hall		2006	49		
Goldstein Hall		2006	39		
Rauner Hall		2006	75		
Thomas Hall		2006	75		
Channing Cox Hall		1976	68	Channing Cox, along with Maxwell Hall, is an apartment facility.	
Maxwell Hall		1982	68	Maxwell, along with Channing Cox, is an apartment facility.	
North Hall		1923	19	North Hall was built as a dormitory for the Clark Preparatory School. It was acquired by the college in 1953. North Hall is the smallest of the college's residence halls.	
Ledyard Apartments		1921	18	The Ledyard Apartments were originally constructed to house new faculty members. Today, they provide apartment-style living for upperclass students.	
Chinese Language House		1951	8	The building was built as a residence for the headmaster of the Clark Preparatory School. It became the Asian Studies Center in 1985 and the Chinese Language House in 2007.	
Brewster Hall		1938	26	Originally constructed to house employees of the Hanover Inn, Brewster Hall also served as the house for Epsilon Kappa Theta sorority before hosting the International House in 1994.	
Cutter-Shabazz Hall		1938	26	Cutter-Shabazz Hall was built for the Clark Preparatory School and purchased by Dartmouth in 1953. Since 1970, it has been the home of the Afro-American Society and El-Hajj Malik El-Shabazz Center for Intellectual Inquiry.	
Foley House		1931 or later	10	By the mid-1980s, Dartmouth had acquired this privately owned building and began using it as an Outward Bound House. Foley House houses the Foley Cooperative, where residents communally participate in cooking, eating, and household chores.	
La Casa		1820 ca.	10	This house was initially operated as a private hospital before coming into the hands of private citizens, including a dean of the Thayer School of Engineering. The college acquired it around 1936. La Casa is an affinity house for students interested in Spanish languages and cultures.	
Native American House		1852	16	This structure first served as a bakery and confectionery. In the early 20th century, it was owned by Lambda Chi Alpha and Pi Lambda Theta fraternities. During the 1960s, it became the Occom Inn, before finally being purchased by the college in 1993. It now serves as the Native American House, providing "cultural, social and educational enrichment for Native and other Dartmouth students."	
Pike House		1874	14	This building served as a dormitory until the 1920s, also housing Epsilon Kappa Phi fraternity. Since 1999, it has been known as the Latin American, Latino and Caribbean (LALACS) House.	

=== Greek houses and other undergraduate societies ===
Building	Image	Constructed	Notes	Reference
Alpha Chi Alpha		1896	The Alpha Chi Alpha house was built and owned by the Emery family before being occupied by Alpha Chi Rho fraternity between 1956 and 1961. In 1963, the organization became Alpha Chi Alpha.	
Alpha Delta		192X	Alpha Delta Phi built this house to replace their prior home on the same plot. In 1969, the name was changed to Alpha Delta.	
Alpha Theta		1940–1941	The Alpha Theta house, built by ΑΘ's predecessor fraternity Theta Chi, was a replacement for an older building whose furnace leaked, killing nine house members.	
Amarna		192X	Amarna, a college undergraduate society, moved into this house on East Wheelock Street in 1993.	
Beta Alpha Omega		1931	After being removed from campus in 1997, Beta Theta Pi was reformed as Beta Alpha Omega in the fall of 2008, re-occupying its house after renting it to sorority Alpha Xi Delta during its time off-campus.	
Bones Gate		1925	Bones Gate, formerly Delta Tau Delta, moved into this house from an older structure on North Main Street. It was rebuilt following a fire in 1929.	
Casque and Gauntlet		1823	This house at 1 South Main Street houses Casque & Gauntlet, a senior society founded in 1886.	
Chi Gamma Epsilon		1937	Kappa Sigma, later Chi Gamma Epsilon, built this structure as a replacement for their 1915 building.	
Chi Heorot		1929 c.	The Chi Heorot house at 11 East Wheelock Street was built to replace their 1795 structure.	
Cobra Hall		1898-1915 ca.	This college-owned house at 13 Summer Street served as Dartmouth's Hillel house before the Roth Center for Jewish Life was finished in 1998. It is now used by Cobra, a women's senior society founded in 1979.	
Chi Delta		1898	The Chi Delta house was built as a faculty duplex, and its halves were variously occupied by Alpha Phi Alpha fraternity and college substance-free housing. Tri-Delta occupied the house around 1992, and its two halves were joined around 1994. In 2015, Tri-Delta disaffiliated from the national organization and became Chi Delta.	
Dragon Society		1995–1996	The Dragon Society's former tomb was demolished to make way for Berry Library, and the college helped build this one as replacement. It stands on a hill overlooking College Street.	
Epsilon Kappa Theta		1896	This house was built for a professor and was leased to the Mary Hitchock Memorial Hospital School of Nursing during the 1940s. After being occupied by a number of failed coeducational societies, it was obtained by the college. EKT began renting it in 1991.	
Fire & Skoal House		1893-1896 ca.	Fire & Skoal, a senior society, has occupied this building on Park Street since 1984.	
Gamma Delta Chi		1936 ca.	This house was built following the merger of two societies to form Gamma Delta Chi. The house has an underground basketball court underneath the porch.	
Kappa Delta Epsilon		1898–1899	Privately owned until 1950, the house was used as the initial location of the Foley House until Alpha Chi Omega, eventually KDE, obtained it in 1984.	
Kappa Kappa Gamma		1842	Originally standing on the site of the east entrance to Baker Library, this house was moved to its present location on East Wheelock Street in the 1920s. Kappa Kappa Gamma has occupied it since before 1986.	
Kappa Pi Kappa		1925	Tri-Kap's third residence, at 1 Webster Avenue, was funded by the college in return for the fraternity's property on the site of Silsby Hall. (Formerly known as Kappa Kappa Kappa)	
Panarchy		1835	Panarchy resides in an off-campus house with a Doric temple front and cupola. It was bought in the early 20th century by a local fraternity whose descendant, Phi Sigma Psi, became the current undergraduate society of Panarchy around 1992.	
Phi Delta Alpha		1902	Phi Delta Theta was the first fraternity to establish itself on Webster Avenue. In 1960, its name changed to Phi Delta Alpha.	
Phi Tau		2002	Phi Tau's current building was built as part of Dartmouth's construction of Berry Library and other north campus development.	
Psi Upsilon		1908	Psi Upsilon's house was constructed on an empty lot previously housing a local hatter.	
Sigma Alpha Epsilon		1931	This structure replaced Sigma Alpha Epsilon's house on the same site.	
Sigma Delta		1936–1937	Originally belonging to Phi Gamma Delta fraternity, the college bought this structure in the 1970s and rented it to Dartmouth's first sorority, Sigma Kappa (later Sigma Delta).	
Sigma Nu		1925	Sigma Nu's house at 12 Webster Avenue has undergone numerous alterations since its 1925 construction.	
Sigma Phi Epsilon		1896	This house was privately owned until at least 1950; the college acquired the property from the Cardigan Mountain School in 1953 and leased it to Sigma Phi Epsilon later that year. A wing was added in 1959. The fraternity purchased the property in 1964. In June 2010, the fraternity demolished the worn out and now inadequate building to make room for a new house completed at the end of 2010.	
Sphinx		1903	The Sphinx tomb on East Wheelock Street was designed by Manchester architect William M. Butterfield.	
The Tabard		1932	The Eta-Eta chapter of Sigma Chi fraternity, a descendant of a Chandler School society, built this house to replace a previous burned structure. The fraternity adopted the name The Tabard, a reference to Chaucer's Canterbury Tales, on April 20, 1960, and became coeducational in the 1970s.	
Theta Delta Chi		1925	This house stands on land used by Eleazar Wheelock for a garden. It was constructed in 1924 to replace the fraternity's earlier house on this site after it burned.	
Zeta Psi		1925	Zeta Psi began in 1853 but lapsed during the 1860s and late 19th century. It lost college recognition in 2001 but regained recognition in 2009.	

== Graduate school facilities ==
=== Geisel School of Medicine ===
The buildings of the Geisel School of Medicine are clustered on the north end of the Dartmouth campus, known as the "north campus."

Building	Image	Constructed	Notes	Reference
1 Rope Ferry Road		1937	1 Rope Ferry Road, originally called the Hitchcock Clinic, was renamed after the Dartmouth-Hitchcock Medical Center moved from Hanover to the neighboring city of Lebanon. It now houses administrative offices of the Medical School, including the Dean's Office.	
3 Rope Ferry Road		1893	Formerly the Women's Ward of the Mary Hitchcock Memorial Hospital, 3 Rope Ferry Road now serves as the Medical School's Admissions department.	
Dana Biomedical Library		1963–1964	Dana Biomedical Library, built with a grant from the Charles A. Dana Foundation. As of April 15, 2013, the Dana Biomedical Library has operated out of the 3rd floor of 37 Dewey Field Road. As of spring 2018 this building is being converted for other purposes.	
Kellogg Auditorium		1962	Kellogg Auditorium is a Medical School meeting forum connected to Remsen by a skybridge.	
Remsen Medical Sciences Building		1959–1960	Remsen, along with Vail, is one of the two main buildings of the Medical School campus, housing offices, labs, and classrooms.	
James D. Vail Medical Sciences Building		1971–1973	Vail is an eight-story building which, along with Remsen, houses the Medical School's offices, labs, and classrooms.	

=== Thayer School of Engineering ===
The Thayer School of Engineering is located adjacent to the Tuck School of Business on the western edge of campus, near the Connecticut River. It currently comprises three buildings, and it shares the Murdough Center (listed under Tuck) with the Tuck School of Business.

Building	Image	Constructed	Notes	Reference
Horace Cummings Memorial Hall		1939	This $200,000 building was built as the main facility of the Thayer School, with additional wings added in 1945–1947 and 1976.	
MacLean Engineering Sciences Center		2004–2006	Completed at a cost of just under $21 million, MacLean provides both research and teaching space for the Thayer School.	
Class of 1982 Engineering and Computer Science Center		2020–2022	Adjoined to MacLean, ECSC also houses faculty from the Department of Computer Science.	

=== Tuck School of Business ===
Like the Thayer School of Engineering, the Tuck School of Business is located in a complex on the western side of campus, along the Connecticut River.

Building	Image	Constructed	Notes	Reference
Buchanan Hall		1968	Originally called the "Tuck Mall Dorm", Buchanan is a Tuck dormitory. It contains 68 singles and five suites.	
Byrne Hall		1992	Byrne Hall contains classrooms, study/interview rooms, and a dining facility operated by Dartmouth Dining Services with seating in the PepsiCo Dining Room.	
Chase Hall		1930	Named after College alumnus Salmon P. Chase, Chase was originally built as a dormitory. Now, it contains the Tuck School's admissions and financial aid offices, as well as some faculty offices.	
Murdough Center		1973	The Murdough Center is shared by the Tuck School and the Thayer School. In addition to lecture halls and some offices, the center houses the Feldberg Business and Engineering Library. The name is derived from a large donation made to Dartmouth by Thomas G. Murdough, the founder of Little Tikes.	
Stell Hall		1930	Stell was originally a refectory, but upon the completion of Byrne Hall in the early 1990s, it was converted to a common space for students, faculty and staff with an events hall on the first floor and a mailroom and office services area below that. Stell Hall was named after Julia Stell, Edward Tuck's wife.	
Tuck Hall		1930	Tuck Hall serves as the main administrative building of the Tuck School.	
Achtmeyer, Pineau-Valencienne, and Raether Halls		2007–2008	Tuck's newest residence halls include residential rooms, study and conference rooms, a library, common kitchens, laundry room, and lounges. It also includes classrooms and a large common space, the McLaughlin Atrium in Raether Hall, with fireplace, sofas, and ample room to relax or study. A balcony, open in warmer months, has deck chairs, tables, and a view of the Connecticut River.	
Whittemore Hall		1999–2000	Whittemore Hall is a dormitory for Tuck students, housing 60 first-year students.	
Woodbury Hall		1930	Named after college alumnus Levi Woodbury, Woodbury Hall, originally built as a dormitory, was converted to office space in the late 1980s. It contains Tuck's five research centers.	

== Athletic and outdoor recreation buildings ==
Building	Image	Constructed	Notes	Reference
Alumni Gymnasium		1909–1910	Alumni Gymnasium serves as the center of Dartmouth's athletic facilities and includes two pools, a fitness center, a weight room, and an indoor track. It has undergone numerous remodelings, most recently in 2006.	
Berry Sports Center		1987	The Berry Sports Center holds racquetball and basketball facilities (Edward Leede Arena).	
Boss Tennis Center		2000	The Alexis Boss Tennis Center, located behind Thompson Arena, contains six regulation tennis courts. The attached Alan Gordon Pavilion provides locker rooms and a lounge.	
Davis Field House		1926	Davis Field House, which overlooks the Memorial Field track, is a facility for varsity athletic teams.	
Floren Varsity House		2006–2007	Floren, which opened in the fall of 2007, contains a strength training center, a sports classroom, meeting rooms, locker rooms, equipment storage, and team offices.	
Friends of Dartmouth Rowing Boathouse		1998–1999	The Boathouse, sitting on the banks of the Connecticut River north of the Ledyard Bridge, can store 30 rowing shells.	
Ledyard Canoe Club		1920	The building housing the Club sits along the Connecticut River and includes storage space for canoes, as well as a meeting room and kitchen.	
Leverone Field House		1962–1963	Designed by Italian architect Pier Luigi Nervi, Leverone contains an indoor track and tennis courts.	
Memorial Field		1921–1923	Memorial Field, Dartmouth's football and track & field stadium, was erected on the site of previous athletic grandstand built in 1893. It is named in memory of the Dartmouth alumni who died in World War I.	
Thompson Arena		1975	Thompson Arena, Dartmouth's hockey facility, was also designed by Pier Luigi Nervi.	
Tom Dent Cabin		1940	Tom Dent Cabin is a recreational cabin standing along the Connecticut River near the Ledyard Canoe Club.	

== Other facilities ==
Building	Image	Constructed	Notes	Reference
5 Rope Ferry Road		1913	5 Rope Ferry Road contained the maternity ward of the Mary Hitchcock Memorial Hospital. It is now home to the Department of Safety & Security, Dartmouth's campus police force.	
13 East Wheelock Street		18XX	13 East Wheelock Street was bought by the college at some point between 1950 and 1961. Since around 1997, it has been used as housing for faculty associated with the East Wheelock cluster.	
37 Dewey Field Road		1936–1937	37 Dewey Field Road was built as part of the MHMH School of Nursing. It now contains the IT department and technical support.	
Aquinas House		1961–1962	Aquinas House is the independent Catholic Students' Center, located at the end of Webster Avenue.	
Bartlett Tower		1885–1895	Bartlett Tower is a 71-foot (22 m) prospect tower located on a hill in the northeast corner of campus. It was erected by Dartmouth students over the course of ten years.	
Blunt Alumni Center		1810 ca.	The oldest part of the Blunt Alumni Center was a house built by Professor Zephaniah Swift Moore. It was bought by the college in 1884 and served as a dormitory called the Crosby House from 1896 until 1949, when the Alumni Records department moved in. Several additions have been added to the original house. Crosby House, the original structure built by Moore, is the oldest house in Hanover that remains on its original foundation. The Blunt Alumni Center also houses the Rassias Foundation.	
Choate House		1786	Choate House, originally standing near today's Webster Hall, was inhabited by a number of college professors and private owners before being sold to the college in 1910. It was modernized and moved several times, finally to its current location on North Main Street. It briefly housed part of the Mathematics Department.	
Collis Center		1901–1902	The Collis Center was constructed on the site of the burned Balch House, of which only the granite steps out front remain. Originally called "College Hall", it was expanded in 1993 to its current form. It serves as a student center and contains a café.	
Dartmouth Outing Club House		1928	Standing on the north end of Occom Pond, the Dartmouth Outing Club House is the DOC's Cross Country Ski Center and equipment rental location.	
Dean of the College House		1917 or later	This house, standing at 9 Choate Road, houses the current Dean of the college. It was formerly privately owned, and once held Aquinas House's functions.	
Dick's House		1927	Officially "Dick Hall's House", it is the college infirmary.	
Edgerton House		1960	Edgerton House is the Episcopal students' center.	
Fairbanks Hall North		1925	Fairbanks North originally held the Clark School gymnasium and stood on North Main Street before being moved to its current location and being adjoined to Fairbanks South.	
Fairbanks Hall South		1903–1904	Fairbanks South was built as the home of Beta Theta Pi fraternity. It is currently used by the William Jewett Tucker Foundation for Community Service.	
Hallgarten Hall		1873–1874	Hallgarten Hall was a dormitory for the New Hampshire College of Agriculture and the Mechanic Arts. It was purchased by Dartmouth in 1892 and served as a dorm until 1919, when it was used as an infirmary. It now holds the Bregman Electronic Music Studio.	
Hanover Inn		1887	The Hanover Inn is a college-owned hotel overlooking the College Green.	
Hood Museum of Art		1981–1983	The museum was previously housed in Carpenter, but it outgrew that space in the 1950s. The current 37,000-square-foot (3,400 m^{2}) Hood Museum was funded by Trustee Harvey Hood in 1978.	
McKenzie Hall		1931 ca.	McKenzie Hall is the home of Dartmouth's Facilities Operations & Management (FO&M) Department. It was originally constructed as a milk pasteurization plant.	
Montgomery House		1925	Montgomery House along Rope Ferry Road houses visiting Montgomery Fellows.	
Parker House		1917	Parker House in the ravine behind College Street currently houses various College offices.	
President's House		1926	The President's House stands on Webster Avenue along with twelve of Dartmouth's fraternities and sororities.	
Robinson Hall		1913–1914	Robinson Hall is the home of a variety of student organizations, including The Dartmouth, the Dartmouth Jack-O-Lantern, the Dartmouth Outing Club, and Dartmouth Broadcasting.	
Rollins Chapel		1884–1885	Rollins Chapel is Dartmouth's nondenominational chapel.	
Roth Center for Jewish Life		1996–1997	The Roth Center is a center for the Jewish community of Dartmouth and the surrounding area.	
Thayer Dining Hall		1937	Thayer Dining Hall is the center of student meal service, containing five dining operations.	
Webster Cottage		1780	Webster Cottage was, according to oral tradition, the home of student Daniel Webster during his senior year at Dartmouth. It passed through a variety of private hands, and now houses the Hanover Historical Society.	

== Planned buildings ==
Building	Scheduled	Notes	Reference
Class of 1953 Commons	2010–2011	The remodeling of Thayer Dining Hall.	
Class of 1978 Life Sciences Center	2009–2012	The new Life Sciences Building in the North Campus by the Dartmouth Medical School will replace Gilman Life Sciences Building. It will cost $93 million, and will be built on the land which now contains Strasenburgh, the Modular Laboratory, and Butler Hall. Bohlin Cywinski Jackson are the architects.	
Visual Arts Center	2010–2011	This new building for the Departments of Studio Art and Film & Television Studies will face Lebanon Street and replace Brewster and Clement Halls. Machado and Silvetti are the architects.	

== Former buildings ==
Building	Constructed	Demolished	Notes	Reference
Butterfield Museum	1895-1896	1928	Formerly housed the departments of geology, biology, ethnology, and archaeology. Also housed a museum of paleontology.	
