= Daniel Doan =

American novelist

Daniel Doan (February 23, 1914 – September 24, 1993) is best known for his classic hiking books, 50 Hikes in the White Mountains and 50 More Hikes in New Hampshire. He is also the author of two novels, The Crystal Years and Amos Jackman, and a memoir, Our Last Backpack.

His North Country history, Indian Stream Republic: Settling a New England Frontier, 1785–1842, grew out of his explorations in the Pittsburg area. Reviewing the book in the December 1997 issue of Appalachia, Gene Daniell wrote that it

"gives an excellent account of the history of the Indian Stream Republic, and it also provides an evocative picture of the life of the settlements, a life hard but curiously satisfying to those who had the will and the luck to make good. The reader will gain a great deal of insight into the lives of the people who settled the frontier regions of New England, most of whom are memorialized only by a weathered stone in a cemetery near a church or along a back road. In a real sense, this book is their living memorial."

Doan was born in Summit, New Jersey, the son of Frank Carleton Doan, a Unitarian minister. The family's summer home was in Orford, New Hampshire, where Doan's grandmother had been born. This area had a great influence on him, nurturing his love of the woods and mountains, hiking, and fishing. After his father's death in Winchester, Massachusetts, when Doan was fifteen, he moved with his mother to Hanover, New Hampshire, and lived in New Hampshire for the rest of his life.

Doan graduated from the Clark Preparatory School in Hanover in 1932 and Dartmouth College in 1936. Doan then went into farming with his wife, Ernestine Crone, in Orford and subsequently in Belmont. He also wrote short stories and articles. In 1939 his daughter Ruth was born, and in 1941 his daughter Penelope. The family moved to Laconia, New Hampshire, where Dan worked for a manufacturing company and continued writing, hiking, and fishing.

After Ernestine's death in 1982, he married Marjorie Marran and they moved to Jefferson, New Hampshire.

In July 1993, the Dartmouth Outing Club named a Smarts Mountain trail in Orford the Daniel Doan Trail, "in recognition of Daniel Doan's efforts to stimulate interest and involvement in hiking and the out-of-doors". Doan died on September 24 of that year in Lancaster, New Hampshire. The New Hampshire Writers' Project honored him posthumously with its 1994 Lifetime Achievement Award. His papers are archived at Dartmouth College, and daughter Ruth has continued to compile later editions of the hiking guidebooks under the original titles.

Doan's papers are held at Rauner Special Collections Library at Dartmouth College.
