= James Georgopoulos =

American painter

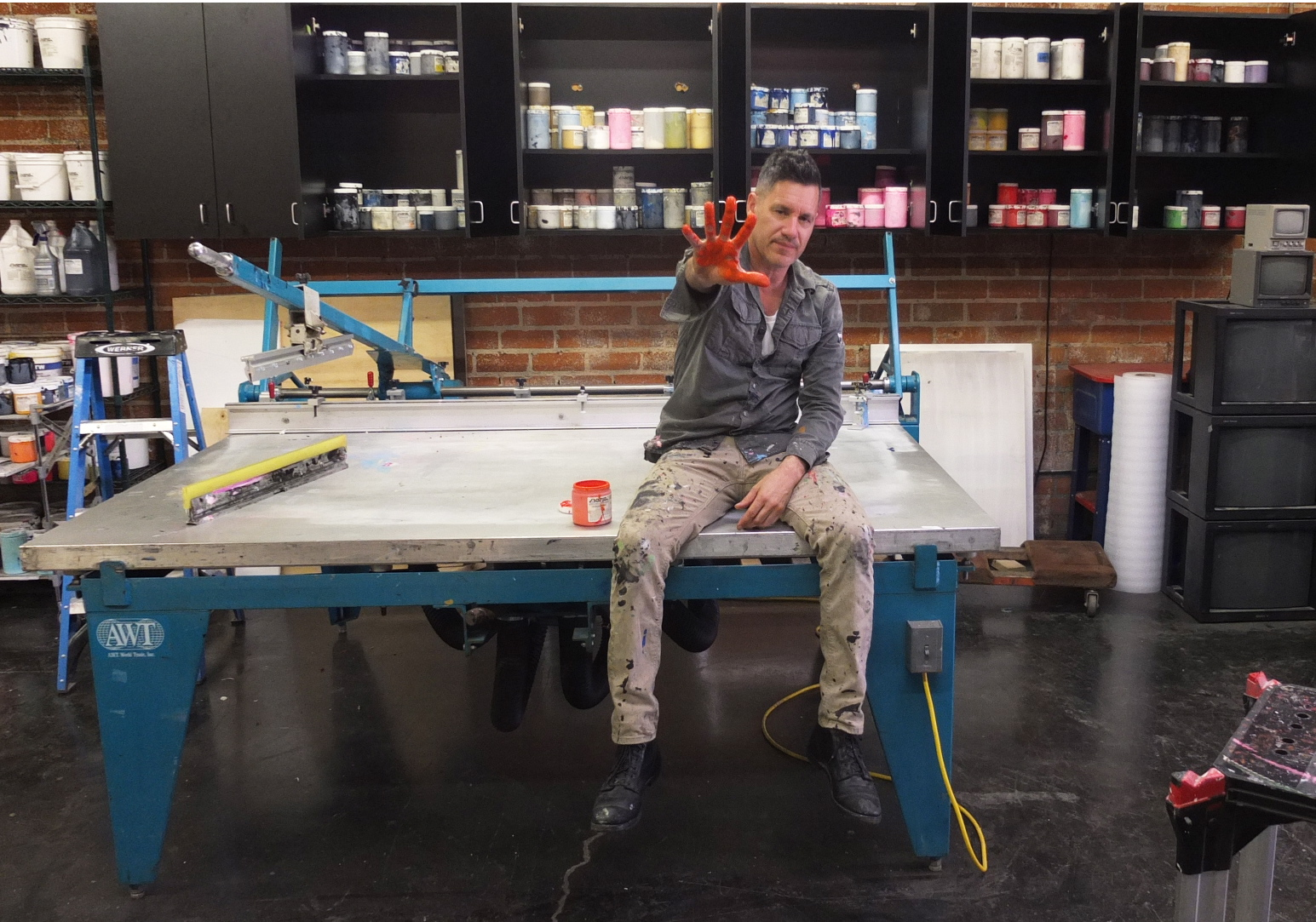
- Georgopoulos in his Venice studio in 2014
- Born: 1966 (age 59–60); Manchester, New Hampshire, United States
- Known for: Artist, Sculpture, Painting, Photography, Video Installation
- Website: www.jamesgeorgopoulos.org

James Georgopoulos (born 1966 in Manchester, New Hampshire) is a Greek-American visual artist. Georgopoulos works with painting, sculpture, and video installation to address a relationship between highly skilled production techniques, pop culture, and taboo iconography. His work is in various collections, including the Panavision USA Collection. He lives and works in Venice, California.

== Early life ==
Georgopoulos was born in Manchester, New Hampshire, and began creating visual works at the age of 14 while at Cardigan Mountain School. His father was an art collector and became friends with many of the artists he collected, exposing Georgopoulos to their studios at a young age. Georgopoulos was mentored by Varujan Boghosian, Robert Eshoo, Ivan Albright and James Aponovich when he was just a teenager, leading to his eventual acceptance to Rhode Island School of Design, which Georgopoulos declined for an opportunity in Italy. In his twenties, Georgopoulos was taken under the wing of György Kepes, who was part of the Bauhaus movement, spending many of his formative years in Kepes' studios and cites Kepes as a significant influence.

Georgopoulos relocated to Los Angeles in the early 1990s to work in the film industry with directors such as Oliver Stone and Zack Snyder, which eventually led to a career as an art director for commercials and music videos, including Pink Floyd's Take it Back. During this time, Georgopoulos also worked on several design projects, most notably for Eddie Sotto and Current TV.

== Work ==
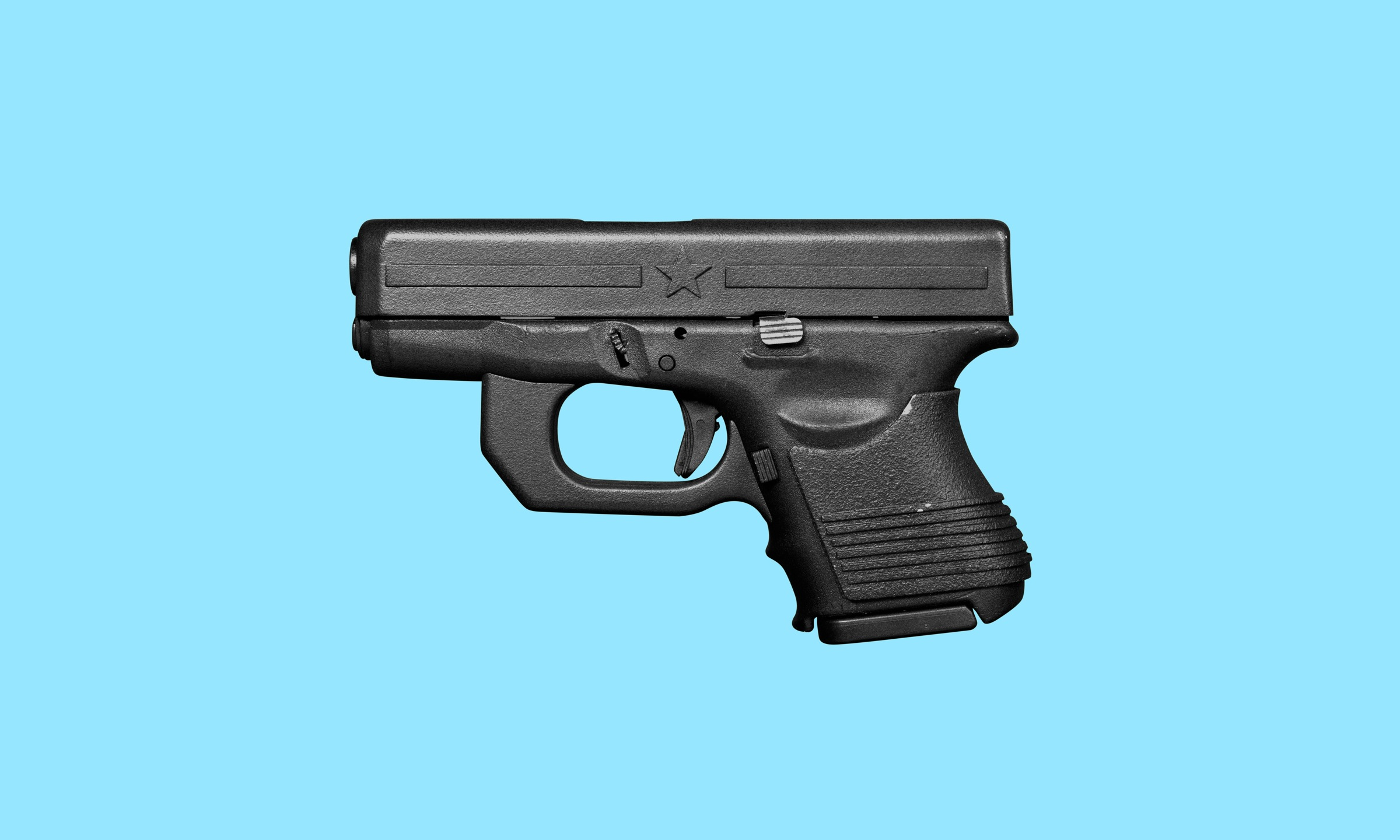
"love Triangle," unique silver gelatin, acrylic polymer, gesso, epoxy resin, automotive finishes, wood, aluminium, composite panel, 40 x 60 x 2 inches, (101.6 x 152.4 x 5.0 cm), Actual Gun used by Aaron Eckhart (Harvey Dent) on the Warner Bros. feature film, The Dark Knight (2008)

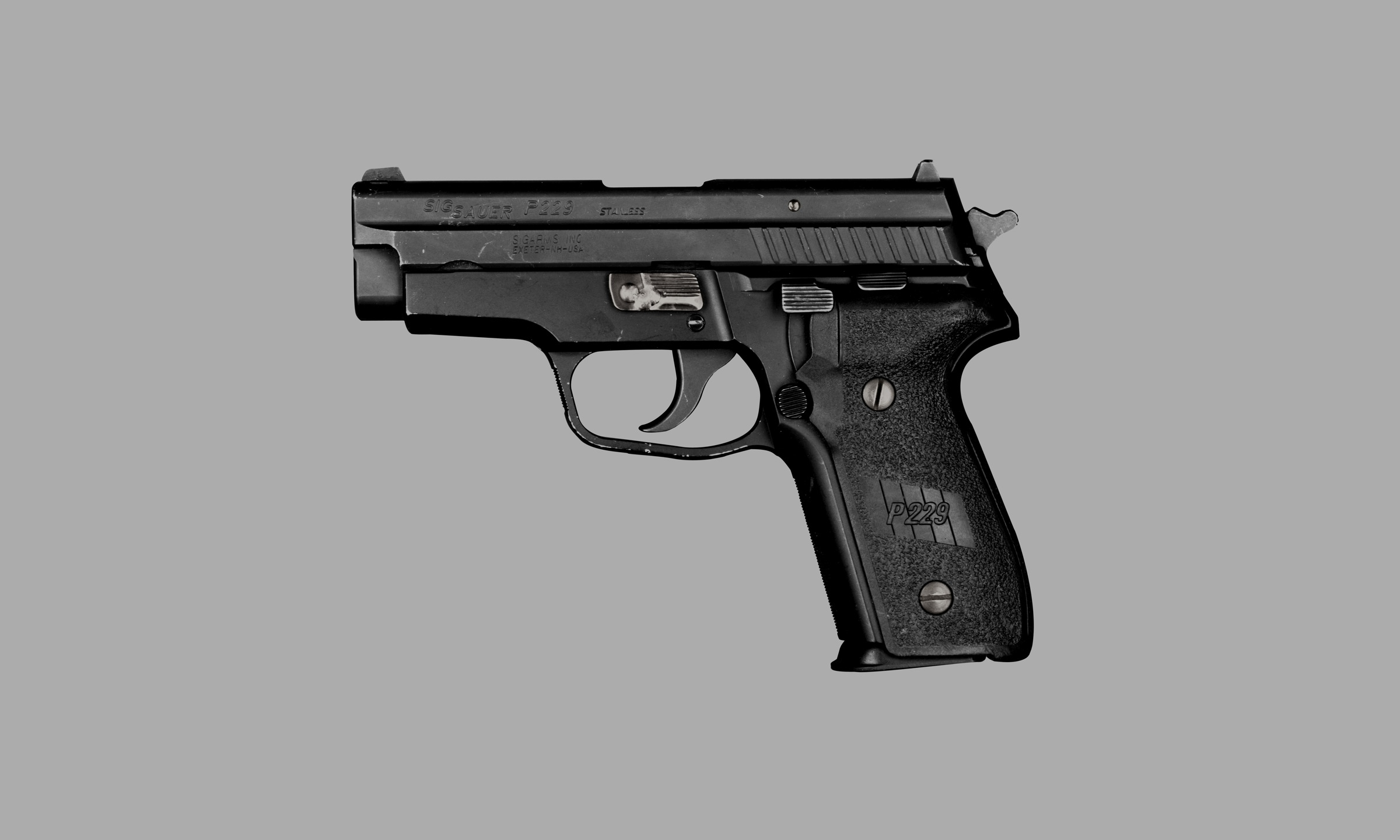
"sleeper agent,"unique silver gelatin, acrylic polymer, gesso, epoxy resin, automotive finishes, wood, aluminium, composite panel, 40 x 60 x 2 inches (101.6 x 152.4 x 5.0 cm), Actual gun used by Angelina Jolie in the Columbia Pictures feature film, SALT (2010)

In his paintings, Georgopoulos employs an assortment of subject matter, including guns used in blockbuster action films, cameras used to film classics, glossy automobile finishes, pornographic abstraction, and sexuality in art history to address issues of copyright protection, censorship, and the highly designed objects used in the creation of popular culture.

Using techniques that combine the artist’s intention, Georgopoulos has consistently worked with imagery that is generally considered off-limits. His work with weaponry, film, automobiles, and pornography is an exploration into male identity, and a self-inquiry into the reasons these objects and subjects are charged with the historical residue they contain.

Georgopoulos' paintings are meant to emulate the flat, transparent texture of the automobile-obsessed Finish Fetish artists of the 1960s such as Larry Bell, Billy Al Bengston, and Craig Kaufman, while his work with pornographic images—which, despite his tendency to use organic pixilated techniques, have been banned from galleries—calls to mind the controversial pieces that landed Wallace Berman in jail in the 1960s.

Georgopoulos has been featured in numerous publications including Flaunt, Bullett Magazine, Treats Magazine, and LA Weekly. He has exhibited internationally, including a solo exhibition at Photo L.A. 2014. He was included in Phillips de Pury’s contemporary sale in 2012, and was featured as the artist of honor in 2012 at the Art of Elysium Fifth Annual Heaven Gala.

=== Guns of Cinema ===
His series Guns of Cinema, a compilation of gun images from iconic motion pictures and television includes screen-used guns used by Al Pacino in Scarface, Lady Gaga in her music video "Born This Way", John Travolta in Pulp Fiction, Clint Eastwood in Dirty Harry, Arnold Schwarzenegger in Terminator 2: Judgment Day, John Malkovich in RED and Angelina Jolie in Salt. Georgopoulos photographs the live firearms at secured armories with large format film cameras. With the negatives, Georgopoulos makes silver gelatin prints by hand in his Venice, California darkroom and mounts the prints on composite panel. He then hand paints around the image with custom mixed layers of paint before multi layers of epoxy resin and automotive finish are applied to the top, achieving a mirror like reflective surface.

=== Cameras of Cinema ===
Similar to Guns of Cinema, the Cameras of Cinema series expresses Georgopoulos' affinity for the film and television industry as he photographed a number of motion picture and television cameras which were used to make Titanic, Star Wars, Michael Jackson's Thriller music video, James Bond, Kill Bill, and Apocalypto, among others.

=== Sculpture ===
Identity also plays a role in a series of sculptural retellings of Greek mythologies that Georgopoulos began working on at the end of 2013. This series contains works that are highly technical, utilizing found industrial elements to create idols of Greek gods, which serves to continue his exploration into post-industrial ideas of manufacture and mythmaking. He is also developing a series of sculptures that include video installations housed in shaped automobile frames, unveiled to the public in fall 2014 with Vacation.

For There is No End, a 2015 solo exhibition, Georgopoulos follows in the same lineage of artists such as John Chamberlain or even Marcel Duchamp, by using objects – old car parts, disused slot machines and other jettisoned materials – the artist investigates the self-cannibalizing culture of consumerism. In Rodeo Drive Georgopoulos displays the wrecked body of a Rolls-Royce Silver Shadow, powder coated in white and dripping in automotive gold chrome against a scaled video of famed Rodeo Drive, playing via projection.

In 2016, Georgopoulos' solo exhibition, The Earth is Flat, critiques the development of artificial intelligence (AI) and the values and hazards implicit to autonomous computing. This new body of work addresses technology’s integration and prevalence in the alteration of human life in the modern age. The artist’s four sculptures, Luddite, Zeus, Weight Watcher and Autonomous X12 themselves are superficially interconnected as to insinuate that technology has implemented itself as an indissoluble event in human history.

=== Shadows ===
Georgopoulos explores ways to deconstruct the car in a non-traditional visual form so the viewer can appreciate the massive size and power of a car but in the confines of an interior space. The result is a 1:1 scale flat panel homage to the vintage automobile; made in the measurement specifications (length and width) of the manufacturer dimensions, giving the appearance of the car being flattened from above.

The super flats are the first exploration of this series, in tribute to celebrated super car brands, Lamborghini, Ferrari, Aston Martin, McLaren, and Porsche.

== Selected exhibitions ==
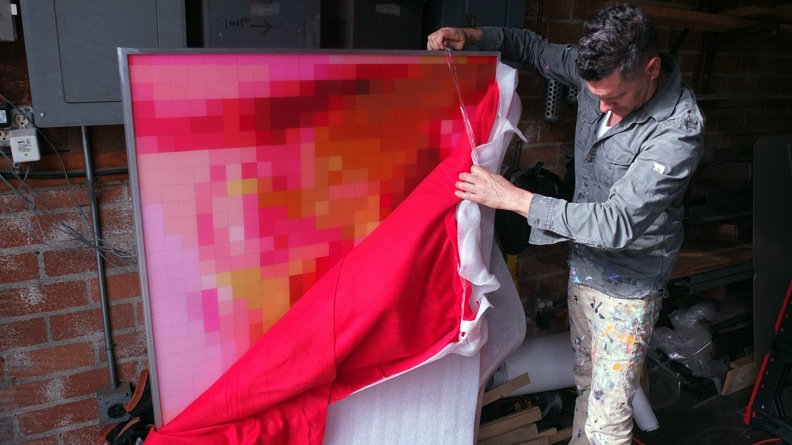
Georgopoulos in front of one of his paintings from the New Elements series, 2014

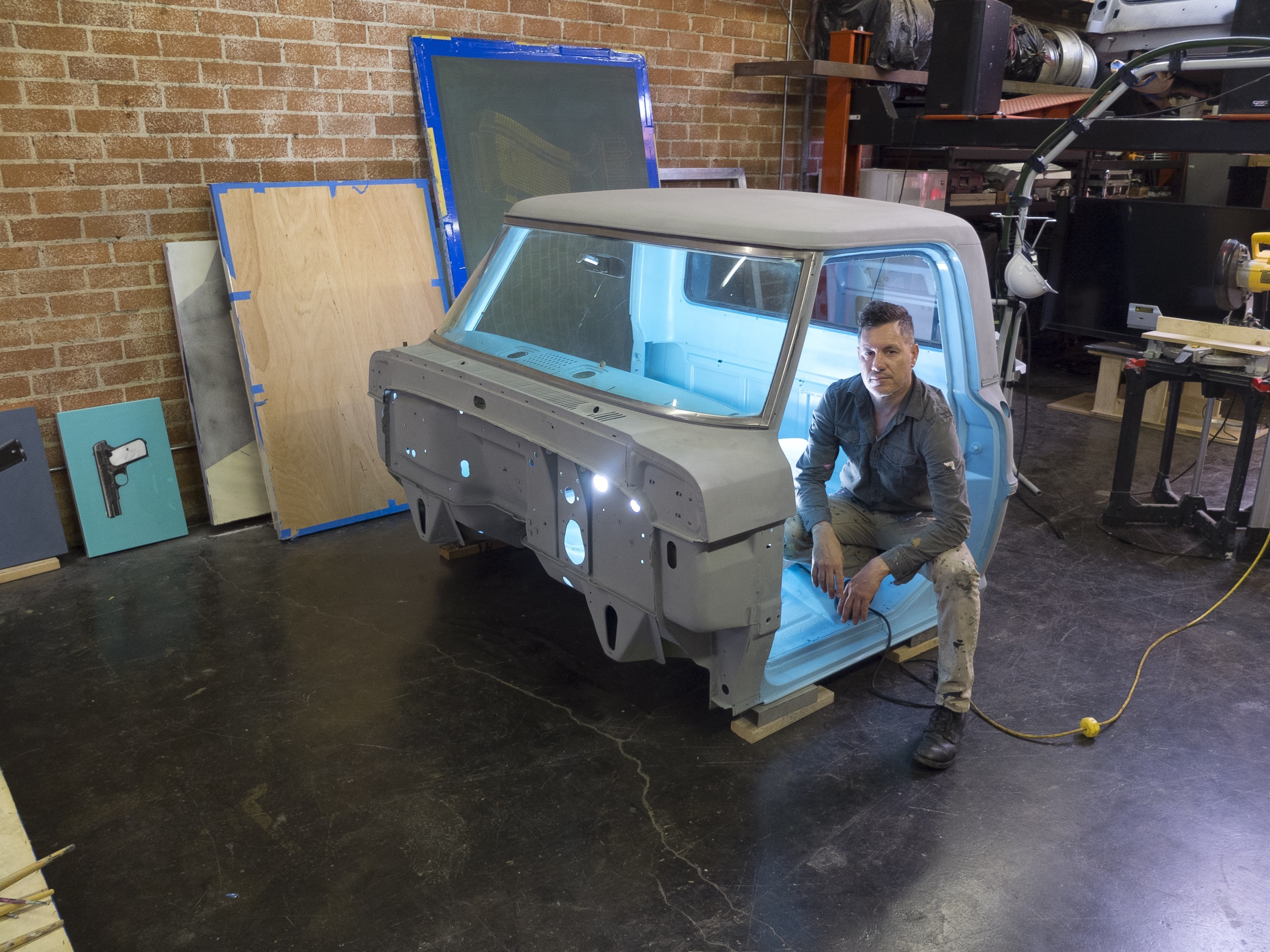
Georgopoulos in front of, "Vacation", work in progress, 2014

2016

- The Earth is Flat, Mama Gallery, Los Angeles

2015

- There is No End, Mama Gallery, Los Angeles
- Pieces of Heaven Art Auction

2014

- Pieces of Heaven Art Auction
- LA Art Show for Axiom Contemporary
