= Clark Preparatory School =

Coordinates: 43°42′25″N 72°17′23″W

Clark Preparatory School (also known as the Clark School) was a boys-only independent boarding school located in Hanover, New Hampshire, USA. It was founded in 1919 by Dr. Clifford Pease Clark, and its headmaster was Dr. Frank Millett Morgan, both of whom were former members of the faculty of nearby Dartmouth College. The school's primary purpose was "to prepare a boy adequately and thoroughly for College or Business, and to inculcate in him those basic principles and high ideals which tend toward the development of a manly character."

The Clark School prepared boys especially for Dartmouth College, though students matriculated at many other colleges and universities. Prominent alumni included Dr. Morgan's son, Professor Millett G. Morgan (1915–2002), who was founder of the Radiophysics Laboratory at the Thayer School of Engineering and a leading researcher in ionospheric physics, and the prominent hiking writer Daniel Doan.

The Clark School ceased independent operations in June 1953 when it was merged into Cardigan Mountain School in nearby Canaan, New Hampshire. Several of the Clark School's buildings as well as its playing fields in Hanover were purchased by Dartmouth College. Former Clark School properties that are now buildings owned by Dartmouth include Cutter-Shabazz Hall, the Chinese Language House, North Hall, and North Fairbanks Hall. Significantly, the land acquired from the Clark School in central Hanover allowed Dartmouth to begin construction in 1956 of the Choate cluster, the first Modernist buildings on the college's campus.

== Sources ==
- Hopkins, Robert C.; Rearick, Richard R. (1995). Cardigan Mountain School: History, 1945-1995. Littleton, NH: Sherwin Dodge. pp. 81–88.
- Scott Meacham (2001). "Notes Toward a Catalog of the Buildings and Landscapes of Dartmount College" (PDF). Dartmo.: The Buildings of Dartmouth College.
