= Butterfield Museum =

Demolished academic building at Dartmouth College

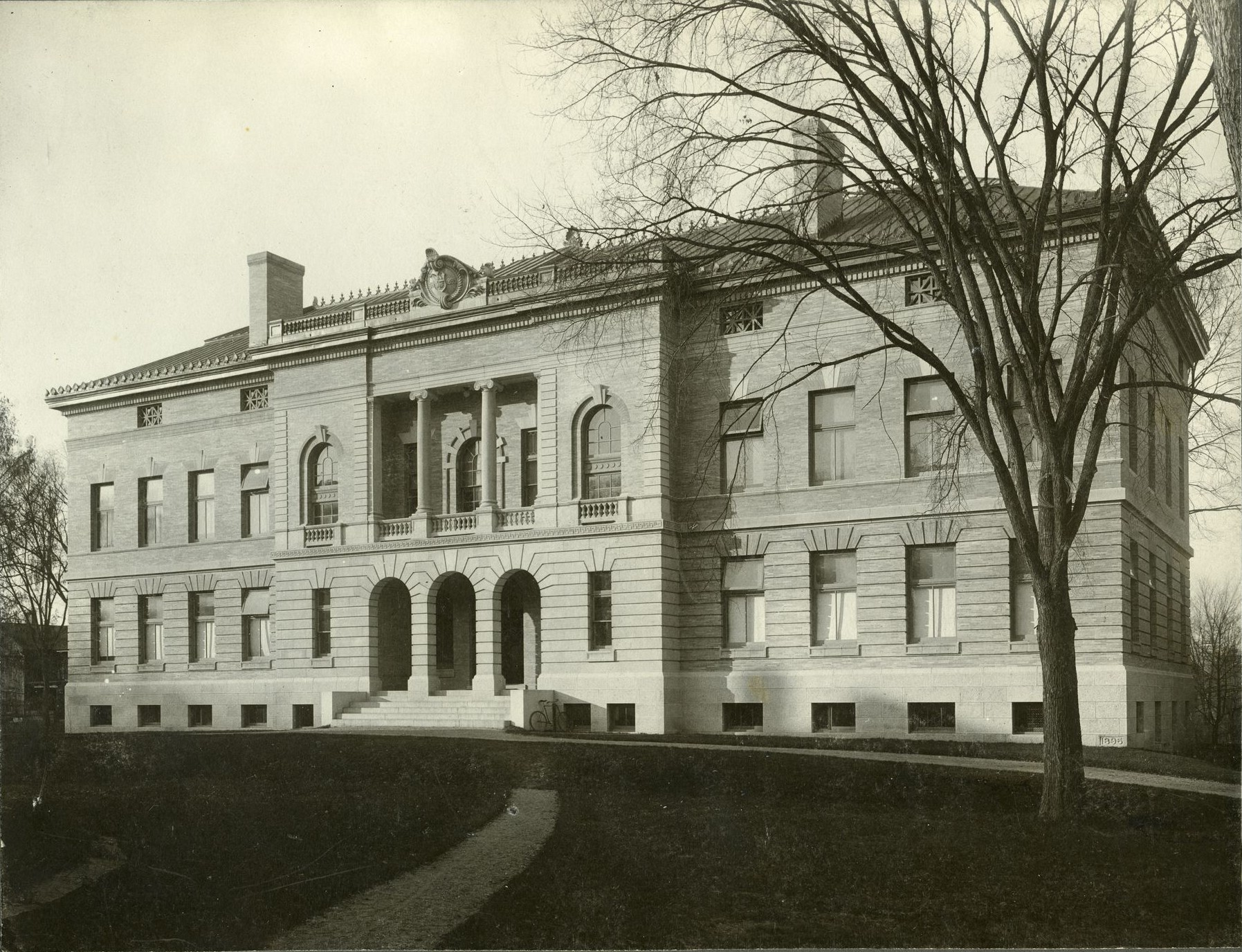
- Interactive map of the Butterfield Museum area

General information
- Architectural style: Italian Renaissance
- Coordinates: 43°42′19″N 72°17′19″W
- Year built: 1895-1896
- Demolished: 1928
- Cost: $87,373

Technical details
- Material: Roman brick
- Floor count: 4

Design and construction
- Architect: Charles A. Rich

The Butterfield Museum was an academic building at Dartmouth College that housed the school's biology, archaeology, and ethnology departments as well as a museum of paleontology. Designed by Charles A. Rich and built in 1896, the building was named after Dartmouth alum Ralph Butterfield, who funded its construction in his will.

The building was constructed in the Italian Renaissance style and featured a yellow Roman brick facade, which caused it to stand out among the other buildings on Dartmouth's campus. It was ultimately demolished in 1928 to make way for the Fisher Ames Baker Memorial Library.

== History ==
In 1893, College President William Jewett Tucker developed an initiative for the expansion of Dartmouth's campus. Architect Charles A. Rich, himself a Dartmouth alum, presented the first master plan for the expansion soon after Tucker's inauguration in February 1893. Although no records of this original plan have survived, it was described as featuring "efficiency, beauty and an almost hygienic separation of uses into distinct buildings."

On June 8, 1894, the Trustees of Dartmouth College approved the construction of part of Rich's plans, which included a plan to construct a quadrangle north of the Dartmouth Green. The location was chosen at the advice of landscape architect Charles Eliot, who argued that the alternative area for expansion, to the east of the Green along College Park, would have been costly due to the need for grading and would have damaged the campus' natural beauty. At the time, the chosen location was occupied by residential properties. The college began purchasing the properties to make way for the development, and a new area for residential development was made available along Occom Ridge to the north to compensate.

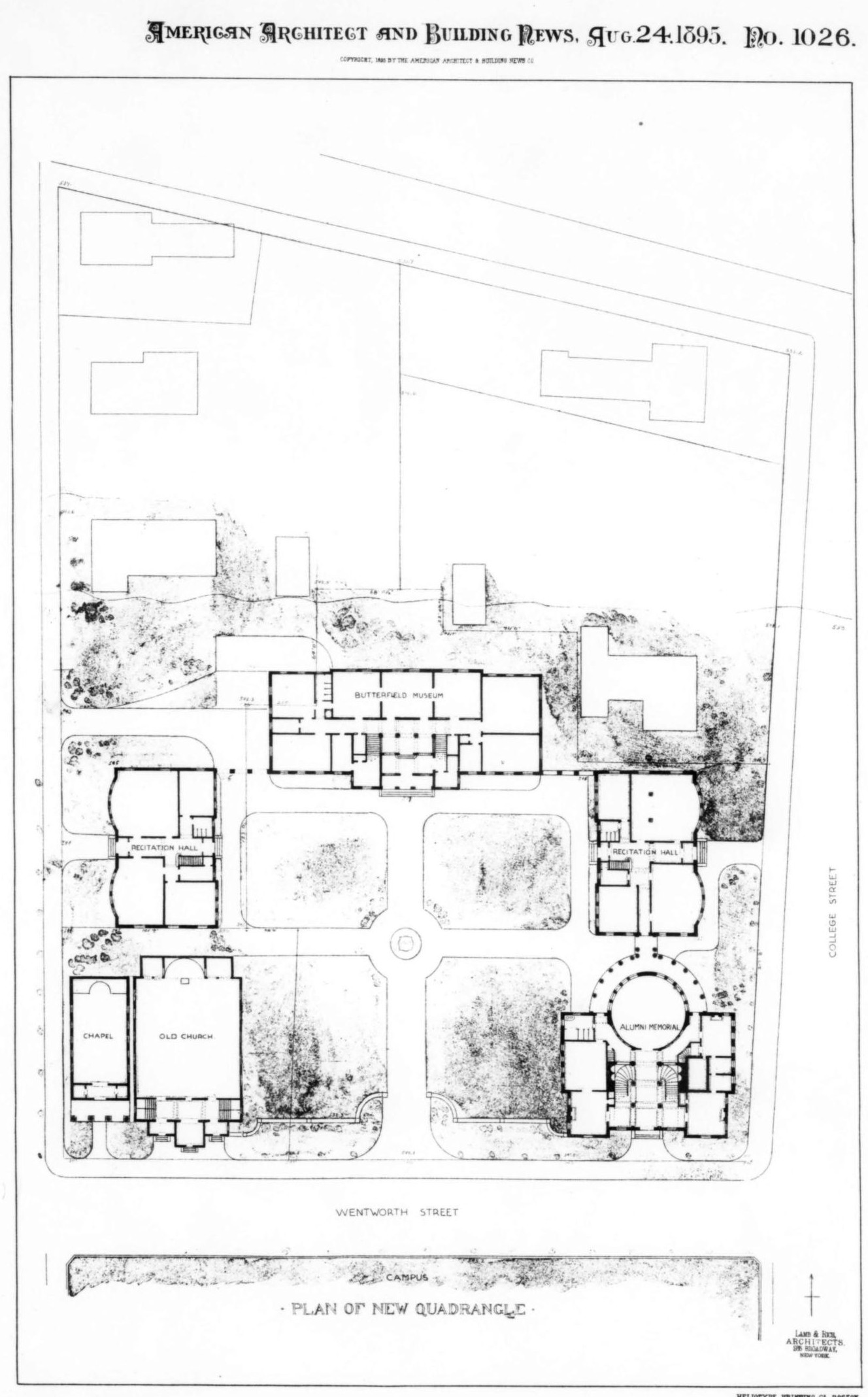
Illustration of the 1895 design for the new quadrangle, with the Butterfield Museum shown at the northern end

Rich published the design for the quadrangle in 1895, which included plans for the Butterfield Museum to be constructed at its northern end. The building's namesake was Class of 1839 graduate Ralph Butterfield, who had died in 1892 and left $141,526 in his will for the College, which was at the time the second largest donation the school had ever received. In his will, Butterfield directed the Trustees to construct a building to house paleontological, archaeological, and ethnological specimens. The Butterfield Museum was the first of Rich's designs to be built at Dartmouth. Its cornerstone was laid during the commencement of the 1895 school year, and it was completed the following year at a cost of $87,373, which was sourced from Ralph Butterfield's will.

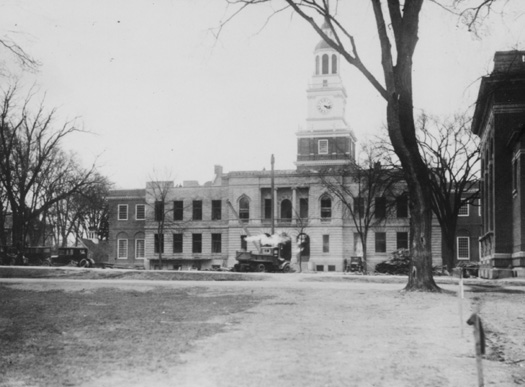
Butterfield Museum under demolition in 1928, with Baker Library visible in the background

The building was used by the Telephone Department of the D.C. Training Detachment from 1917 to 1918 for the war effort. During the 1920s, the College established committees to study the construction of a new, central library for the school, which would become the Baker Library. Meanwhile, Butterfield's yellow-brick exterior was unpopular as it stood out among the otherwise Georgian, red-brick buildings on Dartmouth's campus. Once the committees determined that Butterfield's demolition would pose "no legal difficulty", the College settled on the museum's central location for the construction of Baker, and the demolition of Butterfield began in 1928 to make way for the new library. Baker was constructed just to the north of Butterfield, and its construction was simultaneous with Butterfield's demolition, which was done in order to allow more open views of Baker. Much of Butterfield's collections was moved to Wilson Hall, and its laboratories and offices were replaced by Silsby Hall, which was constructed from 1927 to 1928.

== Design and collections ==
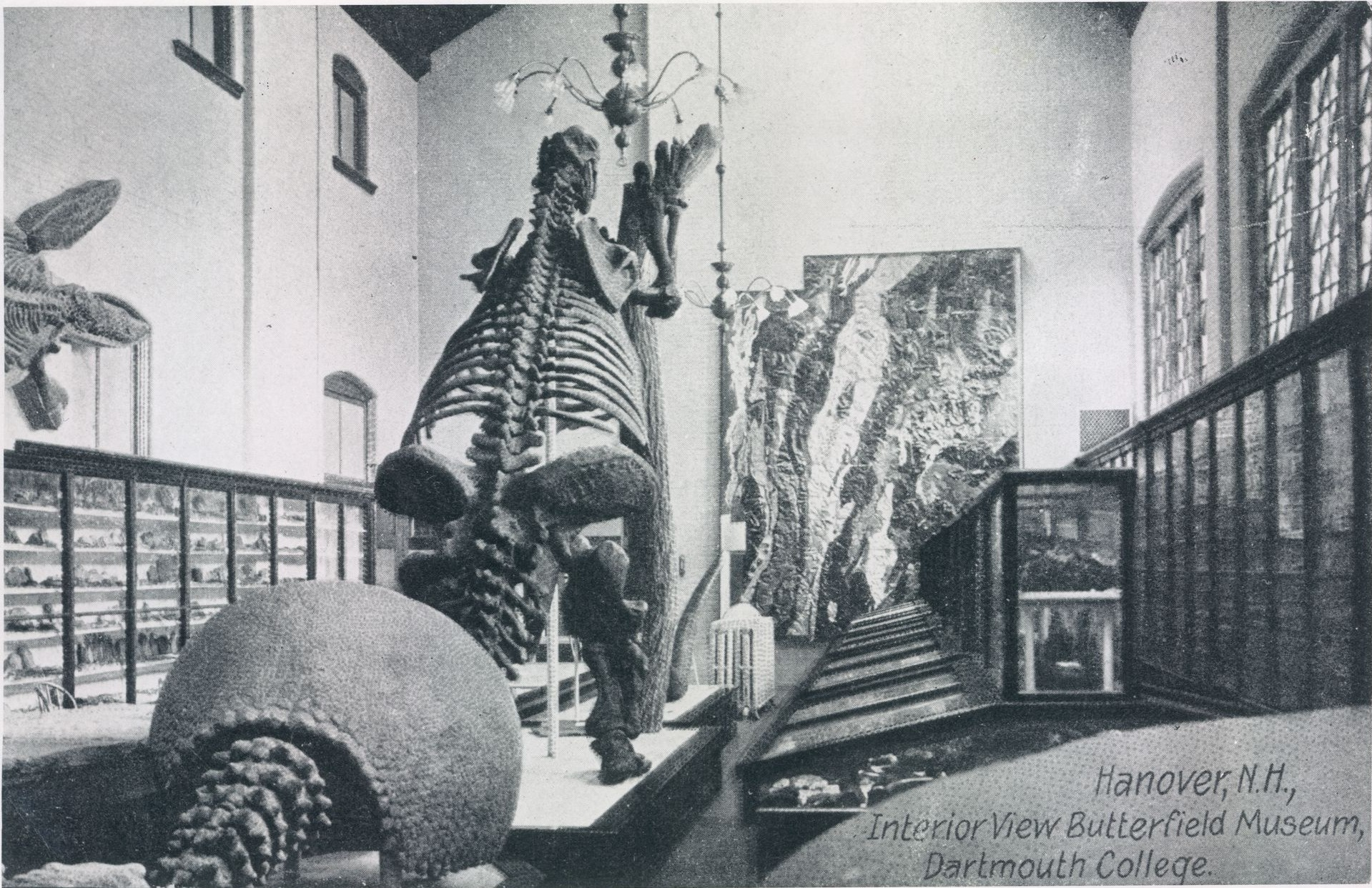
The interior of Butterfield Museum

The Butterfield Museum was designed by Charles A. Rich in the Italian Renaissance style and was located at the northern end of a quadrangle formed along with Webster Hall and the College Church. Measuring 145 by 55 feet (44 by 17 m), the building featured a granite foundation, yellow Roman brick facade, and copper roof, and it had three stories and a basement. The building's first floor housed the biology department, and its second floor housed the geology and ethnology departments. A two-floor exhibition room measuring 30 by 80 feet (9.1 by 24.4 m) extended from part of the second floor through the third floor to a trussed roof 35 feet (11 m) above the exhibition floor. The exhibition room was largely devoted to paleontology and contained the College's dinosaur skeleton. The building also stored the College's mineral cabinets. The building furthermore had a second-floor library at its front in addition to other smaller museum rooms, and its basement housed laboratories.
