= Deron Quint =

American ice hockey player (born 1976)

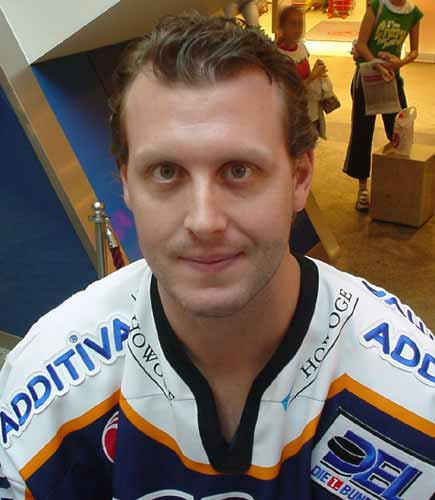
- Quint during his time with Eisbären Berlin
- Born: March 12, 1976 (age 49) Durham, New Hampshire, U.S.
- Height: 6 ft 2 in (188 cm)
- Weight: 219 lb (99 kg; 15 st 9 lb)
- Position: Defense
- Shot: Left
- Played for: Winnipeg Jets; Phoenix Coyotes; New Jersey Devils; Columbus Blue Jackets; Chicago Blackhawks; Eisbären Berlin; New York Islanders; Neftekhimik Nizhnekamsk; Spartak Moscow; CSKA Moscow; Traktor Chelyabinsk; EHC München
- National team: United States
- NHL draft: 30th overall, 1994; Winnipeg Jets
- Playing career: 1995–2017

Deron Timothy Quint (born March 12, 1976) is an American former professional ice hockey defenseman. His playing experience included spending time in the National Hockey League with the Winnipeg Jets, Phoenix Coyotes, New Jersey Devils, Columbus Blue Jackets, Chicago Blackhawks and New York Islanders.

== Playing career ==
As a youth, Quint played in the 1989 and 1990 Quebec International Pee-Wee Hockey Tournaments with a minor ice hockey team from Rye, New York.

Quint was drafted 30th overall by Winnipeg in the 1994 NHL entry draft As a rookie in the 1995–96 season, by scoring two goals in a four-second span, he tied an NHL record originally set by Nels Stewart of the Montreal Maroons in 1931. The next season the Jets became the Phoenix Coyotes and Quint remained with Phoenix until he was traded to the New Jersey Devils on March 7, 2000, for Lyle Odelein. Quint would only play four regular-season games for the Devils before being traded to the expansion Columbus Blue Jackets on June 23 the same year where he stayed for two seasons leading the Blue Jackets in minutes played per game. For the 2002–03 season, Quint rejoined the Coyotes for a second campaign, and he later joined the Chicago Blackhawks the next season.

During the NHL lockout, which resulted in the 2004–05 season being cancelled, Quint played for Bolzano HC in Italy. He later played for Kloten in Switzerland.

In 2005, Quint joined Eisbären Berlin of Germany's Deutsche Eishockey Liga and led them to 3 league championships in 4 seasons. At the end of the 2006–07 DEL season, he signed with the New York Islanders and returned to the NHL, playing five games and assisting them in making the playoffs. He returned to the Eisbaren for the 2007–08 DEL season while becoming the DEL Defenseman of the Year and leading the Bears to another league championship. Quint led all scoring for defenseman during the 08-09 season, while setting a franchise record of playing in 237 consecutive games and winning a 3rd DEL Championship. Quint was a DEL All-Star defenseman for three seasons.

After four years in Berlin, Quint left Germany and signed with HC Neftekhimik Nizhnekamsk of the predominantly Russian Kontinental Hockey League. In 2010, he signed with Traktor Chelyabinsk. He set a record for most goals scored by a KHL defenseman in 2010–11 and was selected to the KHL West All-Star team in the 2012–13 season.

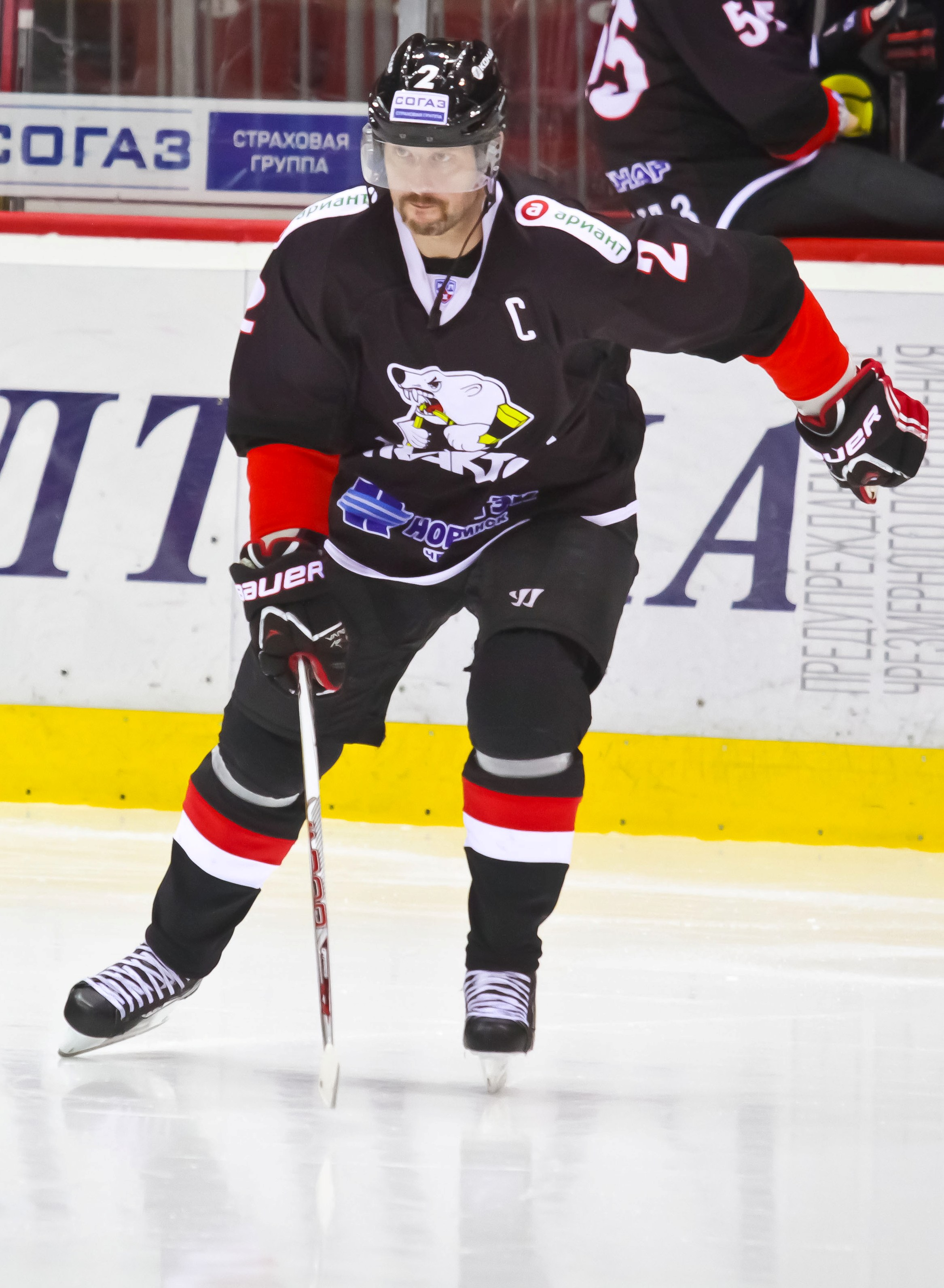

On May 1, 2013, Quint signed a two-year contract with HC Spartak Moscow. On January 15, 2014, due to Spartak's financial woes, he was traded to CSKA Moscow together with Jeff Glass for monetary compensation. On May 6, 2014, Quint opted to return to his past successes in the KHL, by signing with Traktor Chelyabinsk.

Quint would play for Traktor Chelyabinsk in 416 games (the most by any North American), and scored 189 (75 goals + 114 assists) points. He was a two-time participant in the KHL All-Star Game in 2013 and 2014, the top scorer among defenders in the league in 2011 and 2014, and winner of the League in 2012, a silver and bronze medalist in the KHL in 2012 and 2013.

During the 2015–16 season, Quint was made captain of Traktor. He made history on February 16, 2016, in the away match against Metallurg Magnitogorsk, where he earned an assist. He became the oldest hockey player in the history of Traktor Chelyabinsk to play in an official match, at 39 years old. In 52 games, Quint scored 11 points.

After leaving the KHL in the offseason, Quint opted to continue his career back in Germany, signing a one-year deal with reigning champions EHC München on June 9, 2016. He helped lead the team to a championship.

== Career statistics ==
=== Regular season and playoffs ===
			Regular season					Playoffs
Season	Team	League	GP	G	A	Pts	PIM	GP	G	A	Pts	PIM
1990–91	Cardigan Mountain School	HS-Prep	31	67	54	121	—	—	—	—	—	—
1991–92	Cardigan Mountain School	HS-Prep	21	111	58	169	—	—	—	—	—	—
1992–93	Tabor Academy	HS-Prep	28	15	26	41	30	1	0	2	2	0
1993–94	Seattle Thunderbirds	WHL	63	15	29	44	47	9	4	12	16	8
1994–95	Seattle Thunderbirds	WHL	65	29	60	89	82	3	1	2	3	6
1995–96	Springfield Falcons	AHL	11	2	3	5	4	10	2	3	5	6
1995–96	Winnipeg Jets	NHL	51	5	13	18	22	—	—	—	—	—
1995–96	Seattle Thunderbirds	WHL	—	—	—	—	—	5	4	1	5	6
1996–97	Springfield Falcons	AHL	43	6	18	24	20	12	2	7	9	4
1996–97	Phoenix Coyotes	NHL	27	3	11	14	4	7	0	2	2	0
1997–98	Springfield Falcons	AHL	8	1	7	8	10	1	0	0	0	0
1997–98	Phoenix Coyotes	NHL	32	4	7	11	16	—	—	—	—	—
1998–99	Phoenix Coyotes	NHL	60	5	8	13	20	—	—	—	—	—
1999–00	Phoenix Coyotes	NHL	50	3	7	10	22	—	—	—	—	—
1999–00	New Jersey Devils	NHL	4	1	0	1	2	—	—	—	—	—
2000–01	Syracuse Crunch	AHL	21	5	15	20	30	—	—	—	—	—
2000–01	Columbus Blue Jackets	NHL	57	7	16	23	16	—	—	—	—	—
2001–02	Columbus Blue Jackets	NHL	75	7	18	25	26	—	—	—	—	—
2002–03	Springfield Falcons	AHL	4	1	2	3	4	—	—	—	—	—
2002–03	Phoenix Coyotes	NHL	51	7	10	17	20	—	—	—	—	—
2003–04	Chicago Blackhawks	NHL	51	4	7	11	18	—	—	—	—	—
2004–05	HC Bolzano	ITA	14	5	11	16	12	9	4	5	9	12
2005–06	EHC Kloten	NLA	16	5	9	14	6	—	—	—	—	—
2005–06	Eisbären Berlin	DEL	31	5	7	12	26	11	5	6	11	6
2006–07	Eisbären Berlin	DEL	52	18	28	46	34	3	1	0	1	12
2006–07	New York Islanders	NHL	5	0	0	0	0	—	—	—	—	—
2007–08	Eisbären Berlin	DEL	56	21	30	51	28	14	6	3	9	4
2008–09	Eisbären Berlin	DEL	52	16	32	48	20	12	2	4	6	4
2009–10	Neftekhimik Nizhnekamsk	KHL	42	5	11	16	22	9	1	0	1	6
2010–11	Traktor Chelyabinsk	KHL	53	21	11	32	26	—	—	—	—	—
2011–12	Traktor Chelyabinsk	KHL	47	8	14	22	42	16	1	8	9	0
2012–13	Traktor Chelyabinsk	KHL	52	5	12	17	25	25	3	10	13	2
2013–14	Spartak Moscow	KHL	43	11	12	23	18	—	—	—	—	—
2013–14	CSKA Moscow	KHL	8	2	3	5	4	4	0	2	2	0
2014–15	Traktor Chelyabinsk	KHL	59	10	21	31	14	6	3	3	6	6
2015–16	Traktor Chelyabinsk	KHL	53	6	6	12	14	—	—	—	—	—
2016–17	EHC München	DEL	50	8	19	27	12	6	1	1	2	0
DEL totals			241	68	116	184	120	46	15	14	29	26
KHL totals			357	68	91	159	165	60	8	23	31	14
NHL totals			463	46	97	143	166	7	0	2	2	0

=== International ===
Year	Team	Event	Result	GP	G	A	Pts	PIM
1994	United States	WJC	6th	7	0	1	1	2
1995	United States	WJC	5th	7	3	3	6	6
2001	United States	WC	4th	9	0	0	0	4
Junior totals				14	3	4	7	8
Senior totals				9	0	0	0	4

== Awards and achievements ==
- 1994–95 WHL West First All-Star Team
- 2006, 2007, 2008 DEL All-Star Team
- 2008 DEL Defenseman of the Year
- (silver) 2012–13 Traktor Chelyabinsk.
- (bronze) 2011–12 Traktor Chelyabinsk.
- 2013 KHL West All-Star Team
- 2014 KHL East All-Star Team
