= Dartmouth Hall =

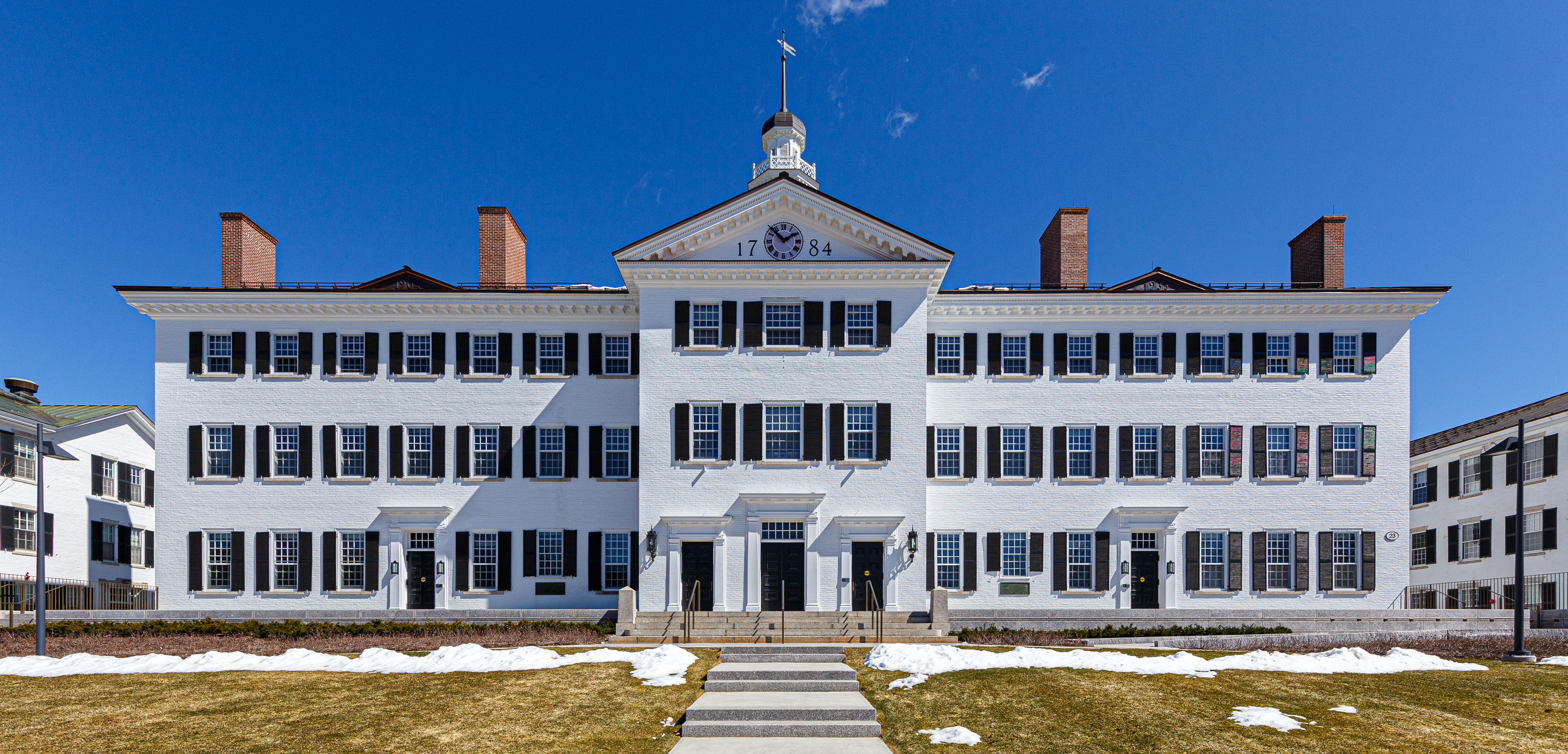
Dartmouth Hall after renovations were completed in 2022

Dartmouth Hall is the name for two buildings constructed on the same site and same stone foundation at Dartmouth College in Hanover, New Hampshire, since 1784. The current brick building was largely constructed from 1904 to 1906, and extensively renovated 2021–2022.

== History ==
Construction of the original Dartmouth Hall began in 1784. The school originally planned a brick building; pine and oak were used instead due to greater availability and lower cost. The Hall was the sole college building upon its completion in 1791, and was simply known as "the college" until at least 1828 when it was first referred to as Dartmouth Hall. The Hall survived a tornado in 1802 and fires in 1798 and 1848, which led to renovations being completed. In 1904 a fire destroyed almost the entire building. Much of the granite foundation was re-used, as were several original windows, granite steps, and metal from the damaged bell.

=== 1904–1906 rebuilding ===
Dartmouth Hall was rebuilt from 1904 to 1906 using brick instead of wood, to nearly identical dimensions as the original wooden building, making it a replica. Lord Dartmouth laid the cornerstone in 1904.

=== 2021–2022 renovation ===
From 2021 to 2022, Dartmouth Hall was fully renovated, both interior and exterior. The building was made fully accessible. Plumbing, heating, and electrical systems were updated. Classrooms were improved with new lighting (including skylights) and modern technology. Lecture room 105 was redesigned into a multifunction space for teaching, lectures and performances. There was a re-dedication ceremony on November 11, 2022, which also marked the 50th anniversary of coeducation at Dartmouth.

== Facilities ==
In 2004 the building housed the Department of French and Italian Languages and Literatures, Department of German Studies, and Department of Spanish and Portuguese Languages and Literatures. In 2022 the Leslie Center for the Humanities joined the foreign language departments.

== See also ==
- Campus of Dartmouth College
