= Cardigan Mountain School =

Private boarding school in New Hampshire, US

Coordinates: 43°40′33″N 72°02′26″W

Cardigan Mountain School of New Hampshire

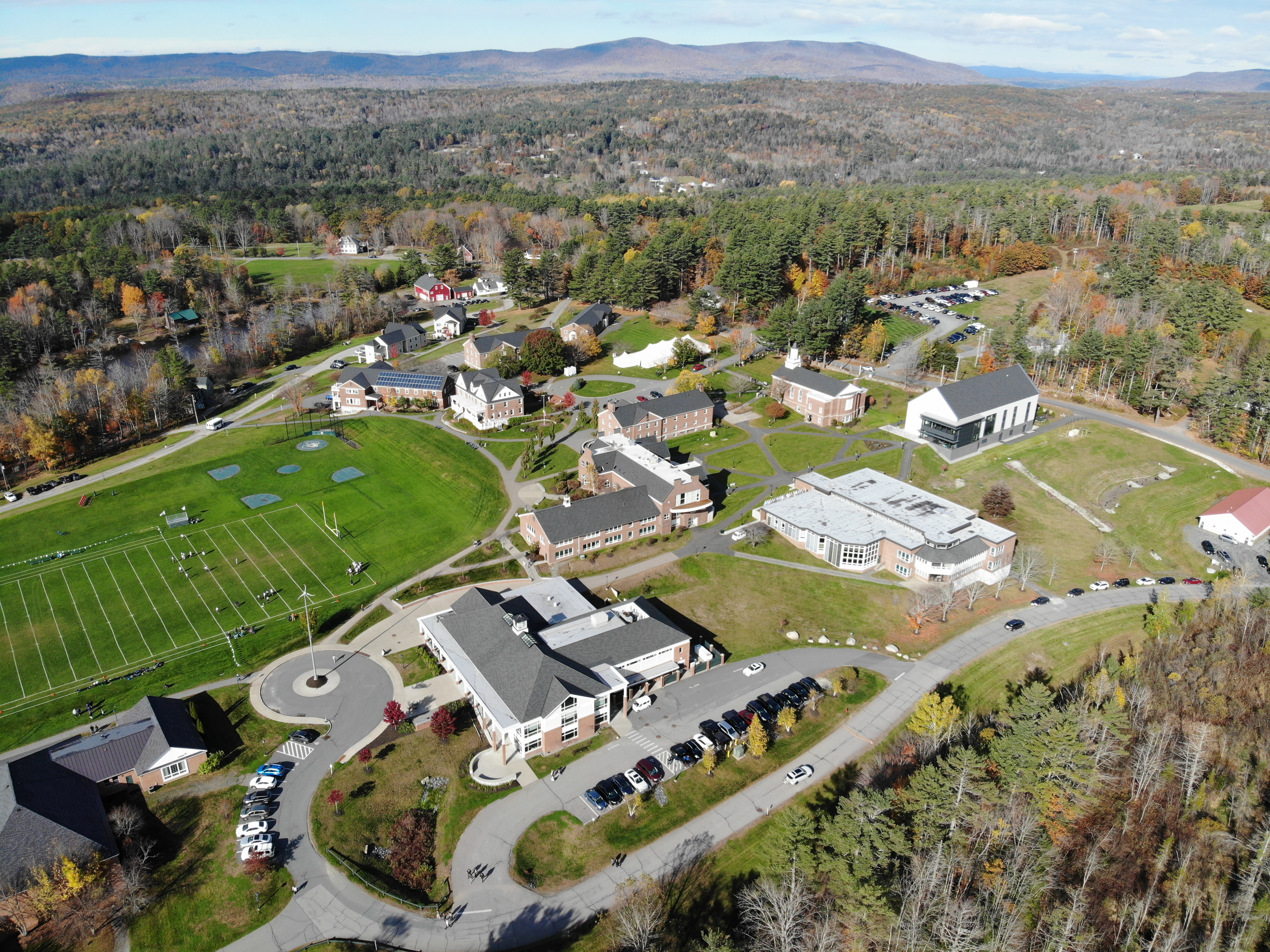
- Aerial view of Cardigan Mountain School campus

Location
- 62 Alumni Dr; Canaan, New Hampshire 03741

Information
- Type: Private boarding school
- Founded: 1945
- Headmaster: Christopher D. Day
- Faculty: 60
- Grades: 6-9
- Enrollment: 215
- Average class size: 12
- Student to teacher ratio: 4:1
- Campus size: 500 acres (200 ha)
- Campus type: Rural
- Color
- Athletics: 12 interscholastic sports 33 interscholastic teams
- Mascot: Cougar
- Rival: Eaglebrook School
- Website: www.cardigan.org

Cardigan Mountain School, also called Cardigan or CMS, for short, is an all-boys independent boarding school for grades six through nine, located on 62 Alumni Drive, Canaan, New Hampshire, United States. It was founded in 1945 on land provided by Dartmouth College.

It is a member of the National Association of Independent Schools (NAIS), the Association of Boarding Schools (TABS), the Junior Boarding Schools Association (JBSA), and the Independent Schools Association of Northern New England (ISANNE). It is accredited by the New England Association of Schools and Colleges (NEASC).

== History ==
Cardigan Mountain School was founded in 1945 by a group of men with a vision for an educational program tailored to the needs of boys in the pre-preparatory school years. The founders were prominent New England educators, businessmen, and civic leaders, including Ernest Martin Hopkins (president of Dartmouth College), William R. Brewster (headmaster of Kimball Union Academy), and Ralph Flanders (a U.S. senator from Vermont). Land for the school's campus had originally been donated to Dartmouth College by the Haffenreffer family. The founders believed the location to be ideal for a boys' school: the land and Haffenreffer mansion, which initially housed classrooms and a dormitory and is now called Clark-Morgan Hall, are situated on a peninsula in Canaan Street Lake with views of Mount Cardigan and the White Mountains to the east and the Green Mountains to the west. The school opened in 1946 with an enrollment of 24 boys, and its growth was fueled by the merger of the Clark School of Hanover, New Hampshire into Cardigan in 1953.

== Summer Session ==
Cardigan Mountain School runs its Summer Session usually beginning in June and ending in August. Summer Session, unlike the academic year program, is coeducational and serves younger students (grades three through nine) for three- and six-week experiences that include academic enrichment classes in the morning, and summer-camp style activities for the rest of the day. A highlight of the summer's activities is a competition known as "Green and White" that runs throughout the Summer Session in which students are assigned to either the Green Team or the White Team to compete in an activity selected by the faculty on a Wednesday evening. The students will wear special (green or white) T-shirts on Green and White nights. In 2011, the Cardigan Outdoor Recreation Expeditions (C.O.R.E.) program was added to its Summer Session offerings. C.O.R.E. participants experience week-long trips that may include hiking, camping, canoeing, kayaking, and outdoor education programming.

== Notable alumni ==
- Samuel S. Adams, president of the American Geological Institute, geology professor at the Colorado School of Mines, and president of Loon Mountain
- F. Lee Bailey, defense lawyer
- Mo Bamba, professional basketball player for the Utah Jazz
- Gavin Bayreuther, professional ice hockey player
- Ken Bentsen, Jr., former congressman from Texas
- Franklin S. Billings, Jr., American politician and judge from Woodstock, Vermont
- Matthew Bronfman, businessman, entrepreneur, and philanthropist
- Taylor Chace, sledge hockey player who won gold medals in the 2010 Winter Paralympics and the 2014 Winter Paralympics
- P. J. Chesson, professional auto racing driver, including the Indianapolis 500
- Philippe Cousteau Jr., environmentalist and oceanographer
- Eric Douglas, comedian and actor
- James Georgopoulos, visual artist
- Ben Lovejoy, professional ice hockey player and first New Hampshire native to win the Stanley Cup
- Freddy Meyer, professional ice hockey player
- Rob Morrow, actor (known for his role as Joel Fleischman in Northern Exposure), writer, and director
- Deron Quint, professional ice hockey player
- Jimmy Sharrow, professional ice hockey player
