= Rauner Special Collections Library =

Special collections library at Dartmouth College

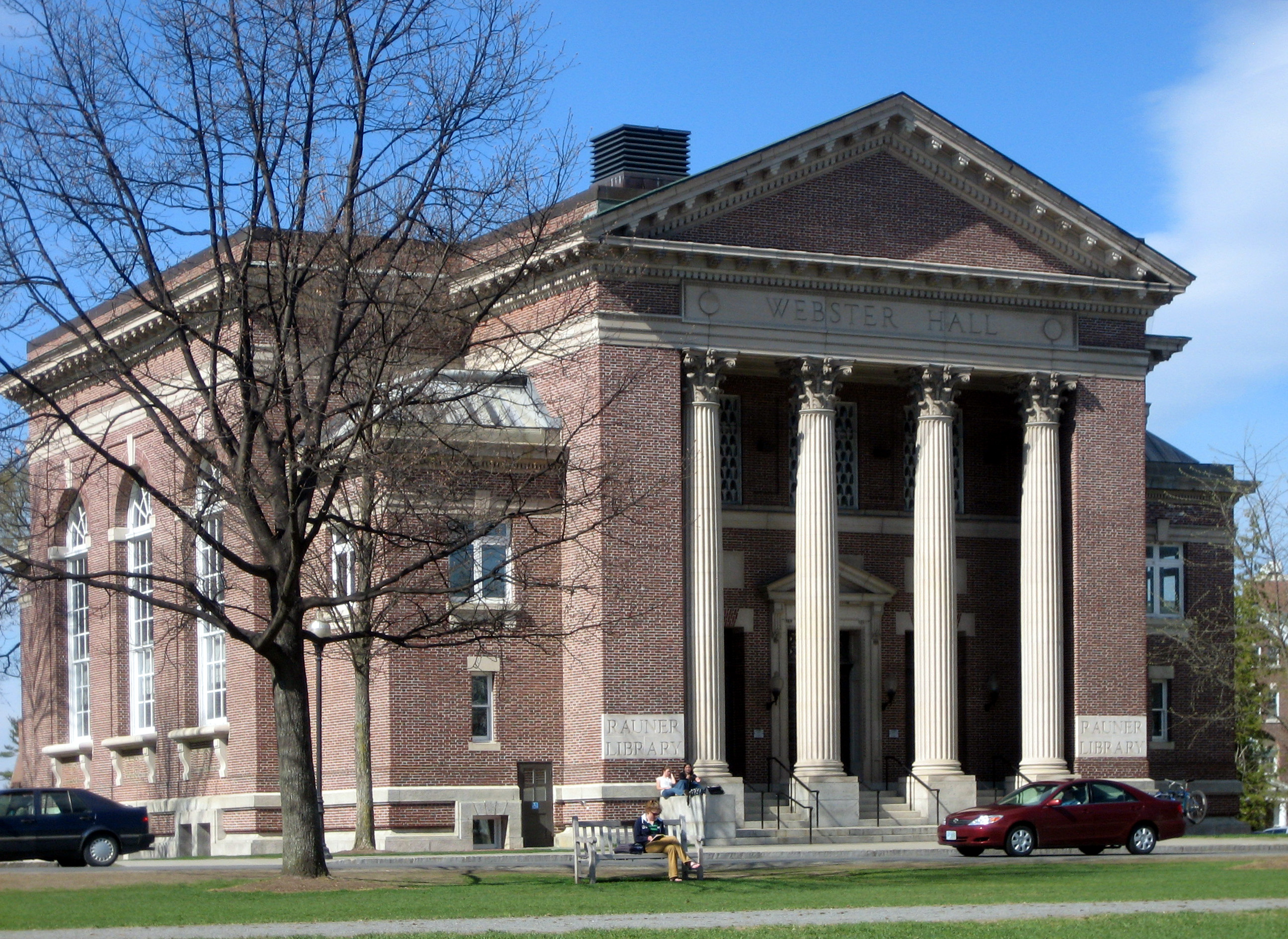
- Webster Hall, the building housing Rauner Library, pictured in 2007
- 43°42′16″N 72°17′17″W
- Location: Hanover, New Hampshire, United States
- Type: Special collections, Academic
- Established: December 15, 1998
- Architect: Charles A. Rich

Collection
- Items collected: Rare books, manuscripts, archives of Dartmouth College

Other information
- Director: Jay Satterfield
- Parent organization: Dartmouth Libraries
- Website: www.library.dartmouth.edu/rauner

The Rauner Special Collections Library, housed in Webster Hall, is the primary special collections and archival library of Dartmouth College in Hanover, New Hampshire, United States. The library holds 140,000 rare books, millions of manuscripts, and the archives of Dartmouth College. It is named for former Illinois governor Bruce Rauner and his wife Diana, who partially funded the library's construction.

The original building was designed by Charles A. Rich and named for statesman and Dartmouth alum Daniel Webster. It was constructed in 1907 and served as the college's primary campus auditorium for the first half of the 20th century, hosting commencement ceremonies, guest speakers, and musical performances. After the opening of the Hopkins Center for the Arts in 1962, the building saw less frequent use as an auditorium. Plans to renovate and convert the building into a special collections library were developed in the 1990s, with Venturi, Scott Brown and Associates serving as the lead architects. Conversion work began in 1997 after the Rauners' donation, and the library opened in 1998.

The building features a red brick facade with terracotta cornices and limestone trimmings. The entrance features a portico with limestone Corinthian columns. Inside the building is a central reading room surrounded by a mezzanine converted from the original auditorium's balcony seating. At the northern end of the reading room is a four-story glass enclosure storing many of the library's rare books, and underneath the building is a series of underground stacks. The library has 30,000 feet (9,100 m) of stacks in total.

== History ==
=== Planning and construction of Webster Hall ===
In 1893, Dartmouth president William Jewett Tucker developed an initiative for the expansion of Dartmouth's campus. Architect Charles A. Rich, himself a Dartmouth alum, presented the first master plan for the expansion shortly after Tucker's inauguration in February 1893. Although no records of this original plan have survived, it was described as featuring "efficiency, beauty and an almost hygienic separation of uses into distinct buildings."

On June 8, 1894, the Trustees of Dartmouth College approved the construction of part of Rich's plans, which included a plan to construct a quadrangle north of the Dartmouth Green. The location was chosen at the advice of landscape architect Charles Eliot, who argued that the alternative area for expansion, to the east of the Green along College Park, would have been costly due to the need for grading and would have damaged the campus' natural beauty. At the time, the chosen location was occupied by residential properties. The college began purchasing the properties to make way for the development, and a new area for residential development was made available along Occom Ridge to the north to compensate.

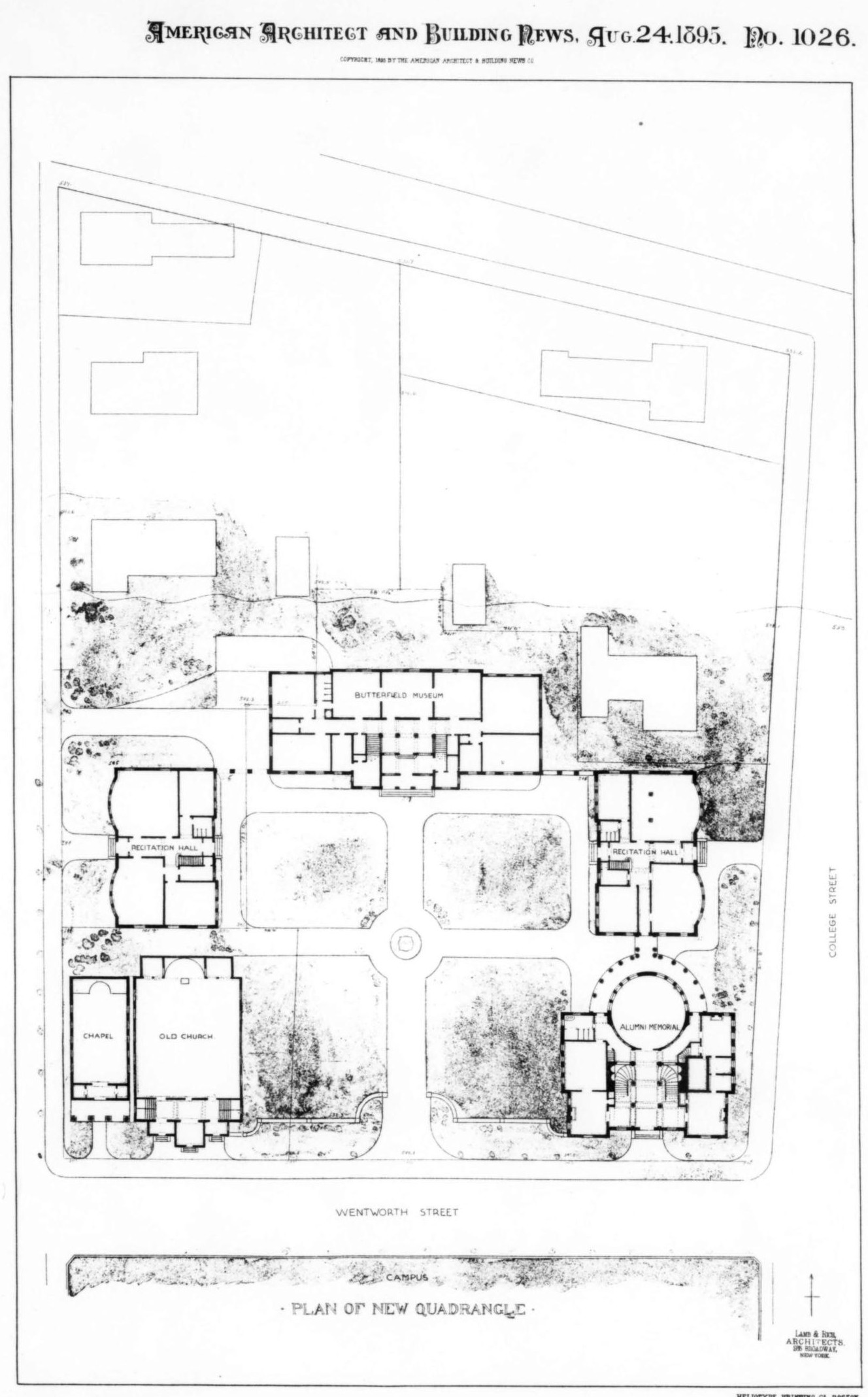
Illustration of the 1895 design for the new quadrangle

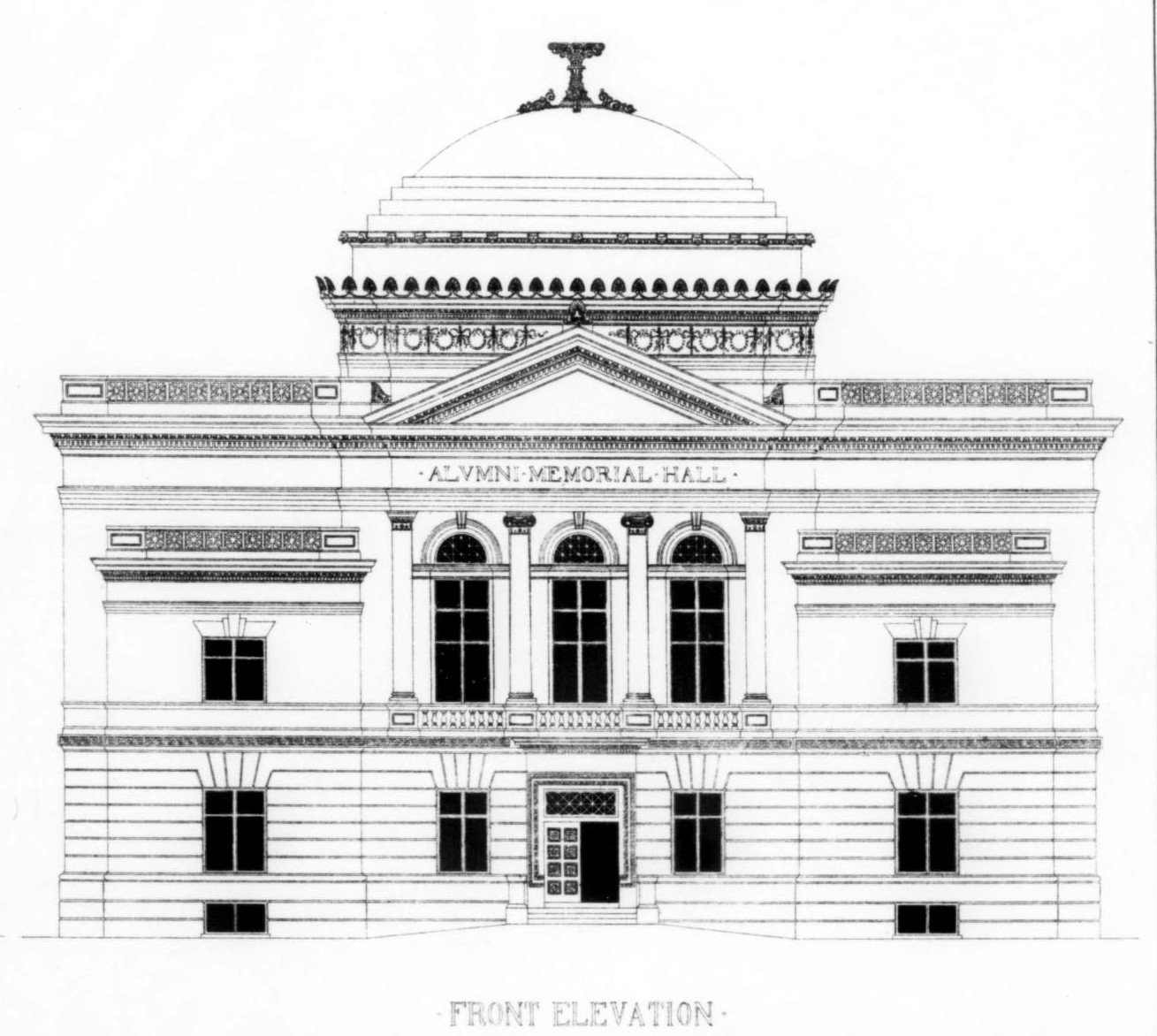
The original 1895 design for the Alumni Memorial Hall

Rich published the design for the quadrangle in August 1895. The plan included the first design for what would become Webster Hall at the corner of Wentworth and College Streets. The original design was to serve as a memorial hall for alumni and featured an ornate dome. President Tucker had sent out a brochure to alumni requesting donations to fund the memorial hall. The quadrangle scheme was later reworked, however, and the Trustees approved a new design for the memorial hall, again published by Rich, in May 1901.

The building broke ground as Webster Hall, named after Daniel Webster, in September 1901, during a series of special events celebrating the centennial of Webster's graduation from the college. As described by Frank Sherman Streeter, then the chair of the Trustees' building committee, the building was planned to house administrative offices as well as a hall preserving "all that will keep fresh in the general mind the romantic beginnings of the College, her splendid history, and the fine achievements of her more illustrious sons in the work of the world." However, work on Webster Hall was suspended in 1904 after a fire destroyed Dartmouth Hall, leading all available funds to be redirected to its reconstruction, and Webster Hall's construction did not resume until Dartmouth alum Stephen Crosby donated $50,000 to its completion. The project's total cost was later capped at $116,000 (equivalent to $4.01 million in 2025), with a $5,000 appropriation added in 1907 for seating. The building's bronze doors were also donated in 1907 by alum John Weyman Jones as a memorial to the class of 1841.

=== Operations as Webster Hall ===
==== Early use as campus auditorium ====
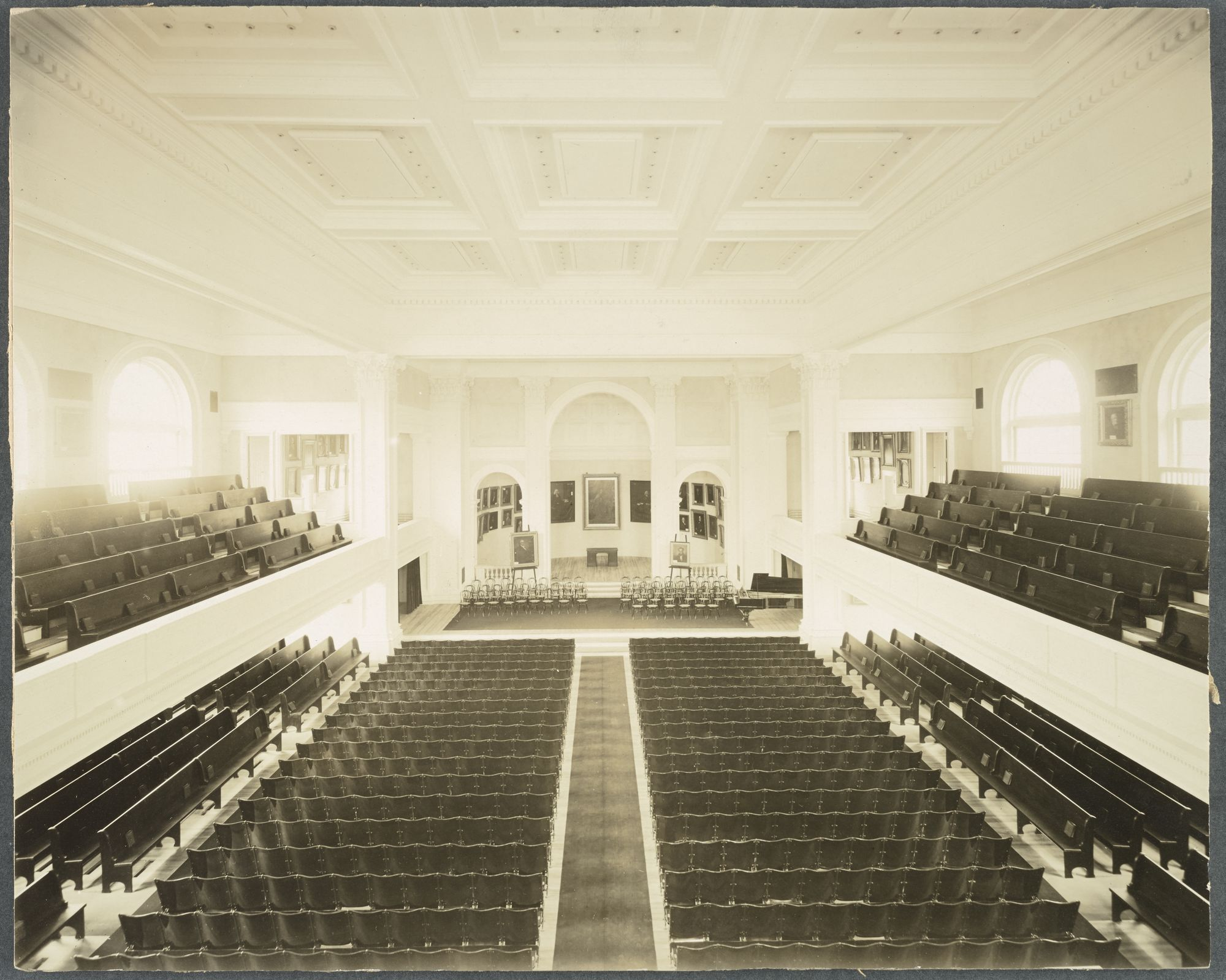
Interior of Webster Hall at opening in 1907

Webster Hall hosted the opening of Dartmouth's 139th academic year on September 26, 1907. The building had its formal opening ceremony on October 18, 1907, during which President Tucker gave the opening address and dedication in the building's auditorium to an audience of 1,700, including students and alumni. At opening, the auditorium was decorated with portraits of significant Dartmouth alums and tablets displaying artifacts significant to Dartmouth's history, and the hall's apse displayed a mahogany desk once owned by Daniel Webster.

Webster Hall went on to host the college's commencement ceremonies from 1908 to 1931. Due to New Hampshire's first-in-the-nation presidential primary, the hall also held debates among presidential candidates. Other notable speakers and performers include lawyer and orator William Jennings Bryan, who gave an anti-evolutionist address at the hall in December 1923, pianist and composer George Gershwin, who performed there in January 1926 alongside Paul Whiteman's Orchestra, and poet Robert Frost, who gave a series of lectures and poetry readings at Webster Hall during the 1930s and 1940s. The hall was also the site of a significant student protest when Alabama governor George Wallace gave a speech there on May 3, 1967. Wallace spoke to a full audience of 1,400 in the hall in addition to 1,000 bystanders listening from outside the hall. During his speech, members of Dartmouth's Students for a Democratic Society and Afro-American Society began booing and shouting over Wallace before staging a walkout. Shortly after, students listening from outside the hall broke past police barriers and stormed the center aisle. As Wallace was rushed out of the hall, students gathered around his car, pounding it and throwing rocks at it.

Even as it continued to host events for much of the 20th century, demand increased by the late 1930s for a larger auditorium to replace Webster Hall. In December 1938, the President and Trustees proposed a new auditorium to be built once the necessary funds were available. However, in 1939, The Dartmouth reported that these plans would potentially be delayed as a result of World War II. A new stage was installed in the building in 1941, and, after the Nugget Theater in Hanover burned down in 1944, the hall was renovated to be able to serve as a screening venue for use by the Theater. A projection booth was installed in addition to concrete exit stairs on the east and west sides of the building. The Nugget's films continued to be screened in Webster Hall until 1951, when the theater moved back into a location in downtown Hanover.

==== Decline and alternative uses ====
Webster Hall experienced less use as a performance hall after the opening of the Hopkins Center for the Arts in 1962. The facade was crumbling by 1970 and was repaired that year, with temporary staging being used to prevent debris from falling on passersby. That same year, The Dartmouth characterized the building as a "white elephant". In 1976, the Facilities Planning Board authorized a study on potential uses for the building, including one option to convert it to a student center. College President John G. Kemeny stated at the time that "having [Webster Hall] used only ten times a year as an auditorium is a waste of one of the most central buildings on campus." A committee was then established in 1978 to study potential uses for the building. Suggestions included converting it into classrooms or lecture halls. The Dartmouth Alumni Magazine noted, however, that, because the building was designed as an auditorium, heating, egress, and the addition of floors could serve as challenges for a conversion. By 1980, a renovation plan originally proposed in 1962 was further delayed, and another plan to convert the building to a social sciences center was abandoned in favor of the construction of the Rockefeller Center.

Webster Hall assumed several other uses while the College worked on a permanent plan for the building. At one point the hall was used for art storage. By 1977, the hall was being used for dance classes, but students and faculty noted problems with the building, including poor lighting and heating, as well as splinters caused by the stage floor. By 1988, it was being used as a temporary student center.

=== Library conversion ===
==== Special Collections before Rauner ====
As early as the 1960s, Dartmouth began exploring the addition of new library spaces. In 1964, the Trustees Planning Committee tasked the Libraries Studies Council with creating a report on potential library expansions, which was released on May 1, 1966. The report recommended using an available space in the "library quadrangle"—the block bounded by Main, Elm, College, and Wentworth Streets—for a library expansion. The report also noted the potential future need for a separate building in the library quadrangle to house special collections. Webster Hall was not explicitly mentioned in the report, however. Chief of Special Collections Walter Wright furthermore proposed in 1969 that the college find a new space for a special collections library.

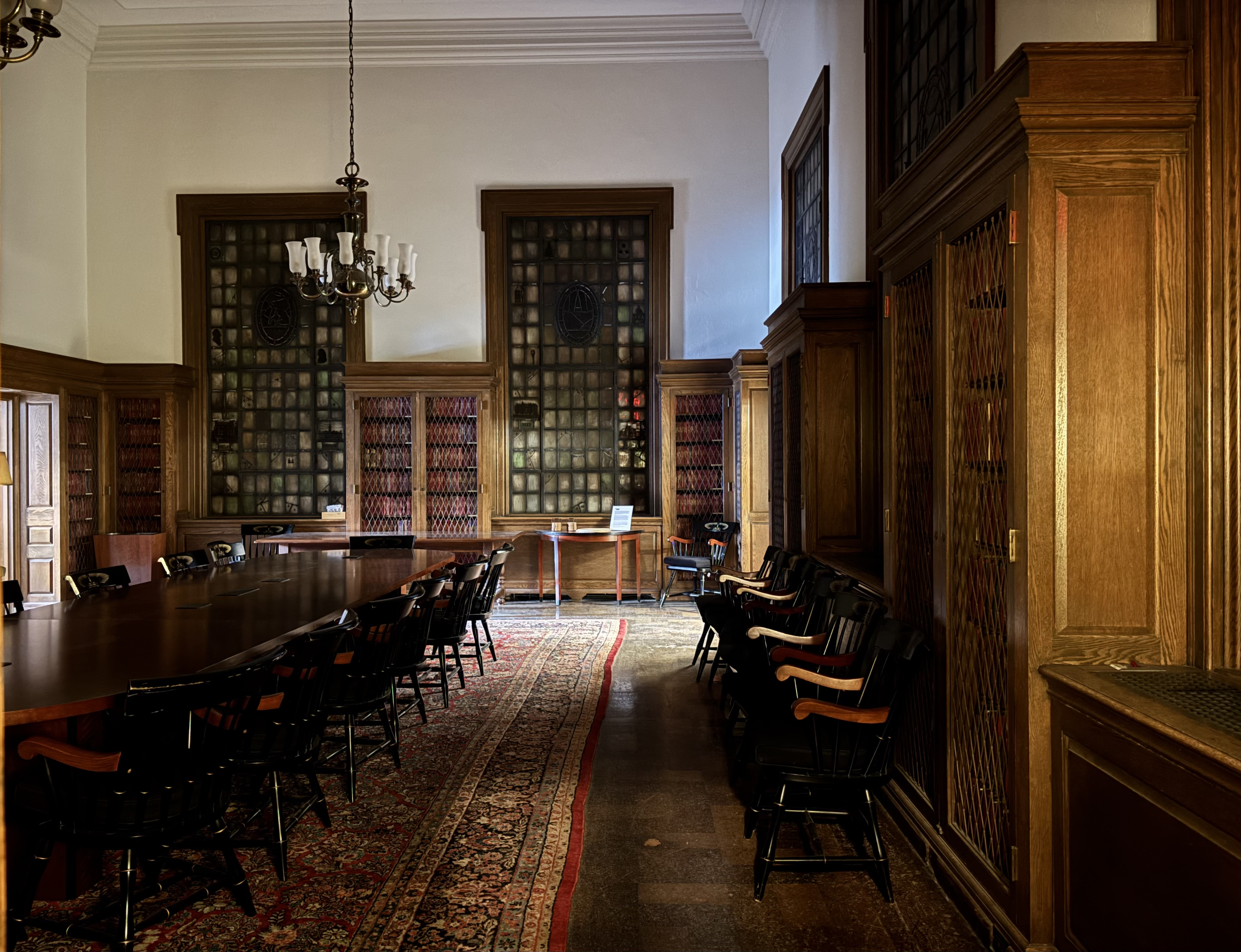
The Treasure Room pictured in 2026

Dartmouth's special collections had been housed in the northwest corner of Baker Library for several decades prior to Webster Hall's conversion. The college originally had separate units for the Rare Book collection, the college archives, manuscripts, and the Stefansson Collection on Polar Exploration, but these collections were combined into one special collections unit in the late 1960s. The special collections reading room and public services were located on the building's first floor in what was known as the "Treasure Room", while staff offices and stacks were located in various places on all four floors of the building. The Treasure Room was dedicated in 1929 as a memorial to Charles Merrill Hough, a member of the Class of 1879, and the words "Hough's Room" are written on the room's door in brass lettering. The room features stained glass windows with imagery memorializing the college's history. In 1984, the special collections were renovated with climate control and improved security systems and received additional stack space. However, the department was still dealing with "critical space issues," and by 1998 the collections serviced by the Treasure Room had grown more than a hundred times larger than they were at the time of the room's opening.

==== Conversion planning and construction ====
In 1989, the Trustees authorized a study on renovating Webster Hall into a special collections library. The study was completed in spring of 1990 by architectural firm Venturi, Scott Brown and Associates, providing cost estimates and design proposals for the project. The design continued to be refined, with a revised report being released by Venturi in cooperation with Shepley Bulfinch in 1992, and a completed version was released in 1993 with a projected cost of $10 million (equivalent to $22.3 million in 2025). It included plans for a climate-controlled, glass-enclosed structure within the building to house the library's most valuable items. Construction was put on hold until funds were raised for the project.

By January 1996, however, construction remained on hold despite initial plans for construction to begin in 1994, as Dartmouth still needed another $5 million for the renovation. Meanwhile, construction of the Berry Library, an extension of Baker Library, was set to begin in 1998, and the Webster Hall conversion needed to secure funding by late 1996 so that Baker's special collections could be moved to Webster Hall before Baker's renovation began. Dartmouth alum Bruce Rauner and his wife Diana donated the $5 million that same year, allowing construction to begin. The new library was thus named after them.

The college hired Jackson Construction Company as the project construction manager, and work began in June 1997 with completion planned for fall of 1998. By July 1997, most of the building's interior had been gutted with the exception of some decorative plaster and a staircase. The plans for the renovation included limited exterior alterations, most notably the addition of a ground-level handicap-accessible entrance to the west of the building's main steps. The large exterior windows were also planned to be reglazed with ultraviolet-shielding glass to protect valuable materials from harmful light exposure. Interior modifications included the construction of the aforementioned glass curtainwall box, as well as the addition of extensive underground stacks stretching from the existing Baker Library to beneath Webster Hall's apse. To build the below-grade stacks, a large pit was excavated between Webster Hall and Baker Library during construction. Among other interior changes, the raked balcony floors and projection booth were removed, and the balconies were converted to study spaces. A fiber optic lighting system was installed in place of the original incandescent lights, and interior plaster details were also restored.

The renovation was met with opposition from some student groups. Webster Hall was the college's last medium-sized venue readily available for use by student groups. By the time the conversion began, the hall had still been used to host various student events including shows, concerts, and dance classes. Much of this programming had to be cut or scaled back as a result of Webster Hall's conversion. In winter 1995, the Student Assembly organized a rally to petition the college to build a new venue to replace Webster Hall. However, the college's Facilities Working Group had not come up with a plan for the venue's replacement when the conversion began.

As construction began on the new library, the special collections department began planning the process for moving its items from Baker to Rauner. The department hired National Library Relocations, Inc. for professional moving services. The library also conducted a complete inventory of its special collections in fall of 1997 to determine their status before the move. The library then appointed a team to create a blueprint documenting the specific locations of the items in the collection as well as where in Rauner they would be moved to. After an internal discussion, the department decided to fully close during the moving process due to concerns about security difficulties and quality of service if the library were to remain open during the move. The library closed on September 30, 1998, three weeks before moving began, in order to allow staff to prepare for the move. It was intended to reopen at the new location on December 1.

=== Operations as Rauner Library ===
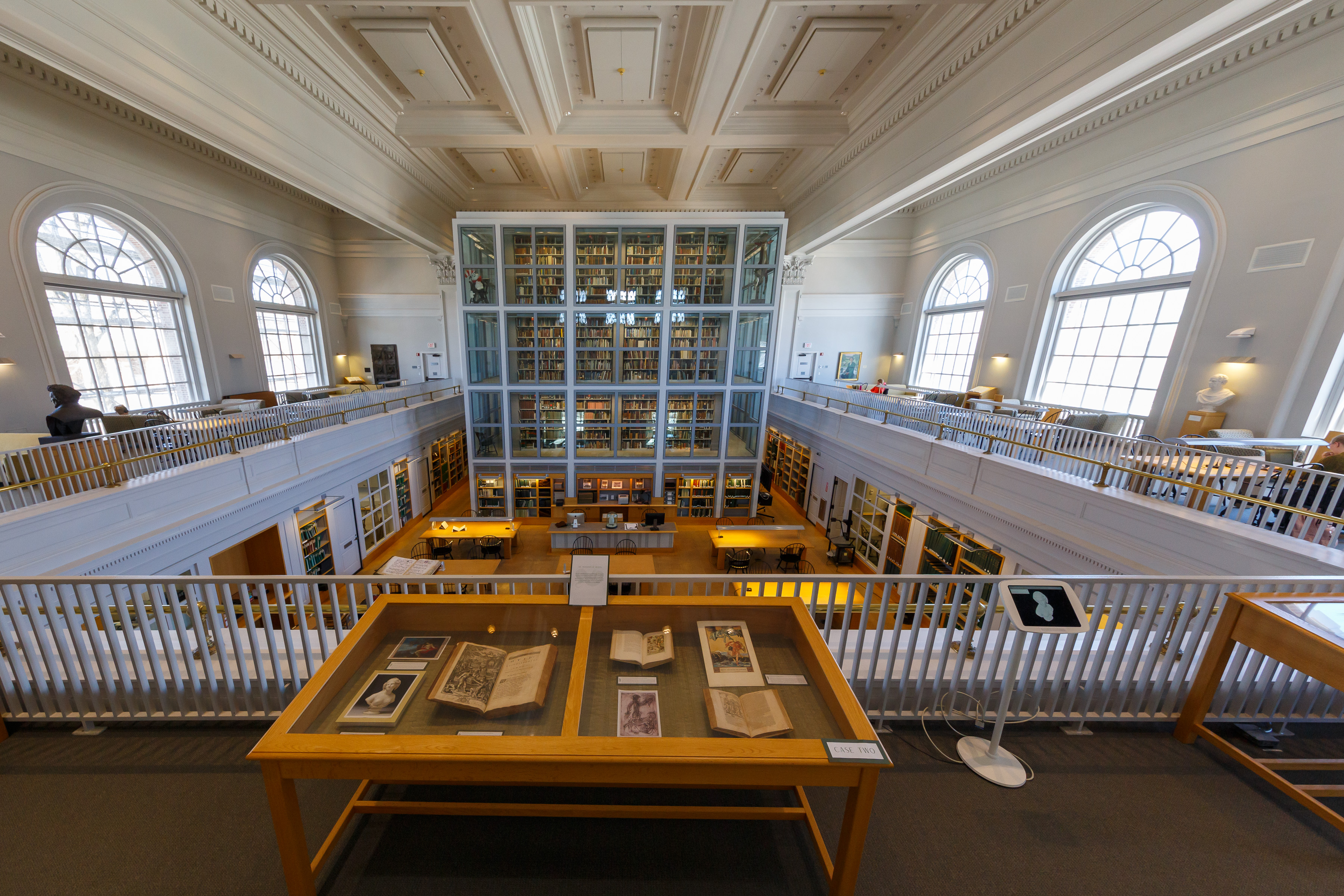
Interior of Rauner Library

Rauner Library opened on December 15, 1998, two weeks later than planned. The collections had been moved in on time, but construction needs led to the delayed opening, with some construction work continuing even as the library opened. The library had its formal dedication ceremony in April 1999. It received an Illumination Design Award from the Illuminating Engineering Society of North America in 2000 and a National Honor Award from the American Institute of Architects in 2002.

Rauner Library began digitizing part of its collections in 2007. At the time, the college was working with a digitization company based in Chester, Vermont to scan all 12 million pages of the United States Congressional Serial Set. The college was also digitizing the Encyclopedia Arctica. Using grant funding from the National Endowment for the Humanities, college faculty began digitizing the library's collection of papers relating to Mohegan clergyman and Dartmouth co-founder Samson Occom in 2011.

The building underwent a series of renovations from 2023 to 2024. As part of a campus-wide initiative to improve energy efficiency, the building's steam heater fueled by oil was replaced with a heat-recovery chiller in early 2023. The switch was projected to reduce the building's steam consumption by 82%. Work also began in the summer of 2023 on a $6.5 million renovation of the building's exterior, which included a restoration of the building's roof, copper details, cornices, and corbels. Damage to the building's exterior details had posed a safety hazard and was exacerbated by more frequent freeze-thaw cycles resulting from climate change. As a result, the cornices and corbels were given more secure, water-resistant attachments to the building. The project was completed in December 2024.

== Design ==
Webster Hall, the original structure, was designed by New York architect Charles A. Rich. The 1998 library conversion was designed by Venturi, Scott Brown and Associates, with Jackson Construction Company serving as the general contractor, Keast & Hood Co. serving as the structural engineer, and T&M Associates serving as the civil engineer. The building is located on the corner of Wentworth and College streets to the southeast of Baker-Berry Library.

=== Exterior ===
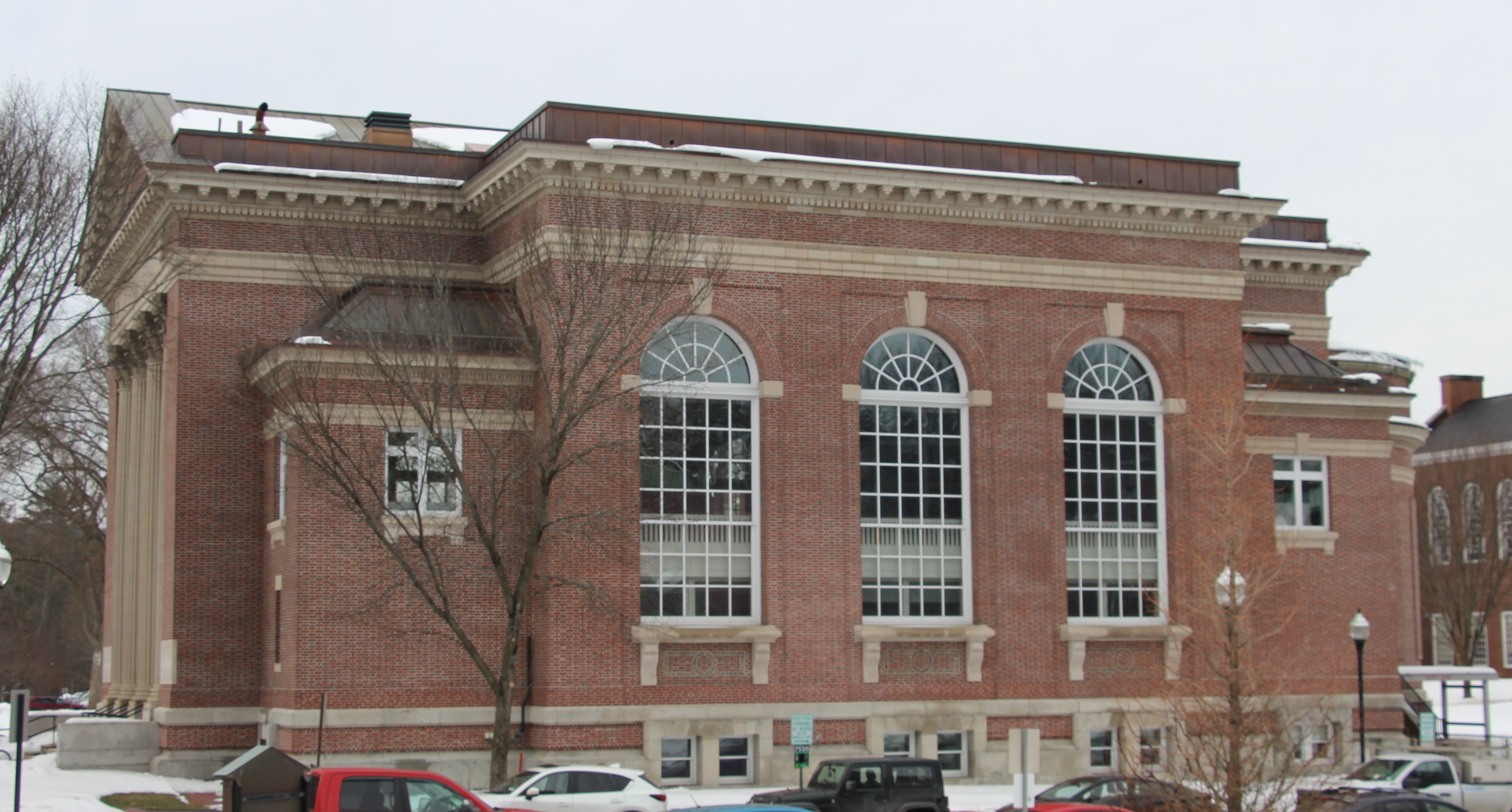
Rauner Library viewed from the east

Rauner Library measures 128 feet (39 m) on its north-south axis, including the semi-circular apse at the northern end of the building, and 90 ft (27 m) on its east-west axis. It has a steel superstructure supported by a foundation made of pink granite sourced from Lebanon, New Hampshire. The structure's facade features red brick laid in Flemish bond with black header bricks. The building has a copper roof and terracotta cornices, with limestone used for other trimmings. Its entrance at the southern elevation features a tetrastyle portico with four Corinthian columns made of Indiana limestone. The entrance also features large bronze doors inscribed with the names of Dartmouth's Class of 1841. To the west of the main steps is a ground-floor, handicap-accessible entrance added during the 1998 renovation.

=== Interior ===
Rauner Library has a floor area of 37,000 square feet (3,400 m^{2}), and its floor plan follows the Greek cross layout.

==== Ground floor and mezzanine ====
Past the entrance, the building's foyer preserves most of the details from its original construction, among them a marble floor and white enameled wainscoting. On the west end of the foyer is an elevator providing access to all levels of the building and to the handicap-accessible entrance. The foyer also features a plaque memorializing the 83 Dartmouth graduates who died in the Civil War. The foyer leads into the main hall, which serves as the library's reading room. The reading room has a seating capacity of 36 and has shelves containing reference materials. The room is framed by four corinthian pilasters and is surrounded by the library's mezzanine above, which was converted from the auditorium's balcony seating. The mezzanine features reading and study areas on its east and west flanks and is home to the Class of 1965 Galleries, which display rotating exhibits curated from the library's collections.

Underneath the balconies is a series of acoustically isolated rooms, including two seminar rooms available for use by classes, a quiet study room, and a study aids room containing equipment for close examination of materials. The remaining public room on the ground floor is the Ticknor Room, containing a historic fireplace, furniture, and books originally owned by academician and Dartmouth alum George Ticknor. These possessions were originally part of Ticknor's personal library and were donated to the college in 1943. They were then installed in a room in Baker Library before being reinstalled in Rauner during the 1998 conversion.

Other interior details include motorized window shades and coffered plaster ceiling panels. The building also has a fiber optic lighting system installed during the conversion, which includes downlights built into the ceiling coffers.

==== Stacks and basement ====
Rauner Library contains 30,000 feet (9,100 m) of bookstacks, which are located both within Webster Hall itself as well as below ground and, with the exception of the reference stacks in the reading room, are closed to public access. At the northern end of the reading room is a four-story, climate-controlled glass curtainwall enclosure storing many of the library's rare books. The enclosure's stacks extend northward into the hall's apse. The library also has a series of underground stacks extending from Webster Hall's apse to the southeast wing of Baker Library. These stacks link to Baker's map room, facilitating the transportation of materials between the two buildings, and they use mobile shelving for increased storage capacity.

Underneath the reading room, the library's basement stores mechanical equipment including four large air-handling units that help maintain the specific temperature and humidity levels needed for the library's collections. The basement also has staff offices and workspaces, a darkroom, and a conservation workshop.

== Collections ==
Rauner Library's collections in total contain 140,000 rare books, 500,000 photographs, and 6.5 million manuscripts.

=== College archives ===
The library is home to Dartmouth College's archives, which were originally established in 1928 and include records of The Dartmouth, minutes from the meetings of the Board of Trustees and other organizations, various correspondence, and photographs from the College photographer, among other items. More recently, the archives have also been used as a repository for other permanent records stored for administrative and fiscal purposes. Photographic archives range from the 1850s to the present day and include photos of campus events such as Winter Carnival and Green Key, academic events, buildings on campus and in the town of Hanover, and individuals associated with the college, among other subjects. Other notable items include a piece of the original Lone Pine. The majority of the archives are stored in the library's underground stacks.

=== Other collections ===
In addition to the college's archives, Rauner houses extensive collections of rare books, manuscripts, photographs, and other media. The library has several collections related to individuals associated with the college. The Robert Frost collection contains 1,500 items related to American poet Robert Frost, including 44 of Frost's 48 surviving manuscript notebooks, drafts of poems and plays, various correspondence and legal documents, and Frost's personal suitcase. The original collection was acquired by the college after Frost's death in 1963. The Theodor S. Geisel collection contains watercolors, sketches, manuscripts, correspondence, and other media belonging to Theodor Seuss Geisel, popularly known as Dr. Seuss. The library also housed a collection of materials relating to Mohegan clergyman Samson Occom, who funded the college's founding. The collection included letters, diaries, and sermons. The library digitized the collection before repatriating Occom's materials to the Mohegan Tribe in 2022.

In addition to personal materials, the library also houses the Stefansson Collection on Polar Exploration, which was originally developed by Arctic explorer Vilhjalmur Stefansson as his personal library and contains expedition records, diaries, and biographies relating to the polar region, as well as over 1,200 photographs, most of which were taken during Stefansson's Canadian Arctic Expedition from 1913 to 1918. The collection was purchased by the college in 1952.

Other notable items in the library's collections include a first edition copy of the Book of Mormon, a copy of Shakespeare's First Folio, Babylonian clay tablets dating to 2350 B.C., a leaf of the Gutenberg Bible, and a collection of various papers by George Washington, including journal entries and a letter written to the college's Board of Trustees in 1789.
