= Dartmouth Ski Team =

College Ski Team

The Dartmouth College Ski Team was once organized under the aegis of the Dartmouth Outing Club and is now operating under Dartmouth Athletics. This team is notable for both providing students access to competitive skiing and training internationally successful nordic and alpine ski racers. The Dartmouth Outing Club hosted the US's first downhill ski race on Mt Moosilauke in 1927, and Dartmouth skiing has been intertwined with ski racing ever since.

The alpine teams train at the Dartmouth Skiway in Lyme, New Hampshire. The nordic teams train at The Dartmouth Cross Country Ski Center at Oak Hill, Hanover NH.

Cami Thompson is the Director of Skiing at Dartmouth and has been a Dartmouth coach since 1989; she was a US Ski Team member from 1985-1987, and is a member of the US Ski & Snowboard Board of Directors.

== History ==
Dartmouth College student Fred Harris (1888-1961) founded the Dartmouth Outing Club in 1909, and so became "the man who put America on skis"

The Nashua (NH) Telegraph notes that in 1914, a group of Dartmouth students travelled to Canada to compete against McGill University in the first collegiate ski race. The Dartmouth Outing Club's 1927 race on Mt Moosilauke is cited by the US Ski & Snowboard Association as the first downhill ski race in the country.

By 1935 the ski team was sufficiently distinct from the Outing Club to have its own distinct captain; the first ″ski team″ captain was Selden Hannah D35, though there were ″winter sports″ captains before that.

The Dartmouth Ski Team won the NCAA national championship in 1958, 1976 (tied with Colorado), and 2007. The team finished in second place in 1955, 1956, 1964, 1969, and 1970. The team has finished in the top 5 of the NCAA Skiing Championship 44 times.

The Dartmouth Ski Team hosted the 2025 NCAA national championship in March 2025 at The Dartmouth Skiway (alpine events) and Oak Hill (nordic events). Twelve Dartmouth athletes were selected by the NCAA to participate in the championship, and the team finished third. On March 6, John Steel Hagenbuch D25 won the Men’s 7.5 km Individual Classical event after finishing second in the Men’s 20 km Individual Freestyle event. Other notable finishers included Jasmine Drolet D25, who placed 3rd in the Women’s 7.5 km Individual Classical event, and Benny Brown D27, who finished second in the Giant Slalom.

== Captains ==
The list of captains of the ski teams can be found here.

Year	Men's Alpine	Men's Nordic	Women's Nordic	Women's Alpine
2024	Preston O’Brien D24	Cam Wolfe D23, Luke Allan D25	Emma Reeder D25	Olivia Holm D25
2023	Olof Hegelian D24	Luc Golin D22, Cam Wolfe D23	Garvey Tobin D24	Bri Trudeau D23, Gwen Wattenmaler D23
2022	Henrik Thorsby D22	Luc Golin D22	Callie Young D22	Ellie Curtis D22
2021	Pete Fucigna D21	Walker Bean D21	Sofia Shomento D21, Maddie Donovan D21	Mikaela O’Brien D21
2020	Drew Duffy D21		Leah Brams D20, Lauren Jortberg D20	Claire Thomas D21
2019	James Ferri D19	Gavin McEwen D19, Koby Gordon D19	Emily Hyde D19	Alexa Dlouhy D19
2018	Thomas Woolson D17	Luke Brown D18	Zoe Snow D18	Foreste Peterson D18
2017	Thomas Woolson D17	Fabian Stocek D17	Cara Piske D18, Zoe Snow D18	Nicole Anderson D17
2016	Sam Macomber D16	Oscar Friedman D16	Mary O'Connell D16, Corey Stock D16	Anne Strong D16
2015	Ben Morse D14, Hunter Black D15	Austin Caldwell D15, Silas Talbot D15	Julia Harrison D15	Abby Fucigna D15
2014	Ben Morse D14, Mathieu Bertrand D14	David Sinclair D14	Annie Hart D14, Isabel Caldwell D14	Abby Fucigna D15

== Winter Olympic and Paralympic Games ==
Dartmouth skiers have represented the US (and other nations) in the winter Olympic and Paralympic Games.

Location	Year	Dartmouth Athletes	Competitors with Class Year and Event	Medals
Chamonix	1924	1	John B. Carleton D22 (Nordic Combined)	
St Moritz	1928	1	Charles N. Proctor D28 (Special Jump)	
Lake Placid	1932		No skiers, however Jack Shea D34 (Speed Skating)	
Garmish	1936	4	A. Lincoln Washburn D35 (Alpine Slalom), Warren H. Chivers D38 (Nordic Combined), Edgar H. Hunter Jr D38 (Alternate), Richard H. Durrance D39 (Alpine Combined)	
Cancelled	1940	9	Athletes named but did not compete due to World War II: Selden J. Hannah D35 (Nordic Combined), David J. Bradley D38 (Nordic Combined), Stephen J. Bradley D39 (Nordic Combined), Warren H. Chivers D38 (Nordic Combined), Richard H. Durrance D39 (Alpine Combined), John P. Litchfield D39 (Nordic Jumping), Edward P. Wells D39 (Alpine), Harold Q. Hillman D40 (Alpine)	
Cancelled	1944		Athletes not named	
St Moritz	1948	1	Colin C. Stewart IV D48 (Alpine Slalom)	
Oslo	1952	4	John H. Caldwell Jr D50 (Nordic Combined), Brooks Dodge Jr D51 (Alpine Giant Slalom), William L. Beck D53 (Alpine Downhill), Chiharu Igaya D57 (Alpine)	
Cortina	1956	6	Brooks Dodge Jr D51 (Alpine), Charles N. Tremblay D52 (Nordic Combined), William L. Beck D53 (Alpine Downhill), Thomas A. Corcoran D54 (Alpine), Chiharu Igaya D57 (Alpine), Ralph E. Miller Jr D55 (Alpine)	
Squaw Valley	1960	3	Thomas A. Corcoran D54 (Alpine), Chiharu Igaya D57 (Alpine), Richard W. Taylor D59 (XC)	
Innsbruck	1964	2	Richard W. Taylor D59 (XC), James W. Page D63 (Nordic Combined)	
Grenoble	1968	2	Edward G. Williams D64 (Biathlon), Edward F. Gillette D67 (XC)	
Sapporo	1972	5	Scott W. Berry D71 (Jumping), Walker T. Weed III D71 (Nordic Combined), David H. Currier D74 (Alpine), Thomas A. Reaper D74 (XC Jumping), Timothy J. Caldwell D76 (XC)	
Innsbruck	1976	5	David H. Currier D74 (Alpine), Donald M. Nielsen D74 (XC), Douglas J. Peterson D75 (XC), Timothy J. Caldwell D76 (XC)	
Lake Placid	1980	4	Donald M. Nielsen D74 (XC), Douglas J. Peterson D75 (XC), Timothy J. Caldwell D76 (XC), Walter A. Malmquist II D78 (XC)	
Sarajevo	1984	7	Donald M. Nielsen D74 (XC), Timothy J. Caldwell D76 (XC), William K. Carow D80 (Biathlon), Landis A. Arnold D82 (Jumping), Glen R. Eberle D85 (Biathlon), Dennis McGrane D84 (Jumping), Gale H. Shaw III D85 (Alpine)	
Calgary	1988	7	William K. Carow D80 (Biathlon), Dennis McGrane D84 (Jumping), Gale H. Shaw III D85 (Alpine), Leslie Thompson D86 (XC), William H. Hudson D88 (Alpine), Martha Hill D82 (Alpine), Diana Golden D84 (Alpine)	
Albertville	1992	9	Susan Forbes D83 (XC), Erich Wilbrecht D84 (Biathlon), Leslie Thompson D86 (XC), Elizabeth McIntyre D87 (Alpine Freestyle), William Gaylord D90 (Alpine), Ian Harvey D90 (Biathlon), Nina Kemppel D92 (XC), Michael Terrell D93 (Alpine), Christopher Puckett D94 (Alpine)	
Lillehammer	1994	8	Leslie Thompson D86 (XC), Elizabeth McIntyre D87 (Alpine Freestyle), William Gaylord D90 (Alpine), Ian Harvey D90 (Biathlon), Nina Kemppel D92 (XC), Suzanne King D86 (XC), Conner O'Brien TU87 (Alpine), Carl Swenson D92 (XC)	Silver (McIntyre)
Nagano	1998	3	Nina Kemppel D92 (XC), Suzanne King D86 (XC), Stacey Wolley D92 (Biathlon)	
Salt Lake City	2002	5	Nina Kemppel D92 (XC), Carl Swenson D92 (XC), Barb Jones D99 (XC), Scott McCartney D01 (Alpine), Bradley Wall D02 (Alpine)	
Turin	2006	7	Carl Swenson D92 (XC), Scott McCartney D01 (Alpine), Bradley Wall D02 (Alpine), Patrick Biggs D06 (Alpine), Libby Ludlow D06 (Alpine), Carolyn Treaty D06 (Biathlon), Sarah Konrad D89 (Biathlon)	
Vancouver	2010	7	Tucker Murphy D04 (XC), Sara Studebaker D07 (Biathlon), Ben Koons D09 (XC), Andrew Weidrecht D09 (Alpine), Laura Spector D10 (Biathlon), Tommy Ford D12 (Alpine), Nolan Kasper D14 (Alpine)	Gold (Kearney), Bronze (Weibrecht)
Sochi	2014	12	Tucker Murphy D04 (XC), Sara Studebaker D07 (Biathlon), Andrew Weibrecht D09 (Alpine), David Chodounsky D08 (Alpine), Susan Dunklee D08 (Biathlon), Hannah Dreissigacker D09 (XC Biathlon), Ida Sargent D11 (XC), Sophie Caldwell D12 (XC), Nolan Kasper D14 (Alpine), Staci Mannella D11 (Alpine), Trace Cummings Smith D15 (Alpine), Hannah Kearney D15 (Alpine Freestyle)	Silver (Weibrecht), Bronze (Kearney)
Pyeongchang	2018	15	Tommy Ford D12 (Alpine), Tucker Murphy D04 (XC), Andrew Weibrecht D09 (Alpine), David Chodounsky D08 (Alpine), Susan Dunklee D08 (Biathlon), Hannah Dreissigacker D09 (Biathlon), Ida Sargent D11 (XC), Sophie Caldwell D12 (XC), Nolan Kasper D14 (Alpine), Staci Mannella D11 (Alpine), Annie Hart D14 (XC), Patrick Caldwell D17 (XC), Tricia Mangan D19 (Alpine), Alice Merryweather D21 (Alpine), Rosie Brennan D11 (XC)	
Beijing	2022	7	Susan Dunklee D08 (Biathlon), Rosie Brennan D11 (XC), Tommy Ford D12 (Alpine), Julia Kern D19 (XC), Tricia Mangan D19 (Alpine), AJ Hurt D23 (Alpine), Nina O'Brien D20 (Alpine)	
Cortina	2026	12	Julia Kern D19 (XC), Rosie Brennan D11 (XC), Lauren Jortberg D20 (XC), Mary Bocock D27 (Alpine), Jasmine Drolet D25 (Nordic, Canadian Olympic team), John Steel Hagenbuch D25 (XC), AJ Hurt D23 (Alpine), Nina O'Brien D20 (Alpine), Sam Morse D20 (Alpine), Kyle Negomir D23 (Alpine), AJ Ginnis D19 (Alpine, Greek Olympic team), Tanguy Nef D20 (Alpine, Swiss Olympic team)	

== World Cup ==
The highest level of competitive ski racing takes place on the Alpine and Nordic World Cup circuits.

== Moosilauke Time Trial ==
Two times each year, the alpine and nordic ski teams complete a time trial, starting at the Moosilauke Ravine Lodge and ending at the summit of Mt Moosilauke.

The course follows the Gorge Brook Trail, and ascends 2387 feet (to 4802 feet ASL) across 3.6 miles. The course record of 36:16 was set in 2010 by Kris Freeman.

== Dartmouth Ski Team alumni notable for accomplishments other than Olympic Skiing ==
- Katie Bono D10. Holder of women’s record for fastest ascent of Denali in Alaska, with a time of 21:06, set in 2017.
- Bill Briggs D54. Pioneer of big mountain skiing, inducted into the U.S. National Ski and Snowboard Hall of Fame in 2008.
- Howard Chivers D39. Inducted into the US Ski and Snowboard Hall of Fame in 1973. 1942 National Nordic Combined Champion. Former captain of the Dartmouth Ski Team. Brother of Warren Chivers.
- Tom Corcoran D54. In addition to his Olympic performance and national championships, Corcoran founded Waterville Valley ski area in New Hampshire. According to his entry in the National Ski Hall of Fame, "Tom Corcoran was elected to the U.S. National Ski Hall of Fame on 1978 as both a Skisport Builder and Ski Athlete. He received the Blegen Award in 1991, the highest award of the U.S. Ski Association. In 1995, he was elected to the Rolex International Ski Racing Hall of Fame."
- Peter Dodge D78. Dartmouth men's alpine coach. 1989-2022 Dodge raced on the US Pro Tour in the 1980s and was twice awarded skier of the year honors. He is credited as instrumental in the increased relevance of collegiate skiing to the highest levels of the sport.
- Jack Durrance D36. Brother of ski team member Richard H. Durrance D39, attempted to climb K2 in 1939. He completed the first recorded traverse of the Grand, Middle and South Tetons in Wyoming (with Butterworth). He completed the first recorded ascent of the Grand Teton via the northwest ridge (with M. Davis). In 1936, he completed the first ascent of the north face of the Grand Teton (with Petzoldt and Petzoldt).
- Ned Gillette D67. In addition to attending the 1968 Winter Olympics, Gillette wrote a book on cross-country ski technique Cross-Country Skiing, first published in 1979. In 1981, Gillette climbed and descended by skiing the Pamir peak Mustag Ata (24,757 feet). Gillette was an adventurer, notably rowing 600 miles across the Drake Passage between South America and Antarctica. He was killed in Kashmir in 1998 while traveling with Susan Patterson, his spouse.
- Fred H. Harris D1911. Founded the Dartmouth Outing Club; inducted into the US National Ski Hall of Fame in 1957.
- John McCrillis D1919. Early advocate for alpine (vs nordic) ski racing. Inducted into the US National Ski Hall of Fame in 1966.
- Malcolm McLane D46. World War II fighter pilot, POW, Distinguished Flying Cross recipient. Rhodes Scholar, captain of the Dartmouth ski team, director of the US Olympic Committee. McLane was elected to the U.S. National Ski Hall of Fame in 1973.
- Walter Prager Coach; elected to the U.S. National Ski Hall of Fame in 1977.
- Gale Shaw III (Tiger) D85. CEO of US Ski & Snowboard Association.
- Jeff Shiffrin D76. Father of Mikaela Shiffrin.
- Sandy Treat D46. 10th Mountain Division soldier during World War II. Inducted into the Colorado Snow Sports Hall of Fame in 2010.

== See also ==
Dartmouth Outing Club alumni not associated with the ski team have made notable contributions to mountaineering. For example, in 1963, Barry Bishop D53, Barry Corbet D58, Jake Breitenbach D57, Barry Prather D61, and Dave Dingman D58 all joined the first US expedition to Mt Everest.

Margaret Wheeler D97 was president of the American Mountain Guides Association.
