= The Dartmouth =

Student newspaper at Dartmouth College

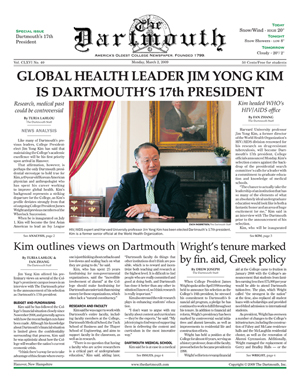
- The Dartmouth print edition on March 2, 2009
- Type: Student newspaper
- Format: Broadsheet
- School: Dartmouth College
- Owner(s): The Dartmouth, Inc.
- Founder: Moses Davis
- Publisher: Vihan Jayawardhane
- Editor-in-chief: Annabelle Zhang
- Founded: August 27, 1799; 226 years ago
- Headquarters: Robinson Hall, Hanover, New Hampshire, United States
- ISSN: 0199-9931
- Website: thedartmouth.com

The Dartmouth is the daily student newspaper at Dartmouth College and America's oldest college newspaper. Originally named the Dartmouth Gazette, the first issue was published on August 27, 1799, under the motto "Here range the world—explore the dense and rare; and view all nature in your elbow chair."

First published by Moses Davis, the newspaper is now published by The Dartmouth, Inc., an independent, nonprofit corporation chartered in the state of New Hampshire. Many alumni of The Dartmouth have gone on to careers in journalism, and several have won Pulitzer Prizes.

== About The Dartmouth ==
The newspaper, commonly known as The D, is the campus's only daily newspaper and is free for students. The Dartmouth publishes Monday through Friday from September to June, except during federal holidays and College vacations. During summer months, the paper publishes on Fridays. During the fall, winter and spring terms, The Dartmouth's editorial board publishes a house editorial, the "Verbum Ultimum", in the Friday edition of the paper. The editorial board is composed of the editor-in-chief, executive editors and opinion editors. The offices of The Dartmouth are located on the second floor of Robinson Hall, where over 200 student staff members contribute to the paper weekly either through the editorial or business staffs. The Dartmouth hires new staff at the start of every term.

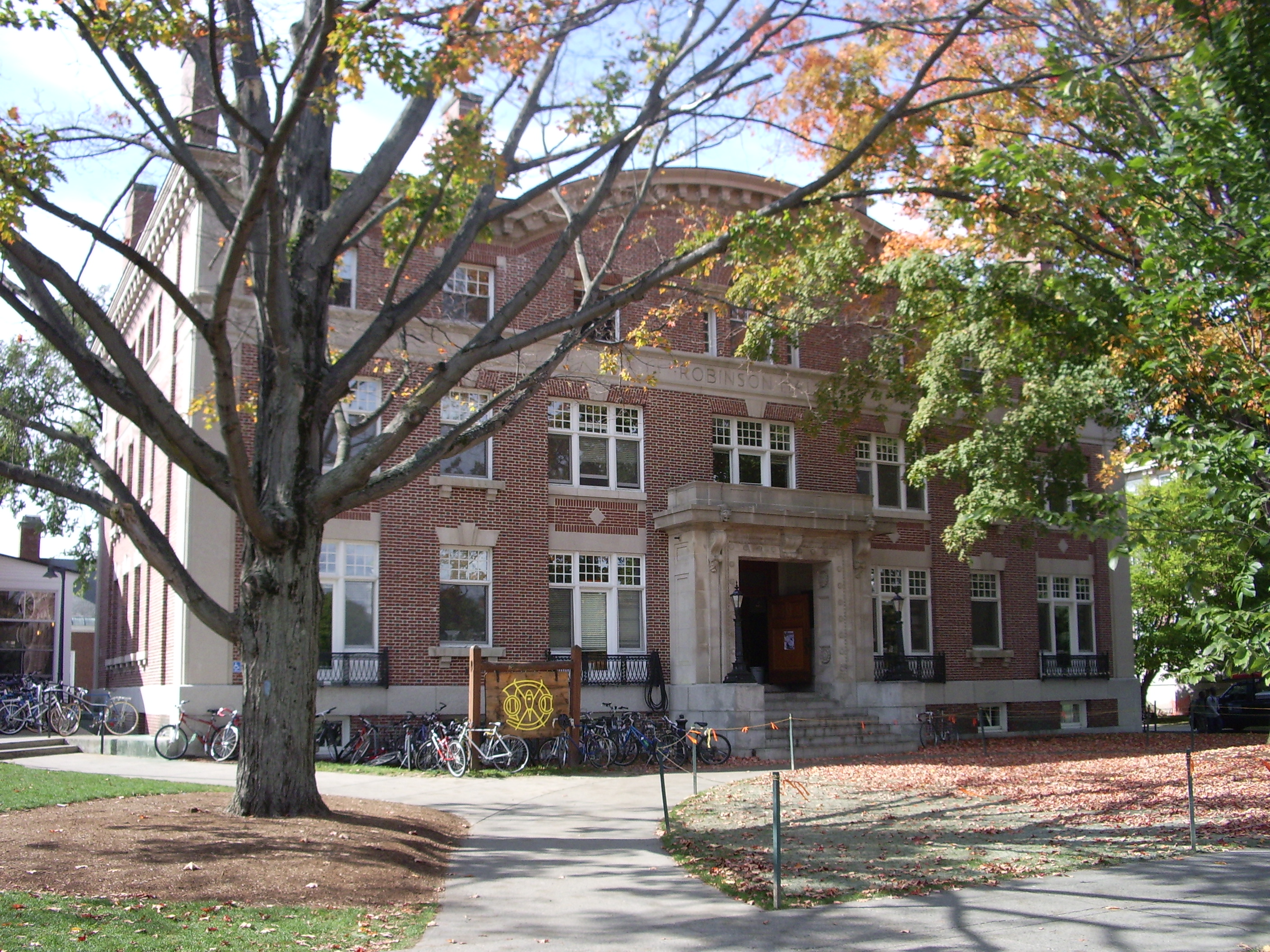
The Dartmouth leases its office suites on the second floor of Robinson Hall.

The Dartmouth is run entirely by undergraduate students, with the publisher serving as the head of the business side and the editor-in-chief serving as the head of the editorial section of the paper. Members of The Dartmouth's senior directorate serve year-long terms and each directorate selects the next year's leaders. Both business and editorial directorates transition to new leadership between the winter and spring terms.

On the editorial side, applicants can apply to write for any of the various content sections, which include news, opinion, arts, media, sports, and news magazine "The Mirror". They can also to work on the photography, graphics, design or copyediting staff. Students are asked to submit an application before interviewing with current staff. On the business side, students can apply for the advertising, strategy, communications and marketing, or product development sections. Applicants are asked to submit an application before interviewing with current staff.

The Dartmouth publishes two weekly supplements, "Big Green Sports Weekly" on Mondays and "The Dartmouth Mirror" on Wednesdays.

Special editions are printed for such events as Homecoming weekend, Winter Carnival, Green Key Weekend and Commencement, and a special freshman issue is sent to the homes of all incoming students the summer before matriculation.

During the New Hampshire primary, The Dartmouth is known for its interviews with the presidential candidates.

The Dartmouth maintains its own photo and poster store with pictures in current editions as well as copies of historical front pages, available for purchase.

== History ==
=== Early years ===
The Dartmouth was first published in Hanover, New Hampshire, on August 27, 1799, by Moses Davis "on College Plain" under the name the Dartmouth Gazette. "Here range the world – explore the dense and rare; And view all nature in your elbow chair," Davis wrote in the first issue of the Dartmouth Gazette. In his first column, Davis stressed the necessity of avoiding "personal reflections" while maintaining "impartiality in view".

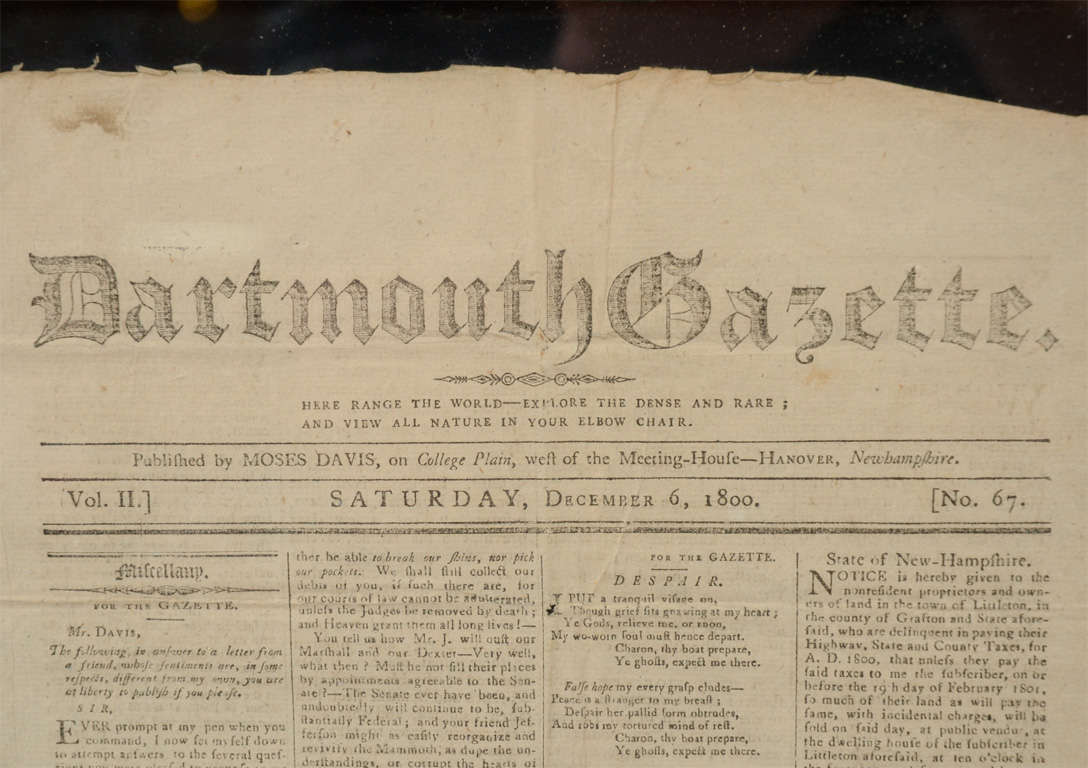
One of the first issues of the Dartmouth Gazette

The first issue contained a request for subscribers throughout the local area to follow the news provided by the Dartmouth Gazette. The newspaper started with revenue from its subscribers. Davis wrote, "The Dartmouth Gazette shall be printed on paper of the present size and quality. The price will be One Dollar and fifty cents per ann. delivered at the Printing-Office. To give the paper a start, 25 cents is required on receipt of the 1st No. and 50 cents, if offered, will not be refused." The size of the first issue measures roughly 10 by 16 inches (250 by 410 mm). A copied image of the first issue hangs framed in the office suites of The Dartmouth.

The first articles of the Dartmouth Gazette focused on local news, but also printed two pages of foreign and national news. The Gazette's aim was to print news articles that were of practical use to readers, often covering information about local events, laws that would affect local residents, and imminently dangerous sicknesses. The first issue of the Dartmouth Gazette contains a poem and short story signed by "Icarus", who was later found to be Daniel Webster. Issues of the Dartmouth Gazette demonstrate that the newspaper provided a record of local events relating both to the town and to the college. For example, "the second issue has a long and rather tediously written discussion of New Hampshire school laws, and a report of Dartmouth's Commencement activities from Wednesday, August 28, 1799." It is also clear that mischief consistent with undergraduate students was not eliminated from the Dartmouth Gazette entirely by the editing process.

=== Becoming The Dartmouth ===
The Dartmouth Gazette changed its name to The Dartmouth Daily and then The Dartmouth as the newspaper was published more regularly. It also started to create a greater emphasis on news of Dartmouth College, rather than news of a national import.

The name of the newspaper was changed "to be a faithful expression of the mind of the students, — to be, what its title imports, The Dartmouth, possessing such a local character and stamp of individuality as will render it acceptable to all who claim this Institution as their Alma Mater." This changing focus on local and College news contrasts with the greater national and local focus of the newspaper in the first decades of the 1800s. Financially, The Dartmouth was self-sustaining through a subscription revenue model.

The Dartmouth's printing press changed several times during the 19th century. In 1840, the editors noted, "We hope our convenience, which demanded a change of printers, will not compel us to do it at the expense of our typography." The April 1840 issue of The Dartmouth stated bluntly, "[T]his month has not been prolific in College news." In this context, The Dartmouth's original local and national news focus becomes clear.

The Dartmouth printed many editorials in its pages, which "tackled a variety of topics, mostly of an academic nature. The Dartmouth also contained a College News section with one or two-line items on professorial appointments, alumni news, and an editors note regarding correspondence."

By 1842, The Dartmouth regularly ran to 40 pages and was printed eight times a year. Under the principle of "write for your readers," the writing in The Dartmouth was "to be geared to the popular reader instead of the academic."

Christopher R. Johnson '94 completed a detailed thesis history of The Dartmouth, after receiving a grant from the Hewlett Foundation for The Dartmouth's Historical Archives Project. According to Johnson, "From the editors' note at the end of each issue comes something as typically mock vainglorious as this segment: '...[A]s a consequence, The Dartmouth is making an illumination. Be careful you are not dazzled by its luminous pages.'"

The Dartmouth went through a substantial developmental phase in 1875 under the watchful eye of Samuel Merrill of the Class of 1876. Starting in September 1875, The Dartmouth began publishing regularly every Thursday morning. Merrill doubled the size of the newspaper and increased subscription terms to $2 a year. Also in 1875, advertisements appeared in The Dartmouth for the first time. At this time, The Dartmouth was the only college paper published weekly in New England, and was one of the three largest college weeklies in the world.

== Incorporation ==
The newspaper's organization prior to 1913 was a simple business partnership between the Publisher and Editor-in-Chief. The masthead section would state that the newspaper was published by the Publisher and Editor-in-Chief, using the last names of these two students. As such, The Dartmouth was financially independent from the college. Although this system worked, it was recognized that some formal organization would be needed, making the newspaper an independent corporate organization that would be able to withstand an assault by the college.

On September 18, 1913, a news story announced that The Dartmouth had become a corporation chartered in Maine over the summer break. "Instead of a mere union of editors putting forth a newspaper by common consent, there is a legal corporation for the purpose, a legal entity which exists in the eyes of the law apart from the particular individuals who form its personnel at a given time. The paper has changed from individualistic to corporate control," the issue read.

The newspaper's board of management (currently called the Directorate, the group of editors and business directors) spent many hours preparing and executing the incorporation of the paper. The newspaper was chartered in Maine because the college could have a powerful hold on New Hampshire politicians if necessary, since it was a major employer and influence in the state. By incorporating the newspaper in Maine, the newspaper could escape some of the college's political power in case of a lawsuit.

In 1939, the college's political influence was no longer deemed problematic, and The Dartmouth, Inc. was transferred from Maine to New Hampshire.

== Vox Clamantis Fund ==
The Dartmouth maintains the Vox Clamantis Fund, created in 1999 to help enable reporters, editors, directors and staff to supplement their "on-the-job" training by meeting and working with journalists and business journalism professionals. The fund consists mostly of donations alumni and community members make through The Dartmouth's webpage. Since its founding it has donated nearly $140,000.

In the past, the fund has awarded leave-term stipends for unpaid internships at news organizations including Hearst Newspapers, The New York Times, CongressNow, Condé Nast and The Atlantic Monthly, providing stipend recipients with front-row access to the world of journalism.

The Vox Fund has also allowed The Dartmouth to bring renowned journalists to Hanover to work alongside staff through the Editor-in-Residence program. Former Editors-in-Residence include long-time Philadelphia Inquirer reporter George Anastasia '69, former correspondent for NBC News Robert Hager '60, and New York Times reporter Jacques Steinberg '88.

The fund also sponsors reunions for alumni of The Dartmouth during each of the college's "big weekends". These events bring together staffers from throughout The Dartmouth's history, and allow staffers a chance to meet some of their predecessors.

== Notable alumni ==
=== Journalism ===
- Geeta Anand, Pulitzer Prize-winning journalist and author
- George Anastasia, journalist and author focusing on organized crime
- Anne Bagamery, International Herald Tribune senior editor
- David Boldt, Pulitzer Prize-winning journalist and former editor of The Philadelphia Inquirer
- Tim Burger, journalist
- Thomas Braden, journalist and author of Eight is Enough
- Francis Brown, former editor of The New York Times Book Review
- Vincent Canby, former chief film critic for The New York Times
- Susan Dentzer, editor-in-chief of Health Affairs
- Dan Fagin, Pulitzer Prize winning environmental journalist and New York University journalism professor
- Thomas Gerber, former editor of The Concord Monitor
- Paul Gigot, Pulitzer Prize-winning conservative political commentator and editor of The Wall Street Journal's editorial pages
- Jamie Heller, reporter and editor for The Wall Street Journal
- David Herszenhorn, reporter for The Washington Post
- Ralph Nading Hill, writer and preservationist
- Richard Hovey, author of Dartmouth College's "Alma Mater"
- Jim Newton, journalist and author
- Mort Kondracke, political commentator and journalist
- Eric Konigsberg, author, journalist and writer for The New Yorker
- Bill Leonard, television executive and former president of CBS News
- Peter Prichard, journalist, former editor-in-chief of USA Today and current chairman of the Newseum
- David Rosenbaum, journalist for The New York Times
- David Scherman, photojournalist and editor
- David Shipler, journalist and Pulitzer Prize-winning author of Arab and Jew: Wounded Spirits in a Promised Land
- Jacques Steinberg, reporter for The New York Times
- Jake Tapper, journalist and current CNN anchor
- Howard Weinberg, documentary filmmaker, television journalist and professor at Columbia University Graduate School of Journalism
- Christopher Wren, former foreign correspondent for The New York Times and editor at Newsweek and the International Herald Tribune
- Felicia Schwartz, Diplomatic correspondent at Politico and former reporter for The Wall Street Journal and Financial Times

=== Other media ===
- Keith Boykin, broadcaster, commentator and author
- Connie Britton, actress
- Mindy Kaling, actress, comedian, writer and producer of NBC's The Office
- Budd Schulberg, Academy Award-winning screenwriter, television producer, novelist and sports writer

=== Business ===
- Jeff Blatt, former CEO of the Synapse Group, Inc.
