= Dartmouth College Marching Band =

Marching band

Dartmouth College Marching Band DCMB
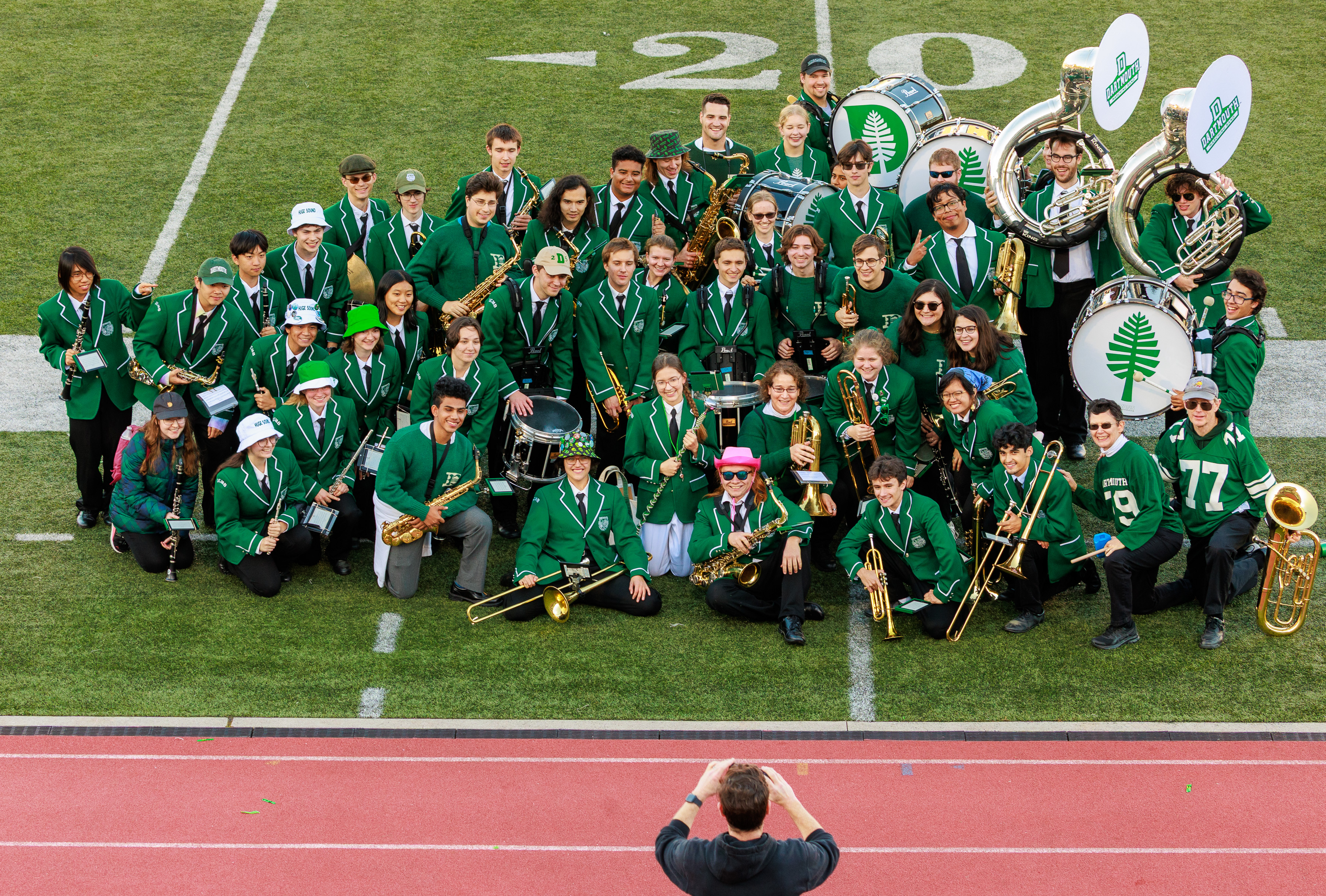
- 2025 DCMB poses for a photo
- School: Dartmouth College
- Location: Hanover, New Hampshire
- Conference: Ivy League
- Founded: 1889
- Members: about 60
- Fight song: ""Dartmouth's in Town Again," "Come Stand Up Men," "As the Backs Go Tearing By," and "Glory to Dartmouth""
- Website: Dartmouth College Marching Band

The Dartmouth College Marching Band (abbr. DCMB) is an organization of Dartmouth College. There are a little under 60 members.

== About the DCMB ==
The Dartmouth College Marching Band was formed during the 1889 football season, making it the oldest in the Ivy League. Since the 1960s, the DCMB has been a "scatter band" like every Ivy League marching band except Cornell's band.

During the fall, the band attends all home football games and one away game. For the pre-game and halftime of each game, the band writes a script, intended to be humorous, which is read over the loudspeaker as the band scrambles into a formation which relates to the jokes in the script. During the football game, the band plays during offensive first downs, defensive third downs, and after any points are scored, and supplies various chants and songs.

Once football season is over, the DCMB remains active by acting as a pep band at hockey and basketball games, as well as by playing at various special events on campus such as Winter Carnival. The band also performs "Bandygrams" for Valentine's Day, allowing other students to request romantic songs be played at their friends, lovers, or enemies around campus.

Historically, the band included a kazoo section as well as a "liquid percussion" section, in which kegs and jugs were used as percussion instruments.

While the band does have official faculty representatives, the organization is primarily student-run. The "Big 4" of the band consist of the President, Vice President, Drum Major, and Assistant Drum Major. In addition, other members of the "Directorate" deal with equipment management, show writing, publicity, social life, supplying music, maintaining lists, and other various necessary tasks. Positions are filled by election at the end of Fall term, with the exception of the Drum Major. Drum Major auditions are held winter term, and are used to select an assistant Drum Major who will aid the current Drum Major and prepare to take over the following winter. By DCMB tradition, the Governor of Hawaii is an ex officio member of directorate, and supreme authority rests with the Coke Machine. The coke machine in Morton Hall was elected to the directorate in November 1988 when Tor Blaisdell ran for president unopposed. Mr. Blaisdell was elected as president, while the Coke Machine became a member of the DCMB directorate.

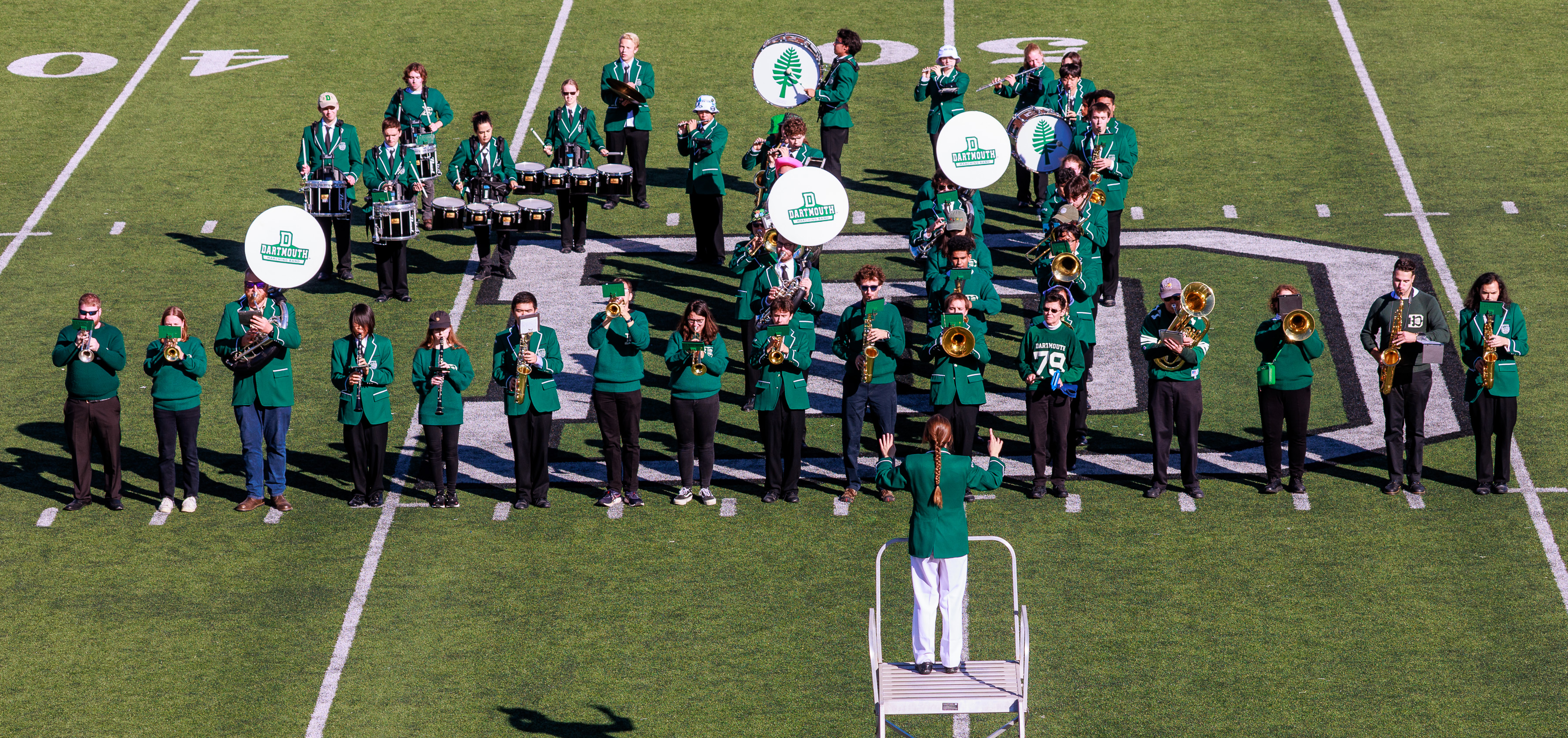

== Traditions and history ==
The band continues to play the old fight songs that have been played at football games for nearly a century. These songs include "Dartmouth's in Town Again," "Come Stand Up Men," "As the Backs Go Tearing By," and "Glory to Dartmouth" – collectively known as the "Dartmouth Tunes" or "DT's". The conclusion of each game is cause to play the Alma Mater, to which the football team and audience members sing, followed by an arrangement of "Hey Baby" from the Dirty Dancing soundtrack. Before home football games, the band marches through Hanover, New Hampshire's Main Street, playing a drum cadence and the Dartmouth Tunes.

In the week before classes begin, the members of the DCMB flock to campus for band camp where members refresh their musical abilities, as well as marching abilities since the band needs to look its best when marching on and off the field and around town in order to not distract from the ensemble's impeccable playing and scrumptious comedy.

Every Dartmouth Night Weekend, the band doubles in size as alumni return wearing sweaters knitted by the Faculty Advisor's wife, and march with the band. Some alumni have come back for more than 50 homecomings. The band demonstrates its only fancy marching during the halftime show, as band members march directly into a "D" formation, as originally choreographed by George A. Sotos, ‘83

For the senior game, DCMB senior members do a pants-less run across the field and perform the rest of the halftime show without pants.

=== Song repertoire ===
The song repertoire consists primarily of pop and classic rock as well as some TV and movie theme music, though new additions are constantly being added by students. Some of the band's most played songs include:

- Dartmouth Tunes (DT's):
  - "Dartmouth's in Town Again"
  - "Come Stand Up Men"
  - "As the Backs Go Tearing By"
  - "Glory to Dartmouth"
- "Alma Mater" (formerly known as "Men of Dartmouth")
