= 1958 NCAA Skiing Championships =

American college skiing competition

Coordinates: 43.787°N 72.1°W

Tournament information
- Sport: College skiing
- Location: (New Hampshire) Lyme, New Hampshire
- Dates: February 28 – March 2, 1958
- Administrator: NCAA
- Host: Dartmouth College
- Venue: Dartmouth Skiway
- Teams: 7
- Number of events: 4 (7 titles)

Final positions
- Champions: Dartmouth (1st title)
- 1st runners-up: Denver
- 2nd runners-up: Colorado

The 1958 NCAA Skiing Championships were contested at the Dartmouth Skiway in Lyme, New Hampshire at the fifth annual NCAA-sanctioned ski tournament to determine the individual and team national champions of men's collegiate alpine skiing, cross-country skiing, and ski jumping in the United States.

Host Dartmouth, coached by Al Merrill, edged four-time defending champion Denver in the team standings to claim their first national championship.

For the first time in its brief history, there were no repeat individual NCAA champions.

== Venue ==
This year's championships were held February 28 to March 2 in New Hampshire at the Dartmouth Skiway in Lyme, hosted by nearby Dartmouth College.

The fifth edition, these were the first NCAA championships in New Hampshire and the second in the East; the 1955 events were in central Vermont at Northfield, about fifty miles (80 km) northwest of Lyme.

The championships returned to Dartmouth Skiway in 1964, but rain forced the transfer of the alpine events to Cannon Mountain; the next time at Dartmouth was in 2003. The vertical drop of the Skiway in 2020 was approximately 970 feet (295 m).

== Team scoring ==
Location in the United States

Rank	Team	Points
1st place, gold medalist(s)	Dartmouth (H)	561.2
2nd place, silver medalist(s)	Denver	550.6
3rd place, bronze medalist(s)	Colorado	532.6
4	Middlebury	525.2
5	St. Lawrence	502.9
6	New Hampshire	440.7
7	Michigan Tech	374.3

== Individual events ==
Location in New Hampshire

Four events were held, which yielded seven individual titles.

Event	Champion		
Event	Skier	Team	Time/Score
Alpine	Dave Vorse	Dartmouth	1:38.2
Cross Country	(Canada) Clarence Servold	Denver	63:50
Downhill	Gary Vaughn	Norwich	1:48.5
Jumping	(Norway) Oddvar Rønnestad	Denver	214.7
Nordic	(Canada) Clarence Servold	Denver	1:33.5
Skimeister	Dave Harwood	Dartmouth	366.9
Slalom	Robert Gebhardt	Dartmouth	1:38.1

== See also ==
- List of NCAA skiing programs
