= 2003 NCAA Skiing Championships =

American college skiing competition

Tournament information
- Sport: College skiing
- Location: Lyme, New Hampshire
- Administrator: NCAA
- Host(s): Dartmouth College
- Venue(s): Dartmouth Skiway
- Teams: 22
- Number of events: 8

Final positions
- Champions: Utah (10th overall, 9th co-ed)
- 1st runners-up: Vermont
- 2nd runners-up: Colorado

The 2003 NCAA Skiing Championships were contested at the Dartmouth Skiway in Lyme, New Hampshire as part of the 50th annual NCAA-sanctioned ski tournament to determine the individual and team national champions of men's and women's collegiate slalom and cross-country skiing in the United States.

Utah, coached by Kevin Sweeney, won the team championship, the Utes' ninth co-ed title and tenth overall.

== Venue ==
This year's championships were contested at the Dartmouth Skiway in Lyme, New Hampshire. The event was hosted by nearby Dartmouth College.

These were the second NCAA championships hosted at the Dartmouth Skiway (1958 and 2003) and the eighth in the state of New Hampshire (1958, 1964, 1970, 1978, 1984, 1992, 1995, and 2003).

== Program ==
=== Men's events ===
- Cross country, 10 kilometer freestyle
- Cross country, 20 kilometer classical
- Slalom
- Giant slalom

=== Women's events ===
- Cross country, 5 kilometer freestyle
- Cross country, 15 kilometer classical
- Slalom
- Giant slalom

== Team scoring ==
Championships site

Rank	Team	Points
1st place, gold medalist(s)	Utah	682
2nd place, silver medalist(s)	Vermont	551
3rd place, bronze medalist(s)	Colorado (DC)	546 1/2
4	New Mexico	541 1/2
5	Denver	522 1/2
6	Dartmouth	472
7	Nevada	373 1/2
8	Middlebury	363 1/2
9	Alaska Anchorage	331 1/2
10	New Hampshire	307
11	Northern Michigan	259
12	Alaska Fairbanks	254
13	Colby	237 1/2
14	Williams	228 1/2
15	Western State	118
16	Bates	93
17	Whitworth	52
18	Montana State	45
19	Harvard	34
20	Michigan Tech	15
21	Wisconsin–Green Bay	7
22	St. Cloud State	5

- DC – Defending champions
- Debut team appearance

== See also ==
- List of NCAA skiing programs
