= Dartmouth Outing Club =

US collegiate outing club

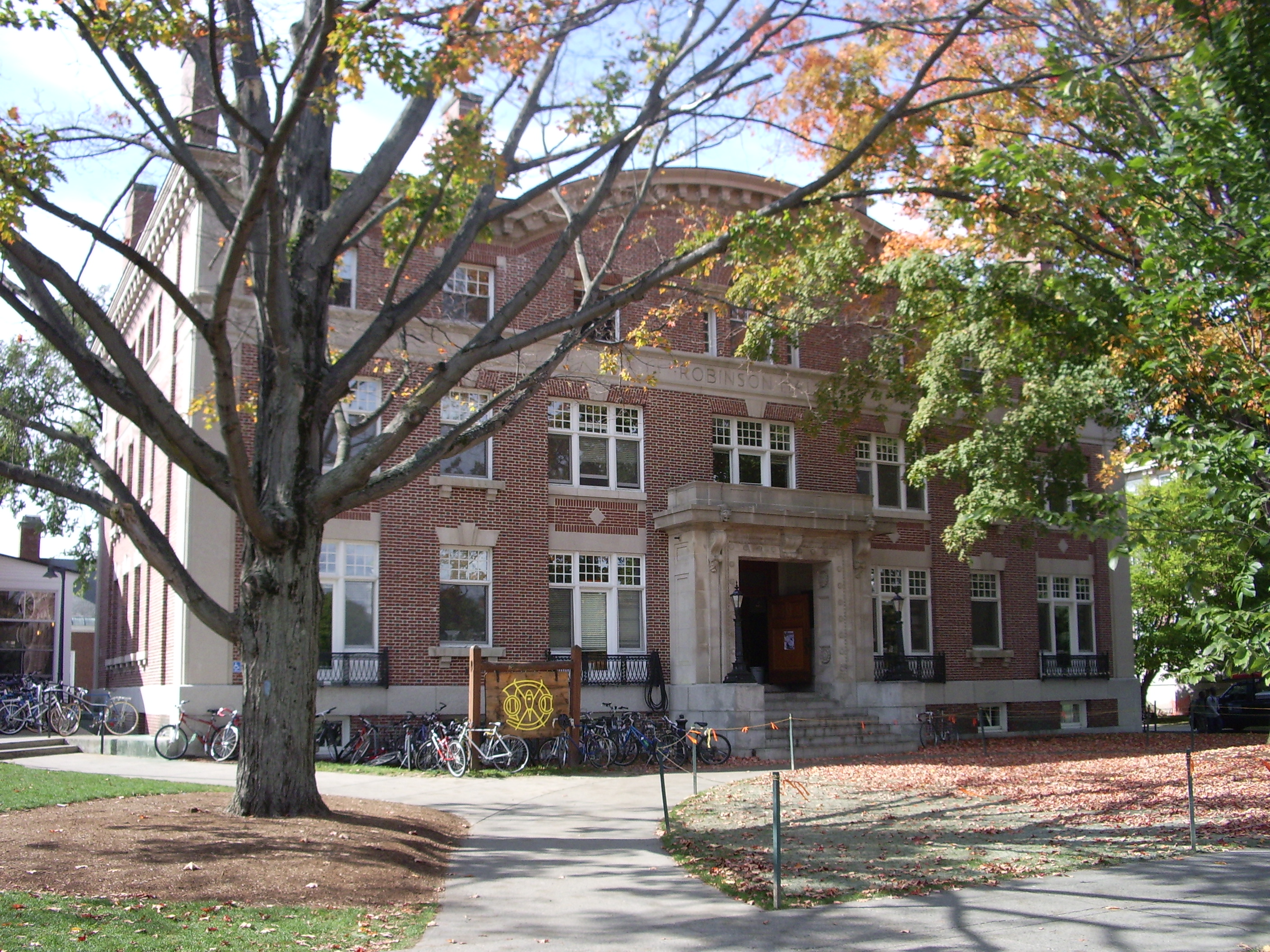
Robinson Hall, home to the Dartmouth Outing Club offices

The Dartmouth Outing Club (DOC) is a collegiate outing club in the United States. Proposed in 1909 by Dartmouth College student Fred Harris to "stimulate interest in out-of-door winter sports", the club soon grew to encompass the college's year-round outdoor recreation and has had a major role in defining Dartmouth College.

Today the club has over 1500 student members (and almost as many non-student members) and acts as an umbrella organization for over twenty member clubs, committees, and divisions that each specialize in an aspect of outdoor recreation.

Previously among them was the Dartmouth Ski Team whose members have participated in 25 Olympic Games, beginning with John B. Carleton, who as a member of the Dartmouth class of 1922 competed in Chamonix in cross country and Nordic combined. While this team was originally created under the DOC, it is now managed by Dartmouth Athletics.

== Member clubs, committees, and organizations ==
Club	Description
Archery Team	Practices and competes in target shooting.
Bait and Bullet	Hosts hunting and fishing trips, as well as practices and workshops at their campus-adjacent shooting range.
Biatholon	Facilitates biathlon gear rentals and covers registration fees for members that compete at the Ethan Allen Biathlon Club.
Cabin and Trail	Maintains over seventy miles of the Appalachian Trail running through Hanover and about a dozen cabins built by the DOC starting in 1910, hosts weekend hiking trips, and hosts weekly seminars on skills such as leading trips or trail maintenance.
Diversity, Inclusivity, Justice, and Equity	A division of the DOC, its purpose is to "coordinate, strengthen, and focus diversity, inclusion, equity, and justice within the Dartmouth community, specifically within the Dartmouth Outing Club." It provides resources, training, and guidance to help achieve these goals.
Environmental Students at Dartmouth	This division of the DOC aims to "promote environmental engagement and activism" by influencing the college's policies and management and holding initiatives like energy use and recycling programs, used gear sales, and various "stewardship activities".
Flora and Fauna	Holds many activities such as nature walks and birding, which are meant to help students connect with the environment and the history of the region.
Ledyard Canoe Club	Inspired by the life of Dartmouth Class of 1776 member John Ledyard, this club was formed in 1920 and holds paddling trips and expeditions, as well as renting out canoes and kayaks to students and community members.
Dartmouth Mountaineering Club	Holds weekend climbing trips to locations around New Hampshire as well as operating the Daniels Climbing Gym in Dartmouth's Maxwell Dorm.
Climbing Team	A subgroup of the Mountaineering Club formed in 2016, this club practices for USA Climbing Collegiate Climbing Series competitions.
Mountain Biking Club	Runs weekend trips to local trails and helps students with bike maintenance.
Organic Farm	Holds sessions on skills such as soil preparation and harvesting during the growing season, land-based workshops and festivals during the off season, beekeeping and maple syrup tapping.
POCO (People of Color Outdoors)	Organizes trips with primarily leaders of color in order to create "an environment with fewer barriers to entry for those members who want to try out the DOC or outdoor adventure in a more comfortable crowd."
Skate Club	A club for students to learn about and practice skateboarding both on campus and at local skate parks.
Dartmouth Ski Patrol	A section of the DOC's Winter Sports Division, this club provides patrol and rescue services for skiers on the Dartmouth Skiway and for various other clubs throughout the year. All patrollers hold various certifications, including Outdoor Emergency Care Technician and membership with the National Ski Patrol.
Alpine Ski Racing Club	A club for alpine skiers that does not compete at the varsity level.
Club Snowboarding Team	Competes in various racing and freestyle snowboarding competitions as well as supporting students at various skill levels.
Nordic Ski Club	Facilitates Nordic Skiing lessons and gear rentals as well as competing in the Eastern Collegiate Ski Conference (ECSC).
Student Risk Management Committee	A committee within the DOC that aims to "manage risk, establish and refine policy and procedures, and educate leaders on best practices, as well as follow up on incidents and improve training".
Surfing Club	Hold regular surfing trips to the New Hampshire coast.
Winter Sports Club	Originally founded to run competitive, intra and intercollegiate activities and govern ski racing in the Northeast, the club is dedicated to "furthering the burgeoning interest in backcountry ski touring"
Viva Hardigg Outdoors Club	Holds regular trips and seminars to help people of marginalized gender identities develop outdoor skills, confidence, and leadership.
Timber Team	Competes in lumberjack sports at the intercollegiate level.

== History ==
Fred Harris, a member of the Dartmouth College class of 1911, proposed in 1909 an outing club which would stimulate outdoor interest during the cold, winter months through skiing and snowshoeing. The club's first "formal" meeting took place on December 14, 1909, in the South Fayerweather dormitory. In 1910, a "Field Day" was established, which was a simple gathering time for groups to participate in outdoor activities. By 1911, the club had decided to enhance the Field Day by inviting women, holding further social festivities, and renaming it the "Winter Carnival". This event has been carried out every year since, except in 1918 due to lack of coal and wood.

Outing Club membership increased steadily throughout the next decade and by 1920, two-thirds of the student body were members. In February of that year, Fred Harris wrote an article in National Geographic Magazine entitled "Skiing over the New Hampshire Hills" primarily about the Dartmouth Outing Club. The spring after this article was published, the number of applicants to the college increased from 825 to 2625, forcing the college to become selective in admission for the first time.

In 1929, the Club built the Dartmouth Outing Club House on Occom Pond in Hanover. 1935 saw the introduction of Freshman Trips to encourage participation in the club, a tradition which is now among the largest pre-orientation programs in the country. By 1956, the Dartmouth Skiway was built at Holt's Ledge, replacing Oak Hill as the primary downhill skiing facility for the college. That same year, President Eisenhower joined the DOC.

The club faced a usual ebb and flow of activity for the later decades of the 20th century, but after the death of kayaker Mimi LeBeau on a kayaking trip in 1989, the club began to enforce stricter safety procedures. There was a board of students, administrators, and outside experts created to review trip proposals and ensure the safety of the club's activities. Several outside organizations such as National Outdoor Leadership School (NOLS) and Outward Bound were brought in to provide training for group and trip leaders.

Between 2001 and 2004, several directors of the club came and went, but notably in 2004, Andy Harvard was hired as the director of outdoor programs. A Dartmouth graduate himself, he had knowledge of the club from his time there as a student. Throughout his time as director, he shifted the focus in leadership of the club from the administration back towards the students, as it had been in previous years. Harvard was forcibly retired from his position in 2008 and died in 2019 due to younger-onset Alzheimer's.

After Harvard's departure, the club found their next director in then-dean and assistant to the president, Dan Nelson. Like Harvard, Nelson had also been active in the club during his time there as a student. Some of his main focuses for the future of the club are to increase its visibility on campus, include more minorities and lower-income students, and continue the club's long-running legacy of being mainly student driven.

=== Mount Moosilauke and the White Mountains ===
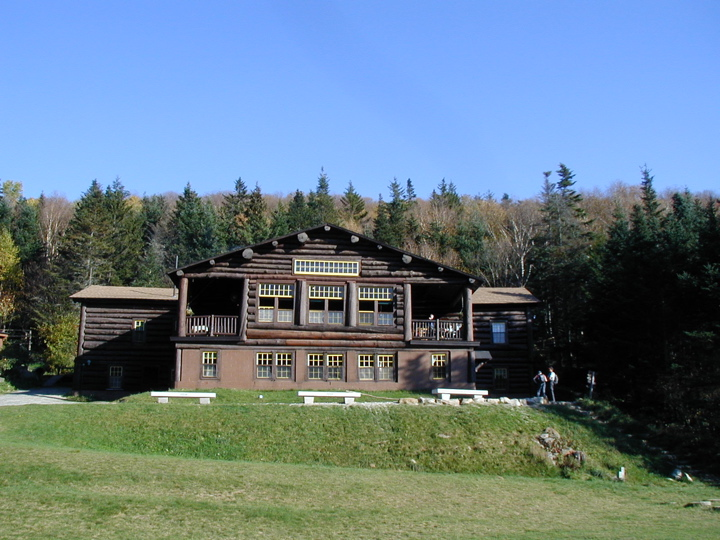
Moosilauke Ravine Lodge, maintained by the DOC

One of the Dartmouth Outing Club's unique features is that they own and maintain a variety of cabins and facilities that they use to conduct club activities.

The club had acquired a log cabin at the base of Mount Moosilauke by 1913, and was building another cabin nearby. Upon hearing this news, Johnny Johnson, Dartmouth class of 1866, decided to donate much of his real estate investments to the club. His donations led to a chain of cabins through the White Mountains, reaching a peak of 30 in number during the 1930s.

In 1926, the club's trail officially became a 75-mile (121 km) part of the Appalachian Trail, and member clubs such as Cabin and Trail began to be formed. The same year, the DOC established the Intercollegiate Winter Sports Union. The club was soon granted the Moosilauke Summit House, which served as a hotel and received nearly 3300 guests per year.

1935 saw the fire which destroyed Moosilauke's log cabin. After further investment in surrounding lands, the Moosilauke Ravine Lodge was built in 1939 as one of the largest log buildings in New Hampshire.

== See also ==
- List of university outing clubs
- Dartmouth College student groups
