= Toga party =

Greco-Roman–themed costume party

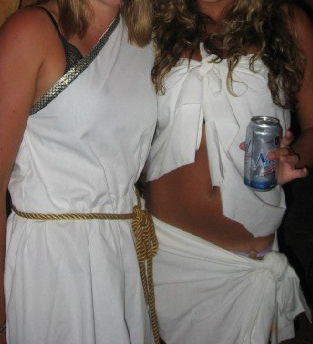
Women in makeshift "toga" outfits

A toga party is a Greco-Roman-themed costume party where attendees wear a garment inspired by ancient Roman clothing (normally made from a bed sheet) with sandals. The costumes, party games, and other entertainment often adhere to the Roman or Greek theme. Toga parties are associated with keg parties and excessive drinking, and attendees typically tend to be college or university students.

== History ==
First lady Eleanor Roosevelt held a toga party in 1934 to mock those who had compared her husband President Franklin D. Roosevelt to "Caesar".

The earliest known college toga parties took place in the United States in the early 1950s. Toga parties are recorded in the yearbooks for Theta Delta Chi (1952) and the University of Michigan's Acacia fraternity (1953). Another early toga party took place in 1953, when Pomona College students wore togas and ivy wreaths, and brought their dorm mattresses to freshman Mark Neuman's home on Hillcrest Avenue in nearby Flintridge.

For the eight decades before Greek-themed parties became known as "toga parties" in the 1950s, similar parties were generally called "bed sheet and pillow slip" parties (or simply, "pillow slip" parties), in which attendees wrapped themselves in sheets and pillow cases, were regularly held by fraternal orders (like the Masons, Odd Fellows and Elks), civic organizations, and church groups. In 1882, the Terpsichore Society of the Ohio State University held a "pillow slip party" which may arguably be considered the first known college toga party.

Although they are called "toga parties", attendants rarely wear togas, which were intricately draped garments made from large semicircles of fabric, instead wearing articles that more closely resemble chitons.

The Guinness World Record for the largest toga party is 3,700 participants. The event, organized by the University of Queensland Union and the Queensland University of Technology Student Guild, was held on 24 February 2012 at Riverstage in Brisbane, Queensland, Australia.

== In popular culture ==
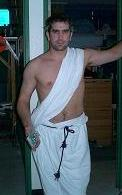
Man in "toga" outfit

A toga party was depicted in the 1978 film Animal House, which propelled the ritual into a widespread and enduring practice. Chris Miller, who was one of the writers of Animal House, attended Dartmouth College where the toga party was a popular costume event at major fraternity parties (such as Winter Carnival and Green Key Weekend) during the late 1950s and early 1960s.

A toga party was also briefly described in Tom Wolfe's 1968 story "The Pump House Gang", although somewhat different from the version in the film. Toga parties are also seen in the first episode of season four of the television series Greek and in the fourth episode of Silicon Valley.

"The World's Largest Toga Party" was the tagline of WrestleMania IX.

== See also ==
- Athenian festivals
- Roman festivals
