= Fred Hovey Allen =

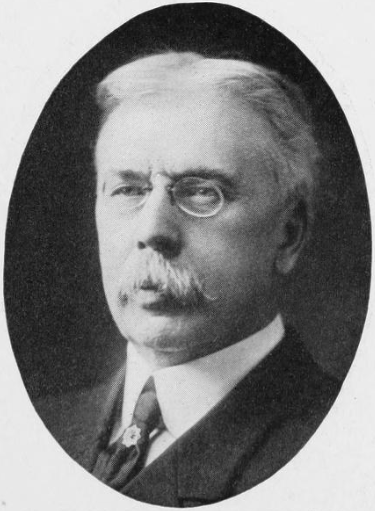
- Born: October 1, 1845; Lyme, New Hampshire
- Died: December 26, 1926 (aged 81); New York, New York
- Education: Hartford Theological Seminary; Boston University
- Occupation(s): Clergyman, writer

Fred Hovey Allen (1845–1926) was an American Congregational clergyman and author, best known as the inventor of the first photogravure plates for art reproduction made in the United States.

== Biography ==
Fred Hovey Allen was born in Lyme, New Hampshire on October 1, 1845. He graduated from the Hartford Theological Seminary, and studied at Boston University and in Europe at the Universities of Berlin, Vienna, and Paris.

He died in Manhattan on December 26, 1926.

His writings include:

- Masterpieces of Modern German Art (1884)
- Recent German Art (1885)
- Grand Modern Paintings (1888)
