= Visionists =

The Visionists were an informal social club based in Boston, Massachusetts in the late 19th century, focused on the members' shared interests in artists, writers, and cultural movements. Documented members included:

- Writer/architect Ralph Adams Cram
- Publisher/photographer F. Holland Day
- Designer/architect Bertram Grosvenor Goodhue
- Poet Bliss Carman
- Poet Richard Hovey
- Musician/composer Frederic Field Bullard
- Editor/Publisher/Entrepreneur Herbert Small (co-founder of the world's first public relations firm)
- Publisher Herbert Copeland
- Publisher/photographer Francis Watts Lee
- Illustrator/painter Thomas Buford Meteyard
- Playwright/actor John C. "Jack" Abbott
- Writer Jonathan Thayer Lincoln

Poet Louise Imogen Guiney and writer Alice Brown were close with this group and participated in at least some of their gatherings. Their extended circle of friends also included illustrator Ethel Reed, art historian Bernard Berenson, and poet Gelett Burgess.

According to Cram's autobiography, the Visionists were a "social-controversial-inspiration group" that never numbered more than twenty, made up of the "madder and more fantastic members" of a similar but larger group called "The Pewter Mugs". They held periodic meetings in their "hideout" on Boston's Province Court, as well as gatherings in suburban locations such as Day's house in Norwood, Massachusetts or a house shared by Thomas Buford Meteyard and his mother in Scituate, Massachusetts.

The members' shared interests included medieval art and architecture, Aestheticism, the Decadent movement, Christian socialism, the Arts and Crafts movement, the Pre-Raphaelites, and Theosophy. Favorite writers and artists included Oscar Wilde, William Morris, John Ruskin, and Dante Gabriel Rossetti. From 1892 to 1893 the group edited a literary journal titled The Knight Errant, published by Francis Watts Lee.
