= Dartmouth Skiway =

Ski area

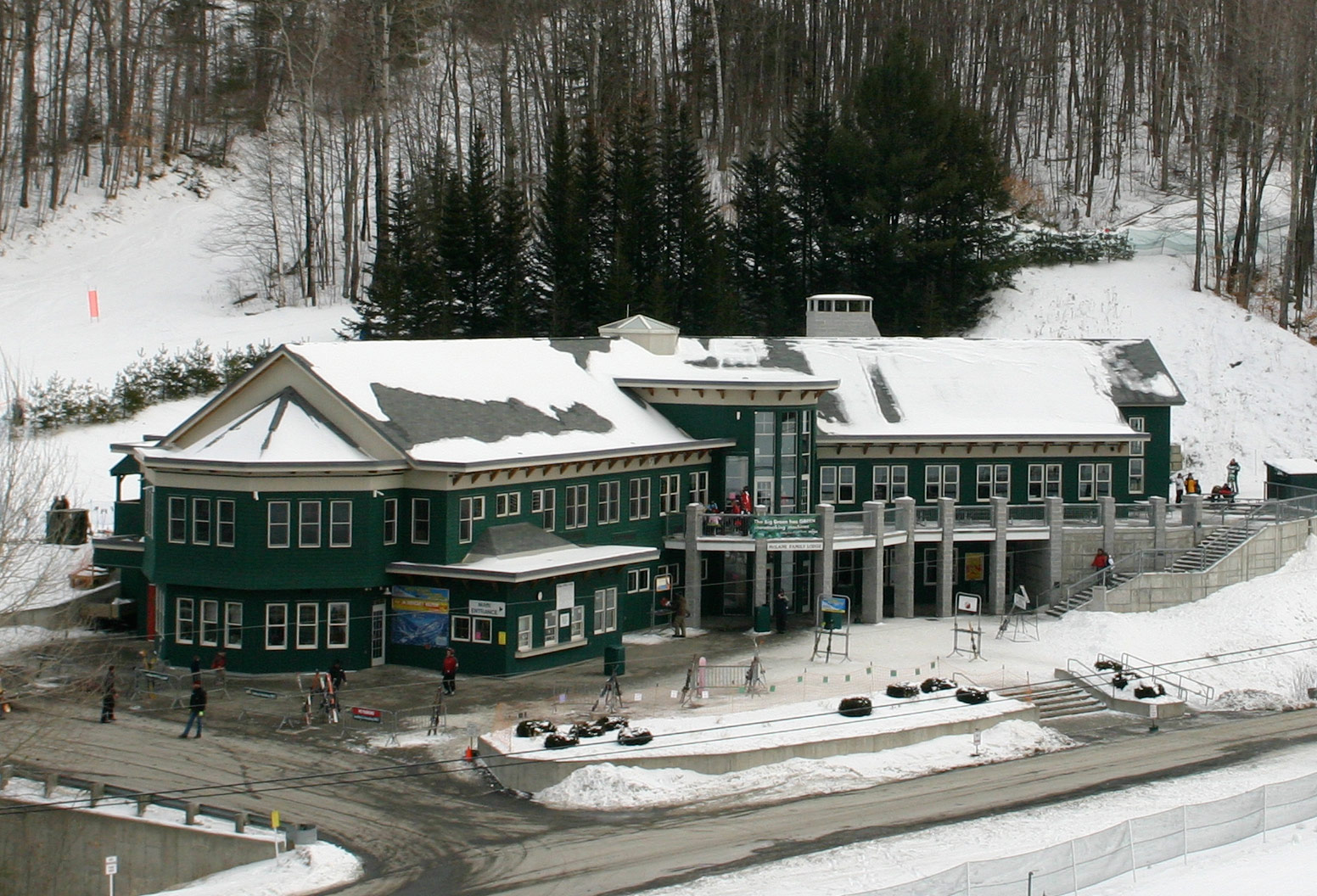
- The McLane Family Lodge in 2007
- Interactive map of Dartmouth Skiway
- Location: Holt's Ledge and Winslow Ledge; Lyme, New Hampshire, U.S.
- Nearest city: Lebanon: 15 miles (24 km)
- Coordinates: 43°47′12″N 72°26′2″W
- Vertical: 968 feet (295 m)
- Top elevation: 1,943 feet (592 m)
- Base elevation: 975 feet (297 m)
- Skiable area: 100 acres (40 ha)
- Trails: 30; 25% Novice; 50% Intermediate; 25% Expert
- Longest run: 1.25 miles (2.0 km)
- Lift system: 1 Quad, 1 Double, 2 carpets
- Lift capacity: 3,300 per hour
- Terrain parks: 1
- Snowmaking: 70%
- Website: skiway.dartmouth.edu

The Dartmouth Skiway is a ski area in the northeastern United States, in Lyme, New Hampshire. Located about twenty minutes northeast of Dartmouth College, it has thirty trails from easiest (green circle) to most difficult (black diamond) on over one hundred acres (40 ha) of skiable area.

== The mountain ==
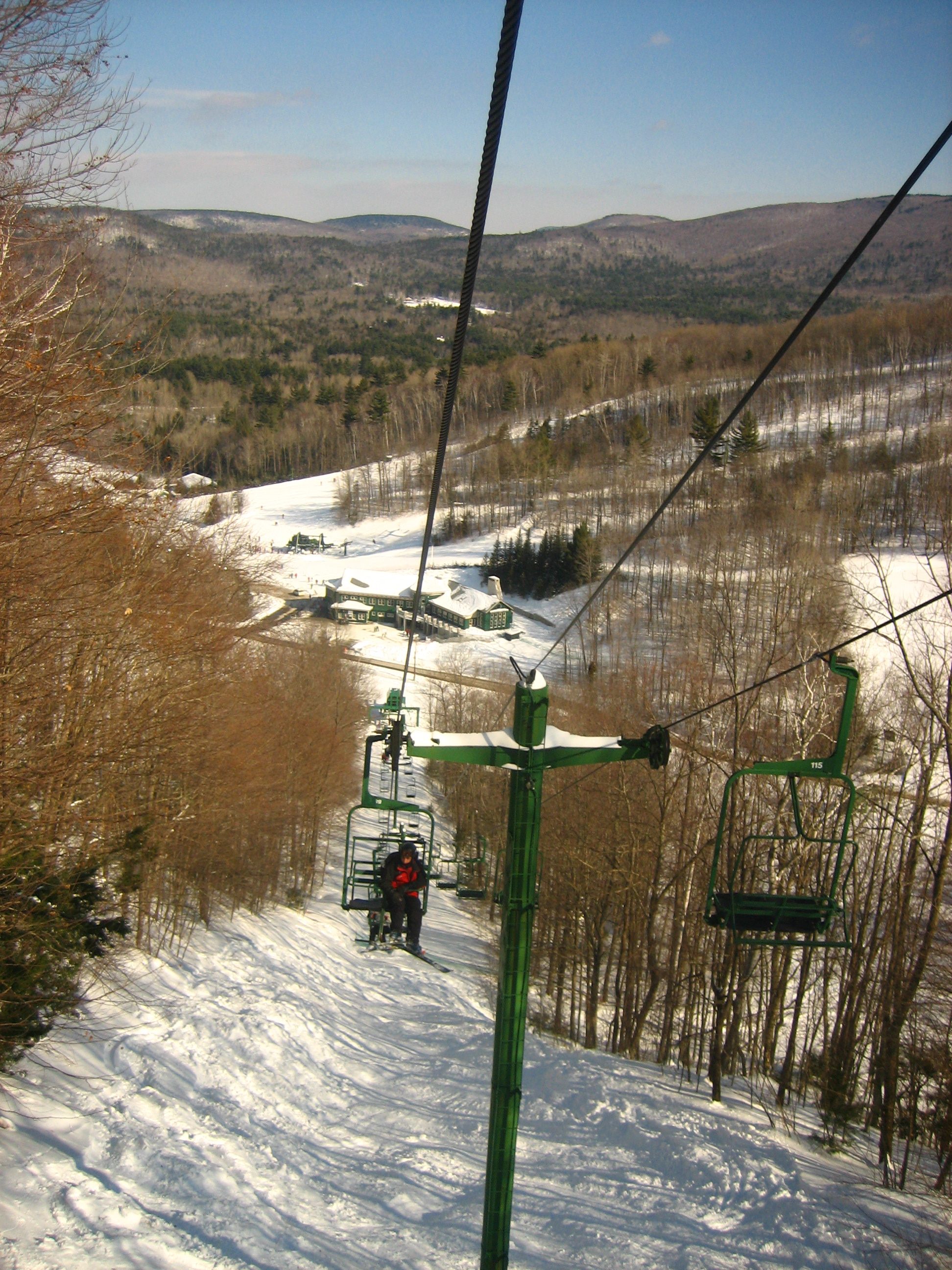
The classic New England Holts Ledge Double chair

The Dartmouth Skiway has a lift-served summit elevation of 1,943 feet (592 m) above sea level and a base elevation of 975 feet (297 m), yielding a vertical drop of 968 feet (295 m). Its longest trail is 1.25 miles (2.0 km). There are three lifts which serve the trails at the skiway, including the Winslow Mountain Quad, the Holt's Ledge Double, and the Magic Carpet Beginner Lift. These lifts give the ski area an uphill capacity of 3,300 skiers per hour.

Snowmaking covers about seventy percent of the area with over fifteen snowguns. There is a terrain park located on the Winslow side. The Dartmouth Skiway Ski and Snowboard School has a staff of over 35 instructors. The slopes are patrolled by the Dartmouth Ski Patrol, a joint community and student first aid volunteer organization. The Dartmouth Ski Team hosts the alpine skiing events of the Dartmouth Winter Carnival there annually.

== History ==
Location in New Hampshire

Descended from an earlier, smaller operation on nearby Oak Hill in Hanover, the Dartmouth Skiway opened 69 years ago in 1957 with a Pomalift on one peak. For the 1960–61 season, a T-bar was also erected for a novice slope. In 1968, a new trail pod was opened with a double chairlift, located across the street on Winslow Ledge.

In the 1970s and 1980s, many improvements were made to the area, including replacing the Pomalift with a Hall double chairlift and snowmaking installation. In the next ten years a CTEC quad chairlift was installed and the new McLane Family Lodge was constructed, replacing the previous one. Like many other New England ski resorts, it hosts events and functions in the off-season.

Dartmouth Skiway hosted the NCAA Skiing Championships in 1958 and 2003.
