= Richard Hovey =

American poet (1864–1900)

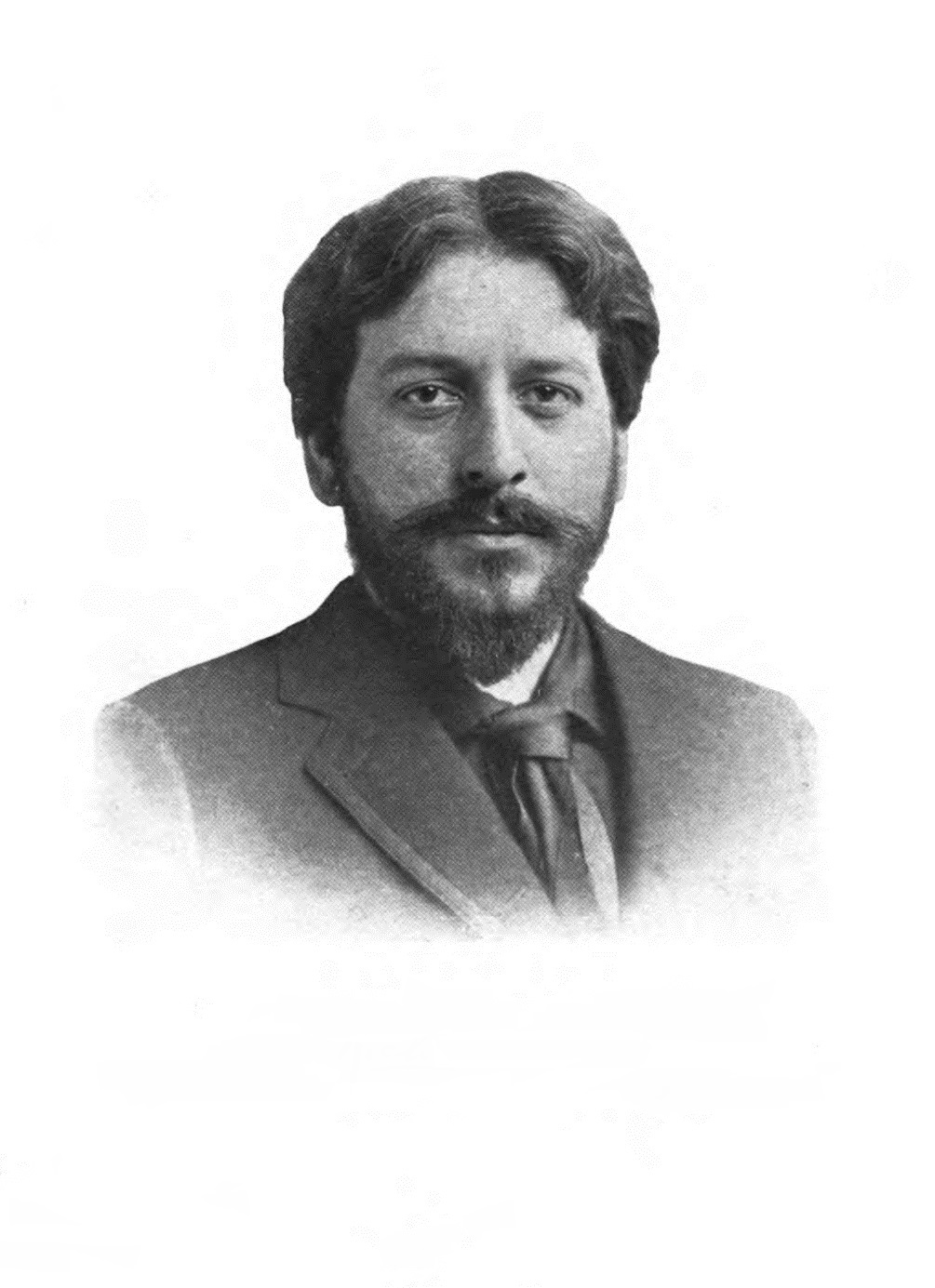
- Richard Hovey, from the frontispiece of To the End of the Trail (1908).
- Born: May 4, 1864; Normal, Illinois
- Died: February 24, 1900 (aged 35); New York, New York
- Occupations: poet, playwright, translator
- Writing career
- Period: 1880 – 1900
- Notable work: Songs from Vagabondia

Signature
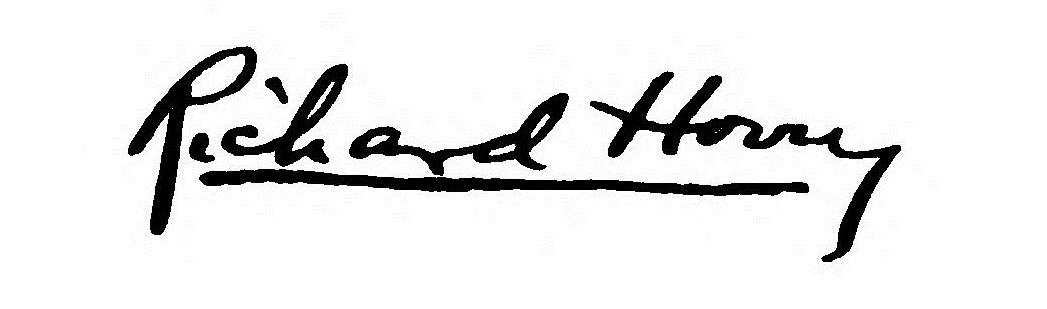

Richard Hovey (May 4, 1864 – February 24, 1900) was an American poet. Graduating from Dartmouth College in 1885, he is known in part for penning the school Alma Mater, Men of Dartmouth.

== Biography ==
Hovey was born in Normal, Illinois, the son of Major General Charles Edward Hovey and Harriet Spofford Hovey. He grew up in North Amherst, Massachusetts, and in Washington, D.C., before attending Dartmouth. His first volume of poems was privately published in 1880.

He collaborated with Canadian poet Bliss Carman on three volumes of "tramp" verse: Songs from Vagabondia (1894), More Songs from Vagabondia (1896), and Last Songs from Vagabondia (1900), the last being published after Hovey's death. Hovey and Carman were members of the "Visionists" social circle along with F. Holland Day and Herbert Copeland, who published the "Vagabondia" series.

Some twenty-nine poets have attempted to write sequels for Byron's Don Juan. Hovey was one of them. Samuel Claggett Chew praised Hovey's "Canto XVII" in his book To the End of the Trail. "This is one of the most convincing reproductions of the spirit and movement of Byron's verse that I have ever come across. It is supposed to be written by Byron in Hades. The poet refuses to take up the poem at the point at which Death had cut him short.—

Southey’s forgotten; so is Castlereagh;
But there are fools and scoundrels still today.

In the sequel we hear nothing of Juan; the satire is expended upon current affairs. Byron is full of curiosity as to events on earth:

I’ve such a next-day’s thirst for information,
I’d even be content to read the Nation.

He died after undergoing minor surgery for a varicocele in 1900.

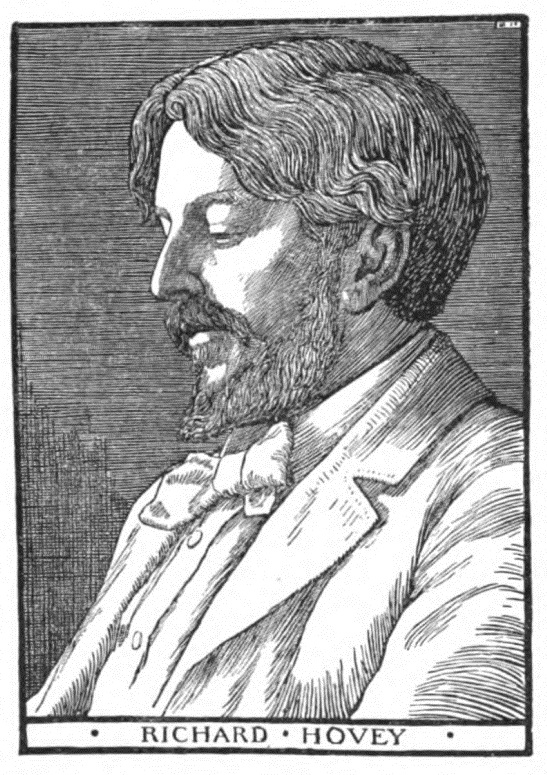
Richard Hovey, by Robert Bryden.

== Selected poems ==
- Sea Gypsy by Richard Hovey
- When We Are Dead by Richard Hovey
- John Keats
- To a Friend
- Philosophy
- The Old Pine
- In Memoriam
- Squab Flights
- Kronos
- College Days
- Dante Gabriel Rossetti
- The South
