= Warren Chivers =

American cross-country skier (1914–2006)

Personal information
- Born: December 12, 1914 Hanover, New Hampshire, United States
- Died: August 18, 2006 (aged 91) Springfield, Vermont, United States

Sport
- Sport: Cross-country skiing

Warren Chivers (December 12, 1914 – August 18, 2006) was an American cross-country skier. He competed in the men's 18 kilometre event at the 1936 Winter Olympics.
