= Moosilauke Ravine Lodge =

Coordinates: 43°59′36″N 71°48′59″W

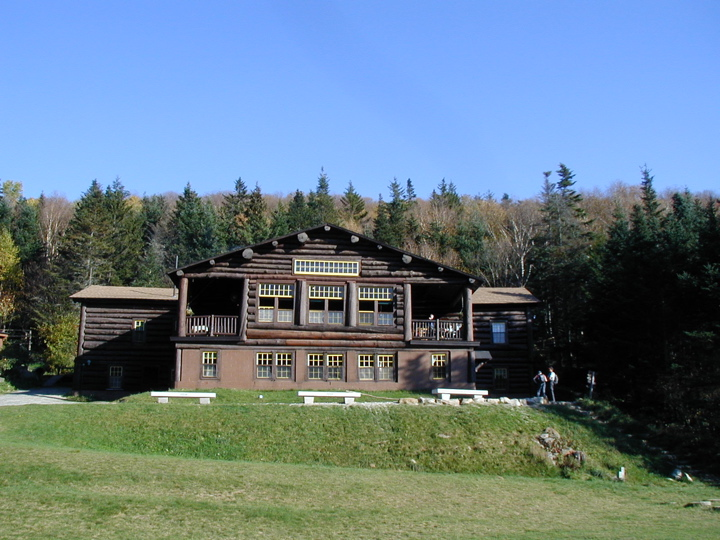
The Old Lodge (1938–2016), the former main building of the Moosilauke Ravine Lodge complex

Moosilauke Ravine Lodge is a cabin complex at the base of Mount Moosilauke in the White Mountains of New Hampshire. Owned and operated by Dartmouth College, the Lodge is open to the public from May through November.

The Lodge is managed by the Outdoor Programs Office and staffed by Dartmouth College and Dartmouth Outing Club students and recent alumni. The lodge is open from May to mid-November, with two weeks starting in the end of August reserved for the Dartmouth First-Year Trips. The staff provides a family-style dinner every night by reservation only, open to community members, Appalachian Trail thru-hikers, tourists, and Dartmouth professors. In summer, the lodge also houses the Trail Crew, a crew of Dartmouth Outing Club students who help maintain the seventeen Dartmouth Cabins and the 50 miles (80 km) of Appalachian Trail between Hanover and Mount Moosilauke.

The Lodge was shut for a year as part of a major reconstruction project from September 2016 to October 2017. The new Lodge was dedicated on October 14, 2017 and opened the next day.

== History ==
=== Precursors to the Ravine Lodge ===
Dartmouth maintained and operated a building on the summit of Moosilauke called the Summit Camp from 1920-1942, until the building burned down due to a lightning strike. Later, the Ravine Camp was built in 1933 to access skiing on the mountain. This building burned down in 1935 and was replaced by the first Ravine Lodge.

=== Old Lodge (1938 - 2016) ===
The old main lodge structure, built on the site of old horse stables, was completed in 1938 under the direction of woodsman C. Ross McKenney from native spruce cut on the mountain. It was originally intended as a ski lodge, and hosted some of the nation's earliest competitive skiing. However, the harsh New Hampshire winters made heating the large log structure a severe challenge, and during the rise of other large mountain ski resorts in the 1950s, the Moosilauke Ravine Lodge fell into disuse. It was saved from ruin by Al Merrill, Director of Outdoor Programs and ski coach, who championed its value for students and the community. The Lodge outlived its useful life and was torn down in September 2016 for the construction of the new Lodge.

=== New Lodge (2016 - present) ===
The new Lodge was constructed between September 2016 and October 2017. It maintains many elements from the old lodge and a similar floor plan, including a downstairs library, lounge, mud room and restrooms; on the second floor a large main room for dining and events, a large kitchen, and three bunk rooms. Two conference rooms were also added to the new Lodge.

== Layout ==
The term "Moosilauke Ravine Lodge" actually refers to a complex of buildings. The main building (referred to as "The Lodge") has the kitchen, dining room, mudroom, lounge, library, three bunk rooms, two conference rooms, and the bathroom facilities. The outlying buildings are five bunkhouses (the Classes of '65, '66, '67, '74, and '78 Bunkhouses), each sleeping between 20 and 30 people. The dining room and library of the lodge are heated, when necessary, by large stone fireplaces. In addition to providing showers to hikers, the front desk rents out linens and sells some basic hiking supplies.

The complex lies in a valley above the Baker River on the southeast flank of Mt. Moosilauke, with access to more than 30 miles (48 km) of trails, which range from easy walks to strenuous hikes. The lodge is not far from the Appalachian Trail, which crosses over the top of Mt. Moosilauke, the first point for through-hikers arriving from the south where the trail rises above tree line.
