= Dartmouth College traditions =

Aspect of Dartmouth culture

The traditions of Dartmouth College, an American Ivy League college in Hanover, New Hampshire, are deeply entrenched in the student life of the institution and are well known nationally. Dartmouth's website counts the college's "special traditions" among its "essential elements", and in his inauguration address, former College president James E. Wright said that the school is "a place that is marked by strong traditions". Some of these traditions remain supported by the administration, while others are officially discouraged.

== Weekends ==
Dartmouth functions on a quarter system, and one weekend each term is set aside as a traditional celebratory event, known on campus as "big weekends" or "party weekends". In the fall, winter, spring, and summer respectively, these weekends are Homecoming (officially Dartmouth Night Weekend), Winter Carnival, Green Key, and Tubestock, the last of which has been canceled indefinitely and was replaced in 2006 by an event called Fieldstock.

=== Homecoming and Dartmouth Night ===
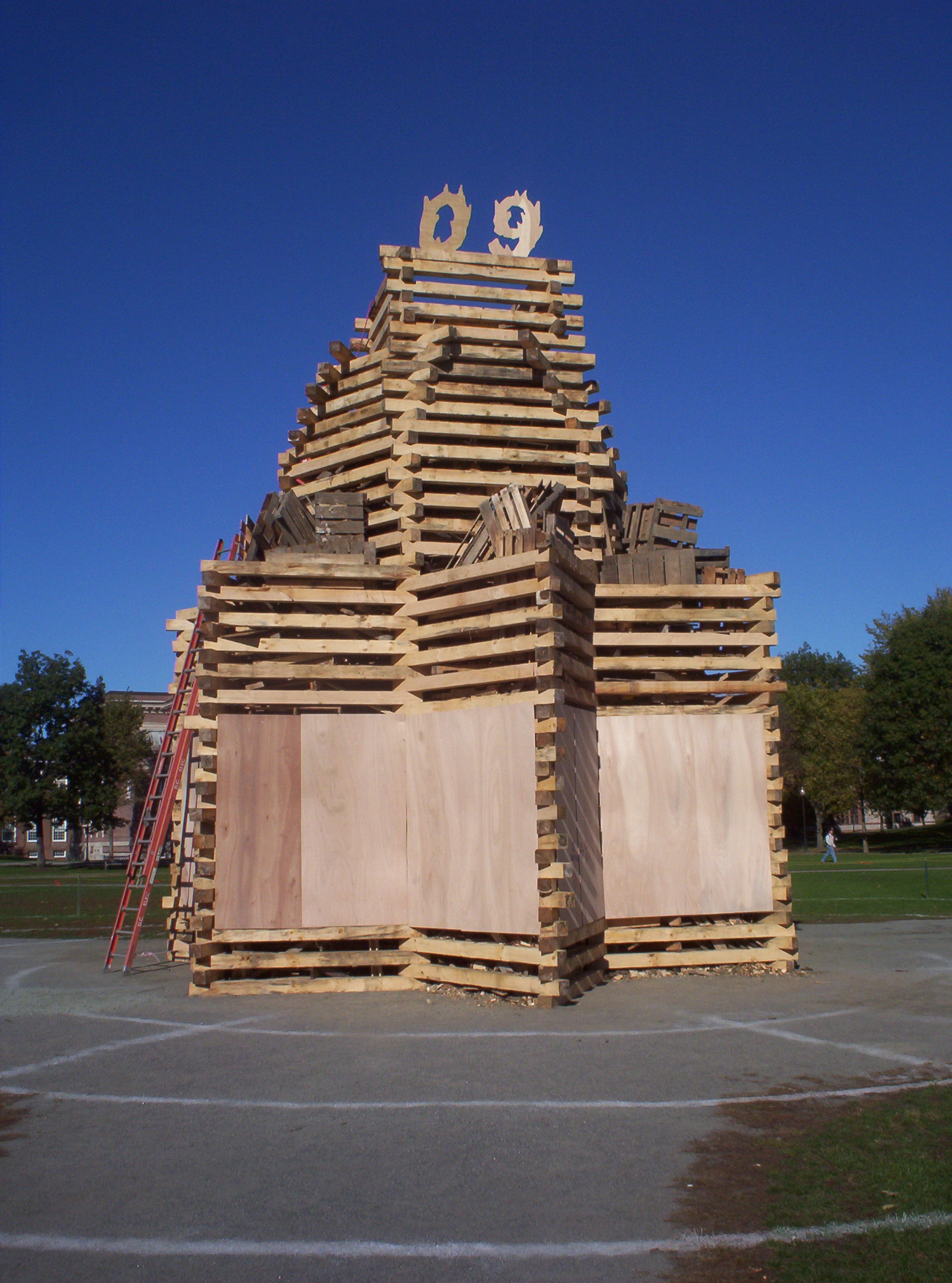
The Class of 2009's bonfire on the afternoon before Dartmouth Night.

Dartmouth Night starts the college's traditional "Homecoming" weekend with an evening of speeches, a parade, and a bonfire. Traditionally, the freshman class builds the bonfire and then runs around it a set number of times in concordance with their class year; the class of 2009 performed 109 circuits, the class of 1999 performed 99, etc.

The college officially discourages a number of student traditions of varying degrees of antiquity. During the circling of the bonfire, upperclassmen encourage the freshmen to "touch the fire", an action legally considered trespassing and prohibited by police officials present. At halftime of the Homecoming football game on the Saturday of the weekend, some upperclassmen encourage freshman to "rush the field", although no upperclassman has seen a significant rush since several injuries sustained during the 1986 rush prompted the school to ban the practice. Among the two or three students who sometimes run across the field, those who are arrested are charged with trespassing (the independent newspaper The Dartmouth Review claimed to set up a fund to automatically pay any fines associated with freshman who rush the field.) However, in 2012 this was proven false when two students rushed the field and were arrested for disorderly conduct. The Dartmouth Review ignored their emails until finally replying and denying that this fund had ever existed. These students then had to pay $300 fines out of pocket. For the 2011 Homecoming game, however, over 40 members of the Class of 2015 rushed the field at homecoming without any action taken by Safety and Security or the Hanover Police Department.

==== History ====
President William Jewett Tucker introduced the ceremony of Dartmouth Night in 1895. The evening of speeches celebrated the accomplishments of the college's alumni. Originally the event took place in the Old Chapel in Dartmouth Hall, and it moved outdoors within about fifteen years.

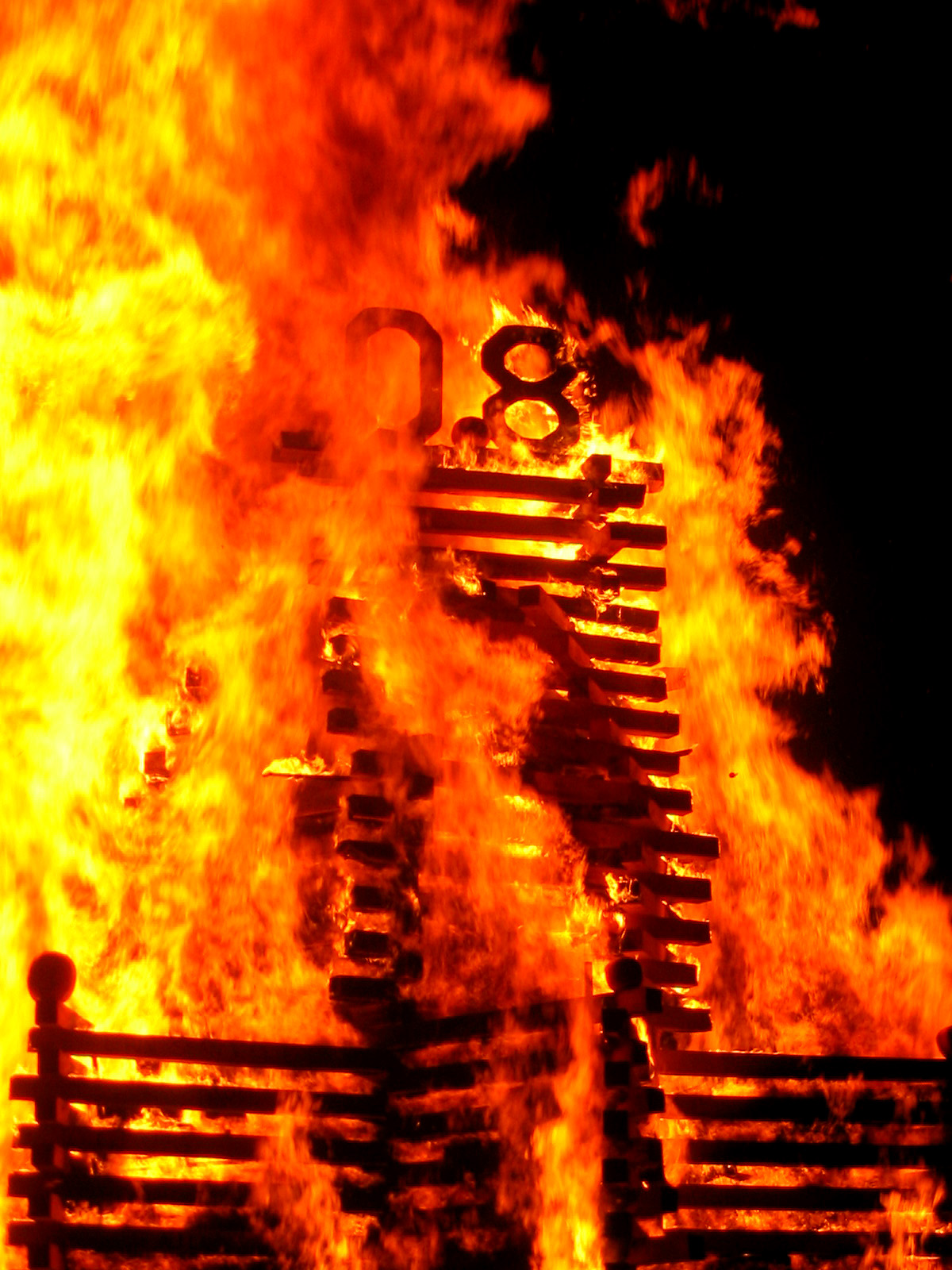
Bonfire at the 2004 Dartmouth Night. The "08" stands for the Class of 2008, the freshman class that year

The focus of Dartmouth Night is the bonfire. Students had built bonfires during the late nineteenth century to celebrate sports victories, including one in 1888 that recognized a baseball victory over Manchester. An editorial in The Dartmouth criticized that fire, saying, "It disturbed the slumbers of a peaceful town, destroyed some property, made the boys feel that they were being men, and in fact did no one any good."

By the mid-twentieth century, Dartmouth Night was set to coincide with one of the several annual bonfires, and that pairing helped preserve the one bonfire that now remains.

In 1904, the Earl of Dartmouth visited the campus on Dartmouth Night with New Hampshire politician and author Winston Churchill and marched around the Green with the students. Early on, the tradition of reading out telegrams (later e-mail messages) sent that night from alumni clubs around the country began.

Football first began to be associated with Dartmouth Night during the 1920s. Memorial Field was dedicated on Dartmouth Night in 1923. For decades the raucous pre-football rallies remained separate from the dignified official activities. In 1936, the college first began the tradition of football games during this weekend; ten years later the formal College events and the rally were combined in a single grand event, and for the first time Dartmouth Night was intentionally scheduled on what is called Dartmouth Night Weekend.

During the 1950s, students adopted a star-hexagon-square structure for the bonfire. Through at least the late 1980s, it was a tradition for the number of tiers to equal the year of the first-year class, i.e., in 1985 the first-year class was the Class of 1988, and the bonfire was 88 tiers high. An exception to this was 1975 when the Partycipatory Class of 1979 set the record for the tallest bonfire at 101 tiers. Thereafter it was decreed by Dean Ralph Manuel that the height of the bonfire be limited to the class number. On or about the bonfire of the Class of 1990 the college put an additional cap on the height of the bonfire, as the increasingly tall structure was increasingly dangerous, and following the bonfire accident at Texas A&M in 1999, the school hired professionals to do some of the building; nevertheless the night still remains a highlight of the school year.

=== Winter Carnival ===
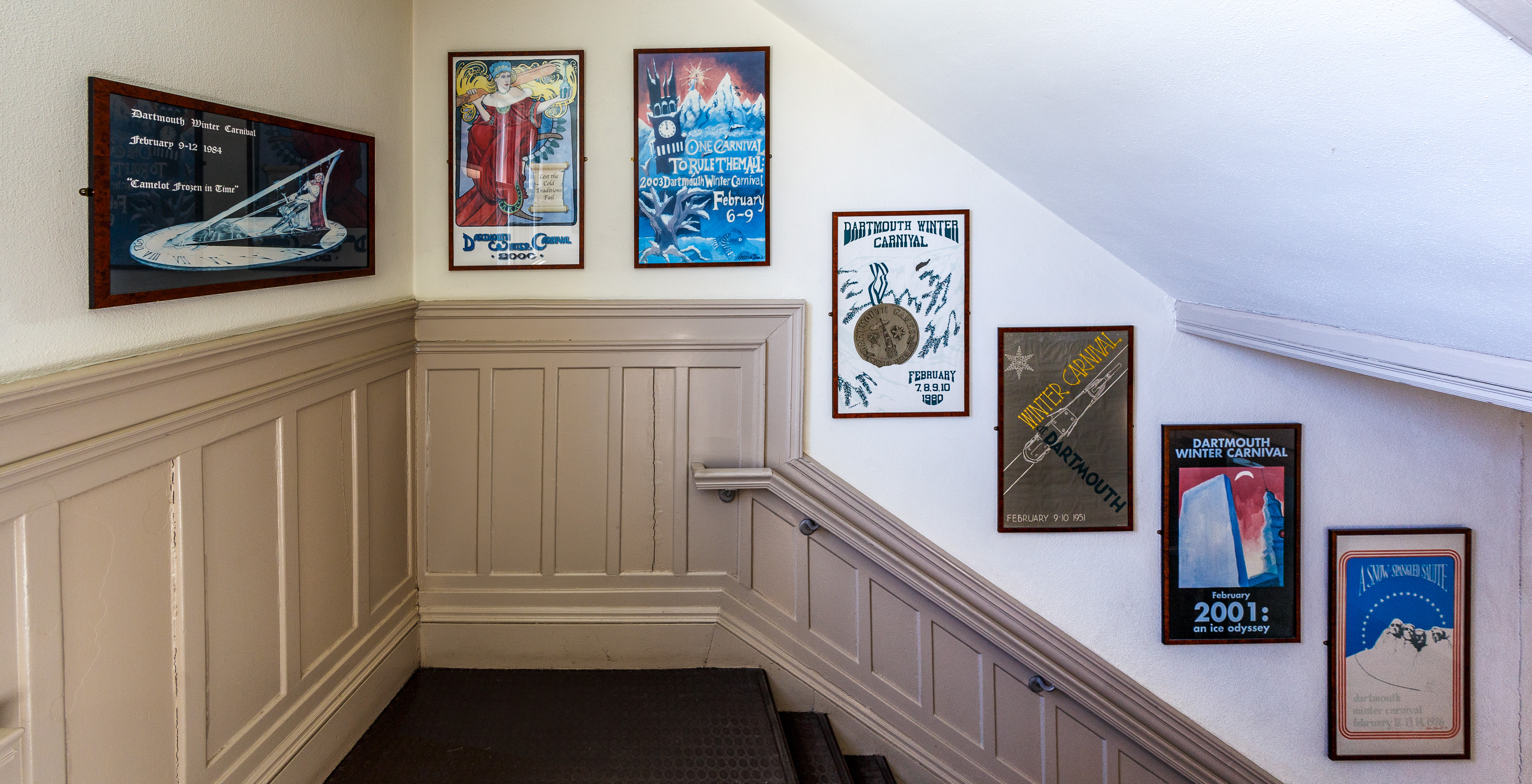
Posters for Winter Carnival adorn the stairwell in Dartmouth's Collis Center

Winter Carnival is a long-standing tradition at Dartmouth College that was particularly famous during the 1920s, 1930s, and 1940s. The Dartmouth Outing Club, founded in 1909, organized a winter weekend "field day" in 1910. This was an athletic event centered on skiing, a sport which the Outing Club helped to pioneer and publicize on a national scale. In 1911, the event was named Winter Carnival, social events were added, and women were invited to attend. By 1919 the emphasis had shifted to dances organized by fraternities. Special trains made runs to transport women guests to Dartmouth, and National Geographic Magazine referred to it as "the Mardi Gras of the North". The event became famous, much as Spring Break in Fort Lauderdale was to be during the 1950s and 1960s.

Carnival was the subject of the frothy 1939 motion picture comedy Winter Carnival, starring Ann Sheridan, who plays a former Winter Carnival Queen of the Snows who has made a bad marriage to a European duke and revisits Dartmouth in an attempt to save her younger sister, the current Queen, from repeating her mistake with a European count.

The movie is remembered mostly for its extracinematic associations; F. Scott Fitzgerald and Dartmouth alumnus Budd Schulberg were hired to write the screenplay. While gathering background in Hanover during Carnival, Fitzgerald became scandalously drunk at fraternities and was forced to leave the project. Although portions of his work were used, he was not given a writer's credit. The events and personalities bear a resemblance to those recounted in Schulberg's novel, The Disenchanted.

Winter Carnival takes place each year on a weekend in February and include such events as ski competitions at the Dartmouth Skiway and Oak Hill Ski Center; a polar bear swim; a cappella and jazz concerts; a human dogsled race; a drag ball; and a showing of the 1939 movie. Students build a large Carnival-themed snow sculpture on the college Green. The 1987 sculpture held the Guinness record for the "tallest snowman". The sculpture in 2004 reflected the famous character The Cat in the Hat, in honor of the 100th birthday of Dartmouth alumnus and creator of the character, Dr. Seuss. Dartmouth has a historical connection and affiliation with Lewiston-based liberal arts college, Bates College, that includes similar traditions such as the Dartmouth Challenge, dual engineering programs, campus parallels and an athletic rivalry. The tradition of Winter Carnival is the oldest in the United States, which is followed by Bates who founded their Winter Carnival two years after Dartmouth.

Numerous parties are thrown by the campus's fraternities and sororities. In 1999, students cancelled their parties to protest other administration policies. In 2000, Psi Upsilon fraternity was forced by the Administration to ban its annual "Keg Jump" event, marking the end of a 19-year tradition in which brothers attempted to jump over a line of kegs on ice skates.

==== Carnival Themes Over the Years ====
- North Side Story 1962
- Winter Wanderlust 1966
- A Midwinter Night's Dream 1967
- Klondike Kaleidoscope 1968
- Land of Fire & Ice 1969
- Sometimes in Winter ... 1970
- Ooh ... Meanwhile, Back at the Dartmouth Winter Carnival 1970
- Fun for the Whole Family 1971
- The Winterland of Oz 1972
- Through a Frosted Looking Glass 1973
- The Winterful World of Disney 1974
- Valhalla – Beyond the North Winds 1975
- A Snow-Spangled Salute 1976
- The Spirit of Wintergreen 1977
- The Greatest Snow on Earth 1978
- The Great Cold Rush 1979
- Winter Takes All 1980
- Hanover Hears a Who 1981
- Adventures on the High Freeze 1982
- The Rise and Fall of the Frozen Empire 1983
- Camelot Frozen in Time 1984
- A Diamond in the Rough 1985
- Where the Wild Things Are 1986
- Blizzard on Bourbon Street 1987
- Winter Games of Old: Gods and Goddesses and Gold
- Break Out of Hibernation 1989
- It's a Grimm Winter 1990
- Atlantice: A Winter Under the Sea 1991
- How the Grinch Stole Carnival 1992
- Sun, Surf, and Snow 1993
- When Hanover Freezes Over ... All Carnival Breaks Loose 1994
- Call of the Wild 1995
- 'Round the Girdled Earth They Roamed: A Prehistoric Carnival 1996
- 'Twas a Cold and Snowy Knight: A Medieval Carnival 1997
- The Roaring −20°s 1998
- Gone to the Dogs 1999
- Lest the Cold Traditions Fail 2000
- 2001: An Ice Odyssey 2001
- There's Snow Place Like Home 2002
- One Carnival to Rule Them All 2003
- Oh, The Places It Snows: A Seussentennial 2004
- A Dartmouth Neverland 2005
- Mischief in the Snow 2006
- Down the Rabbit Hole 2007
- 20,000 Leagues Under the Snow 2008
- Summiting a Century: 100 Years of the DOC 2009
- I Came, I Saw, I Carnivaled 2010
- Carnival of the Century 2011
- Carnival in Candy Land 2012
- A Very Grimm Carnival 2013
- A Carnival of Thrones 2014
- Mission: Winter Carnival - License to Chill 2022
- Jurassic Parka: The Carnival Before Time 2025
- The Blizzard of Oz: Wicked Cold 2026

=== Green Key Weekend ===
Students racing chariots on the Green at Green Key Weekend.

Green Key Weekend was originally a junior promenade dance prepared by the Green Key Society, a junior service organization that plays various roles in Homecoming, Orientation, and Commencement. However, today, the Society "plays a minor role in the weekend of traditions and debauchery". Unlike Homecoming and Winter Carnival, weekends which "have fairly clear purposes", Green Key has been described as "[having] no point"; The Dartmouth Review describes Green Key as a weekend "devoted to little more than revelry, partying, and hanging out". The three-day weekend is marked by an annual block party at Phi Delta Alpha fraternity and a lawn party at Alpha Delta fraternity.

A number of traditions associated with Green Key Weekend have disappeared over the years. During the 1960s, a trend of "outdoor sleep" was adopted, in which students would sleep on the golf course with their dates, leading to 69 arrests one year. This tradition was ended by police and College officials in 1965. Other traditions ending in the 1960s include the "Wetdown", in which newly elected members of the student government were beaten with belts as they ran through a gauntlet spread across the Green. The increasing violence of this tradition caused it to be replaced with the "infamous" chariot race. According to The Dartmouth:

... the "Ben-Hur" style races between fraternities frequently tore up portions of the Green. Members of the respective fraternities would serve as the chariots' "horses" while onlookers threw eggs and water balloons during the race's three laps around the Green. The event was extremely competitive. Fraternities frequently accused each other of sabotaging competitors' chariots, and in the 1976 race such accusations caused a fight to break out between the members of Zeta Psi and Beta Theta Pi fraternities.

The tradition of the chariot race was ended in 1984.

=== Tubestock and Fieldstock ===
Tubestock on the Connecticut River

Tubestock was an unofficial tradition, never endorsed by the college, that occurred each summer for about two decades prior to 2006, when it was canceled due to new town and state laws. Typical of the other weekends, Tubestock was "a weekend of big drinking"; in this tradition, students built wooden rafts and used rubber inner tubes to float down the Connecticut River. A unique element in Tubestock is that it is usually only sophomores who are present in Hanover for classes over the summer (due to the scheduling plan known as the D-Plan, which requires that sophomore summer be spent in Hanover).

In March 2006, the town of Hanover prepared to enforce its requirement that any event on the Connecticut River present a permit. In the past, Tubestock has technically been illegal, but since no entity officially sanctioned the event, no one could be held responsible; under the proposed legislation, individuals participating could be arrested for illegally congregating on a state waterway. The Dartmouth Editorial Board quickly condemned the action and cited the rapid formation of "Save Tubestock" student committees.

The Dartmouth reported on July 11, 2006, that a final town meeting had permanently put an end to Tubestock for those who did not wish to be arrested. Students organized an alternative event called "Fieldstock" to preserve "a class-unifying event and maybe even start it as a new tradition."

== First-Year Trips ==
Established in 1935 to promote interest in the Dartmouth Outing Club, First-Year Trips is one of the largest pre-orientation programs in the country, involving over 90 percent of students in each incoming class. "Trips" has evolved significantly since its creation, becoming steadily more popular and intricate. During the 1960s, under the support of Dartmouth President John Sloan Dickey, the college renovated the Moosilauke Ravine Lodge, made the Lodge the final destination for all Trips, and brought participation up to two-thirds of the incoming class.

Today, Trips takes place in the two weeks prior to the standard orientation week, and involves a three-night, four-day trip of hiking, kayaking, canoeing, biking, rock climbing, organic farming, nature photography, among other activities, culminating in a tradition-filled night spent at the college-owned Moosilauke Ravine Lodge. Run entirely by current students, these trips feature crews on campus and at the Lodge who welcome the incoming students and teach many of the traditional College dances, songs, and legends. Between six and ten incoming students are led by two current students on their trip. Trips is designed to welcome the incoming students to the college and to introduce them to various campus traditions. Up to one-third of the eligible current students apply to be a trip leader or a support crew.

The First-Year Trips program incorporates many traditions, including a screening of the 1937 ski film Schlitz on Mt. Washington and the singing of the "Alma Mater" and the dancing of the Salty Dog Rag to a song of the same name by Red Foley (mp3). (The Salty Dog Rag, which is a traditional American dance, was brought to Dartmouth by Mary Heller '76, who learned it when she attended The Putney School.

== Commencement ==
Dartmouth's annual Commencement or graduation ceremony is its oldest tradition, dating to 1771. It has been held in some form each year since then, which makes it the oldest continuously held commencement in the U.S. (the six institutions that have held more such ceremonies all were disrupted during the American Revolution). Except for a rare move to a rain location and the period from about 1932 to 1952, when Commencement took place in the Bema, the ceremony has always been held on the Green or in one of the spaces adjacent to it.

Commencement begins with the Class of 1879 Trumpeters playing fanfares from Baker Tower. Then the bells begin to ring. The graduating class walks in a procession up East Wheelock Street to the Green, where for more than 100 years they have formed a gantlet through which the faculty pass on their way to the front of the ceremony. A faculty member brings the Dartmouth Cup, a large piece of eighteenth-century silver given by Lord Dartmouth in 1969. The 50th Reunion Class is honored, and each student crosses the dignitaries' platform at the reading of his or her name to receive a diploma.

== Class Day ==
The day before Commencement, the seniors walk in procession to the Bema, a natural amphitheater in College Park. After a humorous history of the class and other speeches, the class walks up the hill to the stump of the Old Pine, where they hold a farewell ceremony. Students began conducting such ceremonies at the Old Pine in the 1830s, according to alumni of that period. For more than 140 years, the ceremony included the smoking of what were designated "peace pipes"; the offensiveness of the practice of smashing the pipes on the pine, introduced in the 1880s, caused the seniors to omit the smoking element in the early 1990s.

== Dartmouth Pow-Wow ==
The Dartmouth Pow-Wow has been an annual spring celebration since 1973, organized by the student group Native Americans at Dartmouth. The two-day gathering is marked by traditional dancing, crafts, music and art. The Pow-Wow draws 1,500 people to Hanover each year, and is the second largest event of its kind in the Northeast.

== The Green ==
Although many of the traditions involving the Green have faded, some remain. Among these are some of the sacredness of the "Senior Fence" and the annual Christmas Tree placed in the center of the Green.

Part of the first parcel of land owned by Dartmouth College, the Green was originally a dense forest of tall trees. President Eleazar Wheelock ordered that most of these trees be chopped down, which they were over the course of two years, but stumps were not removed. For sixty years following, it was a tradition that the senior class would remove one stump from the Green.

=== Senior Fence ===
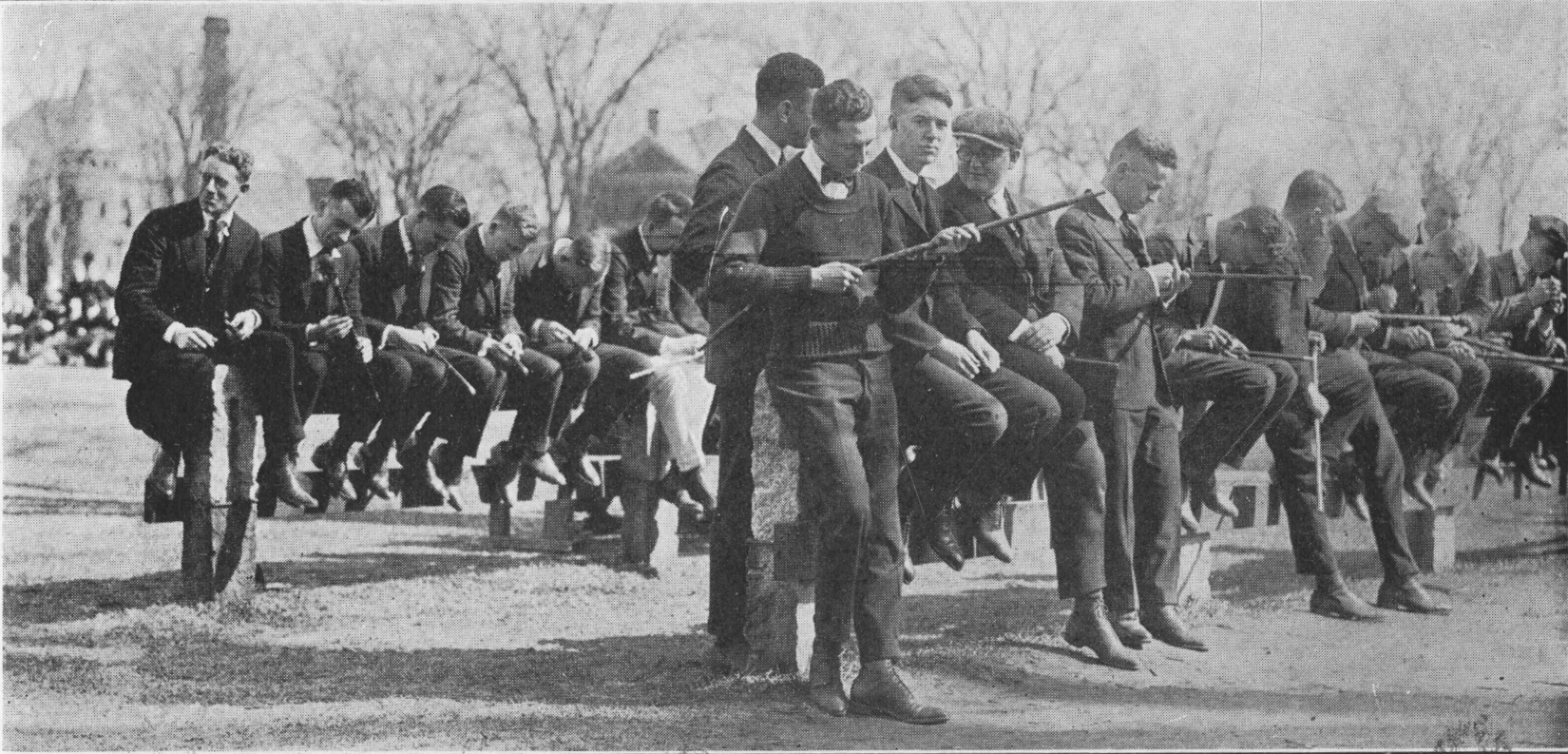
Men carving canes while sitting on the Senior Fence.

During the early 19th century, townspeople grazed cattle on the Green, although it was owned by the college. To protest the townspeople's failure to remove their cattle at night, students regularly would herd the animals into the basement of Dartmouth Hall and hold them hostage. Not until 1836, when the school and some individual citizens funded a fence, did anyone have a sure means of keeping cattle off the Green. The removal of the fence in 1893 prompted students to request that a portion of it be left as a "Senior Fence." Underclassmen were prohibited from sitting on it, with consequences that might include being dumped in a water trough or otherwise humiliated. Over Green Key Weekend, the seniors would pass on their rights to the Fence to the junior class. In 2003 the fence was relocated from two parallel sections of fence on the east side of the Green to its current location at the southwest corner. The administration decided to use the fence in this way in order to prevent students from cutting across the corner of the Green and wearing away the grass. Although the humiliation of undergraduates is no longer enforced, the fence is still held in some regard by the senior class.

== Streaking ==
At Dartmouth, there are a variety of traditions and practices associated with streaking, described by one campus newspaper as "virtual prerequisites for graduating from the College" and "an essential part of the whole experience".

The first known occurrence of streaking occurred in 1924 or 1931 (varying accounts have been published) and was performed by a non-Dartmouth student named Lulu Mcwoosh, who rode a bicycle nude around the campus before church services, causing the annual Green Key Weekend to be canceled. "Midnight Golf", another Green Key tradition, involved nude golf games with visiting females prior to coeducation. During his Commencement address to the Dartmouth class of 2004, Jeffrey R. Immelt '78 admitted to stealing a Christmas tree from the Hanover Inn while streaking in 1974, and in 1993, the varsity cross-country team was reprimanded for streaking across the Green on a Friday afternoon. More recently, Sigma Delta sorority has been credited with starting a streaking club, formalizing a practice in the Greek house that was already "notorious for its streaking activities". Various other formal or informal streaking groups are occasionally formed as friends decide to organize their practice.

=== Legality ===
In the state of New Hampshire, one is guilty of a public indecency misdemeanor if one "exposes his or her genitals ... under circumstances which he or she should know will likely cause affront or alarm", rendering streaking illegal. However, Vermont prohibits only "open and gross lewdness and lascivious behavior", meaning that conventional streaking is entirely legal. This difference in legality complicates streaking events such as the Ledyard Challenge, which has components in both states.

=== Ledyard Challenge ===
The Ledyard Challenge is a streaking event in which students attempt to swim from the Ledyard Canoe Club on the New Hampshire banks of the Connecticut River to the Vermont side, and return by running naked to the same spot via the Ledyard Bridge. According to The Dartmouth, this practice is "an age-old tradition" and "no small number of students has done it".

According to the Valley News, the tradition of the Ledyard Challenge began as follows:

As the legend goes, portrayed in a 1998 Ledyard Canoe Club newsletter, the Ledyard Challenge began under a full moon in the early 1990s, when four students swam naked across the Connecticut River. The students scurried back across the bridge and toward their clubhouse, but campus police caught two of them before they reached the safety of their clothes.

On August 12, 2005, a Bulgarian exchange student from Trinity College at the Tuck School of Business named Valentin Valkov drowned in the Connecticut River, presumably attempting the Ledyard Challenge.

=== Blue Light Challenge ===
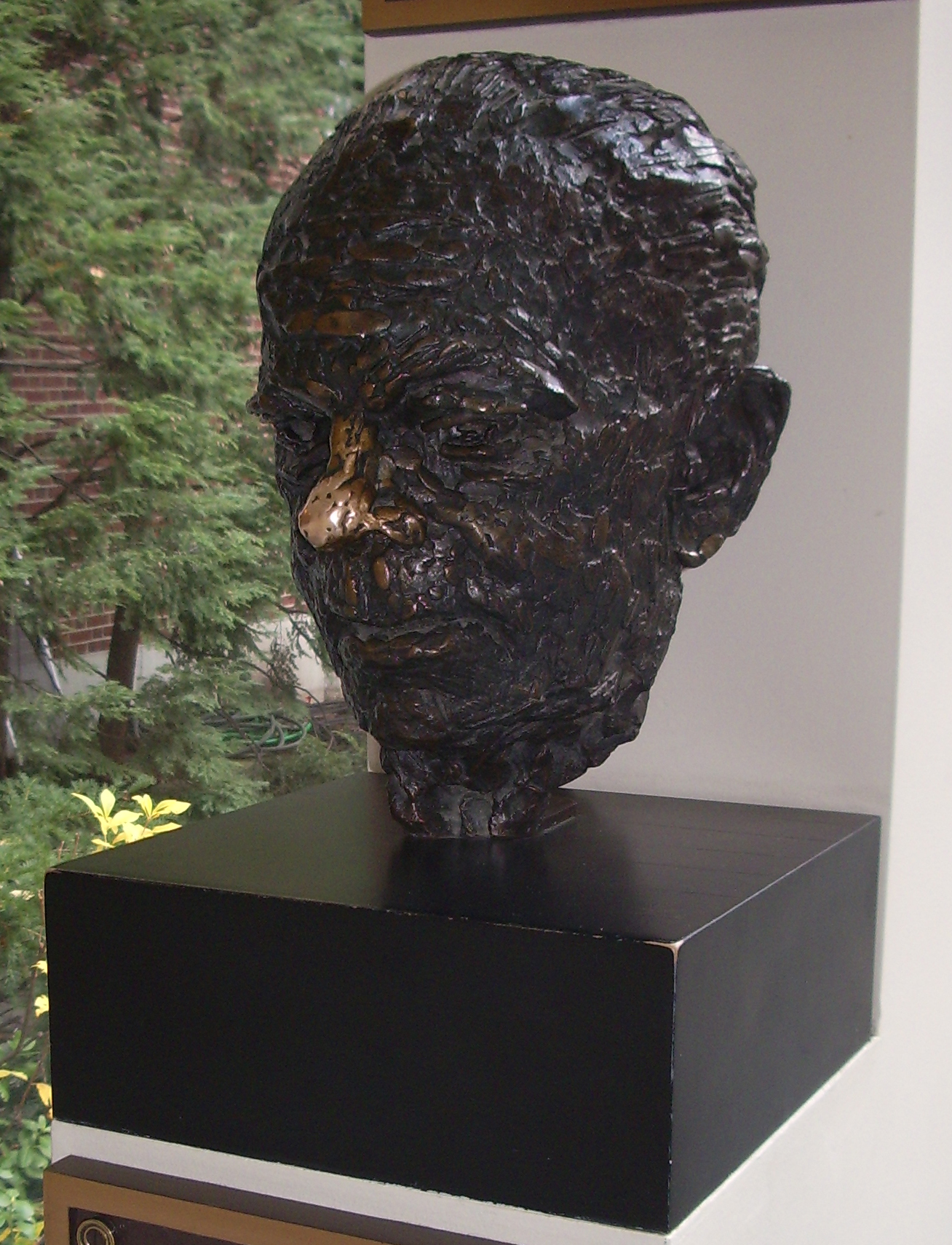
The nose of the statue of Warner Bentley is discolored due to students rubbing it.

The Blue Light Challenge is another streaking tradition in which students strip and run around campus, pressing the emergency button on all of the campus's thirty-one Code Blue phones while attempting to evade campus security.

== Miscellaneous ==
- Students rub the nose of a statue of Warner Bentley in the Hopkins Center for the Arts for good luck. It has been speculated that this tradition grew from an older tradition in which students rubbed the nose of a bust of Craven Laycock, an 1896 graduate and former dean of the college.
- Students throw tennis balls on the rink after the first Dartmouth goal in ice hockey competitions with Princeton University. In an effort to discourage this tradition, Safety & Security officials frisk students entering the game, and the ECAC hockey league assesses a two-minute minor penalty to the home team if balls are thrown.
- Students gather on the Green on the night of the winter's first snowfall for a school-wide snowball fight.
- Tea and cookies are served in Sanborn House Library every weekday between 4 pm and 5 pm, following the habit of Professor Edwin David Sanborn, Class of 1832, to invite his students over his house every afternoon for tea and discussion.
