= Alma Mater (Dartmouth College) =

The "Alma Mater" is the official school song of Dartmouth College, an Ivy League university located in Hanover, New Hampshire, United States. Composed by Harry Wellman, class of 1907, it was officially adopted by the College in 1926. The difficult-to-sing "Dartmouth Undying" replaced it in the fall of 1972, but the Alma Mater was restored as the official song in early 1973. Richard Hovey of the class of 1885 wrote the original lyrics in 1894, titling the song "Men of Dartmouth". Traditionally the original second verse was only sung during time of war. On May 28, 1988, Dartmouth changed the title and words to reflect the presence of women as part of the College, since Dartmouth had become coeducational in 1972. Nicole Sakowitz, Dartmouth Glee Club President was the first person to conduct the new Alma Mater.

The 1988 transition generated significant controversy at the time from students and alumni wishing to maintain the original lyrics, attracting national attention. Although when the College's Board of Trustees adopted the new lyrics it specifically authorized alumni to continue using the original, and the new lyrics were designed to harmonize well with the original, the use of the original version by some fraternities and men's sports teams continued to fuel debate as late as 2007.
