= Lyme, New Hampshire =

Town in New Hampshire, United States

- Town
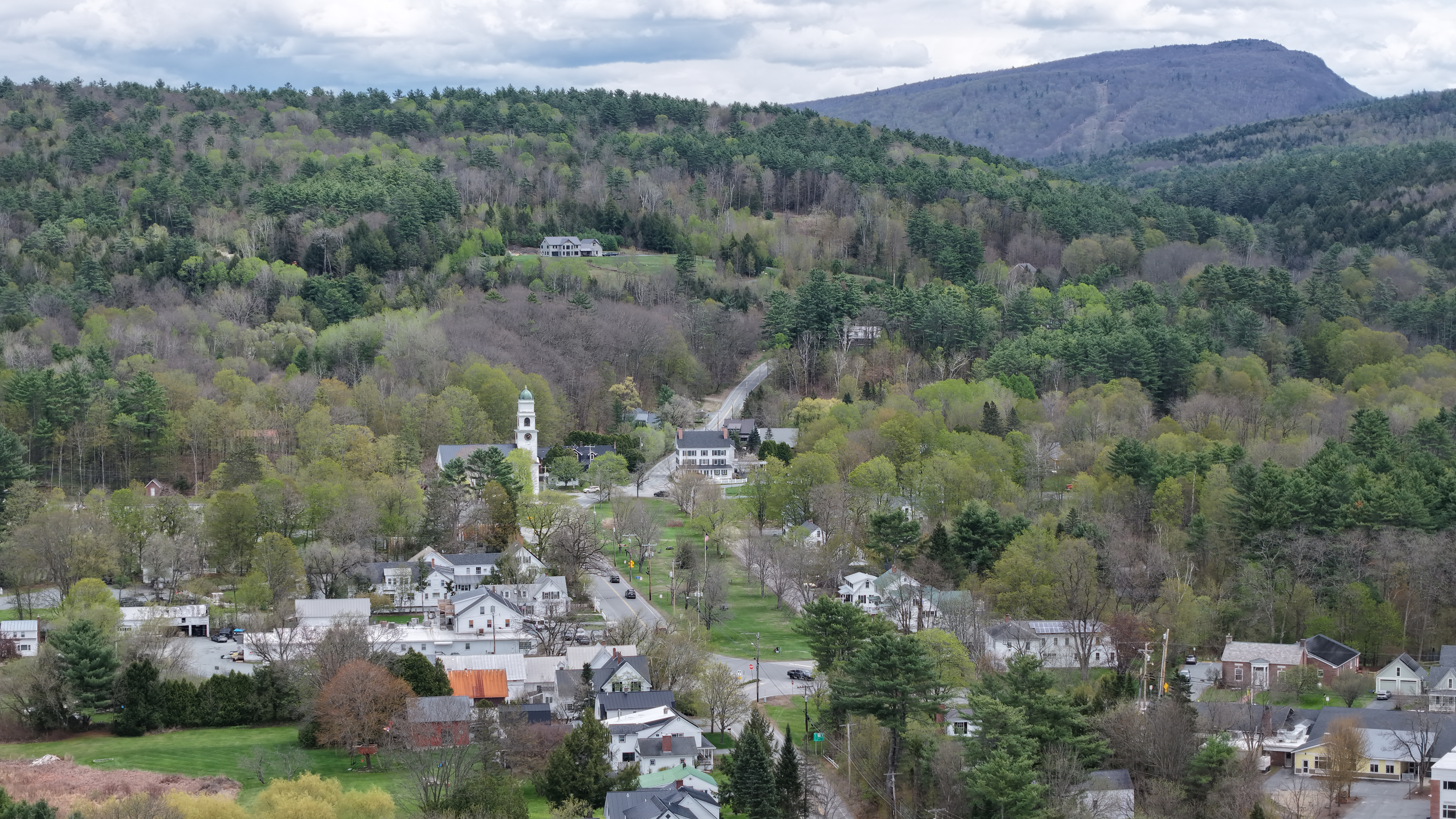
- Lyme, New Hampshire, from the west

- Seal

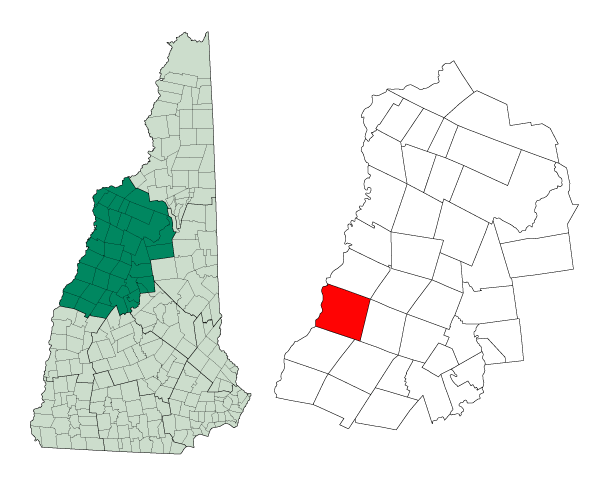
- Location in Grafton County, New Hampshire
- Coordinates: 43°48′19″N 72°06′57″W
- Country: United States
- State: New Hampshire
- County: Grafton
- Incorporated: 1761
- Villages: Lyme; Lyme Center

Area
  - Total: 55.0 sq mi (142.5 km^{2})
  - Land: 53.8 sq mi (139.4 km^{2})
  - Water: 1.2 sq mi (3.1 km^{2}) 2.19%
- Elevation: 1,011 ft (308 m)

Population (2020)
  - Total: 1,745
  - Density: 32/sq mi (12.5/km^{2})
- Time zone: UTC-5 (Eastern)
  - Summer (DST): UTC-4 (Eastern)
- ZIP Codes: 03768 (Lyme); 03769 (Lyme Center)
- Area code: 603
- FIPS code: 33-44260
- GNIS feature ID: 873654
- Website: www.lymenh.gov

Lyme is a town along the Connecticut River in Grafton County, New Hampshire, United States. The population was 1,745 as of the 2020 census. Lyme is home to the Chaffee Natural Conservation Area. The Dartmouth Skiway is in the eastern part of town, near the village of Lyme Center. The Appalachian Trail passes through the town's heavily wooded eastern end.

== History ==
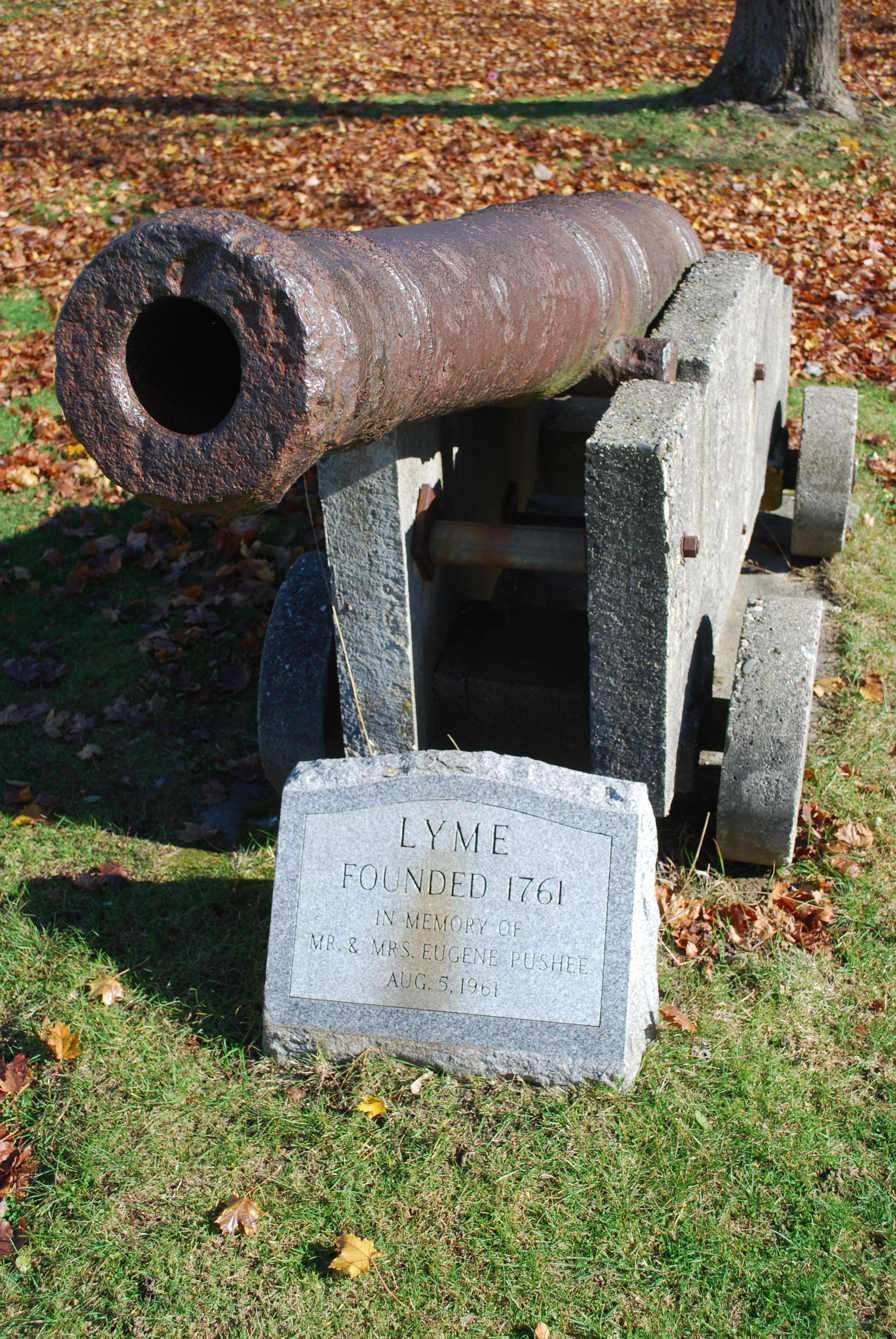
Cannon on the Lyme Common

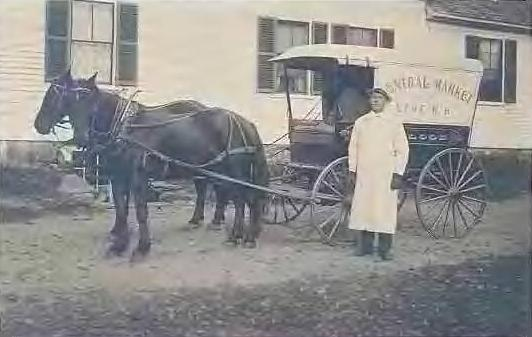
Central Market wagon c. 1910. Photo: Lyme Historians

This was once a home to Abenaki Indians, including a band of Sokokis near Post Pond at a place they called Ordanakis. Later, it would be among the many towns granted by colonial Governor Benning Wentworth along the Connecticut River in 1761. Many of the 63 grantees lived in Massachusetts and Connecticut, but virtually none of them ever settled in Lyme, and they instead sold or assigned their grants to others. However, those settlers who did arrive in 1764 were mostly from those states. The town encompasses land that, prior to the Lyme's founding, was called Tinkham town. In the late 1770s, Lyme petitioned (ultimately unsuccessfully) to join Vermont.

The scenic town common is surrounded with houses and public buildings dating from the late 1700s to the early 1900s. Stagecoaches traveling the old "Boston Turnpike" from Montreal in the 1830s passed through Lyme, stopping at the Lyme Inn, built in 1809 and recently renovated. Next door to the inn is the 200-year-old Congregational church. Its original 1815 steeple bell was cast by Paul Revere. It was later replaced with a bell cast by Henry N. Cooper & Co., Boston. A hand-wound clock mechanism from E. Howard & Co. strikes the hour. Behind the church is a row of horse sheds dating from 1810. The row of 27 sheds standing today is the longest line of contiguous horse sheds in New England, and possibly in the United States. Originally each shed had the name of the owner on a sign above the door. The signs are still there, though not necessarily over the original shed.

== Geography ==
According to the United States Census Bureau, the town has a total area of 55.0 square miles (142.5 km^{2}), of which 53.8 square miles (139.4 km^{2}) are land and 1.2 square miles (3.1 km^{2}) are water, comprising 2.19% of the town. Lyme is drained by Hewes, Grant, and Clay brooks, all flowing to the Connecticut River, which forms the western boundary of the town and the state border with Vermont.

The Lyme Common occupies the center of the village of Lyme, located about 1.5 miles (2.4 km) east of the Connecticut River.

Lyme is a rural town. Most human development is in the western half of the town along the Connecticut River and New Hampshire Route 10, known as the Dartmouth College Highway. The eastern half of the town is mostly forest. The town is home to four great ponds: Post Pond, Pout Pond, Trout Pond, and Reservoir Pond. Holts Ledge is a cliff that faces east and is part of the Dartmouth Skiway. The edge of the cliff is fenced to protect falcons. The highest point in town is the summit of Smarts Mountain, at 3,238 feet (987 m) above sea level. A fire tower, which was built in 1915, is visible from miles away atop Smarts Mountain and sets it apart from other local mountains. The Appalachian Trail crosses the summits of Holts Ledge and Smarts Mountain.

== Demographics ==
Historical population
Census	Pop.	Note	%±
1790	816		—
1800	1,318		61.5%
1810	1,670		26.7%
1820	1,824		9.2%
1830	1,804		−1.1%
1840	1,785		−1.1%
1850	1,617		−9.4%
1860	1,572		−2.8%
1870	1,358		−13.6%
1880	1,313		−3.3%
1890	1,154		−12.1%
1900	1,080		−6.4%
1910	1,007		−6.8%
1920	891		−11.5%
1930	830		−6.8%
1940	965		16.3%
1950	924		−4.2%
1960	1,026		11.0%
1970	1,112		8.4%
1980	1,289		15.9%
1990	1,496		16.1%
2000	1,679		12.2%
2010	1,716		2.2%
2020	1,745		1.7%
U.S. Decennial Census

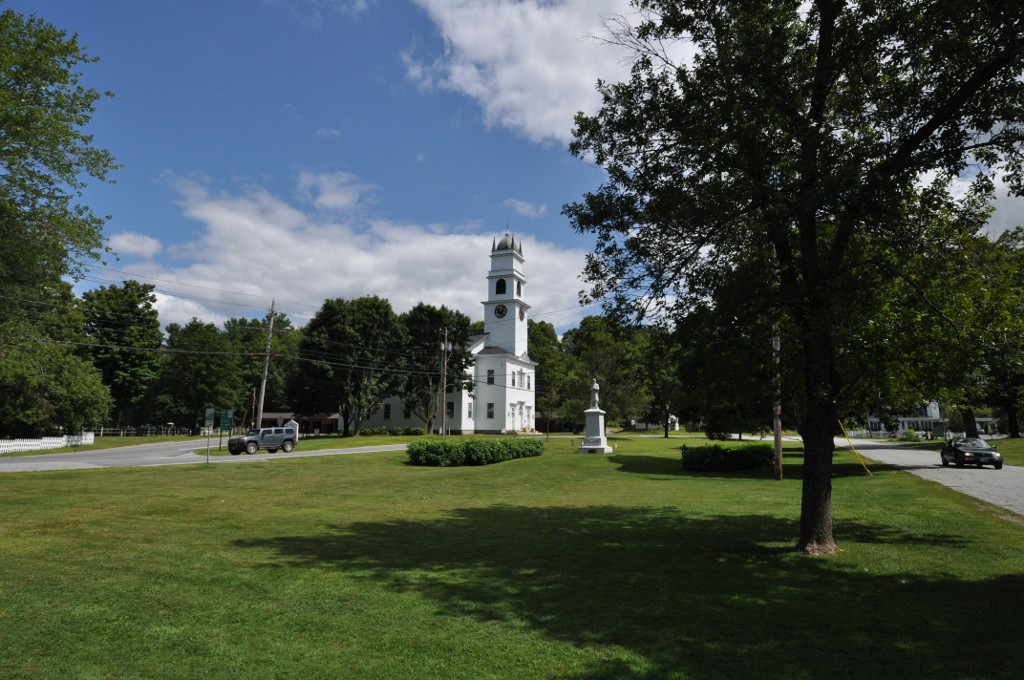
Lyme Town Common

As of the census of 2010, there were 1,716 people, 705 households, and 503 families residing in the town. The population density was 31.4 inhabitants per square mile (12.1/km^{2}). There were 810 housing units at an average density of 14.8 per square mile (5.7/km^{2}). The racial makeup of the town was 96.9% White, 0.3% African American, 0.3% Native American, 1.1% Asian, 0.3% some other race, and 1.0% from two or more races. Hispanic or Latino of any race were 2.4% of the population.

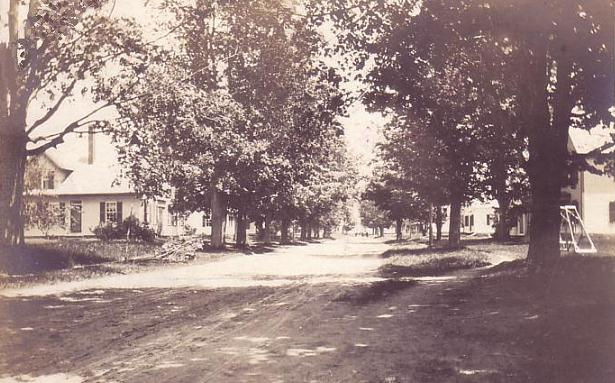
Street scene, c. 1910. Photo: Lyme Historians

Of the 705 households, 28.5% had children under the age of 18 living with them, 61.3% were headed by married couples living together, 6.5% had a female householder with no husband present, and 28.7% were non-families. 23.5% of all households were made up of householders living alone, and 9.0% were someone living alone who was 65 years of age or older. The average household size was 2.42, and the average family size was 2.86.

In the town, the population was spread out, with 22.4% under the age of 18, 4.1% from 18 to 24, 19.5% from 25 to 44, 36.3% from 45 to 64, and 17.8% who were 65 years of age or older. The median age was 47.4 years. For every 100 females, there were 95.4 males. For every 100 females age 18 and over, there were 93.4 males.

Looking at the occupations of employed people in the town over the age of 16, the largest group - 50.9% - is education and health care. The next largest group - 9.6% - is professional, scientific, and management. Construction and manufacturing make up 8.4%; agriculture and forestry make up 0.7%.

For the period 2010 through 2014, the estimated median annual income for a household in the town was $110,781, and the median income for a family was $130,795. Males working full-time, year-round had a median income of $101,875 versus $58,125 for females. The per capita income for the town was $68,381. About 0.6% of families and 3.1% of the population were below the poverty line, including 3.2% of those age 65 or over.

== Education ==
Lyme has two K–8 schools, one public and one independent.

There are currently around 200 students attending the Lyme School, the public K–8 school. As of 2018 the Lyme School has full day kindergarten. The school typically ranks in the top 5–10% of New Hampshire schools. Once a pupil reaches ninth grade, students from Lyme attend one of several high schools: Thetford Academy in Thetford, Vermont (across the Connecticut River), Hanover High School in Hanover, New Hampshire (about 10 miles south of Lyme), Hartford High School in Hartford, Vermont, Lebanon High School in Lebanon, New Hampshire, or St. Johnsbury Academy in St. Johnsbury, Vermont. Attendance is typically split between St. Johnsbury Academy, Thetford Academy and Hanover High, with the few remaining students going elsewhere.

Crossroads Academy, founded in 1991 as a K–8 school in Hanover, is now located on a wooded 140-acre (57 ha) campus at 95 Dartmouth College Highway in Lyme. It serves more than 140 students from a 50-mile radius in grades K–8 and employs 39 faculty and staff.

== Government ==
In the Congress, Lyme is part of the New Hampshire's 2nd congressional district, represented by Democrat Maggie Goodlander. In the State Senate, Lyme is part of the New Hampshire's 5th State Senate district, represented by Democrat Suzanne Prentiss. In the State House, it's part of the Grafton County's 12th District, represented by four Democrats, Mary Hakken-Phillips, Russell Muirhead, Ellen Rockmore and Terry Spahr.

Lyme is one of New Hampshire's most Democratic towns (excepting unincorporated locations, grants and townships), having backed the Democratic candidate with more than 50 points since at least 2008, equivalent to the college towns of Hanover and Durham. In 2012 and 2024, it was New Hampshire's most Democratic town.

Lyme town presidential vote
Year	Democratic	Republican	Third parties
2024	84.47% 1,050	13.92% 173	1.61% 20
2020	82.3% 1,074	16.7% 218	1% 13
2016	74.92% 890	19.53% 232	5.56% 66
2012	77.44% 930	22.56% 271	
2008	76.46% 893	22.86% 267	0.68% 8

== Sites of interest ==
- Lyme Historians Museum
- Appalachian Trail
- Dartmouth Skiway

== Notable people ==
- Fred Hovey Allen (1845–1926), pioneer in American art reproduction
- Jonathan Child (1785–1860), first mayor of Rochester, New York
- David Marston Clough (1846–1924), 13th governor of Minnesota
- Amos P. Cutting (1839–1896), architect
- Trina Schart Hyman (1939–2004), illustrator of children's books
- Arthur Latham Perry (1830–1905), American economist and advocate of free trade
- Baxter E. Perry (1826–1906), second mayor of Medford, Massachusetts
- Albert Cushing Read (1887–1967), commanded first trans-Atlantic seaplane flight (1919)
- Mikaela Shiffrin (born 1995), alpine ski racer, US Olympic gold medalist
